= 2019–20 Talleres de Córdoba season =

Talleres
2019–20 season
- President: Andrés Fassi
- Manager: Alexander Medina
- Stadium: Estadio Mario Alberto Kempes
- Top goalscorer: League: Jony (2); Nahuel Bustos; All: Jony (2); Nahuel Bustos

The 2019–20 season is Talleres' 4th consecutive season in the top division of Argentine football. In addition to the Primera División, the club are competing in the Copa Argentina and Copa de la Superliga.

The season generally covers the period from 1 July 2019 to 30 June 2020.

== Review ==
=== Pre-season ===
Exequiel Beltramone left Talleres on loan on 24 June 2019, signing for Mitre of Primera B Nacional. Two further players were loaned out to that division on 27 June, with Alejandro Maciel and Santiago Moyano both moving to Villa Dálmine. Their first permanent departure came hours later, as Rodrigo Burgos went to Brown. Goalkeeper Kevin Humeler went away from Talleres on 28 June, securing a contract with San Martín. Franco Fragapane completed a move in from Unión Santa Fe on 30 June. Numerous loans from the previous campaign officially expired on and around 30 June. Nicolás Giménez departed to Arsenal de Sarandí on 1 July. Soon after, centre-forwards Catriel Sánchez and Marcos Arturia joined Maciel and Moyano on loan with Villa Dálmine of tier two.

Back-to-back friendlies were set with General Paz Juniors for 3 July, as Talleres came out with respective 2–0 and 3–0 victories at the Estadio La Boutique; with Uruguayan centre-forward Junior Arias scoring in the former, ahead of a potential return to the club. Diego Valoyes, whose loan ended days prior, rejoined for a further season-long deal from La Equidad on 4 July. Talleres' first pre-season match with Instituto on 6 July was prematurely ended, with the referee blowing for full-time early due to aggressive behaviour between the two sets of players; a second encounter was still played, though ended goalless. Río Cuarto-based Estudiantes were defeated in an extended friendly on 10 July, with Leonel Rivas netting its sole goal. Junior Arias resigned on a full-time contract on 16 July.

Two goalless draws with Patronato were played out on 17 July. Nahuel Bustos returned from his loan spell in Mexico with Pachuca on 20 July. He converted a penalty in a friendly with league rivals Central Córdoba a day later, though Talleres would lose on spot-kicks 4–5 at the Estadio Mario Alberto Kempes. Aldo Araujo was loaned by Nueva Chicago on 22 July. Fernando Juárez headed off on loan to Agropecuario on 23 July. Talleres signed a loan deal with Jony of Independiente on 25 July, while Sebastián Palacios' temporary contract from Pachuca was terminated on the same day as he went the other way to Independiente.

=== July ===
On 28 July, Talleres opened their league campaign with three points after Jony netted in a one-nil win over Vélez Sarsfield. Venezuelan left winger Samuel Sosa was loaned out to Spain's Alcorcón on 29 July. Juan Ramírez departed to San Lorenzo on 30 July.

=== August ===
American attacking midfielder Joel Soñora, having trained with them earlier in the day, went on loan to Arsenal de Sarandí on 1 August. In the succeeding hours, Talleres reached an agreement with Banfield for a loan swap transaction involving, the recently signed, Junior Arias and Martín Payero. Talleres' opening loss of 2019–20 came on 3 August, as Rosario Central beat them 1–0 at the Estadio Gigante de Arroyito. Talleres were beaten in back-to-back exhibitions by Vélez Sarsfield on 10 August. Talleres and Central Córdoba experienced a 1–1 draw in the Primera División on 16 August. Talleres played out a scoreless home friendly with General Paz Juniors on 21 August, as they met the Torneo Regional Federal Amateur outfit for the third time in non-competitive action.

For the first time since 1990, Talleres won away to River Plate on 25 August thanks to a goal from Nahuel Bustos.

=== September ===
Bustos scored again on matchday five, as Talleres defeated Aldosivi 2–1 at home.

== Squad ==
Squad No.	Nationality	Name	Position(s)	Date of Birth (age)	Signed from
Goalkeepers
1	Argentina	Mauricio Caranta	GK	31 July 1978 (age 48)	Rosario Central
22	Argentina	Guido Herrera	GK	29 February 1992 (age 34)	Defensores de Belgrano
37	Argentina	Franco Fragueda	GK	25 July 2000 (age 26)	Academy
12	Argentina	Federico Abadía	GK	12 June 1998 (age 28)	Boca Juniors (loan)
43	Argentina	Ezequiel Mastrolía	GK	25 March 1991 (age 35)	Platense
Defenders
3	Argentina	Javier Gandolfi	RB	5 December 1980 (age 45)	Tijuana
6	Argentina	Juan Cruz Komar	CB	13 August 1996 (age 30)	Boca Juniors
13	Argentina	Facundo Medina	LB	28 May 1999 (age 27)	River Plate
14	Argentina	Nahuel Tenaglia	RB	21 February 1996 (age 30)	Atlanta
15	Argentina	Enzo Díaz	CB	7 December 1995 (age 30)	Agropecuario (loan)
25	Argentina	Leonardo Godoy	RB	28 April 1995 (age 31)	Atlético de Rafaela
26	Argentina	Fernando Bersano	LB	3 January 1998 (age 28)	Academy
36	Argentina	Franco Malagueño	RB	10 October 1998 (age 28)	Academy
39	Argentina	Renzo Paparelli	CB	24 March 1997 (age 29)	Academy
Midfielders
5	Argentina	Federico Navarro	CM	9 March 2000 (age 26)	Academy
8	Argentina	Andrés Cubas	CM	22 May 1996 (age 30)	Boca Juniors
18	Argentina	Ignacio Méndez	AM	28 April 1997 (age 29)	Argentinos Juniors
21	Argentina	Martín Payero	CM	11 September 1998 (age 28)	Banfield (loan)
27	Argentina	Leonel Rivas	AM	4 December 1999 (age 26)	Rosario Central (loan)
32	Argentina	Tomás Pochettino	AM	1 February 1996 (age 30)	Boca Juniors
38	Argentina	Carlos Villalba	CM	19 July 1998 (age 28)	Academy
Forwards
7	Colombia	Diego Valoyes	CF	22 September 1996 (age 30)	La Equidad (loan)
17	Colombia	Dayro Moreno	CF	16 September 1985 (age 41)	Atlético Nacional
19	Argentina	Mauro Ortiz	RW	27 September 1994 (age 32)	Deportivo Riestra
20	Argentina	Franco Fragapane	CF	6 February 1993 (age 33)	Unión Santa Fe
23	Argentina	Lautaro Guzmán	FW	18 January 2000 (age 26)	Academy
10	Argentina	Nahuel Bustos	RW	4 July 1998 (age 28)	Argentino Peñarol
34	Argentina	Jony	LW	5 March 1994 (age 32)	Independiente (loan)
35	Argentina	Mauro Valiente	CF	28 January 2001 (age 25)	Academy
Out on loan					Loaned to
9	Uruguay	Junior Arias	CF	6 February 1993 (age 33)	Banfield
11	Venezuela	Samuel Sosa	LW	17 December 1999 (age 26)	Alcorcón
30	Argentina	Fernando Juárez	CM	23 August 1998 (age 28)	Agropecuario
24	Argentina	Marcos Arturia	CF	8 February 1998 (age 28)	Villa Dálmine
16	Argentina	Aldo Araujo	AM	3 January 1992 (age 34)	Nueva Chicago
33	Argentina	Joaquín Blázquez	GK	28 January 2001 (age 25)	Valencia
42	Argentina	Exequiel Beltramone	RW	9 February 1999 (age 27)	Mitre
4	Argentina	Ian Escobar	LB	29 May 1996 (age 30)	San Martín
2	Argentina	Alejandro Maciel	DF	22 April 1997 (age 29)	Villa Dálmine
41	Argentina	Santiago Moyano	RB	23 September 1997 (age 29)	Villa Dálmine
40	Argentina	Tomás Oneto	DF	19 February 1998 (age 28)	Alavés B
29	Argentina	Catriel Sánchez	CF	17 July 1998 (age 28)	Villa Dálmine
31	United States	Joel Soñora	AM	15 September 1996 (age 30)	Arsenal de Sarandí

== Transfers ==
Domestic transfer windows:
3 July 2019 to 24 September 2019
20 January 2020 to 19 February 2020.

=== Transfers in ===
Date from	Position	Nationality	Name	From	Ref.
3 July 2019 (Note: Deal agreed on 30 June 2019)	CF	Argentina	Franco Fragapane	Unión Santa Fe	
16 July 2019	CF	Uruguay	Junior Arias	Peñarol	

=== Transfers out ===
Date from	Position	Nationality	Name	To	Ref.
3 July 2019 (Note: Deal agreed on 27 June 2019)	MF	Paraguay	Rodrigo Burgos	Brown	
3 July 2019 (Note: Deal agreed on 28 June 2019)	GK	Argentina	Kevin Humeler	San Martín	
3 July 2019 (Note: Deal agreed on 1 July 2019)	AM	Argentina	Nicolás Giménez	Arsenal de Sarandí	
30 July 2019	LM	Argentina	Juan Ramírez	San Lorenzo	

=== Loans in ===
Start date	Position	Nationality	Name	From	End date	Ref.
4 July 2019	CF	Colombia	Diego Valoyes	La Equidad	30 June 2020	
25 July 2019	LW	Argentina	Jony	Independiente	30 June 2020	
1 August 2019	CM	Argentina	Martín Payero	Banfield	30 June 2020	

=== Loans out ===
Start date	Position	Nationality	Name	To	End date	Ref.
3 July 2019 (Note: Deal agreed on 24 June 2019)	RW	Argentina	Exequiel Beltramone	Mitre	30 June 2020	
3 July 2019 (Note: Deal agreed on 27 June 2019)	DF	Argentina	Alejandro Maciel	Villa Dálmine	30 June 2020	
3 July 2019 (Note: Deal agreed on 27 June 2019)	RB	Argentina	Santiago Moyano	Villa Dálmine	30 June 2020	
3 July 2019 (Note: Deal agreed on 1 July 2019)	CF	Argentina	Catriel Sánchez	Villa Dálmine	30 June 2020	
3 July 2019 (Note: Deal agreed on 1 July 2019)	CF	Argentina	Marcos Arturia	Villa Dálmine	30 June 2020	
22 July 2019	AM	Argentina	Aldo Araujo	Nueva Chicago	30 June 2020	
23 July 2019	CM	Argentina	Fernando Juárez	Agropecuario	30 June 2020	
29 July 2019	LW	Venezuela	Samuel Sosa	Alcorcón	30 June 2020	
1 August 2019	AM	United States	Joel Soñora	Arsenal de Sarandí	30 June 2020	
1 August 2019	CF	Uruguay	Junior Arias	Banfield	30 June 2020	

== Friendlies ==
=== Pre-season ===
Arsenal de Sarandí revealed a pre-season friendly with Talleres on 2 July. Further matches with General Paz Juniors and Instituto were also scheduled. They'd also meet newly-promoted Primera División team Central Córdoba. Friendlies with Estudiantes (RC) and Rosario Central were confirmed on 9 July. Games with Patronato was set for 17 July, the same day as the Rosario encounter; though that was later cancelled. The match with Arsenal was also scrapped on 12 July due to bad weather.

Win Draw Loss

3 July 2019 Friendly	Talleres	2–0	General Paz Juniors	Córdoba, Argentina
	T. Pochettino; J. Arias	Talleres; La Voz del Interior; 50 min. match		Stadium: Estadio La Boutique

3 July 2019 Friendly	Talleres	3–0	General Paz Juniors	Córdoba, Argentina
	M. Valiente; D. Moreno	Talleres; La Voz del Interior; 50 min. match		Stadium: Estadio La Boutique

6 July 2019 Friendly	Talleres	1–0	Instituto	Córdoba, Argentina
10:00 GMT-3	T. Pochettino	Talleres; Vía País; Abandoned at 1–0		Stadium: Estadio Mario Alberto Kempes

6 July 2019 Friendly	Talleres	0–0	Instituto	Córdoba, Argentina
		Talleres; Vía País		Stadium: Estadio Mario Alberto Kempes

10 July 2019 Friendly	Talleres	1–0	Estudiantes (RC)	Córdoba, Argentina
	L. Rivas	Talleres; La Voz del Interior; 120 min. match		Stadium: Estadio Mario Alberto Kempes; Attendance: 0 (Note: Behind closed doors.); Referee: Lucas Hernández (Argentina)

13 July 2019 Friendly	Arsenal de Sarandí	Cancelled	Talleres	Buenos Aires, Argentina
		La Voz del Interior

17 July 2019 Friendly	Rosario Central	Cancelled	Talleres	Argentina
		La Voz del Interior

17 July 2019 Friendly	Patronato	0–0	Talleres	Paraná, Argentina
10:00 GMT-3		Talleres; Vía País		Stadium: Estadio Presbítero Bartolomé Grella

17 July 2019 Friendly	Patronato	0–0	Talleres	Paraná, Argentina
		Talleres; Vía País; 60 min. match		Stadium: Estadio Presbítero Bartolomé Grella

21 July 2019 Friendly	Talleres	1–1 (4–5 p)	Central Córdoba	Córdoba, Argentina
	J. Gandolfi 3'	Talleres; Vía País	F. Cristaldo 48'	Stadium: Estadio Mario Alberto Kempes; Referee: Nicolás Lamolina (Argentina)
	Penalties
	J. Arias (penalty scored); N. Bustos (penalty scored); I. Méndez (penalty scored); F. Fragapane (penalty scored); D. Valoyes (penalty missed)		F. Rodríguez (penalty scored); H. Vera Oviedo (penalty scored); M. Nani (penalty scored); F. Cristaldo (penalty scored); J. Herrera (penalty scored)

=== Mid-season ===
A friendly match with Vélez Sarsfield was scheduled on 10 August, twelve days prior to a third friendly meeting with General Paz Juniors.

Win Draw Loss

10 August 2019 Friendly	Vélez Sarsfield	1–0	Talleres	Ituzaingó, Argentina
10:00 GMT-3	L. Janson	Talleres; Marca; 70 min. match		Stadium: Villa Olímpica

10 August 2019 Friendly	Vélez Sarsfield	2–0	Talleres	Ituzaingó, Argentina
	N. Domínguez	Talleres; Marca; 70 min. match		Stadium: Villa Olímpica

21 August 2019 Friendly	Talleres	0–0	General Paz Juniors	Córdoba, Argentina
		Talleres; La Voz del Interior		Stadium: Estadio La Boutique; Referee: Fernando Reckers (Argentina)

== Competitions ==
=== Primera División ===
==== League table ====
Pos	Team	Pld	W	D	L	GF	GA	GD	Pts
10	Newell's Old Boys	23	9	8	6	33	25	+8	35
11	Arsenal	23	9	7	7	37	32	+5	34
12	Talleres (C)	23	10	4	9	34	30	+4	34
13	Estudiantes (LP)	23	8	6	9	23	22	+1	30
14	Independiente	23	8	5	10	27	25	+2	29

Source: AFA
Rules for classification: 1) points; 2) play-off (only if needed to decide championship); 3) goal difference; 4) goals scored; 5) head-to-head points; 6) head-to-head goal difference; 7) head-to-head goals scored.

==== Relegation table ====
Pos	Team	2017–18 Pts	2018–19 Pts	2019–20 Pts	Total Pts	Total Pld	Avg	Relegation
6	Independiente	46	38	6	90	56	1.607	
7	Godoy Cruz	56	32	3	91	57	1.596	
8	Talleres (C)	46	33	10	89	57	1.561	
9	Huracán	48	35	5	88	57	1.544	
10	San Lorenzo	50	23	13	86	57	1.509	

Source: AFA

==== Results summary ====
Overall								Home						Away					
Pld	W	D	L	GF	GA	GD	Pts	W	D	L	GF	GA	GD	W	D	L	GF	GA	GD
5	3	1	1	5	3	+2	10	2	1	0	4	2	+2	1	0	1	1	1	0

Last updated: 2 September 2019.
Source: Soccerway

==== Matches ====
The fixtures for the 2019–20 campaign were released on 10 July.

Win Draw Loss

28 July 2019 1	Talleres	1–0	Vélez Sarsfield	Córdoba, Argentina
15:30 GMT-3	Jony 71'	Talleres; Infobae; Soccerway		Stadium: Estadio Mario Alberto Kempes; Referee: Ariel Penel (Argentina)

3 August 2019 2	Rosario Central	1–0	Talleres	Rosario, Argentina
15:30 GMT-3	D. Zabala 77'	Talleres; Infobae; Soccerway		Stadium: Estadio Gigante de Arroyito; Referee: Facundo Tello (Argentina)

16 August 2019 3	Talleres	1–1	Central Córdoba	Córdoba, Argentina
21:10 GMT-3	I. Méndez 31'	Talleres; Infobae; Soccerway	L. Alzugaray 64'	Stadium: Estadio Mario Alberto Kempes; Referee: Nicolás Lamolina (Argentina)

25 August 2019 4	River Plate	0–1	Talleres	Buenos Aires, Argentina
17:45 GMT-3		Talleres; Infobae; Soccerway	N. Bustos 63'	Stadium: Estadio Monumental Antonio Vespucio Liberti; Referee: Néstor Pitana (Argentina)

1 September 2019 5	Talleres	2–1	Aldosivi	Córdoba, Argentina
13:15 GMT-3	N. Bustos 17'; Jony 37'	Talleres; Infobae; Soccerway	N. Solís 1'	Stadium: Estadio Mario Alberto Kempes; Referee: Andrés Merlos (Argentina)

6	Banfield	–	Talleres	Banfield, Argentina
				Stadium: Estadio Florencio Sola

=== Copa Argentina ===
Win Draw Loss

Talleres' opposition for the round of thirty-two in the Copa Argentina was revealed to be fellow Primera División team Banfield, set for 10 September; having previously been tentatively scheduled to take place in August.

10 September 2019 R32	Talleres	–	Banfield	Argentina

=== Copa de la Superliga ===
Win Draw Loss

	–
00:00 GMT-3

== Squad statistics ==
=== Appearances and goals ===
No.	Pos.	Nationality	Name	League		Cup		League Cup		Continental		Total		Discipline		Ref
No.	Pos.	Nationality	Name	Apps	Goals	Apps	Goals	Apps	Goals	Apps	Goals	Apps	Goals	Yellow card	Red card	Ref
1	GK	Argentina	Mauricio Caranta	0	0	0	0	0	0	—		0	0	0	0	
3	RB	Argentina	Javier Gandolfi	3	0	0	0	0	0	—		3	0	0	0	
5	CM	Argentina	Federico Navarro	0(3)	0	0	0	0	0	—		0(3)	0	0	0	
6	CB	Argentina	Juan Cruz Komar	5	0	0	0	0	0	—		5	0	3	0	
7	CF	Colombia	Diego Valoyes	0(2)	0	0	0	0	0	—		0(2)	0	0	0	
8	CM	Argentina	Andrés Cubas	5	0	0	0	0	0	—		5	0	2	0	
9	CF	Uruguay	Junior Arias	0(1)	0	0	0	0	0	—		0(1)	0	0	0	
11	LW	Venezuela	Samuel Sosa	0	0	0	0	0	0	—		0	0	0	0	
13	LB	Argentina	Facundo Medina	3	0	0	0	0	0	—		3	0	3	0	
14	RB	Argentina	Nahuel Tenaglia	5	0	0	0	0	0	—		5	0	1	0	
15	CB	Argentina	Enzo Díaz	4	0	0	0	0	0	—		4	0	1	0	
16	CM	Argentina	Fernando Juárez	0	0	0	0	0	0	—		0	0	0	0	
17	CF	Colombia	Dayro Moreno	2(2)	0	0	0	0	0	—		2(2)	0	0	0	
18	AM	Argentina	Ignacio Méndez	5	1	0	0	0	0	—		5	1	0	0	
19	RW	Argentina	Mauro Ortiz	0	0	0	0	0	0	—		0	0	0	0	
20	CF	Argentina	Franco Fragapane	5	0	0	0	0	0	—		5	0	0	0	
21	CM	Argentina	Martín Payero	0(2)	0	0	0	0	0	—		0(2)	0	1	0	
22	GK	Argentina	Guido Herrera	5	0	0	0	0	0	—		5	0	0	0	
23	FW	Argentina	Lautaro Guzmán	0(1)	0	0	0	0	0	—		0(1)	0	0	0	
24	CF	Argentina	Marcos Arturia	0	0	0	0	0	0	—		0	0	0	0	
25	RB	Argentina	Leonardo Godoy	0	0	0	0	0	0	—		0	0	0	0	
26	LB	Argentina	Fernando Bersano	0	0	0	0	0	0	—		0	0	0	0	
27	AM	Argentina	Leonel Rivas	0	0	0	0	0	0	—		0	0	0	0	
32	AM	Argentina	Tomás Pochettino	5	0	0	0	0	0	—		5	0	0	0	
33	RW	Argentina	Nahuel Bustos	3(2)	2	0	0	0	0	—		3(2)	2	1	0	
34	LW	Argentina	Jony	5	2	0	0	0	0	—		5	2	0	0	
35	CF	Argentina	Mauro Valiente	0(1)	0	0	0	0	0	—		0(1)	0	0	0	
36	RB	Argentina	Franco Malagueño	0	0	0	0	0	0	—		0	0	0	0	
37	GK	Argentina	Franco Fragueda	0	0	0	0	0	0	—		0	0	0	0	
38	CM	Argentina	Carlos Villalba	0	0	0	0	0	0	—		0	0	0	0	
39	CB	Argentina	Renzo Paparelli	0(1)	0	0	0	0	0	—		0(1)	0	0	0	
–	GK	Argentina	Federico Abadía	0	0	0	0	0	0	—		0	0	0	0	
–	AM	Argentina	Aldo Araujo	0	0	0	0	0	0	—		0	0	0	0	
–	RW	Argentina	Exequiel Beltramone	0	0	0	0	0	0	—		0	0	0	0	
–	GK	Argentina	Joaquín Blázquez	0	0	0	0	0	0	—		0	0	0	0	
–	LB	Argentina	Ian Escobar	0	0	0	0	0	0	—		0	0	0	0	
–	DF	Argentina	Alejandro Maciel	0	0	0	0	0	0	—		0	0	0	0	
–	GK	Argentina	Ezequiel Mastrolía	0	0	0	0	0	0	—		0	0	0	0	
–	RB	Argentina	Santiago Moyano	0	0	0	0	0	0	—		0	0	0	0	
–	DF	Argentina	Tomás Oneto	0	0	0	0	0	0	—		0	0	0	0	
–	CF	Argentina	Catriel Sánchez	0	0	0	0	0	0	—		0	0	0	0	
–	AM	United States	Joel Soñora	0	0	0	0	0	0	—		0	0	0	0	
Own goals				—	0	—	0	—	0	—		—	0	—	—	—

Statistics accurate as of 2 September 2019.

=== Goalscorers ===
Rank	Pos	No.	Nat	Name	League	Cup	League Cup	Continental	Total	Ref
1	LW	27	Argentina	Jony	2	0	0	–	2	
1	RW	33	Argentina	Nahuel Bustos	2	0	0	–	2	
2	AM	18	Argentina	Ignacio Méndez	1	0	0	–	1	
Own goals					0	0	0	–	0	
Totals					5	0	0	–	5	—
