= 2020 Copa Argentina final =

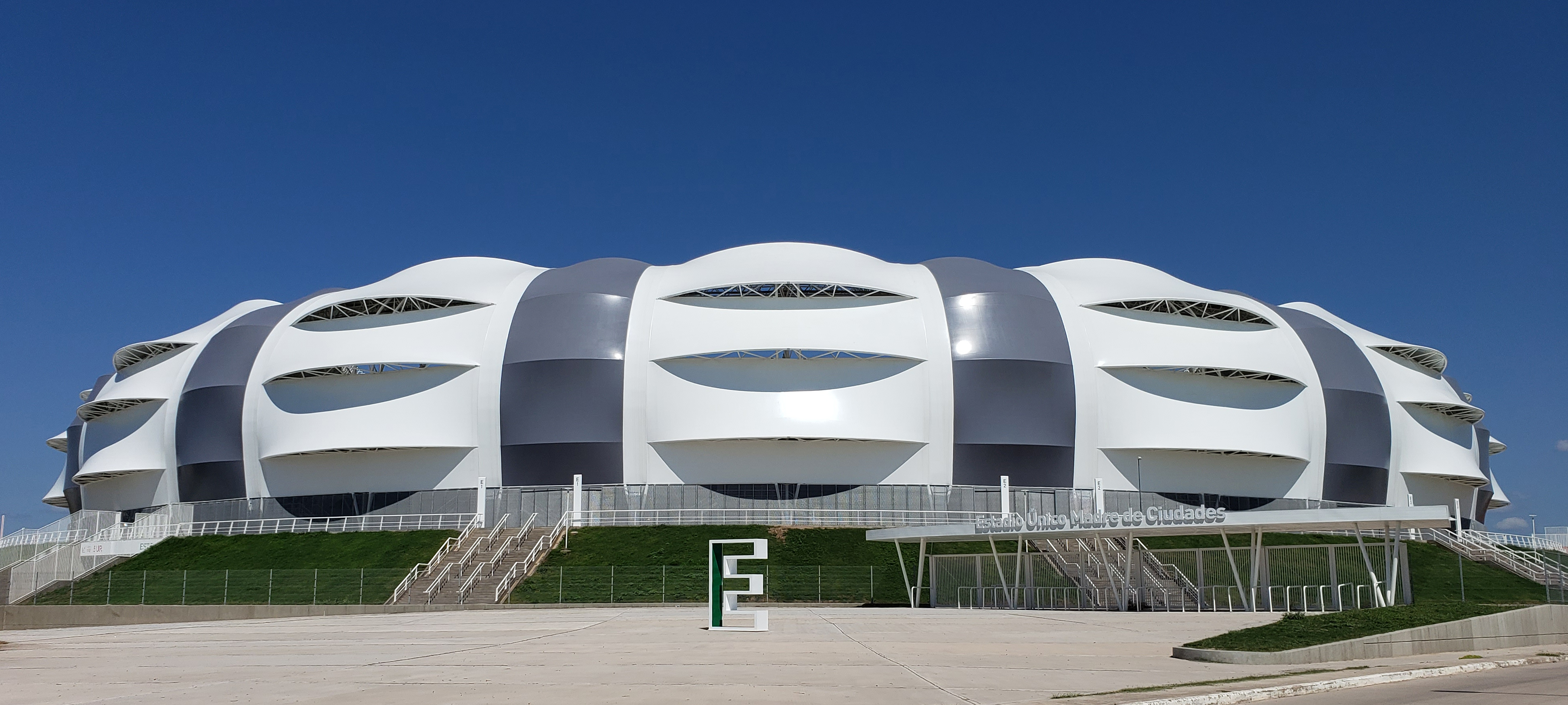
- Estadio Único Madre de Ciudades, the venue
- Event: 2019–20 Copa Argentina
Talleres (C)	Boca Juniors
0	0
- Boca Juniors won 5–4 on penalties
- Date: December 8, 2021
- Venue: Madre de Ciudades, Santiago del Estero
- Man of the Match: Agustín Rossi (Boca Juniors)
- Referee: Darío Herrera

The 2020 Copa Argentina final was the 89th and final match of the 2019–20 Copa Argentina. It was played on December 8, 2021 at Estadio Único Madre de Ciudades in Santiago del Estero between Boca Juniors and Talleres (C).

Originally scheduled to be held in 2020, the final (and the entire tournament itself) was delayed after on 17 March 2020, the Argentine Football Association (AFA) announced the suspension of the competition to prevent the spread of the coronavirus COVID-19. After several months the tournament resumed on 23 December 2020.

Boca Juniors defeated Talleres (C) in the final on penalties to win their fourth tournament title. As champions, they qualified for the 2022 Copa Libertadores group stage and the 2021 Supercopa Argentina.

== Qualified teams ==
Team	Previous finals app.
Talleres (C)	None
Boca Juniors	3 (**1969**, **2012**, **2015**)

Bold indicates winning years

== Road to the final ==
Talleres (C)			Round	Boca Juniors		
Opponent	Venue	Score		Opponent	Venue	Score
Atlético de Rafaela	Estadio Único (San Nicolás)	0–0 (6–5 p)	Round of 64	Claypole	Estadio Ciudad de Lanús	2–1
Vélez Sarsfield	Estadio Florencio Sola	1–1 (3–1 p)	Round of 32	Defensores de Belgrano	Estadio Único (LP)	3–0
Estudiantes (RC)	Estadio Marcelo Bielsa	1–1 (6–5 p)	Round of 16	River Plate	Estadio Único (LP)	0–0 (4–1 p)
Temperley	Estadio Ciudad de Lanús	2–1	Quarterfinals	Patronato	Madre de Ciudades	0–0 (4–2 p)
Godoy Cruz	Juan G. Funes (San Luis)	1–0	Semifinals	Argentinos Juniors	Malvinas Argentinas	1–0

== Match ==
=== Summary ===
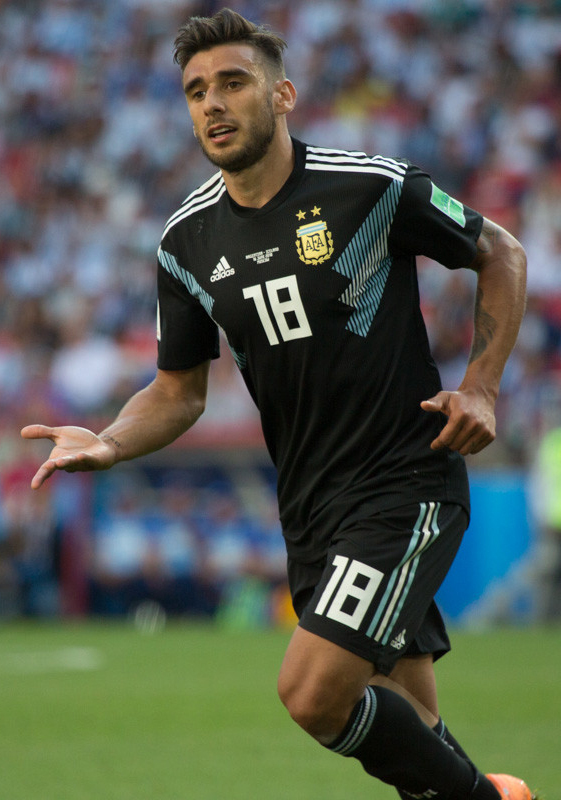
Eduardo Salvio converted the last penalty kick to secure the Boca Juniors win, 5–4

The first minutes of the match had the tension and effervescence of a final. With many frictions and infractions and willingness to search on both sides; also with a good amount of inaccuracies. Talleres opted to press high, although sometimes it gave way in the desire to cut quickly and in the opponent's field. On the other side, Boca Juniors brought a 4–3–3 formation with Edwin Cardona positioned as a left wing.

The first concrete chance to break the score was for Talleres, in the 7th minute when after a corner kick, the ball led to Rafa Pérez, who dribbled Luis Advíncula inside the penalty area but his shot was saved by Carlos Izquierdoz.

The match continued to be physical and extremely even, but the team managed by Sebastián Battaglia adapted to the siege and began to get some connections, from specific appearances by Juan Ramírez or Cardona, at least generating a couple of good ocassions to score. At 38 minutes, a rushed shot by Cardona was the clearest chance to score.

The most unbalanced of both squads had few spaces or fair play to take advantage of their qualities. Diego Valoyes only found a chance to score in the 41st minute but Boca Juniors goalkeeper Agustín Rossi could roughly make a save that avoided the score opening.

In the second half the duel continued to be just as intense and short. A long pass from the right that Luis Vázquez headed in and a run from Frank Fabra on the left forced separate interventions by Talleres captain Juan Cruz Komar to save the goal. Those were specific actions in a flat match, in which both prioritized the fight over the skills.

The match offered a break at 21', with Juan Ramírez being sent off after receiving a double yellow card. It served as an alarm clock for Talleres, which moved forward into the field and assumed a more aggressive stance in the search. At 25', midfielder Ángelo Martino sent a long pass which was hit by Héctor Fértoli who was completely alone, but with no success in what was the clearest chance to score a goal of the entire match.

Talleres continued pushing with long passes against a Boca Juniors team that defended well and counterattacked using Sebastián Villa's speed. But the fear of error evidenced by both teams overcame the good intentions. Boca Juniors had the last chance to score in regular time in the 93rd minute when Marcos Rojo headed the ball with no success.

In the penalty shoot-out Agustín Rossi stopped the shot by Héctor Fertoli and became the key for a new Boca Juniors title.

=== Details ===
2019–20 Copa Argentina Final
December 8, 2021
21:10

Talleres (C)	0–0	Boca Juniors
	Report
Penalties
Retegui (penalty scored); Fértoli (penalty missed); Méndez (penalty scored); Díaz (penalty scored); Santos (penalty scored)	4–5	(penalty scored) Rojo; (penalty scored) Izquierdoz; (penalty scored) Pavón; (penalty scored) Sández; (penalty scored) Salvio

Estadio Único Madre de Ciudades, Santiago del Estero
Referee: Darío Herrera

**Talleres (C)**	**Boca Juniors**

GK	22	(Argentina) Guido Herrera
DF	14	(Argentina) Nahuel Tenaglia	(yellow card) 52'	(substituted off) 90+1'
DF	6	(Argentina) Juan Cruz Komar (c)
DF	2	(Colombia) Rafa Pérez
DF	15	(Argentina) Enzo Díaz
MF	18	(Argentina) Rodrigo Villagra	(yellow card) 3'	(substituted off) 90+1'
MF	8	(Argentina) Ignacio Méndez
MF	7	(Colombia) Diego Valoyes	(yellow card) 31'
MF	28	(Argentina) Carlos Auzqui	(yellow card) 45+1'	(substituted off) 61'
MF	21	(Argentina) Ángelo Martino		(substituted off) 71'
FW	9	(Uruguay) Michael Santos
Substitutes:
GK	33	(Argentina) Joaquín Blázquez
DF	3	(Argentina) Julián Velázquez
DF	13	(Argentina) Julián Malatini
DF	25	(Argentina) Federico Torres
MF	10	(Argentina) Héctor Fértoli		(substituted on) 61'
MF	16	(Argentina) Francis Mac Allister		(substituted on) 90+1'
MF	40	(Argentina) Cristian Ludueña
MF	50	(Uruguay) Diego García
FW	19	(Argentina) Mauro Ortiz
FW	23	(Argentina) Mateo Retegui		(substituted on) 90+1'
FW	30	(Argentina) Juan Cruz Esquivel		(substituted on) 71'
FW	34	(Argentina) David Romero
Manager:
(Uruguay) Alexander Medina

GK	1	(Argentina) Agustín Rossi
DF	17	(Peru) Luis Advíncula
DF	24	(Argentina) Carlos Izquierdoz (c)
DF	6	(Argentina) Marcos Rojo
DF	18	(Colombia) Frank Fabra	(yellow card) 35'	(substituted off) 89'
MF	32	(Argentina) Agustín Almendra		(substituted off) 71'
MF	21	(Colombia) Jorman Campuzano
MF	20	(Argentina) Juan Ramírez	(yellow card) 62' (yellow-red card) 66'
MF	8	(Colombia) Edwin Cardona	(yellow card) 67'	(substituted off) 71'
FW	22	(Colombia) Sebastián Villa		(substituted off) 89'
FW	38	(Argentina) Luis Vázquez		(substituted off) 82'
Substitutes:
GK	13	(Argentina) Javier García
DF	2	(Argentina) Lisandro López
DF	37	(Argentina) Agustín Sández		(substituted on) 82'
DF	40	(Argentina) Eros Mancuso
MF	11	(Argentina) Eduardo Salvio		(substituted on) 89'
MF	14	(Argentina) Esteban Rolón
MF	16	(Argentina) Aaron Molinas
MF	23	(Argentina) Diego González		(substituted on) 71'
MF	33	(Argentina) Alan Varela
MF	36	(Argentina) Cristian Medina		(substituted on) 71'
FW	29	(Armenia) Norberto Briasco
FW	31	(Argentina) Cristian Pavón		(substituted on) 89'
Manager:
(Argentina) Sebastián Battaglia

Man of the Match:
Agustín Rossi (Boca Juniors)

Assistant referees:
Juan Pablo Belatti
Pablo González
Fourth official:
Andrés Merlos
Fifth official:
Facundo Rodríguez

**Match rules**

- 90 minutes.
- Penalty shoot-out if scores still level.
- Twelve named substitutes.
- Maximum of five substitutions.

=== Statistics ===
Overall
	Talleres (C)	Boca Juniors
Goals scored	0	0
Total shots	7	7
Shots on target	3	4
Ball possession	51%	49%
Corner kicks	3	3
Fouls committed	16	16
Offsides	3	1
Yellow cards	4	4
Red cards	0	1
