= Nahuel Bustos =

Argentine footballer

Personal information
- Full name: Nahuel Lautaro Bustos
- Date of birth: 4 July 1998 (age 28)
- Place of birth: Córdoba, Argentina
- Height: 1.76 m (5 ft 9 in)
- Position: Forward

Team information
- Current team: Santa Fe
- Number: 19

Youth career
- 2003–2012: Huracán de Córdoba
- 2012–2014: Argentino Peñarol
- 2014–2016: Talleres

Senior career*
Years	Team	Apps	(Gls)
2013	Argentino Peñarol	1	(1)
2016–2020	Talleres	36	(14)
2018–2019	→ Pachuca (loan)	4	(0)
2020–2023	Manchester City	0	(0)
2020–2022	→ Girona (loan)	75	(13)
2022	→ São Paulo (loan)	9	(1)
2023	→ Talleres (loan)	12	(3)
2023–	Talleres	58	(9)
2024	→ San Lorenzo (loan)	18	(1)
2026–	→ Santa Fe (loan)	31	(9)
- * Club domestic league appearances and goals as of 20 January 2026

Nahuel Lautaro Bustos (born 4 July 1998) is an Argentine professional footballer who plays as a forward for Liga DIMAYOR club Santa Fe.

== Club career ==
=== Early career ===
Born in Córdoba, Bustos started playing for hometown side CA Huracán at the age of five. He subsequently moved to Argentino Peñarol, and on 24 February 2013, at the age of just 14 years, seven months and 20 days, he made his senior debut for the latter side by coming on as a substitute and scoring the fifth goal in a 7–0 Torneo Argentino C routing of CA Racing de Valle Hermoso.

=== Talleres ===
On 5 March 2014, Argentino Peñarol's president Ariel Allende announced that Bustos was sold to a businessman group for a fee of 40,000 pesos, and was assigned to Talleres. On 12 June of the following year, he signed his first professional contract with the club.

After appearing as an unused substitute in April 2016 for Primera B Nacional fixtures against Almagro, Gimnasia y Esgrima and Atlético Paraná, Bustos made his senior debut on 18 June, replacing Nazareno Solís late into a 1–1 away draw against Chacarita Juniors, as his side was already promoted. He made his Primera División debut on 23 April 2017, replacing Jony in a 1–0 home win against Godoy Cruz.

Bustos was part of the club's squad for the 2018 U-20 Copa Libertadores in Uruguay, a competition in which Bustos scored four goals in three matches, including a hat-trick against Atlético Venezuela. He only became a regular first team starter in September of that year, under manager Juan Pablo Vojvoda.

Bustos scored his first professional goal on 22 September 2018, netting the opener in a 1–1 home draw against Vélez Sarsfield. On 7 October, he scored a brace in a 3–0 home defeat of rivals Belgrano, taking his tally up to four goals in four matches. In 2019–20, Bustos scored ten goals in twenty-three appearances in all competitions before the season's curtailment due to the COVID-19 pandemic.

==== Loan to Pachuca ====
On 28 December 2018, Talleres announced that Bustos had joined Liga MX side Pachuca on loan, signing for twelve months. He netted his first goal on 8 January 2019 in a Copa MX victory at Atlante. Bustos returned to Talleres on 20 July, having featured a total of eight times for Pachuca.

=== Manchester City ===
On 5 October 2020, Talleres reached an agreement with Premier League club Manchester City for the transfer of Bustos.

==== Loan to Girona ====
Bustos subsequently joined City Football Group club Girona in the Segunda División for the 2020–2021 season. He debuted in a 1–0 win over Real Oviedo on 18 October, before scoring his first two goals for the club in the Copa del Rey against Tercera División outfit Gimnástica Segoviana on 17 December.

==== Loan to São Paulo ====
On 5 August 2022, Bustos joined Série A club São Paulo on loan until June 2023, with the option for an additional year.

=== Return to Talleres ===
On 23 December 2022, Bustos returned to Talleres on an initial loan deal for the duration of the 2023 season. Midway through the season, on 30 June 2023, following a successful first half of the loan spell, Bustos was signed by Talleres on a permanent deal until December 2025 for an undisclosed fee.

==== Loan to San Lorenzo ====
On 1 August 2024, Bustos was loaned out to fellow Primera División club San Lorenzo for twelve months, with an option for the loan to be terminated. On 28 December, the loan was cancelled and Bustos returned to Talleres.

== International career ==
Bustos was called up to train with the Argentina U20 team ahead of the 2017 FIFA U-20 World Cup in South Korea, but was cut from the final squad.

== Career statistics ==
As of 27 August 2024

Club statistics
Club	Season	League			Cup		League Cup		Continental		Other		Total	
Club	Season	Division	Apps	Goals	Apps	Goals	Apps	Goals	Apps	Goals	Apps	Goals	Apps	Goals
Argentino Peñarol	2013	Torneo Argentino C	1	1	—		—		—		—		1	1
Talleres	2016	Primera B Nacional	1	0	0	0	—		—		—		1	0
Talleres	2016–17	Primera División	4	0	0	0	—		—		—		4	0
Talleres	2017–18	Primera División	0	0	0	0	—		—		—		0	0
Talleres	2018–19	Primera División	11	5	0	0	0	0	0	0	—		11	5
Talleres	2019–20	Primera División	20	9	2	0	1	1	—		—		23	10
Talleres	Total		36	14	2	0	1	1	0	0	—		39	15
Pachuca (loan)	2018–19	Liga MX	4	0	4	1	—		—		—		8	1
Manchester City	2020–21	Premier League	0	0	0	0	0	0	0	0	0	0	0	0
Manchester City	2021–22	Premier League	0	0	0	0	0	0	0	0	0	0	0	0
Manchester City	2022–23	Premier League	0	0	0	0	0	0	0	0	0	0	0	0
Manchester City	Total		0	0	0	0	0	0	0	0	0	0	0	0
Girona (loan)	2020–21	Segunda División	30	2	4	2	—		—		4 (Note: Appearances in La Liga play-offs)	0	34	4
Girona (loan)	2021–22	Segunda División	38	11	3	2	—		—		3	0	41	13
Girona (loan)	Total		68	13	7	4	—		—		7	0	75	17
São Paulo (loan)	2022	Série A	9	1	0	0	—		0	0	0	0	9	1
Talleres	2023	Primera División	21	7	4	1	12	3	—		—		37	11
Talleres	2024	Primera División	1	0	1	1	12	1	5	0	—		19	
Talleres	Total		22	7	5	2	24	4	5	0	0	0	56	13
San Lorenzo (loan)	2024	Primera División	4	0	1	0	0	0	2	0	0	0	7	0
Career total			144	35	15	7	25	5	7	0	7	0	187	46

== Honours ==
Argentino Peñarol

- Torneo del Interior: 2013

Talleres

- Primera B Nacional: 2016

Individual

- Segunda División Player of the Month: March 2022
