= Malagueño =

Malagueño is the name of:

- Atlético Malagueño, Spanish football club
- Franco Malagueño, Argentine footballer
- Javier Malagueño, Argentine footballer
