= Marcos Arturia =

Argentine professional footballer

Personal information
- Full name: Marcos Luis Arturia
- Date of birth: 8 February 1998 (age 28)
- Place of birth: San Martín, Argentina
- Height: 1.87 m (6 ft 2 in)
- Position: Forward

Team information
- Current team: Deportes Limache
- Number: 26

Youth career
- Deportivo Español

Senior career*
Years	Team	Apps	(Gls)
2014	San Martín Mendoza		
2015	Montecaseros	10	(1)
2016–2025	Talleres	2	(0)
2019	→ Villa Dálmine (loan)	9	(1)
2021–2022	→ Estudiantes RC (loan)	56	(4)
2023	→ San Martín SJ (loan)	29	(3)
2024	→ Temperley (loan)	32	(6)
2025	Banfield	15	(1)
2026–	Deportes Limache	1	(0)
- * Club domestic league appearances and goals as of 1 February 2026

Marcos Luis Arturia (born 8 February 1998) is an Argentine professional footballer who plays as a forward for Chilean club Deportes Limache.

== Career ==
Arturia spent time in the youth system of Deportivo Español. In 2014, Arturia appeared in Torneo Federal B with San Martín, which preceded a spell in the same competition in 2015 with Deportivo Montecaseros; scoring one goal in ten matches. Primera B Nacional side Talleres signed Arturia at the beginning of 2016. He featured for the club's academy at the 2018 U-20 Copa Libertadores, netting against São Paulo as Talleres were eliminated at the group stages. On 23 November 2018, with the club now in the Argentine Primera División, Arturia made his professional debut during a victory away to Argentinos Juniors.

After one further appearance for Talleres, Arturia subsequently departed on loan in July 2019 to Primera B Nacional's Villa Dálmine. He scored on his competitive debut for them, netting in a 2–0 win over Instituto on 17 August.

In January 2026, Arturia moved to Chile and signed with Liga de Primera club Deportes Limache.

== Career statistics ==
As of 7 October 2020.

Club statistics
Club	Season	League			Cup		League Cup		Continental		Other		Total	
Club	Season	Division	Apps	Goals	Apps	Goals	Apps	Goals	Apps	Goals	Apps	Goals	Apps	Goals
Deportivo Montecaseros	2015	Torneo Federal B	10	1	0	0	—		—		0	0	10	1
Talleres	2016	Primera B Nacional	0	0	0	0	—		—		0	0	0	0
Talleres	2016–17	Primera División	0	0	0	0	—		—		0	0	0	0
Talleres	2017–18	Primera División	0	0	0	0	—		—		0	0	0	0
Talleres	2018–19	Primera División	2	0	0	0	—		—		0	0	2	0
Talleres	2019–20	Primera División	0	0	0	0	—		—		0	0	0	0
Talleres	Total		2	0	0	0	—		—		0	0	2	0
Villa Dálmine (loan)	2019–20	Primera B Nacional	9	1	0	0	—		—		0	0	9	1
Career total			21	2	0	0	—		—		0	0	21	2
