= 2017–18 Talleres de Córdoba season =

Talleres de Córdoba
2017–18 season
- Chairman: Andrés Fassi
- Manager: Frank Darío Kudelka
- Stadium: Estadio La Boutique; Estadio Mario Alberto Kempes
- Primera División: 4th
- 2016–17 Copa Argentina: Round of 32
- 2017–18 Copa Argentina: Round of 64
- Top goalscorer: League: Three players (3); All: Three players (3)

The 2017–18 season is Talleres de Córdoba's 2nd consecutive season in the top-flight of Argentine football. The season covers the period from 1 July 2017 to 30 June 2018.

== Current squad ==
As of 5 February 2018.

Note: Flags indicate national team as defined under FIFA eligibility rules; some limited exceptions apply. Players may hold more than one non-FIFA nationality.

No.	Pos.	Nation	Player
1	GK	ARG	Mauricio Caranta
2	DF	ARG	Carlos Quintana
3	DF	ARG	Javier Gandolfi
4	DF	ARG	Alejandro Maciel
5	MF	ARG	Pablo Guiñazú
6	DF	URU	Lucas Olaza
7	FW	ECU	Joao Rojas (on loan from Cruz Azul)
8	FW	ARG	Matías Pisano
9	FW	URU	Junior Arias
10	FW	ARG	Nicolás Giménez
11	MF	ARG	Aldo Araujo
12	GK	ARG	Kevin Humeler
13	DF	ARG	Juan Cruz Komar
14	DF	ARG	Nahuel Tenaglia (on loan from Atlanta)
15	MF	ARG	Fernando Godoy
16	MF	ARG	Fernando Juárez

No.	Pos.	Nation	Player
17	FW	VEN	Samuel Sosa
18	MF	ARG	Cristian Ramírez (on loan from Lanús)
19	FW	ARG	Mauro Ortiz (on loan from Deportivo Riestra)
20	MF	ARG	Juan Ramírez (on loan from Colorado Rapids)
21	MF	USA	Joel Soñora
22	GK	ARG	Guido Herrera
23	FW	URU	Santiago Silva
24	FW	ARG	Nahuel Bustos
25	DF	ARG	Leonardo Godoy
26	DF	ARG	Ian Escobar
28	FW	ARG	Cristian Ojeda
29	MF	ARG	Alexis Messidoro (on loan from Boca Juniors)
30	DF	ARG	Facundo Medina
32	FW	ARG	Marcelo Torres (on loan from Boca Juniors)
35	DF	ARG	Franco Malagueño

=== Out on loan ===
Note: Flags indicate national team as defined under FIFA eligibility rules; some limited exceptions apply. Players may hold more than one non-FIFA nationality.

No.	Pos.	Nation	Player
—	GK	ARG	Ezequiel Mastrolía (at Mitre until 30 June 2018)
—	MF	PAR	Rodrigo Burgos (at Olimpia until 30 June 2018)
—	MF	ARG	Ivo Chaves (at San Martín until 30 June 2018)
—	MF	ARG	Andrés Cubas (at Defensa y Justicia until 30 June 2018)

== Transfers ==
=== In ===
Date	Pos.	Name	From	Fee
20 July 2017	GK	(Argentina) Ezequiel Mastrolía	(Argentina) Platense	Free
23 July 2017	FW	(Uruguay) Junior Arias	(Uruguay) Peñarol	Undisclosed
26 July 2017	DF	(Uruguay) Lucas Olaza	(Uruguay) Danubio	Undisclosed
January 2018	MF	(United States) Joel Soñora	(Germany) Stuttgart II	Free
January 2018	FW	(Venezuela) Samuel Sosa	(Venezuela) Deportivo Táchira	Undisclosed
January 2018	FW	(Uruguay) Santiago Silva	(Chile) Universidad Católica	Free
January 2018	DF	(Argentina) Facundo Medina	(Argentina) River Plate	Undisclosed
January 2018	MF	(Argentina) Matías Pisano	(Argentina) Tijuana	Free

=== Out ===
Date	Pos.	Name	To	Fee
1 July 2017	GK	(Argentina) Ignacio Chicco	(Argentina) Colón	Loan return
1 July 2017	DF	(Uruguay) Guillermo Cotugno	(Russia) Rubin Kazan	Loan return
1 July 2017	MF	(Argentina) Leonardo Gil	(Argentina) Estudiantes	Loan return
1 July 2017	FW	(Chile) Carlos Muñoz	(Chile) Unión Española	Loan return
1 July 2017	FW	(Argentina) Ezequiel Rescaldani	(Colombia) Atlético Nacional	Loan return
18 July 2017	FW	(Argentina) Sebastián Palacios	(Mexico) Pachuca	U$S 5.600.000
20 July 2017	DF	(Argentina) Wilfredo Olivera	(Argentina) Atlético de Rafaela	Free
20 July 2017	DF	(Argentina) Lucas Kruspzky	(Argentina) Aldosivi	Free
31 July 2017	FW	(Argentina) Gonzalo Klusener	(Argentina) Atlético de Rafaela	Free
3 August 2017	FW	(Argentina) Victorio Ramis	(Argentina) Godoy Cruz	U$S 750.000 (50%)
23 January 2018	FW	(Argentina) Jonathan Menéndez	(Argentina) Independiente	U$S 3.000.000 (90%)
23 January 2018	FW	(Argentina) Emanuel Reynoso	(Argentina) Boca Juniors	U$S 1.500.000 (60%)

=== Loan in ===
Date from	Date to	Pos.	Name	From
18 July 2017	1 December 2017	FW	(Argentina) Sebastián Palacios	(Mexico) Pachuca
19 July 2017	30 June 2018	MF	(Ecuador) Joao Rojas	(Mexico) Cruz Azul
20 July 2017	30 June 2018	MF	(Argentina) Cristian Ramírez	(Argentina) Lanús
July 2017	June 2018	MF	(Argentina) Nahuel Tenaglia	(Argentina) Atlanta
July 2017	January 2018	MF	(Argentina) Gabriel Ramírez	(Argentina) Lanús
July 2017	June 2018	FW	(Argentina) Mauro Ortiz	(Argentina) Deportivo Riestra
July 2017	June 2018	FW	(Argentina) Marcelo Torres	(Argentina) Boca Juniors
January 2018	June 2019	MF	(Argentina) Alexis Messidoro	(Argentina) Boca Juniors

=== Loan out ===
Date from	Date to	Pos.	Name	To
July 2017	June 2018	GK	(Argentina) Ezequiel Mastrolía	(Argentina) Mitre
July 2017	June 2018	GK	(Argentina) Ivo Chaves	(Argentina) San Martín

== Friendlies ==
=== Pre-season ===
Win Draw Loss

22 July 2017 Friendly	Mitre (Argentina)	3–0	(Argentina) Talleres	Salta, Argentina
	J. Rojas; V. Ramis; S. Palacios	Report

22 July 2017 Friendly	Pellegrini (Argentina)	0–0	(Argentina) Talleres	Salta, Argentina
		Report

27 July 2017 Friendly	Talleres (Argentina)	4–1	(Argentina) Las Palmas	Córdoba, Argentina
	E. Reynoso; S. Palacios; C. Ramírez; J. Menéndez	Report	Márquez

27 July 2017 Friendly	Talleres (Argentina)	3–0	(Argentina) Las Palmas	Córdoba, Argentina
	C. Sánchez; N. Giménez; I. Escobar	Report

29 July 2017 Friendly	Talleres (Argentina)	2–0	(Argentina) Newell's Old Boys	Córdoba, Argentina
10:00	A. Araujo; N. Giménez	Report		Stadium: Estadio La Boutique; Referee: Federico Cejas (Argentina)

29 July 2017 Friendly	Talleres (Argentina)	2–0	(Argentina) Newell's Old Boys	Córdoba, Argentina
11:15	J. Komar; J. Arias	Report		Stadium: Estadio La Boutique; Referee: Federico Cejas (Argentina)

== Primera División ==
=== League table ===
Pos	Team	Pld	W	D	L	GF	GA	GD	Pts	Qualification
3	San Lorenzo	27	14	8	5	31	20	+11	50	Qualification for Copa Libertadores group stage
4	Huracán	27	13	9	5	35	24	+11	48	Qualification for Copa Libertadores group stage
5	Talleres (C)	27	13	7	7	33	20	+13	46	Qualification for Copa Libertadores second stage
6	Independiente	27	13	7	7	29	19	+10	46	Qualification for Copa Sudamericana first stage
7	Racing	27	13	6	8	46	32	+14	45	Qualification for Copa Sudamericana first stage

Source: AFA
Rules for classification: 1) points; 2) play-off (only if needed to decide championship); 3) goal difference; 4) goals scored; 5) head-to-head points; 6) head-to-head goal difference; 7) head-to-head goals scored.

=== Results by matchday ===
Matchday	1	2	3	4	5	6	7	8	9	10	11	12	13	14	15	16	17	18	19	20	21	22	23	24	25	26	27
Ground	H	A	H	A	H	A	H	A	H	A	H	A	H														
Result	W	L	D	W	W	D	W	D	L	W	L	W															
Position	1	9	11	8	4	6	3	3	6	6	6	4															

Updated to match(es) played on 12 December 2017. Source: Soccerway
A = Away; H = Home; W = Win; D = Draw; L = Loss

26 August 2017 1	Talleres (Argentina)	5–2	(Argentina) Lanús	Córdoba, Argentina
18:05	J. Arias 87'; S. Palacios 61' (pen.), 70'; J. Menéndez 87'; M. Torres 90+4'	Report	R. Martínez 57'; G. Denis 83'	Stadium: Estadio Mario Alberto Kempes; Referee: Mauro Vigliano (Argentina)

10 September 2017 2	Godoy Cruz (Argentina)	2–1	(Argentina) Talleres	Mendoza, Argentina
14:05	J. Garro 29'; S. García 90+4'	Report	J. Rojas 83'	Stadium: Estadio Malvinas Argentinas; Referee: Darío Herrera (Argentina)

17 September 2017 3	Talleres (Argentina)	0–0	(Argentina) Vélez Sarsfield	Córdoba, Argentina
11:05		Report		Stadium: Estadio La Boutique; Referee: Nicolás Lamolina (Argentina)

23 September 2017 4	Chacarita Juniors (Argentina)	0–1	(Argentina) Talleres	Villa Maipú, Argentina
16:15		Report	L. Olaza 56'	Stadium: Estadio de Chacarita Juniors; Referee: Germán Delfino (Argentina)

1 October 2017 5	Talleres (Argentina)	1–0	(Argentina) Patronato	Córdoba, Argentina
11:05	J. Arias 76'	Report		Stadium: Estadio Mario Alberto Kempes; Referee: Fernando Rapallini (Argentina)

15 October 2017 6	Belgrano (Argentina)	0–0	(Argentina) Talleres	Córdoba, Argentina
16:05		Report		Stadium: El Gigante de Alberdi; Referee: Ariel Penel (Argentina)

28 October 2017 7	Talleres (Argentina)	4–0	(Argentina) River Plate	Córdoba, Argentina
20:20	J. Ramírez 44', 69'; M. Torres 78'; L. Olaza 81' (pen.)	Report		Stadium: Estadio Mario Alberto Kempes; Referee: Hernán Mastrángelo (Argentina)

4 November 2017 8	Racing Club (Argentina)	1–1	(Argentina) Talleres	Avellaneda, Argentina
21:30	A. Ibargüen 66'	Report	M. Torres 53'	Stadium: Estadio Presidente Juan Domingo Perón; Referee: Fernando Rapallini (Argentina)

20 November 2017 9	Talleres (Argentina)	0–1	(Argentina) Rosario Central	Córdoba, Argentina
21:30		Report	F. Zampedri 62'	Stadium: Estadio Mario Alberto Kempes; Referee: Jorge Baliño (Argentina)

27 November 2017 10	Arsenal de Sarandí (Argentina)	0–1	(Argentina) Talleres	Avellaneda, Argentina
17:00		Report	N. Giménez 4'	Stadium: Estadio Julio Humberto Grondona; Referee: Mauro Vigliano (Argentina)

3 December 2017 11	Talleres (Argentina)	0–1	(Argentina) Estudiantes	Córdoba, Argentina
17:30		Report	L. Melano 16'	Stadium: Estadio Mario Alberto Kempes; Referee: Diego Abal (Argentina)

10 December 2017 12	Colón (Argentina)	0–2	(Argentina) Talleres	Santa Fe, Argentina
19:15		Report	J. Arias 17'; S. Palacios 74'	Stadium: Estadio Brigadier General Estanislao López; Referee: Jorge Baliño (Argentina)

January 2018 13	Talleres (Argentina)	–	(Argentina) San Lorenzo	Córdoba, Argentina
		Report		Stadium: Estadio Mario Alberto Kempes

== Copa Argentina ==
Win Draw Loss

1 September 2017 R32	Talleres (Argentina)	1–1 (2–4 p)	(Argentina) Gimnasia y Esgrima (M)	Santa Fe, Argentina
18:00	E. Reynoso 90+5'	Report	P. Cortizo 88'	Stadium: Estadio Brigadier General Estanislao López; Referee: Mariano González (Argentina)
	Penalties
	N. Giménez (penalty missed); E. Reynoso (penalty scored); J. Menéndez (penalty scored); S. Palacios (penalty missed)		P. Cortizo (penalty scored); L. Becerra (penalty scored); L. Aguirre (penalty scored); S. Domínguez (penalty missed); L. Fernández (penalty scored)
