= Gastón Torres =

Argentine professional footballer

Personal information
- Full name: Gastón Alberto Torres
- Date of birth: 2 February 2000 (age 26)
- Place of birth: Morteros, Argentina
- Height: 1.67 m (5 ft 6 in)
- Position: Midfielder

Team information
- Current team: Ferro Pico

Youth career
- CAR Juventud Unida
- 2015–2020: Talleres

Senior career*
Years	Team	Apps	(Gls)
2020–2021	Talleres	1	(0)
2022–	Ferro Pico	1	(0)
- * Club domestic league appearances and goals as of 18:38, 8 May 2022 (UTC)

Gastón Alberto Torres (born 2 February 2000) is an Argentine professional footballer who plays as a midfielder for Ferro General Pico.

== Career ==
Torres completed a move to Talleres in 2015, having previously spent time with Club Atlético Recreativo Juventud Unida de Barrancas. With Talleres, Torres made one appearance at the 2018 U-20 Copa Libertadores against Bolivian outfit Quebracho. He was moved into the first-team under manager Alexander Medina in 2020, initially appearing on the bench for Copa de la Liga Profesional encounters against Newell's Old Boys (2), Lanús and Boca Juniors in October and November. Torres' senior debut soon arrived on 29 November, featuring in a defeat away from home in the aforementioned competition against Lanús. In March 2022, Torres joined Ferro General Pico on loan until the end of the year.

== Career statistics ==
As of 1 December 2020.

Appearances and goals by club, season and competition
Club	Season	League			Cup		League Cup		Continental		Other		Total	
Club	Season	Division	Apps	Goals	Apps	Goals	Apps	Goals	Apps	Goals	Apps	Goals	Apps	Goals
Talleres	2020–21 (Note: Soccerway counts Copa de la Liga Profesional appearances as league appearances.)	Primera División	1	0	0	0	0	0	—		0	0	1	0
Career total			1	0	0	0	0	0	—		0	0	1	0
