= Fernando Juárez =

Argentine footballer

Personal information
- Full name: Fernando Ezequiel Juárez
- Date of birth: 23 August 1998 (age 28)
- Place of birth: Santiago del Estero, Argentina
- Height: 1.77 m (5 ft 9 1/2 in)
- Position: Midfielder

Team information
- Current team: Central Córdoba SdE (on loan from Platense)
- Number: 8

Youth career
- 2010–2016: Talleres

Senior career*
Years	Team	Apps	(Gls)
2016–2025	Talleres	24	(0)
2019–2021	→ Agropecuario (loan)	47	(0)
2022–2023	→ Floriana (loan)	7	(0)
2023	→ Audax Italiano (loan)	20	(0)
2024	→ Platense (loan)	34	(0)
2025–	Platense	17	(0)
2025–	→ Central Córdoba SdE (loan)	14	(0)
- * Club domestic league appearances and goals as of 16:18, 9 May 2026 (UTC)

Fernando Ezequiel Juárez (born 23 August 1998) is an Argentine professional footballer who plays as a midfielder for Central Córdoba SdE, on loan from Platense.

== Career ==
Juárez signed for Talleres in 2010. He first appeared in the Talleres first-team squad during the 2016 Primera B Nacional campaign, making his professional debut on 12 February in a 2–1 victory over Villa Dálmine. It was the first of six appearances in 2016, a season which ended with promotion to the Argentine Primera División. In 2018, Juárez represented the club's U20 team at the 2018 U-20 Copa Libertadores in Uruguay.

== Career statistics ==
As of 10 May 2018.

Club statistics
Club	Season	League			Cup (Note: Includes the Copa Argentina)		League Cup		Continental		Other		Total	
Club	Season	Division	Apps	Goals	Apps	Goals	Apps	Goals	Apps	Goals	Apps	Goals	Apps	Goals
Talleres	2016	Primera B Nacional	5	0	1	0	—		—		0	0	6	0
Talleres	2016–17	Primera División	0	0	0	0	—		—		0	0	0	0
Talleres	2017–18	Primera División	0	0	0	0	—		—		0	0	0	0
Career total			5	0	1	0	—		—		0	0	6	0

== Honours ==
Talleres

- Primera B Nacional: 2016

Platense

- Argentine Primera División: 2025 Apertura
