= Renzo Paparelli =

Argentine footballer

Personal information
- Full name: Renzo Paparelli Coldorf
- Date of birth: 24 March 1997 (age 29)
- Place of birth: Corral de Bustos, Argentina
- Height: 1.84 m (6 ft 1/2 in)
- Position: Centre-back

Team information
- Current team: Central Norte (on loan from Talleres)

Youth career
- 2013–2019: Talleres

Senior career*
Years	Team	Apps	(Gls)
2019–	Talleres	5	(0)
2020	→ Atenas (loan)	18	(2)
2022–	→ Central Norte (loan)	4	(0)
- * Club domestic league appearances and goals as of 18:14, 10 May 2022 (UTC)

Renzo Paparelli Coldorf (born 24 March 1997) is an Argentine professional footballer who plays as a centre-back for Talleres.

== Career ==
Paparelli began his career with Talleres, having signed in 2013. He was moved into their senior squad in February 2019 for a Primera División fixture with Atlético Tucumán, which he subsequently started and played eighty-nine minutes of a scoreless draw at the Estadio Monumental José Fierro being before subbed off for Enzo Díaz. Four more appearances followed for him up until August 2020, when the defender left on loan to Uruguayan Segunda División side Atenas. Paparelli scored goals versus Villa Teresa on 18 September and Sud América on 30 October, having made his debut in the preceding August against Rocha. At the end of January 2022, Paparelli joined Central Norte on a one-year loan.

== Career statistics ==
As of 22 March 2021.

Club statistics
Club	Season	League			Cup		League Cup		Continental		Other		Total	
Club	Season	Division	Apps	Goals	Apps	Goals	Apps	Goals	Apps	Goals	Apps	Goals	Apps	Goals
Talleres	2018–19	Primera División	3	0	0	0	0	0	0	0	0	0	3	0
Talleres	2019–20	Primera División	2	0	0	0	0	0	—		0	0	2	0
Talleres	2020–21	Primera División	0	0	0	0	0	0	—		0	0	0	0
Talleres	2021	Primera División	0	0	0	0	—		0	0	0	0	0	0
Talleres	Total		5	0	0	0	0	0	0	0	0	0	5	0
Atenas (loan)	2020	Segunda División	18	2	—		—		—		0	0	18	2
Career total			23	2	0	0	0	0	0	0	0	0	23	2
