= Joaquín Blázquez =

Argentine footballer (born 2001)

Personal information
- Full name: Joaquín Blázquez
- Date of birth: 28 January 2001 (age 25)
- Place of birth: Luque, Argentina
- Height: 1.93 m (6 ft 4 in)
- Position: Goalkeeper

Team information
- Current team: Independiente (on loan from Talleres)
- Number: 1

Youth career
- 2013–2019: Talleres
- 2019: → Valencia (loan)

Senior career*
Years	Team	Apps	(Gls)
2019–	Talleres	4	(0)
2019	→ Valencia B (loan)	0	(0)
2022–2023	→ Brest (loan)	1	(0)
2024	→ Platense (loan)	0	(0)
2025–	→ Independiente (loan)	0	(0)

International career^{‡}
2019	Argentina U18		
2019	Argentina U20	4	(0)
2020–2021	Argentina U23	2	(0)
- * Club domestic league appearances and goals as of 18:48, 30 January 2025 (UTC) ‡ National team caps and goals as of 11 June 2021

Joaquín Blázquez (born 28 January 2001) is an Argentine professional footballer who plays as a goalkeeper for Independiente, on loan from Talleres. (Note: Joaquín Blázquez at Soccerway)

== Club career ==
Blázquez was spotted by Talleres scouts in 2013, as he soon joined the Córdoba club. In November 2017, having just signed his first professional contract at the age of sixteen, Blázquez had a week's trial at Premier League outfit Liverpool. Months after trialling in England, Blázquez made three appearances at the 2018 U-20 Copa Libertadores for Talleres. In February 2019, Blázquez completed a loan move to Spain with Valencia B of Segunda División B. He mainly featured for their youth in the División de Honor Juvenil and UEFA Youth League, appearing four times in the latter, but did make the B-team's bench four times.

Despite signing for eighteen months and with a purchase option, Blázquez departed Valencia B at the beginning of 2020 after they declined to sign him. He soon made the substitute's bench for Talleres' matches in the Primera División against Huracán and Patronato in February and March. Blázquez made his senior debut on 19 December in a Copa de la Liga Profesional home draw versus Atlético Tucumán, after replacing an injured Marcos Díaz after just sixteen minutes; back-up goalkeeper Mauricio Caranta had already been ruled out due to injury.

On 27 July 2022, Blázquez joined Brest in France on loan, with an option to buy.

== International career ==
Blázquez represented Argentina at U18, U20 and U23 level. For the U18s, he featured at the 2019 COTIF Tournament in Spain. For the U20s, Blázquez was on the bench for his country's four matches at the 2019 FIFA U-20 World Cup in Poland. For the U23s, he went unused for seven games as Argentina won the 2020 CONMEBOL Pre-Olympic Tournament in Colombia. In November 2018, Blázquez trained against the senior squad ahead of their friendlies with Mexico.

== Career statistics ==
As of 20 December 2020

Appearances and goals by club, season and competition
Club	Season	League			National cup		League cup		Continental		Other		Total	
Club	Season	Division	Apps	Goals	Apps	Goals	Apps	Goals	Apps	Goals	Apps	Goals	Apps	Goals
Talleres	2018–19	Primera División	0	0	0	0	0	0	—		0	0	0	0
Talleres	2019–20	Primera División	0	0	0	0	0	0	—		0	0	0	0
Talleres	2020–21 (Note: Soccerway counts Copa de la Liga Profesional appearances as league appearances.)	Primera División	1	0	0	0	0	0	—		0	0	1	0
Talleres	Total		1	0	0	0	0	0	—		0	0	1	0
Valencia B (loan)	2018–19	Segunda División B	0	0	—		—		—		0	0	0	0
Valencia B (loan)	2019–20	Segunda División B	0	0	—		—		—		0	0	0	0
Valencia B (loan)	Total		0	0	—		—		—		0	0	0	0
Career total			1	0	0	0	0	0	—		0	0	1	0

== Honours ==
Argentina U23

- CONMEBOL Pre-Olympic Tournament: 2020
