= Ivo Chaves =

Argentine professional footballer

Personal information
- Full name: Ivo Facundo Chaves
- Date of birth: 30 June 1993 (age 33)
- Place of birth: Salta, Argentina
- Height: 1.74 m (5 ft 8 1/2 in)
- Position: Midfielder

Team information
- Current team: Gimnasia y Tiro

Youth career
- Gimnasia y Tiro

Senior career*
Years	Team	Apps	(Gls)
2012–2014	Gimnasia y Tiro	58	(7)
2014–2018	Talleres	67	(8)
2017	→ San Martín (loan)	0	(0)
2018	→ Gimnasia y Tiro (loan)	2	(0)
2020–	Gimnasia y Tiro	170	(20)
- * Club domestic league appearances and goals as of 17:59, 28 April 2026 (UTC)

Ivo Facundo Chaves (born 30 June 1993) is an Argentine professional footballer who plays as a midfielder for Gimnasia y Tiro.

== Career ==
Chaves started his career with Gimnasia y Tiro in 2012. He scored goals in Torneo Argentino A against Talleres and Alumni in his debut season of 2011–12, prior to netting six times in fifty-one appearances across the following two campaigns. On 1 July 2014, Chaves joined Torneo Federal A's Talleres. Ten goals in seventy appearances followed in three seasons as Talleres won consecutive promotions to the Argentine Primera División. He made his top-flight bow against Colón on 16 September 2016. In August 2017, Chaves was loaned to San Martín. However, he returned months later without featuring.

January 2018 saw Chaves leave on loan again, joining former club Gimnasia y Tiro in Torneo Federal A on loan. He terminated his contract with Talleres in September 2018, following issues with chronic fatigue and hypogonadism. Ahead of January 2020, Chaves made a return to football with Gimnasia y Tiro. He scored one goal in two matches for the Torneo Regional Federal Amateur club, prior to the division's curtailment due to the COVID-19 pandemic.

== Career statistics ==
As of 5 September 2020.

Club statistics
Club	Season	League			Cup		League Cup		Continental		Other		Total	
Club	Season	Division	Apps	Goals	Apps	Goals	Apps	Goals	Apps	Goals	Apps	Goals	Apps	Goals
Gimnasia y Tiro	2011–12	Torneo Argentino A	13	2	0	0	—		—		0	0	13	2
Gimnasia y Tiro	2012–13	Torneo Argentino A	26	3	1	0	—		—		2 (Note: Appearance(s) in the Torneo Argentino A play-offs)	0	29	3
Gimnasia y Tiro	2013–14	Torneo Argentino A	19	2	1	0	—		—		2	1	22	3
Gimnasia y Tiro	Total		58	7	2	0	—		—		4	1	64	8
Talleres	2014	Torneo Federal A	17	3	2	2	—		—		0	0	19	5
Talleres	2015	Torneo Federal A	29	4	0	0	—		—		0	0	29	4
Talleres	2016	Primera B Nacional	21	1	1	0	—		—		0	0	22	1
Talleres	2016–17	Primera División	1	0	0	0	—		—		0	0	1	0
Talleres	2017–18	Primera División	0	0	0	0	—		—		0	0	0	0
Talleres	Total		67	8	3	2	—		—		0	0	70	10
San Martín (loan)	2017–18	Primera B Nacional	0	0	0	0	—		—		0	0	0	0
Gimnasia y Tiro (loan)	2017–18	Torneo Federal A	2	0	0	0	—		—		0	0	2	0
Gimnasia y Tiro	2020	Torneo Amateur	2	1	0	0	—		—		0	0	2	1
Career total			129	16	5	2	—		—		4	1	138	19

== Honours ==
Talleres

- Primera B Nacional: 2016
