= Mauro Valiente =

Argentine footballer

Personal information
- Full name: Mauro Abrahán Valiente
- Date of birth: 26 January 2000 (age 26)
- Place of birth: Luque, Argentina
- Height: 1.80 m (5 ft 11 in)
- Position: Forward

Team information
- Current team: Estudiantes RC
- Number: 22

Youth career
- 2012–2013: Cultural Luque
- 2013–2018: Talleres

Senior career*
Years	Team	Apps	(Gls)
2018–2023	Talleres	5	(0)
2020	→ Rentistas (loan)	9	(1)
2021–2022	→ Alvarado (loan)	51	(5)
2023–	Estudiantes RC	121	(6)
- * Club domestic league appearances and goals as of 17:50, 8 November 2026 (UTC)

Mauro Abrahán Valiente (born 26 January 2000) is an Argentine professional footballer who plays as a forward for Estudiantes RC.

== Club career ==
Valiente's career began with Talleres, who he joined in 2013 from Cultural Luque. He was part of the club's U20 team at the 2018 U-20 Copa Libertadores, notably scoring one goal in three matches. He was moved into Talleres' first-team later that year under Juan Pablo Vojvoda, marking his professional debut with a twenty-two minute appearance at the end of a 1–1 draw with Vélez Sarsfield on 22 September. Four further appearances followed across 2018–19 and 2019–20.

On 17 January 2020, Valiente, alongside teammate Carlos Villalba, was loaned to Uruguayan Primera División club Rentistas until the end of the year. He made his debut in a win away to Boston River on 22 February, before scoring on his first home appearance against Deportivo Maldonado on 7 March.

In February 2021, Valiente joined Alvarado on loan for the rest of 2021. In January 2022, the loan-spell was extended with one more year.

== International career ==
Valiente was selected for Argentina U19 training in 2018.

== Personal life ==
In December 2020, it was revealed that Valiente had tested positive for COVID-19; amid the pandemic.

== Career statistics ==
As of 23 September 2022.

Club statistics
Club	Season	League			Cup		League Cup		Continental		Other		Total	
Club	Season	Division	Apps	Goals	Apps	Goals	Apps	Goals	Apps	Goals	Apps	Goals	Apps	Goals
Talleres	2018–19	Argentine Primera División	3	0	0	0	0	0	0	0	0	0	3	0
Talleres	2019–20	Argentine Primera División	2	0	0	0	0	0	0	0	0	0	2	0
Talleres	2020–21	Argentine Primera División	0	0	0	0	0	0	0	0	0	0	0	0
Talleres	Total		5	0	0	0	0	0	0	0	0	0	5	0
Rentistas (loan)	2020	Uruguayan Primera División	9	1	—		—		—		0	0	9	1
CA Alvarado (loan)	2021	Primera Nacional	26	2	—		—		—		0	0	26	2
CA Alvarado (loan)	2022	Primera Nacional	23	3	—		—		—		0	0	23	3
CA Alvarado (loan)	Total		49	5	0	0	0	0	0	0	0	0	49	5
Career total			63	6	0	0	0	0	0	0	0	0	63	6
