= Cristian Ramírez (Argentine footballer) =

Argentine footballer

Personal information
- Full name: Cristian Ezequiel Ramírez
- Date of birth: 29 March 1995 (age 31)
- Place of birth: Nicanor Otamendi, Argentina
- Height: 1.80 m (5 ft 11 in)
- Position: Midfielder

Team information
- Current team: Egaleo
- Number: 8

Youth career
- Lanús

Senior career*
Years	Team	Apps	(Gls)
2017–2019	Lanús	0	(0)
2017–2018	→ Talleres (loan)	2	(0)
2019–2022	Thesprotos	63	(10)
2022	AS Trenčín	4	(0)
2023–	Egaleo	11	(2)
- * Club domestic league appearances and goals as of 16 June 2023

Cristian Ezequiel Ramírez (born 29 March 1995) is an Argentine professional footballer who plays as a midfielder for Greek Super League 2 club Egaleo.

== Career ==
Ramírez began in the youth system of Argentine Primera División team Lanús, he was selected to represent the U20s at the 2016 U-20 Copa Libertadores in Paraguay; subsequently scoring three goals in five matches as Lanús finished fourth. On 20 July 2017, Ramírez joined fellow Primera División side Talleres on loan. His professional and Talleres debut came during a 5–2 victory over his parent club Lanús on 26 August. Ahead of the 2019–20 campaign, Ramírez switched Argentina for Greece after agreeing terms with Football League side Thesprotos. He scored four goals in twenty appearances in his first season.

== Career statistics ==
As of 7 July 2020.

Club statistics
Club	Season	League			Cup		League Cup		Continental		Other		Total	
Club	Season	Division	Apps	Goals	Apps	Goals	Apps	Goals	Apps	Goals	Apps	Goals	Apps	Goals
Lanús	2017–18	Primera División	0	0	0	0	—		0	0	0	0	0	0
Lanús	2018–19	Primera División	0	0	0	0	0	0	—		0	0	0	0
Lanús	Total		0	0	0	0	0	0	0	0	0	0	0	0
Talleres (loan)	2017–18	Primera División	2	0	0	0	—		—		0	0	2	0
Thesprotos	2019–20	Football League	20	4	0	0	—		—		0	0	20	4
Career total			22	4	0	0	—		0	0	0	0	22	4
