= Lautaro Guzmán =

Argentine footballer

Personal information
- Full name: Brian Lautaro Guzmán
- Date of birth: 18 January 2000 (age 26)
- Place of birth: Villa María, Argentina
- Height: 1.73 m (5 ft 8 in)
- Position: Forward

Team information
- Current team: Arsenal Sarandí

Youth career
- Roque Sáenz Peña
- Alumni
- 2013–2018: Talleres

Senior career*
Years	Team	Apps	(Gls)
2018–2023	Talleres	8	(0)
2021	→ Aldosivi (loan)	23	(1)
2022	→ Montevideo City (loan)	15	(1)
2023	→ Arsenal Sarandí (loan)	39	(2)
2024–	Arsenal Sarandí	6	(0)
2025	→ Melgar (loan)	30	(4)
- * Club domestic league appearances and goals as of 30 December 2025

Brian Lautaro Guzmán (born 18 January 2000) is an Argentine professional footballer who plays as a forward for Arsenal Sarandí.

== Career ==
Guzmán's youth career began with Roque Sáenz Peña, prior to joining the system of Alumni. In 2013, Talleres signed Gúzman. He featured for the club's U20 team at the 2018 U-20 Copa Libertadores in Uruguay, making appearances against Atlético Venezuela and São Paulo. Later that year, in October, Gúzman was moved into Talleres' first-team for an Argentine Primera División fixture with Defensa y Justicia, subsequently making his professional debut by coming on at half time in place of Junior Arias as they lost 2–0.

On 27 January 2021, Guzmán joined Aldosivi on loan for the rest of the season with a purchase option. He returned to Talleres at the end of the year. In February 2022, he was loaned out to Montevideo City for the 2022 season.

== Career statistics ==
As of 31 October 2018.

Club statistics
Club	Season	League			Cup (Note: Includes the Copa Argentina)		League Cup		Continental (Note: Includes the Copa Libertadores)		Total	
Club	Season	Division	Apps	Goals	Apps	Goals	Apps	Goals	Apps	Goals	Apps	Goals
Talleres	2018–19	Primera División	1	0	0	0	—		0	0	1	0
Career total			1	0	0	0	—		0	0	1	0

== Honours ==
Talleres

- Torneo de Reserva: 2017–18
