= Facundo Medina =

Argentine footballer (born 1999)

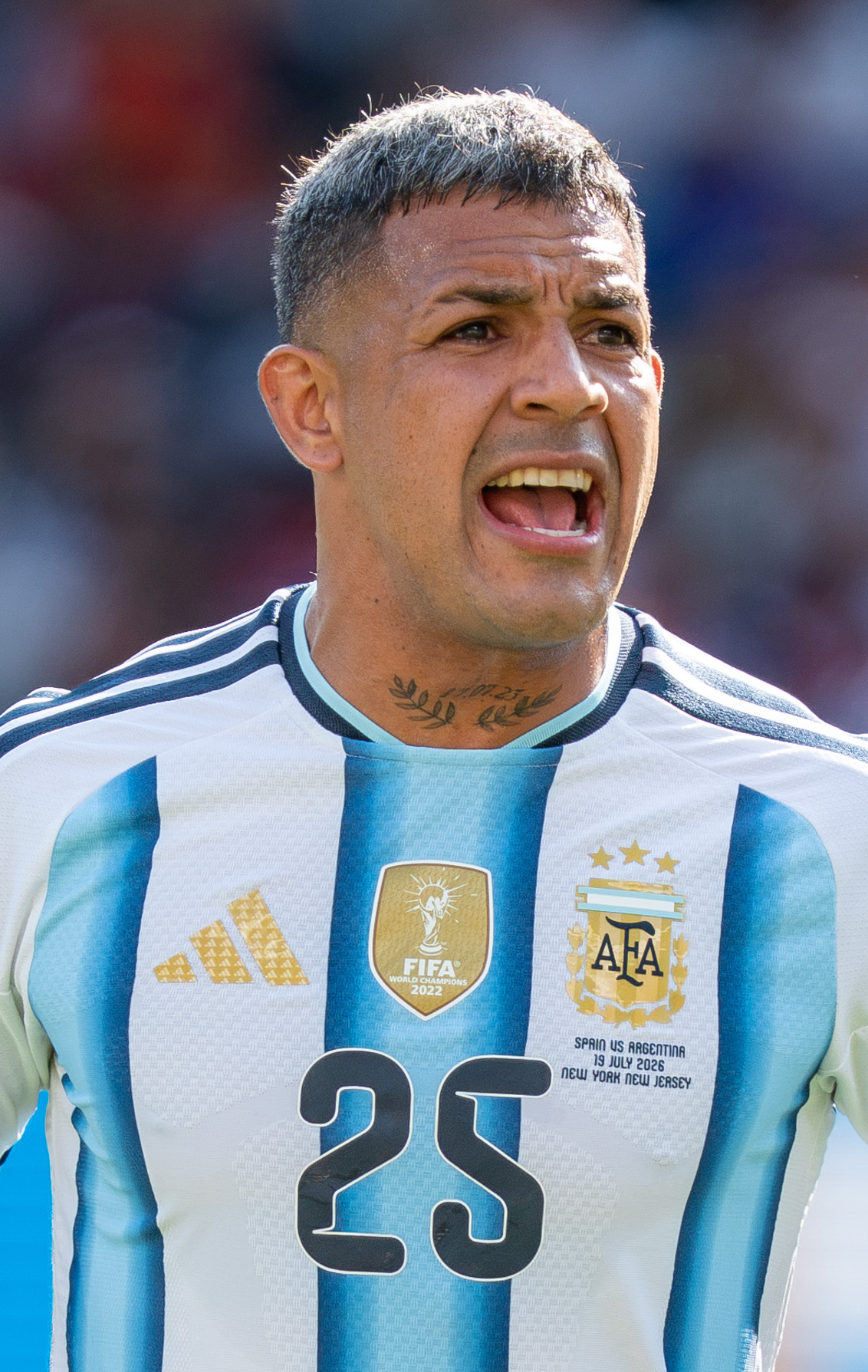
- Medina with Argentina in 2026

Personal information
- Full name: Facundo Axel Medina
- Date of birth: 28 May 1999 (age 27)
- Place of birth: Villa Fiorito, Argentina
- Height: 1.84 m (6 ft 0 in)
- Positions: Centre-back; left-back

Team information
- Current team: Bayer Leverkusen
- Number: 2

Youth career
- 2010–2018: River Plate
- 2018: Talleres

Senior career*
Years	Team	Apps	(Gls)
2018–2020	Talleres	33	(1)
2020–2026	Lens	147	(6)
2025–2026	→ Marseille (loan)	17	(0)
2026	Marseille	0	(0)
2026–	Bayer Leverkusen	8	(1)

International career^{‡}
2018–2019	Argentina U20	12	(0)
2019–2021	Argentina U23	17	(1)
2020–	Argentina	15	(0)
Medal record
Representing Argentina
Men's Football
FIFA World Cup
Runner-up	2026 Canada–Mexico–US
Pan American Games
Gold medal – first place	2019 Lima	Team
- * Club domestic league appearances and goals as of 17:30, 31 October 2026 (UTC) ‡ National team caps and goals as of 03:27, 4 October 2026 (UTC)

Facundo Axel Medina (born 28 May 1999) is an Argentine professional footballer who plays as a centre-back or left-back for Bundesliga club Bayer Leverkusen and the Argentina national team.

== Club career ==
Medina's career got underway with a stint with River Plate, for which he was an unused substitute four times during the 2016–17 Argentine Primera División season. In January 2018, Medina completed a move to fellow Argentine Primera División side Talleres. After featuring for their U20s at the 2018 U-20 Copa Libertadores in February, he made his first league appearances in August when he played in matches against Boca Juniors, Rosario Central and Gimnasia y Esgrima. He scored his first senior goal in February 2020 against Huracán.

=== Lens ===
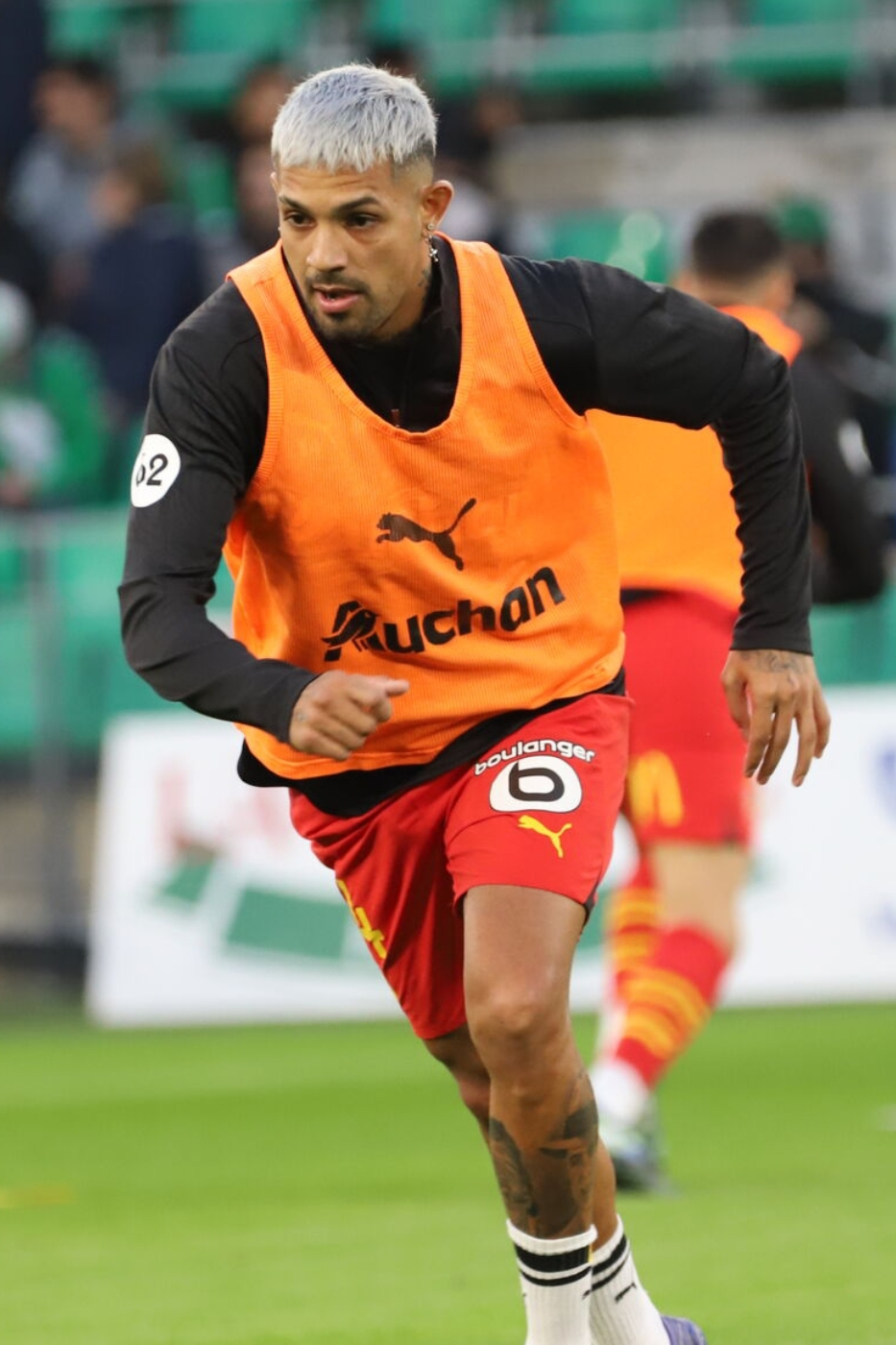
Medina training with Lens in 2025

After a total of 37 appearances for Talleres, Medina departed in July 2020 to join Ligue 1 side Lens. Medina netted his first goal for Lens on 13 September against Lorient, scoring with an overhead kick as his side won 3–2 away from home. He scored again on 3 February 2021 during a 2–2 draw at home to Marseille. His third Lens goal arrived on his Coupe de France starting debut in a defeat away to Championnat National club Red Star on 6 March.

On 18 January 2023, he extended his contract with Lens until 2026.

=== Marseille ===
On 2 July 2025, Medina signed for fellow Ligue 1 club Marseille on loan for the remainder of the 2025–26 season with an option to buy if agreed upon. By the conclusion of the 2025–26 season, he joined the club permanently for a transfer fee of €18m.

=== Bayer Leverkusen ===
On 11 August 2026, Medina signed a five-year contract with Bayer Leverkusen. The transfer fee was reportedly €25m including add-ons.

== International career ==
Medina with Argentina at the 2026 FIFA World Cup final

After playing in all three of Talleres' fixtures at the beginning of 2018–19, Medina received a call-up to the Argentina U20 squad. He subsequently featured on 29 August 2018 in a friendly with Uruguay. He had previous experience with the U20s during his time with River Plate, and was also called up to train against the senior squad during the 2018 FIFA World Cup in Russia. In December, Medina was selected for the 2019 South American U-20 Championship. He was also picked for the subsequent FIFA U-20 World Cup. He featured eleven times in the tournaments. Medina was called by the U23s for the 2019 Pan American Games.

Medina appeared in all five of Argentina's matches at the Pan American Games, as they came away with the trophy after defeating Honduras in the final. In September 2020, having won the 2020 CONMEBOL Pre-Olympic Tournament with the U23s months earlier, Medina received his first call-up to the Argentina senior squad from manager Lionel Scaloni. He debuted in a 2022 FIFA World Cup qualifying victory away to Bolivia on 13 October, after replacing Lautaro Martínez for the final moments at the Estadio Hernando Siles.

On 27 May 2026, Medina was selected in the 26-man squad for the 2026 FIFA World Cup.

== Career statistics ==
=== Club ===
As of match played 31 October 2026

Appearances and goals by club, season and competition
Club	Season	League			National cup		League cup		Continental		Other		Total	
Club	Season	Division	Apps	Goals	Apps	Goals	Apps	Goals	Apps	Goals	Apps	Goals	Apps	Goals
Talleres	2018–19	AFA Liga Profesional de Fútbol	16	0	1	0	0	0	0	0	0	0	17	0
Talleres	2019–20	AFA Liga Profesional de Fútbol	17	1	2	0	1	0	—		0	0	20	1
Talleres	Total		33	1	3	0	1	0	0	0	0	0	37	1
Lens	2020–21	Ligue 1	24	2	2	1	—		—		—		26	3
Lens	2021–22	Ligue 1	31	1	3	0	—		—		—		34	1
Lens	2022–23	Ligue 1	32	2	3	1	—		—		—		35	3
Lens	2023–24	Ligue 1	31	1	1	0	—		7 (Note: Six appearances in UEFA Champions League, one appearance in UEFA Europa League)	0	—		39	1
Lens	2024–25	Ligue 1	29	0	1	0	—		1 (Note: Appearance in UEFA Conference League)	0	—		31	0
Lens	Total		147	6	10	2	—		8	0	—		165	8
Marseille (loan)	2025–26	Ligue 1	17	0	4	0	—		4 (Note: Appearances in UEFA Champions League)	0	1 (Note: Appearance in Trophée des Champions)	0	26	0
Bayer Leverkusen	2026–27	Bundesliga	8	1	2	0	—		3 (Note: Appearances in UEFA Europa League)	1	—		13	2
Career total			205	8	19	2	1	0	15	1	1	0	241	11

=== International ===
As of match played 3 October 2026

Appearances and goals by national team and year
National team	Year	Apps	Goals
Argentina	2020	1	0
Argentina	2021	1	0
Argentina	2023	1	0
Argentina	2024	1	0
Argentina	2025	3	0
Argentina	2026	8	0
Total		15	0

== Honours ==
Argentina U23

- Pan American Games: 2019
- CONMEBOL Pre-Olympic Tournament: 2020

Argentina

- FIFA World Cup runner-up: 2026
