= Diego Valoyes =

Colombian footballer (born 1996)

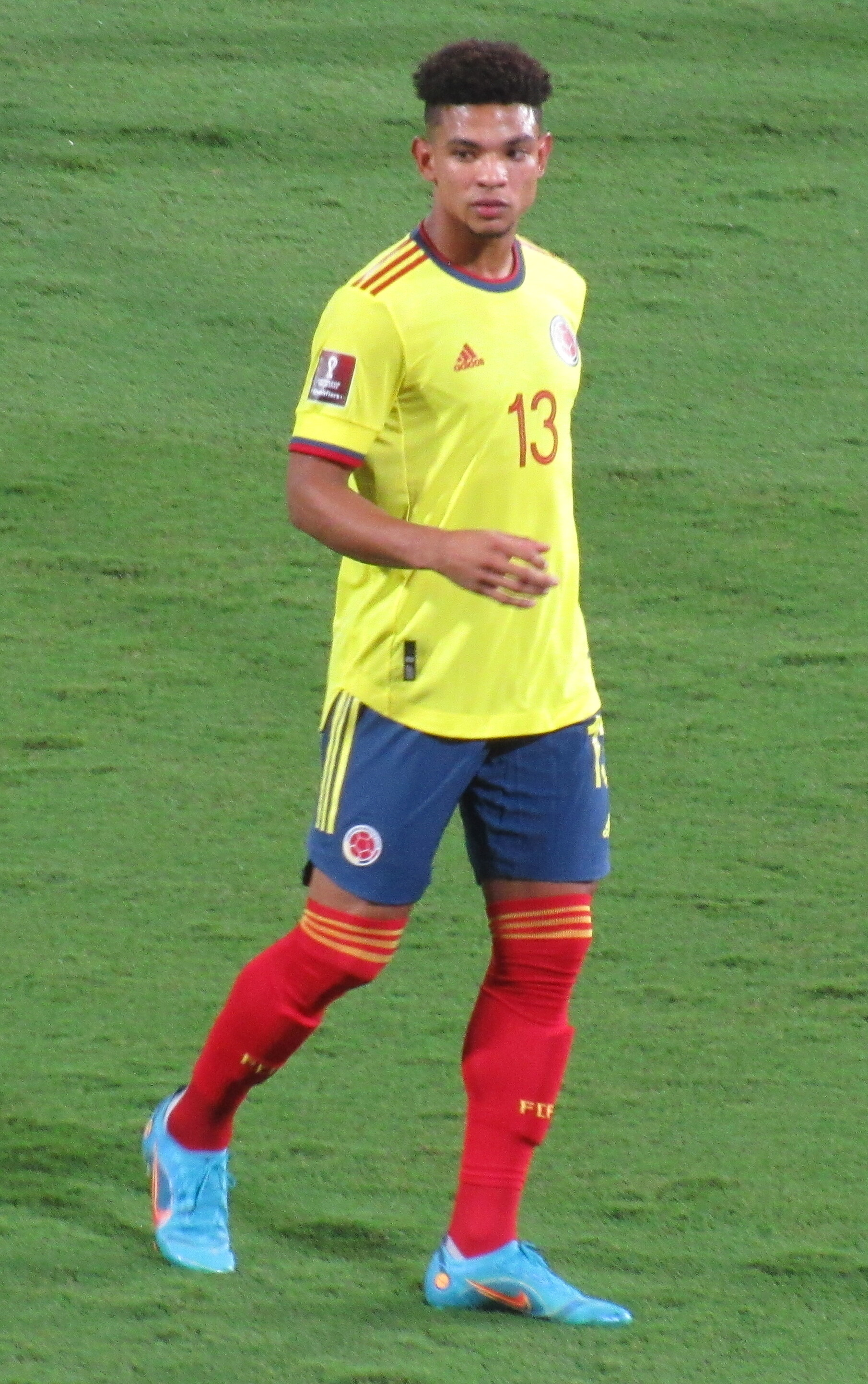
- Valoyes with Colombia in 2022

Personal information
- Full name: Diego Luis Valoyes Ruíz
- Date of birth: 22 September 1996 (age 30)
- Place of birth: Cartagena, Colombia
- Height: 1.82 m (5 ft 11 1/2 in)
- Position: Right winger

Team information
- Current team: Talleres (on loan from Juárez)
- Number: 7

Youth career
- Alianza Sport
- Fútbol Paz
- Los Calamares
- Real Cartagena
- 2013–2015: La Equidad

Senior career*
Years	Team	Apps	(Gls)
2015–2020	La Equidad	80	(6)
2018–2020	→ Talleres (loan)	23	(1)
2020–2023	Talleres	90	(22)
2023–	Juárez	22	(3)
2026–	→ Talleres (loan)	15	(0)

International career^{‡}
2021–	Colombia	6	(0)
- * Club domestic league appearances and goals as of 17:36, 15 November 2026 (UTC) ‡ National team caps and goals as of 14:18, 7 April 2023 (UTC)

Diego Luis Valoyes Ruíz (born 22 September 1996) is a Colombian professional footballer who plays as a right winger for Talleres, on loan from Liga MX club Juárez.

== Club career ==
Valoyes began his senior career with La Equidad, after youth spells with Alianza Sport, Fútbol Paz, Los Calamares and Real Cartagena. He made his debut against Categoría Primera B's Tigres in the Copa Colombia in March 2015, prior to featuring in pro league football for the first time on 4 September versus Deportivo Pasto. Almost a year later, in 2016, Valoyes scored his first goal against the same opponents during a 4–0 victory at the Estadio Metropolitano de Techo. In the following campaign of 2017, he netted five times as the club placed eleventh overall. Valoyes left on 28 June 2018 to join Talleres of the Argentine Primera División on loan.

The centre-forward featured fifteen times in all competitions for Talleres in 2018–19, prior to departing back to Colombia on 30 June. However, on 4 July, Talleres resigned Valoyes on loan.

== International career ==
He made his debut for Colombia national football team on 16 November 2021 in a World Cup qualifier against Paraguay.

== Career statistics ==
As of 21 September 2018

Club statistics
Club	Season	League			National cup		League cup		Continental		Other		Total	
Club	Season	Division	Apps	Goals	Apps	Goals	Apps	Goals	Apps	Goals	Apps	Goals	Apps	Goals
La Equidad	2015	Categoría Primera A	5	0	1	0	—		—		0	0	6	0
La Equidad	2016	Categoría Primera A	20	1	6	0	—		—		0	0	26	1
La Equidad	2017	Categoría Primera A	36	5	4	0	—		—		2 (Note: Appearances in Categoría Primera A play-offs)	0	42	5
La Equidad	2018	Categoría Primera A	18	0	2	0	—		—		0	0	20	0
La Equidad	2019	Categoría Primera A	0	0	0	0	—		0	0	0	0	0	0
La Equidad	Total		79	6	13	0	—		0	0	2	0	94	6
Talleres (loan)	2018–19	Primera División	9	0	1	0	3	0	2 (Note: Appearances in Copa Libertadores)	0	0	0	15	0
Talleres (loan)	2019–20	Primera División	0	0	0	0	0	0	—		0	0	0	0
Talleres (loan)	Total		9	0	1	0	3	0	2	0	2	0	15	0
Career total			88	6	14	0	3	0	2	0	2	0	109	6
