= Nicolás Giménez (footballer, born 1996) =

Emirati footballer (born 1996)

Nicolás Giménez نيكولاس خيمينيز
Personal information
- Full name: Nicolás Ezequiel Giménez
- Date of birth: 16 January 1996 (age 30)
- Place of birth: San Justo, Argentina
- Height: 1.78 m (5 ft 10 in)
- Position: Attacking midfielder

Team information
- Current team: Al Wasl
- Number: 31

Senior career*
Years	Team	Apps	(Gls)
2015–2016	Nueva Chicago	34	(11)
2016–2021	Talleres	30	(1)
2018–2019	→ San Martín (loan)	17	(2)
2019–2020	→ Arsenal de Sarandí (loan)	22	(7)
2020–2021	→ Baniyas (loan)	24	(8)
2021–2023	Baniyas	50	(15)
2023–	Al Wasl	57	(11)

International career^{‡}
2025–	United Arab Emirates	18	(4)
- * Club domestic league appearances and goals as of 19:41, 11 December 2023 (UTC) ‡ National team caps and goals as of 16:23, 17 November 2026 (UTC)

Nicolás Ezequiel Giménez (born 16 January 1996) is a professional footballer who plays as an attacking midfielder for UAE Pro League club Al Wasl. Born in Argentina, he plays for the United Arab Emirates national team.

== Club career ==
Giménez's career started with Nueva Chicago. He was promoted into their first-team in March 2015, when he made his professional debut in a 2–1 loss away from home against Gimnasia y Esgrima. It occurred during the 2015 Primera División season, which included three goals in fourteen appearances as Nueva Chicago were relegated. In Primera B Nacional, Giménez netted eight goals in twenty-one matches to help the club finish seventh. On 5 July 2016, newly promoted Primera División team Talleres signed Giménez. He scored his first goal in November 2017 versus Arsenal de Sarandí.

July 2018 saw Giménez depart on loan to Primera División team San Martín. Two goals, against Banfield and Huracán, across twenty-two appearances followed as the club suffered relegation. Giménez remained in the top-flight for 2019–20 after signing temporary terms with Arsenal de Sarandí. He netted goals against Godoy Cruz, Unión Santa Fe, Racing Club, River Plate, Lanús, Patronato and Aldosivi in the curtailed, due to the COVID-19 pandemic, campaign. In July 2020, Giménez was loaned to the United Arab Emirates with Pro League outfit Baniyas; penning a contract until mid-2021.

Giménez, after a friendly goal against Al Ain, scored three goals in his first three competitive games for Baniyas, as a debut goal versus Al-Wasl was followed by strikes in victories over Fujairah and Khor Fakkan. He went goalless across his next two appearances, before scoring in a League Cup first round encounter with Hatta on 12 November. After then going twelve matches without a goal, Giménez netted twice in a 3–3 draw away to Al Jazira on 18 February.

== International career ==
On 6 October 2023, Giménez acquired Emirati citizenship which qualified him to play for United Arab Emirates national team.

=== International goals ===
Scores and results list UAE goal tally first.

No	Date	Venue	Opponent	Score	Result	Competition
1.	9 December 2025	Stadium 974, Doha, Qatar	Kuwait	3–1	3–1	2025 FIFA Arab Cup
2.	24 September 2026	King Abdullah Sports City Stadium, Jeddah, Saudi Arabia	Yemen	1–0	4–0	27th Arabian Gulf Cup
3.	24 September 2026	King Abdullah Sports City Stadium, Jeddah, Saudi Arabia	Yemen	4–0	4–0	27th Arabian Gulf Cup
4.	17 November 2026	Hazza bin Zayed Stadium, Al Ain, United Arab Emirates	Syria	3–1	4–2	Friendly

== Career statistics ==
As of match played 17 February 2024

Club statistics
Club	Season	League			National cup (Note: Includes Copa Argentina, UAE President's Cup)		League cup (Note: Includes Copa de la Superliga, UAE League Cup)		Continental		Total	
Club	Season	Division	Apps	Goals	Apps	Goals	Apps	Goals	Apps	Goals	Apps	Goals
Nueva Chicago	2015	Argentine Primera División	13	3	1	0	—		—		14	3
Nueva Chicago	2016	Primera B Nacional	21	8	0	0	—		—		21	8
Nueva Chicago	Total		34	11	1	0	—		—		35	11
Talleres	2016–17	Argentine Primera División	16	0	0	0	—		—		16	0
Talleres	2017–18	Argentine Primera División	14	1	1	0	—		—		15	1
Talleres	2018–19	Argentine Primera División	0	0	0	0	—		0	0	0	0
Talleres	Total		30	1	1	0	—		0	0	31	1
San Martín (loan)	2018–19	Argentine Primera División	17	2	3	0	2	0	—		22	2
Arsenal de Sarandí (loan)	2019–20	Argentine Primera División	22	7	1	0	1	0	—		24	7
Baniyas	2020–21	UAE Pro League	24	8	0	0	4	1	—		28	9
Baniyas	2021–22	UAE Pro League	24	8	0	0	4	0	1 (Note: Appearance in AFC Champions League)	0	29	8
Baniyas	2022–23	UAE Pro League	26	7	3	2	2	0	0	0	31	9
Baniyas	Total		74	23	3	2	10	1	1	0	88	26
Al Wasl	2023–24	UAE Pro League	13	3	1	1	5	2	—		19	6
Career total			194	48	10	3	18	3	1	0	223	54
