= Santiago Moyano =

Argentine footballer

Personal information
- Full name: Antoliano Santiago Moyano
- Date of birth: 23 September 1997 (age 29)
- Place of birth: Villa del Totoral, Argentina
- Position: Midfielder

Team information
- Current team: Central Córdoba SdE
- Number: 33

Senior career*
| Years | Team | Apps | (Gls) |
- Juventud Sportiva Totoral
- Deportivo Colón
| 2014–2023 | Talleres | 0 | (0) |
| 2018–2019 | → Instituto (loan) | 3 | (0) |
| 2019–2021 | → Villa Dálmine (loan) | 35 | (0) |
| 2022 | → Deportivo Maipú (loan) | 30 | (2) |
| 2023–2026 | Deportivo Maipú | 70 | (3) |
| 2025 | → Central Córdoba SdE (loan) | 21 | (0) |
| 2026– | Central Córdoba SdE | 27 | (0) |
- * Club domestic league appearances and goals as of 16:23, 9 May 2026 (UTC)

Antoliano Santiago Moyano (born 23 September 1997) is an Argentine professional footballer who plays as a midfielder for Central Córdoba SdE.

== Career ==
Moyano made his bow in senior football aged fifteen with Juventud Sportiva Totoral in Liga Colón, a competition he also featured for Deportivo Colón in. 2014 saw Moyano move to Talleres, initially featuring for their academy before being an unused substitute on one occasion in both the 2016–17 and 2017–18 seasons in the Primera División. On 26 June 2018, Moyano was loaned to Primera B Nacional's Instituto. He made his professional bow during a 3–0 loss to Villa Dálmine in August.

== Career statistics ==
As of 8 February 2019.

Club statistics
| Club | Season | League | | | Cup | | Continental | | Other | | Total | |
| Club | Season | Division | Apps | Goals | Apps | Goals | Apps | Goals | Apps | Goals | Apps | Goals |
|---|---|---|---|---|---|---|---|---|---|---|---|---|
| Talleres | 2014 | Torneo Federal A | 0 | 0 | 0 | 0 | — | | 0 | 0 | 0 | 0 |
| Talleres | 2015 | Torneo Federal A | 0 | 0 | 0 | 0 | — | | 0 | 0 | 0 | 0 |
| Talleres | 2016 | Primera B Nacional | 0 | 0 | 0 | 0 | — | | 0 | 0 | 0 | 0 |
| Talleres | 2016–17 | Primera División | 0 | 0 | 0 | 0 | — | | 0 | 0 | 0 | 0 |
| Talleres | 2017–18 | Primera División | 0 | 0 | 0 | 0 | — | | 0 | 0 | 0 | 0 |
| Talleres | 2018–19 | Primera División | 0 | 0 | 0 | 0 | 0 | 0 | 0 | 0 | 0 | 0 |
| Talleres | Career total | | 0 | 0 | 0 | 0 | 0 | 0 | 0 | 0 | 0 | 0 |
| Instituto (loan) | 2018–19 | Primera B Nacional | 3 | 0 | 0 | 0 | — | | 0 | 0 | 3 | 0 |
| Career total | | | 3 | 0 | 0 | 0 | 0 | 0 | 0 | 0 | 3 | 0 |
