= Leonel Rivas =

Argentine footballer

Personal information
- Date of birth: 4 December 1999 (age 26)
- Place of birth: Rosario, Argentina
- Height: 1.73 m (5 ft 8 in)
- Position: Attacking midfielder

Team information
- Current team: Tilikratis
- Number: 80

Senior career*
Years	Team	Apps	(Gls)
2017–2021	Rosario Central	11	(0)
2019	→ Talleres (loan)	2	(0)
2021–2023	Almopos Aridea	38	(5)
2023–	Tilikratis	0	(0)
- * Club domestic league appearances and goals as of 14 September 2023

Leonel Rivas (born 4 December 1999) is an Argentine professional footballer who plays as an attacking midfielder for Greek Super League 2 club Tilikratis.
