= Fernando Bersano =

Argentine footballer (born 1998)

Personal information
- Full name: Fernando Luis Bersano
- Date of birth: 3 January 1998 (age 28)
- Place of birth: Arroyito, Argentina
- Height: 1.63 m (5 ft 4 in)
- Position: Left-back

Team information
- Current team: Estudiantes RC
- Number: 3

Youth career
- Deportivo y Cultural Arroyito
- Talleres

Senior career*
Years	Team	Apps	(Gls)
2016–2024	Talleres	8	(0)
2021	→ Villa Dálmine (loan)	27	(6)
2022	→ Deportivo Morón (loan)	14	(0)
2022–2023	→ Gimnasia Mendoza (loan)	38	(2)
2024–2026	ADT	42	(3)
2026–	Estudiantes RC	1	(0)
- * Club domestic league appearances and goals as of 17:12, 11 May 2026 (UTC)

Fernando Luis Bersano (born 3 January 1998) is an Argentine professional footballer who plays as a left-back for Estudiantes RC.

== Career ==
Bersano began his career with Deportivo y Cultural Arroyito, who preceded his move to Talleres. He was promoted into the Primera División club's first-team squad midway through the 2018–19 season, though he had signed his first pro contract back in November 2016. Having impressed in mid-season friendlies in January 2019, the defender signed a new two-year contract on 24 January. He made his professional debut under manager Juan Pablo Vojvoda on 27 January during an away draw to Independiente; he featured for the full duration.

In February 2021, Bersano was sent out on loan to Primera Nacional club Villa Dálmine until the end of the year. After returning in January 2022, he was sent out on loan again, this time to Deportivo Morón, until the end of 2022. However, the spell at Morón was terminated before time, and joined Gimnasia Mendoza on 23 June 2022, on a one-year loan.

== Career statistics ==
As of 27 January 2019.

Club statistics
Club	Season	League			Cup		Continental		Other		Total	
Club	Season	Division	Apps	Goals	Apps	Goals	Apps	Goals	Apps	Goals	Apps	Goals
Talleres	2016–17	Primera División	0	0	0	0	—		0	0	0	0
Talleres	2017–18	Primera División	0	0	0	0	—		0	0	0	0
Talleres	2018–19	Primera División	1	0	0	0	0	0	0	0	1	0
Career total			1	0	0	0	0	0	0	0	1	0
