= Ian Escobar =

Argentine footballer

Personal information
- Full name: Ian Eduardo Escobar Ibáñez
- Date of birth: 29 May 1996 (age 30)
- Place of birth: Moreno, Argentina
- Height: 1.73 m (5 ft 8 in)
- Position: Left-back

Team information
- Current team: Patronato

Senior career*
Years	Team	Apps	(Gls)
2015–2016	Chacarita Juniors	30	(0)
2016–2023	Talleres	26	(0)
2019–2020	→ San Martín SJ (loan)	25	(1)
2020–2021	→ Godoy Cruz (loan)	23	(1)
2022	→ Banfield (loan)	7	(0)
2022–2023	→ Aldosivi (loan)	43	(2)
2024	San Miguel	23	(0)
2025–	Patronato	10	(0)
- * Club domestic league appearances and goals as of 17:26, 22 June 2025 (UTC)

Ian Eduardo Escobar Ibáñez (born 29 May 1996) is an Argentine professional footballer who plays as a left-back for Patronato.

== Career ==
Escobar's first club was Chacarita Juniors, he began playing for the Primera B Nacional club's senior team during the 2015 season. He made his professional debut in August 2015 in a 1–0 loss to Guillermo Brown, which was the first of thirty appearances in two campaigns with Chacarita Juniors. In July 2016, Escobar was signed by newly promoted Argentine Primera División side Talleres. His first appearance arrived on 25 September versus Banfield at the Estadio Mario Alberto Kempes. On 14 January 2019, Escobar joined San Martín on loan. After breaking contract with San Martin before the start of the Primera Nacional 2020, Escobar joined Godoy Cruz on 2 November 2020.

On 3 January 2022, Escobar joined Banfield on a one-year loan with a purchase option. However, he didn't play as much as expected, why it was confirmed on 14 July 2022, that the spell had been terminated and that Escobar instead had joined fellow league club, Aldosivi, on a loan until the end of 2023 with a purchase option. In his fourth appearance for Aldosivi, Escobar collided with Lanús player Iván Cazal's head, and was brought to the hospital with an ambulance.

== Career statistics ==
As of 15 January 2019.

Club statistics
Club	Season	League			Cup		Continental		Other		Total	
Club	Season	Division	Apps	Goals	Apps	Goals	Apps	Goals	Apps	Goals	Apps	Goals
Chacarita Juniors	2015	Primera B Nacional	12	0	0	0	—		0	0	12	0
Chacarita Juniors	2016	Primera B Nacional	18	0	0	0	—		0	0	18	0
Chacarita Juniors	Total		30	0	0	0	—		0	0	30	0
Talleres	2016–17	Primera División	22	0	0	0	—		0	0	22	0
Talleres	2017–18	Primera División	3	0	1	0	—		0	0	4	0
Talleres	2018–19	Primera División	1	0	1	0	0	0	0	0	2	0
Talleres	Total		26	0	2	0	0	0	0	0	28	0
San Martín (loan)	2018–19	Primera División	0	0	0	0	—		0	0	0	0
San Martín (loan)	2019–20	Primera Nacional	0	0	0	0	—		0	0	0	0
San Martín (loan)	Total		0	0	0	0	0	0	0	0	0	0
Godoy Cruz (loan)	2020	Copa de la Liga Profesional	0	0	0	0	—		0	0	0	0
Godoy Cruz (loan)	Total		0	0	0	0	0	0	0	0	0	0
Career total			56	0	2	0	0	0	0	0	58	0
