= Alejandro Maciel =

Argentine footballer

Personal information
- Full name: Alejandro Ramón Maciel
- Date of birth: 22 April 1997 (age 29)
- Place of birth: El Porvenir, Argentina
- Height: 1.83 m (6 ft 0 in)
- Position: Centre-back

Team information
- Current team: Central Córdoba SdE (on loan from Olimpia)
- Number: 2

Youth career
- Sportivo Eldorado
- Boca Juniors
- 2016–2018: → Talleres (loan)

Senior career*
Years	Team	Apps	(Gls)
2018–2023	Talleres	0	(0)
2018–2019	→ Santamarina (loan)	4	(0)
2019–2020	→ Villa Dálmine (loan)	21	(1)
2020–2021	→ Central Córdoba SdE (loan)	27	(0)
2022	→ Banfield (loan)	33	(0)
2023–2025	Banfield	66	(1)
2025–	Olimpia	4	(1)
2025	→ Nacional (loan)	10	(0)
2026–	→ Central Córdoba SdE (loan)	28	(1)
- * Club domestic league appearances and goals as of 17:16, 12 November 2026 (UTC)

Alejandro Ramón Maciel (born 22 April 1997) is an Argentine professional footballer who plays as a centre-back for Central Córdoba SdE, on loan from Olimpia.

== Career ==
Maciel began with Sportivo Eldorado, before joining Boca Juniors. In August 2016, Maciel joined Talleres' academy on loan. The deal was made permanent in January 2018, with Maciel joining as part of the transfer that took Emanuel Reynoso to Boca Juniors. He was promoted into Talleres' senior squad from December 2017, being an unused substitute for fixtures with Colón, Defensa y Justicia and Gimnasia y Esgrima in the 2017–18 Primera División campaign. On 22 June 2018, Maciel was loaned to Primera B Nacional's Santamarina. After an ankle injury, his pro bow came in March 2019 versus Almagro.

Maciel spent the 2019–20 campaign on loan with Villa Dálmine, scoring once in twenty-one appearances.

After a loan spell at Central Córdoba SdE from October 2020 until the end of 2021, Maciel signed a one-year loan deal with Banfield.

== Career statistics ==
As of 26 June 2020.

Appearances and goals by club, season and competition
Club	Season	League			Cup		Continental		Other		Total	
Club	Season	Division	Apps	Goals	Apps	Goals	Apps	Goals	Apps	Goals	Apps	Goals
Talleres	2017–18	Primera División	0	0	0	0	—		0	0	0	0
Talleres	2018–19	Primera División	0	0	0	0	0	0	0	0	0	0
Talleres	Total		0	0	0	0	0	0	0	0	0	0
Santamarina (loan)	2018–19	Primera B Nacional	4	0	0	0	—		0	0	4	0
Villa Dálmine (loan)	2019–20	Primera B Nacional	21	1	0	0	—		0	0	21	1
Career total			25	1	0	0	0	0	0	0	25	1
