= Franco Malagueño =

Argentine footballer

Personal information
- Date of birth: 10 October 1998 (age 28)
- Place of birth: Córdoba, Argentina
- Height: 1.67 m (5 ft 6 in)
- Position: Right-back

Team information
- Current team: Colegiales

Youth career
- Talleres

Senior career*
Years	Team	Apps	(Gls)
2017–2020	Talleres	1	(0)
2020–2023	Alvarado	59	(1)
2023	Gimnasia Jujuy	4	(0)
2023–2025	Alvarado	35	(1)
2025–	Colegiales	28	(1)
- * Club domestic league appearances and goals as of 17:18, 25 April 2026 (UTC)

Franco Malagueño (born 10 October 1998) is an Argentine professional footballer who plays as a right-back for Colegiales.

== Career ==
Malagueño started out with Talleres. Frank Darío Kudelka was the manager who promoted Malagueño into the club's senior team, with his opening inclusion in a matchday squad occurring on 26 August 2017 during a 5–2 victory over Lanús. He was an unused substitute for that fixture, as he was a further eight times in the 2017–18 Primera División; midway through that season, Malagueño played for Talleres at the 2018 U-20 Copa Libertadores. His professional bow eventually arrived in February 2019, when the defender featured for the full ninety minutes of a draw away to Atlético Tucumán.

== Career statistics ==
As of 10 February 2019.

Club statistics
Club	Season	League			Cup		Continental		Other		Total	
Club	Season	Division	Apps	Goals	Apps	Goals	Apps	Goals	Apps	Goals	Apps	Goals
Talleres	2017–18	Primera División	0	0	0	0	—		0	0	0	0
Talleres	2018–19	Primera División	1	0	0	0	0	0	0	0	1	0
Career total			1	0	0	0	0	0	0	0	1	0
