= Ezequiel Mastrolía =

Argentine footballer

Personal information
- Full name: Ezequiel Gastón Mastrolía
- Date of birth: 25 March 1991 (age 35)
- Place of birth: Buenos Aires, Argentina
- Height: 1.82 m (5 ft 11 1/2 in)
- Position: Goalkeeper

Team information
- Current team: Temperley

Senior career*
Years	Team	Apps	(Gls)
2010–2014	San Lorenzo	0	(0)
2014	Comunicaciones	10	(0)
2015–2017	Platense	76	(0)
2017–2019	Talleres	0	(0)
2017–2018	→ Mitre (loan)	15	(0)
2020	Estudiantes	0	(0)
2021	All Boys	34	(0)
2022–2023	Cúcuta Deportivo	56	(0)
2024	Once Caldas	5	(0)
2025–	Temperley	43	(0)
- * Club domestic league appearances and goals as of 17:38, 20 April 2026 (UTC)

Ezequiel Gastón Mastrolía (born 25 March 1991) is an Argentine professional footballer who plays as a goalkeeper for Temperley.

== Career ==
Mastrolía began his career with San Lorenzo. He made his debut for the club in a Copa Argentina victory over Villa Dálmine in November 2011. Mastrolía remained with San Lorenzo for three further years but never appeared in the league; though was an unused substitute twenty-seven times. July 2014 saw Mastrolía join Comunicaciones of Primera B Metropolitana, whom he would make ten appearances for during the 2014 season. On 1 January 2015, Mastrolía completed a move to fellow third tier outfit Platense. His first appearance arrived on 17 February against Almirante Brown, the first of twenty-seven in his opening campaign.

In July 2017, Mastrolía joined Argentine Primera División side Talleres but was soon loaned out to Mitre in Primera B Nacional. He featured on fifteen occasions during 2017–18 as Mitre finished thirteenth. Mastrolía was released at the end of 2019 by Talleres, with the goalkeeper subsequently joining Estudiantes in July 2020.

== Career statistics ==
As of 17 July 2020.

Club statistics
Club	Season	League			Cup		League Cup		Continental		Other		Total	
Club	Season	Division	Apps	Goals	Apps	Goals	Apps	Goals	Apps	Goals	Apps	Goals	Apps	Goals
San Lorenzo	2010–11	Primera División	0	0	0	0	—		—		0	0	0	0
San Lorenzo	2011–12	Primera División	0	0	1	0	—		—		0	0	1	0
San Lorenzo	2012–13	Primera División	0	0	0	0	—		—		0	0	0	0
San Lorenzo	2013–14	Primera División	0	0	0	0	—		0	0	0	0	0	0
San Lorenzo	Total		0	0	1	0	—		0	0	0	0	1	0
Comunicaciones	2014	Primera B Metropolitana	10	0	0	0	—		—		0	0	10	0
Platense	2015	Primera B Metropolitana	27	0	0	0	—		—		0	0	27	0
Platense	2016	Primera B Metropolitana	16	0	0	0	—		—		0	0	16	0
Platense	2016–17	Primera B Metropolitana	33	0	0	0	—		—		1 (Note: One appearance in 2016–17 Primera B Metropolitana play-offs)	0	34	0
Platense	Total		76	0	0	0	—		—		1	0	77	0
Talleres	2017–18	Primera División	0	0	0	0	—		—		0	0	0	0
Talleres	2018–19	Primera División	0	0	0	0	0	0	0	0	0	0	0	0
Talleres	2019–20	Primera División	0	0	0	0	0	0	—		0	0	0	0
Talleres	Total		0	0	0	0	0	0	0	0	0	0	0	0
Mitre (loan)	2017–18	Primera B Nacional	15	0	1	0	—		—		0	0	16	0
Estudiantes	2020	Primera B Nacional	0	0	0	0	—		—		0	0	0	0
Career total			101	0	2	0	0	0	0	0	1	0	104	0
