= Ignacio Méndez =

Argentine footballer

Personal information
- Full name: Juan Ignacio Méndez Aveiro
- Date of birth: 28 April 1997 (age 29)
- Place of birth: Luján de Cuyo, Argentina
- Height: 1.78 m (5 ft 10 in)
- Position: Midfielder

Team information
- Current team: Instituto (on loan from Newell's Old Boys)
- Number: 13

Youth career
- 2005–2012: Andes Talleres
- 2012–2017: Argentinos Juniors

Senior career*
| Years | Team | Apps | (Gls) |
| 2017–2019 | Argentinos Juniors | 12 | (0) |
| 2019–2022 | Talleres | 49 | (3) |
| 2022–2023 | San Lorenzo | 19 | (1) |
| 2023–2024 | Vélez Sarsfield | 16 | (0) |
| 2024– | Newell's Old Boys | 18 | (0) |
| 2025– | → Instituto (loan) | 23 | (0) |
- * Club domestic league appearances and goals as of 18:09, 10 May 2026 (UTC)

Juan Ignacio Méndez Aveiro (born 28 April 1997) is an Argentine professional footballer who plays as a midfielder for Instituto, on loan from Newell's Old Boys.

== Career ==
=== Club ===
Méndez began in the youth system of Andes Talleres in 2005, where he spent seven years, trialling at Boca Juniors in 2009, before joining the ranks of Argentinos Juniors in 2012. He first appeared in the Argentinos first-team on 8 July 2017 for a Primera B Nacional match with Gimnasia y Esgrima, but he was an unused substitute. On 12 July, Méndez made his professional debut in the same competition versus Nueva Chicago. Another appearance followed in 2016–17 as Argentinos won the title and therefore promotion to the 2017–18 Primera División. In January 2019, Méndez joined Talleres, as part of a deal involving Carlos Quintana.

On 8 July 2022, Méndez joined San Lorenzo, signing a 1.5 years contract. In December, he started attracting attention from Liga MX clubs and other Argentinian clubs, eventually joining Vélez Sarsfield on a free transfer and signing a two-year contract.

On 9 July 2024, Méndez joined Newell's Old Boys, signing a 3.5 years contract. On 31 July 2025, he joined Instituto on a 1.5 year loan, with an option to join them permanently for a reported fee of $900 thousand.

=== International ===
Méndez was called up to Argentina's squad for the 2017 FIFA U-20 World Cup in South Korea as an injury replacement for Ezequiel Barco. However, he failed to feature in a match as Argentina were eliminated at the group stage.

== Personal life ==
From his grandmother, he is of Chilean descent.

== Career statistics ==
As of 12 March 2026.

Appearances and goals by club, season and competition
| Club | Season | League | | | Cup | | Continental (Note: Includes Copa Sudamericana and Copa Libertadores) | | Other (Note: Includes Copa de la Liga Profesional) | | Total | |
| Club | Season | Division | Apps | Goals | Apps | Goals | Apps | Goals | Apps | Goals | Apps | Goals |
|---|---|---|---|---|---|---|---|---|---|---|---|---|
| Argentinos Juniors | 2016–17 | Primera B Nacional | 2 | 0 | 0 | 0 | — | | — | | 2 | 0 |
| Argentinos Juniors | 2017–18 | Primera División | 0 | 0 | 0 | 0 | — | | — | | 0 | 0 |
| Argentinos Juniors | 2018–19 | Primera División | 10 | 0 | 2 | 0 | — | | — | | 12 | 0 |
| Argentinos Juniors | Total | | 12 | 0 | 2 | 0 | — | | — | | 14 | 0 |
| Talleres | 2019–20 | Primera División | 15 | 2 | 1 | 0 | — | | — | | 16 | 2 |
| Talleres | 2020–21 | Primera División | 10 | 1 | 6 | 0 | 6 | 0 | 13 | 0 | 35 | 1 |
| Talleres | 2021 | Primera División | 24 | 0 | 0 | 0 | 5 | 0 | 8 | 1 | 37 | 1 |
| Talleres | Total | | 49 | 3 | 7 | 0 | 11 | 0 | 21 | 1 | 72 | 4 |
| San Lorenzo | 2022 | Primera División | 19 | 1 | 0 | 0 | — | | — | | 19 | 1 |
| Vélez Sarsfield | 2023 | Primera División | 13 | 0 | 0 | 0 | — | | 14 | 1 | 27 | 1 |
| Vélez Sarsfield | 2024 | Primera División | 3 | 0 | 1 | 0 | — | | 8 | 0 | 12 | 0 |
| Vélez Sarsfield | Total | | 16 | 0 | 1 | 0 | — | | 22 | 1 | 39 | 1 |
| Newell's | 2024 | Primera División | 12 | 0 | 1 | 0 | — | | — | | 13 | 0 |
| Newell's | 2025 | Primera División | 6 | 0 | 0 | 0 | — | | — | | 6 | 0 |
| Newell's | Total | | 18 | 0 | 1 | 0 | — | | — | | 19 | 0 |
| Instituto | 2025 | Primera División | 9 | 0 | 0 | 0 | — | | — | | 9 | 0 |
| Instituto | 2026 | Primera División | 8 | 0 | 0 | 0 | — | | — | | 8 | 0 |
| Instituto | Total | | 17 | 0 | 0 | 0 | — | | — | | 17 | 0 |
| Career total | | | 131 | 4 | 11 | 0 | 11 | 0 | 43 | 2 | 196 | 6 |

== Honours ==
Argentinos Juniors

- Primera B Nacional: 2016–17

=== Vélez Sarsfield ===
- Primera División Argentina: 2024
