= Jonathan Menéndez =

Argentine footballer

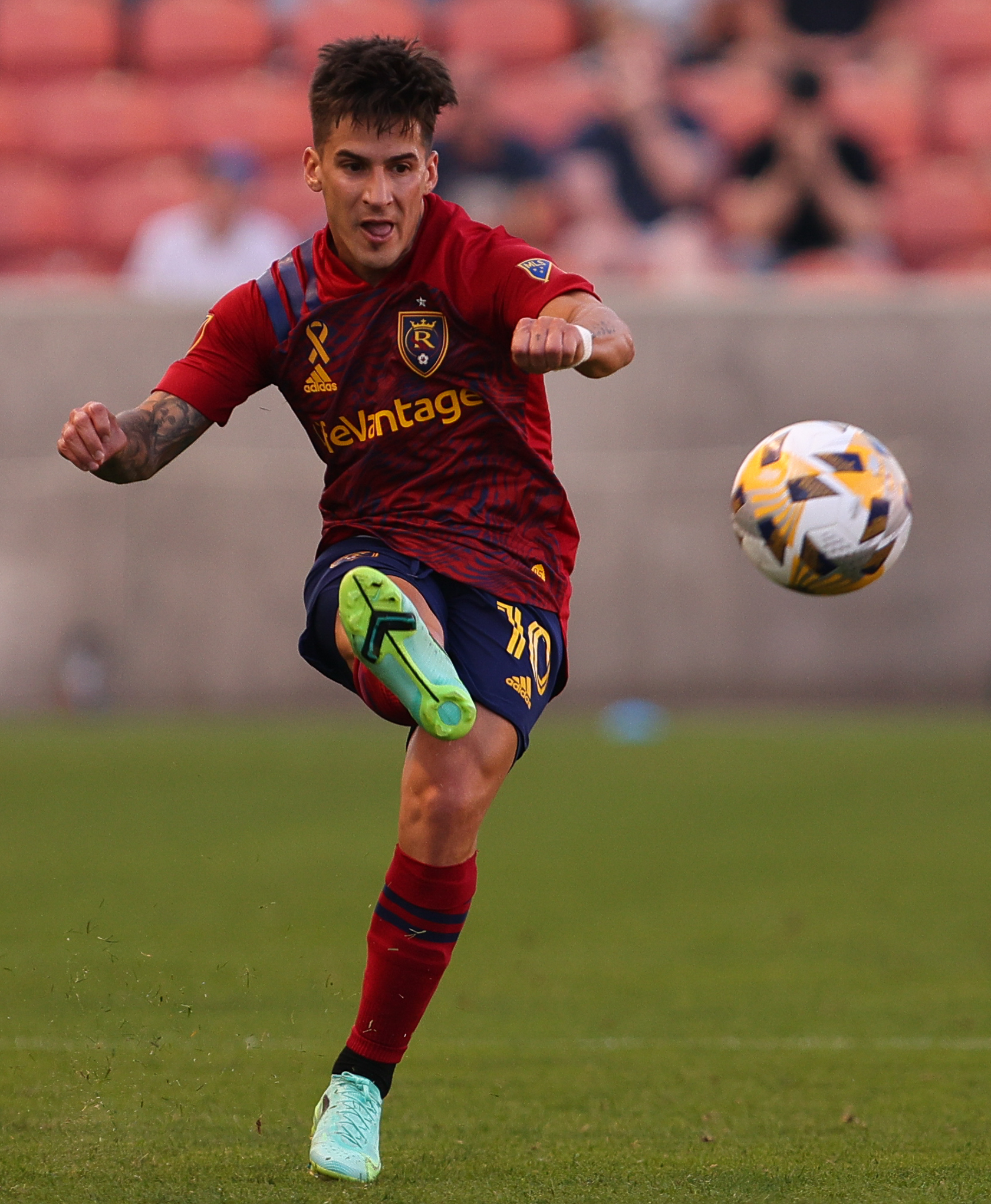
- Menéndez with Real Salt Lake in 2021

Personal information
- Full name: Jonathan Diego Menéndez
- Date of birth: 5 March 1994 (age 32)
- Place of birth: Buenos Aires, Argentina
- Height: 1.66 m (5 ft 5 in)
- Position: Winger

Team information
- Current team: Ferro Carril Oeste

Youth career
- Chacarita Juniors

Senior career*
Years	Team	Apps	(Gls)
2010–2012	Chacarita Juniors	3	(0)
2012–2015	Sevilla B	54	(4)
2015–2016	Chacarita Juniors	54	(9)
2016–2018	Talleres	30	(10)
2018–2021	Independiente	24	(6)
2018	→ Al Rayyan (loan)	4	(1)
2019–2020	→ Talleres (loan)	21	(6)
2021–2023	Real Salt Lake	21	(1)
2022–2023	→ Vélez Sarsfield (loan)	6	(0)
2023	→ Newell's Old Boys (loan)	7	(0)
2023–2024	Aris	17	(1)
2024–2025	Kifisia	13	(0)
2025–2026	San Martín SJ	12	(0)
2026–	Ferro Carril Oeste	2	(0)
- * Club domestic league appearances and goals as of 17:41, 11 April 2026 (UTC)

Jonathan Diego Menéndez (born 5 March 1994), commonly known as Jony, is an Argentine professional footballer who plays as a winger for Ferro Carril Oeste.

== Career ==
Born in Buenos Aires, Jony started his career with hometown's Chacarita Juniors, and made his debut as a professional on 5 June 2011, starting in a 0–0 draw at Boca Unidos in the Primera B Nacional. He appeared in two further matches during the campaign, as his side finished in a comfortable mid-table position.

On 1 February 2012, Jony moved abroad for the first time in his career, joining Sevilla FC. However, due to bureaucratic problems, he only played for the Juvenil squad.

Jony was promoted to the Andalusians' reserve squad in the 2012 summer, becoming a starter afterwards.

Jony was acquired by Major League Soccer club Real Salt Lake on 29 May 2021. He reportedly signed a three-year contract with the Utah team. On 12 July 2022, Jony was loaned to Vélez Sarsfield for the remainder of 2022. On 6 February 2023, Jony was recalled from his loan to Velez and loaned to Newell's Old Boys for the 2023 season.

== Personal life ==
Jonathan is the twin brother of fellow footballer Nahuel Menéndez.
