= Enzo Díaz (footballer, born 1995) =

Argentine footballer

Personal information
- Full name: Enzo Hernán Díaz
- Date of birth: 7 December 1995 (age 30)
- Place of birth: Las Toscas, Argentina
- Height: 1.75 m (5 ft 9 in)
- Position: Left-back

Team information
- Current team: São Paulo
- Number: 13

Youth career
- 2004–2017: Agropecuario

Senior career*
| Years | Team | Apps | (Gls) |
| 2015–2019 | Agropecuario | 91 | (0) |
| 2019 | → Talleres (loan) | 18 | (0) |
| 2020–2022 | Talleres | 74 | (6) |
| 2023–2025 | River Plate | 59 | (1) |
| 2025 | → São Paulo (loan) | 38 | (1) |
| 2026– | São Paulo | 13 | (0) |
- * Club domestic league appearances and goals as of 6 April 2026

Enzo Hernán Díaz (born 7 December 1995) is an Argentine professional footballer who plays as a left-back for Campeonato Brasileiro Série A club São Paulo.

== Career ==
Díaz's career began with Agropecuario. He appeared in the club's first-team squad during the 2015 and 2016 Torneo Federal B seasons, scoring two goals in thirty-nine appearances for the club. They won back-to-back promotions over the next two campaigns, going from Torneo Federal B to Primera B Nacional. He subsequently made his professional debut on 24 September 2017 during a win away to Flandria, in a season that saw Díaz scouted by Manchester United. Midway through 2018–19, on 14 January 2019, Talleres of the Primera División loaned Díaz. Talleres decided to buy him free at the end of the year. On 1 October 2023 he scored the second goal against Boca Juniors at the Superclásico in La Bombonera for the Copa de la Liga while playing for River Plate. On 7 January 2025, Díaz bid farewell to his teammates of River Plate to join São Paulo in a one-year loan.

== Career statistics ==
As of 15 January 2019.

Club statistics
| Club | Season | League | | | Cup | | Continental | | Other | | Total | |
| Club | Season | Division | Apps | Goals | Apps | Goals | Apps | Goals | Apps | Goals | Apps | Goals |
|---|---|---|---|---|---|---|---|---|---|---|---|---|
| Agropecuario | 2016–17 | Torneo Federal A | 19 | 0 | 0 | 0 | — | | 0 | 0 | 19 | 0 |
| Agropecuario | 2017–18 | Primera B Nacional | 22 | 0 | 0 | 0 | — | | 1 (Note: Appearance(s) in the Primera B Nacional play-offs) | 0 | 23 | 0 |
| Agropecuario | 2018–19 | Primera B Nacional | 12 | 0 | 1 | 0 | — | | 0 | 0 | 13 | 0 |
| Agropecuario | Total | | 53 | 0 | 1 | 0 | — | | 1 | 0 | 55 | 0 |
| Talleres (loan) | 2018–19 | Primera División | 19 | 0 | 0 | 0 | 0 | 0 | 0 | 0 | 19 | 0 |
| Career total | | | 53 | 0 | 1 | 0 | 0 | 0 | 1 | 0 | 55 | 0 |

== Honours ==
Agropecuario

- Torneo Federal A: 2016–17
