= 2018 U-20 Copa Libertadores =

Copa CONMEBOL Libertadores Sub-20 Uruguay 2018

Tournament details
- Host country: Uruguay
- City: Montevideo
- Dates: 10–24 February 2018
- Teams: 12 (from 10 associations)
- Venue: 1 (in 1 host city)

Final positions
- Champions: (Uruguay) Nacional (1st title)
- Runners-up: (Ecuador) Independiente del Valle
- Third place: (Uruguay) River Plate
- Fourth place: (Brazil) São Paulo

Tournament statistics
- Matches played: 22
- Goals scored: 77 (3.5 per match)
- Top scorer: Stiven Plaza (7 goals)

The 2018 U-20 Copa CONMEBOL Libertadores (Spanish: Copa CONMEBOL Libertadores Sub-20 2018) was the 4th edition of the U-20 Copa CONMEBOL Libertadores (also referred to as the U-20 Copa Libertadores), South America's premier under-20 club football tournament organized by CONMEBOL. The tournament was held in Uruguay from 10 to 24 February 2018.

Nacional defeated Independiente del Valle in the final to win their first title, while River Plate defeated defending champions São Paulo to finish third.

== Teams ==
The competition was contested by 12 teams: the title holders, the youth champions from each of the ten CONMEBOL member associations, and one additional team from the host association.

Players must be born on or after 1 January 1998.

Association	Team	Qualifying method	Participation	Previous best result
Argentina	Talleres	2017 Torneo Juvenil de Cuarta División (U-20) champions	1st	—
Bolivia	Quebracho	2017 U-19 Torneo Nacional champions	1st	—
Brazil	São Paulo	2016 U-20 Copa Libertadores champions	2nd	Champions (2016)
Brazil	Cruzeiro	2017 U-20 Supercopa de Brasil champions	1st	—
Chile	Colo-Colo	2017 U-19 Copa de Campeones champions	1st	—
Colombia	La Equidad	2017 U-20 Súper Copa Juvenil champions	1st	—
Ecuador	Independiente del Valle	2017 U-18 Serie A champions	4th	Quarterfinals (2011)
Paraguay	Libertad	2017 play-off winners between U-20 Apertura and Clausura champions	3rd	Quarterfinals (2011)
Peru	Sport Huancayo	2017 Torneo de Promoción y Reserva champions	1st	—
Uruguay (hosts)	Nacional	2017 U-19 Campeonato Uruguayo champions	2nd	Quarterfinals (2011)
Uruguay (hosts)	River Plate	2017 U-19 Campeonato Uruguayo runners-up	1st	—
Venezuela	Atlético Venezuela	2017 U-20 Serie Oro champions	1st	—

== Venues ==
The tournament was played at the Estadio Centenario in Montevideo.

== Draw ==
The draw was held on 25 January 2018, 16:00 UYT (UTC−3), at the headquarters of the Uruguayan Football Association. The 12 teams were drawn into three groups of four. The defending champions São Paulo were automatically seeded into Pot 1 and allocated to position A1 in the group stage, while the other two teams which also participated in the 2016 U-20 Copa Libertadores, Independiente del Valle and Libertad, were also seeded into Pot 1 and drawn to position B1 or C1 in the group stage. The remaining teams were seeded into Pot 2, and drawn to positions 2, 3 or 4 of groups A, B or C in the group stage. Teams from the same association could not be drawn into the same group.

Pot 1	Pot 2
(Brazil) São Paulo (Position A1); (Ecuador) Independiente del Valle; (Paraguay) Libertad	(Argentina) Talleres; (Bolivia) Quebracho; (Brazil) Cruzeiro; (Chile) Colo-Colo; (Colombia) La Equidad; (Peru) Sport Huancayo; (Uruguay) Nacional; (Uruguay) River Plate; Atlético Venezuela

== Group stage ==
In the group stage, the teams were ranked according to points (3 points for a win, 1 point for a draw, 0 points for a loss). If tied on points, tiebreakers were applied in the following order (Regulations Article 20):

1. Goal difference;
2. Goals scored;
3. Head-to-head result in games between tied teams;
4. Penalty shoot-out (between two teams playing against each other in the last match of the group)
5. Drawing of lots.

The winners of each group and the best runner-up among all groups advanced to the semi-finals.

All times local, UYT (UTC−3).

=== Group A ===
Pos	Team	Pld	W	D	L	GF	GA	GD	Pts	Qualification
1	(Brazil) São Paulo	3	2	1	0	13	2	+11	7	Semi-finals
2	(Argentina) Talleres	3	2	1	0	6	1	+5	7	
3	Atlético Venezuela	3	1	0	2	4	10	−6	3	
4	(Bolivia) Quebracho	3	0	0	3	1	11	−10	0	

Source: CONMEBOL
10 February 2018
16:30

São Paulo (Brazil)	6–0	(Bolivia) Quebracho
Jonas Toró 22', 37'; Gabriel Novaes 32', 58'; Gabriel Sara 49'; Fabinho 80'	Report

Estadio Centenario, Montevideo
Referee: Gustavo Tejera (Uruguay)
10 February 2018
18:45

Atlético Venezuela	0–3	(Argentina) Talleres
	Report	Nahuel Bustos 7', 48', 59'

Estadio Centenario, Montevideo
Referee: Nicolás Gallo (Colombia)

13 February 2018
16:30

São Paulo (Brazil)	6–1	Atlético Venezuela
Helinho 11'; Igor Gomes 60'; Jonas Toró 68', 83'; Rodrigo 85' (pen.); Bruno Dip 88'	Report	Yeangel Montero 64'

Estadio Centenario, Montevideo
Referee: Luis Garay (Peru)
13 February 2018
18:45

Quebracho (Bolivia)	0–2	(Argentina) Talleres
	Report	Mauro Valiente 45+1'; Nahuel Bustos 51'

Estadio Centenario, Montevideo
Referee: César Deischler (Chile)

16 February 2018
16:30

Talleres (Argentina)	1–1	(Brazil) São Paulo
Marcos Arturia 75'	Report	Igor Liziero 61'

Estadio Centenario, Montevideo
Referee: José Natanael Méndez (Paraguay)
16 February 2018
18:45

Quebracho (Bolivia)	1–3	Atlético Venezuela
Mauricio Paz 18'	Report	Robin Ramos 43', 45+2', 58'

Estadio Centenario, Montevideo
Referee: Gustavo Tejera (Uruguay)

=== Group B ===
Pos	Team	Pld	W	D	L	GF	GA	GD	Pts	Qualification
1	(Uruguay) River Plate (H)	3	2	1	0	2	0	+2	7	Semi-finals
2	(Paraguay) Libertad	3	1	2	0	5	3	+2	5	
3	(Colombia) La Equidad	3	1	1	1	4	4	0	4	
4	(Brazil) Cruzeiro	3	0	0	3	2	6	−4	0	

Source: CONMEBOL
(H) Hosts
11 February 2018
16:30

Libertad (Paraguay)	3–1	(Brazil) Cruzeiro
Jonathan Valiente 45'; Álvaro Recalade 66'; Jesús Amarilla 84'	Report	Vitinho 41'

Estadio Centenario, Montevideo
Referee: Fernando Echenique (Argentina)
11 February 2018
18:45

River Plate (Uruguay)	1–0	(Colombia) La Equidad
Facundo Vigo 78'	Report

Estadio Centenario, Montevideo
Referee: Guillermo Guerrero (Ecuador)

14 February 2018
16:30

Libertad (Paraguay)	0–0	(Uruguay) River Plate
	Report

Estadio Centenario, Montevideo
Referee: Alexis Herrera (Venezuela)
14 February 2018
18:45

Cruzeiro (Brazil)	1–2	(Colombia) La Equidad
Vitinho 4'	Report	Andrés de Armas 35'; Juan Marín 56'

Estadio Centenario, Montevideo
Referee: Ivo Méndez (Bolivia)

17 February 2018
16:30

La Equidad (Colombia)	2–2	(Paraguay) Libertad
Cristian Barrios 47'; César Castaño 67' (pen.)	Report	Esteban Maidana 49'; Jonathan Valiente 84' (pen.)

Estadio Centenario, Montevideo
Referee: Rodolpho Toski Marques (Brazil)
17 February 2018
18:45

Cruzeiro (Brazil)	0–1	(Uruguay) River Plate
	Report	Facundo Vigo 11'

Estadio Centenario, Montevideo
Referee: César Deischler (Chile)

=== Group C ===
Pos	Team	Pld	W	D	L	GF	GA	GD	Pts	Qualification
1	(Uruguay) Nacional (H)	3	2	1	0	13	0	+13	7	Semi-finals
2	(Ecuador) Independiente del Valle	3	2	1	0	11	1	+10	7	Semi-finals
3	(Chile) Colo-Colo	3	1	0	2	2	10	−8	3	
4	(Peru) Sport Huancayo	3	0	0	3	1	16	−15	0	

Source: CONMEBOL
(H) Hosts
12 February 2018
16:30

Independiente del Valle (Ecuador)	6–1	(Peru) Sport Huancayo
Plaza 29', 48', 80', 82'; Guerrero 70'; Renny Jaramillo 79'	Report	Samuel Perlaza 75' (o.g.)

Estadio Centenario, Montevideo
Referee: José Natanael Méndez (Paraguay)
12 February 2018
18:45

Colo-Colo (Chile)	0–5	(Uruguay) Nacional
	Report	May 17', 29', 50'; Vecino 38'; Ocampo 85'

Estadio Centenario, Montevideo
Referee: Rodolpho Toski Marques (Brazil)

15 February 2018
16:30

Independiente del Valle (Ecuador)	5–0	(Chile) Colo-Colo
Guerrero 14'; Williams Alarcón 34' (o.g.); Plaza 67', 69', 90+1'	Report

Estadio Centenario, Montevideo
Referee: Fernando Echenique (Argentina)
15 February 2018
18:45

Sport Huancayo (Peru)	0–8	(Uruguay) Nacional
	Report	May 3'; Vecino 38', 84'; Trasante 42'; Trezza 45'; Sanabria 66'; Sebastián Paz 78'; Gabriel Barrios 80'

Estadio Centenario, Montevideo
Referee: Nicolás Gallo (Colombia)

18 February 2018
16:30

Nacional (Uruguay)	0–0	(Ecuador) Independiente del Valle
	Report

Estadio Centenario, Montevideo
Referee: Alexis Herrera (Venezuela)
18 February 2018
18:45

Sport Huancayo (Peru)	0–2	(Chile) Colo-Colo
	Report	Salas 45', 61'

Estadio Centenario, Montevideo
Referee: Guillermo Guerrero (Ecuador)

=== Ranking of group runners-up ===
Pos	Grp	Team	Pld	W	D	L	GF	GA	GD	Pts	Qualification
1	C	(Ecuador) Independiente del Valle	3	2	1	0	11	1	+10	7	Semi-finals
2	A	(Argentina) Talleres	3	2	1	0	6	1	+5	7	
3	B	(Paraguay) Libertad	3	1	2	0	5	3	+2	5	

Source: CONMEBOL
Rules for classification: 1) Points; 2) Goal difference; 3) Goals scored; 4) Drawing of lots (Regulations Article 21).

== Knockout stage ==
The semi-final matchups were:

- Group A winner vs. Group C winner
- Group B winner vs. Best runner-up

The semi-final winners and losers played in the final and third place match respectively. If tied after full time, extra time was not played, and the penalty shoot-out was used to determine the winner (Regulations Article 22).

=== Bracket ===
Semi-finals
21 February – Centenario
(Brazil) São Paulo	0
(Uruguay) Nacional	3
21 February – Centenario
(Uruguay) River Plate	2
(Ecuador) Independiente del Valle	3

Final
24 February – Centenario
(Uruguay) Nacional	2
(Ecuador) Independiente del Valle	1
Third place
24 February – Centenario
(Brazil) São Paulo	1 (4)
(Uruguay) River Plate (p)	1 (5)

=== Semi-finals ===
21 February 2018
16:30

São Paulo (Brazil)	0–3	(Uruguay) Nacional
	Report	Laborda 31'; May 73'; Gabriel Barrios 90+2'

Estadio Centenario, Montevideo
Referee: Fernando Echenique (Argentina)

21 February 2018
18:45

River Plate (Uruguay)	2–3	(Ecuador) Independiente del Valle
Neris 51'; Vigo 53'	Report	Renny Jaramillo 40', 75'; Gonzalo Plata 73'

Estadio Centenario, Montevideo
Referee: Ivo Méndez (Bolivia)

=== Third place match ===
24 February 2018
14:15 (Note: The Third place match and Final match were originally scheduled on 24 February 2018, 16:30 and 18:45 local time, but were re-scheduled to 14:15 and 16:30 local time.)

São Paulo (Brazil)	1–1	(Uruguay) River Plate
Walce Da Silva 90'	Report	Cristian Martín 20'
Penalties
Rodrigo (penalty scored); Walce (penalty scored); Igor Gomes (penalty scored); Oliveira (penalty missed); Fabinho (penalty scored)	4–5	(penalty scored) Aaron Borges; (penalty scored) Juan Pablo Plada; (penalty scored) Santiago Pérez; (penalty scored) Diego Vicente; (penalty scored) Vigo

Estadio Centenario, Montevideo
Referee: Alexis Herrera (Venezuela)

=== Final ===
24 February 2018
16:30

Nacional (Uruguay)	2–1	(Ecuador) Independiente del Valle
Ocampo 44'; Johao Chávez 47' (o.g.)	Report	Guerrero 45' (pen.)

Estadio Centenario, Montevideo
Referee: Nicolás Gallo (Colombia)
