= 2019–20 Newell's Old Boys season =

Newell's Old Boys
2019–20 season
- President: Eduardo Bermúdez
- Manager: Frank Kudelka
- Stadium: Estadio Marcelo Bielsa
- Top goalscorer: League: Lucas Albertengo (2); Cristian Lema; All: Lucas Albertengo (2); Cristian Lema

The 2019–20 season is Newell's Old Boys' 58th consecutive season in the top division of Argentine football. In addition to the Primera División, the club are competing in the Copa Argentina and Copa de la Superliga.

The season generally covers the period from 1 July 2019 to 30 June 2020.

== Review ==
=== Pre-season ===
Víctor Figueroa was the first out, with the midfielder agreeing, on 31 May 2019, to join Ecuadorian Serie A side Aucas in the succeeding June. 11 June saw Iván Silva extend his loan with Brown. Brian Sarmiento agreed terms with Volos on 20 June. Santiago Gentiletti became their first reinforcement for the new campaign, arriving from Spanish Segunda División side Albacete. In the club's first pre-season friendly, on 29 June, they drew with Colón at the Estadio Marcelo Bielsa; Francisco Fydriszewski netted their goal. A further match was soon played, which ended in defeat for Newell's. Hours after, the exit of Franco Pérez was confirmed as he moved to Río Cuarto's Estudiantes. 2018–19 loans expired on/around 30 June. 30 June saw Lisandro Cabrera agree a Patriotas loan.

Matías Tissera was loaned to Platense on 1 July. Julián Marcioni was also added to the out on loan list, as the forward penned terms with Independiente Rivadavia. Ramiro Macagno, a goalkeeper, was loaned in from Primera B Nacional's Atlético de Rafaela on 5 July. Luís Leal and youngster Nazareno Funez scored to help Newell's beat Godoy Cruz in friendly games on 6 July. Cristian Lema secured a loan deal from Benfica on 10 July. Newell's went unbeaten in exhibition encounters with Defensa y Justicia on 13 July, coming out victorious in match two after a strike from Mauro Formica. Lucas Albertengo was captured on loan from Independiente on 13 July, while Lisandro Alzugaray and Jalil Elías left temporarily on 14 July for Central Córdoba (SdE) and Unión Santa Fe.

Jalil Elías went on loan to fellow Primera División team Unión Santa Fe on 17 July. Francisco Manenti, just off a loan stint in Peru with Unión Comercio, agreed a further temporary contract with Central Córdoba (SdE) on 17 July. Newell's met Independiente in pre-season friendlies on 17 July, sharing victories at the Estadio Libertadores de América. Newell's were held to draws in matches with Atlético de Rafaela on 20 July. Matías Orihuela, a left-back from Greek club Apollon Smyrnis, became Newell's second permanent incoming, fifth overall, on 22 July. Leonel Ferroni and Nicolás Temperini both sealed loans away later on 22 July, joining Central Córdoba (SdE) and Mitre respectively; making Ferroni the third part-time outgoing to newly promoted Santiago del Estero outfit Central Córdoba (SdE).

Hernán Bernardello, a recently returning loanee, left permanently for Belgrano on 23 July. Julián Fernández made a return to his homeland on 23 July, as he secured terms from Palestino.

=== July ===
Newell's Old Boys met Central Córdoba (SdE) in their first fixture of 2019–20 in the Primera División, defeating them after goals from Alexis Rodríguez and Lucas Albertengo. Rodrigo Salinas was loaned from Vélez Sarsfield on 30 July. Newell's had two friendly encounters with Primera B Nacional's Sarmiento on 31 July, losing the first after a Pablo Magnín brace before winning game two later in the day.

=== August ===
Newell's made a seventh new signing on 1 August, as Lucas Villarruel joined from Defensa y Justicia. Their Primera División fixture with Independiente was postponed in early August, after Independiente and CONMEBOL had disagreements regarding the scheduling of a Copa Sudamericana encounter. Newell's won two friendlies over Central Córdoba (R) on 9 August, scoring three goals in the process. Francisco Fydriszewski joined Chile's Deportes Antofagasta on a five-month loan on 13 August. 17 August saw Unión Santa Fe travel to the Estadio Marcelo Bielsa, with Newell's beating them by two goals to nil; matching their result from matchday one. Newell's put four past Argentino in a friendly on 20 August; a game that was set for unused players from the Unión win.

Maximiliano Ribero signed with Torneo Federal A side Sportivo Las Parejas on loan for twelve months on 21 August. On 22 August, youngster Enzo Barrenechea was transferred to Swiss Super League side Sion. Newell's suffered their first dropped points of 2019–20 on 24 August, as Vélez Sarsfield put three past them at the José Amalfitani Stadium. Joaquín Torres headed off on loan to Greek club Volos on 26 August, joining Brian Sarmiento who did similar on 1 July. After prematurely returning from Patriotas, Lisandro Cabrera was loaned out again to Gimnasia y Esgrima (M).

=== September ===
Newell's thrashed Huracán 4–1 on 1 September, which maintained their competitive 100% record at home in 2019–20. Newell's confirmed, on 3 September, that youngster Diego González had joined Torneo Federal A's San Martín on loan.

== Squad ==
Squad No.	Nationality	Name	Position(s)	Date of birth (age)	Signed from
Goalkeepers
1	Argentina	Alan Aguerre	GK	23 August 1990 (age 36)	Vélez Sarsfield
23	Argentina	Nelson Ibáñez	GK	13 November 1991 (age 34)	Tigre
	Argentina	Ramiro Macagno	GK	18 March 1997 (age 29)	Atlético de Rafaela (loan)
Defenders
2	Argentina	Cristian Lema	CB	24 March 1990 (age 36)	Benfica (loan)
3	Argentina	Leandro Grimi	LB	9 February 1985 (age 41)	Racing Club
4	Uruguay	Ángelo Gabrielli	RB	23 September 1992 (age 34)	Liverpool
6	Argentina	Santiago Gentiletti	CB	9 January 1985 (age 41)	Albacete
24	Argentina	Fabricio Fontanini	CB	30 March 1990 (age 36)	O'Higgins
28	Argentina	Mariano Bíttolo	LB	24 April 1990 (age 36)	Albacete
29	Argentina	Stefano Callegari	CB	6 January 1997 (age 29)	Academy
35	Argentina	Facundo Nadalín	RB	16 August 1997 (age 29)	Academy
39	Argentina	Alan Luque	CB	20 February 1999 (age 27)	Academy
42	Argentina	Juan Pablo Freytes	CB	11 January 2000 (age 26)	Academy
	Argentina	Gabriel Báez	LB	21 July 1995 (age 31)	Academy
	Argentina	Matías Orihuela	LB	24 March 1990 (age 36)	Apollon Smyrnis
Midfielders
8	Argentina	Braian Rivero	CM	22 February 1996 (age 30)	Academy
11	Argentina	Maxi Rodríguez	RM	2 January 1981 (age 45)	Peñarol
17	Argentina	Emanuel Biancucchi	AM	28 July 1988 (age 38)	Melgar
20	Argentina	Julián Fernández	CM	22 March 1995 (age 31)	Palestino
21	Argentina	Denis Rodríguez	RM	21 March 1996 (age 30)	Academy
26	Argentina	Lucas Villarruel	DM	13 November 1990 (age 35)	Defensa y Justicia
31	Argentina	Jerónimo Cacciabue	CM	24 January 1998 (age 28)	Academy
33	Argentina	Mauro Formica	AM	4 April 1988 (age 38)	UNAM
38	Argentina	Juan Manuel Requena	CM	24 January 1999 (age 27)	Academy
43	Argentina	Aníbal Moreno	CM	13 May 1999 (age 27)	Academy
	Uruguay	Ribair Rodríguez	RM	4 October 1987 (age 39)	Danubio (loan)
Forwards
7	São Tomé and Príncipe	Luís Leal	CF	29 May 1987 (age 39)	Chiapas
14	Argentina	Alexis Rodríguez	CF	21 March 1996 (age 30)	Academy
19	Argentina	Rodrigo Salinas	CF	4 July 1986 (age 40)	Vélez Sarsfield (loan)
22	Argentina	Cristian Insaurralde	CF	20 July 1991 (age 35)	O'Higgins
25	Argentina	Enzo Cabrera	RW	20 November 1990 (age 35)	Academy
30	Argentina	Lucas Albertengo	CF	30 January 1991 (age 35)	Independiente (loan)
44	Argentina	Francisco González	FW	6 April 2001 (age 25)	Academy
	Argentina	Ignacio Huguenet	CF	5 March 1998 (age 28)	Academy
	Argentina	Daniel Opazo	CF	8 November 1996 (age 30)	Academy
	Argentina	Mauricio Tévez	CF	31 July 1996 (age 30)	Academy
	Argentina	Milton Treppo	CF	13 May 1996 (age 30)	Academy
Out on loan					Loaned to
9	Argentina	Francisco Fydriszewski	CF	13 April 1993 (age 33)	Deportes Antofagasta
12	Argentina	Nicolás Temperini	GK	9 February 1995 (age 31)	Mitre
18	Argentina	Joaquín Torres	AM	28 January 1997 (age 29)	Volos
27	Argentina	Julián Marcioni	FW	19 March 1998 (age 28)	Independiente Rivadavia
36	Argentina	Lisandro Alzugaray	AM	17 April 1990 (age 36)	Central Córdoba (SdE)
41	Argentina	Maximiliano Ribero	AM	22 December 1997 (age 28)	Sportivo Las Parejas
	Argentina	Jalil Elías	CM	25 April 1996 (age 30)	Unión Santa Fe
	Argentina	Leonel Ferroni	LB	29 January 1996 (age 30)	Central Córdoba (SdE)
	Argentina	Francisco Manenti	CB	31 October 1996 (age 30)	Central Córdoba (SdE)
	Argentina	Nahuel Cisneros	AM	17 February 1998 (age 28)	Náutico
	Argentina	Lisandro Cabrera	FW	4 January 1998 (age 28)	Gimnasia y Esgrima (M)
	Argentina	Diego González	MF		San Martín
	Argentina	Carlos Rotondi	FW	29 December 1995 (age 30)	San Luis
	Argentina	Iván Silva	CM	22 January 1994 (age 32)	Brown
	Argentina	Matías Tissera	FW	6 September 1996 (age 30)	Platense

== Transfers ==
Domestic transfer windows:
3 July 2019 to 24 September 2019
20 January 2020 to 19 February 2020.

=== Transfers in ===
Date from	Position	Nationality	Name	From	Ref.
3 July 2019 (Note: Deal agreed on 25 June 2019)	CB	Argentina	Santiago Gentiletti	Albacete	
22 July 2019	LB	Argentina	Matías Orihuela	Apollon Smyrnis	
23 July 2019	CM	Argentina	Julián Fernández	Palestino	
1 August 2019	DM	Argentina	Lucas Villarruel	Defensa y Justicia	

=== Transfers out ===
Date from	Position	Nationality	Name	To	Ref.
24 June 2019 (Note: Deal agreed on 31 May 2019)	AM	Argentina	Víctor Figueroa	Aucas	
1 July 2019 (Note: Deal agreed on 20 June 2019)	AM	Argentina	Brian Sarmiento	Volos	
3 July 2019 (Note: Deal agreed on 29 June 2019)	FW	Argentina	Franco Pérez	Estudiantes (RC)	
23 July 2019	CM	Argentina	Hernán Bernardello	Belgrano	
22 August 2019	MF	Argentina	Enzo Barrenechea	Sion	

=== Loans in ===
Start date	Position	Nationality	Name	From	End date	Ref.
5 July 2019	GK	Argentina	Ramiro Macagno	Atlético de Rafaela	30 June 2020	
10 July 2019	CB	Argentina	Cristian Lema	Benfica	30 June 2020	
13 July 2019	CF	Argentina	Lucas Albertengo	Independiente	30 June 2020	
30 July 2019	CF	Argentina	Rodrigo Salinas	Vélez Sarsfield	30 June 2020	

=== Loans out ===
Start date	Position	Nationality	Name	To	End date	Ref.
3 July 2019 (Note: Deal agreed on 1 July 2019)	FW	Argentina	Matías Tissera	Platense	30 June 2020	
4 July 2019	FW	Argentina	Julián Marcioni	Independiente Rivadavia	30 June 2020	
8 July 2019 (Note: Deal agreed on 30 June 2019)	FW	Argentina	Lisandro Cabrera	Patriotas	31 December 2019	
14 July 2019	AM	Argentina	Lisandro Alzugaray	Central Córdoba (SdE)	30 June 2020	
17 July 2019	CM	Argentina	Jalil Elías	Unión Santa Fe	30 June 2020	
17 July 2019	CB	Argentina	Francisco Manenti	Central Córdoba (SdE)	30 June 2020	
22 July 2019	LB	Argentina	Leonel Ferroni	Central Córdoba (SdE)	30 June 2020	
22 July 2019	GK	Argentina	Nicolás Temperini	Mitre	30 June 2020	
13 August 2019	CF	Argentina	Francisco Fydriszewski	Deportes Antofagasta	31 December 2019	
21 August 2019	AM	Argentina	Maximiliano Ribero	Sportivo Las Parejas	30 June 2020	
26 August 2019	AM	Argentina	Joaquín Torres	Volos	30 June 2020	
27 August 2019	FW	Argentina	Lisandro Cabrera	Gimnasia y Esgrima (M)	30 June 2020	
3 September 2019	MF	Argentina	Diego González	San Martín	30 June 2020	

== Friendlies ==
=== Pre-season ===
A friendly match with Godoy Cruz was announced for Newell's Old Boys on 15 June 2019. They also had a fixture with Defensa y Justicia scheduled on 27 June, with it to take place on 13 July. Further friendlies with Colón, Atlético de Rafaela and Independiente were set.

Win Draw Loss

29 June 2019 Friendly	Newell's Old Boys	1–1	Colón	Rosario, Argentina
	F. Fydriszewski	Newell's Old Boys; 70 min. match	C. Bernardi	Stadium: Estadio Marcelo Bielsa; Attendance: 0 (Note: Behind closed doors.)

29 June 2019 Friendly	Newell's Old Boys	0–1	Colón	Rosario, Argentina
		Newell's Old Boys; 70 min. match	N. Leguizamón (pen.)	Stadium: Estadio Marcelo Bielsa; Attendance: 0 (Note: Behind closed doors.)

6 July 2019 Friendly	Newell's Old Boys	2–0	Godoy Cruz	Rosario, Argentina
10:00 GMT-3	L. Leal	Newell's Old Boys; Rosario3; 80 min. match		Stadium: Estadio Marcelo Bielsa

6 July 2019 Friendly	Newell's Old Boys	1–0	Godoy Cruz	Rosario, Argentina
	N. Funez	Newell's Old Boys; Rosario3; 80 min. match		Stadium: Estadio Marcelo Bielsa

13 July 2019 Friendly	Defensa y Justicia	0–0	Newell's Old Boys	Florencio Varela, Argentina
		Newell's Old Boys; Rosario3; 80 min. match		Stadium: Predio Áreas Grandes

13 July 2019 Friendly	Defensa y Justicia	0–1	Newell's Old Boys	Florencio Varela, Argentina
		Newell's Old Boys; Rosario3; 80 min. match	M. Formica	Stadium: Predio Áreas Grandes

17 July 2019 Friendly	Independiente	0–1	Newell's Old Boys	Avellaneda, Argentina
		Newell's Old Boys; TyC Sports; 80 min. match	A. Rodríguez	Stadium: Estadio Libertadores de América

17 July 2019 Friendly	Independiente	3–0	Newell's Old Boys	Avellaneda, Argentina
	S. Romero	Newell's Old Boys; TyC Sports; 80 min. match		Stadium: Estadio Libertadores de América

20 July 2019 Friendly	Newell's Old Boys	0–0	Atlético de Rafaela	Rosario, Argentina
		Newell's Old Boys; Diario La Opinión; 60 min. match		Stadium: Centro de Entrenamiento Jorge Griffa

20 July 2019 Friendly	Newell's Old Boys	1–1	Atlético de Rafaela	Rosario, Argentina
	A. Rodríguez	Newell's Old Boys; Diario La Opinión	M. Godoy	Stadium: Centro de Entrenamiento Jorge Griffa

=== Mid-season ===
Newell's Old Boys agreed to play Sarmiento in friendlies on 31 July. Central Córdoba (R) would play Newell's on 9 August, as would Argentino on 20 August.

Win Draw Loss

31 July 2019 Friendly	Newell's Old Boys	1–2	Sarmiento	Rosario, Argentina
	L. Albertengo	Newell's Old Boys; Grupo La Provincia; 60 min. match	P. Magnín	Stadium: Centro de Entrenamiento Jorge Griffa

31 July 2019 Friendly	Newell's Old Boys	2–0	Sarmiento	Rosario, Argentina
	Goal	Sarmiento; 60 min. match		Stadium: Centro de Entrenamiento Jorge Griffa

9 August 2019 Friendly	Newell's Old Boys	1–0	Central Córdoba (R)	Rosario, Argentina
	M. Bíttolo	Newell's Old Boys; Vía País; 70 min. match		Stadium: Estadio Marcelo Bielsa

9 August 2019 Friendly	Newell's Old Boys	2–0	Central Córdoba (R)	Rosario, Argentina
	F. Fydriszewski; R. Salinas	Newell's Old Boys; Vía País; 70 min. match		Stadium: Estadio Marcelo Bielsa

20 August 2019 Friendly	Newell's Old Boys	4–0	Argentino	Rosario, Argentina
	D. Rodríguez; R. Salinas; F. González; L. Leal	Newell's Old Boys; Rosario Nuestro; 70 min. match		Stadium: Centro de Entrenamiento Jorge Griffa

== Competitions ==
=== Primera División ===
==== League table ====
Pos	Team	Pld	W	D	L	GF	GA	GD	Pts
8	San Lorenzo	23	11	3	9	32	30	+2	36
9	Rosario Central	23	9	9	5	31	29	+2	36
10	Newell's Old Boys	23	9	8	6	33	25	+8	35
11	Arsenal	23	9	7	7	37	32	+5	34
12	Talleres (C)	23	10	4	9	34	30	+4	34

Source: AFA
Rules for classification: 1) points; 2) play-off (only if needed to decide championship); 3) goal difference; 4) goals scored; 5) head-to-head points; 6) head-to-head goal difference; 7) head-to-head goals scored.

==== Relegation table ====
Pos	Team	2017–18 Pts	2018–19 Pts	2019–20 Pts	Total Pts	Total Pld	Avg	Relegation
17	Aldosivi	—	33	4	37	30	1.233	
18	Patronato	33	26	10	69	57	1.211	
19	Newell's Old Boys	29	29	9	67	56	1.196	
20	Banfield	35	29	4	68	57	1.193	
21	Colón	41	23	4	68	57	1.193	

Source: AFA

==== Results summary ====
Overall								Home						Away					
Pld	W	D	L	GF	GA	GD	Pts	W	D	L	GF	GA	GD	W	D	L	GF	GA	GD
4	3	0	1	9	4	+5	9	3	0	0	8	1	+7	0	0	1	1	3	−2

Last updated: 2 September 2019.
Source: Soccerway

==== Matches ====
The fixtures for the 2019–20 campaign were released on 10 July.

Win Draw Loss

28 July 2019 1	Newell's Old Boys	2–0	Central Córdoba (SdE)	Rosario, Argentina
13:15 GMT-3	A. Rodríguez 45'; L. Albertengo 86'	Newell's Old Boys; Infobae; Soccerway		Stadium: Estadio Marcelo Bielsa; Referee: Facundo Tello (Argentina)

5 August 2019 2	Independiente	Postponed	Newell's Old Boys	Avellaneda, Argentina
21:10 GMT-3		Infobae		Stadium: Estadio Libertadores de América

17 August 2019 2	Newell's Old Boys	2–0	Unión Santa Fe	Rosario, Argentina
15:30 GMT-3	F. Nadalín 57'; L. Albertengo 83'	Newell's Old Boys; Infobae; Soccerway		Stadium: Estadio Marcelo Bielsa; Referee: Ariel Penel (Argentina)

24 August 2019 3	Vélez Sarsfield	3–1	Newell's Old Boys	Buenos Aires, Argentina
15:30 GMT-3	N. Domínguez 30', 62'; L. Janson 71'	Newell's Old Boys; Infobae; Soccerway	M. Rodríguez 38'	Stadium: José Amalfitani Stadium; Referee: Germán Delfino (Argentina)

1 September 2019 4	Newell's Old Boys	4–1	Huracán	Rosario, Argentina
13:15 GMT-3	M. Formica 6'; C. Lema 33', 90+5' (pen.); Á. Gabrielli 68'	Newell's Old Boys; Infobae; Soccerway	F. Coniglio 38'	Stadium: Estadio Marcelo Bielsa; Referee: Néstor Pitana (Argentina)

5	Rosario Central	2–3	Newell's Old Boys	Rosario, Argentina
				Stadium: Estadio Gigante de Arroyito

=== Copa Argentina ===
Win Draw Loss

	–
00:00 GMT-3

=== Copa de la Superliga ===
Win Draw Loss

	–
00:00 GMT-3

== Squad statistics ==
=== Appearances and goals ===
No.	Pos.	Nationality	Name	League		Cup		League Cup		Continental		Total		Discipline		Ref
No.	Pos.	Nationality	Name	Apps	Goals	Apps	Goals	Apps	Goals	Apps	Goals	Apps	Goals	Yellow card	Red card	Ref
1	GK	Argentina	Alan Aguerre	4	0	0	0	0	0	—		4	0	0	0	
2	CB	Argentina	Cristian Lema	4	2	0	0	0	0	—		4	2	0	0	
3	LB	Argentina	Leandro Grimi	0	0	0	0	0	0	—		0	0	0	0	
4	RB	Uruguay	Ángelo Gabrielli	1(2)	1	0	0	0	0	—		1(2)	1	0	0	
6	CB	Argentina	Santiago Gentiletti	4	0	0	0	0	0	—		4	0	1	0	
7	CF	São Tomé and Príncipe	Luís Leal	1	0	0	0	0	0	—		1	0	0	0	
8	CM	Argentina	Braian Rivero	0	0	0	0	0	0	—		0	0	0	0	
9	CF	Argentina	Francisco Fydriszewski	1	0	0	0	0	0	—		1	0	0	0	
10	AM	Argentina	Mauro Formica	4	1	0	0	0	0	—		4	1	2	0	
11	RM	Argentina	Maxi Rodríguez	4	1	0	0	0	0	—		4	1	0	0	
12	GK	Argentina	Nicolás Temperini	0	0	0	0	0	0	—		0	0	0	0	
14	CF	Argentina	Alexis Rodríguez	3	1	0	0	0	0	—		3	1	2	0	
17	AM	Argentina	Emanuel Biancucchi	0	0	0	0	0	0	—		0	0	0	0	
18	AM	Argentina	Joaquín Torres	0	0	0	0	0	0	—		0	0	0	0	
19	CF	Argentina	Rodrigo Salinas	0(3)	0	0	0	0	0	—		0(3)	0	0	0	
20	CM	Argentina	Julián Fernández	4	0	0	0	0	0	—		4	0	3	0	
21	RM	Argentina	Denis Rodríguez	0(4)	0	0	0	0	0	—		0(4)	0	0	0	
22	CF	Argentina	Cristian Insaurralde	0	0	0	0	0	0	—		0	0	0	0	
23	GK	Argentina	Nelson Ibáñez	0	0	0	0	0	0	—		0	0	0	0	
24	CB	Argentina	Fabricio Fontanini	0	0	0	0	0	0	—		0	0	0	0	
25	RW	Argentina	Enzo Cabrera	0	0	0	0	0	0	—		0	0	0	0	
26	DM	Argentina	Lucas Villarruel	0(2)	0	0	0	0	0	—		0(2)	0	0	0	
27	FW	Argentina	Julián Marcioni	0	0	0	0	0	0	—		0	0	0	0	
28	LB	Argentina	Mariano Bíttolo	4	0	0	0	0	0	—		4	0	1	0	
29	CB	Argentina	Stefano Callegari	0	0	0	0	0	0	—		0	0	0	0	
30	CF	Argentina	Lucas Albertengo	3(1)	2	0	0	0	0	—		3(1)	2	0	0	
31	CM	Argentina	Jerónimo Cacciabue	4	0	0	0	0	0	—		4	0	2	0	
35	RB	Argentina	Facundo Nadalín	3	1	0	0	0	0	—		3	1	0	0	
36	AM	Argentina	Lisandro Alzugaray	0	0	0	0	0	0	—		0	0	0	0	
38	CM	Argentina	Juan Manuel Requena	0	0	0	0	0	0	—		0	0	0	0	
39	CB	Argentina	Alan Luque	0	0	0	0	0	0	—		0	0	0	0	
41	AM	Argentina	Maximiliano Ribero	0	0	0	0	0	0	—		0	0	0	0	
42	CB	Argentina	Juan Pablo Freytes	0	0	0	0	0	0	—		0	0	0	0	
43	CM	Argentina	Aníbal Moreno	0	0	0	0	0	0	—		0	0	0	0	
44	FW	Argentina	Francisco González	0	0	0	0	0	0	—		0	0	0	0	
–	LB	Argentina	Gabriel Báez	0	0	0	0	0	0	—		0	0	0	0	
–	FW	Argentina	Lisandro Cabrera	0	0	0	0	0	0	—		0	0	0	0	
–	AM	Argentina	Nahuel Cisneros	0	0	0	0	0	0	—		0	0	0	0	
–	CM	Argentina	Jalil Elías	0	0	0	0	0	0	—		0	0	0	0	
–	LB	Argentina	Leonel Ferroni	0	0	0	0	0	0	—		0	0	0	0	
–	MF	Argentina	Diego González	0	0	0	0	0	0	—		0	0	0	0	
–	CF	Argentina	Ignacio Huguenet	0	0	0	0	0	0	—		0	0	0	0	
–	GK	Argentina	Ramiro Macagno	0	0	0	0	0	0	—		0	0	0	0	
–	CB	Argentina	Francisco Manenti	0	0	0	0	0	0	—		0	0	0	0	
–	CF	Argentina	Daniel Opazo	0	0	0	0	0	0	—		0	0	0	0	
–	LB	Argentina	Matías Orihuela	0	0	0	0	0	0	—		0	0	0	0	
–	RM	Uruguay	Ribair Rodríguez	0	0	0	0	0	0	—		0	0	0	0	
–	RW	Argentina	Carlos Rotondi	0	0	0	0	0	0	—		0	0	0	0	
–	CM	Argentina	Iván Silva	0	0	0	0	0	0	—		0	0	0	0	
–	CF	Argentina	Mauricio Tévez	0	0	0	0	0	0	—		0	0	0	0	
–	FW	Argentina	Matías Tissera	0	0	0	0	0	0	—		0	0	0	0	
–	CF	Argentina	Milton Treppo	0	0	0	0	0	0	—		0	0	0	0	
Own goals				—	0	—	0	—	0	—		—	0	—	—	—

Statistics accurate as of 2 September 2019.

=== Goalscorers ===
Rank	Pos	No.	Nat	Name	League	Cup	League Cup	Continental	Total	Ref
1	CF	30	Argentina	Lucas Albertengo	2	0	0	–	2	
1	CB	2	Argentina	Cristian Lema	2	0	0	–	2	
2	CF	14	Argentina	Alexis Rodríguez	1	0	0	–	1	
2	RB	35	Argentina	Facundo Nadalín	1	0	0	–	1	
2	RM	11	Argentina	Maxi Rodríguez	1	0	0	–	1	
2	AM	33	Argentina	Mauro Formica	1	0	0	–	1	
2	RB	4	Uruguay	Ángelo Gabrielli	1	0	0	–	1	
Own goals					0	0	0	–	0	
Totals					9	0	0	–	9	—
