= Treppo =

Treppo may refer to:

- Milton Treppo, an Argentine professional footballer
- Treppo Carnico, frazione of Treppo Ligosullo in the Province of Udine in the Italian region Friuli-Venezia Giulia
- Treppo Grande, municipality in the Italian region Friuli-Venezia Giulia
- Treppo Ligosullo, comune in the Province of Udine in the Italian region Friuli-Venezia Giulia
