= Jerónimo Cacciabue =

Argentine footballer (born 1998)

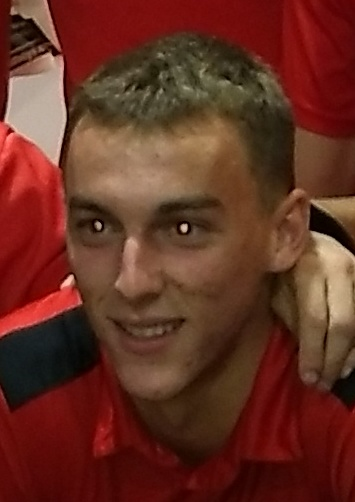

Personal information
- Full name: Jerónimo Cacciabue
- Date of birth: 24 January 1998 (age 28)
- Place of birth: Montes de Oca, Argentina
- Height: 1.73 m (5 ft 8 in)
- Position: Central midfielder

Team information
- Current team: Universidad Católica
- Number: 5

Youth career
- Montes de Oca
- 2014–2018: Newell's Old Boys

Senior career*
Years	Team	Apps	(Gls)
2018–2024	Newell's Old Boys	85	(7)
2022	→ Miedź Legnica (loan)	11	(0)
2023	→ Platense (loan)	18	(0)
2025–	Universidad Católica	20	(0)
- * Club domestic league appearances and goals as of 20 August 2025

Jerónimo Cacciabue (born 24 January 1998) is an Argentine professional footballer who plays as a central midfielder for Ecuadorian Serie A club Universidad Católica.

== Career ==
Cacciabue began his senior career with Newell's Old Boys, having signed from his local club Montes de Oca. The 2017–18 Argentine Primera División season saw Cacciabue begin to feature in senior football, with the midfielder making his pro debut on 16 April 2018 in the league against Talleres; having been an unused substitute three times in all competitions earlier in the season. In the match against Talleres, Cacciabue played the full duration of a 2–1 victory; with Newell's winning thanks to an 84th-minute winner from Cacciabue. He ended the 2017–18 season with four appearances, before appearing in twenty games in the 2018–19 campaign as he penned new terms.

On 4 July 2022, Cacciabue moved to Polish Ekstraklasa side Miedź Legnica on a one-year loan with an option to buy.

On 8 January 2025, Cacciabue left Newell's Old Boys permanently to join Ecuadorian Serie A side Universidad Católica.

== Career statistics ==
As of 2 September 2019.

Club statistics
Club	Season	League			Cup		League Cup		Continental		Other		Total	
Club	Season	Division	Apps	Goals	Apps	Goals	Apps	Goals	Apps	Goals	Apps	Goals	Apps	Goals
Newell's Old Boys	2017–18	Primera División	4	1	0	0	—		0	0	0	0	4	1
Newell's Old Boys	2018–19	Primera División	17	0	1	0	2	0	—		0	0	20	0
Newell's Old Boys	2019–20	Primera División	4	0	0	0	0	0	—		0	0	4	0
Career total			25	1	1	0	2	0	0	0	0	0	28	1
