= Facundo Nadalín =

Argentine footballer

Personal information
- Full name: Facundo Agustín Nadalin
- Date of birth: 19 August 1997 (age 29)
- Place of birth: Rosario, Argentina
- Height: 1.76 m (5 ft 9 1/2 in)
- Position: Right-back

Team information
- Current team: San Martín SJ

Youth career
- Malvinas Argentinas
- 2011–2017: Newell's Old Boys

Senior career*
Years	Team	Apps	(Gls)
2017–2023	Newell's Old Boys	38	(1)
2021–2022	→ Atlético Rafaela (loan)	14	(0)
2023–2026	Gimnasia Mendoza	87	(1)
2026–	San Martín SJ	0	(0)
- * Club domestic league appearances and goals as of 18:53, 19 March 2026 (UTC)

Facundo Agustín Nadalin (born 19 August 1997) is an Argentine professional footballer who plays as a right-back for San Martín SJ.

== Career ==
Newell's Old Boys signed Nadalín to their youth system in 2011 from Malvinas Argentinas. Six years later, in December 2017, he made his professional debut during a 2–2 draw against Racing Club on 2 December. Four further appearances followed in all competitions in his debut campaign of 2017–18, including a continental competition bow in the 2018 Copa Sudamericana versus Atlético Paranaense. After twenty-one games across 2018–19, Nadalin scored his first competitive goal in his second match of 2019–20 versus Unión Santa Fe on 17 August 2019.

On 5 August 2021, Nadalín was loaned out to Primera Nacional club Atlético de Rafaela until the end of 2022 with a purchase option.

== Career statistics ==
As of 18 August 2019.

Club statistics
Club	Season	League			Cup		League Cup		Continental		Other		Total	
Club	Season	Division	Apps	Goals	Apps	Goals	Apps	Goals	Apps	Goals	Apps	Goals	Apps	Goals
Newell's Old Boys	2017–18	Primera División	3	0	1	0	—		1 (Note: Appearance(s) in the Copa Sudamericana)	0	0	0	5	0
Newell's Old Boys	2018–19	Primera División	17	0	2	0	2	0	—		0	0	21	0
Newell's Old Boys	2019–20	Primera División	2	1	0	0	0	0	—		0	0	2	1
Career total			22	1	3	0	2	0	1	0	0	0	28	1
