= Luque (disambiguation) =

Luque may refer to:

- Luque, a city in Central Department, Paraguay
- Luque, Spain, a city in Spanish province of Córdoba

== People ==
Luque is a surname of Spanish and Portuguese origin. Notable people with the name include:

- Agustin de Luque y Coca (1850–1937), Spanish military general and Minister of War
- Alan Luque (b. 1999), Argentine footballer
- Albert Luque (b. 1979), Spanish footballer
- Antonio Luque (b. 1941), Spanish scientist and entrepreneur in the field of photovoltaic solar energy
- Aurora Luque (b. 1962), Spanish writer, poet, translator and teacher
- Carlos Luque (b. 1993), Argentine footballer
- Crisanto Luque Sánchez (1889–1959), Colombian cardinal of the Roman Catholic Church
- Dolf Luque (1890–1957), Cuban Major League Baseball pitcher
- Eduardo Castro Luque, assassinated Mexican politician
- Francisco Luque (b. 1948), Spanish sculptor
- Gregorio Luque (1942–2026), Mexican baseball player and manager
- Hernando de Luque (d. 1533), Spanish priest
- Iker Luque (born 2005), Spanish footballer
- Joan Luque (b. 1992), Spanish footballer
- Joaquín Luque Roselló (1865–1932), Spanish painter
- Jorge Luque (b. 1981), Spanish footballer
- Jorge Luque (cyclist) (1936–2024), Colombian cyclist
- José Antonio Luque (b. 1974), Spanish footballer who played as goalkeeper
- José Juan Luque (b. 1977), Spanish footballer
- Julián Luque (b. 1992), Spanish footballer
- Leopoldo Luque (1949–2021), Argentine football player
- Luis Luque (b. 1956), Argentine film and television actor
- Manuel Luque (1853/54–1924), Spanish-born caricaturist, lithographer, designer and painter, who spent most of his career in Paris
- Marco Luque (b. 1974), Brazilian comedian
- Maria Josep Colomer i Luque (1913–2004), pioneering female pilot from Barcelona
- Mauro Luque (b. 1999), Argentine footballer
- Miguel Ángel Luque (b. 1990), Spanish footballer
- Miguel Luque Ávila (b. 1976), Spanish Paralympic swimmer
- Samuel de Luque Batuecas (b. 1989), known online as Vegetta777, Spanish gaming YouTuber
- Santi Luque (b. 1993), Spanish footballer
- Sergio Luque, Mexican composer
- Vicente Luque (b. 1991), Brazilian mixed martial artist
- Virginia Luque (1927–2014), Argentine tango singer and film actress
