= Maximiliano Ribero =

Argentine footballer

Personal information
- Full name: Emanuel Maximiliano Ribero
- Date of birth: 22 December 1997 (age 28)
- Place of birth: Aristóbulo del Valle, Argentina
- Height: 1.69 m (5 ft 6 1/2 in)
- Position: Attacking midfielder

Team information
- Current team: Central Norte

Youth career
- Newell's Old Boys

Senior career*
Years	Team	Apps	(Gls)
2017–2020	Newell's Old Boys	2	(0)
2019–2020	→ Sportivo Las Parejas (loan)	19	(0)
2020–2021	Sportivo Las Parejas	26	(1)
2022	Intercity	12	(0)
2022–2023	Hércules	28	(0)
2023–2025	Llerenense	32	(0)
2025–	Central Norte	29	(0)
- * Club domestic league appearances and goals as of 17:24, 24 April 2026 (UTC)

Emanuel Maximiliano Ribero (born 22 December 1997) is an Argentine professional footballer who plays for Central Norte.

== Career ==
Ribero began in the youth system of Newell's Old Boys. He made his professional debut in June 2017, featuring for the final thirteen minutes of a 4–1 home victory over Central Norte in the Copa Argentina. Ribero was selected in the Argentine Primera División for the first time in the following November, with the midfielder playing in a home loss to Belgrano on 17 November. He made a further appearance in 2018–19 against Argentinos Juniors, prior to departing on loan at the start of 2019–20 to Sportivo Las Parejas in Torneo Federal A. Twenty-one total appearances followed. Shortly after, he signed permanently with the club.

At the end of January 2022, Ribero joined Spanish Segunda División RFEF club CF Intercity on a deal until the end of June 2022.

== Career statistics ==
As of 28 October 2020.

Club statistics
Club	Season	League			Cup		League Cup		Continental		Other		Total	
Club	Season	Division	Apps	Goals	Apps	Goals	Apps	Goals	Apps	Goals	Apps	Goals	Apps	Goals
Newell's Old Boys	2016–17	Primera División	0	0	1	0	—		—		0	0	1	0
Newell's Old Boys	2017–18	Primera División	1	0	0	0	—		0	0	0	0	1	0
Newell's Old Boys	2018–19	Primera División	1	0	0	0	0	0	—		0	0	1	0
Newell's Old Boys	2019–20	Primera División	0	0	0	0	0	0	—		0	0	0	0
Newell's Old Boys	Total		2	0	1	0	0	0	0	0	0	0	3	0
Sportivo Las Parejas (loan)	2019–20	Torneo Federal A	19	0	2	0	—		—		0	0	21	0
Career total			21	0	3	0	0	0	0	0	0	0	24	0
