= Well Done (2016 film) =

- Directed by: Riccardo Di Gerlando
- Written by: Riccardo Di Gerlando
- Screenplay by: Nicola Lucchi
- Produced by: Sanremo Cinema
- Starring: Marco Pingiotti; Anselmo Nicolino; Elio Markese; Franco La Sacra; Marinella Rambaldi
- Cinematography: Simone Caridi
- Music by: Matteo Consoli
- Distributed by: Associak
- Release date: 30 August 2016
- Running time: 10 minutes
- Country: Italy
- Language: Italian

Well Done (Italian: A Regola d'Arte) is a 2016 Italian dramatic short film directed by Riccardo Di Gerlando.

== Synopsis ==
A young man with Down syndrome goes to visit an art museum and will be fascinated by a symbolic picture.

== Awards ==
Well Done has been screened in over 20 film festivals worldwide. It won the following awards:

- Best Movie Bluenose Ability Film Festival (BAFF) – Halifax, Nova Scotia (Canada)
- Best Movie Kids Section XI° Edizione Corto Villese – (Bergamo, Italia)
- Best Story Corto Corrente Festival – Fiumicino (Roma, Italia)
- Best Scenography Festival del Cinema Nuovo – Gorgonzola (Milano, Italia)
- Best Movie Zero Budget NOFI International Film Festival – Glendale (California, USA)
- Audience Award CineGiovani e Adulti Film Festival – Treppo Carnico (Udine, Italia)
- 2° Place International Independent FF Publicystyka – Kędzierzyn-Koźle (Poland)
- 2° Place Francavilla Film Festival – Francavilla by Sicilia (Messina, Italia)
- 3° Place Gioiosa in Corto – Gioiosa Marea (Messina, Italia)
- National Award Alberto Andronico – Roma (Italia)
- Special Mention YouTube Short Film Festival – Roma (Italia)
