= Francisco González (footballer, born 2001) =

Argentine professional footballer

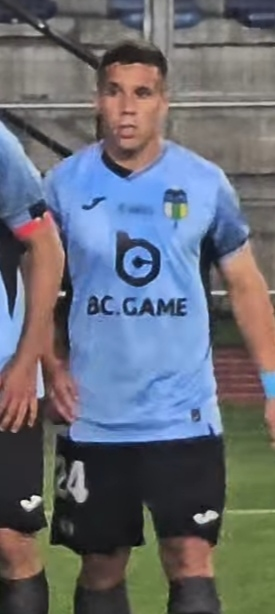
- González with O'Higgins in 2025

Personal information
- Full name: Francisco Agustín González
- Date of birth: 6 April 2001 (age 25)
- Place of birth: Ordóñez, Argentina
- Height: 1.70 m (5 ft 7 in)
- Position: Left winger

Team information
- Current team: Tijuana
- Number: 11

Youth career
- Sportivo Unión Ordóñez
- 2012–2019: Newell's Old Boys

Senior career*
Years	Team	Apps	(Gls)
2019–2025	Newell's Old Boys	96	(7)
2025	Defensa y Justicia	15	(1)
2025–2026	O'Higgins	36	(11)
2026–	Tijuana	9	(1)

International career
2019	Argentina U18	4	(1)
- * Club domestic league appearances and goals as of 26 October 2026

Francisco Agustín González (born 6 April 2001) is an Argentine professional footballer who plays as a left winger for Liga MX club Tijuana.

== Club career ==
González was produced by the Newell's Old Boys youth system, having also played for Malvinas Argentinas and Sportivo Unión Ordóñez at youth level. It was manager Héctor Bidoglio who promoted the forward into the club's senior set-up, as he was selected to start a Copa de la Superliga first round fixture with Gimnasia y Esgrima on 21 April 2019; he played sixty-nine minutes of a second leg home defeat as they were eliminated on aggregate.

In January 2025, González signed for Defensa y Justicia. In July of the same year, he moved abroad and joined O'Higgins on a deal until the 2028 season.

In July 2026, González moved to Mexico and joined Tijuana.

== International career ==
From 2018, González received call-ups from the Argentina U20s; including for friendlies in Murcia, Spain in 2019. He was selected to return to Spain with the Argentina U18s in July 2019, as he made the twenty-two man list for the L'Alcúdia International Tournament. He scored on his fourth competition appearance, netting in a five-goal victory over Bahrain on 6 August.

== Career statistics ==
As of 7 August 2019.

Appearances and goals by club, season and competition
Club	Season	League			Cup		League Cup		Continental		Other		Total	
Club	Season	Division	Apps	Goals	Apps	Goals	Apps	Goals	Apps	Goals	Apps	Goals	Apps	Goals
Newell's Old Boys	2018–19	Primera División	0	0	0	0	1	0	—		0	0	1	0
Newell's Old Boys	2019–20	Primera División	0	0	0	0	0	0	—		0	0	0	0
Career total			0	0	0	0	1	0	—		0	0	1	0
