= Nahuel Cisneros =

Argentine professional footballer

Personal information
- Full name: Nahuel Juan Adolfo Cisneros
- Date of birth: 17 February 1998 (age 28)
- Place of birth: Lomas de Zamora, Argentina
- Height: 1.72 m (5 ft 8 in)
- Position: Attacking midfielder

Youth career
- 2006–2018: Boca Juniors
- 2016–2017: → Villarreal (loan)
- 2017–2018: → Defensa y Justicia (loan)
- 2018–2019: Newell's Old Boys

Senior career*
Years	Team	Apps	(Gls)
2019–2020	Newell's Old Boys	0	(0)
2019	→ Náutico (loan)	3	(0)
2021	Parnahyba	10	(0)
2021	Real Potosí	12	(0)
2022	Universitario de Sucre	0	(0)
2022	Esperanza SC Yokohama	10	(0)
2023	San José		
- * Club domestic league appearances and goals as of 25 September 2022

Nahuel Juan Adolfo Cisneros (born 17 February 1998) is an Argentine professional footballer who plays as an attacking midfielder.

== Career ==
Cisneros began in 2006 with Boca Juniors, where he'd be loaned out on two occasions to Villarreal and Defensa y Justicia. He joined Newell's Old Boys in 2018. On 28 January 2019, Cisneros completed a loan move to Campeonato Brasileiro Série C side Náutico. He made his professional debut on 30 January 2019 in a Campeonato Pernambucano victory over Petrolina. He appeared once more in the competition against Sport Recife, in what was the second leg of the final; which they lost. In May, Cisneros appeared in the Copa do Nordeste versus Campinense, prior to featuring in Série C in a win over Imperatriz on 4 May.

Cisneros returned to Newell's in June 2019, having suffered continuous problems related to a shoulder injury; the loan had initially been set until 30 October 2019.

== Career statistics ==
As of 3 January 2021.

Appearances and goals by club, season and competition
Club	Season	League			State League		Cup		League Cup		Continental		Other		Total	
Club	Season	Division	Apps	Goals	Apps	Goals	Apps	Goals	Apps	Goals	Apps	Goals	Apps	Goals	Apps	Goals
Newell's Old Boys	2018–19	Primera División	0	0	—		0	0	0	0	—		0	0	0	0
Newell's Old Boys	2019–20	Primera División	0	0	—		0	0	0	0	—		0	0	0	0
Newell's Old Boys	2020–21 (Note: Soccerway counts Copa de la Liga Profesional appearances as league appearances.)	Primera División	0	0	—		0	0	0	0	—		0	0	0	0
Newell's Old Boys	Total		0	0	—		0	0	0	0	—		0	0	0	0
Náutico (loan)	2019	Série C	1	0	2	0	0	0	—		—		2 (Note: Appearance(s) in the Copa do Nordeste)	0	5	0
Career total			1	0	2	0	0	0	0	0	—		2	0	5	0
