= Ligosullo =

- Frazione
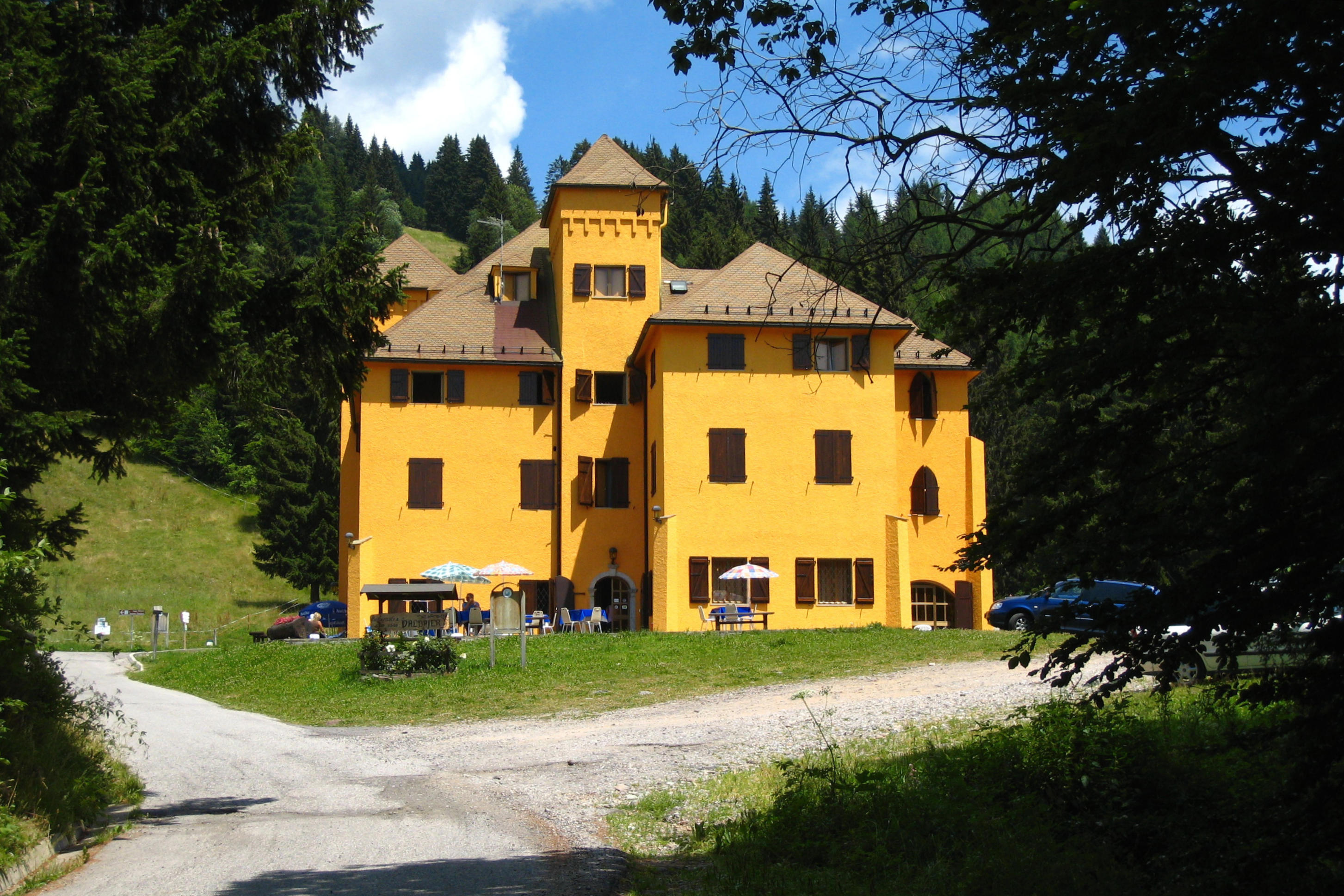
- Castle Valdajer in Ligosullo

- Location of Ligosullo in Italy
- Coordinates: 46°32′N 13°5′E
- Country: Italy
- Region: Friuli-Venezia Giulia
- Province: Udine (UD)
- Comune: Treppo Ligosullo

Population (Dec. 2004)
  - Total: 201
- Time zone: UTC+1 (CET)
  - Summer (DST): UTC+2 (CEST)
- Postal code: 33020
- Dialing code: 0433

Ligosullo is a frazione of Treppo Ligosullo in the Province of Udine in the Italian region Friuli-Venezia Giulia, located about 110 kilometres (68 mi) northwest of Trieste and about 50 kilometres (31 mi) north of Udine. It was a separate comune until February 1 2018, when it was merged with Treppo Carnico, which created the Treppo Ligosullo comune.
