= Cristian Lema =

Argentine footballer (born 1990)

Personal information
- Full name: Cristian Franco Lema
- Date of birth: 24 March 1990 (age 36)
- Place of birth: Puerto Madryn, Argentina
- Height: 1.91 m (6 ft 3 in)
- Position: Centre-back

Youth career
- 1998–2009: Guillermo Brown

Senior career*
Years	Team	Apps	(Gls)
2007–2009	Guillermo Brown		
2010–2012	Newell's Old Boys	12	(0)
2011–2012	→ Tigre (loan)	8	(0)
2012–2014	Quilmes	38	(2)
2014–2018	Belgrano	106	(16)
2018–2020	Benfica	1	(0)
2019	→ Peñarol (loan)	13	(2)
2019–2020	→ Newell's Old Boys (loan)	22	(5)
2020	Damac	11	(0)
2021–2022	Newell's Old Boys	57	(3)
2023–2024	Lanús	37	(1)
2024–2026	Boca Juniors	24	(1)
- * Club domestic league appearances and goals as of 12:48, 8 March 2026 (UTC)

Cristian Franco Lema (born 24 March 1990) is an Argentine former professional footballer who last played as a centre-back for Boca Juniors.

== Club career ==
Born in Puerto Madryn, Lema started his football career aged 8 at hometown club Guillermo Brown. He debuted for their senior team in 2007 and left the club in 2009.

A year later, Lema joined Newell's Old Boys and made his Argentine Primera División debut in a 0–0 home draw to Godoy Cruz in November. After playing 12 matches with the former side, he moved on loan to Tigre in June 2011, and there he played 11 matches, scoring one goal. In July 2012, aged 22, he transferred to Quilmes, with whom he would play 40 matches and score 2 goals before moving to Belgrano in 2014. In his four-year spell with the latter, he became the club's defender with the most league goals ever, 16 in 123 matches. Moreover, he debuted in Copa Sudamericana in 2015.

In June 2018, Lema moved to Portugal and signed a five-year contract with S.L. Benfica. In February 2019, after playing only two matches for the Lisbon side in October, he was loaned to Uruguayan club Peñarol until June 2019, with option to buy. Afterwards, he was loaned out to Newell's Old Boys for 2019–20. He left Benfica on 1 October 2020 to join Saudi Arabian club Damac FC.

On 18 February 2021, Lema returned to Newell's Old Boys, and signed a contract until December 2021.

In November 2022, Lema joined fellow Primera División club Lanús ahead of the 2023 season.

On 8 January 2024, Lema moved to Boca Juniors for a reported fee of $500.000, signing a two-year contract. After the expiration of the contract, Lema retired from the sport.

== Career statistics ==
As of match played 11 November 2023

Appearances and goals by club, season and competition
Club	Season	League			Cup		Continental		Total	
Club	Season	Division	Apps	Goals	Apps	Goals	Apps	Goals	Apps	Goals
Newell's Old Boys	2010–11	Argentine Primera División	12	0	—		—		12	0
Tigre (loan)	2011–12	Argentine Primera División	8	0	3	1	0	0	11	1
Quilmes	2012–13	Argentine Primera División	15	0	2	0	—		17	0
Quilmes	2013–14	Argentine Primera División	23	2	0	0	—		23	2
Quilmes	Total		38	2	2	0	—		40	2
Belgrano	2014	Argentine Primera División	18	0	—		—		18	0
Belgrano	2015	Argentine Primera División	28	2	1	0	2 (Note: Appearances in Copa Sudamericana)	0	31	2
Belgrano	2016	Argentine Primera División	14	3	5	0	4	0	23	3
Belgrano	2016–17	Argentine Primera División	21	3	2	0	—		23	3
Belgrano	2017–18	Argentine Primera División	25	8	0	0	—		25	8
Belgrano	Total		106	16	8	0	6	0	120	16
Benfica	2018–19	Primeira Liga	1	0	0	0	1 (Note: Appearance in UEFA Champions League)	0	2	0
Peñarol (loan)	2019	Uruguayan Primera División	13	2	—		7 (Note: Five appearances and one goal in Copa Libertadores, two appearances in Copa Sudamericana)	1	20	3
Newell's Old Boys (loan)	2019–20	Argentine Primera División	22	5	0	0	—		22	5
Damac	2020–21	Saudi Pro League	11	0	0	0	—		11	0
Newell's Old Boys	2021	Argentine Primera División	28	1	1	0	4	0	33	1
Newell's Old Boys	2022	Argentine Primera División	29	2	1	1	—		30	3
Newell's Old Boys	Total		57	3	2	1	4	0	63	4
Lanús	2023	Argentine Primera División	37	1	2	1	—		39	2
Boca Juniors	2024	Argentine Primera División	0	0	0	0	—		0	0
Career total			305	29	17	3	18	1	340	33

== Honours ==
Benfica

- Primeira Liga: 2018–19

=== Individual ===
- Argentine Primera División Team of the Season: 2023
