= Matías Orihuela =

Argentine footballer

Personal information
- Full name: Matías Exequiel Orihuela Bonino
- Date of birth: 17 February 1992 (age 34)
- Place of birth: Córdoba, Argentina
- Height: 1.78 m (5 ft 10 in)
- Position: Left-back

Team information
- Current team: San Martín SJ
- Number: 39

Youth career
- Instituto

Senior career*
| Years | Team | Apps | (Gls) |
| 2012–2014 | Deportivo Morón | 34 | (0) |
| 2014–2015 | Estudiantes | 2 | (0) |
| 2016–2017 | Quilmes | 33 | (2) |
| 2017 | Tigre | 2 | (0) |
| 2018 | Temperley | 8 | (0) |
| 2018–2019 | Apollon Smyrnis | 20 | (0) |
| 2019–2021 | Newell's Old Boys | 5 | (0) |
| 2021–2025 | Atlético Tucumán | 106 | (2) |
| 2025– | San Martín SJ | 9 | (0) |
- * Club domestic league appearances and goals as of 17:02, 23 November 2025 (UTC)

Matías Exequiel Orihuela Bonino (born 17 February 1992) is an Argentine professional footballer who plays as a left-back for San Martín SJ.

== Career ==
Orihuela played for Instituto at youth level. He got his career underway with Deportivo Morón in 2012. He made his professional debut in Primera B Metropolitana against Central Córdoba on 30 October, which was the first of thirty-five total appearances across the 2012–13 and 2013–14 seasons in all competitions. Estudiantes completed the signing of Orihuela on 7 July 2014. However, he departed the club less than two years later after featuring in just two first-team fixtures. January 2016 saw Orihuela join fellow Primera División side Quilmes. He scored his first senior goal in his second match, netting versus San Lorenzo on 20 March at home.

He remained with Quilmes until mid-2017, when he departed following their relegation to Primera B Nacional; subsequently signing for Tigre. He played in two games in the first part of 2017–18 with Tigre, facing Chacarita Juniors and Temperley; a team who then signed Orihuela in January 2018. A Temperley debut at La Bombonera against Boca Juniors on 11 February was followed by seven further appearances in a season that ended with the club being relegated. On 18 August 2018, Orihuela joined Super League Greece club Apollon Smyrnis. He appeared twenty times as they were relegated with just ten points; his last game was against Lamia.

On 22 July 2019, Newell's Old Boys announced terms had been agreed with Orihuela. After going unused on the substitute's bench for four matches across the next seven months, his debut belatedly arrived on 28 February 2020 as he played the full duration of an away draw with Racing Club. His next appearance would come almost twelve months later, as he came off the bench in a home loss to Boca Juniors on 21 February 2021.

In July 2021, Orihuela moved to fellow league club Atlético Tucumán on a deal until the end of 2022. Ahead of the 2022 season, Orihuela was - however - relegated to the reserve squad, as he wasn't a part of the club's plans.

On 9 July 2025, Orihuela left Atlético Tucumán after 4 years to join San Martín SJ, signing a contract until the end of 2026.

== Career statistics ==
As of 25 February 2021.

Club statistics
| Club | Season | League | | | Cup | | League Cup | | Continental | | Other | | Total | |
| Club | Season | Division | Apps | Goals | Apps | Goals | Apps | Goals | Apps | Goals | Apps | Goals | Apps | Goals |
|---|---|---|---|---|---|---|---|---|---|---|---|---|---|---|
| Deportivo Morón | 2012–13 | Primera B Metropolitana | 9 | 0 | 0 | 0 | — | | — | | 0 | 0 | 9 | 0 |
| Deportivo Morón | 2013–14 | Primera B Metropolitana | 25 | 0 | 1 | 0 | — | | — | | 0 | 0 | 26 | 0 |
| Deportivo Morón | Total | | 34 | 0 | 1 | 0 | — | | — | | 0 | 0 | 35 | 0 |
| Estudiantes | 2014 | Primera División | 2 | 0 | 0 | 0 | — | | 0 | 0 | 0 | 0 | 2 | 0 |
| Estudiantes | 2015 | Primera División | 0 | 0 | 0 | 0 | — | | 0 | 0 | 0 | 0 | 0 | 0 |
| Estudiantes | Total | | 2 | 0 | 0 | 0 | — | | 0 | 0 | 0 | 0 | 2 | 0 |
| Quilmes | 2016 | Primera División | 5 | 1 | 0 | 0 | — | | — | | 0 | 0 | 5 | 1 |
| Quilmes | 2016–17 | Primera División | 28 | 1 | 1 | 1 | — | | — | | 0 | 0 | 29 | 2 |
| Quilmes | Total | | 33 | 2 | 1 | 1 | — | | — | | 0 | 0 | 34 | 3 |
| Tigre | 2017–18 | Primera División | 2 | 0 | 0 | 0 | — | | — | | 0 | 0 | 2 | 0 |
| Temperley | 2017–18 | Primera División | 8 | 0 | 0 | 0 | — | | — | | 0 | 0 | 8 | 0 |
| Apollon Smyrnis | 2018–19 | Super League Greece | 20 | 0 | 1 | 0 | — | | — | | 0 | 0 | 21 | 0 |
| Newell's Old Boys | 2019–20 | Primera División | 1 | 0 | 0 | 0 | 0 | 0 | — | | 0 | 0 | 1 | 0 |
| Newell's Old Boys | 2020–21 (Note: Soccerway counts 2020 Copa de la Liga Profesional appearances as league appearances.) | Primera División | 0 | 0 | 0 | 0 | 0 | 0 | — | | 0 | 0 | 0 | 0 |
| Newell's Old Boys | 2021 (Note: Soccerway counts 2021 Copa de la Liga Profesional appearances as league appearances.) | Primera División | 1 | 0 | 0 | 0 | — | | — | | 0 | 0 | 1 | 0 |
| Newell's Old Boys | Total | | 2 | 0 | 0 | 0 | 0 | 0 | — | | 0 | 0 | 2 | 0 |
| Career total | | | 101 | 2 | 3 | 1 | 0 | 0 | 0 | 0 | 0 | 0 | 104 | 3 |
