= Joel Amoroso =

Argentine professional footballer

Personal information
- Full name: Emanuel Joel Amoroso
- Date of birth: 8 January 1988 (age 38)
- Place of birth: Rosario, Argentina
- Height: 1.83 m (6 ft 0 in)
- Position: Right midfielder

Team information
- Current team: Always Ready
- Number: 7

Youth career
- Centenario de Venado Tuerto

Senior career*
Years	Team	Apps	(Gls)
2010	Sportivo Rivadavia	0	(0)
2011–2012	Jorge Newbery Venado Tuerto	42	(11)
2012–2013	Ferro Carril Oeste	19	(0)
2013–2014	Unión Mar del Plata	42	(8)
2015–2016	Olimpo	42	(4)
2016–2019	Newell's Old Boys	36	(1)
2017–2018	→ Belgrano (loan)	16	(1)
2019	San Luis	12	(2)
2019–2020	Melgar	41	(7)
2021–2023	Royal Pari	92	(19)
2024–2025	The Strongest	59	(8)
2026–	Always Ready	4	(0)
- * Club domestic league appearances and goals as of 30 December 2025

Emanuel Joel Amoroso (born 8 January 1988) is an Argentine professional footballer who plays as a right midfielder for Bolivian club Always Ready.

== Career ==
Amoroso had a youth spell with Centenario de Venado Tuerto, before beginning his senior career in Torneo Argentino C with Sportivo Rivadavia. In 2011, Amoroso joined fellow Torneo Argentino C team Jorge Newbery. He scored four goals in eighteen matches in his first season, which ended with promotion to Torneo Argentino B. After twenty-four appearances and seven goals in Torneo Argentino B, Amoroso was signed by Primera B Nacional's Ferro Carril Oeste in June 2012. A goalless tie with Olimpo on 13 August saw him make his professional debut, which was the first of nineteen matches for the club throughout 2012–13.

On 21 July 2013, Amoroso joined Unión Mar del Plata of Torneo Argentino A. He went on to scored nine times in forty-three games for Unión Mar del Plata over the course of 2013–14 and 2014. In January 2015, Argentine Primera División side Olimpo signed Amoroso. He made his debut on 7 March against Rosario Central, prior to scoring his first two goals in November during matches versus Banfield and Quilmes. On 6 July 2016, Amoroso signed for fellow top-flight club Newell's Old Boys. One goal in twenty-eight appearances followed, which preceded Amoroso departing on loan in September 2017 to Belgrano.

Amoroso scored his first goal for Belgrano on 17 November, netting an 89th-minute winner away to parent club Newell's Old Boys. He returned to them in June 2018, prior to terminating his contract in the succeeding February to subsequently join San Luis. Amoroso remained for seven months, notching goals against Deportes Melipilla and Deportes Valdivia in the process. On 6 July, Amoroso switched Chile for Peru by agreeing terms with Melgar.

== Career statistics ==
As of 9 July 2019.

Club statistics
Club	Season	League			Cup		Continental		Other		Total	
Club	Season	Division	Apps	Goals	Apps	Goals	Apps	Goals	Apps	Goals	Apps	Goals
Newell's Old Boys	2016–17	Argentine Primera División	26	1	1	0	—		0	0	27	1
Newell's Old Boys	2017–18	Argentine Primera División	1	0	0	0	0	0	0	0	1	0
Newell's Old Boys	2018–19	Argentine Primera División	9	0	3	0	—		0	0	12	0
Newell's Old Boys	Total		36	1	4	0	0	0	0	0	40	1
Belgrano (loan)	2017–18	Argentine Primera División	16	1	1	0	—		0	0	17	1
San Luis	2019	Primera B	12	2	0	0	—		0	0	12	2
Melgar	2019	Peruvian Primera División	0	0	0	0	—		0	0	0	0
Career total			64	4	5	0	0	0	0	0	69	4
