= Stefano Callegari (footballer) =

Argentine professional footballer

Personal information
- Full name: Stefano Callegari
- Date of birth: 6 January 1997 (age 29)
- Place of birth: Rosario, Argentina
- Height: 1.88 m (6 ft 2 in)
- Position: Centre-back

Team information
- Current team: Nueva Chicago
- Number: 2

Youth career
- Newell's Old Boys

Senior career*
| Years | Team | Apps | (Gls) |
| 2017–2023 | Newell's Old Boys | 15 | (0) |
| 2020–2021 | → Platense (loan) | 14 | (0) |
| 2022 | → Agropecuario (loan) | 26 | (0) |
| 2023 | → Aldosivi (loan) | 25 | (0) |
| 2024– | Nueva Chicago | 52 | (2) |
- * Club domestic league appearances and goals as of 18:04, 19 June 2025 (UTC)

Stefano Callegari (born 6 January 1997) is an Argentine professional footballer who plays as a centre-back for Nueva Chicago.

== Career ==
Callegari's career got underway with Newell's Old Boys. After appearing on the first-team substitutes bench in December 2017 versus Rosario Central, Callegari featured in his first professional match four months later during a home victory over Tigre on 31 March 2018.

== Career statistics ==
As of 24 September 2018.

Club statistics
| Club | Season | League | | | Cup (Note: Includes the Copa Argentina) | | League Cup | | Continental (Note: Includes the Copa Sudamericana) | | Other | | Total | |
| Club | Season | Division | Apps | Goals | Apps | Goals | Apps | Goals | Apps | Goals | Apps | Goals | Apps | Goals |
|---|---|---|---|---|---|---|---|---|---|---|---|---|---|---|
| Newell's Old Boys | 2017–18 | Primera División | 1 | 0 | 0 | 0 | — | | 0 | 0 | 0 | 0 | 1 | 0 |
| Newell's Old Boys | 2018–19 | Primera División | 3 | 0 | 2 | 0 | — | | — | | 0 | 0 | 5 | 0 |
| Career total | | | 4 | 0 | 2 | 0 | — | | 0 | 0 | 0 | 0 | 6 | 0 |
