= Héctor Fértoli =

Argentine footballer

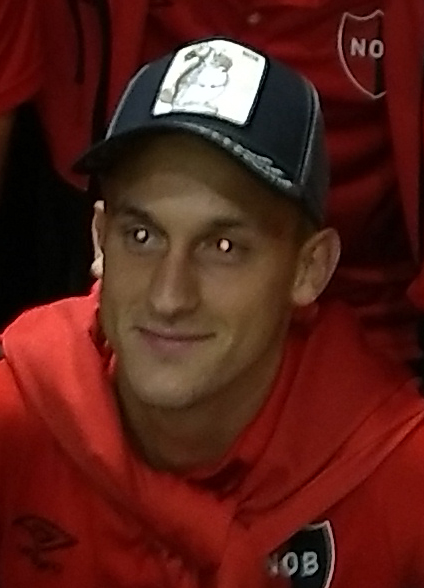

Personal information
- Full name: Héctor Hugo Fértoli
- Date of birth: 3 December 1994 (age 31)
- Place of birth: El Trébol, Argentina
- Height: 1.74 m (5 ft 9 in)
- Position: Left winger

Team information
- Current team: Universitario (on loan from Racing Club)
- Number: 8

Youth career
- Newell's Old Boys

Senior career*
Years	Team	Apps	(Gls)
2014–2019	Newell's Old Boys	59	(11)
2019–2020	San Lorenzo	12	(0)
2020–	Racing Club	19	(4)
2021–2022	→ Talleres (loan)	44	(2)
2023–2024	→ Huracán (loan)	50	(4)
2025	→ Tigre (loan)	16	(1)
2026–	→ Universitario (loan)	8	(0)
- * Club domestic league appearances and goals as of 18:55, 17 March 2026 (UTC)

Héctor Hugo Fértoli (born 3 December 1994) is an Argentine professional footballer who plays as a left winger for Universitario, on loan from Racing Club.

== Career ==
Fértoli first appeared in the first-team of Argentine Primera División side Newell's Old Boys during the 2013–14 campaign, he was an unused substitute for a 3–2 defeat to Arsenal de Sarandí on 4 May 2014. He made his professional debut in February 2016 against Rosario Central, before scoring his first goal two appearances later in a 1–0 win over Huracán. In his first two seasons, Fértoli made twenty-two appearances and scored five goals for Newell's Old Boys. In January 2019, Fértoli completed a move to San Lorenzo for $1.6m; signing until June 2020.

== Career statistics ==
As of 15 January 2019.

Club statistics
Club	Season	League			Cup		Continental		Other		Total	
Club	Season	Division	Apps	Goals	Apps	Goals	Apps	Goals	Apps	Goals	Apps	Goals
Newell's Old Boys	2013–14	Primera División	0	0	0	0	0	0	0	0	0	0
Newell's Old Boys	2014	Primera División	0	0	0	0	—		0	0	0	0
Newell's Old Boys	2015	Primera División	0	0	0	0	—		0	0	0	0
Newell's Old Boys	2016	Primera División	8	1	1	1	—		0	0	9	2
Newell's Old Boys	2016–17	Primera División	11	3	2	0	—		0	0	13	3
Newell's Old Boys	2017–18	Primera División	25	3	2	0	2 (Note: Appearance(s) in the Copa Sudamericana)	0	0	0	29	3
Newell's Old Boys	2018–19	Primera División	15	4	3	1	—		0	0	18	5
Newell's Old Boys	Total		59	11	8	2	2	0	0	0	69	13
San Lorenzo	2018–19	Primera División	0	0	0	0	0	0	0	0	0	0
Career total			59	11	8	2	2	0	0	0	69	13

== Honours ==
Racing Club

- 2022 Supercopa Internacional
