= Julián Fernández (footballer, born 1995) =

Argentine footballer (born 1995)

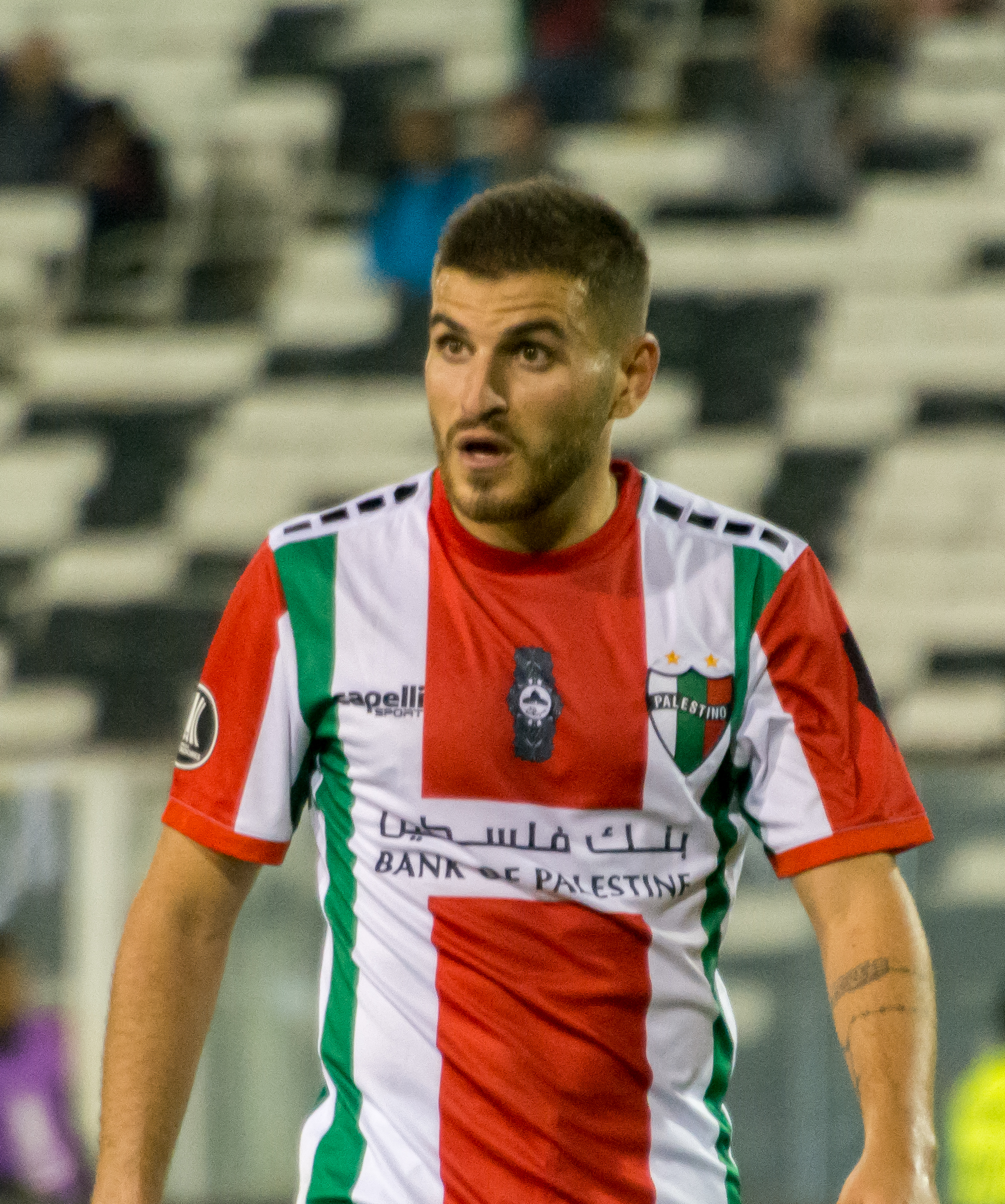
- Fernández with Palestino in 2019

Personal information
- Full name: Julián Rodrigo Fernández
- Date of birth: 22 March 1995 (age 31)
- Place of birth: Buenos Aires, Argentina
- Height: 1.80 m (5 ft 11 in)
- Position: Midfielder

Team information
- Current team: Atlético Tucumán (on loan from Palestino)
- Number: 5

Youth career
- Lanús

Senior career*
Years	Team	Apps	(Gls)
2013–2016	All Boys	74	(3)
2016–2018	Olimpo	12	(0)
2017–2018	→ Palestino (loan)	27	(2)
2018–2019	Palestino	23	(2)
2019–2024	Newell's Old Boys	97	(4)
2023	→ Lanús (loan)	27	(0)
2024	→ Sport Recife (loan)	12	(2)
2025–	Palestino	43	(1)
2026–	→ Atlético Tucumán (loan)	11	(0)
- * Club domestic league appearances and goals as of 17:30, 9 November 2026 (UTC)

Julián Rodrigo Fernández (born 22 March 1995) is an Argentine footballer who plays as a midfielder for Atlético Tucumán, on loan from Chilean Primera División club Palestino.

== Life and career ==
Fernández was born in Buenos Aires in 1995. His older brother Juan Manuel Fernández also became a footballer.

Fernández came through the youth system of the club he supported, All Boys, and made his senior debut on June 20, 2013, in the last 16 of the 2012–13 Copa Argentina, replacing Ivan Borghello after 81 minutes of a 3–1 win against Boca Juniors. His first Primera División appearance was also as a second-half substitute, in the final match of the 2012–13 season, a 4–0 defeat away to Arsenal de Sarandí. He played four times in the 2013–14 season, at the end of which All Boys were relegated, but appeared more frequently in the 2014 Primera B Nacional.

A proposed move to Primera club Olimpo de Bahía Blanca in January 2015 fell through when All Boys asked too high a fee. As Fernández established himself as a major player for All Boys, so the transfer rumours continued. In July 2015, a move to another Primera club, Independiente, seemed well on the way to completion. Still only 20 years old, Fernández captained All Boys in the 2016 season.

In June 2016, All Boys sold 80% of his economic rights to Olimpo. He had played 78 matches for the club in all competitions, and scored 3 goals. The player said the offer had come at the right time for him: although he loved All Boys and was grateful for their role in shaping him as a person as well as a player, he wanted to play at a higher level and his sale had brought much-needed finance into the club. He played little for Olimpo's first team – 12 appearances in the Primera, of which 7 starts – before he moved on again.

Needing to replace Agustín Farías, their captain who was moving to Europe, Chilean Primera División club Palestino signed Fernández on a six-month loan in June 2017; the deal included options to extend the loan for a further year or to purchase.

In 2025, Fernández returned to Palestino from Brazilian club Sport Recife. In July 2026, he was loaned out to Atlético Tucumán until the end of the year.
