= Ángelo Gabrielli =

Uruguayan footballer (born 1992)

Personal information
- Full name: Ángelo Emanuel Gabrielli Scarrone
- Date of birth: 23 September 1992 (age 34)
- Place of birth: Colonia 18 de Julio, Uruguay
- Height: 1.77 m (5 ft 10 in)
- Position: Right-back

Youth career
- Fénix

Senior career*
Years	Team	Apps	(Gls)
2013–2017	Fénix	53	(2)
2018	Liverpool	32	(4)
2019–2021	Newell's Old Boys	23	(2)
2021	Nacional	5	(0)
- * Club domestic league appearances and goals as of 17:05, 23 January 2022 (UTC)

Ángelo Emanuel Gabrielli Scarrone (born 23 September 1992) is a Uruguayan professional footballer who plays as a right-back.

== Career ==
Fénix were Gabrielli's first senior club. Having been moved into their senior team in the 2013–14 Uruguayan Primera División season, Gabrielli went unused on the substitute's bench four times before making his professional bow on 3 May 2014 at the Estadio Parque Capurro against Cerro Largo; Fénix ran out 5–1 winners. Thirteen appearances followed in each of the following three seasons, which preceded Gabrielli netting his first goal in a win over Plaza Colonia on 26 February 2017. January 2018 saw Gabrielli complete a move to fellow Uruguayan Primera División team Liverpool. Four goals in thirty-two games subsequently arrived.

On 4 January 2019, after departing Liverpool at the end of his contract, Gabrielli joined Newell's Old Boys of the Argentine Primera División.

In February 2021, Gabrielli returned to Uruguay when he joined Nacional. He left the club again at the end of the year.

== Career statistics ==
As of 5 January 2019.

Club statistics
Club	Season	League			Cup		Continental		Other		Total	
Club	Season	Division	Apps	Goals	Apps	Goals	Apps	Goals	Apps	Goals	Apps	Goals
Fénix	2013–14	Uruguayan Primera División	1	0	—		—		0	0	1	0
Fénix	2014–15	Uruguayan Primera División	13	0	—		—		0	0	13	0
Fénix	2015–16	Uruguayan Primera División	13	0	—		—		0	0	13	0
Fénix	2016	Uruguayan Primera División	13	0	—		2 (Note: Appearance(s) in the Copa Sudamericana)	0	0	0	15	0
Fénix	2017	Uruguayan Primera División	13	2	—		—		0	0	13	2
Fénix	Total		53	2	—		2	0	0	0	55	2
Liverpool	2018	Uruguayan Primera División	32	4	—		—		0	0	32	4
Newell's Old Boys	2018–19	Argentine Primera División	0	0	0	0	—		0	0	0	0
Career total			85	6	0	0	2	0	0	0	87	6
