= Juan Requena =

Argentine footballer

Personal information
- Full name: Juan Manuel Requena
- Date of birth: 24 January 1999 (age 27)
- Place of birth: Arroyo Cabral, Argentina
- Height: 1.78 m (5 ft 10 in)
- Position: Midfielder

Team information
- Current team: Universitario
- Number: 15

Youth career
- All Boys
- Rivadavia Arroyo Cabral
- 2012–2018: Newell's Old Boys

Senior career*
Years	Team	Apps	(Gls)
2018–2021	Newell's Old Boys	3	(0)
2020	→ Brown de Adrogué (loan)	9	(0)
2021	→ Estudiantes BA (loan)	0	(0)
2021	San Martín SJ	11	(0)
2022	Santamarina	6	(0)
2022–2023	San Telmo	51	(2)
2024	Atlanta	28	(2)
2025	Deportivo Táchira	21	(1)
2026	Unión La Calera	15	(0)
2026–	Universitario	0	(0)
- * Club domestic league appearances and goals as of 15 July 2026

Juan Manuel Requena (born 24 January 1999) is an Argentine professional footballer who plays as a midfielder for Peruvian club Universitario.

== Club career ==
Requena played for the youth systems of All Boys, Rivadavia Arroyo Cabral and, from 2012, Newell's Old Boys. He was moved into the senior set-up by caretaker boss Rubén Rodríguez in December 2018, appearing on the substitutes bench for Primera División fixtures with Patronato and San Martín; though went unused. Héctor Bidoglio, the club's subsequent full-time manager, selected Requena for his professional debut on 15 March 2019 during a defeat away to Gimnasia y Esgrima.

In 2026, Requena joined Chilean club Unión La Calera. In July of the same year, he ended his contract and switched to Peruvian club Universitario.

== International career ==
In August 2017, Requena received a call-up to train with Sebastián Beccacece's Argentina U20s.

== Career statistics ==
As of 15 March 2019.

Appearances and goals by club, season and competition
Club	Season	League			Cup		Continental		Other		Total	
Club	Season	Division	Apps	Goals	Apps	Goals	Apps	Goals	Apps	Goals	Apps	Goals
Newell's Old Boys	2018–19	Primera División	1	0	0	0	—		0	0	1	0
Career total			1	0	0	0	—		0	0	1	0
