= Mariano Bíttolo =

Argentine footballer

Personal information
- Date of birth: 24 April 1990 (age 36)
- Place of birth: Morón, Argentina
- Height: 1.75 m (5 ft 9 in)
- Position: Left-back

Team information
- Current team: Deportivo Morón

Youth career
- Vélez Sársfield

Senior career*
Years	Team	Apps	(Gls)
2009–2013	Vélez Sársfield	16	(0)
2013–2015	Colón	45	(1)
2015–2017	Atromitos	39	(0)
2017	Córdoba	15	(0)
2017–2020	Albacete	27	(0)
2018–2020	→ Newell's Old Boys (loan)	41	(0)
2020–2022	Newell's Old Boys	29	(0)
2022–2024	Argentinos Juniors	39	(0)
2024–	Deportivo Morón	41	(1)
- * Club domestic league appearances and goals as of 17:31, 27 April 2026 (UTC)

Mariano Bíttolo (born 24 April 1990) is an Argentine professional footballer who plays as a left-back for Deportivo Morón.

== Career ==
Bíttolo started his career at the age of 18 in Vélez Sársfield and since 2013 he played for Colón. After the loss of signing Kostas Giannoulis from Olympiakos, Atromitos decided to sign a two years' contract with Bíttolo.

On 28 October 2017, Bíttolo suffered a gruesome injury that required 10 stitches to his genital area after being struck by the studs of his teammate.

On 27 July 2018, Bíttolo returned to his homeland to sign for Newell's Old Boys on a one-year loan deal with a charge of $25,000 and an option to make the deal permanent. A year later, the loan deal was extended for one further year. in July 2020, Newell's triggered the option and signed Bíttolo on a deal until the end of 2023.

On 24 January 2022, Bíttolo joined fellow league club Argentinos Juniors on a deal until the end of 2023.

In December 2024, Bíttolo joined Primera Nacional club Deportivo Morón after almost a year without a club.

== Honours ==
Vélez Sársfield

- Argentine Primera División: 2009 Clausura, 2011 Clausura, 2012 Inicial
