= Daniel Opazo =

Argentine footballer

Personal information
- Full name: Daniel Hernán Opazo
- Date of birth: 8 November 1996 (age 30)
- Place of birth: Neuquén, Argentina
- Height: 1.78 m (5 ft 10 in)
- Position: Forward

Team information
- Current team: Deportes Puerto Montt
- Number: 9

Youth career
- Maronese
- Cipolletti

Senior career*
Years	Team	Apps	(Gls)
2015	25 de Mayo	9	(0)
2016–2017	Cipolletti	19	(4)
2017–2019	Newell's Old Boys	6	(0)
2018	→ San Martín SJ (loan)	0	(0)
2019	→ Cipolletti (loan)	12	(3)
2020	Cipolletti	7	(2)
2020–2021	Unión San Felipe	18	(1)
2021–2022	Deportivo Madryn	26	(2)
2022–	Deportes Puerto Montt	18	(1)
- * Club domestic league appearances and goals as of 14:31, 30 July 2023 (UTC)

Daniel Hernán Opazo (born 8 November 1996) is an Argentine professional footballer who plays as a forward for Deportes Puerto Montt.

== Career ==
Opazo had youth spells with Maronese and Cipolletti. His senior career started in 2015 with Torneo Federal B club 25 de Mayo, with whom he made nine appearances. In 2016, Opazo rejoined Cipolletti of Torneo Federal A. He made his debut in March 2016 against Independiente, later making four more appearances in 2016. In the following season, Opazo made sixteen appearances and scored six goals, including his career first versus Deportivo Madryn on 9 April 2017. On 16 July 2017, Opazo joined Primera División side Newell's Old Boys on a four-year contract. His pro league debut came in a draw with Unión Santa Fe.

Opazo was loaned to San Martín on 8 July 2018. He returned to Newell's Old Boys in December after no competitive matches for San Martín. Opazo subsequently signed for Cipolletti on loan in February 2019. Opazo returned to Newell's at the end of the year, as his contract there expired. In January 2020, Opazo rejoined Cipolletti on a free transfer. He was released during the COVID-19 pandemic, having scored a total of five goals in 2019–20.

On 24 October 2020, Opazo joined Chilean Primera B de Chile club Unión San Felipe. On 24 June 2022, he joined Deportes Puerto Montt.

== Career statistics ==
As of 8 July 2020.

Club statistics
Club	Season	League			Cup		League Cup		Continental		Other		Total	
Club	Season	Division	Apps	Goals	Apps	Goals	Apps	Goals	Apps	Goals	Apps	Goals	Apps	Goals
25 de Mayo	2015	Torneo Federal B	9	0	0	0	—		—		0	0	9	0
Cipolletti	2016	Torneo Federal A	5	0	0	0	—		—		0	0	5	0
Cipolletti	2016–17	Torneo Federal A	14	4	2	2	—		—		0	0	16	6
Cipolletti	Total		19	4	2	2	—		—		0	0	21	6
Newell's Old Boys	2017–18	Primera División	6	0	1	0	—		1 (Note: Appearance(s) in the Copa Sudamericana)	0	0	0	8	0
Newell's Old Boys	2018–19	Primera División	0	0	0	0	0	0	—		0	0	0	0
Newell's Old Boys	2019–20	Primera División	0	0	0	0	0	0	—		0	0	0	0
Newell's Old Boys	Total		6	0	1	0	0	0	1	0	0	0	8	0
San Martín (loan)	2018–19	Primera División	0	0	0	0	0	0	—		0	0	0	0
Cipolletti (loan)	2018–19	Torneo Federal A	2	0	—		—		—		0	0	2	0
Cipolletti (loan)	2019–20	Torneo Federal A	12	3	0	0	—		—		0	0	12	3
Cipolletti	2019–20	Torneo Federal A	7	2	1	0	—		—		0	0	8	2
Cipolletti	Total		21	5	1	0	—		0	0	0	0	22	5
Career total			34	4	4	2	—		1	0	0	0	39	6
