= Treppo Ligosullo =

Treppo Ligosullo Trèp Liussûl (Friulian)
- Comune
- (in Italian) Treppo Ligosullo (in Friulian)Trep di Cjargne Liussûl
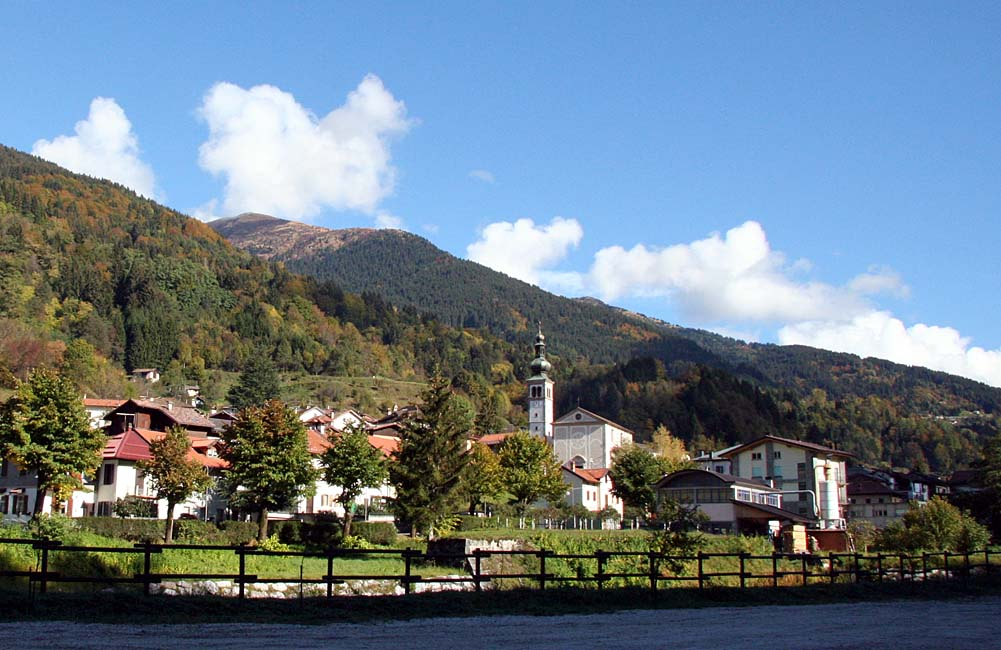
- Treppo Carnico

- Location of the municipality of Treppo Ligosullo in the former province of Udine

- Location within Italy Location within Friuli-Venezia Giulia
- Coordinates: 46°32′N 13°4′E
- Country: Italy
- Region: Friuli-Venezia Giulia
- Province: Udine (UD)
- Frazioni: Gleriis, Ligosullo, Murzalis, Siaio, Tausia, Treppo Carnico, Zenodis

Government
  - Mayor: Marco Plazzotta (Civic list)

Area
  - Total: 35.59 km^{2} (13.74 sq mi)
- Elevation: 671 m (2,201 ft)

Population (30 November 2025)
  - Total: 660
  - Density: 19/km^{2} (48/sq mi)
- Time zone: UTC+1 (CET)
  - Summer (DST): UTC+2 (CEST)
- Postal code: 31020
- Dialing code: 0433
- Patron saint: Saint Agnes (Treppo Carnico) San Nicolò (Ligosullo)
- Saint day: 21 January (Treppo Carnico), 6 December (Ligosullo)
- Website: Official website

Treppo Ligosullo (Friulian: Trèp Liussûl) is a comune (municipality) in the Regional decentralization entity of Udine in the Italian region of Friuli-Venezia Giulia. It was established on 1 February 2018 by the merger of Ligosullo and Treppo Carnico and the new municipality became operational the same day.

== Geography ==
The municipality of Treppo Ligosullo extends along the Pontaiba Valley, a tributary of the But River in Alta Carnia. It includes the towns of Treppo with its former hamlets of Zenodis, Siaio, Gleriis, and Tausia, and Ligosullo with its former hamlet of Murzalis. The municipality's altitude ranges from 670 meters at the main town to 2,046 meters at Mount Dimon.

== History ==
Following the October 2017 referendum, the new municipality of Treppo Ligosullo was established. The regional consultative referendum for the merger of the municipalities of Ligosullo and Treppo Carnico was held on October 29, 2017. The Yes vote prevailed in Treppo Carnico (67.95%), while the No vote prevailed in Ligosullo (53.26%). The highest voter turnout was recorded in Ligosullo with 71.88% of eligible voters, followed by Treppo Carnico with 50.90%.. The decision was ratified by the Regional Council of Friuli-Venezia Giulia following the presentation of Bill 178 on November 15, 2017.

== Symbols ==
The coat of arms of the municipality of Treppo Ligosullo was granted by decree of the President of the Republic on November 25, 2019.

== Monuments and places of Interest ==
=== Religious architecture ===
- Parish Church of Sant'Agnese in Treppo Carnico, is located in the centre of the town at a crossroads of streets that lead to the square.
- Church of the Blessed Virgin of Graces in Tausia.
- Parish Church of San Nicolò Bishop of Ligosullo.
- Chapel in the rectory in Treppo
- Chapel of the Emigrants in Murzalis

=== Civil architecture and museums ===
In Treppo Carnico:

- Enrico de Cillia Modern Art Gallery
- Treppo Carnico Town Hall.
- Cooperation Square.
- Monument to the Fallen of all Wars.

In Ligosullo:

- Valdajer Castle
- Hunting Reserve
- Ligosullo Town Hall
- Murals dedicated to Enzo Cainero in Piazza Barc
- Commemorative stone to Friulian emigrants around the world

In all the towns of the municipality, many ancient stone houses dating back to the 15th century are also visible.

== Society ==
=== Demographic evolution ===
Historical population

Year	Pop.	±%
1861	?	—
1871	1,774	—
1881	1,964	+10.7%
1901	2,009	+2.3%
1911	2,123	+5.7%
1921	2,189	+3.1%

Year	Pop.	±%
1931	1,741	−20.5%
1936	1,608	−7.6%
1951	1,841	+14.5%
1961	1,722	−6.5%
1971	1,259	−26.9%
1981	1,119	−11.1%

Year	Pop.	±%
1991	955	−14.7%
2001	855	−10.5%
2011	784	−8.3%
2021	682	−13.0%

Source: Data from ISTAT

=== Languages and Dialects ===
In Treppo Ligosullo, alongside Italian, the population speaks Friulian. Pursuant to Resolution No. 2680 of August 3, 2001, issued by the Regional Council of the Autonomous Region of Friuli-Venezia Giulia, the municipality is included in the territorial protection of the Friulian language for the purposes of the application of Law 482/99, Regional Law 15/96, and Regional Law 29/2007. The Friulian language spoken in Treppo Ligosullo is one of the variants belonging to Carnic Friulian.

== Culture ==
=== Media ===
Radio Tausia, a commercial radio station in the Upper Friuli region, was founded in the hamlet of Tausia in 2014 and was voted the best Internet radio in Italy in 2021. The television station operating in the municipality is VideoTeleCarnia, which streams live from its website and at certain times on Teleantenna.it - FVG channel 80 of digital terrestrial television.

== Administration ==
Period		Office holder	Party	Title	Notes
4 April 2023	in office	Marco Plazzotta	Lista civica	Mayor	

== Gallery ==
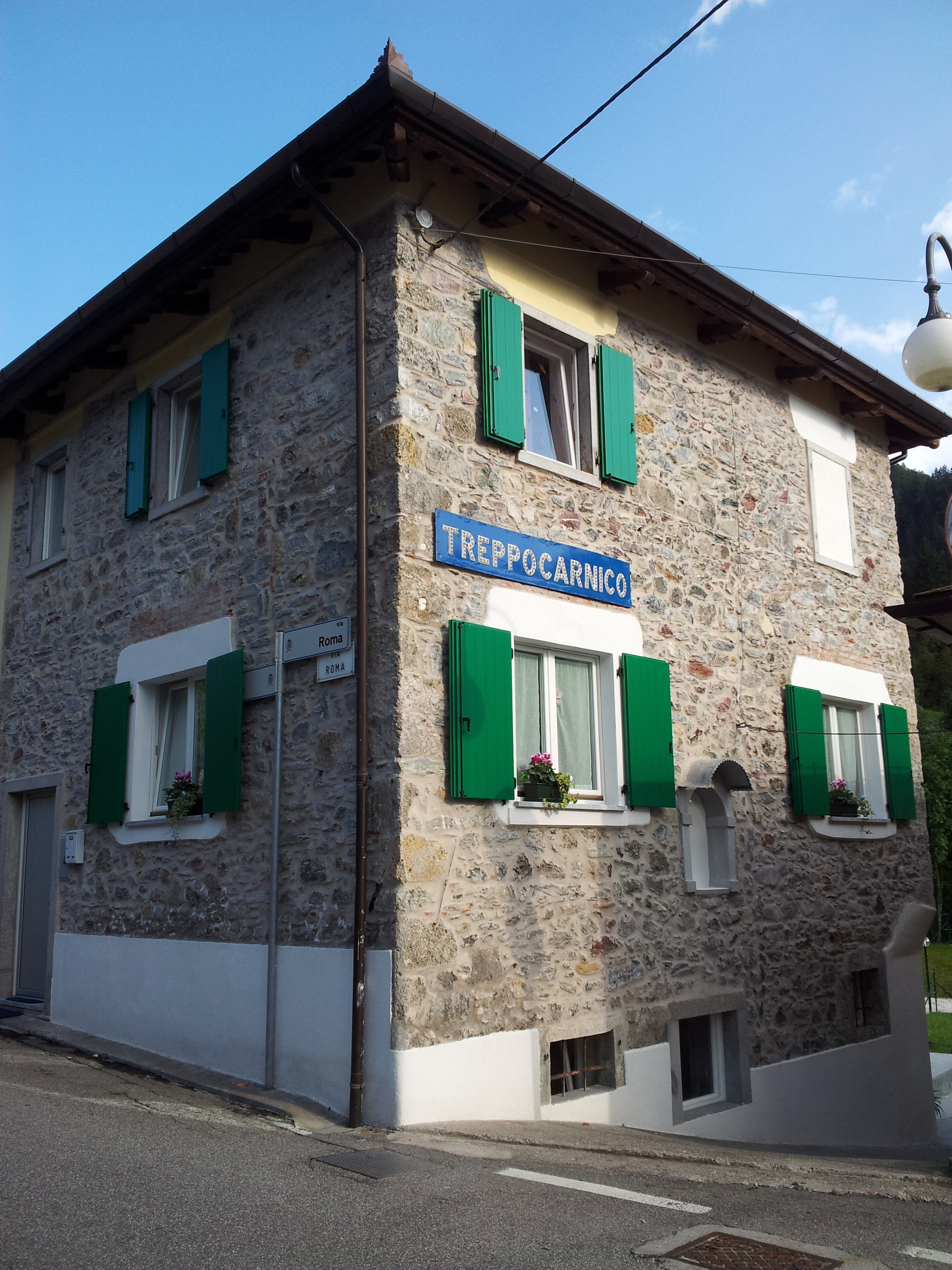
Toponymic table

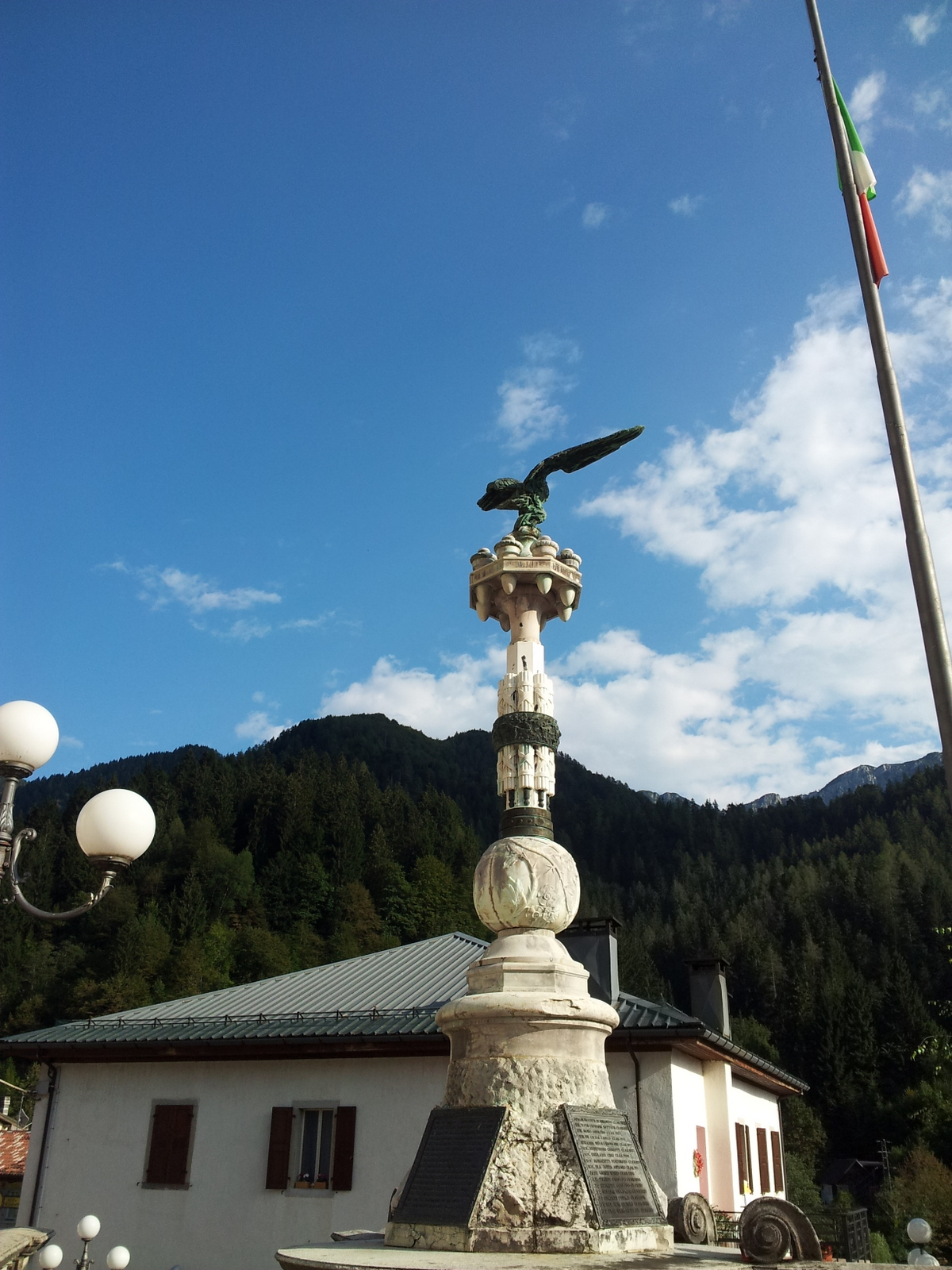
War memorial

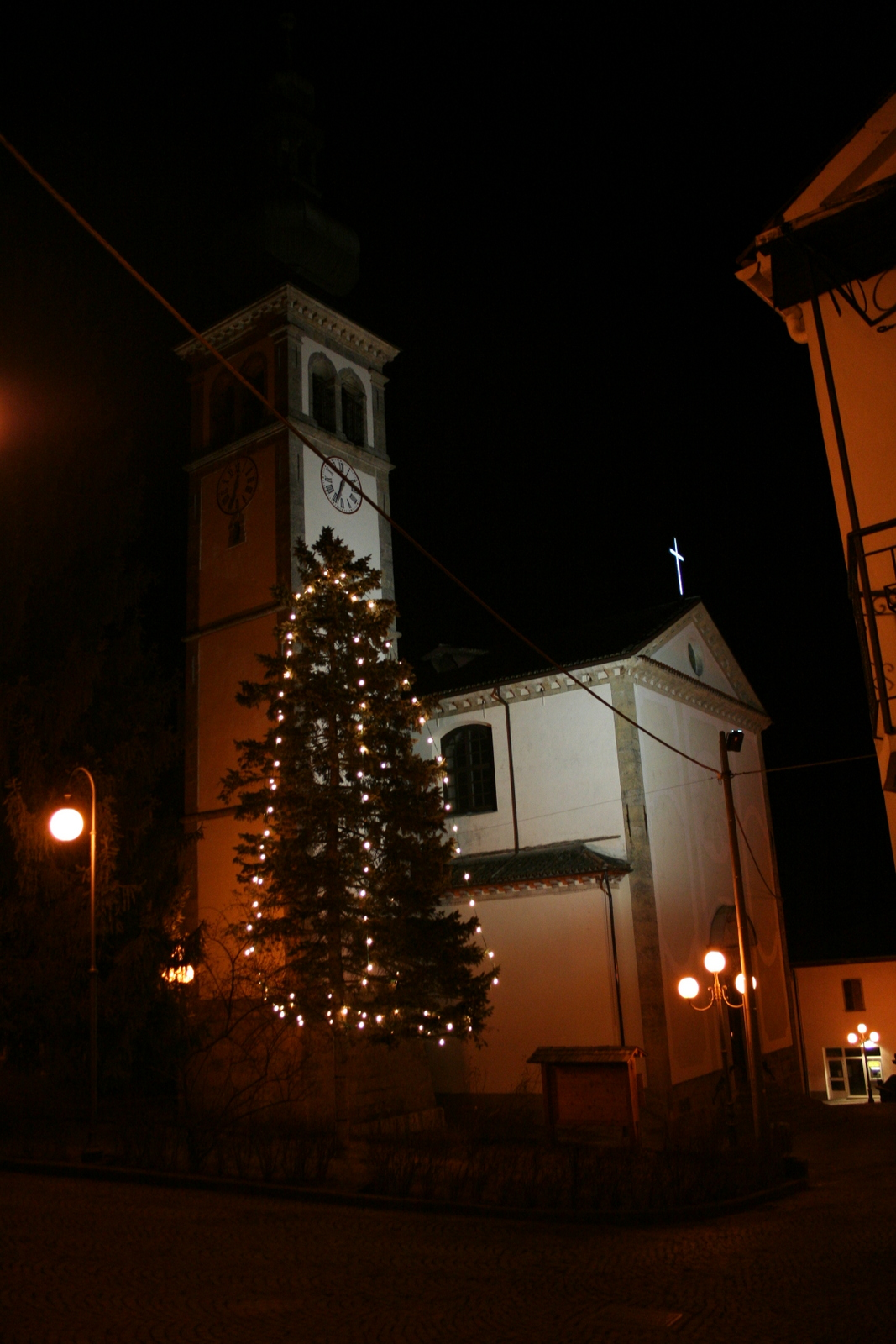
The Church of Sant'Agnese at Christmas

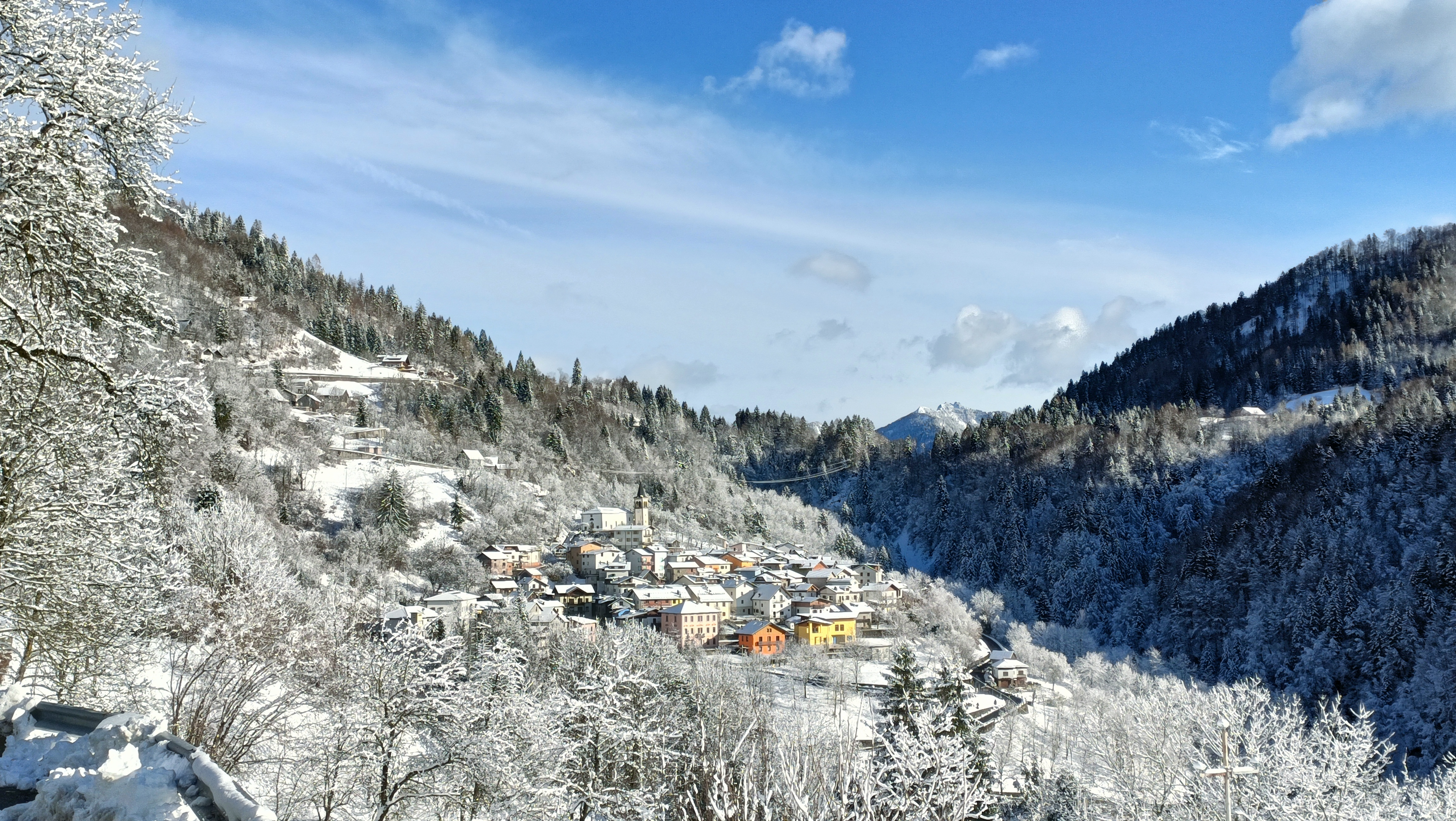
The hamlet of Ligosullo

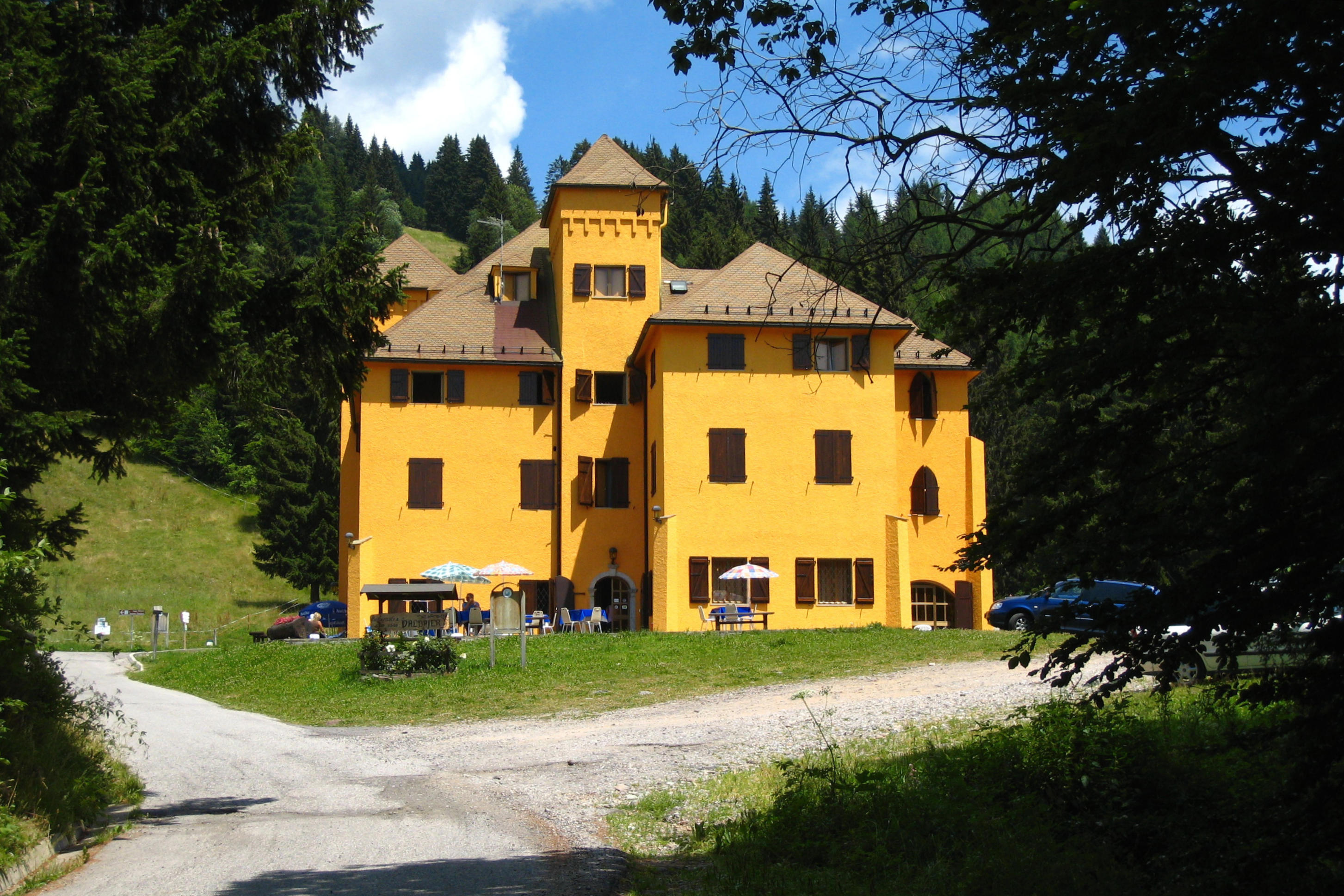
Castel Valdajer

== See also ==
- Carnia
