= Milton Treppo =

Argentine footballer (born 1996)

Personal information
- Full name: Milton Hernán Treppo
- Date of birth: 13 May 1996 (age 30)
- Place of birth: Pérez, Argentina
- Height: 1.78 m (5 ft 10 in)
- Position: Centre-forward

Youth career
- 2010–2017: Newell's Old Boys

Senior career*
Years	Team	Apps	(Gls)
2017–2018	Newell's Old Boys	2	(0)
2018	→ Racing de Córdoba (loan)	5	(0)
2019	9 de Julio (SF)		
2020	Central Córdoba	5	(0)
- * Club domestic league appearances and goals as of 13:04, 2 January 2021 (UTC)

Milton Hernán Treppo (born 13 May 1996) is an Argentine professional footballer who plays as a centre-forward.

== Career ==
Treppo started his career with Newell's Old Boys in 2010, with the forward appearing in their first-team squad during the 2017–18 Argentine Primera División season. He was an unused substitute in games against Olimpo and Lanús in September 2017, which preceded his professional debut arriving on 8 April 2018 during a home draw with Atlético Tucumán. Two further appearances followed in April, notably including his first appearance in the Copa Sudamericana against Atlético Paranaense on 12 April. Torneo Federal A side Racing de Córdoba completed the loan signing of Treppo in September.

In 2019, Treppo had a spell with 9 de Julio de Santa Fe. In 2020, Treppo headed to Primera C Metropolitana with Central Córdoba.

== Career statistics ==
As of 2 January 2021.

Club statistics
Club	Season	League			Cup		League Cup		Continental		Other		Total	
Club	Season	Division	Apps	Goals	Apps	Goals	Apps	Goals	Apps	Goals	Apps	Goals	Apps	Goals
Newell's Old Boys	2017–18	Primera División	2	0	0	0	—		1 (Note: Appearance(s) in the Copa Sudamericana)	0	0	0	3	0
Newell's Old Boys	2018–19	Primera División	0	0	0	0	—		0	0	0	0	0	0
Newell's Old Boys	Total		2	0	0	0	—		1	0	0	0	3	0
Racing de Córdoba (loan)	2018–19	Torneo Federal A	5	0	0	0	—		0	0	0	0	5	0
Central Córdoba	2020	Primera C Metropolitana	2	0	0	0	—		0	0	0	0	2	0
Career total			9	0	0	0	—		1	0	0	0	10	0
