= Ignacio Huguenet =

Argentine footballer

Personal information
- Full name: Ignacio Nicolás Huguenet
- Date of birth: 5 March 1998 (age 28)
- Place of birth: Rosario, Argentina
- Height: 1.87 m (6 ft 1 1/2 in)
- Position: Centre-forward

Team information
- Current team: Newell's Old Boys

Youth career
- Academia Griffa
- 2012–2017: Newell's Old Boys

Senior career*
Years	Team	Apps	(Gls)
2017–	Newell's Old Boys	1	(0)
2018–2019	→ Defensa y Justicia (loan)	8	(0)
2020	→ Sport Boys (loan)	23	(3)
2021	→ Instituto (loan)	21	(2)
- * Club domestic league appearances and goals as of 18:25, 25 July 2022 (UTC)

Ignacio Nicolás Huguenet (born 5 March 1998) is an Argentine professional footballer who plays as a centre-forward for Newell's Old Boys.

== Career ==
Huguenet's career began with Academia Griffa before joining Newell's Old Boys, firstly in the youth system from 2012 and then in the first-team from 2017. He was an unused substitute for a 2016–17 Primera División match with Olimpo in May 2017, prior to making his professional debut during 2017–18 when he was substituted on for the final six minutes in a 1–0 loss to Lanús on 25 September 2017. Huguenet was loaned to fellow Primera División side Defensa y Justicia in July 2018. He'd appear eight times for the Florencio Varela outfit, as they placed second; missing the title by four points.

In January 2020, Huguenet completed a loan move to Peruvian football with Primera División side Sport Boys. He made his debut in a 3–2 victory over Deportivo Llacuabamba on 2 February, having replaced Piero Ratto after sixty-six minutes. His first goal arrived during his first home start, as he netted a brace in a 3–3 draw against Universitario on 1 March. Another goal followed in November versus Universidad César Vallejo, as he made a total of twenty-three appearances. He announced his departure from Sport Boys at the conclusion of the 2020 campaign.

== Career statistics ==
As of 17 December 2020.

Club statistics
Club	Season	League			Cup		League Cup		Continental		Other		Total	
Club	Season	Division	Apps	Goals	Apps	Goals	Apps	Goals	Apps	Goals	Apps	Goals	Apps	Goals
Newell's Old Boys	2016–17	Argentine Primera División	0	0	0	0	—		—		0	0	0	0
Newell's Old Boys	2017–18	Argentine Primera División	1	0	0	0	—		0	0	0	0	1	0
Newell's Old Boys	2018–19	Argentine Primera División	0	0	0	0	0	0	—		0	0	0	0
Newell's Old Boys	2019–20	Argentine Primera División	0	0	0	0	0	0	—		0	0	0	0
Newell's Old Boys	2020–21	Argentine Primera División	0	0	0	0	0	0	—		0	0	0	0
Newell's Old Boys	Total		1	0	0	0	0	0	0	0	0	0	1	0
Defensa y Justicia (loan)	2018–19	Argentine Primera División	8	0	0	0	0	0	0	0	0	0	8	0
Sport Boys (loan)	2020	Peruvian Primera División	23	3	0	0	—		—		0	0	23	3
Career total			32	3	0	0	0	0	0	0	0	0	32	3
