= Maximiliano Pollacchi =

Argentine footballer

Personal information
- Full name: Maximiliano Iván Pollacchi
- Date of birth: 4 January 1995 (age 31)
- Place of birth: Rosario, Argentina
- Height: 1.84 m (6 ft 1/2 in)
- Position: Centre-back

Team information
- Current team: Sportivo Las Parejas

Youth career
- Newell's Old Boys

Senior career*
Years	Team	Apps	(Gls)
2012–2017	Newell's Old Boys	0	(0)
2017–2018	Colegiales	26	(0)
2018–2019	Central Córdoba	23	(0)
2019–2020	Sportivo Las Parejas	21	(3)
2020–2021	Villa Dálmine	40	(2)
2022–	Sportivo Las Parejas	21	(1)
- * Club domestic league appearances and goals as of 19:41, 15 August 2022 (UTC)

Maximiliano Iván Pollacchi (born 4 January 1995) is an Argentine professional footballer who plays as a centre-back for Sportivo Las Parejas.

== Career ==
Pollacchi began with Argentine Primera División side Newell's Old Boys. He first appeared on a first-team teamsheet for the club during the 2011–12 season, being unused for games against Banfield and Olimpo. He was an unused substitute twelve more times in all competitions for Newell's Old Boys between 2012 and 2014. On 30 June 2017, Pollacchi joined Colegiales of Primera B Metropolitana. His professional debut arrived on 24 September during a draw with Estudiantes. Central Córdoba became Pollacchi's third club in July 2018. Pollacchi made twenty-three appearances in one season in Primera C Metropolitana.

August 2019 saw Pollacchi head to Torneo Federal A with Sportivo Las Parejas. He scored goals against Central Norte, Sarmiento and San Martín de Formosa in a campaign that was ended early due to the COVID-19 pandemic. In September 2020, Pollacchi signed for Primera B Nacional's Villa Dálmine. Ahead of the 2022 season, Pollacchi returned to Sportivo Las Parejas.

== Career statistics ==
As of 28 October 2020.

Club statistics
Club	Season	League			Cup		League Cup		Continental		Other		Total	
Club	Season	Division	Apps	Goals	Apps	Goals	Apps	Goals	Apps	Goals	Apps	Goals	Apps	Goals
Newell's Old Boys	2011–12	Primera División	0	0	0	0	—		—		0	0	0	0
Newell's Old Boys	2012–13	Primera División	0	0	0	0	—		0	0	0	0	0	0
Newell's Old Boys	2013–14	Primera División	0	0	0	0	—		0	0	0	0	0	0
Newell's Old Boys	2014	Primera División	0	0	0	0	—		—		0	0	0	0
Newell's Old Boys	2015	Primera División	0	0	0	0	—		—		0	0	0	0
Newell's Old Boys	2016	Primera División	0	0	0	0	—		—		0	0	0	0
Newell's Old Boys	2016–17	Primera División	0	0	0	0	—		—		0	0	0	0
Newell's Old Boys	Total		0	0	0	0	—		—		0	0	0	0
Colegiales	2017–18	Primera B Metropolitana	26	0	0	0	—		—		0	0	26	0
Central Córdoba	2018–19	Primera C Metropolitana	23	0	0	0	—		—		0	0	23	0
Sportivo Las Parejas	2019–20	Torneo Federal A	21	3	2	0	—		—		0	0	23	3
Villa Dálmine	2020–21	Primera B Nacional	0	0	0	0	—		—		0	0	0	0
Career total			70	3	2	0	—		—		0	0	72	3
