= Braian Rivero =

Argentine footballer

Personal information
- Full name: Braian Abel Rivero
- Date of birth: 22 February 1996 (age 30)
- Place of birth: Córdoba, Argentina
- Height: 1.78 m (5 ft 10 in)
- Position: Midfielder

Team information
- Current team: Atlanta

Youth career
- 2010–2015: Newell's Old Boys

Senior career*
Years	Team	Apps	(Gls)
2015–2021	Newell's Old Boys	60	(0)
2020–2021	→ Indep. del Valle (loan)	20	(0)
2021–2025	Defensa y Justicia	10	(0)
2022–2023	→ Arsenal Sarandí (loan)	49	(0)
2024	→ Platense (loan)	15	(0)
2025	→ Racing Córdoba (loan)	4	(0)
2025–2026	Los Chankas	10	(0)
2026–	Atlanta	2	(0)
- * Club domestic league appearances and goals as of 16:34, 24 April 2026 (UTC)

Braian Abel Rivero (born 22 February 1996) is an Argentine professional footballer who plays as a midfielder for Atlanta.

== Career ==
Rivero joined Newell's Old Boys' youth system in 2010. He got his senior career underway with Argentine Primera División side Newell's Old Boys in 2015, with his professional debut arriving on 28 September during an away win against Estudiantes. He didn't feature throughout the 2016 season, but did play five times during the following campaign of 2016–17. After sixty-seven appearances in all competitions for Newell's, Rivero departed on loan to Ecuadorian Serie A side Independiente del Valle in July 2020 until the end of 2021. The deal was made with a purchase option, with the Ecuadorian club paying a fee around US$180,000 for the loan deal. His first appearance came in a win away to El Nacional on 15 August. On 30 January 2021, the spell was cut short, after Arsenal decided to recall the player.

In June 2021, Rivero was sold to Defensa y Justicia, signing a deal until the end of 2025. Due to lack of playing time, Rivero was in February 2022 loaned out to fellow league club, Arsenal de Sarandí, until the end of June 2022 with a purchase option.

== Career statistics ==
As of 15 December 2020.

Club statistics
Club	Season	League			Cup		League Cup		Continental		Other		Total	
Club	Season	Division	Apps	Goals	Apps	Goals	Apps	Goals	Apps	Goals	Apps	Goals	Apps	Goals
Newell's Old Boys	2015	Primera División	1	0	0	0	—		—		0	0	1	0
Newell's Old Boys	2016	Primera División	0	0	0	0	—		—		0	0	0	0
Newell's Old Boys	2016–17	Primera División	4	0	1	0	—		—		0	0	5	0
Newell's Old Boys	2017–18	Primera División	24	0	1	0	—		2 (Note: Appearance(s) in the Copa Sudamericana)	0	0	0	27	0
Newell's Old Boys	2018–19	Primera División	18	0	3	0	2	0	—		0	0	23	0
Newell's Old Boys	2019–20	Primera División	10	0	0	0	1	0	—		0	0	11	0
Newell's Old Boys	2020–21	Primera División	0	0	0	0	0	0	—		0	0	0	0
Newell's Old Boys	Total		57	0	5	0	3	0	2	0	0	0	67	0
Independiente del Valle (loan)	2020	Serie A	20	0	0	0	—		3 (Note: Appearance(s) in the Copa Libertadores)	0	0	0	23	0
Career total			77	0	5	0	3	0	5	0	0	0	90	0
