= Alan Luque =

Argentine footballer

Personal information
- Full name: Alan Daniel Luque
- Date of birth: 20 February 1999 (age 27)
- Place of birth: Reconquista, Argentina
- Height: 1.79 m (5 ft 10 1/2 in)
- Position: Defender

Team information
- Current team: Chaco For Ever

Youth career
- Newell's Old Boys

Senior career*
Years	Team	Apps	(Gls)
2018–2021	Newell's Old Boys	0	(0)
2020–2021	→ CF Intercity (loan)	6	(0)
2021–2022	Huércal-Overa	32	(0)
2022	CA Carcarañá		
2023–2025	Sportivo Las Parejas	49	(1)
2025–	Chaco For Ever	37	(0)
- * Club domestic league appearances and goals as of 17:47, 24 April 2026 (UTC)

Alan Daniel Luque (born 20 February 1999) is an Argentine professional footballer who plays as a defender for Chaco For Ever.

== Career ==
=== Club ===
Luque started with Newell's Old Boys. He was selected on the substitutes bench for Argentine Primera División fixtures with Arsenal de Sarandí and Estudiantes during the 2017–18 campaign, though he didn't make it on to the field on both occasions. Luque's senior debut arrived in August 2018, with manager Omar De Felippe playing him for the full ninety minutes of a Copa Argentina tie with Defensores Unidos of Primera B Metropolitana.

=== International ===
Luque has trained with the Argentina U20s in the past, while he was also selected to train against the senior squad during the 2018 FIFA World Cup in Russia.

== Career statistics ==
As of 23 October 2018.

Club statistics
Club	Season	League			Cup (Note: Includes the Copa Argentina)		League Cup		Continental (Note: Includes the Copa Sudamericana)		Other		Total	
Club	Season	Division	Apps	Goals	Apps	Goals	Apps	Goals	Apps	Goals	Apps	Goals	Apps	Goals
Newell's Old Boys	2017–18	Primera División	0	0	0	0	—		0	0	0	0	0	0
Newell's Old Boys	2018–19	Primera División	0	0	1	0	—		0	0	0	0	1	0
Career total			0	0	1	0	—		0	0	0	0	1	0
