= Brian Sarmiento =

Argentine footballer (born 1990)

Personal information
- Full name: Brian Óscar Sarmiento
- Date of birth: 22 April 1990 (age 36)
- Place of birth: Rosario, Argentina
- Height: 1.66 m (5 ft 5 in)
- Position: Forward

Youth career
- Estudiantes

Senior career*
Years	Team	Apps	(Gls)
2006–2007	Estudiantes	0	(0)
2007–2011	Racing Santander	0	(0)
2008–2009	→ Xerez (loan)	26	(4)
2009–2010	→ Girona (loan)	11	(2)
2010–2011	→ Salamanca (loan)	40	(4)
2011–2012	Racing Club	4	(0)
2012–2013	Arsenal Sarandí	5	(0)
2013	→ All Boys (loan)	15	(1)
2013	Ponte Preta	3	(0)
2014	Quilmes	12	(3)
2015	Real Garcilaso	29	(7)
2016–2017	Banfield	37	(4)
2017–2019	Newell's Old Boys	18	(4)
2019	Volos	1	(0)
2020	All Boys	8	(1)
2021	Aurora	8	(0)
2022	San Miguel	18	(1)
Total		235	(31)

International career
2006	Argentina U17		
- Argentina U20
- * Club domestic league appearances and goals

Brian Óscar Sarmiento (born 22 April 1990) is an Argentine former professional footballer who played as a forward.

Other than in his country, he played in Spain, Brazil, Peru, Greece and Bolivia.

== Club career ==
Born in Rosario, Santa Fe Province to a Paraguayan mother, Sarmiento began his career in Argentina with Estudiantes de La Plata, signing for La Liga side Racing de Santander in July 2007. A complicated transfer situation between both clubs, which involved the Court of Arbitration for Sport's mediation, meant that the 17-year-old spent the entire 2007–08 season without making a single first-team appearance.

For the 2008–09 campaign, Sarmiento was loaned to Xerez CD of Segunda División, first appearing officially in a 1–1 home draw against Real Murcia CF on 3 September 2008 in the second round of the Copa del Rey. Although not an undisputed starter, he did feature significantly as the Andalusians achieved a first-ever top flight promotion, earning the nickname Currito de Jerez by their fans in the process.

On 31 August 2009, Sarmiento went on another season-long loan, yet in the second division, now with Girona FC. He made his first appearance on 3 October in a 2–2 draw with SD Huesca, scoring his team's second goal, but was released by the Catalans in late January 2010 for disciplinary issues, subsequently training with former club Santander to stay fit.

Sarmiento spent 2010–11 with UD Salamanca, again on loan and in the Spanish second tier. He netted for the first time in the league on 15 January 2011, but in 2–3 home loss to FC Barcelona B. On 1 March he scored the game's only goal at home against Villarreal CF B, helping the Castile and León side to their first win in three months.

Sarmiento then returned to the Argentine Primera División, where he represented in quick succession Racing Club de Avellaneda, Arsenal de Sarandí and All Boys. Following a very brief spell in Brazil with Associação Atlética Ponte Preta, he went back to his country with Quilmes Atlético Club.

On 21 January 2015, Sarmiento joined Peruvian Primera División's Real Garcilaso. During his one-year spell in Cusco, he played 39 matches in all competitions and scored eight times; additionally, he bought a bar in the city.

Back in Argentina, Sarmiento appeared for Club Atlético Banfield and Newell's Old Boys. During his stint at the latter, marred by injuries, he was often more talked about for his behaviour off the pitch.

In June 2019, Sarmiento signed for Greek club Volos FC. In September, after only eight minutes of action in the Super League, his contract was terminated by mutual consent, and he returned to All Boys shortly after on a one-and-a-half-year deal.

Sarmiento retired aged 32, his last two teams being Club Aurora (Bolivian Primera División) and Club Atlético San Miguel (Argentine Primera B Metropolitana).

== International career ==
Sarmiento was named Best Newcomer while playing for the Argentina under-17 team, in a friendly tournament in 2006. He also represented the nation at under-20 level.

== Honours ==
Xerez

- Segunda División: 2008–09
