= Treppo Carnico =

- Frazione
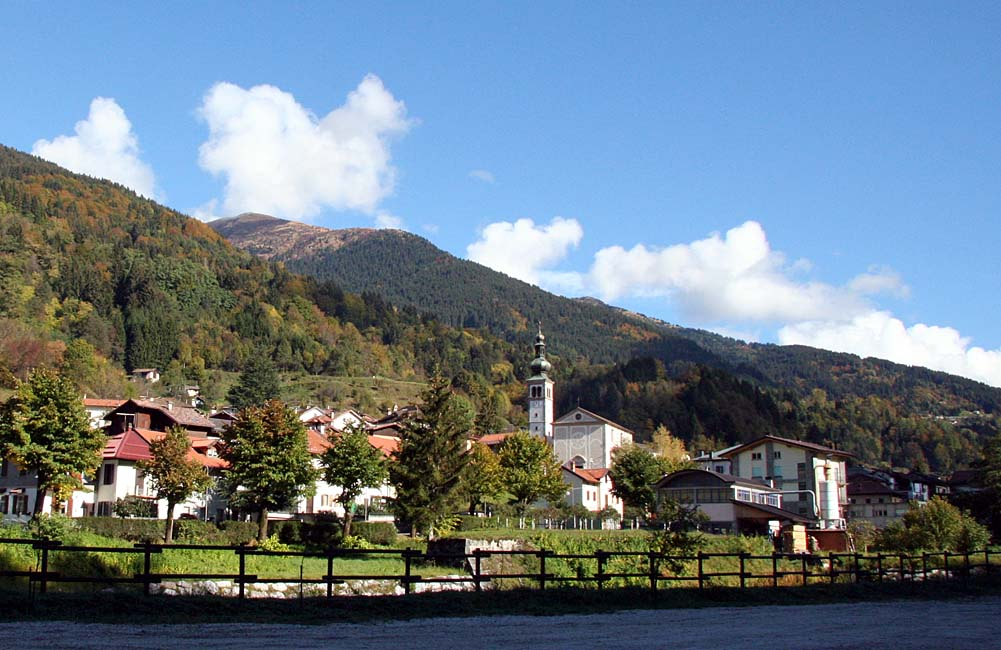

- Location of Treppo Carnico in Italy
- Coordinates: 46°32′N 13°3′E
- Country: Italy
- Region: Friuli-Venezia Giulia
- Province: Udine (UD)
- Comune: Treppo Ligosullo

Area
  - Total: 18.7 km^{2} (7.2 sq mi)
- Elevation: 671 m (2,201 ft)

Population (Dec. 2004)
  - Total: 652
  - Density: 34.9/km^{2} (90.3/sq mi)
- Time zone: UTC+1 (CET)
  - Summer (DST): UTC+2 (CEST)
- Postal code: 33020
- Dialing code: 0433

Treppo Carnico is a frazione of Treppo Ligosullo in the Province of Udine in the Italian region Friuli-Venezia Giulia, located about 120 kilometres (75 mi) northwest of Trieste and about 50 kilometres (31 mi) northwest of Udine. It was a separate comune until February 1 2018, when it was merged with Ligosullo, which created the Treppo Ligosullo comune.
