= 2017–18 Newell's Old Boys season =

Newell's Old Boys
2017–18 season
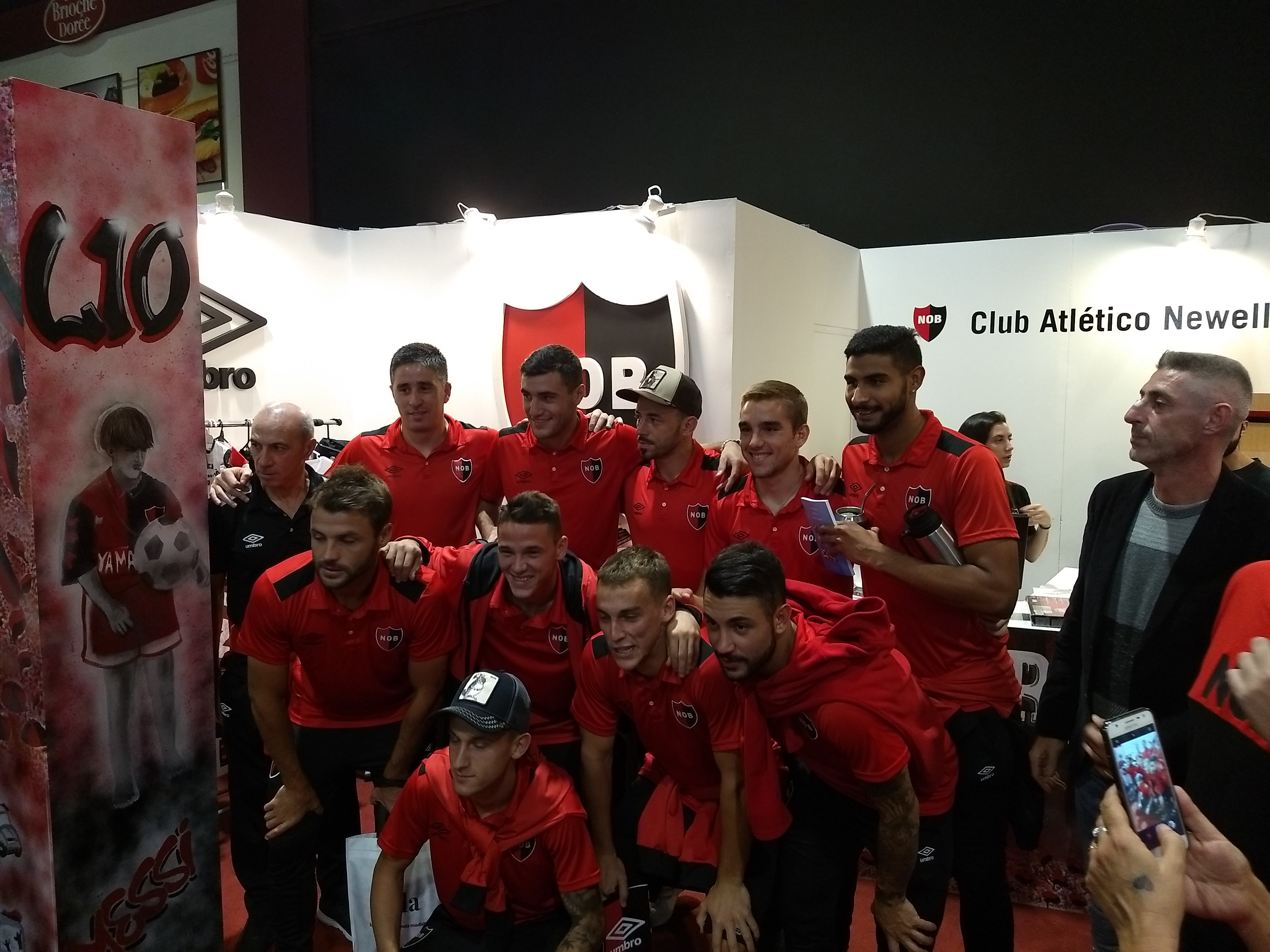
- Part of Newell's squad in May 2018
- Chairman: Eduardo Bermúdez
- Manager: Juan Manuel Llop; Omar De Felippe
- Stadium: Estadio Marcelo Bielsa
- Primera División: 24th
- 2016–17 Copa Argentina: Round of 32
- 2017–18 Copa Argentina: Round of 64
- Copa Sudamericana: First stage
- Top goalscorer: League: Two players (3); All: Two players (3)
Home colours	Away colours	Third colours

The 2017–18 season is Newell's Old Boys' 56th consecutive season in the top-flight of Argentine football. The season covers the period from 1 July 2017 to 30 June 2018.

== Current squad ==
As of 26 January 2018.

Note: Flags indicate national team as defined under FIFA eligibility rules; some limited exceptions apply. Players may hold more than one non-FIFA nationality.

No.	Pos.	Nation	Player
1	GK	ARG	Luciano Pocrnjic
4	DF	ARG	José San Román
6	DF	ARG	Sebastián Domínguez
16	FW	ARG	Víctor Figueroa
17	FW	ARG	Mauricio Tévez
18	MF	ARG	Joaquín Torres
20	MF	ARG	Joel Amoroso
21	DF	ARG	Juan Sills
22	MF	ARG	Alexis Rodríguez
23	GK	ARG	Sebastián D'Angelo
24	FW	ARG	Ignacio Huguenet
26	FW	ARG	Héctor Fértoli
30	DF	ARG	Nehuén Paz
34	FW	ARG	Carlos Rotondi

No.	Pos.	Nation	Player
36	DF	ARG	Franco Escobar
38	DF	ARG	Braian Rivero
39	MF	ARG	Jalil Elías
43	MF	ARG	Brian Bustos
—	FW	ARG	Brian Sarmiento (on loan from Banfield)
—	DF	ARG	Bruno Bianchi (on loan from Atlético Tucumán)
—	FW	ARG	Daniel Opazo
—	DF	PAR	Danilo Ortiz (on loan from Godoy Cruz)
—	FW	STP	Luís Leal (on loan from Chiapas)
—	FW	ARM	Mauro Guevgeozián (on loan from Temperley)
—	GK	ARG	Nelson Ibáñez (on loan from Tigre)
—	MF	ARG	Nery Leyes (on loan from Atlético Tucumán)
—	GK	ARG	Nicolás Temperini

=== Out on loan ===
Note: Flags indicate national team as defined under FIFA eligibility rules; some limited exceptions apply. Players may hold more than one non-FIFA nationality.

No.	Pos.	Nation	Player
14	DF	ARG	Lisandro Martínez (at Defensa y Justicia until 30 June 2018)
28	DF	ARG	Milton Valenzuela (at Columbus Crew SC until 8 December 2018)
33	FW	ARG	Matías Tissera (at Quilmes until 30 June 2018)

No.	Pos.	Nation	Player
—	FW	ARG	Francisco Fydriszewski (at Lugo until 30 June 2018)
—	DF	ARG	Gabriel Báez (at Venados until 30 June 2018)
—	MF	ARG	Iván Silva (at Guillermo Brown until 30 June 2018)

== Transfers ==
=== In ===
Date	Pos.	Name	From	Fee
16 July 2017	FW	(Argentina) Daniel Opazo	(Argentina) Cipolletti	Undisclosed

=== Out ===
Date	Pos.	Name	To	Fee
1 July 2017	FW	(Argentina) Ignacio Scocco	(Argentina) River Plate	Undisclosed
1 July 2017	DF	(Argentina) Maximiliano Pollacchi	(Argentina) Colegiales	Undisclosed
18 July 2017	MF	(Argentina) Eugenio Isnaldo	(Greece) Asteras Tripolis	Undisclosed
19 July 2017	MF	(Argentina) Jacobo Mansilla	(Argentina) Tigre	Undisclosed
26 July 2017	MF	(Argentina) Maxi Rodríguez	(Uruguay) Peñarol	Undisclosed
31 July 2017	MF	(Argentina) Federico Fattori	(Argentina) Nueva Chicago	Undisclosed
31 July 2017	FW	(Argentina) Franco Pérez	(Mexico) Morelia	Undisclosed
27 August 2017	MF	(Argentina) Emiliano Franco	(Argentina) Douglas Haig	Undisclosed

=== Loan in ===
Date from	Date to	Pos.	Name	From
6 July 2017	30 June 2018	FW	(Armenia) Mauro Guevgeozián	(Argentina) Temperley
14 July 2017	30 June 2018	DF	(Argentina) Bruno Bianchi	(Argentina) Atlético Tucumán
20 July 2017	30 June 2018	FW	(Argentina) Brian Sarmiento	(Argentina) Banfield
22 July 2017	30 June 2018	GK	(Argentina) Nelson Ibáñez	(Argentina) Tigre
27 July 2017	30 June 2018	MF	(Argentina) Nery Leyes	(Argentina) Atlético Tucumán
31 July 2017	30 June 2018	DF	(Paraguay) Danilo Ortiz	(Argentina) Godoy Cruz
6 August 2017	30 June 2018	FW	(São Tomé and Príncipe) Luís Leal	(Mexico) Chiapas

=== Loan out ===
Date from	Date to	Pos.	Name	To
1 July 2017	30 June 2018	DF	(Argentina) Gabriel Báez	(Mexico) Venados
10 August 2017	30 June 2018	DF	(Argentina) Lisandro Martínez	(Argentina) Defensa y Justicia
14 August 2017	30 June 2018	FW	(Argentina) Matías Tissera	(Argentina) Quilmes
15 August 2017	30 June 2018	MF	(Argentina) Iván Silva	(Argentina) Guillermo Brown
18 August 2017	30 June 2018	FW	(Argentina) Francisco Fydriszewski	(Spain) Lugo
19 August 2017	30 June 2018	MF	(Argentina) Marcos Pérez	(Argentina) Sportivo Belgrano
26 January 2018	8 December 2018	DF	(Argentina) Milton Valenzuela	(United States) Columbus Crew SC

== Friendlies ==
=== Pre-season ===
Win Draw Loss

29 July 2017 Friendly	Talleres (Argentina)	2–0	(Argentina) Newell's Old Boys	Córdoba, Argentina
10:00	A. Araujo; N. Giménez	Report		Stadium: Estadio La Boutique; Referee: Federico Cejas (Argentina)

29 July 2017 Friendly	Talleres (Argentina)	2–0	(Argentina) Newell's Old Boys	Córdoba, Argentina
11:15	J. Komar; J. Arias	Report		Stadium: Estadio La Boutique; Referee: Federico Cejas (Argentina)

5 August 2017 Friendly	Newell's Old Boys (Argentina)	3–1	(Argentina) Belgrano	Rosario, Argentina
	J. San Román 28'; V. Figueroa 59'; B. Rivero 70'	Report	T. Figueroa 58'	Stadium: Polideportivo de Bella Vista

12 August 2017 Friendly	Patronato (Argentina)	1–1	(Argentina) Newell's Old Boys	Rosario, Argentina
	A. Balboa	Report	J. Torres	Stadium: Polideportivo de Bella Vista

12 August 2017 Friendly	Patronato (Argentina)	0–2	(Argentina) Newell's Old Boys	Rosario, Argentina
		Report	M. Tévez; M. Tissera	Stadium: Polideportivo de Bella Vista

18 August 2017 Friendly	Newell's Old Boys (Argentina)	1–0	(Argentina) Talleres	Rosario, Argentina
	B. Bianchi	Report		Stadium: Estadio Marcelo Bielsa

18 August 2017 Friendly	Newell's Old Boys (Argentina)	1–0	(Argentina) Talleres	Rosario, Argentina
	J. San Román	Report		Stadium: Estadio Marcelo Bielsa

== Primera División ==
=== League table ===
Pos	Team	Pld	W	D	L	GF	GA	GD	Pts	Qualification
19	Patronato	27	8	9	10	26	32	−6	33	
20	Rosario Central	27	8	8	11	30	41	−11	32	Qualification for Copa Libertadores group stage (Note: Rosario Central qualified for the Copa Libertadores group stage by winning the 2017–18 Copa Argentina.)
21	Newell's Old Boys (Note: Newell's Old Boys were deducted one point for debts owed to former players. Originally AFA partially accepted the appeal by Newell's Old Boys reducing the penalty from three points to one point but a new appeal by Lanús overturned the decision. Finally, on 28 June 2019 CAS gave back two points to Newell´s Old Boys reducing the penalty to one point again.)	27	8	6	13	23	28	−5	29	
22	Lanús	27	6	11	10	20	37	−17	29	
23	Gimnasia y Esgrima (LP)	27	7	6	14	28	43	−15	27	

Source: AFA
Rules for classification: 1) points; 2) play-off (only if needed to decide championship); 3) goal difference; 4) goals scored; 5) head-to-head points; 6) head-to-head goal difference; 7) head-to-head goals scored.

=== Results by matchday ===
Matchday	1	2	3	4	5	6	7	8	9	10	11	12	13	14	15	16	17	18	19	20	21	22	23	24	25	26	27
Ground	H	A	H	A	H	A	H	A	H	A	H	A	H														
Result	D	L	W	L	D	L	W	D	L	W	D	L															
Position	13	22	14	16	18	20	19	19	22	18	22	24															

Updated to match(es) played on 12 December 2017. Source: Soccerway
A = Away; H = Home; W = Win; D = Draw; L = Loss

28 August 2017 1	Newell's Old Boys (Argentina)	1–1	(Argentina) Unión Santa Fe	Rosario, Argentina
19:05	M. Guevgeozián 74' (pen.)	Report	D. Zabala 52'	Stadium: Estadio Marcelo Bielsa; Referee: Fernando Espinoza (Argentina)

11 September 2017 2	Huracán (Argentina)	1–0	(Argentina) Newell's Old Boys	Buenos Aires, Argentina
21:05	I. Pussetto 45+2'	Report		Stadium: Estadio Tomás Adolfo Ducó; Referee: Mauro Vigliano (Argentina)

16 September 2017 3	Newell's Old Boys (Argentina)	2–0	(Argentina) Olimpo	Rosario, Argentina
16:15	L. Leal 69'; J. Torres 75'	Report		Stadium: Estadio Marcelo Bielsa; Referee: Pablo Echavarría (Argentina)

25 September 2017 4	Lanús (Argentina)	1–0	(Argentina) Newell's Old Boys	Rosario, Argentina
19:05	A. Silva 61'	Report		Stadium: Estadio Ciudad de Lanús – Néstor Díaz Pérez; Referee: Fernando Rapallini (Argentina)

2 October 2017 5	Newell's Old Boys (Argentina)	0–0	(Argentina) Godoy Cruz	Rosario, Argentina
21:05		Report		Stadium: Estadio Marcelo Bielsa; Referee: Andrés Merlos (Argentina)

14 October 2017 6	Vélez Sarsfield (Argentina)	1–0	(Argentina) Newell's Old Boys	Buenos Aires, Argentina
18:05	M. Vargas 33'	Report		Stadium: José Amalfitani Stadium; Referee: Darío Herrera (Argentina)

29 October 2017 7	Newell's Old Boys (Argentina)	2–1	(Argentina) Chacarita Juniors	Rosario, Argentina
11:05	B. Sarmiento 30'; B. Bianchi 40'	Report	J. Álvarez 83'	Stadium: Estadio Marcelo Bielsa; Referee: Diego Abal (Argentina)

6 November 2017 8	Patronato (Argentina)	0–0	(Argentina) Newell's Old Boys	Paraná, Argentina
19:05		Report		Stadium: Estadio Presbítero Bartolomé Grella; Referee: Nicolás Lamolina (Argentina)

17 November 2017 9	Newell's Old Boys (Argentina)	0–1	(Argentina) Belgrano	Rosario, Argentina
21:30		Report	J. Amoroso 89'	Stadium: Estadio Marcelo Bielsa; Referee: Pedro Argañaraz (Argentina)

26 November 2017 10	River Plate (Argentina)	1–3	(Argentina) Newell's Old Boys	Buenos Aires, Argentina
19:15	G. Martínez 67'	Report	L. Leal 73'; B. Sarmiento 80' (pen.); H. Fértoli 85'	Stadium: Estadio Monumental Antonio Vespucio Liberti; Referee: Facundo Tello (Argentina)

2 December 2017 11	Newell's Old Boys (Argentina)	2–2	(Argentina) Racing Club	Rosario, Argentina
21:30	L. Leal 12'; B. Sarmiento 33' (pen.)	Report	L. Martínez 21'; L. López 64'	Stadium: Estadio Marcelo Bielsa; Referee: Ariel Penel (Argentina)

10 December 2017 12	Rosario Central (Argentina)	1–0	(Argentina) Newell's Old Boys	Rosario, Argentina
17:00	G. Herrera 3'	Report		Stadium: Estadio Gigante de Arroyito; Referee: Néstor Pitana (Argentina)

January 2018 13	Newell's Old Boys (Argentina)	–	(Argentina) Arsenal de Sarandí	Rosario, Argentina
		Report		Stadium: Estadio Marcelo Bielsa

== Copa Argentina ==
Win Draw Loss

5 September 2017 R32	Newell's Old Boys (Argentina)	1–2	(Argentina) Godoy Cruz	Santa Fe, Argentina
21:10	L. Galeano 24' (o.g.)	Report	F. Rodríguez 30'; S. García 90+1'	Stadium: Estadio 15 de Abril; Referee: Luis Álvarez (Argentina)

== Copa Sudamericana ==
Win Draw Loss

–
