= 2026 AFA Liga Profesional de Fútbol =

Liga Profesional de Fútbol
- Season: 2026
- Dates: 22 January – 12 December 2026
- Champions: Apertura: Belgrano (1st title); Campeón de Liga: Boca Juniors (36th title)
- Relegated: Aldosivi; Estudiantes (RC)
- Copa Libertadores: Belgrano; Rosario Central; Argentinos Juniors; Independiente Rivadavia; Platense (via Copa Argentina); Boca Juniors (via Copa Sudamericana)
- Copa Sudamericana: Lanús
- Matches: 500
- Goals: 1,098 (2.2 per match)
- Top goalscorer: Apertura: Gabriel Ávalos (10 goals); Clausura: Ronaldo Martínez (11 goals)
- Biggest home win: Lanús 5–0 Newell's Old Boys (17 March 2026); Estudiantes (LP) 5–0 Central Córdoba (SdE) (23 March 2026); Rosario Central 5–0 Independiente Rivadavia (11 October 2026)
- Biggest away win: Central Córdoba (SdE) 0–5 Vélez Sarsfield (25 October 2026)
- Highest scoring: Independiente 4–4 Unión (10 March 2026)
- Longest winning run: Rosario Central (T. Clausura); 6 games
- Longest unbeaten run: Boca Juniors (T. Clausura); 15 games
- Longest winless run: Aldosivi (16 T. Apertura, 7 T. Clausura); 23 games
- Longest losing run: Defensa y Justicia (T. Apertura); River Plate (1 T. Apertura, 4 T. Clausura); Estudiantes (RC) (T. Clausura); Tigre (T. Clausura); 5 games
- All statistics correct as of 22 November 2026.

The 2026 Liga Profesional de Fútbol (officially the Torneo Mercado Libre 2026 for sponsorship reasons) is the 136th season of top-flight professional football in Argentina. The league season began on 22 January and will end on 12 December 2026.

Thirty teams compete in the league: 28 returning from the 2025 season as well as two promoted teams from the 2025 Primera Nacional (Gimnasia y Esgrima (M) and Estudiantes (RC), who were promoted after an absence of 41 and 40 years respectively). Estudiantes (LP) entered the season as the defending champions after winning the 2025 Torneo Clausura.

While the Torneo Apertura was taking place, the executive committee of the Liga Profesional de Fútbol unanimously decided on 23 February 2026 to postpone the ninth round of the tournament, which was scheduled to take place between 5 and 8 March 2026. This was in response to the legal investigation by ARCA (Agencia de Recaudación y Control Aduanero) against AFA regarding the nonpayment of social security contributions in 2024 and 2025. The round was rescheduled for between 2 and 4 May 2026.

Belgrano won their first national league championship on 24 May 2026, after defeating River Plate 3–2 in the Torneo Apertura Final. Boca Juniors earned the title of "Campeón de Liga" for having been the team with the most points in the aggregate table.

== Competition format ==
The competition format for this season consists of two tournaments: Torneo Apertura and Torneo Clausura, each with five stages. In the first stage, the 30 teams were divided into two groups of 15 teams each and play in a single round-robin format. Additionally, each team plays two inter-zone matches: against its rival from the other zone, and the second against a second team, determined by a draw. The top eight teams in each group advance to the round of 16. The final stages (round of 16, quarter-finals, semi-finals and final) are played on a single-leg basis.

The winners of the Torneo Apertura and Torneo Clausura will qualify for the 2027 Copa Libertadores as Argentina 1 and Argentina 2, respectively. Qualification for international tournaments will be determined by the overall standings of the 2026 Primera División.

A new league title, "Campeón de Liga", was created for the team with the most points in the aggregate table. Although the title was established at the end of 2025, it was awarded retroactively to Rosario Central that same year.

This season, two teams were relegated to the Primera Nacional. One team was relegated based on coefficients, and the team that finishes last in the 2026 aggregate table was also relegated.

== Club information ==
=== Stadia and locations ===
Locations of the 2026 Argentine Primera División teams outside Greater Buenos Aires.
Locations of the 2026 Argentine Primera División teams within Greater Buenos Aires.

Club	City	Stadium	Capacity
Aldosivi	Mar del Plata	José María Minella	35,180
Argentinos Juniors	Buenos Aires	Diego Armando Maradona	25,000
Atlético Tucumán	Tucumán	Monumental José Fierro	32,700
Banfield	Banfield	Florencio Sola	21,820
Barracas Central	Buenos Aires	Claudio "Chiqui" Tapia	4,400
Belgrano	Córdoba	Julio César Villagra	38,500
Boca Juniors	Buenos Aires	La Bombonera	54,000
Central Córdoba (SdE)	Santiago del Estero	Único Madre de Ciudades	34,000
Central Córdoba (SdE)	Santiago del Estero	Alfredo Terrera	16,000
Defensa y Justicia	Florencio Varela	Norberto "Tito" Tomaghello	12,000
Deportivo Riestra	Buenos Aires	Guillermo Laza	3,000
Estudiantes (LP)	La Plata	Jorge Luis Hirschi	30,000
Estudiantes (RC)	Río Cuarto	Ciudad de Río Cuarto Antonio Candini	12,000
Gimnasia y Esgrima (LP)	La Plata	Juan Carmelo Zerillo	26,544
Gimnasia y Esgrima (M)	Mendoza	Víctor Legrotaglie	11,000
Huracán	Buenos Aires	Tomás Adolfo Ducó	48,314
Independiente	Avellaneda	Libertadores de América - Ricardo Enrique Bochini	52,853
Independiente Rivadavia	Mendoza	Bautista Gargantini	24,000
Instituto	Córdoba	Juan Domingo Perón	26,535
Lanús	Lanús	Ciudad de Lanús - Néstor Díaz Pérez	47,090
Newell's Old Boys	Rosario	Marcelo Bielsa	38,095
Platense	Florida Este	Ciudad de Vicente López	22,530
Racing	Avellaneda	El Cilindro	55,880
River Plate	Buenos Aires	Monumental	83,196
Rosario Central	Rosario	Gigante de Arroyito	41,654
San Lorenzo	Buenos Aires	Pedro Bidegain	39,494
Sarmiento (J)	Junín	Eva Perón	19,000
Talleres (C)	Córdoba	Mario Alberto Kempes	57,000
Tigre	Victoria	José Dellagiovanna	26,282
Unión	Santa Fe	15 de Abril	22,852
Vélez Sarsfield	Buenos Aires	José Amalfitani	49,540

=== Personnel and sponsoring ===
Club	Manager	Kit manufacturer	Shirt sponsors (front)	Other sponsors
Aldosivi	(Argentina) Javier Sanguinetti	Kappa	Rapicuotas	List: Front: None; Back: Plusmar, Grupo Moscuzza; Sleeves: SPI Astilleros; Shorts: Uthgra Sasso Hotel; Socks: None; Number: None
Argentinos Juniors	(Argentina) Nicolás Diez	Umbro	Mr. Bet	List: Front: Emas S.A. Autoelevadores; Back: Angiocor, Vitta, Gelay Pastas; Sleeves: Gráfica Led, Nubax; Shorts: Angiocor, Pinturerías Megapint, Grupo a2; Socks: None; Number: None
Atlético Tucumán	(Argentina) Julio César Falcioni	Kappa	Caja Popular de Ahorros	List: Front: Rapicuotas, Sporting; Back: Red De Seguro Médico, Seguridad OMEGA; Sleeves: Casino Parque, Sheraton Tucumán Hotel; Shorts: Agua Palau, Boss Recovery, Supermercado El Marqués; Socks: None; Number: None
Banfield	(Argentina) Pedro Troglio	Macron	Rapicuotas	List: Front: None; Back: Flecha Carga, Multiled; Sleeves: Lomas de Zamora Partido, Radio Sapienza; Shorts: Radio Sapienza, UP Seguridad, Blokium 25; Socks: None; Number: None
Barracas Central	(Argentina) Damián Ayude	Retiel	None	List: Front: None; Back: Turbodisel; Sleeves: Gentech Suplementos Deportivos; Shorts: None; Socks: None; Number: None
Belgrano	(Argentina) Ricardo Zielinski	Umbro	Banco Macro	List: Front: Sanos Salud; Back: Sedilé; Sleeves: Nexo Turismo; Shorts: Cabify, Tadicor; Socks: None; Number: Rio Uruguay Seguros
Boca Juniors	(Argentina) Rodolfo Arruabarrena	Adidas	Betsson	List: Front: None; Back: DirecTV; Sleeves: Cetrogar; Shorts: PAX Assistance; Socks: None; Number: None
Central Córdoba (SdE)	(Argentina) Juan Carlos Roldán (caretaker)	Adhoc	Banco Santiago del Estero	List: Front: Santiago del Estero, Santiago del Estero Ciudad, Mc Center Deportes; Back: Tarjeta Sol, Qualitá Colchones; Sleeves: None; Shorts: None; Socks: None; Number: None
Defensa y Justicia	(Argentina) Julio Vaccari	KDY	Rapicuotas	List: Front: Tiper; Back: Volkswagen Autotag, Flecha Bus; Sleeves: Pago 24; Shorts: None; Socks: None; Number: Rio Uruguay Seguros
Deportivo Riestra	(Argentina) Gustavo Benítez	Adidas	Speed Unlimited	List: Front: None; Back: Speed Unlimited; Sleeves: None; Shorts: Speed Unlimited; Socks: None; Number: None
Estudiantes (LP)	(Uruguay) Alexander Medina	RUGE	Banco Supervielle	List: Front: None; Back: Mateu Sports, Mejor Crédito; Sleeves: Bricks M2V; Shorts: Placo Saint-Gobain; Socks: None; Number: None
Estudiantes (RC)	(Argentina) Gerardo Acuña (caretaker)	IFK Sports	Nobis Medical	List: Front: Vittal; Back: Deportes Río Cuarto, YPF Marijo; Sleeves: Gioda Automotores; Shorts: Municipalidad de Las Higueras, Tate Sport; Socks: None; Number: None
Gimnasia y Esgrima (LP)	(Argentina) Ariel Pereyra	Givova	Correo OCA	List: Front: None; Back: Flybondi, Plusmar; Sleeves: Prina Pantallas LED; Shorts: Boss Recovery, Aukot; Socks: None; Number: Rio Uruguay Seguros
Gimnasia y Esgrima (M)	(Argentina) Darío Franco	Mitre	Banco Macro	List: Front: CEOSA; Back: Nobis Medical, Mendoza; Sleeves: Montemar Compañía Financiera; Shorts: None; Socks: None; Number: None
Huracán	(Argentina) Diego Martínez	Kappa	Mr. Bet	List: Front: None; Back: Casablanca Pinturas; Sleeves: Flecha Bus; Shorts: Laboratorio IMAT, RoyalDoor; Socks: None; Number: Rio Uruguay Seguros
Independiente	(Brazil) Jadson Viera	Puma	Sports.bet.ar	List: Front: LealMedica; Back: Kanji, IOL Inversiones; Sleeves: Scienza Argentina; Shorts: None; Socks: None; Number: Multiled, Rio Uruguay Seguros
Independiente Rivadavia	(Argentina) Alfredo Berti	AIFIT	Sports.bet.ar	List: Front: None; Back: Zanella, Edelcos; Sleeves: Diario UNO Mendoza; Shorts: None; Socks: None; Number: None
Instituto	(Argentina) Diego Flores	Givova	Banco Macro	List: Front: Befol; Back: GS BIO, Nobis Medical; Sleeves: Nobis Medical; Shorts: SOS Red de Asistencia, GEA Cobertura de Salud, Ecoclean Córdoba; Socks: None; Number: None
Lanús	(Argentina) Mauricio Pellegrino	Umbro	Mapei	List: Front: None; Back: Ciudad Moto; Sleeves: None; Shorts: Nueva Chevallier, Pinturas Andina; Socks: None; Number: None
Newell's Old Boys	(Argentina) Frank Kudelka	AIFIT	City Center Online	List: Front: Nueva Cotar; Back: Hospital Italiano Rosario, Multiled; Sleeves: Celta Home; Shorts: Italmédica, DR Química; Socks: None; Number: Rio Uruguay Seguros
Platense	(Argentina) Martín Palermo	Puma	Planes ESCO	List: Front: PAX Assistance, Alprestamo; Back: Civile Propiedades, Multiled, Tienda Enova; Sleeves: Toshify; Shorts: Transfarmaco, Emergencias Salud, ¡appa!; Socks: None; Number: None
Racing	(Argentina) Sebastián Romero (caretaker)	Nike	Betsson	List: Front: None; Back: Cetrogar, American Vial; Sleeves: Rio Uruguay Seguros; Shorts: None; Socks: PAX Assistance; Number: None
River Plate	(Argentina) Leonardo Ponzio (caretaker)	Adidas	Betano	List: Front: None; Back: DirecTV; Sleeves: Assist Card; Shorts: None; Socks: None; Number: None
Rosario Central	(Argentina) Jorge Almirón	Le Coq Sportif	City Center Online	List: Front: Techaarg; Back: Kanji, Transelec; Sleeves: None; Shorts: PAX Assistance; Socks: None; Number: Rio Uruguay Seguros
San Lorenzo	(Argentina) Rubén Darío Insúa	Atomik	Casino Buenos Aires Online	List: Front: None; Back: Multitravel.com, Flecha Bus; Sleeves: Flecha Carga; Shorts: Perozzi e Hijo; Socks: None; Number: None
Sarmiento (J)	(Argentina) Facundo Sava	KION	Naldo Digital	List: Front: Clínica La Pequeña Familia, Nufarm; Back: Laboratorio Quimeco, Alra sur Volkswagen, Aceros Perkusic, Multiled; Sleeves: Sigma Agro; Shorts: Farmchem SA, Grupo Eduardo Beraza, LP Vidrios, FD Agro, Zayka Vecchio, NuproAgro, Sistemas Junín; Socks: MAN-TER Group; Number: None
Talleres (C)	(Argentina) Omar De Felippe	Le Coq Sportif	Holcim	List: Front: bplay; Back: IEB+; Sleeves: None; Shorts: MSC Cruceros, Nobis Medical; Socks: None; Number: None
Tigre	(Argentina) Juan Carlos Blengio (caretaker)	Kappa	Banco Macro	List: Front: None; Back: Banco Macro; Sleeves: None; Shorts: None; Socks: None; Number: None
Unión	(Argentina) Leonardo Madelón	Givova	OSPAT	List: Front: Vidalac, bplay, Red Mutual; Back: Flecha Bus, Gigared; Sleeves: Transporte Pedrito, Servicios Viales; Shorts: Flecha Bus, Sanatorio Santa Fe, bplay, Duracril, Vino Tinto Toro; Socks: Vidalac; Number: Sanatorio Santa Fe
Vélez Sarsfield	(Argentina) Guillermo Barros Schelotto	Macron	Saphirus	List: Front: Bajaj Auto; Back: Dioxaflex, Banco Supervielle; Sleeves: None; Shorts: Turbodisel, GO! Assistance; Socks: None; Number: Rio Uruguay Seguros

=== Managerial changes ===
Team	Outgoing manager	Manner of departure	Date of vacancy	Position in table	Replaced by	Date of appointment
Newell's Old Boys	(Argentina) Lucas Bernardi	End of caretaker spell	16 November 2025	Pre-season	(Argentina) Favio Orsi and (Argentina) Sergio Gómez	19 December 2025
Platense	(Argentina) Hernán Lamberti and (Argentina) Guillermo Báez	End of caretaker spell	17 November 2025	Pre-season	(Argentina) Walter Zunino	24 November 2025
Huracán	(Argentina) Frank Kudelka	End of contract	18 November 2025	Pre-season	(Argentina) Diego Martínez	3 December 2025
Central Córdoba (SdE)	(Argentina) Omar De Felippe	End of contract	1 December 2025	Pre-season	(Argentina) Lucas Pusineri	5 December 2025
Rosario Central	(Argentina) Ariel Holan	End of contract	11 December 2025	Pre-season	(Argentina) Jorge Almirón	15 December 2025
Torneo Apertura changes
Instituto	(Argentina) Daniel Oldrá	Mutual agreement	26 January 2026	15th Zone A	(Argentina) Diego Flores ^{1}	12 February 2026
Estudiantes (LP)	(Argentina) Eduardo Domínguez	Signed by Atlético Mineiro	20 February 2026	1st Zone A	(Uruguay) Alexander Medina	23 February 2026
Newell's Old Boys	(Argentina) Favio Orsi and (Argentina) Sergio Gómez	Sacked	21 February 2026	15th Zone A	(Argentina) Frank Kudelka ^{2}	26 February 2026
Atlético Tucumán	(Argentina) Hugo Colace	Sacked	25 February 2026	12th Zone B	(Argentina) Julio César Falcioni ^{3}	4 March 2026
River Plate	(Argentina) Marcelo Gallardo	Resigned	26 February 2026	5th Zone B	(Argentina) Eduardo Coudet ^{4}	4 March 2026
Estudiantes (RC)	(Argentina) Iván Delfino	Sacked	13 March 2026	15th Zone B	(Argentina) Gerardo Acuña ^{5}	14 March 2026
San Lorenzo	(Argentina) Damián Ayude	Sacked	17 March 2026	9th Zone A	(Argentina) Gustavo Álvarez ^{6}	22 March 2026
Aldosivi	(Argentina) Guillermo Farré	Sacked	17 March 2026	14th Zone B	(Argentina) Israel Damonte ^{7}	26 March 2026
Gimnasia y Esgrima (M)	(Argentina) Ariel Broggi	Mutual agreement	23 March 2026	13th Zone A	(Argentina) Darío Franco	28 March 2026
Deportivo Riestra	(Argentina) Gustavo Benítez	Mutual agreement	4 April 2026	14th Zone A	(Argentina) Guillermo Duró	5 April 2026
Gimnasia y Esgrima (LP)	(Argentina) Fernando Zaniratto	Sacked	6 April 2026	11th Zone B	(Argentina) Ariel Pereyra ^{8}	7 April 2026
Inter-tournament changes
Estudiantes (RC)	(Argentina) Gerardo Acuña	End of caretaker spell	6 May 2026	N/A	(Argentina) Rubén Forestello	22 May 2026
Defensa y Justicia	(Argentina) Mariano Soso	Resigned	11 May 2026	N/A	(Argentina) Julio Vaccari	24 May 2026
Talleres (C)	(Argentina) Carlos Tevez	End of contract	13 May 2026	N/A	(Argentina) Jorge Sampaoli ^{9}	10 June 2026
Racing	(Argentina) Gustavo Costas	Sacked	23 May 2026	N/A	(Argentina) Juan Pablo Vojvoda ^{10}	22 June 2026
Boca Juniors	(Argentina) Claudio Úbeda	End of contract	28 May 2026	N/A	(Argentina) Rodolfo Arruabarrena	18 June 2026
Barracas Central	(Argentina) Rubén Darío Insúa	Mutual agreement	13 June 2026	N/A	(Argentina) Damián Ayude	20 June 2026
San Lorenzo	(Argentina) Gustavo Álvarez	Resigned	22 June 2026	N/A	(Argentina) Néstor Gorosito	3 July 2026
Central Córdoba (SdE)	(Argentina) Lucas Pusineri	Resigned	16 July 2026	N/A	(Argentina) Sebastián Domínguez ^{11}	26 July 2026
Torneo Clausura changes
Platense	(Argentina) Walter Zunino	Mutual agreement	4 August 2026	15th Zone A	(Argentina) Martín Palermo	5 August 2026
Independiente	(Bolivia) Gustavo Quinteros	Sacked	13 August 2026	7th Zone A	(Brazil) Jadson Viera ^{12}	15 August 2026
River Plate	(Argentina) Eduardo Coudet	Resigned	27 August 2026	14th Zone B	(Argentina) Leonardo Ponzio ^{13}	27 August 2026
Aldosivi	(Argentina) Israel Damonte	Resigned	27 August 2026	15th Zone B	(Argentina) Javier Sanguinetti ^{14}	3 September 2026
Talleres (C)	(Argentina) Jorge Sampaoli	Resigned	30 August 2026	15th Zone A	(Argentina) Omar De Felippe	1 September 2026
San Lorenzo	(Argentina) Néstor Gorosito	Mutual agreement	1 September 2026	14th Zone A	(Argentina) Rubén Darío Insúa ^{15}	7 September 2026
Racing	(Argentina) Juan Pablo Vojvoda	Mutual agreement	28 September 2026	14th Zone B	(Argentina) Sebastián Romero ^{13}	29 September 2026
Tigre	(Argentina) Diego Dabove	Resigned	23 October 2026	11th Zone B	(Argentina) Juan Carlos Blengio ^{13}	25 October 2026
Deportivo Riestra	(Argentina) Guillermo Duró	Resigned	27 October 2026	13th Zone A	(Argentina) Gustavo Benítez	28 October 2026
Estudiantes (RC)	(Argentina) Rubén Forestello	Mutual agreement	4 November 2026	15th Zone B	(Argentina) Gerardo Acuña ^{13}	5 November 2026
Central Córdoba (SdE)	(Argentina) Sebastián Domínguez	Mutual agreement	5 November 2026	15th Zone A	(Argentina) Juan Carlos Roldán ^{13}	6 November 2026

Interim managers

1. (Argentina) Daniel Jiménez and (Argentina) Bruno Martelotto were interim managers in the Torneo Apertura 3rd–4th rounds.
2. (Argentina) Lucas Bernardi was interim manager in the Torneo Apertura 7th round.
3. (Argentina) Ramiro González was interim manager in the Torneo Apertura 8th round.
4. (Argentina) Marcelo Escudero was interim manager in the Torneo Apertura 8th round.
5. Interim manager until the end of the Torneo Apertura.
6. Alan Capobianco was interim manager in the 2026 Copa Argentina round of 64.
7. (Argentina) Facundo Oreja was interim manager in the Torneo Apertura 12th round.
8. Interim manager, but later promoted to manager.
9. Ezequiel Carboni was interim manager in the 2026 Copa Argentina round of 32.
10. (Argentina) Sebastián Romero was interim manager in the 2026 Copa Sudamericana Group E 6th round.
11. (Argentina) Matías Villavicencio was interim manager in the Torneo Clausura 1st round.
12. (Argentina) Carlos Matheu was interim manager in the Torneo Clausura 5th round.
13. Interim manager until the end of the Torneo Clausura.
14. (Argentina) Mariano Felices was interim manager in the Torneo Clausura 7th round.
15. (Argentina) Walter Perazzo was interim manager in the Torneo Clausura 8th round.

=== Foreign players ===
- Players marked in **bold** joined the club during the inter-tournament period and only played with the respective team in the Torneo Clausura.
- Players who participated in the Torneo Apertura but left the team during the inter-tournament period are listed in the last column.

Club	Player 1	Player 2	Player 3	Player 4	Player 5	Player 6	Torneo Apertura
Aldosivi	(Uruguay) Federico Gino						List: (Uruguay) Junior Arias; (Uruguay) Mauro Da Luz; (Paraguay) Fernando Román; (Colombia) Alejandro Villarreal
Argentinos Juniors	(Chile) Brayan Cortés	(Japan) Ryōga Kida	(Paraguay) **Alan Núñez**				List: (Uruguay) Joaquín Ardaiz; (Uruguay) Leandro Lozano; (Chile) Iván Morales
Atlético Tucumán	(Paraguay) Clever Ferreira	(Uruguay) Franco Nicola	(Uruguay) Maximiliano Villa				List: (Paraguay) Javier Domínguez; (Italy) Lucas Román (dn)
Banfield	(Colombia) **Manuel Arteaga**	(Uruguay) **Adrián Balboa**	(Uruguay) **Alexander Machado**	(Colombia) Neyder Moreno			List: (Colombia) Danilo Arboleda; (Uruguay) Mauro Méndez
Barracas Central	(Paraguay) Rodrigo Bogarín	(Uruguay) Jhonatan Candia	(Paraguay) Juan Espínola	(Colombia) Yeison Gordillo	(Uruguay) Yonatthan Rak	(Puerto Rico) Wilfredo Rivera	
Belgrano	(Paraguay) Alcides Benítez	(Uruguay) Thiago Cardozo	(Uruguay) Federico Ricca				
Boca Juniors	(Uruguay) **Leandro Lozano**	(Colombia) **Álvaro Montero**	(Chile) Carlos Palacios	(Paraguay) Ángel Romero	(Ecuador) **Enner Valencia**	(Colombia) **Sebastián Villa**	List: (Uruguay) Edinson Cavani; (Spain) Ander Herrera
Central Córdoba (SdE)	(Colombia) **Felipe Aguilar**	(Paraguay) **Darío Cáceres**	(Uruguay) Michael Santos				
Defensa y Justicia	(Uruguay) **Ezequiel Burdín**	(Uruguay) Juan Manuel Gutiérrez	(Chile) César Pérez	(Paraguay) **Fernando Román**			List: (Syria) Emiliano Amor (dn); (Paraguay) Darío Cáceres; (Paraguay) David Fernández; (Uruguay) Cristopher Fiermarin; (Uruguay) Luciano González
Deportivo Riestra	(Paraguay) **Marino Arzamendia**	(Colombia) Yeison Murillo					List: (Nigeria) Johnson Nsumoh
Estudiantes (LP)	(Colombia) Edwuin Cetré	(Colombia) **Miguel Monsalve**	(Uruguay) Gabriel Neves				
Estudiantes (RC)	(Colombia) **Juan Chalá**	(Colombia) **Yeison Moreno**					List: (Uruguay) Renzo Bacchia
Gimnasia y Esgrima (LP)	(Colombia) **Harlen Castillo**	(Uruguay) Enzo Martínez	(Colombia) Juan José Pérez				
Gimnasia y Esgrima (M)	(Paraguay) Blas Armoa	(Paraguay) Juan José Franco					List: (Syria) Tobías Cervera (dn)
Huracán	(Ecuador) Jordy Caicedo	(Colombia) Óscar Cortés	(Uruguay) **Rodrigo Fernández**	(Paraguay) Óscar Romero	(Uruguay) Facundo Waller		
Independiente	(Uruguay) Matías Abaldo	(Colombia) Santiago Arias	(Uruguay) **Santiago Mele**	(Chile) **Iván Morales**			List: (Paraguay) Gabriel Ávalos; (Uruguay) Rodrigo Fernández; (Chile) Maximiliano Gutiérrez
Independiente Rivadavia	(Paraguay) Álex Arce	(Uruguay) Leonard Costa	(Colombia) **Luis Díaz**	(Paraguay) José Florentín	(Paraguay) Iván Villalba		List: (Colombia) Sebastián Villa
Instituto	(Colombia) Jhon Córdoba	(Uruguay) Matias Fonseca	(Chile) Nicolás Guerra	(Paraguay) Manuel Romero	(Uruguay) **Lucas Sanseviero**	(Paraguay) **Wilder Viera**	
Lanús	(Paraguay) José Canale	(Paraguay) Ronaldo Dejesús	(Colombia) Raúl Loaiza	(Chile) Matías Sepúlveda	(Colombia) Yoshan Valois	(Paraguay) **Allan Wlk**	
Newell's Old Boys	(Uruguay) Matías Cóccaro	(Uruguay) Ignacio Ramírez	(Paraguay) Saúl Salcedo				List: (Mexico) Thiago Gigena (dn); (Uruguay) Armando Méndez (dn)
Platense	(Uruguay) Martín Barrios	(Paraguay) Héctor Bobadilla	(Uruguay) **Nicolás López**				List: (Uruguay) Agustín Ocampo
Racing	(Ecuador) Alberto Campo	(Uruguay) **Alfonso Espino**	(Colombia) Duván Vergara				List: (Uruguay) Gastón Martirena; (Chile) Damián Pizarro
River Plate	(Uruguay) **Mauro Arambarri**	(Colombia) **Rafael Santos Borré**	(Uruguay) **Giovanni González**				List: (Colombia) Kevin Castaño; (Chile) Paulo Díaz (dn); (Ecuador) Kendry Páez; (Colombia) Juan Fernando Quintero; (Uruguay) Matías Viña
Rosario Central	(Colombia) Jaminton Campaz	(Uruguay) Facundo Mallo	(Chile) Vicente Pizarro	(Uruguay) **Alan Rodríguez**	(Paraguay) **Sebastián Zaracho**		List: (Paraguay) Enzo Giménez
San Lorenzo	(Colombia) **Danilo Arboleda**	(Uruguay) Guzmán Corujo	(Uruguay) Mathías De Ritis	(Colombia) Diego Herazo			List: (Paraguay) Orlando Gill; (Colombia) Jhohan Romaña
Sarmiento (J)	(Colombia) **Iván Arboleda**	(Paraguay) Osmar Giménez	(Paraguay) Junior Marabel	(Uruguay) **Agustín Nadruz**	(Uruguay) Renzo Orihuela	(Colombia) Jhon Rentería	List: (Ecuador) Javier Burrai (dn); (Paraguay) Ulises Delgado
Talleres (C)	(Uruguay) **Agustín Álvarez**	(Paraguay) Alexandro Maidana	(Brazil) Rick	(Colombia) Diego Valoyes			List: (Chile) Bruno Barticciotto (dn); (Paraguay) Ronaldo Martínez; (Chile) Ulises Ortegoza (dn); (Brazil) Rodrigo Guth
Tigre	(Uruguay) Ramón Arias	(Uruguay) **Mauro Méndez**	(Paraguay) Alfio Oviedo	(Chile) Guillermo Soto			List: (Syria) Jalil Elías (dn)
Unión	(Uruguay) **Juan Pintado**	(Uruguay) **Matías Rocha**					List: (Uruguay) Emiliano Álvarez; (Uruguay) Maizon Rodríguez
Vélez Sarsfield	(Chile) Claudio Baeza	(Paraguay) **Ronaldo Martínez**	(Chile) Diego Valdés				List: (Malaysia) Imanol Machuca ^{a} (dn); (Colombia) Álvaro Montero; (Uruguay) Rodrigo Piñeiro

==== Players holding Argentinian dual nationality ====
They do not take up a foreign slot.

- (Slovenia) **Andrés Vombergar** (Aldosivi)
- (Syria) Ezequiel Ham (Atlético Tucumán)
- (Syria) Ignacio Abraham (Banfield)
- (Armenia) Tomás Adoryán (Banfield)
- (Chile) Thomas Rodríguez (Banfield)
- (Armenia) Norberto Briasco (Barracas Central)
- (Armenia) Lucas Zelarayán (Belgrano)
- (Chile) Williams Alarcón (Boca Juniors)
- (Paraguay) Adam Bareiro (Boca Juniors) ^{b}
- (Uruguay) Miguel Merentiel (Boca Juniors)
- (Paraguay) Juan José Cardozo (Central Córdoba (SdE))
- (Paraguay) Emiliano Cantero (Defensa y Justicia)
- (Paraguay) David Martínez (Defensa y Justicia)
- (Uruguay) Antony Alonso (Deportivo Riestra)
- (Paraguay) Santiago Arzamendia (Estudiantes (LP))
- (Syria) **Jalil Elías** (Estudiantes (LP))
- (Uruguay) Fernando Muslera (Estudiantes (LP))
- (Uruguay) Tiago Palacios (Estudiantes (LP))
- (Brazil) Benjamín Sagüés Barreiro (Estudiantes (LP))
- (Paraguay) Javier Ferreira (Estudiantes (RC))
- (Syria) **Ibrahim Hesar** (Estudiantes (RC))
- (Paraguay) Pablo Aguiar (Gimnasia y Esgrima (LP))
- (Italy) Agustín Módica (Gimnasia y Esgrima (M))
- (Chile) **Bruno Barticciotto** (Huracán)
- (Switzerland) Lucas Blondel (Huracán)
- (Ecuador) Hernán Galíndez (Huracán)
- (Chile) Leonardo Gil (Huracán)
- (Chile) Luciano Cabral (Independiente)
- (Malaysia) **Imanol Machuca** (Independiente) ^{a}
- (Chile) Lautaro Millán (Independiente)
- (Uruguay) Gonzalo Pérez (Lanús) ^{b}
- (Chile) Gabriel Arias (Newell's Old Boys)
- (United States) **Alan Soñora** (Newell's Old Boys)
- (United States) Matko Miljevic (Racing)
- (Chile) **Ulises Ortegoza** (Racing)
- (Paraguay) Alexis Yegros (Racing)
- (Paraguay) Agustín Sández (Rosario Central)
- (Paraguay) Leonardo Sosa (Rosario Central)
- (Syria) **Emiliano Amor** (San Lorenzo)
- (Chile) Matías Catalán (Talleres (C))
- (Peru) Marco Rivas (Tigre)
- (Paraguay) Leo Cristaldo (Vélez Sarsfield)

Source: AFA

a. Following an investigation by FIFA into document falsification by the Football Association of Malaysia, Machuca was suspended from professional football for one year on 26 September 2025. However, on 26 January 2026, the Court of Arbitration for Sport (CAS) provisionally lifted the ban, enabling Machuca to play for Vélez Sarsfield until 5 March 2026, when the CAS confirmed the one-year suspension. He remained a Vélez Sarsfield player until the club decided to end his loan from Fortaleza prematurely in June 2026. In July 2026, Independiente signed Machuca from Fortaleza, even though his suspension was set to end on 1 November 2026. He finally made his debut with Independiente on the penultimate round of the group stage of the Torneo Clausura on 2 November 2026.

b. During the Torneo Apertura, Bareiro and Pérez were listed as foreign players. They obtained Argentine citizenship between the Torneo Apertura and Torneo Clausura.

== Draw ==
The draw for the group stages was held on 10 December 2025, 12:00, at the AFA Futsal Stadium in Ezeiza. The 30 teams were divided into two groups of fifteen, with one team from each of the interzonal matches.

Interzonal matches
Team 1	Team 2
Newell's Old Boys; Huracán; Aldosivi; Independiente; Belgrano; Argentinos Juniors; Sarmiento (J); Barracas Central; Banfield; Boca Juniors; Estudiantes (RC); Tigre; Estudiantes (LP); Atlético Tucumán; Gimnasia y Esgrima (M)	Rosario Central; San Lorenzo; Defensa y Justicia; Racing; Talleres (C); Platense; Unión; Deportivo Riestra; Lanús; River Plate; Instituto; Vélez Sarsfield; Gimnasia y Esgrima (LP); Central Córdoba (SdE); Independiente Rivadavia

== Torneo Apertura ==
The 2026 Torneo Apertura (officially the Torneo Apertura Mercado Libre 2026 for sponsorship reasons) was the first tournament of the 2026 season. It began on 22 January and ended on 24 May 2026.

=== Group stage ===
In the group stage, each group was played on a single round-robin basis. In addition, each team played two inter-zone matches: the first against its rival from the other zone, and the second, in the sixth round, against a second team determined by a draw. Teams were ranked according to the following criteria: 1. Points (3 points for a win, 1 point for a draw, and 0 points for a loss); 2. Goal difference; 3. Goals scored; 4. Head-to-head results; 5. Fair play ranking; 6. Draw.

The top eight teams of each group advanced to the round of 16.

==== Standings ====
===== Zone A =====
Pos	Team	Pld	W	D	L	GF	GA	GD	Pts	Qualification
1	Estudiantes (LP)	16	9	4	3	19	7	+12	31	Advance to round of 16
2	Boca Juniors	16	8	6	2	22	9	+13	30	Advance to round of 16
3	Vélez Sarsfield	16	7	7	2	18	12	+6	28	Advance to round of 16
4	Talleres (C)	16	7	5	4	17	13	+4	26	Advance to round of 16
5	Independiente	16	6	6	4	24	20	+4	24	Advance to round of 16
6	Lanús	16	6	6	4	18	15	+3	24	Advance to round of 16
7	San Lorenzo	16	5	7	4	14	14	0	22	Advance to round of 16
8	Unión	16	5	6	5	24	20	+4	21	Advance to round of 16
9	Instituto	16	6	3	7	17	17	0	21	
10	Defensa y Justicia	16	4	7	5	18	21	−3	19	
11	Gimnasia y Esgrima (M)	16	5	4	7	14	22	−8	19	
12	Platense	16	3	7	6	10	15	−5	16	
13	Central Córdoba (SdE)	16	4	4	8	11	21	−10	16	
14	Newell's Old Boys	16	3	6	7	15	27	−12	15	
15	Deportivo Riestra	16	1	8	7	5	12	−7	11	

Source: AFA Soccerway

===== Zone B =====
Pos	Team	Pld	W	D	L	GF	GA	GD	Pts	Qualification
1	Independiente Rivadavia	16	10	4	2	29	15	+14	34	Advance to round of 16
2	River Plate	16	9	2	5	22	12	+10	29	Advance to round of 16
3	Argentinos Juniors	16	8	5	3	17	13	+4	29	Advance to round of 16
4	Rosario Central	16	8	4	4	20	16	+4	28	Advance to round of 16
5	Belgrano	16	7	5	4	17	13	+4	26	Advance to round of 16
6	Gimnasia y Esgrima (LP)	16	8	2	6	19	19	0	26	Advance to round of 16
7	Huracán	16	5	7	4	17	13	+4	22	Advance to round of 16
8	Racing	16	5	6	5	17	15	+2	21	Advance to round of 16
9	Barracas Central	16	5	6	5	15	15	0	21	
10	Tigre	16	4	8	4	18	15	+3	20	
11	Sarmiento (J)	16	6	1	9	13	20	−7	19	
12	Banfield	16	5	3	8	17	19	−2	18	
13	Atlético Tucumán	16	3	5	8	15	20	−5	14	
14	Aldosivi	16	0	8	8	6	19	−13	8	
15	Estudiantes (RC)	16	1	2	13	5	24	−19	5	

Source: AFA Soccerway

==== Results ====
In the group stage, teams played every other team in their group once (either home or away), plus two interzonal games, for a total of 16 rounds.

===== Zone A =====
Home \ Away	BOC	CCO	DYJ	DRI	EST	GME	IND	INS	LAN	NOB	PLA	SLO	TAL	UNI	VEL
Boca Juniors				1–0		1–1	1–1	2–0		2–0	0–0	1–1			
Central Córdoba (SdE)	1–2			1–0		0–1				1–3	4–3		2–0	1–0	
Defensa y Justicia	0–4	1–1			0–0				1–1				1–2	2–0	1–1
Deportivo Riestra			0–1			0–0	2–0	0–1		1–1	0–0	1–1			
Estudiantes (LP)	2–1	5–0		1–0					0–1				0–0	2–1	0–1
Gimnasia y Esgrima (M)			2–1		1–2		1–1	1–0	1–0			0–1			3–2
Independiente		2–0	3–1		1–1				2–0				1–2	4–4	1–1
Instituto		2–0	2–0		0–1		2–1		2–2					1–2	0–1
Lanús	0–3	0–0		0–0						5–0	0–0		1–1	2–1	
Newell's Old Boys			2–3		0–2	1–0	1–1	1–1			1–1	0–0			
Platense			0–0		0–2	1–1	0–1	2–1				0–1			0–2
San Lorenzo		1–0	2–5		1–0		1–2	1–1	2–3						0–0
Talleres (C)	0–1			2–0		2–1		2–0		2–1	1–2	0–0			
Unión	1–1			2–0		4–0				2–3	0–0	0–0	1–1		
Vélez Sarsfield	2–1	1–0		0–0					0–1	1–1			2–1	2–2	

Source: AFA
Legend: Blue = home team win; Yellow = draw; Red = away team win.

===== Zone B =====
Home \ Away	ALD	ARG	ATU	BAN	BAR	BEL	ERC	GLP	HUR	IRI	RAC	RIV	ROS	SAR	TIG
Aldosivi		0–2			0–0		0–0		0–0	1–1	1–1		1–1		
Argentinos Juniors			1–0	3–2	1–1	0–0						1–0	0–0	1–0	
Atlético Tucumán	1–1			1–1			4–0	1–0	1–1		0–3				0–0
Banfield	2–0						2–1	1–2	1–1	0–0	0–2				1–0
Barracas Central			2–1	1–2		0–0		2–0				0–1		1–2	2–1
Belgrano	1–0		3–1	1–0				0–1			1–2			4–0	1–1
Estudiantes (RC)		0–0			1–2	0–1			2–0	0–1		0–2	1–2		
Gimnasia y Esgrima (LP)	3–1	2–0					1–0		0–3	2–3	2–1		1–2		
Huracán		1–2			0–0	3–1				1–2		1–2	3–1	1–0	
Independiente Rivadavia		3–1	2–1		1–2	0–1						1–1	2–0	2–1	
Racing		2–1			1–1		2–0		0–0	1–1		0–2	1–2		
River Plate	3–1		0–1	3–1		3–0		2–0						2–0	1–4
Rosario Central			2–1	2–1	2–0	1–2						0–0		2–1	1–1
Sarmiento (J)	2–0		2–1	1–0			1–0	1–2			0–0				1–0
Tigre	1–0	1–1					2–0	2–2	1–1	0–2	3–1				

Source: AFA
Legend: Blue = home team win; Yellow = draw; Red = away team win.

===== Interzonal matches =====
Home	Score	Away
Aldosivi	0–0	Defensa y Justicia
Atlético Tucumán	0–0	Central Córdoba (SdE)
Barracas Central	1–1	Deportivo Riestra
Huracán	1–0	San Lorenzo
Gimnasia y Esgrima (LP)	0–0	Estudiantes (LP)
Sarmiento (J)	1–3	Unión
Newell's Old Boys	0–2	Rosario Central
Tigre	1–1	Vélez Sarsfield
Belgrano	0–0	Talleres (C)
Argentinos Juniors	1–0	Platense
Independiente	1–0	Racing
Lanús	1–0	Banfield
River Plate	0–1	Boca Juniors
Independiente Rivadavia	5–1	Gimnasia y Esgrima (M)
Estudiantes (RC)	0–2	Instituto

Home	Score	Away
Defensa y Justicia	1–1	Belgrano
Estudiantes (LP)	1–0	Sarmiento (J)
Boca Juniors	0–0	Racing
Instituto	2–1	Atlético Tucumán
Gimnasia y Esgrima (M)	0–1	Gimnasia y Esgrima (LP)
Rosario Central	0–1	Talleres (C)
Independiente Rivadavia	3–2	Independiente
Platense	1–0	Barracas Central
Banfield	3–0	Newell's Old Boys
Deportivo Riestra	0–0	Huracán
Central Córdoba (SdE)	0–0	Tigre
San Lorenzo	2–0	Estudiantes (RC)
Vélez Sarsfield	1–0	River Plate
Unión	1–0	Aldosivi
Argentinos Juniors	2–1	Lanús

Source: AFA
Legend: Blue = home team win; Yellow = draw; Red = away team win.

=== Final stages ===
Starting from the round of 16, the teams played a single-elimination tournament on a single-leg basis with the following rules:

- In the round of 16, quarter-finals and semi-finals, the higher seed were the host team. However, the final was played at a neutral venue.
  - If tied, extra time would be played. If the score was still tied after extra time, a penalty shoot-out would be used to determine the winners.

==== Bracket ====
Round of 16
River Plate (p)	2 (4)
San Lorenzo	2 (3)
Vélez Sarsfield	0
Gimnasia y Esgrima (LP)	1
Rosario Central	3
Independiente	1
Estudiantes (LP)	0
Racing	1
Argentinos Juniors	2
Lanús	0
Boca Juniors	2
Huracán (a.e.t.)	3
Talleres (C)	0
Belgrano	1
Independiente Rivadavia	1
Unión	2

Quarter-finals
River Plate	2
Gimnasia y Esgrima (LP)	0
Rosario Central (a.e.t.)	2
Racing	1
Argentinos Juniors (a.e.t.)	1
Huracán	0
Belgrano	2
Unión	0

Semi-finals
River Plate	1
Rosario Central	0
Argentinos Juniors	1 (3)
Belgrano (p)	1 (4)

Final
River Plate	2
Belgrano	3

==== Round of 16 ====
9 May 2026	Talleres (C)	0–1	Belgrano	Córdoba
16:30		Report	González Metilli 47'	Stadium: Mario Alberto Kempes; Referee: Darío Herrera

9 May 2026	Boca Juniors	2–3 (a.e.t.)	Huracán	Buenos Aires
19:00	Giménez 86'; Romero 115'	Report	Gil 4'; Romero 93' (pen.), 102' (pen.)	Stadium: La Bombonera; Referee: Pablo Echavarría

9 May 2026	Independiente Rivadavia	1–2	Unión	Mendoza
21:30	Sartori 69'	Report	Cuello 33'; Tarragona 48'	Stadium: Bautista Gargantini; Referee: Luis Lobo Medina

9 May 2026	Argentinos Juniors	2–0	Lanús	Buenos Aires
22:15 (Note: The match was delayed from 21:30 to 22:15 due to TV scheduling conflicts resulting from the Boca Juniors v Huracán match going into overtime.)	Álvarez 28'; Lescano 90+6'	Report		Stadium: Diego Armando Maradona; Referee: Leandro Rey Hilfer

10 May 2026	Rosario Central	3–1	Independiente	Rosario
15:00	Di María 45+1'; Cantizano 83'; Verón 90+1'	Report	Ávalos 35'	Stadium: Gigante de Arroyito; Referee: Yael Falcón Pérez

10 May 2026	Estudiantes (LP)	0–1	Racing	La Plata
17:00		Report	Sosa 89'	Stadium: Jorge Luis Hirschi; Referee: Sebastián Martínez

10 May 2026	River Plate	2–2 (a.e.t.) (4–3 p)	San Lorenzo	Buenos Aires
19:00	Acuña 54'; Quintero 120+1'	Report	Auzmendi 36'; López 93'	Stadium: Mâs Monumental; Referee: Sebastián Zunino
	Penalties
	Quintero (penalty scored); Galoppo (penalty missed); Salas (penalty scored); Páez (penalty missed); Montiel (penalty scored); Freitas (penalty scored)		(penalty scored) Insaurralde; (penalty scored) Corujo; (penalty scored) Herazo; (penalty missed) Rodríguez; (penalty missed) Perruzzi; (penalty missed) De Ritis

10 May 2026	Vélez Sarsfield	0–1	Gimnasia y Esgrima (LP)	Buenos Aires
21:30		Report	Torres 13' (pen.)	Stadium: José Amalfitani; Referee: Andrés Gariano

==== Quarter-finals ====
12 May 2026	Belgrano	2–0	Unión	Córdoba
19:00	Sánchez 65'; Hernandes 90+5'	Report		Stadium: El Gigante de Alberdi; Referee: Andrés Merlos

12 May 2026	Argentinos Juniors	1–0 (a.e.t.)	Huracán	Buenos Aires
21:30	Molina 94'	Report		Stadium: Diego Armando Maradona; Referee: Fernando Echenique

13 May 2026	Rosario Central	2–1 (a.e.t.)	Racing	Rosario
18:45 (Note: The match was brought forward from 19:00 to 18:45 to avoid scheduling conflicts with the River Plate v Gimnasia y Esgrima (LP) match on TV.)	Ávila 64'; Copetti 106'	Report	Zaracho 40'	Stadium: Gigante de Arroyito; Referee: Darío Herrera

13 May 2026	River Plate	2–0	Gimnasia y Esgrima (LP)	Buenos Aires
21:45 (Note: The match was delayed from 21:30 to 21:45 due to TV scheduling conflicts resulting from the Rosario Central v Racing match going into overtime.)	Driussi 27'; Martínez Quarta 65'	Report		Stadium: Mâs Monumental; Referee: Leandro Rey Hilfer

==== Semi-finals ====
16 May 2026	River Plate	1–0	Rosario Central	Buenos Aires
19:30	Colidio 61' (pen.)	Report		Stadium: Mâs Monumental; Referee: Nicolás Ramírez

17 May 2026	Argentinos Juniors	1–1 (a.e.t.) (3–4 p)	Belgrano	Buenos Aires
17:00	Jainikoski 7'	Report	Fernández 90+4'	Stadium: Diego Armando Maradona; Referee: Nazareno Arasa
	Penalties
	Verón (penalty missed); López Muñoz (penalty scored); Álvarez (penalty scored); Lozano (penalty scored); Florentín (penalty missed); Pérez (penalty missed)		(penalty missed) L. Zelarayán; (penalty missed) Vázquez; (penalty scored) Passerini; (penalty scored) Fernández; (penalty scored) Rigoni; (penalty scored) Hernandes

==== Final ====
24 May 2026
15:30

River Plate	2–3	Belgrano
Colidio 18'; Galván 59'	Report	Morales 26'; Fernández 85' (pen.), 88'

Estadio Mario Alberto Kempes, Córdoba
Referee: Yael Falcón Pérez

=== Statistics ===
==== Top goalscorers ====
Rank	Player	Club	Goals
1	(Paraguay) Gabriel Ávalos	Independiente	10
2	(Ecuador) Jordy Caicedo	Huracán	8
2	(Argentina) Cristian Tarragona	Unión	8
4	(Argentina) Marcelo Torres	Gimnasia y Esgrima (LP)	7
4	(Argentina) Fabrizio Sartori	Independiente Rivadavia	7
4	(Argentina) David Romero	Tigre	7
7	(Uruguay) Mauro Méndez	Banfield	6
7	(Paraguay) Junior Marabel	Sarmiento (J)	6
7	(Argentina) Florián Monzón	Vélez Sarsfield	6
10	(Argentina) Leandro Díaz	Atlético Tucumán	5
10	(Uruguay) Miguel Merentiel	Boca Juniors	5
10	(Uruguay) Matías Abaldo	Independiente	5
10	(Argentina) Alex Luna	Instituto	5
10	(Argentina) Dylan Aquino	Lanús	5
10	(Argentina) Facundo Colidio	River Plate	5
10	(Argentina) Sebastián Driussi	River Plate	5
10	(Argentina) Enzo Copetti	Rosario Central	5
10	(Argentina) Ángel Di María	Rosario Central	5

Source: AFA

==== Top assists ====
Rank	Player	Club	Assists
1	(Argentina) Lucas Passerini	Belgrano	6
1	(Argentina) Julián Palacios	Unión	6
3	(Argentina) Facundo Lencioni	Gimnasia y Esgrima (M)	5
3	(Colombia) Sebastián Villa	Independiente Rivadavia	5
3	(Chile) Diego Valdés	Vélez Sarsfield	5
6	(Syria) Ignacio Abraham	Banfield	4
6	(Argentina) Santiago López	Banfield	4
6	(Argentina) Aarón Molinas	Defensa y Justicia	4
6	(Colombia) Óscar Cortés	Huracán	4
6	(Paraguay) Gabriel Ávalos	Independiente	4
6	(Argentina) Rodrigo Atencio	Independiente Rivadavia	4
6	(Argentina) Gabriel Rojas	Racing	4
6	(Colombia) Jaminton Campaz	Rosario Central	4
6	(Argentina) Ángel Di María	Rosario Central	4

Source: AFA

== Torneo Clausura ==
The 2026 Torneo Clausura (officially the Torneo Clausura Mercado Libre 2026 for sponsorship reasons) is the second tournament of the 2026 season. It began on 23 July and will end on 12 December 2026.

=== Group stage ===
In the group stage, each group was played on a single round-robin basis. In addition, each team played two inter-zone matches: the first against its rival from the other zone, and the second, in the sixth round, against a second team determined by a draw. Teams were ranked according to the following criteria: 1. Points (3 points for a win, 1 point for a draw, and 0 points for a loss); 2. Goal difference; 3. Goals scored; 4. Head-to-head results; 5. Fair play ranking; 6. Draw.

The top eight teams of each group advanced to the round of 16. Teams in relegation or in the relegation play-offs would not be eligible to play in the final stages.

==== Standings ====
===== Zone A =====
Pos	Team	Pld	W	D	L	GF	GA	GD	Pts	Qualification
1	Instituto	16	10	4	2	26	15	+11	34	Advance to round of 16
2	Boca Juniors	16	9	6	1	24	14	+10	33	Advance to round of 16
3	Vélez Sarsfield	16	7	7	2	25	17	+8	28	Advance to round of 16
4	Defensa y Justicia	16	8	4	4	21	15	+6	28	Advance to round of 16
5	Lanús	16	7	5	4	19	12	+7	26	Advance to round of 16
6	Newell's Old Boys	16	5	8	3	16	13	+3	23	Advance to round of 16
7	Independiente	16	6	5	5	15	16	−1	23	Advance to round of 16
8	Gimnasia y Esgrima (M)	16	6	4	6	18	17	+1	22	Advance to round of 16
9	Unión	16	6	3	7	24	24	0	21	
10	Platense	16	5	5	6	18	20	−2	20	
11	San Lorenzo	16	5	4	7	9	16	−7	19	
12	Estudiantes (LP)	16	4	4	8	21	22	−1	16	
13	Talleres (C)	16	3	4	9	17	23	−6	13	
14	Deportivo Riestra	16	2	6	8	11	19	−8	12	
15	Central Córdoba (SdE)	16	2	5	9	12	26	−14	11	

Source: LPF

===== Zone B =====
Pos	Team	Pld	W	D	L	GF	GA	GD	Pts	Qualification
1	Rosario Central	16	10	4	2	26	12	+14	34	Advance to round of 16
2	Argentinos Juniors	16	9	4	3	20	14	+6	31	Advance to round of 16
3	Gimnasia y Esgrima (LP)	16	9	4	3	25	20	+5	31	Advance to round of 16
4	River Plate	16	8	2	6	21	14	+7	26	Advance to round of 16
5	Barracas Central	16	7	5	4	17	13	+4	26	Advance to round of 16
6	Belgrano	16	6	5	5	17	15	+2	23	Advance to round of 16
7	Independiente Rivadavia	16	6	5	5	21	24	−3	23	Advance to round of 16
8	Huracán	16	6	4	6	14	16	−2	22	Advance to round of 16
9	Sarmiento (J)	16	6	3	7	23	24	−1	21	
10	Tigre	16	5	4	7	16	16	0	19	
11	Atlético Tucumán	16	4	6	6	16	17	−1	18	
12	Racing	16	4	3	9	16	24	−8	15	
13	Banfield	16	3	6	7	18	25	−7	15	
14	Aldosivi	16	3	2	11	16	26	−10	11	
15	Estudiantes (RC)	16	2	3	11	10	23	−13	9	

Source: LPF

==== Results ====
In the group stage, teams played every other team in their group once (either home or away), plus two interzonal games, for a total of 16 rounds.

===== Zone A =====
Home \ Away	BOC	CCO	DYJ	DRI	EST	GME	IND	INS	LAN	NOB	PLA	SLO	TAL	UNI	VEL
Boca Juniors		3–1	1–0		1–0				1–0				2–1	3–0	1–1
Central Córdoba (SdE)			2–2		2–2		0–1	0–1	1–1			1–0			0–5
Defensa y Justicia				2–1		2–0	1–1	0–1		2–1	1–0	3–0			
Deportivo Riestra	3–0	1–1			2–0				0–3				0–3	1–1	1–1
Estudiantes (LP)			3–0			3–0	0–2	3–3		0–0	2–1	1–2			
Gimnasia y Esgrima (M)	2–2	1–0		0–0						1–0	1–2		3–1	2–0	
Independiente	0–1			2–1		0–3		1–4		1–0	0–1	1–1			
Instituto	2–2			1–0		1–0				2–2	2–1	1–0	3–1		
Lanús			1–0		2–1	1–1	1–3	0–1				1–0			2–0
Newell's Old Boys	2–2	2–1		2–0					0–0				1–0	1–1	1–1
Platense	1–1	2–0		1–1					0–1	0–1			0–4	2–2	
San Lorenzo	0–2			1–0		1–0				0–0	0–2		1–0	1–0	
Talleres (C)		0–0	1–2		1–1		0–0		0–3					2–1	1–3
Unión		1–2	0–2		3–1		1–2	3–2	2–1						2–0
Vélez Sarsfield			1–1		1–0	1–0	1–0	1–0			2–2	2–2			

Source: LPF
Legend: Blue = home team win; Yellow = draw; Red = away team win.

===== Zone B =====
Home \ Away	ALD	ARG	ATU	BAN	BAR	BEL	ERC	GLP	HUR	IRI	RAC	RIV	ROS	SAR	TIG
Aldosivi			1–0	3–1		1–0		1–2				0–2		1–3	0–0
Argentinos Juniors	2–1						3–0	1–1	0–2	1–0	2–1				2–1
Atlético Tucumán		1–2			2–3	0–0				0–0		1–2	2–3	1–2	
Banfield		0–1	2–2		1–1	0–2						2–3	1–1	3–2	
Barracas Central	1–0	0–0					2–1		2–0	0–1	2–0		0–1		
Belgrano		0–1			2–2		2–1		1–1	2–0		0–3	2–1		
Estudiantes (RC)	2–1		0–1	0–0				1–2			1–2			0–2	1–0
Gimnasia y Esgrima (LP)			1–1	2–2	2–0	2–1						1–0		2–0	2–1
Huracán	1–0		0–0	1–0			1–1	1–2			2–1				0–2
Independiente Rivadavia	4–3			3–1			2–1	1–1	2–1		3–1				2–2
Racing	2–1		1–2	0–1		0–2		2–1						3–1	1–3
River Plate		2–0			0–1		1–0		1–2	3–1	1–0		0–1		
Rosario Central	2–1	1–0					2–0	1–2	2–0	5–0	0–0				
Sarmiento (J)		2–3			1–1	1–1			2–0	2–1		1–1	1–2		
Tigre			0–1	1–2	0–0	0–0						1–0	0–1	1–0	

Source: LPF
Legend: Blue = home team win; Yellow = draw; Red = away team win.

===== Interzonal matches =====
Home	Score	Away
Defensa y Justicia	1–1	Aldosivi
Central Córdoba (SdE)	0–2	Atlético Tucumán
Deportivo Riestra	0–1	Barracas Central
San Lorenzo	0–2	Huracán
Estudiantes (LP)	4–0	Gimnasia y Esgrima (LP)
Unión	4–1	Sarmiento (J)
Rosario Central	1–1	Newell's Old Boys
Instituto	2–1	Estudiantes (RC)
Vélez Sarsfield	3–2	Tigre
Talleres (C)	0–1	Belgrano
Platense	1–1	Argentinos Juniors
Racing	1–1	Independiente
Banfield	1–1	Lanús
Boca Juniors	1–0	River Plate
Gimnasia y Esgrima (M)	1–1	Independiente Rivadavia

Home	Score	Away
Aldosivi	1–3	Unión
Estudiantes (RC)	0–0	San Lorenzo
Atlético Tucumán	0–0	Instituto
Gimnasia y Esgrima (LP)	2–3	Gimnasia y Esgrima (M)
Independiente	0–0	Independiente Rivadavia
Huracán	0–0	Deportivo Riestra
Newell's Old Boys	2–1	Banfield
Barracas Central	1–2	Platense
Sarmiento (J)	2–0	Estudiantes (LP)
Belgrano	1–2	Defensa y Justicia
River Plate	2–2	Vélez Sarsfield
Racing	1–1	Boca Juniors
Tigre	2–1	Central Córdoba (SdE)
Lanús	1–1	Argentinos Juniors
Talleres (C)	2–2	Rosario Central

Source: LPF
Legend: Blue = home team win; Yellow = draw; Red = away team win.

=== Final stages ===
Starting from the round of 16, the teams will play a single-elimination tournament on a single-leg basis with the following rules:

- In the round of 16, quarter-finals and semi-finals, the higher seed will be the host team. However, the final will be played at a neutral venue.
  - If tied, extra time will be played. If the score is still tied after extra time, a penalty shoot-out will be used to determine the champions.

==== Bracket ====
Round of 16
Instituto
Huracán
River Plate	3
Lanús	1
Vélez Sarsfield (p)	2 (3)
Belgrano	2 (1)
Argentinos Juniors	1
Independiente	2
Rosario Central	3
Gimnasia y Esgrima (M)	1
Defensa y Justicia	0
Barracas Central	1
Boca Juniors
Independiente Rivadavia
Gimnasia y Esgrima (LP)
Newell's Old Boys

Quarter-finals
River Plate
Vélez Sarsfield
Independiente
Rosario Central
Barracas Central

Semi-finals

Final

1. ^{†} Home team to be decided.

==== Round of 16 ====
20 November 2026	Vélez Sarsfield	2–2 (a.e.t.) (3–1 p)	Belgrano	Buenos Aires
20:00	Martínez 58'; Godoy 109'	Report	Hernandes 10'; Fernández 99'	Stadium: José Amalfitani; Referee: Yael Falcón Pérez
	Penalties
	Aliendro (penalty scored); Martínez (penalty scored); Arias (penalty missed); Godoy (penalty scored)		(penalty missed) L. Zelarayán; (penalty missed) González Metilli; (penalty scored) Fernández; (penalty missed) Spörle

21 November 2026	Defensa y Justicia	0–1	Barracas Central	Florencio Varela
15:00		Report	Briasco 29'	Stadium: Norberto "Tito" Tomaghello; Referee: Pablo Echavarría

21 November 2026	Argentinos Juniors	1–2	Independiente	Buenos Aires
17:00	Porcel 46'	Report	Meza 38', 74' (pen.)	Stadium: Diego Armando Maradona; Referee: Jorge Baliño

22 November 2026	Rosario Central	3–1	Gimnasia y Esgrima (M)	Rosario
16:00	Campaz 5'; Copetti 7'; Carrera 39' (o.g.)	Report	Lencioni 90'	Stadium: Gigante de Arroyito; Referee: Leandro Rey Hilfer

22 November 2026	River Plate	3–1	Lanús	Buenos Aires
19:00	Almada 14' (pen.), 88'; Andrada 68'	Report	Carrera 31'	Stadium: Monumental; Referee: Pablo Dóvalo

22 November 2026	Instituto	P1	Huracán	Córdoba
22:00		Report		Stadium: Monumental Presidente Perón; Referee: Darío Herrera

23 November 2026	Gimnasia y Esgrima (LP)	P6	Newell's Old Boys	La Plata
17:00		Report		Stadium: Juan Carmelo Zerillo; Referee: Nicolás Ramírez

25 November 2026	Boca Juniors	P3	Independiente Rivadavia	Buenos Aires
21:00		Report		Stadium: La Bombonera; Referee: Luis Lobo Medina

==== Quarter-finals ====
Winners P1	C1	River Plate

Rosario Central	C2	Barracas Central	Rosario
			Stadium: Gigante de Arroyito

Winners P3	C3	Winners P6

Vélez Sarsfield	C4	Independiente	Buenos Aires
			Stadium: José Amalfitani

1. ^{†} Home team to be decided.

==== Semi-finals ====
Winners C1	S1	Winners C4

Winners C2	S2	Winners C3

1. ^{†} Home team to be decided.

==== Final ====
12 December 2026

Winners S1	F	Winners S2

Estadio Único Diego Armando Maradona, La Plata
1. ^{†} Administrative home team to be decided.

=== Statistics ===
As of 21 November 2026

==== Top goalscorers ====
Rank	Player	Club	Goals
1	(Paraguay) Ronaldo Martínez	Talleres (C)/Vélez Sarsfield	11
2	(Italy) Agustín Módica	Gimnasia y Esgrima (M)	10
3	(Argentina) Cristian Tarragona	Unión	9
4	(Paraguay) Junior Marabel	Sarmiento (J)	8
5	(Slovenia) Andrés Vombergar	Aldosivi	7
5	(Paraguay) Álex Arce	Independiente Rivadavia	7
7	(Argentina) Agustín Auzmendi	Gimnasia y Esgrima (LP)	6
7	(Ecuador) Jordy Caicedo	Huracán	6
7	(Argentina) Maximiliano Meza	Independiente	6
7	(Paraguay) José Florentín	Independiente Rivadavia	6
7	(Argentina) Ángel Di María	Rosario Central	6

Source: AFA

==== Top assists ====
Rank	Player	Club	Assists
1	(Argentina) David Barbona	Defensa y Justicia	5
1	(Uruguay) Juan Manuel Gutiérrez	Defensa y Justicia	5
3	(Argentina) Lautaro Godoy	Atlético Tucumán	4
3	(Armenia) Lucas Zelarayán	Belgrano	4
3	(Argentina) Lautaro Blanco	Boca Juniors	4
3	(Argentina) Ignacio Fernández	Gimnasia y Esgrima (LP)	4
3	(Argentina) Santiago Montiel	Independiente	4
3	(Argentina) Matías Fernández	Independiente Rivadavia	4
3	(Argentina) Alex Luna	Instituto	4
3	(Argentina) Jabes Saralegui	Tigre	4
3	(Argentina) Matías Pellegrini	Vélez Sarsfield	4

Source: AFA

== Aggregate table ==
=== International qualification ===
The 2026 Torneo Apertura champions, 2026 Torneo Clausura champions and 2026 Copa Argentina champions will earn a berth to the 2027 Copa Libertadores. The remaining berths to the 2027 Copa Libertadores as well as the ones to the 2027 Copa Sudamericana will be determined by an aggregate table from the group stages of the 2026 Torneo Apertura and 2026 Torneo Clausura. The top three teams in the aggregate table not already qualified for any international tournament will qualify for the Copa Libertadores, while the next six teams will qualify for the Copa Sudamericana.

=== Relegation ===
In this season, the bottom team of the aggregate table was relegated to the 2027 Primera Nacional. If two or more teams were level on points, extra matches would be played to decide which team would be relegated.

=== Campeón de Liga ===
The team with the most points in the aggregate table was awarded the league title of "Campeón de Liga".

Pos	Team	Pld	W	D	L	GF	GA	GD	Pts	Qualification or relegation
1	Boca Juniors (C, Q)	32	17	12	3	46	23	+23	63	Qualification for Copa Libertadores group stage (Note: Belgrano and Boca Juniors qualified for the Copa Libertadores group stage by winning the 2026 Torneo Apertura and the 2026 Copa Sudamericana, respectively. Platense qualified for the Copa Libertadores group stage as 2026 Copa Argentina champions or runners-up.)
2	Rosario Central (Q)	32	18	8	6	46	28	+18	62	Qualification for Copa Libertadores group stage
3	Argentinos Juniors (Q)	32	17	9	6	37	27	+10	60	Qualification for Copa Libertadores group stage
4	Independiente Rivadavia (T)	32	16	9	7	50	39	+11	57	Qualification for Copa Libertadores second stage
5	Gimnasia y Esgrima (LP) (X)	32	17	6	9	44	39	+5	57	Qualification for Copa Sudamericana group stage
6	Vélez Sarsfield (X)	32	14	14	4	43	29	+14	56	Qualification for Copa Sudamericana group stage
7	River Plate (X)	32	17	4	11	43	26	+17	55	Qualification for Copa Sudamericana group stage
8	Instituto (X)	32	16	7	9	43	32	+11	55	Qualification for Copa Sudamericana group stage
9	Lanús (Q)	32	13	11	8	37	27	+10	50	Qualification for Copa Sudamericana group stage
10	Belgrano (Q)	32	13	10	9	34	28	+6	49	Qualification for Copa Libertadores group stage
11	Estudiantes (LP) (X)	32	13	8	11	40	29	+11	47	Qualification for Copa Sudamericana group stage
12	Barracas Central	32	12	11	9	32	28	+4	47	
13	Independiente	32	12	11	9	39	36	+3	47 (Note: Fair play points: Independiente 877; Defensa y Justicia 870)	
14	Defensa y Justicia	32	12	11	9	39	36	+3	47	
15	Huracán	32	11	11	10	31	29	+2	44	
16	Unión	32	11	9	12	48	44	+4	42	
17	Gimnasia y Esgrima (M)	32	11	8	13	32	39	−7	41	
18	San Lorenzo	32	10	11	11	23	30	−7	41	
19	Sarmiento (J)	32	12	4	16	36	44	−8	40	
20	Tigre	32	9	12	11	34	31	+3	39	
21	Talleres (C)	32	10	9	13	34	36	−2	39	
22	Newell's Old Boys	32	8	14	10	31	40	−9	38	
23	Racing	32	9	9	14	33	39	−6	36	
24	Platense (Q)	32	8	12	12	28	35	−7	36	Qualification for Copa Libertadores group stage
25	Banfield	32	8	9	15	35	44	−9	33	
26	Atlético Tucumán	32	7	11	14	31	37	−6	32	
27	Central Córdoba (SdE)	32	6	9	17	23	47	−24	27	
28	Deportivo Riestra	32	3	14	15	16	31	−15	23	
29	Aldosivi (R)	32	3	10	19	22	45	−23	19	Relegation to Primera Nacional (Note: Estudiantes (RC) were relegated based on coefficients.)
30	Estudiantes (RC) (R)	32	3	5	24	15	47	−32	14	Relegation to Primera Nacional

Source: AFA
Rules for classification: 1) points; 2) goal difference; 3) goals scored; 4) fair play ranking; 5) drawing of lots.
(C) Champions; (Q) Qualified for the phase indicated; (R) Relegated; (T) Qualified, but not yet for the particular phase indicated; (X) Assured of Copa Sudamericana, but may still qualify for Copa Libertadores

== Relegation based on coefficients ==
In addition to the relegation based on the aggregate table, one team was relegated at the end of the season based on coefficients, which took into consideration the points obtained by the clubs during the present season (aggregate table points) and the two previous seasons (only seasons at the top flight were counted). The total tally was then divided by the number of games played in the top flight over those three seasons, and an average was calculated. The team with the worst average at the end of the season was relegated to Primera Nacional.

Pos	Team	2024 Pts	2025 Pts	2026 Pts	Total Pts	Total Pld	Avg	Relegation
1	Boca Juniors	67	62	63	192	105	1.829	
2	River Plate	70	53	55	178	105	1.695	
3	Rosario Central	47	66	62	175	105	1.667	
4	Argentinos Juniors	56	57	60	173	105	1.648	
5	Vélez Sarsfield	76	40	56	172	105	1.638	
6	Lanús	59	50	50	159	105	1.514	
7	Racing	70	53	36	159	105	1.514	
8	Independiente	63	47	47	157	105	1.495	
9	Huracán	62	47	44	153	105	1.457	
10	Estudiantes (LP)	63	42	47	152	105	1.448	
11	Independiente Rivadavia	46	43	57	146	105	1.39	
12	Barracas Central	49	49	47	145	105	1.381	
13	Talleres (C)	72	34	39	145	105	1.381	
14	Defensa y Justicia	58	38	47	143	105	1.362	
15	Gimnasia y Esgrima (LP)	48	38	57	143	105	1.362	
16	Instituto	53	34	55	142	105	1.352	
17	Unión	60	39	42	141	105	1.343	
18	San Lorenzo	45	51	41	137	105	1.305	
19	Belgrano	49	37	49	135	105	1.286	
20	Gimnasia y Esgrima (M)	—	—	41	41	32	1.281	
21	Platense	57	35	36	128	105	1.219	
22	Tigre	39	49	39	127	105	1.21	
23	Deportivo Riestra	48	52	23	123	105	1.171	
24	Newell's Old Boys	49	33	38	120	105	1.143	
25	Atlético Tucumán	50	34	32	116	105	1.105	
26	Central Córdoba (SdE)	42	42	27	111	105	1.057	
27	Sarmiento (J)	35	35	40	110	105	1.048	
28	Banfield	41	35	33	109	105	1.038	
29	Aldosivi	—	33	19	52	64	0.813	
30	Estudiantes (RC) (R)	—	—	14	14	32	0.438	Relegation to Primera Nacional

Source: AFA

== Attendances ==
The 2026 Torneo Apertura attracted approximately 283,000 spectators per matchday, according to the Argentine Football Association. Below is a table with the average home league attendances:

Pos	Club	Average attendance
1	River Plate	83,416
2	Boca Juniors	53,782
3	Talleres (C)	40,284
4	Racing	38,436
5	Rosario Central	32,617
6	Independiente	30,195
7	San Lorenzo	26,843
8	Newell's Old Boys	24,716
9	Belgrano	24,583
10	Estudiantes (LP)	21,683
11	Huracán	19,847
12	Vélez Sarsfield	18,926
13	Atlético Tucumán	18,247
14	Gimnasia y Esgrima (LP)	17,412
15	Unión	15,186
16	Independiente Rivadavia	14,826
17	Instituto	13,672
18	Banfield	12,684
19	Tigre	11,416
20	Argentinos Juniors	10,647
21	Aldosivi	9,382
22	Platense	8,716
23	Lanús	7,493
24	Gimnasia y Esgrima (M)	6,924
25	Central Córdoba (SdE)	6,827
26	Defensa y Justicia	6,183
27	Sarmiento (J)	5,746
28	Estudiantes (RC)	4,682
29	Deportivo Riestra	2,837
30	Barracas Central	1,024

== See also ==
- 2026 Copa Argentina
- 2026 Primera Nacional
