= Clásico cordobés =

Football rivalry between Argentine clubs Belgrano and Talleres

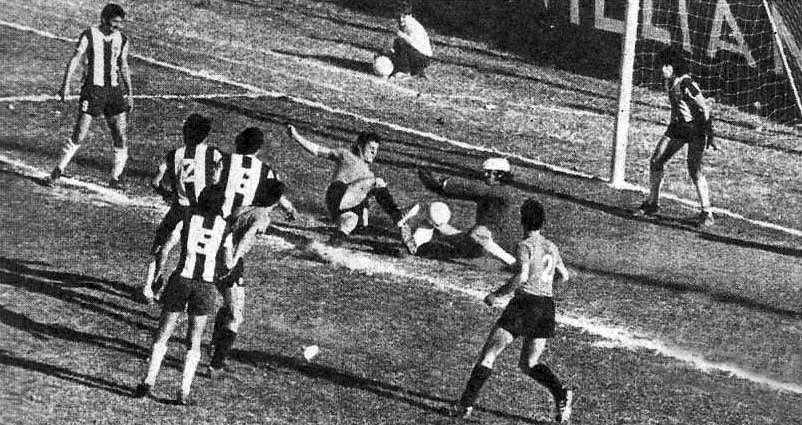
- A Cordoban Derby in 1974 at Gigante de Alberdi

- Belgrano Talleres
- Other names: Superclásico cordobés (Cordoban Superderby)
- Location: Córdoba, Argentina
- First meeting: 17 May 1914 (Cordoban League); Belgrano 1–0 Talleres
- Latest meeting: 4 Oct 2026 (Primera División); Talleres 0–1 Belgrano
- Next meeting: None
- Stadiums: El Gigante de Alberdi (Belgrano); La Boutique (Talleres)

Statistics
- Total meetings: 406
- Most wins: Talleres (96)
- Top scorer: Miguel A. Romero (19 goals)
- All-time series: (Includes friendly matches); Belgrano: 135; Draw: 133; Talleres: 133
- Largest victory: Belgrano 8–1 Talleres (29 November 1914); Talleres 7–0 Belgrano (21 May 1950)
- Largest goal scoring: Belgrano 4–4 Talleres (2 Jul 1944)
- Longest unbeaten streak: Talleres (20 matches)
- Current unbeaten streak: Talleres (8 matches)

The Cordoban Derby (In spanish: Clásico cordobés) is the football match in Argentina between two biggest clubs of the Córdoba Province, Belgrano and Talleres. It is one of the oldest football derbies in Argentina, with its first match held in 1914 and won by Belgrano 1–0.

With 257 official matches played, Talleres has the most wins with 96.

== Highlights ==
- The first match between both clubs was played on 17 May 1914, being won by Belgrano 1–0.
- The largest Belgrano's win in the history was a 8–1 in Liga Cordobesa, on 29 November 1914.
- The largest win in an AFA competition was on 16 November 1996, when Talleres beat Belgrano 5–0 in the 1996–97 Primera B Nacional season. All the goals were scored by José Zelaya.
- On 15 July 1998 Talleres won the 1997–98 Primera B Nacional championship after beating Belgrano in the promotion playoff decided via penalty shoot-out after a 2–2 aggregate score. This result allowed Talleres not only to be crowned champion but to return to the top division of Argentine football. It is also regarded as the most important final in the history of football in Córdoba Province.
- In domestic cups level, Talleres and Belgrano played only once, on 13 March 2013 in the 2012–13 Copa Argentina. Talleres (who competed in the third division by then) eliminated Belgrano after beating them 1–0 in knockout stage.
- On 9 May 2026 Belgrano beat Talleres by 1–0 as away team in the Round of 16 of the 2026 Torneo Apertura, it was the first time a Cordoban Derby had been played in a Primera Divisón knockout stage.

== Statistics ==
Only official matches included: As of 24 February 2024

| Type | Tournament | Games played | Talleres wins | Draws | Belgrano wins | Talleres goals | Belgrano goals |
|---|---|---|---|---|---|---|---|
| Regional | Liga Cordobesa | 212 | 85 | 63 | 64 | 390 | 344 |
| Regional | Unión Cordobesa | 2 | 0 | 0 | 2 | 4 | 7 |
| Regional | Total Regional | 214 | 85 | 63 | 66 | 394 | 351 |
AFA
| AFA | Primera División | 24 | 5 | 14 | 5 | 21 | 19 |
| AFA | Primera B Nacional | 16 | 5 | 6 | 5 | 16 | 14 |
| AFA | Copa Argentina | 1 | 1 | 0 | 0 | 1 | 0 |
| AFA | Copa de la Liga Profesional | 2 | 0 | 2 | 0 | 2 | 2 |
| AFA | Total AFA | 43 | 11 | 22 | 10 | 40 | 35 |
| Total | Overall | 257 | 96 | 85 | 76 | 434 | 386 |

=== Records ===
In official matches:

==== Appearances ====
| Player | Team | App. |
|---|---|---|
| (Argentina) Domingo Bertolino | Talleres | 34 |
| (Argentina) Roberto Ortíz | Talleres | 28 |
| (Argentina) Alfonso Paolucci | Talleres | 27 |
| (Argentina) Jorge Campos | Talleres | 27 |
| (Argentina) Antonio Gambino | Talleres | 27 |
| (Argentina) Luis A. Ludueña | Talleres | 23 |
| (Argentina) Miguel Laciar | Belgrano | 23 |
| (Argentina) Ignacio Romero | Belgrano | 23 |

==== Goalscorers (all competitions) ====
| Player | Team | Goals |
|---|---|---|
| (Argentina) Miguel A. Romero | Talleres | 19 |
| (Argentina) Rogelio Cuello | Talleres | 17 |
| (Argentina) Roberto Luque | Belgrano | 17 |
| (Argentina) José Lascano | Belgrano | 15 |
| (Argentina) Amable López | Talleres | 13 |
| (Argentina) Justo Coria | Belgrano | 12 |
| (Argentina) Dardo Lucero | Belgrano | 12 |
| (Argentina) Francisco García | Belgrano | 11 |
| (Argentina) Santiago Salas | Belgrano | 11 |

==== Goalscorers (AFA competitions) ====
| Player | Team | Goals |
|---|---|---|
| (Argentina) José Zelaya | Talleres | 6 |
| (Argentina) Rodrigo Astudillo | Talleres | 3 |
| (Argentina) Luis Fabián Artime | Belgrano | 3 |
| (Argentina) Mariano Campodónico | Belgrano | 3 |
| (Argentina) Cristian Carnero | Belgrano | 3 |

== Comparative charts ==
Updated to season 2017–18.

| Statistics | Belgrano | Talleres |
|---|---|---|
| Primera División seasons | 30 | 37 |
| Primera B Nacional seasons | 19 | 11 |
| Torneo Federal A seasons | – | 6 |
| All time Primera División table | 24th | 21st |
| Primera División best performance | 3rd position | 2nd position |
| Primera División top scorers | 2 | 3 |
| Primera División titles | 0 | 0 |
| Other national titles | 2 | 7 |
| International titles (participations) | 0 (4) | 1 (7) |
| Regional titles | 59 | 63 |
| Total titles | 61 | 71 |

| Team | First | Second | Third | Participations |
|---|---|---|---|---|
Primera División
| Belgrano | 0 | 0 | 1 | 30 |
| Talleres | 0 | 2 | 3 | 37 |
Primera B Nacional
| Belgrano | 1 | 1 | 3 | 19 |
| Talleres | 2 | 2 | 0 | 11 |
Torneo Federal A
| Belgrano | – | – | – | 0 |
| Talleres | 2 | 0 | 0 | 6 |
Copa Argentina
| Belgrano | 0 | 0 | 1 | 8 |
| Talleres | 0 | 2 | 0 | 10 |
