= Walter Zunino =

Argentine football manager and former player

Personal information
- Full name: Walter Adrián Zunino
- Date of birth: 13 November 1981 (age 44)
- Place of birth: Buenos Aires, Argentina
- Height: 1.77 m (5 ft 10 in)
- Position: Left-back

Youth career
- Platense

Senior career*
Years	Team	Apps	(Gls)
1999–2000	Platense	36	(6)
2000	River Plate Montevideo	3	(0)
2000–2001	Vicenza	0	(0)
2001–2002	Nueva Chicago	0	(0)
2002–2003	Platense	8	(0)
2003–2005	El Porvenir	69	(4)
2005–2006	Instituto	26	(1)
2006–2007	Olimpo	10	(0)
2007–2008	Atlético Rafaela	27	(0)
2008–2010	Platense	36	(3)
2010–2011	Gimnasia Jujuy	23	(1)
2011–2013	Aldosivi	67	(5)
2013–2015	Almirante Brown	60	(2)
2016	Agropecuario	18	(0)
2016–2017	El Porvenir	49	(7)
Total		442	(26)

Managerial career
- 2018: Chacarita Juniors (assistant)
- 2019–2021: San Martín de Tucumán (assistant)
- 2021: Ferro Carril Oeste (assistant)
- 2022: Godoy Cruz (assistant)
- 2023–2024: Atlético Tucumán (assistant)
- 2024–2025: Platense (assistant)
- 2026: Platense
- * Club domestic league appearances and goals

Walter Adrián Zunino (born 13 November 1981) is an Argentine professional football manager and former player who played as a left-back.

== Playing career ==
Born in Buenos Aires, Zunino began his career with Platense in 1999, before moving to Uruguayan side River Plate Montevideo in the following year. In 2001, after a period at Italian club Vicenza, he returned to his home country with Primera División side Nueva Chicago, but did not play.

In 2002, Zunino returned to his first club Platense, now in the Primera B Metropolitana, but joined Primera B Nacional club El Porvenir in the following year. He moved to Instituto in the top tier in 2005, where he featured regularly.

In the following years, Zunino represented second division sides Olimpo, Atlético Rafaela, Platense, Gimnasia Jujuy, Aldosivi and Almirante Brown. On 6 February 2016, he signed for Agropecuario.

In 2016, Zunino returned to El Porvenir, and retired with the club in December 2017, aged 36.

== Managerial career ==
Immediately after retiring, Zunino joined Sebastián Pena's staff at Chacarita Juniors, as his assistant. In the following year, he became the assistant of Favio Orsi and Sergio Gómez at San Martín de Tucumán, and subsequently followed the duo to Ferro Carril Oeste, Godoy Cruz, Atlético Tucumán and Platense.

On 23 November 2025, Zunino was appointed manager of Platense for the upcoming season. The following 4 August, he left by mutual consent.

== Managerial statistics ==
As of 3 August 2026

Team	From	To	Record							
Team	From	To	M	W	D	L	GF	GA	GD	Win %
Platense	23 November 2025	4 August 2026	28	7	10	11	23	32	−9	25.00
