= Gustavo Benítez =

Gustavo Benítez may refer to:

- Gustavo Benítez (footballer, born 1953), Paraguayan defender
- Gustavo Benítez (footballer, born 1986), Argentine centre-back
