= Artime =

Artime is a Spanish surname. Notable people with the surname include:

- Ángel Fernández Artime (born 1960), Spanish Roman Catholic cardinal
- Manuel Artime (1932–1977), Cuban anti-Fidel Castro Guerilla
- Luis Artime (born 1938), Argentine footballer
- Luis Fabián Artime (born 1965), Argentine footballer
