= Club Atlético Belgrano =

Argentine football club

Belgrano
- Full name: Club Atlético Belgrano
- Nicknames: El Pirata (The Pirate); El Celeste (The Sky-blue); La "B" (The B)
- Founded: 19 March 1905; 121 years ago
- Ground: Estadio Julio César Villagra
- Capacity: 38,000.
- Chairman: Luis Fabián Artime
- Manager: Ricardo Zielinski
- League: Primera División
- 2025: 20th of 30th (2026 Torneo Apertura winners)
- Website: belgrano.com.ar
Home colours	Away colours	Third colours

Club Atlético Belgrano (Spanish pronunciation: [ˈkluβ aˈtletiko βelˈɣɾano]; mostly known simply as Belgrano [belˈɣɾano] or Belgrano de Córdoba [belˈɣɾano ðe ˈkoɾðoβa]) is an Argentine sports club from the city of Córdoba, best known for its football team, which currently plays in the Primera División, the first level of the Argentine football league system, after being promoted from the 2022 Primera Nacional.

Belgrano's stadium is called Julio César Villagra and is also known as El Gigante de Alberdi; it is located in Barrio Alberdi, in the central area of the city of Córdoba; it has a capacity of 35,000 spectators. The club occasionally uses the Estadio Mario Alberto Kempes, which has a capacity of 57,000 spectators.

== History ==
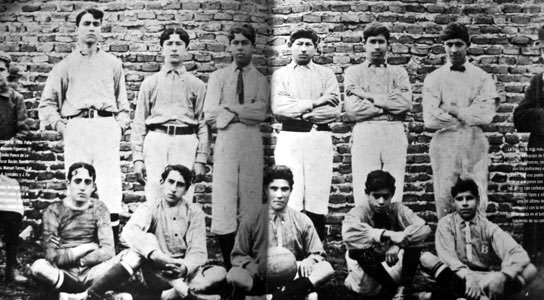
First photo ever of a Belgrano team, 1906

Belgrano was founded on 19 March 1905 in Barrio Alberdi. It was named in commemoration of the Argentine historical figure Manuel Belgrano, and its colours were taken from the flag of Argentina, created by Belgrano himself. Arturo Orgaz was named as the first president.

The club settled on a land given by Ramón Moreno. Days after its foundation, Belgrano started to play friendly matches against neighboring clubs; one of them was vs. an homonymous club and the winner earned the right to keep the name. As Belgrano de Alberdi won the match 2–1, they could retain their name.

In 1913 Belgrano was one of the founding members of "Nueva Federación Cordobesa de Fútbol", predecessor to "Liga Cordobesa". One year later, the team played the first Clásico cordobés vs. Talleres, a match held on 17 May and suspended after the players of Talleres abandoned the field in protest after a goal scored by Belgrano forward José Lascano. Some months later, Belgrano won the clásico 8–1, which remains as the largest win between both clubs.

In 1933 the Liga Cordobesa became professional, with Belgrano winning its first title of the new era. The 1930s marked a strong supremacy of the team, winning all the championships between 1933 and 1937 with the exception of 1934 (won by Talleres). In 1938 Belgrano toured Bolivia, winning 3 of 4 matches (1 draw), scoring 18 goals. The highlight of that tour was a 6–0 win over Club Bolívar.

Between 1940 and 1957 Belgrano won 14 league titles, with a powerful attacking line nicknamed Quinteto de Oro. It was formed by Héctor Carrizo, Justo Coria, Oscar Mona Peralta, Dardo Lucero, and Francisco García, which is regarded as the best group of forwards in the history of football in Córdoba.

In 1968, the club participated for the first time in a national tournament, finishing ninth in the table. In 1980, Belgrano won the Copa Cordoba, which was an international tournament consisting of Fluminense from Brazil, Servette from Switzerland, Budapest Honvéd from Hungary, and Instituto and Talleres from Cordoba. In the final, at Estadio Mario Alberto Kempes, Belgrano defeated Honved in extra time to win the title.

In 1991, Belgrano achieved promotion to the Primera Division for the first time, being there for five years until being relegated in 1996. In 1998, the club was promoted again, but in 2001 the club played the relegation playout and barely achieved permanence based on sporting advantage after a draw to Quilmes on aggregate. The following year, things did not improve and Belgrano were relegated.

Since then the club has spent various seasons in both the first and second divisions, but there have been some notable promotions, such as the promotion achieved in the 2011 season. Belgrano had a good start to the 2011 season, finishing fourth in the league and qualifying to the promotion playoffs. Powerhouse River Plate were having one of the worst seasons of its history and were sent to the relegation playoff against Belgrano. Despite River's poor season, many people did not think it was possible for River to get relegated, mainly due to the "sporting advantage" rule existing at the time. However, on 26 June 2011, Belgrano drew 1–1 with River at Estadio Monumental and sent the club down to the second division for the first time in club history, after having won the first leg 2–0 a few days earlier. This caused massive riots after the match, and this match became one of the most notable of Argentine football and football history.

On 24 May 2026, Belgrano captured their first-ever Primera División title, defeating River Plate 3–2 in the Torneo Apertura final. Nicolás Fernández scored twice in the closing minutes to seal a remarkable comeback, delivering the club its first league championship in 121 years.

== Players ==
=== Current squad ===
As of 23 September 2026

Note: Flags indicate national team as defined under FIFA eligibility rules; some limited exceptions apply. Players may hold more than one non-FIFA nationality.

No.	Pos.	Nation	Player
2	DF	ARG	Alexis Maldonado
3	DF	ARG	Adrián Spörle
5	MF	ARG	Santiago Longo
9	FW	ARG	Lucas Passerini
10	MF	ARM	Lucas Zelarayán (captain)
11	MF	ARG	Francisco González Metilli
13	DF	ARG	Álvaro Ocampo
14	DF	ARG	Leonardo Morales
16	DF	URU	Federico Ricca
17	DF	ARG	Lisandro López
20	MF	ARG	Franco Vázquez
21	MF	ARG	Adrián Sánchez

No.	Pos.	Nation	Player
22	FW	ARG	Nicolás Fernández
23	GK	ARG	Manuel Vicentini
24	MF	ARG	Emiliano Rigoni
25	GK	URU	Thiago Cardozo (on loan from Unión de Santa Fe)
26	DF	PAR	Alcides Benítez
28	GK	ARG	Matías Daniele
29	FW	ARG	Agustín Melano
30	MF	ARG	Gonzalo Zelarayán
37	FW	ARG	Lautaro Gutiérrez
45	DF	ARG	Agustín Falcón
51	MF	ARG	Ramiro Hernandes
53	MF	ARG	Juan Velázquez

=== Reserve squad ===
Note: Flags indicate national team as defined under FIFA eligibility rules; some limited exceptions apply. Players may hold more than one non-FIFA nationality.

No.	Pos.	Nation	Player
4	DF	ARG	Agustín Griguol
15	MF	ARG	Ramiro Tulián
19	MF	ARG	Santino Gatti
43	DF	ARG	Jeremías Biani

No.	Pos.	Nation	Player
44	MF	ARG	Thiago Charras
45	DF	ARG	Agustín Falcón
60	GK	ARG	Santiago Ferez

==== Out on loan ====
Note: Flags indicate national team as defined under FIFA eligibility rules; some limited exceptions apply. Players may hold more than one non-FIFA nationality.

No.	Pos.	Nation	Player
2	DF	ARG	Elías Calderón (at Central Norte until 31 December 2026)
7	FW	PER	Bryan Reyna (at Universitario until 31 December 2026)
7	FW	CHI	Lautaro Pastrán (at Colo-Colo until 31 December 2026)
8	MF	ARG	Francisco Monticelli (at Racing (Córdoba) until 31 December 2026)
10	MF	CHI	Matías Marín (at La Serena until 31 December 2026)
10	MF	ARG	Ignacio Tapia (at Ñublense until 31 December 2026)
12	FW	ARG	Ulises Sánchez (at Gimnasia-M until 31 December 2026)
13	DF	ARG	Nicolás Meriano (at Banfield until 31 December 2026)

No.	Pos.	Nation	Player
17	MF	ARG	Tiago Cravero (at Central Córdoba until 31 December 2026)
31	MF	ARG	Gerónimo Tomasetti (at Temperley until 31 December 2026)
34	MF	ARG	Gerónimo Heredia (at Delfín until 31 December 2026)
35	DF	ARG	Francisco Facello (at Chacarita Juniors until 31 December 2026)
39	GK	ARG	Juan Strumia (at Godoy Cruz until 31 December 2026)
43	FW	ARG	Franco Rami (at Ñublense until 31 December 2026)
45	MF	ARG	Agustín Baldi (at Tristán Suárez until 31 December 2026)

=== Current coaching staff ===
Position	Staff
Head coach	(Argentina) Ricardo Zielinski
Assistant coach	(Argentina) Emmanuel Depaoli
Assistant coach	(Argentina) Luciano Guiñazú
Assistant coach	(Argentina) Juan Carlos Olave
Fitness coach	(Uruguay) Alfonso Meoni
Fitness coach	(Argentina) Fernando Yábale
Goalkeeping coach	(Argentina) Marcelo Misetich
Doctor	(Argentina) José Luna
Doctor	(Argentina) Sergio Luque
Doctor	(Argentina) Dr. Javier Acosta
Kinesiologist	(Argentina) Pablo Chavero
Kinesiologist	(Argentina) Tomás Ríos Ferreyra
Kinesiologist	(Argentina) Marcio Bordón
Kinesiologist	(Argentina) Iván Molina
Nutritionist	(Argentina) Tatiana Medina
Nutritionist	(Argentina) Agostina Origlia
Nutritionist	(Argentina) Maximo Gavier
Kit man	(Argentina) Chino Díaz
Kit man	(Argentina) Hugo Colchi
Kit man	(Argentina) Chicho Murúa
Kit man	(Argentina) Pato Alarcón

Last updated: 4 May 2025
Source: Cuerpo Técnico Plantel AFA

== Honours ==
=== National ===
- Primera División (1): 2026 Apertura
- Primera Nacional (1): 2022
- Torneo del Interior (Note: Tournament that served as qualification for the Primera B Nacional championship.) (1): 1986 (Note: Title shared with other teams.)
- Torneo Regional (1): 1985-86

=== Regional ===
- Liga Cordobesa de Fútbol (27): 1913, 1914, 1917, 1919, 1920, 1929, 1930, 1931, 1932, 1933, 1935, 1936, 1937, 1940, 1946, 1947, 1950, 1952, 1954, 1955, 1957, 1970, 1971, 1973, 1984, 1985, 2013
- Segunda División LCF (3): 1908, 1909, 1910
- Campeonato Provincial ACF (3): 1983, 1984, 1985
- Campeonato Clasificación LCF (6): 1968, 1970, 1971, 1972, 1973, 1974
- Campeonato Preparación LCF (5): 1936, 1941, 1943, 1947, 1949
- Copa Reina Victoria (3): 1914, 1916, 1917
- Campeonato Sidral LCF (1): 1931
- Copa Gath & Cháves (1): 1924
- Campeonato de la Bandera (1):1916
- Campeonato Vélez Sársfield (1): 1915
- Campeonato Unión Cordobesa (1): 1956
- Campeonato Estímulo (1): 1914
- Copa Argentina (1): 1914
- Campeonato Iniciación LCF (1): 1962
- Campeonato Clausura LCF (1): 1966
- Campeonato Selección (1): 1973
- Campeonato Selectivo (1): 1975
- Campeonato Apertura LCF (1): 1978
