= Juan Cruz Villagra =

Argentine professional footballer

Personal information
- Date of birth: 3 January 2000 (age 26)
- Place of birth: Villa Yapeyú, Argentina
- Position: Centre-forward

Team information
- Current team: Douglas Haig (on loan from Defensa y Justicia)

Youth career
- 2015–2020: Defensa y Justicia

Senior career*
Years	Team	Apps	(Gls)
2020–	Defensa y Justicia	5	(0)
2021	→ San Martín SJ (loan)	19	(1)
2022	→ Guillermo Brown (loan)	4	(0)
2022–	→ Douglas Haig (loan)	6	(0)
- * Club domestic league appearances and goals as of 17:44, 26 July 2022 (UTC)

Juan Cruz Villagra (born 3 January 2000) is an Argentine professional footballer who plays as a centre-forward for Douglas Haig, on loan from Defensa y Justicia.

== Career ==
Villagra joined Defensa y Justicia's system in 2015, following a successful trial. He made the jump into first-team football towards the end of 2020 under manager Hernán Crespo, having signed his first professional contract at the start of March. He was initially an unused substitute for four matches in 2020–21, including for a Copa Libertadores group stage defeat to Santos on 21 October. Villagra made his senior debut on 21 November in a Copa de la Liga Profesional defeat to Colón, coming off the bench with fourteen minutes left of a match that also saw his brother, Brian, feature for the opposition. Five more appearances followed.

On 1 February 2021, Villagra was loaned to Primera Nacional with San Martín de San Juan. He debuted in a Copa Argentina round of sixty-four encounter with the club's namesakes from San Miguel de Tucumán on 1 March, before scoring on his league bow during a 4–2 victory over Atlético de Rafaela on 12 March.

In February 2022, Villagra joined Guillermo Brown on loan until the end of 2022. However, the loan was terminated on 12 June 2022, and Villagra was instead loaned out to Douglas Haig for the rest of the year.

== Personal life ==
Villagra has four footballing brothers: Brian Fernández, Leandro Fernández, Nicolás Fernández and Tomás Villagra. Unlike their siblings, Juan Cruz and Tomás chose to take their mother's surname.

== Career statistics ==
As of 13 March 2021.

Appearances and goals by club, season and competition
Club	Season	League			Cup		League Cup		Continental		Other		Total	
Club	Season	Division	Apps	Goals	Apps	Goals	Apps	Goals	Apps	Goals	Apps	Goals	Apps	Goals
Defensa y Justicia	2020–21 (Note: Soccerway counts Copa de la Liga Profesional appearances as league appearances.)	Primera División	5	0	0	0	0	0	1 (Note: Appearance(s) in the Copa Sudamericana)	0	0	0	6	0
San Martín (loan)	2021	Primera Nacional	1	1	1	0	—		—		0	0	2	1
Career total			6	1	1	0	0	0	1	0	0	0	8	1

== Honours ==
Defensa y Justicia

- Copa Sudamericana: 2020
