= Gregorio Rodríguez (footballer) =

Argentine footballer

Personal information
- Full name: Gregorio Rodríguez
- Date of birth: 17 January 2000 (age 26)
- Place of birth: Córdoba, Argentina
- Height: 1.80 m (5 ft 11 in)
- Position: Winger

Team information
- Current team: Levadiakos (on loan from Melgar)
- Number: 27

Youth career
- Instituto

Senior career*
Years	Team	Apps	(Gls)
2021–2025	Instituto	79	(7)
2025–	Melgar	27	(3)
2026	→ San Lorenzo (loan)	14	(2)
2026–	→ Levadiakos (loan)	1	(0)
- * Club domestic league appearances and goals as of 21:00, 6 September 2026 (UTC)

Gregorio Rodríguez (born 17 January 2000) is an Argentine professional footballer who plays as a winger for Super League Greece club Levadiakos, on loan from Melgar.

== Career ==
=== Instituto ===
Rodríguez came through the youth setup at Instituto and made his debut for the first team on 4 July 2021 in a 1–1 draw against San Martín SJ. He signed his first professional contract on 4 February 2022 and on 8 August scored his first goal for the club in a 1–1 draw against Güemes. He was part of the side that was promoted to the Liga Profesional in 2022 and by the end of his first season in the top flight, he began to establish himself in the first team.

=== Melgar ===
On 21 January 2025, he moved abroad to join Peruvian Liga 1 side Melgar for $800,000. He featured in continental competition for Melgar, scoring in a 3–3 draw in the Copa Sudamericana against Vasco da Gama.

==== Loan to San Lorenzo ====
On 19 January 2026, he returned to Argentina on loan to San Lorenzo. On 31 January, he made his debut against Central Córdoba SdE, scoring the winner in the 55th minute of a 1–0 victory.

== Career statistics ==
As of 24 February 2026

Appearances and goals by club, season and competition
Club	Season	League			Cup (Note: Includes Copa Argentina)		Continental		Other		Total	
Club	Season	Division	Goals	Apps	Apps	Goals	Apps	Goals	Apps	Goals	Apps	Goals
Instituto	2021	Primera Nacional	3	0	—		—		—		3	0
Instituto	2022	Primera Nacional	31	2	—		—		—		31	2
Instituto	2023	Liga Profesional	18	1	1	0	—		—		19	1
Instituto	2024	Liga Profesional	27	4	—		—		—		27	4
Instituto	Total		79	7	1	0	0	0	0	0	80	7
FBC Melgar	2025	Liga 1	27	3	—		10 (Note: Four appearances in Copa Libertadores, six appearances and one goal in Copa Sudamericana)	1	—		37	4
San Lorenzo (loan)	2026	Liga Profesional	4	1	—		—		—		4	1
Career total			110	11	1	0	10	1	0	0	121	12
