= Francisco González Metilli =

Argentine footballer

Personal information
- Date of birth: 29 March 1997 (age 29)
- Place of birth: Tandil, Argentina
- Height: 1.78 m (5 ft 10 in)
- Position: Attacking midfielder

Team information
- Current team: Belgrano
- Number: 11

Youth career
- Santamarina

Senior career*
Years	Team	Apps	(Gls)
2016–2019	Santamarina	59	(4)
2019–2023	Argentinos Juniors	39	(5)
2019–2021	→ Estudiantes BA (loan)	30	(8)
2021	→ Tigre (loan)	28	(1)
2022	→ Central Córdoba SdE (loan)	40	(7)
2024–	Belgrano	78	(4)
- * Club domestic league appearances and goals as of 17:45, 9 July 2026 (UTC)

Francisco González Metilli (born 29 March 1997) is an Argentine professional footballer who plays as an attacking midfielder for Belgrano.

== Career ==
González Metilli's career began with Santamarina. He made his professional debut on 14 March 2016 during a defeat to Nueva Chicago, being substituted on for Gonzalo Ludueña after sixty-three minutes. His first start arrived in the following May against Independiente Rivadavia, though it lasted just nineteen minutes as he was sent off in the first half following two yellow cards in as many minutes. October 2017 saw González Metilli score his first goal against Atlético de Rafaela prior to netting a brace over Instituto twelve months later. In January 2019, Argentinos Juniors of the Primera División signed González Metilli.

He made his Primera División and Argentinos debut on 28 January 2019, featuring for fifty minutes of a 2–0 loss to Colón. In July 2019, González Metilli was loaned to Primera B Nacional's Estudiantes until June 2020. He scored on his debut against Mitre on 16 August, which preceded a further six goals across twenty-four total appearances for the club. In July 2020, the loan was extended until 31 December.

== Career statistics ==
As of 27 August 2020.

Club statistics
Club	Season	League			Cup		League Cup		Continental		Other		Total	
Club	Season	Division	Apps	Goals	Apps	Goals	Apps	Goals	Apps	Goals	Apps	Goals	Apps	Goals
Santamarina	2016	Primera B Nacional	6	0	0	0	—		—		0	0	6	0
Santamarina	2016–17	Primera B Nacional	20	0	1	0	—		—		0	0	21	0
Santamarina	2017–18	Primera B Nacional	21	1	0	0	—		—		0	0	21	1
Santamarina	2018–19	Primera B Nacional	12	3	0	0	—		—		0	0	12	3
Santamarina	Total		59	4	1	0	—		—		0	0	60	4
Argentinos Juniors	2018–19	Primera División	1	0	1	0	0	0	0	0	0	0	2	0
Argentinos Juniors	2019–20	Primera División	0	0	0	0	0	0	0	0	0	0	0	0
Argentinos Juniors	2020–21	Primera División	0	0	0	0	0	0	—		0	0	0	0
Argentinos Juniors	Total		1	0	1	0	0	0	0	0	0	0	2	0
Estudiantes (loan)	2019–20	Primera B Nacional	20	7	4	0	—		—		0	0	24	7
Estudiantes (loan)	2020–21	Primera B Nacional	0	0	0	0	—		—		0	0	0	0
Estudiantes (loan)	Total		20	7	4	0	—		—		0	0	24	7
Career total			80	11	6	0	0	0	0	0	0	0	86	11

== Honours ==
Belgrano

- Primera División: 2026 Apertura
