= Adrián Spörle =

Argentine footballer

Personal information
- Full name: Adrián Marcelo Spörle
- Date of birth: 13 July 1995 (age 31)
- Place of birth: Centenario, Argentina
- Height: 1.86 m (6 ft 1 in)
- Positions: Left-back; left midfielder

Team information
- Current team: Belgrano
- Number: 3

Youth career
- 2008–2014: Banfield

Senior career*
Years	Team	Apps	(Gls)
2014–2019	Banfield	55	(1)
2019–2023	Dundee United	41	(5)
2023–2024	Arsenal Sarandi	38	(1)
2024–2025	Independiente	33	(2)
2025–	Belgrano	23	(0)
- * Club domestic league appearances and goals as of 17:41, 9 July 2026 (UTC)

Adrián Marcelo Spörle (born 13 July 1995) is an Argentine professional footballer who plays as a left-back or left midfielder for Belgrano.

== Career ==
=== Banfield ===
Spörle, after joining their ranks in 2008, began his senior career with Banfield in 2014, making his debut on 7 June in the club's final match of their 2013–14 Primera B Nacional-winning campaign against Unión Santa Fe. He made his continental debut in August 2016 against San Lorenzo in the Copa Sudamericana, prior to scoring his first goal on 19 November in the Primera División versus Arsenal de Sarandí.

=== Dundee United ===
On 13 June 2019, after one goal in sixty-nine games for Banfield, Spörle left for Scottish football after agreeing a move to Championship side Dundee United; penning a three-year contract. His unofficial bow came in a Brechin City friendly on 5 July.

Spörle made his competitive debut for Dundee United on 12 July, playing forty-five minutes of a Scottish League Cup group stage loss to Heart of Midlothian. On his second appearance in the same competition, Spörle netted his opening goal in a 3–0 victory over Cowdenbeath on 19 July. He didn't feature in any of the club's first four Championship fixtures, instead he played for the reserves in the SPFL Reserve League. Spörle's first league appearance belatedly arrived on 21 September, as he came off the bench to replace Louis Appéré in a 2–1 home win over Arbroath. Spörle struggled to learn English in his early months. In January 2020, Spörle scored his first league goal during a win away to Partick Thistle and netted on his Scottish Cup debut away to Hibernian.

After the club won promotion as champions at the end of 2019–20, Spörle scored his first Scottish top-flight goal on 19 September in a home win over St Mirren. That was followed by further goals in 2020–21 against Livingston, Kilmarnock and Aberdeen as he began playing as a left midfielder.

=== Independiente ===
On 1 January 2024, Spörle joined Club Atlético Independiente.

== Personal life ==
Spörle holds dual nationality through his German grandfather.

== Career statistics ==
As of 14 August 2021

Club statistics
Club	Season	League			Cup		League Cup		Continental		Other		Total	
Club	Season	Division	Apps	Goals	Apps	Goals	Apps	Goals	Apps	Goals	Apps	Goals	Apps	Goals
Banfield	2013–14	Primera B Nacional	1	0	0	0	—		—		0	0	1	0
Banfield	2014	Primera División	0	0	0	0	—		—		0	0	0	0
Banfield	2015	Primera División	0	0	0	0	—		—		0	0	0	0
Banfield	2016	Primera División	6	0	1	0	—		—		0	0	7	0
Banfield	2016–17	Primera División	18	1	2	0	—		2 (Note: Appearance(s) in the Copa Sudamericana)	0	0	0	22	1
Banfield	2017–18	Primera División	20	0	2	0	—		4 (Note: Appearance(s) in the Copa Libertadores)	0	0	0	26	0
Banfield	2018–19	Primera División	10	0	1	0	0	0	2	0	0	0	13	0
Banfield	Total		55	1	6	0	0	0	8	0	0	0	69	1
Dundee United	2019–20	Scottish Championship	11	1	1	1	3	1	—		1 (Note: Appearance(s) in the Scottish Challenge Cup)	0	16	3
Dundee United	2020–21	Scottish Premiership	24	4	3	0	1	0	—		—		28	4
Dundee United	2021–22	Scottish Premiership	1	0	0	0	1	0	—		—		2	0
Dundee United	Total		36	5	4	1	5	1	0	0	1	0	46	7
Career total			91	6	10	1	5	1	8	0	1	0	115	8

== Honours ==
Banfield

- Primera B Nacional: 2013–14

Dundee United

- Championship: 2019–20

Belgrano

- Primera División: 2026 Apertura
