= Alcides Benítez =

Paraguayan footballer

Personal information
- Full name: Alcides Javier Benítez Cabrera
- Date of birth: 28 June 2002 (age 24)
- Place of birth: Asunción, Paraguay
- Height: 1.68 m (5 ft 6 in)
- Position: Right-back

Team information
- Current team: Belgrano
- Number: 26

Senior career*
Years	Team	Apps	(Gls)
2022–2026	Guaraní	72	(2)
2023	→ 2 de Mayo (loan)	20	(1)
2026–	Belgrano	16	(0)
- * Club domestic league appearances and goals as of 17:55, 9 July 2026 (UTC)

Alcides Javier Benítez Cabrera (born 28 June 2002) is a Paraguayan professional footballer who plays as a right-back for Belgrano in the Argentine Liga Profesional.

== Club career ==
Born in Asunción, Benítez came through the youth ranks at Guaraní, before earning his senior first-team debut in the Paraguayan Primera División in October 2022. In January 2023, he joined 2 de Mayo on loan in the Paraguayan División Intermedia, where he scored his first senior goal in April 2023. He returned to Guaraní at the end of 2023, rejoining the club on 1 January 2024. Back at Guaraní, Benítez established himself as a regular starter, featuring in the Copa Sudamericana during the 2024 and 2025 seasons. He reached the milestone of 50 career appearances in April 2025. In January 2026, Benítez completed a transfer to Argentine club Belgrano on a contract until 2028. He helped Belgrano win the 2026 Copa Argentina, their first ever honour in their history.

== International career ==
Benítez was called up to the preliminary Paraguay national team for the 2026 FIFA World Cup.

== Honours ==
Belgrano

- Primera División: 2026 Apertura
