= Nicolás Fernández (footballer, born 1996) =

Argentine footballer

Personal information
- Full name: Nicolás Emanuel Fernández
- Date of birth: 8 February 1996 (age 30)
- Place of birth: Santa Fe, Argentina
- Height: 1.65 m (5 ft 5 in)
- Position: Forward

Team information
- Current team: Belgrano
- Number: 22

Youth career
- Defensa y Justicia

Senior career*
| Years | Team | Apps | (Gls) |
| 2014–2020 | Defensa y Justicia | 59 | (17) |
| 2020–2022 | San Lorenzo | 52 | (7) |
| 2022–2024 | Defensa y Justicia | 77 | (23) |
| 2024– | Belgrano | 67 | (19) |
- * Club domestic league appearances and goals as of 17:50, 9 July 2026 (UTC)

Nicolás Emanuel "Uvita" Fernández (born 8 February 1996), is an Argentine professional footballer who plays as a forward for Belgrano.

== Personal life ==
Fernández has four footballing brothers: Brian Fernández, Leandro Fernández, Juan Cruz Villagra and Tomás Villagra; the latter two took their mother's surname.

== Honours ==
Defensa y Justicia

- Copa Argentina runner-up: 2023

Belgrano

- Primera División: 2026 Apertura

Individual

- Copa Sudamericana Team of the Tournament: 2023
