= Gerardo Acuña =

Argentine footballer and manager

Personal information
- Full name: Gerardo Rodolfo Acuña
- Date of birth: 18 December 1979 (age 46)
- Place of birth: Morteros, Argentina
- Position: Forward

Team information
- Current team: Estudiantes de Río Cuarto (interim)

Youth career
- Tiro Federal de Morteros
- 9 de Julio de Morteros
- Unión Santa Fe
- Atlético Rafaela

Senior career*
Years	Team	Apps	(Gls)
1995–1996	9 de Julio de Morteros		
2000–2002	Atlético Rafaela	15	(0)
2002–2004	9 de Julio de Morteros		
2004–2005	Ateneo Vecinos		
2006–2007	9 de Julio de Morteros		
2007	Sportivo Belgrano	10	(4)
2008	Tiro Federal de Morteros	12	(2)
2008–2009	9 de Julio de Río Tercero	22	(11)
2009–2012	Ateneo Vecinos		

Managerial career
- 2012: Ateneo Vecinos (player-manager)
- 2013–2019: Tiro Federal de Morteros
- 2020: 9 de Julio de Morteros
- 2021: Estudiantes de Río Cuarto
- 2021–2023: Sarmiento de Leones
- 2024–2026: 9 de Julio de Morteros
- 2026–: Estudiantes de Río Cuarto (reserves)
- 2026: Estudiantes de Río Cuarto (interim)
- 2026–: Estudiantes de Río Cuarto (interim)
- * Club domestic league appearances and goals

Gerardo Rodolfo Acuña (born 18 December 1979) is an Argentine football manager and former player who played as a forward. He is the current interim manager of Estudiantes de Río Cuarto.

== Playing career ==
Born in Morteros, Córdoba Province, Acuña played for hometown sides Tiro Federal de Morteros and 9 de Julio de Morteros before making his first team debut at the age of 15. After a failed trial at Boca Juniors, he subsequently represented Unión de Santa Fe and Atlético Rafaela, where he made his professional debut in Primera B Nacional in 2000.

After leaving Rafaela in 2002, Acuña returned to 9 de Julio. He would resume his playing career in the lower leagues, representing Ateneo Vecinos de General Cabrera (two stints), 9 de Julio again, Sportivo Belgrano, Tiro Federal de Morteros and 9 de Julio de Río Tercero. In 2011, aged 31, he suffered a serious knee injury while at Ateneo which led him to management.

== Managerial career ==
In January 2012, while still recovering from his injury, Acuña was confirmed as player-manager of his last club Ateneo Vecinos. On 26 June of the following year, he was announced in charge of another club he represented as a player, Tiro Federal de Morteros.

On 11 December 2019, after being knocked out in the inaugural Torneo Regional Federal Amateur and narrowly avoiding relegation in the Liga Regional de San Francisco, Acuña left Tiro Federal. On 6 March 2020, he was named manager of 9 de Julio de Morteros.

On 6 February 2021, Acuña replaced Marcelo Vázquez at the helm of Estudiantes de Río Cuarto in the second division. On 6 September, after a poor run of form, he left by mutual consent.

On 29 October 2021, Acuña was appointed Sarmiento de Leones manager. He left the club in December 2023, and returned to 9 de Morteros shortly after.

On 26 January 2026, Acuña resigned from 9 de Julio, after two members from his technical staff died. He subsequently returned to Estudiantes as a manager of their reserve team.

On 15 March 2026, Acuña was named interim manager of Estudiantes, after Iván Delfino was sacked. Seven days later, despite suffering two losses in as many matches, he was confirmed as manager for the remainder of the Apertura tournament.

On 6 May 2026, Acuña ended his interim spell, after six winless matches.
