= Adrián Sánchez (footballer) =

Argentine footballer

Personal information
- Full name: Adrián Guillermo Sánchez
- Date of birth: 14 May 1999 (age 27)
- Place of birth: Don Torcuato, Argentina
- Height: 1.77 m (5 ft 10 in)
- Position: Midfielder

Team information
- Current team: Belgrano
- Number: 21

Youth career
- Boca Juniors

Senior career*
Years	Team	Apps	(Gls)
2020–2024	Boca Juniors	0	(0)
2020	→ Cerro Largo (loan)	18	(0)
2021	→ Curicó Unido (loan)	26	(4)
2022	→ Everton (loan)	27	(2)
2023	→ Atlético Tucumán (loan)	34	(1)
2024–2026	Atlético Tucumán	70	(2)
2026–	Belgrano	19	(1)
- * Club domestic league appearances and goals as of 17:49, 9 July 2026 (UTC)

Adrián Guillermo Sánchez (born 14 May 1999) is an Argentine footballer playing as a midfielder for Argentine Primera Division club Belgrano.

== Career ==
A product of Boca Juniors, Sánchez was loaned out to Uruguayan club Cerro Largo in 2020 and the Chilean club Curicó Unido and Everton in 2021 and 2022, respectively.

In 2023, he was loaned out to Atlético Tucumán. On 17 November of the same year, the San Miguel de Tucumán club decided to activate the purchase option, paying US$400.000,00 for 65% of the player's economic rights.

In 2026, Sánchez signs for Belgrano. Belgrano will acquire 100% of the player's economic rights.

== Career statistics ==
=== Club ===
As of 14 July 2020.

Club	Season	League			Cup		Continental		Other		Total	
Club	Season	Division	Apps	Goals	Apps	Goals	Apps	Goals	Apps	Goals	Apps	Goals
Boca Juniors	2019–20	Argentine Primera División	0	0	0	0	0	0	0	0	0	0
Cerro Largo (loan)	2020	Uruguayan Primera División	2	0	0	0	1 (Note: Appearances in the Copa Libertadores)	0	0	0	3	0
Career total			2	0	0	0	1	0	0	0	3	0

== Honours ==
Belgrano

- Primera División: 2026 Apertura
