= Ricardo Zielinski =

Argentine footballer and manager

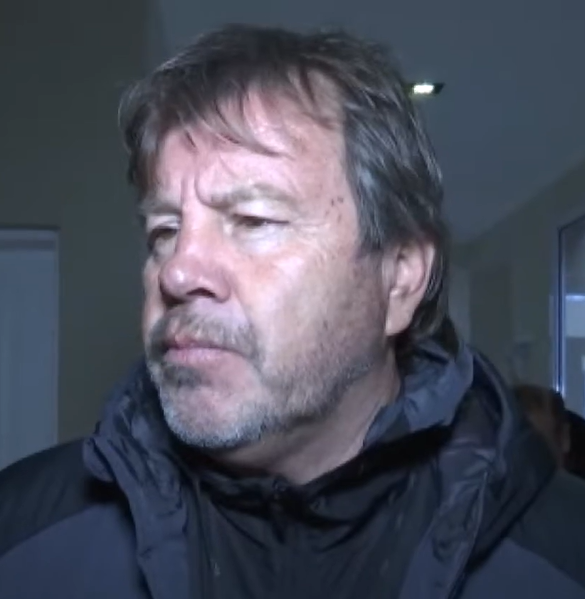
- Zielinski in 2019

Personal information
- Full name: Ricardo Alberto Zielinski
- Date of birth: 14 October 1959 (age 67)
- Place of birth: Buenos Aires, Argentina
- Height: 1.80 m (5 ft 11 in)
- Position: Midfielder

Team information
- Current team: Belgrano (manager)

Senior career*
Years	Team	Apps	(Gls)
1979–1980	San Telmo		
1981–1982	Argentino de Quilmes	67	(2)
1983–1985	Chacarita Juniors	91	(2)
1986–1989	Deportivo Mandiyú		
1989–1990	Deportivo Laferrere	14	(0)
1991–1992	Ituzaingó	9	(0)

Managerial career
- 1994–1995: Ituzaingó
- 1997–1998: Atlanta
- 1998–1999: San Telmo
- 1999–2000: Deportivo Morón
- 2000–2001: Temperley
- 2001: San Martín (SJ)
- 2002–2003: Defensa y Justicia
- 2004: All Boys
- 2004: Juventud Antoniana
- 2005: El Porvenir
- 2006–2007: Temperley
- 2007–2008: Ben Hur
- 2008–2009: Chacarita Jrs
- 2010: Patronato
- 2011–2016: Belgrano
- 2016: Racing Club
- 2017–2021: Atlético Tucumán
- 2021–2022: Estudiantes de La Plata
- 2023: Nacional
- 2023: Independiente
- 2023–2024: Lanús
- 2025–: Belgrano
- * Club domestic league appearances and goals

Ricardo Alberto Zielinski (born 14 October 1959) is an Argentine professional football manager and former player who played as a midfielder. He is the current manager of Argentine Primera División club Belgrano.

== Career ==
"El Ruso" started his playing career at San Telmo in 1979. Zielinski also played for Argentino de Quilmes, Chacarita Juniors, Deportivo Mandiyú, Deportivo Laferrere and Ituzaingó.

He started his managerial career in 1994 as coach of his former club, Ituzaingó. From 15 December 2010 to 30 July 2016, Zielinski was the manager of Belgrano. In his first season, he got Belgrano promoted to the Primera Division through the play-offs, defeating River Plate 3–1 on aggregate to relegate them for the first time in their history. On 29 August 2016, Zielinski signed with Racing Club.

After leaving Racing, Zielinski was in charge of Atlético Tucumán and Estudiantes de La Plata. On 17 November 2022, he was appointed as manager of Uruguayan side Nacional, but left in a mutual agreement the following 19 March.

== Personal life ==
Born in Argentina, Zielinski is of Polish descent.

== Honours ==
=== Manager ===
Belgrano

- Argentine Primera División: 2026 Apertura
