= Damián Ayude =

Argentine football manager

Personal information
- Date of birth: 14 April 1982 (age 44)
- Place of birth: Buenos Aires, Argentina

Team information
- Current team: Barracas Central (manager)

Managerial career
- Years: Team
- 2003–2004: Nueva Chicago (youth)
- 2005–2006: Chacarita Juniors (youth)
- 2007–2015: Argentinos Juniors (youth)
- 2016: Deportivo Anzoátegui (assistant)
- 2017: Sportivo Estudiantes (assistant)
- 2017–2018: Unión San Felipe
- 2018: Barracas Central (assistant)
- 2019–2021: Argentina U20 (assistant)
- 2019–2021: Argentina U23 (assistant)
- 2022: Venezuela U17
- 2023: León (assistant)
- 2024: Cruzeiro (assistant)
- 2024–2025: San Lorenzo (reserves)
- 2025–2026: San Lorenzo
- 2026–: Barracas Central

Damián Ayude (born 14 April 1982) is an Argentine football manager, currently in charge of Barracas Central.

== Career ==
Born in Buenos Aires, Ayude worked in the youth sides of Nueva Chicago, Chacarita Juniors and Argentinos Juniors before joining Nicolás Larcamón's staff at Venezuelan side Deportivo Anzoátegui in 2016, as his assistant. He left the latter in December, and subsequently became Omar Asad's assistant at Sportivo Estudiantes back in his home country.

On 19 September 2017, Ayude was announced as manager of Primera B de Chile side Unión San Felipe. Despite avoiding relegation with the side, he was sacked on 27 February 2018, after a poor start of the new season.

In 2019, Ayude became a part of Fernando Batista's staff at the Argentina national under-20 and under-23 teams. On 9 July 2022, he moved to Venezuela with Batista, after being named manager of the Venezuela national under-17 team.

In 2023, Ayude reunited with Larcamón after becoming his assistant at León. He followed Larcamón to Cruzeiro under the same role in December of that year, but left in April 2024 when Larcamón was sacked.

On 29 April 2024, Ayude was appointed manager of San Lorenzo's reserve team. On 4 June of the following year, he was named in charge of the first team, replacing Miguel Ángel Russo.

On 17 March 2026, Ayude was sacked from San Lorenzo after just one win in his last seven matches in charge. On 20 June, he replaced Rubén Darío Insúa at the helm of fellow top tier side Barracas Central.

== Managerial statistics ==
As of 25 October 2026

Managerial record by team and tenure
Team	Nat	From	To	Record							
Team	Nat	From	To	G	W	D	L	GF	GA	GD	Win %
Unión San Felipe	(Chile)	19 September 2017	26 February 2018	13	3	7	3	14	15	−1	23.08
San Lorenzo	(Argentina)	4 June 2025	17 March 2026	29	9	11	9	24	25	−1	31.03
Barracas Central	(Argentina)	22 June 2026	present	15	6	4	5	14	14	+0	40.00
Total				57	18	22	17	52	54	−2	31.58
