= Lucas Sanseviero =

Uruguayan footballer (born 2000)

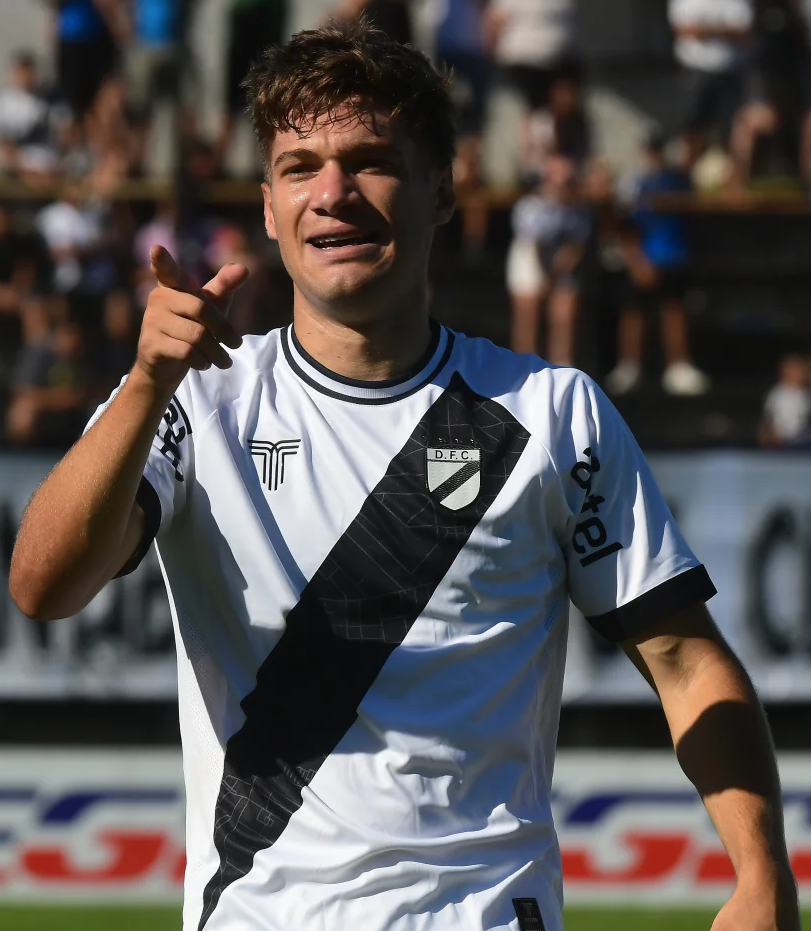
- Sanseviero playing for Danubio in 2025

Personal information
- Full name: Lucas Martín Sanseviero Pérez
- Date of birth: 5 August 2000 (age 26)
- Place of birth: San Ramón, Uruguay
- Height: 1.80 m (5 ft 11 in)
- Position: Winger

Team information
- Current team: Instituto (on loan from Valladolid)
- Number: 19

Youth career
- 2016: Peñarol de San Ramón
- 2017–2021: Nacional

Senior career*
Years	Team	Apps	(Gls)
2022	Nacional	0	(0)
2022	→ Central Español (loan)	23	(1)
2023	Uruguay Montevideo	30	(7)
2024–2025	Danubio	61	(6)
2026–	Valladolid	11	(1)
2026–	→ Instituto (loan)	0	(0)
- * Club domestic league appearances and goals as of 9 June 2026

Lucas Martín Sanseviero Pérez (born 5 August 2000) is a Uruguayan professional footballer who plays as a winger for Argentine club Instituto, on loan from Spanish club Real Valladolid.

== Career ==
=== Early career ===
Born in San Ramón, Sanseviero began his career with hometown side Peñarol de San Ramón before joining the youth categories of Nacional in 2017. He only played a few friendlies with the first team squad, before being loaned out to Segunda División side Central Español on 15 March 2022.

On 5 February 2023, Uruguay Montevideo announced the signing of Sanseviero for the second division season. Regularly used, he scored seven goals and provided five assists in 30 matches as the club missed out promotion in the play-offs.

=== Danubio ===
On 29 February 2024, Sanseviero was presented at Primera División side Danubio. He made his debut in the category on 10 March, in a 2–1 away win over Liverpool Montevideo, and scored his first goal on 15 September, in a 3–0 home success over River Plate Montevideo.

Sanseviero established himself as a regular starter in the 2025 season, where he provided ten assists and scored five times in 36 matches overall.

=== Valladolid ===
On 23 January 2026, Sanseviero moved abroad for the first time in his career, signing a six-month contract with Spanish Segunda División side Real Valladolid. On 9 June, he renewed his link until 2029.

==== Loan to Instituto ====
On 1 August 2026, Sanseviero was loaned to Argentine side Instituto Atlético Central Córdoba until December 2027.
