= Río Cuarto =

Rio Cuarto may refer to:

- Río Cuarto (canton), Heredia Province, Costa Rica
- Río Cuarto, Córdoba
- Cuarto River
- Rio Cuarto craters
- Río Cuarto Department
