= Luciano Guiñazú =

Argentine footballer

Luciano Guiñazu (born 1 November 1971) is an Argentine former professional footballer who played as a midfielder for clubs of Argentina, Chile, Mexico and El Salvador.

== Career ==
- Ferro Carril Oeste 1991–1992
- Deportes Concepción 1993–1995
- Ituzaingó 1996–1997
- Estudiantes 1997–1999
- Aguascalientes 1999–2001
- Correcaminos 2001
- FAS 2002–2003
- Lobos de Tlaxcala 2003–2005

== Honours ==
Deportes Concepción

- Primera B de Chile: 1994
