= Favio Orsi =

Argentine footballer and manager

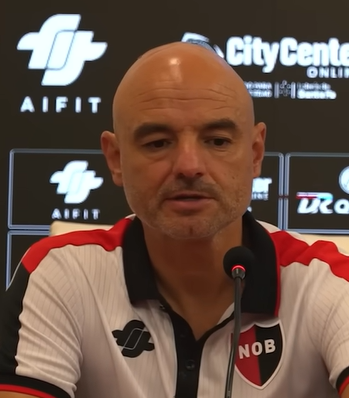
- Orsi in 2026

Personal information
- Full name: Favio Leandro Orsi
- Date of birth: 18 February 1974 (age 52)
- Place of birth: Pilar, Argentina
- Position: Midfielder

Youth career
- River Plate
- Platense

Senior career*
Years	Team	Apps	(Gls)
- Platense
1996–1997	Estudiantes BA		
1997	FC Jazz	9	(0)
2010	Pilar FC		

Managerial career
- 2011–2012: Pilar FC
- 2013–2014: Fénix
- 2014–2015: Deportivo Español
- 2015–2018: Flandria
- 2018–2019: Almagro
- 2019–2021: San Martín de Tucumán
- 2021: Ferro Carril Oeste
- 2022: Godoy Cruz
- 2023–2024: Atlético Tucumán
- 2024–2025: Platense
- 2026: Newell's Old Boys
- * Club domestic league appearances and goals

Favio Leandro Orsi (born 18 February 1974) is an Argentine football manager and former player who played mainly as a midfielder.

== Career ==
Born in Pilar, Buenos Aires, Orsi played youth football for River Plate and Platense, also featuring with the first team of the latter. He also represented Estudiantes de Buenos Aires in his home country before moving to Finland in 1997 with FC Jazz, where he featured in nine Veikkausliiga matches.

Orsi retired in 2000, after struggling for two years with a knee injury while playing for an Italian club, but returned to action for a brief period in 2010 with Pilar FC. In the following year, he moved to a managerial role, taking over the latter side.

In 2012, Orsi moved to Fénix to join the coaching staff of Oscar Santángelo, and met Sergio Gómez (who was also a part of the staff). In April 2013, after Santángelo resigned, both Orsi and Gómez were named managers.

In June 2014, Orsi and Gómez were appointed in charge of Deportivo Español. The duo moved to Flandria in August 2015, and led the side to a first-ever promotion to the Primera B Nacional in their first season in charge, after winning the Primera B Metropolitana.

On 2 May 2018, after Flandria's relegation, both Orsi and Gómez left the side, and the duo took over Almagro on 5 June. They resigned the following 24 February, and both were named in charge of San Martín de Tucumán on 8 May 2019.

Dismissed by San Martín on 6 April 2021, Orsi and Gómez were named in charge of Ferro Carril Oeste on 20 July. Both resigned from the latter side on 20 December.

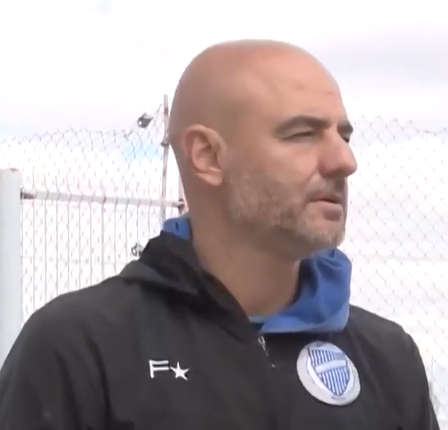
Orsi as manager of Godoy Cruz in 2022

On 10 April 2022, Orsi and Gómez were appointed managers of Primera División side Godoy Cruz, in the place of Diego Flores. The duo left on a mutual agreement on 28 October.

On 3 July 2023, Orsi and Gómez were named in charge of Atlético Tucumán also in the top tier. Both resigned on 19 February 2024, and took over fellow league team Platense ten days later.

Despite leading Platense to the 2025 Apertura title, Orsi and Gómez resigned on 11 June 2025. On 19 December, the duo were named managers of Newell's Old Boys for the upcoming season, but both were sacked on 21 February 2026.

== Honours ==
=== Manager ===
Flandria

- Primera B Metropolitana: 2016

Platense

- Argentine Primera División: 2025 Apertura
