= El Gigante de Alberdi =

Football stadium in Córdoba, Argentina

Coordinates: 31°24′13″S 64°12′23″W

Julio César Villagra Stadium
- Estadio Julio César Villagra
- El Gigante de Alberdi
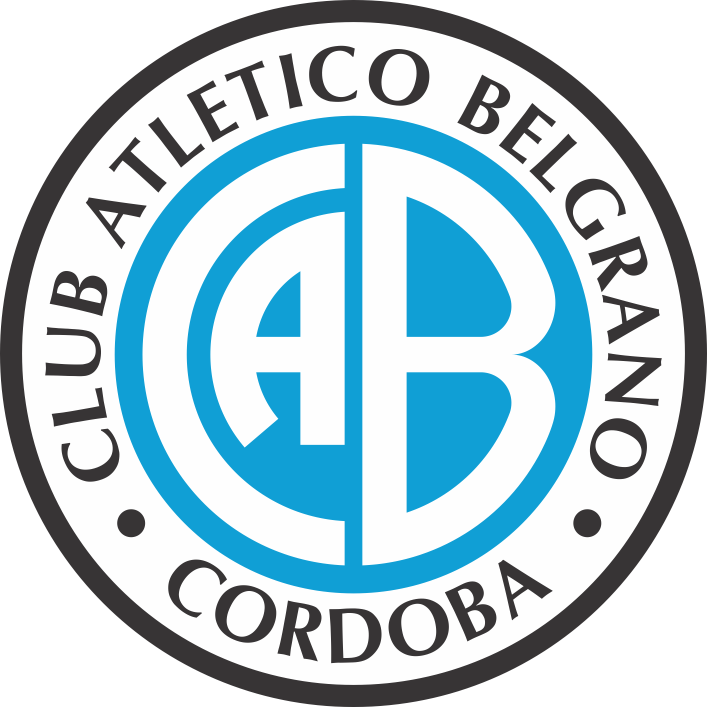

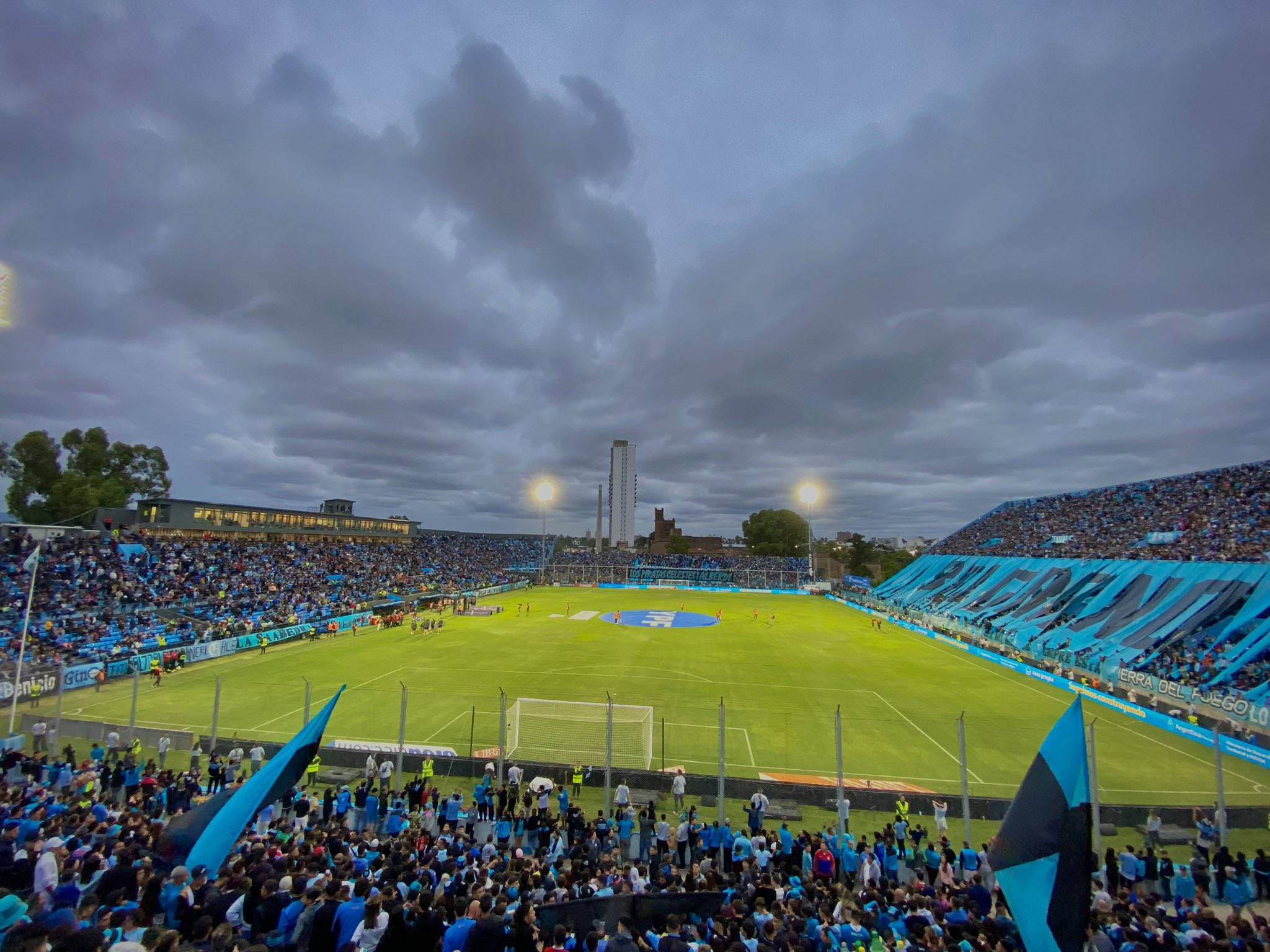
- View of the stadium in 2023
- Interactive map of Julio César Villagra Stadium
- Address: Arturo Orgaz 510; Córdoba; Argentina
- Owner: C.A. Belgrano
- Capacity: 38,000
- Surface: Grass
- Field size: 108 x 68 m

Construction
- Opened: 17 March 1929; 97 years ago
- Renovated: 1997
- Expanded: 2016
- Cost: mn$85.000

Tenant
- Belgrano (1929–present)

Website
- belgranocordoba.com/estadio

Julio César Villagra Stadium, nicknamed El Gigante de Alberdi, is a football stadium located in Barrio Alberdi in Córdoba, Argentina. Inaugurated on 17 March 1929, it is the home ground of Club Atlético Belgrano and has a capacity of 38,000 spectators.

The stadium was named after Julio César Villagra (1961–1993), one of the greatest players for the club, who played for Belgrano from 1982 to 1993, when he committed suicide.

== History ==
The idea to build a stadium came in 1927 led by Belgrano member Carlos Courel, who then became club vice president. Belgrano asked the mayor of Córdoba, Emilio Olmos, for financial support to achieve that aim. Most of the work was financed by the Municipality, which lent the club mn$60,000. The total cost was about mn$85,000. The Belgrano executives committed to repay the loan in bimonthly payments of $2,000 each.

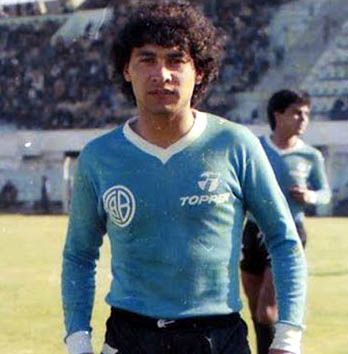
The stadium is named after Julio César Villagra, one of the greatest idols of Belgrano

Alfredo García Voglio was behind the project, executed by Patiño and Fontaine Silva company. Work began in July 1928 and the stadium (capacity of 10,000 spectators) was inaugurated less than one year later, on 17 March 1929. Until then, the main stadium in Córdoba was inaugurated in 1917, the first pitch in the city which had a capacity for 6.000. The stadium hosted the main friendly matches in Córdoba until it was closed in 1939.

In the first match at the stadium, Belgrano played a friendly match v Estudiantes de La Plata, which defeated them 6–1. That same year, Belgrano celebrated their first title in their new stadium when the club won the Liga Cordobesa after beating Nacional 2–1. The lighting system was inaugurated in December 1945 in a match v Newell's Old Boys.

In May 1997, the stadium was reopened after refurbishment, hosting a match where Belgrano defeated Argentina U20 2–1. That match was a friendly that helped the national team prepare for the 1997 FIFA World Youth Championship.

Since then, El Gigante de Alberdi was not remodeled until 2017 when its capacity was expanded to 30,000 spectators. In 2015, Belgrano president Armando Pérez presented the remodeling project for the stadium, which was to be financed by both the club and its supporters. Works included a complete overhaul of the Hualfin stand, which was renamed to honour former Belgrano player and manager Tomas Cuellar, and a general modernization of the stadium. The works were completed in 2017 under the presidency of Jorge Francesqui and the stadium was reinaugurated in a match against San Martín de San Juan, in which Belgrano won 1-0.

In 2024, Belgrano drew an average home attendance of 36,322.
