= Luis Fabián Artime =

Argentine footballer

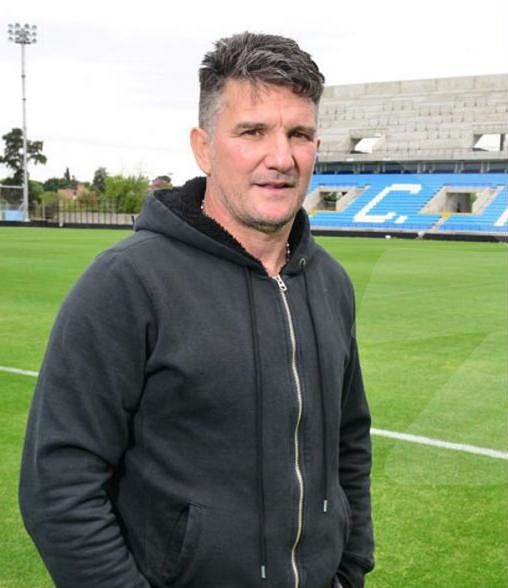
- Artime in 2020

Personal information
- Full name: Luis Fabián Artime
- Date of birth: December 15, 1965 (age 60)
- Place of birth: Ramos Mejía, Argentina
- Position: Forward

Youth career
- Ferro Carril Oeste

Senior career*
Years	Team	Apps	(Gls)
1985–1989	Ferro Carril Oeste	70	(12)
1990–1991	Independiente	25	(6)
1992–1993	Belgrano de Córdoba	44	(17)
1993–1994	San Lorenzo	17	(1)
1994–1999	Belgrano de Córdoba	188	(52)
1999	Tigre	15	(4)
2000–2001	Belgrano de Córdoba	47	(12)
2001	Gimnasia La Plata	4	(0)
2002	FBC Melgar	42	(24)
2003–2005	Belgrano de Córdoba	51	(11)
- * Club domestic league appearances and goals

Luis Fabián Artime (born December 15, 1965) is an Argentine former professional footballer who played as a forward.

Artime was born in Ramos Mejía, Greater Buenos Aires. He spent most of his career playing for Belgrano de Córdoba where he is regarded as a club legend and is the all-time leading goalscorer with 91 goals in his career. His father was Luis Artime, a famous goalscorer in the 1960s.

Artime was a prolific goalscorer and while playing in Peru, he was the top goalscorer in 2002.

Artime was elected as president of Belgrano in February 2021. Under his administration, Belgrano won the Primera Nacional title after defeating Brown de Adrogué by 3–2 in the 2022 season and therefore returned to the Argentine Primera División.
