= Gustavo Benítez (footballer, born 1986) =

Argentine professional footballer

Personal information
- Full name: Gustavo Oscar Benítez
- Date of birth: 7 March 1986 (age 40)
- Place of birth: Pergamino, Argentina
- Height: 1.97 m (6 ft 6 in)
- Position: Centre-back

Team information
- Current team: Deportivo Riestra (manager)

Senior career*
Years	Team	Apps	(Gls)
2002–2003	Douglas Haig		
2004	Sportivo Las Heras	0	(0)
2004–2005	Douglas Haig		
2006	Colegiales de Concordia		
2006–2007	Douglas Haig		
2007	Sarmiento		
2008–2009	Juventud Pergamino	27	(0)
2009–2014	Sarmiento		
2013–2014	→ Almirante Brown (loan)	8	(0)
2014–2015	Estudiantes BA	41	(2)
2016–2024	Deportivo Riestra	159	(5)

Managerial career
- 2025–2026: Deportivo Riestra
- 2026–: Deportivo Riestra
- * Club domestic league appearances and goals

Gustavo Oscar Benítez (born 7 March 1986) is an Argentine football manager and former player who played as a centre-back. He is the current manager of Deportivo Riestra.

== Career ==
Benítez started his senior career with Douglas Haig at the age of sixteen, appearing in Torneo Argentino A. Benítez had stints in 2004 and 2006 with lower-league duo Sportivo Las Heras and Colegiales, though returned to Douglas Haig either side of playing for them. 2007 saw Sarmiento sign Benítez. He'd leave the Primera B Nacional outfit a year later, signing for Juventud Pergamino in 2008. Twenty-seven appearances followed in the third tier. Benítez rejoined Sarmiento at the conclusion of 2008–09. He scored his first goal for the club in March 2010 versus Tristán Suárez. They won the 2011–12 title.

On 3 July 2013, Benítez was loaned to Almirante Brown of Primera B Nacional. His debut arrived on 13 August against Villa San Carlos, which preceded a further eight appearances. In June 2014, Benítez agreed a move to Estudiantes. He remained for the 2014 and 2015 campaigns, participating in forty-two league fixtures whilst netting goals against Fénix and Tristán Suárez. Deportivo Riestra became his eighth club in January 2016. Four goals in fifty-three encounters occurred in two seasons, with the latter ending with promotion to tier two. They were relegated in 2017–18; a campaign he ended with two red cards.

== Career statistics ==
As of 2 June 2019.

Appearances and goals by club, season and competition
Club	Season	League			Cup		League Cup		Continental		Other		Total	
Club	Season	Division	Apps	Goals	Apps	Goals	Apps	Goals	Apps	Goals	Apps	Goals	Apps	Goals
Sportivo Las Heras	2003–04	Torneo Argentino B	0	0	0	0	—		—		0	0	0	0
Juventud Pergamino	2008–09	Torneo Argentino A	27	0	0	0	—		—		0	0	27	0
Sarmiento	2012–13	Primera B Nacional	1	0	1	0	—		—		0	0	2	0
Sarmiento	2013–14	Primera B Nacional	0	0	0	0	—		—		0	0	0	0
Sarmiento	Total		1	0	1	0	—		—		0	0	2	0
Almirante Brown (loan)	2013–14	Primera B Nacional	8	0	1	0	—		—		0	0	9	0
Estudiantes	2014	Primera B Metropolitana	6	1	1	0	—		—		1 (Note: Appearance(s) in the Primera B Metropolitana play-offs)	0	8	1
Estudiantes	2015	Primera B Metropolitana	35	1	2	1	—		—		0	0	37	2
Estudiantes	Total		41	2	3	1	—		—		1	0	45	3
Deportivo Riestra	2016	Primera B Metropolitana	17	1	0	0	—		—		0	0	17	1
Deportivo Riestra	2016–17	Primera B Metropolitana	30	3	1	0	—		—		5	0	36	3
Deportivo Riestra	2017–18	Primera B Nacional	21	1	1	0	—		—		0	0	22	1
Deportivo Riestra	2018–19	Primera B Metropolitana	34	0	0	0	—		—		0	0	34	0
Deportivo Riestra	Total		102	5	2	0	—		—		5	0	109	5
Career total			179	7	7	1	—		—		6	0	192	8

== Honours ==
Sarmiento

- Primera B Metropolitana: 2011–12
