= Sergio Gómez (footballer, born 1981) =

Argentine footballer and manager

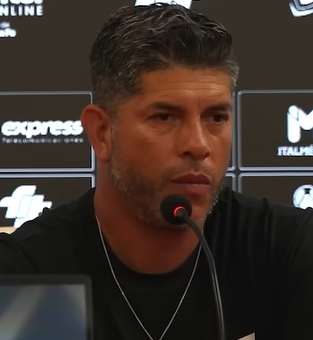
- Gómez in 2026

Personal information
- Full name: Sergio Omar Gómez
- Date of birth: 19 July 1981 (age 45)
- Place of birth: Pilar, Argentina
- Position: Defender

Youth career
- Platense

Senior career*
Years	Team	Apps	(Gls)
2001–2003	Platense	16	(0)
2004	Villa Dálmine	17	(1)
2004–2005	San Miguel	35	(5)
2005–2006	Acassuso	14	(0)
2006–2007	Fénix		
2007–2010	Leandro N. Alem	62	(0)
2010–2011	Fénix		
2011–2012	Dock Sud		
2013–2014	Instituto Deportivo Santiago	10	(0)
2014–2015	Vélez Sarsfield San Ramón	20	(0)

Managerial career
- 2013–2014: Fénix
- 2014–2015: Deportivo Español
- 2015–2018: Flandria
- 2018–2019: Almagro
- 2019–2021: San Martín de Tucumán
- 2021: Ferro Carril Oeste
- 2022: Godoy Cruz
- 2023–2024: Atlético Tucumán
- 2024–2025: Platense
- 2026: Newell's Old Boys
- * Club domestic league appearances and goals

Sergio Omar Gómez (born 19 July 1981) is an Argentine football manager and former player who played mainly as a midfielder.

== Playing career ==
Born in Pilar, Buenos Aires, Gómez began his career with Platense in 2001, playing three Primera B Nacional matches with the club. He then resumed his career in the lower leagues, notably representing Leandro N. Alem for three years.

== Managerial career ==
In 2012, Gómez met Favio Orsi while working in the coaching staff of Oscar Santángelo at Fénix. In April 2013, after Santángelo resigned, both Gómez and Orsi were named managers.

In June 2014, Gómez and Orsi were appointed in charge of Deportivo Español. The duo moved to Flandria in August 2015, and led the side to a first-ever promotion to the Primera B Nacional in their first season in charge, after winning the Primera B Metropolitana.

On 2 May 2018, after Flandria's relegation, both Gómez and Orsi left the side, and the duo took over Almagro on 5 June. They resigned the following 24 February, and both were named in charge of San Martín de Tucumán on 8 May 2019.

Dismissed by San Martín on 6 April 2021, Gómez and Orsi were named in charge of Ferro Carril Oeste on 20 July. Both resigned from the latter side on 20 December.

On 10 April 2022, Gómez and Orsi were appointed managers of Primera División side Godoy Cruz, in the place of Diego Flores. The duo left on a mutual agreement on 28 October.

On 3 July 2023, Gómez and Orsi were named in charge of Atlético Tucumán also in the top tier. Both resigned on 19 February 2024, and took over fellow league team Platense ten days later.

Despite leading Platense to the 2025 Apertura title, Gómez and Orsi resigned on 11 June 2025. On 19 December, the duo were named managers of Newell's Old Boys for the upcoming season, but both were sacked on 21 February 2026.

== Honours ==
=== Manager ===
Flandria

- Primera B Metropolitana: 2016

Platense

- Argentine Primera División: 2025 Apertura
