= 2025 Talleres de Córdoba season =

Talleres de Córdoba
2025 season
- Manager: Alexander Medina (until 3 April); Pablo Guiñazú (caretaker; 3 April–5 May); Carlos Tevez (from 9 July)
- Torneo Apertura: 14th
- Torneo Clausura: Pre-season
- Supercopa Internacional: Winner
- Copa Argentina: Round of 64
- Copa Libertadores: Group stage
- Average home league attendance: 52,624

The 2025 season is the 112th for Club Atlético Talleres and their 11th consecutive season in the Primera División. The club will also compete in the Supercopa Internacional, Copa Argentina and Copa Libertadores.

== Squad ==
=== Transfers In ===
Pos.	Player	Transferred from	Fee	Date	Source
MF	(Paraguay) Matías Galarza	(Brazil) Vasco da Gama	€1,400,000	1 January 2025	
MF	(Brazil) Rick	(Bulgaria) Ludogorets Razgrad	€6,000,000	18 January 2025	
DF	(Venezuela) Miguel Navarro	(United States) Colorado Rapids	Undisclosed	20 January 2025	
DF	(Argentina) José Luis Palomino	(Italy) Cagliari	Free	16 July 2025	
DF	(Argentina) Gabriel Báez	(Uruguay) Nacional	Undisclosed	24 July 2025	

=== Transfers Out ===
Pos.	Player	Transferred to	Fee	Date	Source
MF	(Colombia) Emerson Batalla	(Brazil) Juventude	Loan	13 January 2025	
MF	(Argentina) Franco Moyano	(Mexico) Puebla	Loan	17 January 2025	
DF	(Argentina) Alex Vigo	(Argentina) Sarmiento	Loan	20 January 2025	
MF	(Argentina) Carlos Villalba	(Argentina) Sarmiento	Loan	15 February 2025	
FW	(Argentina) Cristian Tarragona	(Argentina) Unión	Free	12 June 2025	
DF	(Paraguay) Blas Riveros	(Paraguay) Cerro Porteño	Undisclosed	30 June 2025	
DF	(Argentina) Gastón Benavídez	(Brazil) Athletico Paranaense	Loan	15 July 2025	
DF	(Argentina) Juan Carlos Portillo	(Argentina) River Plate	Undisclosed	24 July 2025	
MF	(Paraguay) Matías Galarza	(Argentina) River Plate	Undisclosed	24 July 2025	
MF	(Argentina) Alejandro Martínez	(Brazil) Cuiabá	Loan	30 July 2025	
MF	(Argentina) Gustavo Albarracín	(Spain) Deportivo Alavés B	Undisclosed	13 August 2025	

== Competitions ==
=== Overall record ===
Competition	First match	Last match	Starting round	Final position	Record							
Competition	First match	Last match	Starting round	Final position	Pld	W	D	L	GF	GA	GD	Win %
Torneo Apertura	25 January 2025	3 May 2025	Matchday 1	14th	16	2	7	7	11	15	−4	12.50
Torneo Clausura	11 July 2025		Matchday 1		3	1	1	1	3	3	+0	33.33
Supercopa Internacional	5 March 2025		Final	Winner	1	0	1	0	0	0	+0	0.00
Copa Argentina	19 March 2025	19 March 2025	Round of 64	Round of 64	1	0	1	0	3	3	+0	0.00
Copa Libertadores	2 April 2025	27 May 2025	Group stage	Group stage	6	1	1	4	0	3	−3	16.67
Total					27	4	11	12	17	24	−7	14.81

Last updated: 30 July 2025
Source: Competitions

=== Primera División ===
==== Torneo Apertura ====
===== League table =====
Pos	Team	Pld	W	D	L	GF	GA	GD	Pts
11	Gimnasia y Esgrima (LP)	16	4	4	8	9	18	−9	16
12	Sarmiento (J)	16	2	9	5	11	19	−8	15
13	Vélez Sarsfield	16	4	2	10	7	22	−15	14
14	Talleres (C)	16	2	7	7	11	15	−4	13
15	San Martín (SJ)	16	2	3	11	5	18	−13	9

Source: AFA

===== Results by round =====
Round	1
Ground	A
Result	
Position	

A = Away; H = Home; W = Win; D = Draw; L = Loss

===== Matches =====
25 January 2025 1	San Lorenzo	1–0	Talleres	Buenos Aires
17:00 UTC−3	Vombergar 81'	Report		Stadium: Estadio Pedro Bidegain

29 January 2025 2	Talleres	2–3	Independiente	Córdoba
17:00 UTC−3	Vera 4' (o.g.); Depietri 85'	Report	Rodríguez 17' (o.g.); Spörle 38'; Cabral 90+1'	Stadium: Estadio Mario Alberto Kempes

9 February 2025 4	Talleres	0–1	Lanús	Córdoba
21:30 UTC−3		Report	Bou 42'	Stadium: Estadio Mario Alberto Kempes

13 February 2025 5	San Martín	0–1	Talleres	San Juan
20:00 UTC−3		Report	Benavídez 64'	Stadium: Estadio Ingeniero Hilario Sánchez; Referee: Fernando Espinoza

16 February 2025 6	Talleres	1–1	Atlético Tucumán	Córdoba
--:-- UTC−3	Ortegoza 73'	Report	Castro 47'	Stadium: Estadio Mario Alberto Kempes; Referee: Carlos Andrés Gariano

21 February 2025 7	Deportivo Riestra	0–0	Talleres	Buenos Aires
--:-- UTC−3		Report		Stadium: Estadio Guillermo Laza; Referee: Fernando Echenique

1 March 2025 8	Talleres	1–2	Tigre	Córdoba
21:30 UTC−3	Benavídez 44'	Report	Romero 30'; Oviedo 66'	Stadium: Estadio Mario Alberto Kempes

10 March 2025 9	Talleres	0–0	Rosario Central	Córdoba
21:15 UTC−3		Report		Stadium: Estadio Mario Alberto Kempes

15 March 2025 10	Sarmiento	0–0	Talleres	Junín
--:-- UTC−3		Report		Stadium: Estadio Eva Perón; Referee: Ariel Penel

22 March 2025 3	Godoy Cruz	0–0	Talleres	Mendoza
17:00 UTC−3		Report		Stadium: Estadio Víctor Legrotaglie

30 March 2025 11	Belgrano	1–1	Talleres	Córdoba
--:-- UTC−3	Jara 66' (pen.)	Report	Rick 19'	Stadium: El Gigante de Alberdi; Referee: Sebastían Zunino

5 April 2025 12	Talleres	2–0	Gimnasia y Esgrima	Córdoba
--:-- UTC−3	Schott 16'; Ortegoza 65'	Report		Stadium: Estadio Mario Alberto Kempes

13 April 2025 13	River Plate	1–1	Talleres	Buenos Aires
21:15 (UTC−3)		Report		Stadium: Estadio Monumental; Referee: Nazareno Arasa

18 April 2025 14	Talleres	0–1	Vélez Sarsfield	Córdoba
19:15 UTC−3		Report	Carrizo 48'	Stadium: Estadio Mario Alberto Kempes

29 April 2025 15	Platense	2–1	Talleres	Florida
19:00 UTC−3	Mainero 51'; Martínez 53'	Report	Schott 22'	Stadium: Estadio Ciudad de Vicente López; Referee: Luis Lobo Medina

3 May 2025 16	Talleres	1–2	Instituto	Córdoba
16:00 UTC−3	Galarza 13'	Report	Luna 43'; Puebla 80'	Stadium: Estadio Mario Alberto Kempes; Referee: Darío Herrera

==== Torneo Clausura ====
===== League table =====
Pos	Team	Pld	W	D	L	GF	GA	GD	Pts	Qualification
6	River Plate	16	6	4	6	20	15	+5	22	Advance to round of 16
7	Gimnasia y Esgrima (LP)	16	7	1	8	14	16	−2	22	Advance to round of 16
8	Talleres (C)	16	5	6	5	9	12	−3	21	Advance to round of 16
9	Sarmiento (J)	16	5	5	6	13	17	−4	20	
10	San Martín (SJ)	16	4	7	5	13	16	−3	19	

Source: AFA

===== Results by round =====
Round	1
Ground	
Result	
Position	

A = Away; H = Home; W = Win; D = Draw; L = Loss

===== Matches =====
11 July 2025 1	Talleres	1–2	San Lorenzo	Córdoba
20:00 UTC−3	Sequeira 45+2'	Report	Cuello 3'; Portilla 85' (o.g.)	Stadium: Estadio Mario Alberto Kempes

20 July 2025 2	Independiente	1–2	Talleres	Avellaneda
21:00 UTC−3	Freire 56'	Report	Schott 27'; Depietri 79'	Stadium: Estadio Libertadores de América

27 July 2025 3	Talleres	0–0	Godoy Cruz	Córdoba
16:00 UTC−3		Report		Stadium: Estadio Mario Alberto Kempes

8 August 2025 4	Lanús	1–0	Talleres	Lanús
21:15 UTC−3	Castillo 45+1'	Report		Stadium: Estadio Ciudad de Lanús

18 August 2025 5	Talleres	0–0	San Martín	Córdoba
21:00 UTC−3		Report		Stadium: Estadio Mario Alberto Kempes; Referee: Nazareno Arasa

=== Supercopa Internacional ===
5 March 2025 Final	River Plate	0–0 (a.e.t.) (2–3 p)	Talleres	Asunción (Paraguay)
20:00 UTC-3		Report		Stadium: Estadio General Pablo Rojas; Referee: Maximiliano Nicolás Ramírez
	Penalties
	Rojas (penalty missed); Martínez (penalty scored); Borja (penalty scored); Montiel (penalty missed); Colidio (penalty missed); Lanzini (penalty missed)		(penalty missed) Reynoso; (penalty scored) Mosqueira; (penalty missed) Tarragona; (penalty missed) Ortegoza; (penalty scored) Bustos; (penalty scored) Benavídez

=== Copa Argentina ===
19 March 2025 Round of 64	Talleres	3–3 (4–5 p)	Deportivo Armenio	Santa Fe, Pcia. de Santa Fe
18:00	Tarragona 16'; Botta 18'; Reynoso 75'	Report	Herrera 49', 52', 54'	Stadium: Brigadier General Estanislao López; Referee: Nicolás Lamolina
	Penalties
	Girotti (penalty scored); Ortegoza (penalty scored); Reynoso (penalty missed); Mosqueira (penalty scored); Bustos (penalty scored); J. Portillo (penalty missed)		(penalty scored) Pérez; (penalty scored) Troxler; (penalty missed) López; (penalty scored) Montero; (penalty scored) Ávalos; (penalty scored) Motta

=== Copa Libertadores ===
==== Group stage ====
The draw for the group stage was held on 17 March 2025, 20:00 PYST (UTC−3), at the CONMEBOL Convention Centre in Luque, Paraguay.

Pos	Team	Pld	W	D	L	GF	GA	GD	Pts	Qualification	SPA	LIB	ALI	TAL
1	(Brazil) São Paulo	6	4	2	0	10	4	+6	14	Advance to round of 16	—	1–1	2–2	2–1
2	(Paraguay) Libertad	6	2	3	1	6	5	+1	9	Advance to round of 16	0–2	—	2–2	2–0
3	(Peru) Alianza Lima	6	1	2	3	7	11	−4	5	Transfer to Copa Sudamericana	0–2	0–1	—	3–2
4	(Argentina) Talleres	6	1	1	4	5	8	−3	4		0–1	0–0	2–0	—

Source: CONMEBOL
Rules for classification: 1) Points; 2) Goal difference; 3) Goals scored; 4) Away goals scored; 5) CONMEBOL ranking.

2 April 2025 1	Talleres (Argentina)	0–1	(Brazil) São Paulo	Córdoba, Argentina
21:30 UTC−3		Report	Alisson 76'	Stadium: Estadio Mario Alberto Kempes; Attendance: 28,991; Referee: Felipe González (Chile)

8 April 2025 2	Libertad (Paraguay)	2–0	(Argentina) Talleres	Asunción, Paraguay
19:00 UTC−3	Franco 9'; Alcaraz 57'	Report		Stadium: Estadio La Huerta; Referee: Esteban Ostojich (Uruguay)

22 April 2025 3	Alianza Lima (Peru)	3–2	(Argentina) Talleres	Lima, Peru
19:30 UTC−5	Guerrero 11', 57'; Barcos 90+5'	Report	Girotti 64' (pen.), 69'	Stadium: Estadio Alejandro Villanueva; Referee: Andrés Rojas (Colombia)

8 May 2025 4	Talleres (Argentina)	0–0	(Paraguay) Libertad	Córdoba, Argentina
19:00 UTC−3		Report		Stadium: Estadio Mario Alberto Kempes; Referee: Gustavo Tejera (Uruguay)

15 May 2025 5	Talleres (Argentina)	2–0	(Peru) Alianza Lima	Córdoba, Argentina
19:00 UTC−3	Botta 23'; Depietri 38'	Report		Stadium: Estadio Mario Alberto Kempes; Referee: Gery Vargas (Bolivia)

27 May 2025 6	São Paulo (Brazil)	2–1	(Argentina) Talleres	São Paulo, Brazil
19:00 UTC−3	Sabino 26'; Luciano 84'	Report	Girotti 39'	Stadium: Estádio do Morumbi; Referee: Piero Maza (Chile)
