= 2023 Supercopa Internacional =

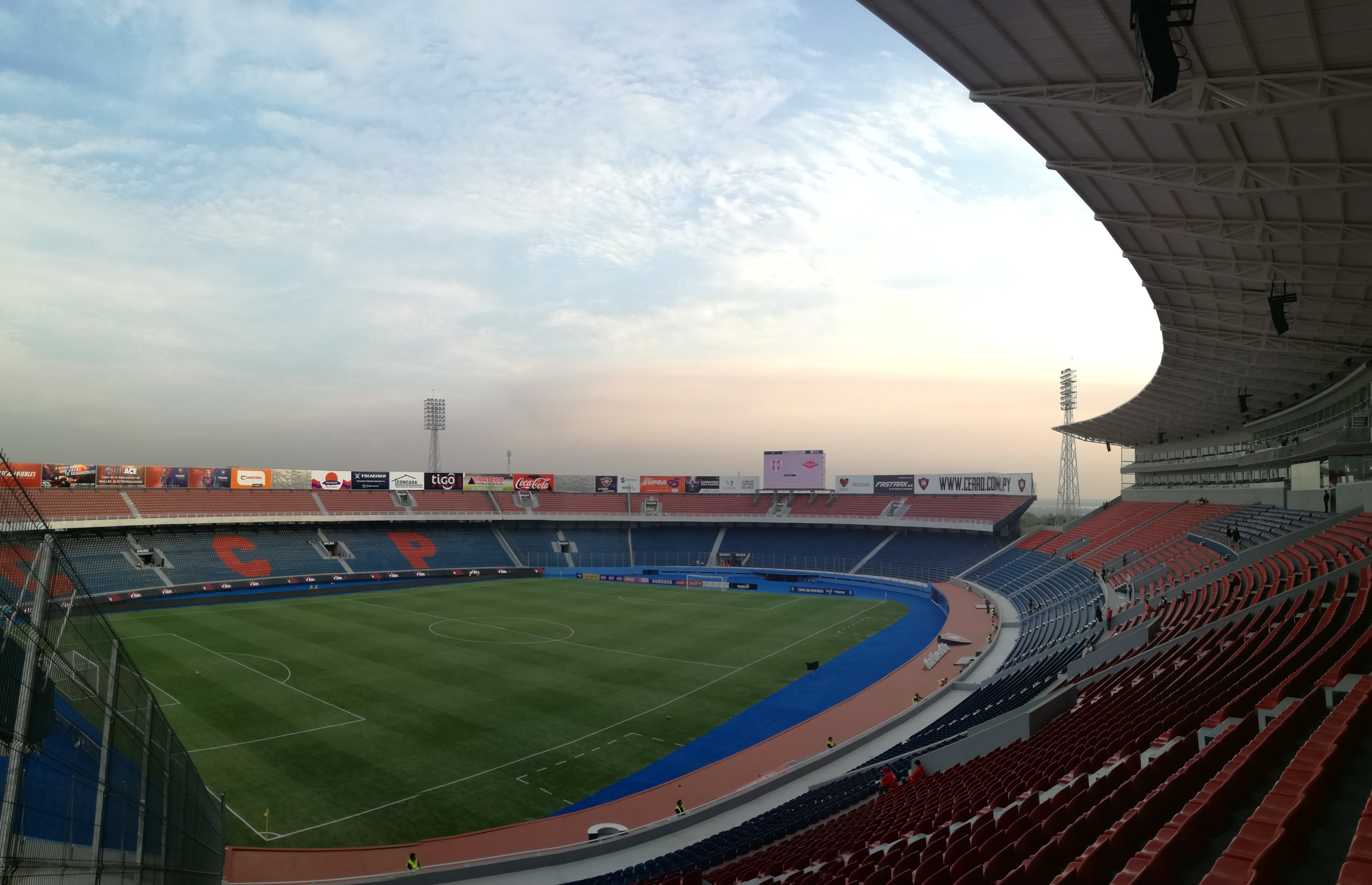
- The Estadio General Pablo Rojas in Asunción, hosted the match
River Plate	Talleres (C)
0	0
- After extra time Talleres (C) won 3–2 on penalties
- Date: 5 March 2025
- Venue: Estadio General Pablo Rojas, Asunción, Paraguay
- Referee: Maximiliano Nicolás Ramírez

The 2023 Supercopa Internacional (officially the Supercopa Internacional Mostaza 2025 for sponsorship reasons) was the second edition of the Supercopa Internacional, an annual football match contested by the winners of the Trofeo de Campeones de la Liga Profesional and the best team in the Argentine Primera División aggregate table for the season.

Since River Plate were the winners of the 2023 Trofeo de Campeones and the best team in the 2023 Primera División aggregate table, the match was played between River Plate and Talleres (C) (second best team in the 2023 Primera División aggregate table).

The 2023 Supercopa Internacional was originally scheduled to be played in Abu Dhabi, but the tournament's organizers, AFA and the Abu Dhabi Sports Council, cancelled the agreement between them and the match was moved to another venue. In December 2024, it was announced that AFA had formed a partnership with media company Torneos y Competencias to relaunch the competition, with the 2023 edition to be held on 5 March 2025 at the Estadio General Pablo Rojas in Asunción, Paraguay.

Talleres (C) defeated River Plate 3–2 on penalties to claim their first title after a 0–0 draw in extra time.

== Qualified teams ==
- Note: **Bold** indicates winners

Team	Qualification	Previous appearances
River Plate	2023 Trofeo de Campeones champions	(none)
Talleres (C)	2023 Primera División aggregate table second best team	(none)

== Match ==
=== Details ===
2023 Supercopa Internacional
5 March 2025
20:00 UTC-3

River Plate	0–0 (a.e.t.)	Talleres (C)
	Report
Penalties
Rojas (penalty missed); Martínez (penalty scored); Borja (penalty scored); Montiel (penalty missed); Colidio (penalty missed); Lanzini (penalty missed)	2–3	(penalty missed) Reynoso; (penalty scored) Mosqueira; (penalty missed) Tarragona; (penalty missed) Ortegoza; (penalty scored) Bustos; (penalty scored) Benavídez

Estadio General Pablo Rojas, Asunción (Paraguay)
Referee: Maximiliano Nicolás Ramírez

**River Plate**	**Talleres (C)**

GK	1	(Argentina) Franco Armani (c)
DF	4	(Argentina) Gonzalo Montiel
DF	6	(Argentina) Germán Pezzella	(yellow card) 25'
DF	28	(Argentina) Lucas Martínez Quarta		(substituted off) 69'
DF	20	(Argentina) Milton Casco
MF	24	(Argentina) Enzo Pérez	(yellow card) 21'	(substituted off) 91'
MF	31	(Argentina) Santiago Simón	(yellow card) 58'	(substituted off) 69'
MF	8	(Argentina) Maximiliano Meza		(substituted off) 91'
MF	30	(Argentina) Franco Mastantuono		(substituted off) 65'
FW	15	(Argentina) Sebastián Driussi		(substituted off) 36'
FW	9	(Colombia) Miguel Borja	(yellow card) 99'
Substitutes:
GK	25	(Argentina) Conan Ledesma
DF	14	(Argentina) Leandro González Pírez
DF	16	(Argentina) Fabricio Bustos
DF	17	(Chile) Paulo Díaz		(substituted on) 69'
DF	21	(Argentina) Marcos Acuña
MF	5	(Argentina) Matías Kranevitter		(substituted on) 91'
MF	7	(Paraguay) Matías Rojas		(substituted on) 91'
MF	10	(Argentina) Manuel Lanzini		(substituted on) 69'
MF	18	(Argentina) Pity Martínez		(substituted on) 65'
MF	26	(Argentina) Ignacio Fernández
FW	11	(Argentina) Facundo Colidio		(substituted on) 36'
FW	38	(Argentina) Ian Subiabre
Manager:
(Argentina) Marcelo Gallardo

GK	22	(Argentina) Guido Herrera (c)
DF	29	(Argentina) Gastón Benavídez	(yellow card) 19'
DF	28	(Argentina) Juan Portillo
DF	6	(Argentina) Juan Rodríguez
DF	16	(Venezuela) Miguel Navarro		(substituted off) 118'
MF	27	(Colombia) Juan Portilla	(yellow card) 84'	(substituted off) 104'
MF	30	(Chile) Ulises Ortegoza	(yellow card) 83'
MF	11	(Argentina) Valentín Depietri	(yellow card) 15'	(substituted off) 62'
MF	10	(Argentina) Rubén Botta		(substituted off) 75'
MF	8	(Paraguay) Matías Galarza	(yellow card) 77'	(substituted off) 105'
FW	9	(Argentina) Federico Girotti		(substituted off) 75'
Substitutes:
GK	1	(Ecuador) Javier Burrai
DF	3	(Argentina) Tomás Cardona
DF	15	(Paraguay) Blas Riveros		(substituted on) 105'
DF	20	(Argentina) Augusto Schott
DF	44	(Argentina) Santiago Fernández
MF	17	(Argentina) Joaquín Mosqueira		(substituted on) 104'
MF	26	(Argentina) Marcos Portillo
MF	33	(Argentina) Emanuel Reynoso		(substituted on) 75'
FW	7	(Argentina) Nahuel Bustos		(substituted on) 75'
FW	25	(Argentina) Cristian Tarragona		(substituted on) 118'
FW	34	(Argentina) Sebastián Palacios
FW	77	(Brazil) Rick		(substituted on) 62'
Manager:
(Uruguay) Alexander Medina			(yellow card) 77'

Assistant referees:
Pablo González
Pablo Acevedo
Fourth official:
Nazareno Arasa
Fifth official:
Juan Mamani
Video assistant referee:
Lucas Novelli
Assistant video assistant referees:
Pablo Dóvalo

**Match rules**

- 90 minutes.
- 30 minutes of extra time if necessary.
- Penalty shoot-out if scores still level.
- Twelve named substitutes.
- Maximum of five substitutions, with a sixth allowed in extra time.

=== Statistics ===
Overall
	River Plate	Talleres (C)
Goals scored	0	0
Total shots	17	11
Shots on target	11	6
Ball possession	57%	43%
Corner kicks	8	2
Fouls committed	14	21
Offsides	5	4
Yellow cards	4	6
Red cards	0	0

2023 Supercopa Internacional winners
**Talleres (C)**
**1st Title**
