= 2026 Supercopa Internacional =

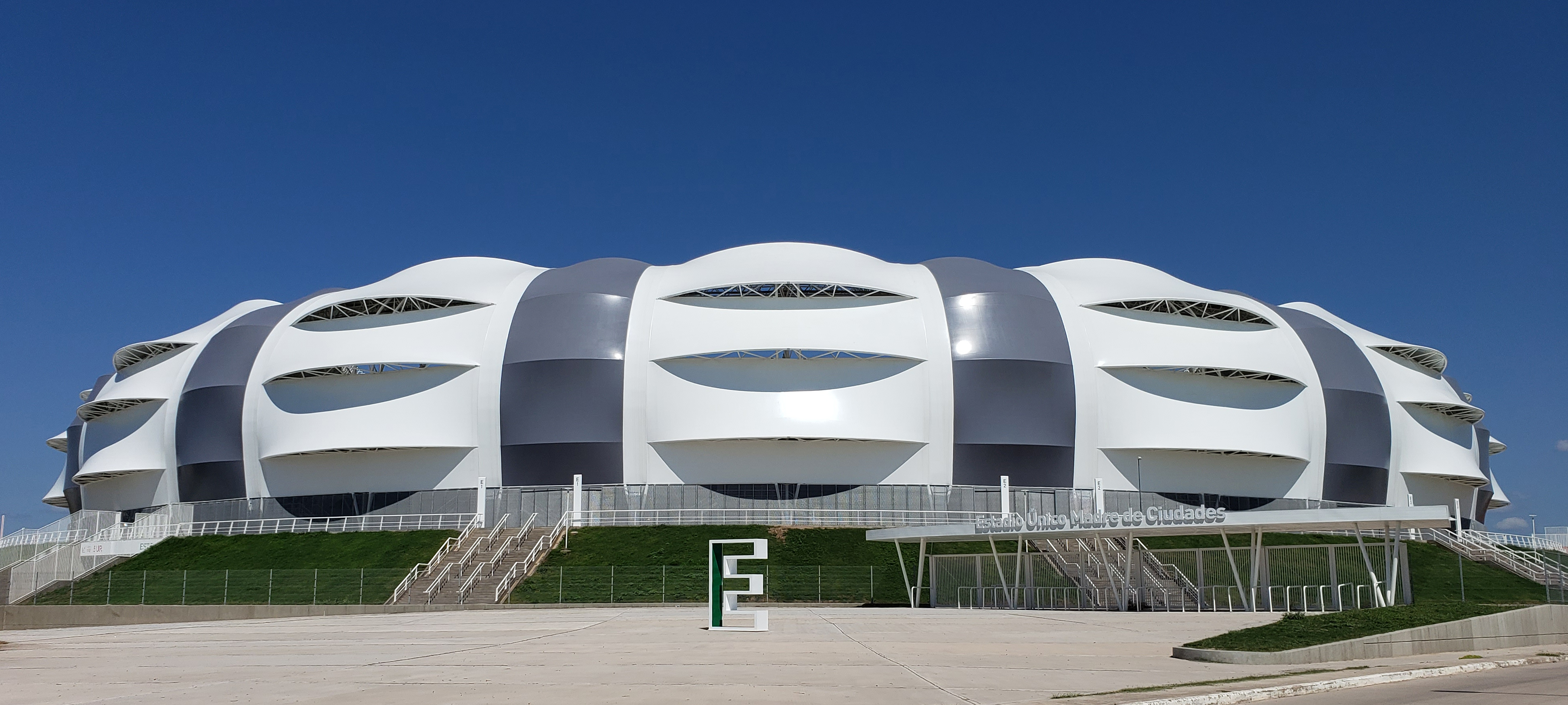
- The Estadio Único Madre de Ciudades in Santiago del Estero hosted the match
Estudiantes (LP)	Rosario Central
1	3
- Date: 26 September 2026
- Venue: Estadio Único Madre de Ciudades, Santiago del Estero
- Referee: Darío Herrera

The 2026 Supercopa Internacional was the fourth edition of the Supercopa Internacional, an annual football match contested by the winners of the Trofeo de Campeones de la Liga Profesional and the best team in the AFA Liga Profesional de Fútbol aggregate table for the season.

The trophy was contested by Estudiantes (LP) (winners of 2025 Trofeo de Campeones) and Rosario Central (best team in the 2025 AFA Liga Profesional de Fútbol aggregate table).

The possibility of holding the 2026 Supercopa Internacional in Paraguay on 18 March 2026 was considered, but ultimately AFA decided to hold the tournament in the second half of 2026. In May 2026, it was confirmed that the match would be played on 26 September 2026, and Uruguay emerged as the most likely host for the game. Finally, on 1 September 2026, AFA announced that the match would take place at the Estadio Único Madre de Ciudades in Santiago del Estero. Although the tournament had originally been scheduled to take place outside of Argentina, this was the second consecutive Supercopa Internacional to be held within the country, following the 2024 edition, which took place in Avellaneda.

Rosario Central defeated Estudiantes (LP) 3–1 to win their first title.

The match was highly controversial due to referee Darío Herrera's performance, who –according to the media reports– committed severe mistakes that harmed Estudiantes LP. The scandal included fist fights between players of both teams

== Background ==
Memories of the controversial guard of honor from November 2025 resurfaced in the lead-up to the match during a press conference, bringing the differing stances of Ignacio Ovando and Leandro González Pirez into the public eye; both offered their own versions of an incident that continues to spark debate.

The story dates back to November 23, 2025, when Rosario Central arrived at the Estadio Gigante de Arroyito as champions and were at the center of one of that season's most talked-about moments. The Estudiantes de La Plata players decided against forming the traditional guard of honor, turning their backs on the Rosario team as they took the field. Ovando acknowledged that the squad viewed the gesture as an insult and admitted that the memory still serves as motivation for the upcoming decisive match. "For us —as Marco Ruben rightly said before we headed over here— it was a sign of disrespect. That's how we took it; it really hurt us" the defender stated.

On the other hand, González Pirez insisted that the gesture was not directed at the Central players but was instead a response to a decision made by the club's leadership. "We clarified it a million times: it was never against Central. On the contrary, we highly praised the season they had; we simply disagreed with the decision that had been made".

== Qualified teams ==
- Note: **Bold** indicates winners

Team	Qualification	Previous app.
Estudiantes (LP)	2025 Trofeo de Campeones champions	1 (2024)
Rosario Central	2025 Liga Profesional aggregate table best team	(none)

== Match ==
=== Summary ===
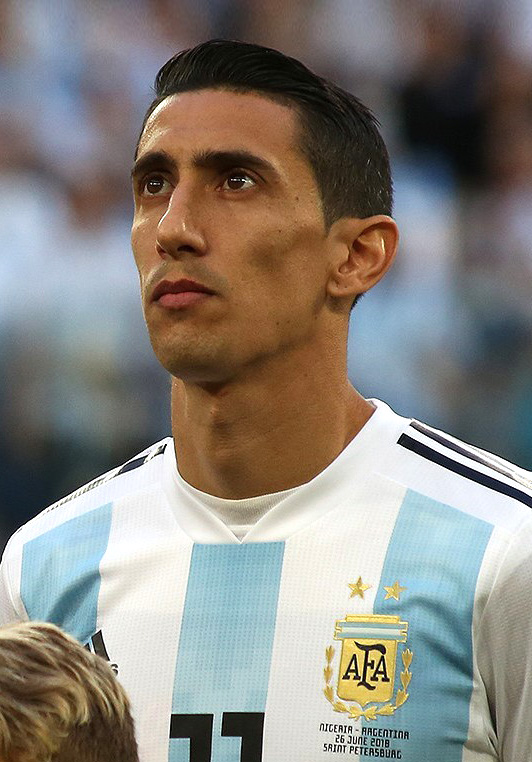
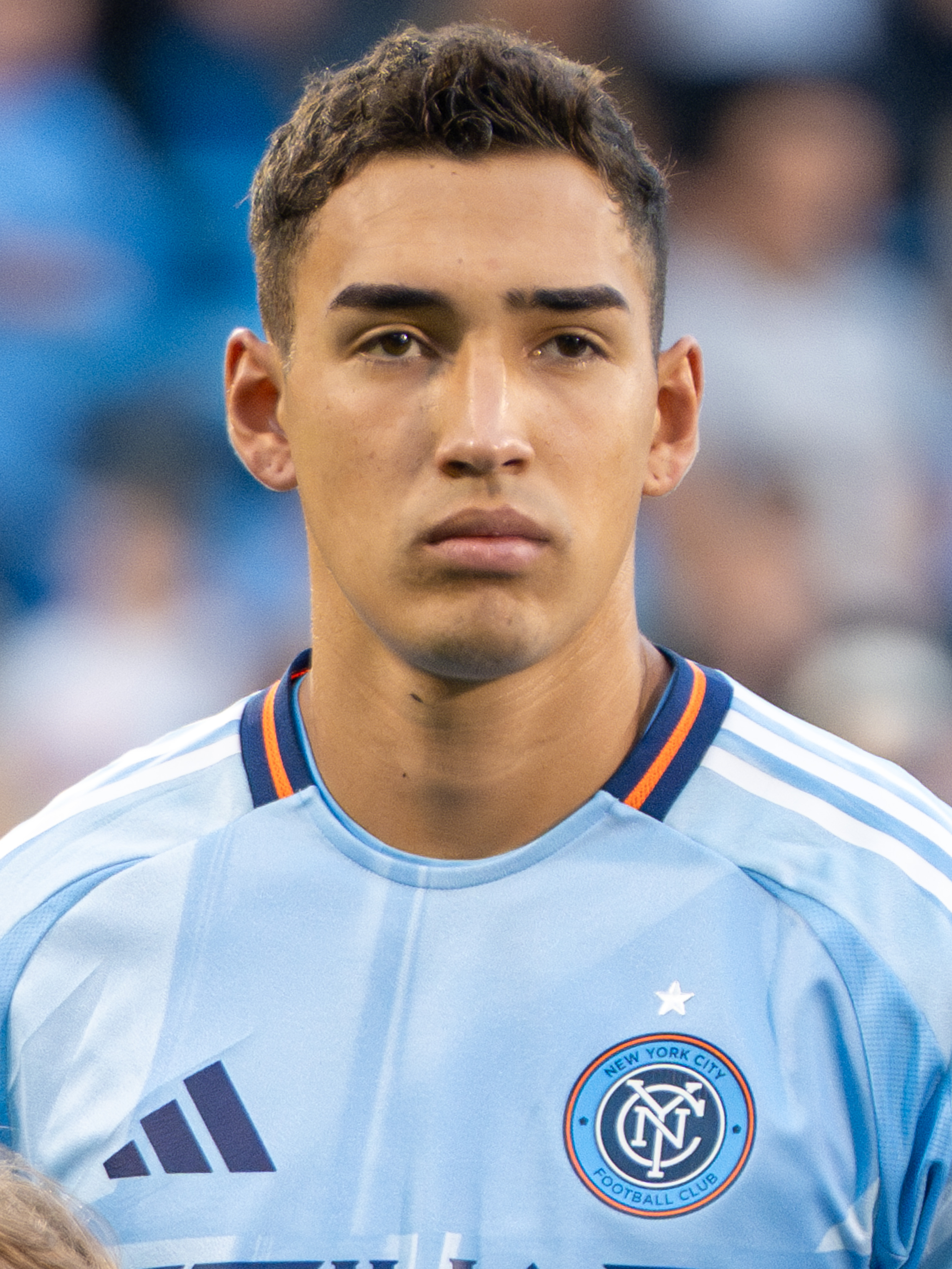
Angel Di María (two times) and Julián Fernández were the scorers for Rosario Central

Just one minute into the game, Joaquín Tobio Burgos made a surging run down the left flank and crossed to the far post; Guido Carrillo headed the ball down to Alexis Castro, who tapped it in to make it 1–0. Despite the early lead, the start of the match was somewhat troubled for the La Plata side, who lost Gabriel Neves to injury (he was taken away by ambulance with a left wrist injury) and then Jalil Elías —who had replaced the Uruguayan but left the pitch just minutes later due to a physical ailment.

In the 23rd minute, Ángel Di María struck a free-kick that found the top corner —aided by goalkeeper Fernando Muslera, who left his near post exposed— to level the score. The game became scrappy and disjointed. The Rosario side nearly took the lead through a left-footed shot from Di María, while Alexander Medina's team threatened with a right-footed strike from Eros Mancuso. Just before halftime, Enzo Copetti went down at the edge of the penalty area while running alongside Leandro González Pírez; moments later, VAR official Jorge Baliño summoned Herrera to review a potential foul. The footage did not appear conclusive, but the on-field referee deemed the contact sufficient to award a penalty. Di María converted the spot-kick to put his team in front.

In the second half, Estudiantes LP pressed forward but lacked creativity, relying heavily on long balls. To make matters worse, the team lost Guido Carrillo to discomfort; he chose to ask for a substitution to avoid an actual injury. Di María and Giovanni Cantizano had the chance to put the game away, but Muslera made two saves to keep Estudiantes alive. In a controversial decision, the officials failed to send off Elías Verón —who was already on a yellow card— after a massive kick against Adolfo Gaich (VAR has the authority to flag a sending-off resulting from a second yellow). Near the end, Gaich headed the ball inside the box and it struck Ignacio Ovando's arm, yet the officials once again declined to review a play that seemed, at the very least, controversial.

In the match's final play, Fernando Muslera went up for a corner kick; Central broke away on the counter-attack, and Julián Fernández sealed the win by scoring into the unguarded net.

=== Details ===
26 September 2026
16:00 UTC-3

Estudiantes (LP)	1–3	Rosario Central
Castro 1'	Report	Di María 22', 45+11' (pen.); Fernández 90+5'

Estadio Único Madre de Ciudades, Santiago del Estero
Referee: Darío Herrera

**Estudiantes (LP)**	**Rosario Central**

GK	16	(Uruguay) Fernando Muslera
DF	40	(Argentina) Eros Mancuso		(substituted off) 46'
DF	4	(Argentina) Santiago Núñez	(yellow card) 54'
DF	14	(Argentina) Leandro González Pírez
DF	24	(Argentina) Tomás Palacios	(yellow card) 45+13'
MF	8	(Uruguay) Gabriel Neves		(substituted off) 11'
MF	21	(Argentina) Ezequiel Piovi	(yellow card) 81'
MF	31	(Argentina) Baltasar Rodríguez	(yellow card) 36'	(substituted off) 46'
MF	22	(Argentina) Alexis Castro
MF	17	(Argentina) Joaquín Tobio Burgos
FW	9	(Argentina) Guido Carrillo (c)		(substituted off) 65'
Substitutions:
GK	1	(Argentina) Fabricio Iacovich	(red card) 90+6'
DF	13	(Argentina) Gastón Benedetti
DF	20	(Argentina) Eric Meza		(substituted on) 46'
DF	26	(Argentina) Ramiro Funes Mori
MF	7	(Argentina) José Sosa
MF	39	(Syria) Jalil Elías	(yellow card) 16'	(substituted on) 11'	(substituted off) 18'
MF	52	(Argentina) Bautista Kociubinski
FW	18	(Colombia) Edwuin Cetré
FW	19	(Argentina) Adolfo Gaich		(substituted on) 46'
FW	27	(Argentina) Lucas Alario		(substituted on) 65'
FW	28	(Argentina) Brian Aguirre
FW	29	(Argentina) Fabricio Pérez			(substituted on) 18'
Manager:
(Uruguay) Alexander Medina

GK	1	(Argentina) Axel Werner
DF	32	(Argentina) Emanuel Coronel
DF	46	(Argentina) Ignacio Ovando
DF	13	(Argentina) Gastón Ávila	(yellow card) 72'
DF	3	(Paraguay) Agustín Sández	(red card) 90+6'	(substituted off) 73'
MF	5	(Argentina) Franco Ibarra
MF	31	(Argentina) Federico Navarro
MF	27	(Argentina) Gaspar Duarte		(substituted off) 46'
MF	11	(Argentina) Ángel Di María (c)		(substituted off) 79'
MF	26	(Argentina) Giovanni Cantizano		(substituted off) 79'
FW	22	(Argentina) Enzo Copetti
Substitutions:
GK	23	(Argentina) Conan Ledesma
DF	2	(Paraguay) Sebastián Zaracho
DF	6	(Argentina) Juan Komar
DF	15	(Uruguay) Facundo Mallo		(substituted on) 79'
DF	24	(Argentina) Juan Giménez
DF	33	(Argentina) Alexis Soto			(substituted on) 65'
DF	42	(Argentina) Elías Verón	(yellow card) 61'	(substituted on) 46'	(substituted off) 65'
MF	19	(Argentina) Santiago Segovia
FW	9	(Argentina) Marco Ruben
FW	10	(Argentina) Franco Cervi		(substituted on) 79'
FW	16	(Argentina) Tomás Badaloni
FW	18	(Argentina) Julián Fernández	(yellow card) 90+6'	(substituted on) 73'
Manager:
(Argentina) Jorge Almirón

Assistant referees:
Gabriel Chade
Cristian Navarro
Fourth official:
Maximiliano Manduca
Fifth official:
Federico Cano
Video assistant referee:
Jorge Baliño
Assistant video assistant referees:
Mauro Ramos Errasti

**Match rules**

- 90 minutes
- 30 minutes of extra time if necessary
- Penalty shoot-out if scores still level
- Twelve named substitutes
- Maximum of five substitutions, with a sixth allowed in extra time

=== Statistics ===
Overall
	Estudiantes (LP)	Rosario Central
Goals scored	1	3
Total shots	13	10
Shots on target	6	7
Ball possession	57%	43%
Corner kicks	3	4
Fouls committed	12	13
Offsides	0	3
Yellow cards	5	3
Red cards	1	1

2026 Supercopa Internacional winners
**Rosario Central**
**1st Title**

== Controversies ==
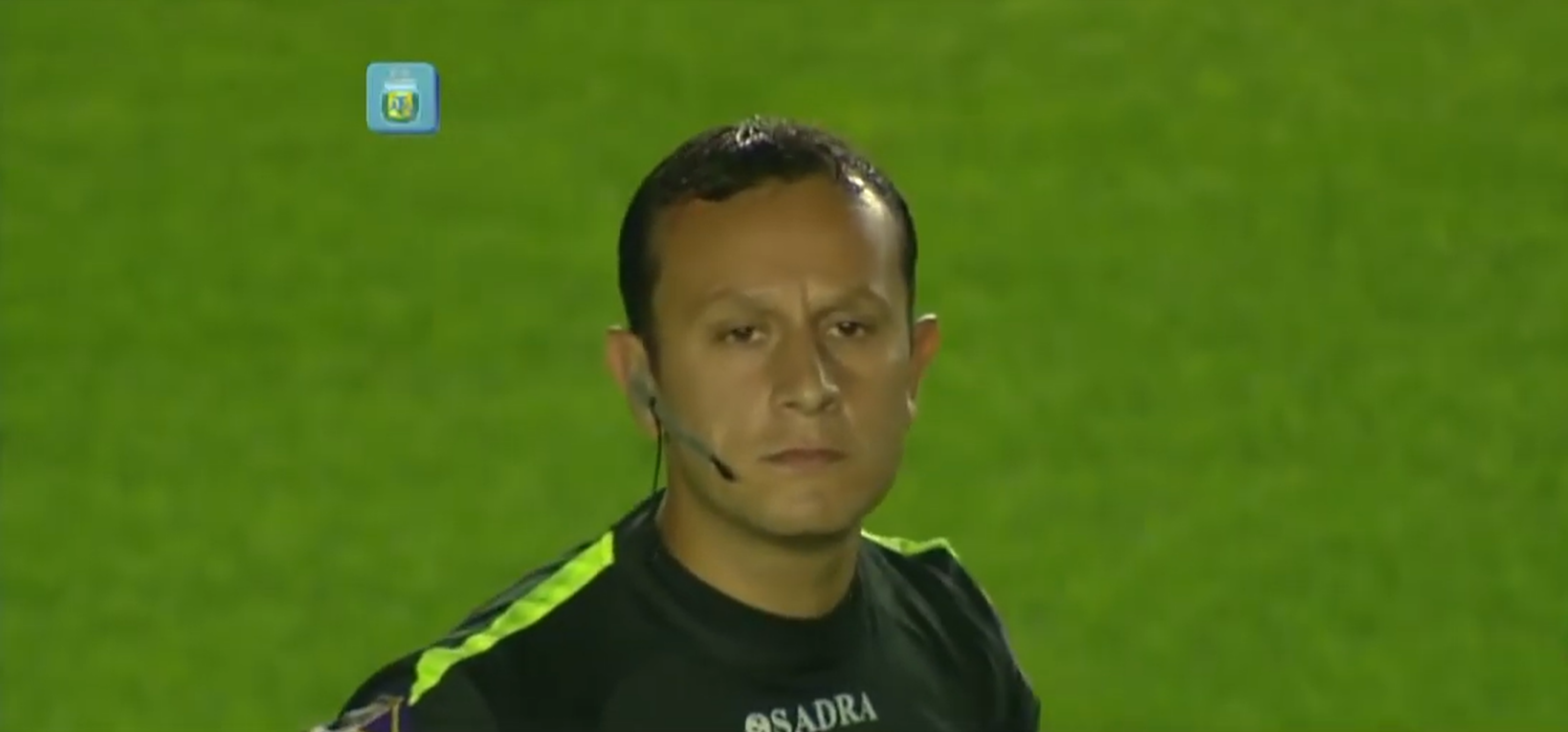
Referee Darío Herrera was heavily critisized by Estudiantes LP's fans and executive members due to his performance

Darío Herrera's rulings received negative criticism from both the media and fans and caused the match to become the most controversial final in the history of the competition.

The first incident occurred in the 52nd minute of stoppage time. Following a challenge by Leandro González Pirez, Enzo Copetti went down on the edge of the penalty area, claiming he had been struck by the defender. Faced with uncertainty over whether the contact occurred inside or outside the box, the VAR official summoned referee Herrera; although Herrera initially believed the forward had dived, he ultimately reversed his decision and awarded a penalty.

The entire Estudiantes team immediately protested the referee's decision. Even their manager Alexander Medina was gesticulating and complaining from the sideline. However, the decision stood, and Di María ultimately converted the penalty for the afternoon's second goal. Amidst the protests, television cameras panned to the stands, focusing on the section where Estudiantes president Juan Sebastián Verón was seated. There, La Brujita was seen smiling and applauding the referee —an ironic gesture.

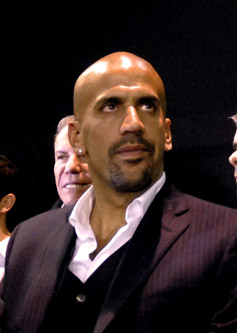
President of Estudiantes LP Juan S. Verón entered the pitch to confront referee Herrera, blaming him for the loss

The second half brought another controversial moment after defender Elías Verón committed a foul on forward Adolfo Gaich —an incident many felt warranted a yellow card, which would have resulted in his sending-off since he had already been booked. However, referee Herrera merely called the foul without issuing the second yellow. Despite having sent him onto the pitch at halftime, Rosario Central manager Jorge Almirón, quickly decided to substitute Verón out of the match to prevent him from receiving that second yellow card.

After a header by Gaich inside the box, the ball appeared to strike Ignacio Ovando somewhere between his chest and arm. Although it wasn't entirely clear whether a handball had occurred, the Estudiantes players protested the incident; however, Herrera didn't even consult VAR, which once again sparked the players' anger.

The celebration —and some taunting— sparked a mass brawl between players from both sides, meaning the match never actually had a final whistle. There was a chaotic scramble back to the dressing rooms and a delayed return to the pitch, while the officiating crew remained passive; they gave no instructions on how to proceed, simply waiting for the conflict to die down. Juan Sebastián Verón entered the field and confronted Darío Herrera, telling him: "This is all on you".

During the medal ceremony, president of AFA Claudio Tapia did not go up on stage when Estudiantes were being awarded, but he did so when the referees and the Central squad appeared.
