= Ignacio Ovando =

Argentine footballer (born 2007)

Personal information
- Date of birth: 29 June 2007 (age 19)
- Place of birth: Gualeguaychú, Argentina
- Height: 1.82 m (6 ft 0 in)
- Position: Defender

Team information
- Current team: Rosario Central
- Number: 46

Youth career
- Central Córdoba
- 2018–2025: Rosario Central

Senior career*
Years	Team	Apps	(Gls)
2025–	Rosario Central	28	(2)
- * Club domestic league appearances and goals as of 17 September 2026

Ignacio Ovando (born 29 June 2007) is an Argentine professional footballer who plays as a defender for Rosario Central.

== Club career ==
Born in Gualeguaychú, Entre Ríos, Ovando is a youth product of Central Córdoba and Rosario Central.

In April 2025, he signed his first professional contract with Rosario Central.

Ovando made his professional debut with Central in a 2–1 Argentine Primera División win over River Plate on 5 October 2025. By the end of the season, he had become a starter with the team from Rosario that eventually won the 2025 league.

By early 2026, Ovando was an immovable starter and key player with Ángel Di María's team

== International career ==
In the summer of 2026, Ovando was called-up by Lionel Scaloni to train with the Argentine senior squad in the United States, to prepare for the 2026 World Cup.

== Style of play ==
Formerly raised as a striker, Ovando was moved down the field when he arrived at Rosario Central, becoming a centre-back. As a defender, he is said to stand out for his excellent footwork and aerial play.

== Honours ==
Rosario Central

- Primera División: 2025 Liga
- Supercopa Internacional: 2026
