= Matías Galarza (Paraguayan footballer) =

Paraguayan footballer (born 2002)

- Galarza with Paraguay in 2026

Personal information
- Full name: Matías Galarza Fonda
- Date of birth: 11 February 2002 (age 24)
- Place of birth: Asunción, Paraguay
- Height: 1.75 m (5 ft 9 in)
- Position: Midfielder

Team information
- Current team: Inter Miami (on loan from River Plate)
- Number: 80

Youth career
- 2015–2021: Olimpia
- 2020–2021: → Vasco da Gama (loan)

Senior career*
Years	Team	Apps	(Gls)
2021	Olimpia	0	(0)
2021	→ Vasco da Gama (loan)	10	(2)
2021–2025	Vasco da Gama	54	(5)
2022	→ Coritiba (loan)	11	(0)
2023–2024	→ Talleres (loan)	40	(5)
2025	Talleres	13	(0)
2025–	River Plate	10	(0)
2026	→ Atlanta United (loan)	10	(0)
2026–	→ Inter Miami (loan)	2	(0)

International career^{‡}
2017	Paraguay U15		
2019	Paraguay U17	3	(0)
2022–	Paraguay	21	(4)
- * Club domestic league appearances and goals as of 22:45, 20 September 2026 (UTC) ‡ National team caps and goals as of 2 October 2026

Matías Galarza Fonda (born 11 February 2002) is a Paraguayan professional footballer who plays as a midfielder for Major League Soccer club Inter Miami, on loan from Argentine Primera División club River Plate, and in the Paraguay national team.

== Club career ==
Born in Asunción, Galarza represented hometown side Olimpia. On 19 June 2020, he moved on loan to Brazilian club Vasco da Gama until 2022, and was initially assigned to the under-20 squad.

After impressing with the under-20s, Galarza made his senior debut on 3 March 2021, after coming on as a half-time substitute for Vinícius in a 0–1 Campeonato Carioca home loss against Portuguesa; at the age of 19, he became the youngest foreigner to play for Vasco in the 21st century. He scored his first goal as a professional on 24 March, netting his team's third in a 3–1 home success over Macaé.

On 20 May 2021, Galarza signed a permanent contract with Vasco until 2025, after the club bought 60% of his economic rights for a fee of US$ 500,000. A regular starter during the remainder of the campaign, he lost his starting spot in 2022.

On 4 April 2022, Galarza moved to Série A side Coritiba on loan for the remainder of the year. He later joined Talleres on loan with an option to buy on 31 August 2023.

On 24 July 2025, he joined River Plate, signing a contract until 31 December 2028. In March 2026, he joined MLS side Atlanta United on loan with an option to make the move permanent in the summer. Later that year, on 3 September, he joined Inter Miami on loan through the 2026 season, with an option to make the move permanent.

== International career ==
Galarza playing for Paraguay at the 2026 FIFA World Cup

Galarza made his debut for the Paraguay national team on 31 August 2022, in a 1–0 friendly victory against Mexico.

He was selected in the 26-man squad for the 2026 FIFA World Cup. In Paraguay's second match of the tournament, he scored the only goal after 64 seconds and was named Man of the Match in a 1–0 victory over Turkey, despite his side playing the entire second half with ten men. This recorded the fastest goal of the tournament to date, surpassing the previous record of 71 seconds set by Morocco's Ismael Saibari against Scotland hours earlier in Boston.

== Career statistics ==
=== Club ===
As of match played 20 September 2026

Appearances and goals by club, season and competition
Club	Season	League			State league		National cup		Continental		Other		Total	
Club	Season	Division	Apps	Goals	Apps	Goals	Apps	Goals	Apps	Goals	Apps	Goals	Apps	Goals
Vasco da Gama	2021	Série B	21	1	11	2	4	0	—		—		36	3
Vasco da Gama	2022	Série B	0	0	5	0	0	0	—		—		5	0
Vasco da Gama	2023	Série A	10	1	7	1	0	0	—		—		17	2
Vasco da Gama	Total		31	2	23	3	4	0	—		—		58	5
Coritiba (loan)	2022	Série A	11	0	—		0	0	—		—		11	0
Talleres (loan)	2023	AFA Liga Profesional de Fútbol	9	0	—		0	0	—		—		9	0
Talleres (loan)	2024	AFA Liga Profesional de Fútbol	31	3	—		3	0	7 (Note: Appearances in Copa Libertadores)	0	—		41	3
Talleres (loan)	Total		40	3	—		3	0	7	0	—		50	3
Talleres	2025	AFA Liga Profesional de Fútbol	13	0	—		0	0	4	0	—		17	0
River Plate	2025	AFA Liga Profesional de Fútbol	10	0	—		2	0	2	0	—		14	0
Atlanta United (loan)	2026	MLS	10	0	3	0	—		—		—		13	0
Inter Miami (loan)	2026	MLS	2	0	—		0	0	—		1 (Note: Appearance in Campeones Cup)	0	3	0
Career total			117	8	26	3	9	0	13	0	1	0	166	11

=== International ===
As of match played 2 October 2026

Appearances and goals by national team and year
National team	Year	Apps	Goals
Paraguay	2022	3	0
Paraguay	2023	1	0
Paraguay	2024	1	0
Paraguay	2025	8	2
Paraguay	2026	8	2
Total		21	4

Scores and results list Paraguay's goal tally first.

List of international goals scored by Matías Galarza
No.	Date	Venue	Cap	Opponent	Score	Result	Competition
1	5 June 2025	Estadio Defensores del Chaco, Asunción, Paraguay	8	Uruguay	1–0	2–0	2026 FIFA World Cup qualification
2	9 September 2025	Estadio Nacional, Lima, Peru	10	Peru	1–0	1–0	2026 FIFA World Cup qualification
3	5 June 2026	Estadio Defensores del Chaco, Asunción, Paraguay	15	Nicaragua	3–0	4–0	Friendly
4	19 June 2026	Levi's Stadium, Santa Clara, United States	16	Turkey	1–0	1–0	2026 FIFA World Cup

== Honours ==
Talleres

- Supercopa Internacional: 2023

Inter Miami

- Campeones Cup: 2026
