= Guido Herrera =

Argentine footballer (born 1992)

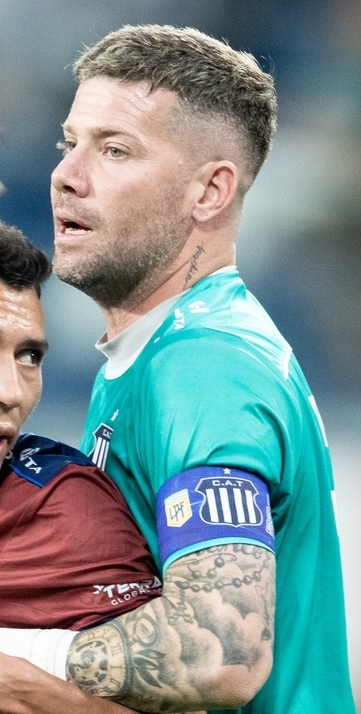
- Herrera playing for Talleres in 2024

Personal information
- Full name: Guido Gabriel Herrera
- Date of birth: 29 February 1992 (age 34)
- Place of birth: Río Cuarto, Argentina
- Height: 1.87 m (6 ft 2 in)
- Position: Goalkeeper

Team information
- Current team: Bahia
- Number: 17

Youth career
- Deportivo Río Cuarto
- Belgrano

Senior career*
Years	Team	Apps	(Gls)
2012–2013	Belgrano	0	(0)
2013–2015	Defensores de Belgrano	45	(0)
2016–2026	Talleres	320	(1)
2020	→ Yeni Malatyaspor (loan)	3	(0)
2026–	Bahia	0	(0)

International career
2009	Argentina U17	0	(0)
2018	Argentina	0	(0)
- * Club domestic league appearances and goals as of 17:39, 11 July 2026 (UTC)

Guido Gabriel Herrera (born 29 February 1992) is an Argentine professional footballer who plays as a goalkeeper for Campeonato Brasileiro Série A club Bahia.

== Club career ==
Herrera first played for Deportivo Río Cuarto at youth level, before joining Belgrano. His senior career got underway with the latter, he was moved into the first-team in 2012 and remained for two seasons but failed to make an appearance. In June 2013, Herrera left Belgrano to play for Defensores de Belgrano of Torneo Argentino A. He made his debut for the club on 24 August 2014 against Alvarado. After fifty-two appearances in all competitions for Defensores de Belgrano over 2014 and 2015, Herrera completed a move to Primera B Nacional side Talleres on 7 January 2016.

He subsequently made his first appearance in professional football on 9 April versus Almagro, in a season which ended with promotion to the Argentine Primera División. In the club's final match of the 2018–19 campaign, Herrera scored for the first time; netting a penalty in a 2–2 draw with Olimpo on 12 May 2018 as Talleres qualified for the 2019 Copa Libertadores. After one hundred and twenty-six games, Herrera headed to Turkey with Yeni Malatyaspor on loan in August 2020. He made his debut on 12 September in a three-goal loss away to Fatih Karagümrük. His loan was terminated on 20 December.

In 2026, Herrera will become a player of Bahia, after 320 matches and 2 titles with Talleres.

== International career ==
Herrera received a call-up to the Argentina national team in October 2018, replacing an injured Franco Armani for friendlies in Saudi Arabia with Iraq and Brazil.

== Career statistics ==
As of 12 November 2026.

Appearances and goals by club, season and competition
Club	Season	League			Cup		League Cup		Continental		Other		Total	
Club	Season	Division	Apps	Goals	Apps	Goals	Apps	Goals	Apps	Goals	Apps	Goals	Apps	Goals
Belgrano	2011–12	Argentine Primera División	0	0	0	0	—		—		—		0	0
Belgrano	2012–13	Argentine Primera División	0	0	0	0	—		—		—		0	0
Belgrano	Total		0	0	0	0	—		—		—		0	0
Defensores de Belgrano	2014	Torneo Federal A	14	0	2	0	—		—		—		16	0
Defensores de Belgrano	2015	Torneo Federal A	31	0	1	0	—		—		4 (Note: Appearance(s) in Torneo Federal A play-offs)	0	36	0
Defensores de Belgrano	Total		45	0	3	0	—		—		4	0	52	0
Talleres	2016	Primera B Nacional	11	0	0	0	—		—		—		11	0
Talleres	2016–17	Argentine Primera División	30	0	1	0	—		—		—		31	0
Talleres	2017–18	Argentine Primera División	27	1	0	0	—		—		—		27	1
Talleres	2018–19	Argentine Primera División	22	0	3	0	4	0	4 (Note: Appearance(s) in the Copa Libertadores)	0	—		33	0
Talleres	2019–20	Argentine Primera División	21	0	2	0	1	0	—		—		24	0
Talleres	2021	Argentine Primera División	31	0	—		—		4 (Note: Appearance(s) in the Copa Sudamericana)	0	—		35	0
Talleres	2022	Argentine Primera División	35	0	1	0	—		10	0	—		46	0
Talleres	2023	Argentine Primera División	41	0	3	0	—		—		—		44	0
Talleres	2024	Argentine Primera División	39	0	2	0	—		8	0	—		49	0
Talleres	2025	Argentine Primera División	32	0	0	0	—		3	0	1 (Note: Appearance(s) in the Supercopa Internacional)	0	36	0
Talleres	2026	Argentine Primera División	17	0	2	0	—		—		—		19	0
Talleres	Total		306	1	14	0	5	0	29	0	1	0	355	1
Yeni Malatyaspor (loan)	2020–21	Süper Lig	3	0	1	0	—		—		—		4	0
Bahia	2026	Série A	0	0	—		—		—		—		0	0
Career total			354	1	18	0	5	0	29	0	4	0	411	1

== Honours ==
Talleres

- Primera B Nacional: 2016
