= Blas Riveros =

Paraguayan footballer (born 1998)

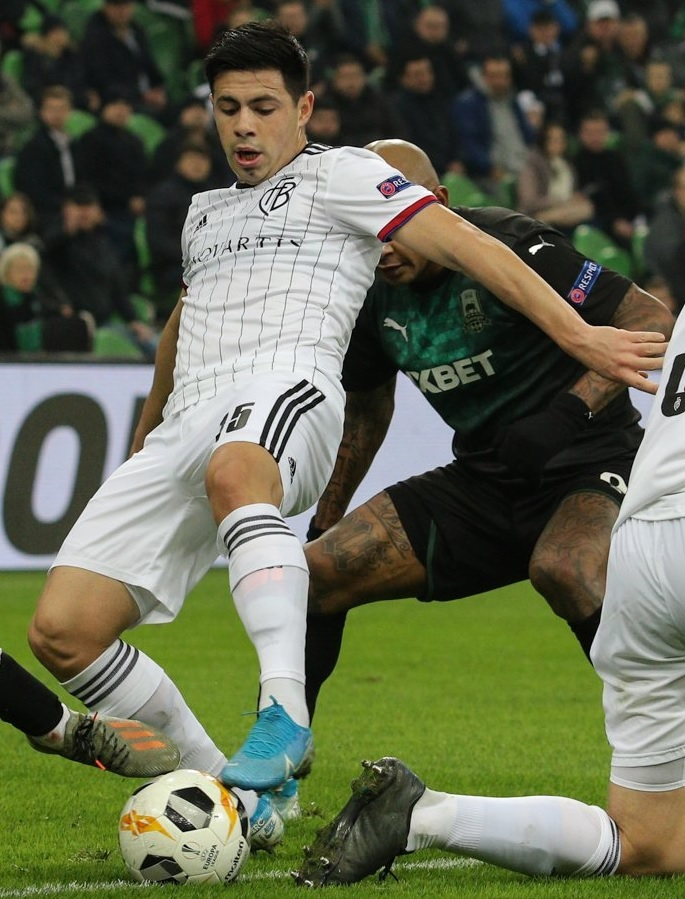
- Riveros playing for Basel in 2019

Personal information
- Full name: Blas Miguel Riveros Galeano
- Date of birth: 3 February 1998 (age 28)
- Place of birth: Itauguá, Paraguay
- Height: 1.77 m (5 ft 10 in)
- Position: Left-back

Team information
- Current team: Cerro Porteño
- Number: 15

Youth career
- –2015: Olimpia

Senior career*
Years	Team	Apps	(Gls)
2015–2016	Olimpia	20	(0)
2016–2020	Basel	71	(3)
2020–2023	Brøndby	49	(1)
2023–2025	Talleres	38	(0)
2025–	Cerro Porteño	36	(2)

International career^{‡}
2015–2016	Paraguay U17	12	(0)
2017	Paraguay U20	4	(0)
2016–	Paraguay	15	(0)
- * Club domestic league appearances and goals as of 10:13, 5 November 2026 (UTC) ‡ National team caps and goals as of 15 November 2025

Blas Miguel Riveros Galeano (born 3 February 1998) is a Paraguayan professional footballer who plays as a left-back for Cerro Porteño and the Paraguay national team.

== Club career ==
=== Olimpia Asunción ===
Riveros started his professional career with Olimpia Asunción in the Primera División Paraguaya after coming through their youth system. He lifted the Primera División title with the club in 2015.

=== Basel ===
On 4 May 2016, FC Basel announced that they had signed Riveros on a five-year deal. Due to Riveros' commitments with the Paraguay national football team in the Copa América, he was not expected to enter into first team training until the beginning of July. He joined Basel's first team for their 2016–17 season under head coach Urs Fischer. After playing in five test games Riveros played his debut for the club in the Swiss Cup away game in the Herti Allmend Stadion on 18 September 2016 as Basel won 1–0 against Zug 94. Riveros made his domestic league debut for his new team on 15 October 2016 in the home game against Luzern. The game ended with a 3–0 victory and Riveros played the full game.

During his first season Riveros had eight appearances in the domestic league, but also played in their U-21 team. In the 2016–17 UEFA Youth League group stage Riveros played in each of the six matches as the Basel U-19 team qualified for the knock-out round. Under trainer Urs Fischer Riveros won the Swiss Super League championship at the end of the 2016–17 Super League season. For the club this was the eighth title in a row and their 20th championship title in total. They also won the Swiss Cup for the twelfth time, which meant they had won the double for the sixth time in the club's history.

Riveros scored his first goal for his club in the home game during the 2017–18 UEFA Champions League group stage on 27 September 2017 in the St. Jakob-Park. It was the last goal of the game as Basel won 5–0 against Benfica. He scored his first domestic league goal for his team on 11 April 2018 in the home game as Basel won 3–0 against Zürich.

Under trainer Marcel Koller Basel won the Swiss Cup in the 2018–19 season. In the first round Basel beat FC Montlingen 3–0, in the second round Echallens Région 7–2 and in the round of 16 Winterthur 1–0. In the quarter-finals Sion were defeated 4–2 after extra time and in the semi-finals Zürich were defeated 3–1. All these games were played away from home. The final was held on 19 May 2019 in the Stade de Suisse Wankdorf Bern against Thun. Striker Albian Ajeti scored the first goal, Fabian Frei the second for Basel, then Dejan Sorgić netted a goal for Thun, but the end result was 2–1 for Basel. Riveros played in three of the cup games.

Riveros appeared regularly in the Basel team in his first four seasons. Nevertheless to begin of his fifth he decided to leave the club and transferred to Brøndby IF. During his time with the club he played a total of 127 games for Basel scoring a total of six goals. 71 of these games were in the Swiss Super League, 11 in the Swiss Cup, 13 in the UEFA competitions (Champions League and Europa League) and 32 were friendly games. He scored three goals in the domestic league, one in the above mentioned Champions League game and the other two were scored during the test games.

=== Brøndby ===
On 5 October 2020, Danish Superliga club Brøndby IF announced the signing of Riveros on a four-year contract. He made his debut for the club on 5 November in a Danish Cup match against Ledøje-Smørum Fodbold, immediately contributing with an assist to the decisive goal by Simon Hedlund in a 1–0 win. In his Danish Superliga debut on 8 November, he scored the opening goal in a 3–1 home win over OB, but suffered a knee injury in the second-half after a collision with Ryan Laursen. Tests later confirmed that he had torn his posterior cruciate ligament and medial collateral ligament, keeping him sidelined for around 12 months.

Riveros made his return to the Brøndby side on 17 October 2021, coming on as a substitute 12 minutes before the end of the match in Brøndby's 3–2 win against Vejle Boldklub. He made an immediate impact, making an assist for the 2–2 goal by Mikael Uhre.

=== Talleres ===
On 1 September 2023, it was announced that Riveros had joined Argentine Primera División club Talleres.

=== Cerro Porteño ===
On 30 July 2025, Riveros returned to Paraguay to join Cerro Porteño.

== International career ==
On 28 May 2016, Riveros made his debut for the Paraguay national team against Mexico and he played the full game. He was named in Paraguay's squad for the Copa América Centenario. He failed to make an appearance, however, as Paraguay were eliminated at the group stages without having recorded a win.

== Career statistics ==
=== Club ===
As of match played 31 August 2025

Appearances and goals by club, season and competition
Club	Season	League			National cup		Continental		Other		Total	
Club	Season	Division	Apps	Goals	Apps	Goals	Apps	Goals	Apps	Goals	Apps	Goals
Olimpia	2015	Paraguayan Primera División	9	0	0	0	0	0	0	0	9	0
Olimpia	2016	Paraguayan Primera División	11	0	0	0	3 (Note: Appearances in Copa Libertadores)	1	0	0	14	1
Olimpia	Total		20	0	0	0	3	1	0	0	23	1
Basel	2016–17	Swiss Super League	8	0	2	0	0	0	—		10	0
Basel	2017–18	Swiss Super League	25	1	2	0	5 (Note: Appearance(s) in UEFA Champions League)	1	—		32	2
Basel	2018–19	Swiss Super League	19	2	3	0	1	0	—		23	2
Basel	2019–20	Swiss Super League	18	0	4	0	7 (Note: One appearance in UEFA Champions League, six appearances in UEFA Europa League)	0	—		29	0
Basel	2020–21	Swiss Super League	1	0	0	0	0	0	—		1	0
Basel	Total		71	3	11	0	13	1	—		95	4
Brøndby	2020–21	Danish Superliga	1	1	1	0	—		—		2	1
Brøndby	2021–22	Danish Superliga	18	0	3	0	4 (Note: Appearances in UEFA Europa League)	0	—		25	0
Brøndby	2022–23	Danish Superliga	25	0	1	0	4 (Note: Appearances in UEFA Europa Conference League)	1	—		30	1
Brøndby	2023–24	Danish Superliga	5	0	—		—		—		5	0
Brøndby	Total		49	1	5	0	8	1	—		62	2
Talleres	2023	Argentine Primera División	5	0	0	0	—		—		5	0
Talleres	2024	Argentine Primera División	16	0	1	0	3	0	—		20	0
Talleres	2025	Argentine Primera División	12	0	1	0	4	0	1 (Note: Appearance in Supercopa Internacional)	0	18	0
Talleres	Total		33	0	2	0	7	0	1	0	43	0
Cerro Porteño	2025	Paraguayan Primera División	10	0	0	0	2	0	—		12	0
Career total			183	4	18	0	33	3	1	0	235	7

=== International ===
As of match played 15 November 2025

Appearances and goals by national team and year
National team	Year	Apps	Goals
Paraguay	2016	1	0
Paraguay	2019	6	0
Paraguay	2020	2	0
Paraguay	2022	3	0
Paraguay	2023	1	0
Paraguay	2024	1	0
Paraguay	2025	1	0
Total		15	0

== Honours ==
Olimpia

- Primera División: 2015 Clausura

Basel

- Swiss Super League: 2016–17
- Swiss Cup: 2016–17, 2018–19

Brøndby

- Danish Superliga: 2020–21

Individual

- Superliga Team of the Month: July 2023
