= Gastón Benavídez =

Argentine professional footballer

Personal information
- Full name: Gastón Américo Benavídez
- Date of birth: 23 October 1995 (age 31)
- Place of birth: Morteros, Argentina
- Height: 1.75 m (5 ft 9 in)
- Position: Right-back

Team information
- Current team: Athletico Paranaense
- Number: 29

Senior career*
Years	Team	Apps	(Gls)
2013–2016	Tiro Federal Morteros	72	(0)
2017–2022	Estudiantes RC	74	(1)
2021	→ Arsenal de Sarandí (loan)	21	(0)
2022	→ Talleres (loan)	26	(0)
2023–2025	Talleres	90	(6)
2025	→ Athletico Paranaense (loan)	19	(1)
2026–	Athletico Paranaense	25	(1)
- * Club domestic league appearances and goals as of 18:34, 10 November 2026 (UTC)

Gastón Américo Benavídez (born 23 October 1995) is an Argentine professional footballer who plays as a right-back for Campeonato Brasileiro Série B club Athletico Paranaense.

== Career ==
Benavídez started his senior career with hometown club Tiro Federal. He remained with the fourth tier outfit between 2013 and 2016, making a total of seventy-two appearances for them. 2017 saw Benavídez head to Río Cuarto with Estudiantes of Torneo Federal A; tier three. He debuted in a goalless draw at home to Unión Villa Krause on 8 October, before scoring his first senior league goal in a 4–2 victory over Juventud Unida Universitario on 12 March 2018. After appearing twenty times in all competitions in 2017–18, Benavídez featured in twenty-eight matches in 2018–19 as they won promotion as champions.

After thirty Primera B Nacional appearances for Estudiantes, Benavídez departed on 9 February 2021 to Primera División side Arsenal de Sarandí; amid interest from Talleres. He made his debut on 13 February at the Estadio Pedro Bidegain away to San Lorenzo, having replaced Julián Navas with thirteen minutes left of an eventual 2–1 loss.

On 31 January 2022, Benavídez was loaned out to Talleres for one year, with a purchase option.

== Career statistics ==
As of 14 February 2021.

Appearances and goals by club, season and competition
Club	Season	League			Cup		Continental		State league		Other		Total	
Club	Season	Division	Apps	Goals	Apps	Goals	Apps	Goals	Apps	Goals	Apps	Goals	Apps	Goals
Estudiantes de Río Cuarto	2017–18	Torneo Federal A	19	1	1	0	—		—		—		20	1
Estudiantes de Río Cuarto	2018–19	Torneo Federal A	25	0	3	0	—		—		—		28	0
Estudiantes de Río Cuarto	2019–20	Primera B Nacional	20	0	0	0	—		—		—		20	0
Estudiantes de Río Cuarto	2020	Primera B Nacional	10	0	0	0	—		—		—		10	0
Estudiantes de Río Cuarto	Total		74	1	4	0	—		—		—		78	1
Arsenal de Sarandí (loan)	2021 (Note: Soccerway counts Copa de la Liga Profesional appearances as league appearances.)	Primera División	21	0	0	0	8 (Note: Appearance(s) in Copa Sudamericana)	0	—		—		21	0
Talleres	2022	Primera División	26	0	6	0	10 (Note: Appearance(s) in Copa Libertadores)	0	—		—		42	0
Talleres	2023	Primera División	40	1	4	2	—		—		—		44	3
Talleres	2024	Primera División	39	3	3	0	7	0	—		—		49	3
Talleres	2025	Primera División	11	2	0	0	4	0	—		1 (Note: Appearance(s) in Supercopa Internacional)	0	16	2
Talleres	Total		116	6	13	2	21	0	—		1	0	151	8
Athletico Paranaense	2025	Série B	19	1	4	0	—		—		—		23	1
Athletico Paranaense	2026	Série A	24	1	4	0	—		1 (Note: Appearance(s) in Campeonato Paranaense)	0	—		29	1
Athletico Paranaense	Total		43	2	8	0	—		1	0	—		52	2
Career total			254	9	25	2	21	0	1	0	1	0	302	11

== Honours ==
Estudiantes RC

- Torneo Federal A: 2018–19
