= Alastra =

Alastra is an Italian surname. Notable people with the surname include:

- Fabrizio Alastra (born 1997), Italian footballer
- Ignacio Alastra (born 2007), Argentine footballer
- Milagros Alastra (born 2006), Argentine field hockey player
- Rodrigo Antonio Isgró Alastra (born 1999), Argentine rugby union player
