= Daniel Willington =

Argentine footballer (1942–2025)

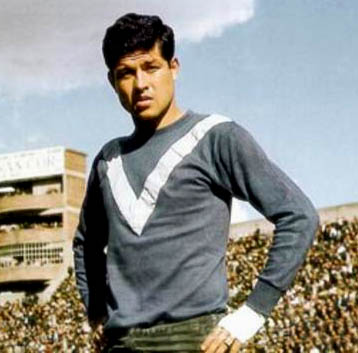
- Willington with Vélez Sársfield in 1968

Personal information
- Full name: Daniel Alberto Willington
- Date of birth: 1 September 1942
- Place of birth: Santa Fe, Argentina
- Date of death: 3 November 2025 (aged 83)
- Place of death: Córdoba, Argentina
- Position: Forward

Senior career*
Years	Team	Apps	(Gls)
1959–1961	Talleres de Córdoba		
1962–1970	Vélez Sársfield		
1971	Veracruz		
1972	Huracán		
1973	Instituto de Córdoba		
1974–1976	Talleres de Córdoba		
1978	Vélez Sársfield		

International career
1962–1970	Argentina	11	(1)

Managerial career
- 1982–1983: Talleres de Córdoba
- 1987–1989: Vélez Sársfield
- 1990: Talleres de Córdoba
- 1994: Talleres de Córdoba
- 2005: Talleres de Córdoba
- * Club domestic league appearances and goals

Daniel Alberto Willington (1 September 1942 – 3 November 2025) was an Argentine footballer who played as a forward, spending most of his career for Talleres de Córdoba, Vélez Sársfield and also playing for the Argentina national team. He was described by Pelé as "the best player in the world" after a friendly match between Vélez and Santos FC in 1969.

== Club career ==
Willington was born in Santa Fe but spent his childhood in Córdoba; he started his playing career in the late 1950s with local club Talleres de Córdoba.

In 1962, he joined Vélez Sársfield where he became a regular member of the first team. In 1968, he was part of the team that won Nacional 1968, the first league title obtained by the club.

After leaving Vélez, Willington played for Huracán and Instituto de Córdoba before returning to Talleres de Córdoba in 1974.

Willington also had a spell playing for Veracruz during the 1970–71 Primera División de México season.

== Managerial career ==
Willington was manager of Talleres when the team won the Primera B Nacional's Torneo Reducido in 1993–94.

== Personal life and death ==
Daniel Willington was married to Ana and he had four children from his first marriage with Olga. Their names are: Mónica, Walter, Javier, and Esteban. Willington died on 3 November 2025, at the age of 83.

== Honours ==
=== Player ===
Talleres de Córdoba

- Liga Cordobesa de Fútbol: 1960 Preparación, 1960 Competencia, 1960 Clausura, 1960 Oficial, 1974 Zonal, 1974 Oficial, 1975 Apertura, 1975 Clausura, 1975 Oficial, 1976 Apertura, 1976 Clausura, 1976 Oficial, 1977 Clausura, 1977 Oficial, 1978 Clausura, 1978 Oficial
- Copa Hermandad: 1977

Vélez Sársfield

- Primera División: Nacional 1968

Argentina

- Taça das Nações: 1964

=== Manager ===
Talleres de Córdoba

- Primera B Nacional: 1993–94 Torneo Reducido
