= Federico Girotti =

Argentine footballer (born 1999)

Personal information
- Full name: Federico Girotti Bonazza
- Date of birth: 2 June 1999 (age 27)
- Place of birth: Acassuso, Argentina
- Height: 1.90 m (6 ft 3 in)
- Position: Forward

Team information
- Current team: Alianza Lima
- Number: 99

Youth career
- Escuela Daniel Messina
- 2010–2018: River Plate

Senior career*
Years	Team	Apps	(Gls)
2018–2022	River Plate	33	(4)
2022–2026	Talleres	93	(14)
2023	→ San Lorenzo (loan)	13	(1)
2026–	Alianza Lima	4	(0)
- * Club domestic league appearances and goals as of 18:42, 17 March 2026 (UTC)

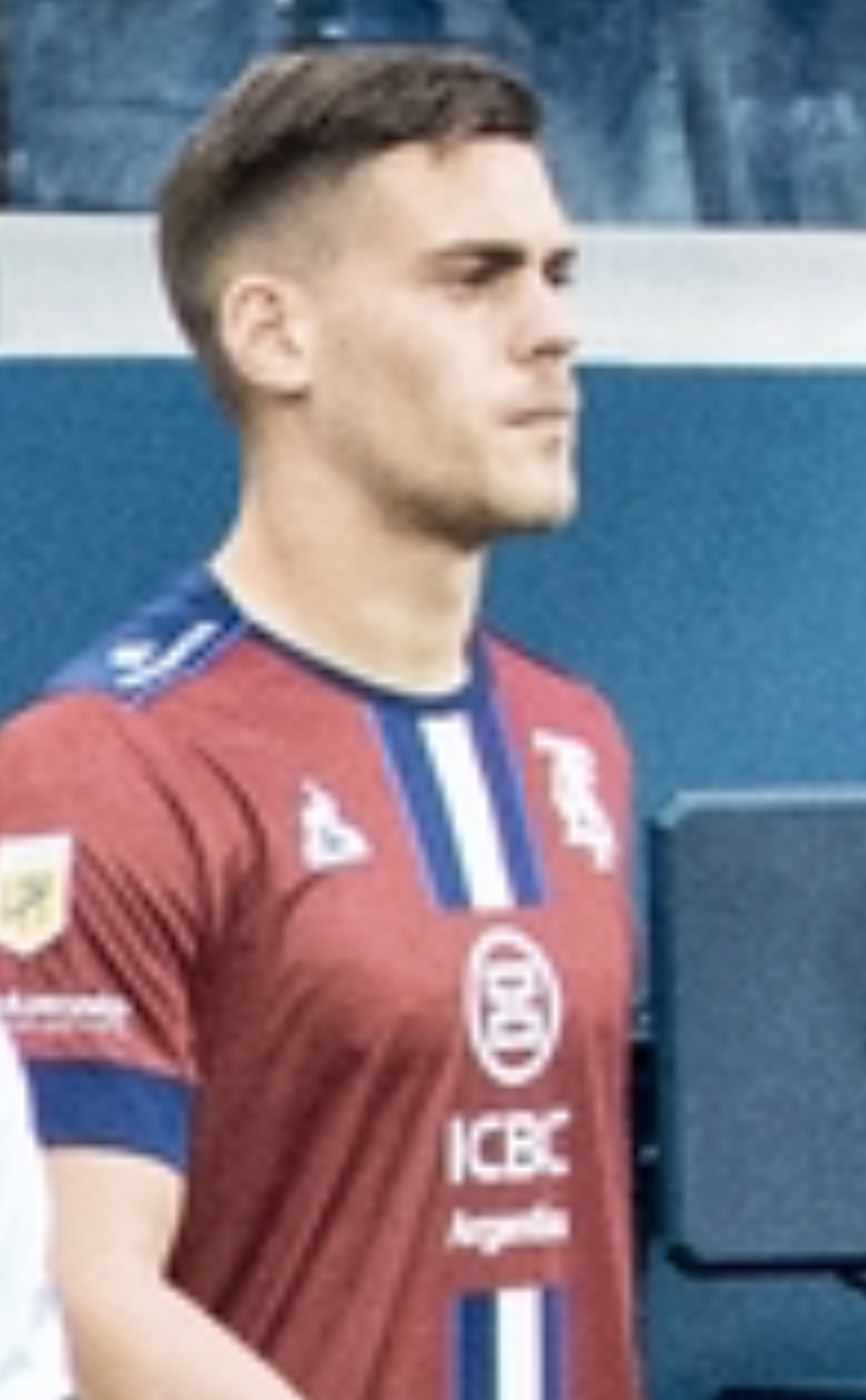
Federico Girotti

Federico Girotti Bonazza (born 2 June 1999) is an Argentine professional footballer who plays as a forward for Alianza Lima.

== Career ==
Girotti joined the youth system of River Plate in 2010, signing from Escuela Daniel Messina. His first involvement with the club's first-team came during 2018–19, with the forward being an unused substitute for a Primera División fixture against Gimnasia y Esgrima on 2 December 2018. Girotti's professional bow arrived in January 2019 in a 1–3 home loss to Patronato, he was subbed on for the final twenty-six minutes for Lucas Beltrán. He scored his first senior goal in his next league appearance, almost two years later in a Copa de la Liga Profesional win away to Godoy Cruz on 14 November 2020.

On 6 February 2022, Girotti joined Talleres de Córdoba on a deal until the end of 2025.

== Career statistics ==
As of 8 March 2021.

Club statistics
Club	Season	League			Cup		League Cup		Continental		Other		Total	
Club	Season	Division	Apps	Goals	Apps	Goals	Apps	Goals	Apps	Goals	Apps	Goals	Apps	Goals
River Plate	2018–19	Primera División	1	0	0	0	0	0	0	0	0	0	1	0
River Plate	2019–20	Primera División	0	0	0	0	0	0	1 (Note: Appearance(s) in the Copa Libertadores)	0	0	0	1	0
River Plate	2020–21 (Note: Soccerway counts 2020 Copa de la Liga Profesional appearances as league appearances.)	Primera División	6	2	0	0	0	0	3	0	0	0	9	2
River Plate	2021 (Note: Soccerway counts 2021 Copa de la Liga Profesional appearances as league appearances.)	Primera División	2	0	1	1	—		0	0	1 (Note: Appearance(s) in the Supercopa Argentina)	0	4	1
Career total			9	2	1	1	0	0	4	0	1	0	15	3

== Honours ==
River Plate

- Copa Libertadores: 2018
- Recopa Sudamericana: 2019
- Supercopa Argentina: 2019
- Copa Argentina: 2019
- Trofeo de Campeones: 2021
- Primera División: 2021
