= Ignacio Alastra =

Argentine footballer (born 2007)

Personal information
- Full name: Ignacio Alastra
- Date of birth: 29 October 2007 (age 19)
- Place of birth: Luján de Cuyo, Argentina
- Height: 1.75 m (5 ft 9 in)
- Position: Forward

Team information
- Current team: Talleres
- Number: 24

Youth career
- Talleres

Senior career*
| Years | Team | Apps | (Gls) |
| 2025– | Talleres | 2 | (0) |
- * Club domestic league appearances and goals as of 12 August 2026

Ignacio Alastra (born 29 October 2007) is an Argentine professional footballer who plays as a forward for Talleres.

== Club career ==
Born in Luján de Cuyo, Mendoza Province, Alastra is a youth product of CA Talleres.

In April 2025, he signed his first professional contract with Talleres.

Alastra made his professional debut with Talleres in a 0–0 Argentine Primera División draw against Newell's Old Boys on 18 August 2025. He came on as a 73rd-minute substitute for Rick.

== Personal life ==
Alastra is the son of former Argentine professional footballer Guillermo Alastra who had spells at Deportivo Guaymallén, Gimnasia y Esgrima de Mendoza, Independiente Rivadavia, and San Martín de Mendoza.
