= Santiago Fernández (footballer, born 2005) =

Argentine footballer (born 2005)

Personal information
- Full name: Santiago Abel Fernández
- Date of birth: 3 March 2005 (age 21)
- Place of birth: Río Cuarto, Argentina
- Height: 1.81 m (5 ft 11 in)
- Position: Centre-back

Team information
- Current team: Talleres
- Number: 44

Youth career
- Club Banda Norte
- 2020–2025: Talleres

Senior career*
Years	Team	Apps	(Gls)
2025–	Talleres	36	(1)

International career^{‡}
2025–	Argentina U20	1	(0)
Medal record
Men's football
Representing Argentina
FIFA U-20 World Cup
Runner-up	2025 Chile
- * Club domestic league appearances and goals as of 17:47, 15 November 2026 (UTC) ‡ National team caps and goals as of 14:02, 19 September 2025 (UTC)

Santiago Abel Fernández (born 3 March 2005) is an Argentine professional footballer who plays as a centre-back for Argentine Primera División club Talleres.

== Club career ==
A youth product of Club Banda Norte, Fernández joined the academy of Talleres in 2020 where he finished his development. On 21 January 2025, he signed his first professional contract with Talleres until 2029. He made his senior debut with Talleres in a 1–1 Atlético Tucumán in the Argentine Primera División on 17 February 2025.

== International career ==
In May 2025, he was first called up to the Argentina U20s for a set of friendlies. He made the final Argentina U20s squad for the 2025 FIFA U-20 World Cup.
