= Juan Portilla =

Colombian footballer

Personal information
- Full name: Juan Camilo Portilla Orozco
- Date of birth: 12 September 1998 (age 28)
- Place of birth: Cali, Colombia
- Height: 1.83 m (6 ft 0 in)
- Position: Midfielder

Team information
- Current team: Athletico Paranaense
- Number: 27

Youth career
- Boca Juniors de Cali

Senior career*
Years	Team	Apps	(Gls)
2016–2018	Universitario Popayán	32	(0)
2018	Jacksonville Armada	9	(0)
2018	Deportes Melipilla	4	(0)
2019–2023	Alianza Petrolera	55	(1)
2022	→ América de Cali (loan)	38	(0)
2023–2024	América de Cali	39	(1)
2024–2026	Talleres	62	(1)
2026–	Athletico Paranaense	26	(0)

International career^{‡}
- Colombia U15
2024–	Colombia	10	(0)
- * Club domestic league appearances and goals as of 18:17, 10 November 2026 (UTC) ‡ National team caps and goals as of 7 June 2026

Juan Camilo Portilla Orozco (born 12 September 1998) is a Colombian professional footballer who plays as a midfielder for Campeonato Brasileiro Série A club Athletico Paranaense and the Colombia national team.

After beginning his career in Colombia with youth sides including Boca Juniors de Cali and breaking into senior football with Universitario Popayán, he had stints abroad at Jacksonville Armada in the United States and Deportes Melipilla in Chile, before returning to Colombia with Alianza Petrolera. In 2022, he joined América de Cali on loan and later made the move permanent in 2023. In 2024, he signed for Argentine club Talleres.

Portilla was first called up to the Colombia national team in 2023 and made his senior debut in 2024 during a World Cup qualifier against Argentina.

== Club career ==
Portilla began his career with Boca Juniors de Cali at youth level, then the youth ranks of Universitario Popayán. In 2016, he made his professional debut with Universitario Popayán in the Categoría Primera B.

In 2018, Portilla emigrated to the United States and joined Jacksonville Armada. In the second half of the same year, he moved to Chile and played for Deportes Melipilla.

Back to Colombia, Portilla played for Alianza Petrolera and América de Cali in the top level.

In 2024, Portilla signed with Argentine club Talleres de Córdoba.

== International career ==
At youth level, Portilla represented the Colombia under-15 national team.

Portilla received his first call up to the Colombia senior team for the friendly match against the United States on 18 January 2023. He made his debut in the 2026 FIFA World Cup qualification match against Argentina on 10 September 2024.

== Career statistics ==
=== International ===
As of match played 7 June 2026

Appearances and goals by national team and year
National team	Year	Apps	Goals
Colombia	2024	3	0
Colombia	2025	5	0
Colombia	2026	2	0
Total		10	0
