= Franco Moyano =

Argentine footballer

Personal information
- Full name: Franco David Moyano
- Date of birth: 13 September 1997 (age 29)
- Place of birth: Lobos, Argentina
- Height: 1.71 m (5 ft 7 1/2 in)
- Position: Midfielder

Team information
- Current team: Instituto (on loan from Talleres)
- Number: 5

Youth career
- Lobos
- San Lorenzo

Senior career*
Years	Team	Apps	(Gls)
2017–2020	San Lorenzo	19	(0)
2019–2021	→ Argentinos Jrs. (loan)	63	(1)
2021–2024	Argentinos Juniors	74	(1)
2024–	Talleres	6	(0)
2025	→ Puebla (loan)	23	(0)
2026–	→ Instituto (loan)	3	(0)

International career
2017	Argentina U20	1	(0)
- * Club domestic league appearances and goals as of 18:00, 10 May 2026 (UTC)

Franco David Moyano (born 13 September 1997) is an Argentine professional footballer who plays as a midfielder for Instituto, on loan from Talleres.

== Career ==
=== Club ===
Moyano had youth spells with Lobos and San Lorenzo. He started off his senior career with San Lorenzo, first appearing in their squad in 2017 when he was an unused substitute for an Argentine Primera División match with Rosario Central on 10 September. He eventually made his professional debut in January 2018 during a 2–0 loss away to Talleres. On 28 January 2019, Moyano was loaned to Argentinos Juniors for one year, with a purchase option. On 2 January 2020, the loan spell was extended for another six months. In July 2020, the loan spell was extended once again, however, this time with a purchase obligation of $350,000 for 80% of his rights. He became a permanently Argentinos player from 1 January 2022, signing a one-year deal with the club.

In July 2024, he joined Talleres, signing a four-year deal.

=== International ===
In 2017, Moyano was called up to the Argentina U20 squad for the 2017 South American Youth Football Championship in Ecuador. He won one cap at the tournament, versus Venezuela on 27 January.

== Career statistics ==
As of 29 January 2019.

Club statistics
Club	Season	League			Cup		Continental		Other		Total	
Club	Season	Division	Apps	Goals	Apps	Goals	Apps	Goals	Apps	Goals	Apps	Goals
San Lorenzo	2017–18	Primera División	11	0	0	0	1 (Note: Appearance(s) in the Copa Sudamericana)	0	0	0	12	0
San Lorenzo	2018–19	Primera División	8	0	1	0	2	0	0	0	11	0
San Lorenzo	Total		19	0	1	0	3	0	0	0	23	0
Argentinos Juniors (loan)	2018–19	Primera División	0	0	0	0	0	0	0	0	0	0
Career total			19	0	1	0	3	0	0	0	23	0
