= Gabriel Báez =

Argentine footballer

Personal information
- Full name: Gabriel Alejandro Báez Corradi
- Date of birth: 21 July 1995 (age 31)
- Place of birth: Buenos Aires, Argentina
- Height: 1.78 m (5 ft 10 in)
- Position: Left back

Team information
- Current team: Talleres
- Number: 23

Youth career
- Agricultores Club

Senior career*
Years	Team	Apps	(Gls)
2015–2019	Newell's Old Boys	16	(0)
2017–2019	→ Venados (loan)	61	(3)
2020–2021	Cerro Largo	14	(1)
2021–2022	Sol de América	34	(0)
2022–2023	Cerro Porteño	45	(1)
2023–2025	Nacional	62	(6)
2025–	Talleres	30	(0)
- * Club domestic league appearances and goals as of 17:44, 15 November 2026 (UTC)

Gabriel Alejandro Báez Corradi (born 21 July 1995) is an Argentine professional footballer who plays as a left back for Talleres.

In 2015, he made his professional debut with Newell's Old Boys at the age of 19. He was subsequently loaned out to Mexican club Venados in 2017.

== Honour ==
Nacional

- Torneo Intermedio: 2024
