= Alexander Medina =

Uruguayan footballer and manager (born 1978)

Personal information
- Full name: Alexander Jesús Medina Reobasco
- Date of birth: 8 August 1978 (age 48)
- Place of birth: Salto, Uruguay
- Height: 1.79 m (5 ft 10 in)
- Position: Striker

Team information
- Current team: Estudiantes (head coach)

Senior career*
| Years | Team | Apps | (Gls) |
| 1995–1996 | Ferrocarril de Salto | | |
| 1996–1998 | Fritsa de Tacuarembó | | |
| 1998–1999 | Huracán Buceo | 7 | (0) |
| 2000–2001 | Central Español | 27 | (7) |
| 2002–2003 | Liverpool Montevideo | 31 | (22) |
| 2004–2005 | Nacional | 63 | (46) |
| 2005–2007 | Cádiz | 47 | (6) |
| 2007–2008 | Racing Ferrol | 30 | (2) |
| 2008–2009 | Nacional | 20 | (6) |
| 2009 | Arsenal de Sarandí | 13 | (0) |
| 2010 | Unión Española | 22 | (5) |
| 2011 | River Plate Montevideo | 8 | (4) |
| 2011–2014 | Nacional | 37 | (13) |
| 2014–2015 | Fenix | 37 | (3) |

International career
| 2006 | Uruguay | 1 | (0) |

Managerial career
- 2016–2017: Nacional (youth)
- 2018: Nacional
- 2019–2021: Talleres
- 2022: Internacional
- 2022–2023: Vélez Sarsfield
- 2023–2024: Granada
- 2024–2025: Talleres
- 2026–: Estudiantes
- * Club domestic league appearances and goals

Alexander Jesús Medina Reobasco (born 8 August 1978) is a Uruguayan football manager and former player who played as a striker, currently manager of Primera División club Estudiantes.

Medina is often nicknamed Cacique (Chief) due to his command on the field during his playing career.

== Playing career ==
=== Club ===
Born in Salto, Medina began his career with local side Ferrocarril de Salto. After representing Fritsa de Tacuarembó, he made his professional debut with Huracán Buceo in 1998.

Medina subsequently represented Central Español and Liverpool Montevideo, finishing the 2003 season as the top scorer. He moved to Nacional for the 2004 season, and was again the league's top scorer with 26 goals.

In August 2005, Medina moved abroad and joined La Liga side Cádiz. He featured sparingly in his first season, as his side suffered relegation, and appeared more regularly in his second, as the club narrowly missed out promotion.

On 31 August 2007, Medina signed for Racing Ferrol also in the Spanish second tier. A first-choice, he only scored three goals as the Galicians suffered relegation.

Medina returned to his home country and Nacional in June 2008, but left the club in August of the following year to sign for Arsenal de Sarandí. He switched teams and countries again in January 2010, after agreeing to a deal with Unión Española, but returned to his home country for the 2011 with River Plate Montevideo.

In 2011, Medina returned to Nacional for a third spell. Initially a starter, he fell down the pecking order during the 2013 season, and moved to Fenix in August 2014. He retired in the following year, aged 37.

=== International ===
Medina made his full international debut for Uruguay on 1 March 2006, coming on as a late substitute for Diego Forlán in a 1–2 friendly match against England.

== Managerial career ==
=== Nacional ===
In July 2016, Medina returned to his former club Nacional as the manager of the youth setup. On 12 December of the following year, he was named manager of the first team in the place of Martín Lasarte.

Medina led Nacional to the Championship play-off in his first season, but lost to eventual champions Peñarol. On 7 December 2018, he resigned.

=== Talleres ===
On 6 June 2019, Medina replaced departing Juan Pablo Vojvoda at the helm of Talleres in the Argentine top tier. In his first season, he qualified the club to the Copa Sudamericana, and led the side to an impressive third-place finish in the 2021 campaign; he also reached the Final of the 2019–20 Copa Argentina, but lost on penalties to Boca Juniors.

On 23 December 2021, Medina left Talleres as his contract was due to expire.

=== Internacional ===
On 27 December 2021, Medina was appointed manager of Campeonato Brasileiro Série A side Internacional on a one-year contract. He was sacked the following 15 April, after a 1–1 draw with Paraguayan side Guaireña.

=== Vélez Sarsfield ===
On 24 May 2022, Medina agreed to become the manager of Vélez Sarsfield, returning to Argentina after nearly six months. He left the club by mutual agreement on the following 26 February.

=== Granada ===
On 27 November 2023, Medina replaced Paco López at the helm of La Liga side Granada. He was dismissed on 19 March 2024, after winning one of his 14 games in charge.

== Managerial statistics ==
As of 26 October 2026

Managerial record by team and tenure
| Team | Nat. | From | To | Record | | | | | | | | Ref |
| Team | Nat. | From | To | G | W | D | L | GF | GA | GD | Win % | Ref |
|---|---|---|---|---|---|---|---|---|---|---|---|---|
| Nacional | (Uruguay) | 12 December 2017 | 7 December 2018 | 54 | 32 | 12 | 10 | 86 | 47 | +39 | 59.26 | |
| Talleres | (Argentina) | 6 June 2019 | 23 December 2021 | 88 | 39 | 26 | 23 | 123 | 94 | +29 | 44.32 | |
| Internacional | (Brazil) | 27 December 2021 | 15 April 2022 | 17 | 6 | 6 | 5 | 17 | 20 | −3 | 35.29 | |
| Vélez Sarsfield | (Argentina) | 24 May 2022 | 26 February 2023 | 40 | 11 | 13 | 16 | 42 | 48 | −6 | 27.50 | |
| Granada | (Spain) | 27 November 2023 | 19 March 2024 | 14 | 1 | 4 | 9 | 11 | 25 | −14 | 7.14 | |
| Talleres | (Argentina) | 1 September 2024 | 3 April 2025 | 29 | 8 | 13 | 8 | 26 | 27 | −1 | 27.59 | |
| Estudiantes | (Argentina) | 23 February 2026 | present | 41 | 16 | 10 | 15 | 50 | 36 | +14 | 39.02 | |
| Career total | | | | 283 | 113 | 84 | 86 | 355 | 297 | +58 | 39.93 | — |

== Honours ==
=== Player ===
Nacional

- Uruguayan Primera División: 2005, 2008–09, 2011–12

=== Manager ===
Talleres

- Supercopa Internacional: 2023

Estudiantes

- Supercopa Argentina: 2025
