= Cristian Tarragona =

Argentine footballer

Personal information
- Full name: Cristian Tarragona
- Date of birth: 9 April 1991 (age 35)
- Place of birth: Santa Fe, Argentina
- Height: 1.76 m (5 ft 9 in)
- Position: Forward

Team information
- Current team: Unión
- Number: 25

Youth career
- 2012–2013: Alvear
- 2013–2014: Colegiales

Senior career*
Years	Team	Apps	(Gls)
2014	Santamarina	2	(0)
2015	Tiro Federal	18	(4)
2015	Juventud Unida	16	(11)
2016–2017	Temperley	9	(0)
2016–2017	→ Independiente Rivadavia (loan)	36	(13)
2017–2018	Atlante	20	(4)
2018–2019	Platense	25	(9)
2019–2020	Patronato	23	(9)
2019–2021	Vélez Sarsfield	51	(8)
2022–2023	Gimnasia LP	51	(19)
2024	San Lorenzo	18	(2)
2024–2025	Talleres	31	(4)
2025–	Unión	50	(22)
- * Club domestic league appearances and goals as of 17:33, 22 November 2026 (UTC)

Cristian Alberto Tarragona (born 9 April 1991) is an Argentine footballer who plays as a forward for Unión.
