= Ulises Ortegoza =

Chilean footballer (born 1997)

Personal information
- Full name: Diego Ulises Ortegoza
- Date of birth: 19 April 1997 (age 29)
- Place of birth: San Nicolás de los Arroyos, Argentina
- Height: 1.80 m (5 ft 11 in)
- Position: Midfielder

Team information
- Current team: Racing Club
- Number: 16

Senior career*
Years	Team	Apps	(Gls)
2017–2018	Argentino Oeste	–	(–)
2018	General Rojo UD	–	(–)
2018–2022	Los Andes	45	(7)
2022	Gimnasia de Mendoza	16	(6)
2022–2026	Talleres	120	(4)
2026–	Racing Club	14	(1)

International career^{‡}
2024	Chile	1	(0)
- * Club domestic league appearances and goals as of 18:06, 8 November 2026 (UTC) ‡ National team caps and goals as of 13:34, 7 November 2026 (UTC)

Diego Ulises Ortegoza (born 19 April 1997) is a professional footballer who plays as a midfielder for Racing Club. Born in Argentina, he played for the Chile national team.

== Club career ==
Not having was with any club at youth level, Ortegoza played for Argentino Oeste and General Rojo Unión Deportiva in the San Nicolás league before joining Los Andes in 2018, aged 21. Having first played for the reserve team, he made his professional debut in 2019 and spent three seasons with the first team until 2021 in both the Primera Nacional and the Primera B Metropolitana.

In 2022, Ortegoza switched to Gimnasia de Mendoza in the Primera Nacional. The next season, he joined Talleres de Córdoba in the Argentine top level.

On 29 June 2026, Ortegoza signed with Racing Club on a deal until December 2029.

== International career ==
A naturalized Chilean, Ortegoza was included in the Chile preliminary squad for the 2024 Copa América. He received his first call-up for the 2026 FIFA World Cup qualification matches against Brazil and Colombia in October 2024. He made his debut in the second match by replacing Erick Pulgar at minute 84.

== Personal life ==
Ortegoza holds dual Argentine-Chilean nationality due to his Chilean heritage from his paternal grandmother.

== Career statistics ==
=== International ===
As of match played 15 October 2024

Appearances and goals by national team and year
National team	Year	Apps	Goals
Chile	2024	1	0
Total		1	0
