= Joaquín Mosqueira =

Argentine association football player (born 2004)

Personal information
- Full name: Joaquín Elias Mosqueira
- Date of birth: 11 January 2004 (age 22)
- Place of birth: Rosario
- Position: Midfielder

Team information
- Current team: Unión Santa Fe (on loan from Talleres de Córdoba)
- Number: 17

Youth career
- –2019: Newell's Old Boys
- 2019: Coronel Arnold
- 2020: Atlético Pujato
- 2021: Club Renato Cesarini
- 2022-2023: Unión

Senior career*
Years	Team	Apps	(Gls)
2023–2025	Unión	59	(4)
2025–	Talleres	20	(0)
2026	→ Tigre (loan)	6	(0)
2026–	→ Unión Santa Fe (loan)	12	(1)
- * Club domestic league appearances and goals as of 17:28, 22 November 2026 (UTC)

Joaquín Elias Mosqueira (born 11 January 2004) is an Argentine professional footballer who plays as a midfielder for Argentine Primera Division club Unión Santa Fe, on loan from Talleres de Córdoba.

== Career ==
From Rosario, he was a youth player at Newell's Old Boys. In 2019 he went to Coronel Arnold, and then trained with Atlético Pujato, and Club Renato Cesarini, before he joined Unión de Santa Fe in 2022. He played for their reserve team prior to making his debut for the first-team in 2023. That year, he signed a professional contract with the club taking him to 2025 with the club. His form in the Argentine Primera División for Unión, led him to being labelled a "revelation". He later signed a one-year contract extension and had made 59 appearances and scored four goals for the club in two seasons by December 2024.

He joined Talleres in January 2025 agreeing a four-year contract.
