= Augusto Schott =

Argentine footballer

Personal information
- Date of birth: 17 January 2000 (age 26)
- Place of birth: Arroyito, Argentina
- Height: 1.75 m (5 ft 9 in)
- Position: Right-back

Team information
- Current team: Talleres
- Number: 20

Youth career
- Centro Vecinal San Miguel
- Cultural Arroyito
- 2014–2020: Talleres

Senior career*
Years	Team	Apps	(Gls)
2020–	Talleres	70	(7)
2021–2022	→ Platense (loan)	34	(3)
2022–2023	→ Colón (loan)	20	(0)
2023–2024	→ Newell's Old Boys (loan)	23	(0)

International career
2018	Argentina U19		
- * Club domestic league appearances and goals as of 17:44, 15 November 2026 (UTC)

Augusto Schott (born 17 January 2000) is an Argentine professional footballer who plays as a right-back for Talleres.

== Club career ==
Schott had youth stints with Centro Vecinal San Miguel and Cultural Arroyito before joining the ranks of Talleres in 2014; appearing for the latter at the 2018 U-20 Copa Libertadores in Uruguay. After featuring in friendlies which saw him score against Huracán and Godoy Cruz, the player was promoted into Talleres' competitive first-team for a Copa de la Liga Profesional match with Newell's Old Boys on 30 October 2020. He was named on the substitutes' bench, though would replace Nahuel Tenaglia with nine minutes remaining of a 3–1 victory.

== International career ==
Schott represented Argentina's U19s at the 2018 South American Games in Bolivia. He also received training summons from the U20s.

== Career statistics ==
As of 31 October 2020

Appearances and goals by club, season and competition
Club	Season	League			National cup		League cup		Continental		Other		Total	
Club	Season	Division	Apps	Goals	Apps	Goals	Apps	Goals	Apps	Goals	Apps	Goals	Apps	Goals
Talleres	2020–21 (Note: Soccerway counts Copa de la Liga Profesional appearances as league appearances.)	Primera División	1	0	0	0	0	0	—		0	0	1	0
Career total			1	0	0	0	0	0	—		0	0	1	0
