= Juan Rodríguez (Argentine footballer) =

Argentine footballer

Personal information
- Full name: Juan Gabriel Rodríguez
- Date of birth: 28 February 1994 (age 32)
- Place of birth: General Alvear, Argentina
- Height: 1.88 m (6 ft 2 in)
- Position: Centre-back

Team information
- Current team: Atlético Tucumán
- Number: 17

Youth career
- 2001–2009: Club El Recreo
- 2009–2016: River Plate

Senior career*
Years	Team	Apps	(Gls)
2016–2019	Fénix	49	(0)
2017–2018	→ Almagro (loan)	19	(1)
2018–2019	→ San Martín SJ (loan)	10	(0)
2019–2023	Defensa y Justicia	45	(0)
2022	→ Rosario Central (loan)	11	(0)
2023–2026	Talleres	62	(5)
2026–	Atlético Tucumán	1	(2)
- * Club domestic league appearances and goals as of 17:43, 9 November 2026 (UTC)

Juan Gabriel Rodríguez (born 28 February 1994) is an Argentine professional footballer who plays as a centre-back for Atlético Tucumán.

== Career ==
=== Club ===
Rodríguez began in Club El Recreo's youth, prior to joining River Plate. He departed in 2016 to join Primera B Metropolitana's Fénix, making his pro debut in a 5–1 home win over UAI Urquiza on 8 February. That was the first of forty-nine appearances for Fénix over the course of his first two seasons. In August 2017, Almagro of Primera B Nacional loaned Rodríguez. He scored once, versus Juventud Unida in the following April, in twenty-one fixtures in all competitions while with the club. On 13 June 2018, Rodríguez joined Argentine Primera División side San Martín on loan. His first match was a Copa Argentina loss to Brown on 21 July.

=== International ===
While with River Plate, Rodríguez received a call-up from the Argentina U17s for the 2011 FIFA U-17 World Cup in Mexico. He failed to make an appearance over four games as Argentina were eliminated by England in the round of sixteen.

== Career statistics ==
As of 21 September 2018.

Club statistics
Club	Season	League			Cup (Note: Includes the Copa Argentina)		League Cup		Continental		Other		Total	
Club	Season	Division	Apps	Goals	Apps	Goals	Apps	Goals	Apps	Goals	Apps	Goals	Apps	Goals
Fénix	2016	Primera B Metropolitana	14	0	0	0	—		—		0	0	14	0
Fénix	2016–17	Primera B Metropolitana	35	0	0	0	—		—		0	0	35	0
Fénix	2017–18	Primera B Metropolitana	0	0	0	0	—		—		0	0	0	0
Fénix	2018–19	Primera B Metropolitana	0	0	0	0	—		—		0	0	0	0
Fénix	Total		49	0	0	0	—		—		0	0	49	0
Almagro (loan)	2017–18	Primera B Nacional	19	1	0	0	—		—		2 (Note: Two appearances in the 2017–18 Primera B Nacional play-offs)	0	21	1
San Martín (loan)	2018–19	Primera División	4	0	1	0	—		—		0	0	5	0
Career total			72	1	1	0	—		—		2	0	75	1
