= Valentín Depietri =

Argentine professional footballer

Personal information
- Date of birth: 31 October 2000 (age 26)
- Place of birth: Tandil, Argentina
- Height: 1.78 m (5 ft 10 in)
- Position: Winger

Team information
- Current team: Talleres
- Number: 11

Youth career
- Unicen

Senior career*
| Years | Team | Apps | (Gls) |
| 2015–2019 | Unicen | | |
| 2019–2021 | Santamarina | 30 | (5) |
| 2021–2023 | Fortaleza | 25 | (1) |
| 2023– | Talleres | 103 | (10) |
- * Club domestic league appearances and goals as of 17:41, 15 November 2026 (UTC)

Valentín Depietri (born 31 October 2000) is an Argentine professional footballer who plays as a winger for Argentine club Talleres.

== Career ==
Depietri began his career at a very young age. He initially joined Unicen, before moving to an academy created by his father at the age of five. Aged ten, Depietri returned to Unicen and remained for four years. He made his senior debut in Liga Tandilense at the age of fifteen, eventually becoming a regular aged sixteen as he featured in both the regional league and Torneo Federal C. In mid-2019, Depietri headed to Santamarina; penning a two-year contract. He made his debut off the bench in Primera B Nacional against Sarmiento on 17 August, which preceded the forward scoring on his starting debut away to Chacarita Juniors on 31 August.

After ten total appearances for Santamarina, Depietri received a transfer offer from Major League Soccer side Colorado Rapids in December 2019. However, despite the club's willingness to sell, he rejected the move in order to continue his development with the Aurinegro; stating he wasn't ready to make such a jump. He ended the curtailed 2019–20 with fifteen appearances. Depietri, amid rumoured interest from Swiss Challenge League outfit Chiasso, started the subsequent 2020 campaign with a goal against Quilmes on 28 November, which was followed by strikes versus Instituto and Almagro.

== Personal life ==
Depietri's grandfather and father, both named Guillermo, played football for Santamarina; in the 1980s and 2000s respectively.

== Career statistics ==
As of 23 February 2022.

Appearances and goals by club, season and competition
| Club | Season | League | | | Cup | | Continental | | State League | | Other | | Total | |
| Club | Season | Division | Apps | Goals | Apps | Goals | Apps | Goals | Apps | Goals | Apps | Goals | Apps | Goals |
|---|---|---|---|---|---|---|---|---|---|---|---|---|---|---|
| Santamarina | 2019–20 | Primera Nacional | 15 | 1 | 0 | 0 | — | | — | | — | | 15 | 1 |
| Santamarina | 2020 | Primera Nacional | 7 | 3 | 0 | 0 | — | | — | | — | | 7 | 3 |
| Santamarina | 2021 | Primera Nacional | 8 | 1 | 0 | 0 | — | | — | | — | | 8 | 1 |
| Santamarina | Total | | 30 | 5 | 0 | 0 | — | | — | | — | | 30 | 5 |
| Fortaleza | 2021 | Série A | 5 | 0 | 1 | 0 | — | | — | | — | | 6 | 0 |
| Fortaleza | 2022 | Série A | 0 | 0 | 0 | 0 | — | | — | | 6 (Note: Appearance(s) in Copa do Nordeste) | 3 | 6 | 3 |
| Career total | | | 35 | 5 | 1 | 0 | 0 | 0 | 0 | 0 | 6 | 3 | 42 | 8 |

== Honours ==
Fortaleza

- Copa do Nordeste: 2022
- Campeonato Cearense: 2022
