= Supercopa Internacional =

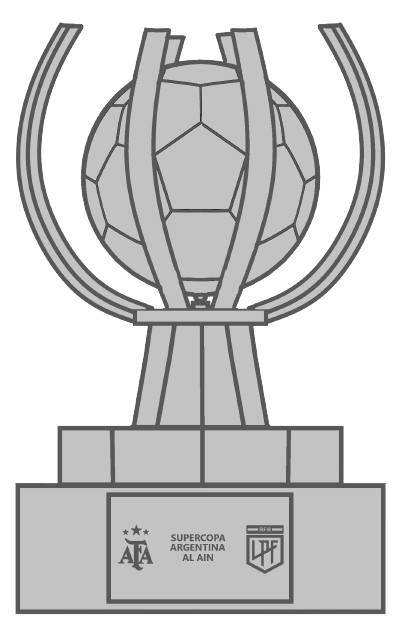
- Organiser(s): AFA (2022–present); (Argentina) Torneos (2024–present); (United Arab Emirates) Abu Dhabi Sports Council (2022)
- Founded: 2022; 4 years ago
- Region: Argentina
- Teams: 2
- Related competitions: Primera División; Trofeo de Campeones
- Domestic cup: Supercopa Argentina
- Current champions: Rosario Central
- Most championships: Racing; Talleres (C); Vélez Sarsfield; Rosario Central (1 title each)
- 2026 season

The Supercopa Internacional (English: International Super Cup) is an official national association football cup of Argentina contested by the reigning champions of Primera División and Trofeo de Campeones respectively.

The first edition was organized by the Argentine Football Association (AFA) and the Abu Dhabi Sports Council, after an agreement between both organizations which included four editions of the competition being held in Abu Dhabi (up to 2026). It is similar to the existing Supercopa Argentina, but played outside Argentina. The AFA rescinded the tournament for the 2023 edition and consequently became a one-off tournament that would not see regular continuity.

== History ==
At first, it had been stipulated that it was Supercopa Argentina (the national cup contested by winners of Primera División and Copa Argentina since 2012) the tournament to be held in Abu Dhabi.

As a result, Boca Juniors and Racing will contest the international tournament while Boca Juniors and Patronato will play the Supercopa Argentina in a domestic venue.

Finally the AFA created an international version of Supercopa Argentina named "Supercopa Internacional" to be held in Abu Dhabi to fulfil the previous commitment, contested between winners of Primera División and Trofeo de Campeones.

Despite the agreement between the AFA and the Abu Dhabi Sports council, the 2023 edition would be held in Argentina and entirely organised by the AFA. The Estadio Malvinas Argentinas in Mendoza would be the venue. In December 2024, it was announced that AFA had established a partnership with media company Torneos y Competencias to relaunch the competition, with the 2023 edition being held in Asunción, Paraguay.

== List of champions ==
Keys

- PD: Winners or runners-up of Primera División
- TC: Winners of Trofeo de Campeones.
- (In bracket, title count):

| Ed. | Year | Winners | Score | Runners-up | Venue | City | Country | Ref. |
|---|---|---|---|---|---|---|---|---|
| 1 | 2022 | Racing (TC) (1) | 2–1 | Boca Juniors (PD) | Hazza bin Zayed Stadium | Al Ain | UAE | |
| 2 | 2023 | Talleres (C) (PD) (1) | 0–0 (a.e.t.) (3–2 p) | River Plate (TC) | Estadio General Pablo Rojas | Asunción | Paraguay | |
| 3 | 2024 | Vélez Sarsfield (PD) (1) | 2–0 | Estudiantes (LP) (TC) | Libertadores de América | Avellaneda | Argentina | |
| 4 | 2026 | Rosario Central (PD) (1) | 3–1 | Estudiantes (LP) (TC) | Único Madre de Ciudades | Santiago del Estero | Argentina | |

== Records ==
| Rank | Club | Titles | Runn. | Seasons won | Seasons run. |
|---|---|---|---|---|---|
| 1 | Racing | 1 | — | 2022 | — |
| 1 | Talleres (C) | 1 | — | 2023 | — |
| 1 | Vélez Sarsfield | 1 | — | 2024 | — |
| 1 | Rosario Central | 1 | — | 2026 | — |
| — | Estudiantes (LP) | — | 2 | — | 2024, 2026 |
| — | Boca Juniors | — | 1 | — | 2022 |
| — | River Plate | — | 1 | — | 2023 |
