= Talleres de Córdoba =

Sports club in Argentina

Talleres
- Full name: Club Atlético Talleres
- Nicknames: La T (The T); Matadores (The Killers); Albiazules (The Blue and White)
- Founded: 12 October 1913; 113 years ago
- Ground: Estadio Mario Alberto Kempes
- Capacity: 57,000
- Owner: 74,262 partners
- Chairman: Andrés Fassi
- Manager: Omar De Felippe
- League: Primera División
- 2024: Primera División, 2nd of 28
- Website: clubtalleres.com.ar
Home colours	Away colours	Third colours

Club Atlético Talleres (Spanish pronunciation: [ˈkluβ aˈtletiko taˈʎeɾes]; lit. 'Workshops Athletic Club'), mostly known simply as Talleres ([taˈʃeɾes] in Rioplatense accent and [taˈʒeɾes] or [taˈjeɾe] in Cordobés accent; lit. 'Workshops'), is an Argentine professional sports club based in the city of Córdoba.

The institution is mostly known for its football team, which currently plays in the Argentine Primera División. Talleres was three times runner-up of the First Division (1977, 2023, and 2024), and two times runner-up of the Copa Argentina (2020 and 2022).

They won an international tournament in 1999, the Copa Conmebol (now Copa Sudamericana). "La T" participated in many recent editions of the Copa Sudamericana as well as the Copa Libertadores, the highest level football competition in South America, in which they reached the Quarter-Finals in 2022.

"La T" also invests actively on its Academy, which has nurtured a number of well-known footballers: José Luis Cuciuffo, Daniel Willington, Luis Antonio Ludueña, Luis Galván, and Victorio Ocaño, in previous years; and Javier Pastore, Julio Buffarini, Cristian Pavón, and Emanuel Reynoso in recent years.

Galván, as well as Miguel Oviedo and José Daniel Valencia (the three of them playing for Talleres), were part of the squad that lead Argentina's national team to win the 1978 FIFA World Cup. Other players that made it to their national teams include Mateo Retegui, Facundo Medina, Piero Hincapié, Ramón Sosa, and Guido Herrera.

Talleres women's team plays in the Primera División A and is one of the most winning teams in the country. Florencia Pianello is the all-time scorer taking into account both men's and women's divisions of the club. Academy-graduated players who made it to Argentina's national team include Catalina Primo and Paulina Gramaglia.

Talleres' main rival is Belgrano: Their rivalry is known as "el clásico cordobés". Talleres won 96 matches, while their rival won 76 times, in official games. Both teams also share derbies with Instituto and Racing, two other important teams of the city.

Talleres is among the teams with the highest number of spectators per match in the world.

== History ==
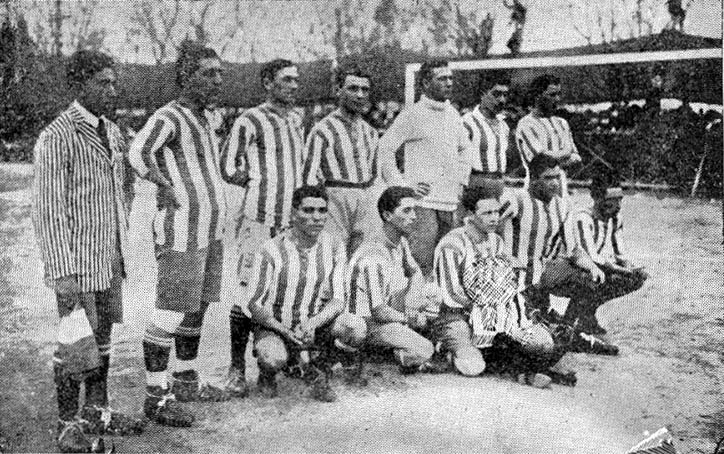
A team of Talleres in 1922

The club was founded in 1913 as "Atlético Talleres Central Córdoba" by workers of the Córdoba Central Railway, with support from the company. They were mostly English, among which there was their founder, Thomas Lawson. They took their blue and white colours from Blackburn Rovers F.C., the club that Lawson supported in England. Apart from Atlético Talleres, one of the clubs affiliated to "Federación Cordobesa de Fútbol" (Córdoba Football Federation) was Olimpo, formed by young players participating in second and third divisions.

In 1913 Olimpo was expelled after their players were involved in a riot in disagreement with some referee decisions. After Olimpo beat Atlético Talleres in a friendly match, the club executives encouraged the merger of both clubs with the aim of adding Olimpo players to their team. In 1914, the merger was fulfilled keeping the name "Talleres Central Córdoba". In 1914 Talleres joined the Córdoba local league.

Under this name, Talleres Central Córdoba won the 1915 and 1916 championships. The following year the club was forced to change its name after some incidents in a match that caused player Horacio Salvatelli to be arrested. When some days later Talleres did not allow its players to a local combined, the body expelled the club from the league. Nevertheless, Talleres would rejoined the league in 1918 under the condition to change its name so the club was registered as "Club Atlético Talleres", also winning the championship that same year. Apart from its name, Talleres had to modify the date of foundation (to 12 October 1913) to register as a legal entity.

In 1931 the club was given a land in "Barrio Jardín" to build its own stadium. The project was carried out by engineers Allende Posse and Agenor Villagra, at a cost of $70,000. The stadium was inaugurated on 12 October 1931, with a friendly match between Talleres and Uruguayan side Rampla Juniors. The stadium would be refurbished in 1951 to host a maximum of 18,000 spectators.

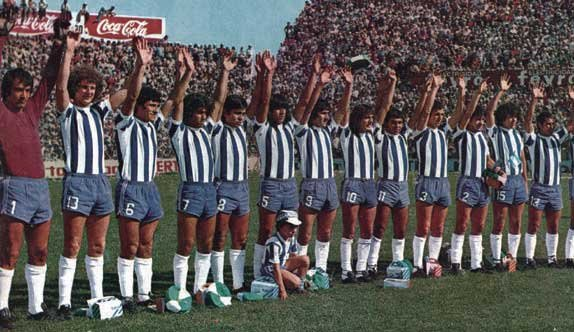
A team of Talleres in 1977. One year later, the club was about to win the Primera División championship but lost to C.A. Independiente in the final

In 1969 the team played for the first time in the Argentine Primera División in the Nacional Championship. During the 1970s, the heyday of the Córdoba local league in the national scene, they participated several times in the Nacional championship, in 1976 Luis Ludueña was the championship top scorer with 12 goals, in the 1977 Nacional Championship Talleres finished in second place, losing to Independiente the finals on the away goals rule, and in 1978 José Reinaldi scored 18 goals and was the championship top scorer. Talleres contributed three players to the Argentine squad that won the 1978 FIFA World Cup, with Talleres' captain Luis Galván as a starter in the final as a center back. Miguel Oviedo and Jose Daniel Valencia were substitutes. The '78 WC team featured several other prominent players that got their start in the golden era of the Córdoba local league, such as Mario Kempes and Osvaldo Ardiles, both at Instituto Atletico Central Cordoba in the early-1970s.

Starting in 1980, Talleres became a regular of the Metropolitano championship and finished in third place.

Talleres played in the Argentine Primera División until the 1993 Torneo Clausura when Talleres was relegated to the Primera B Nacional. Talleres was promoted to Argentine Primera División after the 1993–94 championship, but was again related after a poor performance in 1994–95 season. The following season, the club finished first during the Clausura tournament of the Second Division but lost the Championship to Huracán de Corrientes.

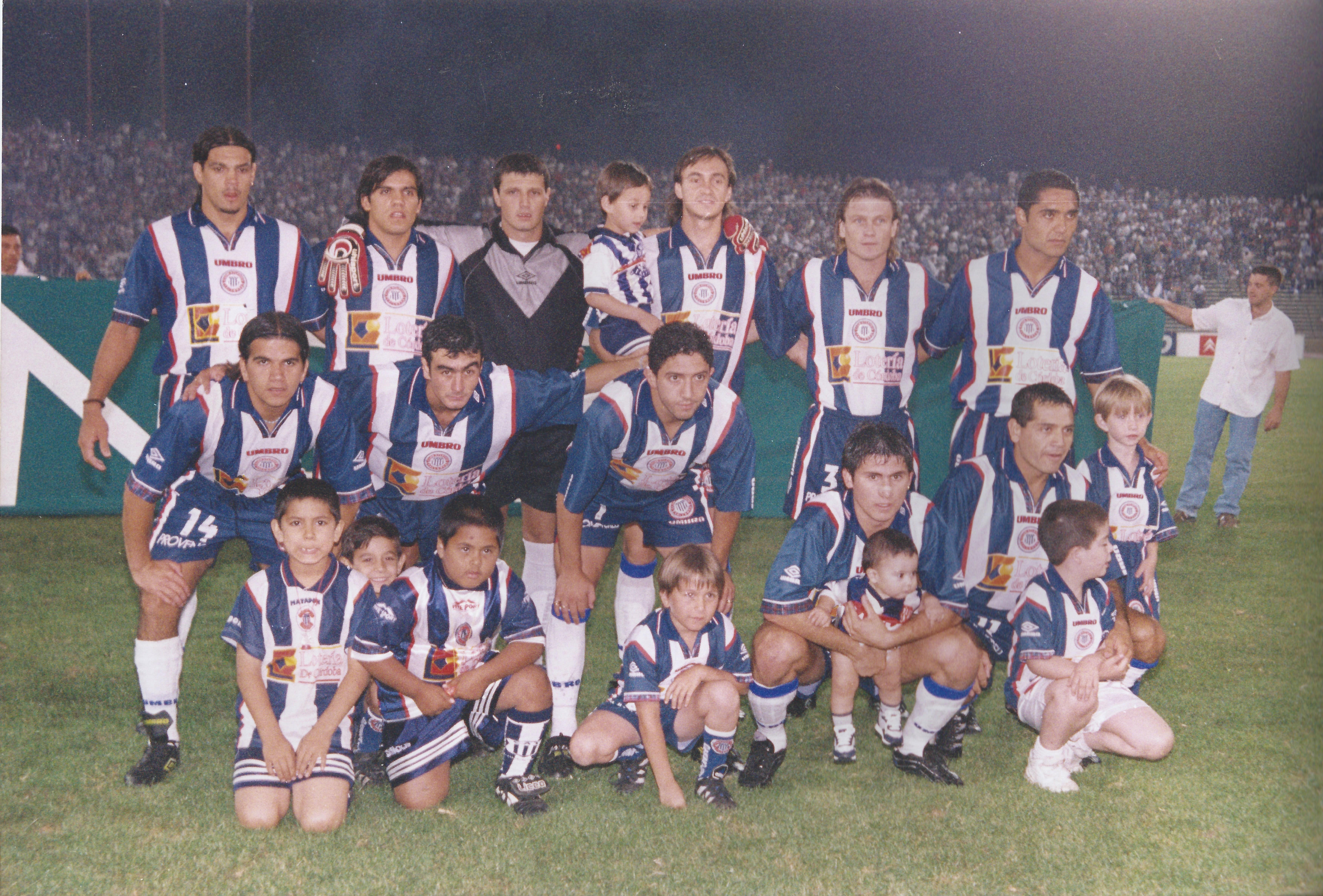
The team that won the Copa CONMEBOL in 1999

In 1998, during a game (later remembered by fans as "The Final of the Century", Talleres won its first Argentine title, the 1997/98 Primera B Nacional championship on penalty kick shootout against all-time rival Belgrano de Córdoba, earning them a promotion to the First Division. Next year the club won its first and only international title, the 1999 Copa CONMEBOL (the precursor of the current Copa Sudamericana) against CSA from Brazil.

The following season, Talleres' good performance in first division qualified the team to play the 2001 Copa Mercosur and the 2002 Copa Libertadores, being the first and only team from Córdoba to qualify for those continental tournaments. Talleres reached the round of 16 in the Mercosur, only to lose against Gremio. In Copa Libertadores, Talleres had a poor performance, being eliminated in the first stage.

Despite finishing in third place during the Torneo Clausura tournament of the 2003–04 season and qualifying for the Copa Libertadores again, Talleres was relegated, due to poor results in the previous 2 seasons, after losing to Argentinos Juniors in the promotion/relegation play-off. By Argentine rules, the team lost its Libertadores bid because of this.

In 2008–09 Talleres was dismissed again, this time to the Torneo Argentino A via the point average system despite finishing in 12th place of 20 teams in Primera B Nacional.

On 15 November 2010, the IFFHS produced a report on the top 200 teams in the American continent from 2001 to that date. Talleres was No. 130, the highest position for a Córdoba Province team in the ranking.

In May 2013, Talleres was promoted to Primera B Nacional after defeating San Jorge by 1–0. Later, Talleres returned to the third division but it was promoted in 2015, and, in 2016, after 12 years Talleres earned the promotion to First Division. They achieved so by not losing any match in the whole tournament, being the first time to accomplish this in Argentine football.

During those years, Talleres gained notoriety for its Reserves and Academy divisions. Talleres won the national Reserves Tournament twice in a row in the 2016-17 and 2017-18 seasons.

In 2019, Talleres played the Copa Libertadores again. In 2021, Talleres played Copa Sudamericana. After an outstanding performance in Copa Argentina, in which "la T" reached the final, and the national league, in which it finished in the third position, Talleres returned once again to Copa Libertadores for the next year.

Talleres made its best performance yet at 2022 Copa Libertadores, by reaching the Quarter-finals. However, the poor performance at the national league left the club with no international participation for 2023. For the second year in a row, Talleres was runner-up in Copa Argentina, losing the final 0-1 to Patronato.

The club has also sold players to important clubs in Europe in that time, in a historical context in which most clubs that sell players directly to UEFA teams are mostly the ones of Buenos Aires. Some of them were Nahuel Bustos, Piero Hincapié, Facundo Medina, Andrés Cubas and Ramón Sosa. Many of them got to play in their national teams.

Other footballers that were capped to play for their country after their time in Talleres include Julio Buffarini and Mateo Retegui; while Alan Franco, Matías Catalán, Miguel Navarro, and Diego Valoyes were capped while they were part of the club.

Between 2023 and 2024, Talleres finished in the second position of the Primera División two times in a row. This allowed the club to be considered one of the best South American clubs of the last decades and secured consecutive berths for playing Copa Libertadores.

== Presidents ==
- (1913) - Thomas Lawson
- (1914) - Cipriano Sánchez
- (1915) - Adolfo Hannel
- (1916 - 1917) - Enrique France
- (1918) - Romulo Canale
- (1919) - Enrique Guillaume
- (1920) - Juan Finlay
- (1921) - Thomas Lawson
- (1922) - Enrique Guillaume
- (1923) - Juan Carlos O'Brien
- (1924) - Antonio Estela
- (1925 - 1926) - Félix Bottini
- (1927) - Enrique France
- (1927) - César Pieri
- (1928) - Alfredo Barissone
- (1929) - Juan Dellacua
- (1930) - Abel Pereyra
- (1931) - Alberto Bernis Sales
- (1932) - Miguel Tobler
- (1933 - 1936) - José León Chercoles
- (1937) - Miguel Tobler
- (1938) - Francisco Pérez Maciel
- (1939 - 1940) - Miguel Tobler
- (1941 - 1942) - Ángel Peralta
- (1943) - Luis Zapata
- (1944 - 1946) - Carlos Molina
- (1947 - 1950) - Edgardo Pérez Cortés
- (1951 - 1952) - Félix Curtino
- (1953) - Enrique Carratala
- (1954 - 1955) - Félix Curtino
- (1956 - 1957) - Aníbal Grecco
- (1958 - 1959) - Pedro Ballester
- (1960 - 1961) - Vicente Rossella
- (1962) - Arturo Carrasco Gómez
- (1963) - Edgardo Álvarez Vocos
- (1964) - Félix Curtino
- (1965) - Alfredo Arocena
- (1966) - Edgardo Álvarez Vocos
- (1967 - 1968) - Rodolfo Berardo
- (1969) - Luis Teco
- (1970) - Abrahan Litvak
- (1971) - Avelino Guirales
- (1972) - Miguel Srur
- (1973) - Fernando Rencoret
- (1974 - 1986) - Amadeo Nuccetelli
- (1987) - Rogelio Egea
- (1988) - Miguel Macias
- (1989) - Egidio Heyd
- (1990 - 1991) - Bernabé Muttoni
- (1992) - Miguel Srur
- (1993) - Rafael Lascano
- (1994 - 1997) - Victor Szumik
- (1997) - Rolando Martin
- (1998 - 2004) - Carlos Dossetti
- (2004 - 2014) - (Note: Due to a bankruptcy, the club was managed by a trust.)
- (2014 - present) - Andrés Fassi

== Managers ==
- Leopoldo Ledesma (1929 - 1930)
- Emilio Manuel Fernández (1931 - 1932)
- Enrique Palomini (1933 - 1936)
- Eduardo Ponce (1937 - 1938)
- Luis Santiago Bustos (1938)
- Enrique Palomini (1938 - 1940)
- Eduardo Ponce (1941)
- Rodolfo Bútori (1942 - 1946)
- Osvaldo Sella (1947)
- Máximo Disandro (1947 - 1948)
- Ramón Bresolí (1949 - 1950)
- Rodolfo Bútori (1951 - 1952)
- José Bútori (1952)
- Leopoldo Ledesma (1952)
- Domingo Carunchio (1952)
- Atilio Garlatti (1953 - 1954)
- Máximo Disandro (1954)
- Rodolfo Bútori (1955)
- Ramón Bresolí (1956)
- Máximo Disandro (1957)
- Amable Rubén López (1957)
- Rodolfo Bútori (1958 - 1959)
- Pedro Gordillo (1959)
- Atilio Willington (1959 - 1961)
- Fernando Belucci (1962)
- Rodolfo Bútori (1962 - 1963)
- Amable Rubén López (1963 - 1964)
- Rodolfo Bútori (1965)
- Atilio Willington (1965)
- Eduardo Pereyra (1966)
- Fernando Belucci (1967)
- Domingo Boero (1967)
- Héctor Burgos (1968)
- Hipólito Toledo (1969)
- Miguel Ponce (1970 - 1971)
- Augusto Fumero (1971)
- Nicolás Campos (1972)
- Miguel Antonio Romero (1972)
- Llamil Simes (1972)
- Miguel Ponce (1973)
- Ángel Labruna (1974)
- Adolfo Pedernera (1975)
- Humberto Taborda - Gualberto Mugione (1976)
- Rubén Bravo (1976)
- Roberto Marcos Saporiti (1977 - 1979)
- José Omar Pastoriza (1980)
- Vicente Rodríguez (1981)
- Humberto Taborda (1981)
- Ángel Labruna (1981 - 1983)
- Daniel Willington (1983)
- Miguel Oviedo (1983)
- Alfio Basile (1983)
- Humberto Maschio (1984)
- José Omar Reinaldi (1984 - 1986)
- Pedro Marchetta (1986)
- Humberto Taborda (1986)
- Héctor Baley - Miguel Oviedo (1986)
- Sebastián Viberti (1986 - 1987)
- José Omar Reinaldi (1987 - 1988)
- Roberto Saporiti (1988 - 1989)
- Eduardo Luján Manera 1990)
- Miguel Oviedo (1990)
- Daniel Willington (1990)
- Miguel Oviedo (1990 - 1991)
- Julio Correa (1991)
- Eduardo Manera (1991)
- José Omar Pastoriza (1992 - 1993)
- Humberto Grondona (1993)
- Salvador Ragusa (1993)
- Miguel Antonio Romero (1993)
- José Manuel Ramos Delgado (1993 - 1994)
- Daniel Willington (1994)
- Fernando Areán (1994)
- Roberto Saporiti (1995)
- José Omar Reinaldi (1995)
- Humberto Taborda (1995 - 1996)
- Osvaldo Sosa (1996)
- Ricardo Gareca (1996 - 1997)
- Humberto Zuccarelli (1997 - 1998)
- Ricardo Gareca (1998 - 2000)
- Juan José López (2000 - 2001)
- Ricardo Gareca (2001)
- Mario Zanabria (2001)
- Mario Ballarino (2001 - 2002)
- Enzo Trossero (2002)
- Marcelo Arce - Sergio Coleoni (2002)
- Sergio Batista (2002 - 2003)
- Ángel Bocanelli (2003)
- Luis Cubilla (2003)
- José Omar Pastoriza (2003)
- Horacio Cirrincione (2003)
- Juan José López (2004)
- Leonardo Madelón (2004)
- José Omar Reinaldi (2004)
- Daniel Willington - José Trignani (2005)
- Héctor Arzubialde (2005)
- Emilio Commisso (2005)
- Roberto Oste (2005)
- Roberto Saporiti (2006)
- Roberto Oste - Fabián Carrizo (2006)
- Ricardo Gareca (2007)
- Roberto Oste (2007)
- Salvador Capitano (2007)
- Rubén Darío Insúa (2007 - 2008)
- Carlos Bustos - Jorge Grassi (2008)
- Ángel Comizzo (2008)
- Humberto Grondona (2008)
- Juan Amador Sánchez (2009)
- Raúl Alejandro Peralta (2009)
- Roberto Saporiti (2009)
- Andrés Rebottaro (2010)
- Héctor Arzubialde (2010 - 2011)
- Gustavo Coleoni (2011)
- José María Bianco (2011)
- Héctor Chazarreta (2011)
- Arnaldo Sialle (2011 - 2013)
- Rubén Forestello (2014)
- Jorge Ghiso (2014)
- Sergio Coleoni - Mario Obulgen (2014)
- Ángel Hoyos (2014)
- Frank Darío Kudelka (2015 - 2018)
- Juan Pablo Vojvoda (2018 - 2019)
- Alexander Medina (2019 - 2021)
- Guillermo Hoyos (2022)
- Pedro Caixinha (2022)
- Javier Gandolfi (2022 - 2023)
- Walter Ribonetto (2024)
- Alexander Medina (2024 - 2025)
- Pablo Guiñazú (2025)
- Diego Cocca (2025)
- Carlos Tevez (2025 - 2026)
- Jorge Sampaoli (2026 - present)

== Colours and badge ==
=== Colours ===
The C.A. Talleres colours are specified on club's statute, they are dark blue and white. Along its history, other colors have been used for alternate kits such as yellow, orange, bordeaux, grey, black, red, among others.

=== Badge ===
The badge has had more than 20 different designs on several records through 100 years of existence of the club, with no precise details about its shape or colors.

== Players ==
=== Current squad ===
As of 6 September 2026

Note: Flags indicate national team as defined under FIFA eligibility rules; some limited exceptions apply. Players may hold more than one non-FIFA nationality.

No.	Pos.	Nation	Player
1	GK	ARG	Santino Barbi
2	DF	ARG	Timoteo Chamorro
3	DF	PAR	Alexandro Maidana
4	DF	CHI	Matías Catalán
5	MF	ARG	Matías Galarza
6	DF	ARG	Román Riquelme
7	FW	COL	Diego Valoyes (on loan from Juárez)
8	MF	ARG	Federico Fattori
10	MF	ARG	Giovanni Baroni
11	FW	ARG	Valentín Depietri
13	DF	ARG	Valentín Fascendini
15	MF	ARG	Juan Sforza (on loan from Vasco da Gama)
17	FW	URU	Agustín Álvarez (on loan from Sassuolo)
19	MF	ARG	Franco Cristaldo
20	DF	ARG	Augusto Schott (captain)

No.	Pos.	Nation	Player
21	MF	ARG	Matías Gómez
23	DF	ARG	Gabriel Báez
24	FW	ARG	Ignacio Alastra
25	DF	ARG	Thiago Baroni
26	MF	ARG	Mateo Cáceres
31	MF	ARG	Bruno Trey
32	GK	ARG	Ezequiel Unsain
35	DF	ARG	Gonzalo Nuccio
36	FW	ARG	Emiliano Chiavassa
37	FW	BRA	Rick
39	MF	ARG	Lautaro Ortiz
41	DF	ARG	Tomás Olmos
44	DF	ARG	Santiago Fernández
46	MF	ARG	Jeremías Gallard
49	FW	ARG	Valentín Dávila

=== Reserve squad ===
Note: Flags indicate national team as defined under FIFA eligibility rules; some limited exceptions apply. Players may hold more than one non-FIFA nationality.

No.	Pos.	Nation	Player
12	GK	ARG	Jeremías Florentín
40	GK	ARG	Franco Yennerich

No.	Pos.	Nation	Player
—	DF	ARG	Lucio Ferrari
—	DF	ARG	Juan Gabriel Rodríguez

=== Out on loan ===
Note: Flags indicate national team as defined under FIFA eligibility rules; some limited exceptions apply. Players may hold more than one non-FIFA nationality.

No.	Pos.	Nation	Player
3	DF	ARG	Lucas Suárez (at Sarmiento (Junín) until 31 December 2026)
7	FW	ARG	Nahuel Bustos (at Independiente Santa Fe until 31 December 2026)
12	GK	ARG	Laureano Martínez (at Güemes until 31 December 2026)
13	MF	ARG	Luis Sequeira (at Independiente Rivadavia until 31 December 2026)
14	FW	ARG	Alejandro Martínez (at Nacional until 31 December 2026)
16	DF	VEN	Miguel Navarro (at Colorado Rapids until 31 December 2026)
17	MF	ARG	Joaquín Mosqueira (at Tigre until 31 December 2026)
18	FW	COL	Luis Angulo (at Peñarol until 31 December 2026)
19	MF	ARG	Franco Moyano (at Instituto until 31 December 2026)
20	MF	ARG	Gonzalo Álvez (at Central Norte until 31 December 2026)
25	FW	ARG	David Zalazar (at Banfield until 31 December 2026)

No.	Pos.	Nation	Player
26	MF	ARG	Marcos Portillo (at FBC Melgar until 31 December 2027)
26	MF	ARG	Carlos Villalba (at Sarmiento (Junín) until 31 December 2026)
26	FW	ARG	Diego Barrera (at Central Córdoba until 31 December 2026)
33	MF	ARG	Emanuel Reynoso (at Deportivo Cali until 31 December 2026)
33	GK	ARG	Joaquín Blázquez (at Independiente until 31 December 2026)
35	DF	ARG	Tomás Kummer (at Racing (Córdoba) until 31 December 2026)
37	MF	ARG	Agustín Venezia (at Deportes Iquique until 31 December 2026)
55	MF	ARG	Martín Río (at San Lorenzo until 30 June 2027)
77	FW	PAR	Ronaldo Martínez (at Vélez Sarsfield until 31 December 2027)
99	FW	CHI	Bruno Barticciotto (at Huracán until 31 December 2026)

=== Current coaching staff ===
Position	Staff
Head coach	(Argentina) Jorge Sampaoli
Assistant coach	(Brazil) Diogo Meschine
Fitness coach	(Argentina) Marcos Fernández
Fitness coach	(Argentina) Pablo Fernández
Video analyst	(Argentina) Cristian Del Río
Video analyst	(Argentina) Nicolás Lunghitano
Goalkeeper coach	(Argentina) Juan Agüero
Doctor	(Argentina) Jesús Mux
Physiotherapist	(Argentina) Santiago Grosso
Physiotherapist	(Argentina) Tomás Nobrega
Massage therapist	(Argentina) Adrián Bertacchini
Nutritionist	(Argentina) Luciano Espíndola
Psychologist	(Argentina) Nicolás Franco
Dentist	(Argentina) Dentis Odontología Privada
Equipment manager	(Argentina) Matías Coronel
Equipment manager	(Argentina) César Nocella
Performance manager	(Argentina) Guillermo Pérez
Technical secretary	(Argentina) Luis Achaval

== Honours ==
=== Senior titles ===
Keys

- Record
- ^{(s)} Shared record

Type	Competition	Titles	Winning years
National (Cups)	Supercopa Internacional	1^{(s)}	2023
International	Copa Conmebol	1	1999

=== Other titles ===
Titles won in lower divisions:

- Primera B Nacional (2): 1997–98, 2016
- Torneo Federal A (1): 2015
- Torneo Argentino A (1): 2012–13

=== Regional ===
- Liga Cordobesa de Fútbol (27): 1915, 1916, 1918, 1921, 1922, 1923, 1924, 1934, 1938, 1939, 1941, 1944, 1945, 1948, 1949, 1951, 1953, 1958, 1960, 1963, 1969, 1974, 1975, 1976, 1977, 1978, 1979
- Campeonato Preparación LCF (11): 1937, 1938, 1940, 1942, 1944, 1946, 1950, 1951, 1952, 2011, 2013
- Campeonato Clausura LCF (6): 1960, 1964, 1975, 1976, 1977, 1978
- Campeonato Apertura LCF (4): 1975, 1976, 1977, 1979
- Campeonato Competencia LCF (3): 1960, 1963, 1966
- Campeonato Sidral LCF (2): 1932, 1933
- Campeonato Iniciación LCF (2): 1960, 1963
- Campeonato de la Bandera (1): 1915
- Campeonato Vélez Sarsfield (1): 1916
- Copa de la Bandera (1): 1917
- Copa Gath y Chaves (1): 1925
- Campeonato de Honor (1): 1933
- Campeonato Béccar Varela (1): 1934
- Campeonato Clasificación LCF (1): 1969
- Campeonato Zonal LCF (1): 1974

=== Friendly ===
- Copa Hermandad (1): 1977

== Records ==
=== All-time records ===
- Victory:
  - Primera División – 8–2 v Mariano Moreno in 1982.
  - Primera B Nacional – 6–0 v Huracán Corrientes in 1997.
  - En el Torneo Argentino A – 5–1 a Estudiantes de Río Cuarto en 2010.
  - Copa Argentina – 4–1 v General Paz Juniors in 2011.
  - Liga Cordobesa de Fútbol – 10–0 v Sportivo Belgrano in 1951.
- Defeat:
  - Primera División – 0–12 v Argentinos Juniors in 1986.
  - Primera B Nacional – 0–4 v Central Córdoba in 1993 and Almirante Brown in 2007.
  - Torneo Argentino A – 1–5 v Guillermo Brown in 2011.
  - Copa Argentina – 0–2 v Defensa y Justicia in 2016.
- Most goals scored overall – 163, Miguel Antonio Romero
- Most appearances overall – 502, Luis Galván
- Most goals scored on AFA tournaments – 75, Mario Bevilacqua
- Most appearances on AFA tournaments – 366, Miguel Oviedo
- Most goals scored on international tournaments – 5, Pablo Cuba
- Most appearances on international tournaments – 20, Mario Cuenca and Julián Maidana
- Goalkeeper's most unbeaten streak – 701 minutes, Guido Herrera

=== Other records ===
- It has the fourth longest unbeaten streak worldwide.
- It has the third unbeaten streak in AFA tournaments, after Midland and Boca Juniors.
- Talleres won the 2016 Primera B Nacional unbeaten and it is the only team in Argentina that could achieve this performance.
- It is the only team in Córdoba that played Copa Libertadores.
- Along with Racing and Godoy Cruz, they are the non-porteños teams which had the best performance on Primera División, finishing in the 2nd place once each.
- It is the non-porteño team which contributed the most in giving players to the Argentina national football team for the FIFA World Cup.
- It has one of the biggest virtual communities of Argentina.
- There were attendances of more than 60000 people even in third division' matches.
- Along with América Mineiro, they are the only teams that were never defeated in an U-20 Copa Libertadores match.
- It reached the 36th position in the Club World Ranking.
- It was one of the clubs with the highest attendance in 2024.

== Women's team ==
Talleres' women's team, also known as Las Matadoras, plays in the Campeonato de Fútbol Femenino. They joined the national tournaments in 2022, after having played for 10 years in the local league.

Some of their historical players include Florencia Pianello, Yamila Cazón, Paulina Gramaglia, Carolina López, Eliana Capdevila, and Brisa Jara.

In their first season playing at the Primera C, third tier fo Argentine women's football, they got the promotion after reaching the second position, right after San Luis. Two years later, they got the promotion to Primera A, the highest level in women's national football, after winning the championship of Primera B.

Talleres' 2024 season was historic: "Las Matadoras" never lost a match out of the 22 they have played, having won 21 of them and only drawing in the last game.
