= 2019–20 Deportivo Morón season =

Deportivo Morón
2019–20 season
- President: Roque Labozzeta
- Manager: Arnaldo Sialle
- Stadium: Estadio Nuevo Francisco Urbano
- Top goalscorer: League: Mauricio Alonso (2); All: Mauricio Alonso (2)

The 2019–20 season is Deportivo Morón's 3rd consecutive season in the second division of Argentine football, Primera B Nacional.

The season generally covers the period from 1 July 2019 to 30 June 2020.

== Review ==
=== Pre-season ===
Deportivo Morón unveiled six new players on 10 June 2019. Dylan Glaby and Franco Ravizzoli came from Primera C Metropolitana duo Argentino and Deportivo Merlo, while Lucas Pérez Godoy and Diego Tonetto penned contract terms from Primera B Nacional's Mitre and Platense. Agustín Mansilla signed from Lanús, while Kevin Gissi joined from Italian club Cuneo. Matías Nizzo renewed his loan from Chacarita Juniors on 14 June. On 18 June, signing number seven was confirmed as Santamarina's Francisco Oliver put pen to paper. Matías Cortave was next through the door, as the full-back signed a deal from Brown on 27 June. Esteban Ciaccheri completed a move in on 29 June from Primera B de Chile side Rangers. 2018–19 loans expired on and around 30 June.

After suffering a loss to San Lorenzo in a pre-season friendly on 6 July, Morón won the secondary encounter later in the day thanks to a Damián Akerman goal. Sebastián Montero headed off to Justo José de Urquiza on 7 July. Morón played out two goalless friendly draws with Flandria on 10 July. Morón and Villa Dálmine met each other in friendlies on 13 July, subsequently playing out two draws. José D'Angelo secured terms from San Telmo on 15 July. A tie with Tigre on 20 July made it five straight draws in pre-season for Morón, though that streak was concluded with a victory over Tigre on the same day. Lucas Chacana arrived from Los Andes on 24 July. Due to inclement weather, on 26 July, Morón and Colegiales cancelled their friendly that was planned for the following day.

On 29 July, Gastón González went to Belgrano. Morón shared wins with Agropecuario on 2 August. On 7 August, Morón put six goals past Puerto Nuevo of Primera D Metropolitana - four of which were scored by Kevin Gissi. A friendly encounter with Sportivo Barracas was cancelled due to bad weather on 9 August, in order to protect the Estadio Nuevo Francisco Urbano pitch. 12 August saw Facundo Pumpido sign for Guillermo Brown.

=== August ===
Morón and Nueva Chicago neutralised each other on 19 August, as their opening fixture in Primera B Nacional ended without goals in Buenos Aires. Morón got their opening win of the season on 24 August, with Esteban Ciaccheri netting against Guillermo Brown. Matchday three saw Morón travel to face Alvarado in Mar del Plata, with el Gallito coming away with a 2–4 victory as Mauricio Alonso netted an all-important brace.

== Squad ==
Squad No.	Nationality	Name	Position(s)	Date of birth (age)	Signed from
Goalkeepers
	Argentina	Bruno Galván	GK	8 May 1994 (age 32)	Gualaceo
	Argentina	Franco Ravizzoli	GK	9 July 1997 (age 29)	Deportivo Merlo
	Argentina	Franco Rojas	GK	21 October 1996 (age 30)	Academy
	Argentina	Julio Salvá	GK	18 May 1987 (age 39)	Acassuso
Defenders
	Argentina	Fabricio Alvarenga	RB	17 January 1996 (age 30)	Vélez Sarsfield (loan)
	Argentina	Mariano Bracamonte	DF	24 April 1999 (age 27)	Academy
	Argentina	Cristian Broggi	DF	26 March 1993 (age 33)	Academy
	Argentina	Juan Celaya	CB	14 February 1992 (age 34)	Villa Dálmine
	Argentina	Matías Cortave	RB	27 June 1992 (age 34)	Brown
	Argentina	Manuel Guiñazú	CB	29 May 1997 (age 29)	Academy
	Argentina	Luciano Lapetina	LB	10 February 1996 (age 30)	Godoy Cruz
	Argentina	Nicolás Martínez	LB	20 June 1984 (age 42)	Fénix
	Argentina	Emiliano Mayola	DF	2 August 1987 (age 39)	Flandria
	Argentina	Francisco Oliver	CB	30 May 1995 (age 31)	Santamarina
	Argentina	Valentín Perales	CB	2 August 1995 (age 31)	San Lorenzo
Midfielders
	Argentina	Iván Álvarez	MF	18 February 2000 (age 26)	Academy
	Argentina	Gonzalo Baglivo	DM	26 February 1996 (age 30)	UT Cajamarca
	Argentina	José D'Angelo	AM	5 April 1989 (age 37)	San Telmo
	Argentina	Dylan Glaby	CM	7 April 1996 (age 30)	Argentino
	Argentina	Matías Guayaré	MF	4 July 2000 (age 26)	Academy
	Argentina	Agustín Lavezzi	MF	15 January 1996 (age 30)	Coronel Aguirre
	Argentina	Cristian Lillo	MF	12 August 1985 (age 41)	Flandria
	Argentina	Gerardo Martínez	MF	11 April 1991 (age 35)	Academy
	Argentina	Matías Nizzo	CM	2 February 1989 (age 37)	Chacarita Juniors (loan)
	Argentina	Matías Pardo	AM	7 April 1995 (age 31)	Academy
	Argentina	Lucas Pérez Godoy	DM	30 June 1993 (age 33)	Mitre
	Argentina	Federico Prada	DM	23 February 1993 (age 33)	Sacachispas
	Argentina	Nicolás Ramírez	LW	18 February 1988 (age 38)	Los Andes
	Argentina	Diego Tonetto	LM	5 December 1988 (age 37)	Platense
	Argentina	Nisim Vergara	MF	1 August 1998 (age 28)	Academy
Forwards
	Argentina	Damián Akerman	FW	25 March 1980 (age 46)	Tristán Suárez
	Uruguay	Mauricio Alonso	FW	12 February 1994 (age 32)	Lorca Deportiva
	Argentina	Lucas Chacana	LW	16 June 1993 (age 33)	Los Andes
	Argentina	Diego Cháves	CF	14 February 1986 (age 40)	Arsenal de Sarandí
	Argentina	Esteban Ciaccheri	FW	20 May 1991 (age 35)	Rangers (loan)
	Switzerland	Kevin Gissi	CF	10 September 1992 (age 34)	Cuneo
	Argentina	Lucas Poletto	CF	20 June 1994 (age 32)	Sportivo Belgrano

== Transfers ==
Domestic transfer windows:
3 July 2019 to 24 September 2019
20 January 2020 to 19 February 2020.

=== Transfers in ===
Date from	Position	Nationality	Name	From	Ref.
3 July 2019 (Note: Deal agreed on 10 June 2019)	CF	Switzerland	Kevin Gissi	Cuneo	
3 July 2019 (Note: Deal agreed on 10 June 2019)	CM	Argentina	Dylan Glaby	Argentino	
3 July 2019 (Note: Deal agreed on 10 June 2019)	FW	Argentina	Agustín Mansilla	Lanús	
3 July 2019 (Note: Deal agreed on 10 June 2019)	DM	Argentina	Lucas Pérez Godoy	Mitre	
3 July 2019 (Note: Deal agreed on 10 June 2019)	GK	Argentina	Franco Ravizzoli	Deportivo Merlo	
3 July 2019 (Note: Deal agreed on 10 June 2019)	LM	Argentina	Diego Tonetto	Platense	
3 July 2019 (Note: Deal agreed on 18 June 2019)	CB	Argentina	Francisco Oliver	Santamarina	
3 July 2019 (Note: Deal agreed on 27 June 2019)	RB	Argentina	Matías Cortave	Brown	
3 July 2019 (Note: Deal agreed on 29 June 2019)	FW	Argentina	Esteban Ciaccheri	Rangers	
15 July 2019	AM	Argentina	José D'Angelo	San Telmo	
24 July 2019	LW	Argentina	Lucas Chacana	Los Andes	

=== Transfers out ===
Date from	Position	Nationality	Name	To	Ref.
7 July 2019	FW	Argentina	Sebastián Montero	Justo José de Urquiza	
29 July 2019	CM	Argentina	Gastón González	Belgrano	
12 August 2019	CF	Argentina	Facundo Pumpido	Guillermo Brown	

== Friendlies ==
=== Pre-season ===
Deportivo Morón, on 20 June 2019, announced friendlies with San Lorenzo and Tigre. The latter being set for 20 July, with the former taking place on 6 July; the same day when they were also set to face Flandria in Jáuregui - as revealed by their opponents on 18 June - though that was later rescheduled, for Morón, for 10 July. Final details, including a kick-off time of 09:30, for the San Lorenzo encounter were told on 5 July. Villa Dálmine communicated a friendly with Morón was scheduled for 13 July. Colegiales would visit Morón on 27 July. On 29 July, Morón revealed three new pre-season opponents in Agropecuario, Puerto Nuevo and Sportivo Barracas.

Win Draw Loss

6 July 2019 Friendly	San Lorenzo	3–0	Deportivo Morón	Buenos Aires, Argentina
09:00 GMT-3	B. Pittón; F. Coloccini	Deportivo Morón; Olé; 70 min. match		Stadium: Estadio Pedro Bidegain; Attendance: 0 (Note: Behind closed doors.)

6 July 2019 Friendly	San Lorenzo	0–1	Deportivo Morón	Buenos Aires, Argentina
		Deportivo Morón; Olé; 75 min. match	D. Akerman	Stadium: Estadio Pedro Bidegain; Attendance: 0 (Note: Behind closed doors.)

10 July 2019 Friendly	Deportivo Morón	0–0	Flandria	Morón, Argentina
		Deportivo Morón; Grupo La Provincia		Stadium: Estadio Nuevo Francisco Urbano

10 July 2019 Friendly	Deportivo Morón	0–0	Flandria	Morón, Argentina
		Deportivo Morón; Grupo La Provincia		Stadium: Estadio Nuevo Francisco Urbano

13 July 2019 Friendly	Villa Dálmine	0–0	Deportivo Morón	Campana, Argentina
10:00 GMT-3		Deportivo Morón; Grupo La Provincia; 60 min. match		Stadium: Estadio El Coliseo de Mitre y Puccini

13 July 2019 Friendly	Villa Dálmine	1–1	Deportivo Morón	Campana, Argentina
	G. Águila	Deportivo Morón; Grupo La Provincia; 60 min. match	A. Lavezzi (pen.)	Stadium: Estadio El Coliseo de Mitre y Puccini

20 July 2019 Friendly	Deportivo Morón	1–1	Tigre	Ezeiza, Argentina
	N. Ramírez (pen.)	Deportivo Morón; Grupo La Provincia; 70 min. match	J. Mosquera	Stadium: Complejo Deportivo de Ezeiza; Attendance: 0 (Note: Behind closed doors.)

20 July 2019 Friendly	Deportivo Morón	4–1	Tigre	Ezeiza, Argentina
	A. Lavezzi; D. Akerman; F. Cardozo (o.g.); N. Vergara	Deportivo Morón; Grupo La Provincia; 70 min. match	E. Dening	Stadium: Complejo Deportivo de Ezeiza; Attendance: 0 (Note: Behind closed doors.)

27 July 2019 Friendly	Deportivo Morón	Cancelled	Colegiales	Morón, Argentina
		Deportivo Morón		Stadium: Estadio Nuevo Francisco Urbano

2 August 2019 Friendly	Deportivo Morón	0–2	Agropecuario	Morón, Argentina
11:00 GMT-3		Grupo La Provincia	E. Narese; A. Gagliardi	Stadium: Estadio Nuevo Francisco Urbano

2 August 2019 Friendly	Deportivo Morón	2–1	Agropecuario	Morón, Argentina
	V. Perales; J. D'Angelo	Grupo La Provincia	F. Pérez	Stadium: Estadio Nuevo Francisco Urbano

7 August 2019 Friendly	Deportivo Morón	5–0	Puerto Nuevo	Morón, Argentina
15:00 GMT-3	K. Gissi; F. Alvarenga	Deportivo Morón; Grupo La Provincia		Stadium: Estadio Nuevo Francisco Urbano

7 August 2019 Friendly	Deportivo Morón	1–0	Puerto Nuevo	Morón, Argentina
	E. Ciaccheri	Deportivo Morón; Grupo La Provincia		Stadium: Estadio Nuevo Francisco Urbano

10 August 2019 Friendly	Deportivo Morón	Cancelled	Sportivo Barracas	Morón, Argentina
		Deportivo Morón		Stadium: Estadio Nuevo Francisco Urbano

== Competitions ==
=== Primera B Nacional ===
==== Results summary ====
Overall								Home						Away					
Pld	W	D	L	GF	GA	GD	Pts	W	D	L	GF	GA	GD	W	D	L	GF	GA	GD
3	2	1	0	5	2	+3	7	1	0	0	1	0	+1	1	1	0	4	2	+2

Last updated: 30 August 2019.
Source: Soccerway

==== Matches ====
The fixtures for the 2019–20 league season were announced on 1 August 2019, with a new format of split zones being introduced. Deportivo Morón were drawn in Zone A.

Win Draw Loss

19 August 2019 1	Nueva Chicago	0–0	Deportivo Morón	Buenos Aires, Argentina
15:35 GMT-3		Deportivo Morón; La Voz del Interior; Soccerway		Stadium: Estadio Nueva Chicago; Referee: Fabricio Llobet (Argentina)

24 August 2019 2	Deportivo Morón	1–0	Guillermo Brown	Morón, Argentina
15:30 GMT-3	E. Ciaccheri 82'	Deportivo Morón; EL CHUBUT; Soccerway		Stadium: Estadio Nuevo Francisco Urbano; Referee: Andrés Gareano (Argentina)

29 August 2019 3	Alvarado	2–4	Deportivo Morón	Mar del Plata, Argentina
19:15 GMT-3	G. Rivero 9', 64'	Deportivo Morón; QUÉ DIGITAL; Soccerway	K. Gissi 50'; F. Alvarenga 61'; M. Alonso 74', 90+2'	Stadium: Estadio José María Minella; Referee: Nazareno Arasa (Argentina)

4	Deportivo Morón	–	Belgrano	Morón, Argentina
				Stadium: Estadio Nuevo Francisco Urbano

== Squad statistics ==
=== Appearances and goals ===
No.	Pos.	Nationality	Name	League		Cup		League Cup		Continental		Other		Total		Discipline		Ref
No.	Pos.	Nationality	Name	Apps	Goals	Apps	Goals	Apps	Goals	Apps	Goals	Apps	Goals	Apps	Goals	Yellow card	Red card	Ref
–	GK	Argentina	Bruno Galván	0	0	—		—		—		0	0	0	0	0	0	
–	GK	Argentina	Franco Ravizzoli	0	0	—		—		—		0	0	0	0	0	0	
–	GK	Argentina	Franco Rojas	0	0	—		—		—		0	0	0	0	0	0	
–	GK	Argentina	Julio Salvá	3	0	—		—		—		0	0	3	0	0	0	
–	RB	Argentina	Fabricio Alvarenga	3	1	—		—		—		0	0	3	1	0	0	
–	DF	Argentina	Mariano Bracamonte	0	0	—		—		—		0	0	0	0	0	0	
–	DF	Argentina	Cristian Broggi	3	0	—		—		—		0	0	3	0	1	0	
–	CB	Argentina	Juan Celaya	0	0	—		—		—		0	0	0	0	0	0	
–	RB	Argentina	Matías Cortave	3	0	—		—		—		0	0	3	0	0	0	
–	CB	Argentina	Manuel Guiñazú	0	0	—		—		—		0	0	0	0	0	0	
–	LB	Argentina	Luciano Lapetina	0	0	—		—		—		0	0	0	0	0	0	
–	LB	Argentina	Nicolás Martínez	3	0	—		—		—		0	0	3	0	2	0	
–	DF	Argentina	Emiliano Mayola	3	0	—		—		—		0	0	3	0	2	0	
–	CB	Argentina	Francisco Oliver	0(1)	0	—		—		—		0	0	0(1)	0	0	0	
–	CB	Argentina	Valentín Perales	0	0	—		—		—		0	0	0	0	0	0	
–	MF	Argentina	Iván Álvarez	0	0	—		—		—		0	0	0	0	0	0	
–	DM	Argentina	Gonzalo Baglivo	0	0	—		—		—		0	0	0	0	0	0	
–	AM	Argentina	José D'Angelo	0(1)	0	—		—		—		0	0	0(1)	0	0	0	
–	CM	Argentina	Dylan Glaby	0	0	—		—		—		0	0	0	0	0	0	
–	MF	Argentina	Matías Guayaré	0	0	—		—		—		0	0	0	0	0	0	
–	MF	Argentina	Agustín Lavezzi	0	0	—		—		—		0	0	0	0	0	0	
–	MF	Argentina	Cristian Lillo	0(1)	0	—		—		—		0	0	0(1)	0	0	0	
–	MF	Argentina	Gerardo Martínez	0	0	—		—		—		0	0	0	0	0	0	
–	AM	Argentina	Matías Pardo	0	0	—		—		—		0	0	0	0	0	0	
–	CM	Argentina	Matías Nizzo	3	0	—		—		—		0	0	3	0	1	0	
–	DM	Argentina	Lucas Pérez Godoy	3	0	—		—		—		0	0	3	0	1	0	
–	DM	Argentina	Federico Prada	0	0	—		—		—		0	0	0	0	0	0	
–	LW	Argentina	Nicolás Ramírez	2	0	—		—		—		0	0	2	0	0	0	
–	LM	Argentina	Diego Tonetto	1(2)	0	—		—		—		0	0	1(2)	0	0	0	
–	MF	Argentina	Nisim Vergara	0	0	—		—		—		0	0	0	0	0	0	
–	FW	Argentina	Damián Akerman	0(1)	0	—		—		—		0(1)	0	0	0	0	0	
–	FW	Uruguay	Mauricio Alonso	3	2	—		—		—		0	0	3	2	0	0	
–	LW	Argentina	Lucas Chacana	0	0	—		—		—		0	0	0	0	0	0	
–	CF	Argentina	Diego Cháves	0	0	—		—		—		0	0	0	0	0	0	
–	FW	Argentina	Esteban Ciaccheri	1(1)	1	—		—		—		0	0	1(1)	1	0	0	
–	CF	Switzerland	Kevin Gissi	2(1)	1	—		—		—		0	0	2(1)	1	1	0	
–	CF	Argentina	Lucas Poletto	0	0	—		—		—		0	0	0	0	0	0	
Own goals				—	0	—		—		—		—	0	—	0	—	—	—

Statistics accurate as of 30 August 2019.

=== Goalscorers ===
Rank	Pos	No.	Nat	Name	League	Cup	League Cup	Continental	Other	Total	Ref
1	FW	–	Uruguay	Mauricio Alonso	2	—	—	—	0	2	
2	FW	–	Argentina	Esteban Ciaccheri	1	—	—	—	0	1	
2	CF	–	Switzerland	Kevin Gissi	1	—	—	—	0	1	
2	RB	–	Argentina	Fabricio Alvarenga	1	—	—	—	0	1	
Own goals					0	—	—	—	0	0	
Totals					5	—	—	—	0	5	—
