= Lavezzi (surname) =

Lavezzi (pronounced [laˈvettsi]) is a Northern Italian surname. Notable people with the surname include:

- Agustín Lavezzi (born 1996), Argentine footballer
- Ezequiel Lavezzi (born 1985), Argentine footballer
- Mario Lavezzi (born 1948), Italian singer-songwriter, musician and record producer
