= Toneatto =

Toneatto is an Italian surname. Notable people with the surname include:

- Lauro Toneatto (1933–2010), Italian footballer and coach
- Tony Toneatto (fl. 1987), Canadian psychologist

== See also ==
- Tonetto
