= Gissi (surname) =

Gissi is a surname. Notable people with the surname include:

- Dylan Gissi (born 1991), Swiss footballer
- Kevin Gissi (born 1992), Swiss footballer, brother of Dylan
