= Juan Celaya =

Juan Celaya may refer to:

- Juan Celaya (footballer)
- Juan Celaya (diver)
