= Nicolás Ramírez =

Nicolás Ramírez may refer to:

- Nicolás Ramírez (Mexican footballer) (born 1974), Mexican former football defensive midfielder
- Nicolás Ramírez (Argentine footballer) (born 1988), Argentine football forward for Deportivo Camioneros
- Nicolás Ramírez (Chilean footballer) (born 1997), Chilean football centre-back for Huachipato
- Nicolás Ramírez (referee), Argentine football referee

== See also ==
- Nick Ramirez (Nicholas Randolph Ramirez, born 1989), American baseball pitcher
