= Iván Álvarez =

Iván Álvarez may refer to:

- Iván Álvarez (cyclist) (born 1981), Spanish cyclist
- Iván Álvarez (footballer, born 1980), Chilean forward
- Iván Álvarez (footballer, born 2000), Argentine midfielder
