= Gerardo Martínez =

Gerardo Martínez may refer to:

- Gerardo Martínez (athlete) (born 1979), Mexican high jumper
- Gerardo Martínez (footballer) (born 1991), Argentine footballer
- Gerardo Martínez (tennis) (born 1969), Mexican tennis player
