= Bontempo =

Bontempo is a surname. Notable people with the surname include:

- João Domingos Bomtempo (1775–1842), Portuguese composer
- Leonel Bontempo (born 1992), Argentine footballer
- Salvatore A. Bontempo (1909–1989), American politician
