= Federico Prada =

Argentine professional footballer

Daniel Prada
Personal information
- Full name: Daniel Prada
- Date of birth: 23 February 1993 (age 33)
- Place of birth: Buenos Aires, Argentina
- Position: Midfielder

Team information
- Current team: Los Andes

Youth career
- Sportivo Italiano
- Boca Juniors
- All Boys
- Atlanta

Senior career*
Years	Team	Apps	(Gls)
- FC Locarno
- Trezzano
- Llagostera
- Fundación Leo Messi
2014	Mazagón		
2014–2015	San Roque	19	(0)
2015–2016	Atlético Benamiel	20	(0)
2016	Marsala		
2017	Eldense	1	(0)
2017–2018	Sacachispas	0	(0)
2018–2019	Deportivo Morón	1	(0)
2019	San Miguel		
2020	ASD Policoro		
2021–	Los Andes	0	(0)
- * Club domestic league appearances and goals as of 19:33, 31 January 2021 (UTC)

Daniel Prada (born 23 February 1993) is an Argentine professional footballer who plays as a midfielder for Los Andes.

== Career ==
Prada started in the youth ranks of Sportivo Italiano, prior to having periods in the academies of Boca Juniors, All Boys and Atlanta. Prada began his senior career in Swiss football with FC Locarno, which was followed by spells in Italy with Trezzano and in Spain with Llagostera. In 2014, after a stint with Fundación Leo Messi, Prada moved to Spanish outfit Mazagón. Later that year, Prada joined Primera Andaluza side San Roque. His debut arrived in a win away to his ex-club Mazagón in September, on the way to nineteen total appearances. Prada moved across the division for the 2015–16 campaign, signing for Atlético Benamiel.

After featuring twenty times for Atlético Benamiel, Prada switched Spain for a return to Italy having agreed terms with Marsala in 2016. On 25 January 2017, Prada joined Segunda División B side Eldense. He appeared against Ebro on 29 January, but was released soon after. Prada headed back to his homeland later that year to join Sacachispas, though didn't appear competitively despite remaining until June 2018. Deportivo Morón became Prada's eleventh senior club on 3 July. His bow came in a Primera B Nacional fixture with Los Andes in the succeeding April. In summer 2019, Prada joined San Miguel.

In early 2020, Parada moved back to Italian football with Eccellenza Basilicata club ASD Policoro. On 22 December 2020, Prada signed with Primera B Metropolitana team Los Andes in Argentina.

== Career statistics ==
As of 31 January 2021.

Appearances and goals by club, season and competition
Club	Season	League			Cup		League Cup		Continental		Other		Total	
Club	Season	Division	Apps	Goals	Apps	Goals	Apps	Goals	Apps	Goals	Apps	Goals	Apps	Goals
San Roque	2014–15	Primera Andaluza	19	0	0	0	—		—		0	0	19	0
Atlético Benamiel	2015–16	Primera Andaluza	20	0	0	0	—		—		0	0	20	0
Eldense	2016–17	Segunda División B	1	0	0	0	0	0	—		0	0	1	0
Sacachispas	2017–18	Primera B Metropolitana	0	0	0	0	—		—		0	0	0	0
Deportivo Morón	2018–19	Primera B Nacional	1	0	0	0	—		—		0	0	1	0
Los Andes	2021	Primera B Metropolitana	0	0	0	0	—		—		0	0	0	0
Career total			41	0	0	0	0	0	—		0	0	41	0
