= Julio Salvá =

Argentine footballer

Personal information
- Full name: Julio César Salvá
- Date of birth: 18 May 1987 (age 39)
- Place of birth: Tres Lomas, Argentina
- Height: 1.88 m (6 ft 2 in)
- Position: Goalkeeper

Team information
- Current team: Deportivo Morón

Youth career
- 2005–2008: Quilmes

Senior career*
| Years | Team | Apps | (Gls) |
| 2008–2013 | Estudiantes | 35 | (0) |
| 2011 | → Once Tigres (loan) | | |
| 2012 | → JJ Urquiza (loan) | 0 | (0) |
| 2013–2017 | Acassuso | 116 | (0) |
| 2017–2021 | Deportivo Morón | 35 | (0) |
| 2021–2022 | Güemes | 34 | (0) |
| 2022–2023 | Atlético de Rafaela | 35 | (0) |
| 2023–2025 | Patronato | 70 | (0) |
| 2025– | Deportivo Morón | 37 | (0) |
- * Club domestic league appearances and goals as of 17:30, 27 April 2026 (UTC)

Julio César Salvá (born 18 May 1987) is an Argentine professional footballer who plays as a goalkeeper for Deportivo Morón.

== Career ==
Salvá started his career with Quilmes's academy. He departed to join Primera B Metropolitana's Estudiantes in 2008. Thirty-five league appearances followed, with his final game coming against Villa Dálmine on 2 March 2013. During his time with Estudiantes, Salvá was loaned out on two occasions - to Once Tigres in 2011 and to Justo José de Urquiza in 2012. In June 2013, Salvá was signed by Acassuso. He remained with the third tier team for five seasons, participating in a total of one hundred and nineteen matches. Salvá joined Primera B Nacional side Deportivo Morón in 2017. In February 2021, Salvá left Morón to join fellow league club Güemes.

Ahead of the 2022 season, Salvá signed with Atlético de Rafaela.

== Career statistics ==
As of 18 December 2018.

Club statistics
| Club | Season | League | | | Cup (Note: Includes the Copa Argentina) | | League Cup | | Continental | | Other | | Total | |
| Club | Season | Division | Apps | Goals | Apps | Goals | Apps | Goals | Apps | Goals | Apps | Goals | Apps | Goals |
|---|---|---|---|---|---|---|---|---|---|---|---|---|---|---|
| Estudiantes | 2012–13 | Primera B Metropolitana | 1 | 0 | 0 | 0 | — | | — | | 0 | 0 | 1 | 0 |
| Justo José de Urquiza (loan) | 2012–13 | Primera C Metropolitana | 0 | 0 | 0 | 0 | — | | — | | 0 | 0 | 0 | 0 |
| Acassuso | 2013–14 | Primera B Metropolitana | 3 | 0 | 2 | 0 | — | | — | | 0 | 0 | 5 | 0 |
| Acassuso | 2014 | Primera B Metropolitana | 20 | 0 | 0 | 0 | — | | — | | 1 (Note: One appearance in the 2014 Primera B Metropolitana play-offs) | 0 | 21 | 0 |
| Acassuso | 2015 | Primera B Metropolitana | 38 | 0 | 0 | 0 | — | | — | | 0 | 0 | 38 | 0 |
| Acassuso | 2016 | Primera B Metropolitana | 19 | 0 | 0 | 0 | — | | — | | 0 | 0 | 19 | 0 |
| Acassuso | 2016–17 | Primera B Metropolitana | 36 | 0 | 0 | 0 | — | | — | | 0 | 0 | 36 | 0 |
| Acassuso | Total | | 116 | 0 | 2 | 0 | — | | — | | 1 | 0 | 119 | 0 |
| Deportivo Morón | 2017–18 | Primera B Nacional | 1 | 0 | 4 | 0 | — | | — | | 0 | 0 | 5 | 0 |
| Deportivo Morón | 2018–19 | Primera B Nacional | 5 | 0 | 1 | 0 | — | | — | | 0 | 0 | 6 | 0 |
| Deportivo Morón | Total | | 6 | 0 | 5 | 0 | — | | — | | 0 | 0 | 11 | 0 |
| Career total | | | 123 | 0 | 7 | 0 | — | | — | | 1 | 0 | 131 | 0 |
