= Luciano Lapetina =

Argentine footballer

Personal information
- Date of birth: 10 February 1996 (age 30)
- Place of birth: Argentina
- Height: 1.73 m (5 ft 8 in)
- Position: Left-back

Team information
- Current team: Olimpo

Youth career
- Godoy Cruz

Senior career*
| Years | Team | Apps | (Gls) |
| 2017–2018 | Godoy Cruz | 0 | (0) |
| 2018–2019 | Deportivo Morón | 10 | (0) |
| 2019–2021 | Sportivo Las Parejas | 33 | (0) |
| 2021–2024 | Sarmiento de Resistencia | 62 | (2) |
| 2024 | Estudiantes RC | 4 | (0) |
| 2024–2025 | Chaco For Ever | 14 | (0) |
| 2025–2026 | Ciudad Bolívar | 26 | (4) |
| 2026– | Olimpo | 3 | (0) |
- * Club domestic league appearances and goals as of 16:30, 14 April 2026 (UTC)

Luciano Lapetina (born 10 February 1996) is an Argentine professional footballer who plays as a left-back for Club Olimpo in the Torneo Federal A of Argentina.

== Career ==
Lapetina's career began with Argentine Primera División side Godoy Cruz. He was an unused substitute two times for the club, once in the 2016–17 campaign against Newell's Old Boys and once in 2017–18 versus Racing Club. In June 2018, Lapetina joined Primera B Nacional side Deportivo Morón. His professional debut arrived on 4 November during a 1–1 draw away to Gimnasia y Esgrima. Lapetina signed for Torneo Federal A's Sportivo Las Parejas in August 2019. At the end of December 2021, Lapetina joined Sarmiento de Resistencia. After passing through Estudiantes (Río Cuarto), Chaco For Ever, and Ciudad Bolívar, In 2026 he became a player for Club Olimpo.

== Career statistics ==
As of 4 October 2020.

Club statistics
| Club | Season | League | | | Cup | | League Cup | | Continental | | Other | | Total | |
| Club | Season | Division | Apps | Goals | Apps | Goals | Apps | Goals | Apps | Goals | Apps | Goals | Apps | Goals |
|---|---|---|---|---|---|---|---|---|---|---|---|---|---|---|
| Godoy Cruz | 2016–17 | Primera División | 0 | 0 | 0 | 0 | — | | — | | 0 | 0 | 0 | 0 |
| Godoy Cruz | 2017–18 | Primera División | 0 | 0 | 0 | 0 | — | | — | | 0 | 0 | 0 | 0 |
| Godoy Cruz | Total | | 0 | 0 | 0 | 0 | — | | — | | 0 | 0 | 0 | 0 |
| Deportivo Morón | 2018–19 | Primera B Nacional | 10 | 0 | 0 | 0 | — | | — | | 0 | 0 | 10 | 0 |
| Sportivo Las Parejas | 2019–20 | Torneo Federal A | 11 | 0 | 2 | 0 | — | | — | | 0 | 0 | 13 | 0 |
| Independiente Rivadavia | 2020–21 | Primera B Nacional | 0 | 0 | 0 | 0 | — | | — | | 0 | 0 | 0 | 0 |
| Career total | | | 21 | 0 | 2 | 0 | — | | — | | 0 | 0 | 23 | 0 |
