= Damián Akerman =

Argentine footballer (born 1980)

Personal information
- Full name: Damián Emilio Akerman
- Date of birth: March 25, 1980 (age 46)
- Place of birth: Morteros, Argentina
- Height: 1.70 m (5 ft 7 in)
- Position: Striker

Team information
- Current team: Gimnasia (Mendoza)

Youth career
- Newell's Old Boys

Senior career*
Years	Team	Apps	(Gls)
2000–2002	Argentino (R)	57	(11)
2003	La Serena	0	(0)
2003–2004	Deportivo Morón	173 total	(72)
2005	→ Gimnasia LP (loan)	4	(0)
2005–2006	Deportivo Morón	(see above)	
2006–2007	→ Ferro Carril Oeste (loan)	39	(12)
2007–2009	Deportivo Morón	(see above)	
2009–2010	→ Blooming (loan)	28	(12)
2010–2014	Deportivo Morón	142	(69)
2015–	Gimnasia (Mendoza)	17	(1)
- * Club domestic league appearances and goals as of June 10, 2011

Damián Emilio Akerman (born March 25, 1980, in Morteros, Córdoba Province) is an Argentinian football striker, who currently plays for Deportivo Morón in the Primera B Nacional.

Nicknamed "El Cabro", Akerman began at the youth sector of Newell's Old Boys football club. He made his debut in 2000, with Argentino de Rosario in the Metropolitan Primera B. In 2003, he relocated to Chile, to play for the first division club Deportes La Serena, but after five months he returned to Argentina and signed with Deportivo Morón, the team which he would eventually spend most of his career with.

After four stints at Morón, Akerman became the all-time leading scorer in the club's history, with 141 goals altogether in both second and third division teams. He also had a brief spell in the Argentine First Division with Gimnasia de La Plata in 2005. Furthermore, he spent some time with Ferro Carril Oeste, between 2006 and 2007. In July 2009, Akerman was loaned to Bolivian side Blooming. He made his debut in the Liga de Fútbol Profesional Boliviano tournament on August 8, 2009, against Nacional Potosí. With the help of his goals in crucial games, Blooming obtained the 2009 Clausura title, the first in his career on the team. After a year in Bolivia, Akerman returned to Morón once again.

== Club titles ==
Season	Club	Title
2009 (C)	Blooming	Liga de Fútbol Profesional Boliviano
