= Lucas Pérez Godoy =

Argentine footballer

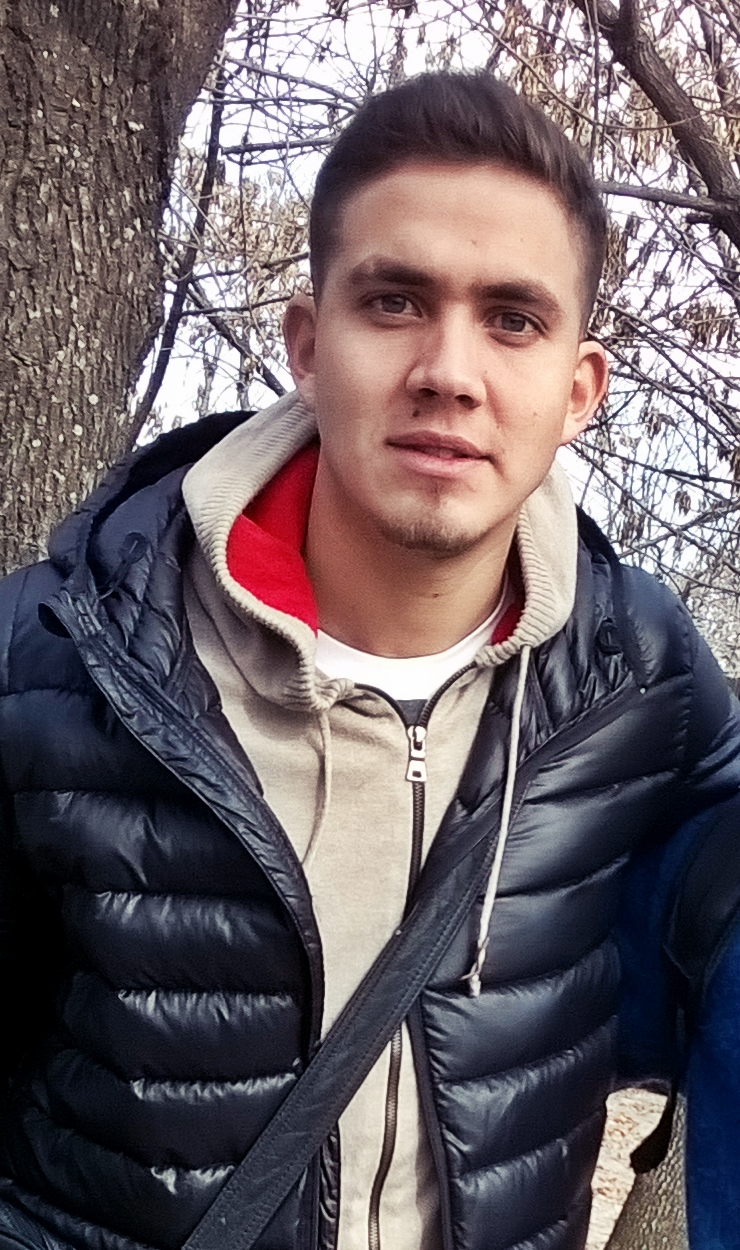

Personal information
- Full name: Lucas Emmanuel Pérez Godoy
- Date of birth: 30 June 1993 (age 33)
- Place of birth: Lomas de Zamora, Argentina
- Height: 1.73 m (5 ft 8 in)
- Position: Midfielder

Team information
- Current team: Deportivo Madryn

Youth career
- Quilmes

Senior career*
Years	Team	Apps	(Gls)
2013–2016	Quilmes	54	(3)
2016–2017	Sarmiento	10	(1)
2017	Brown	2	(0)
2018	UAI Urquiza	9	(0)
2018–2019	Mitre	17	(0)
2019–2020	Deportivo Morón	13	(1)
2020–2021	Chacarita Juniors	14	(0)
2021	Gimnasia Jujuy	11	(0)
2022	Atlanta	8	(0)
2022–	Deportivo Madryn	6	(0)
- * Club domestic league appearances and goals as of 20:18, 10 July 2022 (UTC)

Lucas Emmanuel Pérez Godoy (born 30 June 1993) is an Argentine professional footballer who plays as a midfielder for Deportivo Madryn.

== Career ==
Pérez Godoy began his career with Quilmes. After making his senior debut on 5 March 2013 in the Copa Argentina against Ferrocarril Midland, Pérez Godoy went on to score against River Plate and Gimnasia y Esgrima (LP) across twenty-nine appearances in the 2013–14 Argentine Primera División. He stayed for three more seasons, featuring a total of sixty-one times for the club whilst scoring three goals. Fellow top-flight team Sarmiento signed Pérez Godoy on 24 August 2016. One goal, in April 2017 versus River Plate, in ten games came in 2016–17. Pérez Godoy spent six months with Primera B Nacional side Brown to end 2017.

On 24 January 2018, Pérez Godoy joined UAI Urquiza of Primera B Metropolitana. Twelve appearances followed. Six months after joining, Pérez Godoy departed to seal a return to Primera B Nacional with Mitre in June. His bow for them arrived on 26 August during a victory away to Platense. Spells with Deportivo Morón, in July 2019, and Chacarita Juniors, in August 2020, occurred across the following few years; the latter came after a move to Gimnasia y Esgrima (M) fell through.

== Career statistics ==
As of 2 October 2020.

Club statistics
Club	Season	League			Cup		League Cup		Continental		Other		Total	
Club	Season	Division	Apps	Goals	Apps	Goals	Apps	Goals	Apps	Goals	Apps	Goals	Apps	Goals
Quilmes	2012–13	Primera División	0	0	1	0	—		—		0	0	1	0
Quilmes	2013–14	Primera División	28	2	1	0	—		—		0	0	29	2
Quilmes	2014	Primera División	4	0	1	0	—		—		0	0	5	0
Quilmes	2015	Primera División	14	1	3	0	—		—		1 (Note: Appearance(s) in the Primera División play-offs)	0	18	1
Quilmes	2016	Primera División	8	0	0	0	—		—		0	0	8	0
Quilmes	Total		54	3	6	0	—		—		1	0	61	3
Sarmiento	2016–17	Primera División	10	1	0	0	—		—		0	0	10	1
Brown	2017–18	Primera B Nacional	2	0	0	0	—		—		0	0	2	0
UAI Urquiza	2017–18	Primera B Metropolitana	9	0	0	0	—		—		3 (Note: Appearance(s) in the Primera B Metropolitana play-offs)	0	12	0
Mitre	2018–19	Primera B Nacional	17	0	0	0	—		—		0	0	17	0
Deportivo Morón	2019–20	Primera B Nacional	13	1	0	0	—		—		0	0	13	1
Chacarita Juniors	2020–21	Primera B Nacional	0	0	0	0	—		—		0	0	0	0
Career total			105	5	6	0	—		—		4	0	115	5
