= Valentín Perales =

Argentine footballer

Personal information
- Full name: Valentín Perales
- Date of birth: 2 August 1995 (age 31)
- Place of birth: Cipolletti, Argentina
- Height: 1.85 m (6 ft 1 in)
- Position: Centre-back

Team information
- Current team: Unión San Felipe
- Number: 2

Youth career
- Cipolletti

Senior career*
Years	Team	Apps	(Gls)
2012–2013	Cipolletti	18	(1)
2013–2016	San Lorenzo	0	(0)
2015	→ Cipolletti (loan)	26	(1)
2016–2019	Deportivo Morón	49	(2)
2020–2021	Atlanta	25	(0)
2022	Independiente Rivadavia	30	(3)
2023	Deportivo Madryn	25	(0)
2024	Estudiantes BA	27	(0)
2025	Racing de Córdoba	17	(0)
2026–	Unión San Felipe	1	(0)
- * Club domestic league appearances and goals as of 23 February 2026

Valentín Perales (born 2 August 1995) is an Argentine professional footballer who plays as a centre-back for Chilean club Unión San Felipe.

== Career ==
Perales began in Cipolletti's ranks, the defender featured eighteen times in the 2012–13 Torneo Argentino A; his debut came on 26 August 2012 against Defensores de Belgrano, while he also scored his first goal in a game with Santamarina on 25 November. At the end of 2012–13, Perales was signed by Argentine Primera División side San Lorenzo. In February 2015, after no appearances, Perales rejoined Cipolletti on loan. One goal in thirty-two games followed. On 7 July 2016, Perales joined Deportivo Morón of Primera B Metropolitana. He scored in their final match of their promotion-winning season of 2016–17 versus Deportivo Riestra.

In December 2025, Perales moved to Chile and signed with Unión San Felipe.

== Career statistics ==
As of 19 December 2018.

Club statistics
Club	Season	League			Cup (Note: Includes the Copa Argentina)		League Cup		Continental (Note: Includes the Copa Libertadores and Copa Sudamericana)		Other		Total	
Club	Season	Division	Apps	Goals	Apps	Goals	Apps	Goals	Apps	Goals	Apps	Goals	Apps	Goals
Cipolletti	2012–13	Torneo Argentino A	18	1	0	0	—		—		0	0	18	1
San Lorenzo	2013–14	Primera División	0	0	0	0	—		0	0	0	0	0	0
San Lorenzo	2014	Primera División	0	0	0	0	—		—		0	0	0	0
San Lorenzo	2015	Primera División	0	0	0	0	—		0	0	0	0	0	0
San Lorenzo	2016	Primera División	0	0	0	0	—		0	0	0	0	0	0
San Lorenzo	Total		0	0	0	0	—		0	0	0	0	0	0
Cipolletti (loan)	2015	Torneo Federal A	26	1	0	0	—		—		6 (Note: Six appearances in the 2015 Torneo Federal A play-offs)	0	32	1
Deportivo Morón	2016–17	Primera B Metropolitana	9	1	1	1	—		—		0	0	10	2
Deportivo Morón	2017–18	Primera B Nacional	18	1	2	0	—		—		0	0	20	1
Deportivo Morón	2018–19	Primera B Nacional	2	0	0	0	—		—		0	0	2	0
Deportivo Morón	Total		29	2	3	1	—		—		0	0	32	3
Career total			73	4	3	1	—		0	0	6	0	82	5

== Honours ==
Deportivo Morón

- Primera B Metropolitana: 2016–17
