= Javier Bayk =

Argentine footballer (born 1994)

Personal information
- Full name: Javier Mauricio Bayk
- Date of birth: 2 February 1994 (age 32)
- Place of birth: Argentina
- Height: 1.71 m (5 ft 7 in)
- Position: Midfielder

Team information
- Current team: Deportivo Morón

Youth career
- Atlético Concepción

Senior career*
Years	Team	Apps	(Gls)
2015	Bella Vista	7	(0)
2016–2017	Bokelj	23	(0)
2017	Iskra Danilovgrad	6	(0)
2018	Rudar	6	(0)
2018	San Jorge	13	(5)
2019–2021	Deportes La Serena	23	(1)
2020	→ Deportes Santa Cruz	12	(0)
2021	Güemes	16	(3)
2022	San Luis	10	(1)
2022–	Deportivo Morón	3	(0)
- * Club domestic league appearances and goals as of 19:00, 14 July 2022 (UTC)

Javier Mauricio Bayk (born 2 February 1994) is an Argentine footballer who plays as a midfielder for CSYD Flandria.

== Career ==
Bayk started his career with Argentine fourth division side Bella Vista (Bahía Blanca).

In 2016, he signed for Bokelj in Montenegro after trialing for Italian second division club Trapani.

Before the 2019 season, Bayk signed for La Serena in Chile after playing for Argentine third division team San Jorge.

Before the 2021 season, he signed for Güemes in the Argentine second division.

The 2021 season, he signed for San Luis de Quillota in the Chilean second division.
