= Nisim Vergara =

Argentine footballer

Personal information
- Date of birth: 1 August 1998 (age 28)
- Place of birth: Argentina
- Position: Midfielder

Team information
- Current team: Atlas

Senior career*
Years	Team	Apps	(Gls)
2018–2020	Deportivo Morón	4	(0)
2020–2021	Santamarina	1	(0)
2021	Fénix de Pilar	14	(0)
2023	UAI Urquiza	0	(0)
2024-	Atlas	0	(0)
- * Club domestic league appearances and goals as of 18:19, 14 July 2022 (UTC)

Nisim Vergara (born 1 August 1998) is an Argentine professional footballer who plays as a midfielder.

== Career ==
Vergara began his career with Deportivo Morón. He was moved into their first-team squad during the 2017–18 Primera B Nacional campaign, though failed to make an appearance but was on the substitutes bench for fixtures with All Boys, Sarmiento, Villa Dálmine and Gimnasia y Esgrima (J). Vergara's professional debut arrived in the following season, with the midfielder appearing for the final five minutes of a scoreless draw versus Gimnasia y Esgrima (M) on 24 September 2018.

== Career statistics ==
As of 22 December 2018.

Club statistics
Club	Season	League			Cup (Note: Includes the Copa Argentina)		League Cup		Continental		Other		Total	
Club	Season	Division	Apps	Goals	Apps	Goals	Apps	Goals	Apps	Goals	Apps	Goals	Apps	Goals
Deportivo Morón	2017–18	Primera B Nacional	0	0	0	0	—		—		0	0	0	0
Deportivo Morón	2018–19	Primera B Nacional	3	0	0	0	—		—		0	0	3	0
Career total			3	0	0	0	—		—		0	0	3	0
