= Francisco Oliver =

Argentine footballer

Personal information
- Full name: Francisco Javier Oliver
- Date of birth: 30 May 1995 (age 31)
- Place of birth: Santa Fe, Argentina
- Height: 1.84 m (6 ft 0 in)
- Position: Centre-back

Team information
- Current team: Curicó Unido

Youth career
- Atlético de Rafaela

Senior career*
Years	Team	Apps	(Gls)
2016	Libertad de Sunchales	11	(0)
2016–2018	San Martín Tucumán	22	(0)
2018–2019	Santamarina	22	(2)
2019–2020	Deportivo Morón	7	(0)
2020–2021	Sarmiento	5	(0)
2021	Tigre	7	(0)
2022–2023	Belgrano	27	(1)
2024	Atlético Rafaela	30	(0)
2025–	Curicó Unido	23	(2)
- * Club domestic league appearances and goals as of 3 February 2026

Francisco Javier Oliver (born 30 May 1995) is an Argentine professional footballer who plays as a centre-back for Chilean club Curicó Unido.

== Career ==
Oliver's career started with Atlético de Rafaela, prior to him joining Torneo Federal A side Libertad. His debut came during a draw with Sportivo Las Parejas on 7 February 2016, which was the first of sixteen further appearances in 2016. In the following July, Oliver joined San Martín of Primera B Nacional. Twenty-two appearances subsequently arrived across two seasons, though just two during 2017–18 which San Martín ended with promotion to the Argentine Primera División. Oliver remained in the second tier, completing a move to Santamarina on 30 June 2018. He made his bow on 25 August as the club were defeated by Agropecuario.

In 2025, Oliver moved abroad and signed with Chilean club Curicó Unido. After leaving them at the end of the season, he rejoined them on 9 March 2026.

== Career statistics ==
As of 22 December 2018.

Club statistics
Club	Season	League			Cup (Note: Includes the Copa Argentina)		League Cup		Continental		Other		Total	
Club	Season	Division	Apps	Goals	Apps	Goals	Apps	Goals	Apps	Goals	Apps	Goals	Apps	Goals
Libertad	2016	Torneo Federal A	11	0	0	0	—		—		6 (Note: Six appearances in the 2016 Torneo Federal A play-offs)	0	17	0
San Martín	2016–17	Primera B Nacional	20	0	0	0	—		—		0	0	20	0
San Martín	2017–18	Primera B Nacional	2	0	0	0	—		—		0	0	2	0
San Martín	Total		22	0	0	0	—		—		0	0	22	0
Santamarina	2018–19	Primera B Nacional	11	0	0	0	—		—		0	0	11	0
Career total			44	0	0	0	—		—		6	0	50	0
