= José D'Angelo =

Argentine footballer (born 1989)

Personal information
- Full name: José Ezequiel D'Angelo
- Date of birth: 5 April 1989 (age 37)
- Place of birth: Quilmes Buenos Aires, Argentina
- Height: 1.88 m (6 ft 2 in)
- Position: Midfielder

Senior career*
Years	Team	Apps	(Gls)
2010–2011	Chacarita Juniors	22	(2)
2011	Central Español		
2012	Rangers	8	(0)
2012	Rangers B	5	(1)
2013	Bolívar	4	(0)
2013–2014	Comunicaciones	39	(3)
2015–2016	All Boys	10	(0)
2016	→ Gimnasia LP (loan)	1	(0)
2016	Olimpo	2	(0)
2017–2019	San Telmo	61	(4)
2019–2021	Deportivo Morón	21	(0)
2021	Estudiantes RC	4	(0)
2021–2022	Villa Dálmine	46	(2)
2023	San Telmo	19	(1)
2024	Sportivo Italiano	13	(0)
- * Club domestic league appearances and goals as of 9 October 2024

José Ezequiel D'Angelo (born 5 April 1989) is an Argentine professional footballer who plays as a midfielder. He last played for Sportivo Italiano.

== Career ==
D'Angelo was born in Quilmes Buenos Aires, Argentina. He trialled Manchester City in 2011.

== Teams ==
- (Argentina) Chacarita Juniors 2010–2011
- (Uruguay) Central Español 2011
- (Chile) Rangers 2012
- (Chile) Rangers B 2012
- (Bolivia) Bolívar 2013
- (Argentina) Comunicaciones 2013–2014
- (Argentina) All Boys 2015
- (Argentina) Gimnasia y Esgrima La Plata 2016
- (Argentina) Olimpo 2016–2017
- (Argentina) San Telmo 2017–2019
- (Argentina) Deportivo Morón 2019–2021
- (Argentina) Estudiantes de Río Cuarto 2021
- (Argentina) Villa Dálmine 2021–2022
- (Argentina) San Telmo 2023
- (Argentina) Sportivo Italiano 2024
