= Esteban Ciaccheri =

Argentine footballer (born 1991)

Personal information
- Date of birth: 20 May 1991 (age 35)
- Place of birth: Pilar, Argentina
- Height: 1.81 m (5 ft 11 in)
- Position: Forward

Senior career*
Years	Team	Apps	(Gls)
2012–2013	Rivadavia	31	(19)
2013–2018	Rangers de Talca	20	(5)
2014	→ Sarmiento (loan)	3	(0)
2015	→ Arsenal de Sarandí (loan)	1	(0)
2016	→ Juventud Unida Univ. (loan)	4	(0)
2016–2017	→ Rivadavia (loan)	31	(14)
2017	→ Botoșani (loan)	11	(0)
2018	→ Poli Timișoara (loan)	0	(0)
2018–2019	Flandria	28	(13)
2019–2020	Deportivo Morón	10	(2)
2020–2021	San Luis	17	(8)
- * Club domestic league appearances and goals as of 18:27, 14 July 2022 (UTC)

Esteban Ciaccheri (born 20 May 1991 in Argentina) is an Argentine footballer who plays as a forward.
