= Lucas Chacana =

Argentine footballer (born 1993)

Personal information
- Full name: Lucas Nicolás Chacana
- Date of birth: 16 June 1993 (age 33)
- Place of birth: San Miguel de Tucumán, Argentina
- Height: 1.78 m (5 ft 10 in)
- Position: Forward

Team information
- Current team: Universitatea Cluj
- Number: 7

Youth career
- San Martín Tucumán

Senior career*
Years	Team	Apps	(Gls)
2013–2016	San Martín Tucumán	69	(11)
2016–2017	Huracán	15	(1)
2017–2018	Tigre	3	(0)
2018	Atlético de Rafaela	2	(0)
2018–2019	Los Andes	21	(1)
2019	Deportivo Morón	6	(0)
2020–2021	Politehnica Iași	21	(1)
2021	Universitatea Cluj	4	(0)
- * Club domestic league appearances and goals as of 23:10, 8 May 2021 (UTC)

Lucas Nicolás Chacana (born 16 June 1993) is an Argentine professional footballer who plays as a forward.

== Career ==
Chacana's first club were San Martín of Torneo Argentino A, he featured eighty-three times and scored thirteen goals in four seasons with the club. In January 2016, Chacana joined Argentine Primera División side Huracán. He made his professional debut on 2 February in a Copa Libertadores first round win over Caracas. After two more appearances in continental competition against Atlético Nacional and Peñarol respectively, Chacana featured for the first time in the Primera División during a 4–2 victory over Temperley on 20 March. He scored his first Huracán goal in the league on 16 December against Talleres.

On 30 August 2017, Chacana was signed by fellow Primera División team Tigre. After just one start in three appearances, Chacana departed Tigre in January 2018 to sign for Atlético de Rafaela of Primera B Nacional. Five months later, Chacana joined Los Andes following only two matches for Rafaela. Ahead of 2019–20, Chacana signed with Deportivo Morón. Six appearances followed. January 2020 saw Chacana head abroad to Romania with Liga I side Politehnica Iași. He made his debut on 3 February against Viitorul Constanța, which was followed by his first goal on 27 June versus Chindia Târgoviște.

After twenty-four appearances for Politehnica Iași, Chacana agreed a transfer to Romania's Liga II with Universitatea Cluj on 11 January 2021.

== Career statistics ==
As of 8 May 2021.

Club statistics
Club	Season	League			Cup		League Cup		Continental		Other		Total	
Club	Season	Division	Apps	Goals	Apps	Goals	Apps	Goals	Apps	Goals	Apps	Goals	Apps	Goals
San Martín	2012–13	Torneo Argentino A	9	2	0	0	—		—		2 (Note: Appearance(s) in the Torneo Argentino A play-offs)	1	11	3
San Martín	2013–14	Torneo Argentino A	22	0	1	0	—		—		3	0	26	0
San Martín	2014	Torneo Federal A	8	0	3	1	—		—		0	0	11	1
San Martín	2015	Torneo Federal A	30	9	1	0	—		—		4 (Note: Appearance(s) in the Torneo Federal A play-offs)	0	35	9
San Martín	Total		69	11	5	1	—		—		9	1	83	13
Huracán	2016	Primera División	6	0	0	0	—		6 (Note: Appearance(s) in the Copa Libertadores)	0	0	0	12	0
Huracán	2016–17	Primera División	9	1	1	0	—		2 (Note: Appearance(s) in the Copa Sudamericana)	0	0	0	12	1
Huracán	Total		15	1	1	0	—		8	0	0	0	24	1
Tigre	2017–18	Primera División	3	0	0	0	—		—		0	0	3	0
Atlético de Rafaela	2017–18	Primera B Nacional	2	0	0	0	—		—		0	0	2	0
Los Andes	2018–19	Primera B Nacional	21	1	0	0	—		—		0	0	21	1
Deportivo Morón	2019–20	Primera B Nacional	6	0	0	0	—		—		0	0	6	0
Politehnica Iași	2019–20	Liga I	16	1	2	0	—		—		0	0	18	1
Politehnica Iași	2020–21	Liga I	5	0	1	0	—		—		0	0	6	0
Politehnica Iași	Total		21	1	3	0	—		—		0	0	24	1
Universitatea Cluj	2020–21	Liga II	4	0	1	0	—		—		0	0	5	0
Career total			141	14	10	1	—		8	0	9	1	169	16
