= Matías Cortave =

Argentine footballer

Personal information
- Full name: Matías Israel Cortave
- Date of birth: 27 June 1992 (age 34)
- Place of birth: Quilmes, Argentina
- Height: 1.90 m (6 ft 3 in)
- Position: Centre-back

Team information
- Current team: Almagro

Senior career*
Years	Team	Apps	(Gls)
2013–2016	Brown de Adrogué	27	(0)
2016–2017	Maccabi Herzliya	37	(0)
2017–2019	Brown	27	(0)
2019–2021	Deportivo Morón	26	(0)
2021–2022	Macará	29	(0)
2022–2023	Quilmes	16	(1)
2023–2025	Carlos Mannucci	49	(1)
2025–2026	Deportivo Morón	17	(0)
2026–	Almagro	9	(0)
- * Club domestic league appearances and goals as of 16:46, 22 April 2026 (UTC)

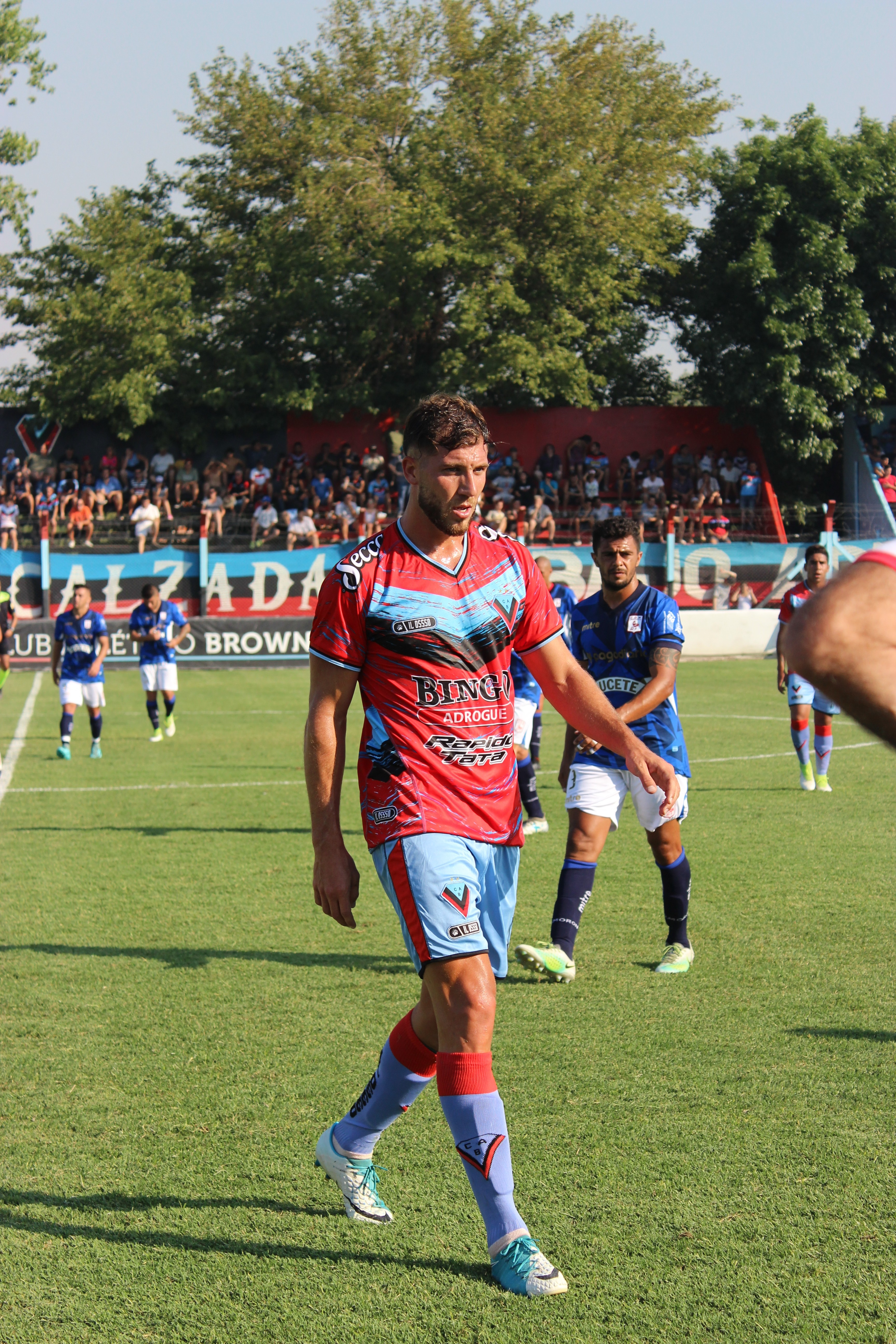
Cortave in 2018

Matías Israel Cortave (born 27 June 1992) is an Argentine professional footballer who plays as a centre-back for Almagro.

== Career ==
Cortave began his career in 2013 with Brown of Primera B Nacional. He was selected in nine matches, including for his professional debut on 8 November against Almirante Brown, during the 2013–14 campaign which ended with relegation to Primera B Metropolitana. Thirteen appearances followed across two seasons, with the latter three arriving in the club's title-winning campaign of 2015. On 19 July 2016, Cortave completed a move to Israel to join Liga Leumit side Maccabi Herzliya. He participated in thirty-seven matches, making his last appearance for them in May 2017 in a 2–0 defeat to Hapoel Nir Ramat HaSharon at Grundman Stadium.

September 2017 saw Cortave rejoin Primera B Nacional's Brown. He played a part in twenty fixtures in his first season back with the Adrogué club in 2017–18. Cortave left one season and twelve appearances later, as he agreed a move across the division to Deportivo Morón. He remained for two campaigns, featuring a total of twenty-six times. In January 2021, Cortave was announced as a new signing by Ecuadorian Serie A side Macará. At the end of January 2022, Cortave returned to his homeland again, when he signed with Quilmes.

== Career statistics ==
As of 26 April 2025.

Club	Division	Season	League		Cup		Continental		Total	
Club	Division	Season	Apps	Goals	Apps	Goals	Apps	Goals	Apps	Goals
Brown	Primera B Nacional	2013-14	9	0	2	0	—		11	0
Brown	Primera B Metropolitana	2014	10	0	0	0	—		10	0
Brown	Primera B Metropolitana	2015	3	0	0	0	—		3	0
Brown	Primera B Nacional	2016	2	0	0	0	—		2	0
Brown	Primera B Nacional	2017-18	20	0	2	0	—		22	0
Brown	Primera B Nacional	2018-19	10	0	2	0	—		12	0
Brown	Total		54	0	6	0	—		60	0
Maccabi Herzliya	Liga Leumit	2016-17	37	0	0	0	—		37	0
Deportivo Morón	Primera B Nacional	2019-20	21	0	—		—		21	0
Deportivo Morón	Primera B Nacional	2020	6	0	—		—		6	0
Deportivo Morón	Primera B Nacional	2025	5	0	—		—		5	0
Deportivo Morón	Total		32	0	—		—		32	0
Macará	Serie A	2021	29	0	—		2	0	31	0
Quilmes	Primera B Nacional	2022	16	1	4	0	—		20	1
Carlos A. Mannucci	Liga 1	2023	32	1	0	0	—		32	1
Carlos A. Mannucci	Liga 1	2024	16	0	0	0	—		16	0
Carlos A. Mannucci	Total		48	1	0	0	—		48	1
Career total			216	2	10	0	2	0	228	2

== Honours ==
Brown

- Primera B Metropolitana: 2015
