= Emiliano Mayola =

Argentine footballer

Personal information
- Full name: Emiliano Jonathan Iván Mayola
- Date of birth: 2 August 1987 (age 39)
- Place of birth: San Antonio de Padua, Argentina
- Height: 1.80 m (5 ft 11 in)
- Position: Centre-back

Team information
- Current team: Brown de Adrogué

Youth career
- Banfield

Senior career*
Years	Team	Apps	(Gls)
2006–2007	San Martín	0	(0)
2008	Gandzasar Kapan		
2009–2010	San Martín	0	(0)
2010–2011	Argentino	42	(5)
2011–2014	Flandria	74	(2)
2013–2014	→ Deportivo Morón (loan)	38	(1)
2014–2021	Deportivo Morón	181	(7)
2021	Defensores Belgrano	24	(0)
2022–	Brown de Adrogué	19	(1)
- * Club domestic league appearances and goals as of 19:08, 29 June 2022 (UTC)

Emiliano Jonathan Iván Mayola (born 2 August 1987) is an Argentine professional footballer who plays as a centre-back for Brown de Adrogué.

== Career ==
Mayola began with Banfield, prior to going to San Martín of Primera B Nacional in 2006. After no appearances in two years, Mayola left in 2008 to join Armenian Premier League side Gandzasar Kapan. A year later, the defender returned to Argentina after agreeing a move back to San Martín. Again, Mayola didn't feature for the club's first-team. Argentino of Primera C Metropolitana signed Mayola ahead of the 2010–11 campaign. Five goals in forty-two fixtures followed across the season. Mayola joined Primera B Metropolitana's Flandria in 2011. His first pro goal came on 30 April 2012 during a win versus Villa San Carlos.

After spending 2011–12 and 2012–13 with Flandria and making a total of seventy-six appearances whilst netting twice, Mayola was loaned to fellow third tier team Deportivo Morón. His first appearance arrived on 3 August 2013 against Los Andes, prior to his first goal coming in a 1–0 victory over Barracas Central on 27 August. Mayola was signed permanently on 30 June 2014, subsequently participating in one hundred and seventeen matches across four campaigns; with the last ending with promotion as champions to Primera B Nacional. After a lot years at Deportivo Morón, Mayola moved to Defensores de Belgrano in February 2021.

Ahead of the 2022 season, Mayola joined Brown de Adrogué.

== Career statistics ==
As of 19 December 2018.

Club statistics
Club	Season	League			Cup (Note: Includes the Copa Argentina)		League Cup		Continental		Other		Total	
Club	Season	Division	Apps	Goals	Apps	Goals	Apps	Goals	Apps	Goals	Apps	Goals	Apps	Goals
San Martín	2006–07	Primera B Nacional	0	0	0	0	—		—		0	0	0	0
San Martín	2007–08	Primera B Nacional	0	0	0	0	—		—		0	0	0	0
San Martín	2008–09	Primera División	0	0	0	0	—		—		0	0	0	0
San Martín	2009–10	Primera B Nacional	0	0	0	0	—		—		0	0	0	0
San Martín	Total		0	0	0	0	—		—		0	0	0	0
Argentino	2010–11	Primera C Metropolitana	0	0	0	0	—		—		0	0	0	0
Flandria	2011–12	Primera B Metropolitana	37	2	1	0	—		—		0	0	38	2
Flandria	2012–13	Primera B Metropolitana	37	0	1	0	—		—		0	0	38	0
Flandria	2013–14	Primera B Metropolitana	0	0	0	0	—		—		0	0	0	0
Flandria	Total		74	2	2	0	—		—		0	0	76	2
Deportivo Morón (loan)	2013–14	Primera B Metropolitana	38	1	0	0	—		—		0	0	38	1
Deportivo Morón	2014	Primera B Metropolitana	18	1	0	0	—		—		1 (Note: One appearance in the 2014 Primera B Metropolitana play-offs)	0	19	1
Deportivo Morón	2015	Primera B Metropolitana	39	3	1	0	—		—		4 (Note: Four appearances in the 2015 Primera B Metropolitana play-offs)	0	44	3
Deportivo Morón	2016	Primera B Metropolitana	19	1	1	0	—		—		0	0	20	1
Deportivo Morón	2016–17	Primera B Metropolitana	32	0	2	0	—		—		0	0	34	0
Deportivo Morón	2017–18	Primera B Nacional	19	0	4	0	—		—		0	0	23	0
Deportivo Morón	2018–19	Primera B Nacional	12	0	1	0	—		—		0	0	13	0
Deportivo Morón	Total		177	6	9	0	—		—		5	0	191	6
Career total			251	8	9	0	—		—		5	0	265	8

== Honours ==
Deportivo Morón

- Primera B Metropolitana: 2016–17
