= Cristian Lillo =

Argentine footballer

Personal information
- Full name: Cristian Damián Lillo
- Date of birth: 12 August 1985 (age 41)
- Place of birth: Caseros, Argentina
- Height: 1.78 m (5 ft 10 in)
- Position: Midfielder

Team information
- Current team: Deportivo Morón

Youth career
- Alianza Sociedad de Fomento
- Estudiantes BA

Senior career*
Years	Team	Apps	(Gls)
2004–2007	Estudiantes BA		
2008	Ferro Carril Oeste	25	(0)
2009–2010	Estudiantes BA		
2010–2011	Platense	27	(1)
2011–2012	Defensores de Belgrano	32	(0)
2012	Altamira	12	(0)
2012–2014	Flandria	56	(1)
2014–	Deportivo Morón	200	(9)
- * Club domestic league appearances and goals as of 17:53, 14 July 2022 (UTC)

Cristian Damián Lillo (born 12 August 1985) is an Argentine professional footballer who plays as a midfielder for Deportivo Morón.

== Career ==
Lillo, after spending his youth at Alianza Sociedad de Fomento, started in 2004 with Estudiantes, where he remained for three seasons. In 2008, Lillo had a stint with Ferro Carril Oeste, appearing twenty-five times before rejoining Estudiantes in January 2009. In June 2010, Lillo joined Primera B Metropolitana team Platense. One goal, versus Almagro, in twenty-seven matches followed. After spending 2011–12 with Defensores de Belgrano, Lillo moved to Mexico by signing with Ascenso MX's Altamira. His debut came on 22 July 2012 against Toros Neza, which preceded his first goal in a Copa MX win over Atlas days later.

Lillo sealed a move back to Argentina on 18 December 2012 after joining Flandria. He spent two seasons back with the Primera B Metropolitana club, with the second ending with relegation to Primera C Metropolitana. Lillo subsequently remained in the third tier after he signed for Deportivo Morón. Having scored five goals in one hundred and seven games in all competitions, he made his first appearance in Primera B Nacional versus Los Andes after they won promotion as champions in 2016–17.

== Personal life ==
In 2017, Lillo became president of former youth club Alianza Sociedad de Fomento; having previously been vice president, he had also joined the board of directors at the age of eighteen.

== Career statistics ==
As of 22 December 2018.

Club statistics
Club	Season	League			Cup (Note: Includes the Copa Argentina)		League Cup		Continental		Other		Total	
Club	Season	Division	Apps	Goals	Apps	Goals	Apps	Goals	Apps	Goals	Apps	Goals	Apps	Goals
Ferro Carril Oeste	2007–08	Primera B Nacional	14	0	0	0	—		—		0	0	14	0
Ferro Carril Oeste	2008–09	Primera B Nacional	11	0	0	0	—		—		0	0	11	0
Ferro Carril Oeste	Total		25	0	0	0	—		—		0	0	25	0
Platense	2010–11	Primera B Metropolitana	27	1	0	0	—		—		0	0	27	1
Defensores de Belgrano	2011–12	Primera B Metropolitana	32	0	1	0	—		—		0	0	33	0
Altamira	2012–13	Ascenso MX	12	0	5	1	—		—		0	0	17	1
Flandria	2012–13	Primera B Metropolitana	19	1	1	0	—		—		0	0	20	1
Flandria	2013–14	Primera B Metropolitana	37	0	0	0	—		—		0	0	37	0
Flandria	Total		56	1	0	0	—		—		0	0	56	1
Deportivo Morón	2014	Primera B Metropolitana	17	0	0	0	—		—		1 (Note: One appearance in the 2014 Primera B Metropolitana play-offs)	0	18	0
Deportivo Morón	2015	Primera B Metropolitana	36	2	1	0	—		—		4 (Note: Four appearances in the 2015 Primera B Metropolitana play-offs)	0	41	2
Deportivo Morón	2016	Primera B Metropolitana	14	0	0	0	—		—		0	0	14	0
Deportivo Morón	2016–17	Primera B Metropolitana	32	3	2	0	—		—		0	0	34	3
Deportivo Morón	2017–18	Primera B Nacional	16	1	3	0	—		—		0	0	19	1
Deportivo Morón	2018–19	Primera B Nacional	10	1	0	0	—		—		0	0	10	1
Deportivo Morón	Total		125	7	6	0	—		—		5	0	136	7
Career total			277	9	13	1	—		—		5	0	295	10

== Honours ==
Deportivo Morón

- Primera B Metropolitana: 2016–17
