= Gonzalo Baglivo =

Argentine footballer (born 1996)

Personal information
- Full name: Gonzalo Leandro Baglivo
- Date of birth: 26 February 1996 (age 30)
- Place of birth: Remedios de Escalada, Argentina
- Height: 1.73 m (5 ft 8 in)
- Position: Midfielder

Team information
- Current team: Colegiales

Youth career
- 2006–2017: Lanús

Senior career*
| Years | Team | Apps | (Gls) |
| 2017–2018 | UTC | 49 | (4) |
| 2019 | Deportivo Morón | 2 | (0) |
| 2020–2022 | Camioneros | 45 | (2) |
| 2023 | Liniers BB | 0 | (0) |
| 2023 | El Linqueño | 23 | (3) |
| 2023 | Deportivo Mandiyú | 4 | (0) |
| 2024 | Deportes Quindío | 39 | (5) |
| 2025 | Unión San Felipe | 10 | (0) |
| 2025–2026 | Douglas Haig | 15 | (6) |
| 2026– | Colegiales | 4 | (0) |
- * Club domestic league appearances and goals as of 17:21, 25 April 2026 (UTC)

Gonzalo Leandro Baglivo (born 26 February 1996) is an Argentine professional footballer who plays as a midfielder for Colegiales.

== Career ==
Baglivo began in the youth academy of Argentina's Lanús, notably appearing at the 2016 U-20 Copa Libertadores having joined in 2006. In January 2017, Baglivo completed a move to Peruvian Primera División side UT Cajamarca. He made twenty-three appearances during his first season, one arrived in a 2–0 victory over Sport Huancayo on 14 April which he ended with his opening senior goal. Baglivo remained for two seasons in Peru after participating in forty-nine league fixtures whilst netting goals against Universidad San Martín, Ayacucho and Comerciantes Unidos; he also made appearances in the 2018 Copa Sudamericana.

On 24 January 2019, Baglivo was signed by Primera B Nacional's Deportivo Morón. His bow in Argentine football arrived in a draw with Independiente Rivadavia in February.

During 2023, Baglivo played for El Linqueño, after joining Liniers de Bahía Blanca, and Deportivo Mandiyú.

In 2024, Baglivo played for Colombian club Deportes Quindío. The next season, he moved to Chile and joined Unión San Felipe.

== Personal life ==
Baglivo's brother, Enzo, is a fellow professional footballer.

== Career statistics ==
As of 18 February 2019.

Appearances and goals by club, season and competition
| Club | Season | League | | | Cup | | Continental | | Other | | Total | |
| Club | Season | Division | Apps | Goals | Apps | Goals | Apps | Goals | Apps | Goals | Apps | Goals |
|---|---|---|---|---|---|---|---|---|---|---|---|---|
| UT Cajamarca | 2017 | Primera División | 23 | 1 | 0 | 0 | — | | 0 | 0 | 23 | 1 |
| UT Cajamarca | 2018 | Primera División | 26 | 3 | 0 | 0 | 2 (Note: Appearance(s) in the Copa Sudamericana) | 0 | 0 | 0 | 28 | 3 |
| UT Cajamarca | Total | | 49 | 4 | 0 | 0 | 2 | 0 | 0 | 0 | 51 | 4 |
| Deportivo Morón | 2018–19 | Primera B Nacional | 1 | 0 | 0 | 0 | — | | 0 | 0 | 1 | 0 |
| Career total | | | 50 | 4 | 0 | 0 | 2 | 0 | 0 | 0 | 52 | 4 |
