= Tonetto =

Tonetto is an Italian surname. Notable people with the surname include:

- Diego Tonetto (born 1988), Argentine footballer
- Max Tonetto (born 1974), Italian footballer
