= Leonel Bontempo =

Argentine footballer (born 1992)

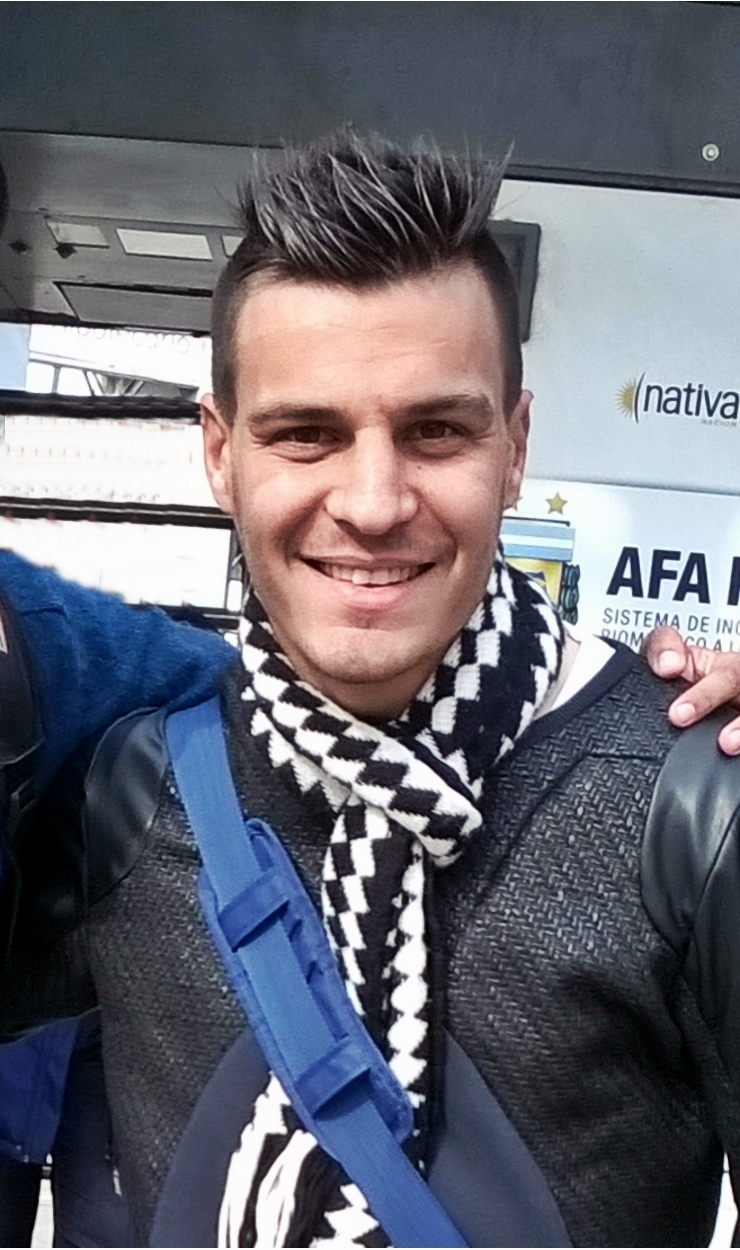

Personal information
- Full name: Leonel Juan Daniel Bontempo
- Date of birth: 1 November 1992 (age 34)
- Place of birth: Buenos Aires, Argentina
- Height: 1.72 m (5 ft 7 1/2 in)
- Position: Left-back

Youth career
- Quilmes

Senior career*
Years	Team	Apps	(Gls)
2013–2016	Quilmes	55	(0)
2016	Racing Santander	14	(0)
2018–2020	Barracas Central	66	(0)
2020–2022	Deportivo Morón	63	(1)
2023	San Martín de San Juan	36	(5)
2024	Montevideo Wanderers	17	(0)
- * Club domestic league appearances and goals as of 30 November 2024

Leonel Juan Daniel Bontempo (born 1 November 1992) is an Argentine footballer who plays as a left-back.

== Club career ==
Born in Buenos Aires, Bontempo played youth football for Quilmes. He made his first team – and Primera División – debut on 4 August 2013, starting in a 0–2 away loss against Rosario Central.

Bontempo already became a regular starter for the club during his first professional campaign, contributing with 18 matches. He remained undisputed in the following three seasons, being released in July 2016 after his contract expired.

In August 2016, Bontempo was linked to a move to Championship club Sheffield Wednesday. However, nothing came of it and he signed for Spanish Segunda División B club Racing de Santander on 20 September.
