= Gastón González (footballer, born 1988) =

Argentine footballer

Personal information
- Full name: Gastón Germán González
- Date of birth: 23 February 1988 (age 38)
- Place of birth: Lanús, Argentina
- Height: 1.75 m (5 ft 9 in)
- Position: Midfielder

Team information
- Current team: Deportivo Morón

Youth career
- Platense

Senior career*
Years	Team	Apps	(Gls)
2008–2009	Platense	2	(0)
2011–2013	Platanias	54	(1)
2013–2014	Episkopi	23	(9)
2014–2015	Apollon Smyrnis	7	(1)
2015	Chania	11	(0)
2015	Trikala	11	(2)
2016–2018	Independiente Rivadavia	76	(9)
2018–2019	Deportivo Morón	20	(3)
2019–2021	Belgrano	11	(0)
2021–2023	Deportivo Morón	67	(17)
2023–2024	Ferro Carril Oeste	9	(0)
2024–	Deportivo Morón	66	(8)
- * Club domestic league appearances and goals as of 17:34, 27 April 2026 (UTC)

Gastón Germán González (born 23 February 1988) is an Argentine professional footballer who plays as a midfielder for Deportivo Morón.

== Career ==
González's opening club became Primera B Nacional side Platense in 2008, with the midfielder appearing in two fixtures for the club. In 2011, González completed a move to Platanias of the Greek Football League. He made his debut during a win away to Panachaiki on 30 October, before netting his first senior goal in the following April against Fokikos. The 2011–12 season concluded with promotion to Super League Greece, in which he made nineteen appearances. González returned to the Football League with Episkopi in 2013. Ten goals soon followed, including braces against Iraklis Psachna, Panegialios and Glyfada.

Moves to Apollon Smyrnis and Chania subsequently arrived between July 2014 and June 2015, at which time González sealed a move to fellow second tier outfit Trikala. After scoring twice in thirteen games, he was sent off in his last match on 6 December versus Acharnaikos. González went back to Argentina in January 2016, joining Primera B Nacional's Independiente Rivadavia. He played in a total of seventy-seven fixtures and scored nine across three seasons with the Mendoza club. On 30 June 2018, Deportivo Morón signed González. His first appearance came in a Copa Argentina tie with top-flight Colón on 21 July.

== Career statistics ==
As of 20 December 2018.

Club statistics
Club	Season	League			Cup (Note: Includes the Copa Argentina and Greek Football Cup)		League Cup		Continental		Other		Total	
Club	Season	Division	Apps	Goals	Apps	Goals	Apps	Goals	Apps	Goals	Apps	Goals	Apps	Goals
Platense	2008–09	Primera B Nacional	2	0	0	0	—		—		0	0	2	0
Platanias	2011–12	Football League	35	1	1	0	—		—		0	0	36	1
Platanias	2012–13	Super League Greece	19	0	2	0	—		—		0	0	21	0
Platanias	Total		54	1	3	0	—		—		0	0	57	1
Episkopi	2013–14	Football League	23	9	1	1	—		—		0	0	24	10
Apollon Smyrnis	2014–15	Football League	7	1	4	1	—		—		0	0	11	2
Chania	2014–15	Football League	11	0	3	0	—		—		0	0	14	0
Trikala	2015–16	Football League	11	2	2	0	—		—		0	0	13	2
Independiente Rivadavia	2016	Primera B Nacional	19	3	0	0	—		—		0	0	19	3
Independiente Rivadavia	2016–17	Primera B Nacional	40	4	1	0	—		—		0	0	41	4
Independiente Rivadavia	2017–18	Primera B Nacional	17	2	0	0	—		—		0	0	17	2
Independiente Rivadavia	Total		76	9	1	0	—		—		0	0	77	9
Deportivo Morón	2018–19	Primera B Nacional	10	0	1	0	—		—		0	0	11	0
Career total			194	22	15	2	—		—		0	0	209	24
