= Gerardo Martínez (footballer) =

Argentine footballer

Personal information
- Full name: Gerardo Daniel Martínez
- Date of birth: 11 April 1991 (age 35)
- Place of birth: Moreno, Argentina
- Height: 1.86 m (6 ft 1 in)
- Position: Midfielder

Team information
- Current team: Manta

Senior career*
Years	Team	Apps	(Gls)
2009–2018	Deportivo Morón	176	(21)
2012–2013	→ Cobresal (loan)	26	(0)
2015	→ T. Universitario (loan)	18	(2)
2019	Tristán Suárez	13	(1)
2019–2020	UT Cajamarca	16	(3)
2021	Manta F.C.		
- * Club domestic league appearances and goals as of 24 March 2020

Gerardo Daniel Martínez (born 11 April 1991) is an Argentine professional footballer who plays as a midfielder.
