= Kevin Gissi =

Swiss footballer (born 1992)

Personal information
- Date of birth: 10 September 1992 (age 34)
- Place of birth: Geneva, Switzerland
- Height: 1.90 m (6 ft 3 in)
- Position: Forward

Youth career
- Étoile Carouge
- 2007–2009: Arsenal de Sarandí

Senior career*
Years	Team	Apps	(Gls)
2009–2012	Arsenal de Sarandí		
2012–2013	Servette	3	(0)
2013	Alcoyano	2	(0)
2014	Jūrmala	2	(0)
2015	Badalona	7	(3)
2015–2016	Sant Andreu	21	(13)
2016–2017	Rampla Juniors	14	(4)
2017	Fénix	14	(3)
2017–2018	Independiente Rivadavia	15	(4)
2018–2019	Cuneo	26	(3)
2019–2021	Deportivo Morón	5	(1)
2021	Estudiantes de Río Cuarto	5	(0)
2021	Técnico Universitario	0	(0)
2021–2022	Piacenza	6	(0)
2022	Prato	18	(4)
- * Club domestic league appearances and goals as of 18:37, 14 July 2022 (UTC)

Kevin Gissi (born 10 September 1992) is a Swiss professional footballer who plays as a forward.

== Career ==
Gissi finished his formation with Étoile Carouge FC, and moved back to Argentina in 2007, signing with Arsenal de Sarandí. However, he failed to make a first team appearance with the club, only being assigned to U21 squad.

On 6 July 2012 Gissi returned to Switzerland, signing a one-year deal with Servette. He scored his first goal for Servette against Gandzasar Kapan in the UEFA Europa League qualifiers, and made his first start for the club in the derby against FC Sion.

On 1 September 2013 Gissi moved to Spain, signing with Alcoyano.

Prior to the 2014 Latvian Higher League season, on 14 January 2014, Gissi signed with FC Jūrmala. He left the team in mid-summer, having appeared in two league matches.

In January 2015 Gissi joined the Spanish Segunda División B club Badalona. As of July 2016, Gissi is playing with Rampla Juniors in Uruguay.

On 30 July 2021, he joined to Italian Serie C club Piacenza. On 25 January 2022, he moved to Prato, where he played the rest of the season.

== Personal life ==
Gissi's older brother, Dylan, is also a footballer.
