= Nicolás Ramírez (Argentine footballer) =

Argentine footballer

Personal information
- Full name: Nicolás Francisco Ramírez
- Date of birth: 18 February 1988 (age 38)
- Place of birth: Buenos Aires, Argentina
- Height: 1.73 m (5 ft 8 in)
- Positions: Right winger; forward

Team information
- Current team: Deportivo Camioneros

Youth career
- Lanús

Senior career*
Years	Team	Apps	(Gls)
2006–2011	Lanús	33	(3)
2009–2010	→ Chacarita Juniors (loan)	22	(1)
2011	Manta	14	(2)
2011–2012	Atlanta	24	(3)
2012–2013	Peñarol	1	(0)
2013–2014	Racing de Olavarría	25	(1)
2014–2015	Unión Mar del Plata	55	(7)
2016	Los Andes	28	(0)
2017–2020	Deportivo Morón	74	(8)
2020–	Deportivo Camioneros	25	(1)
- * Club domestic league appearances and goals as of 17:51, 14 July 2022 (UTC)

Nicolás Francisco Ramírez (born 18 February 1988, in Buenos Aires) is an Argentine footballer, who plays as a right winger for Deportivo Morón.

== Career ==
On 10 April 2008, Ramírez scored his first goal in professional football with a goal described as unforgettable by Clarín to bring his team back to 3–3 after being 0–3 down to Racing Club.

In 2009, Ramírez joined newly promoted Chacarita Juniors, on loan.
