= Juan Celaya (footballer) =

Argentine footballer (born 1992)

Personal information
- Full name: Juan Gabriel Celaya
- Date of birth: 14 February 1992 (age 34)
- Place of birth: Arroyo Seco, Argentina
- Height: 1.80 m (5 ft 11 in)
- Position: Centre back

Team information
- Current team: Acassuso

Youth career
- Unión de Arroyo Seco

Senior career*
Years	Team	Apps	(Gls)
2010–2012	Tigre	0	(0)
2012–2018	Villa Dálmine	116	(4)
2016	→ Quilmes (loan)	12	(0)
2016–2017	→ Arsenal de Sarandí (loan)	2	(0)
2018–2019	Deportivo Morón	8	(0)
2020–	Acassuso	6	(0)
- * Club domestic league appearances and goals as of 11:49, 20 May 2020 (UTC)

Juan Gabriel Celaya (born 14 February 1992) is an Argentine professional footballer who plays as a defender for Club Atlético Acassuso.

== Career ==
Celaya began in the youth of his local side Unión de Arroyo Seco. His senior career began with Tigre in 2010, but he left two years later to sign for Primera B Metropolitana team Villa Dálmine. He went onto make ninety-three league appearances and scored four goals between 2012 and 2016 for the club, nine of those appearances and one of those goals came in the promotion-winning (to Primera B Nacional) season of 2014. In 2016, Celaya had two loan spells away from Villa Dálmine. Firstly, on 6 January, Celaya joined Argentine Primera División side Quilmes.

He participated in twelve league fixtures for Quilmes before terminating his loan due to disagreements with the club. In June 2016, Celaya joined another Primera División team, Arsenal de Sarandí, on loan. He made his debut for Arsenal on 27 August against Sarmiento. Celaya made just one further appearance before returning to his parent club. Celaya made his 100th career appearance for Villa Dálmine on 12 November 2017 versus Estudiantes. Celaya made a move to fellow Primera B Nacional squad Deportivo Morón in June 2018.

In December 2019, Celaya signed with Primera B Metropolitana side Club Atlético Acassuso.

== Career statistics ==
As of 9 September 2018.

Club statistics
Club	Season	League			Cup (Note: Includes the Copa Argentina)		League Cup		Continental (Note: Includes the Copa Sudamericana)		Other		Total	
Club	Season	Division	Apps	Goals	Apps	Goals	Apps	Goals	Apps	Goals	Apps	Goals	Apps	Goals
Tigre	2011–12	Primera División	0	0	0	0	—		—		0	0	0	0
Tigre	Total		0	0	0	0	—		—		0	0	0	0
Villa Dálmine	2012–13	Primera B Metropolitana	19	0	0	0	—		—		0	0	19	0
Villa Dálmine	2013–14	Primera B Metropolitana	25	1	1	0	—		—		0	0	26	1
Villa Dálmine	2014	Primera B Metropolitana	9	1	0	0	—		—		0	0	9	1
Villa Dálmine	2015	Primera B Nacional	40	2	0	0	—		—		0	0	40	2
Villa Dálmine	2016	Primera B Nacional	0	0	0	0	—		—		0	0	0	0
Villa Dálmine	2016–17	Primera B Nacional	0	0	0	0	—		—		0	0	0	0
Villa Dálmine	2017–18	Primera B Nacional	23	0	0	0	—		—		0	0	23	0
Villa Dálmine	Total		116	4	1	0	—		—		0	0	117	4
Quilmes (loan)	2016	Primera División	12	0	0	0	—		—		0	0	12	0
Arsenal de Sarandí (loan)	2016–17	Primera División	2	0	0	0	—		0	0	0	0	2	0
Deportivo Morón	2018–19	Primera B Nacional	0	0	1	0	—		—		0	0	1	0
Career total			130	4	2	0	—		0	0	0	0	132	4
