= Agustín Lavezzi =

Argentine footballer (born 1996)

Personal information
- Date of birth: 15 January 1996 (age 30)
- Place of birth: Villa Gobernador Gálvez, Argentina
- Height: 1.77 m (5 ft 10 in)
- Position: Midfielder

Team information
- Current team: Quilmes

Youth career
- Rosario Central

Senior career*
Years	Team	Apps	(Gls)
2016–2018	Coronel Aguirre	25	(11)
2018–2020	Deportivo Morón	16	(0)
2020	Sportivo Las Parejas	30	(10)
2021–2022	Racing de Córdoba	8	(1)
2022–2023	Boca Unidos	17	(11)
2023–2024	Brown Adrogué	32	(6)
2024–2025	Tristán Suárez	36	(18)
2025–2026	San Miguel	27	(4)
2026–	Quilmes	8	(4)
- * Club domestic league appearances and goals as of 17:51, 18 April 2026 (UTC)

Agustín Lavezzi (born 15 January 1996) is an Argentine professional footballer who plays as a midfielder for Quilmes.

== Career ==
Lavezzi started out in the ranks of Rosario Central. He began his senior career in Torneo Federal B, featuring for local club Coronel Aguirre for two years from 2016 whilst making twenty-five appearances and netting eleven goals. In 2018, Lavezzi joined Primera B Nacional side Deportivo Morón. He made his first appearances in November against, for his pro debut, Gimnasia y Esgrima and Instituto, having been an unused substitute for fixtures with Villa Dálmine and Defensores de Belgrano in the previous month. Lavezzi was released in June 2020.

== Personal life ==
Lavezzi is the nephew of fellow professional footballer Ezequiel Lavezzi.

== Career statistics ==
As of 24 June 2020.

Club statistics
Club	Season	League			Cup (Note: Includes the Copa Argentina)		League Cup		Continental		Other		Total	
Club	Season	Division	Apps	Goals	Apps	Goals	Apps	Goals	Apps	Goals	Apps	Goals	Apps	Goals
Deportivo Morón	2018–19	Primera B Nacional	8	0	0	0	—		—		0	0	8	0
Deportivo Morón	2019–20	Primera B Nacional	8	0	0	0	—		—		0	0	8	0
Career total			16	0	0	0	—		—		0	0	16	0
