= Arnaldo Sialle =

Argentine footballer and manager

Personal information
- Full name: Arnaldo Adolfo Sialle
- Date of birth: 21 November 1965 (age 60)
- Place of birth: Rosario, Santa Fe, Argentina
- Position: Defender

Senior career*
Years	Team	Apps	(Gls)
1985–1989	Newell's Old Boys	29	(2)
1989–1991	Irapuato	51	(5)
1993–1995	Caracas		

Managerial career
- 2010–2011: Brown de Puerto Madryn
- 2011–: Talleres
- * Club domestic league appearances and goals

Arnaldo Adolfo Sialle (born 21 November 1965) is a retired football defender who played in the Argentine Primera División and the Mexican Primera División and a football manager.

== Career ==
Born in Rosario, Santa Fe, Sialle began playing professional football with Newell's Old Boys in the Primera División. He made 29 league appearances and scored two goals for the club from 1985 to 1989. In 1989, Sialle moved to Mexico where he played two seasons with Deportivo Irapuato. He would finish his playing career with Caracas F.C. in Venezuela.

After he retired from playing, Sialle began coaching football. He was an assistant to Belgrano de Córdoba manager Dalcio Giovagnoli during 2008 and 2009. Sialle also managed lower-division side Guillermo Brown de Puerto Madryn, leading the club to promotion from the Torneo Argentino A as the 2010–11 season champions. However, he resigned from the club after struggling in the Primera B Nacional September 2011. Soon after, he was appointed manager of Talleres de Córdoba in November 2011.
