= Iván Álvarez (footballer, born 2000) =

Argentine footballer

Personal information
- Full name: Iván Álvarez
- Date of birth: 18 February 2000 (age 26)
- Place of birth: Morón, Argentina
- Height: 1.64 m (5 ft 5 in)
- Position: Midfielder

Team information
- Current team: Dock Sud

Senior career*
Years	Team	Apps	(Gls)
2018–2021	Deportivo Morón	2	(1)
2021	→ Dock Sud (loan)	12	(3)
2022–	Dock Sud	18	(3)
- * Club domestic league appearances and goals as of 18:05, 14 July 2022 (UTC)

Iván Álvarez (born 18 February 2000) is an Argentine professional footballer who plays as a midfielder for Sportivo Dock Sud.

== Career ==
Álvarez began his career with Deportivo Morón. He was moved into the club's senior team during the 2018–19 Primera B Nacional campaign, first appearing in a matchday squad as an unused substitute on 4 November 2018 versus Gimnasia y Esgrima. His professional bow arrived on 19 November during a victory over Santamarina, with the midfielder netting his opening career goal in the process as they won 2–0.

In August 2021, Álvarez moved to Dock Sud on a loan deal. He continued at the club for the 2022 season.

== Career statistics ==
As of 20 December 2018.

Club statistics
Club	Season	League			Cup (Note: Includes the Copa Argentina)		League Cup		Continental		Other		Total	
Club	Season	Division	Apps	Goals	Apps	Goals	Apps	Goals	Apps	Goals	Apps	Goals	Apps	Goals
Deportivo Morón	2018–19	Primera B Nacional	2	1	0	0	—		—		0	0	2	1
Career total			2	1	0	0	—		—		0	0	2	1
