= Bruno Galván =

Argentine footballer

Personal information
- Full name: Bruno Gabriel Galván
- Date of birth: 8 May 1994 (age 32)
- Place of birth: Buenos Aires, Argentina
- Height: 1.86 m (6 ft 1 in)
- Position: Goalkeeper

Team information
- Current team: Almirante Brown

Youth career
- 2005–2015: Boca Juniors

Senior career*
Years	Team	Apps	(Gls)
2015–2017	Boca Juniors	0	(0)
2017	Gualaceo	19	(0)
2018–2020	Deportivo Morón	22	(0)
2020	JJ Urquiza	2	(0)
2021	Deportivo Maipú	1	(0)
2021–2024	Deportivo Morón	50	(0)
2024–2025	Atlanta	9	(0)
2025–	Almirante Brown	23	(0)

International career
2011	Argentina U17	2	(0)
- * Club domestic league appearances and goals as of 17:15, 22 April 2026 (UTC)

Bruno Gabriel Galván (born 8 May 1994) is an Argentine professional footballer who plays as a goalkeeper for Almirante Brown.

== Career ==
=== Club ===
Galván's career began with Boca Juniors, joining as a youth in 2005. He didn't make a first-team appearance for the Argentine Primera División club, but was an unused substitute on five occasions throughout the 2015 season. On 22 July 2017, Galván joined Ecuadorian Serie B side Gualaceo. Nineteen appearances followed for the goalkeeper, with Gualaceo finishing the campaign in seventh place. After departing Ecuador at the end of 2017, Galván returned to Argentine football in July 2018 after securing a move to Primera B Nacional's Deportivo Morón. His professional debut arrived on 5 October during a 1–0 victory over Agropecuario.

=== International ===
In 2011, Galván was selected to represent Argentina at both the South American U-17 Championship and FIFA U-17 World Cup. He won a cap at each tournament, namely against Ecuador and England.

== Career statistics ==
As of 17 December 2018.

Club statistics
Club	Season	League			Cup (Note: Includes the Copa Argentina)		League Cup		Continental (Note: Includes the Copa Libertadores)		Other		Total	
Club	Season	Division	Apps	Goals	Apps	Goals	Apps	Goals	Apps	Goals	Apps	Goals	Apps	Goals
Boca Juniors	2015	Primera División	0	0	0	0	—		0	0	0	0	0	0
Boca Juniors	2016	Primera División	0	0	0	0	—		0	0	0	0	0	0
Boca Juniors	2016–17	Primera División	0	0	0	0	—		0	0	0	0	0	0
Boca Juniors	Total		0	0	0	0	—		0	0	0	0	0	0
Gualaceo	2017	Serie B	19	0	0	0	—		—		0	0	19	0
Deportivo Morón	2018–19	Primera B Nacional	9	0	0	0	—		—		0	0	9	0
Career total			28	0	0	0	—		0	0	0	0	28	0
