= Cristian Broggi =

Argentine footballer (born 1993)

Personal information
- Full name: Cristian Jesús Broggi
- Date of birth: 26 March 1993 (age 33)
- Place of birth: Ituzaingó, Argentina
- Height: 1.79 m (5 ft 10 in)
- Position: Right-back

Youth career
- Deportivo Morón

Senior career*
Years	Team	Apps	(Gls)
2014–2022	Deportivo Morón	157	(2)
2018–2019	→ Barracas Central (loan)	33	(1)
2022–2023	Flandria	33	(2)
2024	Güemes	32	(1)
2025	Alvarado	0	(0)

International career
2016	Argentina U23		
- * Club domestic league appearances and goals as of 16:16, 2 July 2025 (UTC)

Cristian Jesús Broggi (born 26 March 1993) is an Argentine professional footballer who plays as a right-back for .

== Club career ==
Broggi got his career underway with Deportivo Morón. He made one appearance in the 2014 Primera B Metropolitana, featuring for eighty-five minutes of a 1–0 defeat to Acassuso on 11 September. Seventy-eight games came for Broggi across four seasons, with the latter concluding with promotion to Primera B Nacional. He subsequently appeared nine times in the second tier, before Broggi departed on loan in July 2018 to Primera B Metropolitana's Barracas Central. His debut arrived on 2 September versus Justo José de Urquiza, which was followed by him scoring his first goal in December against All Boys in a 2–0 win.

== International career ==
In 2016, Broggi appeared for the Argentina U23s in Kozhikode, India at the Sait Nagjee Trophy.

== Career statistics ==
As of 1 May 2019.

Appearances and goals by club, season and competition
Club	Season	League			Cup		League Cup		Continental		Other		Total	
Club	Season	Division	Apps	Goals	Apps	Goals	Apps	Goals	Apps	Goals	Apps	Goals	Apps	Goals
Deportivo Morón	2014	Primera B Metropolitana	1	0	0	0	—		—		0	0	1	0
Deportivo Morón	2015	Primera B Metropolitana	33	0	0	0	—		—		4 (Note: Appearance(s) in the Primera B Metropolitana play-offs)	0	37	0
Deportivo Morón	2016	Primera B Metropolitana	12	0	1	0	—		—		0	0	13	0
Deportivo Morón	2016–17	Primera B Metropolitana	25	0	2	0	—		—		0	0	27	0
Deportivo Morón	2017–18	Primera B Nacional	9	0	1	0	—		—		0	0	10	0
Deportivo Morón	2018–19	Primera B Nacional	0	0	0	0	—		—		0	0	0	0
Deportivo Morón	Total		80	0	4	0	—		—		4	0	88	0
Barracas Central (loan)	2018–19	Primera B Metropolitana	31	1	1	0	—		—		0	0	32	1
Career total			111	1	5	0	—		—		4	0	120	1

== Honours ==
Deportivo Morón

- Primera B Metropolitana: 2016–17

Barracas Central

- Primera B Metropolitana: 2018–19
