= Ezequiel Lavezzi =

Argentine footballer (born 1985)

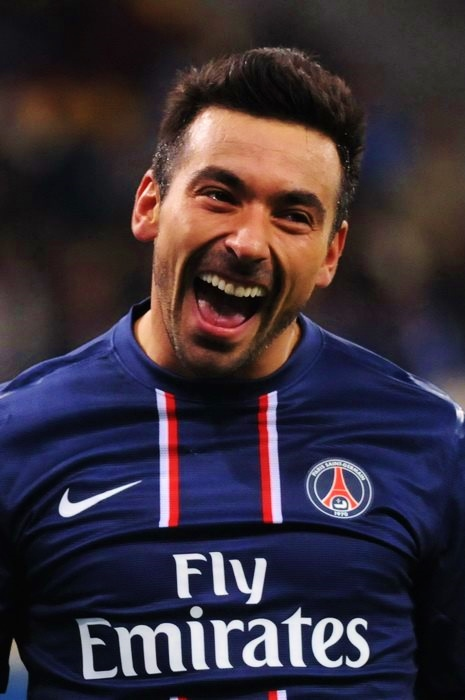
- Lavezzi in action for Paris Saint-Germain in 2013

Personal information
- Full name: Ezequiel Iván Lavezzi
- Date of birth: 3 May 1985 (age 41)
- Place of birth: Villa Gobernador Gálvez, Argentina
- Height: 1.73 m (5 ft 8 in)
- Positions: Forward; winger

Youth career
- 1997–2000: Coronel Aguirre
- 2000–2001: Boca Juniors
- 2001–2003: Estudiantes

Senior career*
Years	Team	Apps	(Gls)
2003–2004	Estudiantes	39	(17)
2004–2007	San Lorenzo	84	(25)
2007–2012	Napoli	156	(38)
2012–2016	Paris Saint-Germain	107	(22)
2016–2019	Hebei China Fortune	74	(35)
Total		460	(137)

International career
2005	Argentina U20	7	(1)
2008	Argentina Olympic	10	(9)
2007–2017	Argentina	51	(9)
Medal record
Men's Football
Representing Argentina
Olympic Games
Gold medal – first place	2008 Beijing	Team
FIFA World Cup
Runner-up	2014 Brazil	Team
Copa América
Runner-up	2015 Chile	Team
Runner-up	2016 United States	Team
- * Club domestic league appearances and goals

Ezequiel Iván "Pocho" Lavezzi (Latin American Spanish: [eseˈkjel iˈβan laˈβesi, ˈpotʃo -], Italian: [laˈvettsi]; born 3 May 1985) is an Argentine former professional footballer who played as a forward. During his career, his most important attributes were his pace, hardworking style of play, technique, creativity, and dribbling ability; although he was usually deployed as a winger, he was also used as a second striker or as an attacking midfielder on occasion.

He began his career at Estudiantes (BA), and after one season was signed by Genoa, who loaned him to San Lorenzo, where he eventually moved on a permanent basis. In 2007, he was signed by Napoli where he won the 2012 Coppa Italia. His performances there earned him a €26.5 million move to Paris Saint-Germain in 2012, where he made over 150 appearances for the club and won three Ligue 1 championships, two Coupes de la Ligue and one Coupe de France. He finished his career in China, where he played for Hebei China Fortune from 2016 to 2019.

Lavezzi represented the Argentina national team from 2007 to 2016. He was part of their team which won an Olympic gold medal in 2008, and also helped them reach the finals of the 2014 FIFA World Cup, the 2015 Copa América and the Copa América Centenario.

== Club career ==
=== Estudiantes (BA) ===
Lavezzi moved to the youth side of Estudiantes (BA) in 2003 where, over one season, he played 39 games and scored 17 goals.

=== San Lorenzo ===
Known as el Pocho ("the Chubby One"), he was bought by Italian side Genoa in 2004 for €1 million, but was loaned out straight-away to Argentina side San Lorenzo. Here at the age of 19, he competed in the Apertura 2004 tournament scoring eight goals in total over the course of the season; which saw him finish as 4th top scorer.

Lavezzi's most notable contributions included a spectacular effort against River Plate at River Plate Stadium. He scored in the 69th minute to give San Lorenzo a famous victory and seriously damage River's title challenge. This gained him the nickname la Bestia ("the Beast") from the Argentine media.

Although it was planned for Lavezzi to return to Genoa after a season on loan, there were problems: while Lavezzi was playing in Argentina, Genoa were involved in an alleged match-fixing scandal which saw them relegated down to Serie C1, the third level of Italian football. Due to financial constraints, the promising forward was sold to San Lorenzo for €1.2 million.

On his return to San Lorenzo for the Apertura 2005 season, he managed to help the club up into the top half of the table, and with eight goals, he finished as the overall fourth top scorer. His last act as a San Lorenzo player was to help them to the Clausura 2007 title, beating out Boca Juniors by six points.

=== Napoli ===
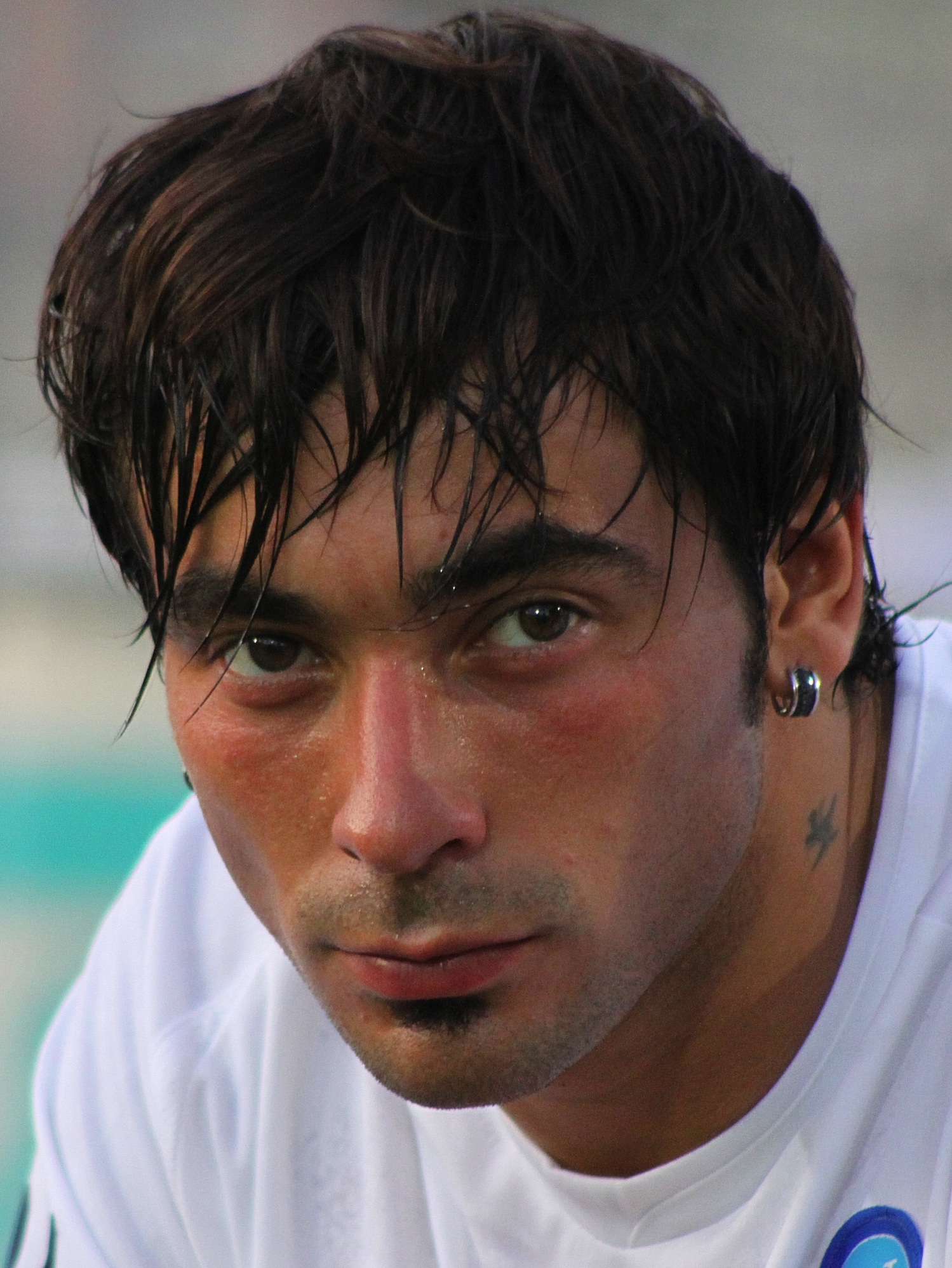
Lavezzi with Napoli in 2009

Napoli had recently achieved promotion back to Serie A, after finishing as runners-up the previous season in Serie B. Looking to strengthen their squad for a return to the top level, Napoli signed Lavezzi on a five-year contract on 5 July 2007. The transfer deal was worth around €6 million and he was presented before the fans and given the number seven shirt for his first season.

Lavezzi soon made an impact for the club by scoring a hat-trick in a 3–1 victory over Pisa in the Coppa Italia at the Stadio San Paolo; this was the first hat-trick by a Napoli player in 14 years. The first league goal Lavezzi scored for Napoli came during a 5–0 victory against Udinese on 2 September 2007. After the match, he was described in reports as "inspirational," with the media proclaiming, "Napoli's star is born." The Neapolitan club hadn't won a league match by such a large margin since 1988, when Diego Maradona was at the club.

The media, as they tend to do to many promising young Argentine players who appear in Italy, have been quick to dub Lavezzi the "New Maradona". Lavezzi himself, however, played this down, instead comparing himself to another Argentine player, Carlos Tevez.

He completed the 2007–08 season with eight goals in 35 games. He quickly became a focal point of the fans' affection with his quick feet and sharpness around the box. In the 2008–09 season, he scored seven goals in 30 games. In the season 2009–10 he scored eight goals in 30 games but missed around 10 games because of injuries. Lavezzi stayed at Napoli for the 2010–11 season but was handed the number 22 jersey after he gave his number seven to recently signed striker Edinson Cavani as a welcome gesture. In the same season, he scored two goals in the UEFA Europa League, against IF Elfsborg and Liverpool respectively, scored six and assisted a further 12 in the Serie A, while also finding the back of the net in a Coppa Italia match against Bologna.

Lavezzi scored his first goal of the 2011–12 campaign in a commanding 3–1 victory over Cesena on 10 September, opening the scoring in the third minute after controlling a long-ball from Hugo Campagnaro. Lavezzi was named "Man of the Match" as he volleyed in a lobbed pass from strike partner Edinson Cavani to send Napoli to a 2–0 victory over Udinese on 26 October. Shortly before the winter break, Lavezzi netted once and provided an assist for one of Cavani's goals as Napoli outclassed Lecce 4–2.

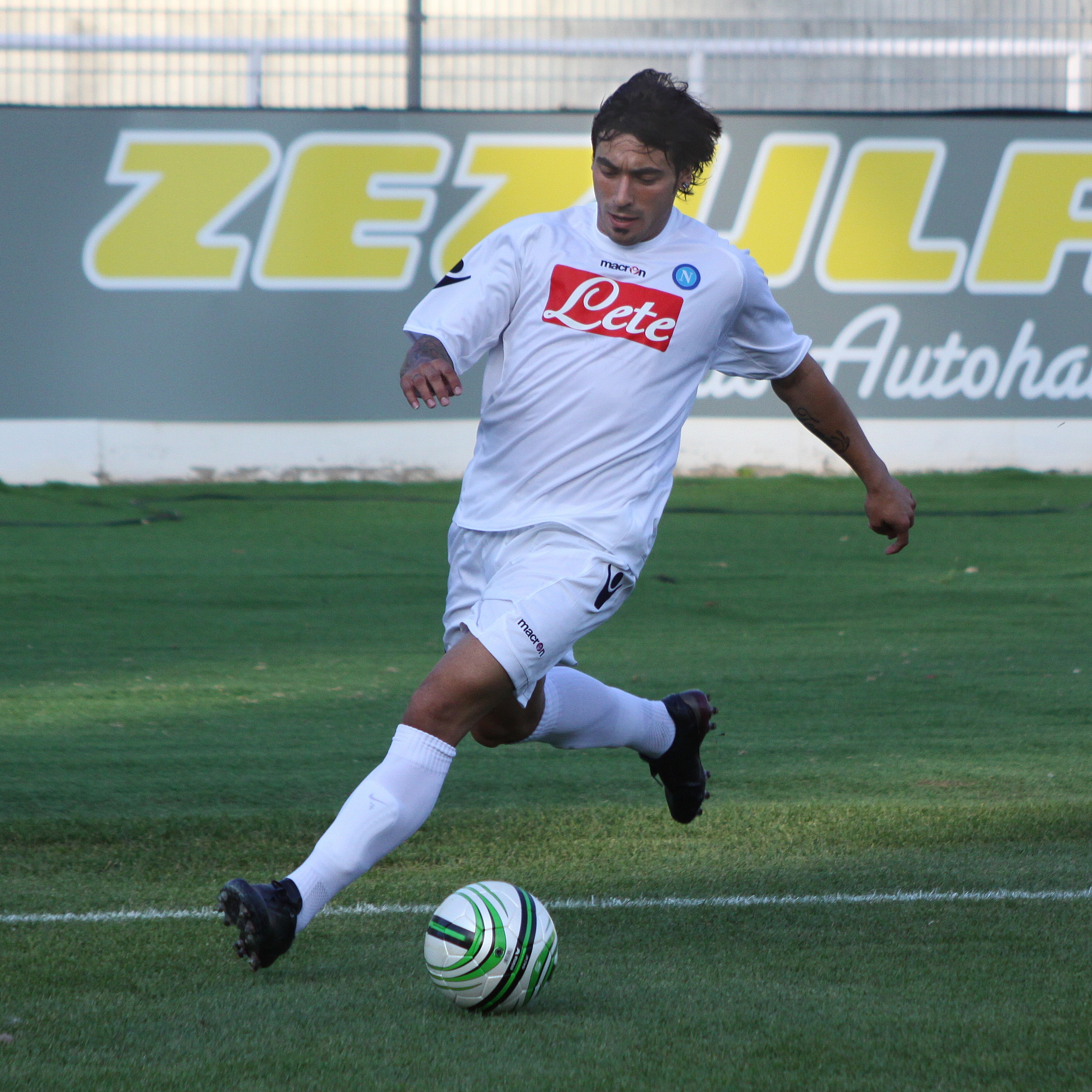
Lavezzi in 2009, during his spell with Napoli

In Napoli's commanding 3–0 victory over Fiorentina on 17 February 2012, Lavezzi rounded off the scoring in the 90th minute with a long-range goal. Four days later, he scored his first two Champions League goals; they came in a 3–1 first leg victory over Chelsea in the Round of 16. The following Sunday, on 26 February, Lavezzi scored the only goal of the game as Napoli defeated Internazionale and climbed up to fifth place in the Serie A standings.

Lavezzi popped up in the 86th minute to score the winning goal against Parma on 4 March 2012, though the result was controversial, as Lavezzi appeared to be in an offside position. Lavezzi netted a penalty and provided an assist as Napoli tore apart Cagliari 6–3 on 9 March to warm up for their Round of 16 second leg tie against Chelsea. Lavezzi scored his ninth and final Serie A goal of the season in a 3–1 loss to Atalanta on 11 April after receiving the ball from Goran Pandev and pushing it past goalkeeper Andrea Consigli.

Lavezzi won his first piece of silverware with Napoli on 20 May 2012 as the club defeated Juventus 2–0 in the Coppa Italia final. During the match, Lavezzi was fouled in the penalty box by Juventus goalkeeper Marco Storari, and Napoli were awarded a penalty, which Edinson Cavani dispatched to give Napoli their first goal and set the club on their way to their first trophy in more than 20 years.

=== Paris Saint-Germain ===
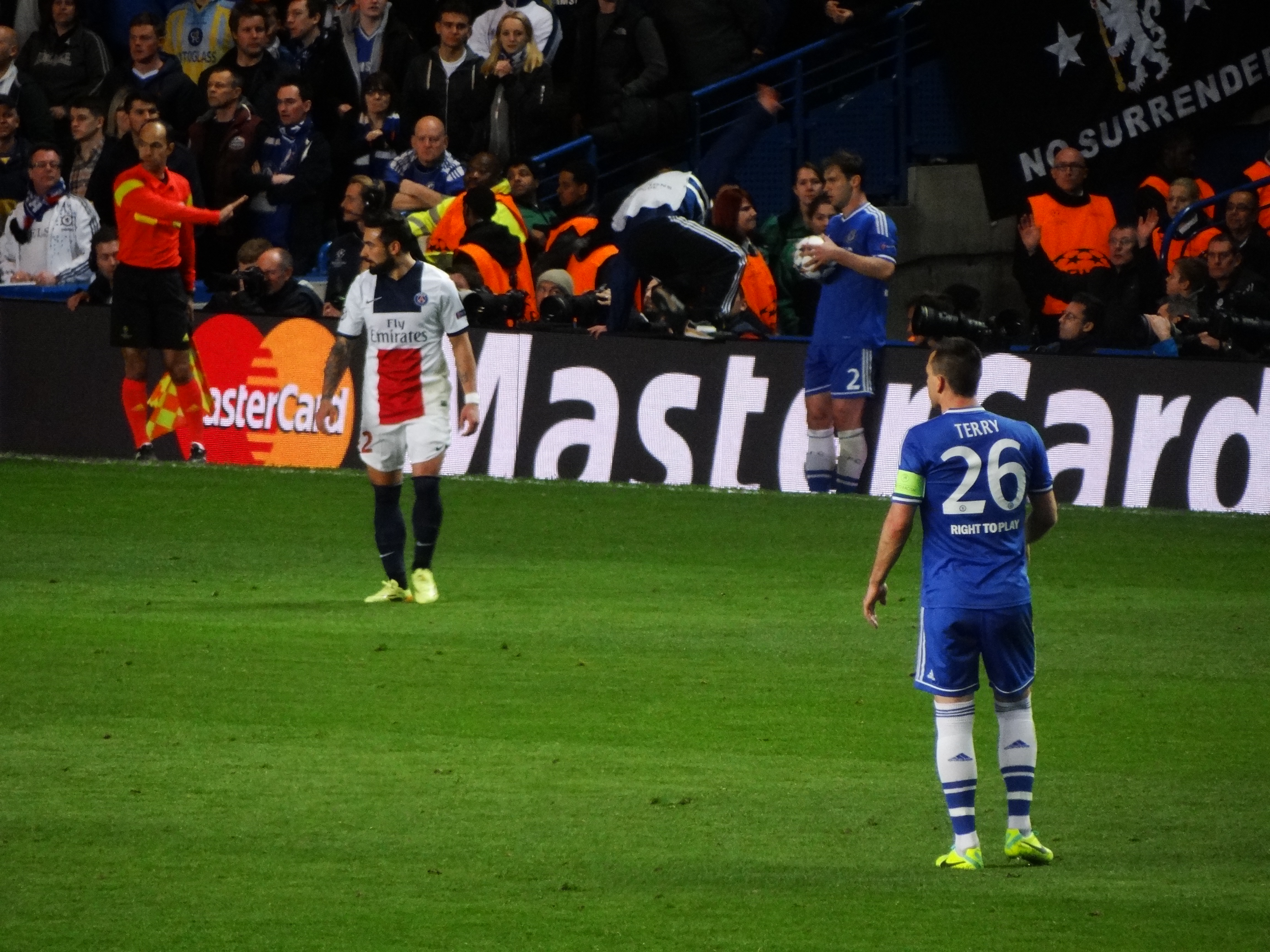
Lavezzi in PSG's Champions League quarter-final against Chelsea in April 2014

On 2 July 2012, Ligue 1 club Paris Saint-Germain confirmed that they had agreed with Napoli to a €26.5 million transfer fee for the rights to Lavezzi and signed him to a four-year deal, reportedly worth up to €30 million. On 11 August, Lavezzi made his PSG debut against FC Lorient in a 2–2 draw in the opening match of the 2012–13 Ligue 1 season. His first two goals for PSG came on 21 November in the Champions League, securing qualification to the Round of 16 with a 0–2 away victory over Dynamo Kyiv.

Lavezzi scored his third Champions League goal for PSG on 4 December, netting at the near post of FC Porto goalkeeper Helton shortly after the hour mark; the 2–1 defeat of the Portuguese champions ensured PSG top spot in the group. His first league goal came four days later, on 8 December, in PSG's 4–0 defeat of Evian at the Parc des Princes. On 11 December, Lavezzi scored PSG's fourth goal, after a Zlatan Ibrahimović hat-trick, as the capital club handed Valenciennes FC their first home defeat of the season.

On 12 February 2013, Lavezzi scored the opening goal against Valencia CF in the Champions League Round of 16, helping PSG secure a 1–2 first leg away victory. Lavezzi secured the tie, equalizing the game at 1–1 and giving the French side a 3–2 aggregate win, advancing to the quarter-finals of the Champions League for the first time since 1995.

Lavezzi scored the 83rd-minute winner in a 3–2 win at Metz on 21 November 2014 to put PSG into first place in Ligue 1 ahead of Marseille.

In January 2015, Lavezzi and Edinson Cavani were fined and suspended for two matches by PSG manager Laurent Blanc for missing a mid-season training camp in Morocco and the first training session after the break.

On 25 April 2015, Lavezzi scored a hat-trick in PSG's 6–1 defeat of Lille. On 16 May, he scored the winning goal in a 2–1 win at Montpellier to confirm a third consecutive French league title for Paris Saint-Germain.

=== Hebei China Fortune ===
On 17 February 2016, Lavezzi signed with Hebei China Fortune on a two-year deal. Due to picking up an injury in June 2016 on international duty for Argentina in the Copa América, Lavezzi was restricted to just 10 appearances in his debut season for Hebei China Fortune.

In May 2017, Lavezzi took part in a Chinese Super League photo session, in which he pulled his eyes back in one photo, a pose he was reportedly told to perform by the cameraman present. This prompted a huge backlash on social media, with Chinese people and others accusing Lavezzi of racism. Lavezzi later apologized for this incident.

On 27 November 2019, Lavezzi scored his last goal for the club in a 3–1 loss against Guangzhou Evergrande. He announced his retirement shortly after the match.

== International career ==
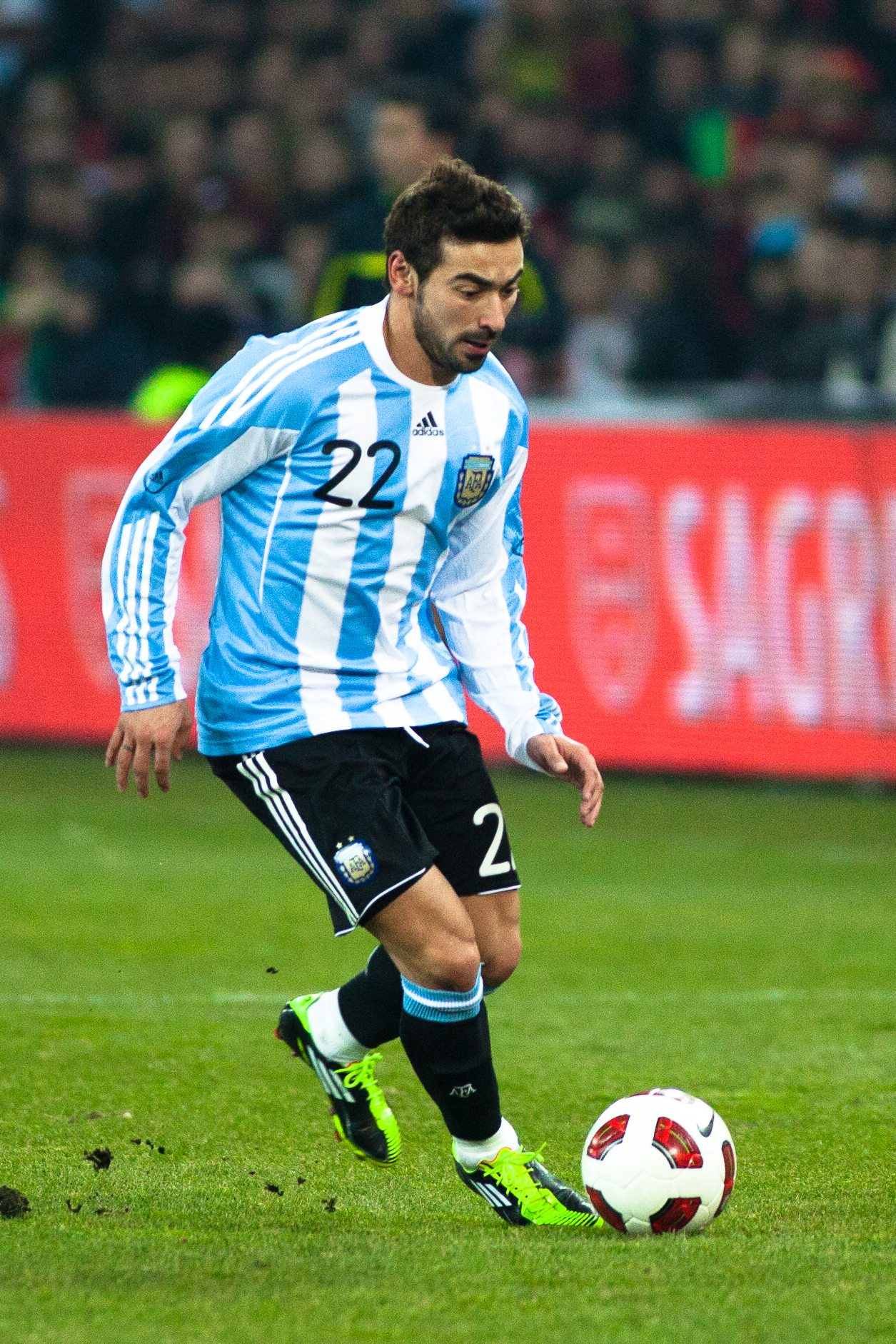
Lavezzi playing for Argentina in 2011

Lavezzi debuted for the Argentina national football team in a friendly match against Chile on 18 April 2007. In 2008, he was selected to the Olympic football team, which represented Argentina at the 2008 Olympics. During the Olympic games, Lavezzi scored two goals, one against Australia on 10 August and a penalty against Serbia on 13 August. He also appeared in the final minutes of extra time of the gold medal match against Nigeria, which Argentina won 1–0.

Lavezzi's club form was not enough to see him included in Diego Maradona's 2010 FIFA World Cup squad, a surprise exclusion along with Newcastle United defender Fabricio Coloccini. On 17 November 2010, Argentina faced Brazil in a friendly match in Qatar, in which Argentina won by a goal from Lionel Messi in injury time after a superb one-two play with Lavezzi. He was named in Argentina's 2011 Copa América squad by Batista. In Argentina's final pre-tournament warm-up game on 21 June 2011, he scored the opening goal in a friendly match played against Albania, the match ended 4–0 in favour of Argentina and was Lavezzi's first goal for the national side. In the final tournament on home soil, Lavezzi made three appearances in the group stage, but was suspended for the quarter-final match, in which the hosts were knocked out by the eventual champions Uruguay on penalties.

Lavezzi was chosen by new manager Alejandro Sabella for Argentina's 23-man 2014 FIFA World Cup squad. He made six appearances throughout the tournament, setting up Messi's match-winning goal against Iran after coming off the bench, as well as Rojo's goal against Nigeria. In the final against Germany he set up a goal for Higuaín, but it was correctly ruled off-side; Lavezzi was replaced by Sergio Agüero at half-time, and Argentina were defeated 1–0 in extra time. Lavezzi was a member of the Argentina squad that reached the final of the 2015 Copa América, only to be defeated by hosts Chile on penalties.

In May 2016, Lavezzi was included in Gerardo Martino's final 23-man Argentina squad for the Copa América Centenario. He made his first start of the tournament in Argentina's final group match against Bolivia on 14 June, scoring a goal and setting up another in a 3–0 victory; he was named Man of the Match. In the semi-finals of the tournament, a 4–0 victory against the hosts United States, Lavezzi opened the scoring in the third minute of play and later set up Gonzalo Higuaín's first goal, but broke his left elbow after he tumbled over the advertisement boarding while chasing the ball. Due to this injury he was ruled out of the final against Chile where Argentina were defeated 2–4 on penalties following a 0–0 draw after extra time.

== Style of play ==
Lavezzi is known for his pace, acceleration, energy, sturdy physique, movement, and hardworking style of play, as well as his technique, creativity, quick feet, dribbling ability, and sharpness around the box; he is also a good shooter. ESPN has described Lavezzi as being "excellent at roaming and finding space in the gap between the opposition's midfield and defence. He has excellent pace and crossing ability and is also adept at beating an opponent or drawing a foul in dangerous areas. He is considered a quality player physically, tactically and technically." A versatile forward, although he is usually deployed as a winger on either flank, due to his ability with either foot, he has also been used as a second striker or as an attacking midfielder on occasion, due to his ability to both score goals and create chances for his teammates. He has also been used as a centre-forward, in a role which is known as a centravanti di manovra in Italian football jargon (literally "maneuvering centre-forward"), which is similar to the modern false 9 role, due to his ability to drop deep and open up defences. In spite of his skill and abilities as a footballer, he has been accused of being overly temperamental on the pitch at times, and has been criticised for arguing with officials.

== Personal life ==
Lavezzi is of Italian origin, from Pavia. He is Catholic and has a tattoo of Jesus on his chest, a tattoo of the Virgin Mary on his right arm and a tattoo of a pair of rosary beads on his right abdomen.

Lavezzi has been married twice: with Débora, with whom he has a son, Tomás (born 2006); and with Yanina Screpante. He later dated Natalia Borges until 2022. He is currently in a relationship with María Guadalupe Tauro, with whom he had a second son, Vittorio (born July 2024).

Lavezzi's nephew Agustín is also a professional footballer.

== Career statistics ==
=== Club ===
Appearances and goals by club, season and competition
Club	Season	League			National cup (Note: Includes Coppa Italia, Coupe de France, Chinese FA Cup)		League cup (Note: Includes Coupe de la Ligue)		Continental		Other		Total	
Club	Season	Division	Apps	Goals	Apps	Goals	Apps	Goals	Apps	Goals	Apps	Goals	Apps	Goals
Estudiantes (BA)	2003–04	Primera B	39	17	—		—		—		—		39	17
San Lorenzo	2004–05	Primera División	29	9	—		—		9 (Note: Five appearances in Copa Libertadores, four appearances in Copa Sudamericana)	0	—		37	9
San Lorenzo	2005–06	Primera División	22	9	—		—		—		—		22	9
San Lorenzo	2006–07	Primera División	33	7	—		—		5 (Note: Appearances in Copa Sudamericana)	1	—		38	8
San Lorenzo	Total		84	25	—		—		14	1	—		97	26
Napoli	2007–08	Serie A	35	8	5	3	—		—		—		40	11
Napoli	2008–09	Serie A	30	7	1	0	—		3 (Note: Appearances in UEFA Cup)	1	—		34	8
Napoli	2009–10	Serie A	30	8	1	1	—		—		—		31	9
Napoli	2010–11	Serie A	31	6	1	1	—		9 (Note: Appearances in UEFA Europa League)	2	—		41	9
Napoli	2011–12	Serie A	30	9	4	0	—		8 (Note: Appearances in UEFA Champions League)	2	—		42	11
Napoli	Total		156	38	12	5	—		20	5	—		188	48
Paris Saint-Germain	2012–13	Ligue 1	28	3	4	3	1	0	9	5	—		42	11
Paris Saint-Germain	2013–14	Ligue 1	32	9	1	1	4	0	10	2	1 (Note: Appearance in Trophée des Champions)	0	48	12
Paris Saint-Germain	2014–15	Ligue 1	31	8	5	1	3	0	8	0	0	0	45	9
Paris Saint-Germain	2015–16	Ligue 1	16	2	1	0	3	1	4	0	0	0	24	3
Paris Saint-Germain	Total		107	22	11	5	11	1	31	7	1	0	161	35
Hebei China Fortune	2016	Chinese Super League	10	0	0	0	—		—		—		10	0
Hebei China Fortune	2017	Chinese Super League	27	20	0	0	—		—		—		27	20
Hebei China Fortune	2018	Chinese Super League	26	12	1	0	—		—		—		27	12
Hebei China Fortune	2019	Chinese Super League	11	3	0	0	—		—		—		11	3
Hebei China Fortune	Total		74	35	1	0	—		—		—		75	35
Career total			460	137	24	10	11	1	65	13	1	0	560	161

=== International ===
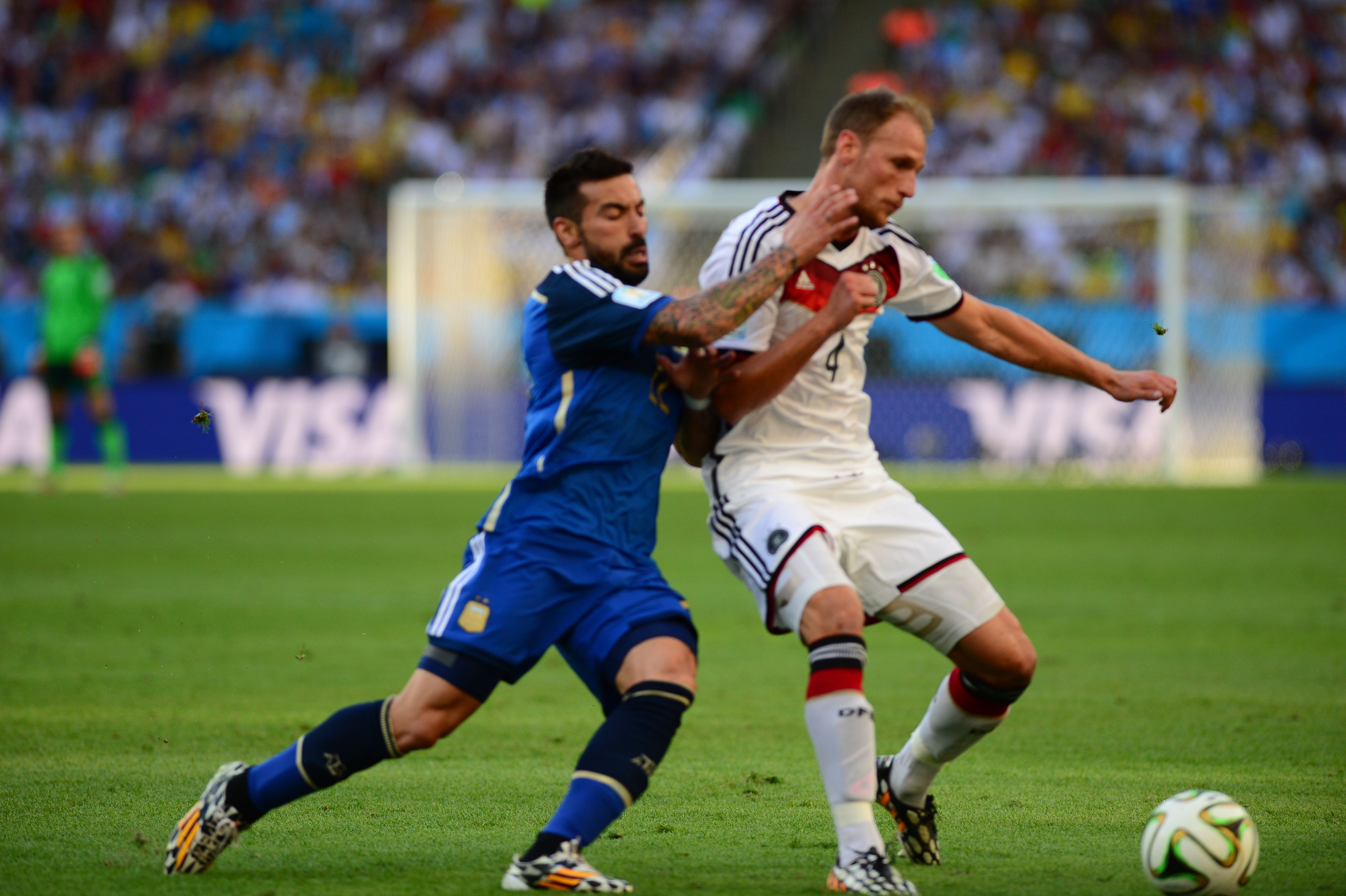
Lavezzi challenging Germany's Benedikt Höwedes in the 2014 FIFA World Cup Final

Appearances and goals by national team and year
National team	Year	Apps	Goals
Argentina	2007	2	0
Argentina	2008	1	0
Argentina	2009	3	0
Argentina	2010	3	0
Argentina	2011	7	2
Argentina	2012	4	0
Argentina	2013	8	2
Argentina	2014	9	0
Argentina	2015	11	3
Argentina	2016	3	2
Total		51	9

Scores and results list Argentina's goal tally first, score column indicates score after each Lavezzi goal.

List of international goals scored by Ezequiel Lavezzi
No.	Date	Venue	Opponent	Score	Result	Competition
1	20 June 2011	Estadio Monumental, Buenos Aires, Argentina	Albania	1–0	4–0	Friendly
2	11 November 2011	Estadio Monumental, Buenos Aires, Argentina	Bolivia	1–1	1–1	2014 FIFA World Cup qualification
3	11 October 2013	Estadio Monumental, Buenos Aires, Argentina	Peru	1–1	3–1	2014 FIFA World Cup qualification
4	11 October 2013	Estadio Monumental, Buenos Aires, Argentina	Peru	2–1	3–1	2014 FIFA World Cup qualification
5	4 September 2015	BBVA Compass Stadium, Houston, United States	Bolivia	1–0	7–0	Friendly
6	4 September 2015	BBVA Compass Stadium, Houston, United States	Bolivia	3–0	7–0	Friendly
7	13 November 2015	Estadio Monumental, Buenos Aires, Argentina	Brazil	1–0	1–1	2018 FIFA World Cup qualification
8	14 June 2016	CenturyLink Field, Seattle, United States	Bolivia	2–0	3–0	Copa América Centenario
9	21 June 2016	NRG Stadium, Houston, United States	United States	1–0	4–0	Copa América Centenario

== Honours ==
San Lorenzo

- Argentine Primera División: 2007 Clausura

Napoli

- Coppa Italia: 2011–12

Paris Saint-Germain

- Ligue 1: 2012–13, 2013–14, 2014–15, 2015–16
- Coupe de France: 2014–15, 2015–16
- Coupe de la Ligue: 2013–14, 2014–15, 2015–16
- Trophée des Champions: 2013

Argentina

- Summer Olympics Gold Medal: 2008
- FIFA World Cup runner-up: 2014
- Copa América runner-up: 2015, 2016

=== Individual ===
- San Lorenzo fans' Player of the Clausura: 2007
- Chinese Super League top assist provider: 2017 (15 assists)
