= Diego Tonetto =

Argentine footballer

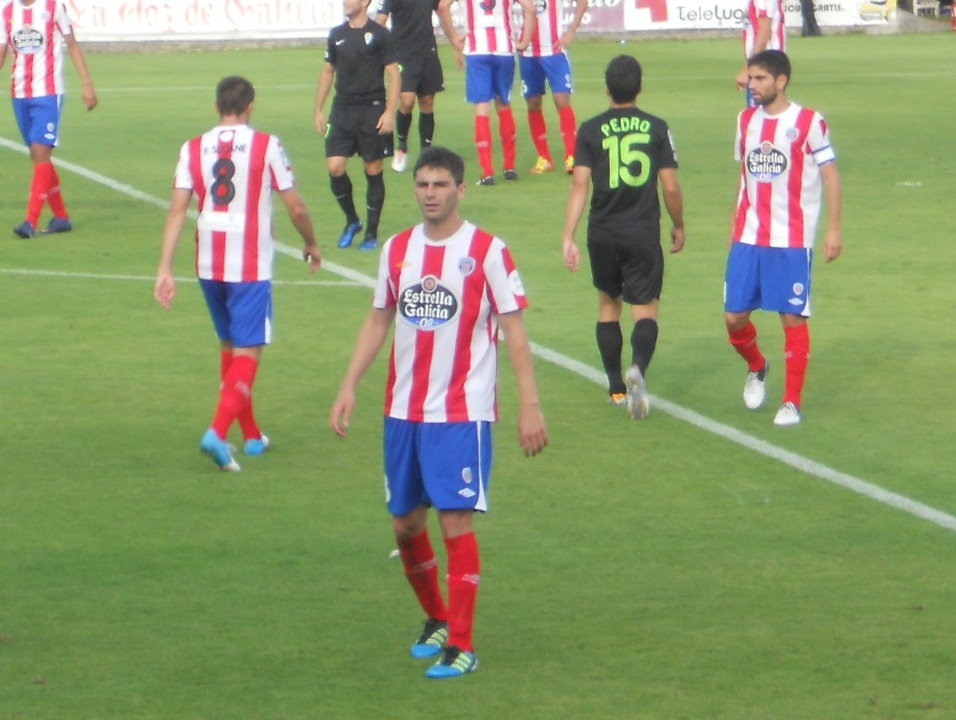

Personal information
- Full name: Diego Rubén Tonetto
- Date of birth: 5 December 1988 (age 37)
- Place of birth: Guaymallén, Argentina
- Height: 1.76 m (5 ft 9 in)
- Position: Winger

Youth career
- Ferro Carril Oeste

Senior career*
Years	Team	Apps	(Gls)
2008–2012	Ferro Carril Oeste	111	(7)
2012–2013	Lugo	35	(2)
2013–2015	Independiente Rivadavia	53	(4)
2015	Defensa y Justicia	4	(0)
2016	Estudiantes Caseros	15	(1)
2016–2017	Instituto	15	(0)
2017–2019	Platense	42	(5)
2019–2020	Deportivo Morón	5	(0)
2020–2022	Deportivo Maipú	34	(1)
2022–2025	Independiente Rivadavia	81	(0)
Total		395	(20)
- * Club domestic league appearances and goals

Diego Rubén Tonetto (born 5 December 1988) is an Argentine former professional footballer who played as a left winger. He also holds an Italian passport.

== Football career ==
Born in Guaymallén, Mendoza Province, Tonetto began his career at Ferro Carril Oeste. On 31 March 2008 he made his senior debut, against Club Atlético Belgrano. He scored his first goal on 1 November against Chacarita Juniors, and finished his second season with 35 appearances and four goals, producing roughly the same numbers in the two following campaigns.

Tonetto left the club in January 2012 by mutual consent. In August, he signed a contract with Spanish side CD Lugo, making his Segunda División debut on the 18th against Hércules CF.

Tonetto scored his first goal in Europe on 29 September 2012, helping the Galicians to a 2–0 home win over CD Mirandés.

== Honours ==
Independiente Rivadavia

- Primera Nacional: 2023
- Copa Argentina: 2025
