= Tony Toneatto =

Tony Toneatto Ph.D.

Tony Toneatto is the director of the Buddhism, Psychology and Mental Health undergraduate program at the University of Toronto. This program offers a number of courses exploring Buddhism, psychology, psychotherapy, mindfulness meditation, applied Buddhism, research methods in Buddhist research and cognitive science.

He is cross-appointed to the Applied Psychology and Human Development Program at the Ontario Institute for Studies in Education. He is also founding faculty of the Buddhist Meditation and Mental Health Counselling diploma program at Emmanuel College at the University of Toronto. Toneatto is the president of Nalanda College of Buddhist Studies. He is the editor-in-chief of the Journal of Buddhism and Psychology. This program is designed to integrate wisdom of Buddhist spirituality into professional and personal practice. Toneatto has published in the areas of substance and behavioral addictions, especially pathological gambling, and mindfulness meditation. He is also a registered clinical psychologist and is currently completing training in psychoanalysis at the Toronto Institute for Psychoanalysis.

He is also consistently rated as one of the best lecturers at the University of Toronto, often with over 90% of students willing to retake his courses in the ASSU Anti-calendar student survey.

== Early life and education ==
Toneatto completed his Bachelor of Science in 1980 in psychology at McMaster University and received his Ph.D. in clinical psychology from McGill University in 1987. Between 1987 and 2010 he was a research scientist at the Centre for Addiction and Mental Health (formerly the Addiction Research Foundation). He has published over 100 peer-reviewed articles and book chapters since then. He currently resides in Toronto with his family.

== Centre for Buddhism & Psychology ==
Toneatto is Director of the Centre for Buddhism & Psychology within New College at the University of Toronto. The Centre for Buddhism and Psychology is intended to serve as a resource for those interested in the burgeoning academic interest in this area of inquiry. In recent years, there has been a sustained interest on the part of academics, scholars, clinicians and students in the merits of investigating the mutual contributions of western psychological science and Buddhist psychology. This has been most evident in the widespread public interest in mindfulness meditation as an intervention for a wide array of medical and emotional disorders. Activities include a yearly undergraduate conference called Mind Matters, student journal (Upaya), and academic conferences and workshops.

== See also ==
- Mindfulness (psychology)
