= Deportivo Morón =

Argentine football club

- Full name: Club Deportivo Morón
- Nicknames: El Gallo; El Gallito
- Founded: 20 June 1947; 78 years ago
- Ground: Estadio Nuevo Francisco Urbano; Morón, Buenos Aires
- Capacity: 32,000
- Chairman: Gabriel Mansilla
- Manager: Walter Otta
- League: Primera Nacional
- 2025: Primera Nacional Zone B, 4th of 18
- Website: deportivomoron.com.ar
Home colours	Away colours	Third colours

Club Deportivo Morón is an Argentine sports club located in the city of Morón, Buenos Aires. Deportivo Morón's football team currently plays in Primera B Nacional, the second division of the Argentine football league system.

The club was founded in 1947 under the name "Club Sportivo Morón". Three years later the club joined the AFA and began playing in "Tercera de Ascenso", (now Primera C Metropolitana). In 1952, the club changed its name to "Club Deportivo Morón", which has remained since.

Apart from football, other sports hosted in Deportivo Morón are artistic gymnastics, basketball, handball, martial arts, roller skating, swimming, volleyball, and yoga.

== History ==
The club was founded on June 20, 1947, under the name "Club Sportivo Morón" ("Deportivo Manuel Belgrano" had been one of the names initially proposed) after a meeting held at "Bar de Volpi". One of its founding members, Filiberto Ferrante, was elected as the first president of the institution. Four years later the club joined the AFA registering to play in Primera D Metropolitana, the last division of the Argentine football league system.

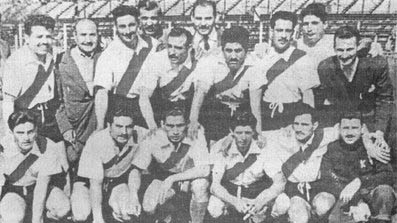
The squad that won its first title, the 1955 Primera D championship, still wearing the diagonal red sash

The team started competing in official tournaments in 1952, finishing in the penultimate position. The first shirt worn was white with a red diagonal sash (similar to River Plate shirt), then switched to white with a horizontal band. As the club did not have a field, the mayor of Morón Partido gave the club land located on Almirante Brown street, where the club would build its facilities. In 1955 Morón promoted to Primera C, where the team debuted in April 1956, beating Brown de Adrogué 5–3.

Deportivo Morón won its second title in 1959, the Primera C championship therefore promoting to Primera B (the second division by then), after winning 28 games with only 2 defeats in 34 matches. While playing in second division, the club built new concrete grandstands of its stadium. In 1968, Morón won the "Torneo Reclasificación", promoting to the top division, Primera División along with Santa Fe team Unión. Nevertheless, Morón made a poor campaign in the 1969 Primera championship, being relegated after finishing penultimate.

In 1980 Deportivo Morón won its second Primera C title after beating Deportivo Merlo 4–2. When the Primera B Nacional was established by AFA in 1986, Morón did not qualify to play that tournament so the team participated in Primera B Metropolitana (the other division created that year). On April 14, 1990 Morón won the 198990 Primera B Metro title and therefore promoted to Nacional B after beating Defensores de Belgrano 2–0. That was the 5th promotion achieved by the club since its foundation. The team, coached by Salvador Daniele, won 16 matches and lost 4. Morón remained in the division until it was relegated after the 1999–2000 season.

After a great campaign during the 2016–17 season in Primera B Metro where the team crowned champion, Morón promoted to the second division after totalising 66 points (8 more than Deportivo Riestra, 2nd) with 17 wins and 4 losses in 36 matches. In 2017, the Gallo also reached the 2016–17 Copa Argentina semifinal where it lost to River Plate.

== Players ==
=== Current squad ===
As of 14 July 2022

Note: Flags indicate national team as defined under FIFA eligibility rules; some limited exceptions apply. Players may hold more than one non-FIFA nationality.

No.	Pos.	Nation	Player
1	GK	ARG	Bruno Galván
2	DF	ARG	Cristian Paz
3	DF	ARG	Lucas Angelini
4	DF	ARG	Cristian Broggi
5	MF	ARG	Santiago Úbeda (loan from Sol de America)
6	DF	ARG	Lucas Abascia
7	FW	ARG	Santiago Sala
8	MF	ARG	Gastón González
9	FW	ARG	Ramiro Fergonzi
10	MF	ARG	Leandro Cabrera
11	MF	ARG	Gonzalo Salega
12	GK	ARG	Dante Monzón
13	GK	ARG	Juan Martín Rojas

No.	Pos.	Nation	Player
14	DF	ARG	Damián Adín (loan from Dock Sud)
15	FW	ARG	Alan Schönfeld
16	MF	ARG	Matías Ledesma
18	MF	ARG	Javier Bayk
19	FW	ARG	Tobías Zárate (loan from Vélez)
20	FW	ARG	Matías Córdoba (on loan from Talleres)
27	DF	ARG	Leonel Bontempo
28	FW	ARG	Leonardo Ramos
32	MF	ARG	Santiago Coronel
33	FW	ARG	Matías Gómez
34	FW	ARG	Mateo Levato
36	DF	ARG	Mariano Bracamonte

== Titles ==
- Primera B (2): 1989–90, 2016–17
- Primera C (2): 1959, 1980
- Primera D (1): 1955
