= 2019–20 Club Atlético Platense season =

Association football season

Platense
2019–20 season
- President: Fernando Wendt
- Manager: Fernando Ruiz
- Stadium: Estadio Ciudad de Vicente López
- Top goalscorer: League: Alfredo Ramírez (2); All: Alfredo Ramírez (2)

The 2019–20 season is Platense's second consecutive season in the second division of Argentine football, Primera B Nacional.

The season generally covers the period from 1 July 2019 to 30 June 2020.

== Review ==
=== Pre-season ===
Diego Tonetto formalised his departure to Deportivo Morón on 10 June 2019, while Gastón Suso's arrival from Atlético de Rafaela was agreed on 14 June. Gonzalo Bazán was the second name through the door, signing from Gimnasia y Esgrima (M) on 19 June. 22 June saw Joaquín Susvielles join from Almagro and Cristian Tarragona leave for Patronato. Platense loaned Manuel Capasso from Aldosivi on 25 June. In the final week of the month, Fernando Ruiz oversaw the outgoings of Abel Luciatti (San Martín (T), Gustavo Toranzo (Berazategui) and Ezequiel Gallegos (Gimnasia y Esgrima (J). Jonathan Bustos was also released after rejecting a new deal. Matías Tissera came on loan from Newell's Old Boys on 1 July, the same date that Franco Chiviló headed off to Flandria.

Daniel Vega (UAI Urquiza) and Nicolás Lugli (San Miguel) departed on 2 July. A double announcement, on 5 July, saw the incomings of Alfredo Ramírez, from Central Córdoba, and Luciano Recalde, from Rosario Central, confirmed. Platense met Independiente in a pre-season friendly on 6 July, initially playing out a goalless draw before beating the Primera División team in encounter two thanks to a goal from Gianluca Pugliese. Flandria were dispatched in back-to-back exhibition matches on 13 July, as Pugliese notched his second off-season goal alongside Tomás Luján's brace. 17 July saw San Martín (B) beaten 1–0 and 3–1 in pre-season matches; which replaced a Huracán cancellation. Javier Rossi moved to Platense from Central Córdoba on 18 July.

On 20 July, Platense suffered their first defeats of the preparation period as UAI Urquiza put three past them across two games. There was one win apiece in friendlies with Banfield Reserves on 23 July, with new player Gonzalo Bazán scoring Platense's winner. Roberto Bochi arrived to Platense from Alvarado on 25 July. They were planning to face Deportivo Armenio on 26 July, though that was later cancelled. Platense beat Gimnasia y Esgrima (LP) in a friendly fixture on 27 July. On 9 August, Platense played their final exhibition versus Boca Juniors Reserves - losing 2–1 and 3–2. Cristian Marcial was signed on loan from Racing Club on 15 August.

=== August ===
Platense began their Primera B Nacional with three points on the road against Ferro Carril Oeste on 20 August, after a goal from Facundo Curuchet was followed by a Cristian Bordacahar own-goal. A second successive victory arrived on 25 August over Estudiantes (RC), as an Alfredo Ramírez double preceded a goal from Joaquín Susvielles.

=== September ===
Platense lost their winning streak, though remained undefeated, following a draw away from home versus Nueva Chicago.

== Squad ==
Squad No.	Nationality	Name	Position(s)	Date of Birth (age)	Signed from
Goalkeepers
	Argentina	Nahuel Clavero	GK	4 June 1996 (age 30)	Academy
	Argentina	Jorge De Olivera	GK	21 August 1982 (age 44)	Deportivo Pasto
	Argentina	Andrés Desábato	GK	30 March 1990 (age 36)	Vélez Sarsfield
Defenders
	Argentina	Emanuel Bocchino	CB	9 March 1988 (age 38)	Blooming
	Argentina	Franco Cabral	DF	13 August 1994 (age 32)	Academy
	Argentina	Manuel Capasso	CB	19 April 1996 (age 30)	Aldosivi (loan)
	Argentina	Juan Infante	LB	7 January 1996 (age 30)	Academy
	Argentina	Nahuel Iribarren	CB	2 February 1988 (age 38)	Fernando Cáceres
	Argentina	Darío Leguiza	DF	23 February 1993 (age 33)	Academy
	Argentina	Cristian Marcial	DF	10 January 1996 (age 30)	Racing Club (loan)
	Argentina	Nicolás Morgantini	RB	11 September 1994 (age 32)	Academy
	Argentina	Luciano Recalde	CB	12 August 1995 (age 31)	Rosario Central
	Argentina	Gastón Suso	CB	12 March 1991 (age 35)	Atlético de Rafaela
	Argentina	Facundo Szarko	DF	3 July 1998 (age 28)	Academy
Midfielders
	Argentina	Franco Baldassarra	RM	29 September 1998 (age 28)	Academy
	Argentina	Gonzalo Bazán	LM	5 May 1989 (age 37)	Gimnasia y Esgrima (M)
	Argentina	Roberto Bochi	CM	6 July 1987 (age 39)	Alvarado
	Argentina	Elías Borrego	AM	19 July 1990 (age 36)	Atlético Venezuela
	Argentina	Emanuel Carreira	MF	21 May 1987 (age 39)	Colegiales
	Argentina	Hernán Lamberti	RM	3 May 1984 (age 42)	Central Córdoba
	Argentina	Patricio Pérez	MF	2000	Academy
	Argentina	Alfredo Ramírez	AM	19 February 1987 (age 39)	Central Córdoba
	Argentina	Marcelo Vega	RM	16 September 1986 (age 40)	Almirante Brown
	Argentina	Emiliano Villarreal	MF	22 April 1996 (age 30)	Academy
Forwards
	Argentina	Facundo Curuchet	CF	21 February 1990 (age 36)	Independiente Rivadavia
	Argentina	Tomás Luján	FW	28 January 2000 (age 26)	Academy
	Argentina	Gianluca Pugliese	FW	7 March 1997 (age 29)	Academy
	Argentina	Javier Rossi	FW	4 November 1982 (age 44)	Central Córdoba
	Argentina	Joaquín Susvielles	FW	28 February 1991 (age 35)	Almagro
	Argentina	Matías Tissera	FW	6 September 1996 (age 30)	Newell's Old Boys (loan)
	Argentina	Cristian Zarco	FW	20 April 1996 (age 30)	Academy
Out on loan					Loaned to
	Argentina	Nicolás Lugli	FW	9 July 1996 (age 30)	San Miguel

== Transfers ==
Domestic transfer windows:
3 July 2019 to 24 September 2019
20 January 2020 to 19 February 2020.

=== Transfers in ===
Date from	Position	Nationality	Name	From	Ref.
3 July 2019 (Note: Deal agreed on 14 June 2019)	CB	Argentina	Gastón Suso	Atlético de Rafaela	
3 July 2019 (Note: Deal agreed on 19 June 2019)	LM	Argentina	Gonzalo Bazán	Gimnasia y Esgrima (M)	
3 July 2019 (Note: Deal agreed on 22 June 2019)	FW	Argentina	Joaquín Susvielles	Almagro	
5 July 2019	AM	Argentina	Alfredo Ramírez	Central Córdoba	
5 July 2019	CB	Argentina	Luciano Recalde	Rosario Central	
18 July 2019	FW	Argentina	Javier Rossi	Central Córdoba	
25 July 2019	CM	Argentina	Roberto Bochi	Alvarado	

=== Transfers out ===
Date from	Position	Nationality	Name	To	Ref.
30 June 2019 (Note: Announced on 25 June 2019)	LM	Argentina	Jonathan Bustos	Released	
3 July 2019 (Note: Deal agreed on 10 June 2019)	LM	Argentina	Diego Tonetto	Deportivo Morón	
3 July 2019 (Note: Deal agreed on 22 June 2019)	CF	Argentina	Cristian Tarragona	Patronato	
3 July 2019 (Note: Deal agreed on 25 June 2019)	CB	Argentina	Abel Luciatti	San Martín (T)	
3 July 2019 (Note: Deal agreed on 27 June 2019)	CB	Argentina	Gustavo Toranzo	Berazategui	
3 July 2019 (Note: Deal agreed on 28 June 2019)	DF	Argentina	Ezequiel Gallegos	Gimnasia y Esgrima (J)	
3 July 2019 (Note: Deal agreed on 1 July 2019)	CM	Argentina	Franco Chiviló	Flandria	
3 July 2019 (Note: Deal agreed on 2 July 2019)	RW	Argentina	Daniel Vega	UAI Urquiza	

=== Loans in ===
Start date	Position	Nationality	Name	From	End date	Ref.
3 July 2019 (Note: Deal agreed on 25 June 2019)	CB	Argentina	Manuel Capasso	Aldosivi	30 June 2020	
3 July 2019 (Note: Deal agreed on 1 July 2019)	FW	Argentina	Matías Tissera	Newell's Old Boys	30 June 2020	
15 August 2019	DF	Argentina	Cristian Marcial	Racing Club	30 June 2020	

=== Loans out ===
Start date	Position	Nationality	Name	To	End date	Ref.
3 July 2019 (Note: Deal agreed on 2 July 2019)	FW	Argentina	Nicolás Lugli	San Miguel	30 June 2020	

== Friendlies ==
=== Pre-season ===
Platense revealed their initial pre-season schedule 5 July 2019, which notably included matches with Primera División duo Independiente and Huracán. They'd also meet Flandria, UAI Urquiza and Banfield Reserves. The encounter with Huracán was cancelled on 15 July, with Platense setting a fixture with Burzaco-based San Martín instead. They were also set to play Deportivo Armenio. Platense would travel to La Plata to play Gimnasia y Esgrima (LP) on 27 July, before facing Boca Juniors Reserves in early August.

Win Draw Loss

6 July 2019 Friendly	Independiente	0–0	Platense	Ezeiza, Argentina
		Platense; Marca; 60 min. match		Stadium: Complejo Deportivo de Ezeiza; Attendance: 0 (Note: Behind closed doors.)

6 July 2019 Friendly	Independiente	0–1	Platense	Ezeiza, Argentina
		Platense; Marca; 60 min. match	G. Pugliese	Stadium: Complejo Deportivo de Ezeiza; Attendance: 0 (Note: Behind closed doors.)

13 July 2019 Friendly	Flandria	0–1	Platense	Ezeiza, Argentina
		Platense; Grupo La Provincia; 70 min. match	J. Susvielles	Stadium: Complejo Deportivo de Ezeiza

13 July 2019 Friendly	Flandria	0–3	Platense	Ezeiza, Argentina
		Platense; Grupo La Provincia	T. Luján; G. Pugliese	Stadium: Complejo Deportivo de Ezeiza

17 July 2019 Friendly	Huracán	Cancelled	Platense	Buenos Aires, Argentina
				Stadium: Estadio Tomás Adolfo Ducó

17 July 2019 Friendly	Platense	1–0	San Martín (B)	Florida Este, Argentina
	J. Susvielles	Platense; Olé; 60 min. match		Stadium: Estadio Ciudad de Vicente López

17 July 2019 Friendly	Platense	3–1	San Martín (B)	Florida Este, Argentina
	P. Pérez; G. Pugliese; T. Luján	Platense; Olé; 60 min. match	Goal	Stadium: Estadio Ciudad de Vicente López

20 July 2019 Friendly	UAI Urquiza	1–0	Platense	Buenos Aires, Argentina
	J. Rodríguez	Platense; Mundo Ascenso		Stadium: Estadio Monumental de Villa Lynch

20 July 2019 Friendly	UAI Urquiza	2–1	Platense	Buenos Aires, Argentina
	I. Paredes; E. Vidal	Platense; Mundo Ascenso	F. Curuchet	Stadium: Estadio Monumental de Villa Lynch

23 July 2019 Friendly	Banfield Reserves	0–1	Platense	Luis Guillón, Argentina
		Platense; IAM Noticias; 45 min. match	G. Bazán	Stadium: Campo de Deportes Alfredo Palacios

23 July 2019 Friendly	Banfield Reserves	1–0	Platense	Luis Guillón, Argentina
	J. Eseiza	Platense; Mundo Ascenso; 45 min. match		Stadium: Campo de Deportes Alfredo Palacios

26 July 2019 Friendly	Deportivo Armenio	Cancelled	Platense	Argentina

27 July 2019 Friendly	Gimnasia y Esgrima (LP)	0–2	Platense	La Plata, Argentina
		Platense; Mundo Ascenso	A. Ramírez	Stadium: Estancia Chica; Attendance: 0 (Note: Behind closed doors.)

9 August 2019 Friendly	Boca Juniors Reserves	2–1	Platense	Ezeiza, Argentina
09:30 GMT-3	Goal	Platense; Olé; 70 min. match	G. Bazán	Stadium: Predio Entrenamiento Boca Juniors

9 August 2019 Friendly	Boca Juniors Reserves	3–2	Platense	Ezeiza, Argentina
	Goal	Platense; Olé; 70 min. match	P. Pérez; J. Rossi	Stadium: Predio Entrenamiento Boca Juniors

== Competitions ==
=== Primera B Nacional ===
==== Results summary ====
Overall								Home						Away					
Pld	W	D	L	GF	GA	GD	Pts	W	D	L	GF	GA	GD	W	D	L	GF	GA	GD
3	2	1	0	6	2	+4	7	1	0	0	3	1	+2	1	1	0	3	1	+2

Last updated: 4 September 2019.
Source: Soccerway

==== Matches ====
The fixtures for the 2019–20 league season were announced on 1 August 2019, with a new format of split zones being introduced. Platense were drawn in Zone A.

Win Draw Loss

19 August 2019 1	Ferro Carril Oeste	0–2	Platense	Buenos Aires, Argentina
21:05 GMT-3		Saavedra Online; Soccerway	F. Curuchet 55'; C. Bordacahar 57' (o.g.)	Stadium: Estadio Arquitecto Ricardo Etcheverry; Referee: Nazareno Arasa (Argentina)

25 August 2019 2	Platense	3–1	Estudiantes (RC)	Florida Este, Argentina
16:00 GMT-3	A. Ramírez 21', 51'; J. Susvielles 55'	Platense; La Voz del Interior; Soccerway	J. Ferreira 33'	Stadium: Estadio Ciudad de Vicente López; Referee: Yamil Possi (Argentina)

3 September 2019 3	Nueva Chicago	1–1	Platense	Buenos Aires, Argentina
17:05 GMT-3	J. Fleita 69'	Platense; TyC Sports; Soccerway	G. Suso 57'	Stadium: Estadio Nueva Chicago; Referee: Pablo Dóvalo (Argentina)

8 September 2019 4	Platense	–	Guillermo Brown	Florida Este, Argentina
16:00 GMT-3				Stadium: Estadio Ciudad de Vicente López

== Squad statistics ==
=== Appearances and goals ===
No.	Pos.	Nationality	Name	League		Cup		League Cup		Continental		Other		Total		Discipline		Ref
No.	Pos.	Nationality	Name	Apps	Goals	Apps	Goals	Apps	Goals	Apps	Goals	Apps	Goals	Apps	Goals	Yellow card	Red card	Ref
–	GK	Argentina	Nahuel Clavero	0	0	—		—		—		0	0	0	0	0	0	
–	GK	Argentina	Jorge De Olivera	3	0	—		—		—		0	0	3	0	0	0	
–	GK	Argentina	Andrés Desábato	0	0	—		—		—		0	0	0	0	0	0	
–	CB	Argentina	Emanuel Bocchino	0	0	—		—		—		0	0	0	0	0	0	
–	DF	Argentina	Franco Cabral	0	0	—		—		—		0	0	0	0	0	0	
–	CB	Argentina	Manuel Capasso	3	0	—		—		—		0	0	3	0	1	0	
–	LB	Argentina	Juan Infante	3	0	—		—		—		0	0	3	0	0	0	
–	CB	Argentina	Nahuel Iribarren	0	0	—		—		—		0	0	0	0	0	0	
–	DF	Argentina	Darío Leguiza	0	0	—		—		—		0	0	0	0	0	0	
–	DF	Argentina	Cristian Marcial	0	0	—		—		—		0	0	0	0	0	0	
–	RB	Argentina	Nicolás Morgantini	3	0	—		—		—		0	0	3	0	1	0	
–	CB	Argentina	Luciano Recalde	0(2)	0	—		—		—		0	0	0(2)	0	0	0	
–	CB	Argentina	Gastón Suso	3	1	—		—		—		0	0	3	1	0	0	
–	DF	Argentina	Facundo Szarko	0	0	—		—		—		0	0	0	0	0	0	
–	RM	Argentina	Franco Baldassarra	0	0	—		—		—		0	0	0	0	0	0	
–	LM	Argentina	Gonzalo Bazán	3	0	—		—		—		0	0	3	0	0	0	
–	CM	Argentina	Roberto Bochi	3	0	—		—		—		0	0	3	0	1	0	
–	AM	Argentina	Elías Borrego	0(1)	0	—		—		—		0	0	0(1)	0	0	0	
–	MF	Argentina	Emanuel Carreira	0	0	—		—		—		0	0	0	0	0	0	
–	RM	Argentina	Hernán Lamberti	3	0	—		—		—		0	0	3	0	2	0	
–	MF	Argentina	Patricio Pérez	0	0	—		—		—		0	0	0	0	0	0	
–	AM	Argentina	Alfredo Ramírez	3	2	—		—		—		0	0	3	2	0	0	
–	RM	Argentina	Marcelo Vega	0(2)	0	—		—		—		0	0	0(2)	0	0	0	
–	MF	Argentina	Emiliano Villarreal	0	0	—		—		—		0	0	0	0	0	0	
–	CF	Argentina	Facundo Curuchet	1(1)	1	—		—		—		0	0	1(1)	1	0	0	
–	FW	Argentina	Nicolás Lugli	0	0	—		—		—		0	0	0	0	0	0	
–	FW	Argentina	Tomás Luján	0	0	—		—		—		0	0	0	0	0	0	
–	FW	Argentina	Gianluca Pugliese	0	0	—		—		—		0	0	0	0	0	0	
–	FW	Argentina	Javier Rossi	0(2)	0	—		—		—		0	0	0(2)	0	0	0	
–	FW	Argentina	Joaquín Susvielles	3	1	—		—		—		0	0	3	1	1	0	
–	FW	Argentina	Matías Tissera	2(1)	0	—		—		—		0	0	2(1)	0	0	0	
–	FW	Argentina	Cristian Zarco	0	0	—		—		—		0	0	0	0	0	0	
Own goals				—	0	—		—		—		—	0	—	0	—	—	—

Statistics accurate as of 4 September 2019.

=== Goalscorers ===
Rank	Pos	No.	Nat	Name	League	Cup	League Cup	Continental	Other	Total	Ref
1	CF	–	Argentina	Alfredo Ramírez	2	—	—	—	0	2	
2	CF	–	Argentina	Facundo Curuchet	1	—	—	—	0	1	
2	FW	–	Argentina	Joaquín Susvielles	1	—	—	—	0	1	
2	CB	–	Argentina	Gastón Suso	1	—	—	—	0	1	
Own goals					1	—	—	—	0	1	
Totals					6	—	—	—	0	6	—
