= Alfredo =

Alfredo (Italian pronunciation: [alˈfreːdo], Spanish pronunciation: [alˈfɾeðo]) is a common Italian, Galician, Portuguese and Spanish language personal name. It is derived from the Anglo-Saxon name Alfred.

== Given name ==
=== Artists and musicians ===
- Aldo Sambrell (1931–2010), Spanish actor, born Alfredo Sanchez Brell
- Alfredo Armas Alfonzo (1921–1990), Venezuelan writer
- Alfredo Bryce (born 1939), Peruvian writer
- Alfredo Cardona Peña (1917–1995), Costa Rican journalist, writer, biographer, poet, and essayist
- Alfredo Casella (1883–1947), Italian composer, pianist and conductor
- Alfredo Casero (born 1962), Argentine musician, actor and comedian
- Alfredo Castro (born 1955), Chilean actor
- Alfredo Catalani (1854–1893), Italian operatic composer
- Alfredo Filippini (1924–2020), Italian sculptor, painter and illustrator
- Alfredo Gil (1915–1999), Mexican singer
- Alfredo Kraus (1927–1999), Spanish operatic tenor
- Alfred Molina (born 1953), English-American actor born Alfredo Molina
- Alfredo "Al" Pacino (born 1940), American actor

=== Politicians ===
- Albee Benitez (born 1966), Filipino-American businessman and politician
- Alfredo Baldomir (1884–1948), President of Uruguay, soldier and architect
- Alfredo Baquerizo (1859–1951), President of Ecuador
- Alfredo Cachia Zammit (1890–1960), Maltese philanthropist and politician
- Alfredo Caruana Gatto (1868–1926), Maltese lawyer, politician and naturalist
- Alfredo Cristiani (born 1947), President of El Salvador
- Alfredo del Mazo Maza (born 1975), Mexican politician
- Alfredo Junqueira Dala, Angolan politician
- Alfredo Maia (born 1962), Portuguese politician
- Alfredo Lim (1929–2020), Chinese-Filipino politician and former mayor of the city of Manila
- Alfredo Moreno Charme (born 1956), Chilean diplomat and politician
- Alfredo Moreno Echeverría (born 1988), Chilean politician
- Alfredo Ovando Candía (1918–1982), Bolivian president
- Alfredo Palacio (born 1939), President of Ecuador (2005–2007)
- Alfredo Palacios (1880–1965), Argentine politician
- Alfredo Oscar Saint-Jean (1926–1987), acting President of Argentina
- Alfredo Sirkis (1950–2020), Brazilian politician and writer
- Alfredo Stroessner (1912–2006), President of Paraguay
- Alfredo Zayas y Alfonso (1861–1934), President of Cuba

=== Sportsmen ===
- Alfredo (1946–2025), Brazilian footballer born as Alfredo Mostarda Filho
- Alfredo II (1920–1997), Brazilian footballer born as Alfredo Ramos dos Santos
- Alfredo Ábalos (born 1986), Argentine footballer
- Alfredo Aceves (born 1982), Mexican baseball player
- Alfredo Aglietti (born 1970), Italian footballer and manager
- Alfredo Aguilar (born 1988), Paraguayan goaltender
- Alfredo Álvarez Calderón (1918–2001), Peruvian diver
- Alfredo Amézaga (born 1978), Mexican baseball player
- Alfredo Anderson (born 1978), Panamanian footballer
- Alfredo Bifulco (born 1997), Italian footballer
- Alfredo Binda (1902–1986), Italian world champion cyclist
- Alfredo Bogarín (born 1936), Paraguayan fencer
- Alfredo Bóia (born 1975), Portuguese footballer
- Alfredo Brilhante da Costa (1904–1980), Brazilian footballer
- Al Cabrera (1881–1964), Spanish baseball player born Alfredo Cabrera
- Alfredo Álvarez Calderón (1918–2001), Peruvian diver
- Alfredo Cariello (born 1979), Italian footballer
- Alfredo Carmona (born 1971), Peruvian footballer
- Alfredo Carrillo (born 1976), Paraguayan swimmer
- Alfredo Castro (born 1962), Portuguese goalkeeper
- Alfredo Challenger (born 1979), Caymanian footballer
- Alfredo del Águila (1935–2018), Mexican footballer
- Alfredo Devincenzi (1907–?), Italian-Argentine footballer
- Alfredo Di Stéfano (1926–2014), Argentine footballer and coach
- Alfredo Donnarumma (born 1990), Italian footballer
- Alfredo Esteves (born 1976), Portuguese-East Timorese footballer and manager
- Alfredo Fígaro (born 1984), Dominican baseball pitcher
- Alfredo Foni (1911–1985), Italian footballer and coach
- Alfredo Francisco Martins (1992), Brazilian footballer
- Alfredo Frausto (born 1983), Mexican footballer
- Alfredo González Tahuilán (born 1980), Mexican footballer
- Alfredo Griffin (born 1957), Dominican baseball player and coach
- Alfredo Guzmán (born 1943), Mexican swimmer
- Alfredo Jesus da Silva, Portuguese footballer
- Alfredo Lucero (born 1979), Argentine cyclist
- Alfredo Marte (born 1989), Dominican baseball player
- Alfredo Mazacotte (born 1987), Paraguayan footballer
- Alfredo Mejía (born 1990), Honduran footballer
- Alfredo Mendoza (born 1963), Paraguayan footballer
- Alfredo Morales (born 1990), German footballer
- Alfredo Morelos (born 1996), Colombian footballer
- Alfredo Moreno (1980–2021), Argentine footballer
- Alfredo Moreno Caño (born 1981), Spanish track cyclist
- Alfredo Mostarda Filho (born 1946), Brazilian footballer
- Alfredo Omar Tena (born 1985), Mexican footballer
- Alfredo Ortuño (born 1991), Spanish footballer
- Alfredo Pacheco (1982–2015), Salvadoran footballer
- Alfredo Padilla (born 1989), Colombian footballer
- Alfredo Pedraza (born 2000), Spanish footballer
- Al Pedrique (born 1960), Venezuelan baseball player and coach born Alfredo José Pedrique Garcia
- Alfredo Pereira (born 1992), Portuguese acrobatic gymnast
- Alfredo Pérez (born 1952), Venezuelan boxer
- Alfredo Pián (1912–1990), Argentinian racing driver
- Alfredo Pussetto (born 1994), Argentine footballer
- Alfredo Quesada (born 1949), Peruvian footballer
- Alfredo Quintana (1988–2021), Portuguese handballer
- Alfredo Ramírez (born 1988), Argentine footballer
- Alfredo Ramos (1924–2012), Brazilian footballer
- Alfredo Ramúa (born 1986), Argentine footballer
- Alfredo Roberts (born 1965), American football player and coach
- Alfredo Rojas (1937–2023), Argentine footballer
- Alfredo Rojas (born 1991), Peruvian footballer
- Alfredo Saldívar (born 1990), Mexican goalkeeper
- Alfredo Santaelena (born 1967), Spanish footballer
- Alfredo dos Santos (1920–1997), Brazilian footballer
- Alfredo Shahanga (born 1965), Tanzanian long-distance runner
- Alfredo Simón (born 1981), Dominican baseball pitcher
- Alfredo Stephens (born 1994), Panamanian footballer
- Alfredo Talavera (born 1982), Mexican goalkeeper
- Alfredo Tena (born 1956), Mexican footballer
- Alfredo Alves Tinoco (1904–1975), Brazilian footballer
- Alfredo Torres (1935–2022), Mexican footballer
- Alfredo Valente (born 1980), Canadian soccer player
- Alfredo Valentini (born 1946), Sammarinese sports shooter
- Alfredo Virginio Cano (born 1982), Argentine footballer
- Babù (born 1980), Brazilian footballer born as Alfredo Manzano Gutierrez
- Fredy (born 1990), Angolan footballer born as Alfredo Kulembe Ribeiro
- Freddy Gonzalez (born 1978), Filipino footballer born as Alfredo Fernando Razón Gonzalez
- Marcão (born 1986), Brazilian footballer born as Alfredo Marcos da Silva Junior
- Máyor (born 1984), Spanish footballer born as Alfredo Juan Mayordomo
- Noronha (1918–2003), Brazilian footballer born as Alfredo Eduardo Barreto de Freitas Noronha

=== Others ===
- Alfredo Alonso, Cuban-born media executive with Clear Channel Radio
- Alfredo Azancot (1872–?), Chilean-based Portuguese architect
- Alfredo Bonanno (1937–2023), Italian conspiracy theorist
- Alfredo Cantu Gonzalez (1946–1968), American United States Marine Corps sergeant
- Alfredo Gonzalez (disambiguation), several people
- Alfredo Gutiérrez (disambiguation), several people
- Alfredo Hernández (disambiguation), several people
- Alfredo Jahn (1867–1940), Venezuelan civil engineer, botanist and geographer
- Alfredo Olivera (1908–?), Uruguayan chess player
- Alfredo Ottaviani (1890–1979), Italian cardinal of the Catholic Church
- Alfredo Pacini (1888–1967), Italian Cardinal of the Roman Catholic Church
- Alfredo Pascual (born 1948), Filipino businessman and former president of the University of the Philippines
- Alfredo Prieto (1965–2015), Salvadoran-American serial killer
- Alfredo Sánchez (disambiguation)
- Alfredo Torero (1930–2004), Peruvian anthropologist
- Alfredo Toro Hardy (born 1950), Venezuelan author, diplomat and public intellectual
- Alfredo Valente (1899–1973), Italian-American photographer
- Arkangel de la Muerte (1966–2018), Mexican luchador and wrestler born as Alfredo Pasillas

== See also ==
- Anthony Alfredo (born 1999), American racing driver
- Fettuccine Alfredo, an Italian pasta dish
