= Morganti =

Surname list

Morganti is a surname. Notable people with the surname include:

- Al Morganti (born 1953), American hockey analyst
- Emidio Morganti (born 1966), Italian soccer referee
- Fausta Morganti (1944–2021), San Marinese politician
- Raffaella Morganti (born 1958), Italian astronomer

== See also ==
- Morgantini
