= Freedo =

Freedo or variants may refer to

- Freedo (producer), German music producer
- Freedo, penguin cartoon mascot of Linux-libre, an operating system kernel and software package
- FreeDO, an emulator for the 3DO

== See also ==
- FreeDOS operating system
- Fredo given name
