= Morgantini =

Morgantini is an Italian surname. Notable people with the surname include:

- Jacques and Marcelle Morgantini (1924 – 2019) (1925 – 2007), French record producers
- Luisa Morgantini (born 1940), Italian former Member of the European Parliament
- Nicolás Morgantini (born 1994), Argentine professional footballer

== See also ==
- Morganti
