= Marcelo Vega =

Marcelo Vega may refer to:

- Marcelo Vega (footballer, born 1971), Chilean footballer
- Marcelo Vega (footballer, born 1986), Argentine footballer

== See also ==
- Marcelo Veiga, Brazilian football manager and player
