= Franco Cabral =

Argentine footballer

Personal information
- Full name: Franco Lautaro Cabral
- Date of birth: 13 August 1994 (age 32)
- Place of birth: Benavídez, Argentina
- Position: Defender

Team information
- Current team: Real Pilar

Senior career*
Years	Team	Apps	(Gls)
2014–2019	Platense	36	(0)
2019–	Real Pilar	19	(0)
- * Club domestic league appearances and goals as of 11:47, 28 August 2020 (UTC)

Franco Lautaro Cabral (born 13 August 1994) is an Argentine professional footballer who plays as a defender for Real Pilar.

== Career ==
Cabral began his career with Platense. He made six professional appearances throughout the 2014 Primera B Metropolitana campaign, all of which were off the substitutes bench. Cabral's starting debut arrived on 20 March 2016 against Estudiantes, which was one of thirty matches he featured in across the 2016 and 2016–17 seasons. After no further appearances for Platense at first-team level, Cabral departed in July 2019 to Real Pilar of Primera C Metropolitana. He appeared nineteen times in 2019–20.

== Career statistics ==
As of 28 August 2020.

Appearances and goals by club, season and competition
Club	Season	League			Cup		League Cup		Continental		Other		Total	
Club	Season	Division	Apps	Goals	Apps	Goals	Apps	Goals	Apps	Goals	Apps	Goals	Apps	Goals
Platense	2014	Primera B Metropolitana	6	0	0	0	—		—		0	0	6	0
Platense	2015	Primera B Metropolitana	0	0	0	0	—		—		0	0	0	0
Platense	2016	Primera B Metropolitana	8	0	0	0	—		—		0	0	8	0
Platense	2016–17	Primera B Metropolitana	22	0	0	0	—		—		0	0	22	0
Platense	2017–18	Primera B Metropolitana	0	0	0	0	—		—		0	0	0	0
Platense	2018–19	Primera B Nacional	0	0	0	0	—		—		0	0	0	0
Platense	Total		36	0	0	0	—		—		0	0	36	0
Real Pilar	2019–20	Primera C Metropolitana	19	0	0	0	—		—		0	0	19	0
Career total			55	0	0	0	—		—		0	0	55	0
