= Alfredo Hernández (disambiguation) =

Alfredo Hernández is an American drummer

Alfredo Hernández may also refer to:

- Alfredo Hernández (footballer, born 1935) (1935–2003), Mexican football midfielder
- Alfredo Hernández (footballer, born 1951) (1951–2021), Mexican footballer
- Alfredo Hernández Raigosa (1963–2022), Mexican politician
- Alfredo Hernández (rower) (born 1941), Cuban rower
- Alfredo Barba Hernández (born 1944), Mexican politician
- Alfredo Fuentes Hernández, Colombian diplomat, lawyer and economist
- Alfredo Rivadeneyra Hernández (born 1971), Mexican politician
