= Darío Leguiza =

Argentine footballer

Personal information
- Full name: Darío Sebastián Leguiza
- Date of birth: 23 February 1993 (age 33)
- Place of birth: Buenos Aires, Argentina
- Height: 1.71 m (5 ft 7 in)
- Position: Defender

Team information
- Current team: Real Pilar

Senior career*
Years	Team	Apps	(Gls)
2014–2019	Platense	42	(1)
2019–2020	Fénix	20	(0)
2022–	Real Pilar	62	(1)
- * Club domestic league appearances and goals as of 19:53, 17 November 2024 (UTC)

Darío Sebastián Leguiza (born 23 February 1993) is an Argentine professional footballer who plays as a defender for Real Pilar.

== Career ==
Leguiza made his breakthrough into senior football with Platense. He made his professional bow in a home defeat to Almirante Brown on 17 February 2015, which was followed by ten further appearances in the 2015 Primera B Metropolitana; he had initially been an unused substitute in the Copa Argentina in 2014. Leguiza scored his first goal during his thirty-fifth appearance in May 2017, netting the only goal in a victory over Atlanta at the Estadio Ciudad de Vicente López. Platense won promotion in 2017–18 but Leguiza didn't feature competitively; though subsequently made his Primera B Nacional bow in August 2018 in a home loss versus Mitre.

Leguiza spent the 2019–20 campaign in Primera B Metropolitana with Fénix.

== Career statistics ==
As of 9 July 2020.

Appearances and goals by club, season and competition
Club	Season	League			Cup		Continental		Other		Total	
Club	Season	Division	Apps	Goals	Apps	Goals	Apps	Goals	Apps	Goals	Apps	Goals
Platense	2014	Primera B Metropolitana	0	0	0	0	—		0	0	0	0
Platense	2015	Primera B Metropolitana	11	0	0	0	—		0	0	11	0
Platense	2016	Primera B Metropolitana	10	0	0	0	—		0	0	10	0
Platense	2016–17	Primera B Metropolitana	20	1	0	0	—		1 (Note: Appearance(s) in the Primera B Metropolitana play-offs)	0	21	1
Platense	2017–18	Primera B Metropolitana	0	0	0	0	—		0	0	0	0
Platense	2018–19	Primera B Nacional	1	0	0	0	—		0	0	1	0
Platense	Total		42	1	0	0	—		1	0	43	1
Fénix	2019–20	Primera B Metropolitana	20	0	0	0	—		0	0	20	0
Career total			62	1	0	0	—		1	0	63	1
