= Agustín Falótico =

Argentine professional footballer

Personal information
- Full name: Agustín Mateo Falótico
- Date of birth: 22 February 1998 (age 28)
- Place of birth: Argentina
- Position: Forward

Team information
- Current team: Deportivo Español

Youth career
- Deportivo Español

Senior career*
Years	Team	Apps	(Gls)
2018–	Deportivo Español	10	(1)
- * Club domestic league appearances and goals as of 07:52, 29 May 2019 (UTC)

Agustín Mateo Falótico (born 22 February 1998) is an Argentine professional footballer who plays as a forward for Deportivo Español.

== Career ==
Falótico, who holds Italian nationality, began his career in Argentina with Deportivo Español. He made his professional debut on 22 September 2018 during a goalless draw in Primera B Metropolitana to Flandria, with the forward replacing Nicolás Lugli after seventy-eight minutes. His opening start came in a home defeat to Barracas Central in the succeeding October, which preceded his first senior goal arriving during a 2–3 win away to Sacachispas on 13 April 2019.

== Career statistics ==
As of 29 May 2019.

Appearances and goals by club, season and competition
Club	Season	League			Cup		League Cup		Continental		Other		Total	
Club	Season	Division	Apps	Goals	Apps	Goals	Apps	Goals	Apps	Goals	Apps	Goals	Apps	Goals
Deportivo Español	2018–19	Primera B Metropolitana	10	1	0	0	—		—		0	0	10	1
Career total			10	1	0	0	—		—		0	0	10	1
