= Ezequiel Vidal (footballer, born 1987) =

Argentine footballer

Personal information
- Date of birth: 18 August 1987 (age 39)
- Place of birth: Buenos Aires, Argentina
- Height: 1.83 m (6 ft 0 in)
- Position: Forward

Team information
- Current team: UAI Urquiza

Senior career*
Years	Team	Apps	(Gls)
2006–2015	UAI Urquiza	191	(53)
2008–2009	→ Lugano (loan)	30	(8)
2016–2018	Talleres	56	(9)
2018–2019	Acassuso	32	(4)
2019–	UAI Urquiza	21	(3)
- * Club domestic league appearances and goals as of 17:24, 17 July 2020 (UTC)

Ezequiel Vidal (born 18 August 1987) is an Argentine professional footballer who plays as a forward for UAI Urquiza.

== Career ==
Vidal began his career with UAI Urquiza. He remained with them for nine years, featuring one hundred and ninety-one times and scoring fifty-three goals across three divisions; Primera D, Primera C and Primera B Metropolitana. His final season with UAI Urquiza was in 2015 when he made thirteen appearances. During his time with UAI Urquiza, Vidal spent time out on loan with Primera D team Lugano; he scored eight goals in thirty matches. In January 2016, Vidal joined Primera B Metropolitana side Talleres. He made his debut versus Platense on 5 February, with his first goal coming on 27 April against Defensores de Belgrano.

On 7 June 2018, Vidal signed for fellow Primera B Metropolitana team Acassuso. He departed after one season, having notched five goals in his time with the club. July 2019 saw Vidal rejoin UAI Urquiza.

== Career statistics ==
As of 17 July 2020.

Club statistics
Club	Season	League			Cup		League Cup		Continental		Other		Total	
Club	Season	Division	Apps	Goals	Apps	Goals	Apps	Goals	Apps	Goals	Apps	Goals	Apps	Goals
Talleres	2016	Primera B Metropolitana	15	2	1	0	—		—		0	0	16	2
Talleres	2016–17	Primera B Metropolitana	23	6	0	0	—		—		0	0	23	6
Talleres	2017–18	Primera B Metropolitana	18	1	0	0	—		—		1 (Note: Appearance(s) in Primera B Metropolitana play-offs)	0	19	1
Acassuso	2018–19	Primera B Metropolitana	32	4	0	0	—		—		2	1	34	5
UAI Urquiza	2019–20	Primera B Metropolitana	21	3	0	0	—		—		0	0	21	3
Career total			109	16	1	0	—		—		3	1	113	17

== Honours ==
UAI Urquiza

- Primera D Metropolitana: 2009–10
- Primera C Metropolitana: 2012–13
