= Manuel Capasso =

Argentine professional footballer

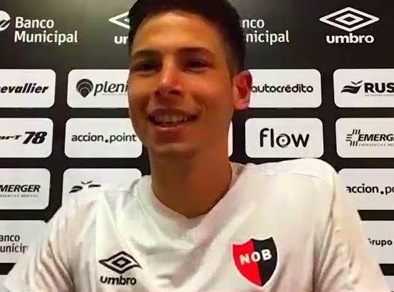
- Capasso in 2020

Personal information
- Full name: Manuel Vicente Capasso
- Date of birth: 19 April 1996 (age 30)
- Place of birth: Buenos Aires, Argentina
- Height: 1.88 m (6 ft 2 in)
- Position: Centre-back

Team information
- Current team: Atlas
- Number: 28

Youth career
- 2013–2015: Acassuso

Senior career*
Years	Team	Apps	(Gls)
2015–2018	Acassuso	88	(5)
2018–2019	Defensa y Justicia	0	(0)
2019–2020	Aldosivi	0	(0)
2019–2020	→ Platense (loan)	17	(2)
2020–2021	Newell's Old Boys	16	(1)
2022	Atlético Tucumán	30	(1)
2023–2025	Vasco da Gama	15	(2)
2024	→ Olimpia (loan)	29	(5)
2025	Olimpia	15	(0)
2026–	Atlas	29	(4)
- * Club domestic league appearances and goals as of 16 October 2026

Manuel Vicente Capasso (born 19 April 1996) is an Argentine professional footballer who plays as a centre-back for Liga MX club Atlas.

== Career ==
Acassuso were Capasso's opening career club, he joined them in 2013. He was promoted into their senior squad under manager Walter Otta during the 2015 Primera B Metropolitana, marking his professional debut with a late cameo off the substitutes bench against Platense on 17 July. Capasso scored the first goals of his career in November 2016, netting in consecutive league fixtures versus Deportivo Español and Deportivo Riestra. He left Acassuso at the end of 2017–18, having made eighty-nine appearances while scoring five times for the club. On 1 July 2018, Capasso was signed by Primera División side Defensa y Justicia.

After no matches in five months for Defensa y Justicia, Capasso terminated his contract in January 2019 to move to fellow Primera División team Aldosivi. He didn't appear competitively across the next seven months, subsequently leaving on loan in July 2019 to Primera B Nacional's Platense - the opponents of his career debut. He scored goals for them against Estudiantes and Agropecuario in sixteen appearances.

In February 2023, Capasso was transferred to the Brazilian Club Vasco da Gama.

== Career statistics ==
As of 6 October 2020.

Club statistics
Club	Season	League			Cup		League Cup		Continental		Other		Total	
Club	Season	Division	Apps	Goals	Apps	Goals	Apps	Goals	Apps	Goals	Apps	Goals	Apps	Goals
Acassuso	2015	Primera B Metropolitana	6	0	0	0	—		—		0	0	6	0
Acassuso	2016	Primera B Metropolitana	17	0	0	0	—		—		0	0	17	0
Acassuso	2016–17	Primera B Metropolitana	32	2	0	0	—		—		0	0	32	2
Acassuso	2017–18	Primera B Metropolitana	33	3	0	0	—		—		1 (Note: Appearance(s) in the Primera B Metropolitana play-offs)	0	34	3
Acassuso	Total		88	5	0	0	—		—		1	0	89	5
Defensa y Justicia	2018–19	Primera División	0	0	0	0	0	0	0	0	0	0	0	0
Aldosivi	2018–19	Primera División	0	0	0	0	0	0	—		0	0	0	0
Aldosivi	2019–20	Primera División	0	0	0	0	0	0	—		0	0	0	0
Aldosivi	Total		0	0	0	0	0	0	—		0	0	0	0
Platense (loan)	2019–20	Primera B Nacional	16	2	1	0	—		—		0	0	17	2
Career total			104	7	1	0	0	0	0	0	1	0	106	7
