= Juan Carlos Ecomba =

Equatoguinean football manager (b. 1967)

Personal information
- Full name: Juan Carlos Machín Dikombo
- Date of birth: 6 July 1967 (age 59)
- Place of birth: Spanish Guinea
- Position: Right winger

Youth career
- –1986: Nueva Chicago

Senior career*
| Years | Team | Apps | (Gls) |
| 1986–1987 | Nueva Chicago | ? | (?) |
| 1987–1988 | → Deportivo Riestra (loan) | ? | (?) |
| 1988–1989 | → JJ Urquiza (loan) | ? | (?) |
| 1989–1990 | Chacarita Juniors | ? | (?) |
| 1992–1993 | Lugano | ? | (?) |

Managerial career
- Defensores de Tablada (enfants)
- 2020: CF Canonja (youngest)
- * Club domestic league appearances and goals

Juan Carlos Machín Dikombo (born 6 July 1967), referred as Juan Carlos Ecomba, is an Equatorial Guinean football manager, referee and former player who played as a right winger. He served as referee for Benjamin federated matches in Catalonia.

Due to the civil wars in his natal country, he went into exile in Argentina, where he arrived in 1979. In this South American country, he played for Nueva Chicago, Deportivo Riestra, JJ Urquiza, Chacarita Juniors and Lugano.

== Personal life ==
According to an official gazette from Buenos Aires City Hall that dates back to 29 August 2000, Ecomba has acquired the Argentine nationality. He left Argentina in 2003 and now resides in Barcelona, Spain.

On 31 January 2008, Ecomba became a Spanish citizen.
