= Joaquín Susvielles =

Argentine footballer (born 1991)

Personal information
- Date of birth: 28 February 1991 (age 35)
- Place of birth: Santa Rosa, Argentina
- Height: 1.88 m (6 ft 2 in)
- Position: Forward

Team information
- Current team: Olimpo

Senior career*
Years	Team	Apps	(Gls)
2011	Atlético Santa Rosa		
2011–2012	Alvear FC	13	(0)
2012–2014	Villa Mitre	47	(28)
2014–2018	Olimpo	5	(0)
2015	→ Guillermo Brown (loan)	27	(2)
2016	→ Ferro Pico (loan)	11	(3)
2016–2017	→ Alvarado (loan)	24	(5)
2017–2018	Alvarado	20	(4)
2018–2019	Almagro	25	(7)
2019–2021	Platense	23	(8)
2021	Delfín	22	(2)
2022–2023	Belgrano	41	(4)
2023–2024	Barracas Central	10	(0)
2024–2025	Atlanta	17	(2)
2025–2026	Alvarado	20	(1)
2026–	Olimpo	0	(0)
- * Club domestic league appearances and goals as of 17:01, 14 April 2026 (UTC)

Joaquín Susvielles (born 28 February 1991) is an Argentine professional footballer who plays as a forward for Club Olimpo.

== Career ==
Atlético Santa Rosa were Susvielles' first club, which preceded the forward appearing for Alvear FC during the 2011–12 Torneo Argentino B season and playing thirteen times. Fellow fourth tier outfit Villa Mitre signed Susvielles in 2012. He remained for two years, scoring twenty-eight goals in fifty fixtures. On 30 June 2014, Susvielles joined Olimpo of the Argentine Primera División. He made his debut in a 1–1 tie with Racing Club on 25 October, which was the first of five appearances for Olimpo. Primera B Nacional's Guillermo Brown loaned Susvielles in 2015. Two goals in twenty-eight matches followed.

In January 2016, Susvielles completed a move to Ferro Carril Oeste (GP). He scored his first goals for them on 27 March 2016, notching a brace during a Torneo Federal A victory away to Alvarado. He scored two further goals, including another versus Alvarado and one against Unión Aconquija, in fifteen games as Ferro Carril Oeste were knockout out the play-offs by the aforementioned Unión Aconquija. Susvielles again departed Olimpo in July 2016, signing on loan for Alvarado in Torneo Federal A. He went on to score six goals across 2016–17, before being signed permanently for 2017–18 by Alvarado.

Susvielles joined Almagro on 30 June 2018. He scored on debut in a Copa Argentina win over Cipolletti, which preceded him netting Primera B Nacional goals against Deportivo Morón, Quilmes, Platense, Santamarina, Mitre (2) and Gimnasia y Esgrima. July 2019 saw Susvielles complete a move to Platense. He netted on his first home appearance versus Estudiantes on 25 August, on the way to a total of eight goals in two seasons with the club; including their promotion winning campaign of 2020. Susvielles wouldn't feature in the Primera División as he headed abroad to join Ecuadorian Serie A side Delfín. In January 2022, Susvielles joined Primera Nacional side Belgrano to fight for the club's promotion to the Liga Profesional de Fútbol.

== Career statistics ==
As of 16 February 2022.

Club statistics
Club	Season	League			Cup		League Cup		Continental		Other		Total	
Club	Season	Division	Apps	Goals	Apps	Goals	Apps	Goals	Apps	Goals	Apps	Goals	Apps	Goals
Alvear FC	2011–12	Torneo Argentino B	13	0	0	0	—		—		0	0	13	0
Olimpo	2014	Primera División	5	0	0	0	—		—		0	0	5	0
Olimpo	2015	Primera División	0	0	0	0	—		—		0	0	0	0
Olimpo	2016	Primera División	0	0	0	0	—		—		0	0	0	0
Olimpo	2016–17	Primera División	0	0	0	0	—		—		0	0	0	0
Olimpo	Total		5	0	0	0	—		—		0	0	5	0
Guillermo Brown (loan)	2015	Primera B Nacional	27	2	0	0	—		—		1 (Note: Appearance(s) in the Primera B Nacional play-offs)	0	28	2
Ferro Carril Oeste (GP) (loan)	2016	Torneo Federal A	11	3	0	0	—		—		4 (Note: Appearance(s) in the Torneo Federal A play-offs)	1	15	4
Alvarado (loan)	2016–17	Torneo Federal A	24	5	2	0	—		—		2	1	28	6
Alvarado	2017–18	Torneo Federal A	20	4	3	1	—		—		4	1	27	6
Alvarado	Total		44	9	5	1	—		—		6	2	55	12
Almagro	2018–19	Primera Nacional	25	7	4	1	—		—		0	0	29	8
Platense	2019–20	Primera Nacional	19	6	1	0	—		—		0	0	20	6
Platense	2020	Primera Nacional	4	2	0	0	—		—		0	0	4	2
Platense	Total		23	8	1	0	—		—		0	0	24	8
Delfín	2021	Serie A	1	0	0	0	—		—		0	0	1	0
Belgrano	2022	Primera Nacional	1	1	0	0	—		—		0	0	1	1
Career total			150	30	10	2	—		—		11	3	171	35
