= Gonzalo Bazán =

Argentine footballer

Personal information
- Full name: Gonzalo Ismael Bazán
- Date of birth: 5 May 1989 (age 37)
- Place of birth: La Rioja, Argentina
- Height: 1.65 m (5 ft 5 in)
- Position: Midfielder

Youth career
- –2009: San Lorenzo

Senior career*
| Years | Team | Apps | (Gls) |
| 2009–2014 | San Lorenzo | 38 | (0) |
| 2011 | → Indep. Rivadavia (loan) | 16 | (1) |
| 2012–2013 | → Instituto (loan) | 28 | (2) |
| 2013–2014 | → Atlético Tucumán (loan) | 27 | (2) |
| 2014–2016 | Ferro Carril Oeste | 50 | (6) |
| 2016–2017 | Arsenal de Sarandí | 27 | (2) |
| 2017–2018 | Sarmiento | 23 | (5) |
| 2018–2019 | Gimnasia Mendoza | 16 | (1) |
| 2019–2020 | Platense | 16 | (0) |
| 2021 | Guillermo Brown | 21 | (1) |
| 2022 | Chacarita Juniors | 2 | (0) |
- * Club domestic league appearances and goals as of 16:07, 11 July 2022 (UTC)

Gonzalo Ismael Bazán (born 5 May 1989) is an Argentine professional footballer who plays as a midfielder.

== Career ==
San Lorenzo were Bazán's first club, he was in the youth ranks of the club before he made his first-team debut on 4 July 2009 in a 3–0 league win versus Argentinos Juniors. Eleven appearances later, in 2009–10 and 2010–11, Bazán left on loan to join Primera B Nacional team Independiente Rivadavia. He played in 16 league games and scored once for them before returning to San Lorenzo and subsequently 26 matches for his parent club during the 2011–12 Argentine Primera División season. Those were his last appearances for San Lorenzo as he was loaned out in the following two seasons to Instituto and Atlético Tucumán, both of Primera B Nacional, before leaving permanently in 2014 to Ferro Carril Oeste.

He made his Ferro Carril Oeste debut on 3 September in a Primera B Nacional loss to Gimnasia Jujuy. 6 goals in 50 matches came for Bazán at Ferro before he departed to sign for Argentine Primera División club Arsenal de Sarandí. He joined Sarmiento in July 2017.

== Career statistics ==
As of 18 November 2017.

Club statistics
| Club | Season | League | | | Cup (Note: Includes the Copa Argentina.) | | League Cup | | Continental (Note: Includes the Copa Libertadores and Copa Sudamericana) | | Other | | Total | |
| Club | Season | Division | Apps | Goals | Apps | Goals | Apps | Goals | Apps | Goals | Apps | Goals | Apps | Goals |
|---|---|---|---|---|---|---|---|---|---|---|---|---|---|---|
| San Lorenzo | 2008–09 | Primera División | 1 | 0 | 0 | 0 | — | | 0 | 0 | 0 | 0 | 1 | 0 |
| San Lorenzo | 2009–10 | Primera División | 10 | 0 | 0 | 0 | — | | 4 (Note: Four appearances in 2009 Copa Sudamericana) | 0 | 0 | 0 | 14 | 0 |
| San Lorenzo | 2010–11 | Primera División | 1 | 0 | 0 | 0 | — | | — | | 0 | 0 | 1 | 0 |
| San Lorenzo | 2011–12 | Primera División | 26 | 0 | 0 | 0 | — | | — | | 0 | 0 | 26 | 0 |
| San Lorenzo | 2012–13 | Primera División | 0 | 0 | 0 | 0 | — | | — | | 0 | 0 | 0 | 0 |
| San Lorenzo | 2013–14 | Primera División | 0 | 0 | 0 | 0 | — | | 0 | 0 | 0 | 0 | 0 | 0 |
| San Lorenzo | Total | | 38 | 0 | 0 | 0 | — | | 4 | 0 | 0 | 0 | 42 | 0 |
| Independiente Rivadavia (loan) | 2010–11 | Primera B Nacional | 16 | 1 | 0 | 0 | — | | — | | 0 | 0 | 16 | 1 |
| Instituto (loan) | 2012–13 | Primera B Nacional | 28 | 2 | 2 | 1 | — | | — | | 0 | 0 | 30 | 3 |
| Atlético Tucumán (loan) | 2013–14 | Primera B Nacional | 27 | 2 | 0 | 0 | — | | — | | 0 | 0 | 27 | 2 |
| Ferro Carril Oeste | 2014 | Primera B Nacional | 11 | 2 | 1 | 0 | — | | — | | 0 | 0 | 12 | 2 |
| Ferro Carril Oeste | 2015 | Primera B Nacional | 39 | 4 | 3 | 0 | — | | — | | 0 | 0 | 42 | 4 |
| Ferro Carril Oeste | Total | | 50 | 6 | 4 | 0 | — | | — | | 0 | 0 | 54 | 6 |
| Arsenal de Sarandí | 2016 | Primera División | 15 | 2 | 0 | 0 | — | | — | | 0 | 0 | 15 | 2 |
| Arsenal de Sarandí | 2016–17 | Primera División | 12 | 0 | 3 | 0 | — | | 1 (Note: One appearance in 2017 Copa Sudamericana) | 0 | 0 | 0 | 16 | 0 |
| Arsenal de Sarandí | Total | | 27 | 2 | 3 | 0 | — | | 1 | 0 | 0 | 0 | 31 | 0 |
| Sarmiento | 2017–18 | Primera B Nacional | 5 | 1 | 2 | 0 | — | | — | | 0 | 0 | 7 | 1 |
| Sarmiento | Total | | 5 | 1 | 2 | 0 | — | | — | | 0 | 0 | 7 | 1 |
| Career total | | | 191 | 14 | 11 | 1 | — | | 5 | 0 | 0 | 0 | 207 | 15 |
