= Franco Baldassarra =

Argentine footballer

Personal information
- Full name: Franco Pedro Augusto Baldassarra
- Date of birth: 29 September 1998 (age 28)
- Place of birth: Santos Lugares, Argentina
- Height: 1.78 m (5 ft 10 in)
- Position: Midfielder

Team information
- Current team: Kauno Žalgiris
- Number: 32

Youth career
- Argentinos Juniors
- 2014–2019: Platense

Senior career*
Years	Team	Apps	(Gls)
2019–	Platense	121	(6)
2023–2024	→ Panetolikos (loan)	15	(1)
2026–	Kauno Žalgiris	20	(1)
- * Club domestic league appearances and goals as of 7 September 2026 (UTC)

Franco Pedro Augusto Baldassarra (born 29 September 1998) is an Argentine professional footballer who plays as a midfielder for Toplyga club Kauno Žalgiris.

== Career ==
Baldassarra joined Platense from Argentinos Juniors in 2014. He made the breakthrough into Platense's first-team in April 2019, as he made the bench for a Primera B Nacional match with Temperley. His senior debut arrived in that match, with Fernando Ruiz selecting him to replace Marcelo Vega with twenty minutes left of an away draw; it was his only 2018–19 appearance. Baldassarra's first match of 2019–20 saw him make his first start in a win over Barracas Central on 29 October 2019. Baldassarra netted his first senior goal on 27 January 2021 versus Atlético de Rafaela in the semi-finals of the play-offs, which Platense went on to win.

Baldassarra made his Primera División debut on 21 February away against ex-club Argentinos Juniors.

On 26 February 2026, Lithuanian club Kauno Žalgiris announced the signing of Baldassarra.

== Career statistics ==
As of 4 May 2025

Appearances and goals by club, season and competition
Club	Season	League			National cup		Continental		Total	
Club	Season	Division	Apps	Goals	Apps	Goals	Apps	Goals	Apps	Goals
Platense	2018-19	Primera Nacional	1	0	0	0	—		1	0
Platense	2019-20	Primera Nacional	12	0	1	0	—		13	0
Platense	2020-21	Primera Nacional	4	0	0	0	—		4	0
Platense	2021	Primera División	22	0	10	2	0	0	32	2
Platense	2022	Primera División	9	0	10	0	0	0	19	0
Platense	2023	Primera División	22	2	1	0	0	0	23	2
Platense	2025	Primera División	4	0	0	0	0	0	4	0
Platense	Total		74	2	22	2	0	0	96	4
Panetolikos	2023-24	Super League	28	1	2	0	—		30	1
Career total			102	3	24	2	0	0	126	5

== Honours ==
Platense

- Argentine Primera División: 2025 Apertura

Kauno Žalgiris

- Toplyga: 2026
- Lithuanian Cup: 2026
