= Emanuel Carreira =

Argentine professional footballer

Personal information
- Full name: Emanuel Mateo Carreira
- Date of birth: 21 May 1987 (age 39)
- Place of birth: Lomas de Zamora, Argentina
- Height: 1.77 m (5 ft 10 in)
- Position: Midfielder

Senior career*
Years	Team	Apps	(Gls)
2006–2012	Temperley	122	(4)
2012–2014	Tristán Suárez	38	(2)
2015–2016	Colegiales	36	(1)
2016–2019	Platense	33	(0)
2020–2021	Colegiales	11	(0)
- * Club domestic league appearances and goals as of 13:10, 11 July 2020 (UTC)

Emanuel Mateo Carreira (born 21 May 1987) is an Argentine professional footballer who plays as a midfielder.

== Career ==
Carreira's career began with Temperley. After debuting professionally in 2006, the midfielder went on to feature one hundred and twenty-two times for the club across six seasons; whilst also netting four goals, the first of which came against Atlanta on 7 April 2009. In June 2013, Carreira switched Temperley for fellow third tier outfit Tristán Suárez. His first appearance arrived in a victory over Brown on 11 September, while his first goals came in his final two games of 2012–13 versus Acassuso and Los Andes. On 14 January 2015, Carreira signed for Colegiales. One goal in thirty-six fixtures followed across two campaigns with the team.

Carreira completed a move to Platense of Primera B Metropolitana in 2016. In his second year, 2017–18, they won promotion as champions to Primera B Nacional; he had participated thirty-four times for them. In January 2020, having not played for Platense since March 2018, Carreira rejoined Colegiales.

== Career statistics ==
As of 11 July 2020.

Appearances and goals by club, season and competition
Club	Season	League			Cup		League Cup		Continental		Other		Total	
Club	Season	Division	Apps	Goals	Apps	Goals	Apps	Goals	Apps	Goals	Apps	Goals	Apps	Goals
Tristán Suárez	2012–13	Primera B Metropolitana	25	2	0	0	—		—		0	0	25	2
Tristán Suárez	2013–14	Primera B Metropolitana	13	0	0	0	—		—		0	0	13	0
Tristán Suárez	2014	Primera B Metropolitana	0	0	0	0	—		—		0	0	0	0
Tristán Suárez	Total		38	2	0	0	—		—		0	0	38	2
Colegiales	2015	Primera B Metropolitana	23	0	0	0	—		—		0	0	23	0
Colegiales	2016	Primera B Metropolitana	13	1	0	0	—		—		0	0	13	1
Colegiales	Total		36	1	0	0	—		—		0	0	36	1
Platense	2016–17	Primera B Metropolitana	27	0	0	0	—		—		1 (Note: Appearance(s) in the Primera B Metropolitana play-offs)	0	28	0
Platense	2017–18	Primera B Metropolitana	6	0	0	0	—		—		0	0	6	0
Platense	2018–19	Primera B Nacional	0	0	0	0	—		—		0	0	0	0
Platense	2019–20	Primera B Nacional	0	0	0	0	—		—		0	0	0	0
Platense	Total		33	0	0	0	—		—		1	0	34	0
Colegiales	2019–20	Primera B Metropolitana	8	0	0	0	—		—		0	0	8	0
Career total			115	3	0	0	—		—		1	0	116	3

== Honours ==
Platense

- Primera B Metropolitana: 2017–18
