= Cristian Zarco =

Argentine footballer

Personal information
- Full name: Cristian Osvaldo Zarco
- Date of birth: 20 April 1996 (age 30)
- Place of birth: Argentina
- Position: Forward

Senior career*
Years	Team	Apps	(Gls)
2014–2019	Platense	29	(1)
- * Club domestic league appearances and goals

Cristian Osvaldo Zarco (born 20 April 1996) is an Argentine professional footballer who plays as a forward.

== Career ==
Zarco began his career in Platense's ranks. He made his professional bow for the Primera B Metropolitana club on 10 May 2014 against Colegiales, coming off the substitutes bench in place of Jonathan Páez as the fixture ended 2–2. His first start arrived on 25 May versus Deportivo Armenio, with Platense finishing the 2013–14 campaign fourth; eventually losing in the play-off final to Temperley. Platense did, however, win promotion four years later in 2017–18, a season Zarco scored his first senior goal during a victory away to Almirante Brown in September 2017; in what was his twenty-sixth appearance for the club. He departed Quilmes in June 2019.

== Career statistics ==
As of 7 July 2020.

Appearances and goals by club, season and competition
Club	Season	League			Cup		Continental		Other		Total	
Club	Season	Division	Apps	Goals	Apps	Goals	Apps	Goals	Apps	Goals	Apps	Goals
Platense	2013–14	Primera B Metropolitana	2	0	0	0	—		0	0	2	0
Platense	2014	Primera B Metropolitana	3	0	0	0	—		0	0	3	0
Platense	2015	Primera B Metropolitana	8	0	0	0	—		0	0	8	0
Platense	2016	Primera B Metropolitana	0	0	0	0	—		0	0	0	0
Platense	2016–17	Primera B Metropolitana	7	0	0	0	—		1 (Note: Appearance(s) in the Primera B Nacional play-offs)	0	8	0
Platense	2017–18	Primera B Metropolitana	9	1	0	0	—		0	0	9	1
Platense	2018–19	Primera B Nacional	0	0	0	0	—		0	0	0	0
Career total			29	1	0	0	—		1	0	30	1

== Honours ==
Platense

- Primera B Metropolitana: 2017–18
