= Nahuel Iribarren =

Argentine footballer

Personal information
- Full name: Nahuel Nicolás Iribarren
- Date of birth: 2 February 1988 (age 38)
- Place of birth: Posadas, Argentina
- Height: 1.87 m (6 ft 2 in)
- Position: Centre-back

Team information
- Current team: Almirante Brown

Youth career
- San Lorenzo

Senior career*
Years	Team	Apps	(Gls)
2010	San Lorenzo	3	(0)
2010	→ Ferro Carril Oeste (loan)	0	(0)
2011–2012	Almagro	5	(0)
2012–2013	Rosamonte	18	(1)
2013–2014	Sarmiento	11	(0)
2014–2015	Colegiales	37	(3)
2016–2017	Estudiantes BA	44	(1)
2017–2018	Fernando Cáceres		
2018–2021	Platense	54	(1)
2022	Blooming	22	(0)
2023	Almirante Brown	10	(0)
2023–2024	Deportivo Riestra	23	(1)
2024	Universidad Central	5	(0)
2025–	Almirante Brown	7	(0)
- * Club domestic league appearances and goals as of 18:03, 29 June 2025 (UTC)

Nahuel Nicolás Iribarren (born 2 February 1988) is an Argentine professional footballer who plays as a centre-back for Almirante Brown.

== Career ==
San Lorenzo were Iribarren's first club. Diego Simeone oversaw the defender's breakthrough into senior football in 2009–10, as Iribarren made three appearances across fixtures against Rosario Central, Arsenal de Sarandí and Gimnasia y Esgrima. Ahead of the 2010–11 campaign, Iribarren completed a loan move to Ferro Carril Oeste. He returned to his parent team months later after no competitive matches in Primera B Nacional. In January 2011, Iribarren switched to Almagro. Further stints with Rosamonte and Sarmiento in Torneo Argentino B followed - bringing twenty-nine games and one goal in the fourth tier.

On 30 June 2014, Iribarren joined Primera B Metropolitana side Colegiales. He remained for two seasons, making thirty-seven appearances and netting three goals; as well as receiving two red cards within a month of each other during the 2015 season. Iribarren then moved across the division to play for Estudiantes. After one goal in forty-seven encounters for Estudinates, Iribarren signed with regional league outfit Fernando Cáceres. In January 2018, Platense signed Iribarren. His first campaign ended with promotion as champions, as they beat his former club Estudiantes in a promotion play-off to collect the title.

In January 2022, Iribarren joined Bolivian Primera División side Club Blooming.

== Career statistics ==
As of 8 March 2019.

Appearances and goals by club, season and competition
Club	Season	League			Cup		Continental		Other		Total	
Club	Season	Division	Apps	Goals	Apps	Goals	Apps	Goals	Apps	Goals	Apps	Goals
San Lorenzo	2009–10	Primera División	3	0	0	0	—		0	0	3	0
San Lorenzo	2010–11	Primera División	0	0	0	0	—		0	0	0	0
San Lorenzo	Total		3	0	0	0	—		0	0	3	0
Ferro Carril Oeste (loan)	2010–11	Primera B Nacional	0	0	0	0	—		0	0	0	0
Rosamonte	2012–13	Torneo Argentino B	18	1	0	0	—		0	0	18	1
Sarmiento	2013–14	Torneo Argentino B	11	0	0	0	—		0	0	11	0
Colegiales	2014	Primera B Metropolitana	15	0	1	0	—		0	0	16	0
Colegiales	2015	Primera B Metropolitana	22	3	0	0	—		0	0	22	3
Colegiales	Total		37	3	1	0	—		0	0	38	3
Estudiantes	2016	Primera B Metropolitana	17	0	0	0	—		0	0	17	0
Estudiantes	2016–17	Primera B Metropolitana	27	1	2	0	—		3 (Note: Appearance(s) in the Primera B Metropolitana play-offs)	0	32	1
Estudiantes	Total		44	1	2	0	—		3	0	49	1
Platense	2017–18	Primera B Metropolitana	12	0	1	0	—		1	0	14	0
Platense	2018–19	Primera B Nacional	9	0	2	1	—		0	0	11	1
Platense	Total		21	0	3	1	—		1	0	25	1
Career total			134	5	6	1	—		4	0	144	6

== Honours ==
Platense

- Primera B Metropolitana: 2017–18
