= Álex Portillo =

Spanish footballer

Personal information
- Full name: Alejandro Fernández Portillo
- Date of birth: 6 November 1992 (age 34)
- Place of birth: Málaga, Spain
- Height: 1.82 m (6 ft 0 in)
- Position: Centre back

Team information
- Current team: Torre del Mar

Youth career
- Málaga

Senior career*
| Years | Team | Apps | (Gls) |
| 2011 | Atlético Malagueño | 2 | (0) |
| 2011–2012 | Unión Estepona | 35 | (4) |
| 2012–2015 | Atlético Malagueño | 99 | (7) |
| 2015–2016 | Marbella | 6 | (0) |
| 2016–2017 | Jönköpings Södra | 26 | (0) |
| 2018 | Antequera | 3 | (0) |
| 2019 | IF Elfsborg | 9 | (1) |
| 2020–2021 | Antequera | 24 | (1) |
| 2021–2024 | Vélez | 75 | (3) |
| 2024– | Torre del Mar | 17 | (1) |
- * Club domestic league appearances and goals as of 13 October 2024

Alejandro Fernández Portillo (born 6 November 1992) is a Spanish footballer who plays for Torre del Mar.
