= Vélez CF =

Association football club in Spain

- Full name: Vélez Club de Fútbol
- Nicknames: Veleños, Veleñistas
- Founded: 22 September 1922; 104 years ago
- Ground: Vivar Téllez, Vélez-Málaga, Andalusia, Spain
- Capacity: 2,100
- Chairman: Jesper Norberg
- Manager: Michael Jolley
- 2024–25: División de Honor – Group 2, retired (relegated)
Home colours	Away colours

Vélez Club de Fútbol is a Spanish football team based in Vélez-Málaga, in the autonomous community of Andalusia. Founded on 22 September 1922 it holds home matches at Estadio Vivar Téllez, with a capacity of 2,100 seats.

== History ==
The club was founded in 1922 and officially registered in the South Regional Federation in 1940, spending its first years in provincial tournaments.

On 17 June 2019 Vélez appointed Francis Parrado as a head coach for the 2019–20 season in Tercera División.

=== Club background ===
- Sociedad Deportiva Vélez Fútbol Club (1922–1936)
- Vélez Fútbol Club (1940–1958)
- Club Deportivo Veleño Educación y Descanso (1958–1968)
- Club Deportivo Veleño (1968–1976)
- Vélez Club de Fútbol (1976–)

== First-team squad ==
Updated 21 August 2022. Players listed on the First Team page on Vélez CF's club profile. Note: Flags indicate national team as defined under FIFA eligibility rules; some limited exceptions apply. Players may hold more than one non-FIFA nationality.

No.	Pos.	Nation	Player
1	GK	ESP	Miguel Guerrero
3	DF	ESP	Álvaro Ocaña
4	DF	ESP	Álex Portillo
6	DF	ESP	Adolfo Romero
8	MF	CGO	Kaya Makosso
10	FW	ARG	Damián Zamorano
13	GK	ESP	Diego Barrios
14	DF	ARG	Emanuel Bocchino
15	MF	POR	Mauro Andrade
16	DF	MAR	Essel
17	MF	URU	Gonzalo Miranda

No.	Pos.	Nation	Player
18	FW	PAR	Richard Gaona
19	FW	ESP	Joselinho
22	FW	ESP	Baltasar Moreno
-	GK	SWE	Mio Didi
-	DF	ESP	Héctor Martínez
-	DF	ESP	Raúl Espinosa
-	MF	ESP	Yael Ballesteros
-	MF	ESP	Jorge Barba
-	MF	ESP	Quique Escolano
-	FW	ESP	Luismi Gutiérrez
-	FW	ESP	Gastón Valles

== Season to season ==
Season	Tier	Division	Place	Copa del Rey
1928–29	3	3ª Prov.		
1929–30	6	3ª Prov.		
1930–31	6	3ª Prov.		
1931–32	6	3ª Prov.		
1932–33	6	3ª Prov.		
1933–34	6	3ª Prov.		
1934–35	6	3ª Prov.		
1935–36	6	3ª Prov.		
1940–41	6	3ª Prov.		
1941–42	4	2ª Prov.		
1942–43	4	2ª Prov.		
1943–44	5	2ª Prov.		
1944–45	5	2ª Prov.		
1945–46	5	2ª Prov.	1st	
1946–47	5	2ª Prov.	3rd	
1947–48	5	2ª Prov.	4th	
1948–49	5	2ª Prov.		
1949–50	5	2ª Prov.		
1950–51	5	2ª Prov.		
1951–52	4	1ª Prov.	4th	

Season	Tier	Division	Place	Copa del Rey
1952–53	5	1ª Prov.	1st	
1953–54	4	1ª Prov.	15th	
1954–55	5	2ª Prov.	5th	
1955–56	5	2ª Prov.	4th	
1956–57	5	2ª Prov.	3rd	
1957–58	5	2ª Prov.	7th	
1958–59	5	2ª Prov.	5th	
1959–60	4	1ª Prov.	1st	
1960–61	3	3ª	10th	
1961–62	3	3ª	8th	
1962–63	3	3ª	13th	
1963–64	3	3ª	16th	
1964–65	4	1ª Reg.	1st	
1965–66	4	1ª Reg.	11th	
1966–67	4	1ª Reg.	3rd	
1967–68	4	1ª Reg.	11th	
1968–69	4	Reg. Pref.	3rd	
1969–70	4	Reg. Pref.	8th	
1970–71	4	Reg. Pref.	7th	
1971–72	4	Reg. Pref.	7th	

Season	Tier	Division	Place	Copa del Rey
1972–73	4	Reg. Pref.	16th	
1973–74	4	Reg. Pref.	3rd	
1974–75	4	Reg. Pref.	2nd	
1975–76	4	Reg. Pref.	9th	
1976–77	4	Reg. Pref.	7th	
1977–78	4	3ª	15th	First round
1978–79	4	3ª	10th	
1979–80	4	3ª	12th	First round
1980–81	4	3ª	13th	
1981–82	4	3ª	13th	
1982–83	4	3ª	20th	
1983–84	5	Reg. Pref.	6th	
1984–85	5	Reg. Pref.	5th	
1985–86	5	Reg. Pref.	9th	
1986–87	5	Reg. Pref.	2nd	
1987–88	4	3ª	22nd	
1988–89	5	Reg. Pref.	2nd	
1989–90	4	3ª	13th	
1990–91	4	3ª	12th	
1991–92	4	3ª	1st	

Season	Tier	Division	Place	Copa del Rey
1992–93	4	3ª	13th	Second round
1993–94	4	3ª	2nd	
1994–95	4	3ª	4th	
1995–96	3	2ª B	14th	Second round
1996–97	3	2ª B	18th	
1997–98	4	3ª	4th	
1998–99	4	3ª	14th	
1999–2000	4	3ª	17th	
2000–01	4	3ª	12th	
2001–02	4	3ª	14th	
2002–03	4	3ª	18th	
2003–04	5	Reg. Pref.	6th	
2004–05	5	1ª And.	11th	
2005–06	5	1ª And.	1st	
2006–07	4	3ª	7th	
2007–08	4	3ª	4th	
2008–09	4	3ª	8th	
2009–10	4	3ª	10th	
2010–11	4	3ª	15th	
2011–12	4	3ª	17th	

Season	Tier	Division	Place	Copa del Rey
2012–13	4	3ª	8th	
2013–14	4	3ª	6th	
2014–15	4	3ª	11th	
2015–16	4	3ª	8th	
2016–17	4	3ª	15th	
2017–18	4	3ª	12th	
2018–19	4	3ª	5th	
2019–20	4	3ª	16th	
2020–21	4	3ª	1st / 1st	
2021–22	4	2ª RFEF	11th	
2022–23	4	2ª Fed.	13th	
2023–24	4	2ª Fed.	17th	
2024–25	6	Div. Hon.	(R)	

- 2 seasons in Segunda División B
- 3 season in Segunda Federación/Segunda División RFEF
- 38 seasons in Tercera División

== Famous players ==
- (Spain) Fernando Hierro (Youth Academy)
- (Spain) Angelo
- (Spain) Alfonso Vera
- (Denmark) Thomas Gant
