= Jorge De Olivera =

Argentine football goalkeeper

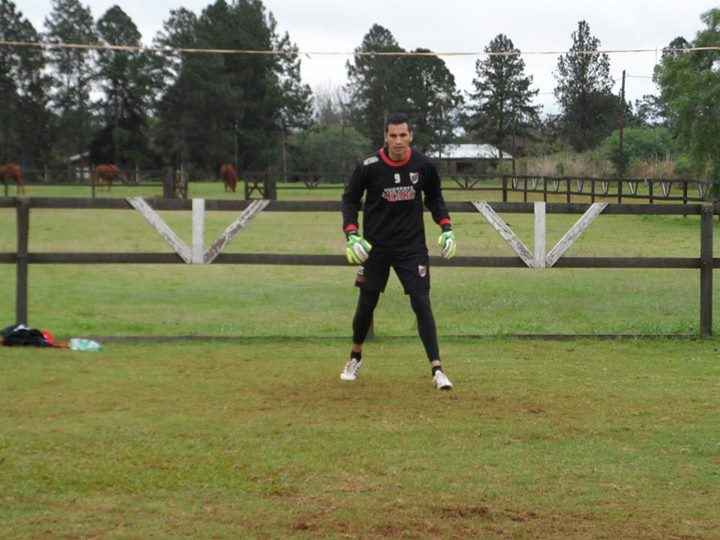

Personal information
- Full name: Jorge Alberto De Olivera
- Date of birth: August 21, 1982 (age 44)
- Place of birth: Posadas, Argentina
- Height: 1.94 m (6 ft 4 in)
- Position: Goalkeeper

Youth career
- Nueva Chicago

Senior career*
Years	Team	Apps	(Gls)
2003–2004	Nueva Chicago	27	(1)
2004–2006	Colón	6	(0)
2006	Olimpo	0	(0)
2007	Aldosivi	18	(0)
2007–2009	Nueva Chicago	30	(0)
2009–2013	Racing Club	63	(0)
2014	Rubio Ñu	19	(0)
2014–2015	Guaraní Antonio Franco	19	(0)
2015–2016	Cobreloa	32	(0)
2016–2017	Deportivo Pasto	13	(0)
2017–2022	Platense	128	(1)
2022	Independiente Rivadavia	21	(0)
Total		376	(2)
- * Club domestic league appearances and goals

Jorge Alberto De Olivera (born 21 August 1982 in Posadas) is an Argentine former professional footballer who played as a goalkeeper.

== Career ==
De Olivera began his playing career in 2002 with Nueva Chicago in the Primera División. He made his league debut on 5 July 2003 in a 0–3 home defeat to Banfield. After Nueva Chicago were relegated in 2004 De Olivera joined Colón de Santa Fe where he became the second choice goalkeeper after Laureano Tombolini. After only 6 appearances in 2 seasons he had short stints with Olimpo de Bahía Blanca and Aldosivi of the 2nd division.

In 2007, he returned to Nueva Chicago, but was unable to help prevent the club from suffering their second consecutive relegation to the regionalised 3rd division. He remained with the club for another season but after they failed to win promotion back to the 2nd tier he joined Primera División side Racing Club in 2009.
