= Juan Infante =

Argentine footballer

Personal information
- Full name: Juan José Infante
- Date of birth: 7 January 1996 (age 30)
- Place of birth: José C. Paz, Argentina
- Height: 1.75 m (5 ft 9 in)
- Position: Left-back

Team information
- Current team: Atlético Tucumán
- Number: 32

Youth career
- Platense

Senior career*
Years	Team	Apps	(Gls)
2014–2024	Platense	208	(2)
2016–2017	→ Talleres (loan)	0	(0)
2024–	Atlético Tucumán	51	(1)
- * Club domestic league appearances and goals as of 17:41, 9 November 2026 (UTC)

Juan José Infante (born 7 January 1996) is an Argentine professional footballer who plays as a left-back for Atlético Tucumán.

== Career ==
Platense gave Infante his start in senior football. Mariano Rukaviña selected Infante for his debut on 8 September 2014 during a win away from home against Deportivo Morón, prior to picking him to start again on 19 September versus Comunicaciones. Infante featured forty-four times for Platense in his opening three campaigns. In August 2016, Infante was loaned to Primera División side Talleres. He remained for 2016–17, though failed to make a first-team appearance; only appearing for their academy. He returned to Platense in 2017–18, subsequently netting his first goal in a draw with Comunicaciones; in which he was also sent off.

== Career statistics ==
As of 8 March 2019.

Appearances and goals by club, season and competition
Club	Season	League			Cup		Continental		Other		Total	
Club	Season	Division	Apps	Goals	Apps	Goals	Apps	Goals	Apps	Goals	Apps	Goals
Platense	2014	Primera B Metropolitana	2	0	0	0	—		0	0	2	0
Platense	2015	Primera B Metropolitana	27	0	0	0	—		1 (Note: Appearance(s) in the Primera B Metropolitana play-offs)	0	28	0
Platense	2016	Primera B Metropolitana	14	0	0	0	—		0	0	14	0
Platense	2016–17	Primera B Metropolitana	0	0	0	0	—		0	0	0	0
Platense	2017–18	Primera B Metropolitana	30	1	1	0	—		1	0	32	1
Platense	2018–19	Primera B Nacional	16	0	2	0	—		0	0	18	0
Platense	Total		89	1	3	0	—		2	0	94	1
Talleres (loan)	2016–17	Primera División	0	0	0	0	—		0	0	0	0
Career total			89	1	3	0	—		2	0	94	1

== Honours ==
Platense

- Primera B Metropolitana: 2017–18
