= Fredo =

Fredo is a masculine given name, and diminutive of Alfredo or Federico, which may refer to:

== People ==
- Getúlio Fredo (born 1954), Brazilian football manager
- Fredo Santana (1990–2018), stage name of American rapper Derrick Coleman (born 1990)
- Fredo Viola (fl. 2004–present), American singer-songwriter and multi-media artist
- Fredo (rapper) (born 1994), London-based rapper

== Fictional characters ==
- Fredo Corleone, in the Godfather films and novels
- Fredo Legaspi, a main character in the Filipino TV series Dyesebel (2008 TV series)
- Alfredo "Fredo" Montilla, a protagonist in the Filipino TV series Dyesebel (2014 TV series)
- Fredo, the title character of Fantastic Man, a 2007 Filipino TV series
- Fredo Gupta, a character in Harvey Girls Forever!

== See also ==
- Frei Municipality, a former municipality in Norway whose name was written Fredø until 1889
- Frei (island), an island in Norway whose name was written Fredø until 1889
- Freddo, a chocolate bar shaped like a frog
