= Alfredo Valente (photographer) =

Italian-born American photographer

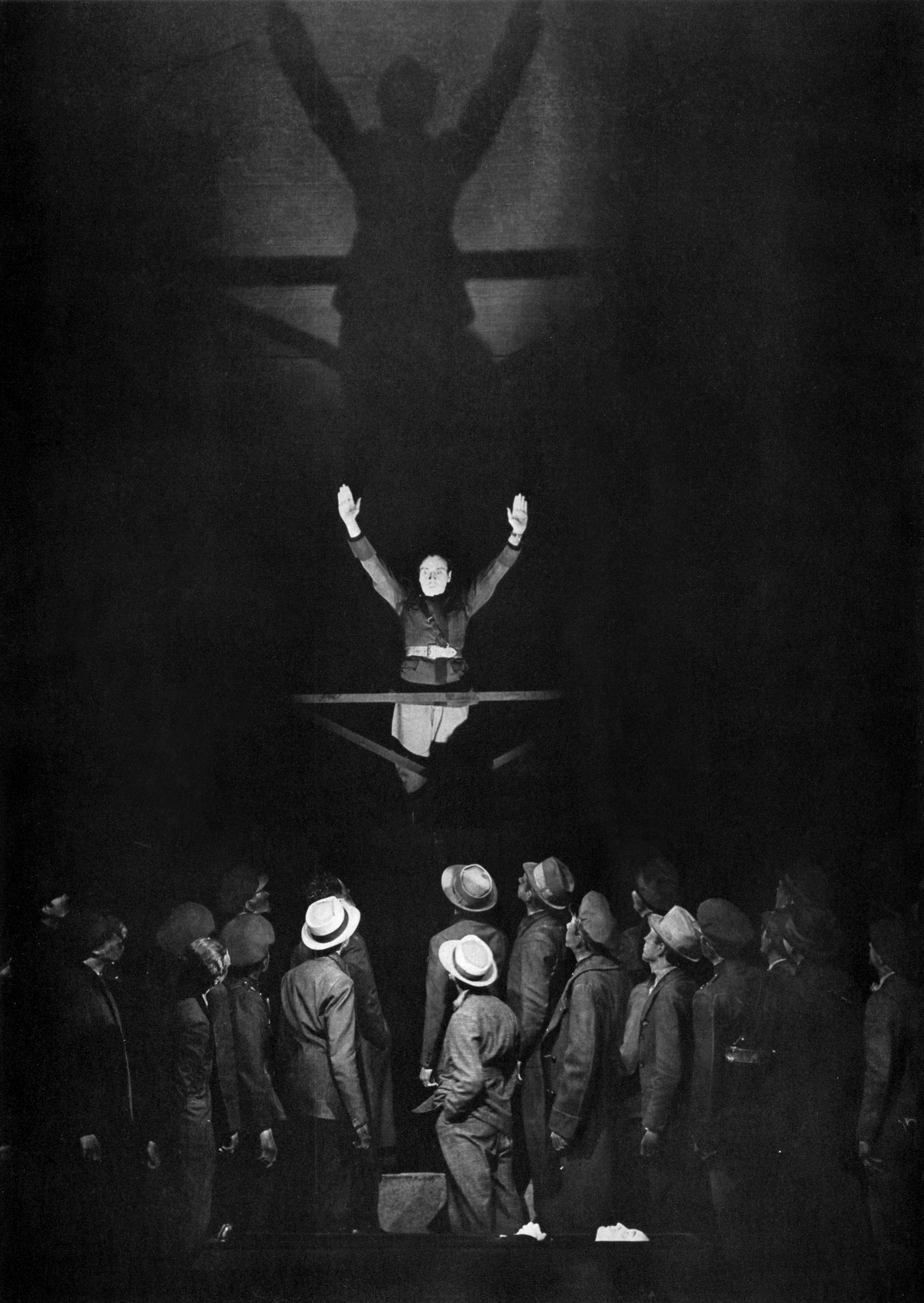
Alfredo Valente's signature use of artistic camera angles and dramatic lighting appears in his photograph of the Mercury Theatre's inaugural production, Caesar (1937).

Alfredo G. Valente (March 17, 1899 – June 27, 1973) was an Italian-born American photographer known for his prolific career chronicling Broadway theatre. He is also credited as a singer, painter, art collector, dealer and cultural administrator.

== Biography ==
Valente was born in Calabria, Italy, where he trained as a fine artist and opera singer. In 1924, he immigrated to the United States where he performed opera in public. However, his singing career did not take off and he pivoted to focus on his photography.

In 1931, he became the photographer for the newly formed Group Theatre, an experimental theatre company based in New York City. By the mid-1930s, Valente was regularly published by magazines and newspapers, most notably Stage, a magazine dedicated to Broadway theatre. Valente was lauded as one of the leading theatre photographers of the day and his use of artistic camera angles and dramatic lighting became his signature. He also became known for portraying actors and dancers in costume, but not while performing. In addition to Broadway, Valente photographed American Ballet Theatre (then known as Ballet Theatre) during the company's formative years during the 1940s. He photographed some of Ballet Theatre's most prominent dancers, such as Harold Lang, John Kriza, Alicia Alonso, Nora Kaye, Vera Zorina, Igor Yousketvitch, Alicia Markova, Maria Tallchief, André Eglevsky, and Hugh Laing. Valente also extensively photographed the Ballet Russe de Monte-Carlo when choreographer Léonide Massine created his most famous works.

From 1935 to 1937 Valente worked under contract for Columbia Pictures, shooting publicity images. By 1937 he had become the photographer of choice at The New York Times.

Valente was also an avid collector of American art which he bought with the profits from sale of his photography. He developed close friendships with modern painters whom he considered the best of their day including Raphael Soyer, John Sloan, Thomas Hart Benton, Reginald Marsh, and Abraham Walkowitz. In 1943, he independently produced the short film "Art Discovers America" to patriotically celebrate these American artists and their contributions to the art world at large. The film was distributed by MGM and later turned into a longer form educational film titled "Grandpa Called It Art" (1944). According to his obituary, he coined the term "American Masters".

Valente died in 1973 at his home on Long Island at age 74.

== Legacy ==
Valente's archival papers and photographs are held in several repositories in the United States including the New York Public Library for the Performing Arts, the Archives of American Art and The Museum of Modern Art.
