= Alfredo Junqueira Dala =

Angolan politician

Alfredo Junqueira Dala is an Angolan politician for MPLA and a member of the National Assembly of Angola.
