= Alfredo Cachia Zammit =

Maltese politician (1890–1960)

Alfredo Cachia Zammit was a Maltese politician. He was elected to the Parliament of Malta. He was a philanthropist and land-owner, and a minor figure in Maltese politics; within the Nationalist Party, he was a follower of the moderate Ignazio Panzavecchia.
