= Laureano Tombolini =

Argentine footballer

Personal information
- Full name: Laureano Martín Tombolini
- Date of birth: August 13, 1976 (age 50)
- Place of birth: Santa Isabel, Santa Fe, Argentina
- Height: 1.87 m (6 ft 2 in)
- Position: Goalkeeper

Youth career
- Rosario Central

Senior career*
Years	Team	Apps	(Gls)
1998–2002	Rosario Central	70	(0)
2002–2008	Colón	177	(0)
2008–2009	Instituto	36	(0)
2009–2012	Olimpo	90	(0)
2012–2013	Sol de América Formosa	20	(0)
2013–2015	Juventud Unida	36	(0)
2015–2016	Mitre	43	(0)
2016–2018	Juventud Unida	52	(0)
2018–2021	Juventud Santa Isabel		
- * Club domestic league appearances and goals

Laureano Martín Tombolini (born 13 August 1976 in Santa Isabel, Santa Fe) is a retired Argentine football goalkeeper.

== Career ==
Tombolini started his professional career with Rosario Central in 1998. he made his league debut in a 1–1 away draw against independiente on 18 October 1998. In 2002, he joined Colón de Santa Fe where he has played over 170 games for the club. He captained the club on many occasions and was generally recognised as the club's first choice goalkeeper.

In 2008, he was released by Colón. He then joined Instituto of the Argentine 2nd division. After a year playing in Córdoba, Tombolini signed with Olimpo, also of the 2nd division.
