= Alfredo Álvarez Calderón =

Peruvian diver

Personal information
- Born: 19 December 1918; Lima, Peru
- Died: 25 February 2001 (aged 82); Lima, Peru

Sport
- Sport: Diving

Alfredo Álvarez Calderón (19 December 1918 – 25 February 2001) was a Peruvian diver. He competed in the men's 3 metre springboard event at the 1936 Summer Olympics.
