= Javier Rossi =

Argentine footballer

Personal information
- Full name: Javier Nicolás Rossi
- Date of birth: 4 November 1982 (age 44)
- Place of birth: La Plata, Argentina
- Height: 1.70 m (5 ft 7 in)
- Position: Forward

Team information
- Current team: Atlético Lugano

Youth career
- Newell's Old Boys

Senior career*
Years	Team	Apps	(Gls)
2003–2007	Cambaceres	152	(45)
2007–2008	Almagro	31	(12)
2008–2012	Tiro Federal	97	(35)
2011–2012	→ Huachipato (loan)	23	(5)
2012	Defensa y Justicia	6	(0)
2013	Nueva Chicago	10	(0)
2013–2014	Independiente Rivadavia	17	(2)
2014–2015	Villa Dálmine	35	(10)
2015–2017	Barracas Central	15	(4)
2016–2017	→ Deportivo Morón (loan)	46	(18)
2017–2018	Deportivo Morón	19	(10)
2018–2019	Central Córdoba SdE	28	(10)
2019–2020	Platense	19	(3)
2020–2021	Deportivo Riestra	7	(0)
2021	Acassuso	25	(9)
2021–2022	Atlético Carcarañá	6	(2)
2022	Gimnasia y Tiro	2	(0)
2022–2023	Deportivo Laferrere	37	(13)
2023	Sportivo Italiano	21	(5)
2024–	Atlético Lugano	11	(2)
- * Club domestic league appearances and goals as of 23 August 2024

Javier Nicolás Rossi (born 4 November 1982, in La Plata) is an Argentine football forward currently playing for Atlético Lugano.

== Club career ==
Rossi started his career in 2003 playing for Defensores de Cambaceres in the Primera B Metropolitana. His high scoring effectivity awoke the interest of Almagro, which signed him in 2007. A year later Rossi and his goals went to join Tiro Federal. In 2011, Rossi was loaned out to Chilean Primera División club Huachipato.

On 18 July 2019 Club Atlético Platense announced, that they had signed Rossi.

In 2024, Rossi joined Atlético Lugano in the Primera C Metropolitana.
