= Elías Borrego =

Argentine footballer

Personal information
- Full name: Elías Josué Borrego
- Date of birth: 19 July 1990 (age 36)
- Place of birth: Buenos Aires, Argentina
- Height: 1.81 m (5 ft 11 in)
- Position: Midfielder

Team information
- Current team: Deportes Limache
- Number: 10

Senior career*
Years	Team	Apps	(Gls)
2009–2013	Colegiales		
2013–2014	San Luis	40	(7)
2014–2015	Douglas Haig	41	(6)
2015–2016	Olimpo	18	(0)
2016–2017	Ferro Carril Oeste	22	(1)
2017–2018	Atlético Venezuela	33	(3)
2018–2020	Platense	36	(3)
2019–2021	Defensores de Belgrano	41	(3)
2022–	Deportes Limache	5	(0)
- * Club domestic league appearances and goals as of 16 May 2022

Elías Josué Borrego (born 19 July 1990) is an Argentine professional footballer who plays as a midfielder for Chilean Segunda División club Deportes Limache. He previously played for Colegiales in Argentina (2009–2013).
