= Emanuel Bocchino =

Argentine footballer (born 1988)

Personal information
- Full name: Emanuel Raúl Bocchino
- Date of birth: 9 March 1988 (age 38)
- Place of birth: Bigand, Argentina
- Height: 1.87 m (6 ft 2 in)
- Position: Centre-back

Team information
- Current team: Vélez
- Number: 14

Senior career*
| Years | Team | Apps | (Gls) |
| 2008–2009 | Independiente | 1 | (0) |
| 2009 | Quilmes | 0 | (0) |
| 2010–2011 | Huracán | 19 | (1) |
| 2011–2012 | Racing de Olavarría | 25 | (1) |
| 2012–2013 | Alvarado | 12 | (0) |
| 2013–2015 | Central Córdoba | 71 | (1) |
| 2016 | Brown | 10 | (0) |
| 2016–2017 | Blooming | 40 | (3) |
| 2017–2019 | Platense | 33 | (1) |
| 2019–2020 | Alki Oroklini | 15 | (0) |
| 2020– | Vélez | 39 | (2) |
- * Club domestic league appearances and goals as of 17:16, 11 January 2022 (UTC)

Emanuel Raúl Bocchino (born 9 March 1988) is an Argentine professional footballer who plays as a centre-back for Spanish club Vélez CF.

== Career ==
Independiente were the first team of Bocchino's senior career, with the defender making his sole appearance for the club on 14 December 2008 as Independiente lost to Arsenal de Sarandí in the Primera División. 2009 saw Bocchino join Quilmes, though left months later without featuring to sign for Huracán in Torneo Argentino B. After one goal in nineteen fixtures for Huracán, Bocchino completed further moves to Racing de Olavarría and Alvarado between 2011 and 2013. Bocchino was signed by Torneo Argentino A's Central Córdoba on 2 July 2013. Forty-four games and one goal later, in 2014, they won promotion to tier two.

After twenty-nine appearances in the second tier, Bocchino switched Central Córdoba for Brown in January 2016. Six months later, in June, Bocchino left his homeland for the first time to play for Bolivian Primera División side Blooming. He made his debut against Jorge Wilstermann on 14 August, prior to netting his opening goal versus San José in September. More goals came in matches with Sport Boys and Real Potosí as he made forty league appearances, as well as four in the Copa Sudamericana. Bocchino went to Primera B Metropolitana's Platense in 2017. His first season culminated with promotion as champions.

In June 2019, Bocchino headed off to Cypriot Second Division club Alki Oroklini. He made his debut on 4 October during a victory over Aris Limassol, which preceded a further sixteen appearances in all competitions in 2019–20. In September 2020, Bocchino was signed by Spanish Tercera División team Vélez.

== Career statistics ==
As of 24 December 2020.

Appearances and goals by club, season and competition
| Club | Season | League | | | Cup | | League Cup | | Continental | | Other | | Total | |
| Club | Season | Division | Apps | Goals | Apps | Goals | Apps | Goals | Apps | Goals | Apps | Goals | Apps | Goals |
|---|---|---|---|---|---|---|---|---|---|---|---|---|---|---|
| Independiente | 2008–09 | Argentine Primera División | 1 | 0 | 0 | 0 | — | | 0 | 0 | 0 | 0 | 1 | 0 |
| Quilmes | 2009–10 | Primera B Nacional | 0 | 0 | 0 | 0 | — | | — | | 0 | 0 | 0 | 0 |
| Huracán | 2010–11 | Torneo Argentino B | 19 | 1 | 0 | 0 | — | | — | | 0 | 0 | 19 | 1 |
| Racing de Olavarría | 2011–12 | Torneo Argentino A | 25 | 1 | 1 | 0 | — | | — | | 0 | 0 | 26 | 1 |
| Alvarado | 2012–13 | Torneo Argentino A | 12 | 0 | 3 | 0 | — | | — | | 4 (Note: Appearance(s) in the Torneo Argentino A play-offs) | 0 | 19 | 0 |
| Central Córdoba | 2013–14 | Torneo Argentino A | 28 | 1 | 1 | 0 | — | | — | | 2 | 0 | 31 | 1 |
| Central Córdoba | 2014 | Torneo Federal A | 14 | 0 | 0 | 0 | — | | — | | 0 | 0 | 14 | 0 |
| Central Córdoba | 2015 | Primera B Nacional | 29 | 0 | 0 | 0 | — | | — | | 0 | 0 | 29 | 0 |
| Central Córdoba | Total | | 71 | 1 | 1 | 0 | — | | — | | 2 | 0 | 74 | 1 |
| Brown | 2016 | Primera B Nacional | 10 | 0 | 0 | 0 | — | | — | | 0 | 0 | 10 | 0 |
| Blooming | 2016–17 | Bolivian Primera División | 40 | 3 | — | | — | | 4 (Note: Appearance(s) in the Copa Sudamericana) | 0 | 0 | 0 | 44 | 3 |
| Platense | 2017–18 | Primera B Metropolitana | 28 | 1 | 1 | 1 | — | | — | | 1 (Note: Appearance(s) in the Primera B Metropolitana play-offs) | 0 | 30 | 2 |
| Platense | 2018–19 | Primera B Nacional | 5 | 0 | 2 | 0 | — | | — | | 0 | 0 | 7 | 0 |
| Platense | Total | | 33 | 1 | 3 | 1 | — | | — | | 1 | 0 | 37 | 2 |
| Alki Oroklini | 2019–20 | Second Division | 15 | 0 | 2 | 0 | — | | — | | 0 | 0 | 17 | 0 |
| Vélez | 2020–21 | Tercera División | 9 | 0 | 0 | 0 | — | | — | | 0 | 0 | 9 | 0 |
| Career total | | | 235 | 7 | 10 | 1 | — | | 4 | 0 | 7 | 0 | 256 | 8 |

== Honours ==
Platense

- Primera B Metropolitana: 2017–18
