= Alfredo Sánchez =

Alfredo Sánchez may refer to:

- Alfredo Sánchez (footballer, born 1904) (1904–1991), Mexican footballer
- Alfredo Sánchez Monteseirín (1957–2026), Spanish politician
- Alfredo Sánchez (Spanish footballer) (born 1972), Spanish footballer
- Alfredo Sánchez (footballer, born 1987), Mexican footballer
