= Alfredo Gutiérrez =

Alfredo Gutiérrez may refer to:

- Alfredo Gutiérrez (American football) (born 1995), Mexican American football player
- Alfredo Gutiérrez (musician) (born 1943), Colombian accordion player and singer
- Alfredo Gutiérrez Ortiz Mena (born 1969), Mexican judge
