= Raffaella Morganti =

Italian astrophysicist and radio astronomer (b. 1958)

Raffaella Morganti (born 19 September 1958) is an Italian astrophysicist and radio astronomer active in the Netherlands. Her primary research interests are radio observations of active galaxies. She was head of the Astronomy group of ASTRON from 2007-2014 (succeeded by Michael Wise), and is currently a Senior Astronomer at ASTRON. She is also Professor of Astronomy at the University of Groningen's Kapteyn Institute.

Morganti was honored as a Commander in the Order of the Star of Italy in 2014.
