= Alfredo Challenger =

Caymanian footballer

Personal information
- Full name: Alfredo Challenger-Calix
- Date of birth: 21 August 1979 (age 47)
- Place of birth: Cayman Islands
- Position: Midfielder

Team information
- Current team: Latinos FC

Senior career*
Years	Team	Apps	(Gls)
2004–	Latinos FC		

International career^{‡}
2004–	Cayman Islands	5	(0)
- * Club domestic league appearances and goals ‡ National team caps and goals as of 16:23, 23 April 2012 (UTC)

Alfredo Challenger-Calix (born 21 August 1979) is a Caymanian footballer who plays as a midfielder. He has represented the Cayman Islands during World Cup qualifying matches in 2004, 2008 and 2011.
