= Marcelo Vega (footballer, born 1986) =

Argentine footballer

Personal information
- Full name: Marcelo Damián Vega
- Date of birth: 16 September 1986 (age 40)
- Place of birth: Isidro Casanova, Argentina
- Height: 1.74 m (5 ft 9 in)
- Position: Midfielder

Team information
- Current team: Almirante Brown

Senior career*
Years	Team	Apps	(Gls)
2006	Villa Cubas		
2006–2010	Deportivo Morón	132	(10)
2010–2012	Aldosivi	65	(3)
2012–2013	Olimpo	31	(3)
2013–2014	Talleres	17	(1)
2014	All Boys	9	(0)
2015	Barracas Central	27	(0)
2016–2017	Almirante Brown	42	(2)
2017–2021	Platense	39	(1)
2021–	Almirante Brown	27	(0)
- * Club domestic league appearances and goals as of 19:47, 8 June 2022 (UTC)

Marcelo Damián Vega (born 16 September 1986) is an Argentine professional footballer who plays as a midfielder for Almirante Brown.

== Career ==
Vega started out his career with Torneo Argentino C's Villa Cubas. Deportivo Morón of Primera B Metropolitana signed Vega in 2006. He remained in Morón for four years, scoring ten goals in one hundred and thirty-two appearances. On 30 June 2010, Vega moved to Aldosivi. He made his debut on 7 August against CAI, which was one of sixty-five matches he featured in over two seasons as they secured seventh and eleventh-place finishes; he also scored three times. Vega joined Primera B Nacional side Olimpo in 2012. He netted against Rosario Central, Ferro Carril Oeste and Atlético Tucumán as they won promotion to the Primera División.

Between 2013 and 2014, Vega had stints in the second tier with Talleres, where he suffered relegation, and All Boys before agreeing to play for Barracas Central in Primera B Metropolitana. In 2016, Almirante Brown became Vega's eighth club. Two goals in forty-two fixtures followed, with his last appearance occurring on 30 June 2017 versus Deportivo Español. Third tier Platense completed the signing of Vega in the succeeding July. His first campaign, 2017–18, concluded with Platense winning the league title to gain promotion to Primera B Nacional.

== Career statistics ==
As of 13 March 2019.

Appearances and goals by club, season and competition
Club	Season	League			Cup		Continental		Other		Total	
Club	Season	Division	Apps	Goals	Apps	Goals	Apps	Goals	Apps	Goals	Apps	Goals
Aldosivi	2010–11	Primera B Nacional	31	0	0	0	—		0	0	31	0
Aldosivi	2011–12	Primera B Nacional	34	3	1	0	—		0	0	35	3
Aldosivi	Total		65	3	1	0	—		0	0	66	3
Olimpo	2012–13	Primera B Nacional	31	3	1	0	—		0	0	32	3
Talleres	2013–14	Primera B Nacional	17	1	1	0	—		0	0	18	1
All Boys	2014	Primera B Nacional	9	0	0	0	—		0	0	9	0
Barracas Central	2015	Primera B Metropolitana	27	0	0	0	—		0	0	27	0
Almirante Brown	2016	Primera B Metropolitana	13	0	0	0	—		0	0	13	0
Almirante Brown	2016–17	Primera B Metropolitana	29	2	0	0	—		0	0	29	2
Almirante Brown	Total		42	2	0	0	—		0	0	42	2
Platense	2017–18	Primera B Metropolitana	16	1	0	0	—		0	0	16	1
Platense	2018–19	Primera B Nacional	6	0	0	0	—		0	0	6	0
Platense	Total		22	1	0	0	—		0	0	22	1
Career total			213	10	3	0	—		0	0	216	10

== Honours ==
Platense

- Primera B Metropolitana: 2017–18
