= Alfredo Gonzalez =

Alfredo Gonzalez may refer to:

- Alfredo González (baseball) (born 1992), Venezuelan baseball catcher
- Alfredo González Flores (1877–1962), president of Costa Rica in 1914–1917
- Alfredo González (sport shooter) (born 1944), Colombian Olympic sports shooter
- Alfredo González Tahuilán (born 1980), Mexican footballer
- Alfredo Cantu Gonzalez (1946–1968), US Marine Corps sergeant, posthumous Medal of Honor
- Alfredo Razon Gonzalez (born 1978), Filipino footballer

== See also ==
- Luis Alfredo Palacio González (born 1939), known as Alfredo Palacio, president of Ecuador in 2005–2007
