= Facundo Curuchet =

Argentine footballer

Personal information
- Full name: Facundo Nicolás Curuchet
- Date of birth: 21 January 1990 (age 36)
- Place of birth: Gualeguaychú, Argentina
- Height: 1.75 m (5 ft 9 in)
- Position: Forward

Team information
- Current team: Racing Cordoba
- Number: 7

Youth career
- Pueblo Nuevo
- Colón

Senior career*
Years	Team	Apps	(Gls)
2010–2015	Colón	83	(9)
2015	→ Defensa y Justicia (loan)	2	(0)
2015	→ Santamarina (loan)	17	(1)
2016	Juventud Unida	13	(1)
2016–2017	Independiente Rivadavia	29	(1)
2017–2021	Platense	64	(11)
2022–	Cienciano	33	(2)
- * Club domestic league appearances and goals as of 19:33, 18 April 2022 (UTC)

Facundo Nicolás Curuchet (born 21 January 1990) is an Argentine professional footballer who plays as a forward for Cienciano.

== Career ==
Curuchet's first club was Pueblo Nuevo, prior to a move to Colón. He made his pro debut on 16 May 2010 against Estudiantes, with the forward netting the club's only goal in a 1–4 defeat. Curuchet went on to make eighty-four appearances for the club across six seasons, five of which were in the Primera División; taking his goal tally to nine in the process, including six in the 2012–13 season. During 2012–13, he also scored on his Copa Sudamericana bow versus Racing Club in August 2012. January 2015 saw Curuchet join Defensa y Justicia on loan. Two appearances came before he returned midway through the year.

Curuchet spent the rest of 2015 with Santamarina in Primera B Nacional. After one goal and twenty-one matches for Santamarina, Curuchet subsequently departed Colón permanently after agreeing a move to Juventud Unida in February 2016. A further move in the second tier with Independiente Rivadavia arrived six months later. Ahead of the 2017–18 campaign, Curuchet signed for Primera B Metropolitana's Platense. He scored nine goals against nine opponents in his first season, helping Platense win the title to gain promotion to Primera B Nacional.

== Personal life ==
Curuchet's brother, Cristian, also played football professionally.

== Career statistics ==
As of 14 March 2019.

Appearances and goals by club, season and competition
Club	Season	League			Cup		Continental		Other		Total	
Club	Season	Division	Apps	Goals	Apps	Goals	Apps	Goals	Apps	Goals	Apps	Goals
Colón	2009–10	Primera División	1	1	0	0	0	0	0	0	1	1
Colón	2010–11	Primera División	9	0	0	0	—		0	0	9	0
Colón	2011–12	Primera División	6	0	2	0	—		0	0	8	0
Colón	2012–13	Primera División	31	6	0	0	4 (Note: Appearance(s) in the Copa Sudamericana)	1	0	0	35	7
Colón	2013–14	Primera División	30	1	0	0	—		1 (Note: Appearance(s) in the Primera División play-offs)	0	31	1
Colón	2014	Primera B Nacional	6	1	2	0	—		0	0	8	1
Colón	2015	Primera División	0	0	0	0	—		0	0	0	0
Colón	Total		83	9	4	0	4	1	1	0	92	10
Defensa y Justicia (loan)	2015	Primera División	2	0	0	0	—		0	0	2	0
Santamarina (loan)	2015	Primera B Nacional	17	1	0	0	—		4 (Note: Appearance(s) in the Primera B Nacional play-offs)	0	21	1
Juventud Unida	2016	Primera B Nacional	13	1	0	0	—		0	0	13	1
Independiente Rivadavia	2016–17	Primera B Nacional	29	1	0	0	—		0	0	29	1
Platense	2017–18	Primera B Metropolitana	34	9	1	0	—		1 (Note: Appearance(s) in the Primera B Metropolitana play-offs)	0	36	9
Platense	2018–19	Primera B Nacional	4	2	2	0	—		0	0	6	2
Platense	Total		38	11	3	0	—		1	0	42	11
Career total			182	23	7	0	4	1	6	0	199	24

== Honours ==
Platense

- Primera B Metropolitana: 2017–18
