= Atlético Santa Rosa =

- Full name: Club Atlético Santa Rosa
- Nickname(s): Albo
- Founded: June 5, 1923
- Ground: Estadio Mateo Calderón, Santa Rosa, La Pampa, Argentina
- Capacity: 6,000
- League: Liga Cultural de Fútbol de La Pampa
- 2011: 1st of Zona A
- Website: http://www.casr.com.ar/
| Home colours | Away colours |

Club Atlético Santa Rosa, known simply as Atlético Santa Rosa, is an Argentine football club based in Santa Rosa, La Pampa. The team currently plays in the Liga Cultural de Fútbol de La Pampa, a regional league of Argentina, where has won 10 titles to date.

In 1983, Atlético Santa Rosa qualified to play in the 1983 Campeonato Nacional of the Argentine Primera División. However, the team was eliminated after losing all six of their games. With this being its only season in the Argentine topflight, Atlético is positioned last in the All-time Argentine Primera División table, with 6 games lost (all the ones it played), 4 goals for and 24 against (−20 of goal difference).

== Titles ==
- Liga Cultural de Fútbol de La Pampa: 10

1951, 1956, 1960, 1975, 1982, 1992, 1993, 1999, 2003, 2010

- Torneo Regional Patagónico: 1

1983
