= Nicolás Lugli =

Argentine professional footballer

Personal information
- Full name: Nicolás Pedro Lugli
- Date of birth: 9 July 1996 (age 30)
- Place of birth: Don Torcuato, Argentina
- Height: 1.80 m (5 ft 11 in)
- Position: Forward

Team information
- Current team: Montereale Calcio 1970
- Number: 9

Youth career
- Deportivo Villa de Mayo
- Unión Florida
- CA Platense

Senior career*
| Years | Team | Apps | (Gls) |
| 2015–2019 | CA Platense | 19 | (0) |
| 2018–2019 | → Deportivo Español (loan) | 17 | (0) |
| 2019 | → San Miguel (loan) | 13 | (1) |
| 2020 | Platense FC | 19 | (2) |
| 2021–2022 | Ituzaingó | 66 | (8) |
| 2023–2024 | Sololá | 15 | (5) |
| 2024–2025 | Virtus Rosarno | 30 | (17) |
| 2025–2026 | Ags Soriano Fabrizia | 11 | (8) |
| 2026–2027 | Montereale Calcio 1970 | 2 | (2) |
- * Club domestic league appearances and goals as of 19:57, 27 July 2023 (UTC)

Nicolás Pedro Lugli (born 9 July 1996) is an Argentine professional footballer who plays as a forward for Montereale Calcio 1970 in Italia .

== Career ==
Before Lugli joined CA Platense, the forward had stints with Deportivo Villa de Mayo and Unión Florida. He made two sub appearances for Platense in 2015, prior to appearing as a starter for the first time in October 2016 during a 1–1 draw away to Acassuso. After twenty appearances across four campaigns with Platense, the last concluding with promotion to Primera B Nacional, Lugli left on loan in August 2018 to Primera B Metropolitana's Deportivo Español. He was sent off on his first start in a September fixture with Deportivo Riestra, which was one of seventeen appearances for the club as they were relegated.

July 2019 saw Lugli make a loan return to tier three with San Miguel. He scored his first senior goal on 15 September away to Defensores Unidos, prior to his departure mid-season. In January 2020, Lugli permanently switched Argentina's CA Platense for their Honduras namesakes Platense FC. He remained for half of 2019–20 and half of 2020–21, featuring nineteen times in Liga Nacional whilst scoring twice; against Marathón and Honduras Progreso respectively. In early 2021, Lugli returned to his homeland with Primera C Metropolitana's Ituzaingó. He netted on his unofficial debut on 24 February versus Cañuelas.

In January 2023, Lugli joined Guatemalan club Sololá FC.

== Career statistics ==
As of 25 February 2021.

Appearances and goals by club, season and competition
| Club | Season | League | | | Cup | | League Cup | | Continental | | Other | | Total | |
| Club | Season | Division | Apps | Goals | Apps | Goals | Apps | Goals | Apps | Goals | Apps | Goals | Apps | Goals |
|---|---|---|---|---|---|---|---|---|---|---|---|---|---|---|
| CA Platense | 2015 | Primera B Metropolitana | 2 | 0 | 0 | 0 | — | | — | | 0 | 0 | 2 | 0 |
| CA Platense | 2016 | Primera B Metropolitana | 0 | 0 | 0 | 0 | — | | — | | 0 | 0 | 0 | 0 |
| CA Platense | 2016–17 | Primera B Metropolitana | 6 | 0 | 0 | 0 | — | | — | | 1 (Note: Appearance(s) in the Primera B Metropolitana play-offs) | 0 | 7 | 0 |
| CA Platense | 2017–18 | Primera B Metropolitana | 11 | 0 | 0 | 0 | — | | — | | 0 | 0 | 11 | 0 |
| CA Platense | 2018–19 | Primera B Nacional | 0 | 0 | 0 | 0 | — | | — | | 0 | 0 | 0 | 0 |
| CA Platense | Total | | 19 | 0 | 0 | 0 | — | | — | | 1 | 0 | 20 | 0 |
| Deportivo Español (loan) | 2018–19 | Primera B Metropolitana | 17 | 0 | 0 | 0 | — | | — | | 0 | 0 | 17 | 0 |
| San Miguel (loan) | 2019–20 | Primera B Metropolitana | 13 | 1 | 0 | 0 | — | | — | | 0 | 0 | 13 | 1 |
| Platense FC | 2019–20 | Liga Nacional | 9 | 2 | 0 | 0 | — | | — | | 0 | 0 | 9 | 2 |
| Platense FC | 2020–21 | Liga Nacional | 10 | 0 | 0 | 0 | — | | — | | 0 | 0 | 10 | 0 |
| Platense FC | Total | | 19 | 2 | 0 | 0 | — | | — | | 0 | 0 | 19 | 2 |
| Ituzaingó | 2021 | Primera C Metropolitana | 0 | 0 | 0 | 0 | — | | — | | 0 | 0 | 0 | 0 |
| Career total | | | 68 | 3 | 0 | 0 | — | | — | | 1 | 0 | 69 | 3 |

== Honours ==
Platense

- Primera B Metropolitana: 2017–18
