= Alfredo Hernández (footballer, born 1951) =

Mexican footballer

Personal information
- Full name: Alfredo Hernández Martínez
- Date of birth: 12 January 1951
- Date of death: 6 January 2021 (aged 69)
- Position: Forward

Senior career*
Years	Team	Apps	(Gls)
1968–1969	Chalco		
1969–1970	León Reserves		
1970–1971	América Reserves		
1972–1977	Puebla		
1977	Atlante		
1978	Querétaro		

International career
1971–1972	Mexico Olympic		
- * Club domestic league appearances and goals

Alfredo Hernández (12 January 1951 – 6 January 2021), nicknamed El Olímpico, was a Mexican footballer who played as a winger. He competed in the men's tournament at the 1972 Summer Olympics. After retiring from professional sports, he worked as a P.E. teacher at Colegio Humboldt Puebla.
