= Tomás Luján =

Argentine footballer

Personal information
- Date of birth: 28 January 2000 (age 26)
- Place of birth: Grand Bourg, Argentina
- Height: 1.75 m (5 ft 9 in)
- Position: Forward

Team information
- Current team: Platense

Youth career
- Platense

Senior career*
Years	Team	Apps	(Gls)
2019–	Platense	3	(0)
2020	→ Internacional B (loan)		
- * Club domestic league appearances and goals as of 23:04, 4 August 2020 (UTC)

Tomás Nahuel Luján (born 28 January 2000) is an Argentine footballer currently playing as a forward for Platense.

== Career ==
Luján is a product of Platense. In March 2020, Luján was loaned out to Brazilian club Internacional for the rest of the year with an option for the club to buy 50% of his rights for a fee around $400,000. Luján was initially playing for the clubs reserve team.

In September 2020, during his loan spell at Internacional, Luján suffered an anterior cruciate ligament injury, after he collided with a teammate in the middle of training session. However, the loan deal was extended for six months further in January 2021, while he was still recovering.

Luján returned to Platense again in July 2021. Already a month later, Luján unfortunately suffered the same anterior cruciate ligament injury during a reserve league game for Platense.

== Career statistics ==
=== Club ===
As of 12 April 2020.

Club	Season	League			Cup		Continental		Other		Total	
Club	Season	Division	Apps	Goals	Apps	Goals	Apps	Goals	Apps	Goals	Apps	Goals
Platense	2018–19	Primera B Nacional	1	0	0	0	–		0	0	1	0
Platense	2019–20	Primera B Nacional	2	0	1 (Note: Appearances in the Copa Argentina)	0	–		0	0	3	0
Platense	Total		3	0	1	0	0	0	0	0	4	0
Internacional (loan)	2020	Série A	0	0	0	0	0	0	0	0	0	0
Career total			3	0	1	0	0	0	0	0	4	0
