= Alfredo Padilla =

Colombian footballer (born 1989)

Personal information
- Full name: Alfredo Antonio Padilla Gutiérrez
- Date of birth: 29 July 1989 (age 37)
- Place of birth: Barranquilla, Colombia
- Height: 1.65 m (5 ft 5 in)
- Position: Striker

Senior career*
Years	Team	Apps	(Gls)
2007–2011	Atlético Junior	61	(8)
2009	→ La Equidad (loan)	1	(0)
2009	→ Atlético Huila (loan)	3	(0)
2012–	Boyacá Chicó		
- * Club domestic league appearances and goals as of 16:26, 10 March 2012 (UTC)

Alfredo Antonio Padilla Gutiérrez (born 29 July 1989) is a Colombian football striker who plays for Boyacá Chicó F.C. in the Copa Mustang.

== Club career ==
Padilla began his professional career with Junior in 2007, where he was promoted to first team by manager Carlos Valderrama when he was only 17 years of age. He joined La Equidad in February 2009.
