= Gastón Suso =

Argentine footballer (born 1991)

Personal information
- Full name: Gastón Suso
- Date of birth: 12 March 1991 (age 35)
- Place of birth: Arrufó, Argentina
- Height: 1.90 m (6 ft 3 in)
- Position: Centre-back

Team information
- Current team: Atlético Tucumán
- Number: 20

Youth career
- Atlético de Rafaela

Senior career*
| Years | Team | Apps | (Gls) |
| 2013 | Atlético de Rafaela | 0 | (0) |
| 2013–2015 | Gimnasia y Tiro | 53 | (0) |
| 2016 | Mitre | 12 | (1) |
| 2016–2018 | Godoy Cruz | 1 | (0) |
| 2017–2018 | → Estudiantes (loan) | 48 | (1) |
| 2018–2019 | Atlético de Rafaela | 9 | (1) |
| 2019–2025 | Platense | 123 | (4) |
| 2020–2021 | → Arsenal Sarandí (loan) | 33 | (1) |
| 2025–2026 | Gimnasia LP | 27 | (1) |
| 2026– | Atlético Tucumán | 16 | (0) |
- * Club domestic league appearances and goals as of 16:42, 26 May 2026 (UTC)

Gastón Suso (born 12 March 1991) is an Argentine professional footballer who plays as a centre-back for Atlético Tucumán.

== Career ==
Suso's career began in 2013 with Atlético de Rafaela. He didn't make a league appearance for the club, but did feature once during a Copa Argentina defeat to San Lorenzo on 19 June 2013. In July 2013, Suso departed Atlético de Rafaela to sign for Gimnasia y Tiro of Torneo Argentino A. He made his league debut on 18 August in a win over Tiro Federal, prior to scoring his first goal in May 2014 against Guillermo Brown. He made twenty-nine appearances in his first season, before fourteen and twelve in the two following seasons. 2016 saw Suso join fellow Torneo Federal A team Mitre. One goal in fourteen games followed.

On 5 July 2016, Suso was signed by Argentine Primera División side Godoy Cruz. He made his professional debut on 30 September in a home victory over Unión Santa Fe. In February 2017, Suso was loaned out to Primera B Metropolitana's Estudiantes. After completing his Estudiantes loan, Suso sealed a return to Atlético de Rafaela in June 2018.

== Career statistics ==
As of 11 September 2018.

Club statistics
| Club | Season | League | | | Cup (Note: Includes the Copa Argentina) | | League Cup | | Continental (Note: Includes the Copa Libertadores) | | Other (Note: Includes the Torneo Argentino A, Torneo Federal A and Primera B Metropolitana play-offs) | | Total | |
| Club | Season | Division | Apps | Goals | Apps | Goals | Apps | Goals | Apps | Goals | Apps | Goals | Apps | Goals |
|---|---|---|---|---|---|---|---|---|---|---|---|---|---|---|
| Atlético de Rafaela | 2012–13 | Primera División | 0 | 0 | 1 | 0 | — | | — | | 0 | 0 | 1 | 0 |
| Gimnasia y Tiro | 2013–14 | Torneo Argentino A | 27 | 0 | 1 | 0 | — | | — | | 2 (Note: Two appearances in 2013–14 Torneo Argentino A play-offs) | 1 (Note: One goal in 2013–14 Torneo Argentino A play-offs) | 30 | 1 |
| Gimnasia y Tiro | 2014 | Torneo Federal A | 14 | 0 | 2 | 0 | — | | — | | 0 | 0 | 16 | 0 |
| Gimnasia y Tiro | 2015 | Torneo Federal A | 12 | 0 | 0 | 0 | — | | — | | 0 | 0 | 12 | 0 |
| Gimnasia y Tiro | Total | | 53 | 0 | 3 | 0 | — | | — | | 0 | 0 | 58 | 1 |
| Mitre | 2016 | Torneo Federal A | 12 | 1 | 0 | 0 | — | | — | | 2 (Note: Two appearances in 2016 Torneo Federal A play-offs) | 0 | 14 | 1 |
| Godoy Cruz | 2016–17 | Primera División | 1 | 0 | 0 | 0 | — | | 0 | 0 | 0 | 0 | 1 | 0 |
| Godoy Cruz | 2017–18 | Primera División | 0 | 0 | 0 | 0 | — | | 0 | 0 | 0 | 0 | 0 | 0 |
| Godoy Cruz | Total | | 1 | 0 | 0 | 0 | — | | 0 | 0 | 0 | 0 | 1 | 0 |
| Estudiantes (loan) | 2016–17 | Primera B Metropolitana | 14 | 0 | 1 | 0 | — | | — | | 3 (Note: Three appearances in 2016–17 Primera B Metropolitana play-offs) | 0 | 18 | 0 |
| Estudiantes (loan) | 2017–18 | Primera B Metropolitana | 34 | 1 | 0 | 0 | — | | — | | 3 (Note: Three appearances in 2017–18 Primera B Metropolitana play-offs) | 0 | 37 | 1 |
| Estudiantes (loan) | Total | | 48 | 1 | 1 | 0 | — | | — | | 6 | 0 | 55 | 1 |
| Atlético de Rafaela | 2018–19 | Primera B Nacional | 2 | 0 | 2 | 0 | — | | — | | 0 | 0 | 4 | 0 |
| Career total | | | 116 | 2 | 7 | 0 | — | | 0 | 0 | 10 | 1 | 133 | 3 |
