= Nicolás Morgantini =

Argentine footballer

Personal information
- Full name: Nicolás Jorge Morgantini
- Date of birth: 11 September 1994 (age 32)
- Place of birth: San Isidro, Argentina
- Height: 1.75 m (5 ft 9 in)
- Position: Right-back

Team information
- Current team: Lanús
- Number: 3

Youth career
- Platense

Senior career*
Years	Team	Apps	(Gls)
2013–2020	Platense	111	(4)
2020–	Lanús	38	(0)
2022–2023	→ Platense (loan)	57	(4)
- * Club domestic league appearances and goals as of 17:04, 6 June 2026 (UTC)

Nicolás Jorge Morgantini (born 11 September 1994) is an Argentine professional footballer who plays as a right-back for Lanús.

== Club career ==
Morgantini got his senior career underway in 2013 with Platense. After being an unused substitute for the club's 6–1 defeat in the Copa Argentina to Estudiantes on 4 December, he made his professional bow in Primera B Metropolitana days later versus Deportivo Armenio. Morgantini scored his first senior goal against the same opponents in November 2014, netting the sole strike in the thirty-sixth minute away from home. He made seventy-one appearances across his first six seasons with Platense, the last concluded with promotion as champions to Primera B Nacional in 2017–18.

On 16 January 2020, Morgantini joined Lanús on a deal until the end of 2022. Due to lack of playing time, Morgantini returned to Platense in January 2022, on a loan deal for the rest of 2022.

== International career ==
In 2015, Morgantini was selected to train with the Argentina U23s.

== Career statistics ==
As of 10 March 2019.

Appearances and goals by club, season and competition
Club	Season	League			Cup		Continental		Other		Total	
Club	Season	Division	Apps	Goals	Apps	Goals	Apps	Goals	Apps	Goals	Apps	Goals
Platense	2013–14	Primera B Metropolitana	7	0	0	0	—		1 (Note: Appearance(s) in the Primera B Metropolitana play-offs)	0	8	0
Platense	2014	Primera B Metropolitana	16	1	1	0	—		0	0	17	1
Platense	2015	Primera B Metropolitana	6	0	0	0	—		0	0	6	0
Platense	2016	Primera B Metropolitana	10	0	0	0	—		0	0	10	0
Platense	2016–17	Primera B Metropolitana	3	0	0	0	—		1	0	4	0
Platense	2017–18	Primera B Metropolitana	26	0	1	0	—		1	0	28	0
Platense	2018–19	Primera B Nacional	16	2	2	0	—		0	0	18	2
Career total			84	3	4	0	—		3	0	91	3

== Honours ==
Platense

- Primera B Metropolitana: 2017–18

Lanús

- Copa Sudamericana: 2025
