= Alfredo Jesus da Silva =

Portuguese footballer

Alfredo
Personal information
- Full name: Alfredo Jesus da Silva
- Place of birth: Portugal
- Position: Defender

Senior career*
Years	Team	Apps	(Gls)
1968–1970	Boavista	16	(0)
1970	Toronto First Portuguese		
- * Club domestic league appearances and goals

Alfredo Jesus da Silva is a Portuguese former footballer who played as a defender.

== Career ==
Alfredo played in the Segunda Divisão in 1968 with Boavista F.C. The following season he played in the Primeira Divisão where he made 16 appearances. In the summer of 1970 he played abroad in the National Soccer League with Toronto First Portuguese. In his debut season with Toronto he assisted in securing the NSL Cup against Toronto Hellas.
