= Alfredo Rivadeneyra Hernández =

Mexican politician

- Born: 8 June 1971 (age 54); Tlalnepantla de Baz, Mexico State, Mexico
- Occupation: Deputy
- Political party: PAN

Alfredo Rivadeneyra Hernández (born 8 June 1971) is a Mexican politician affiliated with the PAN. He currently serves as Deputy of the LXII Legislature of the Mexican Congress representing the Mexico State.
