= Gianluca Pugliese =

Argentine footballer

Personal information
- Date of birth: 7 March 1997 (age 29)
- Place of birth: Buenos Aires, Argentina
- Height: 1.79 m (5 ft 10 in)
- Position: Forward

Team information
- Current team: Güemes

Youth career
- Platense

Senior career*
Years	Team	Apps	(Gls)
2017–2025	Platense	30	(3)
2021	→ Estudiantes BA (loan)	11	(1)
2021	→ Mitre SdE (loan)	15	(0)
2022	→ San Telmo (loan)	31	(4)
2023	→ Chacarita Juniors (loan)	30	(4)
2024	→ Atlético de Rafaela (loan)	5	(0)
2025–2026	Defensores de Belgrano	15	(0)
2026–	Güemes	6	(0)
- * Club domestic league appearances and goals as of 17:07, 29 April 2026 (UTC)

Gianluca Pugliese (born 7 March 1997) is an Argentine professional footballer who played as a forward for Güemes.

== Career ==
Pugliese is a product of the Platense academy. He made the move into senior football in 2017–18 under Fernando Ruiz, who selected Pugliese for his professional debut in November 2017. He was substituted on at the interval of a Primera B Metropolitana match with Comunicaciones, going on to score the club's only goal in a 1–1 draw. Another goal followed on 13 April 2018 versus Barracas Central, as he ended the season with six appearances, all of which off the bench, as Platense won the league title. His first start arrived in September against Deportivo Morón in Primera B Nacional.

In February 2021, Pugliese was loaned out to Estudiantes de Buenos Aires until the end of 2021. However, the loan spell was cut short, as Platense announced on 29 July 2021, that Pugliese had moved to Club Atlético Mitre instead, once again on a loan deal until the end of 2021. Ahead of the 2022 season, he was sent out on a new loan spell, this time to San Telmo.

After being loaned to Chacarita Juniors and Atlético de Rafaela, he was released by Platense in January 2025 and signed a contract with Defensores de Belgrano of Argentina's Primera Nacional.

== Career statistics ==
As of 31 August 2020.

Appearances and goals by club, season and competition
Club	Season	League			Cup		Continental		Other		Total	
Club	Season	Division	Apps	Goals	Apps	Goals	Apps	Goals	Apps	Goals	Apps	Goals
Platense	2017–18	Primera B Metropolitana	6	2	0	0	—		0	0	6	2
Platense	2018–19	Primera B Nacional	15	0	0	0	—		0	0	15	0
Platense	2019–20	Primera B Nacional	6	1	1	0	—		0	0	7	1
Platense	Total		27	3	1	0	—		0	0	28	3
Almirante Brown	2020–21	Primera B Metropolitana	0	0	0	0	—		0	0	0	0
Career total			27	3	1	0	—		0	0	28	3

== Honours ==
Platense

- Primera B Metropolitana: 2017–18
