= Real Pilar Fútbol Club =

Argentine association football club

Real Pilar
- Full name: Real Pilar Fútbol Club
- Nickname: Monarca
- Founded: February 17, 2017; 9 years ago
- Ground: Municipal Carlos Barraza, Pilar, Buenos Aires
- Capacity: 10,000
- Chairman: César Mansilla
- Manager: Tomás Arrotea Molina
- League: Primera B Nacional
- 2024: 1st (champion, promoted)
- Website: realpilarfutbolclub.com
Home colours	Away colours

Real Pilar Fútbol Club is a football club located in Pilar, a city of Buenos Aires Province. The squad currently plays in Primera B Metropolitana, the third division of the Argentine football league system, having debuted in the 2017–18 season.

The team plays its home venues at Municipal Stadium Carlos Barraza of Pilar.

== History ==
=== Beginnings ===
It was founded by César Mansilla, Lucio José Matteazzi, Néstor Daniel Berdote, Rodrigo Dib, Christian Daniel López, María Soledad Gibelli, Alfredo Enrique Ventura, Julián Emiliano Romero Fischer, Carlos Alberto Moya, among others. The brand new club plays its home games at the “Carlos Barraza” stadium, where it also has its headquarters.

=== Affiliation to AFA ===
At the meeting of May 30, 2017, the Executive Committee of the Argentine Football Association accepted the provisional direct affiliation of the institution, ad referendum of the next ordinary assembly, and enabled its participation in the Primera D championship.5 This The decision aroused controversy, due to its surprise and unusual nature, and the known relationship of the main promoter of the entity with relevant figures of the ruling alliance: the president of the Nation, Mauricio Macri, and the vice president of the AFA, Daniel Angelici. The causality between both events has been denied.6

His official debut occurred on September 3, 2017, with a 3-1 defeat against Victoriano Arenas, at the Saturnino Moure stadium.7

On October 19, 2017, the AFA Ordinary Assembly ratified the affiliation, which became effective.8

On June 20, 2019, he was promoted to Primera C, after beating Liniers in the reduced final by an aggregate of 2 to 0.9.

On Saturday, August 3, 2019, he debuted in the Primera C, the fourth category of Argentine soccer with a 2-0 victory for the local team against Victoriano Arenas.

=== Qualification for Copa Argentina ===
At the end of 2018, Real Pilar reached second place in the partial table of the first round of the 2018-19 First D Championship, qualifying for the 2018-19 Copa Argentina. In its debut in that tournament, it won to Vélez Sarsfield on the Temperley field, 1 to 0. Thus, it was the first fifth category team to qualify for the round of 32, in addition to being the first fifth division team to have eliminated a First Division team.

On July 27, 2019, they defeated Belgrano 1-0 in Cutral Có, (Neuquen) and reached the round of 16, in another unprecedented event.

Finally, on September 25, 2019, Real Pilar was eliminated in the round of 16 by 4 to 3 on penalties against Estudiantes de Caseros, after drawing 1 to 1 in the 90 minutes.

In 2020 Real Pilar qualified again but was eliminated in the first instance by 3 to 1 against Lanús.

Real Pilar won their first title in 2024, when the team crowned as the unbeaten champions of Primera C Metropolitana, also promoting to Primera B Metro.

== Players ==
=== Current squad ===
As of 18 September 2021

Note: Flags indicate national team as defined under FIFA eligibility rules; some limited exceptions apply. Players may hold more than one non-FIFA nationality.

No.	Pos.	Nation	Player
—	GK	ARG	Matias Cano
—	DF	ARG	Luis Monge
—	DF	ARG	Rodrigo Chao
—	DF	ARG	Geronimo Govi
—	DF	URU	Juan Rodriguez Silva
—	MD	ARG	Matias Crocco
—	MF	ARG	Nahuel Rios
—	MF	ARG	Martin Gomez
—	MF	ARG	Lucas Chambi
—	DC	ARG	Rodrigo Hernandez
—	DC	ARG	Eloy Rodruiguez

== Female football ==
Real Pilar FC has also a women's football team that played its first official match in the Second Division. Therefore, Real Pilar became the first club in Argentine football history to debut with men's and women's team in the same season.

== Titles ==
- Primera C (1): 2024
