= Alfredo Ramírez =

Argentine footballer (born 1987)

Personal information
- Full name: Alfredo Germán Ramírez
- Date of birth: February 19, 1987 (age 39)
- Place of birth: Santa Fe, Argentina
- Height: 1.86 m (6 ft 1 in)
- Position: Attacking midfielder

Team information
- Current team: Platense

Youth career
- Colón

Senior career*
Years	Team	Apps	(Gls)
2008–2011	Colón	59	(6)
2012	→ Rangers Talca (loan)	0	(0)
2012–2013	Boca Unidos	13	(0)
2013–2014	Sport Boys	14	(0)
2014	Santamarina	17	(0)
2015	Sportivo Belgrano	34	(3)
2016–2017	Juventud Unida	56	(7)
2017–2019	Central Córdoba	47	(4)
2019–	Platense 2022 Club Juventud Unida (Candioti)	10	(2)
- * Club domestic league appearances and goals as of 16:45, 7 November 2019 (UTC)

Alfredo Germán Ramírez (born 19 February 1987 in Santa Fe) is an Argentine football midfielder. He currently plays for Club Atlético Platense of the Primera B Nacional.

== Career ==
Ramírez made his debut on 18 October 2008 for Colón in a 1–2 home defeat by Independiente at the age of 19.
