= Atlético Tucumán =

- Full name: Club Atlético Tucumán
- Nicknames: Decano (The Dean); Pituco; El Gigante del Norte (The Northern Giant)
- Founded: 27 September 1902; 124 years ago
- Ground: Estadio Monumental José Fierro
- Capacity: 35,200
- Chairman: Mario Leito
- Manager: Miguel Abbondándolo
- Coach: Julio César Falcioni
- League: Liga Profesional
- 2025: 3rd.
- Website: clubatleticotucuman.com.ar
Home colours	Away colours	Third colours

Club Atlético Tucumán, mostly known as Atlético Tucumán is an Argentine football club based in the city of San Miguel de Tucumán of Tucumán Province. Although several sports are practised at the club, Atlético is mostly known for its football team, which currently plays in the Primera División, the first division of the Argentine football league system.

Other activities hosted by the institution are basketball, chess, field hockey, handball, futsal and karate.

== History ==
The club was founded on September 27, 1902. Agenor Albornoz who was named first president, José Fierro, Tomás Barber, Manuel Pérez, Federico Rossi, J.A. Beaumont and three English brothers: Cecil. Claude and Percy Hill were some of the illustrious names that signed the founding charter, which makes Atlético the oldest football club from the province of Tucumán.

Atlético has played nine seasons in the Primera Division: eight seasons between 1973 and 1981, and a single season in 1984. The team's best-ever performance in Primera División was in 1979, when they reached the semi-finals of the Torneo Nacional.

In 2008, Atlético Tucumán was promoted to the Primera Nacional, the second division, after defeating Racing de Córdoba in the final game of Torneo Argentino A, and one year later the squad achieved its 2nd consecutive promotion by winning the B Nacional tournament and reaching the Primera División.

Thanks to a 5th-place finish in the 2016 Primera División, the club was able to play the 2017 Copa Libertadores, their first ever continental participation. Atlético began the competition in the second stage, where they beat Ecuadorian club El Nacional 3–2. This match was strange, as the club used the Argentina national team kit to play. In the next stage, they beat Colombian club Junior by the same score, qualifying to the group stage. In the group stage, the club finished 3rd, with 2 wins, one draw, and three losses, and was transferred to the Copa Sudamericana. They entered the Copa Sudamericana in the second stage, where they beat Bolivian club Oriente Petrolero 6–2. In the next round, they were eliminated by Argentine club Independiente, who eventually was the tournament champion. The club won the first leg at home 1–0, but lost the second leg 2–0.

The club reached the final of the 2016–17 Copa Argentina for the first time in its history, after beating All Boys, Independiente (who had beat them in the Copa Sudamericana), Sarmiento, Vélez Sarsfield, and Rosario Central. In the final on 9 December 2017 at Estadio Malvinas Argentinas, River Plate won 2–1, but the club still qualified to the 2018 Copa Libertadores group stage because they reached the final.

The club has its best international performance in the 2018 Copa Libertadores. They finished second with 10 points in a group containing Club Libertad, The Strongest, and Peñarol. In the round of 16, they beat Atlético Nacional, and got into the quarter-finals, where they were knocked out by defending champions Gremio.

== Rivals ==
The Tucumán Derby is played between Atlético and its longtime rival San Martín, both of the same city. The Santo (as San Martín is nicknamed) currently plays in the Primera Nacional, the second division. There have been long intervals where the derby wasn't played because both clubs were in different divisions, as is the case in the present day.

== Stadium ==
The stadium was constructed in 1922 by Spanish architect José Graña (1885–1950) with an original capacity for 5,000 spectators. It was inaugurated on May 21 of same year. Originally named as "Grand Stadium" due to being the largest of the North side of Argentina, Racing Club de Avellaneda was invited to play a friendly match versus Atlético Tucumán as part of the celebration. The stadium was named Monumental "José Fierro" in honor of the club's second president, Jose Fierro.

It was the first roof stadium in Tucumán Province and the first to have a superior stand. The structure was built out of concrete.

The stadium is located in the north part of the city of San Miguel de Tucumán (named "Barrio Norte"). It can currently accommodate up to 32,500 people due to an upgrade of the facilities that included adding an extra 2,500 seats.

== Players ==
=== Current squad ===
As of 26 July 2026

Note: Flags indicate national team as defined under FIFA eligibility rules; some limited exceptions apply. Players may hold more than one non-FIFA nationality.

No.	Pos.	Nation	Player
1	GK	ARG	Luis Ingolotti
2	DF	ARG	Ramiro Paunero
3	DF	URU	Maximiliano Villa
6	DF	ARG	Gianluca Ferrari
7	FW	ARG	Martín Benítez
8	MF	SYR	Ezequiel Ham
9	FW	ARG	Leandro Díaz
11	MF	ARG	Renzo Tesuri
12	GK	ARG	Patricio Albornoz
14	FW	ARG	Alexis Canelo
15	FW	ARG	Rodrigo Granillo
16	DF	ARG	Moisés Brandán
17	GK	ARG	Enrique Maza
18	MF	ARG	Ramiro Ruiz Rodríguez
19	MF	ARG	Leonel Vega

No.	Pos.	Nation	Player
20	DF	ARG	Gastón Suso
22	MF	ARG	Facundo Pimienta
23	MF	ARG	Nicolás Laméndola
24	DF	ARG	Leonel Di Plácido
25	GK	ARG	Tomás Durso
28	MF	ARG	Gabriel Compagnucci
29	FW	ARG	Martín Ortega
31	MF	ARG	Lautaro Godoy
32	DF	ARG	Juan Infante
33	DF	ARG	Ramiro González
35	FW	ARG	Gabriel Abeldaño
36	DF	ARG	Luciano Vallejo
37	MF	ARG	Ezequiel Godoy
38	DF	ARG	Juan Posse

=== Out on loan ===
Note: Flags indicate national team as defined under FIFA eligibility rules; some limited exceptions apply. Players may hold more than one non-FIFA nationality.

No.	Pos.	Nation	Player
9	FW	ARG	Mateo Bajamich (at Estudiantes RC until 31 December 2026)
11	FW	ARG	Mateo Coronel (at Querétaro until 31 December 2026)

=== Current coaching staff ===
Position	Staff
Head coach	(Argentina) Julio César Falcioni
Assistant coach	(Argentina) Omar Piccoli
Assistant coach	(Argentina) Leandro Somoza
Fitness coach	(Argentina) Kenshi Piccoli
Goalkeeping coach	(Argentina) Carlos Barrionuevo
Video analyst	(Argentina) José Chavarría
Doctor	(Argentina) Juan Pablo Rojano
Kinesiologist	(Argentina) Patricio Peralta
Kinesiologist	(Argentina) Fernando Estrada
Kinesiologist	(Argentina) Maximiliano Alfaro
Nutritionist	(Argentina) Belén Varela
Masseur	(Argentina) Dante Cortéz
Masseur	(Argentina) Eduardo Quinteros
Kit man	(Argentina) Mario Quiroga
Kit man	(Argentina) Daniel Mancinelli
Kit man	(Argentina) Marcelo Albrecht

Last updated: 4 May 2025
Source: Cuerpo Tecnico

== Managers ==
- (Argentina) Jorge Solari (Jul 2006 – Jun 2008)
- (Argentina) Héctor Rivoira (Jul 2008 – Nov 2009)
- (Argentina) Osvaldo Sosa (Nov 2009 – Mar 2010)
- (Argentina) Mario Gómez (Mar 2010 – Jun 2010)
- (Argentina) Adrián Czornomaz (Jul 2010 – Jun 2011)
- (Argentina) Jorge Solari (Jul 2011 – Oct 2011)
- (Argentina) Juan Manuel Llop (Oct 2011 – Jun 2012)
- (Argentina) Ricardo Rodríguez (Jul 2012 – Nov 2013)
- (Argentina) Héctor Rivoira (Apr 2014 – Nov 2014)
- (Argentina) Juan Manuel Azconzábal (Nov 2014 – Nov 2016)
- (Argentina) Pablo Lavallén (Nov 2016 – Jun 2017)
- (Argentina) Ricardo Zielinski (Jun 2017 – Jan 2021)
- (Argentina) Omar De Felippe (Jan 2021 – Oct 2021)
- (Argentina) Pablo Guiñazú (Oct 2021 – Nov 2021)
- (Argentina) Juan Manuel Azconzábal (Dec 2021 – Apr 2022)
- (Argentina) Lucas Pusineri (Apr 2022 – Jun 2023)
- (Argentina) Favio Orsi and (Argentina) Sergio Gómez (Jul 2023 – Feb 2024)
- (Argentina) Facundo Sava (Mar 2024 – Feb 2025)
- (Argentina) Lucas Pusineri (Feb 2025 – Oct 2025)
- (Argentina) Hugo Colace (Oct 2025 – Feb 2026)
- (Argentina) Ramiro González (Feb 2026 – Mar 2026)
- (Argentina) Julio César Falcioni (Mar 2026 – )

== Honours ==
=== National ===
==== League ====
- Primera B Nacional (2): 2008–09, 2015
- Torneo Argentino A (1): 2007–08
- Torneo del Interior (1): 1986-87

==== National cups ====
- Copa de Campeones de la República Argentina (1): 1959–60 (Note: Competition organised by AFA's "Consejo Federal", held in 1959. It was contested by clubs from regional leagues outside Buenos Aires with no direct affiliation to the Association. The AFA gave this title official status in October 2024.)

=== Regional ===
- Federación Tucumana (21): 1920, 1921, 1924, 1927, 1930, 1935, 1937, 1938, 1942, 1951, 1957, 1958, 1959, 1960, 1961, 1962, 1963, 1964, 1972, 1973, 1975
- Liga Tucumana (7): 1977, 1978, 1979, 1983, 1986, 2003, 2016
- Torneo de Competencia (8): 1926, 1939, 1944, 1945, 1946, 1951, 1953, 1957
- Campeonato de Honor (13): 1935, 1936, 1937, 1938, 1939, 1944, 1952, 1954, 1956, 1957, 1958, 1959, 1963
