= Club Atlético Lugano =

Argentine association football club

Lugano
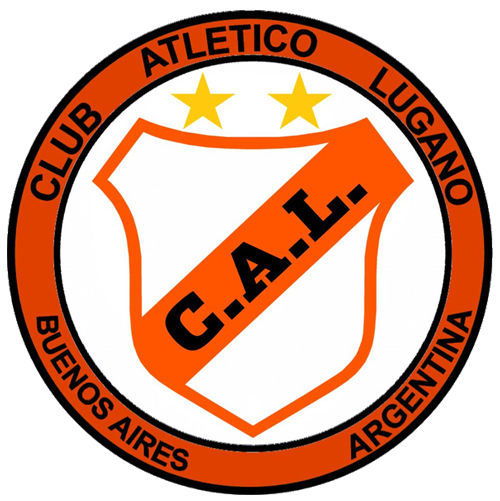
- Full name: Club Atlético Lugano
- Nickname(s): Naranja
- Founded: 18 November 1915; 109 years ago
- Ground: Club Atlético Lugano, Tapiales; Greater Buenos Aires
- Capacity: 2,950
- Chairman: Sergio Corrales
- Manager: (Argentina) Blas Viedma
- League: Primera C
- 2024: 24th
Home colours	Away colours

Club Atlético Lugano is an Argentine football club from Tapiales neighborhood in La Matanza Partido, Greater Buenos Aires. The team currently plays in Primera D, the regionalised 5th level of Argentine football league system.

The club was founded on 18 November 1915 by workers of French-owned railway company Compañía General de Ferrocarriles en la Provincia de Buenos Aires (then Ferrocarril General Manuel Belgrano). Its original name was "Club Compañía General Belgrano". The team earned its affiliation to Argentine Football Association in 1924 in order to compete in the intermediate category. in 1953 General Belgrano changed its name to "Club Atlético General Belgrano de Lugano".

In 1972, General Belgrano was affiliated to the Argentine Football Association and started playing in Primera D. In 1986, the name changed again to "Club Atlético Lugano", as a tribute to team's neighbourhood, Villa Lugano.

== Team 2019 ==
Note: Flags indicate national team as defined under FIFA eligibility rules; some limited exceptions apply. Players may hold more than one non-FIFA nationality.

No.	Pos.	Nation	Player
1	GK	(Argentina) ARG	Facundo Genero
11	FW	(Argentina) ARG	Matías Basualdo

== Titles ==
- Primera D (1): 1987–88
