= 2016 Primera B Metropolitana =

Primera B Metropolitana
- Dates: 5 Feb – 13 Jun 2016
- Champions: Flandria (1st. title)
- Promoted: Flandria
- Relegated: Deportivo Armenio
- Matches: 209
- Goals: 389 (1.86 per match)
- Top goalscorer: (Argentina) Javier Rossi (10)

The 2016 Argentine Primera B Metropolitana was the 117th. season of Primera B Metropolitana, the third division of the Argentine football league system. The season began on 5 Febrero and ended on 13 June 2016. Twenty teams competed in the league.

The championship had the addition of San Telmo and Talleres de Remedios de Escalada, which had promoted from the 2015 Primera C season.

Flandria won their first Primera B title, earning 37 points in 19 matches played and promoting to the upper division, Primera Nacional. On the other hand, Deportivo Armenio was relegated as the worst placed team.

== League table ==
Pos	Team	Pld	W	D	L	GF	GA	GD	Pts	Promotion or Qualification
1	Flandria	19	11	4	4	15	9	+6	37	Promotion to Primera B
2	Atlanta	19	10	5	4	28	17	+11	35	
3	Colegiales	19	9	5	5	26	17	+9	32	
4	Deportivo Morón	19	9	5	5	26	19	+7	32	
5	Fénix	19	9	5	5	21	14	+7	32	
6	Talleres	19	8	4	7	24	22	+2	28	
7	Tristán Suárez	19	8	3	8	24	27	−3	27	
8	Barracas Central	19	6	8	5	20	17	+3	26	
9	San Telmo	19	7	5	7	20	18	+2	26	
10	Comunicaciones	19	7	5	7	19	18	+1	26	
11	Defensores de Belgrano	19	5	8	6	16	16	0	23	
12	Villa San Carlos	19	5	8	6	22	24	−2	23	
13	UAI Urquiza	19	6	4	9	22	23	−1	22	
14	Platense	19	5	7	7	19	21	−2	22	
15	Almirante Brown	19	5	7	7	17	20	−3	22	
16	Deportivo Riestra	19	5	7	7	16	21	−5	22	
17	Deportivo Español	19	6	4	9	15	20	−5	22	
18	Acassuso	19	4	8	7	13	22	−9	20	
19	Estudiantes	19	3	9	7	14	22	−8	18	
20	Deportivo Armenio	19	3	7	9	12	22	−10	16	Relegation to Primera C

Updated to match(es) played on 13 June 2016. Source: Flashscore
Rules for classification: 1) points; 2) play-off (only for deciding promotion or relegation); 3) goal difference; 4) goals scored; 5) head-to-head points; 6) head-to-head goal difference; 7) head-to-head goals scored.

== See also ==
- 2016 Argentine Primera División
- 2016 Primera B Nacional
- 2016 Torneo Federal A
- 2015–16 Copa Argentina
