= Facundo (given name) =

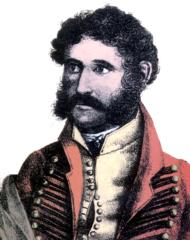
- Facundo Quiroga, Argentine caudillo
- Gender: Male
- Name day: November 27

Origin
- Meaning: Eloquent

Other names
- Usage: Europe and South America

Facundo is a male given name, from Latin "facundus", meaning "eloquent". Its diffusion is attributed to the baptismal name in Spain to the cult of San Facundo.

== Notable people ==
- Facundo Affranchino (born 1990), Argentine footballer
- Facundo Agüero (born 1995), Argentine footballer
- Facundo Aguirre (born 1985), Argentine alpine skier
- Facundo Albin (born 1992), Argentine speedway rider
- Facundo Almada (born 1998), Argentine footballer
- Facundo Altamirano (born 1996), Argentine footballer
- Facundo Andújar (born 1994), Argentine footballer
- Facundo Arana (born 1972), Argentine actor and musician
- Facundo Ardusso (born 1988), Argentine racing driver.
- Facundo Argüello (footballer) (born 1979), Argentine footballer
- Facundo Argüello (tennis) (born 1992), Argentine tennis player
- Facundo Arregui (born 1997), Argentine Paralympic swimmer
- Facundo Astudillo Castro (born 1997, disappeared 2020), Argentine citizen who went missing after being stopped by the police
- Facundo Bacardi (1813–1886), Spanish businessman
- Facundo Bagnis (born 1990), Argentine tennis player
- Facundo Barboza (born 1996), Argentine footballer
- Facundo Barceló (born 1993), Uruguayan footballer
- Facundo Batista (born 1999), Uruguayan footballer
- Facundo Bernal (born 2003), Uruguayan footballer
- Facundo Bertoglio (born 1990), Argentine footballer
- Facundo Boné (born 1995), Uruguayan footballer
- Facundo Bonifazi (born 1995), Uruguayan footballer
- Facundo Bosch (born 1991), Argentine rugby union player
- Facundo Britos (born 1996), Argentine footballer
- Facundo Bruera (born 1998), Argentine footballer
- Facundo Gómez Bruera (born 1978), known as Facundo (TV host), Mexican television host
- Facundo Bueso Sanllehí (1905–1960), Mexican-Puerto Rican physicist, educator, science communicator and athlete
- Facundo Buonanotte (born 2004), Argentine footballer
- Facundo Cabral (1937–2011), Argentine singer and songwriter
- Facundo Cabrera (born 1991), Uruguayan footballer
- Facundo Callejo (born 1992), Argentine footballer
- Facundo Callioni (born 1985), Argentine field hockey player
- Facundo Cambeses (born 1997), Argentine footballer
- Facundo Campazzo (born 1991), Argentine basketball player
- Facundo Cardozo (born 1995), Argentine footballer
- Facundo Carrillo (born 1997), Argentine footballer
- Facundo Cáseres (born 2001), Argentine footballer
- Facundo Castelli (born 1995), Argentine footballer
- Facundo Castet (born 1998), Argentine footballer
- Facundo Castillón (born 1986), Argentine footballer
- Facundo Castro (born 1996), Argentine footballer
- Facundo Castro (footballer, born 1995), Uruguayan footballer
- Facundo Chapur (born 1993), Argentine motor racing driver
- Facundo Cobos (born 1993), Argentine footballer
- Facundo Colidio (born 2000), Argentine footballer
- Facundo Cordero (born 1998), Argentine rugby union player
- Facundo Curuchet (born 1990), Argentine footballer
- Facundo Daffonchio, Argentine footballer
- Facundo Díaz Acosta (born 2000), Argentine professional tennis player
- Facundo Diz (born 1979), Argentine footballer and politician
- Facundo Echevarría (born 2002), Argentine footballer
- Facundo Erpen (born 1983), Argentine footballer
- Facundo Espíndola (1992–2018) was an Argentine footballer
- Facundo Espinosa (born 1980), Argentine actor and musician
- Facundo Farías (born 2002), Argentine footballer
- Facundo Ferrero (born 1995), Argentine footballer
- Facundo Ferreyra (born 1991), Argentine footballer
- Facundo Gambandé (born 1990), Argentine actor and singer
- Facundo Garcés (born 1999), Argentine footballer
- Facundo García (born 1999), Argentine footballer
- Facundo Gattas (born 1995), Uruguay rugby union player
- Facundo Gigena (born 1994), Argentine international rugby union player
- Facundo González (born 2003), Uruguayan footballer
- Facundo González Miranda (born 1953), Mexican politician
- Facundo Guichón (born 1991), Uruguayan footballer
- Facundo Gutiérrez (born 1997), Argentine footballer
- Facundo Imboden (born 1980), Argentine footballer
- Facundo Imhoff (born 1989), Argentine male volleyball player
- Facundo Isa (born 1993), Argentine professional rugby union player
- Facundo Juárez (born 1993), Argentine footballer
- Facundo Kidd (born 1997), Uruguayan footballer
- Facundo Kruspzky (born 2002), Argentine footballer
- Facundo Labandeira (born 1996), Uruguayan footballer
- Facundo Laumann (born 1990), Argentine footballer
- Facundo Leiva (born 1997), Argentine footballer
- Facundo Lescano (born 1996), Argentine footballer
- Facundo Lugones (born 1992), Argentine tennis coach
- Facundo Machado (born 2004), Uruguayan footballer
- Facundo Machaín (1845–1877), president of Paraguay
- Facundo Mallo (born 1995), Uruguayan footballer
- Facundo Manes (born 1969), Argentine neurologist and politician
- Facundo Mansilla (born 1999), Argentine footballer
- Facundo Martínez (born 1985), Argentine-Uruguayan footballer
- Facundo Mater (born 1998), Argentine footballer
- Facundo Medina (born 1999), Argentine footballer
- Facundo Melillán (born 1997), Argentine footballer
- Facundo Melivilo (born 1992), Argentine footballer
- Facundo Mena (born 1992), Argentine tennis player
- Facundo Milán (born 2001), Uruguayan footballer
- Facundo Monteseirín (born 1995), Argentine footballer
- Facundo Moreira (born 1989), Uruguayan footballer
- Facundo Moyano (born 1984), Argentine trade unionist and politician
- Facundo Mura (born 1999), Argentine footballer
- Facundo Nadalín (born 1997), Argentine footballer
- Facundo Nasif (born 1987), Argentine footballer
- Facundo Núñez (born 2006), Uruguayan footballer
- Facundo Oreja (born 1982), Argentine footballer
- Facundo Ospitaleche (born 1996), Uruguayan footballer
- Facundo Panceyra Garrido (born 1990), Argentine rugby union player
- Facundo Pansardi (born 1989), Argentine footballer
- Facundo Parada (born 2000), Uruguayan footballer
- Facundo Parra (born 1985), Argentine footballer
- Facundo Pastor (born 1979), Argentine radio host
- Facundo Pellistri (born 2001), Uruguayan footballer
- Facundo Peraza (born 1992), Uruguayan footballer
- Facundo Pereyra (born 1987), Argentine footballer
- Facundo Pérez (born 1999), Argentine footballer
- Facundo Pérez Castro (born 1981), Argentine footballer
- Facundo Pieres (born 1986), Argentine polo player
- Facundo Piñero (born 1988), Argentine basketball player
- Facundo Píriz (born 1990), Uruguayan footballer
- Facundo Placeres (born 1995), Uruguayan footballer
- Facundo Pons (born 1995), Argentine footballer
- Facundo Ponzio (born 1995), Argentine footballer
- Facundo Pumpido (born 1988), Argentine footballer
- Facundo Queiroz (born 1998), Uruguayan footballer
- Facundo Quignon (born 1993), Argentine footballer
- Facundo Quintana (born 1996), Argentine footballer
- Facundo Quiroga (1788-1835), Argentine caudillo
- Facundo Quiroga (footballer, born 1978), Argentina international football centre-back and right-back
- Facundo Quiroga (footballer, born 1985), Argentine football defender
- Facundo Rizzi (born 1997), Argentine footballer
- Facundo Rodríguez (footballer, born 1995), Uruguayan footballer
- Facundo Rodríguez (footballer, born 2000), Argentine footballer
- Facundo Roncaglia (born 1987), Argentine footballer
- Facundo Sánchez (born 1990), Argentine footballer
- Facundo Santucci (born 1987), Argentine male volleyball player
- Facundo Sava (born 1974), Argentine football manager and player
- Facundo Silva (footballer, born 1991), Argentine footballer for Instituto ACC
- Facundo Silva (footballer, born 1996), Uruguayan footballer for Danubio F.C.
- Facundo Silvera (footballer, born 1997), Uruguayan football defender
- Facundo Silvera (footballer, born 2001), Uruguayan football midfielder for Danubio
- Facundo Simioli (born 1988), Argentine footballer
- Facundo Soloa (born 1996), Argentine footballer
- Facundo Stable (born 1995), Argentine footballer
- Facundo Suárez (1923–1998), Argentine politician
- Facundo Taborda (born 1995), Argentine footballer
- Facundo Talín (born 1985), Argentine footballer
- Facundo Tallarico (born 1999), Argentine footballer
- Facundo Tello (born 1982), Argentine football referee
- Facundo Tobares (born 2000), Argentine footballer
- Facundo Torres (born 2000), Uruguayan footballer
- Facundo Trinidad (born 2002), Uruguayan footballer
- Facundo Vigo (born 1999), Uruguayan footballer
- Facundo Waller (born 1997), Uruguayan footballer
- Facundo Ynsfrán (1860–1902), Vice President of Paraguay from 1894 to 1898
- Facundo Zabala (born 1999), Argentine footballer
- Facundo Zamarián (born 1995), Argentine professional football coach and player

== See also ==
- Facundo, Chubut
- Yo maté a Facundo, 1975 film
