= Thiago Luna =

Argentine professional footballer

Tiago Luna
Personal information
- Full name: Tiago Luna Brizuela
- Date of birth: 9 February 1998 (age 28)
- Place of birth: Los Polvorines, Argentina
- Position: Midfielder

Team information
- Current team: Colegiales

Senior career*
Years	Team	Apps	(Gls)
2019–	Colegiales	2	(0)
- * Club domestic league appearances and goals as of 18:33, 8 May 2019 (UTC)

Thiago Luna Brizuela (born 9 February 1998) is an Argentine professional footballer who plays as a midfielder for Colegiales.

== Career ==
Luna's career started with Colegiales. He made his professional bow under manager Juan Carlos Kopriva in Primera B Metropolitana in April 2019, featuring for eleven minutes of a 0–1 win away to Justo José de Urquiza; another appearance arrived a month later against Atlanta, when he replaced Diego Chávez off the bench.

== Career statistics ==
As of 8 May 2019.

Appearances and goals by club, season and competition
Club	Season	League			Cup		League Cup		Continental		Other		Total	
Club	Season	Division	Apps	Goals	Apps	Goals	Apps	Goals	Apps	Goals	Apps	Goals	Apps	Goals
Colegiales	2018–19	Primera B Metropolitana	2	0	0	0	—		—		0	0	2	0
Career total			2	0	0	0	—		—		0	0	2	0
