= Poletto =

Poletto is a surname of Italian origin. Notable people with the surname include:

- Lucas Poletto (footballer, born 1994), Argentine football player
- Lucas Poletto (footballer, born 1995), Brazilian football player
- Severino Poletto (born 1933), Italian Catholic cardinal
