= Lucas Poletto =

Lucas Poletto may refer to:

- Lucas Poletto (footballer, born 1994), Argentine midfielder or forward
- Lucas Poletto (footballer, born 1995), Brazilian forward
