= Facundo Silvera =

Facundo Silvera may refer to:

- Facundo Silvera (footballer, born 1997), Uruguayan football defender
- Facundo Silvera (footballer, born 2001), Uruguayan football midfielder for Danubio
