= Diego Chávez =

Diego Chávez may refer to:

- Diego Chávez (footballer, born 1993), Peruvian right-back
- Diego Chávez (footballer, born 1995), Mexican midfielder
- Diego Chávez (footballer, born 1997), Argentine midfielder
