= Tallarico =

Tallarico is an Italian surname. Notable people with the surname include:

- Facundo Tallarico (born 1999), Argentine footballer
- Mia Tyler, born Mia Abagale Tallarico, American model and actress, daughter to Steven
- Santiago Tallarico (born 1997), Argentine footballer
- Steven Tyler, born Steven Victor Tallarico, American musician
- Tommy Tallarico (born 1968), American video game composer
- Tony Tallarico (1933–2022), American comic book artist

== See also ==
- Talarico, surname
