= Campagnaro =

Campagnaro is a surname. Notable people with the surname include:

- Hugo Campagnaro (born 1980), Argentine footballer
- Marco Campagnaro (born 2003), Argentine footballer
- Michele Campagnaro (born 1993), Italian rugby union player
- Simone Campagnaro (born 1986), Italian cyclist
- Tiago Campagnaro (born 1983), Brazilian footballer

== See also ==
- Campagnano (surname)
- Campagnano (disambiguation)
