= Moriceau =

Moriceau is a French surname. Notable people with the surname include:

- Jules Moriceau (1887–1977), French racing driver
- Norma Moriceau (1944–2016), Australian costume designer and production designer
- Tobías Moriceau (born 1997), Argentine footballer
