= Talarico =

Talarico is an Italian surname. Notable people with the surname include:

- Achille Talarico (1837−1902), Italian painter
- Fabio Talarico (born 1968), Argentinean footballer
- Gigia Talarico (born 1953), Bolivian writer
- Guy Talarico (born 1955), American politician
- James Talarico (born 1989), American politician
- Lita Talarico, American graphic designer
- Rich Talarico (born 1973), American television writer and producer
- Susette Talarico (1946–2007), American political scientist and legal scholar
- Vincenzo Talarico (1909–1972), Italian screenwriter and actor

== See also ==
- Tallarico, surname
