= Facundo Laumann =

Argentine footballer (born 1990)

Personal information
- Full name: Facundo Omar Laumann
- Date of birth: 14 March 1990 (age 36)
- Place of birth: Bahía Blanca, Argentina
- Height: 1.91 m (6 ft 3 in)
- Position: Centre-back

Team information
- Current team: Defensores Unidos

Youth career
- Olimpo

Senior career*
Years	Team	Apps	(Gls)
2008–2010	Olimpo	7	(0)
2010	Rosario Puerto Belgrano		
2011–2013	Olimpo	0	(0)
2012–2013	→ Tiro Federal (loan)		
2013–2014	Chacarita Juniors	21	(0)
2014–2016	Tiro Federal		
2016–2019	Defensores Unidos	103	(3)
2019–2021	Villa Mitre	40	(1)
2022–2023	Defensores Unidos	69	(8)
2024	Defensores de Belgrano	23	(0)
2025–	Defensores Unidos	14	(0)
- * Club domestic league appearances and goals as of 16:51, 30 July 2025 (UTC)

Facundo Omar Laumann (born 14 March 1990) is an Argentine professional footballer who plays as a centre-back for Defensores Unidos.

== Career ==
Olimpo were Laumann's first club. He moved into their senior squad ahead of the 2008–09 Primera B Nacional, featuring seven times in a season that they finished seventeenth. Laumann had a 2010 stint with Rosario Puerto Belgrano, though returned to Olimpo in 2011; no league appearances followed, though he did appear in the Copa Argentina versus Central Norte. After spending 2012–13 in Torneo Argentino B on loan with Tiro Federal, Laumann left Olimpo permanently to join Chacarita Juniors of Primera B Metropolitana in August 2013. He made his debut on 14 August in a one-nil loss versus Colegiales.

Laumann completed a return to Tiro Federal on 30 June 2014. They won promotion from Torneo Federal B to Torneo Federal A within his first five months back. One goal, versus Defensores de Belgrano, in thirty-seven third tier matches followed. July 2016 saw Primera C Metropolitana's Defensores Unidos sign Laumann. Two years on, the club were promoted to Primera B Metropolitana after the defender had scored twice in seventy-two appearances. His first goal came in a win away from home over Almirante Brown on 9 March 2019. July 2019 saw Villa Mitre sign Laumann.

== Career statistics ==
As of 19 July 2020.

Appearances and goals by club, season and competition
Club	Season	League			Cup		League Cup		Continental		Other		Total	
Club	Season	Division	Apps	Goals	Apps	Goals	Apps	Goals	Apps	Goals	Apps	Goals	Apps	Goals
Olimpo	2008–09	Primera B Nacional	7	0	0	0	—		—		0	0	7	0
Olimpo	2009–10	Primera B Nacional	0	0	0	0	—		—		0	0	0	0
Olimpo	2010–11	Primera División	0	0	0	0	—		—		0	0	0	0
Olimpo	2011–12	Primera División	0	0	1	0	—		—		0	0	1	0
Olimpo	2012–13	Primera B Nacional	0	0	0	0	—		—		0	0	0	0
Olimpo	Total		7	0	1	0	—		—		0	0	8	0
Chacarita Juniors	2013–14	Primera B Metropolitana	21	0	2	0	—		—		0	0	23	0
Tiro Federal	2015	Torneo Federal A	27	1	0	0	—		—		2 (Note: Appearance(s) in the Torneo Federal A play-offs)	0	29	1
Tiro Federal	2016	Torneo Federal A	8	0	0	0	—		—		0	0	8	0
Tiro Federal	Total		35	1	0	0	—		—		2	0	37	1
Defensores Unidos	2018–19	Primera B Metropolitana	31	1	2	0	—		—		0	0	33	1
Villa Mitre	2019–20	Torneo Federal A	21	0	3	0	—		—		0	0	24	0
Career total			115	2	8	0	—		—		2	0	125	2

== Honours ==
Defensores Unidos

- Primera C Metropolitana: 2017–18
