= Faggioli =

Faggioli is an Italian surname. Notable people with the surname include:

- Alessandro Faggioli (born 2000), Italian footballer
- Lucas Faggioli (born 1997), Argentine footballer
- Massimo Faggioli (born 1970), Italian church historian
- Michelangelo Faggioli (1666–1733), Italian lawyer and composer

== See also ==
- Fagioli, similar surname
