= Juan Tolosa =

Argentine professional footballer

Personal information
- Full name: Juan Manuel Tolosa
- Date of birth: 22 September 1994 (age 32)
- Place of birth: Argentina
- Position: Forward

Team information
- Current team: Villa Belgrano

Youth career
- Rivadavia

Senior career*
Years	Team	Apps	(Gls)
2013–2015	Rivadavia	79	(27)
2016–2017	Atlanta	26	(1)
2017–2018	Rivadavia	21	(0)
2018–2019	Colegiales	19	(0)
2019–20221	Atlético Camioneros	12	(0)
2021–	Villa Belgrano		
- * Club domestic league appearances and goals as of 18:06, 4 September 2022 (UTC)

Juan Manuel Tolosa (born 22 September 1994) is an Argentine professional footballer who plays as a forward for Villa Belgrano.

== Career ==
Tolosa's senior career began with Rivadavia in Torneo Argentino A. He got goals in both of his first two appearances in April 2013, netting on debut versus Defensores de Belgrano before netting a goal against Guillermo Brown. Eight appearances arrived in 2012–13, which was followed by thirty-two appearances in 2013–14; as he scored a further six goals, including braces over Cipolletti and Deportivo Maipú. The club were relegated to Torneo Federal B in 2013–14, as he subsequently appeared forty-six times and notched nineteen goals. In early 2016, Tolosa signed for Primera B Metropolitana's Atlanta. Twenty-seven games and one goal came.

July 2017 saw Tolosa return to Rivadavia, with the club back in the third tier; though they would suffer relegation again at the conclusion of 2017–18. Tolosa departed on 22 July 2018, agreeing terms with Colegiales. His bow occurred in the succeeding September versus Estudiantes. Twelve months later, Tolosa was on the move again as he joined Atlético Camioneros of Torneo Federal A.

== Career statistics ==
As of 23 September 2020.

Appearances and goals by club, season and competition
Club	Season	League			Cup		League Cup		Continental		Other		Total	
Club	Season	Division	Apps	Goals	Apps	Goals	Apps	Goals	Apps	Goals	Apps	Goals	Apps	Goals
Rivadavia	2012–13	Torneo Argentino A	3	2	0	0	—		—		5 (Note: Appearance(s) in the Torneo Argentino A play-offs)	0	8	2
Rivadavia	2013–14	Torneo Argentino A	30	6	2	0	—		—		0	0	32	6
Rivadavia	Total		33	8	2	0	—		—		5	0	40	8
Atlanta	2016	Primera B Metropolitana	13	1	0	0	—		—		1 (Note: Appearance(s) in the Primera B Metropolitana play-offs)	0	14	1
Atlanta	2016–17	Primera B Metropolitana	12	0	0	0	—		—		0	0	13	0
Atlanta	Total		26	1	0	0	—		—		1	0	27	1
Rivadavia	2017–18	Torneo Federal A	21	0	2	0	—		—		0	0	23	0
Colegiales	2018–19	Primera B Metropolitana	19	0	0	0	—		—		0	0	19	0
Atlético Camioneros	2019–20	Torneo Federal A	5	0	0	0	—		—		0	0	5	0
Career total			104	9	4	0	—		—		6	0	114	9
