= Diego Magallanes =

Argentine professional footballer

Personal information
- Date of birth: 31 March 1997 (age 29)
- Place of birth: Pilar, Argentina
- Height: 1.78 m (5 ft 10 in)
- Position: Right-back

Team information
- Current team: Defensores de Belgrano

Youth career
- Colegiales

Senior career*
Years	Team	Apps	(Gls)
2018–2025	Colegiales	145	(6)
2022	→ Gimnasia Jujuy (loan)	14	(0)
2023	→ Deportivo Riestra (loan)	17	(0)
2025–2026	Temperley	14	(0)
2026–	Defensores de Belgrano	9	(0)
- * Club domestic league appearances and goals as of 17:40, 25 April 2026 (UTC)

Diego Magallanes (born 31 March 1997) is an Argentine professional footballer who plays as a right-back for Defensores de Belgrano.

== Career ==
Magallanes made the breakthrough into first-team football with Colegiales, as he began featuring in Primera B Metropolitana after coming through their youth ranks. His professional debut arrived on 14 October 2018 against Defensores Unidos, as he made six appearances in the first half of the 2018–19 season under managers Leonardo Estévez and Juan Carlos Kopriva. In June 2022, Magallanes joined Primera Nacional club Gimnasia Jujuy on a loan deal until the end of 2023, with a purchase option.

== Career statistics ==
As of 7 May 2019.

Appearances and goals by club, season and competition
Club	Season	League			Cup		League Cup		Continental		Other		Total	
Club	Season	Division	Apps	Goals	Apps	Goals	Apps	Goals	Apps	Goals	Apps	Goals	Apps	Goals
Colegiales	2018–19	Primera B Metropolitana	21	0	0	0	—		—		0	0	21	0
Career total			21	0	0	0	—		—		0	0	21	0
