= Facundo Andújar =

Argentine professional footballer

Personal information
- Full name: Facundo Alfonso Andújar
- Date of birth: 4 July 1994 (age 32)
- Place of birth: Villa Lugano, Argentina
- Height: 1.91 m (6 ft 3 in)
- Position: Goalkeeper

Team information
- Current team: Almirante Brown

Youth career
- Huracán
- 2014–2015: Estudiantes

Senior career*
Years	Team	Apps	(Gls)
2015–2017	Estudiantes	0	(0)
2017–2019	Deportivo Español	24	(0)
2019–	Almirante Brown	5	(0)
- * Club domestic league appearances and goals as of 00:48, 18 July 2020 (UTC)

Facundo Alfonso Andújar (born 4 July 1994) is an Argentine professional footballer who plays as a goalkeeper for Almirante Brown.

== Career ==
Andújar's career began with Huracán's academy, prior to the goalkeeper securing a move to Estudiantes in 2014. He was on the first-team's radar for two years from 2015 but didn't make a competitive appearance for the Primera División team. On 9 August 2017, Andújar joined Deportivo Español of Primera B Metropolitana. His senior bow arrived on 7 April 2018 in a goalless draw in the league against Acassuso, which was the first of five matches he participated in during the 2017–18 season. In July 2019, Andújar signed with Almirante Brown.

== Personal life ==
Andújar is the brother of Argentina international goalkeeper Mariano Andújar, who was also on the books of Estudiantes.

== Career statistics ==
As of 18 July 2020.

Appearances and goals by club, season and competition
Club	Season	League			Cup		League Cup		Continental		Other		Total	
Club	Season	Division	Apps	Goals	Apps	Goals	Apps	Goals	Apps	Goals	Apps	Goals	Apps	Goals
Estudiantes	2015	Primera División	0	0	0	0	—		0	0	0	0	0	0
Estudiantes	2016	Primera División	0	0	0	0	—		—		0	0	0	0
Estudiantes	2016–17	Primera División	0	0	0	0	—		0	0	0	0	0	0
Estudiantes	Total		0	0	0	0	—		0	0	0	0	0	0
Deportivo Español	2017–18	Primera B Metropolitana	5	0	0	0	—		—		0	0	5	0
Deportivo Español	2018–19	Primera B Metropolitana	19	0	0	0	—		—		0	0	19	0
Deportivo Español	Total		24	0	0	0	—		—		0	0	24	0
Almirante Brown	2017–18	Primera B Metropolitana	5	0	0	0	—		—		0	0	5	0
Career total			29	0	0	0	—		0	0	0	0	29	0
