= Mariano Andújar =

Argentine footballer (born 1983)

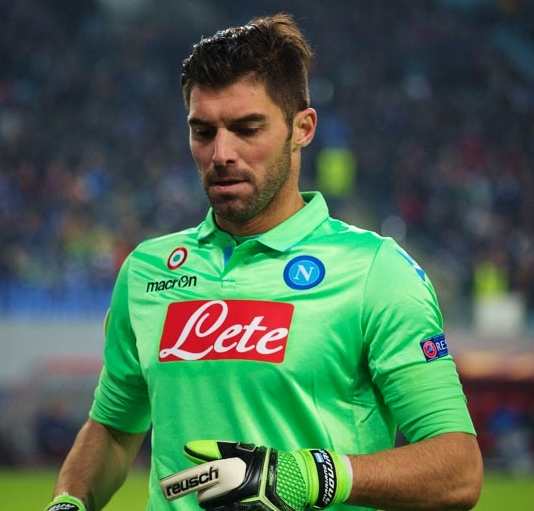
- Andújar playing for Napoli in 2015

Personal information
- Full name: Mariano Andújar
- Date of birth: 30 July 1983 (age 43)
- Place of birth: Buenos Aires, Argentina
- Height: 1.94 m (6 ft 4 in)
- Position: Goalkeeper

Senior career*
Years	Team	Apps	(Gls)
2001–2006	Huracán	60	(0)
2005–2006	→ Palermo (loan)	11	(0)
2006–2009	Estudiantes	105	(0)
2009–2014	Catania	135	(0)
2012	→ Estudiantes (loan)	18	(0)
2014–2016	Napoli	12	(0)
2014	→ Catania (loan)	11	(0)
2016	→ Estudiantes (loan)	12	(0)
2016–2023	Estudiantes	153	(0)
Total		517	(0)

International career
2009–2014	Argentina	11	(0)
Medal record
Argentina
FIFA World Cup
Runner-up	2014 Brazil	Team
- * Club domestic league appearances and goals

Mariano Andújar (born 30 July 1983) is an Argentine former professional footballer who played as a goalkeeper.

== Club career ==
In 2009, Andújar was the first team goalkeeper in Estudiantes' Copa Libertadores winning team. Andújar did not concede a single goal in any of the eight games in La Plata and he set a new tournament record of 800 minutes without conceding a goal, beating Hugo Gatti's 767 minutes.

On 24 June 2009, Italian club Catania officially announced that the club had signed the player to a four-year deal.

On 24 January 2014, Napoli's official website posted that Andújar was in Naples completing a medical in preparation for his move to the Italian club. Four days later, a co-ownership deal was reached, with Andújar being loaned back to Catania for the remainder of the season. He will join Napoli at the start of the 2014–15 campaign. He made his debut in Naples on 11 December 2014, in a match against Slovan Bratislava (winning 3–0), in the 2014–15 UEFA Europa League, in the last match of the group stage.

During the midway point of the 2014–15 season, Andújar secured his place in Napoli's starting lineup, thanks to good performances and the decline of Napoli first-choice keeper Rafael. On 24 April 2015, Andújar led Napoli to the Europa League semi-finals with a solid performance against VfL Wolfsburg. Napoli advanced from the tie with a 6–3 aggregate.

On 9 March 2022, Estudiantes overcame Everton of Chile in the third round of the Copa Libertadores 2022, at the Sausalito Stadium, and reached 41 Copa Libertadores matches with Estudiantes' jersey. Thus, he reached the club's all-time podium in such competition, surpassing Juan Sebastián Verón's record.

On Sunday, 20 March 2022, after Estudiantes' draw against Gimnasia at the Juan Carmelo Zerillo Stadium, for the Professional League Cup, Mariano Andújar became the fifth player with the highest number of appearances in the club's history, with 363 official matches played, and the first in the goalkeeper position.

In October 2023, Andujar announced that he would retire at the end of the year. On 14 December 2023, Andujar played his last game at Estudiantes against Defensa y Justica in the Copa Argentina final and Estudiantes won the Copa Argentina, beating Defensa y Justica 1–0. On 19 December five days after the match, Andujar announced his retirement from football.

== International career ==
Andújar made his debut for the Argentina national team in a 2010 FIFA World Cup qualifier against Colombia on 6 June 2009.

During the 2010 FIFA World Cup and 2011 Copa América, Andújar served as understudy to Sergio Romero, the first choice goalkeeper for the Albiceleste.

In June 2014, Andújar was named in Argentina's squad for the 2014 FIFA World Cup.

== Personal life ==
Facundo Andújar is Mariano's brother, he is also a professional footballer.

== Honours ==
Estudiantes

- Argentine Primera División: 2006 Apertura
- Copa Argentina: 2023
- Copa Libertadores: 2009

Napoli

- Supercoppa Italiana: 2014

Argentina

- FIFA World Cup runner-up: 2014
- Copa América runner-up: 2016
