= Franco Toloza =

Argentine professional footballer

Personal information
- Full name: Franco Adrián Toloza
- Date of birth: 9 May 1994 (age 32)
- Place of birth: Buenos Aires, Argentina
- Height: 1.80 m (5 ft 11 in)
- Position: Forward

Team information
- Current team: Deportivo Morón

Senior career*
Years	Team	Apps	(Gls)
2013–2018	Tristán Suárez	19	(0)
2014	→ Argentino (loan)	7	(1)
2017–2018	→ Germinal (loan)	9	(4)
2018–2022	Colegiales	45	(17)
2019–2021	→ Ferro Carril Oeste (loan)	36	(9)
2022	→ Temperley (loan)	29	(5)
2022–2023	Águila	14	(1)
2023–2025	All Boys	48	(15)
2025–2026	San Martín SJ	16	(1)
2026–	Deportivo Morón	6	(3)
- * Club domestic league appearances and goals as of 17:44, 27 April 2026 (UTC)

Franco Adrián Toloza (born 9 May 1994) is an Argentine professional footballer who plays as a forward for Deportivo Morón.

== Career ==
Tristán Suárez were Toloza's first senior team. He made his senior debut on 11 May 2013 in a Primera B Metropolitana fixture with Deportivo Morón, which was followed by another appearance versus Acassuso later that month. After just one cameo league appearance in the subsequent 2013–14, Toloza left after he was loaned in June 2014 to Primera C Metropolitana's Argentino. One goal in seven fixtures followed. He returned to Tristán Suárez in 2015, going on to participate sixteen times in the next three seasons. Having spent 2017–18 on loan with Germinal, where he scored four in nine, Toloza signed for Colegiales on 9 July 2018.

In November 2019, after eighteen goals for Colegiales, Toloza joined Primera B Nacional side Ferro Carril Oeste on loan for one year; as an injury replacement for Lucas Pugh. Toloza left Ferro at the end of 2021 and in January 2022, he went on a new loan spell, this time at Temperley for one year.

== Career statistics ==
As of 29 August 2020.

Appearances and goals by club, season and competition
Club	Season	League			Cup		League Cup		Continental		Other		Total	
Club	Season	Division	Apps	Goals	Apps	Goals	Apps	Goals	Apps	Goals	Apps	Goals	Apps	Goals
Tristán Suárez	2012–13	Primera B Metropolitana	2	0	0	0	—		—		0	0	2	0
Tristán Suárez	2013–14	Primera B Metropolitana	1	0	1	0	—		—		0	0	2	0
Tristán Suárez	2014	Primera B Metropolitana	0	0	0	0	—		—		0	0	0	0
Tristán Suárez	2015	Primera B Metropolitana	3	0	0	0	—		—		0	0	3	0
Tristán Suárez	2016	Primera B Metropolitana	2	0	0	0	—		—		0	0	2	0
Tristán Suárez	2016–17	Primera B Metropolitana	11	0	0	0	—		—		0	0	11	0
Tristán Suárez	2017–18	Primera B Metropolitana	0	0	0	0	—		—		0	0	0	0
Tristán Suárez	Total		19	0	1	0	—		—		0	0	20	0
Argentino (loan)	2014	Primera C Metropolitana	7	1	0	0	—		—		0	0	7	1
Germinal (loan)	2017–18	Torneo Federal B	9	4	0	0	—		—		0	0	9	4
Colegiales	2018–19	Primera B Metropolitana	32	11	0	0	—		—		2 (Note: Appearance(s) in the Primera B Metropolitana play-offs)	1	34	12
Colegiales	2019–20	Primera B Metropolitana	13	6	0	0	—		—		0	0	13	6
Colegiales	Total		45	17	0	0	—		—		2	1	47	18
Ferro Carril Oeste (loan)	2019–20	Primera B Nacional	8	4	0	0	—		—		0	0	8	4
Career total			88	26	1	0	—		—		2	1	91	27
