= Campagnano (surname) =

Campagnano is a surname. Notable people with the surname include:

- Marcella Campagnano (born 1941), contemporary artist and Italian feminist photographer
- Vasco Campagnano (1910–1976), Italian operatic tenor

== See also ==
- Campagnano (disambiguation)
- Campagnaro
