= Facundo Melillán =

Argentine professional footballer

Personal information
- Date of birth: 23 April 1997 (age 29)
- Place of birth: Neuquén, Argentina
- Height: 1.83 m (6 ft 0 in)
- Position: Left-back

Team information
- Current team: Mitre

Youth career
- All Boys

Senior career*
Years	Team	Apps	(Gls)
2018–2020	All Boys	25	(0)
2020–2022	Colegiales	32	(0)
2023–	Mitre	45	(0)
- * Club domestic league appearances and goals as of 17:47, 14 August 2025 (UTC)

Facundo Melillán (born 23 April 1997) is an Argentine professional footballer who plays as a left-back for Mitre.

== Career ==
All Boys gave Melillán his start in senior football. The club were relegated from Primera B Nacional in 2017–18, the defender didn't appear competitively but did make the substitutes bench on two occasions. Melillán's professional bow arrived on 24 August 2018 during a 1–2 victory against Fénix in Primera B Metropolitana, coming on for the final minutes in place of Rodrigo Díaz. He was selected to start for the first time in the succeeding September versus Defensores Unidos.

== Career statistics ==
As of 12 April 2019.

Appearances and goals by club, season and competition
Club	Season	League			Cup		Continental		Other		Total	
Club	Season	Division	Apps	Goals	Apps	Goals	Apps	Goals	Apps	Goals	Apps	Goals
All Boys	2017–18	Primera B Nacional	0	0	0	0	—		0	0	0	0
All Boys	2018–19	Primera B Metropolitana	16	0	1	0	—		0	0	17	0
Career total			16	0	1	0	—		0	0	17	0
