= Fagioli =

Fagioli is an Italian surname literally meaning "beans". Notable people with the surname include:

- Alice Fagioli (born 1980), Italian sprint canoeist
- Federico Fagioli (born 1991), Argentine politician
- Franco Fagioli (born 1981), Argentine countertenor
- Luigi Fagioli (1898–1952), Italian motor racer
- Nicolò Fagioli (born 2001), Italian footballer

== See also ==
- Pasta e fagioli
- 27959 Fagioli, a main-belt asteroid
- Faggioli, similar surname
