= Facundo Nasif =

Argentine professional footballer

Personal information
- Full name: Facundo David Nasif
- Date of birth: 10 September 1987 (age 39)
- Place of birth: Mar del Plata, Argentina
- Height: 1.89 m (6 ft 2 in)
- Position: Defender

Team information
- Current team: Potenza Picena

Youth career
- Quilmes

Senior career*
Years	Team	Apps	(Gls)
2008–2014	Aldosivi	76	(7)
2014	San Jorge	11	(2)
2015	Sportivo Belgrano	3	(0)
2015	Técnico Universitario	20	(2)
2016	Los Andes	4	(0)
2016	Comunicaciones	3	(0)
2017	Manta	6	(1)
2017	Luftëtari Gjirokastër	1	(0)
2018	Almirante Brown	12	(1)
2018–2020	Colegiales	34	(4)
2021	Círculo Deportivo	9	(0)
2021	Torrenovese		
2021	Virtus Matino	7	(0)
2022	Valdichienti Ponte		
2022	Civitanovese		
2022–2023	Porto Sant'Elpidio		
2023–	Potenza Picena		
- * Club domestic league appearances and goals as of 19:44, 2 May 2024 (UTC)

Facundo David Nasif (born 10 September 1987) is an Argentine professional footballer who plays as a defender for Italian Promozione side Potenza Picena.

== Career ==
Nasif began with Aldosivi, signing from Quilmes' youth. He made ten appearances in the 2008–09 Primera B Nacional, notably for his professional debut in a victory away to Talleres on 9 August 2008. His first goal arrived in September 2009 versus San Martín, which was one of seven across six seasons with the club. Nasif departed Aldosivi on 30 June 2014 to join San Jorge, with a move to Sportivo Belgrano coming seven months later. In July 2015, Nasif switched Argentina for Ecuador after agreeing terms with Técnico Universitario. He scored against L.D.U. Portoviejo and Delfín across twenty Serie B games.

2016 saw Nasif return to his homeland with Primera B Nacional's Los Andes. He was sent off during his second match versus All Boys on 10 April. In the succeeding August, Nasif joined Comunicaciones in Primera B Metropolitana. Three appearances followed, which preceded his departure on 10 January 2017 to Manta; returning to Ecuador's second tier. He netted against Olmedo during his time with the Manabí outfit. Nasif moved to Europe in August 2017, signing for Albanian Superliga side Luftëtari Gjirokastër. He appeared in just one league game, but did play twice and score once, vs. Elbasani, in the cup.

After spending eight months with Almirante Brown, Nasif went across Primera B Metropolitana to Colegiales on 12 July 2018. He was released in June 2020.

In August 2021, Nasif moved to Italy, signing with Eccellenza side Torrenovese. In November 2021, he moved to Serie D side Virtus Matino. Just before the new year 2022, Nasif switched to Valdichienti Ponte. Six months later, he joined Civitanovese Calcio.

In December 2022, Nasif joined Porto Sant'Elpidio.

== Career statistics ==
As of 19 August 2020.

Appearances and goals by club, season and competition
Club	Season	League			Cup		League Cup		Continental		Other		Total	
Club	Season	Division	Apps	Goals	Apps	Goals	Apps	Goals	Apps	Goals	Apps	Goals	Apps	Goals
Aldosivi	2008–09	Primera B Nacional	10	0	0	0	—		—		0	0	10	0
Aldosivi	2009–10	Primera B Nacional	32	3	0	0	—		—		0	0	32	3
Aldosivi	2010–11	Primera B Nacional	14	2	0	0	—		—		0	0	14	2
Aldosivi	2011–12	Primera B Nacional	5	0	2	0	—		—		0	0	7	0
Aldosivi	2012–13	Primera B Nacional	5	2	0	0	—		—		0	0	5	2
Aldosivi	2013–14	Primera B Nacional	10	0	1	0	—		—		0	0	11	0
Aldosivi	Total		76	7	3	0	—		—		0	0	79	7
San Jorge	2014	Torneo Federal A	11	2	0	0	—		—		0	0	11	2
Sportivo Belgrano	2015	Primera B Nacional	3	0	1	0	—		—		0	0	4	0
Técnico Universitario	2015	Serie B	20	2	—		—		—		0	0	20	2
Los Andes	2016	Primera B Nacional	4	0	0	0	—		—		0	0	4	0
Comunicaciones	2016–17	Primera B Metropolitana	3	0	0	0	—		—		0	0	3	0
Manta	2017	Serie B	6	1	—		—		—		0	0	6	1
Luftëtari Gjirokastër	2017–18	Superliga	1	0	2	1	—		—		0	0	3	1
Almirante Brown	2017–18	Primera B Metropolitana	12	1	0	0	—		—		0	0	12	1
Colegiales	2018–19	Primera B Metropolitana	36	4	0	0	—		—		1	0	37	4
Colegiales	2019–20	Primera B Metropolitana	21	0	0	0	—		—		0	0	21	0
Colegiales	Total		57	4	0	0	—		—		1	0	58	4
Career total			193	17	6	1	—		—		1	0	200	18
