= Luciano Arnijas =

Argentine footballer

Personal information
- Full name: Luciano Gastón Arnijas
- Date of birth: 20 March 2003 (age 23)
- Place of birth: Coronel Moldes, Córdoba, Argentina
- Height: 1.91 m (6 ft 3 in)
- Position: Centre-back

Team information
- Current team: Deportivo Maipú (on loan from Unión La Calera)

Youth career
- Talleres

Senior career*
Years	Team	Apps	(Gls)
2023	Talleres	0	(0)
2024–	Unión La Calera	1	(0)
2025–	→ Deportivo Maipú (loan)	34	(0)
- * Club domestic league appearances and goals as of 17:16, 27 April 2026 (UTC)

Luciano Gastón Arnijas (born 20 March 2003) is an Argentine footballer who plays as a centre-back for Deportivo Maipú, on loan from Unión La Calera.

== Club career ==
Born in Coronel Moldes, Córdoba, Argentina, Arnijas was trained at Talleres de Córdoba. A regular player for the reserve team, he was a member of the first team in 2023.

In February 2024, Arnijas moved abroad and joined Unión La Calera in the Chilean Primera División as a free agent. He made his debut in the 3–0 win against Cobresal on 11 November of the same year.

In January 2025, Arnijas returned to Argentina and signed with Deportivo Maipú on a deal for two years.
