= Gastón Mansilla =

Argentine footballer

Personal information
- Full name: Gastón Ezequiel Mansilla
- Date of birth: 30 May 1997 (age 29)
- Place of birth: San Martín, Argentina
- Position: Midfielder

Team information
- Current team: Deportivo Maipú

Youth career
- River Plate
- 2017–2018: Independiente

Senior career*
| Years | Team | Apps | (Gls) |
| 2018–2021 | Colegiales | 24 | (2) |
| 2021–2022 | Arsenal Sarandí | 2 | (0) |
| 2022–2023 | Flandria | 28 | (1) |
| 2023–2024 | Colegiales | 28 | (0) |
| 2024– | Deportivo Maipú | 60 | (3) |
- * Club domestic league appearances and goals as of 17:19, 27 April 2026 (UTC)

Gastón Ezequiel Mansilla (born 30 May 1997) is an Argentine professional footballer who plays as a midfielder for Deportivo Maipú.

== Career ==
Mansilla played for the Barracas Central academy up until 2017, when the midfielder joined Independiente's youth ranks. In 2018, Mansilla moved to Primera B Metropolitana's Colegiales. He made his professional debut on 21 August versus Acassuso, before scoring his first goal three appearances later against San Miguel in October.

After a spell at Arsenal Sarandí in 2021, Mansilla moved to Flandria in January 2022.

== Career statistics ==
As of 8 May 2019.

Appearances and goals by club, season and competition
| Club | Season | League | | | Cup | | League Cup | | Continental | | Other | | Total | |
| Club | Season | Division | Apps | Goals | Apps | Goals | Apps | Goals | Apps | Goals | Apps | Goals | Apps | Goals |
|---|---|---|---|---|---|---|---|---|---|---|---|---|---|---|
| Colegiales | 2018–19 | Primera B Metropolitana | 24 | 2 | 0 | 0 | — | | — | | 0 | 0 | 24 | 2 |
| Career total | | | 24 | 2 | 0 | 0 | — | | — | | 0 | 0 | 24 | 2 |
