= Franco Gómez =

Argentine professional footballer

Personal information
- Full name: Franco Ezequiel Gómez
- Date of birth: 8 May 1994 (age 32)
- Place of birth: Argentina
- Position: Midfielder

Team information
- Current team: Colegiales

Senior career*
Years	Team	Apps	(Gls)
2016–2018	Atlas	46	(1)
2018–	Colegiales	18	(0)
- * Club domestic league appearances and goals as of 16:26, 8 May 2019 (UTC)

Franco Ezequiel Gómez (born 8 May 1994) is an Argentine professional footballer who plays as a midfielder for Colegiales.

== Career ==
Gómez played for Primera D Metropolitana side Atlas for two years from 2016, scoring one goal in forty-six appearances for the club. On 30 June 2018, Gómez completed a move to Colegiales of Primera B Metropolitana. He didn't start appearing for their senior team until mid-November, with the midfielder making his debut during a 1–1 draw with Tristán Suárez on 17 November. Further appearances against Talleres and Atlanta arrived later that month.

== Career statistics ==
As of 8 May 2019.

Appearances and goals by club, season and competition
Club	Season	League			Cup		League Cup		Continental		Other		Total	
Club	Season	Division	Apps	Goals	Apps	Goals	Apps	Goals	Apps	Goals	Apps	Goals	Apps	Goals
Colegiales	2018–19	Primera B Metropolitana	18	0	0	0	—		—		0	0	18	0
Career total			18	0	0	0	—		—		0	0	18	0
