= Brian Medina =

Argentine professional footballer

Personal information
- Full name: Brian Daniel Medina
- Date of birth: 17 April 1993 (age 33)
- Place of birth: Temperley, Argentina
- Height: 1.78 m (5 ft 10 in)
- Position: Centre-back

Team information
- Current team: Almirante Brown

Youth career
- San Lorenzo

Senior career*
Years	Team	Apps	(Gls)
2014–2015	San Lorenzo	0	(0)
2014–2015	→ Bragado (loan)	33	(1)
2016–2019	Colegiales	108	(0)
2020–2021	Ituzaingó		
2021	Deportivo Armenio	14	(0)
2022–	Almirante Brown	0	(0)
- * Club domestic league appearances and goals as of 19:28, 8 June 2022 (UTC)

Brian Daniel Medina (born 17 April 1993) is an Argentine professional footballer who plays as a centre-back for Almirante Brown.

== Career ==
Medina came through the youth system of San Lorenzo. Bragado signed Medina on loan in 2014. One goal in thirty-three matches followed in Torneo Federal B across the 2014 and 2015 seasons. In 2016, Medina completed a move to Primera B Metropolitana's Colegiales. He made his debut on 6 February 2016 against Villa San Carlos, which was the first of sixteen appearances in 2016. A further forty-one matches followed in two campaigns. Medina surpassed 100 league appearances for Colegiales in 2019–20, though would depart the club midway through in order to sign with Ituzaingó in Primera C Metropolitana.

After a spell at Deportivo Armenio in 2021, Medina moved to Primera Nacional club Club Almirante Brown in January 2022.

== Career statistics ==
As of 4 July 2020.

Appearances and goals by club, season and competition
Club	Season	League			Cup		League Cup		Continental		Other		Total	
Club	Season	Division	Apps	Goals	Apps	Goals	Apps	Goals	Apps	Goals	Apps	Goals	Apps	Goals
San Lorenzo	2014	Primera División	0	0	0	0	—		—		0	0	0	0
San Lorenzo	2015	Primera División	0	0	0	0	—		—		0	0	0	0
San Lorenzo	Total		0	0	0	0	—		—		0	0	0	0
Colegiales	2016	Primera B Metropolitana	16	0	0	0	—		—		0	0	16	0
Colegiales	2016–17	Primera B Metropolitana	23	0	0	0	—		—		0	0	23	0
Colegiales	2017–18	Primera B Metropolitana	18	0	0	0	—		—		0	0	18	0
Colegiales	2018–19	Primera B Metropolitana	37	0	0	0	—		—		2 (Note: Appearance(s) in the Primera B Metropolitana play-offs)	0	39	0
Colegiales	2019–20	Primera B Metropolitana	14	0	0	0	—		—		0	0	14	0
Colegiales	Total		108	0	0	0	—		—		2	0	110	0
Career total			108	0	0	0	—		—		2	0	110	0
