= Nicolás Angellotti =

Argentine footballer (born 1990)

Personal information
- Full name: Nicolás Roberto Angellotti
- Date of birth: 1 April 1990 (age 36)
- Place of birth: Buenos Aires, Argentina
- Height: 1.87 m (6 ft 2 in)
- Position: Goalkeeper

Team information
- Current team: Colegiales

Youth career
- 2001–2003: Independiente Rivadavia
- 2003–2007: Godoy Cruz
- 2007–2011: Platense

Senior career*
| Years | Team | Apps | (Gls) |
| 2011–2014 | Platense | 14 | (0) |
| 2014–2015 | Acassuso | 4 | (0) |
| 2016–2017 | Deportivo Morón | 2 | (0) |
| 2017 | Alianza Petrolera | 0 | (0) |
| 2017–2018 | Defensores de Belgrano | 2 | (0) |
| 2018– | Colegiales | 0 | (0) |
- * Club domestic league appearances and goals as of 11:17, 5 May 2019 (UTC)

Nicolás Roberto Angellotti (born 1 April 1990) is an Argentine professional footballer who plays as a goalkeeper for Colegiales.

== Career ==
Angellotti started in Independiente Rivadavia's youth from 2001, which preceded stints with Godoy Cruz and Platense. He was part of Platense's first-team from 2011, though didn't make a league appearance until mid-2012 as he made his bow in a defeat to Villa Dálmine on 5 August; more appearances came later that month versus Chacarita Juniors and Brown. On 30 June 2014, Angellotti joined fellow Primera B Metropolitana side Acassuso. Eight matches followed in two campaigns. He spent 2016 and 2016–17 with Deportivo Morón, in the latter he won promotion to Primera B Nacional after appearing five times in total.

Angellotti signed for Categoría Primera A team Alianza Petrolera on 6 July 2017. However, he terminated his contract on 26 July. After returning from Colombia, Angellotti agreed terms with Defensores de Belgrano of Primera B Metropolitana on 30 July. His first appearances arrived in the succeeding April against Tristán Suárez and Talleres, in a campaign which concluded with promotion. A move to Colegiales was completed on 11 July 2018.

== Career statistics ==
As of 5 May 2019.

Appearances and goals by club, season and competition
| Club | Season | League | | | Cup | | League Cup | | Continental | | Other | | Total | |
| Club | Season | Division | Apps | Goals | Apps | Goals | Apps | Goals | Apps | Goals | Apps | Goals | Apps | Goals |
|---|---|---|---|---|---|---|---|---|---|---|---|---|---|---|
| Platense | 2012–13 | Primera B Metropolitana | 3 | 0 | 1 | 0 | — | | — | | 0 | 0 | 4 | 0 |
| Acassuso | 2014 | Primera B Metropolitana | 0 | 0 | 0 | 0 | — | | — | | 0 | 0 | 0 | 0 |
| Acassuso | 2015 | Primera B Metropolitana | 4 | 0 | 4 | 0 | — | | — | | 0 | 0 | 8 | 0 |
| Acassuso | Total | | 4 | 0 | 4 | 0 | — | | — | | 0 | 0 | 8 | 0 |
| Deportivo Morón | 2016 | Primera B Metropolitana | 0 | 0 | 1 | 0 | — | | — | | 0 | 0 | 1 | 0 |
| Deportivo Morón | 2016–17 | Primera B Metropolitana | 2 | 0 | 3 | 0 | — | | — | | 0 | 0 | 5 | 0 |
| Deportivo Morón | Total | | 2 | 0 | 4 | 0 | — | | — | | 0 | 0 | 6 | 0 |
| Alianza Petrolera | 2017 | Categoría Primera A | 0 | 0 | 0 | 0 | — | | — | | 0 | 0 | 0 | 0 |
| Defensores de Belgrano | 2017–18 | Primera B Metropolitana | 2 | 0 | 0 | 0 | — | | — | | 0 | 0 | 2 | 0 |
| Colegiales | 2018–19 | Primera B Metropolitana | 0 | 0 | 0 | 0 | — | | — | | 0 | 0 | 0 | 0 |
| Career total | | | 11 | 0 | 9 | 0 | — | | — | | 0 | 0 | 20 | 0 |

== Honours ==
Deportivo Morón

- Primera B Metropolitana: 2016–17
