= Claudio Verino =

Argentine footballer

Personal information
- Full name: Claudio Alberto Verino
- Date of birth: January 31, 1984 (age 42)
- Place of birth: Rosario, Argentina
- Height: 1.91 m (6 ft 3 in)
- Position: Centre-back

Team information
- Current team: Sportivo Belgrano

Youth career
- San Lorenzo

Senior career*
| Years | Team | Apps | (Gls) |
| 2004–2005 | San Miguel | 13 | (0) |
| 2005–2006 | Unión Santa Fe | 5 | (0) |
| 2006–2007 | Tristán Suárez | | |
| 2007–2008 | Atlanta | 13 | (1) |
| 2008–2009 | Tristán Suárez | | |
| 2009–2010 | Inter Turku | 14 | (1) |
| 2010–2011 | Colegiales | 22 | (0) |
| 2011–2012 | Douglas Haig | 10 | (0) |
| 2012– 2015 | Sportivo Belgrano | 96 | (5) |
| 2016 | Atlanta | 9 | (0) |
| 2016–2017 | Sarmiento de Resistencia | 27 | (4) |
| 2017–2021 | Chaco For Ever | 39 | (0) |
| 2021 | Sacachispas | 30 | (1) |
| 2022– | Sportivo Belgrano | 14 | (0) |

International career
| | Argentina U15 | 2 | (0) |
- * Club domestic league appearances and goals as of 19:15, 11 August 2022 (UTC)

Claudio Alberto Verino (born January 31, 1984, in Rosario) is an Argentine footballer who plays as a centre-back for Sportivo Belgrano of the Torneo Argentino A in Argentina.
