= Manuel Peralta Salinas =

Paraguayan footballer (born 1988)

Personal information
- Full name: Francisco Manuel Peralta Salinas
- Date of birth: 6 June 1988 (age 38)
- Place of birth: Itauguá, Paraguay
- Height: 1.86 m (6 ft 1 in)
- Position: Goalkeeper

Team information
- Current team: Almirante Brown

Youth career
- El Porvenir

Senior career*
| Years | Team | Apps | (Gls) |
| 2009–2010 | El Porvenir | | |
| 2011 | Cambaceres | 0 | (0) |
| 2011–2012 | Deportivo Capiatá | 0 | (0) |
| 2012 | Deportivo Merlo | 0 | (0) |
| 2012–2014 | El Porvenir | | |
| 2014–2016 | Ferrocarril Midland | 60 | (0) |
| 2017–2019 | Almirante Brown | 10 | (0) |
| 2019 | Excursionistas | 7 | (0) |
| 2020– | Almirante Brown | 4 | (0) |
- * Club domestic league appearances and goals as of 17:12, 8 June 2022 (UTC)

Francisco Manuel Peralta Salinas (born 6 June 1988) is a Paraguayan professional footballer who plays as a goalkeeper for Almirante Brown.

== Career ==
Peralta Salinas' senior career began in Argentina with El Porvenir, as he was with them between 2009 and 2010. 2011 saw Peralta Salinas join Cambaceres, which preceded a stint in Paraguay with Deportivo Capiatá later in the year. Deportivo Merlo signed Peralta Salinas and his brother in 2012, a move that was sanctioned three years later by FIFA after the Buenos Aires outfit had failed to pay his former team fees on time; Deportivo Merlo were deducted six points and fined $450,000. After leaving, Peralta Salinas returned to El Porvenir in late-2012. His first season back ended with relegation to Primera D Metropolitana; the fifth tier.

On 30 June 2014, Peralta Salinas agreed contract terms with Ferrocarril Midland of Primera C Metropolitana. Sixty appearances followed across the next four seasons. Peralta Salinas departed midway through the 2016–17 campaign, subsequently signing with Primera B Metropolitana's Almirante Brown in February 2017. He made his debut against Atlanta on 13 May, on the way to four matches in his first season. After six further appearances, Peralta Salinas left the club to join Excursionistas of Primera C Metropolitana in mid-2019. He'd appear seven times, before securing a return to Almirante Brown in January 2020.

== Personal life ==
Peralta Salinas' brother, Javier, is a fellow professional footballer; they were together at El Porvenir, Deportivo Capiatá and Deportivo Merlo. He has a total of ten brothers, five of which are footballers. He also has one son, who was part of El Porvenir's academy in 2020; also as a goalkeeper.

== Career statistics ==
As of 7 October 2020.

Appearances and goals by club, season and competition
| Club | Season | League | | | Cup | | League Cup | | Continental | | Other | | Total | |
| Club | Season | Division | Apps | Goals | Apps | Goals | Apps | Goals | Apps | Goals | Apps | Goals | Apps | Goals |
|---|---|---|---|---|---|---|---|---|---|---|---|---|---|---|
| Cambaceres | 2010–11 | Primera C Metropolitana | 0 | 0 | 0 | 0 | — | | — | | 0 | 0 | 0 | 0 |
| Deportivo Merlo | 2011–12 | Primera B Nacional | 0 | 0 | 0 | 0 | — | | — | | 0 | 0 | 0 | 0 |
| El Porvenir | 2013–14 | Primera D Metropolitana | 18 | 0 | 1 | 0 | — | | — | | 0 | 0 | 19 | 0 |
| Almirante Brown | 2016–17 | Primera B Metropolitana | 4 | 0 | 0 | 0 | — | | — | | 0 | 0 | 4 | 0 |
| Almirante Brown | 2017–18 | Primera B Metropolitana | 1 | 0 | 0 | 0 | — | | — | | 0 | 0 | 1 | 0 |
| Almirante Brown | 2018–19 | Primera B Metropolitana | 5 | 0 | 0 | 0 | — | | — | | 0 | 0 | 5 | 0 |
| Almirante Brown | Total | | 10 | 0 | 0 | 0 | — | | — | | 0 | 0 | 10 | 0 |
| Excursionistas | 2019–20 | Primera C Metropolitana | 7 | 0 | 0 | 0 | — | | — | | 0 | 0 | 7 | 0 |
| Almirante Brown | 2019–20 | Primera B Metropolitana | 0 | 0 | 0 | 0 | — | | — | | 0 | 0 | 0 | 0 |
| Career total | | | 35 | 0 | 1 | 0 | — | | — | | 0 | 0 | 36 | 0 |
