= Tobías Moriceau =

Argentine professional footballer

Personal information
- Full name: Tobías Andre Moriceau
- Date of birth: 9 April 1997 (age 29)
- Place of birth: Olivos, Argentina
- Height: 1.73 m (5 ft 8 in)
- Position: Midfielder

Team information
- Current team: Paternò

Youth career
- Colegiales

Senior career*
Years	Team	Apps	(Gls)
2019–2020	Colegiales	18	(0)
2020–2022	Club Almagro	0	(0)
2022–2023	Independiente Petrolero	22	(0)
2023–2024	Royal Pari	42	(1)
2025	The Strongest	21	(1)
2026–	Paternò	0	(0)
- * Club domestic league appearances and goals as of 22 February 2026

Tobías Andre Moriceau (born 9 April 1997) is an Argentine professional footballer who plays as a midfielder for Serie D club Paternò.

== Career ==
Colegiales gave Moriceau his beginning in senior football. Alejandro Nanía promoted the midfielder into first-team football in March 2019, as he started Primera B Metropolitana matches against All Boys, Fénix and Almirante Brown; playing the full duration of all three. His next appearance arrived two months later against Atlanta.

== Career statistics ==
As of 8 May 2019.

Appearances and goals by club, season and competition
Club	Season	League			Cup		League Cup		Continental		Other		Total	
Club	Season	Division	Apps	Goals	Apps	Goals	Apps	Goals	Apps	Goals	Apps	Goals	Apps	Goals
Colegiales	2018–19	Primera B Metropolitana	4	0	0	0	—		—		0	0	4	0
Career total			4	0	0	0	—		—		0	0	4	0
