= Florida Oeste =

- District
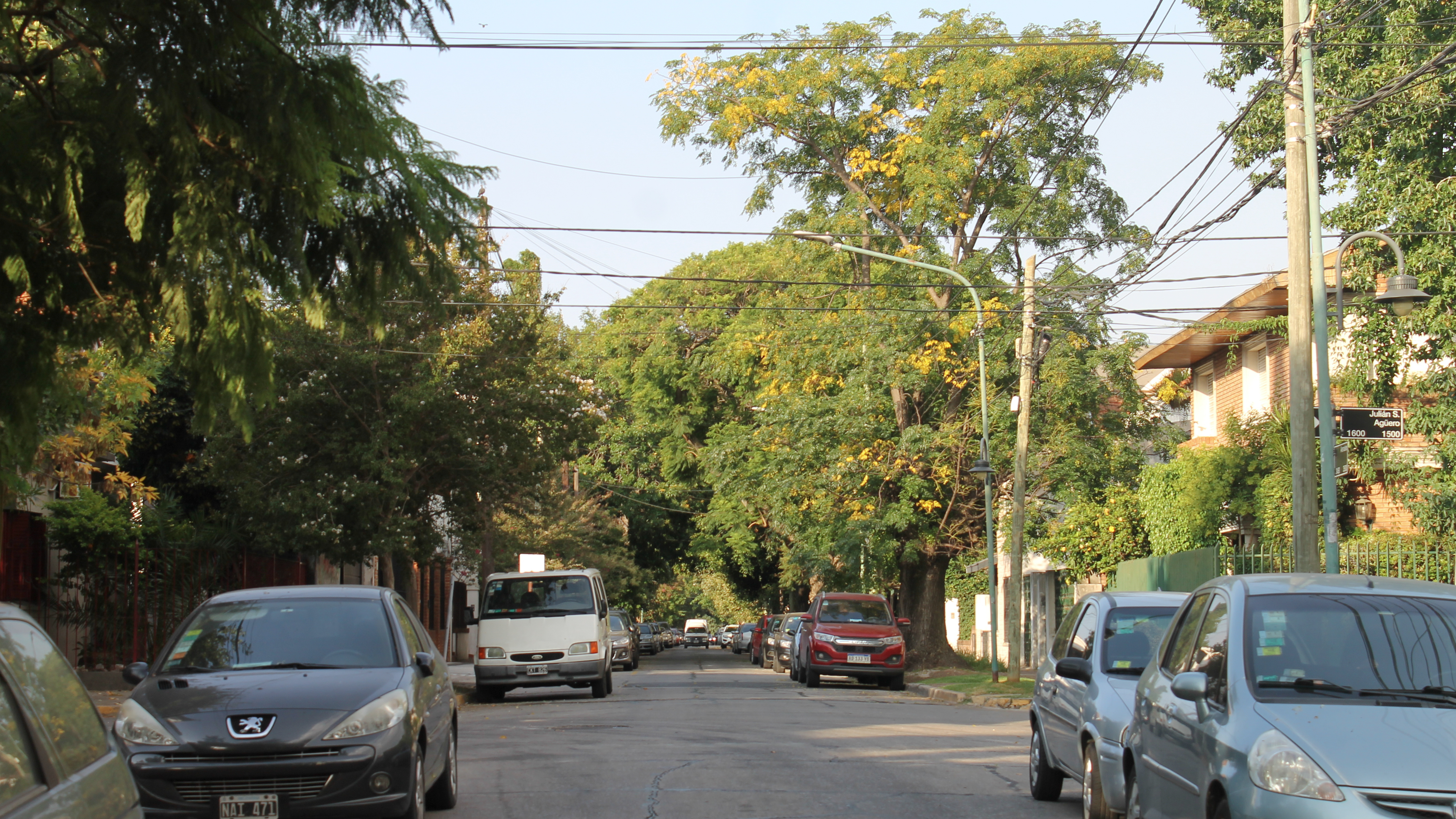
- View of Florida Oeste.

- Location in Greater Buenos Aires Florida Oeste (Argentina)
- Coordinates: 34°32′S 58°30′W
- Country: Argentina
- Province: Buenos Aires
- Partido: Vicente López
- Founded: 1913; 113 years ago
- Elevation: 13 m (43 ft)

Population (2001 census [INDEC])
  - Total: 27,733
- CPA Base: B 1602
- Area code: +54 11
- Website: lapaginadeflorida.com.ar

Florida Oeste is a city of the Vicente López Partido in the northern suburbs of Greater Buenos Aires, Argentina. It is principally a middle-class and industrial neighbourhood located between the barrios of Villa Martelli and Munro, also in the same partido (department).

== Geography ==
The city is located between Avenida de los Constituyentes (in the limit with General San Martín Partido) and the Autopista Pascual Palazzo (mostly known as "Panamericana" or "Acceso Norte"). This highway divides the district into two neighborhoods: Florida Este (from Panamaricana to Maipú Avenue) and Florida Oeste (from Panamericana to Constituyentes Avenue). The other boundaries are Antonio Malavar (at north) and Carlos F. Melo (at south) streets.

Florida Oeste is served by the Belgrano Norte Line, which provide easy access to the city of Buenos Aires as well as north of GBA, such as Boulogne Sur Mer, Grand Bourg and Del Viso. Florida Oeste's main commercial areas are centered on General San Martín and Mitre Avenues.

== History ==
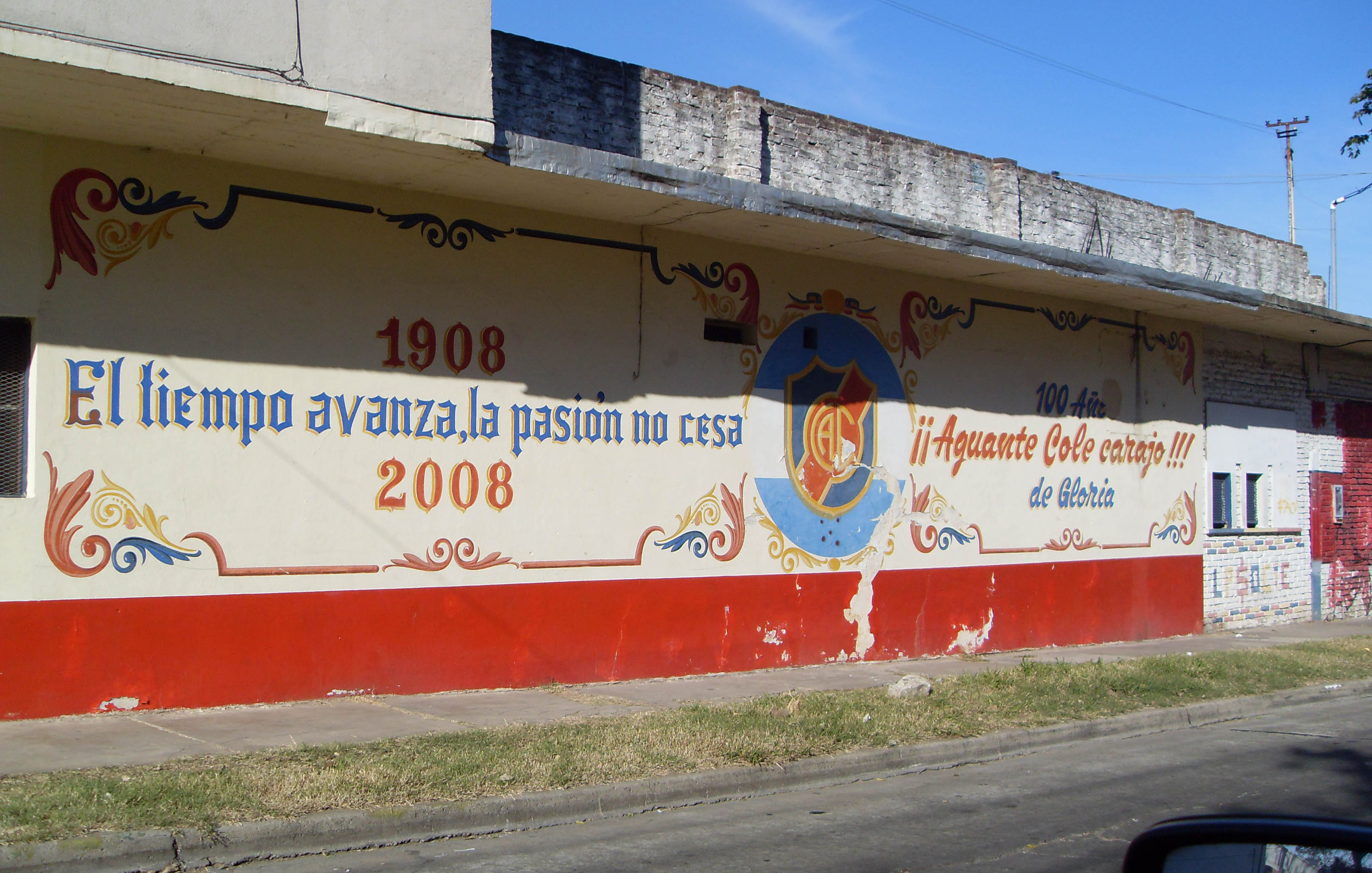
Colegiales, the most notable club of the neighborhood.

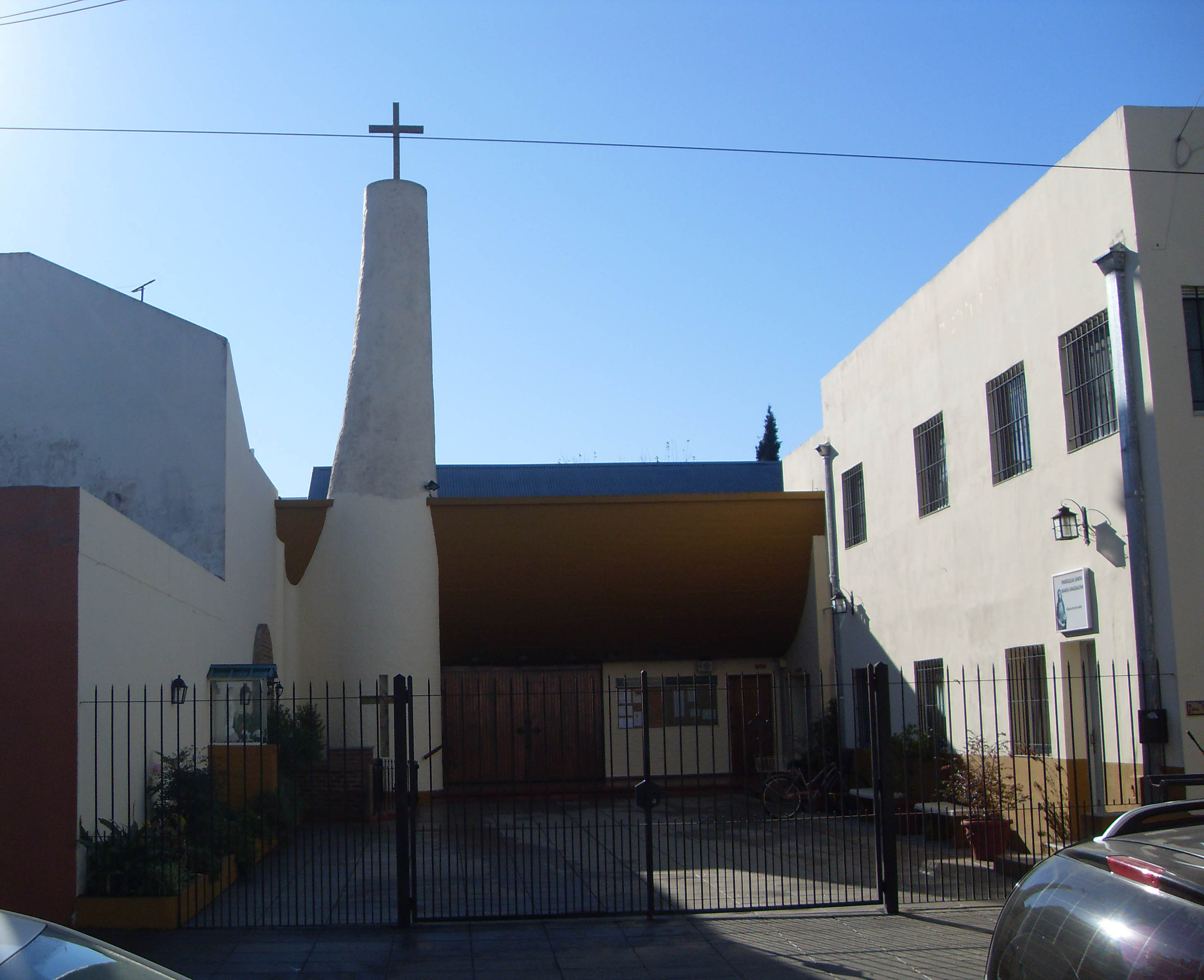
Santa María Magdalena church.

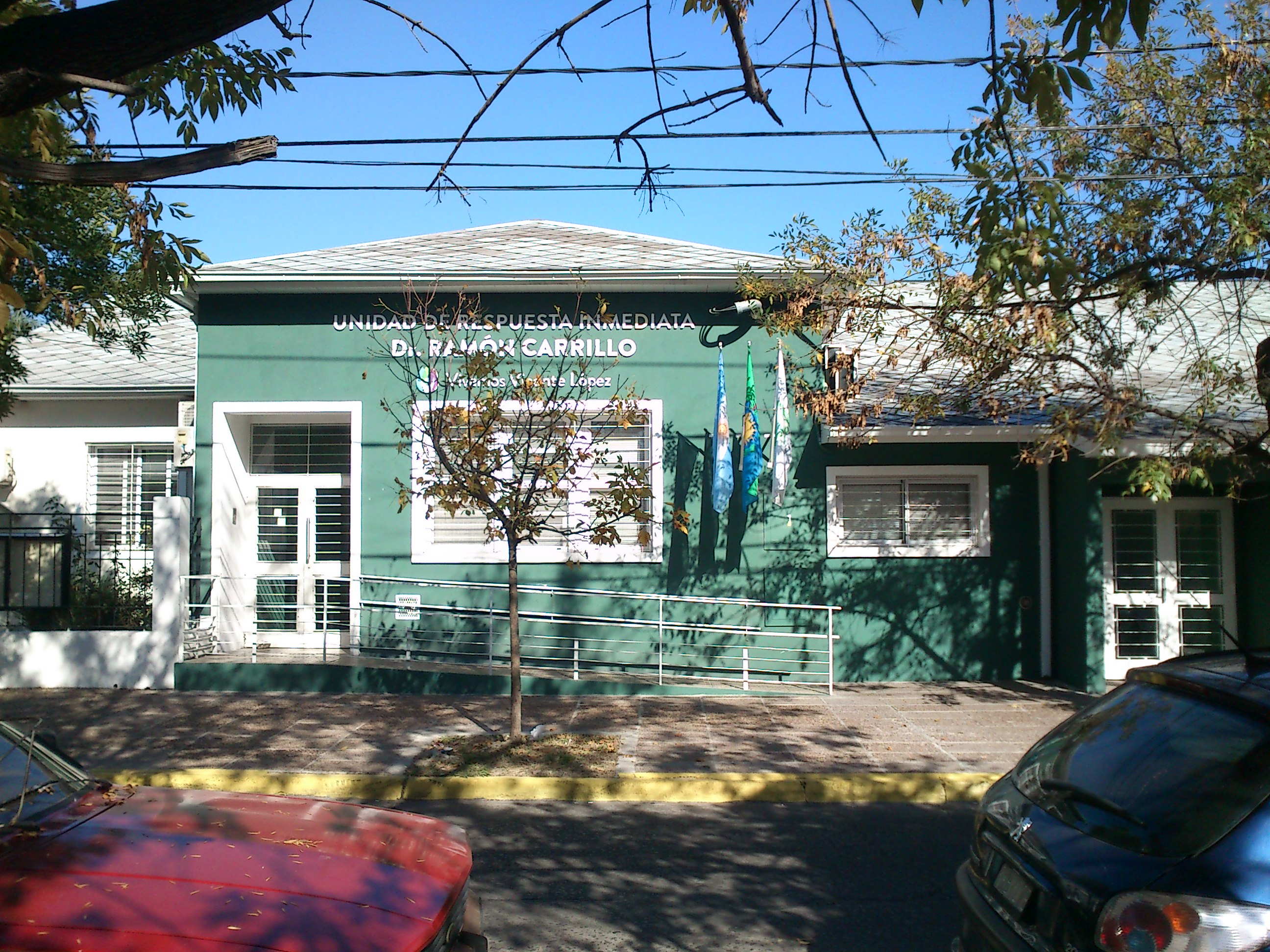
Ramón Carrillo health centre.

In 1907 the Córdoba Central Railway extended its tracks to the lands where Florida Oeste exists nowadays. The station was a precarious stop with no name, informally nicknamed La Trocha (The Gauge). In 1913, a local company, Narciso Agüero & Cía., was granted a concession to pave San Martín Avenue. While works were in progress, a big poster with the name of the company was placed there so people named it as "Agüero". In 1920 the old roof was replaced with a building with sheds. By request from the neighborhoods, the station was officially named "Florida".

Helped by the railway, many families came to the region and settled their stores, selling goods to farmers and railway workers. The increasing development of Florida brought other transportations, such as buses with Fano and Boraso companies among them. The first sport clubs were also founded by then, American Football Club (a predecessor of Florida Football Club) in 1934, Unión Florida in 1929 and the Florida Club (after the merging of Asociación de Fomento Vecinal and Florida FC).

In the 1930s a large amount of factories were established in Florida Oeste, some of them were La Hidrófila (textile industry), 3M, Editorial Abril, Refinerías de Maíz, Casa Sudamericana, Granix, among others.

Some schools of the neighborhood are Mariano Moreno n° 5 (established in 1908), José Mármol n° 14 (1926), Lucas Azcuaga n° 33 (1956). The first church was Parroquia Santa María Magdalena, opened in 1963.

The Santa Rosa Hospital and Maternity was founded in October 1944, being the 2nd among the most important health centers of Vicente López. Originally a maternity only, the building was successively remodeled and enlarged to host more services.

In July 2013 was opened the "Unidad de Respuesta Inmediata" (URI) Ramón Carrillo, a health center for emergencies that also handles dentistry, pediatrics, cardiology, traumatology and mental health among other medical specialities.

Florida Oeste has a large number of sport clubs, being Colegiales the most notable of them. Having been founded on April 1, 1908, the club played in the Primera División, the top division of Argentine football league system during the 1920s.

In 1948 the club moved to its current location in Antonio Malaver and Gervasio Posadas streets of Florida Oeste.
