= Campagnano =

Campagnano may refer to:

- Campagnano di Roma, comune in the Metropolitan City of Rome in the Italian region of Latium
- Campagnano (surname), surname
- Castel Campagnano, comune in the Province of Caserta in the Italian region Campania

== See also ==
- Campagnaro
