= Esteban Giambuzzi =

Argentine professional footballer

Personal information
- Full name: Esteban Gabriel Giambuzzi
- Date of birth: 30 May 1989 (age 37)
- Place of birth: San Martín, Argentina
- Height: 1.82 m (6 ft 0 in)
- Position: Right-back

Team information
- Current team: Fidelis Andria
- Number: 23

Senior career*
Years	Team	Apps	(Gls)
2010–2011	Almagro	48	(2)
2011–2013	Comunicaciones	59	(4)
2013–2014	Deportivo Morón	16	(0)
2014–2015	Colegiales	37	(5)
2016	Defensores de Belgrano	12	(1)
2016–2017	Sportivo Italiano	29	(7)
2017–2018	Tigre	3	(0)
2018–2019	Colegiales	29	(3)
2019–2020	Anconitana	23	(5)
2020–2021	Virtus Matino	8	(2)
2021–2022	Molfetta	21	(2)
2022–2023	Manfredonia		
2023–	Fidelis Andria	4	(0)
- * Club domestic league appearances and goals as of 1 October 2023

Esteban Gabriel Giambuzzi (born 30 May 1989) is an Argentine professional footballer who plays as a right-back for Italian Serie D club Fidelis Andria.

== Career ==
Giambuzzi's career began with Almagro. He participated in forty-eight fixtures for the Primera B Metropolitana outfit, whilst also netting goals against Colegiales and Nueva Chicago respectively. In June 2011, Giambuzzi moved across the division to Comunicaciones. He scored in consecutive fixtures in September versus Los Andes and Acassuso, as he appeared twenty-five times in the 2012–13 campaign. Another two goals came in season two, which preceded Giambuzzi signing for Deportivo Morón ahead of 2013–14. He'd appear eighteen times for them, as he was sent off in his final match versus Defensores de Belgrano.

Colegiales signed Giambuzzi on 31 July 2014. Five goals occurred across 2014 and 2015. Giambuzzi subsequently had spells with Defensores de Belgrano and Sportivo Italiano, notably scoring seven times for the latter in Primera C Metropolitana. August 2017 saw Giambuzzi join Ricardo Caruso Lombardi's Tigre. His bow arrived in the Primera División on 22 September versus Belgrano, as he arrived off the bench in place of Daniel Imperiale; two further appearances in games with River Plate and Rosario Central, where he suffered a knee injury, occurred. On 24 July 2018, Giambuzzi agreed terms to return to Colegiales.

In July 2019, Giambuzzi joined Italian Eccellenza Marche club US Anconitana. He scored five goals in twenty-three fixtures in 2019–20.

== Career statistics ==
As of 15 July 2020.

Appearances and goals by club, season and competition
Club	Season	League			Cup		League Cup		Continental		Other		Total	
Club	Season	Division	Apps	Goals	Apps	Goals	Apps	Goals	Apps	Goals	Apps	Goals	Apps	Goals
Comunicaciones	2011–12	Primera B Metropolitana	25	2	0	0	—		—		0	0	25	2
Comunicaciones	2012–13	Primera B Metropolitana	34	2	0	0	—		—		0	0	34	2
Comunicaciones	Total		59	4	0	0	—		—		0	0	59	4
Deportivo Morón	2013–14	Primera B Metropolitana	16	0	2	0	—		—		0	0	18	0
Colegiales	2014	Primera B Metropolitana	13	3	1	0	—		—		0	0	14	3
Colegiales	2015	Primera B Metropolitana	24	2	0	0	—		—		0	0	24	2
Colegiales	Total		37	5	1	0	—		—		0	0	38	5
Defensores de Belgrano	2016	Primera B Metropolitana	12	1	0	0	—		—		0	0	12	1
Sportivo Italiano	2016–17	Primera C Metropolitana	29	7	0	0	—		—		0	0	29	7
Tigre	2017–18	Primera División	3	0	0	0	—		—		0	0	3	0
Colegiales	2018–19	Primera B Metropolitana	29	3	0	0	—		—		2 (Note: Appearance(s) in the Primera B Metropolitana play-offs)	0	31	3
US Anconitana	2019–20	Eccellenza Marche	23	5	0	0	—		—		0	0	23	5
Career total			208	25	3	0	—		—		2	0	213	25
