= Facundo Stable =

Argentine professional footballer

Personal information
- Full name: Facundo Nahuel Stable
- Date of birth: 2 July 1995 (age 31)
- Place of birth: Argentina
- Position: Right winger

Team information
- Current team: Unión Magdalena
- Number: 11

Senior career*
Years	Team	Apps	(Gls)
2013–2021	Colegiales	125	(8)
2018	→ Deportivo Riestra (loan)	2	(0)
2021	→ Barracas Central (loan)	33	(3)
2022	Barracas Central	4	(0)
2022–	Unión Magdalena	3	(0)
- * Club domestic league appearances and goals as of 19:09, 8 September 2022 (UTC)

Facundo Nahuel Stable (born 2 July 1995) is an Argentine professional footballer who plays as a right winger for Unión Magdalena.

== Club career ==
Stable began his career in his country's third tier with Colegiales. He made his professional bow during the 2013–14 Primera B Metropolitana season against Villa Dálmine, replacing Ramiro Fergonzi late on in a 2–1 victory on 7 December 2013; Stable scored his first senior goal versus the same opponents in the succeeding May. A total of seventy-six appearances arrived in six seasons, along with five further goals for them; three of which were scored in separate games with Barracas Central. In January 2018, Stable completed a loan move to Primera B Nacional side Deportivo Riestra. Two appearances followed.

== International career ==
In 2016, Stable trained with the Argentina U23s in preparation for the Sait Nagjee Trophy; though didn't make the final squad after Colegiales withdrew him.

== Career statistics ==
As of 8 May 2019.

Appearances and goals by club, season and competition
Club	Season	League			Cup		League Cup		Continental		Other		Total	
Club	Season	Division	Apps	Goals	Apps	Goals	Apps	Goals	Apps	Goals	Apps	Goals	Apps	Goals
Colegiales	2013–14	Primera B Metropolitana	10	1	0	0	—		—		0	0	10	1
Colegiales	2014	Primera B Metropolitana	6	0	1	0	—		—		0	0	7	0
Colegiales	2015	Primera B Metropolitana	26	2	0	0	—		—		0	0	26	2
Colegiales	2016	Primera B Metropolitana	3	1	0	0	—		—		0	0	3	1
Colegiales	2016–17	Primera B Metropolitana	15	0	0	0	—		—		0	0	15	0
Colegiales	2017–18	Primera B Metropolitana	15	2	0	0	—		—		0	0	15	2
Colegiales	2018–19	Primera B Metropolitana	30	2	0	0	—		—		0	0	30	2
Colegiales	Total		105	8	1	0	—		—		0	0	106	8
Deportivo Riestra (loan)	2017–18	Primera B Nacional	2	0	0	0	—		—		0	0	2	0
Career total			107	8	1	0	—		—		0	0	108	8
