= Marco Campagnaro =

Argentine footballer

Personal information
- Full name: Marco Campagnaro
- Date of birth: 3 April 2003 (age 23)
- Place of birth: Rosario, Argentina
- Height: 1.81 m (5 ft 11 in)
- Position: Left-back

Team information
- Current team: Deportivo Maipú

Youth career
- Newell's Old Boys

Senior career*
Years	Team	Apps	(Gls)
2020–2024	Newell's Old Boys	16	(0)
2024	→ Cobreloa (loan)	4	(0)
2024	→ Caracas (loan)	5	(0)
2025–	Deportivo Maipú	2	(0)

International career
2019	Argentina U16	1	(0)
- * Club domestic league appearances and goals as of 16:26, 4 August 2025 (UTC)

Marco Campagnaro (born 3 April 2003) is an Argentine footballer who plays as a left-back for Deportivo Maipú.

== Club career ==
Born in Rosario, Argentina, Campagnaro is a product of Newell's Old Boys and made his debut in an Argentine Primera División match against Independiente on 31 October 2021. A regular player during the 2022 season, he suffered an ACL injury at the beginning of 2023.

In 2024, he was loaned out to Chilean club Cobreloa in the Chilean Primera División on a one-year deal with an option to buy.

== International career ==
Campagnaro represented Argentina at under-16 level in the 2019 Montaigu Tournament, where they became the champions. He entered in 2–2 draw against Ivory Coast on 20 April.
