= Facundo González Miranda =

Mexican politician (born 1953)

- Born: 16 October 1953 (age 72); State of Mexico, Mexico
- Occupation: Politician
- Political party: PRD

Facundo González Miranda (born 16 October 1953) is a Mexican politician from the Party of the Democratic Revolution. In 2009 he served as Deputy of the LX Legislature of the Mexican Congress representing the State of Mexico.
