= Deportivo Maipú =

Argentine football club

- Full name: Club Deportivo Maipú
- Nicknames: Botellero; Caracoles; Cruzado; Super Depor
- Founded: December 16, 1927; 98 years ago
- Ground: Estadio Omar Higinio Sperdutti, Maipú, Mendoza Province, Argentina
- Capacity: 8,000
- Chairman: Omar Sperdutti
- Manager: Alexis Matteo
- League: Primera Nacional
- 2025: Primera Nacional Zone A, 7th of 18
- Website: deportivomaipu.com
Home colours	Away colours	Third colours

Club Deportivo Maipú, mostly known as Deportivo Maipú is an Argentine football club based in the city of Maipú, Mendoza. The team currently plays in Primera Nacional, the league of second level on the Argentine football league system.

== Current squad ==
As of 28 Julu 2025

Note: Flags indicate national team as defined under FIFA eligibility rules; some limited exceptions apply. Players may hold more than one non-FIFA nationality.

No.	Pos.	Nation	Player
—	GK	ARG	Ignacio Pietrobono
—	GK	ARG	Nahuel Galardi
—	DF	ARG	Arón Agüero
—	DF	ARG	Luciano Arnijas
—	DF	ARG	Marco Campagnaro
—	DF	ARG	Juan Pablo De La Reta
—	DF	ARG	Lucas Faggioli
—	DF	ARG	Agustín Leiva
—	DF	ARG	Álvaro Páez
—	DF	ARG	Luciano Paredes
—	MF	ARG	Juan Cruz Arno
—	MF	ARG	Mirk Bonfigli
—	MF	ARG	Agustín Bustinduy
—	MF	ARG	Marcelo Eggel
—	MF	ARG	Alan Galeano
—	MF	ARG	Gastón Mansilla

No.	Pos.	Nation	Player
—	MF	ARG	Emiliano Ozuna
—	MF	ARG	Santiago Paulini
—	MF	ARG	Rubens Sambueza
—	MF	ARG	Tomás Silva
—	MF	ARG	Lucas Vallejo (loan from Santamarina)
—	MF	ARG	Matías Viguet
—	MF	ARG	Matías Villarreal
—	FW	ARG	Pío Bonacci
—	FW	ARG	Mauro Chacón
—	FW	ARG	Agustín Gaitán
—	FW	ARG	Agustín Páez
—	FW	ARG	Lucas Palma
—	FW	ARG	Franco Saccone (loan from Gutiérrez)
—	FW	ARG	Juan Manuel Sánchez
—	FW	ARG	Iván Sandoval

== Honours ==
=== Regional ===
- Primera A de Liga Mendocina
  - Winners (4): 1953, 1958, 1985–86, 2003
- Primera B de Liga Mendocina
  - Winners (4): 1933, 1982, 1993–94, 1998
