= Facundo Echevarría =

Argentine professional footballer

Personal information
- Date of birth: 31 July 2002 (age 24)
- Place of birth: Carcarañá, Argentina
- Height: 1.79 m (5 ft 10 in)
- Position: Forward

Team information
- Current team: Los Andes (on loan from Defensa y Justicia)

Youth career
- CA Carcarañá
- Defensa y Justicia

Senior career*
Years	Team	Apps	(Gls)
2020–	Defensa y Justicia	18	(2)
2025	→ Arsenal Sarandí (loan)	4	(0)
2025–	→ Los Andes (loan)	15	(1)
- * Club domestic league appearances and goals as of 17:24, 29 April 2026 (UTC)

Facundo Echevarría (born 31 July 2002) is an Argentine professional footballer who plays as a forward for Los Andes, on loan from Defensa y Justicia.

== Career ==
Echevarría joined the youth ranks of Defensa y Justicia from hometown side Club Atlético Carcarañá. He made the breakthrough into manager Hernán Crespo's first-team squad in December 2020, initially appearing on the bench for a Copa de la Liga Profesional win on the road against Unión Santa Fe. Echevarría's senior debut arrived in the aforementioned competition on 2 January 2021 during a fixture with Rosario Central, as he replaced Nicolás Leguizamón off the bench in a 3–0 defeat away from home.

In January 2025, he joined Primera Nacional club Arsenal Sarandí on loan until the end of the following year.

== Career statistics ==
As of 2 January 2021.

Appearances and goals by club, season and competition
Club	Season	League			Cup		League Cup		Continental		Other		Total	
Club	Season	Division	Apps	Goals	Apps	Goals	Apps	Goals	Apps	Goals	Apps	Goals	Apps	Goals
Defensa y Justicia	2020–21 (Note: Soccerway counts Copa de la Liga Profesional appearances as league appearances.)	Primera División	1	0	0	0	0	0	0	0	0	0	1	0
Career total			1	0	0	0	0	0	0	0	0	0	1	0
