= Diego Chávez (footballer, born 1997) =

Argentine footballer (born 1997)

Personal information
- Full name: Diego Gabriel Chávez
- Date of birth: 24 September 1997 (age 29)
- Place of birth: Chaco, Argentina
- Height: 1.80 m (5 ft 11 in)
- Position: Midfielder

Team information
- Current team: Atletico Bucaramanga
- Number: 15

Youth career
- 2008–2018: Independiente

Senior career*
Years	Team	Apps	(Gls)
2018–2020	Colegiales	49	(5)
2020–2022	Ferro Carril Oeste	9	(0)
2022	CA Temperley	12	(2)
2022	Union Magdalena	19	(5)
2023	Atletico Bucaramanga	37	(2)
2024	Deportivo Pasto	41	(6)
2025–	Atletico Bucaramanga	22	(0)
- * Club domestic league appearances and goals as of 11 December 2025

Diego Gabriel Chávez (born 24 September 1997) is an Argentine professional footballer who plays as a midfielder for Colombian club Atletico Bucaramanga.

== Career ==
Having come through the youth ranks at Independiente from 2008, Chávez started his senior career in 2018 with Primera B Metropolitana side Colegiales. He made his professional debut on 6 October 2018 in a home loss to Almirante Brown, with his first goal arriving in the subsequent month against Talleres. Later in the season, on 27 January 2019, Chávez netted a brace in a 2–0 victory over Acassuso. He received two red cards across the next two months against San Telmo and Defensores Unidos respectively.

== Career statistics ==
As of 8 May 2019.

Appearances and goals by club, season and competition
Club	Season	League			Cup		League Cup		Continental		Other		Total	
Club	Season	Division	Apps	Goals	Apps	Goals	Apps	Goals	Apps	Goals	Apps	Goals	Apps	Goals
Colegiales	2018–19	Primera B Metropolitana	21	3	0	0	—		—		0	0	21	3
Career total			21	3	0	0	—		—		0	0	21	3
