= Santiago Tallarico =

Argentine professional footballer

Personal information
- Full name: Santiago Gastón Tallarico
- Date of birth: 23 March 1997 (age 29)
- Place of birth: Argentina
- Height: 1.86 m (6 ft 1 in)
- Position: Defender

Team information
- Current team: Colegiales

Youth career
- Boca Juniors

Senior career*
Years	Team	Apps	(Gls)
2018	Sud América	5	(0)
2018–	Colegiales	1	(0)
- * Club domestic league appearances and goals as of 00:43, 8 May 2019 (UTC)

Santiago Gastón Tallarico (born 23 March 1997) is an Argentine professional footballer who plays as a defender for Colegiales.

== Career ==
Tallarico appeared in the youth system of Boca Juniors. In 2018, Tallarico moved to Uruguayan Segunda División side Sud América. His senior debut arrived on 24 March during a home defeat to Juventud, which preceded a further start later that month against Central Español. In the third of his five appearances in Uruguay, the defender was sent off in a fixture with Rentistas on 6 May. On 13 July 2018, Tallarico returned to Argentina with Colegiales of Primera B Metropolitana.

== Career statistics ==
As of 8 May 2019.

Appearances and goals by club, season and competition
Club	Season	League			Cup		League Cup		Continental		Other		Total	
Club	Season	Division	Apps	Goals	Apps	Goals	Apps	Goals	Apps	Goals	Apps	Goals	Apps	Goals
Sud América	2018	Segunda División	5	0	—		—		—		0	0	5	0
Colegiales	2018–19	Primera B Metropolitana	1	0	0	0	—		—		0	0	1	0
Career total			6	0	0	0	—		—		0	0	6	0
