= Susette Talarico =

American political scientist

Susette M. Talarico
- Born: May 10, 1946; Danbury, Connecticut
- Died: May 23, 2007 (aged 61)
- Education: Diocesan Sisters College; University of Connecticut
- Scientific career
- Fields: Political science
- Workplaces: Saint Michael's College; University of Georgia

Susette M. Talarico (May 10, 1946 – May 23, 2007) was an American political scientist and legal scholar. She specialized in the study of judicial politics and criminal justice. Talarico was a Professor of Political Science at the University of Georgia from 1977 until her retirement in 2006. There she held a variety of professorships, including being the Albert Berry Saye Professor of American Government and Constitutional Law and a Josiah Meigs Distinguished Teaching Professor at the University of Georgia School of Public and International Affairs.

== Life and career ==
Talarico was born on May 10, 1946, in Danbury, Connecticut. After graduating from high school, Talarico joined the Sisters of Mercy, and earned her bachelor's degree at the Diocesan Sisters College. After six years in the Sisters of Mercy, Talarico left and attended graduate school at the University of Connecticut, where she obtained a master's degree followed by a PhD in 1976. She then began teaching at Saint Michael's College, before moving to the University of Georgia in 1977. She remained there until her retirement in 2006. At the University of Georgia she was named the Albert Berry Saye Professor of American Government and Constitutional Law, as well as a Josiah Meigs Distinguished Teaching Professor in the School of Public and International Affairs. She was a Charter Member of the Teaching Academy there, twice won the Josiah Meigs Award for excellence in instruction, held a three-year appointment as the General Sandy Beaver Teaching Professor at the Franklin College of Arts and Sciences, and was a Danforth Teaching Fellow for six years. For several years, Talarico was the only woman with tenure in the University of Georgia Department of Political Science.

Talarico's research focused on judicial politics and the study of criminal justice. For example, her 1987 book The social contexts of criminal sentencing with Martha A. Myers was one of the first studies of the social contexts of criminal sentences, and in 1980 she edited a compendium of research methods and practices in criminal justice research, called Criminal justice research: Approaches, problems, and policy. For six years, Talarico was the editor-in-chief of the Justice System Journal.

After Talarico's death, an annual Talarico Lecture at the University of Georgia was funded in her honor. The Department of Political Science at the University of Georgia also endowed the Susette M. Talarico Public Service Leadership Award.

== Selected works ==
- Criminal justice research: Approaches, problems, and policy (1980)
- "The social contexts of racial discrimination in sentencing", Social Problems, with Marta A. Myers (1986)
- The social contexts of criminal sentencing, with Martha A. Myers (1987)
