= Facundo Ponzio =

Argentine footballer

Personal information
- Full name: Facundo Agustín Ponzio
- Date of birth: 14 November 1995 (age 30)
- Place of birth: Córdoba, Argentina
- Height: 1.85 m (6 ft 1 in)
- Position: Forward

Team information
- Current team: Badalona (on loan from Instituto)

Youth career
- Instituto

Senior career*
Years	Team	Apps	(Gls)
2013–	Instituto	5	(1)
2014–	→ Badalona (loan)	7	(0)
- * Club domestic league appearances and goals as of 8 June 2014

Facundo Agustín Ponzio (born 14 November 1995) is an Argentinian footballer who plays for CF Badalona in Spain, on loan from Instituto, as a forward.

== Club career ==
Born in Córdoba, Ponzio graduated from hometown Instituto's youth setup. He played his first match as a professional on 28 May 2013, aged 17, in a 2–0 home loss against Gimnasia La Plata in the Primera B Nacional.

On 2 June Ponzio was handed his first start, and scored his side's first in a 2–3 away defeat against CA Patronato. He renewed his link with Instituto (which sold 20% of his rights to a business company) on 26 July 2013, signing until 2016.

However, Ponzio was rarely played during the 2013–14 campaign, and subsequently was loaned to Spanish Segunda División B side CF Badalona on 5 September 2014.
