= Facundo Placeres =

Uruguayan footballer (born 1995)

Personal information
- Full name: Facundo Placeres Busto
- Date of birth: 16 October 1995 (age 31)
- Place of birth: Montevideo, Uruguay
- Height: 1.72 m (5 ft 8 in)
- Position: Midfielder

Youth career
- –2014: Huracán

Senior career*
| Years | Team | Apps | (Gls) |
| 2014–2015 | Huracán | 3 | (0) |
| 2016–2017 | Fénix | 0 | (0) |
| 2019 | San Teodoro | | |
| 2019 | Villa Española | 0 | (0) |
| 2020 | Bangor City | | |
- * Club domestic league appearances and goals as of 25 August 2020

Facundo Placeres Busto (born 16 October 1995) is a Uruguayan footballer who plays as a midfielder.

== Career statistics ==
=== Club ===
As of 25 August 2020.

| Club | Season | League | | | Cup | | Continental | | Other | | Total | |
| Club | Season | Division | Apps | Goals | Apps | Goals | Apps | Goals | Apps | Goals | Apps | Goals |
|---|---|---|---|---|---|---|---|---|---|---|---|---|
| Huracán | 2014–15 | Segunda División | 3 | 0 | 0 | 0 | – | | 0 | 0 | 3 | 0 |
| Huracán | 2015–16 | Segunda División | 0 | 0 | 0 | 0 | – | | 0 | 0 | 0 | 0 |
| Huracán | Total | | 3 | 0 | 0 | 0 | 0 | 0 | 0 | 0 | 3 | 0 |
| Fénix | 2016 | Primera División | 0 | 0 | 0 | 0 | – | | 0 | 0 | 0 | 0 |
| Fénix | 2017 | Primera División | 0 | 0 | 0 | 0 | – | | 0 | 0 | 0 | 0 |
| Fénix | Total | | 0 | 0 | 0 | 0 | 0 | 0 | 0 | 0 | 0 | 0 |
| Villa Española | 2019 | Segunda División | 0 | 0 | 0 | 0 | – | | 0 | 0 | 0 | 0 |
| Career total | | | 3 | 0 | 0 | 0 | 0 | 0 | 0 | 0 | 3 | 0 |
