= Lucas Faggioli =

Argentine professional footballer

Personal information
- Full name: Lucas Faggioli
- Date of birth: 11 February 1997 (age 29)
- Place of birth: Argentina
- Position: Defender

Team information
- Current team: Deportivo Maipú

Senior career*
| Years | Team | Apps | (Gls) |
| 2018–2022 | Colegiales | 53 | (0) |
| 2022– | Deportivo Maipú | 60 | (6) |
| 2023 | → Ferro Carril Oeste (loan) | 16 | (0) |
| 2024 | → Barracas Central (loan) | 2 | (0) |
- * Club domestic league appearances and goals as of 17:17, 27 April 2026 (UTC)

Lucas Faggioli (born 11 February 1997) is an Argentine professional footballer who plays as a defender for Deportivo Maipú.

== Career ==
Faggioli's senior career got underway with Colegiales of Primera B Metropolitana. He made the breakthrough during the 2017–18 campaign, appearing for his professional debut on 18 March 2018 against Sacachispas. He made five further appearances under Leonardo Estévez as they placed fifteenth.

== Career statistics ==
As of 6 May 2019.

Appearances and goals by club, season and competition
| Club | Season | League | | | Cup | | League Cup | | Continental | | Other | | Total | |
| Club | Season | Division | Apps | Goals | Apps | Goals | Apps | Goals | Apps | Goals | Apps | Goals | Apps | Goals |
|---|---|---|---|---|---|---|---|---|---|---|---|---|---|---|
| Colegiales | 2017–18 | Primera B Metropolitana | 6 | 0 | 0 | 0 | — | | — | | 0 | 0 | 6 | 0 |
| Colegiales | 2018–19 | Primera B Metropolitana | 5 | 0 | 0 | 0 | — | | — | | 0 | 0 | 5 | 0 |
| Career total | | | 11 | 0 | 0 | 0 | — | | — | | 0 | 0 | 11 | 0 |
