= Facundo Núñez =

Uruguayan football player (born 2006)

Personal information
- Full name: Facundo Mariano Núñez Techera
- Date of birth: 24 February 2006 (age 20)
- Place of birth: Canelones, Uruguay
- Height: 1.72 m (5 ft 8 in)
- Position: Forward

Youth career
- Liverpool de Canelones
- Cerro Largo

Senior career*
Years	Team	Apps	(Gls)
2021–2024	Cerro Largo	27	(0)
2024	→ Colorado Rapids 2 (loan)	13	(2)
2025–2026	Liverpool Montevideo	2	(0)
Total		42	(2)

International career
2021	Uruguay U15	1	(0)
2022	Uruguay U17	12	(0)
- * Club domestic league appearances and goals

Facundo Mariano Núñez Techera (born 24 February 2006) is a Uruguayan former footballer who played as a forward.

== Club career ==
A former youth academy player of Liverpool de Canelones, Núñez joined Cerro Largo in 2021. He made his professional debut on 14 April 2021 in a 4–1 Copa Sudamericana defeat to Peñarol. Aged 15 years and 49 days, this made him the youngest player in tournament's history. On 31 October 2021, he made his league debut in a 4–1 win against Fénix.

On 1 April 2024, Núñez joined Colorado Rapids 2 on a six-month loan deal. In January 2025, he joined Liverpool Montevideo. He retired from professional football in July 2026.

== International career ==
Núñez has represented Uruguay at multiple youth levels. He was part of Uruguay's under-17 team in 2022.

== Personal life ==
Núñez is the younger brother of footballer Carlos Núñez.

== Career statistics ==
Appearances and goals by club, season and competition
Club	Season	League			National cup (Note: Includes Copa Uruguay, U.S. Open Cup)		League cup		Continental		Total	
Club	Season	Division	Apps	Goals	Apps	Goals	Apps	Goals	Apps	Goals	Apps	Goals
Cerro Largo	2021	Liga AUF Uruguaya	1	0	—		—		1 (Note: Appearance in Copa Sudamericana)	0	2	0
Cerro Largo	2022	Liga AUF Uruguaya	0	0	0	0	—		0	0	0	0
Cerro Largo	2023	Liga AUF Uruguaya	23	0	1	0	—		—		24	0
Cerro Largo	2024	Liga AUF Uruguaya	3	0	0	0	—		0	0	3	0
Cerro Largo	Total		27	0	1	0	0	0	1	0	29	0
Colorado Rapids 2 (loan)	2024	MLS Next Pro	13	2	1	0	—		—		14	2
Liverpool Montevideo	2025	Liga AUF Uruguaya	2	0	1	0	—		—		3	0
Liverpool Montevideo	2026	Liga AUF Uruguaya	0	0	0	0	0	0	0	0	0	0
Liverpool Montevideo	Total		2	0	1	0	0	0	0	0	3	0
Career total			42	2	3	0	0	0	1	0	46	2
