= Juan Carlos Kopriva =

Argentine footballer (born 1964)

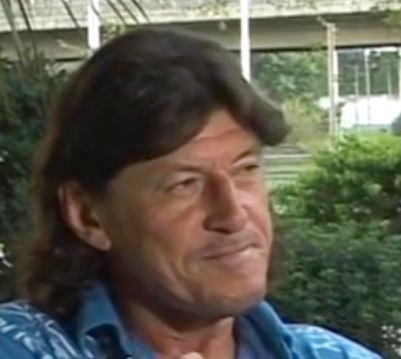
- Kopriva in 2013

Personal information
- Full name: Juan Carlos Kopriva Rivera
- Date of birth: 3 April 1964 (age 62)
- Place of birth: Resistencia, Argentina
- Position: Midfielder

Team information
- Current team: Juventud Unida SM (manager)

Senior career*
Years	Team	Apps	(Gls)
1983–1986	Deportivo Italiano		
1987	Deportivo Cuenca	24	(5)
1988–1989	Deportivo Italiano		
1990–1991	Sporting Cristal	15	(1)
1992	Deportes La Serena	21	(3)
1993	Everton	25	(6)
1994	Alianza Lima		
1995	Los Andes	24	(2)
1996	Tigre	33	(11)
1997	All Boys	7	(0)
1998–2000	Racing Montevideo	28	(1)

Managerial career
- 2000–2001: Tigre
- 2001–2003: Temperley
- 2003–2004: Sportivo Italiano
- 2005–2006: Sportivo Italiano
- 2006–2007: Deportivo Merlo
- 2007–2009: Brown de Adrogué
- 2009–2011: Barracas Central
- 2012–2015: Barracas Central
- 2016: Colegiales
- 2016: Platense
- 2017–2018: Estudiantes BA U20
- 2018: Colegiales
- 2019: Los Andes
- 2022: Argentino de Quilmes
- 2023–2025: Excursionistas
- 2026–: Juventud Unida SM
- * Club domestic league appearances and goals

Juan Carlos Kopriva Rivera (born 6 November 1964) is an Argentine football manager and former player. He is currently in charge of Juventud Unida de San Miguel. A midfielder, he played in clubs of Argentina, Chile, Ecuador, Peru and Uruguay.

== Teams player ==
- (Argentina) Deportivo Italiano 1983–1986
- (Ecuador) Deportivo Cuenca 1987
- (Argentina) Deportivo Italiano 1988–1989
- (Peru) Sporting Cristal 1990–1991
- (Chile) Deportes La Serena 1992
- (Chile) Everton de Viña del Mar 1993
- (Peru) Alianza Lima 1994
- (Argentina) Los Andes 1995
- (Argentina) Tigre 1996
- (Argentina) All Boys 1997
- (Uruguay) Racing Club de Montevideo 1998–2000

== Teams manager ==
- (Argentina) Tigre 2000–2001
- (Argentina) Temperley 2001–2003
- (Argentina) Sportivo Italiano 2003–2004
- (Argentina) Sportivo Italiano 2005–2006
- (Argentina) Deportivo Merlo 2006–2007
- (Argentina) Brown de Adrogué 2007–2009
- (Argentina) Barracas Central 2009–2011
- (Argentina) Barracas Central 2012–2015
- (Argentina) Colegiales 2016
- (Argentina) Platense 2016
- (Argentina) Estudiantes de Buenos Aires U20 2017–2018
- (Argentina) Colegiales 2018
- (Argentina) Los Andes 2019
- (Argentina) Argentino de Quilmes 2022
- (Argentina) Excursionistas 2023–2025
- (Argentina) Juventud Unida de San Miguel 2026–
