= Facundo Silvera (footballer, born 2001) =

Uruguayan association football player

Personal information
- Full name: Facundo Ezequiel Silvera Andreoli
- Date of birth: 18 November 2001 (age 25)
- Place of birth: Canelones, Uruguay
- Height: 1.72 m (5 ft 8 in)
- Position: Midfielder

Team information
- Current team: Miramar Misiones
- Number: 24

Youth career
- Danubio

Senior career*
Years	Team	Apps	(Gls)
2019–2024	Danubio	55	(1)
2024	→ Miramar Misiones (loan)	21	(1)
2025–	Miramar Misiones	1	(0)
- * Club domestic league appearances and goals as of 2 February 2025

Facundo Ezequiel Silvera Andreoli (born 18 November 2001) is a Uruguayan professional footballer who plays as a midfielder for Miramar Misiones.

== Career ==
Silvera is a youth academy graduate of Danubio. He made his professional debut for the club on 5 October 2019 in a 1–1 draw against River Plate Montevideo.

Silvera is a Uruguayan youth international. He was formerly a member of Uruguay under-20 team.

== Career statistics ==
As of 24 October 2022

Appearances and goals by club, season and competition
Club	Season	League			Cup		Continental		Total	
Club	Season	Division	Apps	Goals	Apps	Goals	Apps	Goals	Apps	Goals
Danubio	2019	Uruguayan Primera División	1	0	—		0	0	1	0
Danubio	2020	Uruguayan Primera División	14	0	—		—		14	0
Danubio	2021	Uruguayan Segunda División	13	0	—		—		13	0
Danubio	2022	Uruguayan Primera División	15	1	1	0	—		16	1
Career total			43	1	1	0	0	0	44	1
