= Lucas Poletto (footballer, born 1994) =

Argentine professional footballer

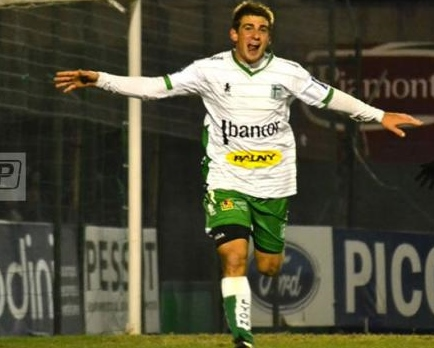

Personal information
- Full name: Lucas Manuel Poletto
- Date of birth: 20 June 1994 (age 32)
- Place of birth: Suardi, Argentina
- Height: 1.78 m (5 ft 10 in)
- Positions: Midfielder; forward

Youth career
- Sportivo Suardi

Senior career*
Years	Team	Apps	(Gls)
2009–2014	Sportivo Suardi		
2014–2017	Sportivo Belgrano	35	(1)
2017–2019	Deportivo Morón	5	(0)
2018–2019	→ Colegiales (loan)	29	(1)
2019	Estudiantes	5	(0)
2020	Aspropyrgos	7	(1)
- * Club domestic league appearances and goals as of 22:29, 21 December 2020 (UTC)

Lucas Manuel Poletto (born 20 June 1994) is an Argentine professional footballer who plays as a midfielder or forward.

== Career ==
Poletto started his career with local team Sportivo Suardi, appearing in Liga San Francisco from the age of fifteen. In 2014, Sportivo Belgrano signed Poletto. He began featuring in the 2015 Primera B Nacional, appearing for his professional debut on 5 April during a 1–1 home draw with Estudiantes. He scored his first goal in the succeeding June against Ferro Carril Oeste, in a season that concluded with relegation to Torneo Federal A. One goal in twenty-two matches followed in tier three, before the player left in July 2017 to Deportivo Morón. He played five times in 2017–18 as they placed eleventh under Walter Otta.

On 9 July 2018, Poletto joined Primera B Metropolitana side Colegiales on loan. His first goal arrived in a fixture versus Justo José de Urquiza in April 2019, in the midst of thirty-one total appearances for them as they reached the play-offs; losing out to San Telmo. In July 2019, Poletto left Deportivo Morón permanently to sign with Torneo Federal A's Estudiantes; the opponents of his career debut. After five matches in the third tier, Poletto moved abroad for the first time as he penned terms with Football League Greece outfit Aspropyrgos ahead of January 2020. He scored his first goal for the club on 7 March versus Ialysos.

== Career statistics ==
As of 21 December 2020.

Appearances and goals by club, season and competition
Club	Season	League			Cup		League Cup		Continental		Other		Total	
Club	Season	Division	Apps	Goals	Apps	Goals	Apps	Goals	Apps	Goals	Apps	Goals	Apps	Goals
Sportivo Belgrano	2014	Primera B Nacional	0	0	0	0	—		—		0	0	0	0
Sportivo Belgrano	2015	Primera B Nacional	19	1	0	0	—		—		0	0	19	1
Sportivo Belgrano	2016	Torneo Federal A	2	0	0	0	—		—		4 (Note: Appearance(s) in the Torneo Federal A play-offs)	1	6	1
Sportivo Belgrano	2016–17	Torneo Federal A	14	0	0	0	—		—		2	0	16	0
Sportivo Belgrano	Total		35	1	0	0	—		—		6	1	41	2
Deportivo Morón	2017–18	Primera B Nacional	5	0	0	0	—		—		0	0	5	0
Deportivo Morón	2018–19	Primera B Nacional	0	0	0	0	—		—		0	0	0	0
Deportivo Morón	Total		5	0	0	0	—		—		0	0	5	0
Colegiales (loan)	2018–19	Primera B Metropolitana	29	1	0	0	—		—		2 (Note: Appearance(s) in the Primera B Metropolitana play-offs)	0	31	1
Estudiantes	2019–20	Torneo Federal A	5	0	0	0	—		—		0	0	5	0
Aspropyrgos	2019–20	Football League	6	1	0	0	—		—		0	0	6	1
Career total			80	3	0	0	—		—		8	1	88	4
