= Lucas Poletto (footballer, born 1995) =

Brazilian footballer

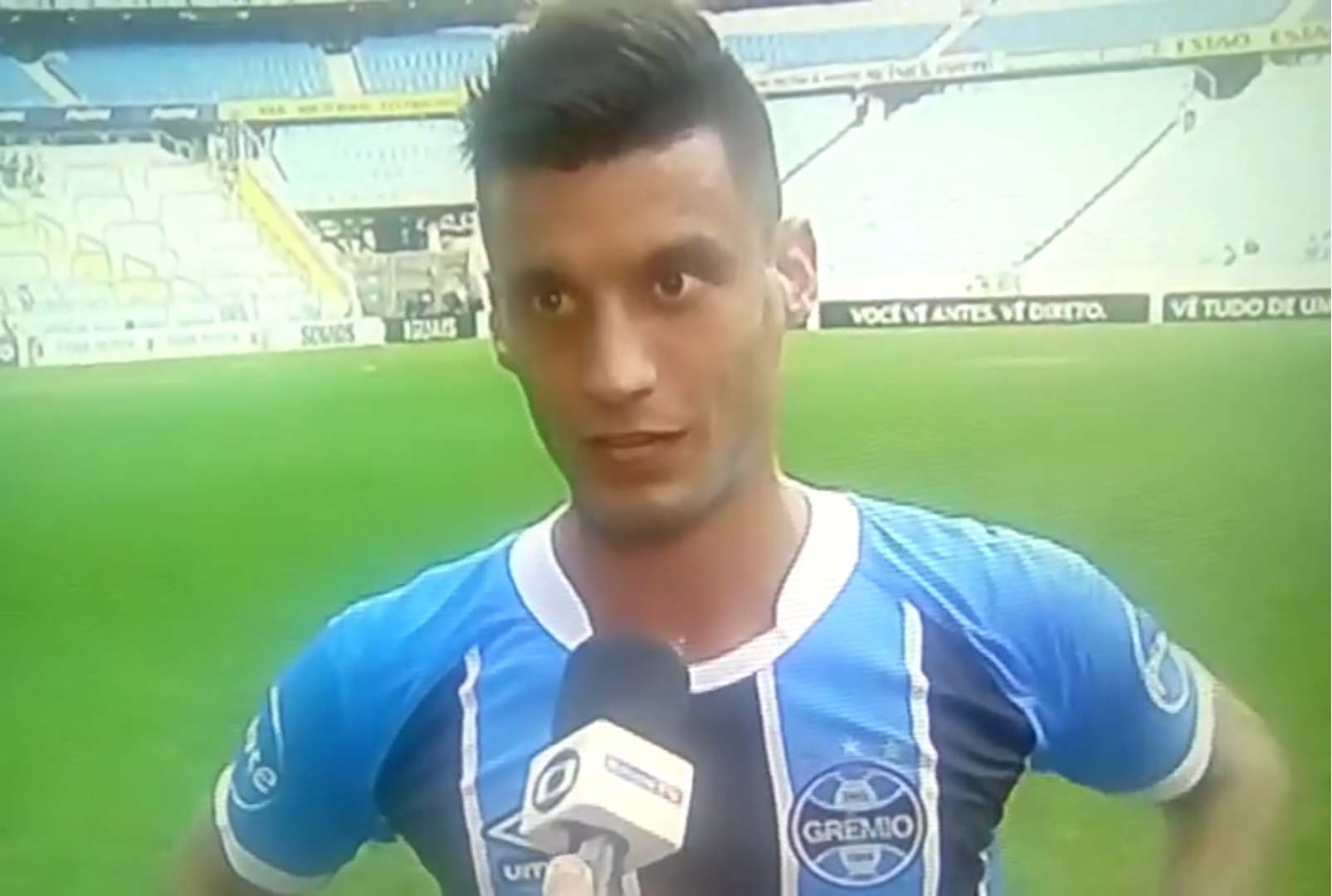
- Poletto during an interview

Personal information
- Full name: Lucas Poletto Costa
- Date of birth: 29 March 1995 (age 31)
- Place of birth: Belo Horizonte, Brazil
- Height: 1.81 m (5 ft 11 in)
- Position: Forward

Team information
- Current team: Niki Volos
- Number: 7

Youth career
- 2009–2012: Internacional
- 2012–2013: Milan
- 2013–2015: Figueirense
- 2016–2017: Santos

Senior career*
| Years | Team | Apps | (Gls) |
| 2017–2018 | Grêmio | 3 | (1) |
| 2018–2019 | Apollon Larissa | 24 | (3) |
| 2019–2020 | Xanthi | 1 | (0) |
| 2020 | → Levadiakos (loan) | 9 | (2) |
| 2020–2022 | Levadiakos | 57 | (14) |
| 2022 | Criciúma | 7 | (0) |
| 2023 | Brusque | 26 | (0) |
| 2023–2024 | Levadiakos | 22 | (3) |
| 2024–2025 | Panachaiki | 10 | (2) |
| 2025 | Kifisia | 9 | (0) |
| 2025–2026 | Anagennisi Karditsa | 23 | (5) |
| 2026– | Niki Volos | 0 | (0) |
- * Club domestic league appearances and goals as of 20 April 2026

Lucas Poletto Costa (born 29 March 1995) is a Brazilian professional footballer who plays as a forward for Greek Super League 2 club Niki Volos.

== Career ==
Born in Belo Horizonte, Poletto represented Internacional, Figueirense and Italian club Milan as a youth before moving to Santos B in early 2016. Although he was registered for the Copa Paulista tournament, he did not get any playing time.

On 13 April 2017, Poletto signed with Grêmio. He made his first team debut on 19 November, replacing Dionathã in a 1–0 defeat against Santos FC in Série A. 7 days later, he scored the equaliser in a 1–1 draw against Atlético Goianiense from a Rafael Thyere. On 5 January 2018, Poletto's contract was extended till June. On 12 July, he was released by the club.

On 15 September 2018, Poletto moved abroad and joined Greek Football League club Apollon Larissa. On 22 November 2018, he scored his first goal for the club in an astonishing 4–3 away win against Iraklis. Three days later he scored with a beautiful finesse shot in a 2–0 home win against Aittitos Spata, which cemented his team's position on top of the league table. On 19 January 2019, he scored the equalizer in a 1–1 home draw against Volos.

On 12 June 2019, he signed a contract with top tier club Xanthi.

== Career statistics ==
As of match played on 12 June 2019

| Club | Season | League | | | State League | | Cup | | Total | |
| Club | Season | Division | Apps | Goals | Apps | Goals | Apps | Goals | Apps | Goals |
|---|---|---|---|---|---|---|---|---|---|---|
| Grêmio | 2017 | Série A | 3 | 1 | 0 | 0 | 0 | 0 | 3 | 1 |
| Grêmio | 2018 | Série A | 0 | 0 | 1 | 0 | 0 | 0 | 1 | 0 |
| Grêmio | Total | | 3 | 1 | 1 | 0 | 0 | 0 | 4 | 1 |
| Apollon Larissa | 2018–19 | Football League | 24 | 3 | — | | 0 | 0 | 24 | 3 |
| Career total | | | 27 | 4 | 1 | 0 | 0 | 0 | 28 | 4 |

== Honours ==
Levadiakos

- Super League 2: 2021–22, 2023–24

A.E. Kifisia

- Super League 2: 2024–25

Gremio

- Campeonato Gaúcho: 2018
