= Club Atlético Colegiales (Argentina) =

Association football club in Argentina

Colegiales
- Full name: Club Atlético Colegiales
- Nicknames: Tricolor; Cole
- Founded: 1 April 1908; 117 years ago
- Ground: Estadio Libertarios Unidos, Florida Oeste
- Capacity: 8,500
- Chairman: Tomás Costa
- Manager: Leonardo Fernández
- League: Primera Nacional
- 2025: 9th of Zona A
- Website: cacolegiales.ar
Home colours	Away colours

Club Atlético Colegiales is an Argentine football club located in Florida Oeste, a district in Vicente López Partido.

The team currently plays in Primera Nacional, the second division of the Argentine football league system, after several seasons playing in Primera B Metropolitana.

== History ==
=== The beginning ===
The club was founded on 1 April 1908, in Buenos Aires by a group of anarchists who discussed fighting for better conditions for the working class. That was the reason that originated its first name, "Club Atlético Libertarios Unidos", naming José Garrone as its first president. The colors adopted were red with a horizontal black stripe paying tribute to their anarchist ideology.

Libertarios Unidos' first field was placed just beside the Defensores de Belgrano stadium, in the corner of Blandengues and Manzanares streets of Buenos Aires. Libertarios Unidos was soon forced to change its name, because the government had prohibited any anarchist expression (some sources state that it was the Police Chief Ramón Falcón himself who obliged them to change the name). So the club was renamed as Sportivo del Norte in 1919.

=== 1920 decade ===
Sportivo del Norte obtained the promotion to Primera B in 1919 and one year later, the team was playing its first match in Primera División, where it finished 8th. In 1924 Sportivo had to leave its field in Blandengues and Manzanares, moving to Colegiales district. The club soon renamed honoring its new home, changing not only its name to "Club Atlético Colegiales" (in 1925) but its uniform colors, which became blue, red and gold. They have remained the club colors up to present days.

In 1926, Colegiales registered to dissident body, Asociación Amateurs de Football (AAmF) where the team made a good campaign with a squad nicknamed "Los Fenómenos (The Phenomenons)" due to the skilled players that formed it. Most frequently line-up was: Tauzlet; Rossi, Tachini; Del Corro, Machiavello, Alberico; Martínez, Toscano, Giudice, Granara Costa, Paduano.

Nevertheless, when both leagues merged at the end of the 1926 season, six AAmF teams were disaffiliated (with Colegiales among them) and all their matches annulled. As a result, those clubs were sent to the second division, named "Primera División-Sección B".

In 1928, Colegiales won the second division championship promoting to Primera División. The line-up was: Santiago Sesana; Rossi, Silva; Del Corro, Pausini, Felipelli; Martínez, Toscano, Giudice, González, Coviello.

=== 1930–56 ===
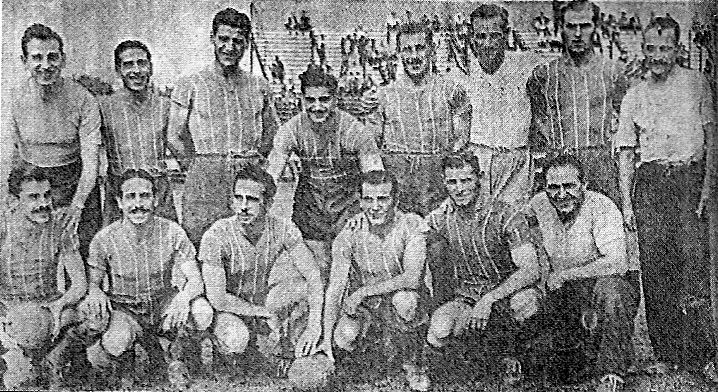
The 1947 team that won the Primera C (then "Primera Amateur") title.

Colegiales had a poor campaign in 1930 and was relegated to Liga Amateur, where the team finished 2nd (after Sportivo Barracas in 1932. Some restructuring in Argentine football relegated Colegiales to the second division. By then the club had moved again, establishing its new home in Fraga and Estomba streets and soon after the club moved to Villa Martelli.

In 1944 Colegiales was relegated to the third division (now Primera C). After two consecutive seasons finishing 2nd, the team finally won the 1947 championship. The team went through the season unbeaten, with 77 goals scored (an average of 3 per game) and only 23 goals conceded. During that year Colegiales played its home games in different venues so the club had forced to move from Villa Martelli. The champion line-up was: Incardona; A. Dardenne, Arrillaga; F. Baloira, Auad, Céspedes; Coudannes, A. Baloira, Cantamessi, Archero, E. Dardenne.

In 1948 the club moved to its current sports field of Antonio Malaver and Gervasio Posadas streets in Florida Oeste, Buenos Aires. A new restructuring in Argentine football relegated Colegiales to a lower division, until 6 January 1956, when the squad won another title when defeated Los Andes 1–0. Coached by Guido Ugobono, the line-up for that match was: Negri; Álvarez, Cosentino; Pérez, Aragón, Cappano; Fassani, Morales, López, Tognola, Vecino (who scored the goal). But Colegiales only lasted one season in Primera B, so the team was relegated again in 1956.

=== 1957–present ===
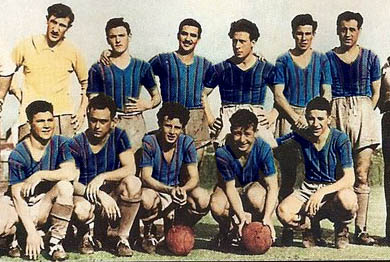
Colegiales won its second championship in 1955.

Colegiales returned to Primera B after winning the 1992–93 title, defeating Argentino de Quilmes 1–0 in the last game. The team was coached by Rubén Moreno. Colegiales only lasted one season so in 1994 the team was relegated to Primera C again although Cole would return a year later, after winning the Torneo Reducido. Colegiales remained in the division until the team was relegated to Primera C in 2001.

In 2002 the team reached the finals to promote to the upper division but was defeated by Deportivo Laferrere. The next year Colegiales finally got the promotion after beating Villa Dálmine, although the club was punished by the riot caused by its supporters in a match against Tigre. The Argentine Football Association punished Colegiales deducting 9 points to the team, therefore it was relegated to a lower division at the end of the season.

In 2008 Colegiales promoted to Primera B when beating Justo José de Urquiza. Colegiales made a great campaign in that division, reaching the finals against Deportivo Merlo (which finally promoted to Primera B Nacional). In 2011 Colegiales took part in the relaunched Copa Argentina (which had not been played since 1931) being defeated by Independiente 4–0 in the first stage.

In November 2024, Colegiales returned to the second division of Argentine football after crowning champion of Primera B Metropolitana. Colegiales (which had previously won the 2024 Clausura) defeated Los Andes (winner of Torneo Apertura) 2–0 on aggregate to secure their place in the 2025 Primera Nacional.

== Colors and uniform ==
The first team jersey was red with a black stripe, taking the colors that identified the anarchistic movement. In 1924, the current three-colored uniform of blue, red and yellow was finally adopted and this combination has remained until now.

== Stadium ==
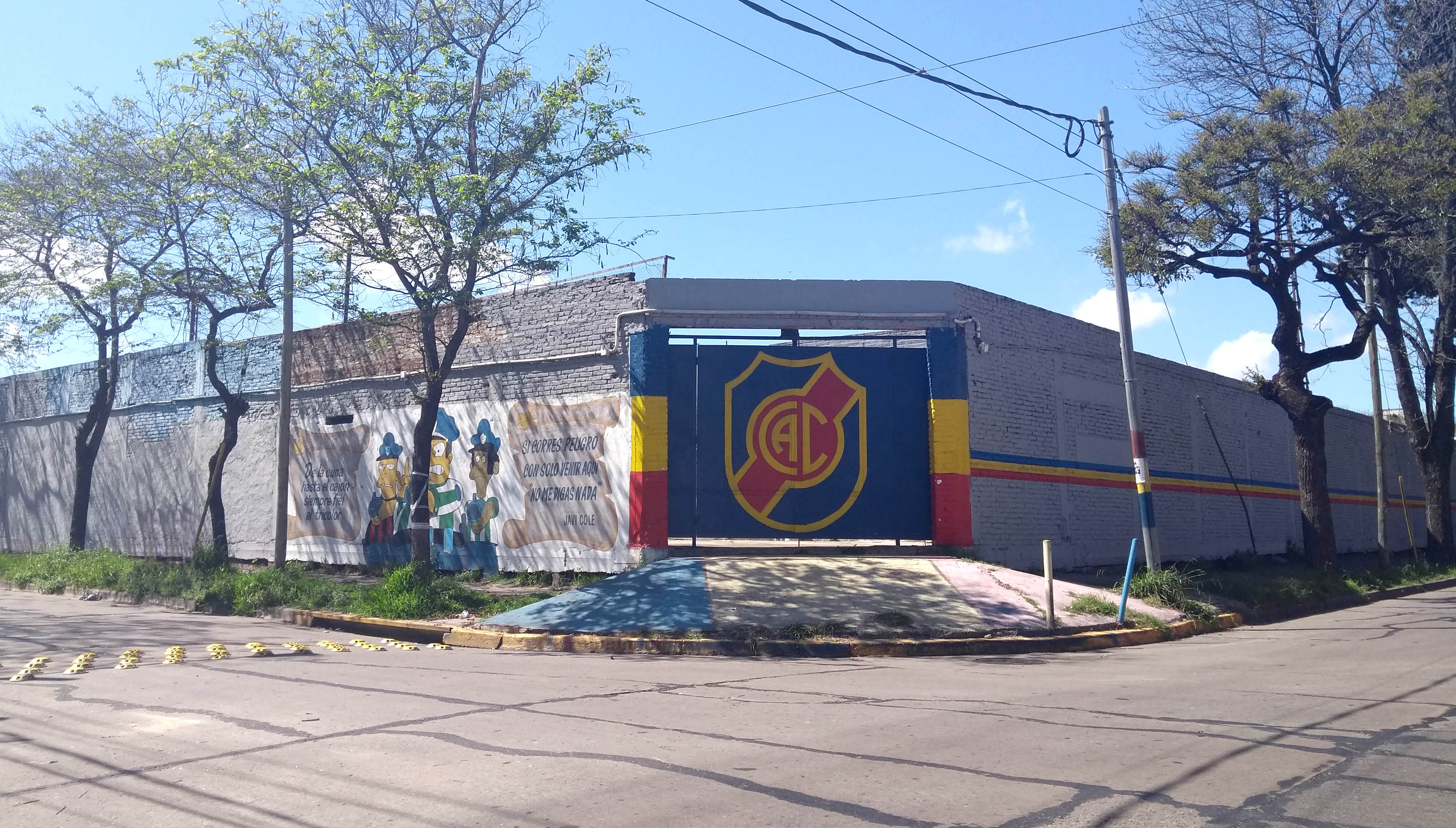
Stadium's entrance on Malaver street

The club currently plays at "Libertarios Unidos" stadium, sited in Antonio Malaver and Gervasio Posadas streets in Florida Oeste, Vicente López Partido, since 1948. As time went by, Colegiales played its home games in diverse stadiums, most of them situated in the city of Buenos Aires: the first in Blandengues y Manzanares streets (1908), then in Teodoro García and Giribone streets in Colegiales neighbourhood (1924), and the last in Fraga and Estomba streets (1941). In 1948 Colegiales moved to Villa Martelli (another district in the same partido), where hosted a brief time previously to the move to Florida Oeste where the club has remained since then.

After Colegiales promoted to Primera B Metro in 1993, the club built its first and only seated grandstands with capacity for 500 people. In 2005 the stadium increased its capacity to 8,500 after a new grandstand was built, naming it "Tribuna Libertarios Unidos". The field dimensions are 92 m (101 yd) long by 65 m (71 yd) wide.

== Players ==
=== Current squad ===
Note: Flags indicate national team as defined under FIFA eligibility rules; some limited exceptions apply. Players may hold more than one non-FIFA nationality.

No.	Pos.	Nation	Player
1	GK	ARG	Marcos Yamil Jara
2	DF	ARG	Germán Mendoza
3	DF	ARG	Gonzalo Torres
4	DF	ARG	Lucas Faggioli
5	MF	ARG	Gastón Mansilla
6	DF	ARG	Claudio Verino
7	MF	ARG	Héctor Buzzi
8	FW	ARG	Juan Manuel Tolosa
9	FW	ARG	Franco Toloza
10	FW	ARG	Cristian Vergara
11	MF	ARG	Facundo Stable
12	GK	ARG	Nicolás Angellotti
13	GK	ARG	Milton Álvarez
14	DF	ARG	Matías Muñoz
15	MF	ARG	Franco González

No.	Pos.	Nation	Player
16	FW	ARG	Lucas Poletto
17	MF	ARG	Elías Borrego
18	GK	ARG	Gastón Molina
19	MF	ARG	Gonzálo Torres
20	MF	ARG	Tobías Moriceau
21	DF	ARG	Diego Magallanes
22	DF	ARG	Santiago Tallarico
23	DF	ARG	Esteban Giambuzzi
24	DF	ARG	Facundo Nasif
25	DF	ARG	Brian Medina
26	MF	ARG	Alejandro Cuevas
27	MF	ARG	Franco Gómez
31	MF	ARG	Diego Chávez
32	DF	ARG	Nahuel Amarilla

== Honours ==
- Primera B (2): 1928, 2024
- Primera C (7): 1913, 1914, 1947, 1955, 1992–93, 2002–03, 2007–08
