= Club Almirante Brown =

Argentine sports club

Almirante Brown
- Full name: Club Almirante Brown
- Nicknames: Fragata; Mirasol; Aurinegro
- Founded: 1 July 1912; 114 years ago
- Ground: Estadio Fragata Presidente Sarmiento. Jose Mármol 5400 & José Ignacio Rucci CP 1754 San Justo Argentina
- Capacity: 25,000
- Chairman: Maximiliano Levy
- Manager: Rodrigo Alonso
- League: Primera Nacional
- 2025: Primera Nacional Zone B, 14th of 18
- Website: almirantebrown.org.ar
Home colours	Away colours	Third colours

Club Almirante Brown (mostly known simply as Almirante Brown) is an Argentine sports club headquartered in the San Justo district of La Matanza Partido, in Greater Buenos Aires.

Although other sports are practised at the club, Almirante Brown is mostly known for its football team, which currently plays in the Primera B Nacional, the 2nd division of the Argentine football league system. The football stadium, names Frigate President Sarmiento, is situated at the westernmost part of San Justo, marking the transition with the nearby town of Casanova, and shares the same postal codes as San Justo (1754), district of the same partido. Almirante Brown has also a women's association football section.

Apart from football, other sports and activities hosted by the institution are tennis, field hockey and futsal.

== History ==
=== The two foundations ===
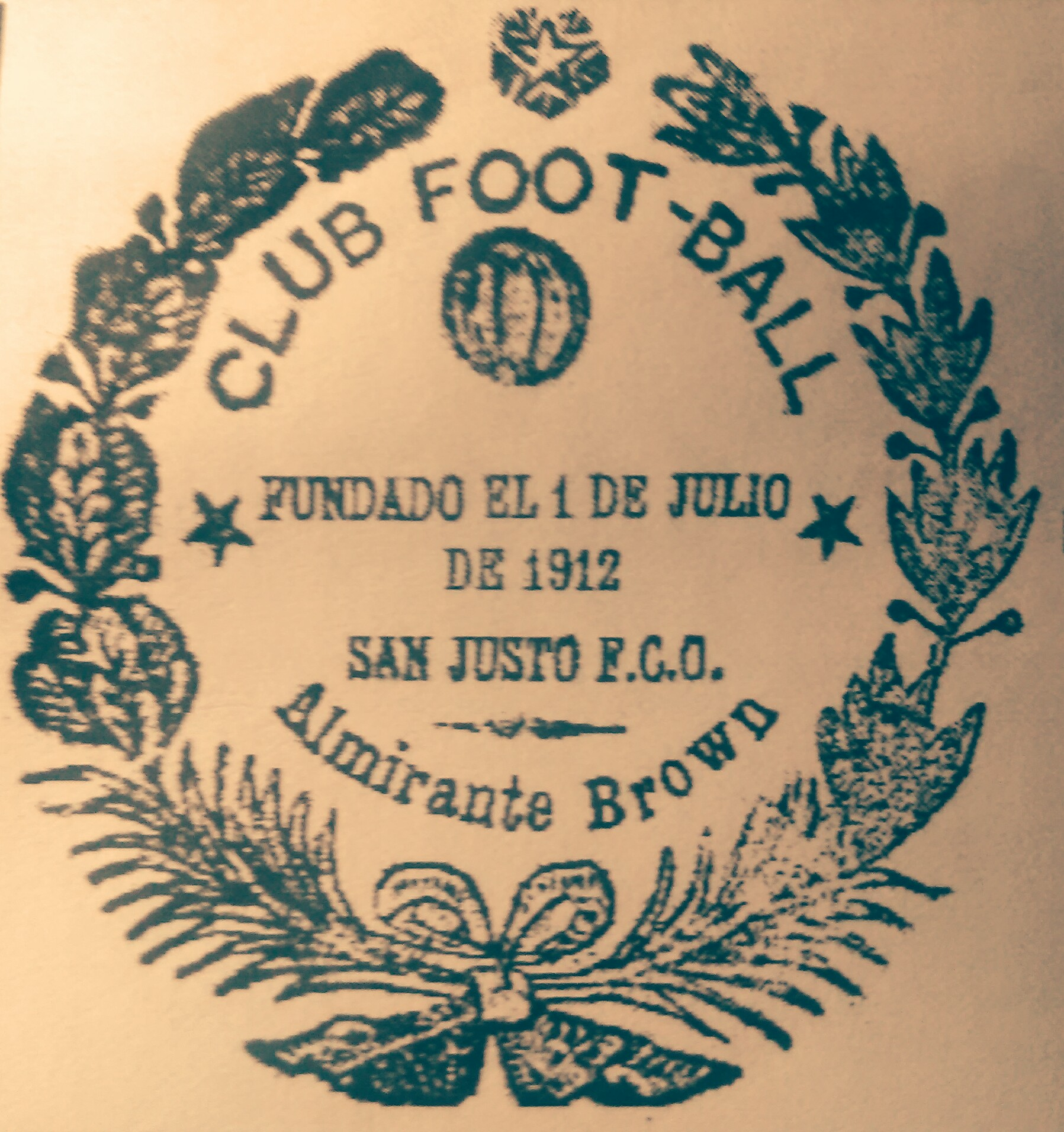
First seal of the club, 1912

The club was founded on 1 July 1912 as "Club Atlético Almirante Brown". The first uniform kit acquired by the club were the striped black and yellow worn by Uruguayan CURCC (predecessor of current club Peñarol), that were the only available in stores.

On 21 March 1915 the club changed its name to "Almirante Brown Athletic Club" and one year later it affiliated to Amateur Football Association where the team took part of Tercera de Ascenso, the last division of Argentine football league system. It only lasted one season so the club would be inactive since 1919.

In 1921, four dissident members of neighbor club Huracán de San Justo met with some former members of old club Almirante Brown with the purpose of reestablishing the institution. It was finally set up on 17 January 1922 as "Centro Atlético Almirante Brown", being named Segundo Boragno as president of the club. He managed the club until his death in June 1930.

=== First years ===
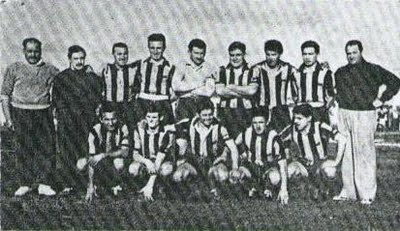
The squad that won its first official title in 1956

Almirante Brown played football in several regional leagues, winning the first cup in 1926. In 1929 the team won the La Matanza Partido league (named "Copa Adrián Beccar Varela" honoring former president of the Association). In 1931 Almirante Brown acquired the right to participate in the Amateur Argentina de Football to Club Almafuerte (based in Parque Patricios, Buenos Aires), wearing the same name and colors of the "porteño" club. In 1932 and 1933 the club also took part of the championship.

In 1934 the club was noticed that another institution of Adrogué, also named "Almirante Brown", had disaffiliated from the Association. In an assembly held short later, the club decided to return to tournaments using its original name and colors but Almirante Brown was not allowed to take part due to there was no place for new teams. Therefore, the club began a long period of inactivity that extended to 1942, when some young people from Club Juventud Unida promoted the re-opening of the club Almirante Brown. This was finally formalised in April 1942 with the merger of both institutions.

=== Expansion ===
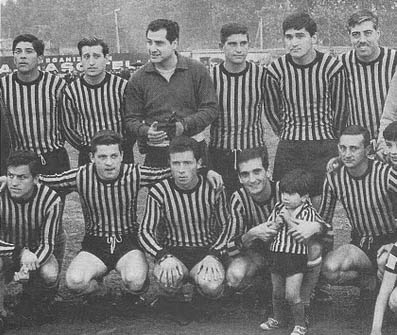
Almirante Brown, 1965 Primera C champion

The club affiliated to the Association again, winning two championships and being designed as Buenos Aires Province representative to play the Argentine Amateur championship held in Cañada de Gómez. During the decade of 1940 Almirante Brown also acquired a land to build its headquarters in San Justo. In 1956 the club affiliated to Argentine Football Association filling the vacant left by defunct Deportivo San Justo, merged to Almirante Brown.

In 1956 Almirante made its debut at "Tercera de Ascenso", the fourth division of the league system (current Primera D), winning its first official title that same season. The roster was formed by Juan Gallino, Ándres Bosco, Segundo Boragno, Claudio Iobbi, Pedro Ángel Costa, Juan Carlos Zoppi, Oscar Villalba, Quirino Toledano, Julio César Berrutti, Onofre, Carlos Dante Juárez, Aramburu, Alejandro Harguinteguy, Ricardo Varío, Juan Carlos Hernández and A. González. The coach was Ángel Martínez

Almirante Brown got promotion to play at "Segunda División de Ascenso" (current Primera C) where it remained until 1965 when the team won its second title promoting to Primera B Metropolitana. The team totalized 54 points in 34 games played, having won 23 and lost only 3. The squad scored 68 goals and received only 28. Some of the players were Oscar Cadars, E. Ibarra, Miguel Cervello, Roberto Álvarez, Juan Carlos Ronchi, Andrade, Risso, Montero, Vicente Monteagudo, Roberto Emilio Migliore, Horacio Darío Onzari, Orlando Sicca, G. Kopiska, Palma, Federczuk, F. Ruffa, Juan Carlos Faedda, O. Grela, José Benigno Sanez, N. Montero, Risso, De Masi, Osvaldo Guenzatti, Alberto Violi, Francisco Sánchez, Alfredo Martínez, Diego Zavaleta, R. Román, Leiga, H. García, R. Lázaro, Umbert and Villarino, all of them coached by Marcos Busico. On 29 July 1967 the club was renamed "Club Almirante Brown", which has remained since.

In 1986 the Association made a restructuring of the lower divisions, creating the Primera B Nacional that became the second division. Almirante Brown did not qualify to play in the recently created league, remaining in Primera B Metropolitana that became the third division after the restructuring. The team was near to promote to Primera División in 1991–92 season when it played the final with San Martín de Tucumán, which finally won the series promoting to the top division of Argentine football.

In 1998 Almirante was relegated to Primera B Metropolitana, returning to the second division in July 2007, after defeating Estudiantes de Buenos Aires 1–0 at Racing Club stadium in Avellaneda. During the match, Almirante Brown supporters throw a bomb to the field, that caused player Cáceres and Cubito lost consciousness. Immediately after that, a big struggle was started by Almirante Brown supporters, throwing seats and other objects to the other part of the attendance.

== Players ==
=== Current roster ===
As of 8 June 2022

Note: Flags indicate national team as defined under FIFA eligibility rules; some limited exceptions apply. Players may hold more than one non-FIFA nationality.

No.	Pos.	Nation	Player
—	GK	ARG	Nicolas Forastiero (loan from Argentinos)
—	GK	PAR	Manuel Peralta
—	GK	ARG	Ramiro Martínez
—	DF	ARG	Rodrigo Alonso
—	DF	ARG	Agustín Dattola
—	DF	ARG	Ramiro Fernández
—	DF	ARG	Leonardo Flores (loan from Banfield)
—	DF	ARG	Joel Ghiraldello
—	DF	ARG	Brian Medina
—	DF	ARG	Facundo Miño
—	DF	ARG	Gastón Montero
—	DF	ARG	Ian Rasso (loan from Vélez)
—	DF	ARG	Cristian Varela
—	DF	ARG	Christian Moreno
—	MF	ARG	Marcos Brítez
—	DF	ARG	Diego García
—	DF	ARG	José Luis García

No.	Pos.	Nation	Player
—	MF	ARG	Leandro Guzmán
—	MF	ARG	Ariel Lucero (loan from All Boys)
—	MF	ARG	Patricio Núñez (loan from Lanús)
—	MF	ARG	Gastón Scisci
—	MF	ARG	Marcelo Vega
—	MF	ARG	Rodrigo Vélez
—	FW	ARG	Milton Céliz
—	FW	ARG	Cristian Chávez (loan from Independiente)
—	FW	ARG	Ignacio Colombini
—	FW	ARG	Norman Díaz (loan from Lanús)
—	FW	ARG	Víctor Gómez
—	FW	ARG	Nicolás Luján
—	FW	ARG	Juan Manuel Martínez
—	FW	ARG	Florián Monzón (loan from Vélez)
—	FW	ARG	Mateo Piteo
—	FW	ARG	Ángel Stringa
—	FW	ARG	Joaquín Taborda

== Out on loan ==
Note: Flags indicate national team as defined under FIFA eligibility rules; some limited exceptions apply. Players may hold more than one non-FIFA nationality.

No.	Pos.	Nation	Player

== Honours ==
=== National ===
- Primera B Metropolitana (3): 2006–07, 2009–10, 2020
- Primera División C (1): 1965
- Tercera de Ascenso (1): 1956
