= 2025 Primera Nacional =

41st season of the second-tier football league in Argentina

Primera Nacional
- Season: 2025
- Dates: 6 February – 30 November 2025
- Champions: Gimnasia y Esgrima (M) (1st title)
- Promoted: Gimnasia y Esgrima (M); Estudiantes (RC)
- Relegated: Arsenal; Alvarado; Talleres (RdE); Defensores Unidos
- Matches: 633
- Goals: 1,132 (1.79 per match)
- Top goalscorer: Alejandro Gagliardi (18 goals)
- Biggest home win: Arsenal 5–0 Alvarado (4 October)
- Biggest away win: San Telmo 0–3 Def. de Belgrano (23 February); Def. Unidos 0–3 Gimnasia y Esgrima (J) (16 March); San Telmo 0–3 Temperley (5 April); Temperley 0–3 Chacarita Juniors (13 April); Chacarita Juniors 0–3 Chaco For Ever (4 May); Chacarita Juniors 0–3 Estudiantes (BA) (3 August); San Martín (T) 0–3 Arsenal (31 August); Atlanta 0–3 Deportivo Maipú (4 October)
- Highest scoring: Estudiantes (BA) 5–2 Almirante Brown (15 February); Central Norte 3–4 Colón (20 July); Arsenal 5–2 San Miguel (27 July)

The 2025 Argentine Primera Nacional, officially known as the Campeonato de Primera Nacional Sur Finanzas 2025 for sponsorship purposes, was the 41st season of the Primera Nacional, the second-tier competition of Argentine football. Thirty-six teams competed in the league, thirty-three of which took part in the 2024 season, along with one team promoted from Torneo Federal A and two teams promoted from Primera B Metropolitana. The season began on 6 February and ended on 30 November 2025, and the fixture draw was held on 20 December 2024.

Gimnasia y Esgrima de Mendoza were the champions, winning their first title in the competition as well as achieving promotion to the AFA Liga Profesional de Fútbol after defeating Deportivo Madryn on penalties following a 1–1 draw after extra time in the championship final. The other team that promoted to the top flight at the end of the season was Estudiantes de Río Cuarto, who won the Torneo Reducido after defeating Deportivo Madryn in the finals by a 3–1 aggregate score.

== Format ==
For this season, the competition was played under the same format as the previous season, with the thirty-six participating teams split into two zones of 18 teams, where they played against the other teams in their group twice: once at home and once away. However, since this season had two teams less than the previous one as no teams were relegated from Primera División, no interzonal matches between rival teams were played, although rival sides were still paired together for the season draw and drawn into different zones. Both zone winners played a final match on neutral ground to decide the first promoted team to the top flight for the following season, while the teams placed from second to eighth place in each zone played a knockout tournament (Torneo Reducido) for the second promotion berth along with the loser of the final between the zone winners. Moreover, the playoff match between the sides placing second-from-bottom in each group was not played this season, and instead four teams were relegated to the third-tier leagues, those being the bottom two teams from each zone.

Similar to previous seasons, fifteen Primera Nacional teams qualified for the 2026 Copa Argentina through league performance, those being the top seven teams of each zone plus the best eighth-placed one.

== Club information ==
=== Stadia and locations ===
Locations of the 2025 Primera Nacional teams outside Greater Buenos Aires.
Locations of the 2025 Primera Nacional teams within Greater Buenos Aires.

Club	City	Province	Stadium	Capacity
Agropecuario Argentino	Carlos Casares	Buenos Aires	Ofelia Rosenzuaig	8,000
All Boys	Buenos Aires	Capital Federal	Islas Malvinas	12,199
Almagro	José Ingenieros	Buenos Aires	Tres de Febrero	12,500
Almirante Brown	Isidro Casanova	Buenos Aires	Fragata Presidente Sarmiento	25,000
Alvarado	Mar del Plata	Buenos Aires	José María Minella	35,180
Arsenal	Sarandí	Buenos Aires	Julio Humberto Grondona	16,300
Atlanta	Buenos Aires	Capital Federal	Don León Kolbowski	14,000
Central Norte	Salta	Salta	Padre Ernesto Martearena	20,408
Chacarita Juniors	Villa Maipú	Buenos Aires	Chacarita Juniors	19,000
Chaco For Ever	Resistencia	Chaco	Juan Alberto García	23,000
Colegiales	Florida Oeste	Buenos Aires	Libertarios Unidos	6,500
Colón	Santa Fe	Santa Fe	Brigadier Estanislao López	40,000
Defensores de Belgrano	Buenos Aires	Capital Federal	Juan Pasquale	9,000
Defensores Unidos	Zárate	Buenos Aires	Mario Lossino	6,000
Deportivo Madryn	Puerto Madryn	Chubut	Abel Sastre	8,000
Deportivo Maipú	Maipú	Mendoza	Omar Higinio Sperdutti	8,000
Deportivo Morón	Morón	Buenos Aires	Nuevo Francisco Urbano	32,000
Estudiantes	Caseros	Buenos Aires	Ciudad de Caseros	16,740
Estudiantes	Río Cuarto	Córdoba	Antonio Candini	15,000
Ferro Carril Oeste	Buenos Aires	Capital Federal	Ricardo Etcheverri	24,442
Gimnasia y Esgrima	Jujuy	Jujuy	23 de Agosto	23,200
Gimnasia y Esgrima	Mendoza	Mendoza	Víctor Legrotaglie	11,500
Gimnasia y Tiro	Salta	Salta	Gigante del Norte	24,300
Güemes	Santiago del Estero	Santiago del Estero	Arturo Miranda	15,000
Los Andes	Lomas de Zamora	Buenos Aires	Eduardo Gallardón	38,000
Mitre	Santiago del Estero	Santiago del Estero	José y Antonio Castiglione	10,500
Nueva Chicago	Buenos Aires	Capital Federal	Nueva Chicago	28,500
Patronato	Paraná	Entre Ríos	Presbítero Bartolomé Grella	22,000
Quilmes	Quilmes	Buenos Aires	Centenario	35,200
Racing	Córdoba	Córdoba	Miguel Sancho	15,000
San Martín	Tucumán	Tucumán	La Ciudadela	30,250
San Miguel	Los Polvorines	Buenos Aires	Malvinas Argentinas	7,176
San Telmo	Dock Sud	Buenos Aires	Osvaldo Baletto	2,000
Talleres	Remedios de Escalada	Buenos Aires	Pablo Comelli	16,000
Temperley	Temperley	Buenos Aires	Alfredo Beranger	13,000
Tristán Suárez	Tristán Suárez	Buenos Aires	20 de Octubre	15,000

== Zone A ==
=== Standings ===
Pos	Team	Pld	W	D	L	GF	GA	GD	Pts	Qualification or relegation
1	Deportivo Madryn	34	16	12	6	45	28	+17	60	Advance to Final and qualification for Copa Argentina
2	Atlanta	34	14	13	7	31	28	+3	55	Advance to Torneo Reducido and qualification for Copa Argentina
3	Tristán Suárez	34	12	16	6	33	23	+10	52	Advance to Torneo Reducido and qualification for Copa Argentina
4	Gimnasia y Tiro	34	13	12	9	34	23	+11	51	Advance to Torneo Reducido and qualification for Copa Argentina
5	San Miguel	34	12	14	8	32	28	+4	50	Advance to Torneo Reducido and qualification for Copa Argentina
6	San Martín (T)	34	12	13	9	32	29	+3	49	Advance to Torneo Reducido and qualification for Copa Argentina
7	Deportivo Maipú	34	12	12	10	34	30	+4	48	Advance to Torneo Reducido and qualification for Copa Argentina
8	Patronato	34	12	12	10	31	28	+3	48	Advance to Torneo Reducido
9	Colegiales	34	13	8	13	26	26	0	47	
10	All Boys	34	8	17	9	26	25	+1	41	
11	Racing (C)	34	10	11	13	38	44	−6	41	
12	Ferro Carril Oeste	34	10	11	13	24	33	−9	41	
13	Güemes	34	8	16	10	28	32	−4	40	
14	Los Andes	34	10	10	14	27	31	−4	40	
15	Quilmes	34	8	14	12	30	32	−2	38	
16	Almagro	34	7	14	13	24	31	−7	35	
17	Arsenal (R)	34	8	10	16	38	47	−9	34	Relegation to Primera B Metropolitana
18	Alvarado (R)	34	6	15	13	18	33	−15	33	Relegation to Torneo Federal A

Source: AFA
Rules for classification: 1) points; 2) play-off (only for deciding relegation); 3) goal difference; 4) goals scored; 5) head-to-head points; 6) head-to-head goal difference; 7) head-to-head goals scored.
(R) Relegated

=== Results ===
Home \ Away	ALL	ALM	ALV	ARS	ATL	CLG	DEM	DMA	FCO	GYT	GÜE	LAN	PAT	QUI	RAC	SMT	SMI	TRI
All Boys	—	1–0	1–1	2–1	0–0	0–0	0–0	0–0	0–1	1–1	3–1	3–0	1–0	0–0	4–0	0–0	2–1	0–2
Almagro	1–0	—	0–0	3–1	0–0	0–0	1–0	0–1	0–1	0–1	0–1	1–0	2–1	2–2	1–1	0–0	1–0	0–1
Alvarado	0–0	1–1	—	0–2	0–0	1–0	0–2	0–0	3–0	2–1	1–1	1–0	3–1	0–0	0–1	0–2	0–0	0–0
Arsenal	0–0	2–2	5–0	—	1–1	0–2	1–1	1–2	2–0	0–0	2–1	1–1	0–1	0–1	2–1	0–1	5–2	0–0
Atlanta	0–0	1–0	0–2	4–0	—	1–0	1–0	0–3	2–1	1–0	1–0	2–1	1–1	2–0	2–0	3–1	1–1	1–0
Colegiales	2–1	2–0	0–0	1–1	2–0	—	1–0	0–1	1–0	2–0	1–0	0–1	0–0	1–0	0–1	2–0	0–0	1–0
Deportivo Madryn	2–1	2–1	1–0	2–1	1–1	3–1	—	1–1	1–0	2–0	1–0	1–0	2–0	3–1	1–2	3–1	2–1	0–0
Deportivo Maipú	0–0	3–1	3–0	1–1	0–1	1–2	2–1	—	2–1	1–0	1–1	1–1	1–1	2–0	1–1	0–1	0–1	1–0
Ferro Carril Oeste	0–0	1–1	0–0	2–0	0–1	1–0	1–1	2–0	—	0–0	0–0	2–0	3–1	1–0	2–2	0–2	0–1	0–0
Gimnasia y Tiro	0–0	1–0	3–0	3–0	2–2	4–0	1–1	1–0	1–2	—	1–0	0–0	2–1	2–1	2–0	2–0	1–0	1–1
Güemes	1–2	1–1	1–1	1–0	2–0	1–0	1–3	1–1	1–1	1–1	—	2–1	1–1	0–0	1–0	2–1	1–0	0–1
Los Andes	1–1	1–0	1–0	1–3	3–0	0–0	2–1	3–0	0–1	0–0	2–0	—	1–3	1–0	2–0	1–1	0–0	2–0
Patronato	3–1	0–0	1–0	1–0	0–0	0–1	0–0	1–0	3–0	0–0	1–1	0–0	—	1–0	3–2	0–1	2–1	2–0
Quilmes	3–1	0–1	0–0	3–1	2–1	1–0	1–1	2–2	0–0	1–1	0–0	2–0	1–1	—	3–0	1–2	2–0	0–1
Racing (C)	0–0	1–1	2–1	3–0	1–1	2–1	2–3	0–1	4–0	1–2	2–2	1–1	1–0	2–0	—	1–0	1–1	1–1
San Martín (T)	1–1	1–1	0–0	0–3	4–0	2–0	0–0	2–1	1–0	1–0	1–1	1–0	0–1	1–1	1–1	—	0–1	1–1
San Miguel	1–0	1–1	2–0	1–1	0–0	2–1	1–1	2–0	2–0	1–0	1–1	1–0	0–0	2–2	1–0	2–2	—	2–1
Tristán Suárez	2–0	2–1	2–1	3–1	0–0	2–2	2–2	1–1	1–1	1–0	0–0	2–1	2–0	0–0	4–1	0–0	0–0	—

Source: AFA
Legend: Blue = home team win; Yellow = draw; Red = away team win.

== Zone B ==
=== Standings ===
Pos	Team	Pld	W	D	L	GF	GA	GD	Pts	Qualification or relegation
1	Gimnasia y Esgrima (M) (C, P)	34	17	12	5	35	18	+17	63	Advance to Final and qualification for Copa Argentina
2	Estudiantes (RC) (O, P)	34	16	12	6	35	22	+13	60	Advance to Torneo Reducido and qualification for Copa Argentina
3	Estudiantes (BA)	34	17	8	9	41	22	+19	59	Advance to Torneo Reducido and qualification for Copa Argentina
4	Deportivo Morón	34	15	13	6	36	19	+17	58	Advance to Torneo Reducido and qualification for Copa Argentina
5	Gimnasia y Esgrima (J)	34	15	12	7	36	20	+16	57	Advance to Torneo Reducido and qualification for Copa Argentina
6	Temperley	34	14	13	7	30	22	+8	55	Advance to Torneo Reducido and qualification for Copa Argentina
7	Agropecuario Argentino	34	15	9	10	43	34	+9	54	Advance to Torneo Reducido and qualification for Copa Argentina
8	Chaco For Ever	34	15	8	11	34	26	+8	53	Advance to Torneo Reducido and qualification for Copa Argentina
9	Chacarita Juniors	34	12	13	9	37	29	+8	49	
10	Defensores de Belgrano	34	12	12	10	30	26	+4	48	
11	Nueva Chicago	34	10	11	13	27	33	−6	41	
12	San Telmo	34	10	11	13	31	42	−11	41	
13	Mitre (SdE)	34	10	10	14	28	31	−3	40	
14	Almirante Brown	34	8	12	14	28	38	−10	36	
15	Central Norte	34	10	6	18	27	41	−14	36	
16	Colón	34	9	5	20	22	39	−17	32	
17	Talleres (RdE) (R)	34	6	5	23	17	40	−23	23	Relegation to Primera B Metropolitana
18	Defensores Unidos (R)	34	3	12	19	17	52	−35	21	Relegation to Primera B Metropolitana

Source: AFA
Rules for classification: 1) points; 2) play-off (only for deciding relegation); 3) goal difference; 4) goals scored; 5) head-to-head points; 6) head-to-head goal difference; 7) head-to-head goals scored.
(C) Champions; (O) Play-off winners; (P) Promoted; (R) Relegated

=== Results ===
Home \ Away	AGA	CAB	CEN	CHA	CFE	COL	DBE	DUN	DMO	EBA	ERC	GEJ	GEM	MIT	NCH	STE	TAL	TEM
Agropecuario Argentino	—	3–1	2–0	0–1	2–0	2–1	1–1	3–0	1–0	1–2	2–1	1–1	2–0	2–1	1–0	2–0	2–1	0–0
Almirante Brown	0–0	—	0–0	1–3	0–0	2–0	1–2	1–1	1–1	0–1	0–2	0–0	1–1	2–0	0–0	1–0	2–1	0–0
Central Norte	0–2	2–1	—	2–1	0–1	3–4	2–1	3–0	0–0	1–1	1–2	1–2	1–0	0–2	1–1	1–2	1–0	2–0
Chacarita Juniors	3–0	0–1	4–0	—	0–3	3–2	0–2	2–0	1–1	0–3	0–2	0–1	1–1	2–2	0–0	1–1	2–1	0–0
Chaco For Ever	1–1	2–1	1–0	0–0	—	2–0	1–0	2–0	1–1	0–1	2–0	2–1	0–2	0–1	2–1	1–2	1–0	2–0
Colón	0–1	1–0	2–0	1–1	2–1	—	0–1	1–0	0–0	0–0	0–1	0–1	0–2	0–1	2–1	0–1	1–0	0–0
Defensores de Belgrano	1–1	1–1	2–0	1–0	0–0	1–0	—	3–1	0–0	2–1	0–0	0–1	0–2	1–0	1–2	1–2	0–0	0–0
Defensores Unidos	3–2	1–1	1–1	0–0	0–2	0–1	1–2	—	0–1	1–1	1–2	0–3	0–1	0–2	0–0	2–2	0–0	0–0
Deportivo Morón	1–1	2–0	2–0	0–2	3–0	1–0	1–0	4–0	—	1–1	2–1	0–0	1–0	3–0	1–0	1–1	3–0	0–1
Estudiantes (BA)	2–1	5–2	0–1	0–2	1–2	1–0	2–0	3–0	0–1	—	1–0	0–0	0–0	2–0	2–0	2–0	2–0	0–0
Estudiantes (RC)	1–1	1–1	1–0	1–1	0–0	2–1	1–1	0–0	1–0	1–0	—	1–1	1–1	1–0	0–1	1–0	2–0	1–0
Gimnasia y Esgrima (J)	0–2	1–0	1–0	2–0	2–0	4–0	0–0	1–1	0–0	0–1	2–2	—	2–0	0–0	2–1	1–1	1–0	2–0
Gimnasia y Esgrima (M)	2–1	2–1	1–0	0–0	2–0	1–1	1–0	2–0	1–0	1–0	1–1	1–0	—	1–0	1–1	2–0	1–1	0–1
Mitre (SdE)	3–0	1–0	0–2	0–0	1–0	0–1	1–2	0–1	0–0	1–1	0–0	1–1	1–1	—	0–1	3–0	2–0	2–2
Nueva Chicago	1–0	1–3	0–0	1–1	0–0	1–0	0–0	1–0	1–2	2–1	1–2	1–0	1–1	2–0	—	0–2	2–0	0–1
San Telmo	3–3	0–1	3–1	0–1	0–2	1–0	0–3	2–2	1–2	1–0	0–1	3–2	0–0	0–0	2–2	—	1–0	0–3
Talleres (RdE)	2–0	1–2	0–1	0–2	1–0	2–0	2–0	0–1	2–1	0–1	0–2	0–1	0–1	1–3	2–1	0–0	—	0–0
Temperley	1–0	2–0	1–0	0–3	2–2	2–1	1–1	3–0	1–1	1–3	1–0	1–0	0–2	2–0	3–0	0–0	1–0	—

Source: AFA
Legend: Blue = home team win; Yellow = draw; Red = away team win.

== Championship final ==
The top teams of each zone played a match on neutral ground to decide the champions and the first team promoted to Primera División. The losing team entered the Torneo Reducido in the second round.

11 October 2025
17:00 UTC−3

Deportivo Madryn	1–1 (a.e.t.)	Gimnasia y Esgrima (M)
Silba 76'	Report	Lencioni 90+3' (pen.)
Penalties
F. Recalde (penalty missed); Maná (penalty missed); Crego (penalty missed)	0–3	(penalty scored) Cingolani; (penalty scored) Lencioni; (penalty scored) M. Recalde

Estadio Ciudad de Vicente López, Florida
Referee: Nicolás Ramírez

Team details

Deportivo Madryn
Gimnasia y Esgrima (M)

GK	1	(Argentina) Yair Bonnín (c)
DF	4	(Argentina) Agustín Sosa
DF	2	(Argentina) Facundo Giacopuzzi		(substituted off) 72'
DF	6	(Argentina) Alejandro Gutiérrez
DF	3	(Argentina) Diego Martínez
MF	7	(Argentina) Diego Crego
MF	5	(Argentina) Federico Recalde
MF	8	(Argentina) Bruno Pérez		(substituted off) 69'
MF	10	(Argentina) Nazareno Solís	(yellow card) 23'	(substituted off) 81'
FW	9	(Argentina) Luis Silba		(substituted off) 82'
FW	11	(Argentina) Germán Rivero		(substituted off) 106'
Substitutions:
DF	14	(Argentina) Santiago Postel	(yellow card) 101'	(substituted in) 72'
MF	15	(Argentina) Abel Bustos		(substituted in) 81'
FW	17	(Argentina) Ezequiel Montagna		(substituted in) 69'
FW	19	(Argentina) Nicolás Maná		(substituted in) 82'
FW	20	(Paraguay) Elías Ayala		(substituted in) 106'
Manager:
(Argentina) Leandro Gracián

GK	1	(Argentina) César Rigamonti
DF	4	(Argentina) Facundo Nadalín		(substituted off) 110'
DF	2	(Argentina) Diego Mondino (c)	(yellow card) 20'
DF	6	(Argentina) Imanol González
DF	3	(Argentina) Franco Saavedra	(yellow card) 21'	(substituted off) 80'
MF	5	(Argentina) Fermín Antonini	(yellow card) 28'	(substituted off) 46'
MF	8	(Argentina) Matías Muñoz		(substituted off) 87'
MF	11	(Argentina) Facundo Lencioni	(yellow card) 113'
MF	10	(Argentina) Nicolás Romano		(substituted off) 65'
FW	7	(Argentina) Nicolás Servetto		(substituted off) 67'
FW	9	(Argentina) Brian Ferreyra
Substitutions:
DF	14	(Argentina) Matías Recalde		(substituted in) 65'
DF	18	(Argentina) Ismael Cortez		(substituted in) 110'
MF	16	(Argentina) Ignacio Antonio		(substituted in) 46'
MF	19	(Argentina) Jeremías Rodríguez		(substituted in) 87'
FW	21	(Argentina) Luciano Cingolani		(substituted in) 80'
FW	23	(Argentina) Mario Galeano		(substituted in) 67'
Manager:
(Argentina) Ariel Broggi				(yellow card) 22'

== Torneo Reducido ==
The teams placing second to eighth place in each zone, along with the loser of the championship final played the Torneo Reducido for the second and last promotion berth to the Liga Profesional, in which teams were seeded in each round according to their final placement in the first stage of the tournament. The first round was played over a single leg, at the stadium of the higher-seeded team. The second round (in which the championship final loser entered the Reducido), the semi-finals and the finals were played over two legs, with the higher-seeded team hosting the second leg. In all rounds except for the final, the higher-seeded team advanced in case of a tie, with a penalty shoot-out set to be played in case of a draw in the final.

=== First round ===
11 October 2025	Atlanta	3–0	Chaco For Ever	Buenos Aires
13:00 UTC−3	Valdez Chamorro 4' (pen.); Echeverría 64'; Medina 77'	Report		Stadium: Don León Kolbowski; Referee: Daniel Zamora

11 October 2025	Gimnasia y Tiro	2–0	Temperley	Salta
20:30 UTC−3	Rojas 81'; Villarreal 90+6'	Report		Stadium: El Gigante del Norte; Referee: Álvaro Carranza

12 October 2025	Gimnasia y Esgrima (J) (bsr)	0–0	San Miguel	Jujuy
15:10 UTC−3		Report		Stadium: 23 de Agosto; Referee: Bruno Amiconi

12 October 2025	Estudiantes (BA)	1–0	Deportivo Maipú	Caseros
17:10 UTC−3	Berterame 7'	Report		Stadium: Ciudad de Caseros; Referee: Ariel Penel

12 October 2025	Tristán Suárez	2–1	Agropecuario Argentino	Tristán Suárez
19:00 UTC−3	Domínguez 2', 12' (pen.)	Report	Vásquez 56'	Stadium: 20 de Octubre; Referee: Yamil Possi

12 October 2025	Estudiantes (RC)	2–1	Patronato	Río Cuarto
19:10 UTC−3	Garnerone 14' (pen.); González 19'	Report	Díaz 48'	Stadium: Antonio Candini; Referee: Nahuel Viñas

12 October 2025	Deportivo Morón (bsr)	0–0	San Martín (T)	Morón
21:15 UTC−3		Report		Stadium: Nuevo Francisco Urbano; Referee: Pablo Giménez

=== Second round ===
Team 1	Agg.	Team 2	1st leg	2nd leg
Gimnasia y Esgrima (J)	0–4	Deportivo Madryn	0–3 (Awd.)	0–1
Gimnasia y Tiro	0–2	Estudiantes (RC)	0–0	0–2
Deportivo Morón	1–0	Atlanta	1–0	0–0
Tristán Suárez	0–1	Estudiantes (BA)	0–0	0–1

==== First leg ====
18 October 2025	Gimnasia y Tiro	0–0	Estudiantes (RC)	Salta
22:00 UTC−3		Report		Stadium: El Gigante del Norte; Referee: Bryan Ferreyra

19 October 2025	Gimnasia y Esgrima (J)	0–3; Awarded	Deportivo Madryn	Jujuy
14:45 UTC−3	Quintana 42'	Report		Stadium: 23 de Agosto; Referee: Lucas Comesaña
Note: The match was suspended at halftime with Gimnasia y Esgrima (J) leading 1–0 due to threats to the refereeing team. On 27 October 2025, the Argentine Football Association awarded Deportivo Madryn a 3–0 win.

19 October 2025	Deportivo Morón	1–0	Atlanta	Morón
17:00 UTC−3	Constantino 90+1'	Report		Stadium: Nuevo Francisco Urbano; Referee: Fabrizio Llobet

20 October 2025	Tristán Suárez	0–0	Estudiantes (BA)	Tristán Suárez
19:00 UTC−3		Report		Stadium: 20 de Octubre; Referee: Juan Pablo Loustau

==== Second leg ====
31 October 2025	Estudiantes (RC)	2–0 (2–0 agg.)	Gimnasia y Tiro	Río Cuarto
21:15 UTC−3	Ferreira 31'; L. González 67'	Report		Stadium: Antonio Candini; Referee: Daniel Zamora

1 November 2025	Atlanta	0–0 (0–1 agg.)	Deportivo Morón	Buenos Aires
13:45 UTC−3		Report		Stadium: Don León Kolbowski; Referee: Felipe Viola

2 November 2025	Deportivo Madryn	1–0 (4–0 agg.)	Gimnasia y Esgrima (J)	Puerto Madryn
16:00 UTC−3	Silba 36'	Report		Stadium: Abel Sastre; Referee: Fabrizio Llobet

2 November 2025	Estudiantes (BA)	1–0 (1–0 agg.)	Tristán Suárez	Caseros
19:00 UTC−3	Ramírez 90+2'	Report		Stadium: Ciudad de Caseros; Referee: Hernán Mastrángelo

=== Semi-finals ===
Team 1	Agg.	Team 2	1st leg	2nd leg
Deportivo Morón	1–1	Deportivo Madryn (bsr)	1–0	0–1
Estudiantes (BA)	1–1	Estudiantes (RC) (bsr)	1–0	0–1

==== First leg ====
8 November 2025	Estudiantes (BA)	1–0	Estudiantes (RC)	Caseros
19:40 UTC−3	Acosta 51'	Report		Stadium: Ciudad de Caseros; Referee: Bruno Amiconi

8 November 2025	Deportivo Morón	1–0	Deportivo Madryn	Morón
21:10 UTC−3	Vázquez 48'	Report		Stadium: Nuevo Francisco Urbano; Referee: Pablo Dóvalo

==== Second leg ====
15 November 2025	Estudiantes (RC) (bsr)	1–0 (1–1 agg.)	Estudiantes (BA)	Río Cuarto
20:00 UTC−3	L. González 45+1'	Report		Stadium: Antonio Candini; Referee: Ariel Penel

16 November 2025	Deportivo Madryn (bsr)	1–0 (1–1 agg.)	Deportivo Morón	Puerto Madryn
17:15 UTC−3	Postel 13'	Report		Stadium: Abel Sastre; Referee: Pablo Echavarría

=== Finals ===
22 November 2025
21:15 UTC−3

Estudiantes (RC)	2–0	Deportivo Madryn
T. González 61'; Antonini 85'	Report

Estadio Antonio Candini, Río Cuarto
Referee: Darío Herrera

30 November 2025
17:00 UTC−3

Deportivo Madryn	1–1	Estudiantes (RC)
Silba 63'	Report	Morales 84'

Estadio Abel Sastre, Puerto Madryn
Referee: Facundo Tello

Estudiantes (RC) won 3–1 on aggregate and promoted to the Liga Profesional.

Team details

Deportivo Madryn
Estudiantes (RC)

GK	1	(Argentina) Yair Bonnín (c)	Booked
DF	4	(Argentina) Agustín Sosa		Substituted off
DF	2	(Argentina) Facundo Giacopuzzi	Booked
DF	6	(Argentina) Alejandro Gutiérrez
DF	3	(Argentina) Diego Martínez	Booked	Substituted off
MF	5	(Argentina) Federico Recalde	Booked	Sent off (straight red)
MF	8	(Argentina) Bruno Juncos		Substituted off
MF	10	(Argentina) Nazareno Solís
MF	7	(Argentina) Diego Crego
FW	9	(Argentina) Luis Silba
FW	11	(Argentina) Germán Rivero
Substitutions:
FW	18	(Argentina) Ezequiel Montagna		Substituted in
MF	19	(Argentina) Juan Galeano		Substituted in
FW	20	(Paraguay) Elías Ayala		Substituted in
Manager:
(Argentina) Leandro Gracián

GK	1	(Argentina) Brian Olivera
DF	4	(Argentina) Juan Antonini	Booked
DF	2	(Argentina) Gonzalo Maffini (c)
DF	6	(Argentina) Sergio Ojeda	Booked
DF	3	(Argentina) Lucas Angelini
MF	8	(Argentina) Martín Garnerone		Substituted off
MF	5	(Argentina) Alejandro Cabrera
MF	11	(Argentina) Mauro Valiente		Substituted off
MF	10	(Argentina) Tomás González		Substituted off
FW	7	(Argentina) Lucas González		Substituted off
FW	9	(Argentina) Javier Ferreira		Substituted off
Substitutions:
DF	14	(Argentina) Facundo Cobos		Substituted in
MF	19	(Argentina) Fabio Vázquez		Substituted in
FW	18	(Argentina) Agustín Morales		Substituted in
FW	20	(Argentina) Agustín Fontana		Substituted in
Manager:
(Argentina) Iván Delfino

== Copa Argentina qualification ==
Fifteen Primera Nacional teams qualified for the round of 32 of the 2026 Copa Argentina, which were the top seven teams of each zone and the best eighth-placed team at the end of the season, which was selected according to points, goal difference, goals scored, and a drawing of lots if needed.

=== Ranking of eighth-placed teams ===
Pos	Grp	Team	Pld	W	D	L	GF	GA	GD	Pts	Qualification
1	B	Chaco For Ever	34	15	8	11	34	26	+8	53	Qualification for Copa Argentina
2	A	Patronato	34	12	12	10	31	28	+3	48	

Source: AFA
Rules for classification: 1) Points; 2) Goal difference; 3) Goals scored; 4) Drawing of lots.

== Season statistics ==
=== Top scorers ===
Rank	Player	Club	Goals
1	(Argentina) Alejandro Gagliardi	Agropecuario Argentino	18
2	(Argentina) Mateo Acosta	Estudiantes (BA)	14
3	(Argentina) Alan Bonansea	Patronato	11
4	(Argentina) Ignacio Sabatini	Arsenal	10
5	(Argentina) Matías Romero	Chaco For Ever	9
5	(Argentina) Germán Rivero	Deportivo Madryn	9
5	(Argentina) Yair González	Deportivo Morón	9
5	(Argentina) Ivo Constantino	Deportivo Morón	9
5	(Argentina) Lucas González	Estudiantes (RC)	9
5	(Argentina) Alejandro Quintana	Gimnasia y Esgrima (J)	9
5	(Argentina) Brian Ferreyra	Gimnasia y Esgrima (M)	9
5	(Argentina) Facundo Lencioni	Gimnasia y Esgrima (M)	9
5	(Argentina) Sebastián Cocimano	San Telmo	9

== See also ==
- 2025 Argentine Primera División
- 2025 Copa Argentina
- 2025 Torneo Federal A
