= Guillermo Tambussi =

Argentine footballer (born 1982)

Personal information
- Full name: Guillermo Andrés Tambussi
- Date of birth: 12 November 1982 (age 43)
- Place of birth: Mar del Plata, Argentina
- Height: 1.81 m (5 ft 11 in)
- Position: Forward

Senior career*
Years	Team	Apps	(Gls)
2003–2005	Racing Club	0	(0)
2004–2005	→ La Plata (loan)	23	(10)
2006	La Plata	13	(4)
2006–2007	Sportivo Italiano	24	(7)
2007–2008	Sportivo Atenas	22	(2)
2008–2009	Racing de Córdoba	25	(6)
2009–2010	Deportivo Maipú	16	(3)
2010	Palestino	3	(0)
2010–2011	Estudiantes RC	31	(15)
2011–2012	Boca Unidos	12	(1)
2012–2013	Crucero del Norte	21	(3)
2013–2014	San Martín Tucumán	13	(1)
2014	Deportivo Maipú	11	(3)
2015	Mitre SdE	0	(0)
2015	Alvarado	0	(0)
2015–2016	Sportivo Atenas	30	(3)
2017–2018	Juventud Unida RC	10	(2)
2019–2020	Municipal AM	14	(5)
2021	Juventud Unida RC	4	(0)
2021–2023	Municipal AM	5	(2)
- * Club domestic league appearances and goals

Guillermo Andrés Tambussi (born 12 November 1982) is an Argentine former footballer who played as a forward.

== Teams ==
- Racing Club de Avellaneda 2003–2004
- La Plata 2004–2005
- Racing Club de Avellaneda 2005
- La Plata 2006
- Sportivo Italiano 2006–2007
- Sportivo Atenas 2007–2008
- Racing de Córdoba 2008–2009
- Deportivo Maipú 2009–2010
- Palestino 2010
- Estudiantes de Río Cuarto 2010–2011
- Boca Unidos 2011–2012
- Crucero del Norte 2012–2013
- San Martín de Tucumán 2013–2014
- Deportivo Maipú 2014
- Mitre SdE 2015
- Alvarado 2015
- Sportivo Atenas 2015–2016
- Juventud Unida de Río Cuarto 2017–2018
- Municipal Adelia María 2019–2020
- Juventud Unida de Río Cuarto 2021
- Municipal Adelia María 2021–2023

== Personal life ==
He is the younger brother of the former footballer Leonardo Tambussi.
