= Villa Sauze =

- Town
- Location within Buenos Aires Province
- Coordinates: 35°17′S 63°22′W
- Country: Argentina
- Province: Buenos Aires
- Partidos: General Villegas
- Established: February 28, 1913
- Elevation: 97 m (318 ft)

Population (2001 Census)
  - Total: 581
- Time zone: UTC−3 (ART)
- CPA Base: B 6235
- Climate: Dfc

Villa Sauze is a town located in the General Villegas Partido in the province of Buenos Aires, Argentina, near the border with the province of La Pampa.

== Geography ==
Villa Sauze is located approximately 50 km (31 mi) from the regional center of General Villegas.

== History ==
A small settlement had been established in what would become the town by the early 1900s. The town's founding date, however, is considered to be February 28, 1910, when the land making up the town was auctioned for use by a doctor. Similarly to most towns in its vicinity, Villa Sauze developed as a center for agricultural production.

== Population ==
According to INDEC, which collects population data for the country, the town had a population of 581 people as of the 2001 census.
