= Dulcich =

Dulcich is a surname. Notable people with the surname include:

- Greg Dulcich (born 2000), American football player
- Silvio Dulcich (born 1981), Argentine footballer
