= Facundo Lencioni =

Argentine footballer

Personal information
- Full name: Facundo Valentín Lencioni
- Date of birth: 14 February 2001 (age 25)
- Place of birth: Rafaela, Santa Fe, Argentina
- Height: 1.80 m (5 ft 11 in)
- Position: Midfielder

Team information
- Current team: Gimnasia Mendoza
- Number: 26

Youth career
- Belgrano

Senior career*
Years	Team	Apps	(Gls)
2021–2026	Belgrano	39	(2)
2025	→ Gimnasia Mendoza (loan)	34	(10)
2026–	Gimnasia Mendoza	16	(2)
- * Club domestic league appearances and goals as of 16:42, 10 May 2026 (UTC)

Facundo Valentín Lencioni (born 14 February 2001) is an Argentine professional footballer who plays as a midfielder or winger for Gimnasia Mendoza.

== Career ==
Lencioni came through the youth setup at Belgrano and made his debut on 25 April 2021 against Nueva Chicago in the Primera Nacional. He did not feature as Belgrano were promoted in the next season, but signed his first professional contract on 11 November 2022 and was then incorporated into the first team. He scored his first goal in the Liga Profesional on 25 October 2023 against Central Córdoba SdE in a 1–1 draw.

After receiving limited opportunities at Belgrano, he moved back down to the Primera Nacional to join Gimnasia Mendoza on loan, joining for the season with a $500,000 purchase option for 50% of his economic rights. He became top scorer in the division in July as Gimnasia led the table, receiving plaudits for his standout performances. They reached the Primera Nacional final on 11 October against Deportivo Madryn and Lencioni scored a late penalty to make the score 1–1, before scoring in the penalty shootout to secure his side's promotion to the Liga Profesional. On 12 December 2025, Gimnasia announced that they had exercised his transfer option. He scored his first goal in the Primera for Gimnasia in a 1–0 win against Instituto on 9 February 2026.

== Career statistics ==
As of 21 January 2026

Appearances and goals by club, season and competition
Club	Season	League			Cup (Note: Includes Copa Argentina)		Continental		Other		Total	
Club	Season	Division	Goals	Apps	Apps	Goals	Apps	Goals	Apps	Goals	Apps	Goals
Belgrano	2021	Primera Nacional	2	0	—		—		—		2	0
Belgrano	2022	Primera Nacional	0	0	—		—		—		0	0
Belgrano	2023	AFA Liga Profesional de Fútbol	16	1	1	0	—		—		17	1
Belgrano	2024	AFA Liga Profesional de Fútbol	21	1	1	0	4 (Note: Appearances in Copa Sudamericana)	1	—		26	2
Belgrano	Total		39	2	2	0	4	1	0	0	45	3
Gimnasia Mendoza (loan)	2025	Primera Nacional	34	10	2	0	—		—		36	10
Career total			73	12	4	0	4	1	0	0	81	13
