= Pruzzo =

Pruzzo is an Italian surname. Notable people with the surname include:

- Lucas Pruzzo (born 1994), Argentine footballer
- Roberto Pruzzo (born 1955), Italian footballer and manager
