= Hugo Urruti =

Argentine footballer

Personal information
- Full name: Hugo Urruti
- Date of birth: 16 August 1987 (age 39)
- Place of birth: Rosario, Argentina
- Height: 1.70 m (5 ft 7 in)
- Position: Left-back

Senior career*
Years	Team	Apps	(Gls)
2006–2010	Tiro Federal	21	(0)
2010–2011	Racing de Córdoba	23	(1)
2012	Ñublense	3	(0)
2013–2014	Belgrano de Arequito	–	(–)
2014	Jorge Newbery VT	–	(–)
- * Club domestic league appearances and goals

Hugo Urruti (born 16 August 1987) is an Argentine former professional footballer who played as a left-back.

== Teams ==
- (Argentina) Tiro Federal 2006–2010
- (Argentina) Racing de Córdoba 2010–2011
- (Chile) Ñublense 2012
- (Argentina) Belgrano de Arequito 2013–2014
- (Argentina) Jorge Newbery de Venado Tuerto 2014
