= Humid Pampas =

Grassland in Argentina

Humid Pampas (NT0803)
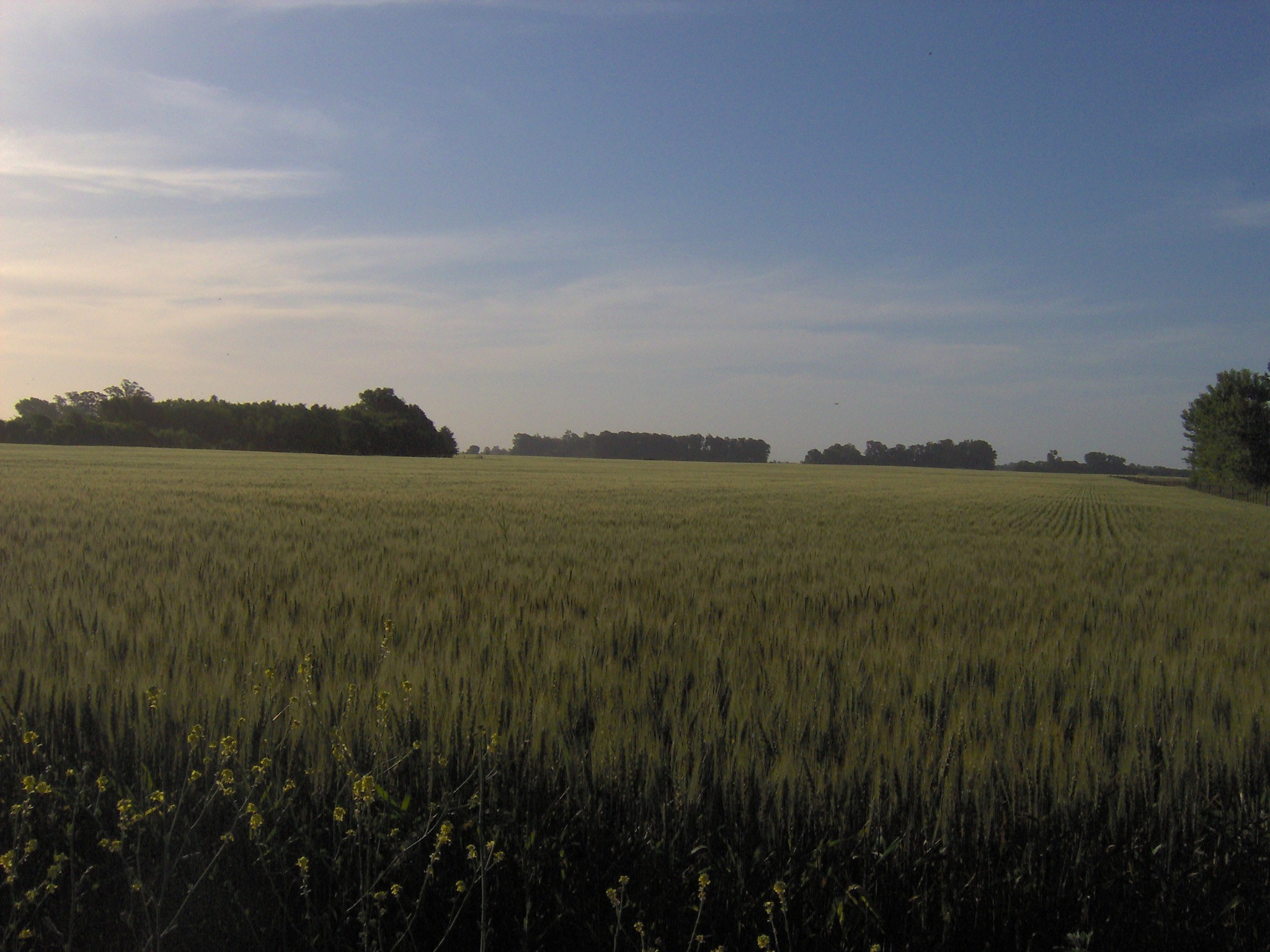
- Barley field in Buenos Aires Province.

- Location in Argentina

Ecology
- Realm: Neotropical
- Biome: Temperate grasslands, savannas, and shrublands
- Borders: Argentine Espinal; Paraná flooded savanna; Uruguayan savanna

Geography
- Countries: Argentina
- Coordinates: 35.83°S 60.54°W
- Climate type: Mostly humid subtropical (Cfa) and oceanic (Cfb) in the southeastern part

The Humid Pampas (Spanish: Pampa Húmeda) is an extensive ecoregion of flat, fertile grassland of loessic origin in Argentina. It has a precipitation average of 900 mm per year, in contrast with the Dry Pampas to the west, which average less than 700 mm.

== Setting ==
Like the Pampas in general, the region's terrain is predominantly hilly and of a temperate climate, though rich mollisols are more abundant here than to the west, where soils of loessic origin are more common. Except for a few bluffs near the Paraná and Río de la Plata rivers, as well as the Tandilia and Ventania mountain ranges to the south, the region's slope rarely exceeds 6 degrees. It covers Buenos Aires Province almost completely, the centre and south of Santa Fe Province, most of Córdoba Province and the eastern third of La Pampa Province, totalling at least 600,000 km^{2}.

The Uruguayan savanna, which lies east of the rivers in Entre Ríos Province of Argentina, Uruguay and the south of Brazil, is sometimes considered part of the Humid Pampa. The Uruguayan savanna is not as flat as the named aforementioned areas.

The flatlands are also interrupted by low hill ranges like Tandilia in the southeast, namely at Sierra de los Padres, Balcarce, Olavarría, Tandil and like the higher system of the Sierra de la Ventana to the south, near Bahía Blanca. Finally, there are also some dunes at the Atlantic coast, such as at the city of Banderaló.

== Climate ==
The area is characterised by four distinct seasons. Winter brings chilly, occasionally frosty nights. Humid, temperate weather characterizes spring and fall. Summer days can be extremely hot. The natural vegetation comprises meadows of high grass with isolated forests (locally referred to as montes) of algarrobos, talas and chanares, which used to be common in areas near the main rivers but have been mostly cut down during the 20th century. The great rhea lives in the pampas of Argentina and eats plants, lizards, insects, frogs, small birds and snakes.

== Flora ==
The Humid Pampa is characterized by medium-height grassland, with both perennial and annual grasses with scattered herbs and shrubs. The grasslands are interspersed with areas of dry woodland as well as freshwater and saltwater wetlands and lagoons.

The ombú, considered an emblem of the Humid Pampa (and not a proper tree but a herb), grows naturally north of the Río de la Plata and east of the Paraná, seldom south of the Río de la Plata and never south of the Salado. Before the introduction of cattle, horses and sheep by the Spaniards on the 16th century, the region was covered by hard grass, but the animals' grazing facilitated the growth of softer, greener grass.

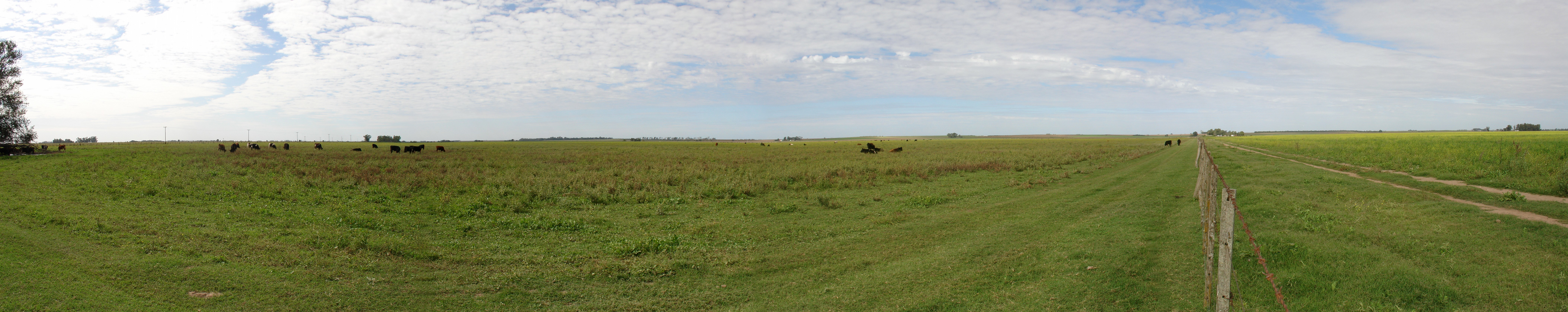
Grazing land in La Pampa Province

== Population ==
Due to the important immigration to Argentina in the second half of the 19th century and first decades of the 20th, and because the weather allowed for two annual harvests, the lands started being heavily used for agriculture, which made Argentina a major agricultural producer (the self-styled "Granary of the World"). Being fertile and close to the Atlantic Ocean, the Humid Pampa was one of the preferred destinations of millions of immigrants, who were mostly Italian, French and Spanish, but also German and other Europeans.

The lands of the region were taken care of by the gauchos for centuries, and the region was the centre of their culture, including their music and dances. Areas that were kept for extensive breeding of cattle and sheep stayed under the control of large estates' owners, and in lesser number to medium-size estates. Smaller farms are known as "chacras" (their owners being chacareros or chacreros).

The urban population of Argentina (92% of its population) is concentrated in cities within the Humid Pampa. According to the 2022 National Census, Argentina's three largest cities are all located in this region: Buenos Aires (3.1 million in the autonomous city, with the Greater Buenos Aires metropolitan area totaling 14.0 million), Córdoba (1.5 million), and Rosario (1.3 million). In all, over 20 million Argentines live in the Humid Pampa region, which produces a significant portion of the Argentine economy.

Given the commercial and agricultural desirability of most of this area for the last 130 years, not much pristine land remains. One of the best corners of unspoiled pampa is the Otamendi Natural Preserve near Campana, Buenos Aires Province. Established in 1990 on 2,600 hectares (10 mi^{2}) of former grazing land, the parcel has become one of Argentina's chief points of interest in its agrotourism circuit.

== Gallery ==
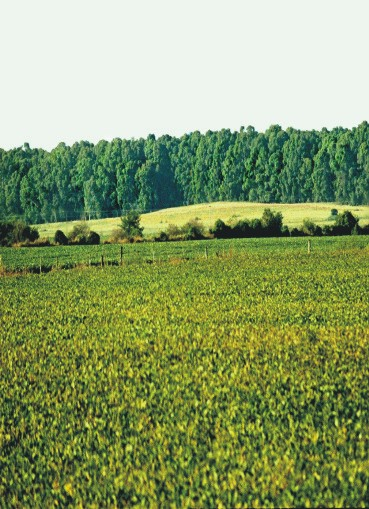
Soy field near Junín, Buenos Aires Province

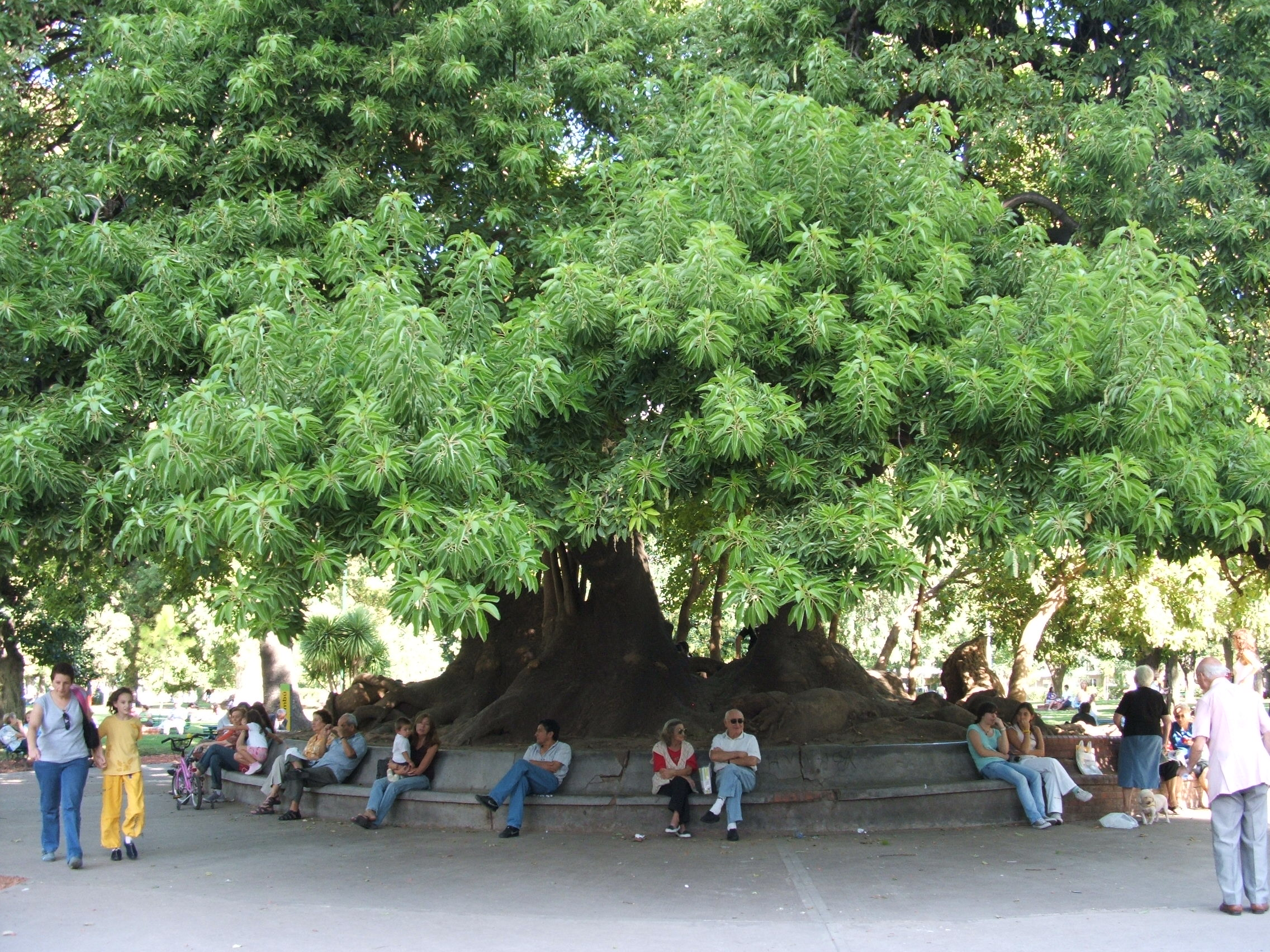
Ombú in a Buenos Aires city park. Prized for its copious shade, it has been planted liberally through the pampas

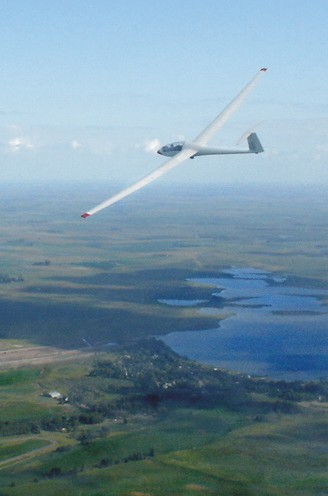
Sailplaning over the pampas. Popularized by German-Argentine Rolf Hossinger in the 1950s, Argentine sailplaners have won a number of world championships

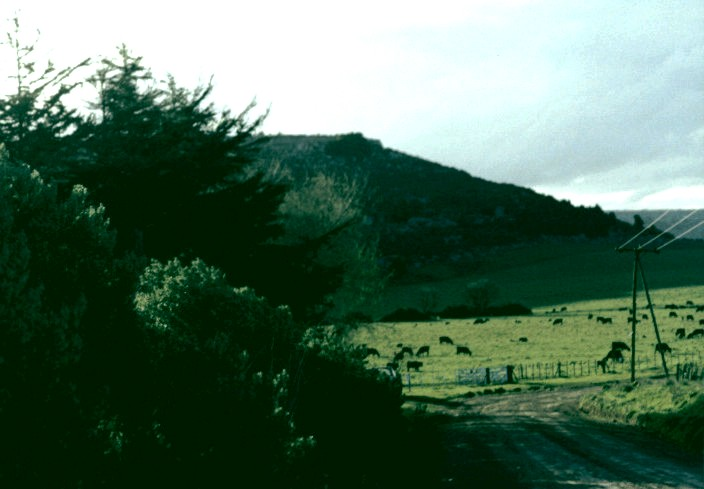
Sierra de los Padres hills
