= Alejandro Gutiérrez =

Alejandro Gutiérrez may refer to:

- Alejandro Gutiérrez Arango (politician) (1840–1931), Colombian politician, governor of Antioquia
- Alejandro Gutiérrez Arango (born 1995), Colombian professional footballer
- Alejandro Gutiérrez del Barrio (1895–1954), Spanish-born musician and composer, worked in the cinema of Argentina
- Alejandro Gutiérrez Gutiérrez (born 1956), Mexican politician, deputy and senator
- Alejandro Gutiérrez Mozo (Álex Mozo) (born 1995), Spanish footballer
- Alejandro Gutiérrez, member of the Hermanos Gutiérrez Latin instrumental band
- Alejandro Gutierrez, character in the film Dora and the Lost City of Gold
