= Rubén Piaggio =

Argentine footballer and manager

Personal information
- Full name: Rubén Dario Piaggio
- Date of birth: 2 April 1970 (age 56)
- Place of birth: General Villegas, Argentina
- Height: 1.79 m (5 ft 10 in)
- Position: Midfielder

Senior career*
Years	Team	Apps	(Gls)
1990–1992	Gimnasia LP	31	(4)
1992–1993	Unión Santa Fe	6	(1)
1993	Internacional	1	(0)
1993–1994	Dock Sud		
1994–1996	Gimnasia de Jujuy	48	(8)
1996–1997	Ferro Carril Oeste	27	(6)
1997	Huracán	9	(0)
1997–2000	Tigres UANL	11	(0)
1998	→ Deportes Concepción (loan)	16	(0)
1999–2000	→ Marítimo (loan)	13	(1)
2000–2001	Ionikos	17	(0)
2001–2002	Racing de Ferrol	7	(0)
2002	Granada	17	(1)
2002–2004	Pergolese	39	(8)
2005	El Linqueño	6	(2)
2006	Fossombrone		

Managerial career
- 2007–2009: Atlético Villegas
- 2010–2011: Ingeniero White
- 2012: Boca Unidos (assistant)
- 2013: Eclipse Villegas
- 2014: FC Bunge
- 2015: Atlético Sarlone
- 2015: Rubio Ñu
- 2016–2017: Ferro Carril Oeste (youth)
- 2016: Ferro Carril Oeste (interim)
- 2018: Atlético Ameghino
- * Club domestic league appearances and goals

Rubén Darío Piaggio (born 2 April 1970) is a former Argentine footballer, considered one of the best attacking midfielders in his country during the 1990s. Ferrocarril Oeste fans called him "Ciruelo" ("The Plum"). In 1996, he became the first Ferro player in history to score a hat-trick against Boca Juniors.

== Career ==
Piaggio played for Gimnasia y Esgrima (LP), Gimnasia de Jujuy, Ferro Carril Oeste and Huracán in the Primera División Argentina. He also had spells with Internacional in the Campeonato Brasileiro Série A, Tigres in the Primera División de Mexico, Deportes Concepción in the Primera División de Chile, Marítimo in the Portuguese Liga, Ionikos in the Super League Greece, Racing de Ferrol in Segunda División and Granada in Segunda División B.

In his last seasons, Piaggio played in Italy for Pergolese and Fossombrone and El Linqueño in his homeland.

== Personal life ==
Like Piaggio, his father and brother were footballers; though only in regional football. Two of his nephews, Fermín and Juan Antonini, are professional footballers.
