= Estudiantes de Río Cuarto =

Argentine sports club

AA Estudiantes
- Full name: Asociación Atlética Estudiantes
- Nicknames: Celeste; León; Imperio del Sur
- Founded: 21 September 1912; 114 years ago
- Ground: Estadio Antonio Candini
- Capacity: 12,000
- Chairman: Alicio Dagatti
- Manager: Rubén Forestello
- League: Liga Profesional de Fútbol
- 2025: 2nd of Zone B (promoted via Torneo Reducido)
Home colours	Away colours	Third colours

Asociación Atlética Estudiantes, mostly known as Estudiantes de Río Cuarto is an Argentine sports club located in the city of Río Cuarto, Córdoba Province. Although many sports are practised at the club, it is mostly known for its football team, which will play in the Primera Nacional (the second division of the Argentine football system) since 2027 after its relegation in the 2026 tournament.

Apart from football, other sports practised at the club are basketball, field hockey, futsal, tennis, and artistic gymnastics.

== History ==
The club was established on 21 September 1912 by a group of students of "Colegio Nacional nº 1", in the city of Río Cuarto.

Estudiantes played at the highest level of Argentine football, Primera División, on 3 consecutive occasions, having qualified to play the Nacional championship in 1983, 1984 and 1985. In its debut season in 1983, the team was eliminated after finishing 4th. of 4 teams (Talleres de Córdoba and Ferro Carril Oeste qualified to second stage). In 1984, Estudiantes was eliminated at the first stage, finishing 3rd in their group of 4 teams. The squad also achieved a 2–2 draw against River Plate, winning only one game v. Entre Ríos' Atlético Uruguay.

Estudiantes made their best campaign in Primera in 1985, finishing 2nd in its group and therefore qualifying to the next stage. During the group stage the team faced Boca Juniors, achieving a 1–1 tie in the first match although the Xeneizes then easily defeated them 7–1 in the return fixture. In the 2nd stage Estudiantes would be finally eliminated by San Martín de Tucumán (2–4 on aggregate).

Estudiantes had never played in the second division so the team qualified to Torneo Nacional via regional league. In 2019 Estudiantes won the 2018–19 Torneo Federal A championship therefore the squad qualified for the Primera Nacional. Estudiantes made their debut in the second division in 2019–20 but the tournament was suspended due to the COVID-19 pandemic

After that, Estudiantes lost two consecutive chances to promote to Primera División, both in the same season, 2020 Primera Nacional. The team lost the championship final to Sarmiento de Junín 3–4 on penalties, and the second came in Torneo Reducido, when Estudiantes lost another penalty shoot-out (3–4) v Platense in search of the second promotion.

After those two failed attempts, finally in November 2025, Estudiantes defeated Deportivo Madryn 3–1 on aggregate and returned to the highest level after 40 years.

== Players ==
=== Current squad ===
As of 23 September 2026 Note: Flags indicate national team as defined under FIFA eligibility rules; some limited exceptions apply. Players may hold more than one non-FIFA nationality.

No.	Pos.	Nation	Player
1	GK	ARG	Lucas Bruera (on loan from Carabobo)
2	DF	ARG	Gonzalo Maffini (captain)
3	DF	ARG	Lucas Baños
4	DF	ARG	Valentín Fenoglio
5	MF	ARG	Alejandro Cabrera (on loan from Banfield)
6	DF	ARG	Juan Antonini
7	FW	ARG	Lucas González
8	MF	ARG	Siro Rosané (on loan from Barracas Central)
9	FW	PAR	Javier Ferreira
10	MF	ARG	Tomás González
11	FW	ARG	Martín Garnerone
12	GK	ARG	Francisco Gualtieri
13	MF	ARG	Francisco Romero
14	DF	ARG	Gonzalo González
16	FW	COL	Yeison Moreno
17	MF	ARG	Gabriel Alanís (on loan from Huracán)

No.	Pos.	Nation	Player
19	MF	ARG	Nicolás Talpone (on loan from Colón)
21	DF	ARG	Matías Ruiz Díaz
22	FW	ARG	Mauro Valiente
23	DF	ARG	Fernando Rodríguez
27	MF	ARG	Juan Garro
28	DF	ARG	Facundo Cobos
29	DF	ARG	Agustín Quiroga
30	DF	ARG	Sergio Ojeda
31	DF	ARG	Matías Valenti
32	FW	ARG	Mateo Bajamich (on loan from Atlético Tucumán)
40	MF	ARG	Francesco Lo Celso
43	GK	ARG	Agustín Lastra (on loan from Boca Juniors)
45	DF	ARG	Raúl Lozano (on loan from Quilmes)
50	FW	ARG	Ramón Ábila
77	FW	SYR	Ibrahim Hesar
99	FW	COL	Juan Chala

=== Reserve squad ===
Note: Flags indicate national team as defined under FIFA eligibility rules; some limited exceptions apply. Players may hold more than one non-FIFA nationality.

No.	Pos.	Nation	Player
15	FW	ARG	Ramiro Bornia
27	FW	ARG	Benjamín Moyano
34	GK	ARG	Lautaro Herrera (on loan from Quilmes)
35	FW	ARG	Facundo Gallardo

No.	Pos.	Nation	Player
38	MF	ARG	Lautaro Cepeha
47	DF	ARG	Bautista Pieroni
85	MF	ARG	Mateo Rodríguez
86	DF	ARG	Matías Pagliaricci

=== Out on loan ===
Note: Flags indicate national team as defined under FIFA eligibility rules; some limited exceptions apply. Players may hold more than one non-FIFA nationality.

No.	Pos.	Nation	Player
8	FW	ARG	Federico Álvarez (at Atlanta until 31 December 2026)
18	FW	ARG	Marcelo Olivera (at Olimpo until 31 December 2026)

=== Current coaching staff ===
Position	Staff
Head coach	(Argentina) Rubén Forestello
Assistant coach	(Argentina) Carlos Bangert
Assistant coach	(Argentina) Alejandro Meloño
Fitness coach	(Argentina) Leandro Ardengui
Fitness coach	(Argentina) Juan Nahas
Goalkeeping coach	(Argentina) Silvio Dulcich
Video analyst	(Argentina) Bautista Morales

== Notable players ==
Estudiantes' most notable player is Pablo Aimar, who made his youth career at the club before moving to River Plate, where he made his professional debut in 1996. Aimar had retired from football in 2015, but he made a brief return to play the 2017–18 Copa Argentina for Estudiantes, where his brother Andrés was part of the team. Aimar played 50 minutes in the second leg v Sportivo Belgrano, which ended 0–0.
