= Marcelo Olivera =

Argentine footballer (born 1999)

Personal information
- Full name: Marcelo Esteban Olivera
- Date of birth: 4 January 1999 (age 27)
- Place of birth: Colonia Victoria, Argentina
- Height: 1.76 m (5 ft 9 in)
- Position: Forward

Team information
- Current team: Olimpo (on loan from Estudiantes RC)

Youth career
- Eldorado de Misiones
- 2014–2018: Quilmes

Senior career*
Years	Team	Apps	(Gls)
2017–2018	Quilmes	1	(0)
2019–2020	Universidad San Martín	18	(3)
2021–2024	Estudiantes RC	13	(1)
2022	→ Sportivo Las Parejas (loan)	18	(3)
2023	→ Villa Dálmine (loan)	21	(2)
2024	Independiente Chivilcoy	28	(14)
2024–2025	Bartolomé Mitre	1	(0)
2025–	Estudiantes RC	2	(0)
2026–	→ Olimpo (loan)	0	(0)
- * Club domestic league appearances and goals as of 17:04, 14 April 2026 (UTC)

Marcelo Esteban Olivera (born 4 January 1999) is an Argentine footballer who plays as a forward for Olimpo, on loan from Estudiantes RC.

== Club career ==
=== Early life and Quilmes ===
Olivera started playing football at Unión Cultural y Deportivo Eldorado de Misiones until Ricardo Kergavarat saw him play and took him to Buenos Aires to try him out at Quilmes. He stayed and since then he played in the different youth categories of the club, which he arrived in 2014 when he was 15 years old and immediately adapted, scoring a lot of goals for the different youth teams. 15-year old Olivera was soon promoted to the clubs reserve team, where he made his debut against Club de Gimnasia y Esgrima La Plata and in October 2016, 17-year old Olivera started training with the professional team. He was also awarded to prizes by the end of the year by Argentine Football Association.

He played kept scoring goals for the reserves until on 21 June 2017 where he, without a professional contract, made his debut in the Argentine Primera División against Arsenal de Sarandí (2-2). He started on the bench, but replaced Gabriel Ramírez in the 78th minute. However, this was his first and last professional game for the club.

=== Universidad San Martín ===
In January 2019, Olivera appeared in training sessions at Universidad San Martín in Peru, having turned 20 years old and without having signed a contract with Quilmes, at least for the moment, according to the decision of the directive. The legislation says, that when a player turns 20 years old and the club haven't signed with him or the player refuses to sign his first contract, the player can go to a club in a different country from the club of origin as a free player.

Olivera did not return to Quilmes training on 3 January 2019 because he didn't have a contract, and on 4 January 2019, he turned 20 and began training with Universidad San Martín. Quilmes, through the Argentine Football Association, immediately attempted a protest of the case. Eventually, Olivera made the preseason with San Martín, scoring goals in friendlies and signing a contract as a free player on 10 February 2019.

On 16 February 2019, he made his official debut for the club in a 1–1 draw against UTC Cajamarca, where he also scored his first goal in Peru and at a professional level. Although he began to enjoy a lot of regularity, an injury in June took him away from the courts throughout the 2019 season, returning to play in February 2020 again, after more than 7 months out of action. He left the club at the end of 2020.

=== Estudiantes Río Cuarto ===
In June 2021, Olivera returned to Argentina and joined Estudiantes de Río Cuarto. A year later, in June 2022, Olivera was loaned out to Sportivo Las Parejas until the end of the year. Ahead of the 2023, he was then loaned out to Villa Dálmine for the rest of 2023. However, the loan was cut short, as the club confirmed on 31 August 2023, that Olivera was one of a few players that had been dismissed from the squad.

On October 24, 2024, after spell at Independiente Chivilcoy, Olivera joined Bartolomé Mitre. But already in January 2025, he returned to his former club, Estudiantes RC.
