= Santa Regina, Buenos Aires =

Santa Regina
- Town
- Location within Buenos Aires Province
- Coordinates: 34°32′S 63°10′W
- Country: Argentina
- Province: Buenos Aires
- Partidos: General Vilegas
- Established: October 14, 1869
- Elevation: 121 m (397 ft)

Population (2001 Census)
  - Total: 533
- Time zone: UTC−3 (ART)
- CPA Base: B 6105
- Climate: Dfc

Santa Regina is a town in the General Villegas Partido in the province of Buenos Aires, Argentina.

== Geography ==
Santa Regina is located 75 km (47 mi) from the regional center of General Villegas.

== History ==
The region around Santa Regina was first settled by Europeans in 1869, who constructed a fort in order to defend the region from attacks by native tribes. The fort's founding year is considered to have also been the founding year of Santa Regina, making it the oldest town in the partido. A railway station was constructed in the town in 1900, leading to the arrival of immigrants into the town a year later.

In recent years, the town has suffered from several floods, notably in 1997 and 2016. Many of these floods have blocked road access to the community, leading to concerns over Santa Regina's future. In 2024, the town's post office was closed following an order from the Argentine government.

== Population ==
According to INDEC, which collects population data for the country, the town had a population of 533 people as of the 2001 census.
