= Pablo Aimar =

Argentine football manager (born 1979)

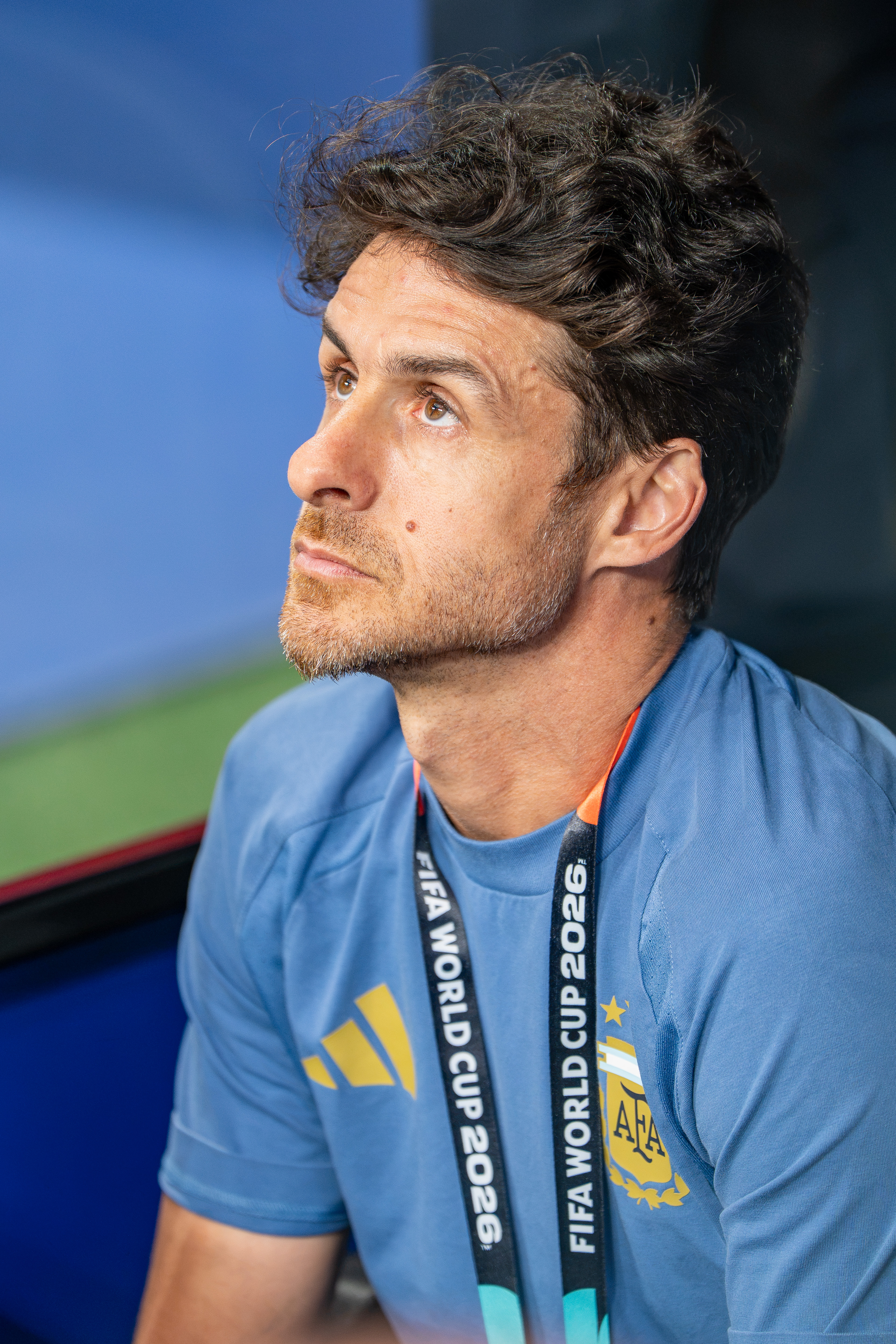
- Aimar in 2026

Personal information
- Full name: Pablo César Aimar
- Date of birth: 3 November 1979 (age 47)
- Place of birth: Río Cuarto, Argentina
- Height: 1.70 m (5 ft 7 in)
- Position: Attacking midfielder

Team information
- Current team: Argentina (assistant coach)

Youth career
- 1985–1993: Estudiantes Río Cuarto
- 1993–1997: River Plate

Senior career*
Years	Team	Apps	(Gls)
1996–2000	River Plate	82	(21)
2001–2006	Valencia	162	(27)
2006–2008	Zaragoza	57	(5)
2008–2013	Benfica	107	(12)
2013–2014	Johor Darul Ta'zim	8	(2)
2015	River Plate	1	(0)
2018	Estudiantes Río Cuarto	1	(0)
Total		414	(67)

International career
1995	Argentina U17	6	(2)
1997	Argentina U20	7	(1)
1999–2009	Argentina	52	(8)

Managerial career
- 2017–2022: Argentina U17
- 2018–: Argentina (assistant)
Medal record
Men's football
Representing Argentina (as player)
FIFA U-20 World Cup
Winner	1997 Malaysia
South American U-20 Championship
Winner	1997 Chile
Winner	1999 Argentina
FIFA Confederations Cup
Runner-up	2005 Germany
Copa América
Runner-up	2007 Venezuela
South American U-17 Championship
Runner-up	1995 Ecuador
FIFA U-17 World Cup
Third place	1995 Ecuador
Representing Argentina (as manager)
South American U-17 Championship
Winner	2019 Peru
Representing Argentina (as assistant manager)
FIFA World Cup
Winner	2022 Qatar
Copa América
Winner	2021 Brazil
Winner	2024 United States
Third place	2019 Brazil
CONMEBOL–UEFA Cup of Champions
Winner	2022 England
- * Club domestic league appearances and goals

Pablo César Aimar (born 3 November 1979) is an Argentine former professional footballer and current assistant coach of the Argentina national team. He has been considered as one of the most talented and creative attacking midfielders of his generation. Nicknamed "El Payaso" (The Clown) and "El Mago" (The Magician) due to his talent, players like Lionel Messi and Andrés Iniesta mentioned Aimar as their childhood idol.

After starting his senior career at River Plate in 1996, Aimar amassed La Liga totals of 215 games and 32 goals over eight seasons with Valencia and Zaragoza from 2001 to 2008, before spending five years in Portugal with Benfica, winning a combined nine major titles with the three teams.

Aimar earned 52 caps for the Argentina senior team over ten years, representing the nation in two FIFA World Cups and two Copa América tournaments, as well as a FIFA Confederations Cup. He reached the final of the 2005 Confederations Cup and the 2007 Copa América with the Argentine national side.

In 2018, Aimar joined the Argentina national team as an assistant coach. During his tenure, the team won the 2021 Copa América, the 2022 Finalissima, the 2022 World Cup, and the 2024 Copa América.

== Club career ==
=== River Plate ===
Aimar's football career begun in earnest when he was offered the chance to play for Estudiantes de Río Cuarto by youth coach Alfie Mercado. He trained with the club's academy three times a week and it was there that he was spotted by River Plate who offered the chance to join their own academy. Aimar's father initially prevented him from joining River as he felt he was too young to be playing football, but relented after manager Daniel Passarella personally asked him to allow his son to play. Having turned down the opportunity to attend medical school to pursue a career in football, Aimar made his debut for River on 11 August 1996 against Colón. His first goal for the club came on 20 February 1998 against Rosario Central. Aimar lifted six titles with River between 1996 and 2000, scoring 21 goals and recording 28 assists in 82 league appearances for the club, with his final appearance coming on 17 December 2000 in a 3–2 loss to Lanús.

=== Valencia ===
In January 2001, Spanish La Liga side Valencia signed Aimar from River for a club-record fee of €24 million (£13 million). He made his debut for the club the following month against Manchester United and drew praise from three-time Ballon d'Or winner Johan Cruyff for his performance after the match. The following weekend he scored on his La Liga debut, netting in a 2–0 away win over Las Palmas. Aimar immediately became a key figure in Valencia's midfield under Héctor Cúper and helped the club reach the 2001 UEFA Champions League final, where they lost to Bayern Munich on penalties.

In the season which followed, Cúper left for Internazionale, and was replaced by Rafael Benítez. Aimar appeared in a total of 33 league games and scored 4 goals as Valencia were crowned 2001–02 La Liga champions for the first time in 31 years, ending as the club's third-highest goalscorer across all competitions for the season. The season thereafter, Aimar jointly topped the Champions League assists table alongside Rui Costa of Milan with five assists to his name, this despite Valencia being eliminated at the quarter-final stage. The club endured further disappointment by ending the league season in fifth place.

"Pablo is the only current footballer I'd pay to watch. He’s been the best player in Argentina over the last couple of years and is even more talented than Riquelme or Saviola.

— Diego Maradona in a 2003 interview with World Soccer.

The club's failures were soon forgotten, however, as Valencia completed a league and UEFA Cup double the following season. Despite making more than 30 appearances for the season and playing an influential role in the club's UEFA Cup triumph, Aimar was sidelined for large parts of the season in what was to set an injury-plagued tone to his career.

Following a breakdown between Benítez and Valencia's sporting director Jesús García Pitarch, the former left his position at the club and was replaced by Italian manager Claudio Ranieri for the 2004–05 season. A combination of injury concerns and tactical changes from the manager saw Aimar struggle under Ranieri and found himself being employed as a substitute more frequently than before. The Italian departed the club in February and was replaced by Antonio López, who in turn was replaced by Quique Sánchez Flores for the following season. Aimar decided to leave the club at the end of the 2005–06 season having amassed over 200 appearances for the club over the course of five-and-a-half seasons.

=== Zaragoza ===
In the summer of 2006, Aimar joined fellow top flight club Real Zaragoza on a four-year deal for a reported fee of €11 million, with the club describing the deal as the most important signing in the club's history. At Zaragoza, he was reunited with compatriot and former Valencia teammate Roberto Ayala, who himself had joined the club earlier in the month. Aimar made his league debut on 27 August in a 2–3 away loss against Deportivo de La Coruña and went on to make 32 appearances across all competitions, scoring five goals and helping the club to a sixth-place finish in the league. The following season was a disastrous one for Aimar and Zaragoza as the club, fraught with poor performances and financial mismanagement were relegated from La Liga. Zaragoza's relegation saw Aimar bring an end to his time in Aragon, having made 57 appearances during his two-season stay with the club. During his stint with Zaragoza, he obtained dual-Spanish nationality, having lived in the country since 2001.

=== Benfica ===
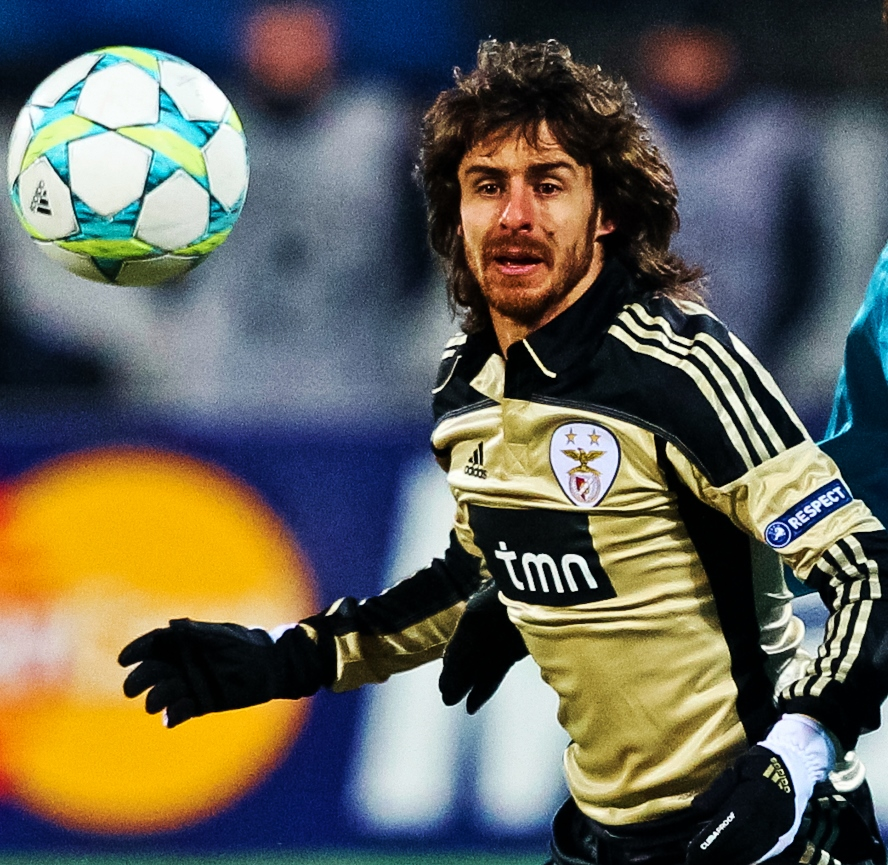
Aimar playing for Benfica in 2012

On 17 July 2008, Aimar signed a four-year contract with Portuguese side Benfica for a fee of €6.5 million. After struggling with injuries initially, he finished the campaign with a string of strong performances and was able to add a Taça da Liga title to his name.

In the 2009–10 season, Aimar was reunited with former River Plate teammate Javier Saviola, who was let go by Real Madrid following his own injury struggles. The two combined as double trequartista to support striker Óscar Cardozo alongside fellow Argentine Ángel Di María on the wing. The quartet formed the Primeira Liga's most dangerous attack, with Benfica scoring 78 goals on their way to a league and cup double.

"I have never played with another player who knows where I'm going to be or just lifts his head knowing where I'm going to."

— Javier Saviola on his playing relationship with Aimar.

Aimar had become a fan favourite at the Estádio da Luz but injuries continued to plague him, and his game time reduced in the coming seasons. In spite of this, he helped the club to its third and fourth consecutive Taça da Liga titles. On 6 June 2013, after 179 official appearances, 17 goals and 34 assists, Aimar announced he was leaving Benfica and thanked the club for "five wonderful years".

=== Johor Darul Ta'zim ===
On 7 August 2013, Tunku Ismail Ibrahim, the president of Malaysian club Johor Darul Ta'zim and also known as the Crown Prince of Johor, confirmed that Aimar had signed a two-year contract with the team. Upon arrival, he became the highest paid player ever to feature in the Malaysia Super League. He made his debut in the league six months after signing, in a 2–0 win against Perak FA. Prior to making his debut, Aimar had previously played at the Larkin Stadium, home of Johor, before with Argentina in the 1997 FIFA World Youth Championship. He ultimately made 8 appearances for the club and scored two goals before a spate of injuries resulted in him being released on 21 April 2014. Aimar did earn a champions medal for his time with JDT, though, as the club went on to lift the 2014 league title at the end of the season.

=== Return to River Plate ===
On 5 January 2015, Aimar returned to River Plate for the club's pre-season training, stating that he would sign with the club only if he could deal with the physical demand after having undergone surgeries to his heel and not having played since leaving Johor Darul Ta’zim in April 2014. On 31 May, he played as substitute in a home win against Rosario Central in the Primera División. Aimar announced his retirement on 14 July 2015 after River Plate coach Marcelo Gallardo informed him that he was not included in the club's squad for the semi-final stage of the Copa Libertadores. Gallardo said Aimar was "suffering" and had struggled with injuries through the pre-season.

=== Estudiantes de Río Cuarto ===
On 16 January 2018, Aimar played in a friendly match for his youth club Estudiantes de Río Cuarto. After the match, he announced that he would be joining the squad ahead of the Copa Argentina fixture against Sportivo Belgrano on 23 January, in order to fulfill his wish of making an official appearance for the club where he began and spent eight years.

The Copa Argentina match took place at Estudiantes' home stadium Estadio Ciudad de Río Cuarto. Aimar was picked in the starting line up and wore the captain's armband, coming close to opening the score with a shot that was parried by the goalkeeper, before getting subbed off in the 50th minute. The match ended in a goalless draw, which was not enough to see Estudiantes through the next round after a 2–1 loss in the first leg. His brother Andrés was also in the line-up of Estudiantes. Afterwards, Aimar confirmed that he had no intention of making a definitive comeback and that this was indeed his farewell match from football.

== International career ==
Aimar first represented Argentina at youth levels. Along with future senior team players Esteban Cambiasso and Juan Román Riquelme he won the 1997 FIFA World Youth Championship and went on to earn 52 senior caps following his debut in 1999, scoring eight international goals in total. He represented Argentina at the 1999 and 2007 editions of the Copa América, at the 2002 and 2006 FIFA World Cups, and at the 2005 FIFA Confederations Cup.

In the 2002 World Cup, for which he was picked ahead of Riquelme, Aimar appeared against England, subbing in for Juan Sebastián Verón in the 1–0 loss, which led coach Marcelo Bielsa to start him against Sweden at the latter's expense.

Aimar scored the last goal of the 2005 FIFA Confederations Cup during Argentina's 4–1 loss in the final to champions Brazil. He also appeared with the national side in the 2007 Copa América, scoring a goal in a 4–1 win against the United States in his team's opening group match of the competition; Argentina went on to reach the final of the tournament, losing out to Brazil once again, this time 0–3, with Aimar coming on as a second-half substitute for Cambiasso.

After several months in the sidelines, Aimar received another international callup in October 2009, for decisive 2010 World Cup qualifiers against Peru and Uruguay. In the match against the former he repaid the faith placed in him by coach Diego Maradona, assisting Gonzalo Higuaín for Argentina's opener with a through ball, in an eventual 2–1 win.

== Style of play ==
An technical and creative attacking midfielder with a small frame, Aimar was a right-footed player with a vast array of skills and scoring abilities. He excelled in a free role as an advanced playmaker where he was able to utilize his dribbling skills, vision and passing ability to create chances for teammates and orchestrate attacks. Moreover, he was a free kick specialist. His skills and playing style earned him comparisons with Diego Maradona in his youth. He was given the nicknames El Payaso (the clown) and El Mago (the wizard) throughout his career. Compatriot Lionel Messi stated in 2002 that Aimar was one of his biggest influences as a player. In addition to his playing ability, Aimar also drew praise for his leadership qualities.

== Coaching career ==
Aimar was appointed as coach of the Argentina national under-17 football team in July 2017. His under-17 team won the South American U-17 Championship in 2019.

In 2022, Aimar was appointed as an assistant coach at the Argentina national football team. He was part of the Argentina managerial team who won the 2022 FIFA World Cup. He was also part of the managerial team at the 2026 World Cup.

== Personal life ==
Aimar's younger brother, Andrés, was also a professional footballer and a midfielder. He represented several teams in his country – starting his career at River Plate – also playing for a few months in Belgium, Portugal and Israel. In October 2022 Aimar's mother – Mary – died. In March 2026 Aimar's father – Ricardo "Payo" – died.

== Career statistics ==
=== Club ===
Appearances and goals by club, season and competition
Club	Season	League			Cup (Note: Includes the Copa del Rey, Supercopa de España, Taça de Portugal, and Copa Argentina)		Continental (Note: Includes the Copa Libertadores, Supercopa Sudamericana, Copa Mercosur, UEFA Champions League, UEFA Cup, UEFA Super Cup, and UEFA Intertoto Cup)		Other (Note: Includes the Taça da Liga, and Supertaça Cândido de Oliveira)		Total	
Club	Season	Division	Apps	Goals	Apps	Goals	Apps	Goals	Apps	Goals	Apps	Goals
River Plate	1995–96	Argentine Primera División	1	0	—		—		—		1	0
River Plate	1996–97	Argentine Primera División	—		—		—		—		0	0
River Plate	1997–98	Argentine Primera División	16	4	—		7	2	—		23	6
River Plate	1998–99	Argentine Primera División	18	2	—		9	1	—		27	3
River Plate	1999–00	Argentine Primera División	33	13	—		8	3	—		41	16
River Plate	2000–01	Argentine Primera División	15	4	—		5	1	—		20	5
River Plate	Total		83	23	0	0	29	7	0	0	112	30
Valencia	2000–01	La Liga	10	2	—		8	0	—		18	2
Valencia	2001–02	La Liga	33	4	1	0	6	2	—		40	6
Valencia	2002–03	La Liga	31	8	4 (Note: Includes two appearances in the Supercopa de España)	0	11	3	—		46	11
Valencia	2003–04	La Liga	25	4	5	0	8	0	—		38	4
Valencia	2004–05	La Liga	31	4	2 (Note: Includes one appearance in the Supercopa de España)	0	6	2	—		39	6
Valencia	2005–06	La Liga	32	5	2	0	1	0	—		35	5
Valencia	Total		162	27	13	0	40	7	—		216	34
Zaragoza	2006–07	La Liga	31	5	1	0	—		—		32	5
Zaragoza	2007–08	La Liga	22	0	2	0	1	0	—		25	0
Zaragoza	Total		53	5	3	0	1	0	—		57	5
Benfica	2008–09	Primeira Liga	22	1	2	0	1	0	4	1	29	2
Benfica	2009–10	Primeira Liga	25	4	1	0	11	1	4	0	41	5
Benfica	2010–11	Primeira Liga	23	5	6	1	12	1	5 (Note: Includes one appearance in the Supertaça Cândido de Oliveira)	0	46	7
Benfica	2011–12	Primeira Liga	24	2	2	0	12	1	4	0	42	3
Benfica	2012–13	Primeira Liga	13	0	3	0	3	0	2	0	21	0
Benfica	Total		107	12	14	1	39	3	18	1	179	17
Johor Darul Ta'zim	2014	Malaysia Super League	8	2	0	0	—		—		8	2
Johor Darul Ta'zim	Total		8	2	0	0	0	0	0	0	8	2
River Plate	2015	Argentine Primera División	1	0	1	0	0	0	0	0	2	0
Estudiantes Río Cuarto	2017–18	Torneo Federal A	—		1	0	—		—		1	0
Career total			413	67	32	1	101	17	18	1	566	86

=== International ===
Argentina
Year	Apps	Goals
1999	2	0
2000	5	1
2001	8	0
2002	6	1
2003	9	4
2004	2	0
2005	6	1
2006	6	0
2007	7	1
2009	1	0
Total	52	8

==== International goals ====
Argentina score listed first, score column indicates score after each Aimar goal.

#	Date	Venue	Opponent	Score	Result	Competition
1.	16 August 2000	Estadio Monumental, Buenos Aires, Argentina	Paraguay	1–1	1–1	2002 World Cup qualification
2.	27 March 2002	Geneva, Switzerland	Cameroon	2–1	2–2	Friendly
3.	30 April 2003	June 11 Stadium, Tripoli, Libya	Libya	3–1	3–1	Friendly
4.	6 September 2003	Estadio Monumental, Buenos Aires, Argentina	Chile	2–0	2–2	2006 World Cup qualification
5.	9 September 2003	Estadio Olímpico, Caracas, Venezuela	Venezuela	1–0	3–0	2006 World Cup qualification
6.	15 November 2003	Estadio Monumental, Buenos Aires, Argentina	Bolivia	3–0	3–0	2006 World Cup qualification
7.	29 June 2005	Waldstadion, Frankfurt, Germany	Brazil	1–4	1–4	2005 FIFA Confederations Cup
8.	28 June 2007	José Pachencho Romero, Maracaibo, Venezuela	United States	3–1	4–1	2007 Copa América

=== Managerial ===
As of 27 October 2022

Managerial record by team and tenure
Team	From	To	Record							
Team	From	To	G	W	D	L	GF	GA	GD	Win %
Argentina U-17	13 July 2017	Present	20	13	3	4	36	21	+15	65.00
Total			20	13	3	4	36	21	+15	65.00

== Honours ==
=== Player ===
River Plate

- Argentine Primera División: 1996 Apertura, 1997 Clausura, 1997 Apertura, 1999 Apertura, 2000 Clausura
- Supercopa Sudamericana: 1997

Valencia

- La Liga: 2001–02, 2003–04
- UEFA Champions League runner-up: 2000–01
- UEFA Cup: 2003–04
- UEFA Super Cup: 2004

Benfica

- Primeira Liga: 2009–10
- Taça de Portugal runner-up: 2012–13
- Taça da Liga: 2008–09, 2009–10, 2010–11, 2011–12
- UEFA Europa League runner-up: 2012–13

Johor Darul Ta’zim

- Malaysian Super League: 2014

Argentina U17

- South American Under-17 Championship runner-up: 1995
- FIFA U-17 World Cup third place: 1995

Argentina U20

- South American Youth Championship: 1997, 1999
- FIFA World Youth Championship: 1997

Argentina

- FIFA Confederations Cup runner-up: 2005
- Copa América runner-up: 2007

Individual

- FIFA World Youth Championship Bronze Ball: 1997
- South American Team of the Year: 1999, 2000
- UEFA Champions League top assist provider: 2002–03
- Trofeo EFE: 2005–06
- Cosme Damião Awards – Footballer of the Year: 2011

=== Managerial ===
Argentina (as assistant manager)

- FIFA World Cup: 2022
- Copa América: 2021, 2024; third place: 2019
- CONMEBOL–UEFA Cup of Champions: 2022

Argentina U17

- South American U-17 Championship: 2019
