= Piedritas =

- Town
- Location within Buenos Aires Province
- Coordinates: 34°46′16″S 62°59′02″W
- Country: Argentina
- Province: Buenos Aires
- Partidos: General Villegas
- Established: November 30, 1905
- Elevation: 114 m (374 ft)

Population (2001 Census)
  - Total: 1,822
- Time zone: UTC−3 (ART)
- CPA Base: B 6241
- Climate: Dfc

Piedritas is a town located in the General Villegas Partido in the province of Buenos Aires, Argentina.

== History ==
The region that now makes up Piedritas had previously been the site of multiple forts, the first of which was built in 1869. Piedritas was founded on November 30, 1905.

== Population ==
According to INDEC, which collects population data for the country, the town had a population of 1,822 people as of the 2001 census.
