= Francisco Romero (footballer) =

Argentine footballer

Personal information
- Full name: Abel Francisco Romero
- Date of birth: 8 March 1999 (age 27)
- Place of birth: Perico, Argentina
- Height: 1.78 m (5 ft 10 in)
- Position: Midfielder

Team information
- Current team: Estudiantes RC
- Number: 13

Youth career
- Los Fantasmas
- Talleres de Perico
- 2014–2017: Belgrano

Senior career*
Years	Team	Apps	(Gls)
2017–2019	Belgrano	0	(0)
2020	Atlético El Carmen	4	(0)
2020–2025	Estudiantes RC	109	(2)
2025–2026	Deportes Limache	22	(1)
2026–	Estudiantes RC	10	(0)
- * Club domestic league appearances and goals as of 17:17, 11 May 2026 (UTC)

Abel Francisco Romero (born 8 March 1999), known as Francisco Romero, is an Argentine footballer who plays as a midfielder for Estudiantes RC.

== Club career ==
Born in Perico, Argentina, Romero was with Los Fantasmas Academy and Talleres de Perico before joining the Belgrano youth system at the age of 14. He left them in the first half of 2019.

A free agent during almost two years, Romero signed with Estudiantes de Río Cuarto in the Primera Nacional in November 2020. He stayed with them until the 2024 season.

In January 2025, Romero moved to Chile and signed with Deportes Limache on a one-year deal. He made his debut in the 2–2 draw against Colo-Colo for the Copa Chile on 30 January, scored a goal and suffered a concussion after colliding with Salomón Rodríguez.
