= Nuevo Palacio Aurinegro =

Indoor arena in Puerto Madryn, Argentina

Nuevo Palacio Aurinegro is an indoor arena in Puerto Madryn, Argentina. It is primarily used for basketball and is the home arena of the Deportivo Madryn. It holds 3,500 people.
