= Pío Bonacci =

Argentine footballer

Personal information
- Full name: Pío Bonacci
- Date of birth: 26 October 1998 (age 28)
- Place of birth: Chepes, La Rioja, Argentina
- Height: 1.89 m (6 ft 2 in)
- Position: Striker

Team information
- Current team: Deportivo Madryn (on loan from Deportivo Armenio)

Youth career
- Rieles Argentinos
- Comercio Chepes
- Barrio Belgrano
- River Plate Chepes
- 2015–2019: San Martín SJ

Senior career*
Years	Team	Apps	(Gls)
2019–2020	Burgos	0	(0)
2019	→ Real Burgos (loan)	0	(0)
2019–2020	→ Bupolsa (loan)	10	(0)
2020–2022	JJ Urquiza	29	(7)
2022–	Deportivo Armenio	31	(8)
2023	→ San Martín Tucumán (loan)	9	(1)
2024	→ Almirante Brown (loan)	17	(2)
2024	→ Ñublense (loan)	7	(0)
2025	→ Deportivo Maipú (loan)	35	(8)
2026–	→ Deportivo Madryn (loan)	4	(0)
- * Club domestic league appearances and goals as of 16:47, 27 April 2026 (UTC)

Pío Bonacci (born 26 October 1998) is an Argentine footballer who plays as a striker for Deportivo Madryn, on loan from Deportivo Armenio.

== Career ==
Born in Chepes, Argentina, Bonacci was with Rieles Argentinos, Comercio, Barrio Belgrano and River Plate in his hometown before joining the San Martín de San Juan youth ranks. After leaving San Martín, he trialed with Chilean club Barnechea.

In July 2019, Bonacci moved to Spain and signed with Burgos CF. He was immediately loaned out to Real Burgos, with whom he couldn't play, and Bupolsa.

In 2020, Bonacci returned to Argentina and joined JJ Urquiza.

In 2022, Bonacci switched to Deportivo Armenio. He was loaned out to San Martín de Tucumán and Almirante Brown in 2023 and 2024, respectively.

In the second half of 2024, Bonacci moved on loan to Chilean Primera División club Ñublense.

== Personal life ==
Bonacci holds Italian passport.
