= Franco Godoy =

Argentine footballer

Personal information
- Full name: Franco Lionel Godoy Milessi
- Date of birth: 28 June 2000 (age 26)
- Place of birth: San Justo, Argentina
- Height: 1.85 m (6 ft 1 in)
- Position: Centre-back

Team information
- Current team: Deportivo Madryn

Youth career
- 2013–2019: Unión Santa Fe

Senior career*
| Years | Team | Apps | (Gls) |
| 2019–2026 | Unión Santa Fe | 3 | (0) |
| 2021 | → Indep. Rivadavia (loan) | 23 | (0) |
| 2022 | → Ferro Carril Oeste (loan) | 5 | (0) |
| 2023 | → Deportivo Madryn (loan) | 19 | (1) |
| 2024–2025 | → Aldosivi (loan) | 17 | (0) |
| 2026– | Deportivo Madryn | 0 | (0) |
- * Club domestic league appearances and goals as of 18:59, 17 March 2026 (UTC)

Franco Lionel Godoy Milessi (born 28 June 2000) is an Argentine footballer who plays as a centre-back for Deportivo Madryn.

== Professional career ==
On 20 July 2018, Godoy signed his first professional contract with Unión de Santa Fe. Godoy made his debut with Unión in a 4-1 Argentine Primera División loss to Arsenal de Sarandí on 14 September 2019.
