= Fermín Antonini =

Argentine footballer

Personal information
- Date of birth: 2 July 1997 (age 29)
- Place of birth: General Villegas, Argentina
- Position: Midfielder

Team information
- Current team: Gimnasia Mendoza
- Number: 21

Youth career
- 2001–2013: Eclipse Villegas
- 2013–2016: Sarmiento

Senior career*
Years	Team	Apps	(Gls)
2016–2022	Sarmiento	20	(0)
2022	→ Flandria (loan)	3	(0)
2022–2024	Deportivo Riestra	46	(0)
2024–	Gimnasia Mendoza	65	(2)
- * Club domestic league appearances and goals as of 16:41, 10 May 2026 (UTC)

Fermín Antonini (born 2 July 1997) is an Argentine professional footballer who plays as a midfielder for Gimnasia Mendoza.

== Career ==
Antonini's career started in the system of Eclipse Villegas, who he signed for in 2001 - remaining until 2013 when he joined Sarmiento's academy. Ricardo Caruso Lombardi was the manager who selected Antonini for his bow in senior football, with the midfielder starting a goalless draw at home to Godoy Cruz in the Primera División. He made a total of three appearances during 2016, as he did in the subsequent 2016–17 campaign; which ended with Sarmiento being relegated. He featured seven times in 2017–18 as the club reached the promotion play-off finals, though Antonini missed the season's end due to an anterior cruciate ligament injury.

In January 2022, Antonini was loaned out to Primera Nacional club CSD Flandria. The spell at Flandria was cut short, and on 14 June 2022, he made a move to Deportivo Riestra.

== Personal life ==
Antonini's brother, Juan, is a fellow professional footballer. They are nephews of former footballer Rubén Piaggio. Their other uncle, along with their father, grandfather and cousins, played for regional clubs in the General Villegas area.

== Career statistics ==
As of 26 March 2019.

Appearances and goals by club, season and competition
Club	Season	League			Cup		Continental		Other		Total	
Club	Season	Division	Apps	Goals	Apps	Goals	Apps	Goals	Apps	Goals	Apps	Goals
Sarmiento	2016	Primera División	3	0	0	0	—		0	0	3	0
Sarmiento	2016–17	Primera División	3	0	1	0	—		0	0	4	0
Sarmiento	2017–18	Primera B Nacional	7	0	2	0	—		0	0	9	0
Sarmiento	2018–19	Primera B Nacional	0	0	0	0	—		0	0	0	0
Career total			13	0	3	0	—		0	0	16	0
