= Agustín Lastra =

Argentine footballer

Personal information
- Full name: Agustín Jesús Lastra
- Date of birth: 2 January 2001 (age 25)
- Place of birth: Famaillá, Tucumán, Argentina
- Height: 1.93 m (6 ft 4 in)
- Position: Goalkeeper

Team information
- Current team: Estudiantes RC (on loan from Boca Juniors)
- Number: 43

Youth career
- Boca Juniors

Senior career*
Years	Team	Apps	(Gls)
2021–	Boca Juniors	2	(0)
2022–2023	→ Aldosivi (loan)	0	(0)
2024–2025	→ Independiente Rivadavia (loan)	1	(0)
2026–	→ Estudiantes RC (loan)	12	(0)
- * Club domestic league appearances and goals as of 17:33, 8 November 2026 (UTC)

Agustín Jesús Lastra (born 2 January 2001) is an Argentine footballer currently playing as a goalkeeper for Estudiantes RC, on loan from Boca Juniors.

== Career ==
On 26 January 2022, Lastra joined Aldosivi on loan from Boca Juniors until December 2022.

On 18 January 2025, Lastra joined Independiente Rivadavia on loan from Boca Juniors, until the December 2025. The loan included an option for a permanent move, but on 4 November 2025 it was announced that the club would not be exercising the clause.

== Career statistics ==
=== Club ===
As of 14 November 2025

Club	Season	League			Cup		Continental		Other		Total	
Club	Season	Division	Apps	Goals	Apps	Goals	Apps	Goals	Apps	Goals	Apps	Goals
Boca Juniors	2021	Argentine Primera División	2	0	0	0	0	0	0	0	2	0
Independiente Rivadavia (loan)	2025	Argentine Primera División	1	0	0	0	0	0	0	0	1	0
Career total			3	0	0	0	0	0	0	0	3	0
