= Juan Antonini =

Argentine professional footballer

Personal information
- Date of birth: 4 March 1999 (age 27)
- Place of birth: General Villegas, Argentina
- Height: 1.85 m (6 ft 1 in)
- Position: Centre-back

Team information
- Current team: Estudiantes RC
- Number: 6

Youth career
- Eclipse Villegas
- River Plate
- Eclipse Villegas
- 2015–2019: Sarmiento

Senior career*
Years	Team	Apps	(Gls)
2019–2021	Sarmiento	7	(0)
2021–2024	Coruxo	50	(2)
2024–2025	Colón	3	(0)
2025–	Estudiantes RC	58	(3)
- * Club domestic league appearances and goals as of 17:34, 8 November 2026 (UTC)

Juan Antonini (born 4 March 1999) is an Argentine professional footballer who plays as a centre-back for Estudiantes RC.

== Career ==
Antonini began in the youth set-up of local side Eclipse Villegas. He later left to join River Plate's academy, though only spent seven months with them before returning to his former club. In 2015, Antonini signed for Sarmiento. Iván Delfino moved Antonini into their first-team squad in the 2018–19 Primera B Nacional, with his professional debut coming in a victory away to Chacarita Juniors on 23 February 2019; having previously been an unused substitute for fixtures versus Santamarina and Temperley.

In August 2021, Antonini moved to Spanish Segunda División RFEF club Coruxo FC.

== Personal life ==
Antonini is the brother of Fermín and nephew of Rubén Piaggio, both of whom have been professional footballers. As were other family members, including his father and grandfather, for teams in the General Villegas region.

== Career statistics ==
As of 26 March 2019.

Appearances and goals by club, season and competition
Club	Season	League			Cup		Continental		Other		Total	
Club	Season	Division	Apps	Goals	Apps	Goals	Apps	Goals	Apps	Goals	Apps	Goals
Sarmiento	2018–19	Primera B Nacional	1	0	0	0	—		0	0	1	0
Career total			1	0	0	0	—		0	0	1	0
