= General Villegas Partido =

General Villegas Partido de General Conrado E. Villegas
- Department
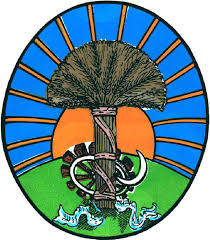
- Coat of arms

- location of General Villegas Partido in Buenos Aires Province
- Coordinates: 35°1.8′S 63°0.59′W
- Country: Argentina
- Established: June 28, 1877
- Founder: provincial law
- Seat: General Villegas

Government
  - Intendant: Gilberto Oscar Alegre (Encuentro Republicano Federal)

Area
  - Total: 7,232 km^{2} (2,792 sq mi)

Population
  - Total: 28,960
  - Density: 4.004/km^{2} (10.37/sq mi)
- Demonym: villegense
- Postal Code: B6230
- IFAM: BUE057
- Area Code: 03388
- Website: www.villegas.gov.ar

General Villegas Partido is the northwesternmost partido of Buenos Aires Province in Argentina.

The provincial subdivision has a population of about 29,000 inhabitants in an area of 7,232 km^{2} (2,792 sq mi), making it the fourth-largest partido in Buenos Aires Province. Its capital city is General Villegas, which is 410 km (255 mi) from Buenos Aires.

== Famous residents ==
- Manuel Puig (1932–1990), Argentine Writer

== Settlements ==
- General Villegas (pop. 16,270)
- Piedritas, (pop. 1,822)
- Emilio V. Bunge, (pop. 1,595)
- Coronel Charlone, (pop. 1,403)
- Banderaló, (pop. 1,315)
- Cañada Seca, (pop. 743)
- Villa Sauze, (pop. 581)
- Santa Regina, (pop. 533)
- Villa Saboya, (pop. 327)
- Santa Eleodora, (pop. 250)
- Massey Est. Elordi, (pop. 76)
- Pichincha, (pop. 24)
