= Facundo Juárez =

Argentine footballer

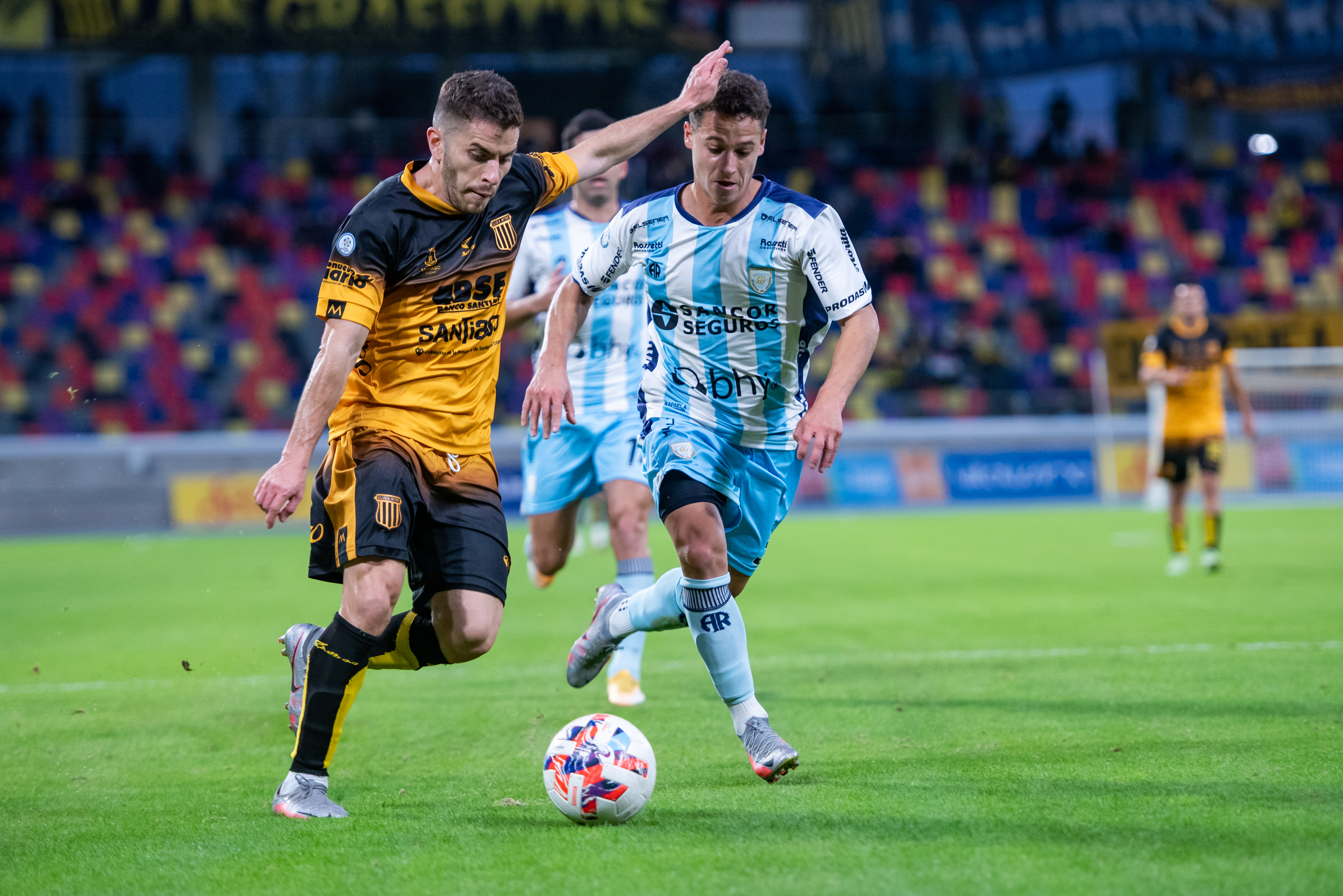
- Juárez with Mitre in 2022

Personal information
- Full name: Facundo Daniel Juárez
- Date of birth: November 8, 1993 (age 33)
- Place of birth: Santiago del Estero, Argentina
- Height: 1.66 m (5 ft 5 1/2 in)
- Position: Midfielder

Team information
- Current team: San Luis

Senior career*
Years	Team	Apps	(Gls)
2015–2017	Mitre	64	(8)
2017–2018	Celaya	29	(3)
2018–2020	Dorados	41	(1)
2020–2023	Mitre	70	(8)
2024	Deportes Limache	32	(6)
2025	San Luis	21	(3)
2026	Racing de Córdoba	6	(0)
2026–	San Luis	0	(0)
- * Club domestic league appearances and goals as of 17:03, 4 May 2026 (UTC)

Facundo Daniel Juárez (born November 8, 1993) is an Argentine professional footballer who plays as a midfielder for Chilean club San Luis de Quillota.

== Career ==
From 2017 to 2020, Juárez played in Mexico for both Celaya and Dorados de Sinaloa.

In 2024, Juárez moved to Chile and joined Deportes Limache in the Primera B. The next season, he switched to San Luis de Quillota.

Back to Argentina with Racing de Córdoba, Juárez returned to San Luis de Quillota for the second half of 2026.
