= Martín Garnerone =

Argentine professional footballer (born 1998)

Personal information
- Date of birth: 29 September 1998 (age 28)
- Place of birth: Río Tercero, Argentina
- Position: Forward

Team information
- Current team: Estudiantes RC
- Number: 11

Youth career
- Independiente Río Tercero
- 2016–2019: Belgrano

Senior career*
Years	Team	Apps	(Gls)
2019–2025	Belgrano	1	(0)
2021	→ Racing de Córdoba (loan)	28	(13)
2022	→ Chaco For Ever (loan)	34	(7)
2023	→ Estudiantes de Caseros (loan)	31	(6)
2024	→ San Luis (loan)	27	(5)
2025–	Estudiantes RC	60	(7)
- * Club domestic league appearances and goals as of 17:48, 8 November 2026 (UTC)

Martín Garnerone (born 29 September 1998) is an Argentine professional footballer who plays as a forward for Estudiantes RC.

== Career ==
Garnerone's career started with Independiente Río Tercero, which preceded the forward joining Belgrano's ranks in 2016. He made the breakthrough under interim manager Julio Constantín ahead of the 2019 Copa de la Superliga, as Belgrano met Lanús across two legs. Garnerone was an unused substitute as the club won the first leg 3–2, but subsequently made his debut in the second leg on 20 April 2019 at the Estadio Ciudad de Lanús – Néstor Díaz Pérez; replacing Gonzalo Lencina after sixty-one minutes, with Lanús overturning the deficit to advance.

In April 2021, Garnerone was loaned out to Torneo Federal A side Racing de Córdoba until the end of the year. Ahead of the 2022 season, he was loaned out again, this time to Primera Nacional club Chaco For Ever for one year.

In 2024, he moved to Chile and joined on loan to San Luis de Quillota.

== Career statistics ==
As of 20 April 2019.

Appearances and goals by club, season and competition
Club	Season	League			Cup		League Cup		Continental		Other		Total	
Club	Season	Division	Apps	Goals	Apps	Goals	Apps	Goals	Apps	Goals	Apps	Goals	Apps	Goals
Belgrano	2018–19	Primera División	0	0	0	0	1	0	—		0	0	1	0
Career total			0	0	0	0	1	0	—		0	0	1	0
