= Estadio Ciudad de Río Cuarto =

Football stadium in Rio Cuarto, Argentina

City of Río Cuarto Stadium
- Estadio Ciudad de Río Cuarto
- Interactive map of City of Río Cuarto Stadium
- Full name: Estadio Ciudad de Río Cuarto Antonio Candini
- Address: Av. España Nte. 314; Río Cuarto; Argentina
- Coordinates: 33.1149°S 64.3477°W
- Owner: Estudiantes (RC)
- Operator: Estudiantes (RC)
- Capacity: 12,000
- Type: Stadium
- Surface: Grass
- Current use: Football

Construction
- Opened: 12 October 1938; 88 years ago

Tenant
- Estudiantes (RC)

Estadio Ciudad de Río Cuarto Antonio Candini is a football stadium located in the city of Río Cuarto in Córdoba Province, Argentina. It is owned by local club Estudiantes, which uses it as home venue for its football teams.

The stadium, with capacity for 12,000 spectators, was named after Antonio Candini (d. 1992), regarded as one of the most notable executives in the history of the Estudiantes. Candini was president (1974–78) of the club, then serving in other departments of the institution.

== History ==
The stadium was inaugurated on 12 October 1938 in a match where Estudiantes easily defeated Club Argentino of Marcos Juárez 8–1. The first concrete grandstand was inaugurated in August 1959 in a friendly match vs Newell's Old Boys.

A lighting system was added in January 1961 in a night match v Chacarita Juniors. A new grandstand was built on the west side (Av. España), being inaugurated in May 1966 in a friendly v Club Atlético Independiente. The match (won by Independiente 3–0) set a record attendance for the venue, with more m$n2 million in tickets sold.

The facility inaugurated its renovated locker rooms (placed under the west stand) in 1975. A new stand was opened on the south side in early 2010, while the lighting system was renovated in 2020, being replaced by LED devices.
