= Alejandro Gutiérrez Arango =

Colombian footballer (born 1995)

Alejandro Gutiérrez
Personal information
- Full name: Alejandro Gutiérrez Arango
- Date of birth: 2 January 1995 (age 31)
- Place of birth: Envigado, Colombia
- Height: 1.92 m (6 ft 4 in)
- Position: Defender

Team information
- Current team: Deportivo Madryn

Youth career
- Envigado
- Ferroválvulas
- Quilmes

Senior career*
Years	Team	Apps	(Gls)
2016–2017	Quilmes	0	(0)
2016	→ Berazategui (loan)		
2016–2017	→ Berazategui (loan)		
2017–2018	Berazategui		
2018–2019	Deportivo Riestra	4	(0)
2019–2020	Acassuso	12	(0)
2020–2021	Excursionistas	14	(0)
2021	Bogotá FC	18	(1)
2022	Independiente Santa Fe	8	(0)
2023–2024	Gimnasia Mendoza	32	(2)
2025–	Deportivo Madryn	17	(3)
- * Club domestic league appearances and goals as of 17:00, 3 August 2025 (UTC)

Alejandro Gutiérrez Arango (born 2 January 1995) is a Colombian professional footballer who plays as a defender for Deportivo Madryn in the Primera Nacional in Argentina.

== Club career ==
Gutiérrez began his career in his homeland with hometown team Envigado, prior to sealing a move to Ferroválvulas. He soon switched Colombia for Argentina, joining Quilmes' youth ranks. In January 2016, Gutiérrez was loaned to Berazategui. He returned to Quilmes in June, though would rejoin Berazategui on loan in August. The Primera C Metropolitana outfit signed Gutiérrez permanently eleven months later. After spending 2017–18 there, taking his overall tally to thirty-six games and one goal, Gutiérrez joined Primera B Metropolitana's Deportivo Riestra on 16 July 2018. His bow didn't arrive until February versus San Miguel.

== International career ==
Gutiérrez, whilst with Quilmes, received a call-up from the Colombia U20s.

== Career statistics ==
As of 30 May 2019.

Appearances and goals by club, season and competition
Club	Season	League			Cup		League Cup		Continental		Other		Total	
Club	Season	Division	Apps	Goals	Apps	Goals	Apps	Goals	Apps	Goals	Apps	Goals	Apps	Goals
Quilmes	2016	Primera División	0	0	0	0	—		—		0	0	0	0
Quilmes	2016–17	Primera División	0	0	0	0	—		—		0	0	0	0
Quilmes	Total		0	0	0	0	—		—		0	0	0	0
Deportivo Riestra	2018–19	Primera B Metropolitana	4	0	0	0	—		—		0	0	4	0
Career total			4	0	0	0	—		—		0	0	4	0
