= Sebastian Ramírez (footballer, born 2000) =

Argentine footballer

Sebastián Ramírez
Personal information
- Full name: Francisco Sebastián Ramírez
- Date of birth: 4 September 2000 (age 26)
- Place of birth: San Pedro, Argentina
- Height: 1.80 m (5 ft 11 in)
- Position: Right winger

Team information
- Current team: Chacarita Juniors (on loan from Huracán)

Youth career
- Huracán

Senior career*
Years	Team	Apps	(Gls)
2020–	Huracán	47	(2)
2022	→ San Martín SJ (loan)	22	(2)
2023	→ Alvarado (loan)	31	(10)
2025	→ Estudiantes BA (loan)	26	(3)
2026–	→ Chacarita Juniors (loan)	3	(0)
- * Club domestic league appearances and goals as of 18:16, 1 April 2026 (UTC)

Francisco Sebastián Ramírez (born 4 September 2000) is an Argentine professional footballer who plays as a midfielder for Chacarita Juniors, on loan from Huracán.

== Club career ==
Ramírez made his professional debut with Huracán in a 1-1 Argentine Primera División tie with Gimnasia y Esgrima on 31 January 2020.

On 15 January 2022, Ramírez joined San Martín de San Juan on a loan deal until the end of 2022.
