= Banderaló =

- Town
- Location within Buenos Aires Province
- Coordinates: 35°00′S 63°21′W
- Country: Argentina
- Province: Buenos Aires
- Partidos: General Villegas
- Established: September 1, 1900
- Elevation: 117 m (384 ft)

Population (2001 Census)
  - Total: 1,315
- Time zone: UTC−3 (ART)
- CPA Base: B 6244
- Climate: Dfc

Banderaló is a town located in the General Villegas Partido in the province of Buenos Aires, Argentina. It is located close to the tripoint between the provinces of Buenos Aires, La Pampa and Córdoba.

== History ==
The area that would become the town was first settled in 1886 by a group of Argentine war veterans who were awarded the land by the government. The town itself was founded on September 1, 1900. On the same day, rail service on the Ferrocarril Oeste began.

In recent years, Banderaló, alongside other neighboring communities have seen an increase in flooding.

== Population ==
According to INDEC, which collects population data for the country, the town had a population of 1,315 people as of the 2001 census.
