= Leonardo Tambussi =

Argentine footballer

Personal information
- Full name: Leonardo Gabriel Tambussi
- Date of birth: 2 September 1981 (age 45)
- Place of birth: Mar Del Plata, Argentina
- Height: 1.80 m (5 ft 11 in)
- Position: Defender

Senior career*
Years	Team	Apps	(Gls)
2000–2002	Racing Club	31	(0)
2003	Arsenal de Sarandí	15	(0)
2003–2005	Racing Club	18	(0)
2005	Dorados	6	(0)
2006	Club Tijuana	13	(0)
2006–2008	Boavista	4	(0)
2008–2009	Portimonense	13	(0)
2009	Sportivo Desamparados	15	(0)
2010–2013	Alvarado		
2013–2015	Club América		
- * Club domestic league appearances and goals

Leonardo "Leo" Gabriel Tambussi (born 2 September 1981) is a retired football player from Mar del Plata in Buenos Aires Province, Argentina.

== Club career ==
Born in Mar del Plata, Tambussi began playing senior football with Racing Club. By age 19, he was a promising prospect as a central defender for Racing, however on his agent's advice, he refused to sign a new contract with Racing during the Clausura Torneo of the 2000–01 Argentine Primera División and was separated from the squad. After making an appeal to free himself from his existing contract, he had to accept the AFA's decision in favor of Racing and continue at the club.

Tambussi has also played for Arsenal de Sarandí in Argentina, and Dorados and Club Tijuana in Mexico.

Tambussi played in the Primeira Liga with Boavista F.C., but after suffering a serious knee injury during the 2007–08 season, he left the club for Liga de Honra side Portimonense S.C. in July 2008.
