= Luciano Cingolani =

Argentine professional footballer

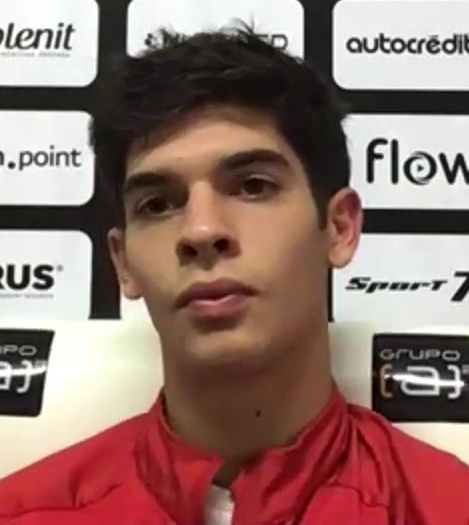

Personal information
- Full name: Luciano César Cingolani
- Date of birth: 6 April 2001 (age 25)
- Place of birth: Rosario, Argentina
- Height: 1.76 m (5 ft 9 in)
- Position: Right winger

Team information
- Current team: Gimnasia Mendoza
- Number: 7

Youth career
- Newell's Old Boys

Senior career*
Years	Team	Apps	(Gls)
2020–2023	Newell's Old Boys	16	(2)
2023–2025	Godoy Cruz	15	(0)
2025–	Gimnasia Mendoza	29	(2)

International career
2019	Argentina U18		
- * Club domestic league appearances and goals as of 16:35, 10 May 2026 (UTC)

Luciano César Cingolani (born 6 April 2001) is an Argentine professional footballer who plays as a winger for Gimnasia Mendoza.

== Club career ==
Cingolani joined the academy of Newell's Old Boys at the age of twelve. In November 2017, Cingolani was linked with a move to English club Manchester United. In August 2019, Cingolani signed his first professional contract; penning terms until June 2022. His senior debut would arrive sixteen months later, as the forward featured for the final fifteen minutes of a Copa de la Liga Profesional win over Central Córdoba on 28 December 2020; having replaced Jerónimo Cacciabue.

== International career ==
In July 2019, Cingolani received a call-up from the Argentina U18s.

== Career statistics ==
As of 4 January 2021.

Appearances and goals by club, season and competition
Club	Season	League			Cup		League Cup		Continental		Other		Total	
Club	Season	Division	Apps	Goals	Apps	Goals	Apps	Goals	Apps	Goals	Apps	Goals	Apps	Goals
Newell's Old Boys	2020–21 (Note: Soccerway counts Copa de la Liga Profesional appearances as league appearances.)	Primera División	2	0	0	0	0	0	—		0	0	2	0
Career total			2	0	0	0	0	0	—		0	0	2	0
