= Estadio Miguel Sancho =

Football stadium in Córdoba, Argentina

Miguel Sancho Stadium
- Estadio Miguel Sancho
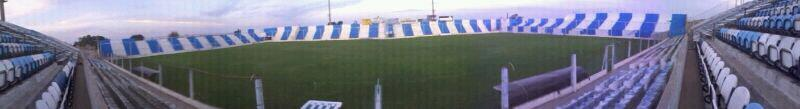
- Panoramic view of the stadium in 2012
- Interactive map of Miguel Sancho Stadium
- Address: Hernán Huberman 1750; Córdoba; Argentina
- Coordinates: 31.3895°S 64.1434°W
- Owner: C.A. Racing (C)
- Capacity: 15,000
- Type: Stadium
- Surface: Grass
- Field size: 105 x 79 m

Construction
- Opened: 27 May 1948; 78 years ago
- Renovated: 1984–85

Tenant
- Racing (C)

Estadio Miguel Sancho is a football stadium located in the city of Córdoba in the homonymous province of Argentina. It is owned and operated by local Club Atlético Racing and was opened in 1948. The stadium has a capacity of 15,000 spectators.

== History ==
The team played their home matches at the Unión Telefónica Stadium on Potosí street in the Barrio Inglés (current Barrio Pueyrredón). Inaugurated in June 1936, it was the first venue of C.A. Racing.

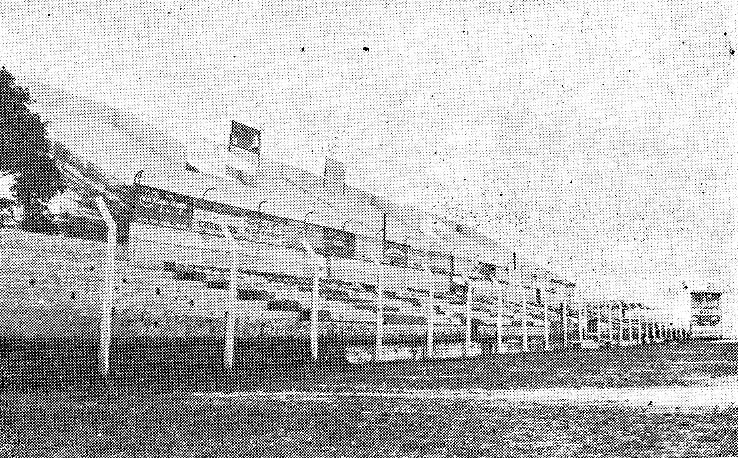
The stadium c. 1948

Architect Lange was the author of the project for a new stadium. That project was supervised by engineer Wieland. The grandstands were built by César Gervasi and Conrado Grotstchl. Works had a cost of m$n81,000.

The stadium was inaugurated on 27 May 1948 under the presidency of Rubén Monguzzi. Celebrations ended with a friendly match between Racing and Club Atlético Belgrano, champion of Liga Cordobesa. Racing won 4–3. The recently inaugurated venue had a 70 metre-width official grandstand for 4,000 spectators with 25 tiers, a popular stand (capacity of 2,000) with 12 tiers, and the stalls (capacity for 300 people).

In May 1976, the stadium was given the name "Miguel Sancho" as a tribute to a former president that leaded the club for 24 years. Mario Spirópulos (in office 1976–89) was the president by then.

The stadium was refurbished in 1984 under the presidency of Donato Antonacci. One year later, a lighting system was installed.
