= Federico Recalde =

Argentine footballer

Personal information
- Full name: Federico Nicolás Recalde
- Date of birth: 11 August 1996 (age 30)
- Place of birth: Campana, Argentina
- Position: Midfielder

Team information
- Current team: Deportivo Madryn

Youth career
- Villa Dálmine

Senior career*
Years	Team	Apps	(Gls)
2015–2021	Villa Dálmine	82	(3)
2021–2022	Atlético Rafaela	16	(0)
2022–	Deportivo Madryn	144	(3)
- * Club domestic league appearances and goals as of 16:43, 27 April 2026 (UTC)

Federico Nicolás Recalde (born 11 August 1996) is an Argentine professional footballer who plays as a midfielder for Deportivo Madryn.

== Career ==
Recalde's career began with Villa Dálmine. He was initially an unused substitute in the Copa Argentina against Tristán Suárez on 7 February 2015, with his professional debut arriving a month later in a Primera B Nacional defeat to Atlético Tucumán; a further appearance in 2015 arrived in October versus Unión Mar del Plata. His first senior goal came in his penultimate match of 2016, netting in a four-goal win away to Douglas Haig on 12 June 2016. In total, Recalde featured fifty-seven times and scored once in his opening four campaigns.

== Career statistics ==
As of 1 April 2019.

Appearances and goals by club, season and competition
Club	Season	League			Cup		Continental		Other		Total	
Club	Season	Division	Apps	Goals	Apps	Goals	Apps	Goals	Apps	Goals	Apps	Goals
Villa Dálmine	2015	Primera B Nacional	2	0	0	0	—		0	0	2	0
Villa Dálmine	2016	Primera B Nacional	13	1	0	0	—		0	0	13	1
Villa Dálmine	2016–17	Primera B Nacional	36	0	1	0	—		0	0	37	0
Villa Dálmine	2017–18	Primera B Nacional	5	0	0	0	—		0	0	5	0
Villa Dálmine	2018–19	Primera B Nacional	9	1	2	0	—		0	0	11	1
Career total			65	2	3	0	—		0	0	68	2
