= Yair Bonnín =

Argentine footballer

Personal information
- Full name: Yair Iván Bonnín
- Date of birth: 20 September 1990 (age 36)
- Place of birth: Villa Elisa, Argentina
- Height: 1.87 m (6 ft 2 in)
- Position: Goalkeeper

Team information
- Current team: Deportivo Madryn

Youth career
- CA Jorge Griffa
- Gimnasia y Esgrima

Senior career*
Years	Team	Apps	(Gls)
2010–2017	Gimnasia y Esgrima	6	(0)
2016–2017	→ Atlético Paraná (loan)	25	(0)
2018–2019	Rangers	20	(0)
2019–2020	Flandria	24	(0)
2020–2022	Mitre	4	(0)
2022–	Deportivo Madryn	109	(0)
2023	→ Rangers (loan)	29	(0)
- * Club domestic league appearances and goals as of 16:26, 27 April 2026 (UTC)

Yair Iván Bonnín (born 20 September 1990) is an Argentine professional footballer who plays as a goalkeeper for Deportivo Madryn.
