= Lucas Pruzzo =

Argentine footballer

Personal information
- Full name: Lucas Damián Pruzzo
- Date of birth: 6 July 1994 (age 32)
- Place of birth: Rosario del Tala, Argentina
- Height: 1.75 m (5 ft 9 in)
- Position: Left-back

Team information
- Current team: Chaco For Ever

Youth career
- –2011: Atlético Tala
- 2011–2017: Unión Santa Fe

Senior career*
Years	Team	Apps	(Gls)
2017	Unión Santa Fe	2	(0)
2017–2018	Guillermo Brown	6	(0)
2019	Atlético Tala		
2019–2020	Unión de Sunchales	17	(0)
2020–2021	Deportivo Armenio	24	(0)
2022–2023	Deportivo Madryn	43	(2)
2023–2024	Differdange	25	(2)
2024	Andratx		
2025–2026	Deportivo Madryn	6	(0)
2026–	Chaco For Ever	5	(0)
- * Club domestic league appearances and goals as of 17:49, 24 April 2026 (UTC)

Lucas Damián Pruzzo (born 6 July 1994) is an Argentine footballer who plays for Chaco For Ever.
