= Deportivo Madryn =

Argentine sports club

- Full name: Club Social y Deportivo Madryn
- Nicknames: Aurinegro; Depo
- Founded: 7 May 1924; 102 years ago
- Ground: Coliseo del Golfo (football); Palacio Aurinegro (basketball); Puerto Madryn, Argentina
- Capacity: 6000 (f); 3500 (b)
- Chairman: Ricardo Sastre
- Manager: Luis García
- League: Primera Nacional (football); Liga Patagónica de Básquetbol (basketball)
- 2025: Primera Nacional Zone A, 1st of 18
Home colours	Away colours	Third colours

Club Social y Deportivo Madryn (usually called simply Deportivo Madryn) is an Argentine sports club. Its home town is Puerto Madryn, in the Chubut Province. Although other sports are practised there, the club is mostly known for both its football and basketball teams.

== Football ==
Deportivo Madryn currently plays in the 2nd level of Argentine football league system, the Primera Nacional.

=== Current squad ===
As of 5 March 2026 Note: Flags indicate national team as defined under FIFA eligibility rules; some limited exceptions apply. Players may hold more than one non-FIFA nationality.

No.	Pos.	Nation	Player
1	GK	ARG	Yair Bonnín
2	DF	ARG	Thiago Yossen
3	DF	ARG	Rodrigo Ayala
4	DF	ARG	Agustín Sosa
5	MF	URU	Yvo Calleros
6	DF	ARG	Álvaro Dionisio
7	FW	ARG	Nicolás Servetto
8	MF	ARG	Federico Recalde (captain)
9	FW	PAR	Elías Ayala
11	MF	ARG	Nicolás Barrientos
12	GK	ARG	Matías Montero
14	DF	COL	Alejandro Gutiérrez
15	MF	ARG	Julián Cosi
16	MF	URU	Facundo Ospitaleche
17	DF	ARG	Diego Martínez
18	FW	COL	Camilo Machado

No.	Pos.	Nation	Player
19	FW	ARG	Pío Bonacci (on loan from Deportivo Armenio)
20	FW	ARG	Luis Silba
21	FW	COL	Mauricio Cuero
22	DF	ARG	Nicolás Ortiz
23	MF	ARG	Estanislao Jara
24	DF	ARG	Franco Godoy (on loan from Unión de Santa Fe)
25	MF	ARG	Marcelo Meli
28	FW	ARG	Nazareno Solís
29	DF	ARG	Facundo Giacopuzzi
32	FW	ARG	Ezequiel Montagna
35	FW	ARG	Juan Ignacio Peinipil
36	GK	ARG	Roberto León
77	FW	ARG	Yamil García
88	FW	ARG	Gabriel Gudiño

=== Other players under contract ===
Note: Flags indicate national team as defined under FIFA eligibility rules; some limited exceptions apply. Players may hold more than one non-FIFA nationality.

No.	Pos.	Nation	Player
26	GK	ARG	Mauricio Nievas
31	GK	ARG	Lucas Toffoletti (injured)

=== Reserve squad ===
Note: Flags indicate national team as defined under FIFA eligibility rules; some limited exceptions apply. Players may hold more than one non-FIFA nationality.

No.	Pos.	Nation	Player
30	DF	ARG	Joaquín Obdrzalek

=== Out on loan ===
Note: Flags indicate national team as defined under FIFA eligibility rules; some limited exceptions apply. Players may hold more than one non-FIFA nationality.

No.	Pos.	Nation	Player
10	MF	ARG	Thiago Nicolás (at Sarmiento de Junín until 31 December 2027)
27	MF	ARG	Bruno Pérez (at Asteras Tripolis F.C. until 31 December 2026)
33	DF	ARG	Lucas Pruzzo (at Chaco For Ever until 31 December 2026)

== Basketball ==
The basketball squad plays in the regional Liga Patagónica de Básquetbol. Madryn played three seasons in the Liga Nacional de Básquetbol (first division), but sold its spot at the end of the 2006–07 season for economic reasons.
