= Silvio Dulcich =

Argentine footballer

Personal information
- Full name: Silvio Marcos Dulcich
- Date of birth: 1 October 1981 (age 45)
- Place of birth: Río Cuarto, Argentina
- Height: 1.91 m (6 ft 3 in)
- Position: Goalkeeper

Team information
- Current team: Quilmes
- Number: 25

Youth career
- Boca Juniors

Senior career*
Years	Team	Apps	(Gls)
2002–2003	Boca Juniors	0	(0)
2004–2005	Huracán (TA)	8	(0)
2005–2007	Talleres	5	(0)
2008–2011	Aurora	130+	(0)
2011–	Quilmes	20	(0)
- * Club domestic league appearances and goals as of 12 April 2015

Silvio Marcos Dulcich (born 1 October 1981 in Río Cuarto, Córdoba) is an Argentine football goalkeeper of Croatian descent, currently playing for Quilmes in Argentine Primera División.

== Club title ==
Season	Club	Title
2008 (C)	Aurora	Liga de Fútbol Profesional Boliviano
