= Racing de Córdoba =

Argentine football club

Racing (C)
- Full name: Club Atlético Racing
- Nickname: La Academia Cordobesa
- Founded: 14 December 1924; 101 years ago
- Ground: Estadio Miguel Sancho, Córdoba, Argentina
- Capacity: 15,000
- Chairman: Manuel Ángel Pérez
- Manager: Hernán Medina
- League: Primera Nacional
- 2025: Primera Nacional Zone A, 11th of 18
- Website: https://racingcba.com.ar
Home colours	Away colours

Club Atlético Racing, known as Racing de Córdoba, is an Argentine sports club headquartered in the city of Córdoba. The football team currently plays in Primera Nacional, the regionalised second division of the Argentine football league system.

Apart from football, other sports practised at the club are basketball, volleyball, and rhythmic gymnastics.

== History ==
Racing was founded in the Nueva Italia district of Córdoba on 14 December 1924 using the name of Racing Club from Avellaneda, Buenos Aires Province. Its most successful season came in 1980 when the team finished 2nd in the Nacional championship, after losing the final matches at the hands of Rosario Central, with scores of 1–5 and 2–0 respectively (3–5 on aggregate).

At the end of the 2005–06 season the club narrowly missed out on promotion to the Primera B Nacional. Racing had to play San Martín de Tucumán in the Clausura final. After the game ended with an aggregate score of 3–3, the decision went to a penalty shootout which Racing lost 7–6.

== Players ==
=== Current squad ===
As of 6 March 2026 Note: Flags indicate national team as defined under FIFA eligibility rules; some limited exceptions apply. Players may hold more than one non-FIFA nationality.

No.	Pos.	Nation	Player
1	GK	ARG	Brian Olivera
2	DF	ARG	Alejandro Rébola
3	DF	ARG	Emanuel Diaz
4	DF	ARG	Santiago Rinaudo
5	MF	ARG	Alan Olinick
6	DF	ARG	Matías Sánchez
7	MF	ARG	Matías Machado
8	MF	ARG	Gaspar Iñíguez
9	FW	ARG	Pablo Chavarría (captain)
10	FW	ARG	Leandro Córdoba
11	FW	ARG	Luciano Viano (on loan from Talleres de Córdoba)
12	GK	ARG	Gonzalo Laborda (on loan from Ciudad de Bolívar)
13	DF	ARG	Gabriel Aranda (on loan from Boca Juniors)
14	DF	ARG	Tomás Kummer (on loan from Talleres de Córdoba)
16	DF	ARG	Raul Chamorro
17	MF	ARG	Luciano Catriel Peña

No.	Pos.	Nation	Player
18	FW	ARG	Sergio González
19	FW	ARG	Ignacio Valsangiácomo
20	FW	ARG	Ricardo Centurión
22	MF	ARG	Francisco Monticelli (on loan from Belgrano)
23	DF	ARG	Ciro Rivas
24	FW	ARG	Facundo Taborda (on loan from Colón de Santa Fe)
25	GK	ARG	Lucas Soto
26	GK	ARG	Valentín Dutruel
27	MF	ARG	Facundo Juárez
30	DF	ARG	Lucas Flores
31	DF	ARG	Fabrizio Ghiggia
32	MF	ARG	Abel Bustos
34	MF	ARG	Fernando Ortiz
35	DF	ARG	Francisco Martín

=== Other players under contract ===
Note: Flags indicate national team as defined under FIFA eligibility rules; some limited exceptions apply. Players may hold more than one non-FIFA nationality.

No.	Pos.	Nation	Player
29	DF	ARG	Marcio Gómez (injured)

=== Reserve squad ===
Note: Flags indicate national team as defined under FIFA eligibility rules; some limited exceptions apply. Players may hold more than one non-FIFA nationality.

No.	Pos.	Nation	Player
—	DF	ARG	Guido Pache
—	MF	ARG	Exequiel Oviedo
—	MF	ARG	Martin Szumik
—	FW	AUS	Alfie Leo James

=== Out on loan ===
Note: Flags indicate national team as defined under FIFA eligibility rules; some limited exceptions apply. Players may hold more than one non-FIFA nationality.

No.	Pos.	Nation	Player
21	MF	ARG	Gonzalo Rostagno (at Orense S.C. until 31 December 2026)
36	DF	ARG	Martin Albarracin (at Estudiantes de Buenos Aires until 31 December 2026)
37	MF	ARG	Axel Oyola (at Deportivo Rincón until 31 December 2026)

== Honours ==
=== National ===
- Torneo Federal A
  - Winners (1): 2022
- Torneo Argentino A
  - Winners (2): 1998-99, 2003–04
- Torneo Regional Federal Amateur
  - Winners (1): 2020–21
- Torneo Federal B
  - Winners (1): 2017
- Torneo Argentino B
  - Winners (1): 1998-99

=== Regional ===
- Liga Cordobesa de Fútbol (Primera División)
  - Winners (8): 1962, 1965, 1967, 1980, 1981, 1994, 2004, 2019
- Liga Cordobesa de Fútbol (Segunda División)
  - Winners (3): 1934, 1942, 2015
- Liga Cordobesa de Fútbol (Tercera División)
  - Winners (1): 1925
- Torneo Neder Nicola
  - Winners (2): 1973, 1981
- Copa Córdoba
  - Winners (1): 1981
- Copa Desafío Córdoba
  - Winners (1): 2008
- Copa "Sesentenario" Sunchales
  - Winners (1): 2008

=== Friendly ===
- President's Cup (1): 1981
