= General Villegas =

- Town
- Location in Argentina
- Coordinates: 35°02′S 63°01′W
- Country: Argentina
- Province: Buenos Aires
- Partido: General Villegas
- Elevation: 105 m (344 ft)

Population (2001 census [INDEC])
  - Total: 16,270
- CPA Base: B 6230
- Area code: +54 3388

General Villegas is a town in General Villegas Partido, Buenos Aires Province, Argentina.

UN/LOCODE is ARVGS.

== Climate ==
Climate data for General Villegas (1941–1950)
Month	Jan	Feb	Mar	Apr	May	Jun	Jul	Aug	Sep	Oct	Nov	Dec	Year
Record high °C (°F)	42.6 (108.7)	42.6 (108.7)	35.6 (96.1)	34.0 (93.2)	31.6 (88.9)	26.0 (78.8)	28.0 (82.4)	33.4 (92.1)	37.4 (99.3)	35.2 (95.4)	38.8 (101.8)	41.4 (106.5)	42.6 (108.7)
Mean daily maximum °C (°F)	32.7 (90.9)	31.6 (88.9)	26.5 (79.7)	23.2 (73.8)	19.2 (66.6)	15.5 (59.9)	15.4 (59.7)	17.2 (63.0)	20.8 (69.4)	24.3 (75.7)	29.0 (84.2)	32.1 (89.8)	24.0 (75.2)
Daily mean °C (°F)	24.9 (76.8)	23.8 (74.8)	19.0 (66.2)	15.8 (60.4)	11.9 (53.4)	8.5 (47.3)	8.2 (46.8)	9.5 (49.1)	12.9 (55.2)	16.4 (61.5)	21.0 (69.8)	23.9 (75.0)	16.3 (61.3)
Mean daily minimum °C (°F)	15.9 (60.6)	15.3 (59.5)	12.4 (54.3)	9.2 (48.6)	6.2 (43.2)	3.0 (37.4)	2.3 (36.1)	3.4 (38.1)	5.9 (42.6)	8.9 (48.0)	11.4 (52.5)	14.8 (58.6)	9.1 (48.4)
Record low °C (°F)	5.1 (41.2)	4.8 (40.6)	0.0 (32.0)	−2.0 (28.4)	−5.0 (23.0)	−10.0 (14.0)	−11.0 (12.2)	−9.2 (15.4)	−3.0 (26.6)	−3.0 (26.6)	−1.0 (30.2)	0.0 (32.0)	−11.0 (12.2)
Average precipitation mm (inches)	66 (2.6)	96 (3.8)	129 (5.1)	65 (2.6)	40 (1.6)	23 (0.9)	28 (1.1)	20 (0.8)	36 (1.4)	68 (2.7)	55 (2.2)	78 (3.1)	704 (27.7)
Source: Sistema de Clasificación Bioclimática Mundial
