= 1995 Copa CONMEBOL finals =

- Event: 1995 Copa CONMEBOL
Atlético Mineiro	Rosario Central
(Brazil)	(Argentina)
4	4
- (on aggregate; Rosario Central won 4–3 on penalties)

First leg
Atlético Mineiro	Rosario Central
4	0
- Date: December 12, 1995
- Venue: Mineirão, Minas Gerais
- Referee: Oscar Velázquez (Paraguay)
- Attendance: 55,000

Second leg
Rosario Central	Atlético Mineiro
4	0
- Date: December 19, 1995
- Venue: Gigante de Arroyito, Rosario
- Attendance: 45,000

The 1995 Copa CONMEBOL finals were the final match series to decide the winner of the 1995 Copa CONMEBOL, a continental cup competition organised by CONMEBOL. The final was contested by Argentine club Rosario Central and Brazilian Clube Atlético Mineiro.

Played under a two-legged tie system, Atlético Mineiro won the first leg held in Mineirão Stadium in Minas Gerais, while Rosario Central won the second leg at Estadio Gigante de Arroyito. As both matches had similar scores (4–0), a penalty shoot-out was carried out to decide a champion. Rosario Central won 4–3 on penalties, thus the club from Rosario achieved its first international title. With the title won, the argentine club qualified for the 1996 Copa de Oro,

The performance of Rosario Central was highly praised by the Argentine media, which recognised how the team overcame to the big defeat in the first leg to force a penalty shoot out and finally to win the Cup. "Huge achievement" was the most used term for that victory, which is regarded by Rosario Central fans as one of their greatest achievements ever.

== Qualified teams ==
Team	Previous final app.
(Argentina) Rosario Central	(none)
(Brazil) Atlético Mineiro	**1992**

- **Bold** indicates winning years

== Venues ==
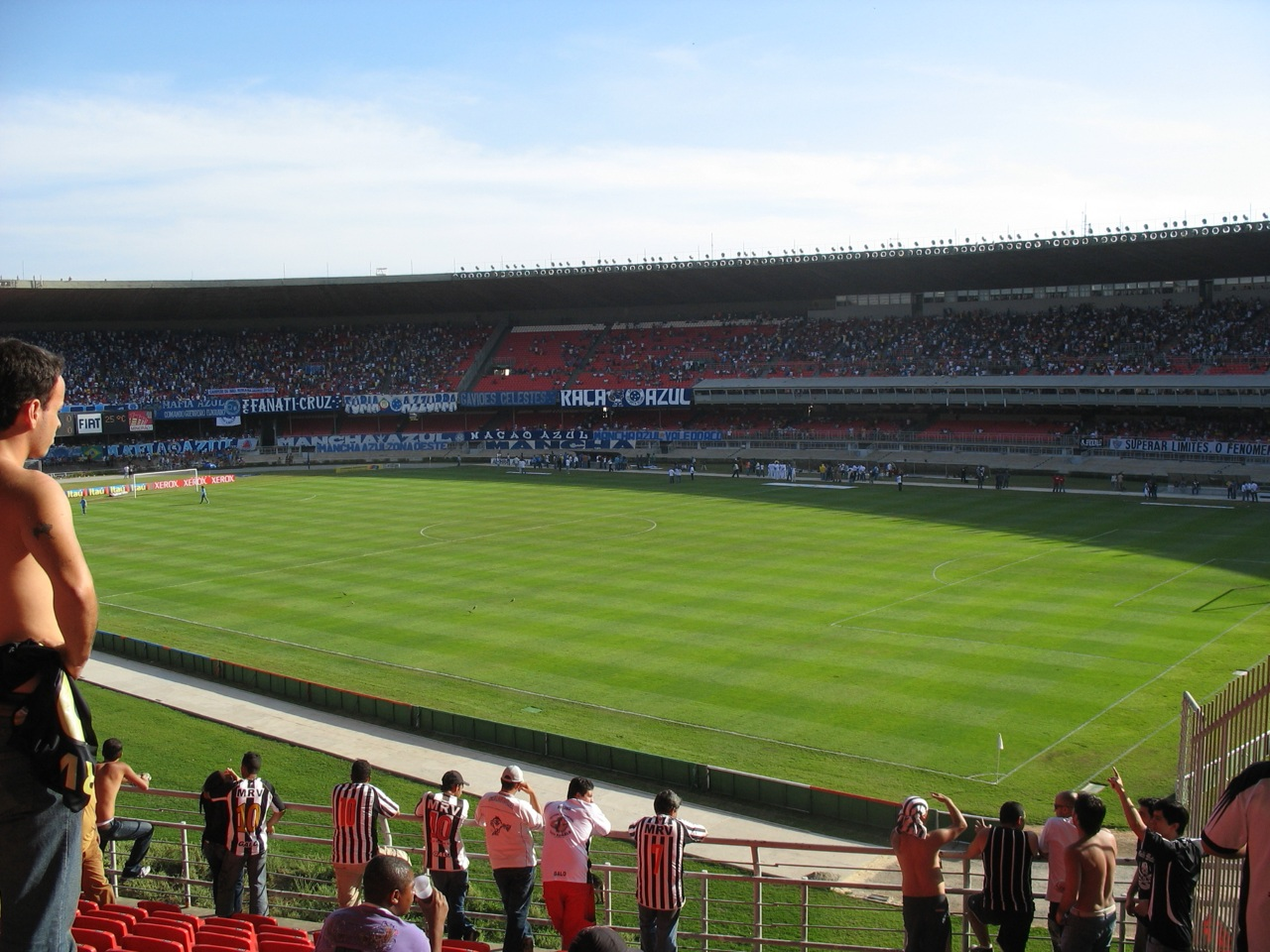
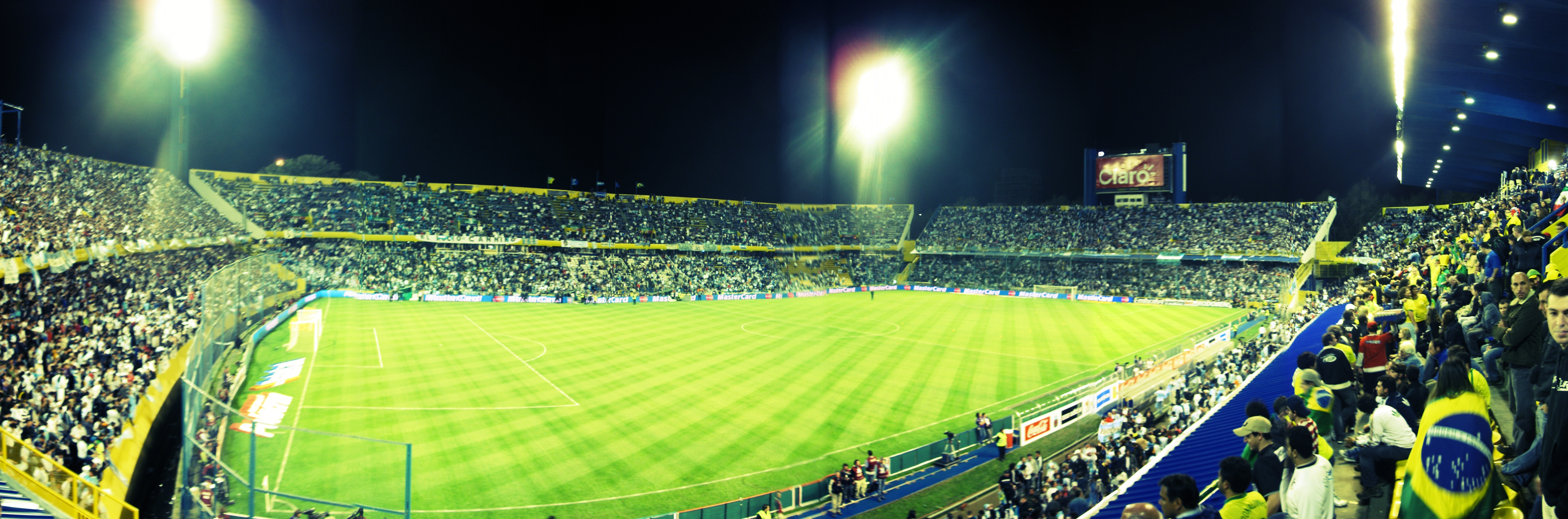
Mineirao (left) and Gigante de Arroyito, venues for the series

== Route to the final ==
Note: In all scores below, the score of the home team is given first.

(Argentina) Rosario Central			Round	(Brazil) Atlético Mineiro		
Opponent	Venue	Score		Opponent	Venue	Score
(Uruguay) Defensor Sporting (won 5–2 on aggregate)	Away	1–3	First round	(Brazil) Guaraní (won 2–1 on aggregate)	Home	1–1
(Uruguay) Defensor Sporting (won 5–2 on aggregate)	Home	2–1	First round	(Brazil) Guaraní (won 2–1 on aggregate)	Away	0–1
(Chile) Cobreloa (won 5–1 on aggregate)	Home	2–0	Quarter-finals	(Venezuela) Mineros (won 10–0 on aggregate)	Home	6–0
(Chile) Cobreloa (won 5–1 on aggregate)	Away	1–3	Quarter-finals	(Venezuela) Mineros (won 10–0 on aggregate)	Away	0–4
(Paraguay) Atlético Colegiales (won 5–1 on aggregate)	Away	0–2	Semi-finals	(Colombia) América de Cali (tied 0–0 on aggregate, won on penalties)	Away	4–3
(Paraguay) Atlético Colegiales (won 5–1 on aggregate)	Home	3–1	Semi-finals	(Colombia) América de Cali (tied 0–0 on aggregate, won on penalties)	Home	1–0 (4–3 p)

== Match details ==
=== First leg ===
1995 Copa CONMEBOL Final
December 12, 1995
Final – First leg

Atlético Mineiro (Brazil)	4–0	(Argentina) Rosario Central
Ézio 7'; Cairo 54'; Paulo Roberto 59'; Elpídio Silva 88'	Report

Mineirão, Belo Horizonte
Attendance: 55,000
Referee: Óscar Velázquez (Paraguay)

**At. Mineiro**	**Rosario Central**

GK	1	(Brazil) Cláudio Taffarel (c)
DF		(Brazil) Alcir
DF	15	(Brazil) Ademir
DF	4	(Brazil) Ronaldo Guiaro
DF	6	(Brazil) Paulo Roberto
MF	25	(Brazil) Éder Lopes
MF	8	(Brazil) Doriva
MF		(Brazil) Cairo	Substituted off
MF	11	(Brazil) Leandro Tavares
FW	7	(Brazil) Renaldo	Substituted off
FW	9	(Brazil) Ézio	Substituted off
Substitutes:
FW		(Brazil) Elpídio Silva	Substituted on
MF		(Brazil) Carlos	Substituted on
MF		(Brazil) Julio César	Substituted on
Manager:
(Brazil) Procópio Cardoso

GK	12	(Argentina) Roberto Bonano
DF	4	(Argentina) Diego Ordóñez	Substituted off
DF	6	(Argentina) Federico Lussenhoff
DF	2	(Argentina) Horacio Carbonari
DF	15	(Argentina) Patricio Graff
MF	22	(Argentina) Eduardo Coudet
MF	5	(Argentina) Christian Daniele
MF	10	(Argentina) Omar Palma (c)
MF	11	(Argentina) Raúl Gordillo
MF	20	(Argentina) Pablo A. Sánchez
FW	9	(Uruguay) Rubén da Silva
Substitutes:
FW	17	(Argentina) Martín Cardetti	Substituted on
Manager:
(Argentina) Ángel Tulio Zof

=== Second leg ===
December 19, 1995
Final – Second leg

Rosario Central (Argentina)	4–0	(Brazil) Atlético Mineiro
Da Silva 23'; Carbonari 39', 88'; Cardetti 40'	Report
Penalties
Palma (penalty scored); Pobersnik (penalty scored); Carbonari (penalty scored); Colusso (penalty missed); Da Silva (penalty scored)	4–3	(penalty missed) Doriva; (penalty missed) Tavares; (penalty scored) Guiaro; (penalty scored) Taffarel; (penalty scored) Euller

Gigante de Arroyito, Rosario
Attendance: 45,000

**Rosario Central**	**At. Mineiro**

GK	12	(Argentina) Roberto Bonano
DF	4	(Argentina) Diego Ordóñez	Substituted off
DF	2	(Argentina) Horacio Carbonari
DF	6	(Argentina) Federico Lussenhoff
DF	15	(Argentina) Patricio Graff
MF	22	(Argentina) Eduardo Coudet	Substituted off
MF	10	(Argentina) Omar Palma (c)
MF	11	(Argentina) Raúl Gordillo	Substituted off
MF	20	(Argentina) Pablo A. Sánchez
FW	9	(Uruguay) Rubén da Silva
MF	17	(Argentina) Martín Cardetti
Substitutes:
DF	12	(Argentina) Cristian Colusso	Substituted on
MF	12	(Argentina) Cristian Daniele	Substituted on
FW	18	(Argentina) Mario Pobersnik	Substituted on
Manager:
(Argentina) Ángel Tulio Zof

GK	1	(Brazil) Cláudio Taffarel (c)
DF	2	(Brazil) Dinho
DF	15	(Brazil) Ademir
DF	4	(Brazil) Ronaldo Guiaro
DF	6	(Brazil) Paulo Roberto
MF	25	(Brazil) Éder Lopes
MF	8	(Brazil) Doriva
MF	5	(Brazil) Carlos	Substituted off
MF	11	(Brazil) Leandro Tavares
FW	7	(Brazil) Renaldo	Substituted off
FW	9	(Brazil) Ézio	Substituted off
Substitutes:
DF	14	(Brazil) Dedé	Substituted on
MF	19	(Brazil) Gutemberg	Substituted on
GK	16	(Brazil) Euller	Substituted on
Manager:
(Brazil) Procópio Cardoso

== See also ==
- 1995 Copa CONMEBOL
