= Rosario derby =

Argentine football rivalry

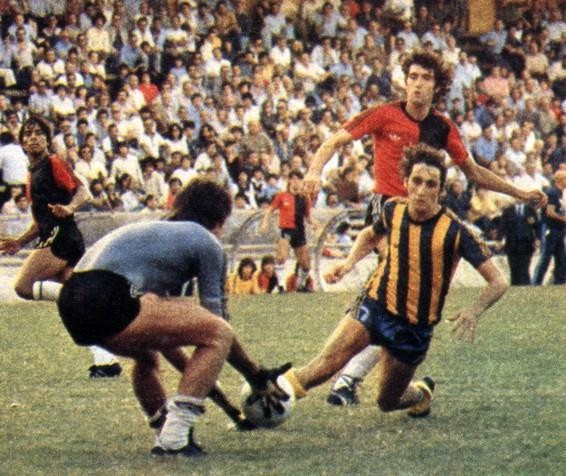
- Scene of the match played on April 25, 1982

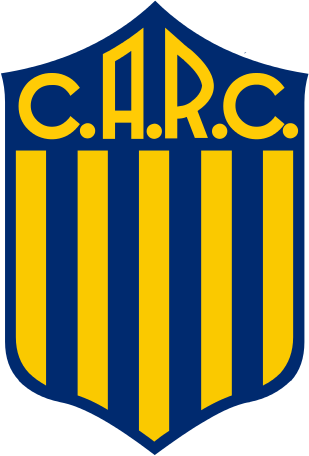
- Rosario Central Newell's Old Boys
- Sport: Association football
- Location: Rosario
- First meeting: 18 June 1905; Liga Rosarina de Football; Newell's 1–0 R. Central
- Latest meeting: 6 September 2026; 2026 Clausura; R. Central 1–1 Newell's
- Stadiums: Gigante Arroyito (R. Central); Marcelo Bielsa (Newell's)

Statistics
- Total meetings: 281
- Most wins: Rosario Central (99)
- Most player appearances: José J. González (45)
- Top scorer: Manuel González (30)
- Largest victory: Newell's 0–9 R. Central (Copa Vila, 29 Jul 1917)

The Rosario derby ("Clásico Rosarino") is the oldest and one of the most fiercely contested football rivalries in Argentine football. Is considered one of the most intense and dangerous derbies in Argentina, given the history of clashes between the Barra bravas —and with the police— that have resulted in serious injuries and even fatalities.

It is played between the two main teams from Rosario, Newell's Old Boys and Rosario Central. It is widely regarded as the most important Argentine derby outside of Buenos Aires and the Buenos Aires Province.

== History ==
The first Rosario derby was played on June 18, 1905; it resulted in a 1–0 win for Newell's Old Boys with a goal from Faustino González.

The clubs continued to play each other in the "Liga Rosarina de Fútbol" for many years. In 1939 the two clubs were admitted to the Argentine Primera, and the first game at this level resulted in a 1–1 draw on June 18, 1939.

Experts claim that the Mexican Monterrey derby holds similarities with the Rosario derby. The teams are crosstown rivals from cities away from the capital and have passionate fans.

Rosario Central has the edge over Newell's, with 99 wins compared to 77 counting every official encounter. Rosario also has more trophies, with 36 against 25, although Newell's has won the league title six times, one more than Rosario Central.

== Nicknames ==
The teams' nicknames relate from the incident where Rosario Central refused to play a charity game for a leprosy charity, hence their nickname "Canallas' (Scoundrels). Newell's Old Boys stepped in to play the game and earned the nickname "Los Leprosos" (The Lepers).

== List of matches ==
=== Primera División ===
#	Season	Round	Venue	Winner	Score	Goals (home team)	Goals (away team)
1	1939	1	Newell's	(Draw)	1–1	Perucca (55')	Barrios (65')
2	1939	2	R. Central	(Draw)	1–1	Grassi (69')	Pairoux (52')
3	1940	1	Newell's	R. Central	3–1	Gómez (27')	Heredia (43'), Maffei (51'), E. Hayes (89')
4	1940	2	R. Central	Newell's	2–0		Ferreyra (22'), Dorado (63')
5	1941	1	R. Central	Newell's	1–0		Pontoni (6')
6	1941	2	Newell's	Newell's	5–0	Morosano (35', 38', 75'), Pontoni (68', 76')	
7	1943	1	Newell's	R. Central	1–0		Funes (62)
8	1943	2	R. Central	(Draw)	1–1	Reynoso (47')	Fiore (6')
9	1944	1	R. Central	Newell's	3–1	Funes (57')	Ferreyra (26'), Cirico (59'), Fiore (82')
10	1944	2	Newell's	(Draw)	1–1	Pontoni (67')	Olivares (40')
11	1945	1	R. Central	R. Central	2–0	Aguirre (36'), Santos (73')	Ferreyra (26'), Cirico (59'), Fiore (82')
12	1945	2	Newell's	Newell's	1–0	Runzer (36')	
13	1946	1	Newell's	Newell's	3–2	Runzer (54', 71'), Buján (56')	Geronis (2'), Aguirre (80')
14	1946	2	R. Central	R. Central	3–2	Geronis (36', 45'), Santos (57')	Moyano (1', 43')
15	1947	1	Newell's	Newell's	4–2	Moyano (19'), Toledo (23'), López (39'), Benavídez (64')	Hohberg (12'), Pérez (85')
16	1947	2	R. Central	(Draw)	1–1	Santos (60')	Medina (42')
17	1948	1	Newell's	Newell's	2–0	Giosa (38'), Moyano (88')	
18	1948	2	Newell's	R. Central	3–2	La Spina (2', 61'), Cazaubón (4')	Peloso (16'), Alarcón (73')
19	1949	1	R. Central	Newell's	3–2	Bravo (13', 57')	Benavídez (6', 46', 71')
20	1949	2	Newell's	(Draw)	2–2	Benavídez (53'), Contini (90')	Vilariño (10'), Bravo (25')
21	1950	1	Newell's	R. Central	4–3	Contini (3', 39'), Montaño (68')	L'Epíscopo (6', 78'), Aguirre (25', 61')
22	1950	2	R. Central	(Draw)	1–1	Aguirre (12')	Mardiza (34')
23	1952	1	R. Central	(Draw)	0–0		
24	1952	2	Newell's	R. Central	2–0		Gauna (50'), Portaluppi (52')
25	1953	1	Newell's	R. Central	3–1	Carranza (19')	Gauna (11', 44', 82')
26	1953	2	R. Central	(Draw)	0–0		
27	1954	1	R. Central	R. Central	2–0	Fiore (5'), L'Epíscopo (69')	
28	1954	2	Newell's	Newell's	3–2	Bernardo (28', 63'), Belén (79')	Massei (34'), Gauna (84')
29	1955	1	R. Central	(Draw)	1–1	Massei (14')	Ramaciotti (69')
30	1955	2	Newell's	R. Central	2–1	Bellotti (7')	Appicciafuocco (19'), Massei (28')
31	1956	1	Newell's	Newell's	2–0	Biagioli (7', o.g.), Nardiello (58')	
32	1956	2	R. Central	Newell's	2–1	Giménez (13')	Belén (55'), Pereyra (75')
33	1957	1	Newell's	(Draw)	1–1	Berón (66')	Juárez (46')
34	1957	2	R. Central	R. Central	3–1	Mottura (8'), Giménez (34'), Juárez (53')	Yudica (52')
35	1958	1	Newell's	(Draw)	1–1	Griffa (19')	Galván (77, o.g.)
36	1958	2	R. Central	R. Central	1–0	Castro (67')	
37	1959	1	R. Central	(Draw)	0–0		
38	1959	2	Newell's	Newell's	1–0	Sacchi (47')	
39	1960	1	Newell's	Newell's	5–3	Zurita (46'), Sacchi (48'), Lallana (72', 89'), Sosa (79')	Cardoso (5'), Rodrígues (25', 73')
40	1960	2	R. Central	R. Central	4–1	Castro (42'), F. Rodrígues (55'), A. Rodrígues (62'), Pagani (89')	Muñoz (22')
41	1964	1	Newell's	R. Central	4–0		Malleo (2', 85'), Borgogno (20'), Medina (60')
42	1964	2	R. Central	(Draw)	2–2	Manfredi (60', 70')	Da Silva Zucca (9'), João Cardoso (23')
43	1965	1	Newell's	Newell's	1–0	Belén (80')	
44	1965	2	R. Central	Newell's	1–0		João Cardoso (62')
45	1966	1	R. Central	(Draw)	0–0		
46	1966	2	Newell's	R. Central	2–0		Pignani (5'), Poy (80')
47	1967 Met.	1	R. Central	R. Central	1–0	Bielli (74')	
48	1967 Met.	2	Newell's	R. Central	2–1	Avallay (41')	Giribet (17'), Poy (32')
49	1968 Met.	1	R. Central	(Draw)	1–1	Miranda (6')	Fernández (27')
50	1968 Met.	2	Newell's	(Draw)	1–1	Mesiano (13')	Fernández (26')
51	1969	1	R. Central	(Draw)	2–2	Enzo Gennoni (14'), Pacheco (75')	Montes (47'), Avallay (71')
52	1969	2	Newell's	(Draw)	0–0		
53	1969	Clasif.	Newell's	Newell's	1–0	Avallay (50')	
54	1969	Reclasif.	Newell's	(Draw)	2–2	Bezerra (30'), Ramírez (37')	Gramajo (15'), Castronovo (47')
55	1969	Reclasif.	R. Central	(Draw)	0–0		
56	1970 Met.	1	Newell's	(Draw)	1–1	Obberti (55')	Gramajo (27')
57	1970 Nac.	1	R. Central	R. Central	3–1	Poy (4', 34'), Gramajo (57')	Obberti (88')
58	1970 Nac.	2	Newell's	R. Central	4–1	Bustos (2', 27'), Gramajo (53', 79')	Martins (70')
59	1971 Met.	1	R. Central	(Draw)	2–2	Bóveda (10'), Poy (49')	Zanabria (24'), Fanesi (41' o.g.)
60	1971 Met.	2	Newell's	R. Central	2–1	Solórzano (57')	Pascuttini (30'), Colman (80')
61	1971 Nac.	1	Newell's	(Draw)	0–0		
62	1971 Nac.	Semif.	River Plate	R. Central	1–0	Poy (54')	
63	1972 Met	1	Newell's	Newell's	1–0	Mendoza (73')	
64	1972 Met	2	R. Central	(Draw)	0–0		
65	1972 Nac	1	Newell's	Newell's	1–0	Rocha (14')	
66	1973 Met	1	R. Central	R. Central	4–1	Jara (24' o.g.), Aricó (44'), Pascuttini (57'), Rodríguez (60')	D. Marangoni (63')
67	1973 Met	2	Newell's	R. Central	1–0		Aimar (11')
68	1973 Nac	1	Newell's	(Draw)	1–1	Cerqueiro (23')	Cabral (13')
69	1974 Met	1	Newell's	Newell's	4–2	Santamaría (17', 39'), Zanabria (25'), Berta (54')	Cabral (41'), Aimar (46')
70	1974 Met	2	R. Central	R. Central	3–0	Aimar (5'), Cabral (12') Bóveda (48')	
71	1974 Met	3	R. Central	(Draw)	2–2	Arias (45'), Aimar (69')	Capurro (71'), Zanabria (81')
72	1974 Nac	1	Newell's	(Draw)	0–0		
73	1974 Nac	2	R. Central	(Draw)	0–0		
74	1974 Nac	3	Newell's	(Draw)	2–2		
75	1974 Lig.	1	R. Central	R. Central	2–0	Kempes (28'), Cabral (80')	
76	1975 Met	2	Newell's	(Draw)	1–1	Valdano (34')	Carril (58')
77	1975 Met	2	R. Central	(Draw)	1–1	Pascuttini (62')	Robles (14')
78	1975 Nac	2	R. Central	R. Central	3–0	Kempes (4', 32', 66')	
79	1975 Nac	2	Newell's	(Draw)	1–1	Robles (69')	Kempes (84')
80	1976 Met	1	Newell's	(Draw)	1–1	Palacios (28')	Peña (47')
81	1976 Met	2	Atlanta	(Draw)	1–1	Romero (84')	Robles (74')
82	1976 Met	3	R. Central	(Draw)	0–0		
83	1976 Nac	1	R. Central	(Draw)	1–1	Pascuttini (53')	Irigoyen (28')
84	1976 Nac	2	Newell's	Newell's	2–0	Rocha (10'), Moyano (18')	
85	1977 Met	1	R. Central	(Draw)	1–1	Benito (69')	Robles (20')
86	1977 Met	2	Newell's	Newell's	2–1	Montes (13'), Sánchez (87')	Agüero (25')
87	1978 Met	1	R. Central	R. Central	3–1	Aimar (51'), Trama (60'), Coullery (85')	Robles (77')
88	1978 Met	2	Newell's	Newell's	3–1	Gallego (9'), Alfaro (33'), Sánchez (50')	Trama (31')
89	1979 Nac	1	R. Central	(Draw)	2–2	Orte (15'), Trama (43')	Ramos (30'), Petti (47')
90	1979 Nac	2	Newell's	R. Central	1–0		Bauza (27')
91	1980 Met	1	R. Central	Newell's	3–0		Alfaro (51'), Yazalde (52', 89')
92	1980 Met	2	Newell's	R. Central	1–0		García (47')
93	1980 Nac	1	Newell's	Newell's	1–0	Talavera (66')	
94	1980 Nac	2	R. Central	R. Central	2–1	Marchetti (10', 27')	Yazalde (16')
95	1980 Nac	Semif	R. Central	R. Central	3–0	Ghielmetti (33'), Gaitán (39'), Marchetti (71')	
96	1980 Nac	Semif	Newell's	Newell's	1–0	Santamaría (39')	
97	1981 Met	1	Newell's	Newell's	3–0	Killer (29'), Santamaría (21'), Bulleri (80')	
98	1981 Met	2	R. Central	(Draw)	0–0		
99	1981 Nac	1	R. Central	R. Central	3–1	Bauza (57', 59'), Iglesias (65')	Petti (7')
100	1981 Nac	2	Newell's	(Draw)	1–1	Santamaría (44')	Bauza (14')
101	1982 Nac	1	Newell's	Newell's	2–1	Santamaría (68', 77')	Chazarreta (36')
102	1982 Nac	2	R. Central	R. Central	2–1	Bauza (19', 87')	Santamaría (44')
103	1982 Met	1	Newell's	(Draw)	1–1	Ramos (31')	Bauza (68')
104	1982 Met	2	R. Central	(Draw)	1–1	González (36')	Santamaría (67')
105	1983 Nac	1	Newell's	(Draw)	0–0		
106	1983 Nac	2	R. Central	R. Central	2–0	Campagna (71'), SScalise (86')	
107	1983 Met	1	R. Central	R. Central	2–1	Scalise (6'), A. Killer (21')	Ramos (84')
108	1983 Met	2	Newell's	(Draw)	3–3	Ramos (42'), Ciraolo (79', 81')	Reinaldi (37'), González (55'), Scalise (57')
109	1984 Met	1	Newell's	Newell's	2–1	Santillán (12'), Dezotti (70')	González (80')
110	1984 Met	2	R. Central	(Draw)	0–0		
111	1986–87	1	R. Central	(Draw)	0–0		
112	1986–87	2	Newell's	(Draw)	0–0		
113	1987–88	1	R. Central	R. Central	1–0	Scalise (48')	
114	1987–88	2	Newell's	Newell's	–	Dezotti (22')	
115	1988–89	1	Newell's	– (Note: Suspended due to violence between supporters. Both clubs were deducted two points each.)	–		
116	1988–89	2	R. Central	R. Central	2–1	Cuffaro Russo (72'), Bauza (89')	J.J. Rossi (74')
117	1988–89	Liguilla	R. Central	(Draw)	1–1	Escudero (83')	Martino (46')
118	1988–89	Liguilla	R. Central	Newell's	5–3	Llop (9' o.g.), Pizzi (62'), Bauza (88')	Taffarel (33', 49'), Batistuta (52', 90'), Ramos (83')
119	1989–90	1	Newell's	(Draw)	2–2	Ariel Cozzoni (24', 64')	Uliambre (75'), Gasparini (80')
120	1989–90	2	R. Central	–	–		
121	1990–91	1	R. Central	Newell's	4–3	Bisconti (45', 79', 89')	Gamboa (16'), Zamora (39'), Ruffini (46'), Sáez (87')
122	1990–91	2	Newell's	Newell's	4–0	Pochettino (21'), Cozzoni (41', 85'), Garfagnoli (78')	
123	1991–92	1	R. Central	R. Central	1–0	Delgado (22')	
124	1991–92	2	Newell's	Newell's	1–0	Domizzi (10')	
125	1992–93	1	R. Central	R. Central	2–1	J.L. Rodríguez (67'), Galloni (73')	Lunari (30')
126	1992–93	2	Newell's	(Draw)	1–1	Berizzo (25')	J.L. Rodríguez (89')
127	1993–94	1	Newell's	(Draw)	1–1	Gabrich (15')	A. Rossi (10')
128	1993–94	2	R. Central	(Draw)	0–0		
129	1994–95	1	R. Central	(Draw)	0–0		
130	1994–95	2	Newell's	(Draw)	1–1	Biagini (22')	Scotto (87')
131	1995–96	1	R. Central	R. Central	2–0	Carbonari (27'), Palma (63')	
132	1995–96	2	Newell's	Newell's	2–0	Gabrich (29'), Marioni (54')	
133	1996–97	1	R. Central	(Draw)	1–1	Facciuto (20')	Gerk (9')
134	1996–97	2	Newell's	(Draw)	0–0		
135	1997–98	1	R. Central	R. Central	4–0	Da Silva (2'), Coudet (35'), Carracedo (45'), Carbonari (60')	
136	1997–98	2	Newell's	(Draw	0–0		
137	1998–99	1	R. Central	(Draw)	1–1	Rivarola (53')	Zamora (36')
138	1998–99	2	Newell's	Newell's	4–1	Crosa (8'), Real (21', 47'), Saldaña (53')	?
139	1999–00	1	Newell's	(Draw)	1–1	Real (65')	E. González (50')
140	1999–00	2	R. Central	(Draw)	1–1	Pizzi (38')	Fuentes (79')
141	2000–01	1	Newell's	(Draw)	0–0		
142	2000–01	2	R. Central	Newell's	2–1	Pierucci (19')	Pavlovich (18'), Saldaña (86')
143	2001–02	1	Newell's	(Draw)	1–1	Pavlovich (51')	Encina (5')
144	2001–02	2	R. Central	(Draw)	0–0		
145	2002–03	1	Newell's	R. Central	2–0	Figueroa (40'), Arriola (87')	
146	2002–03	2	R. Central	R. Central	3–0	Figueroa (39'), Messera (58'), Delgado (84')	
147	2003–04	1	Newell's	(Draw)	1–1	Patiño (52')	Talamonti (77')
148	2003–04	2	R. Central	(Draw)	0–0		
149	2004–05	1	R. Central	Newell's	1–0		Maidana (76')
150	2004–05	2	Newell's	(Draw)	0–0		
151	2005–06	1	Newell's	Newell's	2–1	Ortega (p. 54'), Garay (71')	Rivarola (45')
152	2005–06	2	R. Central	(Draw)	0–0		
153	2006–07	1	R. Central	R. Central	4–1	Coudet (18'), Wanchope (36'), Ruben (45'), Kily González (p. 79')	(48')
154	2006–07	2	Newell's	Newell's	1–0	Cardozo (68')	
155	2007–08	1	Newell's	R. Central	1–0		Arzuaga (p. 73')
156	2007–08	2	R. Central	Newell's	1–0		Salcedo (41')
157	2008–09	1	Newell's	Newell's	1–0	Schiavi (p. 21')	
158	2008–09	2	R. Central	(Draw)	1–1	Zelaya (80')	Formica (66')
159	2009–10	1	Newell's	(Draw)	2–2	Boghossian (15'), Achucarro (27')	Núñez (11'), Chitzoff (12')
160	2009–10	2	R. Central	(Draw)	1–1	Braghieri (2')	Schiavi (p. 15')
161	2013–14	1	R. Central	R. Central	2–1	Donatti (11'), Encina (29')	Rodríguez (15')
162	2013–14	2	Newell's	R. Central	1–0		Niell (47')
163	2014	1	R. Central	R. Central	2–0	Niell (29'), Domínguez (37')	
164	2015	1	Newell's	R. Central	1–0		Ruben (68')
165	2015	2	R. Central	(Draw)	0–0		
166	2016	1	R. Central	R. Central	2–0	Larrondo (56'), Ruben (90'+1')	
167	2016	2	Newell's	(Draw)	0–0		
168	2016–17	1	R. Central	Newell's	1–0		M. Rodríguez (90+3')
169	2016–17	2	Newell's	R. Central	3–1	Carrizo (10'), Ruben (31') Herrera (90'+1')	Formica (89')
170	2017–18	1	R. Central	R. Central	1–0	G. Herrera (2')	
171	2018–19	1	Newell's	(Draw)	0–0		
172	2019–20	1	Central	(Draw)	1–1	Riaño (68')	Lema (66')
173	2021	1	Newell's	(Draw)	1–1	N. Castro (60')	D. Martínez (53')
174	2022	1	R. Central	R. Central	1–0	Veliz (45'+1')	
175	2023	1	Newell's	(Draw)	0–0		
176	2024	1	R. Central	R. Central	1–0	F.Mallo (84')	
177	2025	1	Newell's	R. Central	2–1	Ever Banega	Duarte, Campaz
178	2025	1	R. Central	R. Central	1–0	A. Di María (82')	

=== National cups ===
#	Year	Cup	Round	Venue	Winner	Score	Goals (H)	Goals (A)
1	1909	Copa Honor MCBA	1	R. Central	Newell's	3–2	Hayes (35') Vázquez (75')	Manuel González (20', 60', 70')
2	1911	Copa Honor MCBA	1	R. Central	Newell's	2–1	Green	Viale (2)
3	1912	Copa Honor MCBA	1	R. Central	Newell's	5–3		
4	1916	Copa Honor MCBA	1	R. Central	R. Central	8–0	José Laiolo (3), Bianco (2), E. Hayes (2), Ramírez	
5	1918	Copa Jockey Club	1	Newell's	R. Central	3–1	Badalini (14')	H. Hayes (22', 67') Blanco (52')
6	1918	Copa Honor MCBA	1	Newell's	Newell's	3–0	Badalini (2), Fraccia	
7	1933	Copa Beccar Varela	1	Newell's	R. Central	1–0		García (1')
8	1946	Copa Británica	1	Newell's	R. Central	4–2	Ferreyra (52'), Runzer (53')	Marracino (57', 85'), Aguirre (80'), Pérez (89')
9	1969	Copa Argentina	1	R. Central	(Draw)	0–0		
10	1969	Copa Argentina	2	Newell's	R. Central	3–2	Bezerra (5'), Martinoli (37')	Griguol (8'), Gennoni (27'), Castronovo (85')
11	1970	Copa Argentina	1	R. Central	R. Central	1–0	Balbuena (22')	
12	1970	Copa Argentina	2	Newell's	(Draw)	0–0		
13	1993	Copa Centenario AFA	1	Newell's	Newell's	2–0	Garay (36'), Calcaterra (42')	
14	1993	Copa Centenario AFA	2	R. Central	Newell's	1–0		Castagno Suárez (70')
15	2018	Copa Argentina	1	Arsenal	R. Central	2–1	Herrera (63'), Zampedri (68')	Torres (90'+4')
16	2021	Copa LPF	1	R. Central	R. Central	3–0	Ruben (17'), Ferreyra (61'), Martínez Dupuy (80')	
17	2022	Copa LPF	1	R. Central	Newell's	1–0		García (50')
18	2023	Copa LPF	1	R. Central	R. Central	1–0	Malcorra (86')	
19	2024	Copa LPF	1	Newell's	R. Central	1–0		Malcorra (57')

== Statistics ==
=== Matches by association ===
AFA competitions
Competition	Period	Played	RC wins	Draws	NOB wins
Primera División	1939–pres.	179	57	77	43
Copa de Honor MCBA	1909–18	5	1	1	4
Copa Jockey Club	1918	1	1	0	0
Copa Beccar Varela	1933	1	1	0	0
Copa de Competencia Británica	1946–48	2	2	0	0
Copa Argentina	1969–pres.	5	3	2	0
Copa Centenario AFA	1993–94	2	0	0	2
Copa de la Liga Profesional	2021–pres.	4	3	0	1

CONMEBOL competitions
Competition	Period	Played	RC wins	Draws	NOB wins
Copa Libertadores	1975–pres.	3	1	2	0
Copa Sudamericana	2005	2	1	1	0

Rosarian competitions
Competition	Period	Played	RC wins	Draws	NOB wins
Copa Santiago Pinasco	1905–06	4	0	2	2
Copa Nicasio Vila	1907–30	43	19	9	15
Copa Damas de Caridad (LRF)	1910–16	2	1	0	1
Copa Estímulo (LRF)	1922–27	3	1	1	1
Trofeo Luciano Molinas	1931–38	17	3	6	8
Torneo Preparación	1934–36	4	3	1	0
Torneo Ivancich	1937-38	2	2	0	0

Santa Fe competitions
Competition	Period	Played	RC wins	Draws	NOB wins
Copa Prov. Santa Fe	2016–pres.	2	0	2	0

=== Total numbers ===
Assoc./Leagues	Period.	Matches	RC wins	Draws	NOB wins
Rosarian (Note: Includes tournaments organised by both, Liga Rosarina de Football and Asociación Rosarina de Football.)	1905–38	75	29	19	27
AFA (Note: National cups included. Moreover, the AFA deducted 2 points in two matches to both teams in 1989 due to supporters incidents.)	1939–pres.	199	68	79	50
CONMEBOL	1960–pres.	5	2	3	0
Total		281	99	103	77

=== Top scorers ===
Newell's
Player	Goals
Manuel González	30
Eduardo Gómez	16
José Viale	11
Santiago Santamaría	9

Rosario Central
Player	Goals
Harry Hayes	21
Ennis Hayes	9
Edgardo Bauza	9
Mario Kempes	7

Since the clubs joined the AFA league system in 1939 the top scorers are Edgardo Bauza (Central) and Santiago Santamaría (Newell's), with 9 each.

=== Most appearances ===
Newell's
Player	Match.
Santiago Santamaría	31
Mario Zanabria	31
Manuel González	27

Rosario Central
Player	Match.
Jorge José González	45
José Pascuttini	38
Harry Hayes	26

=== Biggest wins ===
Newell's
Period	Year	Result	Competit.
1905–38	1912	7-0 (A)	Copa Nicasio Vila
1939–	1941	5-0 (H)	Primera División

Rosario Central
Period	Year	Result	Competit.
1905–38	1917	9-0 (H)	Copa Nicasio Vila
1939–	1964	4-0 (A)	Primera División
1939–	1997	4-0 (H)	Primera División

=== Most consecutive wins ===
Newell's
Era	Home/Away	Period	Wins
1905–1938	General	1909–12	10
1905–1938	Home	1909–12	6
1905–1938	Away	1909–12	5
1939–present	General	1940–41	3
1939–present	Home	1945–48	4
1939–present	Away	1940–41	2

Rosario Central
Era	Home/Away	Period	Wins
1905–1938	General	1914–1918	11
1905–1938	Home	1914–1918	5
1905–1938	Away	1914–1918	6
1939–present	General	2023-present	6
1939–present	Home	2022-present	4
1939–present	Away	1950–1953, 2024-present	3

=== Unbeaten runs ===
Newell's
Era	Home/Away	Period	Match.
1905–1938	General	1929–1933	12
1905–1938	Home	1918–1933	18
1905–1938	Away	1929–1933	6
1939–present	General	1998–2002	9
1939–present	Home	1980–2001	27
1939–present	Away	1939–1944	5

Rosario Central
Era	Home/Away	Period	Match.
1905–1938	General	1914–1918	11
1905–1938	Home	1914–1925	9
1905–1938	Away	1914–1918	6
1939–present	General	1974–1976	17
1939–present	Home	1966–1980	20
1939–present	Away	1966–1971	10

== Titles ==
Competition	R. Central	Newell's
Primera División	5	6
National cups	7	3
Official international cups	1	0
Rosario region (Note: Include tournaments (leagues and cups) organised by Liga Rosarina, Federación Rosarina, Asoc. Amateurs and Asociación Rosarina (1907-1938))	22	16
Santa Fe region (Note: Include regional official cups of the Federación Santafesina de Fútbol: Copa Santa Fe (2016-present))	1	0
Total	36	25

== Newell's Old Boys highlights ==
- June 18, 1905: Won 1–0 in the first Rosario derby of all history.
- August 8, 1909: Won 3–2 to record their 10th straight win over Rosario Central.
- July 28, 1912: Won 0–7 to record the biggest ever away win in the Rosario derby.
- October 20, 1912: Manuel Lito González scored all 5 goals in a 5–3 win.
- October 12, 1941: Won 5–0 to record the biggest win in the Rosario derby since the start of the professional era of Argentine football.
- June 2, 1974: Newell's won their first ever title by coming from 2-0 down at half time to record the draw they needed to win the Metropolitano 1974.

== Rosario Central highlights ==
- August 2, 1908: Won 9–3 in the highest scoring derby, with 5 goals from Corti.
- May 25, 1914: Harry Hayes scored a hat-trick to help Rosario Central win 6–2, starting a run of 11 consecutive wins.
- October 17, 1915: Won 0–6 to record their best ever away win in the fixture.
- June 29, 1916: Won 8–0 in a qualifier for the 1916 Copa de Honor. Then, finally Central of won that national official cup.
- 1917: Won 9–0 to record the biggest ever win in the official's derby fixture.
- December 19, 1971: Won 1–0 in the semi-final of the Nacional championship. Then, finally Central was the Argentine Champion.
- April 11, 1975: Won 1–0 in a Copa Libertadores playoff to eliminate Newell's and progress to the 2nd round.
- 1980: Won 3:1 in the aggregate in the semi-final of the National Championship. It was 3:0 at home and 0:1 at Newell's stadium. Then, as in 1971, Rosario Central won the final, and was the Argentina's champion again.
- August 29, 2005: Won 1–0 in the second leg of a Copa Sudamericana preliminary round, to progress 1–0 on aggregate.
- November 1, 2018: Won 1–2 in the 2017–18 Copa Argentina in quarter finals. Then, Rosario Central won the final, and was the champion of the tournament.
