= Eduardo Bacas =

Argentine footballer and manager

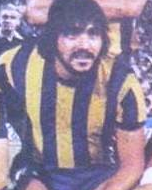

Eduardo Antonio Bacas Rojas (born December 20, 1953, in Tucumán, Argentina) is an Argentine football manager and former player who played as a midfielder. He was also part of Argentina's squad for the 1979 Copa América tournament.

== Career ==
He began his football career at Tucumán Central, a club in the Liga Tucumana de Fútbol. His outstanding performances attracted the attention of other clubs in the region, such as Altos Hornos Zapla and Atlético Ledesma, both from Jujuy Province, who signed him to play in the Campeonato Nacional tournaments.

At Atlético Ledesma he played under coach Ángel Tulio Zof, who in 1979 took him to Rosario Central together with teammate Héctor Chazarreta. At the club he enjoyed an outstanding spell thanks to his style of play, becoming part of the team nicknamed La Sinfónica, which reached the semifinals of both the 1979 Argentine Primera División Metropolitano and the 1979 Campeonato Nacional. The failure to win either tournament led to Zof’s departure; however, he was rehired in mid-1980. He then led the team that won the 1980 Campeonato Nacional, with Bacas as an undisputed starter. After playing the 1981 Copa Libertadores with the club from Barrio Arroyito, Bacas was transferred to Club América in Mexico.

With the Águilas he continued his good performances, becoming one of the most important players in the squad and decisive in winning championships. With the azulcrema side he won three league titles.

== Honours ==
Rosario Central

- Argentine Primera División: 1980 Nacional

América

- Liga MX: 1983-84, 1984-85, 1985-Prode
