= 1980 Argentine Primera División =

89th season of top-tier football league in Argentina

Primera División
- Season: 1980
- Champions: River Plate (Metropolitano); Rosario Central (Nacional)

The 1980 Primera División season was the 89th season of top-flight football in Argentina. River Plate won the Metropolitano (20th title) while Rosario Central (3rd title) won the Nacional championship.

All Boys, Quilmes and Tigre were relegated.

== Metropolitano Championship ==
Metropolitano
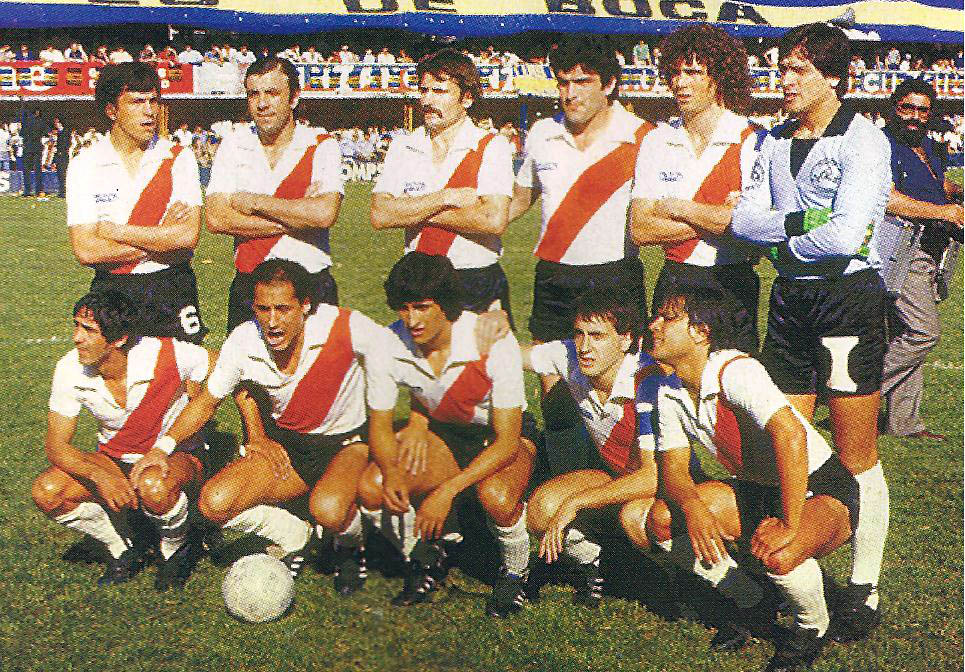
- River Plate, Metropolitano champions
- Season: 1980
- Champions: River Plate (20th title)
- Promoted: Talleres (C); Tigre
- Relegated: All Boys; Quilmes; Tigre
- 1981 Copa Libertadores: River Plate
- Top goalscorer: (Argentina) Diego Maradona (25 goals)

Pos	Team	Pld	W	D	L	GF	GA	GD	Pts
1	River Plate	36	20	11	5	64	33	+31	51
2	Argentinos Juniors	36	13	16	7	57	48	+9	42
3	Talleres (C)	36	12	17	7	58	43	+15	41
3	Platense	36	12	17	7	36	30	+6	41
5	Unión	36	16	7	13	49	44	+5	39
6	Newell's Old Boys	36	12	14	10	54	35	+19	38
6	Boca Juniors	36	12	14	10	43	47	−4	38
8	Huracán	36	11	15	10	58	50	+8	37
8	Rosario Central	36	11	15	10	43	41	+2	37
10	Racing	36	9	18	9	35	34	+1	36
10	Colón	36	13	10	13	41	49	−8	36
10	Estudiantes (LP)	36	10	16	10	34	43	−9	36
13	Ferro Carril Oeste	36	11	13	12	55	50	+5	35
13	Independiente	36	11	13	12	45	49	−4	35
13	Vélez Sársfield	36	11	13	12	35	42	−7	35
16	San Lorenzo	36	9	15	12	39	43	−4	33
17	Quilmes	36	6	18	12	37	44	−7	30
18	All Boys	36	3	17	16	29	56	−27	23
19	Tigre	36	5	11	20	38	69	−31	21

== Nacional Championship ==
Nacional
- Season: 1980
- Champions: Rosario Central (3rd title)
- 1981 Copa Libertadores: Rosario Central
- Top goalscorer: (Argentina) Diego Maradona (18 goals)

=== Group A ===
Pos	Team	Pld	W	D	L	GF	GA	GD	Pts
1	Rosario Central	14	7	3	4	24	13	+11	17
1	Racing (C)	14	8	1	5	20	15	+5	17
3	Estudiantes (LP)	14	6	4	4	27	17	+10	16
4	Vélez Sársfield	14	5	4	5	23	21	+2	14
5	Gimnasia y Esgrima (J)	14	4	6	4	20	24	−4	14
6	Racing	14	4	3	7	24	31	−7	11
7	Atlético Tucumán	14	3	3	8	15	30	−15	9

=== Group B ===
Pos	Team	Pld	W	D	L	GF	GA	GD	Pts
1	Argentinos Juniors	14	9	2	3	35	21	+14	20
2	Unión	14	8	1	5	19	17	+2	17
3	Talleres (C)	14	6	4	4	24	12	+12	16
4	Huracán	14	6	2	6	26	25	+1	14
5	Boca Juniors	14	4	4	6	17	22	−5	12
6	San Martín (M)	14	3	6	5	14	27	−13	12
7	San Lorenzo	14	4	0	10	18	26	−8	8

=== Group C ===
Pos	Team	Pld	W	D	L	GF	GA	GD	Pts
1	Newell's Old Boys	14	8	4	2	21	12	+9	20
2	Independiente	14	8	3	3	26	11	+15	19
3	Ferro Carril Oeste	14	6	5	3	18	10	+8	17
4	Atlético Uruguay	14	6	2	6	15	18	−3	14
5	Quilmes	14	5	1	8	15	17	−2	11
6	Central Norte	14	3	4	7	11	25	−14	10
7	Chaco For Ever	14	3	1	10	15	30	−15	7

=== Group D ===
Pos	Team	Pld	W	D	L	GF	GA	GD	Pts
1	Instituto	14	6	6	2	22	15	+7	18
2	River Plate	14	8	1	5	30	16	+14	17
2	Platense	14	7	3	4	25	14	+11	17
4	San Lorenzo	14	6	2	6	17	17	0	14
4	Colón	14	6	2	6	15	20	−5	14
6	Cipolletti	14	4	4	6	14	21	−7	12
7	Independiente Rivadavia	14	0	5	9	8	31	−23	5

=== Quarterfinals ===
Team 1	Agg.	Team 2	1st leg	2nd leg
River Plate	5–8	Newell's Old Boys	3–2	2–6
Instituto	3–6	Independiente	2–1	1–5
Argentinos Juniors	2–4	Racing (C)	1–1	1–3
Rosario Central	3–2	Unión	2–0	1–2

=== Semifinals ===
Team 1	Agg.	Team 2	1st leg	2nd leg
Rosario Central	3–1	Newell's Old Boys	3–0	0–1
Racing (C)	7–5	Independiente	4–0	3–5

=== Finals ===
Team 1	Agg.	Team 2	1st leg	2nd leg
Rosario Central	5–3	Racing (C)	5–1	0–2

Rosario Central won the championship 5–3 on aggregate.

==== First leg ====
1980 Campeonato Nacional Final
17 December 1980
First leg

Rosario Central	5–1	Racing (C)
Bauza 7'; Palma 43'; Marchetti 64'; Agonil 72'; Trama 76'	Report	Oyola 54'

Gigante de Arroyito, Rosario

==== Second leg ====
21 December 1980
Second leg

Racing (C)	2–0	Rosario Central
Oyola 7'; Gasparini 82'	Report

Chateau Carreras, Córdoba
Referee: Teodoro Nitti

Racing (C)	Rosario Central

GK	1	(Argentina) Juan Ramos
DF	4	(Argentina) Lucio Del Mul
DF	2	(Argentina) Pascual Noriega
DF	6	(Argentina) Héctor Maldonado	Substituted off
DF	3	(Argentina) Enrique Vivanco
MF	8	(Argentina) Oscar A. López
MF	5	(Argentina) Guillermo Aramayo
MF	10	(Argentina) Roberto Gasparaini
FW	7	(Argentina) Luis Amuchástegui
FW	9	(Argentina) Miguel Ballejo	Substituted off
FW	11	(Argentina) Atilio Oyola
Substitutes:
FW		(Argentina) Horacio Baldessari	Substituted on
MF		(Argentina) Rubén Molina	Substituted on
Manager:
(Argentina) Alfio Basile

GK	1	(Argentina) Daniel Carnevali
DF	4	(Argentina) Juan C. Ghielmetti
DF	2	(Argentina) Oscar Crayacich
DF	6	(Argentina) Edgardo Bauza
DF	3	(Argentina) Jorge A. García
MF	8	(Argentina) José Luis Gaitán
MF	5	(Argentina) Omar Palma
MF	10	(Argentina) Eduardo Bacas	Substituted off
FW	7	(Argentina) Félix Orte
FW	9	(Argentina) Víctor Marchetti
FW	11	(Argentina) Daniel Teglia	Substituted off
Substitutes:
FW		(Argentina) Guillermo Trama	Substituted on
DF		(Argentina) Aldo Espinoza	Substituted on
Manager:
(Argentina) Ángel Tulio Zof
