= 1986–87 in Argentine football =

Football in Argentina
- Season: 1986–87

Following are the results of the 1986–87 season in Argentine football.

The competition saw Rosario Central win the Argentine Primera by a single point from fierce local rivals Newell's Old Boys. River Plate won the Copa Libertadores 1986 and followed it up with the Copa Intercontinental.

| Position | Team | Points | Played | Won | Drawn | Lost | For | Against | Difference |
|---|---|---|---|---|---|---|---|---|---|
| 1 | Rosario Central | 49 | 38 | 17 | 15 | 6 | 64 | 45 | 19 |
| 2 | Newell's Old Boys | 48 | 38 | 19 | 10 | 9 | 57 | 38 | 19 |
| 3 | Independiente | 47 | 38 | 17 | 13 | 8 | 70 | 47 | 23 |
| 4 | Boca Juniors | 46 | 38 | 18 | 10 | 10 | 62 | 49 | 13 |
| 5 | Racing Club | 44 | 38 | 16 | 12 | 10 | 50 | 41 | 9 |
| 6 | Ferro Carril Oeste | 44 | 38 | 13 | 18 | 7 | 40 | 32 | 8 |
| 7 | San Lorenzo | 44 | 38 | 15 | 14 | 9 | 45 | 38 | 7 |
| 8 | Instituto de Córdoba | 41 | 38 | 13 | 15 | 10 | 54 | 46 | 8 |
| 9 | Vélez Sársfield | 41 | 38 | 15 | 11 | 12 | 50 | 43 | 7 |
| 10 | River Plate | 39 | 38 | 13 | 13 | 12 | 54 | 49 | 5 |
| 11 | Talleres de Córdoba | 38 | 38 | 11 | 16 | 11 | 45 | 61 | -16 |
| 12 | Estudiantes de La Plata | 37 | 38 | 10 | 17 | 11 | 40 | 45 | -5 |
| 13 | Gimnasia de La Plata | 37 | 38 | 12 | 13 | 13 | 33 | 41 | -8 |
| 14 | Deportivo Español | 36 | 38 | 12 | 12 | 14 | 29 | 31 | -2 |
| 15 | Racing de Córdoba | 33 | 38 | 8 | 17 | 13 | 43 | 56 | -13 |
| 16 | Unión de Santa Fe | 31 | 38 | 6 | 19 | 13 | 30 | 38 | -8 |
| 17 | Argentinos Juniors | 28 | 38 | 5 | 18 | 15 | 45 | 47 | -2 |
| 18 | Temperley | 27 | 38 | 7 | 13 | 18 | 28 | 48 | -20 |
| 19 | Platense | 27 | 38 | 6 | 15 | 17 | 40 | 63 | -23 |
| 20 | Deportivo Italiano | 23 | 38 | 6 | 11 | 21 | 29 | 59 | -30 |

- Rosario Central qualified for Copa Libertadores 1987 as champions of Argentina.
- Teams highlighted in light blue qualified for the Liguilla Pre-Libertadores.

== Top scorers ==
| Position | Player | Team | Goals |
|---|---|---|---|
| 1 | Omar Palma | Rosario Central | 20 |
| 2 | Jorge Comas | Boca Juniors | 19 |
| 3 | Franco Navarro | Independiente | 18 |

== Relegation ==
- Deportivo Italiano were relegated with the worst points average (0.600)
- Temperley were relegated after losing 2–0 to Platense in the relegation playoff.

== Liguilla Pre-Libertadores ==
- Deportivo Armenio, Banfield and Belgrano de Córdoba qualified as the top 3 teams in the 2nd division.

Quarter finals

| Home (1st leg) | Home (2nd leg) | 1st Leg | 2nd leg | Aggregate |
|---|---|---|---|---|
| Banfield | Independiente | 1-0 | 0-2 | 1-2 |
| Belgrano | Newell's Old Boys | 0-0 | 0-2 | 0-2 |
| Deportivo Armenio | Boca Juniors | 2-4 | 0-2 | 2-6 |
| Racing Club | Ferro Carril Oeste | 0-0 | 1-2 | 1-2 |

Semi-finals

| Home (1st leg) | Home (2nd leg) | 1st Leg | 2nd leg | Aggregate |
|---|---|---|---|---|
| Ferro Carril Oeste | Independiente | 0-1 | 0-0 | 0-1 |
| Newell's Old Boys | Boca Juniors | 0-1 | 2-5 | 2-6 |

Final

| Home (1st leg) | Home (2nd leg) | 1st Leg | 2nd leg | Aggregate |
|---|---|---|---|---|
| Independiente | Boca Juniors | 2-2 | 2-1 | 4-3 |

- Independiente qualified for Copa Libertadores 1987.

== Argentine clubs in international competitions ==
| Team | Copa Libertadores 1986 | Copa Intercontinental 1986 |
|---|---|---|
| River Plate | Champions | Champions |
| Argentinos Juniors | SF | N/A |
| Boca Juniors | Round 1 | N/A |
