= Marchetta =

Marchetta is an Italian surname. Notable people with the surname include:

- Camille Marchetta (born 1940), American novelist, television writer, and producer
- Melina Marchetta (born 1965), Australian writer and teacher
- Pedro Marchetta (1942-2022) Argentine footballer and football coach
