= Waldino Aguirre =

Argentine footballer

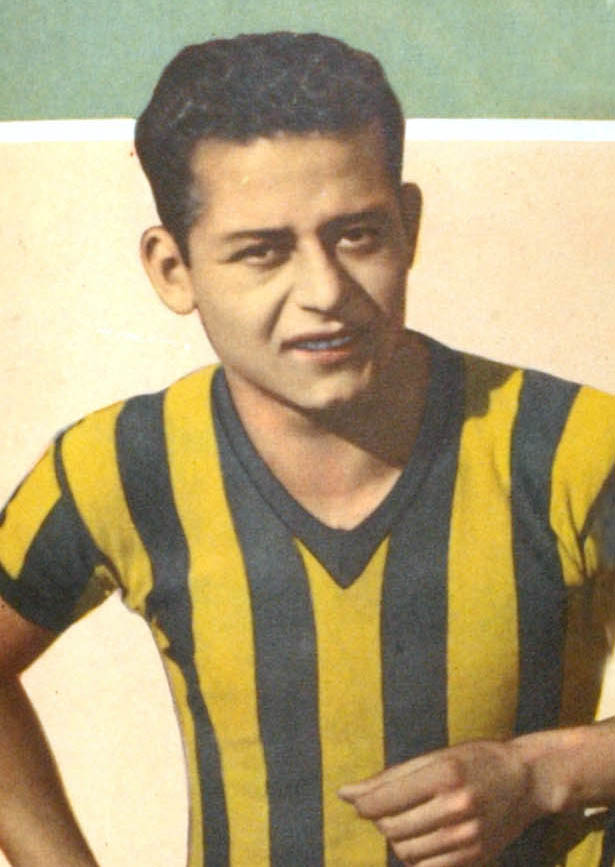
- Aguirre with Central in 1943

Personal information
- Date of birth: 18 November 1920
- Place of birth: Rosario, Santa Fe, Argentina
- Date of death: 28 October 1977 (aged 56)
- Place of death: Rosario, Santa Fe, Argentina
- Position: Forward

Senior career*
Years	Team	Apps	(Gls)
1937–1940	Central Córdoba de Rosario	?	(?)
1941–1946	Rosario Central	149	(87)
1947	Racing Club de Avellaneda	17	(6)
1948–1949	Huracán	18	(8)
1949–1951	Rosario Central	42	(9)
1951	Mariscal Sucre	?	(?)
- * Club domestic league appearances and goals

Waldino Aguirre, nicknamed Torito -the Little bull- (Rosario, 18 November 1920 – 28 October 1977) was an Argentine footballer who played for Rosario Central, Racing and Huracán. He was notable for being a skillful and brave player, which added a great mischief, which led him to win the heart of Rosario Central supporters, club of which is one of his greatest idols.

== Career ==
He was born in Tablada neighborhood, in the city of Rosario. From humble beginnings, he spent a lot of time in the fields since he was a child, first at the Club La Aurora and later at Central Córdoba. He played as inside-left forward; When Vicente de la Mata was traded to Independiente, Aguirre started to play in the Central Córdoba senior team, which contested tournaments organised by "Asociación Rosarina de Fútbol". In 1939 he won the Torneo del Litoral, which was played in response to the incorporation of Rosario Central and Newell's Old Boys to the Primera División, the top league of Argentina; Aguirre played the last minutes v Unión de Santa Fe (2–1 win).

His good performances called the attention of Rosario Central, which hired him. He made a successful debut against Club Atlético Platense on 6 April 1941, scoring the winning goal for Central. In that first season Aguirre scored a total of 10 goals; Despite his goal accuracy, Rosario Central was relegated to Primera B Metropolitana, the second division by then.

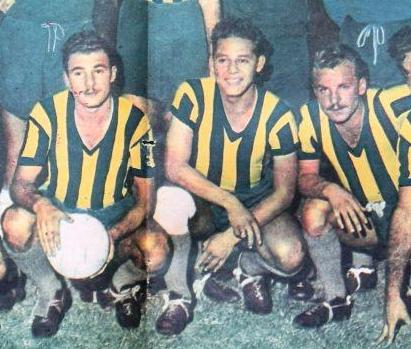
Aguirre (center) with Rubén Bravo and Ernesto Vidal, forwards of Rosario Central in 1941

In 1942 he was top scorer of the Second Division with 32 goals in 27 games, helping the team return to Primera with Rosario Central winning the title. Aguirre shared duties with other notable players such as Rubén Bravo, Bernardo Vilariño, Ernesto Vidal, and Ángel De Cicco. This offensive line was prolific in goals, as the Canallas scored 118 goals in all 32 games they played. Aguirre made six goals against Nueva Chicago (12–1) and Sportivo Dock Sud (9–0) in the same game, and four versus Almagro (6–3).

In the return of Central to the top division, Aguirre scored 7 goals in the 1943 season. The following year he played 12 matches and scored 3 goals, until he broke his leg, a serious injure that put him out of the fields for the rest of the season.

Aguirre returned during the 1945 season, scoring 21 goals in 29 games, fighting hand-to-hand with Ángel Labruna, who was finally the top scorer of the season with 25 goals. He also scored his first goal in the Rosario derby; it was on April 29, with Central winning 2–0 at Gigante de Arroyito. In the 1946 season, Aguirre was a key player for Central, along with other strikers that had shown up like Federico Federico Geronis and Benjamín Santos.

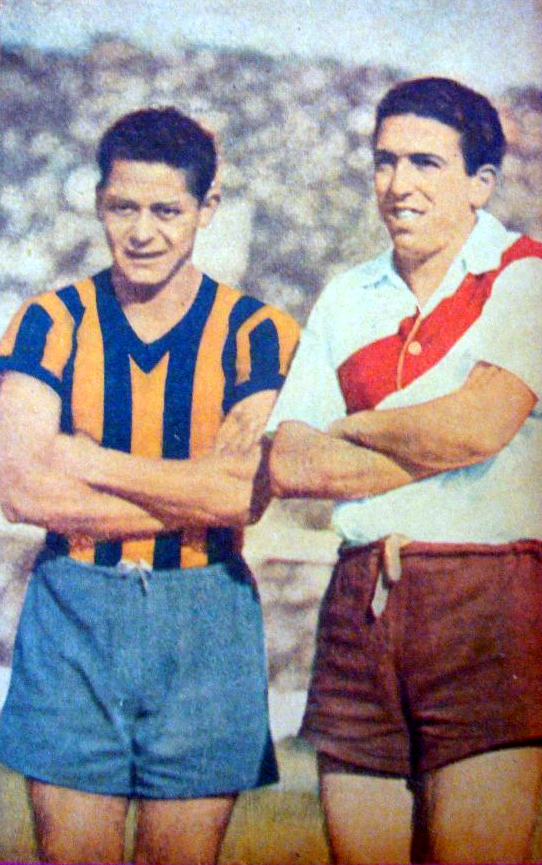
Aguirre with River Plate star Ángel Labruna (1946)

In 1947 Aguirre was sold to Racing Club for m$n 80,000; Thus Racing added to their own squad a player that had scored many goals against them. Despite the great expectations, Aguirre only scored 6 goals during his tenure in Racing. Thus, in 1948 he was transferred to Club Atlético Huracán, as part of a trade that included other four players being transferred to the club. In Huracán, Aguirre scored 8 goals in 18 games, a low mark considering his numbers with Rosario Central.

In the half of 1949, Aguirre returned to Rosario Central. During this year there was one of the most remembered moments in his career. In a derby against Newell's Old Boys, his team was losing and the Torito received insults from its rival's supporters; nevertheless, Central force a tie after a great play of Aguirre, with a goal celebration that included going to the women's grandstand, pulling down his pants and taking his testicles. He would be arrested for such misconduct. He scored a total of 3 goals in the championship.

Already in the decline of his career, he remained in the team when Rosario Central was relegated in 1950, contributing with 1 goal in 5 games to the return to the first division one year later. During that year he had a brief tenure on Mariscal Sucre of Peru, a club that introduced a team entirely formed by foreign players to attract fans, but the results were not as expected.

Aguirre's character and personality (including some provocations to rivals) made him to be one of the most beloved players by Rosario Central's fans. His personal duels with Newell's player Ángel Perucca were also regarded by the supporters. Due to his style of play and high goal accuracy, Aguirre was admired and idolised by a young Ernesto Guevara and writer Osvaldo Bayer. He was the referent of the club during the decade of 1940 next to the great captain Alfredo Fógel.

Aguirre remains as one of the all-time top scorers for Rosario Central, with a total of 98 goals, 61 in the first division, 33 in the second category and four in national cups.

== Last years and murder ==
After his retirement from professional football, Aguirre had problems with alcoholism and lived for many years as a beggar.

He lived in a humble house in the Tablada neighborhood, when on 27 October 1977, he was arrested by police officers accused of being involved in the abduction of a woman; Apparently Aguirre had only officiated as a guide to a newly released ex-convict who sought to settle accounts with the father of the aforementioned. Even the woman, once normalized her situation, declared that he had not participated of the kidnapping.

During his time in prison, Aguirre was savagely beaten by two officers in the courtyard of the police station, being tortured several times. He died in the early hours of 28 October 1977. The police doctor, Frank Michel Poenitz, signed the death certificate, citing death due to "cardiac arrest", but the subsequent judicial investigation found that the Torito had died due to an outbreak of his liver, as a result of the beating suffered. Forensic doctor Oscar Sánchez stated that Aguirre had several and big bruises on the abdomen, also revealing that he had seven ribs broken. The report also said that Aguirre had marks of boots on his chest. Two inmates testified as witnesses of Aguirre's martyrdom in the police station.

Three years after the murder, criminal judge Ramón Teodoro Ríos sentenced police officers Ovidio Miguel Acevedo and Maximiliano Cándido Basualdo to 13 and 12 years' imprisonment respectively for death and torments to the victim and falsification of documents. Poenitz was also found guilty of complicity in Aguirre's death, and sentenced to 6 months in jail.

With his death, Waldino Aguirre became the only football player to be murdered by security forces during the National Reorganization Process, the dictatorship that governed Argentina from 1976 to 1983.

== Titles ==
=== Club ===
Rosario Central

- Primera B (2): 1942, 1951

Central Córdoba (R)

- Torneo del Litoral (1): 1939

=== Individual ===
- Primera B topscorer: 1942
