= Edgardo Bauza =

Argentine footballer (born 1958)

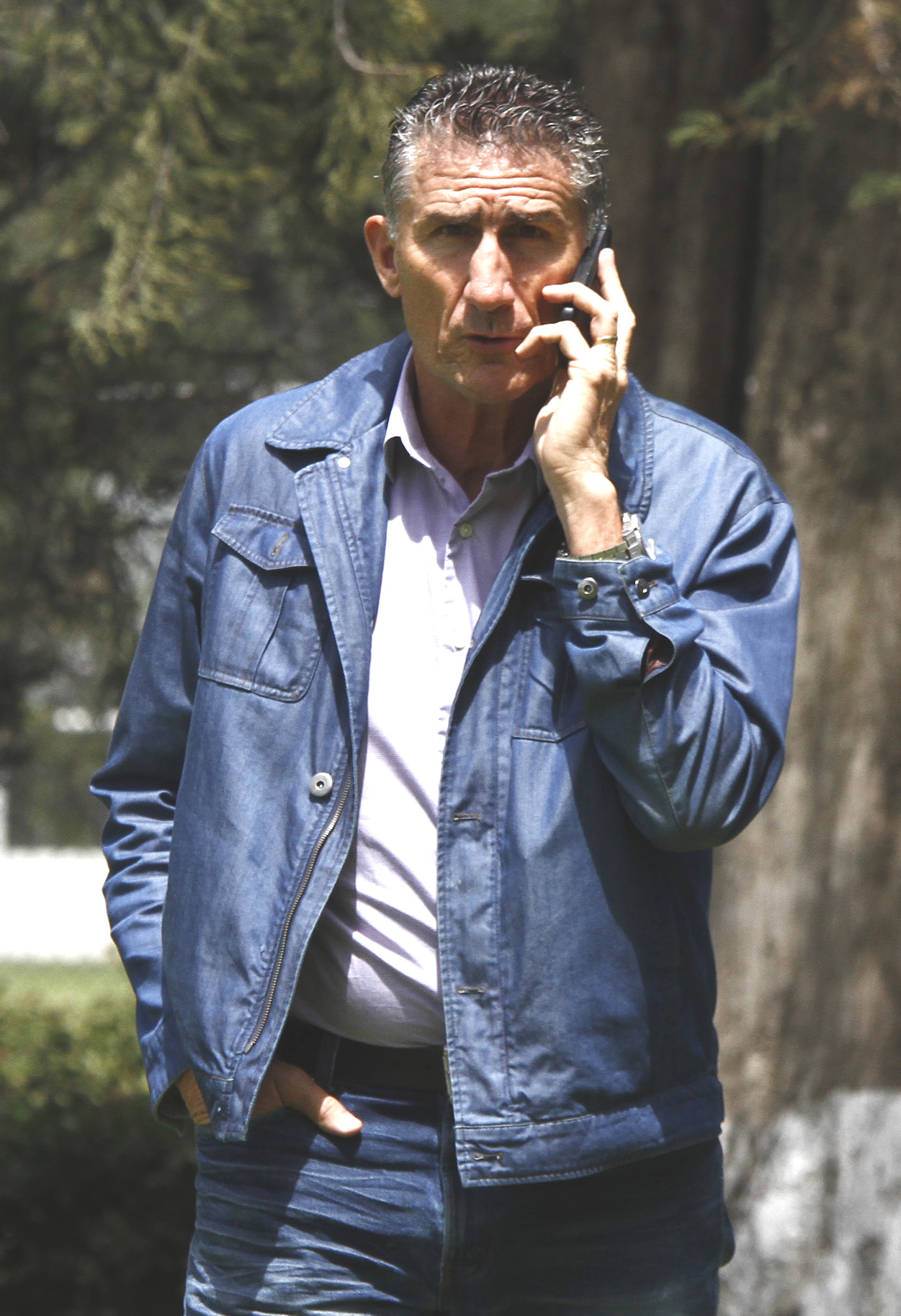
- Bauza in 2015

Personal information
- Full name: Edgardo Bauza
- Date of birth: 26 January 1958 (age 68)
- Place of birth: Granadero Baigorria, Argentina
- Height: 1.89 m (6 ft 2 in)
- Position: Defender

Senior career*
Years	Team	Apps	(Gls)
1977–1982	Rosario Central	310	(80)
1983–1985	Atlético Junior	87	(15)
1985–1986	Independiente	7	(1)
1986–1989	Rosario Central	130	(22)
1990–1991	Veracruz	31	(3)
Total		565	(121)

International career
1981–1990	Argentina	3	(0)

Managerial career
- 1999–2001: Rosario Central
- 2001–2002: Vélez Sársfield
- 2002–2003: Colón
- 2004–2005: Sporting Cristal
- 2005–2006: Colón
- 2006–2008: LDU Quito
- 2009: Al-Nassr
- 2010–2013: LDU Quito
- 2014–2015: San Lorenzo
- 2016: São Paulo
- 2016–2017: Argentina
- 2017: United Arab Emirates
- 2017: Saudi Arabia
- 2018–2019: Rosario Central
Medal record
Men's football
Representing Argentina
FIFA World Cup
Runner-up	1990 Italy
- * Club domestic league appearances and goals

Edgardo Bauza (born 26 January 1958) is an Argentine football manager and former player who played as a defender. Before taking up management, he played over 300 games for Rosario Central. He also played for Independiente in Argentina, Atlético Junior in Colombia and Veracruz in Mexico.

As a manager, Bauza has coached several South American sides, mainly in Argentina, but also teams in Peru, Ecuador, and Brazil, as well as Saudi club Al-Nassr, and the Argentina, United Arab Emirates, and Saudi Arabia national teams.

== Managerial career ==
In 2008, Bauza made history by becoming the first manager ever to lead an Ecuadorian club to victory in an international tournament, winning that year's Copa Libertadores. His team included three Argentine players (Damián Manso, Claudio Bieler and Norberto Araujo), along with Paraguayan midfielder Enrique Vera, strong wingers Luis Bolaños and Joffre Guerrón and veteran goalkeeper and penalty shootout hero José Francisco Cevallos. He resigned after losing the 2008 FIFA Club World Cup to Manchester United.

On 15 January 2009, the IFFHS ranked him third among the top ten club coaches around the world, only behind Sir Alex Ferguson and Dick Advocaat. He was also voted the 2008 South American Coach of the Year by Uruguayan newspaper El País. After a spell with Saudi Arabian side Al-Nassr FC, Bauza returned to LDU Quito in December 2009, replacing 2009 Copa Sudamericana-winning manager Jorge Fossati. He lost the 2011 Copa Sudamericana finals to Universidad de Chile.

In 2013, he joined San Lorenzo de Almagro of the Argentine Primera División, where he led the club to its first ever Copa Libertadores title in 2014. He subsequently signed with São Paulo FC from Brazil on 17 December 2015. President of club, Carlos Augusto de Barros e Silva, said the following words: "I am very happy for signing with a winning coach [...]".

After just one season in Brazil, Bauza was appointed as the new manager of the Argentina national team, on 11 August 2016. He was relieved of his duties on 11 April 2017 with the Albiceleste placed fifth in CONMEBOL World Cup qualifying, with only four teams guaranteed a qualification spot.

He was appointed as the head coach of United Arab Emirates national football team in May the same year, but narrowly failed to take the team to qualify for the World Cup, with a record of two wins, one draw and one defeat in his tenure. After only four months he resigned from the post to join Saudi Arabia in September. He was sacked from the Saudi Arabian team on 22 November.

He was appointed manager of Rosario Central in May 2018. Bauza guided Rosario Central to win the Copa Argentina 2018. After a period with bad results, Rosario decided to fire Bauza on 23 February 2019.

== Personal life ==
On 19 May 2022, it was revealed via Argentine radio that Bauza was suffering from advanced Alzheimer's disease.

== Honours ==
=== As a player ===
Rosario Central

- Primera División: 1980, 1986-87

Atlético Junior

- Categoría Primera A runner-up: 1983

Argentina

- FIFA World Cup runner-up: 1990

=== As a manager ===
Rosario Central

- Argentine Primera División runner-up: 1999 Apertura
- Copa CONMEBOL runner-up: 1998
- Copa Argentina: 2018

Sporting Cristal

- Peruvian Primera División runner-up: 2004

L.D.U. Quito

- Ecuadorian Serie A: 2007, 2010
- Copa Libertadores: 2008
- FIFA Club World Cup runner-up: 2008
- Recopa Sudamericana: 2010
- Suruga Bank Championship runner-up: 2010
- Copa Sudamericana runner-up: 2011

San Lorenzo

- Copa Campeonato runner-up: 2014
- Copa Libertadores: 2014
- FIFA Club World Cup runner-up: 2014,
- Recopa Sudamericana runner-up: 2015
- Argentine Primera División runner-up: 2015
