= 1986–87 Argentine Primera División =

96th season of top-tier football league in Argentina

Primera División
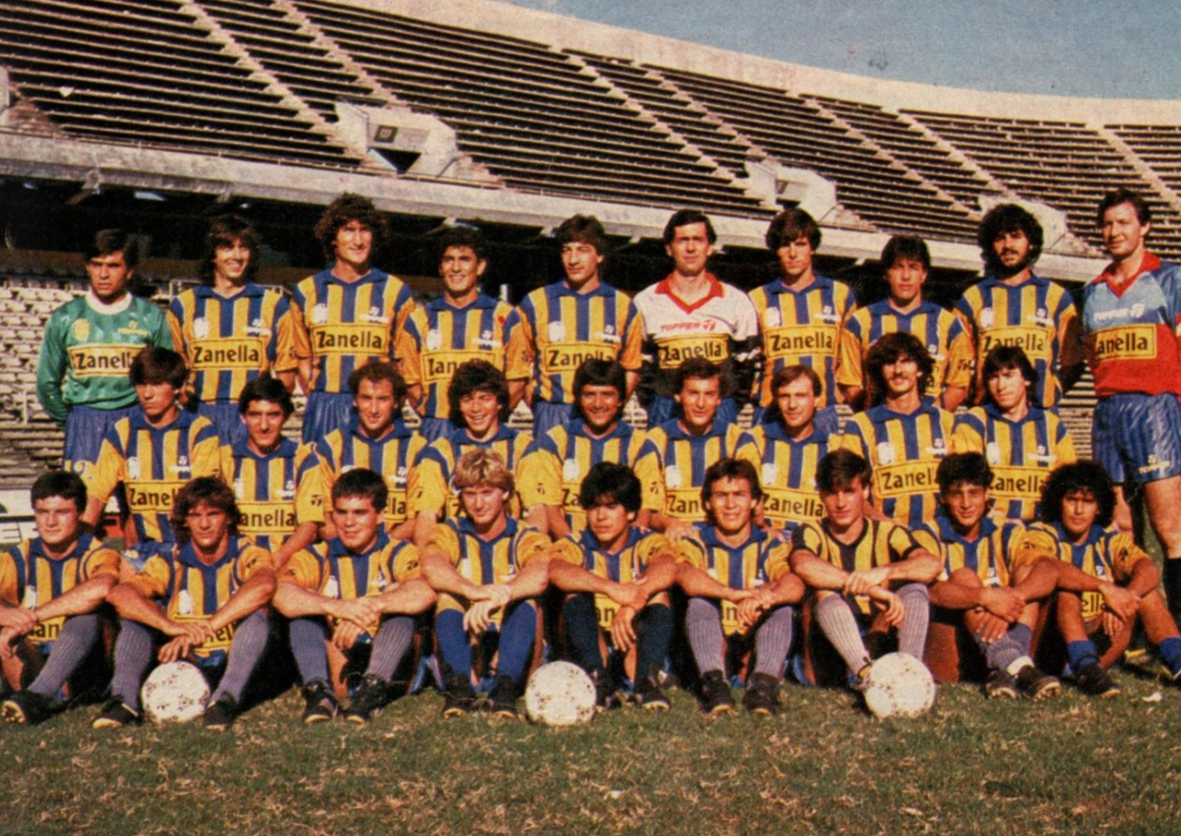
- Rosario Central, champions
- Season: 1986–87
- Champions: Rosario Central (4th title)
- Promoted: Sportivo Italiano; Racing; Rosario Central
- Relegated: Sportivo Italiano; Temperley
- 1987 Copa Libertadores: Rosario Central; Independiente
- Top goalscorer: (Argentina) Omar Palma (20 goals)

The 1986–87 Argentine Primera División was the 96th season of top-flight football in Argentina. The season began on July 13, 1986, and ended on May 2, 1987. Rosario Central won its 4th league´s title.

== League standings ==
Pos	Team	Pld	W	D	L	GF	GA	GD	Pts	Qualification
1	Rosario Central (C)	38	17	15	6	64	45	+19	49	Qualified for 1987 Copa Libertadores
2	Newell's Old Boys	38	19	10	9	57	38	+19	48	
3	Independiente	38	17	13	8	70	47	+23	47	
4	Boca Juniors	38	18	10	10	62	49	+13	46	
5	Racing	38	16	12	10	50	41	+9	44	
6	Ferro Carril Oeste	38	13	18	7	40	32	+8	44	
7	San Lorenzo	38	15	14	9	45	38	+7	44	
8	Instituto	38	13	15	10	54	46	+8	41	
9	Vélez Sársfield	38	15	11	12	50	43	+7	41	
10	River Plate	38	13	13	12	54	49	+5	39	
11	Talleres (C)	38	11	16	11	45	61	−16	38	
12	Estudiantes (LP)	38	10	17	11	40	45	−5	37	
13	Gimnasia y Esgrima (LP)	38	12	13	13	33	41	−8	37	
14	Deportivo Español	38	12	12	14	29	31	−2	36	
15	Racing (C)	38	8	17	13	43	56	−13	33	
16	Unión	38	6	19	13	30	38	−8	31	
17	Argentinos Juniors	38	5	18	15	45	47	−2	28	
18	Temperley	38	7	13	18	28	48	−20	27	
19	Platense	38	6	15	17	40	63	−23	27	
20	Sportivo Italiano	38	6	11	21	29	59	−30	23	

(C) Champions

== Top scorers ==
#	Player	Club	Goals
1	Omar Palma	Rosario Central	20
2	Jorge Comas	Boca Juniors	19
3	Franco Navarro	Independiente	18

== Relegation ==
- Deportivo Italiano were relegated with the worst points average (0.600)
- Temperley were relegated after losing 2–0 to Platense in the relegation playoff.

== Liguilla Pre-Libertadores ==
- Deportivo Armenio, Banfield and Belgrano qualified as the top 3 teams in the 2nd division.

Quarter finals

Home (1st leg)	Home (2nd leg)	1st Leg	2nd leg	Aggregate
Banfield	Independiente	1-0	0-2	1-2
Belgrano	Newell's Old Boys	0-0	0-2	0-2
Deportivo Armenio	Boca Juniors	2-4	0-2	2-6
Racing	Ferro Carril Oeste	0-0	1-2	1-2

Semi-finals

Home (1st leg)	Home (2nd leg)	1st Leg	2nd leg	Aggregate
Ferro Carril Oeste	Independiente	0-1	0-0	0-1
Newell's Old Boys	Boca Juniors	0-1	2-5	2-6

Final

Home (1st leg)	Home (2nd leg)	1st Leg	2nd leg	Aggregate
Independiente	Boca Juniors	2-2	2-1	4-3

- Independiente qualified for Copa Libertadores 1987.

== See also ==
- 1986–87 in Argentine football
