= Ézio =

Brazilian footballer

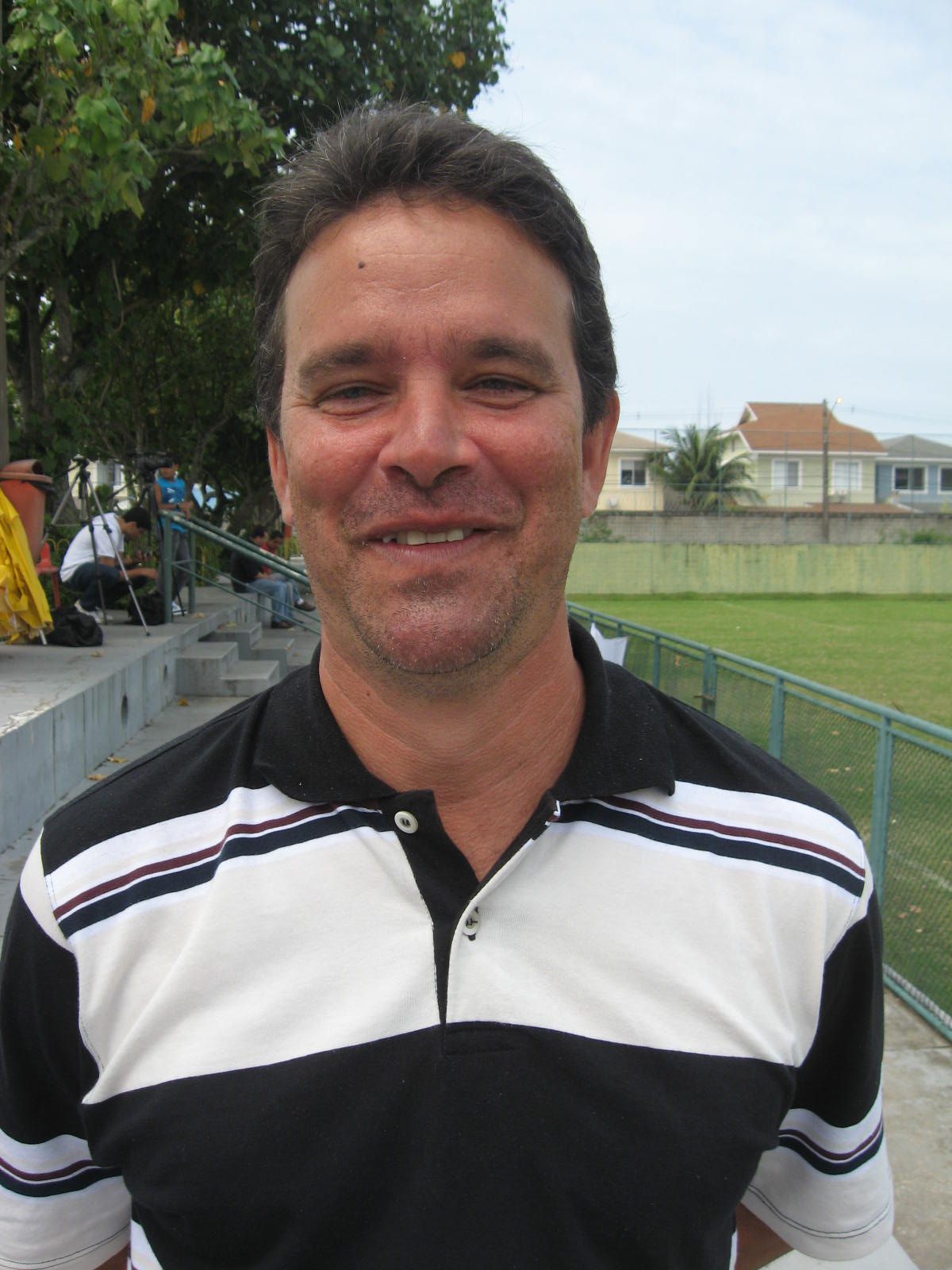
Ézio Leal Moraes Filho

Ézio Leal Moraes Filho (May 15, 1966 – November 9, 2011), best known as Ézio or Super-Ézio, was a Brazilian football player in striker role. He was born in Ponte de Itabapoana (currently Mimoso do Sul).

During his career (1986–1998) he played for Bangu, Olaria, Portuguesa, Fluminense (he scored for this club 118 goals in 236 matches), Atlético Mineiro, Americano Rio, CFZ do Rio, Rio Branco-ES and Internacional Limeira. He won, as a Fluminense player, one Rio de Janeiro State Championship in 1995, and two Guanabara Cup titles, in 1991 and 1993.

Ézio died of pancreatic cancer on November 9, 2011, in Rio de Janeiro. He was 45 years old.
