= Cairo Lima =

Brazilian footballer and manager (born 1976)

Personal information
- Full name: Cairo Roberto da Lima
- Date of birth: 16 September 1976 (age 50)
- Place of birth: Uberlândia, MG, Brazil
- Height: 1.85 m (6 ft 1 in)
- Position: Midfielder

Senior career*
| Years | Team | Apps | (Gls) |
| 1995–1997 | Atlético Mineiro | | |
| 1998 | Paraná | | |
| 1999–2000 | Atlético Mineiro | | |
| 2001 | Avaí | | |
| 2001 | Botafogo (SP) | | |
| 2002 | Ceará | | |
| 2003 | Paulista | | |
| 2004–2006 | Avaí | | |
| 2007 | Metropolitano | | |
| 2007–2008 | Gaz Mediaş | | |
| 2009 | Uberlândia | | |
| 2009 | Metropolitano | | |
| 2009 | Atlético de Ibirama | | |

Managerial career
- 2013: Atlético Paranaense (U-23)
- 2013: Volta Redonda
- 2017: Volta Redonda
- * Club domestic league appearances and goals

Cairo Roberto da Lima (born 16 September 1976), also known as Cairo Lima, is a Brazilian football manager and former player. Capable of playing both as a defender or midfielder, he had his greatest successes with Atlético Minero, and also played for other Brazilian clubs, such as Paraná, Avaí and Ceará.

After retiring from professional football, he has appointed as an assistant coach to Ricardo Drubscky with Volta Redonda and Atlético Paranaense, and led the team U-23. He later managed Volta Redonda where he managed to unexpectedly reach the semi-finals of the Taça Rio in 2013. After six years he returned to coach Volta Redonda in 2016, in an attempt to repeat his success.
