= Pedro Marchetta =

Argentine footballer and coach (1942–2022)

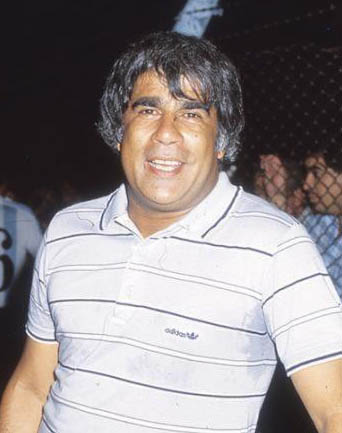

Personal information
- Full name: Jorge Pedro Marchetta
- Date of birth: 13 April 1942
- Place of birth: Lomas de Zamora, Argentina
- Date of death: 7 April 2022 (aged 79)
- Position: Midfielder

Senior career*
Years	Team	Apps	(Gls)
1962–1963	Racing		
1964–1965	Gimnasia y Esgrima La Plata		
1966	Los Andes		
1969	Santiago Morning		
1970	Deportivo Quito		
1971	Ever Ready		

Managerial career
- 1983: Los Andes
- 1984: Racing de Córdoba
- 1985: Rosario Central
- 1986: Vélez Sarsfield
- 1986: Talleres de Córdoba
- 1987: Belgrano (C)
- 1987–1988: Racing (C)
- 1992–1993: Independiente
- 1994–1995: Rosario Central
- 1995: Racing
- 1996–1997: Belgrano (C)
- 1998–1998: Los Andes
- 2001: Independiente Rivadavia
- 2002: Racing de Córdoba
- 2002–2003: Deportivo Quito
- 2004: Belgrano
- 2004–2005: Barcelona (ECU)
- 2006: General Paz Juniors
- * Club domestic league appearances and goals

Jorge Pedro Marchetta (13 April 1942 – 7 April 2022) was an Argentine professional football player and manager. Marchetta is widely regarded as one of the most charismatic managers in the history of Argentine football.

Despite his long career as manager, Marchetta won only one title in his career, the 1985 Primera B championship coaching Rosario Central that allowed the club to return to Primera División.

== Playing career ==
Born in Lomas de Zamora, Marchetta began his football career with Racing, making his debut for them in 1962, and later playing for Gimnasia y Esgrima La Plata, Los Andes, Santiago Morning, Deportivo Quito and Ever Ready of Dolores. He retired from playing at the age of 30 and, having trained as a bookkeeper, began managing a hotel.

== Coaching career ==
Marchetta began his coaching career as an assistant coach at Racing, before becoming manager of Los Andes in 1983. He later managed Racing de Córdoba, Rosario Central, Vélez Sarsfield, Talleres de Córdoba, Belgrano, Racing de Córdoba again, Independiente, Rosario Central again, Racing, Belgrano again, Los Andes again, Independiente Rivadavia, Racing de Córdoba again, Deportivo Quito, Belgrano again, Barcelona (ECU), and General Paz Juniors.

== Personal life ==
In 2006, Marchetta suffered a stroke, which forced him to put his career in a hiatus. He died in the Cordobese city of Villa Carlos Paz on 7 April 2022. He was 79 years old and still had sequels from the stroke.

== Titles ==
As manager:

Rosario Central

- Primera B (1): 1985
