= Rosario Central =

Sports club based in Rosario, Argentina

- Full name: Club Rosario Central
- Nicknames: Canalla; Los Guerreros
- Founded: 24 December 1889; 136 years ago
- Ground: Estadio Gigante de Arroyito
- Capacity: 46,955
- President: Gonzalo Belloso
- Manager: Jorge Almirón
- League: Primera División
- 2025: Champions (2025 Liga)
- Website: rosariocentral.com
Home colours	Away colours	Third colours

Club Atlético Rosario Central (Spanish pronunciation: [roˈsaɾjo senˈtɾal]), more commonly referred to as Rosario Central, or simply Central, is a sports club based in Rosario, Argentina, that plays in the Argentine Primera División. The club was officially founded on 24 December 1889, by a group of British railway workers, taking its name from the British-owned Central Argentine Railway company. One of the oldest Argentine and Latin American teams, it is considered a pioneer in its hometown and the only one of current Santa Fe province teams to have won an international title organised by CONMEBOL, the Copa Conmebol, won by the club in 1995.

Originally a member of the Rosario's Football Association, the club affiliated itself to the Argentine Football Association (AFA) in 1939. Since then, Rosario Central has won the Argentine Primera Division six times, with the last domestic title being the 2025 Liga. In addition, Rosario Central won seven National cups, being the 2026 Supercopa Internacional the last domestic cup title. Also, Rosario Central won the Copa CONMEBOL (the precursor of the current Copa Sudamericana) in 1995. In 2012, the club was considered by FIFA as one of the 11 most classical clubs in Argentine football.

Rosario Central has a long-standing rivalry with Newell's Old Boys, known as El Clásico Rosarino. Statistically, Rosario Central holds a significant lead in head-to-head victories, having won 20 more matches than their rivals. This competitive gap has been sustained for over 72 years, making it a notable record in Argentine football.

Rosario Central's home stadium is Estadio Gigante de Arroyito, one of the stadiums where Argentina played in the 1978 FIFA World Cup.

== History ==
=== The beginning ===
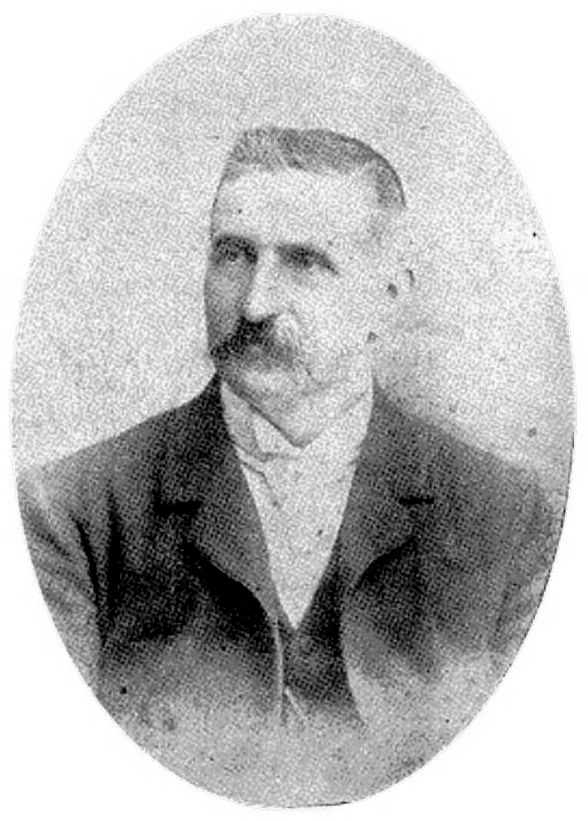
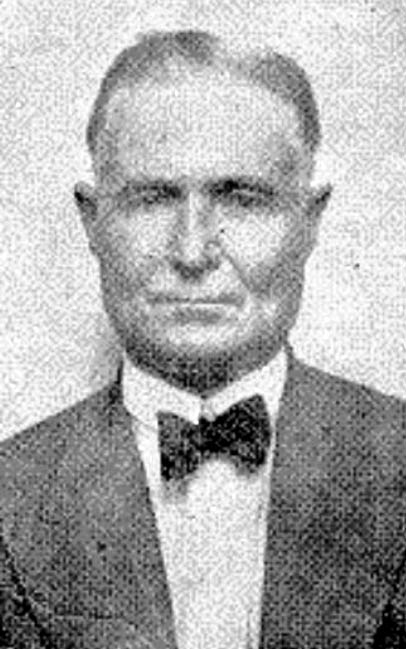
Two of the Rosario Central founders, (left): Colin Calder, also its first president); (right): Miguel Green, who was also a footballer for the club

By the end of the 1880s, a group of workers of British–owned company Central Argentine Railway used to play a kind of football game in fields located near Alberdi Avenue in Rosario. In the Christmas eve of 1889 they met at a bar with the purpose of establishing a club. British English citizen Thomas Mutton suggested the name "Central Argentine Railway Athletic Club", which was approved. British Scotsman Colin Calder was chosen as first president of the new club.

At the beginning, only CAR employees were admitted as members. The first field was located on a railway's land while a disused wagon served as club's headquarters. The first recorded game was played in 1890 when CARAC played a friendly match v the crew of a British ship's crew, which ended 1–1. A second match between both teams finished with CARAC winning 2–1.

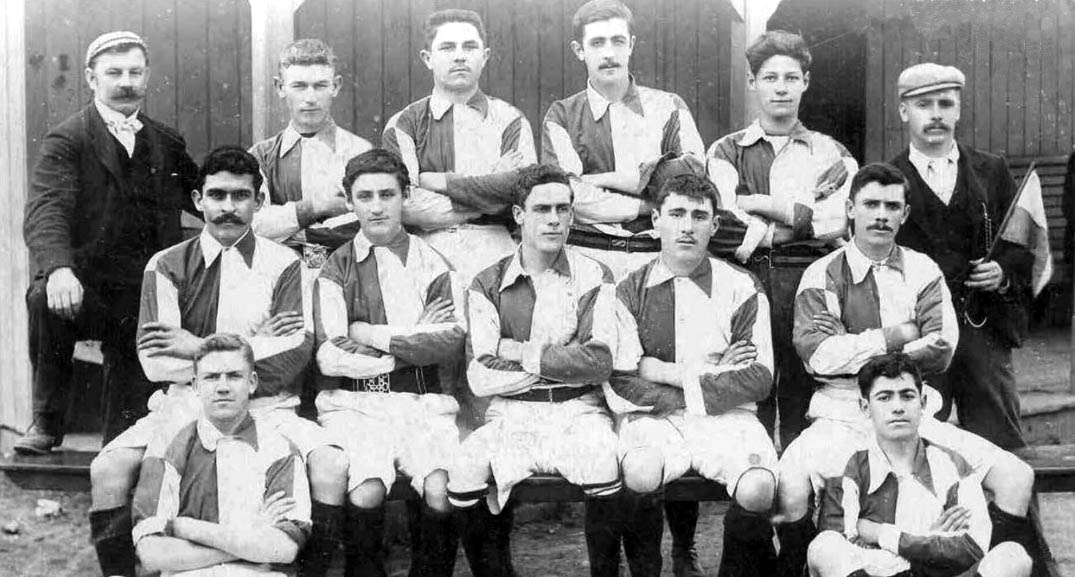
Football team of 1903, wearing the squared red and white shirt

During many years Central Argentine played only internal matches or faced the Rosario Cricket Club (current Club Atlético del Rosario) occasionally. In 1904 the railway companies Central Argentino and Buenos Aires merged, which caused a high number of criollo workers moved to Rosario. They quickly became football enthusiasts so the club increased its number of members to 130 people. During an assembly, executive Miguel Green (also forward of the team) suggested that people outside the railway company could be accepted as member of the club. The proposal was widely discussed until it was finally approved so the statute was modified, including the change of name to Spanish form "Club Atlético Rosario Central". Since those changes were approved, a significant number of workers of the city came to Rosario Central to become members of the club.

=== Liga Rosarina and National cups ===
The Liga Rosarina de Football (Rosario's Football League) was created in March 1905. The first tournament organised by the body was the "Copa Santiago Pinasco", named that way because the Mayor of Rosario, Santiago Pinasco, donated the trophy.

Central debuted on 21 May 1905, defeating Rosario A.C. by 3–1. On June, Rosario Central player Zenón Díaz was called for a Rosario combined that played a friendly match v English club Nottingham Forest (that was touring South America). The first official title won by Rosario Central came in 1908, when the squad won the "Copa Nicasio Vila" (the first division of LRF). The team finished unbeaten with 48 goals scored and only 9 conceded. Some notable players were Zenón Díaz, Harry Hayes, Augusto Winn, J.H. Grant, Juan Díaz.

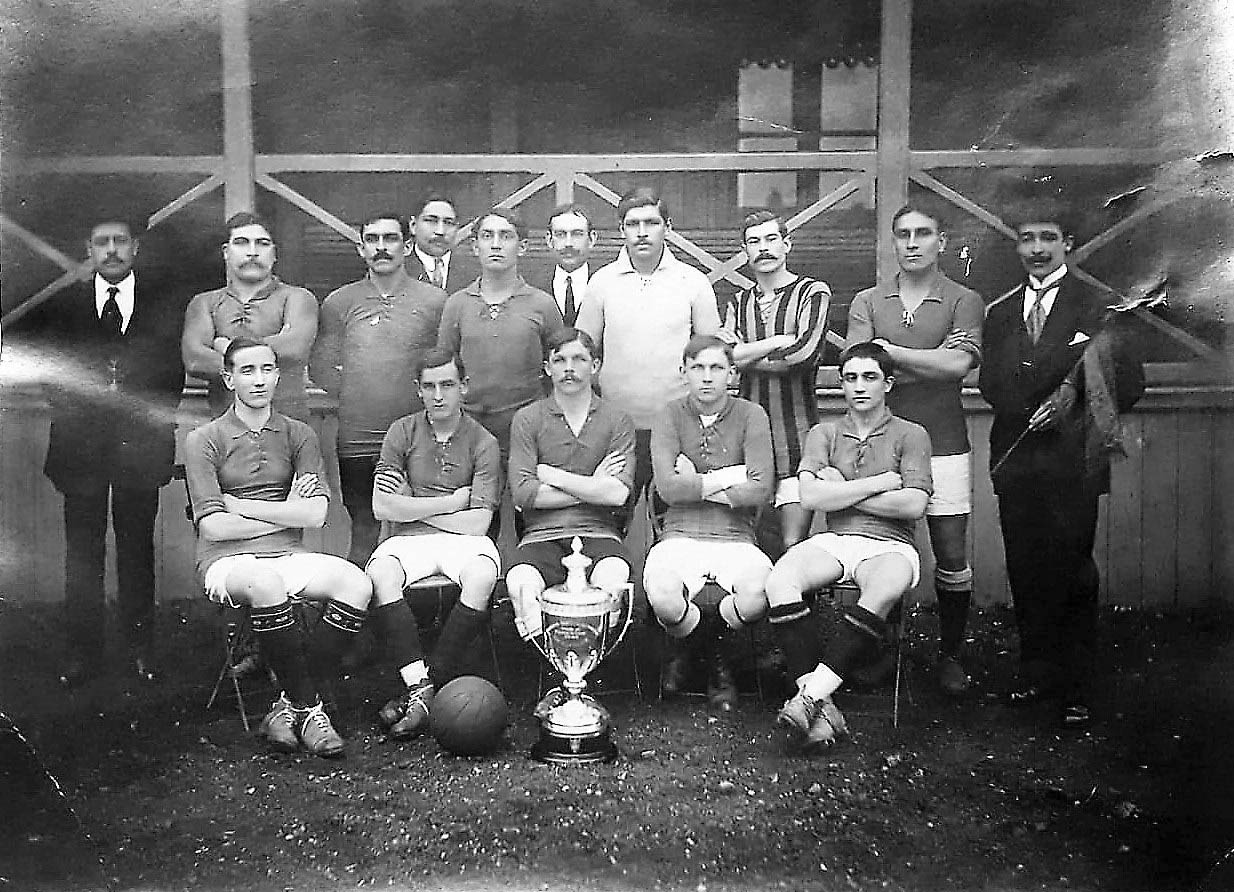
Rosario Central posing with its first national cup won, the Copa de Competencia La Nación in 1913

In 1913 the club disaffiliated from the Liga Rosarina, founding with other clubs the dissident "Federación Rosarina de Football". Central won this league in 1913. That same year, Rosario Central won its first national title, the Copa de Competencia La Nación, a domestic cup organised by dissident Federación Argentina de Football. Rosario Central won the competition after defeating Argentino de Quilmes 3–2 in Estadio G.E.B.A. of Buenos Aires.

In 1914 Central would return to Liga Rosarina, winning the championship after playing 20 matches, winning 19 games with 1 draw. The team scored 99 goals and only conceded 10, being Harry Hayes the top scorer of the tournament with 51 goals.

The squad also would win the 1915, 1916 and 1917 regional titles, becoming four-champion of the Rosarian League. In 1919, Central won the Rosario's league title again, winning 3–2 the final match against their history rivals: Newell's Old Boys.

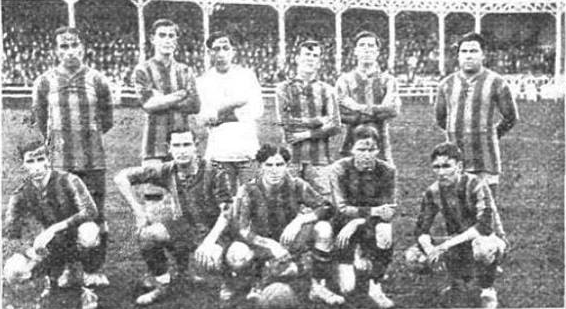
The Rosario Central squad that won the 1915 Copa Ibarguren after beating Racing Club

The second national title won by Rosario Central was the Copa Dr. Carlos Ibarguren, a trophy contested by the champions of Buenos Aires and Rosario. Central won the 1915 edition beating Racing Club (that had won three Primera División titles consecutively) 3–1 in the final.

In 1916 Central won the Copa de Honor Municipalidad de Buenos Aires after beating Independiente 1–0. That same year the Rosarino team won the Copa de Competencia Jockey Club defeating Independiente again. A new national title would come in 1920, when Central won the Copa de Competencia organised by dissident body Asociación Amateurs de Football (AAmF) against Sportivo Almagro. During the 1910 decade, Rosario Central won a total of five National cups.

In 1920 Rosario Central left the Rosarian League again, and joined other clubs to establish a dissident league, winning the 1920 and 1921 titles. Two years later, Central and the dissident clubs would return again to the Rosarian league.

In the following years, Central won the 1923, 1927, 1928 (won against Newell's in the final match), and 1930 championship, becoming the most successful team in Liga de Rosario's history.

In 1931 football became professional in Argentina, so a new Association, "Asociación Rosarina de Fútbol", was created in Rosario to organize the first professional championships. The Copa Nicasio Vila changed its name to "Torneo Gobernador Luciano Molinas", honoring then Governor of Santa Fe Province Luciano Molinas. Rosario Central won the 1937 and 1938 titles.

=== Coming to Primera División ===
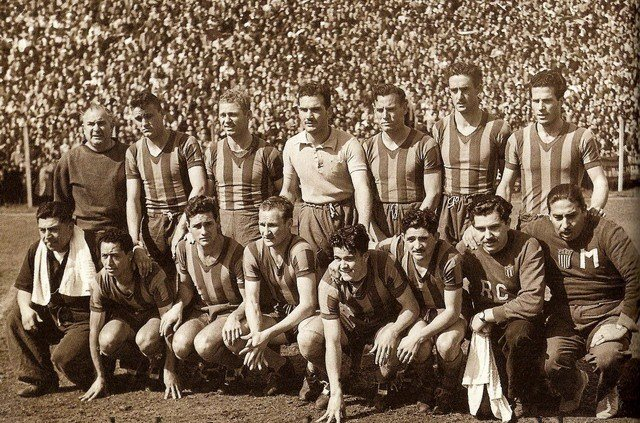
Central won its second promotion to Primera División in 1951

In 1939, Rosario Central and its arch-rival Newell's Old Boys requested Argentine Football Association to be added to the main league championship of Argentina, the Primera División. The Association accepted the requirement therefore both clubs joined the top-flight division of Argentine football.

Despite playing in the Primera División, Rosario Central continue contesting the Rosarian Football Association competitions with reserve teams formed by amateur footballers. During its first year in Primera División, Rosario Central finished 11° with 33 points earned (15 loses).

In 1941 Rosario Central was relegated to the second division, Primera B, after losing 20 matches with only 6 won. Nevertheless, Central only lasted one season in second division, returning one year later, after 25 matches won and only 4 lost. In 1950 Central was relegated again after a poor campaign in Primera. As its precedent relegation, Central promoted to the top division one year after being relegated, so the team returned to Primera in 1951.

=== First league titles ===
Rosario Central won its first national league title, in the 1971 Nacional championship with Angel Labruna as coach defeating San Lorenzo in the final game. Central had previously beat arch-rival Newell's 1–0 in semi-finals with a goal scored by Aldo Poy, who dove to head the ball before it touched the grass (a way of heading popularly known as "palomita" in South America). That goal is still remembered by Central supporters who usually reunite on 19 December, to recreate the goal. Many times Poy himself has taken part of the celebration. The second league title for the club came two years later, winning the 1973 Nacional with Carlos Griguol as coach. Some of the most notable players were Poy, Carlos Aimar and Eduardo Solari. The most frequent line-up was: Carlos Biasutto, Jorge González, Aurelio Pascuttini, Daniel Killer, Mario Killer, Carlos Aimar, Eduardo Solari, Aldo Poy, Ramón Bóveda, Roberto Cabral and Daniel Aricó.

For the 1974 season, Central acquired striker Mario Kempes from Instituto Atlético Central Córdoba (Kempes and Instituto mate Osvaldo Ardiles were to be reunited in the national team that won the 1978 World Cup).

After seven years without titles, Central won the 1980 Nacional with Ángel Tulio Zof on the bench. That team was called La Sinfónica (the Symphony Orchestra) because of the exquisite playing displayed by the team on the field. Central defeated Racing de Córdoba 5–0 in the first final game, and lost 2–0 in the second match but proclaimed champion due to goal average. Daniel Carnevali, Juan Carlos Ghielmetti, Edgardo Bauza, Oscar Craiyacich, Jorge García, José Gaitán, Daniel Sperandío, Eduardo Bacas, Félix Orte, Víctor Marchetti and Daniel Teglia was the frequent line-up on the fields.

After a few years with bad seasons, the team was relegated in 1984, but returned to first division just one year later after winning the Primera B championship, coached by Pedro Marchetta. Central returned to Primera to play the 1986–87 season, winning the title at the end of the tournament but coached by Zof again. This was a first in Argentine football (oddly, Central Español performed a similar feat in Uruguay in the years 1983–84, also a first).

The 1986–87 team was formed by Alejandro Lanari, Hernán Díaz, Jorge Balbis, Edgardo Bauza, Pedernera, Omar Palma, Adelqui Cornaglia, Roberto Gasparini, Osvaldo Escudero, Fernando Lanzidei and Hugo Galloni.

=== International titles ===
The first years of the decade of 1990 Central did not make good campaigns in domestic tournaments, although the team won the CONMEBOL Cup (the precursor of the current Copa Sudamericana) in 1995, being the only international title achieved by a Santa Fe Province based team to date. Central defeated Brazilian squad Atlético Mineiro 4–0 in Arroyito after losing by the same score in the first match in Brazil. Finally Central won the Cup by Penalty shoot-out, with a score of 4–3.

The club has participated in eleven editions of the Copa Libertadores, and is currently tied for fifth place with Estudiantes de la Plata and Vélez Sársfield, all of which trail participation leaders Boca Juniors, River Plate, Independiente, and San Lorenzo de Almagro.

=== Decline and resurrection ===
After the 2010 Clausura, Rosario Central's poor form over the past three years forced it into a relegation/promotion play-off against Nacional B side All Boys, which won the tie over two legs 4–1 on aggregate (defining the series with a thrashing 3–0 in Arroyito), relegating Rosario Central to Primera B Nacional, the second tier of Argentine football. It was the fourth time the club was relegated to play in the second division.

Rosario Central spent several seasons in the B Nacional until 19 May 2013, when the squad secured the promotion to Primera División after beating Gimnasia y Esgrima de Jujuy by 3–0. The three goals were scored by Javier Toledo. The team was coached by Miguel Ángel Russo.

=== The eleventh official title: Copa Argentina ===
In May 2018, the club saw the return of Edgardo Bauza as Central's coach in his second tenure. Bauza stated that "I knew no other objective than to be champion with Central". Edgardo Bauza led Rosario Central to the championship title after 23 years.

Rosario Central started their run in the 2017–18 Copa_Argentina in the round of 32, where the Auriazules faced Juventud Antoniana with a 6–0 win. Then, in both the Round of 24 and Round of 16, the Canalla drew both matches: the first goalless against Talleres de Córdoba, advancing 5–3 on penalties. In the Round of 16, the Arroyito club drew 1–1 against Almagro and defeated them 5–4 on penalty kicks.224

In the quarter-finals, Central and Newell's played a new Rosario derby. As in 1969 and 1970, the 'Blue and yellows' again defeated their arch-rivals and advanced to the semi-finals with goals by Herrera and Zampedri, with Torres scoring the equaliser for Newell's.225

Central faced Temperley in the semi-finals. The match ended in a 1–1 draw after a goal by the light blue side in the last minutes of the match. However, Los Canallas eventually won on penalties 4-2, qualifying for their fourth Copa Argentina final.226

The cup final was played on 6 December at the Malvinas Argentinas stadium in Mendoza against Gimnasia y Esgrima de La Plata. In this final, both teams were looking to put an end to a streak of more than twenty years without silverware.227 Central won the first half with a goal by Zampedri, but in the second half Lorenzo Faravelli equalised. The tie remained equal throughout the ninety minutes, and a penalty shoot-out was forced. There, the Rosarinos scored four and Gimansia only one - previously one had been deflected and another had been saved by goalkeeper Jeremías Ledesma - to make Central champions of the Copa Argentina for the first time in their history. It also gave them qualification for the 2019 Copa Libertadores and the 2018 Supercopa Argentina.

The starting line-up for that match was Jeremías Ledesma, Josué Ayala, Miguel Barbieri, Matías Caruzzo, Óscar Cabezas, Marcelo Ortiz, Alfonso Parot, Elías Gómez, Gonzalo Bettini, Nahuel Gómez, Diego Arismendi, Leonardo Gil, Joaquín Pereyra, Néstor Ortigoza, Andrés Lioi, José Luis Fernández, Washington Camacho, Federico Carrizo, Maximiliano Lovera, Fernando Zampedri, Marco Ruben, Agustín Maziero and Germán Herrera.

=== Miguel Angel Russo's return and the twelfth championship title ===
On 19 December 2022, after Gonzalo Belloso won the presidential elections at Rosario Central, Miguel Ángel Russo was re-hired by the Rosario club to lead the team in the 2023 season, thus assuming his fifth cycle at the club, replacing Carlos Tevez.

Miguel Russo arrived in January 2023 and was the champion coach with Central in December of that year, when the squad won the 2023 Copa de la Liga. Under the experienced coach, Rosario Central had a very successful 2023: they were 8th in the first half of the year, and champions in the Professional League Cup 2023, played in the second half. In addition, the Auriazul team was the only team in the Primera División that did not lose at home in the whole calendar year, having made the Gigante de Arroyito a fortress. The champion's title (and also the accumulation of points in the Annual Table) allowed them to qualify for the 2024 Copa Libertadores.

The second half of the year saw the 2023 Professional League Cup. The start of the tournament saw an inconsistent Central, winning home games but failing to win away. Everything started to improve on matchday 7, when the 'Auriazul' team defeated their classic rivals 1–0 at the Estadio Gigante de Arroyito, and from that victory against Newell's Old Boys, they did not know defeat for the rest of the championship. Finally, Central qualified for the playoffs on the last matchday of the regular phase, after defeating Arsenal 2–1 away. It finished in fourth place in its zone, and thus was able to fight for the championship.

In the knockout rounds, the 'Canalla' went through beating big teams until they reached the definition for the title: they beat Racing Club in the quarter-finals on penalties (they had started 2–0, drew 2–2 and ended up winning on penalties). In the semis, they did the same against River Plate, in a tough 0–0 draw at the Mario Alberto Kempes Stadium in Córdoba, which was also decided by penalties, and showed Rosario goalkeeper Jorge Broun as the outstanding figure, saving 3 penalty kicks from the 12 steps. Finally, Rosario Central celebrated a new championship title at the Estadio Único Madre de Ciudades de Santiago del Estero, where more than 25,000 Canallas fans accompanied the team and filled the Santiago del Estero stadium with the illusion of a new title. In an even and hard-fought match, Rosario Central beat Club Atlético Platense 1–0 in the final with a beautiful goal by Maximiliano Lovera 39 minutes into the first half, and thus was able to crown the 12th official title in its history.

The roster was composed of Jorge Broun, Axel Werner, Valentino Quintero, Carlos Quintana, Agustín Sández, Damián Martínez, Juan Cruz Komar, Facundo Mallo, Alan Rodríguez, Ulises Ciccioli, Ismael Cortéz, Facundo Agüero, Kevin Silva, Fernando Rodríguez, Francis Mac Allister, Walter Montoya, Agustín Toledo, Ignacio Malcorra, Jaminton Campaz, Dannovi Quiñonez, Francesco Lo Celso, Lautaro Giaccone, Giovanni Bogado, Marcelo Acosta, Tomás O'Connor, Leandro Iglesias, Kevin Ortíz, Tobías Cervera, Maximiliano Lovera, Octavio Bianchi, Juan Cruz Cerrudo, Luca Martínez Dupuy, Fabricio Oviedo, Agustín Módica.

== Uniform ==
=== Uniform evolution ===
1899–1903	1903–04 (Note: A commemorative edition of this uniform was released as the alternate kit for the 2012–13 season.)	1905–11	1912–present

=== Kit manufacturers and jersey sponsors ===
Starting in 2025, all the clothing line is provided by Le Coq Sportif.

Kit Manufacturer
Period	Brand
1977–1982	Adidas
1983–1992	Topper
1992–1993	Uhlsport
1993–1995	Penalty
1995–1998	Le Coq Sportif
1998–2000	Umbro
2000–2006	Puma
2006–2009	Kappa
2009–2012	Puma
2012–2014	Olympikus
2015–2018	Nike
2019–2021	Under Armour
2022–2024	Umbro
2025–	Le Coq Sportif

Shirt Sponsor
Period	Brand
1985–1986	Zanella
1986	Aurora Grundig
1987–1992	Zanella
1992–1998	General Paz Seguros
1998–2001	Cablehogar
2001–2002	-
2002–2005	Transatlántica
2005–2009	Paladini
2009–2011	Ciudad Ribera
2011–2014	Ingeconser
2014–2017	Banco Municipal
2018–2019	TCL Corporation
2020–2021	Banco Municipal
2021	Adelante Broker
2022–	City Center Rosario

== Stadium ==
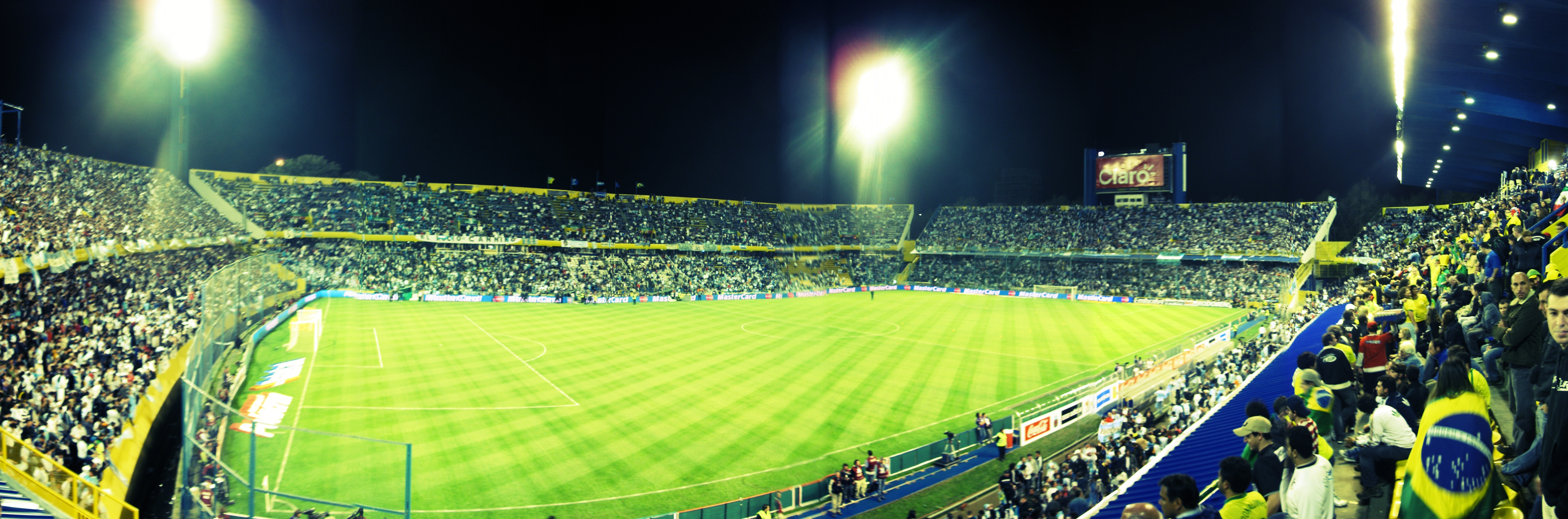
Gigante de Arroyito Stadium.

Rosario Central plays in the Gigante de Arroyito stadium, located in the confluence of Avellaneda Boulevard and Génova Avenue, in the Lisandro de la Torre neighborhood (popularly known as Arroyito), in north-east Rosario. It has an official capacity of 46,955 spectators.

The stadium was one of the venues chosen for the 1978 FIFA World Cup. In that tournament, all three-second-round games of the Argentine squad were played in the Gigante. Local hero Kempes enjoyed the support of the fans and went on to become the top scorer of the tournament. Besides, the Gigante de Arroyito was one of the venues for the 1987 Copa América, hosted by Argentina.

== Nicknames ==
Central's common nickname is canallas ("rabble", "scoundrels", which is a rather mild insult in Argentina) because it is said that the club refused to play a charity match for a leprosy clinic in the 1920s; rival side Newell's acquired the leprosos (lepers) nickname when it did play in that event.

Another version states that in 1928 the Central supporters burned down some canvas near the Club Belgrano stadium (which Central had a strong rivalry). When the Belgrano supporters saw that, they started to shout to them: "You're scoundrels! Scoundrels!".

In January 2007, Roberto Fontanarrosa a Rosario native and a devout fan of the club, created a logo that revised the definition and spelling of Central's nickname. The new spelling he gave was canaya, because according to him, people from the city of Rosario use and pronounce the word with a "y" for the sole purpose of referring to the club fans.

Central is also known as La Academia (like the fellow Argentine team Racing Club) due to the number of players that become professional from the youth teams; but also to the number of consecutive titles that the club won in the Rosario's League (at an amateur level), in comparison to what Racing Club did in the Buenos Aires' League.

== Supporters ==
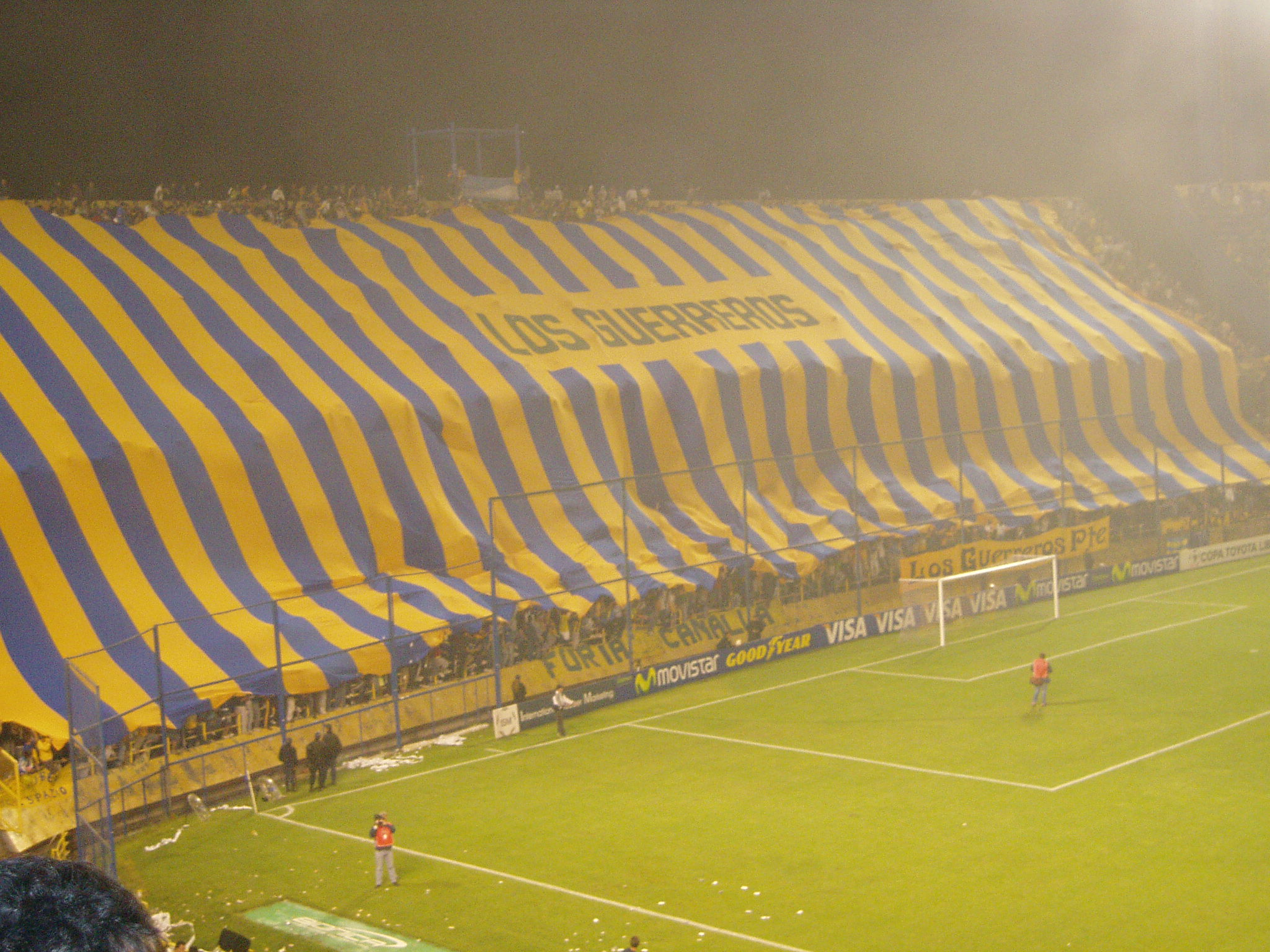
Central fans displaying a gigantic flag.

Rosario Central's supporters are considered one of the most significant of Argentina. The Newspaper Olé was published last 5 January 2008 by a recent study realized by the English magazine UK Football. The same one, published that a ranking with the 50 most vibrant supporters of the world. The results were the following ones: as first, Milan represents the supporters of the AC, then that of Real Madrid, and third that of the Galatasaray of Turkey. Between the Argentinians that of Rosario Central turns out to be like first in the position 14, second that of River Plate in the position 20, third turn out to be the supporters of Boca Juniors in 23, and fourth that of Racing Club in the place number 48. It is provided also with certain proper rituals, as being the " Throwing of Towel ", on 23 November in recognition to the party that Rosario Central imposed on his rival for 4 on 0 and this one was considered finished to 11 minutes of the second half, is known as the day of the abandonment, or the celebration of the " Day of the Friend Canaya ", which is celebrated on 19 July (date of death of Roberto Fontanarrosa) and the most important, the celebration of the Little dove of Poy, who celebrates all on 19 December in different cities of the world, raised an order so that between to the book Guinness as the most celebrated goal of the history

== In popular culture ==
Rosario Central has featured in many films, books, songs and plays. The club has also featured on several occasions in prose. Roberto Fontanarrosa's story 19 de diciembre de 1971 is about a fan who travels to Buenos Aires for a Semi-final match against Newell's Old Boys.

Celebrity fans include Alberto "El Negro" Olmedo, Rita la Salvaje, Libertad Lamarque, some writers such as Osvaldo Bayer and Roberto Fontanarrosa, and some musicians as well as Fito Páez, Juan Carlos Baglietto, Joaquín Sabina are all fans of the club.

Some of the films in which Club Atlético Rosario Central plays a leading role are: "Un crimen argentino" (An Argentinean Crime) by director Lucas Combina, based on a true story that took place in 1980 in Rosario, written by the Rosario journalist and writer Reynaldo Sietecase, there are references to the championship won that year by Rosario Central, and to the semi-finals with Newell's Old Boys played in the aforementioned national tournament. There are also references to the fans of Central in the film released in 2001 called Rosarigasinos (named after a slang used by the proletarian and lumpen sectors of the city in the 1920s and 30s).

Ernesto "Che" Guevara, a major figure of the Cuban Revolution, was a Rosario Central fan.

== Players ==
=== Current squad ===
As of 9 August 2026

Note: Flags indicate national team as defined under FIFA eligibility rules; some limited exceptions apply. Players may hold more than one non-FIFA nationality.

No.	Pos.	Nation	Player
1	GK	ARG	Axel Werner (on loan from Elche)
2	DF	PAR	Sebastián Zaracho
3	DF	PAR	Agustín Sández
4	DF	ARG	Ulises Ciccioli
5	MF	ARG	Franco Ibarra
6	DF	ARG	Juan Cruz Komar
8	FW	COL	Jáminton Campaz
9	FW	ARG	Marco Ruben
10	FW	ARG	Franco Cervi
11	FW	ARG	Ángel Di María (captain)
13	DF	ARG	Gastón Ávila (on loan from Ajax)
15	DF	URU	Facundo Mallo
16	FW	ARG	Tomás Badaloni
18	FW	ARG	Julián Fernández (on loan from New York City)
19	MF	ARG	Santiago Segovia

No.	Pos.	Nation	Player
20	MF	CHI	Vicente Pizarro
22	FW	ARG	Enzo Copetti
23	GK	ARG	Conan Ledesma
24	DF	ARG	Juan Giménez
26	FW	ARG	Giovanni Cantizano
27	FW	ARG	Gaspar Duarte
28	MF	ARG	Pol Fernández
31	MF	ARG	Federico Navarro
32	DF	ARG	Emanuel Coronel
33	DF	ARG	Alexis Soto (on loan from Defensa y Justicia)
38	GK	ARG	Damián Fernández
39	FW	ARG	Fabricio Oviedo
46	DF	ARG	Ignacio Ovando
47	DF	ARG	Luca Raffin
88	MF	URU	Alan Rodríguez (on loan from Internacional)

=== Reserve squad ===
Note: Flags indicate national team as defined under FIFA eligibility rules; some limited exceptions apply. Players may hold more than one non-FIFA nationality.

No.	Pos.	Nation	Player
7	MF	ARG	Marcelo Cabrera
12	GK	ARG	Ezequiel Zapata
14	DF	ARG	Asael Oviedo
17	FW	ARG	Ignacio Moreno
19	FW	ARG	Thiago Ponce
21	DF	ARG	Santiago Burgos
25	MF	ARG	Juan Ignacio Guzmán
30	MF	ARG	Tomás Salteño
34	MF	ARG	Samuel Beltrán
35	MF	ARG	Lucas Ramos
36	DF	ARG	Álvaro Güich
37	FW	PAR	Lisandro Duarte

No.	Pos.	Nation	Player
40	MF	ARG	Bautista Cantero
41	DF	ARG	Leonardo Ríos
42	DF	ARG	Elías Verón
43	MF	ARG	Kevin Gutiérrez
44	MF	ARG	Paolo Giaccone
45	DF	ARG	Juan Ignacio Scaglia
48	GK	PAR	Leonardo Sosa
49	FW	ARG	Paulo Bustos
50	MF	ARG	Joaquín Espina
51	DF	ARG	Marco Vicente
52	DF	ARG	Franco Castorani

=== Out on loan ===
Note: Flags indicate national team as defined under FIFA eligibility rules; some limited exceptions apply. Players may hold more than one non-FIFA nationality.

No.	Pos.	Nation	Player
7	FW	ARG	Maximiliano Lovera (at Independiente Santa Fe until 31 December 2026)
9	FW	SYR	Tobías Cervera (at 2 de Mayo until 31 December 2026)
11	FW	ARG	Luciano Ferreyra (at San Martín-T until 31 December 2026)
16	DF	PAR	Alan Rodríguez (at Olimpia until 31 December 2026)
17	FW	ARG	Franco Frías (at Cobresal until 31 December 2026)
19	DF	ARG	Agustín Bravo (at Instituto until 31 December 2026)

No.	Pos.	Nation	Player
23	MF	PAR	Giovanni Bogado (at Sportivo Luqueño until 31 December 2026)
27	MF	PAR	Marcelo Acosta (at 2 de Mayo until 31 December 2026)
30	MF	ARG	Tomás O'Connor (at Gimnasia-M until 31 December 2026)
37	DF	ARG	Elías Ocampo (at Colegiales until 31 December 2026)
45	MF	ARG	Kevin Ortiz (at Atlético Tucumán until 31 December 2026)
49	DF	ARG	Kevin Silva (at Montevideo City Torque until 31 December 2026)

=== Individual records ===
==== Top scorers ====
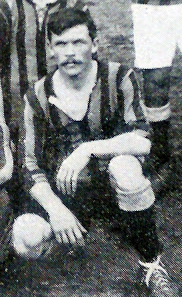
Harry Hayes, Rosario Central all-time top scorer with 217 goals. He is also the top scorer in the Rosario derby with 21 goals

No.	Player	Pos.	Tenure	Goals
1	(Argentina) Harry Hayes (Note: This statistic includes goals in Liga Rosarina de Football competitions.)	FW	1907–26	221
2	(Argentina) Ennis Hayes	FW	1912, 1913–23, 1927	158
3	(Argentina) Marco Ruben	FW	2004–07, 2016–18, 2020–22, 2024-	105
4	(Argentina) Luis Indaco	FW	1922–25, 1926–32	99
5	(Argentina) Waldino Aguirre	FW	1941–46, 1950–51	98
6	(Argentina) Mario Kempes	FW	1974–76	94
7	(Argentina) Edgardo Bauza	DF	1977–82, 1986–89, 1991	83
8	(Argentina) Miguel Juárez	FW	1956–64	68
9	(Argentina) Juan Antonio Pizzi	FW	1988–90, 1999–00, 2001	66
10	(Argentina) Rubén Bravo	FW	1941–43	65

=== Current coaching staff ===
Position	Staff
Head coach	(Argentina) Jorge Almirón
Assistant coach	(Argentina) Pablo Manusovich
Assistant coach	(Argentina) Pablo Ricchetti
Assistant coach	(Argentina) Eduardo Bustos Montoya
Fitness coach	(Argentina) José Altieri
Fitness coach	(Argentina) Daniel Díaz Leyton
Fitness coach	(Argentina) Miguel Quiroga
Goalkeeping coach	(Argentina) Hernán Castellano
Doctor	(Argentina) Hernán Giuria
Doctor	(Argentina) Carlos Buttó
Kinesiologist	(Argentina) Eduardo Brienzo
Kinesiologist	(Argentina) Leandro Arri
Kinesiologist	(Argentina) Guillermo Sfalcini
Nutritionist	(Argentina) Cecilia Delpupo
Nutritionist	(Argentina) Antonella Bonapace
Technical director	(Argentina) Federico Lussenhoff
Performance analyst	(Argentina) Alejo Berardi
Analyst	(Argentina) Lisandro Vita
Technical secretary	(Argentina) Gustavo Ricúpero
Security and kit man	(Argentina) Jorge Cambiasso
Security and kit man	(Argentina) Sergio Villareal
Security and kit man	(Argentina) Héctor Cardozo

Last updated: 27 April 2025
Source: Cuerpo Técnico

== Managers ==
- (Hungary) György Orth (1945)
- (Uruguay) Hugo Bagnulo (1965)
- (Argentina) Manuel Giúdice (1966)
- (Argentina) Omar Sívori (1969–70)
- (Argentina) Ángel Tulio Zof (1970–71)
- (Argentina) Carlos Timoteo Griguol (1971), (1971)
- (Argentina) Ángel Labruna (1971–72) (Note: won the 1971 Primera División)
- (Argentina) Ángel Tulio Zof (1972–73)
- (Argentina) Carlos Timoteo Griguol (1973–75) (Note: won the 1973 Primera División)
- (Uruguay) José Ricardo De León (1975)
- (Argentina) José María Silvero (1976)
- (Argentina) Alfio Basile (1976)
- (Argentina) Carlos Timoteo Griguol (1977–78)
- (Argentina) Ángel Tulio Zof (1979)
- (Argentina) Roberto Saporiti (1980)
- (Argentina) Ángel Tulio Zof (1980–82) (Note: won the 1980 Primera División)
- (Argentina) Vicente Cayetano Rodríguez (1983)
- (Argentina) Aurelio Pascuttini (1984)
- (Argentina) Miguel Ángel López (1984)
- (Argentina) Pedro Marchetta (1985)
- (Argentina) Ángel Tulio Zof (1986–90) (Note: won the 1986-87 Primera División)
- (Argentina) Carlos Aimar (1991)
- (Argentina) Ángel Tulio Zof (1991)
- (Argentina) Eduardo Solari (1992)
- (Argentina) Carlos Aimar (1992)
- (Argentina) Vicente Cantatore (1993)
- (Argentina) Pedro Marchetta (1994-95)
- (Argentina) Ángel Tulio Zof (1995–97) (Note: won the 1995 Copa Conmebol)
- (Argentina) Miguel Ángel Russo (1997–98)
- (Argentina) Edgardo Bauza (1998–01)
- (Argentina) Juan José López (2001–02)
- (Argentina) César Luis Menotti (July 1, 2002 – 15 Nov 2)
- (Argentina) Miguel Ángel Russo (2002–04)
- (Argentina) Hugo Galloni (2004)
- (Uruguay) Víctor Púa (July 1, 2004 – 23 Aug 4)
- (Argentina) Ángel Tulio Zof (2004), (2005), (2005–06)
- (Argentina) Hugo Galloni (2006)
- (Argentina) Carlos Ischia (March 26, 2007 – 23 Oct 7)
- (Argentina) Leonardo Madelón (July 1, 2007 – 30 June 8)
- (Argentina) Pablo Sánchez (July 1, 2008 – 5 Oct 8)
- (Argentina) Gustavo Alfaro (Oct 10, 2008 – 2 March 9)
- (Argentina) Reinaldo Merlo (March 2, 2009 – 14 May 9)
- (Argentina) Miguel Ángel Russo (April 17, 2009 – 13 July 2009)
- (Argentina) Leonardo Madelón (March 28, 2010 – 30 June 10)
- (Argentina) Reinaldo Merlo (July 5, 2010 – 24 Oct 10)
- (Argentina) Héctor Rivoira (Oct 24, 2010 – 28 March 11)
- (Argentina) Omar Palma (March 29, 2011 – 30 June 11)
- (Argentina) Juan Antonio Pizzi (July 1, 2011 – 5 July 12)
- (Argentina) Miguel Ángel Russo (6 July 2012–14)
- (Argentina) Hugo Galloni (2014)
- (Argentina) Eduardo Coudet (2015–2016)
- (Uruguay) Paolo Montero (2017)
- (Argentina) Leonardo Fernández (2017–2018)
- (Argentina) Edgardo Bauza (2018–2019) (Note: won the 2018 Copa Argentina)
- (Argentina) Diego Cocca (2019–2020)
- (Argentina) Kily González (2020–2022)
- (Argentina) Carlos Tevez (2022)
- (Argentina) Miguel Ángel Russo (2023–2024) (Note: won the 2023 Copa de la Liga)
- (Argentina) Matías Lequi (2024)
- (Argentina) Ariel Holan (2024–2025) (Note: won the 2025 Primera División)
- (Argentina) Jorge Almirón (2025–)

== Honours ==
=== Senior titles ===
Keys

- Record
- ^{(s)} Shared record

Type	Competition	Titles	Winning years
National (League)	Primera División	5	1971 Nacional, 1973 Nacional, 1980 Nacional, 1986–87, 2025 Liga (Note: The AFA awarded Rosario Central a league title due to having earned the most points in the entire season (2025 aggregate table). As the 2025 Tournament Rules stated that changes could be made (prior approval by the Executive Committee) with the season in progress, president Claudio Tapia presented an initiative to award a league title to Rosario Central, which was approved and carried out by the committee in November. The title was awarded with retroactivity since this 2025 season and it was established by AFA that will be disputed in the future seasons too. The decision to award the “Campeón de Liga” title to Rosario Central caused wide controversy as the trophy was not announced before the end of the Clausura regular season.)
National (Cups)	Copa de Competencia La Nación (FAF)	1^{(s)}	1913 (Note: Organized by dissident association, "Federación Argentina de Football", in 1913 and 1914.)
National (Cups)	Copa Ibarguren	1	1915
National (Cups)	Copa de Honor MCBA	1	1916
National (Cups)	Copa de Competencia Jockey Club	1	1916
National (Cups)	Copa de Competencia (AAmF)	1	1920
National (Cups)	Copa Argentina	1	2018
National (Cups)	Copa de la Liga Profesional	1	2023
National (Cups)	Supercopa Internacional	1	2026
International	Copa CONMEBOL	1	1995

=== Other titles ===
Titles won in lower divisions:

- Primera B Nacional (1): 2012–13
- Primera B Metropolitana (3): 1942, 1951, 1985

=== Regional ===
- Liga Rosarina
  - Copa Nicasio Vila (10): 1908, 1914, 1915, 1916, 1917, 1919, 1923, 1927, 1928, 1930
  - Copa Damas de Caridad (4): 1910, 1914, 1915, 1916
  - Copa Estímulo (1): 1922
- Federación Rosarina (1) (Note: Dissident association of Rosario): 1913
- Asociación Amateurs Rosarina (2): 1920, 1921
- Asociación Rosarina de Fútbol (Note: In 1939 the senior squad of Rosario Central begun to participate in the Argentine's top division, Primera División. From then on, the club has taken part in regional tournaments by the ARF with reserve teams only.)
  - Torneo Luciano Molinas (2): 1937, 1938
  - Torneo Preparación (1): 1936
  - Torneo Hermenegildo Ivancich (1): 1937
- Federación Santafersina de Fútbol
  - Copa Santa Fe (1) (Note: Regional cup in Santa Fe Province, first held in 2016.): 2017
