= Víctor Marchetti =

Argentine footballer

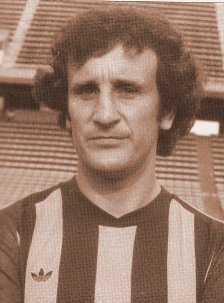
Marchetti in 1980

Víctor Rodolfo Marchetti (born 1950) is an Argentine former footballer.

He began his career with Club Atlético River Plate, and made 174 appearances for the club. He played for Unión de Santa Fe from 1975 to 1976 and again in 1984. In 1976, he was an Argentine Primera División topscorer. Marchetti spent two seasons playing for San Lorenzo de Almagro.
