= Ángel Tulio Zof =

Argentine footballer and coach

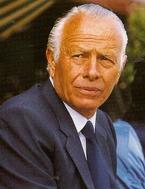

Personal information
- Full name: Ángel Tulio Zof
- Date of birth: July 8, 1928
- Place of birth: Rosario, Argentina
- Date of death: November 26, 2014 (aged 86)
- Place of death: Rosario, Argentina
- Position: Defender

Senior career*
Years	Team	Apps	(Gls)
1947–1955	Rosario Central	56	(0)
1956	Huracán	11	(0)
- Quilmes
- Oro
- Club Celaya
- Atlético Morelia

Managerial career
- 1965–1967: Newell's Old Boys
- 1968: Los Andes
- 1969: Newell's Old Boys
- 1969-1970: Los Andes
- 1970-1971: Rosario Central
- 1971: Atlanta
- 1972–1973: Rosario Central
- 1976–1978: Atlético Ledesma
- 1979: Rosario Central
- 1980–1982: Rosario Central
- 1983: Platense
- 1984: Atlético Ledesma
- 1986–1990: Rosario Central
- 1991: Rosario Central
- 1992–1993: San Martín Tucumán
- 1995–1997: Rosario Central
- 2004–2005: Rosario Central
- 2005–2006: Rosario Central
- * Club domestic league appearances and goals as of 5 September 2007

Ángel Tulio Zof (July 8, 1928 – November 26, 2014) was an Argentine footballer and coach.

== Career ==
He played for Rosario Central, Huracán, Atlanta and Quilmes as a left winger. Internationally, he played for, among other teams, Toronto F.C. (Canada) and Hakoah (New York). Later, he became the coach of Ledesma de Jujuy, Club Atlético Platense, Atlanta, San Martín (T), Newell's Old Boys, Rosario Central, Los Andes.

As manager of Rosario Central he came second in the Argentine championship in 1970, won the "Nacional" championship in 1980, the 1986/87 championship, and the Copa Conmebol in 1995. He only won the championship in his hometown team of Rosario Central where he managed 525 matches, won 200, drew 186 and lost 137. In December 2006 he logged his 900th game as manager.

== Death ==
Zof died in Buenos Aires, Argentina, aged 86.
