= Omar Palma =

Argentine footballer and manager (1958–2024)

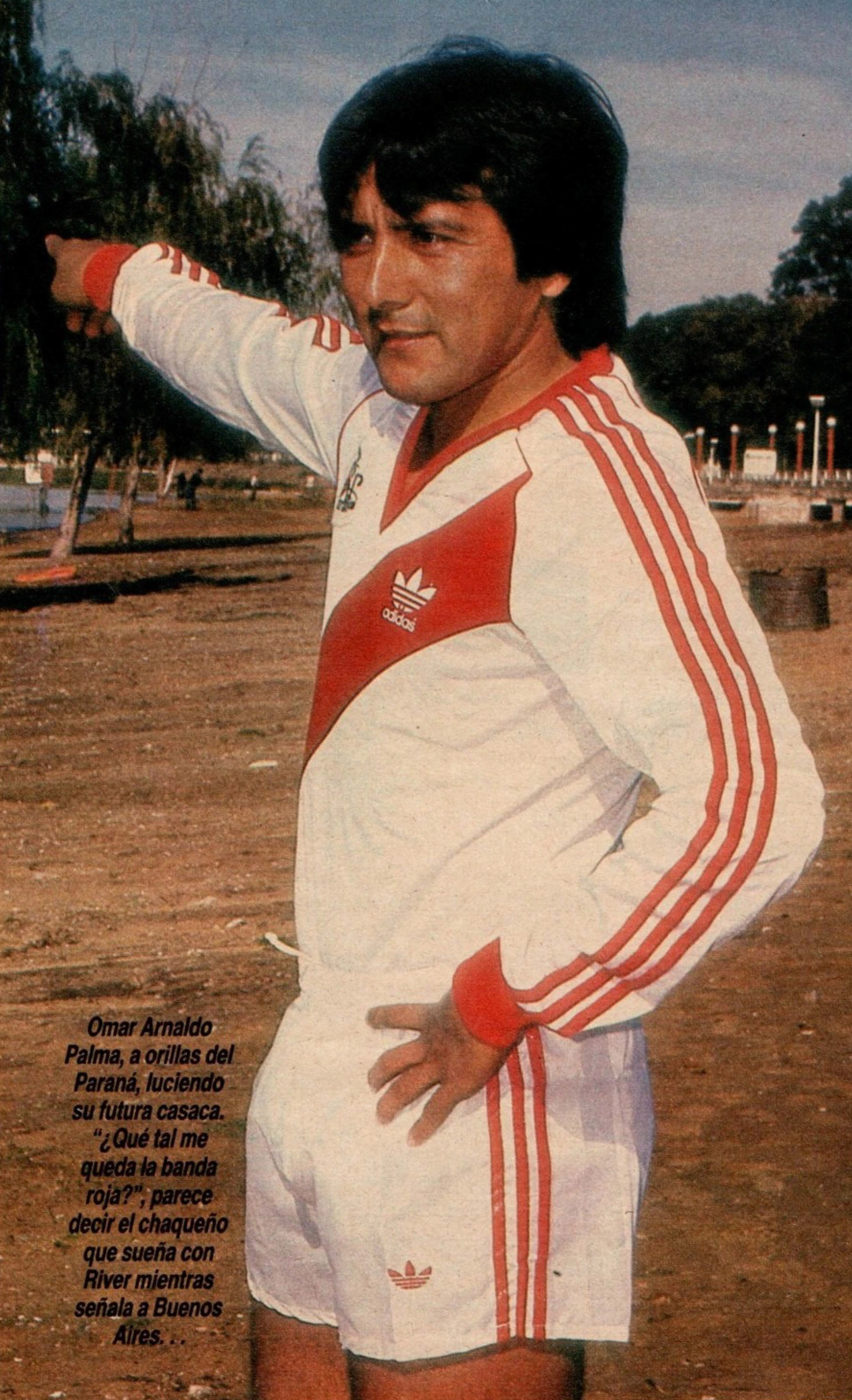
- Palma in 1987

Personal information
- Full name: Omar Arnaldo Palma
- Date of birth: April 12, 1958
- Place of birth: Campo Largo, Chaco Province, Argentina
- Date of death: October 8, 2024 (aged 66)
- Place of death: Rosario, Santa Fe Province, Argentina
- Height: 1.65 m (5 ft 5 in)
- Position: Midfielder

Youth career
- 1968–1979: Rosario Central

Senior career*
Years	Team	Apps	(Gls)
1979–1985	Rosario Central	166	(24)
1986	Colón	17	(5)
1986–1987	Rosario Central	38	(20)
1987–1989	River Plate	44	(7)
1989–1992	Veracruz	103	(7)
1992–1998	Rosario Central	168	(13)

Managerial career
- 2011: Rosario Central
- 2011–2012: Central Córdoba
- * Club domestic league appearances and goals

Omar Palma (April 12, 1958 – October 8, 2024) was an Argentine professional football player and manager. A play-maker midfielder, he spent most of his career in Rosario Central. He was the top scorer of the 1986–87 season with 20 goals in 38 games for Central's championship winning campaign.

== Playing career ==
Palma was born in the city of Campo Largo in the Chaco Province of Argentina. He made his debut with Rosario Central in 1979, he went on to win two titles with the club, the Nacional in 1980 and the 1986–87 championship.

After his goalscoring feats of the 1986–87 season Palma was signed by Argentine giants River Plate, but his two seasons with the club were not particularly successful. Palma did play in both legs of the Copa Interamericana in 1987, which River won 3–0 against Costa Rica's Liga Deportiva Alajuelense in the aggregate. Palma is also remembered in River for scoring the decisive goal in 1987 in a Superclásico where the team came back from a 2–0 deficit.

Palma moved to Mexican club Veracruz in 1989. In May 1990 he scored a spectacular goal in a friendly match against Real Madrid. which Veracruz won 4-2. Palma returned to Rosario Central in 1992, where he won the Copa Conmebol in 1995. Palma finally retired in 1998 at the age of 40 after making 339 league appearances and scoring 61 goals for the club. He played 355 games for them in all competitions scoring 63 goals.

== Managerial career ==
Palma became manager of Rosario Central on March 29, 2011, when the team was competing in the Nacional B, Argentina's second division. He coached Rosario Central for only 11 games, eventually resigning over disagreements with club officials. Palma also coached Rosario's Central Cordoba for the following season.

== Death ==
Palma died from a stroke in Rosario, on October 8, 2024, at the age of 66.

== Honours ==
Rosario Central

- Primera Division Argentina: 1980, 1986–87
- Segunda Division Argentina: 1985
- Copa Conmebol: 1995

River Plate

- Copa Interamericana: 1987

Individual

- Primera División Argentina top scorer: 1986–87
