= 2023 Copa de la Liga Profesional final =

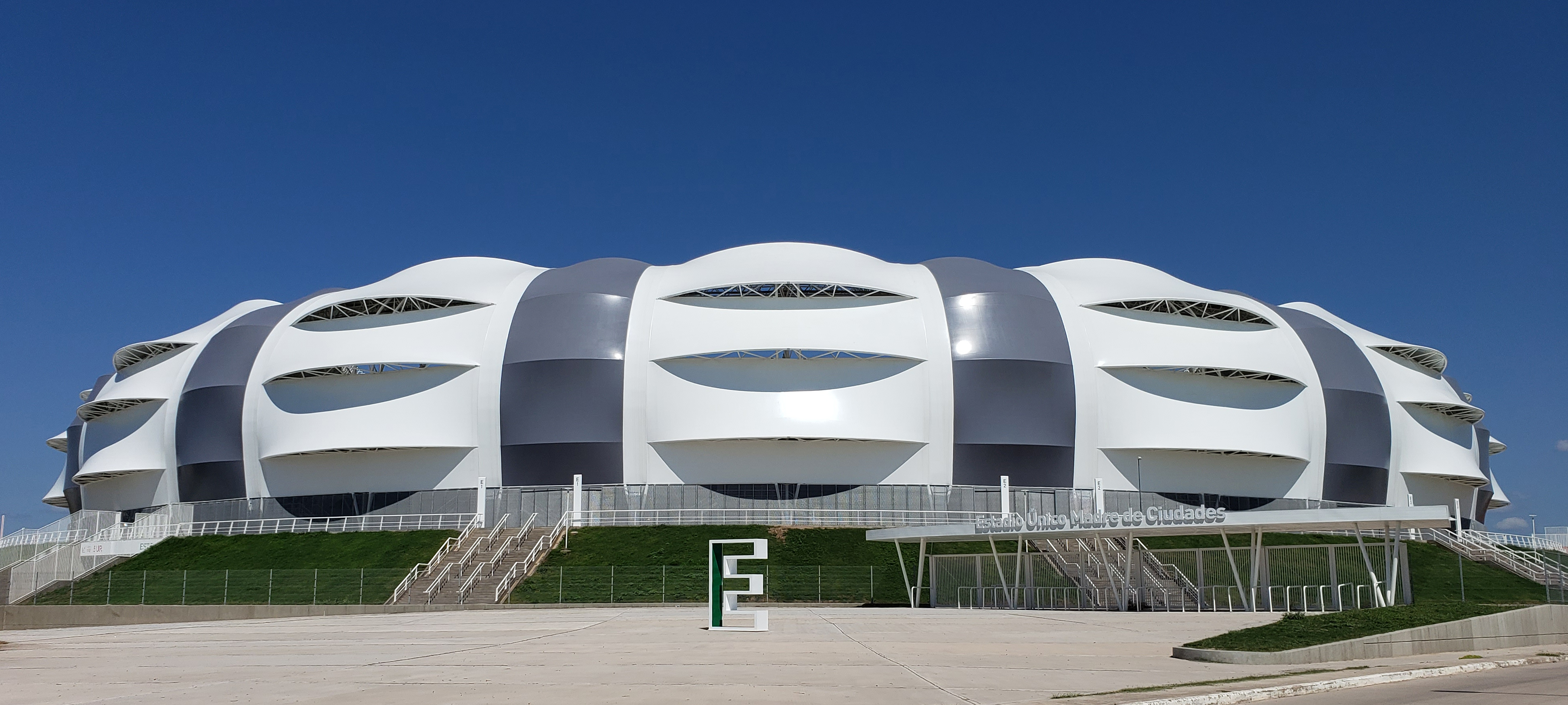
- Estadio Único Madre de Ciudades, venue
- Event: 2023 Copa de la Liga Profesional
Rosario Central	Platense
1	0
- Date: 16 December 2023
- Venue: Estadio Único Madre de Ciudades, Santiago del Estero
- Man of the Match: Maximiliano Lovera (Rosario Central)
- Referee: Nicolás Ramírez

The 2023 Copa de la Liga Profesional final was the final match of the 2023 Copa de la Liga Profesional, the fourth edition of this national cup. It was held in the Estadio Único Madre de Ciudades in Santiago del Estero on 16 December 2023 between Rosario Central and Platense.

Both clubs contested their first Copa de la Liga Profesional final. The last national cup final played by Platense had been the 1943 Copa Adrián Escobar final when the squad lost to Huracán on corner kicks awarded.

Rosario Central won their first title after they defeated Platense 1–0. As champions, Rosario Central qualified for the 2024 Copa Libertadores and the 2023 Trofeo de Campeones.

== Qualified teams ==
Team	Previous finals app.
Rosario Central	(none)
Platense	(none)

Bold indicates winning years

== Road to the final ==
Note: In all results below, the score of the finalist is given first (H: home; A: away; N: neutral venue).

Rosario Central		Round	Platense	
Opponent	Result	Group stage	Opponent	Result
Atlético Tucumán	0–0 (H)	Matchday 1	Boca Juniors	1–3 (A)
Banfield	0–3 (A)	Matchday 2	Defensa y Justicia	0–0 (H)
Talleres (C)	2–0 (H)	Matchday 3	Central Córdoba (SdE)	2–3 (A)
Colón	1–2 (A)	Matchday 4	Lanús	2–1 (H)
Independiente	1–1 (H)	Matchday 5	Belgrano	0–3 (A)
Gimnasia y Esgrima (LP)	1–2 (A)	Matchday 6	Unión	1–0 (H)
Newell's Old Boys	1–0 (H)	Matchday 7	Argentinos Juniors	0–0 (H)
Huracán	1–0 (H)	Matchday 8	Racing	2–1 (A)
Vélez Sarsfield	1–1 (H)	Matchday 9	Estudiantes (LP)	2–1 (H)
Instituto	0–0 (A)	Matchday 10	San Lorenzo	1–1 (A)
Argentinos Juniors	3–1 (H)	Matchday 11	Newell's Old Boys	0–0 (H)
Barracas Central	1–1 (A)	Matchday 12	Godoy Cruz	0–2 (A)
River Plate	3–1 (H)	Matchday 13	Tigre	1–1 (A)
Arsenal	2–1 (A)	Matchday 14	Sarmiento (J)	1–0 (H)
**Zone A 4th place**: Pos / Team / Pld / W / D / L / GF / GA / GD / Pts; 1 / Huracán / 14 / 8 / 2 / 4 / 19 / 11 / +8 / **26**; 2 / River Plate / 14 / 7 / 3 / 4 / 24 / 16 / +8 / **24**; 3 / Banfield / 14 / 6 / 5 / 3 / 11 / 6 / +5 / **23**; **4** / Rosario Central / **14** / **6** / **5** / **3** / **17** / **13** / **+4** / **23**; 5 / Independiente / 14 / 6 / 5 / 3 / 15 / 11 / +4 / **23**; Source: AFA		Final standings	**Zone B 4th place**: Pos / Team / Pld / W / D / L / GF / GA / GD / Pts; 1 / Racing / 14 / 6 / 6 / 2 / 22 / 16 / +6 / **24**; 2 / Godoy Cruz / 14 / 5 / 7 / 2 / 14 / 9 / +5 / **22**; 3 / Belgrano / 14 / 5 / 6 / 3 / 20 / 18 / +2 / **21**; **4** / Platense / **14** / **5** / **5** / **4** / **13** / **16** / **−3** / **20**; 5 / Central Córdoba (SdE) / 14 / 5 / 4 / 5 / 11 / 14 / −3 / **19**; Source: AFA	
Opponent	Result	Final stages	Opponent	Result
Racing	2–2 (7–6 p) (N)	Quarter-finals	Huracán	1–1 (4–2 p) (N)
River Plate	0–0 (2–0 p) (N)	Semi-finals	Godoy Cruz	1–1 (6–5 p) (N)

== Match details ==
16 December 2023
21:00

Rosario Central	1–0	Platense
Lovera 39'	Report

Estadio Único Madre de Ciudades, Santiago del Estero
Referee: Nicolás Ramírez

**Rosario Central**	**Platense**

GK	1	(Argentina) Jorge Broun (c)
RB	4	(Argentina) Damián Martínez		(substituted off) 53'
CB	15	(Uruguay) Facundo Mallo
CB	2	(Argentina) Carlos Quintana
LB	3	(Argentina) Agustín Sández		(substituted off) 81'
DM	45	(Argentina) Kevin Ortiz
DM	30	(Argentina) Tomás O'Connor		(substituted off) 81'
RW	11	(Argentina) Maximiliano Lovera	(yellow card) 19'	(substituted off) 74'
AM	10	(Argentina) Ignacio Malcorra
LW	13	(Colombia) Jaminton Campaz
CF	29	(Mexico) Luca Martínez Dupuy		(substituted off) 81'
Substitutes:
GK	20	(Argentina) Axel Werner
DF	6	(Argentina) Juan Komar		(substituted in) 53'
DF	31	(Argentina) Facundo Agüero
MF	7	(Argentina) Walter Montoya
MF	8	(Argentina) Agustín Toledo		(substituted in) 81'
MF	14	(Colombia) Dannovi Quiñónez
MF	16	(Paraguay) Alan Rodríguez		(substituted in) 81'
MF	18	(Argentina) Francesco Lo Celso
MF	22	(Argentina) Lautaro Giaccone		(substituted in) 74'
MF	23	(Paraguay) Giovanni Bogado
FW	9	(Argentina) Tobías Cervera
FW	24	(Argentina) Octavio Bianchi		(substituted in) 81'
Manager:
(Argentina) Miguel Ángel Russo

GK	12	(Argentina) Ramiro Macagno
RB	4	(Argentina) Nicolás Morgantini
CB	13	(Argentina) Ignacio Vázquez	(yellow card) 14'
CB	6	(Argentina) Gastón Suso (c)	(yellow card) 77' (yellow-red card) 88'
LB	2	(Argentina) Raúl Lozano
RM	19	(Argentina) Facundo Russo		(substituted off) 67'
CM	8	(Argentina) Franco Díaz
CM	11	(Argentina) Nicolás Castro	(yellow card) 44'	(substituted off) 74'
LM	10	(Uruguay) Agustín Ocampo	(yellow card) 90+6'
CF	7	(Argentina) Mateo Pellegrino		(substituted off) 50'
CF	77	(Paraguay) Ronaldo Martínez	(yellow card) 59'	(substituted off) 67'
Substitutes:
GK	23	(Argentina) Joaquín Blázquez
DF	3	(Argentina) Juan Infante
DF	18	(Argentina) Sasha Marcich
DF	24	(Argentina) Juan Pablo Pignani
DF	27	(Paraguay) Miguel Jacquet
MF	14	(Argentina) Leonel Picco		(substituted in) 67'
MF	21	(Argentina) Ciro Rius
MF	32	(Argentina) Luciano Ferreyra		(substituted in) 74'
MF	33	(Argentina) Jerónimo Cacciabue
FW	20	(Argentina) Nicolás Servetto		(substituted in) 50'
FW	35	(Argentina) Manuel Tucker
FW	43	(Argentina) Maximiliano Zalazar		(substituted in) 67'
Manager:
(Argentina) Martín Palermo

Man of the Match:
Maximiliano Lovera (Rosario Central)
Assistant referees:
Juan Pablo Belatti
Sebastián Raineri
Fourth official:
Rodrigo Rivero
Fifth official:
Federico Cano
Video assistant referee:
Mauro Vigliano
Assistant video assistant referees:
Jorge Baliño

**Match rules**

- 90 minutes
- 30 minutes of extra time if necessary
- Penalty shoot-out if scores still level
- Twelve named substitutes
- Maximum of five substitutions, with a sixth allowed in extra time

=== Statistics ===
Overall
Statistic	Rosario Central	Platense
Goals scored	1	0
Total shots	15	16
Shots on target	9	10
Ball possession	51%	49%
Corner kicks	5	8
Fouls committed	5	14
Offsides	1	1
Yellow cards	1	6
Red cards	0	1
