= 2023 Trofeo de Campeones de la Liga Profesional =

- Promotional poster of the final
- Event: Trofeo de Campeones (LPF)
Rosario Central	River Plate
0	2
- Date: 22 December 2023
- Venue: Estadio Único Madre de Ciudades, Santiago del Estero
- Referee: Facundo Tello
- Attendance: 30,000

The 2023 Trofeo de Campeones de la Liga Profesional was a football match between the winners of the Copa de la Liga Profesional and Argentine Primera División. The match was contested by the 2023 Copa de la Liga Profesional champions Rosario Central and the 2023 Primera División winners River Plate on 22 December 2023 at the Estadio Único Madre de Ciudades, Santiago del Estero. Rosario Central were making their first appearance, while River Plate were appearing for a second time after winning the 2021 edition.

River Plate qualified as a result of winning the Primera División, finishing eleven points ahead of the second-placed team. Rosario Central entered the competition after winning the Copa de la Liga Profesional final against Platense 1–0.

Watched by a crowd of 30,000, Facundo Colidio opened the scoring for River Plate nearing the end of the first half. They extended their lead in the 75th minute courtesy of subbed-in midfielder Ignacio Fernández. No further goals were scored, and River Plate secured their second Trofeo de Campeones title.

== Background ==
Founded in 2020, the Trofeo de Campeones de la Liga Profesional was contested between the Primera División champions and the Copa de la Liga Profesional winners. It functioned as a super cup, pairing the two domestic champions of the Argentine football season organised by the Liga Profesional. However, in 2025 the Argentine Football Association changed the format for its upcoming season, causing both the Copa de la Liga and Liga Profesional to come to an end. Since then, the Trofeo de Campeones is contested by the Torneo Apertura and the Torneo Clausura winners.

River Plate entered the tournament by winning the Primera División, in which they finished eleven points clear of second-placed team Talleres (C). They were appearing in the Trofeo de Campeones for a second time, after beating Colón 4–0 in the 2021 edition. In turn, it was Rosario Central's first appearance. They were the holders of the Copa de la Liga Profesional, having won the final match of the tournament 1–0 against Platense, therefore ensuring their right to participate in the match.

The teams had played three games against each other during the 2023 season. The first two were held at Rosario Central's home ground of Estadio Gigante de Arroyito, and resulted in a 3–3 draw in the Primera División fixture, and a 3–1 win for the home side in the league cup. They were then paired in the semi-finals of the latter competition, where Rosario Central beat River Plate on penalties following a goalless draw. As a result, the Trofeo de Campeones match was to be their fourth meeting of the season.

== Match ==
=== Summary ===
==== First half ====
From the start of the match, River Plate controlled possession, while Rosario Central fell back on defense, adopting a defensive approach. The first chance of the game occurred early in the third minute, when a cross from River Plate left-back Enzo Díaz took a deflection, being subsequently volleyed just wide of the net by Claudio Echeverri. They had a follow up opportunity three minutes later, when the attacking midfielder filtered a pass to Facundo Colidio, who unleashed a shot on target that was saved by goalkeeper Jorge Broun. In the ninth minute, Echeverri was fouled, as he continued to be a nuisance. The resulting free kick was taken by Uruguayan midfielder Nicolás de la Cruz, whose set piece met the crossbar. Shortly after, Pablo Solari had another chance to open the scoring, sending his effort wide, before De la Cruz forced Broun into another save with a header. Close to the midway point, Echeverri attempted to open the scoring through a long-range shot, but the goalkeeper once again denied their side. In the 26th, Solari had two prospects within a minute, the second of which struck the right post following a one-on-one situation. Two minutes later, Esequiel Barco would also try his luck from distance, but Broun got ahold of his effort. Nearing the half-hour mark, River Plate centre-back Paulo Díaz was booked after tackling Jaminton Campaz. It was the Rosario Central forward who later had his team's first chance, although shooting into goalkeeper Franco Armani. Right afterward, Campaz received a yellow card, stemming from a foul on Sebastián Boselli. River Plate kept dominating the match, but their opposition managed to funnel danger through quick transitions into counter-attacks. At the 37-minute mark, striker Luca Martínez Dupuy entered the box from the right side and took a shot to force Armani into a save. Despite Rosario Central having two consecutive chances, River Plate would ultimately manage to find the opening, following a counter-attack of their own. The play started when Barco recovered ball possession and led the offense before passing to Solari. The winger then crossed for Colidio, who tapped the delivery in while unmarked in the 41st minute. In response, Rosario Central had two corner kicks to level the game, but the score remained for half-time.

==== Second half ====
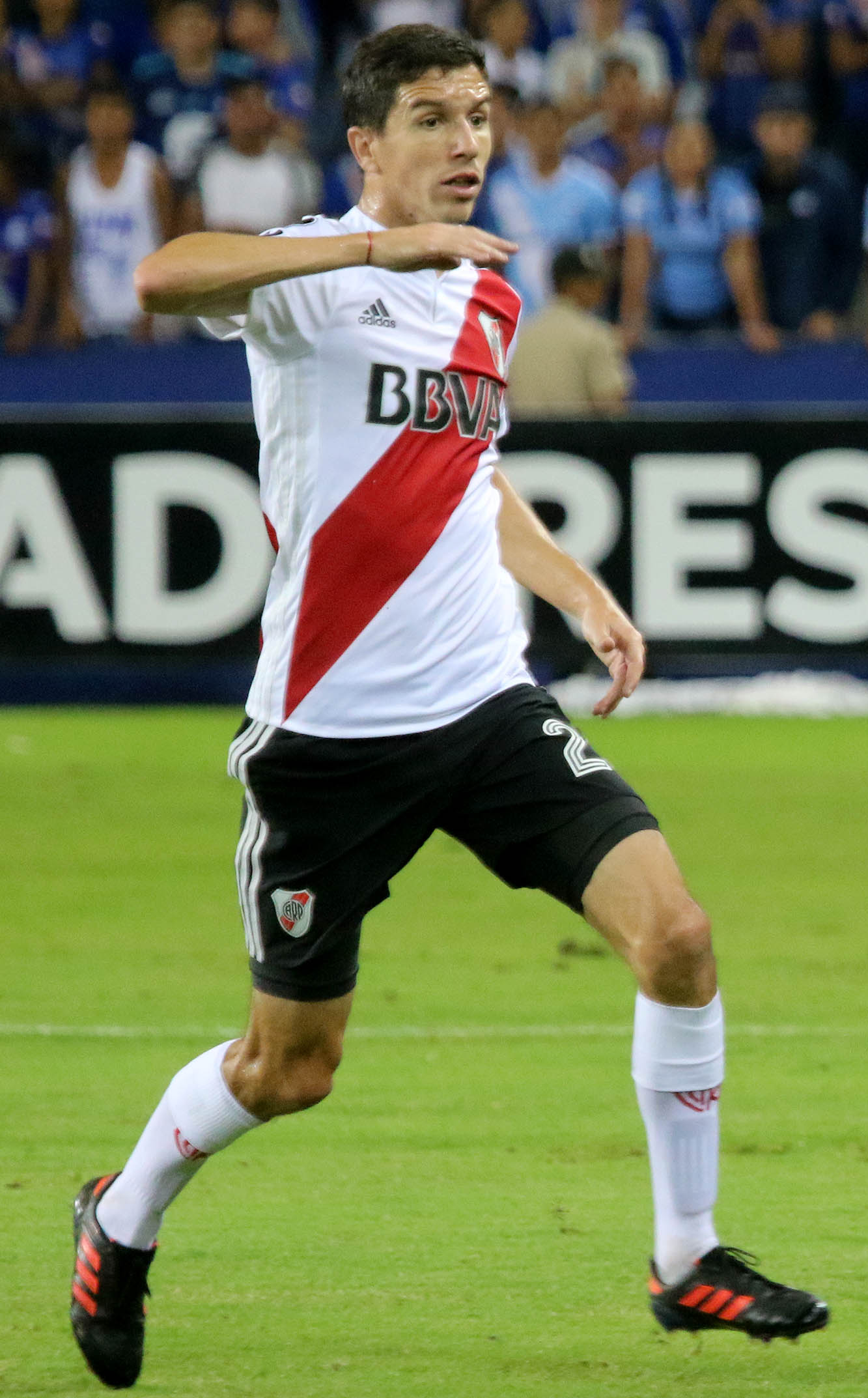
Ignacio Fernández, who scored the second goal of the match.

During the interval, Rosario Central manager Miguel Ángel Russo subbed Tomás O'Connor in for fellow midfielder Agustín Toledo. They had a chance to equalise early after the restart, after Ignacio Malcorra passed over to Martínez Dupuy, who was unable to swing it for the net. River Plate replied through Boselli and De la Cruz from afar, but Broun fended off both efforts. In the 59th minute, Campaz committed a hard tackle on the Uruguayan midfielder, prompting referee Facundo Tello to send him off due to an accumulation of cards. Shortly after, River Plate made three substitutions in four minutes. Coach Martín Demichelis first replaced Echeverri and Solari for Ignacio Fernández and Miguel Borja. He was then forced into switching Ramiro Funes Mori, who sustained a knee injury, for fellow centre-back Leandro González Pírez. In between changes, Borja nearly scored after De la Cruz laid the ball off for him to shoot on target. Rosario Central responded through Agustín Sández, who came close to equalising in the 67th minute following an effort that went high of the bar. Three minutes later, Carlos Quintana was booked for their side as a result of arguing with referee Tello. River Plate continued to have chances to extend their lead, remaining unsuccessful until the 75th minute. Immediately after two new changes from Rosario Central, Barco assisted Fernández from the left, who scored their second goal with a shot across the net. River Plate made their last two substitutions around the 83-minute mark, and had an opportunity to add one further, but a De la Cruz effort was stopped by Broun. Five minutes from injury time, Rosario Central managed to pull one back, but it was disallowed after the video assistant referee credited an offside by goalscorer Octavio Bianchi. The match would eventually end with a 2–0 scoreline in favour of River Plate, who consequently won their second Trofeo de Campeones title.

=== Details ===
22 December 2023
21:00 UTC−3

Rosario Central	0–2	River Plate
	Report	Colidio 40'; Fernández 75'

Estadio Único Madre de Ciudades, Santiago del Estero
Attendance: 30,000
Referee: Facundo Tello

Rosario Central	River Plate

GK	1	(Argentina) Jorge Broun (c)
RB	6	(Argentina) Juan Komar
CB	15	(Uruguay) Facundo Mallo	(yellow card) 90+4'
CB	2	(Argentina) Carlos Quintana	(yellow card) 70'
LB	3	(Argentina) Agustín Sández
CM	45	(Argentina) Kevin Ortiz
CM	8	(Argentina) Agustín Toledo		(substituted off) 46'
RW	11	(Argentina) Maximiliano Lovera		(substituted off) 74'
AM	10	(Argentina) Ignacio Malcorra
LW	13	(Colombia) Jaminton Campaz	(yellow card) 32' (yellow-red card) 59'
CF	29	(Mexico) Luca Martínez Dupuy		(substituted off) 74'
Substitutes:
GK	20	(Argentina) Axel Werner
DF	16	(Paraguay) Alan Rodríguez
DF	31	(Argentina) Facundo Agüero
MF	7	(Argentina) Walter Montoya
MF	18	(Argentina) Francesco Lo Celso
MF	22	(Argentina) Lautaro Giaccone		(substituted on) 74'
MF	23	(Paraguay) Giovanni Bogado
MF	30	(Argentina) Tomás O'Connor		(substituted on) 46'
MF	44	(Italy) Agustín Módica
FW	9	(Argentina) Tobías Cervera
FW	24	(Argentina) Octavio Bianchi		(substituted on) 74'
FW	39	(Argentina) Fabricio Oviedo
Manager:
(Argentina) Miguel Ángel Russo

GK	1	(Argentina) Franco Armani
RB	2	(Uruguay) Sebastián Boselli
CB	17	(Chile) Paulo Díaz	(yellow card) 28'	(substituted off) 84'
CB	3	(Argentina) Ramiro Funes Mori		(substituted off) 65'
LB	13	(Argentina) Enzo Díaz
CM	24	(Argentina) Enzo Pérez (c)		(substituted off) 83'
CM	11	(Uruguay) Nicolás de la Cruz
RW	36	(Argentina) Pablo Solari		(substituted off) 60'
AM	19	(Argentina) Claudio Echeverri		(substituted off) 61'
LW	21	(Argentina) Esequiel Barco
CF	16	(Argentina) Facundo Colidio
Substitutes:
GK	33	(Argentina) Ezequiel Centurión
DF	4	(Argentina) Jonatan Maidana		(substituted on) 83'
DF	14	(Argentina) Leandro González Pírez		(substituted on) 65'
MF	8	(Argentina) Agustín Palavecino
MF	10	(Argentina) Manuel Lanzini		(substituted on) 84'
MF	18	(Argentina) Gonzalo Martínez
MF	22	(Argentina) Matías Kranevitter
MF	26	(Argentina) Ignacio Fernández		(substituted on) 61'
MF	29	(Argentina) Rodrigo Aliendro
MF	31	(Argentina) Santiago Simón
FW	7	(Argentina) Matías Suárez
FW	9	(Colombia) Miguel Borja		(substituted on) 60'
Manager:
(Argentina) Martín Demichelis

Assistant referees
Diego Bonfá
Gabriel Chade
Fourth official
Pablo Echavarría
Fifth official
Francisco Acosta
Video assistant referee
Héctor Paletta
Assistant video assistant referees
Lucas Novelli

Match rules

- 90 minutes
- 30 minutes of extra time if necessary
- Penalty shoot-out if scores still level
- Twelve named substitutes
- Maximum of five substitutions, with a sixth allowed in extra time

=== Statistics ===
Overall
Statistic	Rosario Central	River Plate
Goals scored	0	2
Total shots	11	27
Shots on target	6	15
Ball possession	38%	62%
Corner kicks	3	10
Fouls committed	13	14
Offsides	1	1
Yellow cards	4	1
Red cards	1	0
