= 2025 Rosario Central season =

Rosario Central
2025 season
- President: Gonzalo Belloso
- Manager: Ariel Holan
- Stadium: Estadio Gigante de Arroyito
- Liga: Champions
- Torneo Apertura: Quarter-finals
- Torneo Clausura: Round of 16
- Copa Argentina: Round of 32
- Average home league attendance: 46,755
Home colours	Away colours

The 2025 season was the 136th for Club Atlético Rosario Central and their 11th consecutive season in the Primera División. The club also took part in the Copa Argentina.

On 20 November 2025, the AFA awarded Rosario Central the official title of "Campeón de Liga" for having earned the most points in the aggregate table.

== Squad ==
=== Current squad ===
As of 3 February 2025.

Note: Flags indicate national team as defined under FIFA eligibility rules; some limited exceptions apply. Players may hold more than one non-FIFA nationality.

No.	Pos.	Nation	Player
1	GK	ARG	Jorge Broun
2	DF	ARG	Carlos Quintana
3	DF	PAR	Agustín Sández
5	MF	ARG	Franco Ibarra
6	DF	ARG	Juan Komar
7	FW	ARG	Maximiliano Lovera
8	MF	ARG	Jonathan Gómez
9	FW	ARG	Enzo Copetti
10	MF	ARG	Víctor Malcorra
11	FW	PAR	Sebastián Ferreira
15	DF	URU	Facundo Mallo
16	MF	PAR	Enzo Giménez
19	DF	ARG	Agustín Bravo

No.	Pos.	Nation	Player
20	GK	ARG	Axel Werner (on loan from Elche)
21	FW	ARG	Santi López (on loan from Independiente)
22	MF	ARG	Lautaro Giaccone
23	MF	ARG	Augusto Solari
24	DF	ARG	Juan Giménez
27	MF	ARG	Gaspar Duarte
30	MF	ARG	Tomás O'Connor
32	DF	ARG	Emanuel Coronel
33	DF	ARG	Juan Elordi
37	DF	ARG	Elías Ocampo
44	FW	ITA	Agustín Módica
45	MF	ARG	Kevin Ortiz (captain)
99	MF	COL	Jaminton Campaz

=== Transfers In ===
Pos.	Player	Transferred from	Fee	Date	Source
MF	(Argentina) Franco Ibarra	(United States) Atlanta United	Free	20 January 2025	
MF	(Argentina) Ángel Di María	(Portugal) Benfica	Free	29 May 2025	
GK	(Argentina) Axel Werner	(Spain) Elche	Free	1 July 2025	
FW	(Argentina) Alejo Véliz	(England) Tottenham Hotspur	Loan	8 July 2025	

=== Transfers Out ===
Pos.	Player	Transferred to	Fee	Date	Source
FW	(Mexico) Luca Martínez	(Argentina) Godoy Cruz	Undisclosed	2 February 2025	
MF	(Argentina) Kevin Ortiz	(Argentina) Atlético Tucumán	Loan	25 June 2025	
FW	(Syria) Tobías Cervera	(Argentina) Aldosivi	Loan	23 July 2025	
MF	(Argentina) Jonathan Gómez	(Argentina) Sarmiento	Free	30 June 2025	
MF	(Argentina) Lautaro Giaccone	(Argentina) Argentinos Juniors	$1,000,000	3 July 2025	

== Competitions ==
=== Overall record ===
Competition	First match	Last match	Starting round	Final position	Record							
Competition	First match	Last match	Starting round	Final position	Pld	W	D	L	GF	GA	GD	Win %
Torneo Apertura	23 January 2025	18 May 2025	Matchday 1	Quarter-finals	18	11	5	2	24	9	+15	61.11
Torneo Clausura	12 July 2025	23 November 2025	Matchday 1	Round of 16	17	8	7	2	18	9	+9	47.06
Copa Argentina	9 April 2025	28 June 2025	Round of 64	Round of 32	2	1	1	0	1	0	+1	50.00
Total					37	20	13	4	43	18	+25	54.05

Source: Competitions

=== Primera División ===
==== Torneo Apertura ====
===== League table =====
Pos	Team	Pld	W	D	L	GF	GA	GD	Pts	Qualification
1	Rosario Central	16	10	5	1	22	8	+14	35	Advance to round of 16
2	River Plate	16	8	7	1	21	9	+12	31	Advance to round of 16
3	Independiente	16	8	5	3	23	12	+11	29	Advance to round of 16
4	San Lorenzo	16	7	6	3	14	10	+4	27	Advance to round of 16
5	Deportivo Riestra	16	5	9	2	13	7	+6	24	Advance to round of 16

Source: AFA

===== Results by round =====
Round	1	2	3	4	5	6	7	8	9	10	11	12	13	14	15
Ground	A	H	A	H	A	A	H	A	A	H	A	H	A	H	A
Result	W	W	D	W	D	W	W	L	D	W	D	W			
Position															

A = Away; H = Home; W = Win; D = Draw; L = Loss

===== Matches =====
23 January 2025 1	Godoy Cruz	0–3	Rosario Central	Mendoza
19:00 UTC−3		Report	Copetti 18'; Malcorra 26'; Campaz 48'	Stadium: Estadio Víctor Legrotaglie

28 January 2025 2	Rosario Central	2–1	Lanús	Rosario
19:15 UTC−3	Campaz 10'; Malcorra 38', pen'	Report	Bou 84'	Stadium: Estadio Gigante de Arroyito; Referee: Luis Lobo Medina

1 February 2025 3	San Martín	0–0	Rosario Central	San Juan
19:00 UTC−3		Report		Stadium: Estadio Ingeniero Hilario Sánchez

8 February 2025 4	Rosario Central	3–1	Atlético Tucumán	Rosario
19:30 UTC−3	Malcorra 36' (pen.); Campaz 53'; Giaccone 61'	Report	Broun 49' (o.g.)	Stadium: Estadio Gigante de Arroyito

12 February 2025 5	Deportivo Riestra	0–0	Rosario Central	Buenos Aires
16:00 UTC−3		Report		Stadium: Estadio Guillermo Laza

16 February 2025 6	Newell's Old Boys	1–2	Rosario Central	Rosario
17:00 UTC−3	Éver Banega 87'		Duarte 16'; Campaz 63'	Stadium: Estadio Marcelo Bielsa

22 February 2025 7	Rosario Central	1–0	Sarmiento	Rosario
21:45 UTC−3	Sández 6'	Report		Stadium: Estadio Gigante de Arroyito

28 February 2025 8	Boca Juniors	1–0	Rosario Central	Buenos Aires
20:00 UTC−3	Giménez 8'	Report		Stadium: La Bombonera; Referee: Hernán Mastrángelo

10 March 2025 9	Talleres de Córdoba	0–0	Rosario Central	Córdoba
21:15 UTC−3		Report		Stadium: Estadio Mario Alberto Kempes

15 March 2025 10	Rosario Central	2–1	Gimnasia	Rosario
18:30 UTC−3	Malcorra 33' (pen.); Ferreira 54'	Report	Castillo 38'	Stadium: Estadio Gigante de Arroyito

29 March 2025 11	River Plate	2–2	Rosario Central	Buenos Aires
21:00 UTC−3	Martínez 18'; Subiabre 61'	Report	Ferreira 8'; López 85'	Stadium: Estadio Mâs Monumental

5 April 2025 12	Rosario Central	2–1	Vélez Sarsfield	Rosario
15:30 UTC−3	Sández 58'; Giménez 90+1'	Report	Romero 10'	Stadium: Estadio Gigante de Arroyito

15 April 2025 13	Platense	0–0	Rosario Central	Florida
20:00 UTC−3		Report		Stadium: Estadio Ciudad de Vicente López

20 April 2025 14	Rosario Central	3–0	Instituto	Rosario
20:30 UTC−3	López 8': Duarte 68'; Copetti 90+4'	Report		Stadium: Estadio Gigante de Arroyito

26 April 2025 15	San Lorenzo	0–1	Rosario Central	Buenos Aires
17:00 UTC−3		Report	Copetti 90+1'	Stadium: Estadio Pedro Bidegain

3 May 2025 16	Rosario Central	1–0	Independiente	Rosario
18:30 UTC−3	Spörle 20' (o.g.)	Report		Stadium: Estadio Gigante de Arroyito

===== Final stages =====
10 May 2025 Round of 16	Rosario Central	2–0	Estudiantes	Rosario
16:30	Quintana 87'; Campaz 90+5'	Report		Stadium: Gigante de Arroyito; Referee: Andrés Merlos

18 May 2025 Quarter-finals	Rosario Central	0–1	Huracán	Rosario
19:00		Report	Mazzantti 20'	Stadium: Gigante de Arroyito; Referee: Pablo Echavarría

==== Torneo Clausura ====
===== League table =====
Pos	Team	Pld	W	D	L	GF	GA	GD	Pts	Qualification
1	Rosario Central	16	8	7	1	18	8	+10	31	Advance to round of 16
2	Lanús	16	9	3	4	20	13	+7	30	Advance to round of 16
3	Deportivo Riestra	16	8	4	4	19	12	+7	28	Advance to round of 16
4	Vélez Sarsfield	16	7	5	4	19	12	+7	26	Advance to round of 16
5	San Lorenzo	16	6	6	4	13	11	+2	24	Advance to round of 16

Source: AFA

===== Matches =====
12 July 2025 1	Rosario Central	1–1	Godoy Cruz	Rosario
16:00 UTC−3	Di María 78' (pen.)	Report	Poggi 90+5'	Stadium: Estadio Gigante de Arroyito

19 July 2025 2	Lanús	0–1	Rosario Central	Lanús
16:30 UTC−3		Report	Di María 74' (pen.)	Stadium: Estadio Ciudad de Lanús

26 July 2025 3	Rosario Central	0–0	San Martín	Rosario
17:00 UTC−3		Report		Stadium: Estadio Gigante de Arroyito

9 August 2025 4	Atlético Tucumán	0–0	Rosario Central	Tucumán
20:45 UTC−3		Report		Stadium: Estadio Monumental José Fierro

16 August 2025 5	Rosario Central	1–1	Deportivo Riestra	Rosario
18:30 UTC−3	Véliz 9'	Report	Herrera 89' (pen.)	Stadium: Estadio Gigante de Arroyito

23 August 2025 6	Rosario Central	1–0	Newell's Old Boys	Rosario
17:30 UTC−3	Di María 82'	Report		Stadium: Estadio Gigante de Arroyito

14 September 2025 8	Rosario Central	1–1	Boca Juniors	Rosario
17:30 UTC−3	Di María 24'	Report	Battaglia 20'	Stadium: Estadio Gigante de Arroyito; Referee: Facundo Tello

21 September 2025 9	Rosario Central	1–1	Talleres	Rosario
19:00 UTC−3	Véliz 44'	Report	Depietri 48'	Stadium: Estadio Gigante de Arroyito

27 September 2025 10	Gimnasia y Esgrima	0–3	Rosario Central	La Plata
14:30 UTC−3		Report	Véliz 2'; Giménez 83'; Di María 86'	Stadium: Estadio Juan Carmelo Zerillo

5 October 2025 11	Rosario Central	2–1	River Plate	Rosario
21:15 UTC−3	Ibarra 21'; Malcorra 59'	Report	Borja 10'	Stadium: Estadio Gigante de Arroyito; Referee: Yael Falcón Pérez

11 October 2025 12	Vélez Sarsfield	1–2	Rosario Central	Buenos Aires
21:15 UTC−3	Lanzini 51'	Report	Véliz 17'; Malcorra 90+7' (pen.)	Stadium: José Amalfitani Stadium

19 October 2025 13	Rosario Central	1–0	Platense	Rosario
19:00 UTC−3	Véliz 51'	Report		Stadium: Estadio Gigante de Arroyito

24 October 2025 7	Sarmiento	0–1	Rosario Central	Junín
16:00 UTC−3		Report	Di María 90+2' (pen.)	Stadium: Estadio Eva Perón

31 October 2025 14	Instituto	1–3	Rosario Central	Córdoba
21:15 UTC−3	Córdoba 36'	Report	Malcorra 38'; Di María 64' (pen.); Ovando 67'	Stadium: Estadio Monumental Presidente Perón

7 November 2025 15	Rosario Central	0–0	San Lorenzo	Rosario
21:00 UTC−3		Report		Stadium: Estadio Gigante de Arroyito; Referee: Facundo Tello

15 November 2025 16	Independiente	1–0	Rosario Central	Avellaneda
21:30 UTC−3	Ávalos 28'	Report		Stadium: Estadio Libertadores de América

===== Final stages =====
23 November 2025 Round of 16	Rosario Central	0–1	Estudiantes	Rosario
17:30		Report	Cetré 30'	Stadium: Gigante de Arroyito; Referee: Pablo Dóvalo

==== League Championship ====
On 20 November 2025, the AFA awarded Rosario Central the official title of "Campeón de Liga" (League Championship) for having earned the most points in the aggregate table.

===== Aggregate table =====
Pos	Team	Pld	W	D	L	GF	GA	GD	Pts	Qualification or relegation
1	Rosario Central (C)	32	18	12	2	40	16	+24	66	Qualification for Copa Libertadores group stage
2	Boca Juniors	32	18	8	6	52	23	+29	62	Qualification for Copa Libertadores group stage
3	Argentinos Juniors	32	16	9	7	42	22	+20	57	Qualification for Copa Libertadores second stage
4	River Plate	32	14	11	7	41	24	+17	53	Qualification for Copa Sudamericana group stage
5	Racing	32	16	5	11	42	29	+13	53	Qualification for Copa Sudamericana group stage

Source: AFA
Rules for classification: 1) points; 2) goal difference; 3) goals scored; 4) head-to-head results 5) fair play ranking 6) drawing of lots.
(C) Champions

=== Copa Argentina ===
9 April 2025 Round of 64	Rosario Central	1–0	Los Andes	San Nicolás de los Arroyos
16:00	Giaccone 70'	Report		Stadium: Único de San Nicolás; Referee: Pablo Dóvalo

28 June 2025 Round of 32	Rosario Central	0–0 (1–3 p)	Unión	San Nicolás de los Arroyos
13:00		Report		Stadium: Único de San Nicolás; Referee: Darío Herrera
	Penalties
	Malcorra (penalty scored); Módica (penalty missed); Duarte (penalty missed); Sández (penalty missed)		(penalty scored) Martínez; (penalty scored) Pittón; (penalty missed) Estigarribia; (penalty scored) Verde
