= 2026 Rosario Central season =

Rosario Central
2026 season
- Manager: Jorge Almirón
- Stadium: Estadio Gigante de Arroyito
- AFA Liga Profesional de Fútbol Torneo Apertura: 4th Semi-finals
- AFA Liga Profesional de Fútbol Torneo Clausura: 3rd
- Copa Argentina: Round of 32
- Copa Libertadores: Round of 16
- Top goalscorer: League: Enzo Copetti; Ángel Di María (5); All: Enzo Copetti; Ángel Di María (7)

The 2026 season is the 136th year in the history of Club Atlético Rosario Central and the 13th consecutive year in the top division. It also competes in the Copa Argentina, Copa Libertadores, and Copa Santa Fe.

== Transfers ==
=== In ===
Pos.	Player	Transferred from	Fee	Date	Source
DF	(Chile) Vicente Pizarro	(Chile) Colo-Colo	Undisclosed	8 January 2026	
GK	(Argentina) Jeremias Ledesma	(Argentina) River Plate	Loan	9 January 2026	
DF	(Argentina) Alexis Soto	(Argentina) Defensa y Justicia	Loan	19 January 2026	
MF	(Argentina) Pol Fernández	(Argentina) Godoy Cruz	Free	26 January 2026	
MF	(Argentina) Julián Fernández	(United States) New York City FC	Loan	27 January 2026	
DF	(Paraguay) Sebastián Zaracho	(Paraguay) Guaraní	Free	9 June 2026	
GK	(Argentina) Axel Werner	(Spain) Elche	Loan	12 July 2026	
FW	(Argentina) Tomás Badaloni	(Mexico) Necaxa	Undisclosed	14 July 2026	
MF	(Argentina) Franco Cervi	Unattached	Free	18 July 2026	
MF	(Uruguay) Alan Rodríguez	(Brazil) Internacional	Loan	5 August 2026	

=== Out ===
Pos.	Player	Transferred to	Fee	Date	Source
DF	(Argentina) Juan Manuel Elordi	(Argentina) Racing Club	Loan return	31 December 2025	
MF	(Argentina) Santiago López	(Argentina) Independiente	Loan return	31 December 2025	
MF	(Argentina) Víctor Malcorra	(Argentina) Independiente	Free	5 January 2026	
GK	(Argentina) Axel Werner	(Spain) Elche	Loan return	16 January 2026	
FW	(Italy) Agustín Módica	(Argentina) Gimnasia y Esgrima de Mendoza	Undisclosed	31 January 2026	
MF	(Argentina) Tomás O'Connor	(Argentina) Gimnasia y Esgrima de Mendoza	Loan	31 January 2026	
FW	(Argentina) Maximiliano Lovera	(Colombia) Independiente Santa Fe	Loan	24 February 2026	
MF	(Argentina) Francesco Lo Celso	(Argentina) Estudiantes de Río Cuarto	Free	23 March 2026	
FW	(Argentina) Alejo Véliz	(England) Tottenham Hotspur	Loan return	30 June 2026	
MF	(Paraguay) Enzo Giménez	(Mexico) Querétaro	Undisclosed	11 July 2026	
GK	(Argentina) Jorge Broun	(Chile) Universidad de Concepción	Free	21 July 2026	

== Competitions ==
=== Overall record ===
Competition	First match	Last match	Starting round	Final position	Record							
Competition	First match	Last match	Starting round	Final position	Pld	W	D	L	GF	GA	GD	Win %
Primera División Apertura regular season	24 January 2026	3 May 2026	Matchday 1	4th	16	8	4	4	20	16	+4	50.00
Primera División Apertura play-offs	10 May 2026	13 May 2026	Round of 16	Semi-finals	3	2	0	1	5	3	+2	66.67
Primera División Clausura regular season	23 July 2026		Matchday 1		4	2	1	1	4	3	+1	50.00
Copa Argentina	11 February 2026	31 May 2026	Round of 64	Round of 32	2	1	0	1	2	3	−1	50.00
Copa Libertadores	9 April 2026		Group stage		6	4	1	1	9	1	+8	66.67
Total					31	17	6	8	40	26	+14	54.84

Source: Competitions

=== Primera División ===
==== Torneo Apertura ====
Zone B

Pos	Team	Pld	W	D	L	GF	GA	GD	Pts	Qualification
2	River Plate	16	9	2	5	22	12	+10	29	Advance to round of 16
3	Argentinos Juniors	16	8	5	3	17	13	+4	29	Advance to round of 16
4	Rosario Central	16	8	4	4	20	16	+4	28	Advance to round of 16
5	Belgrano	16	7	5	4	17	13	+4	26	Advance to round of 16
6	Gimnasia y Esgrima (LP)	16	8	2	6	19	19	0	26	Advance to round of 16

Source: AFA

24 January 2026 1	Rosario Central	1–2	Belgrano
22:00

28 January 2026 2	Racing	1–2	Rosario Central
19:00

1 February 2026 3	Rosario Central	0–0	River Plate
21:30

7 February 2026 4	Aldosivi	1–1	Rosario Central
17:00

15 February 2026 5	Rosario Central	2–0	Barracas
22:00

20 February 2026 6	Rosario Central	0–1	Talleres
22:15

25 February 2026 7	Gimnasia y Esgrima	1–2	Rosario Central
17:00

1 March 2026 8	Newell's Old Boys	0–2	Rosario Central
17:00

11 March 2026 10	Argentinos Juniors	0–0	Rosario Central
17:30

15 March 2026 11	Rosario Central	2–1	Banfield
21:00

22 March 2026 12	Independiente Rivadavia	2–0	Rosario Central
22:15

4 April 2026 13	Rosario Central	2–1	Atlético Tucumán
21:00

12 April 2026 14	Huracán	3–1	Rosario Central
17:30

19 April 2026 15	Rosario Central	2–1	Sarmiento
20:30

24 April 2026 16	Estudiantes de Río Cuarto	1–2	Rosario Central
19:15

3 May 2026 9	Rosario Central	1–1	Tigre
16:00

===== Play-offs =====
10 May 2026 Round of 16	Rosario Central	3–1	Independiente
15:00

13 May 2026 Quarter-finals	Rosario Central	2–1 (a.e.t.)	Racing Club
18:45

16 May 2026 Semi-finals	River Plate	1–0	Rosario Central
19:30

==== Torneo Clausura ====
Zone B

Pos	Team	Pld	W	D	L	GF	GA	GD	Pts	Qualification
1	Argentinos Juniors	5	4	0	1	9	5	+4	12	Advance to round of 16
2	Belgrano	5	3	1	1	6	2	+4	10	Advance to round of 16
3	Rosario Central	5	3	1	1	5	3	+2	10	Advance to round of 16
4	Sarmiento (J)	5	3	0	2	10	8	+2	9	Advance to round of 16
5	Barracas Central	5	3	0	2	3	3	0	9	Advance to round of 16

Updated to match(es) played on 17 August 2026. Source: AFA

23 July 2026 1	Belgrano	2–1	Rosario Central
19:30

28 July 2026 2	Rosario Central	0–0	Racing
21:15

2 August 2026 3	River Plate	0–1	Rosario Central
19:15

7 August 2026 4	Rosario Central	2–1	Aldosivi
19:30	Zalazar 61' (o.g.); Campaz 80'		Sosa 52'

=== Copa Argentina ===
11 February 2026 Round of 64	Rosario Central	2–0	Sportivo Belgrano
19:00

31 May 2026 Round of 32	Estudiantes	3–0	Rosario Central
15:30

=== Copa Libertadores ===
==== Group stage ====
Group H

Pos	Team	Pld	W	D	L	GF	GA	GD	Pts	Qualification
1	(Ecuador) Independiente del Valle	6	4	1	1	11	6	+5	13 (Note: Head-to-head points: Independiente del Valle 4, Rosario Central 1.)	Advance to round of 16
2	(Argentina) Rosario Central	6	4	1	1	9	1	+8	13	Advance to round of 16
3	(Venezuela) Universidad Central	6	3	0	3	7	11	−4	9	Transfer to Copa Sudamericana
4	(Paraguay) Libertad	6	0	0	6	4	13	−9	0	

Source: CONMEBOL
Rules for classification: 1) Points; 2) Head-to-head points; 3) Head-to-head goal difference; 4) Head-to-head goals scored; 5) Goal difference; 6) Goals scored; 7) Red cards; 8) Yellow cards; 9) Drawing of lots.
Notes:

9 April 2026 1	Rosario Central (Argentina)	0–0	(Ecuador) Independiente del Valle
19:00

15 April 2026 2	Libertad (Paraguay)	0–1	(Argentina) Rosario Central
19:00

28 April 2026 3	UCV FC (Venezuela)	0–3	(Argentina) Rosario Central
20:00

5 May 2026 4	Rosario Central (Argentina)	1–0	(Paraguay) Libertad
19:00

19 May 2026 5	Rosario Central (Argentina)	4–0	(Venezuela) UCV FC
19:00

27 May 2026 6	Independiente del Valle (Ecuador)	1–0	(Argentina) Rosario Central
17:00

==== Round of 16 ====
13 August 2026 First leg	Rosario Central (Argentina)	v	(Brazil) Corinthians	Rosario
21:30 UTC−3				Stadium: Estadio Gigante de Arroyito; Referee: Andrés Matonte (Uruguay)

=== Copa Santa Fe ===
26 July 2026	Argentino de Rosario	1–1	Rosario Central
15:00
