= Sebastián Boselli =

Uruguayan football player (born 2003)

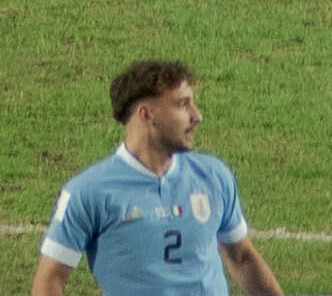
- Boselli playing for Uruguay at the 2023 FIFA U-20 World Cup final

Personal information
- Full name: Juan Sebastián Boselli Graf
- Date of birth: 4 December 2003 (age 22)
- Place of birth: Montevideo, Uruguay
- Height: 1.83 m (6 ft 0 in)
- Position: Defender

Team information
- Current team: Getafe
- Number: 15

Youth career
- Defensor Sporting

Senior career*
Years	Team	Apps	(Gls)
2022–2023	Defensor Sporting	15	(0)
2023–	River Plate	12	(0)
2024–2025	→ Estudiantes (loan)	23	(1)
2026	→ Getafe (loan)	11	(0)
2026–	Getafe	0	(0)

International career^{‡}
2022–2023	Uruguay U20	27	(0)
2024	Uruguay U23	4	(0)
Medal record
Men's football
Representing Uruguay
FIFA U-20 World Cup
Winner	2023 Argentina
South American U-20 Championship
Runner-up	2023 Colombia
- * Club domestic league appearances and goals as of 27 May 2026 ‡ National team caps and goals as of 2 February 2024

Juan Sebastián Boselli Graf (born 4 December 2003) is a Uruguayan professional footballer who plays as a defender for La Liga club Getafe CF.

== Early life ==
Boselli was born on 4 December 2003 in Montevideo, Uruguay to Pablo Boselli and Erika Graf. Many of his relatives are professional athletes; Pablo is a former padel player who captained the Uruguay national padel team in the 2008 Padel World Championship. He currently works as a football agent. Erika is a professional swimmer who competed in the 1996 Summer Olympics. His older brothers, Juan Martín and Juan Manuel, are also professional footballers, the latter of whom has also represented Uruguay on the international stage. Boselli is of paternal Italian descent and holds an Italian passport, whereas his mother is of German heritage.

== Club career ==
Boselli is a youth academy graduate of Defensor Sporting. He made his professional debut for the club on 7 September 2022 in a Uruguay Cup 1–0 victory against Racing Club de Montevideo. His team subsequently ended up winning the competition.

On 23 August 2023, an agreement was announced by River Plate to sign Boselli. The unveiling was published on River Plate's social media platforms on 29 August. Boselli made his official debut with the club on 9 December against Rosario Central in the semifinals of the 2023 Copa de la Liga Profesional, but would lose on penalties. On 22 December, he was once again called for the starting lineup in a rematch against Rosario Central, this time for the 2023 Trofeo de Campeones de la Liga Profesional. Boselli played the whole match and was praised for his performance; River eventually won 2–0 for their 71st title.

On 27 August 2024, Boselli joined fellow Argentine club Estudiantes on loan until December 2025. On 16 January 2026, Boselli was loaned to Spanish club Getafe for the rest of the season.

== International career ==
Boselli is a Uruguayan youth international, most notably being one of the standout players of the Uruguay national under-20 football team in the 2023 South American Youth Championship. He was then a part of the Uruguayan side that won the 2023 FIFA U-20 World Cup in Argentina. In June 2023, Boselli received his first call-up to the senior team for friendlies against Nicaragua and Cuba. In January 2024, he was named in Uruguay's squad for the 2024 CONMEBOL Pre-Olympic Tournament under Marcelo Bielsa.

== Career statistics ==
As of 13 November 2022

Appearances and goals by club, season and competition
Club	Season	League			Cup		Continental		Other		Other	
Club	Season	Division	Apps	Goals	Apps	Goals	Apps	Goals	Apps	Goals	Apps	Goals
Defensor Sporting	2022	Uruguayan Primera División	1	0	4	0	—		—		5	0
Defensor Sporting	2023	Uruguayan Primera División	9	0	—		1 (Note: Appearances in Copa Sudamericana.)	0	—		10	0
Career total			10	0	4	0	0	0	1	0	15	0

== Honours ==
Defensor Sporting

- Copa Uruguay: 2022

River Plate

- Trofeo de Campeones: 2023

Estudiantes

- Trofeo de Campeones de la Liga Profesional: 2024

Uruguay U20

- FIFA U-20 World Cup: 2023
- South American U-20 Championship runner-up: 2023
