= Alejo Véliz (footballer) =

Argentine footballer (born 2003)

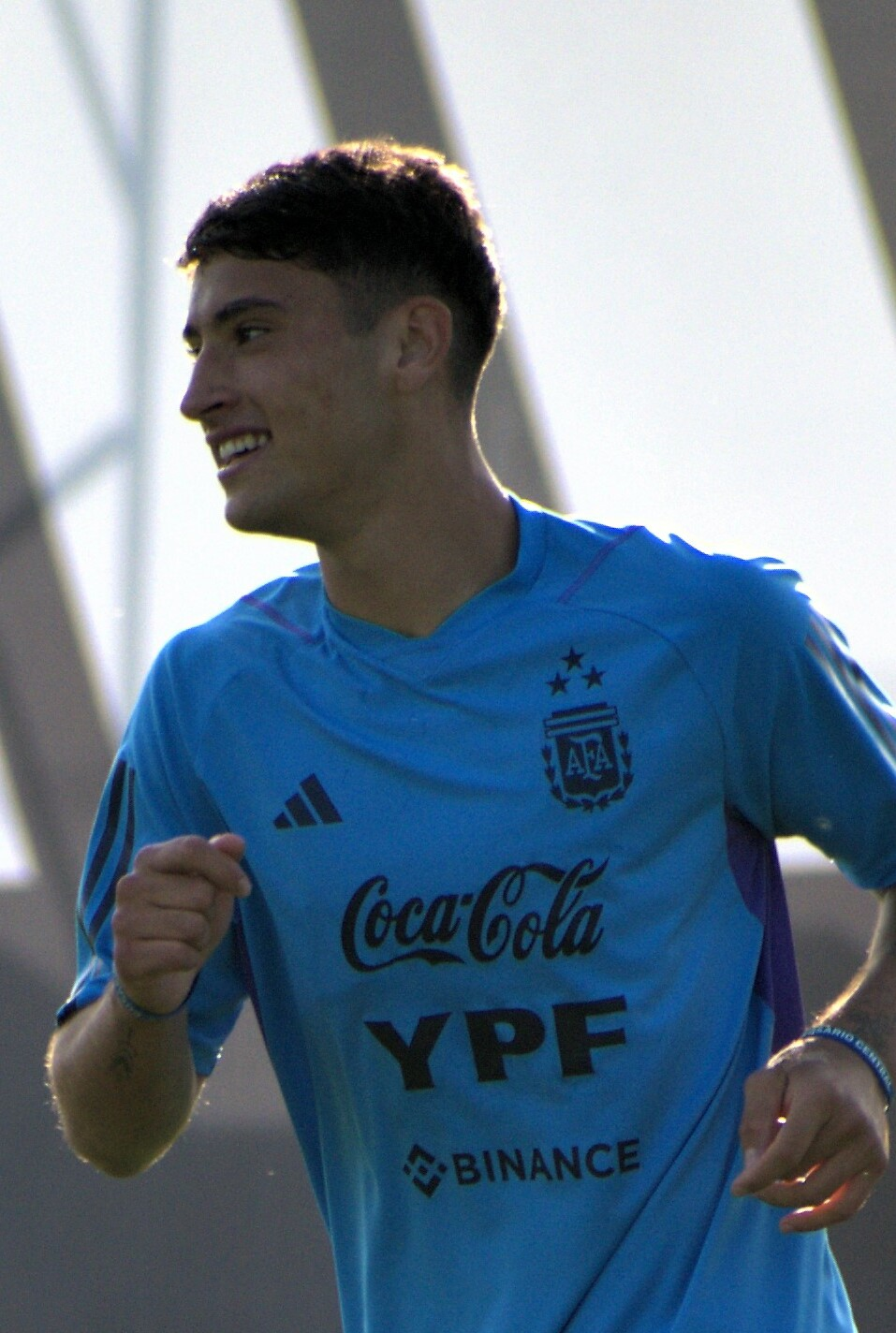
- Véliz training for Argentina U20 in 2023

Personal information
- Date of birth: 19 September 2003 (age 23)
- Place of birth: Santa Fe, Argentina
- Height: 1.86 m (6 ft 1 in)
- Position: Striker

Team information
- Current team: Bahia
- Number: 9

Youth career
- 2006–2009: MCSD Gödeken
- 2009–2019: Club UDC
- 2019–2021: Rosario Central

Senior career*
Years	Team	Apps	(Gls)
2021–2023	Rosario Central	59	(19)
2023–2026	Tottenham Hotspur	8	(1)
2024	→ Sevilla (loan)	6	(0)
2024–2025	→ Espanyol (loan)	27	(1)
2025–2026	→ Rosario Central (loan)	33	(9)
2026–	Bahia	15	(4)

International career^{‡}
2023	Argentina U20	9	(3)
- * Club domestic league appearances and goals as of 14:00, 11 November 2026 (UTC) ‡ National team caps and goals as of 12:41, 1 February 2026 (UTC)

Alejo Véliz (born 19 September 2003) is an Argentine professional footballer who plays as a striker for Campeonato Brasileiro Série A club Bahia.

== Early life ==
Alejo Véliz was born in Gödeken, a small town in the Province of Santa Fe, about 120 km from the city of Rosario. When he was only three years old, he started playing football with his hometown club but at the age of six he moved with his family to Bernardo de Irigoyen, another town in Santa Fe, where he soon started playing at the Club Unión Deportivo y Cultural and continued there until he reached 16 years old.

== Club career ==
=== Rosario Central ===
In late 2019 Véliz had his first trials with Rosario Central, but he only started playing for the club more than a year later as youth competitions had been halted by the COVID-19 pandemic. Véliz made his professional debut for Rosario Central on 23 July 2021, replacing Alan Marinelli during a 1–0 home victory against Venezuelan side Deportivo Táchira in the round of 16 of the Copa Sudamericana.

He played only a small number of games in the Primera División that season but it was during the next that he made a breakthrough, scoring his first goal on 2 May 2022 during the 2–1 away Copa de la Liga loss to Club Atlético Huracán. He scored his second in the next game, a 3–1 victory against Estudiantes, in a match that was also the last one of his idol and mentor, Marco Ruben, at the Rosario Central Stadium.

On 21 July 2022, Véliz scored the only goal of Rosario Central's Primera División victory against Newell's Old Boys in the historic Clásico Rosarino.

In July 2023, after performing well at the U-20 World Cup and playing effectively at Club Central, Alejo attracted the attention of many European clubs. These clubs were looking to sign Alejo in the future. On 2 August 2023, it was reported by various media outlets that Rosario Central had accepted an offer from Tottenham Hotspur for $17 million, plus $6 million in additional bonuses and a 10% sell-on clause for the Rosario club. With a total of $23 million in revenue, the sale of Alejo Véliz breaks the record for the most expensive sale by Rosario Central, surpassing the $11.5 million for Facundo Buonanotte to Brighton & Hove Albion of England in 2022, and the $8 million for Ángel Di María to Benfica of Portugal in 2007.

=== Tottenham Hotspur ===
On 8 August 2023, Véliz signed a six-year deal with English Premier League club Tottenham Hotspur in a transfer estimated to be worth £13 million. He made his debut for the club in a 2–1 home win against Liverpool, coming on as a substitute in the 90th minute. On 28 December 2023, Véliz scored his first goal for Tottenham in a 4–2 defeat to Brighton & Hove Albion.

==== Loan to Sevilla ====
On 2 February 2024, Sevilla announced a six-month loan deal for a new player. Upon arrival, he was given the number 10 shirt, previously worn by Diego Maradona during the 1992–93 season.

==== Loan to Espanyol ====
On 7 August 2024, Véliz went on loan to La Liga club Espanyol for the 2024–25 season. Later that month, on 31 August, he scored his first goal for the club in the 6th minute of stoppage time in a 2–1 win against Rayo Vallecano to give Espanyol their first win of the season.

==== Return to Rosario Central ====
On 8 July 2025, Veliz returned to Rosario Central on loan for the 2025–26 season.

=== Bahia ===
On 26 June 2026, Bahia announced the signing of Véliz on a permanent transfer from Tottenham Hotspur, with the move officially taking effect on 1 July. He signed a long-term contract until December 2031 for a reported fee of €9 million.

== International career ==
Véliz was first called up for the Argentina national under-20 team by Fernando Batista in October 2021. He was selected again by the new U20 head coach Javier Mascherano in February 2022 and during the following spring.

Véliz was once again called to the U20 squad under Mascherano in January 2023 for the South American U-20 Championship in Colombia in which Argentina was eliminated on the first round. There he played all 4 matches, starting against Paraguay and Peru.

In May 2023, he was included in the Argentine squad that took part in the 2023 FIFA U-20 World Cup tournament, hosted by Argentina. On 20 May he scored his first goal of the competition in the 2–1 victory over Uzbekistan. Three days later he scored again, this time in a 3–0 win against Guatemala.

== Career statistics ==
As of 11 November 2026

Appearances and goals by club, season and competition
Club	Season	League			National cup (Note: Includes Copa Argentina, Copa del Rey)		Continental		Other		Total	
Club	Season	Division	Apps	Goals	Apps	Goals	Apps	Goals	Apps	Goals	Apps	Goals
Rosario Central	2021	Primera División	4	0	0	0	1 (Note: Appearance(s) in Copa Sudamericana)	0	—		5	0
Rosario Central	2022	Primera División	32 (Note: Soccerway counts Copa de la Liga Profesional appearances as league appearances.)	8	2	0	0	0	—		34	8
Rosario Central	2023	Primera División	23	11	1	0	0	0	—		24	11
Rosario Central	Total		59	19	3	0	1	0	—		63	19
Tottenham Hotspur	2023–24	Premier League	8	1	0	0	—		2 (Note: Appearance(s) in EFL Trophy)	1	10	2
Sevilla (loan)	2023–24	La Liga	6	0	0	0	—		—		6	0
Espanyol (loan)	2024–25	La Liga	27	1	2	3	—		—		29	4
Rosario Central (loan)	2025	Primera División	16	5	—		—		—		16	5
Rosario Central (loan)	2026	Primera División	17	4	2	1	5 (Note: Appearance(s) in Copa Libertadores)	1	—		24	6
Rosario Central (loan)	Total		33	9	2	1	5	1	—		40	11
Bahia	2026	Série A	15	4	—		—		—		15	4
Total			148	34	7	4	6	1	2	1	163	40

== Honours ==
Rosario Central

- Primera División: 2025 Liga

Individual

- Argentine Primera División Best Team: 2023 (Substitute)
