= Ulises Sánchez =

Argentine footballer

Personal information
- Full name: Ulises Benjamín Sánchez Scotta
- Date of birth: 26 June 1998 (age 28)
- Place of birth: Río Segundo, Córdoba, Argentina
- Height: 1.67 m (5 ft 6 in)
- Position: Winger

Team information
- Current team: Gimnasia Mendoza (on loan from Belgrano)
- Number: 15

Youth career
- Belgrano

Senior career*
Years	Team	Apps	(Gls)
2019–	Belgrano	141	(11)
2026–	→ Gimnasia Mendoza	12	(0)
- * Club domestic league appearances and goals as of 16:38, 10 May 2026 (UTC)

Ulises Benjamín Sánchez Scotta (born 26 June 1998) is an Argentine professional footballer who plays as a winger for Gimnasia Mendoza, on loan from Belgrano.

== Career ==
Sánchez came through the youth setup at Belgrano, where he signed his first professional contract in 2019, signing until 2022. He made his first team debut on 16 November in a Primera Nacional in a 2–2 draw against Alvarado. He scored his first goal on 27 December 2020 in a 2–0 win against Nueva Chicago.

In 2022, Belgrano won the Primera Nacional and were promoted to the Liga Profesional. Thanks to the departure of Bruno Zapelli to Athletico Paranaense, he gained a starting spot for the following season. On 17 September 2023, he reached his 100-game milestone for Belgrano in a 0–0 draw against Godoy Cruz. For the 2023 Copa de la Liga Profesional, he was the assist leader and made the team of the tournament. On 31 March 2024, he suffered a cruciate ligament rupture in his right knee during a match against Tigre. Whilst recovering from the injury, he signed a new contract until December 2027. He returned after 11 months in a 2–0 victory over Aldosivi and registered an assist.

On 24 January 2026, it was announced that he had joined newly promoted Gimnasia Mendoza on loan until the end of the year, with an option to buy. He made his debut on 27 January in a 1–0 defeat to San Lorenzo.

== Career statistics ==
As of 4 February 2026

Appearances and goals by club, season and competition
Club	Season	League			Cup (Note: Includes Copa Argentina)		Continental		Other		Total	
Club	Season	Division	Goals	Apps	Apps	Goals	Apps	Goals	Apps	Goals	Apps	Goals
Belgrano	2019–20	Primera Nacional	4	0	—		—		—		4	0
Belgrano	2020	Primera Nacional	4	1	—		—		—		4	1
Belgrano	2021	Primera Nacional	29	1	—		—		—		29	1
Belgrano	2022	Primera Nacional	28	1	3	0	—		—		31	1
Belgrano	2023	Liga Profesional	41	4	2	0	—		—		43	4
Belgrano	2024	Liga Profesional	12	4	1	0	—		—		13	4
Belgrano	2025	Liga Profesional	23	0	3	0	—		—		26	0
Belgrano	Total		141	11	9	0	0	0	0	0	150	11
Gimnasia Mendoza (loan)	2026	Liga Profesional	2	0	—		—		—		2	0
Career total			143	11	9	0	0	0	0	0	152	11
