= Nahuel Martínez =

Argentine footballer

Personal information
- Full name: Nahuel Darío Martínez
- Date of birth: 10 February 1976 (age 50)
- Place of birth: Rosario, Argentina
- Height: 1.83 m (6 ft 0 in)
- Position: Centre-back

Youth career
- Central Córdoba de Rosario
- Newell's Old Boys
- 1993–1997: River Plate

Senior career*
Years	Team	Apps	(Gls)
1997–1998	Real San Luis		
1998–1999	Gallos de Aguascalientes		
1999–2001	Real San Luis		
2001–2003	Atlético Mexiquense		
2003–2004	Tigrillos Coapa		
2004–2005	Sportivo Belgrano		
2005	Argentino de Rosario		
2006	LDU Portoviejo		

Managerial career
- Mitre de Pérez (youth)
- Mitre de Pérez
- Argentino de Rosario (assistant)
- 2010–2012: Sportivo Belgrano (assistant)
- 2012–2014: Sarmiento de Leones
- 2014–2015: Sportivo Belgrano
- 2015–2016: Belgrano (youth)
- 2017: Alianza Atlético
- 2017–2018: Sportivo Las Parejas
- 2018–2019: Talleres (assistant)
- 2019: Huracán (assistant)
- 2020–2021: Unión La Calera (assistant)
- 2021–2025: Fortaleza (assistant)
- 2025–2026: Santos (assistant)
- * Club domestic league appearances and goals

Nahuel Darío Martínez (born 10 February 1976) is an Argentine football coach and former player who played as a centre-back.

== Playing career ==
Born in Rosario, Martínez finished his formation with River Plate, but never managed to make a first team appearance for the club. At the age of 21, he moved to Mexico and joined Real San Luis, and subsequently played for Gallos de Aguascalientes, Atlético Mexiquense and Tigrillos Coapa in the country.

In 2004, Martínez returned to his home country and joined Sportivo Belgrano. He subsequently played for Argentino de Rosario, and moved to Ecuador in January 2006 with LDU Portoviejo, but a serious knee injury forced him into retirement.

== Managerial career ==
After retiring, Martínez started working at Mitre de Pérez's youth sides, and eventually became the first team manager of the side. He later worked as an assistant manager at Argentino de Rosario and Sportivo Belgrano before becoming the manager of Sarmiento de Leones on 19 October 2012.

On 29 October 2014, Martínez agreed to return to Sportivo Belgrano, now as manager. He resigned the following 26 March, and later joined Belgrano as a manager of the youth sides.

On 8 December 2016, Martínez agreed to become the manager of Peruvian Primera División side Alianza Atlético for the upcoming season. On 24 February 2017, however, he was sacked after just four matches.

On 19 June 2017, Martínez was appointed at the helm of Sportivo Las Parejas. He resigned in November of the following year, and subsequently joined Juan Pablo Vojvoda's staff at Talleres, as his assistant.

Martínez followed Vojvoda to Huracán, Unión La Calera, Fortaleza and Santos, always under the same role.

== Personal life ==
Martínez's son Luca is also a footballer. A forward, he was born in Mexico and played for their national team.
