= Agustín Módica =

Italian footballer (born 2003)

Personal information
- Full name: Agustín Ignacio Módica
- Date of birth: 12 January 2003 (age 23)
- Place of birth: Pietra Ligure, Italy
- Position: Forward

Team information
- Current team: Gimnasia Mendoza
- Number: 29

Youth career
- Club Amistad y Progreso
- Club Grifa
- Club Social y Deportivo Río Negro
- 2019–2021: Central Córdoba
- 2021–2024: Rosario Central

Senior career*
Years	Team	Apps	(Gls)
2023–2026	Rosario Central	20	(3)
2026–	Gimnasia Mendoza	26	(14)
- * Club domestic league appearances and goals as of 00:00, 24 October 2026 (UTC)

Agustín Ignacio Módica (born 12 January 2003) is an Italian professional footballer who plays as a forward for Argentine Primera División club Gimnasia Mendoza.

== Early and personal life ==
Módica's father Pablo was born and raised in Argentina and is of Italian descent. Pablo played football for Central Córdoba, Argentino de Rosario and lower-league Italian clubs. Agustín was born in Pietra Ligure in the Province of Savona, when his father played for Albenga 1928. The family returned to Argentina when Módica was two years old. He holds dual Italian-Argentine citizenship.

== Club career ==
=== Rosario Central ===
Módica spent his youth career in the city of Rosario with Amistad y Progreso, Newell's Old Boys, Río Negro, Central Córdoba (30 goals) and Central Córdoba. He was signed to Rosario Central in 2021. In 2022, he took part in the Torneo Gobernador Luciano Molinas, a tournament for reserve teams of clubs in Rosario. He scored 19 goals in the first 13 games, including both on 26 June in a 2–0 win away to Newell's in the Rosario derby. In his next game, he was sent off in a 2–1 loss at home to Newell's; further incidents in the game caused the entire league season to be abandoned.

On 19 September 2023, Módica made his professional debut in the Argentine Primera División as a 69th-minute substitute for Tobías Cervera, in a 1–1 home draw against Independiente. The following 14 March he made his first start in the Copa Argentina, a penalty shootout win in the last 64 at home to Douglas Haig. On 23 April he made his continental debut in the group stage of the Copa Libertadores, scoring the equaliser in a 1–1 draw at Caracas ten minutes after replacing Cervera again.

Making a first league start on 10 May 2024, Módica took six minutes to score the opening goal of a 3–2 loss at Argentinos Juniors. Five days later, he netted twice in a 4–1 continental win over Caracas at the Estadio Gigante de Arroyito. On 19 July, in the first domestic game after the 2024 Copa América break, he scored another two goals in a 4–2 home win over Sarmiento.

== Honours ==
Rosario Central

- Argentine Primera Division: 2023 Copa de la Liga, 2025 Liga
