= Tomás O'Connor (footballer) =

Argentine footballer (born 2004)

Personal information
- Date of birth: 25 March 2004 (age 22)
- Place of birth: Rosario, Argentina
- Height: 1.73 m (5 ft 8 in)
- Position: Midfielder

Team information
- Current team: Gimnasia Mendoza (on loan from Rosario Central)
- Number: 28

Youth career
- –2018: ADIUR
- 2018–2022: Rosario Central

Senior career*
Years	Team	Apps	(Gls)
2022–	Rosario Central	60	(3)
2026–	→ Gimnasia Mendoza (loan)	4	(0)
- * Club domestic league appearances and goals as of 16:44, 10 May 2026 (UTC)

Tomás O'Connor (born 25 March 2004) is an Argentine professional footballer who plays as a midfielder for Argentine Primera División club Gimnasia Mendoza, on loan from Rosario Central.

== Club career ==
Born in Rosario, Santa Fe, Tomás O'Connor is of Irish descent He joined the Rosario Central academy in 2018, from youth team ADIUR in his hometown, a feeder club for Spanish side Villarreal.

He signed his first professional contract with the club in 2022.

The young midfielder made his professional debut for Rosario on the 7 May 2023 replacing Lautaro Giaccone and scoring in a 4–0 home Superliga win against Platense.

O'Connor established himself as a regular starter for the Canalla in the following 2023 Copa de la Liga Profesional. Despite suffering a severe concussion early September, he was along with Jaminton Campaz and Jorge Broun amongst the only three footballers to play every game of what would prove to be a title-winning campaign.

He signed a new contract with the club in March 2024, with a release clause of 20 million dollars.

== International career ==
Tomás O'Connor was first called by Javier Mascherano to play with the Argentina under-20s in 2022.

== Honours ==
Rosario Central

- Copa de la Liga Profesional: 2023
- Primera División: 2025 Liga
