= Santiago López (footballer, born 2006) =

Argentine footballer (born 2006)

Personal information
- Full name: Santiago López Grobin
- Date of birth: 9 February 2006 (age 20)
- Place of birth: Nono, Córdoba, Argentina
- Position: Winger

Team information
- Current team: Tigre (on loan from Independiente)
- Number: 22

Youth career
- 2017–2023: Independiente

Senior career*
Years	Team	Apps	(Gls)
2023–	Independiente	17	(1)
2025	→ Rosario Central (loan)	19	(2)
2026–	→ Tigre (loan)	30	(2)

International career^{‡}
2022–	Argentina U17	11	(3)
- * Club domestic league appearances and goals as of 17:53, 9 November 2026 (UTC) ‡ National team caps and goals as of 20 April 2025

Santiago López Grobin (born 9 February 2006) is an Argentine professional footballer who plays as a winger for Tigre, on loan from Independiente.

== Club career ==
Born in Nono, Córdoba, Santiago López started his career with Club Atlético Independiente at the age of eleven. On 10 February 2022 he signed his first professional contract with the club. On 16 July 2023 he made his competitive debut in a 1–0 win against Central Córdoba in Argentine Primera División.

On 4 February 2025, Rosario Central announced that they had signed López on loan.

== International career ==
Santiago López has represented Argentina at under-17 level.

== Career statistics ==
=== Club ===
As of 30 October 2026

Club	Season	League			Cup		Continental		Total	
Club	Season	Division	Apps	Goals	Apps	Goals	Apps	Goals	Apps	Goals
Independiente	2023	Primera División	1	0	0	0	—		1	0
Independiente	2024	Primera División	16	1	4	1	—		20	2
Independiente	Total		17	1	4	1	—		21	2
Rosario Central (loan)	2025	Primera División	19	2	1	0	—		20	2
Tigre (loan)	2026	Primera División	29	1	2	0	10	1	41	2
Career total			65	4	7	1	10	1	82	6

== Honours ==
Rosario Central

- Primera División: 2025 Liga
