= 2023 Copa de la Liga Profesional =

Tournament details
- Country: Argentina
- Dates: 17 August – 16 December 2023
- Teams: 28

Final positions
- Champions: Rosario Central (1st title)
- 2024 Copa Libertadores: Rosario Central

Tournament statistics
- Matches played: 204
- Goals scored: 402 (1.97 per match)
- Top goal scorer: Lucas Passerini (10 goals)

The 2023 Copa de la Liga Profesional (officially the Copa Sur Finanzas 2023, starting from the 8th round, for sponsorship reasons) was the fourth edition of the Copa de la Liga Profesional, an Argentine domestic cup. It began on 17 August and ended on 16 December 2023.

The competition was contested by 28 teams, 26 returning from the 2022 season as well as 2 promoted teams from the 2022 Primera Nacional (Belgrano and Instituto). Boca Juniors were the defending champions but they were eliminated in the group stage.

Rosario Central won their first title after they defeated Platense 1–0 in the final. As champions, Rosario Central qualified for the 2024 Copa Libertadores and the 2023 Trofeo de Campeones.

== Format ==
For the group stage, the 28 teams were drawn into two groups of fourteen teams each, playing on a single round-robin basis. Additionally, each team played one interzonal match against its rival team in the other zone. In each group, the top four teams advanced to the quarter-finals. The final stages (quarter-finals, semi-finals and final) were played on a single-legged basis.

== Draw ==
The draw for the group stage was held on 3 November 2022, 13:00, at AFA Futsal Stadium in Ezeiza. The 28 teams were drawn into two groups of fourteen containing one team from each of the interzonal matches. As the draw was held before the identity of the second promoted team was known, the interzonal rivals of Godoy Cruz and Barracas Central were called Alternativa 1 and Alternativa 2, respectively. They were:

- Alternativa 1: a team between Gimnasia y Esgrima (M), Instituto and Sarmiento (J)
- Alternativa 2: a team between Defensores de Belgrano, Estudiantes (BA) and Sarmiento (J)

Interzonal matches
Team 1	Team 2
Argentinos Juniors; Arsenal; Atlético Tucumán; Banfield; Barracas Central; Belgrano; Boca Juniors; Colón; Estudiantes (LP); Godoy Cruz; Huracán; Independiente; Newell's Old Boys; Tigre	Platense; Defensa y Justicia; Central Córdoba (SdE); Lanús; Alternativa 2; Talleres (C); River Plate; Unión; Gimnasia y Esgrima (LP); Alternativa 1; San Lorenzo; Racing; Rosario Central; Vélez Sarsfield

== Group stage ==
In the group stage, each group was played on a single round-robin basis. Additionally, in the seventh round, each team played one interzonal match against its rival team in the other zone. Teams were ranked according to the following criteria: 1. Points (3 points for a win, 1 point for a draw, and 0 points for a loss); 2. Goal difference; 3. Goals scored; 4. Fair play ranking; 5. Draw.

The top four teams of each group advanced to the quarter-finals.

=== Zone A ===
Pos	Team	Pld	W	D	L	GF	GA	GD	Pts	Qualification
1	Huracán	14	8	2	4	19	11	+8	26	Advance to Quarter-finals
2	River Plate	14	7	3	4	24	16	+8	24	Advance to Quarter-finals
3	Banfield	14	6	5	3	11	6	+5	23	Advance to Quarter-finals
4	Rosario Central	14	6	5	3	17	13	+4	23	Advance to Quarter-finals
5	Independiente	14	6	5	3	15	11	+4	23	
6	Vélez Sarsfield	14	6	4	4	17	14	+3	22	
7	Instituto	14	4	8	2	11	7	+4	20	
8	Colón	14	6	2	6	19	17	+2	20	
9	Talleres (C)	14	4	5	5	15	15	0	17	
10	Atlético Tucumán	14	4	5	5	9	12	−3	17	
11	Gimnasia y Esgrima (LP)	14	4	3	7	13	21	−8	15	
12	Argentinos Juniors	14	3	5	6	19	23	−4	14	
13	Barracas Central	14	3	5	6	10	21	−11	14	
14	Arsenal	14	3	4	7	10	15	−5	13	

Source: AFA

=== Zone B ===
Pos	Team	Pld	W	D	L	GF	GA	GD	Pts	Qualification
1	Racing	14	6	6	2	22	16	+6	24	Advance to Quarter-finals
2	Godoy Cruz	14	5	7	2	14	9	+5	22	Advance to Quarter-finals
3	Belgrano	14	5	6	3	20	18	+2	21	Advance to Quarter-finals
4	Platense	14	5	5	4	13	16	−3	20	Advance to Quarter-finals
5	Central Córdoba (SdE)	14	5	4	5	11	14	−3	19	
6	Newell's Old Boys	14	5	3	6	14	10	+4	18	
7	Boca Juniors	14	5	3	6	17	16	+1	18	
8	San Lorenzo	14	3	9	2	11	11	0	18	
9	Estudiantes (LP)	14	4	5	5	11	13	−2	17	
10	Sarmiento (J)	14	3	7	4	8	8	0	16	
11	Unión	14	3	7	4	10	13	−3	16	
12	Defensa y Justicia	14	3	5	6	12	16	−4	14	
13	Tigre	14	3	4	7	8	13	−5	13	
14	Lanús	14	2	6	6	9	14	−5	12	

Source: AFA

=== Results ===
==== Zone A ====
Home \ Away	ARG	ARS	ATU	BAN	BAR	COL	GLP	HUR	IND	INS	RIV	ROS	TAL	VEL
Argentinos Juniors			2–2					1–2	0–0	1–2	3–2		3–1	1–1
Arsenal	3–2			0–0		1–0	0–0			0–1		1–2		
Atlético Tucumán		1–0			1–0			0–2	1–2	0–0			1–0	
Banfield	0–1		0–0			2–1	2–0				1–1	3–0		
Barracas Central	1–1	2–1		1–0		2–1	1–2					1–1		
Colón	3–1		1–0				2–0				2–2	2–1	3–0	
Gimnasia y Esgrima (LP)	3–2		1–2						1–2		1–2	2–1	0–3	2–1
Huracán		1–0		2–0	0–0	2–1	2–0			1–3				3–0
Independiente		0–0		0–0	3–0	0–1		1–0		0–0				2–1
Instituto				0–1	0–0	3–1	1–1					0–0		0–1
River Plate		3–1	1–0		5–1			1–2	3–0	0–0			1–0	
Rosario Central	3–1		0–0					1–0	1–1		3–1		2–0	1–1
Talleres (C)		1–1		0–0	4–0			2–1	3–2	0–0				
Vélez Sarsfield		2–1	3–1	0–1	1–0	3–1					2–0		1–1	

Source: AFA
Legend: Blue = home team win; Yellow = draw; Red = away team win.

==== Zone B ====
Home \ Away	BEL	BOC	CCO	DYJ	EST	GOD	LAN	NOB	PLA	RAC	SLO	SAR	TIG	UNI
Belgrano		4–3	1–1		2–1			1–1	3–0				0–3	4–1
Boca Juniors					0–0		1–1	1–0	3–1				0–1	2–1
Central Córdoba (SdE)		0–3		2–1	0–1		0–0		3–2				1–0	2–0
Defensa y Justicia	0–2	1–0				2–2				2–2	0–1	1–1	2–0	
Estudiantes (LP)				2–1		0–1	1–1				0–0	2–1		1–3
Godoy Cruz	0–0	1–2	1–0						2–0	1–1	1–0			
Lanús	2–0			0–2		2–2				0–2	0–1	0–0	2–1	
Newell's Old Boys			2–0	3–0	0–1	0–2	1–0					0–1		1–1
Platense				0–0	2–1		2–1	0–0				1–0		1–0
Racing	4–1	2–1	1–1		2–1			2–1	1–2					
San Lorenzo	2–2	1–1	2–0					0–3	1–1	1–1				
Sarmiento (J)	0–0	1–0	0–1			0–0				1–1	0–0		2–0	
Tigre					0–0	1–0		0–2	1–1	1–2	0–0			
Unión				0–0		0–0	0–0			1–1	1–1	1–0	1–0	

Source: AFA
Legend: Blue = home team win; Yellow = draw; Red = away team win.

==== Interzonal matches ====
Home	Score	Away
Barracas Central	1–1	Sarmiento (J)
Colón	0–0	Unión
San Lorenzo	1–1	Huracán
Estudiantes (LP)	0–0	Gimnasia y Esgrima (LP)
Rosario Central	1–0	Newell's Old Boys
Racing	0–2	Independiente
Boca Juniors	0–2	River Plate
Talleres (C)	0–0	Belgrano
Platense	0–0	Argentinos Juniors
Tigre	0–0	Vélez Sarsfield
Arsenal	1–0	Defensa y Justicia
Banfield	1–0	Lanús
Atlético Tucumán	0–0	Central Córdoba (SdE)
Godoy Cruz	1–1	Instituto

Source:AFA
Legend: Blue = home team win; Yellow = draw; Red = away team win.

== Final stages ==
Starting from the quarter-finals, the teams played a single-elimination tournament on a single-leg basis with the following rules:

- The quarter-finals and the semi-finals were played at a neutral venue, with the higher-seeded serving as the home team.
  - If tied, a penalty shoot-out would be used to determine the winners.
- The Final was played at a neutral venue.
  - If tied, extra time would be played. If the score was still tied after extra time, a penalty shoot-out would be used to determine the champions.

=== Bracket ===
Quarter-finals
River Plate	2
Belgrano	1
Racing	2 (6)
Rosario Central (p)	2 (7)
Godoy Cruz (p)	0 (5)
Banfield	0 (3)
Huracán	1 (2)
Platense (p)	1 (4)

Semi-finals
River Plate	0 (0)
Rosario Central (p)	0 (2)
Godoy Cruz	1 (5)
Platense (p)	1 (6)

Final
Rosario Central	1
Platense	0

=== Quarter-finals ===
Team 1	Score	Team 2
Huracán	1–1 (2–4 p)	Platense
Racing	2–2 (6–7 p)	Rosario Central
River Plate	2–1	Belgrano
Godoy Cruz	0–0 (5–3 p)	Banfield

==== Matches ====
2 December 2023
18:30

Huracán	1–1	Platense
Mazzantti 41'	Report	Ferreyra 87'
Penalties
Cóccaro (penalty scored); Tobio (penalty missed); Alfonso (penalty scored); Torrent (penalty missed)	2–4	(penalty scored) Pellegrino; (penalty scored) Suso; (penalty scored) Servetto; (penalty scored) Díaz

Estadio San Juan del Bicentenario, Pocito
Referee: Pablo Echavarría

3 December 2023
21:30

Racing	2–2	Rosario Central
Martínez 80'; Quintero 90+7' (pen.)	Report	Campaz 45+6' (pen.); Sández 60'
Penalties
Quintero (penalty scored); Martínez (penalty scored); Moreno (penalty missed); Hauche (penalty scored); Vecchio (penalty scored); Almendra (penalty scored); Mura (penalty scored); Sigali (penalty missed)	6–7	(penalty scored) Lovera; (penalty scored) Campaz; (penalty missed) Mallo; (penalty scored) Sández; (penalty scored) Quintana; (penalty scored) Ortiz; (penalty scored) Bianchi; (penalty scored) Komar

Estadio Padre Ernesto Martearena, Salta
Referee: Fernando Rapallini

3 December 2023
18:30

River Plate	2–1	Belgrano
Rondón 61'; Colidio 90+3'	Report	Passerini 80'

Estadio Mario Alberto Kempes, Córdoba
Referee: Facundo Tello

2 December 2023
21:30

Godoy Cruz	0–0	Banfield
	Report
Penalties
D. Rodríguez (penalty scored); Conechny (penalty scored); S. Rodríguez (penalty scored); Allende (penalty scored); López (penalty scored)	5–3	(penalty scored) Bisanz; (penalty missed) Insúa; (penalty scored) Remedi; (penalty scored) Quirós

Estadio Único de Villa Mercedes, Villa Mercedes
Referee: Hernán Mastrángelo

=== Semi-finals ===
Team 1	Score	Team 2
Godoy Cruz	1–1 (5–6 p)	Platense
River Plate	0–0 (0–2 p)	Rosario Central

==== Matches ====
9 December 2023
18:00

Godoy Cruz	1–1	Platense
S. Rodríguez 28'	Report	Martínez 17'
Penalties
D. Rodríguez (penalty scored); Conechny (penalty scored); Allende (penalty missed); Larrosa (penalty missed); López (penalty scored); Fernández (penalty missed); Arce (penalty scored); Galdames (penalty missed); Barrios (penalty scored); Rasmussen (penalty missed)	5–6	(penalty scored) Pellegrino; (penalty scored) Suso; (penalty missed) Picco; (penalty scored) Díaz; (penalty missed) Ferreyra; (penalty missed) Cacciabue; (penalty scored) Morgantini; (penalty missed) Rius; (penalty scored) Vázquez; (penalty scored) Lozano

Estadio Único de San Nicolás, San Nicolás de los Arroyos
Referee: Leandro Rey Hilfer

9 December 2023
22:00

River Plate	0–0	Rosario Central
	Report
Penalties
E. Díaz (penalty missed); Palavecino (penalty missed); G. Martínez (penalty missed); Lanzini (penalty missed)	0–2	(penalty scored) Lovera; (penalty missed) Campaz; (penalty scored) Malcorra

Estadio Mario Alberto Kempes, Córdoba
Referee: Yael Falcón Pérez

=== Final ===
Team 1	Score	Team 2
Rosario Central	1–0	Platense

==== Match ====
16 December 2023
21:00

Rosario Central	1–0	Platense
Lovera 39'	Report

Estadio Único Madre de Ciudades, Santiago del Estero
Referee: Nicolás Ramírez

== Season statistics ==
=== Top goalscorers ===
Rank	Player	Club	Goals
1	(Argentina) Lucas Passerini	Belgrano	10
2	(Argentina) Luciano Gondou	Argentinos Juniors	9
3	(Uruguay) Miguel Merentiel	Boca Juniors	7
3	(Paraguay) Adam Bareiro	San Lorenzo	7
5	(Uruguay) Matías Cóccaro	Huracán	6
5	(Colombia) Miguel Borja	River Plate	6
5	(Venezuela) Salomón Rondón	River Plate	6
5	(Colombia) Jaminton Campaz	Rosario Central	6
5	(Argentina) Santiago Castro	Vélez Sarsfield	6
10	(Paraguay) Gabriel Ávalos	Argentinos Juniors	5
10	(Argentina) Tomás Galván	Colón	5
10	(Argentina) Matías Giménez Rojas	Independiente	5
10	(Argentina) Adrián Martínez	Instituto	5
10	(Paraguay) Ronaldo Martínez	Platense	5
10	(Colombia) Juan Fernando Quintero	Racing	5
10	(Argentina) Baltasar Rodríguez	Racing	5
10	(Argentina) Claudio Aquino	Vélez Sarsfield	5

Source: AFA

=== Top assists ===
Rank	Player	Club	Goals
1	(Argentina) Ulises Sánchez	Belgrano	7
2	(Uruguay) Agustín Ocampo	Platense	5
3	(Argentina) Iván Tapia	Barracas Central	3
3	(Argentina) Exequiel Zeballos	Boca Juniors	3
3	(Argentina) Adrián Martínez	Instituto	3
3	(Argentina) Pedro de la Vega	Lanús	3
3	(Argentina) Agustín Almendra	Racing	3
3	(Argentina) Emiliano Vecchio	Racing	3
3	(Argentina) Esequiel Barco	River Plate	3
3	(Argentina) Facundo Colidio	River Plate	3
3	(Argentina) Ignacio Fernández	River Plate	3
3	(Colombia) Jaminton Campaz	Rosario Central	3
3	(Argentina) Tomás O'Connor	Rosario Central	3
3	(Argentina) Alan Marinelli	Sarmiento (J)	3
3	(Argentina) Rodrigo Garro	Talleres (C)	3
3	(Argentina) Kevin Zenón	Unión	3
3	(Argentina) Claudio Aquino	Vélez Sarsfield	3

Source: AFA

== Awards ==
=== Best Team ===
The best team was a squad consisting of the most impressive players at the tournament.

Pos.	Player	Team
GK	(Argentina) Jorge Broun	Rosario Central
DF	(Argentina) Emanuel Coronel	Banfield
DF	(Chile) Paulo Díaz	River Plate
DF	(Argentina) Gastón Suso	Platense
DF	(Chile) Thomas Galdames	Godoy Cruz
MF	(Uruguay) Nicolás de la Cruz	River Plate
MF	(Argentina) Ulises Sánchez	Belgrano
MF	(Argentina) Ignacio Malcorra	Rosario Central
FW	(Argentina) Ignacio Pussetto	Huracán
FW	(Argentina) Lucas Passerini	Belgrano
FW	(Colombia) Jaminton Campaz	Rosario Central
Head coach	(Argentina) Miguel Ángel Russo	Rosario Central

Head coach
(Argentina) Russo

Substitutes

Pos.	Player	Team
GK	(Argentina) Diego Rodríguez	Godoy Cruz
DF	(Uruguay) Facundo Mallo	Rosario Central
DF	(Argentina) Fernando Tobio	Huracán
DF	(Argentina) Fernando Alarcón	Instituto
MF	(Peru) Luis Advíncula	Boca Juniors
MF	(Argentina) Aníbal Moreno	Racing
MF	(Argentina) Hernán López	Godoy Cruz
MF	(Argentina) Claudio Aquino	Vélez Sarsfield
MF	(Colombia) Juan Fernando Quintero	Racing
FW	(Argentina) Tadeo Allende	Godoy Cruz
FW	(Argentina) Santiago Castro	Vélez Sarsfield
FW	(Argentina) Luciano Gondou	Argentinos Juniors

== See also ==
- 2023 Argentine Primera División
- 2023 Copa Argentina
