= Central Córdoba =

Central Córdoba could refer to:

== Railways ==
- Córdoba Central Railway, an Argentine railway company
- Rosario Central Córdoba railway station, a railway station in Rosario

== Football clubs ==
- Central Córdoba de Rosario, an Argentine football club from Rosario, Santa Fe
- Central Córdoba de Santiago del Estero, an Argentine football club from Santiago del Estero
- Instituto Atlético Central Córdoba, an Argentine football from the city of Córdoba, commonly known as "Instituto"

== See also ==
- Córdoba (disambiguation)
