= Nicolás Servetto =

Argentine footballer

Personal information
- Date of birth: 27 March 1996 (age 30)
- Place of birth: Macachín, Argentina
- Height: 1.81 m (5 ft 11 1/2 in)
- Position: Forward

Team information
- Current team: Deportivo Madryn

Youth career
- Atlético Macachín
- 2010–2016: Vélez Sarsfield

Senior career*
Years	Team	Apps	(Gls)
2016–2019	Vélez Sarsfield	4	(0)
2017–2018	→ Brown (loan)	10	(1)
2018–2019	→ Deportes Puerto Montt (loan)	23	(6)
2019	→ Deportes Valdivia (loan)	12	(1)
2020–2021	Ferro de General Pico	5	(3)
2021	→ Almagro (loan)	36	(13)
2022–2026	Almagro	37	(13)
2023	→ Platense (loan)	37	(7)
2024	→ Atlético Tucumán (loan)	12	(0)
2024	→ Orense (loan)	13	(1)
2025	→ Gimnasia Mendoza (loan)	24	(1)
2026–	Deportivo Madryn	9	(2)
- * Club domestic league appearances and goals as of 17:00, 27 April 2026 (UTC)

Nicolás Servetto (born 27 March 1996) is an Argentine professional footballer who plays as a forward for Deportivo Madryn.

== Career ==
Following a youth spell with Atlético Macachín, Servetto joined Vélez Sarsfield in 2010. He made the first-team of Argentine Primera División side Vélez Sarsfield in 2016, making his professional bow on 10 April during a win at the Estadio Gigante de Arroyito versus Rosario Central. Four appearances followed across the 2016 and 2016–17 seasons for Vélez Sarsfield. On 11 August 2017, Servetto was loaned to Brown of Primera B Nacional. In his sixth match, he netted the first goal of his senior career versus Atlético de Rafaela. Overall, he featured eleven times for them in all competitions as they reached the play-off semi-finals.

In June 2018, Servetto moved to Primera B de Chile side Deportes Puerto Montt. He left twelve months later, following six goals in twenty-three fixtures; which included a goal on debut versus Cobresal on 28 July.

== Career statistics ==
As of 1 December 2024.

Club statistics
Club	Division	League			Cup		Continental		Total	
Club	Division	Season	Apps	Goals	Apps	Goals	Apps	Goals	Apps	Goals
Vélez Sarsfield	Primera División	2016	3	0	1	0	—		4	0
Vélez Sarsfield	Primera División	2016-17	1	0	—		—		1	0
Vélez Sarsfield	Total		4	0	1	0	0	0	5	0
Brown	Primera B Nacional	2017-18	11	1	—		—		11	1
Deportes Puerto Montt	Primera B	2018	13	5	—		—		13	5
Deportes Puerto Montt	Primera B	2019	10	1	—		—		10	1
Deportes Puerto Montt	Total		23	6	0	0	0	0	23	6
Deportes Valdivia	Primera B	2019	12	1	—		—		12	1
Ferro de General Pico	Torneo Federal A	2019-20	5	3	1	0	—		6	3
Almagro	Primera B Nacional	2020	4	0	—		—		4	0
Almagro	Primera B Nacional	2021	32	13	—		—		32	13
Almagro	Primera B Nacional	2022	37	13	—		—		37	13
Almagro	Total		73	26	0	0	0	0	73	26
Platense	Primera División	2023	27	6	11	1	—		38	7
Atlético Tucumán	Primera División	2024	12	0	1	0	—		13	0
Orense	Serie A	2024	13	1	1	0	—		14	1
Career total			180	44	15	1	0	0	195	45
