= Giovanni Bogado =

Paraguayan footballer (born 2001)

Personal information
- Full name: Giovanni Emmanuel Bogado Duarte
- Date of birth: 16 September 2001 (age 25)
- Place of birth: Limpio, Paraguay
- Height: 1.75 m (5 ft 9 in)
- Position: Midfielder

Team information
- Current team: Club Olimpia (on loan from Rosario Central)
- Number: 20

Youth career
- Club Libertad

Senior career*
Years	Team	Apps	(Gls)
2016–2023	Club Libertad	3	(0)
2020–2021	→ Fernando-LM (loan)		
2022	→ Atyrá (loan)		
2023	→ Ameliano (loan)	19	(2)
2023–	Rosario Central	4	(0)
2024–2025	→ Ameliano (loan)	41	(3)
2024–	→ Olimpia (loan)	6	(0)

International career^{‡}
2017–2019	Paraguay U17	5	(0)
- * Club domestic league appearances and goals as of 13 August 2025 ‡ National team caps and goals as of May 26, 2017

Giovanni Emmanuel Bogado Duarte (born 16 September 2001) is a Paraguayan football player who plays as midfielder for Club Olimpia, on loan from Rosario Central.
