= Luciano Ferreyra =

Argentine footballer (born 2002)

Personal information
- Full name: Luciano Ismael Ferreyra
- Date of birth: 19 February 2002 (age 24)
- Place of birth: Roque Sáenz Peña, Argentina
- Height: 1.68 m (5 ft 6 in)
- Position: Left winger

Team information
- Current team: San Martín Tucumán (on loan from Rosario Central)

Youth career
- Club Olimpo SP
- 2015–2020: Rosario Central

Senior career*
Years	Team	Apps	(Gls)
2020–	Rosario Central	60	(4)
2023–2024	→ Platense (loan)	26	(1)
2024	→ Universidad de Concepción (loan)	10	(1)
2025	→ Central Norte (loan)	31	(7)
2026–	→ San Martín Tucumán (loan)	3	(0)

International career
2019	Argentina U17	6	(0)
- * Club domestic league appearances and goals as of 17:39, 4 May 2026 (UTC)

Luciano Ismael Ferreyra (born 19 February 2002) is an Argentine professional footballer who plays as a left winger for San Martín Tucumán, on loan from Rosario Central.

== Club career ==
Ferreyra started out with local club Club Olimpo SP, prior to moving to Santa Fe with Rosario Central in 2015. After five years progressing through their youth ranks, Ferreyra moved into first-team football in October 2020. He made his senior debut on 2 November against Godoy Cruz, playing eighty-six minutes before being substituted off for Joaquín Laso in a 2–1 win.

In the second half of 2024, Ferreyra moved to Chile and joined on loan to Universidad de Concepción.

== International career ==
Ferreyra was called up to represent Argentina at the 2019 South American U-17 Championship in Peru. He appeared six times as his country won the trophy. Ferreyra also trained with the senior team at the 2019 Copa América.

== Career statistics ==
As of 3 November 2020.

Appearances and goals by club, season and competition
Club	Season	League			Cup		League Cup		Continental		Other		Total	
Club	Season	Division	Apps	Goals	Apps	Goals	Apps	Goals	Apps	Goals	Apps	Goals	Apps	Goals
Rosario Central	2020–21 (Note: Soccerway counts Copa de la Liga Profesional appearances as league appearances.)	Primera División	1	0	0	0	0	0	—		0	0	1	0
Career total			1	0	0	0	0	0	—		0	0	1	0

== Honours ==
Argentina U17

- South American U-17 Championship: 2019
