= Facundo Mallo =

Uruguayan footballer (born 1995)

Personal information
- Full name: Facundo Mallo Blanco
- Date of birth: 16 January 1995 (age 31)
- Place of birth: Montevideo, Uruguay
- Height: 1.88 m (6 ft 2 in)
- Position: Centre back

Team information
- Current team: Rosario Central
- Number: 14

Senior career*
Years	Team	Apps	(Gls)
2014–2017	Liverpool Montevideo	62	(3)
2017–2018	CA Torque	33	(2)
2019	Dinamo București	3	(0)
2019–2020	Rapid București	27	(3)
2020–2024	Defensor Sporting	77	(4)
2023	→ Rosario Central (loan)	39	(1)
2024–	Rosario Central	57	(2)

International career
2014–2015	Uruguay U20	1	(0)
- * Club domestic league appearances and goals as of 17:08, 10 July 2026 (UTC)

Facundo Mallo Blanco (born 16 January 1995) is a Uruguayan professional footballer who plays for Rosario Central as a defender.

== Career ==
Mallo started his career in 2014 with Liverpool, making his debut in a Uruguayan Segunda División match against Progreso, in a 6–0 win. That same season, his team secure promotion to the Uruguayan Primera División by winning 2014-15 second division.

On 1 August 2017, Mallo joined Torque.

On 3 April 2019, Mallo joined Romanian Liga I club Dinamo București. On 24 June of the same year, he joined second division side Rapid București.

On 30 October 2020, Mallo returned to Uruguay, joining Defensor Sporting on a free transfer and signing a contract until December 2021. On 29 December 2021, he signed an extension until December 2023.

On 5 January 2023, Mallo joined Argentine Primera División club Rosario Central, on a one-year loan with a buy option. On 30 November 2023, Rosario Central executed the buy option for half of his rights, paying Defensor $400,000. On 16 December 2023, he played in the final of Copa de la Liga Profesional, where Rosario Central beat Platense 1–0.

== Career statistics ==
As of 6 May 2024

Appearances and goals by club, season and competition
Club	Season	League			Cup		Continental (Note: Appearances in Copa Sudamericana and Copa Libertadores)		Total	
Club	Season	Division	Apps	Goals	Apps	Goals	Apps	Goals	Apps	Goals
Liverpool	2014–15	Uruguayan Segunda División	13	3	—		—		13	3
Liverpool	2015–16	Uruguayan Primera División	18	0	—		—		18	0
Liverpool	2016	Uruguayan Primera División	14	0	—		—		14	0
Liverpool	2017	Uruguayan Primera División	17	0	—		1	0	18	0
Liverpool	Total		62	3	0	0	1	0	63	3
CA Torque	2017	Uruguayan Segunda División	7	0	—		—		7	0
CA Torque	2018	Uruguayan Primera División	26	2	—		—		26	2
CA Torque	Total		33	2	0	0	0	0	33	2
Dinamo București	2018–19	Romanian Liga I	3	0	—		—		3	0
Rapid București	2019–20	Romanian Liga II	27	3	—		—		27	3
Defensor Sporting	2020	Uruguayan Primera División	17	1	—		—		17	1
Defensor Sporting	2021	Uruguayan Segunda División	25	1	—		—		25	1
Defensor Sporting	2022	Uruguayan Primera División	35	2	—		—		35	2
Defensor Sporting	Total		77	4	0	0	0	0	77	4
Rosario Central (loan)	2023	Argentine Primera División	39	1	2	1	—		41	2
Rosario Central	2024	Argentine Primera División	14	0	—		3	0	17	0
Rosario Central	Total		53	1	2	1	3	0	58	2
Career total			255	13	2	1	4	0	261	14

== Honours ==
Defensor Sporting

- 2022 Copa Uruguay

Rosario Central

- Copa de la Liga Profesional: 2023
- Primera División: 2025 Liga
- Supercopa Internacional: 2026
