= Luca Martínez =

Mexican footballer (born 2001)

Personal information
- Full name: Luca Leovino Martínez Dupuy
- Date of birth: 5 June 2001 (age 25)
- Place of birth: San Luis Potosí, Mexico
- Height: 1.83 m (6 ft 0 in)
- Position: Forward

Team information
- Current team: Juárez (on loan from Godoy Cruz)
- Number: 17

Youth career
- Rosario Central

Senior career*
Years	Team	Apps	(Gls)
2020–2025	Rosario Central	80	(12)
2025–	Godoy Cruz	27	(2)
2026–	→ Juárez (loan)	25	(2)

International career^{‡}
2021	Mexico U21	2	(2)
2023–	Mexico U23	5	(2)
2024–	Mexico	1	(0)
Medal record
Men's football
Representing Mexico
Toulon Tournament
Second place	2023 France	Team
- * Club domestic league appearances and goals as of 20 November 2026 ‡ National team caps and goals as of 31 May 2024

Luca Leovino Martínez Dupuy (born 5 June 2001) is a Mexican professional footballer who plays as a forward for Liga MX club Juárez, on loan from Primera Nacional club Godoy Cruz.

== Club career ==
Born in San Luis Potosí, Martínez made his professional debut for Argentine club Rosario Central on 2 November 2020 in a league match against Godoy Cruz.

In February 2025, Martínez transferred to Godoy Cruz.

In January 2026, he joined Mexican club Juárez on loan.

== International career ==
In October 2020, Martínez received his first national team call up by Raúl Chabrand for the Mexico national under-20 team training camp.

On 9 October 2021, Martínez made his Mexico U21 debut in a friendly match against the Romania U21 side scoring a goal in the minute 47'. On 11 October 2021, Martínez scored in the minute 14 'in a friendly match in which ended as a 2–0 victory against Sweden U21.

Martínez made his senior Mexico debut on 31 of May 2024, in a friendly match against Bolivia.

In June 2024, he took part in the Maurice Revello Tournament in France.

== Personal life ==
Martínez is the son of Argentine parents which allows him to play for the Argentina national team as well as the Mexico national team having been born in Mexico while his father Nahuel Martínez was playing in the country.

== Career statistics ==
=== Club ===
As of match played on 20 November 2026

Appearances and goals by club, season and competition
Club	Season	League			Cup (Note: Includes Copa Argentina)		Continental		Other		Total	
Club	Season	Division	Apps	Goals	Apps	Goals	Apps	Goals	Apps	Goals	Apps	Goals
Rosario Central	2020–21	Argentine Primera División	7	0	1	0	—		—		8	0
Rosario Central	2021	Argentine Primera División	24	5	—		8 (Note: Appearances in Copa Sudamericana)	1	—		32	6
Rosario Central	2022	Argentine Primera División	7	1	—		—		—		7	1
Rosario Central	2023	Argentine Primera División	22	2	1	0	—		1 (Note: Appearance in Trofeo de Campeones de la Liga Profesional)	0	24	2
Rosario Central	2024	Argentine Primera División	19	4	—		5	0	—		24	4
Rosario Central	2025	Argentine Primera División	1	0	—		—		—		1	0
Rosario Central	Total		80	12	2	0	13	1	1	0	96	13
Godoy Cruz	2025	Argentine Primera División	27	2	—		6	2	—		33	4
Juárez	2025–26	Liga MX	14	0	—		—		—		14	0
Juárez	2026–27	Liga MX	11	2	—		—		—		11	2
Juárez	Total		25	2	—		—		—		25	2
Career total			132	16	2	0	19	3	1	0	154	19

=== International ===
As of match played on 31 May 2024

Appearances and goals by national team and year
National team	Year	Apps	Goals
Mexico	2024	1	0
Total		1	0

== Honours ==
Rosario Central

- Copa de la Liga Profesional: 2023
