= Octavio Bianchi =

Argentine footballer (born 1995)

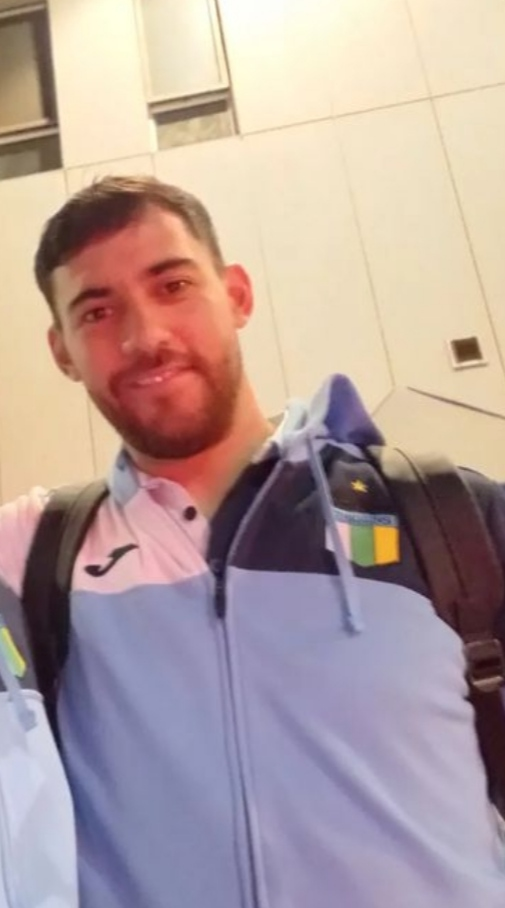
- Bianchi with O'Higgins in 2024.

Personal information
- Full name: Octavio Andrés Bianchi
- Date of birth: 5 October 1995 (age 31)
- Place of birth: Maipú, Buenos Aires, Argentina
- Height: 1.87 m (6 ft 2 in)
- Position: Forward

Team information
- Current team: Gimnasia Jujuy

Youth career
- Sarmiento (Ayacucho)

Senior career*
| Years | Team | Apps | (Gls) |
| 2016 | Sarmiento (Ayacucho) | 16 | (4) |
| 2017 | Ferro Carril Sud (Olavarría) | 22 | (6) |
| 2018 | Unión (Maipú) | 0 | (0) |
| 2018 | Belgrano (Coronel Vidal) | 0 | (0) |
| 2019 | Ever Ready (Dolores) | 9 | (4) |
| 2020–2021 | Club Ciudad de Bolívar | 11 | (1) |
| 2021 | Sansinena | 26 | (13) |
| 2022–2026 | All Boys | 40 | (15) |
| 2023 | → Rosario Central (loan) | 22 | (0) |
| 2024 | → O'Higgins (loan) | 25 | (5) |
| 2025 | → Orense (loan) | 21 | (1) |
| 2026– | Gimnasia Jujuy | 9 | (1) |
- * Club domestic league appearances and goals as of 17:32, 28 April 2026 (UTC)

Octavio Bianchi (born 5 October 1995) is an Argentine professional footballer who plays as a forward for Gimnasia Jujuy.

== Career ==
Bianchi was born in Maipú, Buenos Aires, Argentina. He was announced in January 2024 as player for O'Higgins. He scored in his first match with the Chilean club, against Deportes Copiapó in the victory 3–1, scoring the second goal at the 6th minute of the match.

== Honours ==
Rosario Central

- Copa de la Liga Profesional: 2023
