= Agustín Sández =

Argentine footballer

Personal information
- Full name: Gonzalo Agustín Sández
- Date of birth: 16 January 2001 (age 25)
- Place of birth: Lanús, Argentina
- Height: 1.84 m (6 ft 0 in)
- Position: Left-back

Team information
- Current team: Rosario Central
- Number: 3

Youth career
- Boca Juniors

Senior career*
Years	Team	Apps	(Gls)
2021–2023	Boca Juniors	32	(1)
2023–	Rosario Central	92	(4)

International career^{‡}
2024–	Paraguay	5	(0)
- * Club domestic league appearances and goals as of 17:01, 10 July 2026 (UTC) ‡ National team caps and goals as of 23:01, 18 November 2025

Gonzalo Agustín Sández (born 16 January 2001) is professional footballer currently playing as a left-back for Rosario Central. Born in Argentina, he plays for the Paraguay national team.

== Personal life ==
Born in Argentina, Sández is of Paraguayan descent through his father. He was called up to the Paraguay national team for a set of 2026 FIFA World Cup qualification matches in October 2024.

== Career statistics ==
=== Club ===
As of 7 November 2025

Club	Season	League			Cup		Continental		Other		Total	
Club	Season	Division	Apps	Goals	Apps	Goals	Apps	Goals	Apps	Goals	Apps	Goals
Boca Juniors	2021	Argentine Primera División	9	0	1 (Note: Appearances in the Copa Argentina)	0	4 (Note: Appearances in the Copa Libertadores)	0	0	0	14	0
Boca Juniors	2022	Argentine Primera División	13	1	2	0	1	0	1 (Note: Appearance in Trofeo de Campeones de la Liga Profesional)	0	17	1
Boca Juniors	2023	Argentine Primera División	10	0	1	0	1	0	1 (Note: Appearance in Supercopa Argentina)	0	13	0
Boca Juniors	Total		32	1	4	0	6	0	2	0	44	1
Rosario Central	2023	Argentine Primera División	15	1	0	0	5	0	—		20	1
Rosario Central	2024	Argentine Primera División	26	1	1	0	4 (Note: Appearances in Copa Sudamericana)	2	1	0	32	3
Rosario Central	2025	Argentine Primera División	32	1	2	0	—		—		34	1
Rosario Central	Total		73	3	3	0	9	2	1	0	86	5
Career total			105	4	7	0	14	2	3	0	130	6

=== International ===
As of match played 18 November 2025

Appearances and goals by national team and year
National team	Year	Apps	Goals
Paraguay	2024	2	0
Paraguay	2025	3	0
Total		5	0

== Honours ==
Boca Juniors

- Copa Argentina: 2019-20
- Primera División: 2022
- Copa de la Liga Profesional: 2022
- Supercopa Argentina: 2022

Rosario Central

- Copa de la Liga Profesional: 2023
- Primera División: 2025 Liga
- Supercopa Internacional: 2026
