= Carlos Quintana (footballer) =

Argentine footballer

Personal information
- Full name: Carlos Gustavo David Quintana
- Date of birth: 11 February 1988 (age 38)
- Place of birth: Glew, Argentina
- Height: 1.91 m (6 ft 3 in)
- Position: Centre-back

Team information
- Current team: Deportivo Riestra

Youth career
- Lanús

Senior career*
Years	Team	Apps	(Gls)
2007–2012	Lanús	48	(2)
2010–2011	→ Huracán (loan)	23	(3)
2012–2014	Douglas Haig	54	(1)
2014–2015	Patronato	55	(6)
2016–2018	Talleres	60	(2)
2019–2022	Argentinos Juniors	59	(3)
2022	→ Patronato (loan)	25	(1)
2023–2026	Rosario Central	93	(6)
2026–	Deportivo Riestra	9	(0)
- * Club domestic league appearances and goals as of 17:34, 13 November 2026 (UTC)

Carlos Gustavo David Quintana (born 11 February 1988, in Glew) is an Argentine professional footballer who plays as a centre-back for Deportivo Riestra in the Argentine Primera División.

== Career ==
After completing the youth setup of Lanús, Quintana made his breakthrough in the first team during 2007. He won with Lanús the 2007 Apertura, the first league title in the history of the club.

In 2010, Quintana was loaned to Huracán for a 50,000 US dollars fee and an option to buy.

== Honours ==
Lanús

- Primera División: 2007 Apertura

Talleres (C)

- Primera B Nacional: 2016

Patronato

- Copa Argentina: 2021–22

Rosario Central

- Copa de la Liga: 2023
- Primera División: 2025 Liga
