= Axel Werner =

Argentine footballer (born 1996)

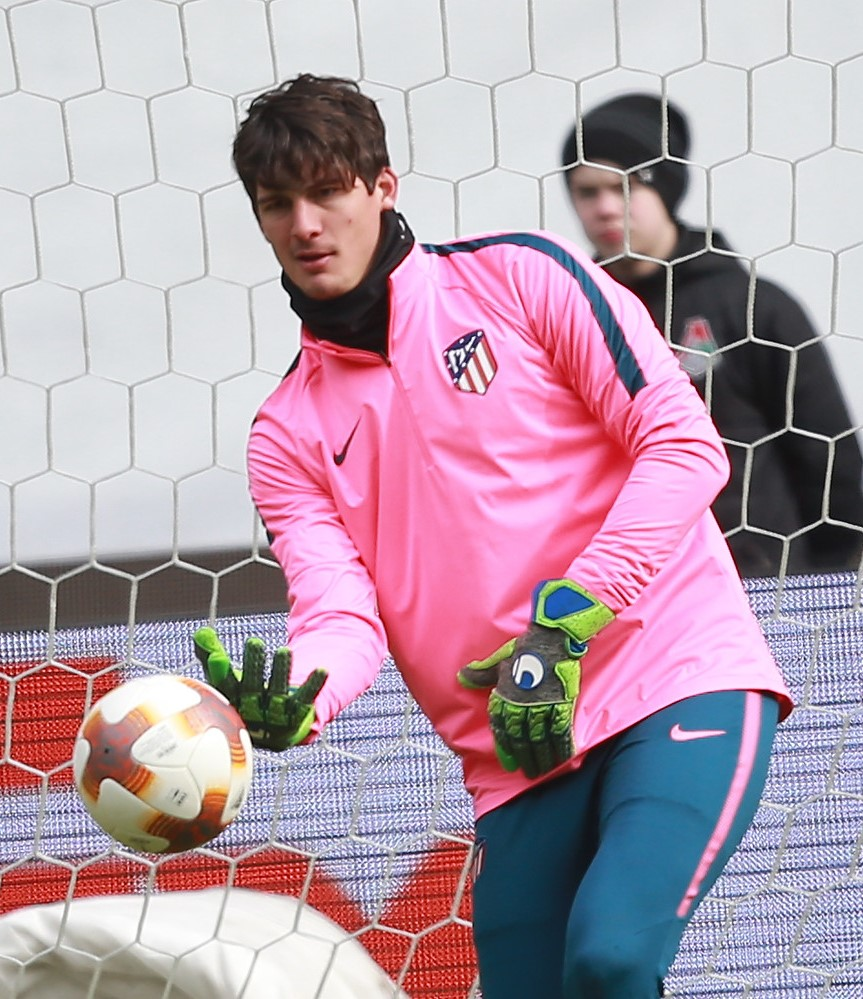
- Werner in 2018

Personal information
- Full name: Axel Wilfredo Werner
- Date of birth: 28 February 1996 (age 30)
- Place of birth: Rafaela, Argentina
- Height: 1.92 m (6 ft 4 in)
- Position: Goalkeeper

Team information
- Current team: Rosario Central (on loan from Elche)
- Number: 1

Youth career
- Atlético Rafaela

Senior career*
Years	Team	Apps	(Gls)
2015–2016	Atlético Rafaela	11	(0)
2016–2021	Atlético Madrid	1	(0)
2016–2017	→ Boca Juniors (loan)	2	(0)
2018	→ Huesca (loan)	6	(0)
2019	→ Málaga (loan)	0	(0)
2019–2021	→ Atlético San Luis (loan)	26	(0)
2021–	Elche	2	(0)
2022	→ Arsenal de Sarandí (loan)	10	(0)
2023–2026	→ Rosario Central (loan)	8	(0)
2026	→ Aldosivi (loan)	15	(0)
2026–	→ Rosario Central (loan)	0	(0)

International career
2013	Argentina U17	1	(0)
- * Club domestic league appearances and goals as of 17:32, 11 May 2026 (UTC)

Axel Wilfredo Werner (born 28 February 1996) is an Argentine professional footballer as a goalkeeper for Rosario Central, on loan from Spanish club Elche.

== Club career ==
=== Atlético Rafaela ===
Born in Rafaela, Werner was an Atlético Rafaela youth graduate. On 10 August 2015 he made his professional debut, starting in a 5–1 routing of Deportivo Merlo, for the year's Copa Argentina.

Werner made his Primera División debut on 3 October 2015, starting in a 1–1 away draw against Arsenal. In March 2016 he was chosen as a first-choice, as starter Germán Montoya was injured; the latter subsequently moved to Belgrano.

=== Atlético Madrid and loans ===
On 20 August 2016, Werner signed a five-year contract with La Liga club Atlético Madrid, being immediately loaned to Boca Juniors for one season. He returned to Atleti ahead of the 2017–18 season, being third-choice behind Jan Oblak and Miguel Ángel Moyà.

On 8 March 2018, after Moyà was released, Werner made his competitive debut for Atlético by starting in a 3–0 UEFA Europa League home defeat of FC Lokomotiv Moscow. On 29 April of the following year, he made his La Liga debut by playing the full 90 minutes in a 1–0 win at Deportivo Alavés.

On 11 July 2018, Werner joined newly promoted La Liga club SD Huesca on one-year loan. A third-choice behind Roberto Santamaría and Aleksandar Jovanović, he only featured in eight league matches overall during the campaign, as his side suffered relegation

On 21 June 2019, Werner once again went on loan, this time to Atlético San Luis in Mexico. After spending his first season as a backup to Carlos Felipe Rodríguez, he became the first-choice option in 2020–21 season, after his loan was extended for a further year.

=== Elche ===
On 1 September 2021, free agent Werner returned to Spain and its top tier, after signing a two-year contract with Elche CF. After being a third-choice behind Édgar Badía and Kiko Casilla, he was loaned to Arsenal de Sarandí back in his home country the following 31 January.

On 30 January 2022, Werner was loaned out to Argentine club Arsenal de Sarandí until the end of 2022. On 15 August 2023, after spending the entire 2022–23 as a backup to Badía as the club suffered relegation, he moved to Rosario Central on a one-year loan, with a buyout clause.

== International career ==
In 2013, Werner was called up to Argentina under-17s for the year's FIFA U-17 World Cup, as a backup to Augusto Batalla. He appeared in only one match in the tournament, a 1–4 loss against Sweden on 8 November.

On 1 July 2016, Werner was called up for the Summer Olympics in the place of Batalla, who was impeded to play by his club, River Plate.

== Career statistics ==
=== Club ===
As of match played 2 May 2023

Appearances and goals by club, season and competition
Club	Season	League			National Cup		Continental		Other		Total	
Club	Season	Division	Apps	Goals	Apps	Goals	Apps	Goals	Apps	Goals	Apps	Goals
Atlético Rafaela	2015	Argentine Primera División	2	0	2	0	—		—		4	0
Atlético Rafaela	2016	Argentine Primera División	9	0	1	0	—		—		10	0
Atlético Rafaela	Total		11	0	3	0	—		—		14	0
Atlético Madrid	2017–18	La Liga	1	0	0	0	2 (Note: Appearance(s) in UEFA Europa League)	0	—		3	0
Boca Juniors (loan)	2016–17	Argentine Primera División	2	0	0	0	—		—		2	0
Huesca (loan)	2018–19	La Liga	6	0	2	0	—		—		8	0
Málaga (loan)	2018–19	Segunda División	0	0	0	0	—		—		0	0
Atlético San Luis (loan)	2019–20	Liga MX	1	0	6	0	—		—		7	0
Atlético San Luis (loan)	2020–21	Liga MX	25	0	0	0	—		—		25	0
Atlético San Luis (loan)	Total		26	0	6	0	—		—		32	0
Elche	2021–22	La Liga	0	0	2	0	—		—		2	0
Elche	2022–23	La Liga	2	0	1	0	—		—		1	0
Elche	Total		2	0	3	0	—		—		5	0
Arsenal de Sarandí (loan)	2022	Argentine Primera División	10	0	1	0	—		—		11	0
Rosario Central (loan)	2023	Argentine Primera División	0	0	—		—		0	0	11	0
Career total			58	0	15	0	2	0	0	0	75	0

== Honours ==
Boca Juniors

- Primera División: 2016–17

Atlético Madrid

- UEFA Europa League: 2017–18

Rosario Central

- Copa de la Liga Profesional: 2023
- Primera División: 2025 Liga
- Supercopa Internacional: 2026
