= Jaminton Campaz =

Colombian footballer (born 2000)

Personal information
- Full name: Jaminton Leandro Campaz
- Date of birth: 24 May 2000 (age 26)
- Place of birth: Tumaco, Nariño, Colombia
- Height: 1.65 m (5 ft 5 in)
- Position: Attacking midfielder

Team information
- Current team: Rosario Central
- Number: 8

Youth career
- Deportes Tolima

Senior career*
Years	Team	Apps	(Gls)
2017–2021	Deportes Tolima	70	(15)
2021–2023	Grêmio	42	(3)
2023	→ Rosario Central (loan)	40	(9)
2024–	Rosario Central	80	(12)

International career^{‡}
2017	Colombia U17	13	(3)
2021–	Colombia	15	(2)
Medal record
Men's football
Representing Colombia
Copa América
Third place	2021 Brazil
- * Club domestic league appearances and goals as of 22:54, 20 September 2026 (UTC) ‡ National team caps and goals as of 23:00, 2 October 2026 (UTC)

Jaminton Leandro Campaz (born 24 May 2000) is a Colombian professional footballer who plays as an attacking midfielder for Argentine Primera División club Rosario Central and the Colombia national team.

Campaz began his career with Deportes Tolima, making his professional debut in 2017 and becoming a regular starter over the following seasons. He helped Tolima win the 2018 and 2021 Categoría Primera A titles before moving to Brazilian side Grêmio in 2021. After one season in the Campeonato Brasileiro Série A and a promotion-winning campaign in Campeonato Brasileiro Série B, he joined Rosario Central in 2023, initially on loan and later on a permanent deal. In his first year in Argentina, Campaz played a key role in Rosario Central's triumph in the Copa de la Liga Profesional and was named in the competition's team of the season.

At youth level, he represented Colombia at the 2017 South American U-17 Championship and the 2017 FIFA U-17 World Cup. Campaz made his senior debut for the Colombia in 2021. He was included in Colombia's squads for the 2021 Copa América and the 2024 Copa América, and was later selected for the 2026 FIFA World Cup.

== Club career ==
=== Deportes Tolima ===
Campaz came through the youth system of Deportes Tolima and was promoted to the first team in the Colombian Categoría Primera A in 2017. He made his professional debut on 1 April 2017, starting in a 3–0 home win against Tigres F.C. and scoring one of the goals at the age of 16.

In the 2018 season, Campaz began to feature more regularly and was used mainly as an attacking midfielder and winger. His breakthrough came in 2019 and 2020, when he became a regular starter and contributed goals and assists in league and cup competition. During this period he scored a series of long-range goals for Tolima, including a placed shot from outside the area against Deportivo Cali on 3 October 2019, and a powerful effort from distance against Deportivo Pasto on 13 September 2020.

Campaz was part of the Tolima squads that won the Colombian top-flight title in 2018 and again in 2021. During his final seasons with the club he also appeared in the Copa Libertadores and Copa Sudamericana, before leaving in 2021 to join Grêmio. He made 93 appearances and scored 21 goals for Tolima across all competitions.

=== Grêmio ===
In August 2021, Campaz joined Grêmio of the Campeonato Brasileiro Série A from Deportes Tolima, signing a contract until December 2025.

Campaz made his Série A debut for Grêmio in the closing stages of the 2021 season and scored a goal in a 4–3 home victory against Atlético Mineiro on 9 December 2021, converting the team's second goal in an early 3–0 lead at Arena do Grêmio. Despite the win, results elsewhere meant that Grêmio were relegated and finished the season in the bottom four.

In 2022, Campaz remained with Grêmio in the Campeonato Brasileiro Série B. He took part in the club's promotion campaign back to the top flight and featured in the team that won the Campeonato Gaúcho that season. He left the club in 2023 after two seasons in Brazil.

=== Rosario Central ===
In 2023, Campaz joined Rosario Central in the Argentine Primera División on a move from Grêmio that initially took the form of a loan before becoming permanent. He became a regular starter under coach Miguel Ángel Russo, playing primarily as a left winger. During the 2023 Copa de la Liga Profesional he scored six goals and provided three assists in 17 matches.

On 7 October 2023, Campaz scored the second goal in a 2–0 Rosario derby win over Newell's Old Boys at the Estadio Gigante de Arroyito, a long-range strike that gave Rosario Central a two-goal advantage. In the final stages of the competition he continued to contribute goals and assists as Rosario Central remained unbeaten at home.

Campaz played in the 2023 Copa de la Liga Profesional final against Platense, started on the left wing, and helped Rosario Central to a 1–0 win at Estadio Único Madre de Ciudades, securing the Copa de la Liga Profesional title. At the end of the tournament he was named in the official team of the season for the Copa de la Liga Profesional.

== International career ==
Campaz was selected for the Colombia national team for 2021 Copa América and made his debut on 17 June 2021 in a match against Venezuela.

Campaz was selected in Colombia's 26-man squad for the 2026 FIFA World Cup. On 17 June, in their opening 3–1 win against Uzbekistan, he scored his first World Cup goal in the 99th minute, marking both his first World Cup goal and Colombia's latest ever regulation time goal in a World Cup match. After Colombia's Round of 16 elimination at the World Cup, Campaz faced criticism and reported threats following a missed late chance in extra time against Switzerland, who advanced after a penalty shootout. The Colombian Football Federation condemned the abuse and expressed support for the player.

== Career statistics ==
=== Club ===
As of 20 September 2026

Appearances and goals by club, season and competition
Club	Season	League			State league (Note: Includes Campeonato Gaúcho)		National cup (Note: Includes Copa Colombia, Copa do Brasil, Copa Argentina)		Continental		Other		Total	
Club	Season	Division	Apps	Goals	Apps	Goals	Apps	Goals	Apps	Goals	Apps	Goals	Apps	Goals
Deportes Tolima	2017	Liga DIMAYOR	5	1	—		1	0	—		—		6	1
Deportes Tolima	2018	Liga DIMAYOR	0	0	—		—		—		—		0	0
Deportes Tolima	2019	Liga DIMAYOR	30	5	—		3	0	2 (Note: One appearance in Copa Libertadores, one appearance in Copa Sudamericana)	0	1 (Note: Appearances in Superliga Colombiana)	0	36	5
Deportes Tolima	2020	Liga DIMAYOR	18	5	—		3	1	5 (Note: Four appearances and two goals in Copa Libertadores, one appearance and one goal in Copa Sudamericana)	3	—		26	9
Deportes Tolima	2021	Liga DIMAYOR	17	4	—		—		8 (Note: Appearances in Copa Sudamericana)	2	—		24	6
Deportes Tolima	Total		70	15	0	0	7	1	15	5	1	0	93	21
Grêmio	2021	Série A	13	1	—		1	0	—		—		14	1
Grêmio	2022	Série B	29	2	9	2	1	0	—		—		39	4
Grêmio	2023	Série A	—		1	0	—		—		—		1	0
Grêmio	Total		42	3	10	2	2	0	0	0	0	0	54	5
Rosario Central (loan)	2023	Liga Profesional de Fútbol	40	9	—		2	1	—		9 (Note: One appearance in Trofeo de Campeones de la Liga Profesional, eight appearances in play-offs)	3	51	13
Rosario Central	2024	Liga Profesional de Fútbol	31	4	—		2	0	9 (Note: Six appearances in Copa Libertadores, three appearances and one goal in Copa Sudamericana)	1	—		42	5
Rosario Central	2025	Liga Profesional de Fútbol	28	5	—		1	0	—		—		29	5
Rosario Central	2026	Liga Profesional de Fútbol	21	3	—		0	0	8 (Note: Appearances in Copa Libertadores)	0	—		29	3
Rosario Central	Total		120	21	—		5	0	17	1	9	3	151	26
Career total			232	39	10	2	14	2	32	6	10	3	298	52

=== International ===
As of match played 2 October 2026

Appearances and goals by national team and year
National team	Year	Apps	Goals
Colombia	2021	1	0
Colombia	2022	0	0
Colombia	2023	1	0
Colombia	2024	0	0
Colombia	2025	6	0
Colombia	2026	7	2
Total		15	2

Scores and results list Colombia's goal tally first, score column indicates score after each Campaz goal.

List of international goals scored by Jaminton Campaz
No.	Date	Venue	Opponent	Score	Result	Competition
1	29 March 2026	Northwest Stadium, Landover, United States	France	1–3	1–3	Friendly
2	17 June 2026	Estadio Azteca, Mexico City, Mexico	Uzbekistan	3–1	3–1	2026 FIFA World Cup

== Honours ==
Grêmio

- Campeonato Gaúcho: 2022
- Recopa Gaúcha: 2022

Rosario Central

- Copa de la Liga Profesional: 2023
- Argentine Primera División: 2025
- Supercopa Internacional: 2026
