= Francesco Lo Celso =

Argentine footballer (born 2000)

Personal information
- Full name: Francesco Lo Celso
- Date of birth: 5 March 2000 (age 26)
- Place of birth: Rosario, Argentina
- Position: Midfielder

Team information
- Current team: Estudiantes RC
- Number: 40

Youth career
- 2010–2016: Rosario Central
- 2017: Paris Saint-Germain
- 2017–2019: Rosario Central

Senior career*
Years	Team	Apps	(Gls)
2020–2026	Rosario Central	55	(1)
2024–2025	→ Instituto (loan)	6	(0)
2026–	Estudiantes RC	4	(0)

International career
2018–2019	Argentina U20	4	(1)
Medal record
Representing Argentina
Men's football
South American U-20 Championship
Runner-up	2019 Chile
- * Club domestic league appearances and goals as of 17:43, 8 November 2026 (UTC)

Francesco Lo Celso (born 5 March 2000) is an Argentine professional footballer who plays as a midfielder for Estudiantes RC.

== Career ==
Lo Celso is a youth academy product of Rosario Central. He was also part of Paris Saint-Germain youth team for few months. He made his professional debut on 1 March 2020, coming on as a 79th-minute substitute for Diego Zabala in a 3–1 league win against Arsenal Sarandí.

Lo Celso is an Argentine youth international and was part of under-20 team which finished as runners-up at 2019 South American U-20 Championship.

On 10 September 2024, Lo Celso joined Instituto on loan until December 2025, with an option to buy.

== Personal life ==
Lo Celso is of Italian heritage. His elder brother Giovani is also a professional footballer and plays for La Liga club Real Betis and the Argentina national team.
