= Juan Komar =

Argentine footballer

Personal information
- Full name: Juan Cruz Komar
- Date of birth: 13 August 1996 (age 30)
- Place of birth: Rosario, Argentina
- Height: 1.89 m (6 ft 2 in)
- Position: Centre-back

Team information
- Current team: Rosario Central

Youth career
- Boca Juniors

Senior career*
Years	Team	Apps	(Gls)
2014–2016	Boca Juniors	1	(0)
2016	→ Talleres (loan)	8	(0)
2016–2022	Talleres	109	(3)
2022–	Rosario Central	92	(2)
2024	→ Huracán (loan)	0	(0)
- * Club domestic league appearances and goals as of 17:09, 21 December 2025 (UTC)

Juan Cruz Komar (born 13 August 1996) is an Argentine professional footballer who plays as a centre-back for Rosario Central.

== Club career ==
=== Boca Juniors ===
Komar began his career in the Boca Juniors youth system. At 3 November 2014, he made his first team debut in a league game against San Lorenzo de Almagro in a 2–0 away defeat. He played the entire game.

=== Talleres ===
In January 2016, he joined Talleres.

=== Rosario Central ===
==== Loan to Huracán ====
on 23 July 2024, Komar joined Club Atlético Huracán on loan from Rosario Central with an option to purchase. Komar was returned to Rosario Central on 31 August 2024 due to ongoing health issues, without making an appearance for Huracán.

== Honours ==
Boca Juniors

- Primera División: 2015
- Copa Argentina: 2014-15

Talleres

- Primera B Nacional: 2016

Rosario Central

- Copa de la Liga Profesional: 2023
- Primera División: 2025 Liga
- Supercopa Internacional: 2026
