= Lautaro Giaccone =

Argentine footballer (born 2001)

Personal information
- Full name: Lautaro Darío Giaccone
- Date of birth: 1 February 2001 (age 25)
- Place of birth: San Francisco, Argentina
- Height: 1.72 m (5 ft 8 in)
- Position: Attacking midfielder

Team information
- Current team: Columbus Crew (on loan from Argentinos Juniors)
- Number: 26

Youth career
- 9 de Julio
- Los Andes (SF)
- Sportivo Belgrano
- 2017–2021: Rosario Central

Senior career*
Years	Team	Apps	(Gls)
2021–2025	Rosario Central	77	(7)
2022	→ Ferro Carril (loan)	27	(2)
2025–	Argentinos Juniors	22	(1)
2026–	→ Columbus Crew (loan)	8	(0)

International career
- Argentina U18
- * Club domestic league appearances and goals as of 8 November 2026

Lautaro Darío Giaccone (born 1 February 2001) is an Argentine professional footballer who plays as an attacking midfielder for Columbus Crew on loan from Argentinos Juniors.

== Club career ==
Giaccone started his career with 9 de Julio at the age of three, before having stints in San Francisco with Los Andes, aged six, and Sportivo Belgrano. In January 2017, Giaccone joined the academy of Rosario Central at the age of fifteen; having had a trial in the preceding December. In August 2020, the attacking midfielder signed his first professional contract. He made the first-team's substitute's bench on 2 January 2021 for a win over Defensa y Justicia, though wasn't selected to come on in the Copa de la Liga Profesional. Giaccone's senior debut arrived on 9 January in the same competition against Lanús.

On 10 March 2022, Giaccone joined Primera Nacional club Ferro Carril Oeste on loan for the rest of 2022 with a purchase option.

In July 2025, Giaccone joined Argentinos Juniors for $1 million, signing a contract until the end of 2029.

== International career ==
Giaccone represented Argentina at U18 level. He was selected for Esteban Solari's preliminary squad ahead of the 2019 COTIF Tournament in Spain; though didn't make the final cut. He also received a call-up from the U20s at around that time, though Rosario didn't let him join up with the squad.

== Personal life ==
Giaccone is the son of football manager Ariel Giaccone, who managed Sportivo Belgrano whilst his son was on their academy books.

== Career statistics ==
As of 10 January 2021.

Appearances and goals by club, season and competition
Club	Season	League			Cup		League Cup		Continental		Other		Total	
Club	Season	Division	Apps	Goals	Apps	Goals	Apps	Goals	Apps	Goals	Apps	Goals	Apps	Goals
Rosario Central	2020–21 (Note: Soccerway counts Copa de la Liga Profesional appearances as league appearances.)	Primera División	1	0	0	0	0	0	—		0	0	1	0
Career total			1	0	0	0	0	0	—		0	0	1	0
