= Víctor Malcorra =

Argentine footballer

Personal information
- Full name: Víctor Ignacio Malcorra
- Date of birth: 24 July 1987 (age 39)
- Place of birth: Río Colorado, Río Negro, Argentina
- Height: 1.70 m (5 ft 7 in)
- Position: Left winger

Team information
- Current team: Unión Santa Fe

Youth career
- CAI

Senior career*
Years	Team	Apps	(Gls)
2008–2011	CAI	81	(6)
2011–2014	Aldosivi	103	(10)
2014–2016	Unión Santa Fe	65	(18)
2016–2018	Tijuana	74	(7)
2018–2020	UNAM	64	(4)
2020–2021	Atlas	37	(5)
2021–2022	Lanús	36	(8)
2022–2026	Rosario Central	117	(21)
2026	Independiente	15	(1)
2026–	Unión Santa Fe	13	(1)
- * Club domestic league appearances and goals as of 17:24, 22 November 2026 (UTC)

Víctor Ignacio Malcorra (born 24 July 1987) is an Argentine professional footballer who plays as a left winger for Argentine club Unión Santa Fe.

== Career ==
On 11 June 2016, Malcorra signed for Club Tijuana from Unión de Santa Fé. On 4 June 2018, he moved to Pumas UNAM.

== Honours ==
Rosario Central

- Copa de la Liga Profesional: 2023
- Primera División: 2025 Liga
