= Tobías Cervera =

Footballer (born 2002)

Personal information
- Full name: Tobías Ariel Cervera Cadi
- Date of birth: 6 August 2002 (age 24)
- Place of birth: Mar del Plata, Argentina
- Position: Midfielder

Team information
- Current team: Gimnasia Mendoza (on loan from Rosario Central)
- Number: 37

Youth career
- Quilmes

Senior career*
Years	Team	Apps	(Gls)
2022–2023	Aldosivi	32	(9)
2023–	Rosario Central	23	(3)
2024–2025	→ Platense (loan)	8	(0)
2025	→ Aldosivi (loan)	11	(1)
2026–	→ Gimnasia Mendoza (loan)	0	(0)

International career^{‡}
2024–	Syria	3	(0)
- * Club domestic league appearances and goals as of 17:34, 15 February 2026 (UTC) ‡ National team caps and goals as of 14 October 2024

Tobías Ariel Cervera Cadi (born 6 August 2002), also known as Tobias Al-Qadi (Arabic: توبياس القاضي), is a professional footballer who plays as a midfielder for Argentine Primera División club Gimnasia Mendoza, on loan from Rosario Central. Born in Argentina, he made his senior international debut for Syria in 2024.

== Club career ==
Born in Mar del Plata, Buenos Aires Province, Cervera played for Quilmes from the age of 5 and had a trial at River Plate when he was 10. He played for a week at Ferro Carril Oeste until he left due to homesickness. In 2017, the 14-year-old began training with Quilmes's first team and played in the local league.

Cervera began his professional career at Aldosivi in the Argentine Primera División in 2022. His debut on 26 June was a 5–0 loss at Racing Club in which he played the final 15 minutes in place of Leandro Maciel. He totalled 10 appearances for the campaign, two of which were starts, and his team were relegated.

In the Primera Nacional in 2023, Cervera recorded 22 games and 9 goals before leaving on 31 August for top-flight Rosario Central, on a deal to last until the end of 2026. The club bought 50% of his economic rights, and Quilmes retained 20%; the transfer fee was reported as US$1 million. On 23 September, he scored his first goal in the league, opening a 2–1 loss at Gimnasia La Plata.

On 10 September 2024, Cervera joined Platense on loan, with an option to buy. Having played a back-up role in their Apertura win in the first half of the 2025 season, he returned to Aldosivi on 23 July for the remainder of the calendar year.

== International career ==
Cervera's maternal grandfather was from Syria. In May 2024, Cervera and two other players born in Argentina were called up to the Syria national football team by Argentine manager Héctor Cúper, ahead of 2026 FIFA World Cup qualifiers against North Korea and Japan. On his debut on 11 June in the latter game in Hiroshima, he started in a 5–0 loss that saw his team eliminated.

== Honours ==
Platense

- Argentine Primera División: 2025 Apertura
