= Kevin Ortiz =

Argentine footballer

Personal information
- Date of birth: 18 September 2000 (age 26)
- Place of birth: Roldán, Greater Rosario, Santa Fe province, Argentina.
- Position: Midfielder

Team information
- Current team: Atlético Tucumán (on loan from Rosario Central)
- Number: 45

Youth career
- –2022: Rosario Central

Senior career*
Years	Team	Apps	(Gls)
2022–	Rosario Central	89	(2)
2025–	→ Atlético Tucumán (loan)	30	(0)
- * Club domestic league appearances and goals as of 17:41, 9 November 2026 (UTC) ‡ National team caps and goals as of 14:20, 18 September 2022 (UTC)

Kevin Ortiz (born 18 September 2000) is an Argentine professional footballer who plays as a midfielder for Atlético Tucumán, on loan from Rosario Central in the Argentine Primera División.

== Career ==
=== Rosario Central ===
In February 2021, Ortiz signed his first contract with Rosario Central keeping him at the club until December 2022. He spent time working under Germán Rivarola in the reserves of Rosario. Ortiz made his professional debut as a substitute for Rosario Central against Arsenal de Sarandí on 11 February 2022, the same match Facundo Buonanotte made his league debut, under Kily Gonzalez’s management. It was under Carlos Tevez however, that Ortiz made his first start. Tevez had taken him, Tomás O’Connor, and Franco Bustos Glavas from Rivalova's reserves to train with the first team squad at the beginning of August 2022. After appearing as a substitute against Tigre on 9 August 2022 he then started a run of games in the next consecutive Argentine Primera División matches, starting against Barracas Central on 13 August 2022, in a 3–1 victory. On 9 September 2022 Ortiz scored his first goal in the top division with a shot from outside the box in a 2–1 away defeat to Argentinos Juniors.

==== Loan to Atlético Tucumán ====
In June 2025, Ortiz joined Atlético Tucumán on loan.
