= Maximiliano Lovera =

Argentine footballer

Personal information
- Full name: Maximiliano Alberto Lovera
- Date of birth: 9 March 1999 (age 27)
- Place of birth: Laguna Blanca, Argentina
- Height: 1.70 m (5 ft 7 in)
- Position: Winger

Team information
- Current team: Independiente Santa Fe (on loan from Rosario Central)

Youth career
- Rosario Central

Senior career*
Years	Team	Apps	(Gls)
2016–2019	Rosario Central	55	(3)
2019–2024	Olympiacos	24	(0)
2021	→ Racing (loan)	26	(0)
2022	→ Omonia (loan)	12	(0)
2022–2023	→ Ionikos (loan)	24	(2)
2023–2024	→ Rosario Central (loan)	22	(3)
2024–	Rosario Central	32	(0)
2026–	→ Santa Fe (loan)	0	(0)

International career
2018	Argentina U20	1	(1)
- * Club domestic league appearances and goals as of 17:10, 21 December 2025 (UTC)

Maximiliano Alberto Lovera (born 9 March 1999) is an Argentine professional footballer who plays as a winger for Categoría Primera A club Independiente Santa Fe on loan from Primera División club Rosario Central.

== Club career ==
=== Rosario Central ===
Lovera joined the Rosario Central senior squad for the 2016 Argentine Primera División season, making his professional debut on 2 May 2016 during a loss to Gimnasia y Esgrima. He made one further appearance during 2016, versus Quilmes on 15 May. In his first match of 2016–17, in December, Lovera netted the first goal of his career in a defeat against Lanús. He ended that season with two goals in sixteen fixtures.

=== Olympiacos ===
On 31 August 2019, after three goals in sixty-nine matches, Lovera left Rosario Central for Super League Greece side Olympiacos; for a reported initial fee of €3.3 million. His first appearance came against Lamia on 28 September. He netted two goals in a round of sixteen victory over Kalamata on 15 January 2020 in the Greek Cup; the final for which, in August, was postponed due to Lovera's positive COVID-19 test. After featuring in a cup match against Panetolikos on 20 January 2021, Lovera departed on loan.

==== Racing Club loan ====
In early February 2021, Racing Club completed the loan signing of Lovera; until the succeeding December.

==== AC Omonia loan ====
On 31 January 2022, in the last day of winter transfer window, Omonia completed the loan signing of Lovera, until the summer of 2022.

=== Rosario Central ===
After a year on loan from Olympiacos, he made a permanent move to the club in August 2024.

== International career ==
In July 2017, Lovera was selected for Argentina U20 training. He was again chosen by the U20s in the following May, to train with the senior squad at the 2018 FIFA World Cup in Russia. In October 2018, Lovera played and scored for the U20s in a friendly with Ecuador.

== Personal life ==
In August 2020, it was announced that Lovera had tested positive for COVID-19; amid the pandemic. This caused the 2019–20 Greek Cup final, which Olympiacos later won, to be postponed.

== Career statistics ==
As of match played 5 January 2022.

Club statistics
Club	Season	League			Cup		League Cup		Continental		Other		Total	
Club	Season	Division	Apps	Goals	Apps	Goals	Apps	Goals	Apps	Goals	Apps	Goals	Apps	Goals
Rosario Central	2016	Argentine Primera División	2	0	0	0	—		0	0	0	0	2	0
Rosario Central	2016–17	Argentine Primera División	15	2	1	0	—		—		0	0	16	2
Rosario Central	2017–18	Argentine Primera División	15	0	0	0	—		2 (Note: Appearance(s) in the Copa Sudamericana)	0	0	0	17	0
Rosario Central	2018–19	Argentine Primera División	19	0	5	0	2	0	3 (Note: Appearance(s) in the Copa Libertadores)	0	1 (Note: Appearance(s) in the Supercopa Argentina)	0	30	0
Rosario Central	2019–20	Argentine Primera División	4	1	0	0	0	0	—		0	0	4	1
Rosario Central	Total		55	3	6	0	2	0	5	0	1	0	69	3
Olympiacos	2019–20	Super League Greece	19	0	5	2	—		5 (Note: Three appearances in the Copa Libertadores, two appearances in the UEFA Europa League)	0	—		29	2
Olympiacos	2020–21	Super League Greece	4	0	1	0	—		0	0	—		5	0
Olympiacos	2021–22	Super League Greece	1	0	1	0	—		0	0	—		2	0
Olympiacos	Total		24	0	7	2	—		5	0	0	0	36	2
Racing Club (loan)	2020–21	Argentine Primera División	26	0	2	0	0	0	8	0	0	0	36	0
Omonia (Ioan)	2021–22	Cypriot First Division	12	0	5	0	—		—		—		17	0
Career total			117	3	20	2	2	0	18	0	1	0	158	5

== Honours ==
Rosario Central

- Copa Argentina: 2017–18
- Copa de la Liga Profesional: 2023
- Primera División: 2025 Liga

Olympiacos

- Super League Greece: 2019–20
- Greek Cup: 2019–20

Omonia

- Cypriot Cup: 2021–22
