= Jorge Broun =

Argentine footballer

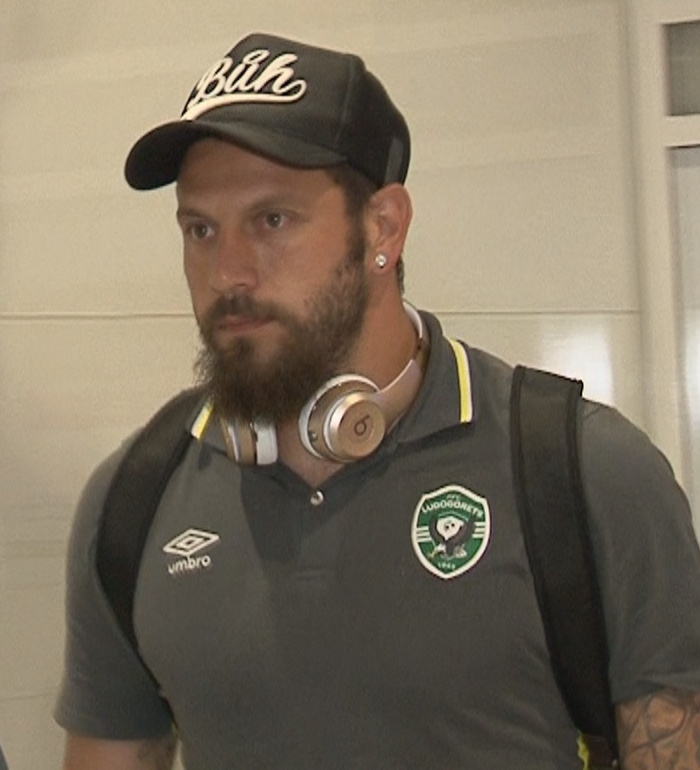
- Broun with Ludogorets Razgrad in 2018

Personal information
- Full name: Jorge Emanuel Broun
- Date of birth: May 23, 1986 (age 40)
- Place of birth: Rosario, Argentina
- Height: 1.90 m (6 ft 3 in)
- Position: Goalkeeper

Team information
- Current team: Universidad de Concepción

Youth career
- Rosario Central

Senior career*
Years	Team	Apps	(Gls)
2005–2016	Rosario Central	104	(1)
2013–2014	→ Deportes Antofagasta (loan)	23	(0)
2014–2015	→ Colón (loan)	52	(0)
2016–2017	Colón	45	(0)
2017–2019	Ludogorets Razgrad	24	(0)
2020–2021	Gimnasia La Plata	18	(0)
2021–2026	Rosario Central	149	(0)
2026–	Universidad de Concepción	0	(0)
- * Club domestic league appearances and goals as of 16:56, 10 July 2026 (UTC)

Jorge Emanuel "Fatu" Broun (born 23 May 1986) is an Argentine professional footballer who plays as a goalkeeper for Chilean club Universidad de Concepción.

== Career ==
=== Rosario Central ===
Born in Rosario, Broun began his career at Rosario Central. He made his debut in Torneo Clausura 2006 in a match that Rosario Central lost 2–0 against Club Atlético Banfield. He became the first choice keeper after the sale of Cristian Darío Álvarez at RCD Espanyol in 2008. He is the only goalkeeper in the history of Rosario Central that has scored a goal. On 23 October 2009, Broun converted a penalty kick against Independiente.

Broun spent the 2013–14 season on loan with Chilean Primera División club Antofagasta.

=== Colón ===
In July 2014, Broun joined Club Atlético Colón on loan, with whom won promotion to Argentine Primera División. In January 2016, he signed for the club permanently. Broun spent in general four seasons at Estadio B.G. Estanislao López, making 97 league appearances.

=== Ludogorets ===
On 30 June 2017, Broun signed with Bulgarian First League champions Ludogorets Razgrad. He made his debut for the club on 19 July 2017 in a 4–1 Champions League second qualifying round second-leg win over Žalgiris.

On 13 December 2019, Broun left Ludogorets Razgrad by mutual consent.

=== Universidad de Concepción ===
On 21 July 2026, Broun moved to Chile and signed with Universidad de Concepción on a deal for one and a half year.

== Honours ==
Ludogorets

- Bulgarian First League (2): 2017–18, 2018–19
- Bulgarian Supercup (2): 2018, 2019

Rosario Central

- Primera B Nacional: 2012-13
- Copa de la Liga Profesional: 2023
- Primera División: 2025 Liga
