= Los Sauces River, Argentina =

Los Sauces
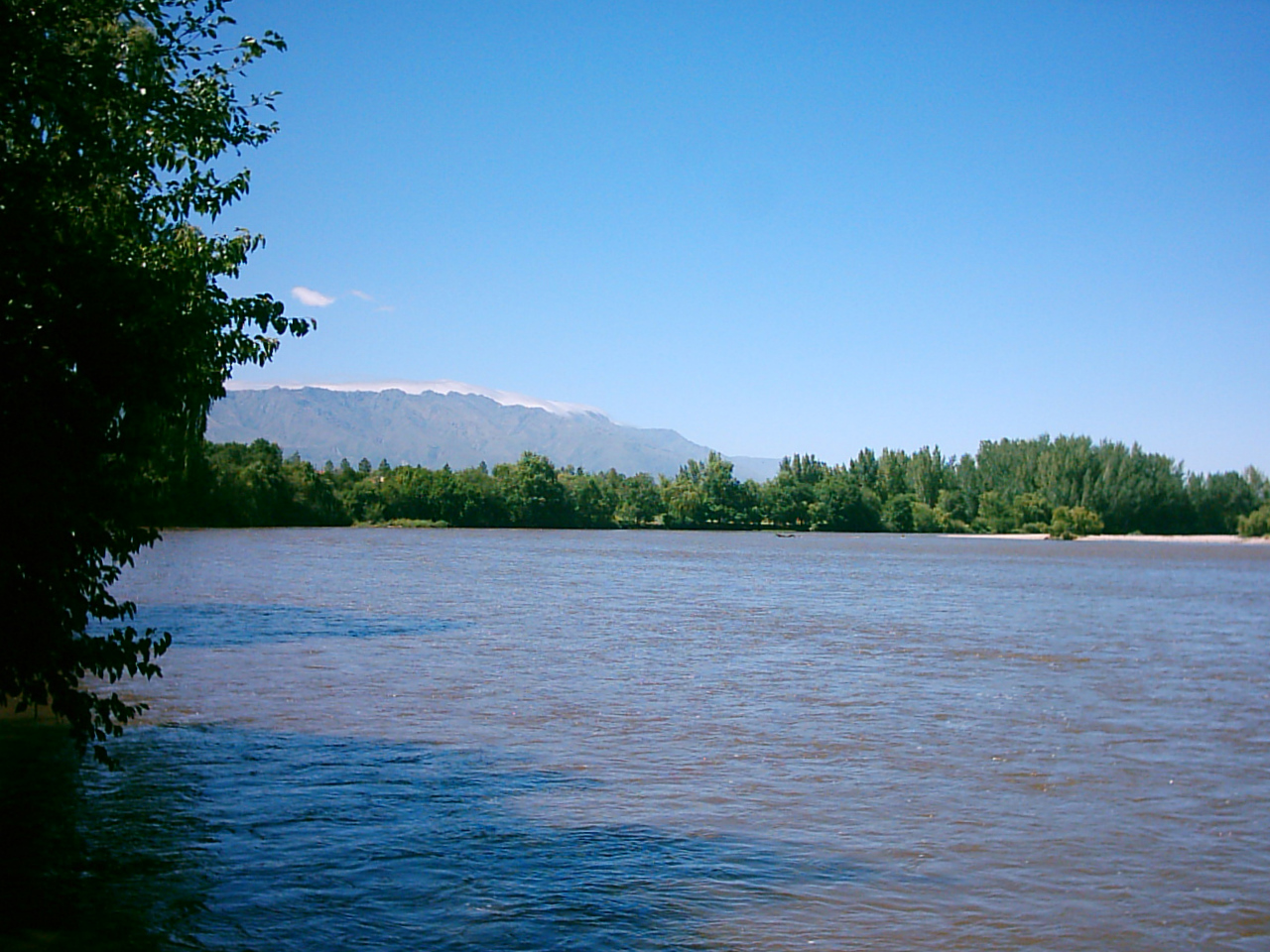
- Los Sauces River in Mina Clavero

Location
- Regions: Mina Clavero, Nono, Argentina, La Viña Dam, Villa Dolores

Physical characteristics
- Source: Confluence of Panaholma and Mina Clavero rivers
  - location: Mina Clavero
  - coordinates: 31°43′09″S 65°00′24″W
  - elevation: 900 m (3,000 ft)
- 2nd source: Cura Brochero
- Mouth: La Viña Dam
  - coordinates: 31°49′25″S 65°01′01″W
  - elevation: 848 m (2,782 ft)
- Length: 26 km (16 mi)
- Width
  - average: 5–40 m (16–131 ft)
- Discharge
  - location: La Viña Dam

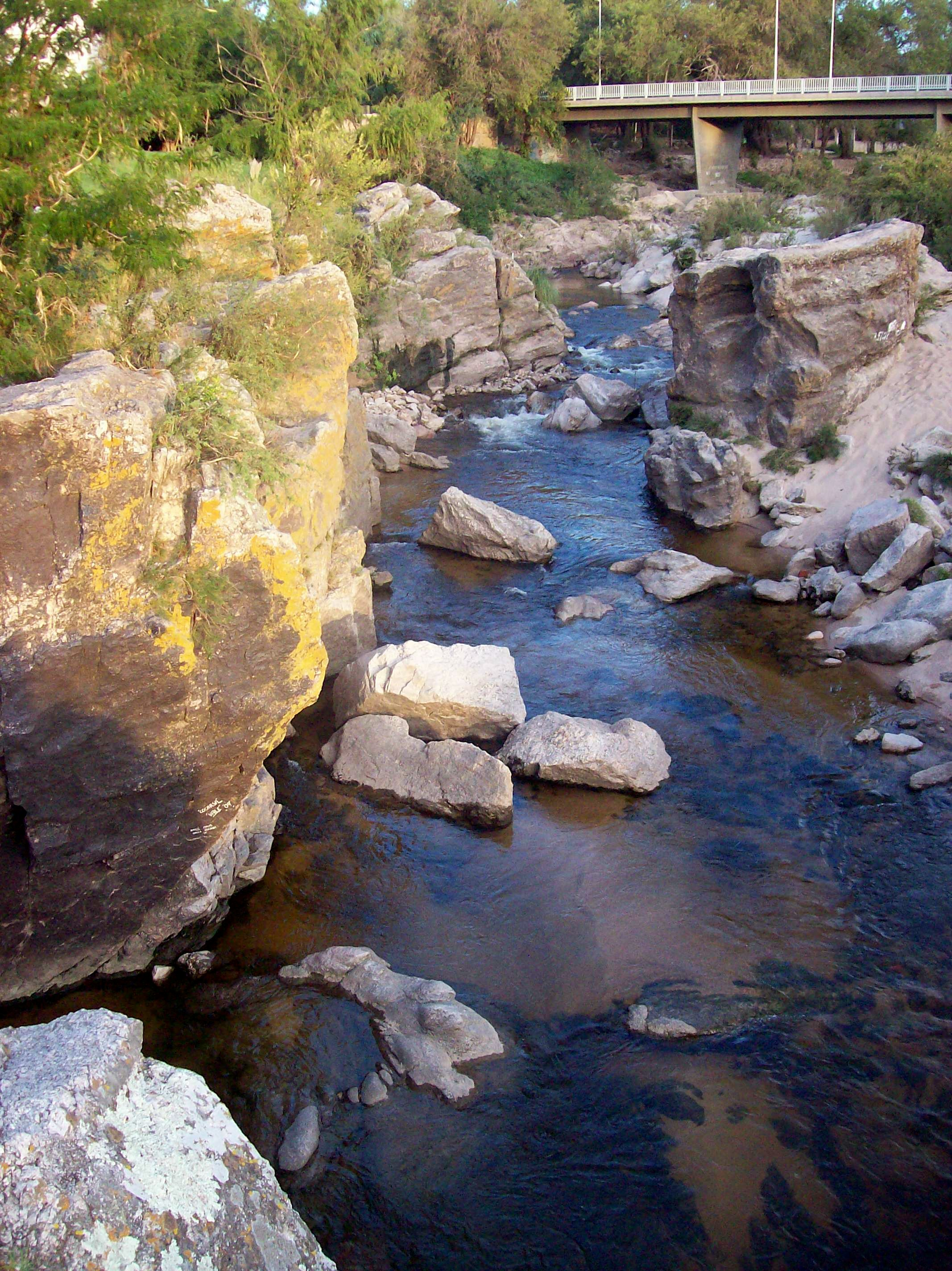
Confluence of the rivers Mina Clavero and Panaholma

The Los Sauces River is a natural watercourse of the Traslasierra valley in the Córdoba Province of Argentina, originated in the limit of Mina Clavero with Cura Brochero, from the confluence of the river Mina Clavero with Panaholma. It is the second most important channel in the valley.

In the junction area where the river is born, the channel is sandwiched between large rocks of attractive shapes known as "Los Cajones" (The Drawers); and a few meters ahead is the natural spa "Los Elefantes" (The Elephants), since the ancient eroded rocks remind us of herds of elephants drinking in the river. The river then continues more calmly, forming extensive golden sand beaches.

About 20 km later, the channel receives the waters of the Río Chico de Nono, to end up later at the lake of La Viña Dam or "Ing. A. Medina Allende Reservoir", whose wall is 106 m high. There it is possible to practice nautical sports and fishing.
