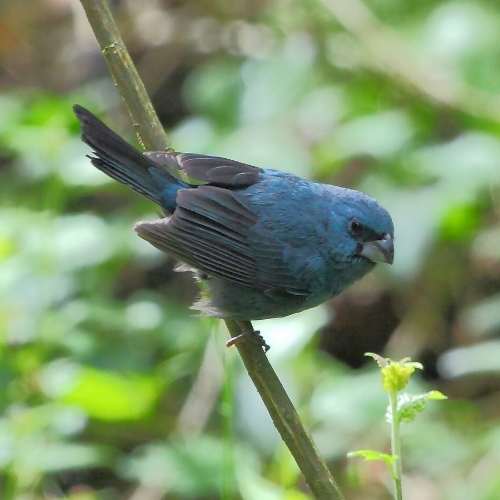
- male at Iporanga, São Paulo State, Brazil

Conservation status
- Least Concern (IUCN 3.1)

Scientific classification
- Kingdom: Animalia
- Phylum: Chordata
- Class: Aves
- Order: Passeriformes
- Family: Cardinalidae
- Genus: Cyanoloxia
- Species: C. glaucocaerulea

Binomial name
- Cyanoloxia glaucocaerulea (D'Orbigny & Lafresnaye, 1837)
- Non-breeding Year-round

Synonyms
- Passerina glaucocaerulea (D'Orbigny & Lafresnaye, 1837)

= Glaucous-blue grosbeak =

Species of bird

The glaucous-blue grosbeak (Cyanoloxia glaucocaerulea), also known as the indigo grosbeak, is a species of bird in the family Cardinalidae, the cardinals or cardinal grosbeaks. It is found in Brazil, Argentina, Paraguay, and Uruguay.

== Taxonomy and systematics ==
The glaucous-blue grosbeak is monotypic.

For much of its history, the glaucous-blue grosbeak was the only member of genus Cyanoloxia. Following a 2004 publication, the blue-black grosbeak (now Cyanoloxia cyanoides) and ultramarine grosbeak (now Cyanoloxia brissonii) were moved from genus Cyanocompsa. What is now Amazonian grosbeak (Cyanoloxia cyanoides) was later split from blue-black grosbeak.

== Description ==
The glaucous-blue grosbeak is approximately 14 cm (5.5 in) long. Three birds weighed from 16 to 19.5 g (0.56 to 0.69 oz). The male is generally dark sky blue that is lighter on the forehead and rump and is grayish on the lower belly. It has a small black "mask". The female is brown overall, warm and dark above and orange-tinged below. The immature is orange-brown that is darker on the back, and it has a hint of blue on the forehead and cheek.

== Distribution and habitat ==
The glaucous-blue grosbeak nests in northeastern Argentina, southeastern Brazil, and much of Uruguay. During the austral winter, some move into southeastern Paraguay and further north in Brazil. It inhabits low, somewhat dense, vegetation such as along forest edges, on river islands, in marshes, and in secondary forest. In elevation it ranges from near sea level to 1,700 m (5,600 ft) in Brazil.

== Behavior ==
=== Feeding ===
The glaucous-blue grosbeak is known to forage in pairs but other details and its diet have not been published.

=== Breeding ===
The glaucous-blue grosbeak's breeding phenology has only been documented in Uruguay. There it nests from October to December. Two to four eggs are laid in a cup nest of twigs placed in dense vegetation.

=== Vocalization ===
The glaucous-blue grosbeak usually sings from dense cover, "a fast, high, hurried jumbled warbling" . Its call is "psit" or "jit" .

== Status ==
The IUCN has assessed the glaucous-blue grosbeak as being of Least Concern. However, it is "[g]enerally rather rare to uncommon over much of [its] range" and is poorly known.
