= San Lorenzo (Córdoba, Argentina) =

Touristic location in Córdoba, Argentina

San Lorenzo is a commune in the San Alberto department, in the province of Córdoba (Argentina) in the Traslasierra Valley. It is situated between the mountain ranges of Sierras Grandes, Sierras de Pocho, Guasapampa, and Serrezuela, 2 km north of Villa Cura Brochero, a well-known tourist location in the area. The Panaholma River and the Toro Muerto Creek flow through this commune.

== Demographics ==
According to the 2010 census, there are 1029 people residing in this area, which follows Argentinian law no. 8102 grants it the status of "commune". However, it must be noticed that in the recent elections, the number of people eligible to vote (those over 16) was 1050. When the next census results are available, it is possible that San Lorenzo will become a municipality.

== First inhabitants ==
The Spanish conquerors entered the territory of Córdoba through three rounds of expeditions starting in the first half of the 16th century. As a result of these expeditions, San Lorenzo possesses precious records of the customs of the native indigenous people, such as chronicles and data provided by archaeologists, among others. According to these data, it is possible to know that groups of Sanavirones and Comechingones, native indigenous people, settled in the region.

The area that the Comechingones from the north of Cordoba and part of San Luis occupied extended around 72,000 kilometers. The Henia and the Camiare, two substantial tribal groups, settled in northern and southern regions of this area. These people cooperatively managed vital resources for their economic survival, including areas for hunting, carob groves, and agricultural land. While preserving high levels of political and economic autonomy, these social groups could either remain politically independent or integrate into larger formations. All these characteristics define the segmented structure of Andean social structures.

Regarding their economic activities, they worked as farmers. Llama raising and fruit gathering were other economic activities that determined the locations of their settlements. They used artificial irrigation, and received meat and wool for their textiles due to the domestication of the llama. Additionally, they produced pottery, hampers, and hunt for deer, guanacos, pumas, and birds.

In relation to these tribe's art, an exhibition of great sensitivity is expressed through the rock sculptures, cave figures and clay or stone statuettes. Animal-themed clay sculptures and certain stone plaques with geometric engravings are also part of their artistic expressions.

== Wildlife and vegetation ==
Species of the Fabaceae family are dominant. Prosopis, such as Prosopis alba, Prosopis chilensis, Prosopis torquata, Prosopis flexuosa and mostly Prosopis nigra. In addition, species from the Acacieae tribe are abundant, such as Vachellia astringes, Parasenegalia visco, Vachelia aroma, Senegalia praecox, Senegalia gilliesii and mostly Vachelia caven, the "espinillo". In addition, Ramnáceas, Nictagináceas, Zigofiláceas, Anacardiaceae, Asteraceae, Ephedraceae, Cactáceas, Solanáceas, etc. also predominant.

Pumas, foxes, skunks, cruises, ferrets, weasels (possums), vizcachas, tarucas, or sacha goats (corzuela) are the most representative mammals in these ecoregions' fauna. Among the frogs, it is worth mentioning the mountain toad (small, jet-coloured with intense orange spots), the bramble frog, the escuerzo and the ox toad. Yararás and coral vipers were among the snakes that existed in the area before the 20th century, but since then, they have been practically exterminated in the area, gradually leaving in their place non-venomous snakes that resemble them (such the false yarará and false coral, for example).

Due to the wide variety and abundance of birds, birdwatching is one of the tourist attractions. The most common ones are burrowing parrots, cardinals, plush-crested jays, peregrine falcons, shielded eagles, little hawks, ringdoves, various species of ducks, thrushes, harriers, hooded siskins, ultramarine grosbeaks, black-backed grosbeaks, great kiskadees, owls, thrushes, many-colored rush tyrants, striped cuckoos, partridges, among others. Rheas, however, are no longer seen in their natural environment. Every passing year, there are more condor sightings, which makes it simpler to spot vultures in their two species—black and turkey.

=== Natural reserve ===
On Wednesday, February 15, 2023, the inauguration of the "Reserva Natural Periurbana Arroyo San Lorenzo" took place and educational signs and advertising with an augmented reality experience were presented. The reserve, which spans 6 hectares and is representative of a small area of mountain woodland, is situated where the San Lorenzo Stream meets the Panaholma River. Even in relation with urban and rural natural spaces, protected natural areas define a space rich in species, habitats, biological communities, and landscapes, making it feasible to preserve a natural space indefinitely. This is Traslasierra Valley's first reserve with augmented reality technology (AR), and it has 12 signs from which to appreciate some of the animals found in the reserve.

== Tourism ==
In recent years, the productive and demographic profile of the town has been changing to the rhythm of the growing tourist offer. Brick kilns and dairy farms have been replaced by numerous complexes of cabins, inns, recreational and bathing resorts:

The Panaholma River stands out in the landscape, which runs from north to south through the whole town. In addition, the Toro Muerto stream, where a series of bathing resorts are located, such as Cueva del Indio, El Álamo and La Quebrada. The Costanera Sur, the descent by the Chapel of the Niño Jesús and the place Las Maravillas are other points of contact with the river that offer wide beaches, rocky areas, ravines, deep pans, and further north, a waterfall.

Hiking is the activity of greater growth in the last times, and San Lorenzo participates in the Hiking Month enevnt of the province of Cordoba, with circuits that combine the contact with river, creek, archaeological sites and natural monuments like the "stone bridge" and the "mogote La Hornilla".

Alternative tourism activities such as horseback riding, paragliding, canoeing, hiking, bird watching, etc. are also available.
