= Museo Rocsen =

Museum in Nono, Córdoba, Argentina

Coordinates: 31.7992°S 64.9564°W

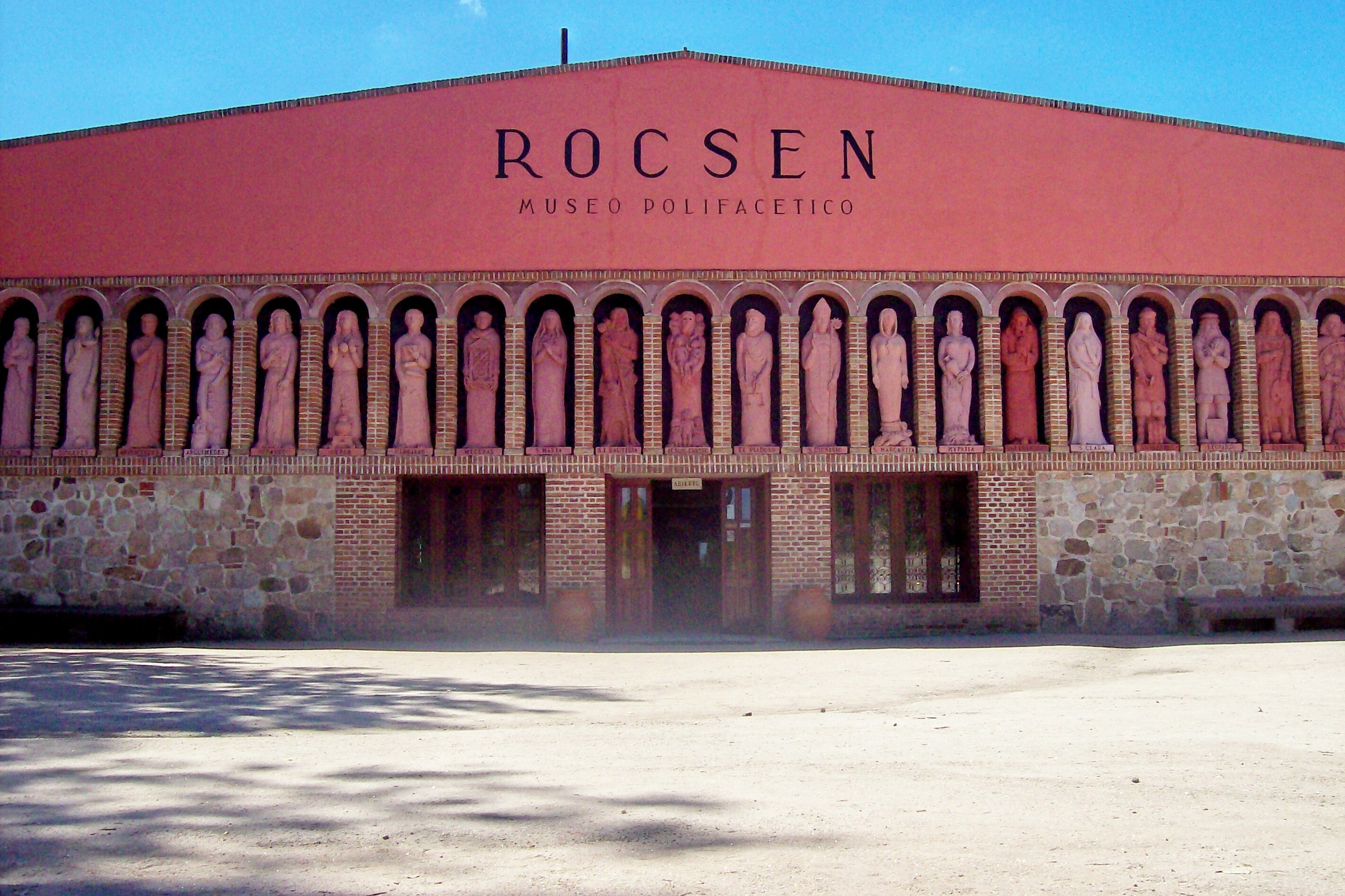
Facade of the Museum.

The Rocsen Museum (Spanish: Museo Rocsen) is a museum located in Nono, Córdoba Province, Argentina, 8 km from Mina Clavero. It was established in 1969 and features a "multifaceted" collection of over 18,000 pieces, with natural history, archaeological and decorative objects from all around the world.
