= Los Remansos =

Los Remansos is a natural spa situated through the river Río Chico de Nono localicated to 3 km of Nono center. Is one of the most famous of tourism places.

== Characteristics ==
The place is formed with the crossing of the stream "El Sanjuanino" to the Rio Chico, with warm water and natural pots. It is a place cited by local newspapers as one of the most recommended to rest.

== See also ==
- Nono
- Traslasierra
