= Río Chico de Nono =

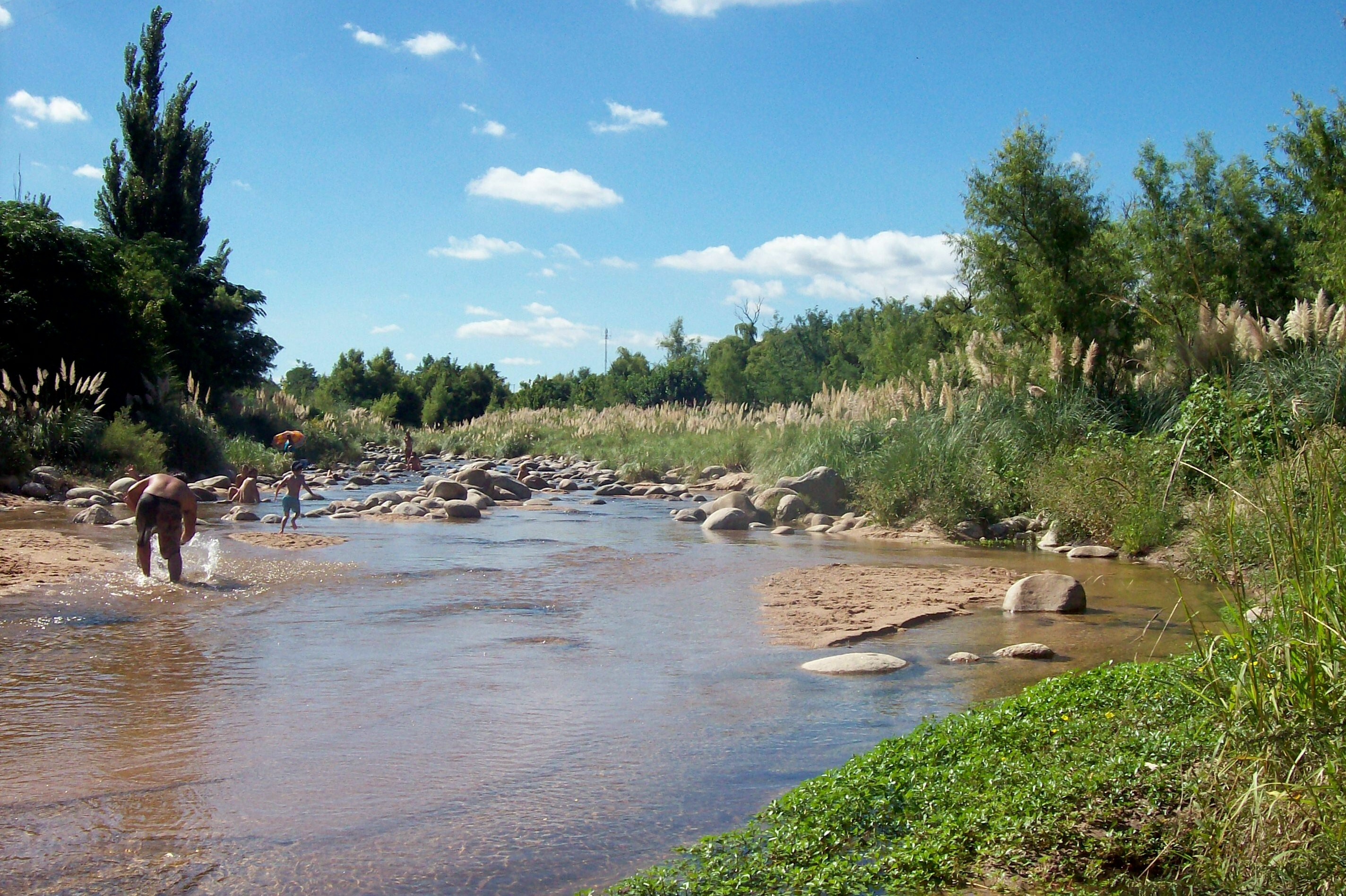
- Part of Paso de las Tropas natural spa

Location
- Country: Argentina
- Province: Córdoba
- Locality: Nono

Physical characteristics
- Source
  - location: Pampa de Achala
  - elevation: 2,300 metres (7,500 ft)
- Mouth: Río de los Sauces
  - coordinates: 31°48′25″S 65°01′28″W
  - elevation: 900 metres (3,000 ft)
- Length: 30 km (19 mi)

The Río Chico de Nono is a stream in the Traslasierra Valley, Province of Córdoba, Argentina. The natural spas of Los Remansos and Paso de las Tropas are located along the river.

== See also ==
- Nono, Argentina
