= San Alberto Department =

San Alberto Department Departamento San Alberto
- Department
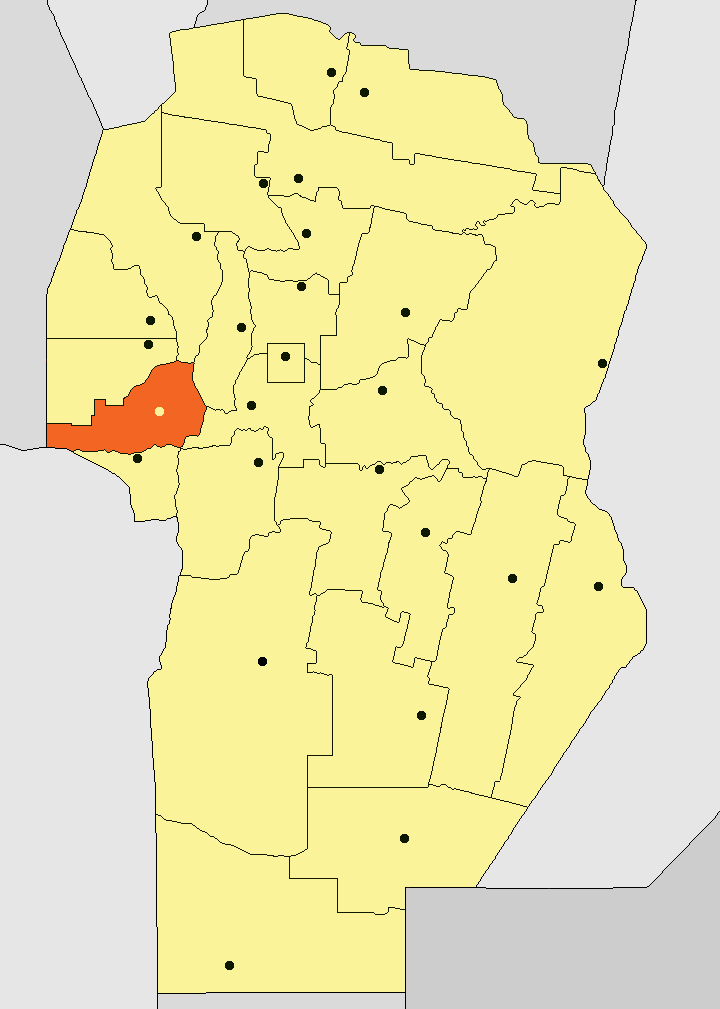
- Location of San Alberto Department in Córdoba Province
- Coordinates: 31°40′S 65°01′W
- Country: Argentina
- Province: Córdoba
- Foundation: December 1858
- Capital: Villa Cura Brochero

Area
  - Total: 3,327 km^{2} (1,285 sq mi)

Population (2001 census [INDEC])
  - Total: 32,395
  - Density: 9.737/km^{2} (25.22/sq mi)
  - Pop. change (1991-2001): +29.04%
- Time zone: UTC-3 (ART)
- Postal code: X5891
- Dialing code: 03544
- Distances to
- Buenos Aires: 716 km (445 mi)
- Córdoba: 186 km (116 mi)

San Alberto Department is a department of Córdoba Province, Argentina. It is composed by many municipalities and communes. Its main industry is tourism and it is visited by many people each summer. San Alberto includes cities and towns as Mina Clavero, Villa Cura Brochero and Nono.

== Settlements ==
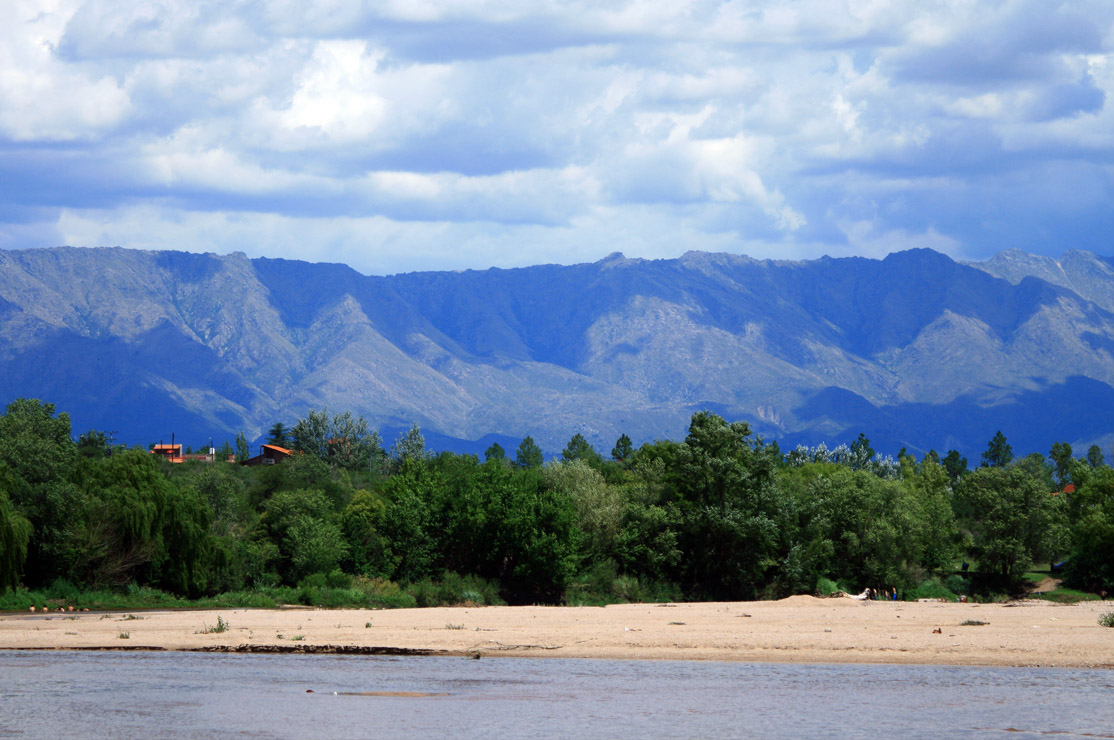
Mina Clavero

- Ámbul
- Arroyo de Los Patos
- Las Calles
- Las Rabonas
- Mina Clavero
- Nono
- Panaholma
- San Lorenzo
- San Pedro
- San Vicente
- Sauce Arriba
- Villa Cura Brochero
- Villa Sarmiento
