= Paso de las Tropas =

Paso de las Tropas is a natural spa situated in the locality of Nono in Traslasierra valley, Córdoba, Argentina. It runs along the river called Rio Chico, to 6 km from Nono center.

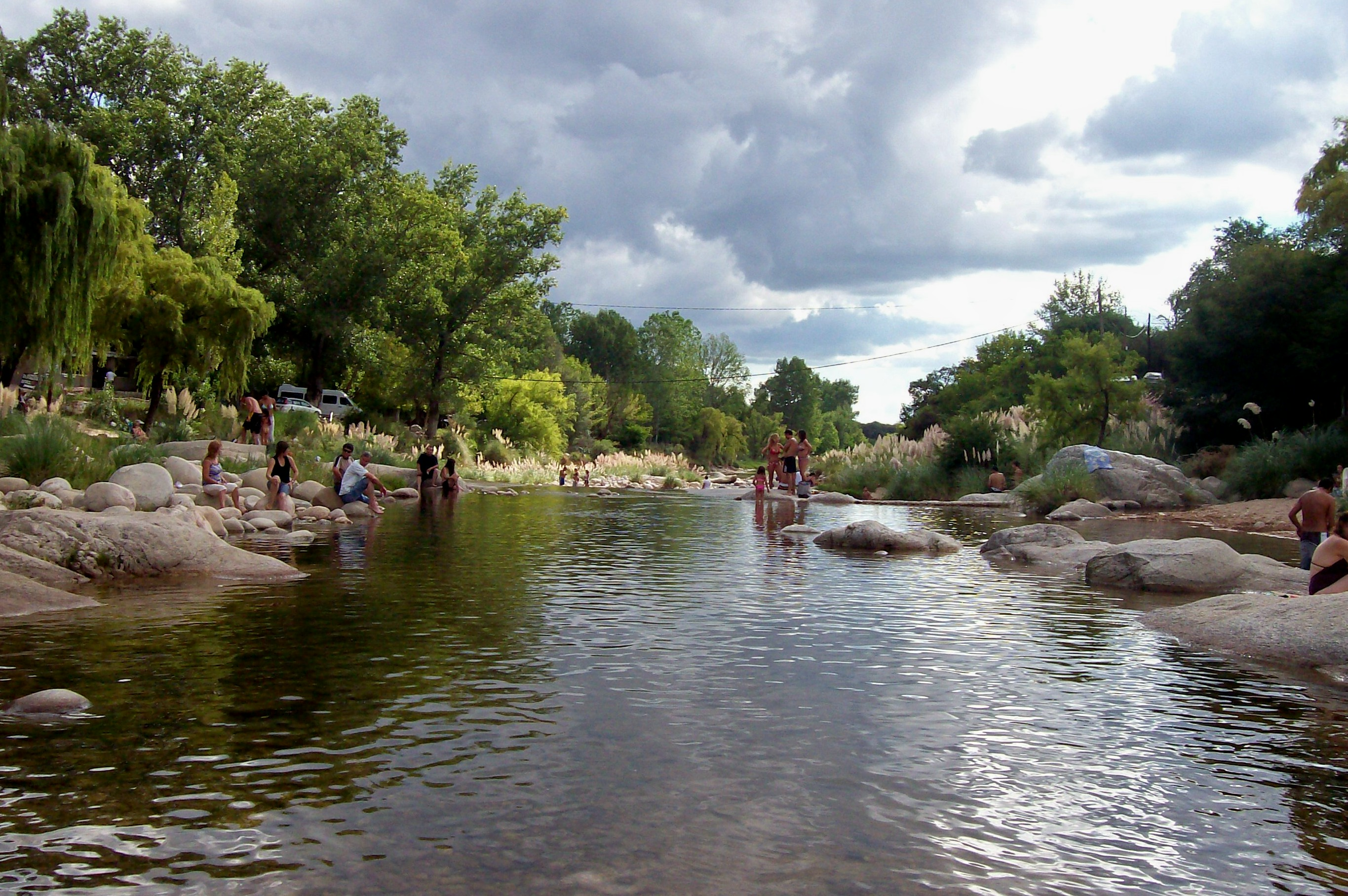
Paso de las Tropas spa

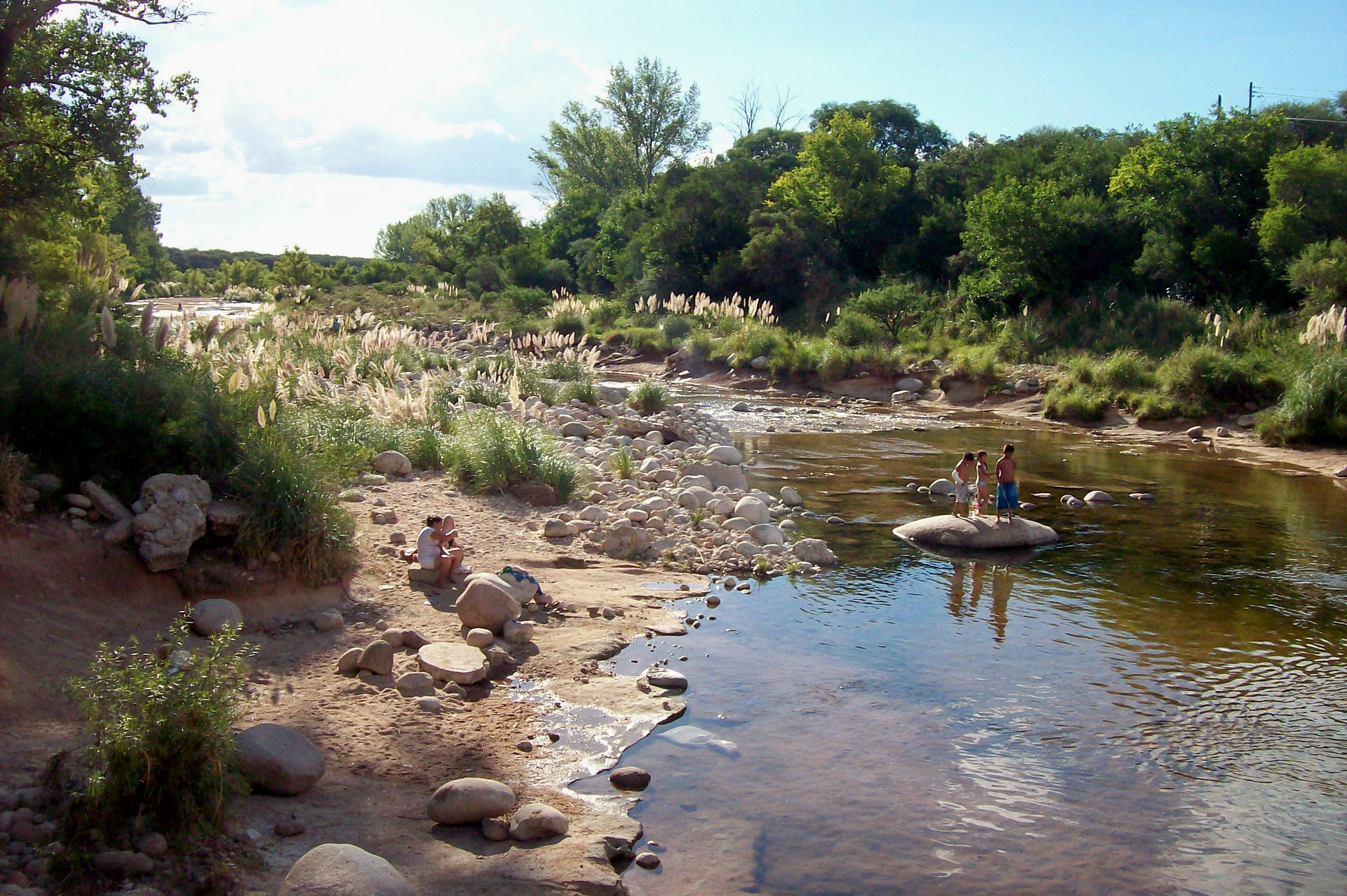
capturing its tropical environment

== Environment and attractions ==
The camping offers toilets, grills, restaurants and parking lots with abundant foliage and shade. Tourists mainly attend in summer, where temperatures are usually high, and street vendors pass by. The natural spa has shallow pots, beaches and rocks where people rest or jump into the water. You can also do activities such as fishing for small prey such as torrent catfish, flatfish, trout, mojarritas, silversides and perches; people usually play hopscotch, trekking, horseback riding or 4x4 adventure tourism.

== A part of the Argentina history ==
It is so called because General Bustos's troops passed through there in his crusade against General Paz, In one of three battlefront of the Unitarian invasion to federal "traslaserranos", the West resistance of Córdoba, in Civil Wars of 1829, the military attack called Campaign of the Sierra.

== See also ==
- Nono, Argentina
- Traslasierra
