= Nono, Córdoba =

Coordinates: 31.766778°S 64.99898°W

Nono is a municipality in the Province of Córdoba, Argentina located 150 km west of the provincial capital. And it is also part of Traslasierra valley.

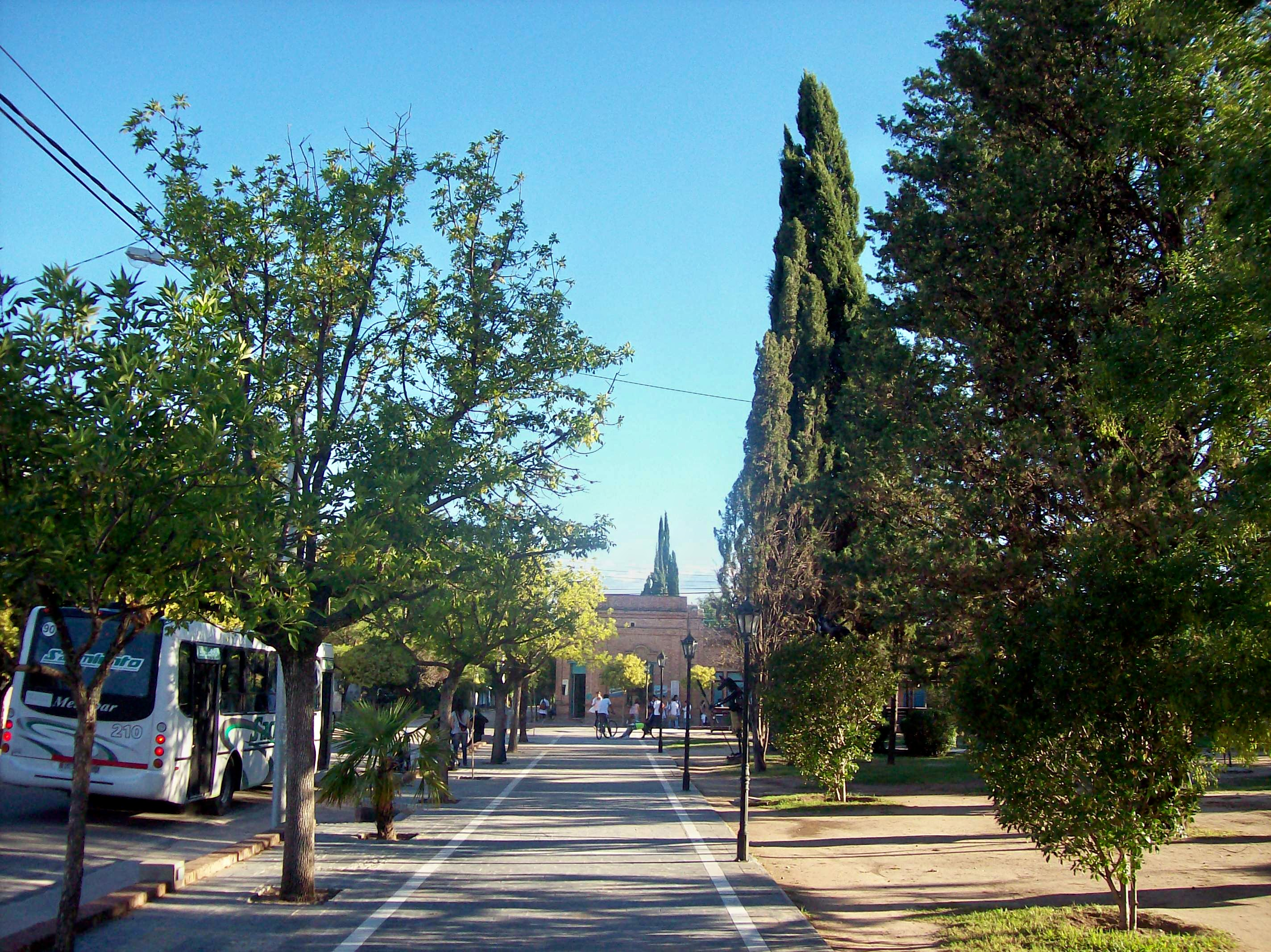
The street Vicente Castro in the central square I gave Nono.

It features the Museo Rocsen, a self-styled "multifaceted collection".

== Tourism and Attractions ==
Tourism is one of the activities that highlight the town, among which are:

- Sierras Grandes of the Comechingones and Sierras de Achala, where you can do trekking, horseback riding and mountain biking;
- Dique La Viña, a limpid mirror of water that offers the possibility of practicing water sports as well as sport fishing for silverside and trout and, in its ancient and artisan surroundings, figures and pieces of black pottery;
- Rocsen Museum;
- Champaquí Hill;
- Los Remansos Spa;
- Paso de las Tropas Spa;
- Río Chico de Nono;
- Los Sauces River, Córdoba;
- Los Algarrobos Spot.
