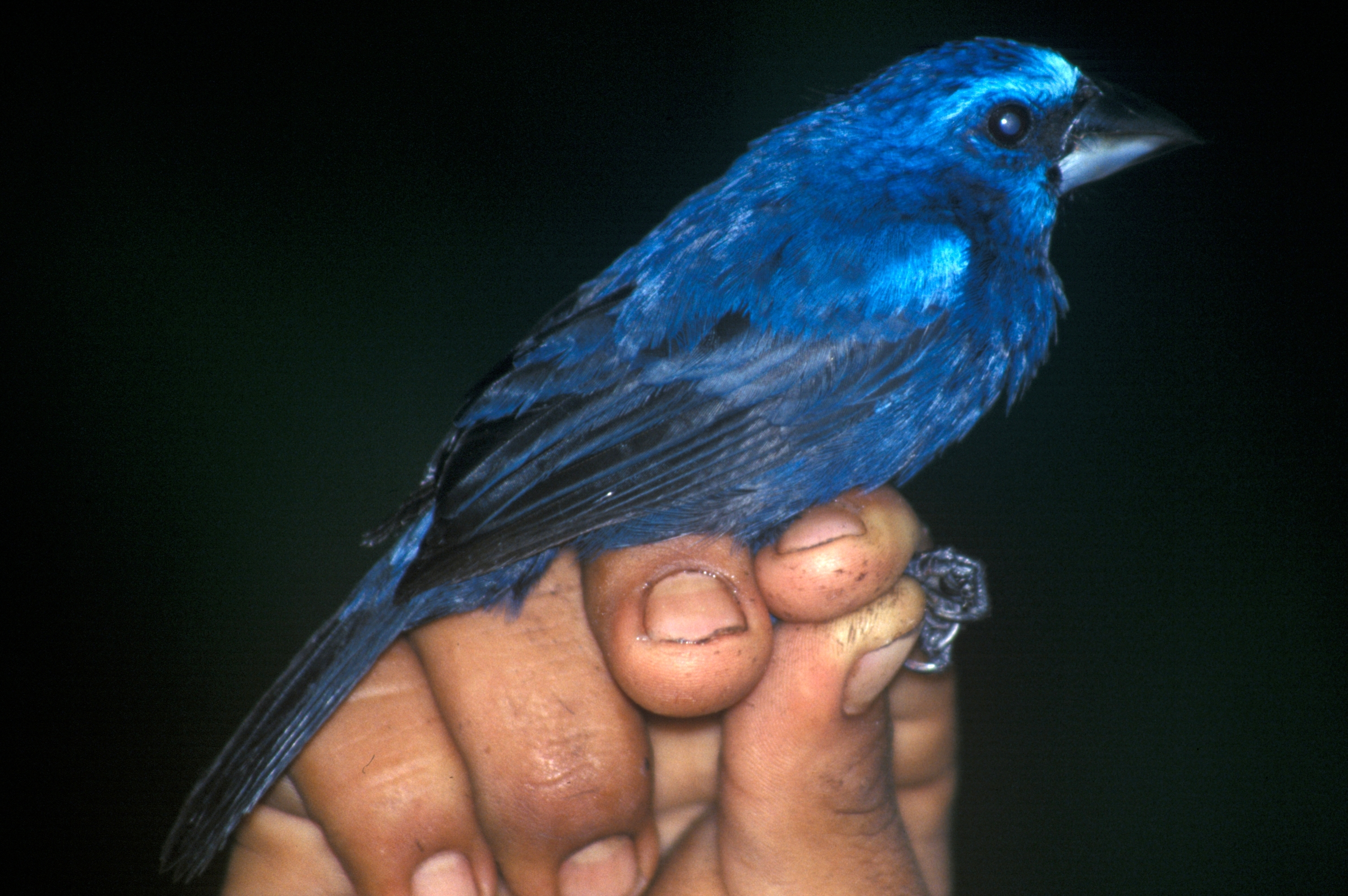
- Blue-black grosbeak (Cyanoloxia cyanoides)

Scientific classification
- Kingdom: Animalia
- Phylum: Chordata
- Class: Aves
- Order: Passeriformes
- Family: Cardinalidae
- Genus: Cyanoloxia; Bonaparte, 1850

Type species
- Pyrrhula glaucocaerulea D'Orbigny & Lafresnaye, 1837

= Cyanoloxia =

Genus of birds

Cyanoloxia is a genus of grosbeak in the family Cardinalidae.

== Species ==
It contains the following species:

Genus Cyanoloxia – Bonaparte, 1850 – four species
Common name	Scientific name and subspecies	Range	Size and ecology	IUCN status and estimated population
Glaucous-blue grosbeak Male Female	Cyanoloxia glaucocaerulea (D'Orbigny & Lafresnaye, 1837)	Argentina, Brazil, and Uruguay.	Size: Habitat: Diet:	LC
Ultramarine grosbeak Male Female	Cyanoloxia brissonii (Lichtenstein, MHC, 1823)	Northeast and central Brazil, Bolivia, Paraguay to Argentina	Size: Habitat: Diet:	LC
Amazonian grosbeak	Cyanoloxia rothschildii (Bartlett, E, 1890)	western Amazonia	Size: Habitat: Diet:	LC
Blue-black grosbeak Male Female	Cyanoloxia cyanoides (Lafresnaye, 1847)	Belize, Bolivia, Brazil, Colombia, Costa Rica, Ecuador, French Guiana, Guatemala, Guyana, Honduras, Mexico, Nicaragua, Panama, Peru, Suriname, and Venezuela	Size: Habitat: Diet:	LC
