= La Viña Dam =

Dam in San Alberto Department, Córdoba, Argentina

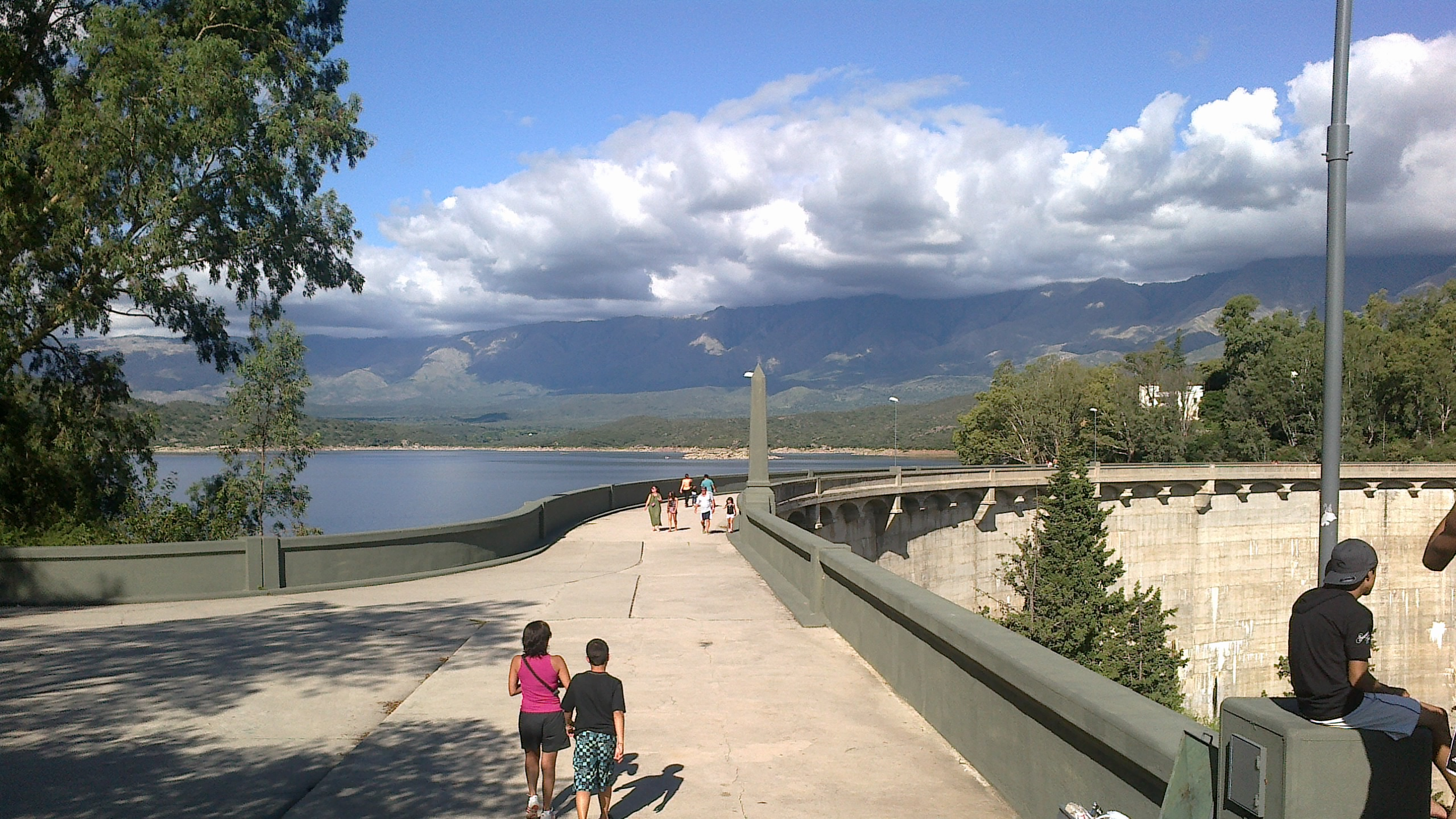
- Dam on right, reservoir in background

- Location within Argentina
- Official name: Antonio Medina Allende Dam
- Country: Argentina
- Location: San Alberto Department, Córdoba Province
- Coordinates: 31°52′14.33″S 65°2′6.41″W
- Purpose: Power,
- Status: Operational
- Construction began: 1938
- Opening date: 1944; 82 years ago
- Owner: Empresa Provincial de Energia de Cordoba (EPEC)

Dam and spillways
- Type of dam: Arch
- Impounds: Los Sauces River
- Height: 106 m (348 ft)
- Length: 317.27 m (1,040.9 ft)
- Width (crest): 4 m (13 ft)
- Width (base): 35 m (115 ft)

Power Station
- Commission date: 1959
- Turbines: 2 x 8 MW (11,000 hp) Francis-type
- Installed capacity: 16 MW (21,000 hp)

The La Viña Dam, officially known as the Antonio Medina Allende Dam, is an arch dam on the Los Sauces River in San Alberto Department of Córdoba Province, Argentina. Construction on the dam began in 1938 and it was completed in 1944. The 16 MW (21,000 hp) power station was later connected to the grid on 28 February 1959. Aside from generating hydroelectric power, water stored by the dam is used to irrigate around 24,000 ha (59,000 acres) of farmland.
