= Mina Clavero =

- Department
- Flag
- Interactive map of Mina Clavero
- Coordinates: 31°43′26″S 65°00′18″W

Government
  - Intendant: Luis Quiroga
- Time zone: UTC−3 (ART)
- Postal code: 5889
- Dialing code: 03544
- Website: https://www.minaclavero.gov.ar

Mina Clavero is a municipality in San Alberto Department in Córdoba Province, Argentina. It forms the municipality of same name and is the tourist center of Traslasierra valley. It is characterized by its natural landscapes, beaches and nightlife.

In 2019, in a contest organized by the New 7 Wonders Foundation, the Mina Clavero river was chosen as one of the “seven natural wonders of Argentina".

== History ==
After the city of Córdoba's foundation, in 1573, an expedition took place under the command of Captain Hernán Mejía de Mirabal, who with forty soldiers arrived in the region with the purpose of surveying populations and wealth, especially mining.

At that time the area was inhabited by the Comechingones, whose populations were subdivided into partialities that functioned independently; each under the command of a cacique. Milac Navira was the cacique of the clan that inhabited the place where Mina Clavero is today, and to whom the city apparently owes its name. However, historians do not agree on the origin of the name: on one hand they say it is because of Comechingón chief, but on the other hand it may have come from the Mina de Clavero derivation, since there was an important mine belonging to Clavero's family, surname that is common in area.

With the first expeditionaries was traveling the Spanish miner Hernando Romero, in charge of taking samples of minerals in the area. Their investigations would make time later, around 1898, the exploitation of some deposits in the territory of the Ticas, in Minas department, promoting the development of the region.

Later, roads and bridges began to be built in commercial exchange favor; followed by arrival of postal mail and telephone. The construction of hotels and the completion of some key public works began to position Mina Clavero as a tourist town.

By 1890 the area was already named for its therapeutic baths, due to the properties of its waters. The population was growing and gradually organizing their community activities.

A certain date is not known about the foundation of Mina Clavero, but it is known that in 1887, the priest José Gabriel Brochero convinced Doña Anastasia Favre de Merlo to install a guest house in this place, which began operating for a few years later.

On May 1, 1928 the municipality was created and the same year, through an indirect election, José María Oviedo Allende became its first mayor. He was succeeded by two commissioned mayors, until in 1932 the first mayor elected by popular will assumes: Daniel Vila.

On October 11, 1946, Doña Anastasia died, and this day is taken as the date of Mina Clavero spiritual foundation.

== Geography and climate ==
Mina Clavero is located in the Traslasierra valley, between the mountain ranges of Achala and Pocho, at 915 meters above sea level.

Mina Clavero's river, with cold and crystalline waters, which flows down from Sierras Grandes, runs through the city and on its own way forms natural seaside resorts with golden beaches. In 2009, different warning systems for sudden floods were installed, since rains are sometimes recorded in the high mountains, at source of river, just 25 km from the city, while remains sunny.

In limits with Villa Cura Brochero, the confluence of this river with Panaholma's one that comes from the north takes place bringing warm waters. Both streams form Río de los Sauces, the most important in the Valley, where it ends in La Viña dam, at 40 km.

In Mina Clavero, the days are typically sunny and the nights are cool, with low percentages of humidity.

The city has a microclimate that makes the average annual temperature 15 °C, and there are 320 sunny days a year. The rainy season is from November to March.

== Attractions and tourism ==
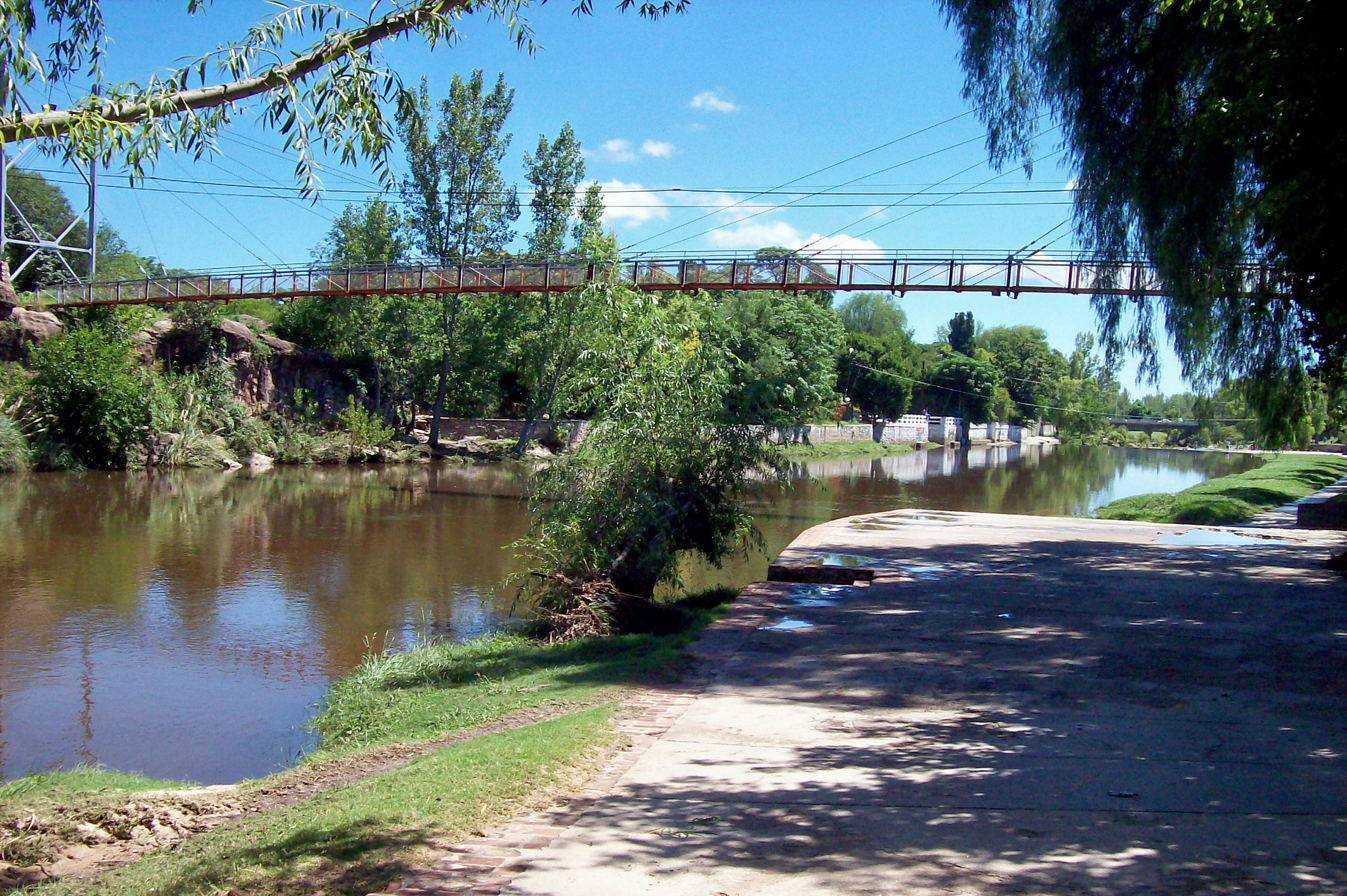
The final course of the Mina Clavero river

The area is popular tourist site with its 14 miles of sandy beach and rocks, small waterfalls, spas and natural river basins. There are also cultural options such as the Museo de las Campanas (with a collection of over 600 bells from around the world) or the minerals museum.

Topography of terrain, and climate of region contribute to making the town a good setting for trekking, horseback riding, ATV excursions and 4x4 crossings on different mountain roads with different levels of difficulty.

A few kilometers from the town it is possible to practice sport climbing and mountain biking, and also to practice sport fishing for trout in crystal clear streams that cross the mountains. Lovers of water sports and activities can ride a jet ski or pedalo along the La Viña dam (35 km south of the city), or during the summer kayak the many rivers in the area. Abseiling is also practiced in the Quebrada de San Lorenzo and paragliding in Río Los Sauces and Baño de los Dioses.

Throughout the year it is possible to watch birds, especially in the Quebrada del Condorito National Park (in it, one can see a gigantic "V", about 800 meters deep and 1500 meters apart from the top of its walls), Paraje Río Los Sauces, Cerro San José, La Palmita, Remanso Cuadrado, Quebrada del Sobrado and Quebrada de la Mermela (Los Túneles).

Mina Clavero has a tourist infrastructure that includes three, two and one star hotels, lodges and inns, and it also has hostels, cabins, camping and houses for rent (there are two tourist places for each inhabitant). Accompanying the above is a gastronomic offer and options when it comes to having fun: casino, bingo, theatrical and street shows, among others.

The Nido del Águila spa is a popular tourist area.

The area is used as a special stage for the Rally Argentina.

In 2019 the Mina Clavero river was chosen as one of the "seven natural wonders of Argentina" within the framework of a selection process that involved both popular vote and experts preselection, in a contest organized by the New 7 Wonders Foundation.

== Prominent personalities ==
- Tadeo Allende: footballer (born 1999), winger on loan from Celta de Vigo to Inter Miami CF for the 2025 season (#21)
- Jorge Raúl Recalde: rally driver (1951–2001)

== Transport connections ==
- From Córdoba Capital it is accessed by the national route 20 "Camino de las Altas Cumbres".
- From Cruz del Eje along Provincial Route 15
- From Villa Dolores along Provincial Route 14
