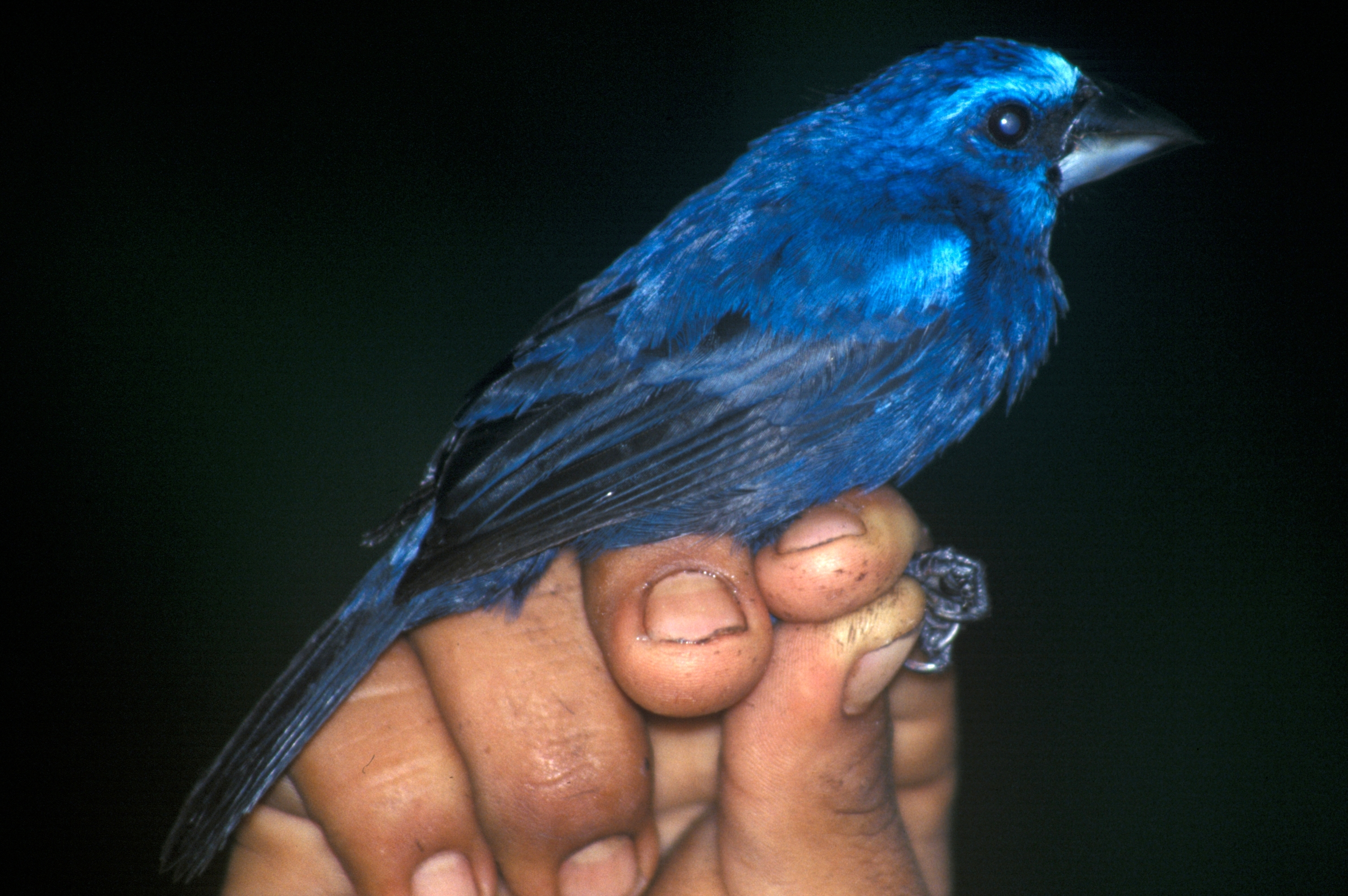

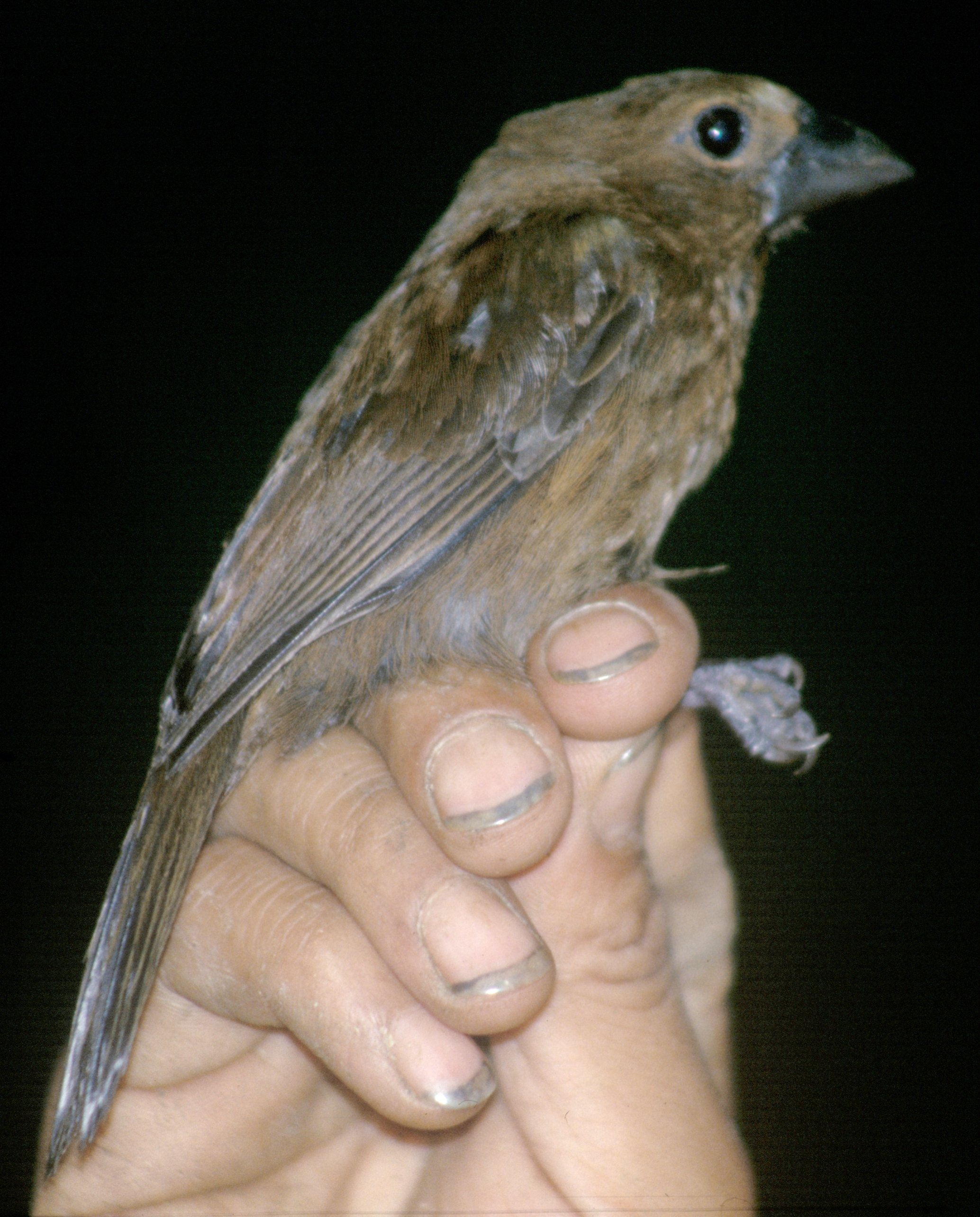
- Male (above) and female (below)

Conservation status
- Least Concern (IUCN 3.1)

Scientific classification
- Kingdom: Animalia
- Phylum: Chordata
- Class: Aves
- Order: Passeriformes
- Family: Cardinalidae
- Genus: Cyanoloxia
- Species: C. cyanoides

Binomial name
- Cyanoloxia cyanoides (Lafresnaye, 1847)

Synonyms
- Cyanoloxia cyanoides

= Blue-black grosbeak =

Species of songbird

The blue-black grosbeak (Cyanoloxia cyanoides) is a species of songbird in the family Cardinalidae.

The South American Classification Committee of the American Ornithological Society places this species in genus Cyanoloxia. In addition, in 2018 the committee split the eastern lowland population into a new species, the Amazonian grosbeak (Cyanoloxia rothschildii).

== Taxonomy and systematics ==
The blue-black grosbeak is found in the family Cardinalidae, within the order Passeriformes. Although it is still sometimes placed in the genus Cyanocompsa, it was found that this genus is paraphyletic and contains members of the genus Amaurospiza and Cyanoloxia.

There are three subspecies in this taxa: Cyanoloxia cyanoides cyanoides, Cyanoloxia cyanoides caerulescens, and Cyanoloxia cyanoides concreta. Although these three subspecies are very similar, there are slight differences between them. Males all have dark blue plumage, however, C.c. concreta has the darkest of the three and is also the largest. Next, in terms of size and coloration, is C.c. caerulescens, followed by C.c. cyanoides, which has the smallest size and brightest plumage.

Originally there was a fourth subspecies, C.c. rothschildii, the only subspecies found to the east of the Andes. However, after examining the genetics of this subspecies, it was determined that C.c. rothschildii would be considered a separate species, Cyanoloxia rothschildii.

== Description ==
The blue-black grosbeak is sexually dimorphic. Females have dark brown plumage which can have a slight reddish hue. Males are dark blue with lighter blue eyebrows and shoulder patches on their wings. The forehead, the area just above the beak, is also a lighter shade of blue.

=== Vocalization ===
Blue-Black Grosbeak Song

Often blue-black grosbeaks will not be seen since they prefer to stay hidden among the vegetation, so most of the time their presence is known only when they vocalize. Their song is composed of about six whistles with decreasing pitch and ends with a "seee seee sewee suwee sweet suuu." There are slight differences in the songs between the three different subspecies.

Blue-Black Grosbeak Alarm Call

The call is a sharp "shek" or "chit" and will often be repeated many times.

== Distribution and habitat ==
The distribution of the blue-black grosbeak is limited to the Central and South American. It is found in Belize, Colombia, Costa Rica, Ecuador, Guatemala, Honduras, Mexico, Nicaragua, Panama, Peru, and Venezuela.

Both C.c. caerulescens and C.c. concreta are found in Mexico and Central America, while C.c. cyanoides can be found from Panama to northern South America.

They prefer habitats which are dense with tall trees and undergrowth because this provides sufficient cover. Although not generally seen, the blue-black grosbeak can be found at edges of broadleaf forests.

== Behaviour ==
=== Breeding ===
The blue-black grosbeak construct little cup nests to lay their eggs in and normally have a clutch size of 2. The breeding season of the blue-black grosbeak takes place during the spring and summer months, however the peak period of the breeding season differs slightly between populations located in different areas.

=== Diet ===
Blue-black grosbeaks are omnivorous; they have been known to eat seeds and fruits, as well as insects like ants and caterpillars. They crush the seeds before they consume them.

== Gallery ==
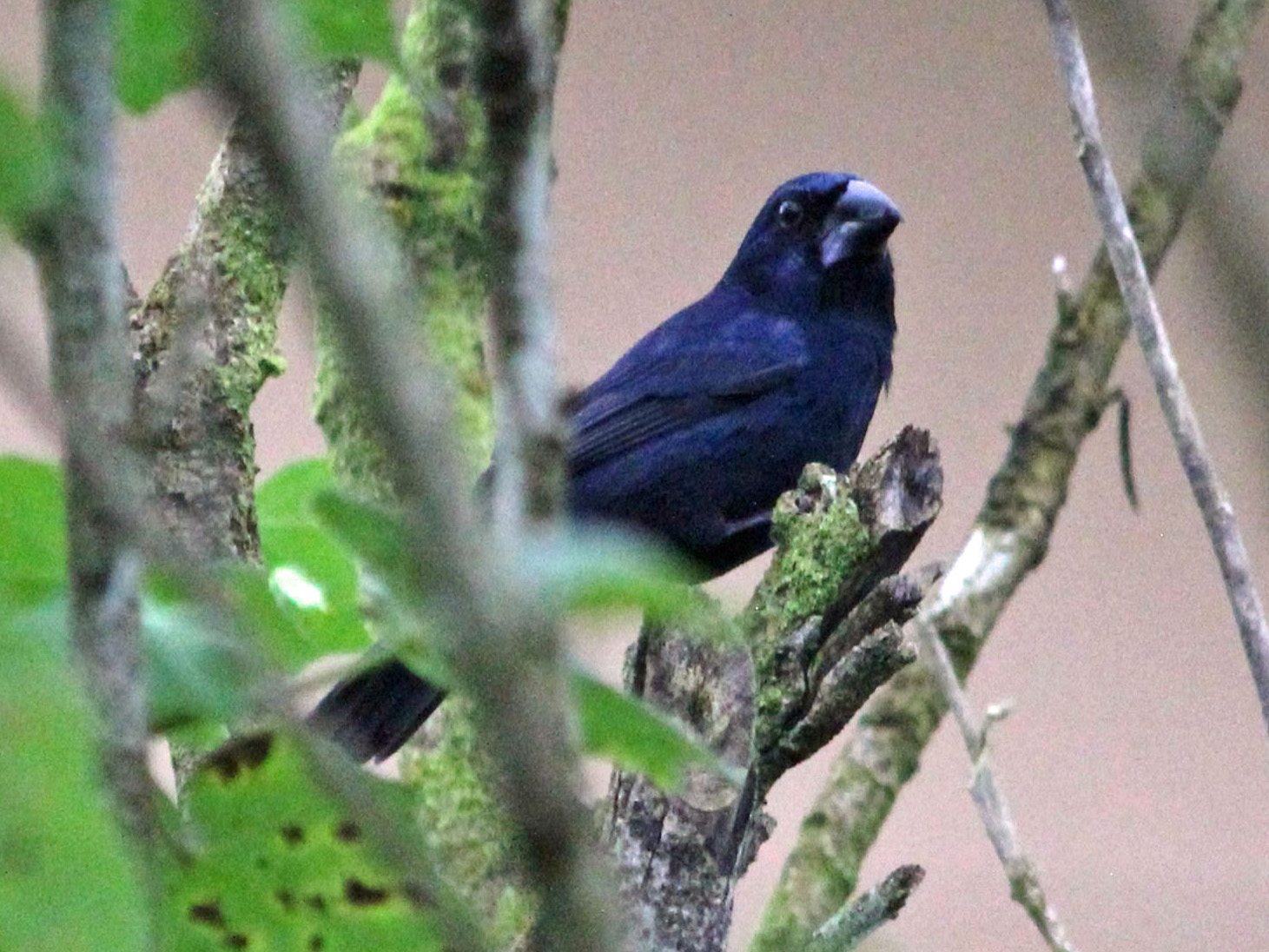
Male in Costa Rica

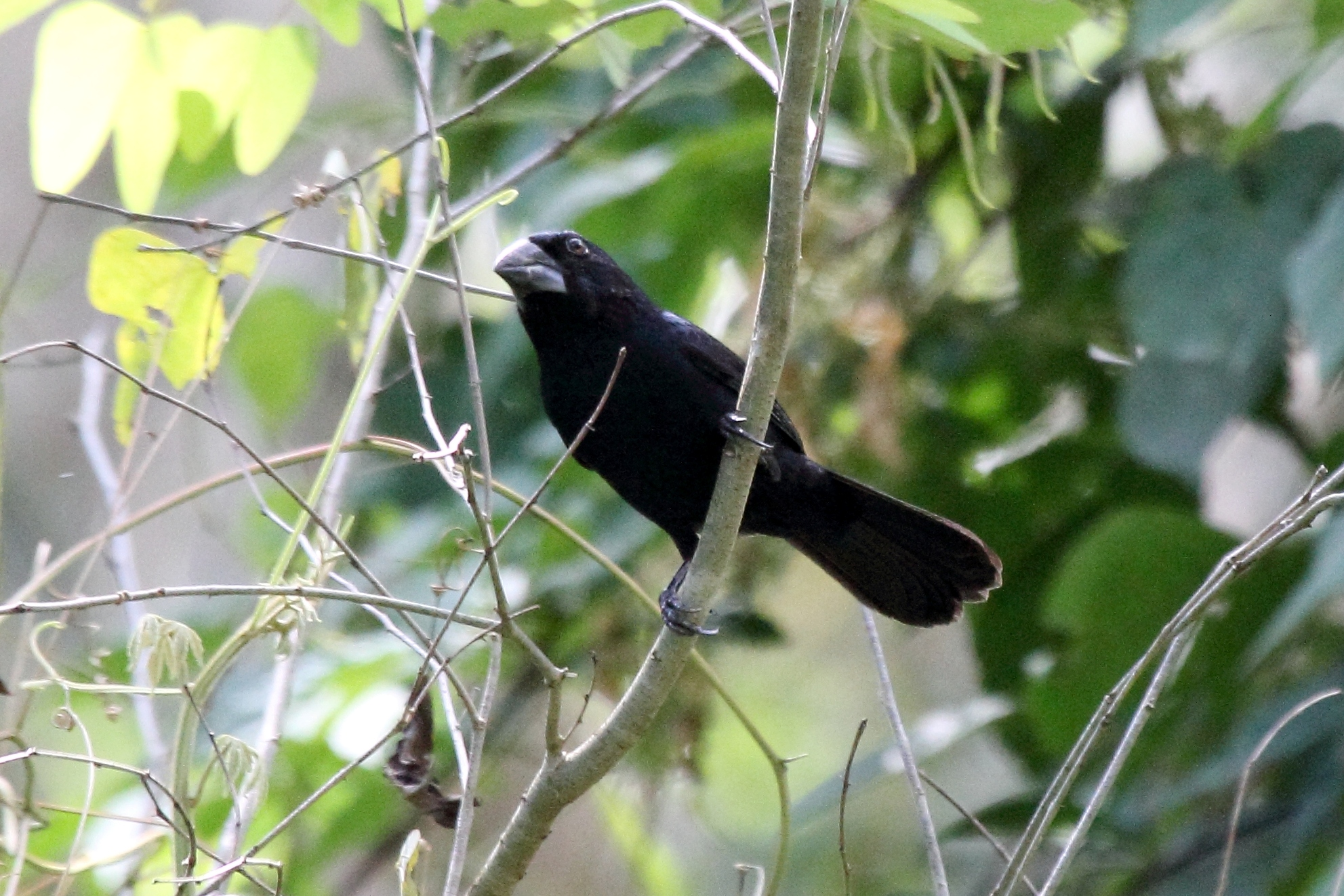

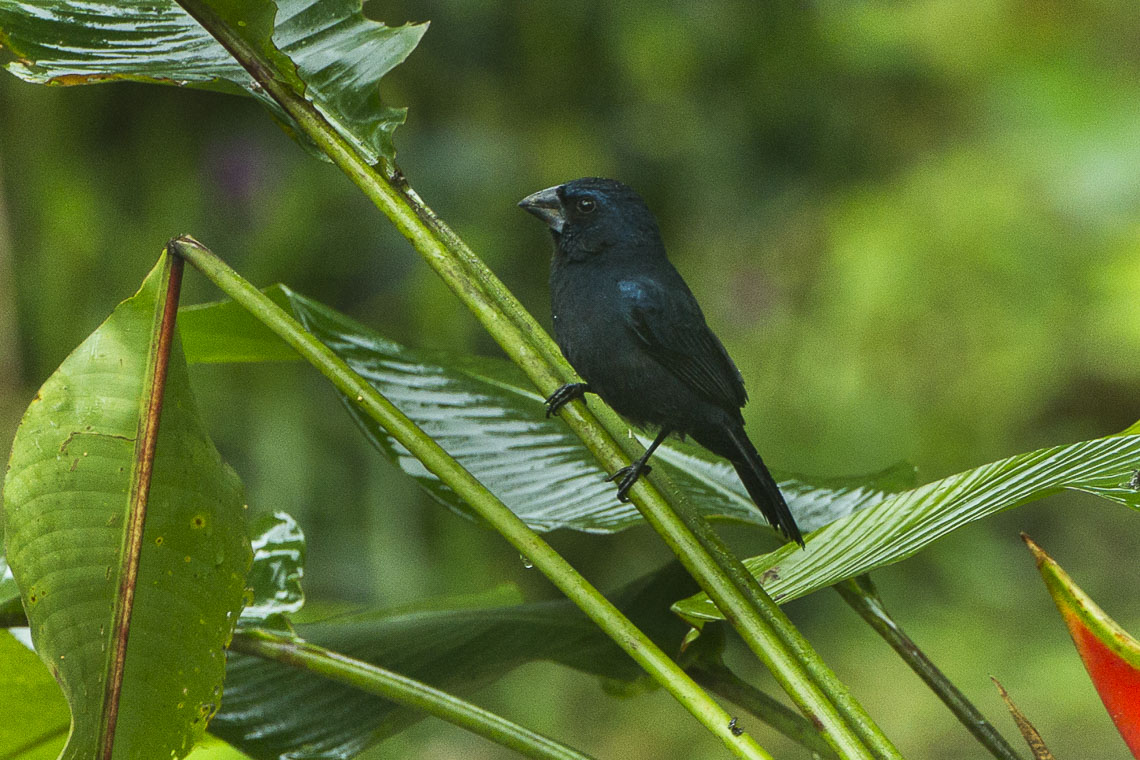
Blue-black grosbeak, El Tapir, Costa Rica

Media related to Cyanoloxia cyanoides at Wikimedia Commons
