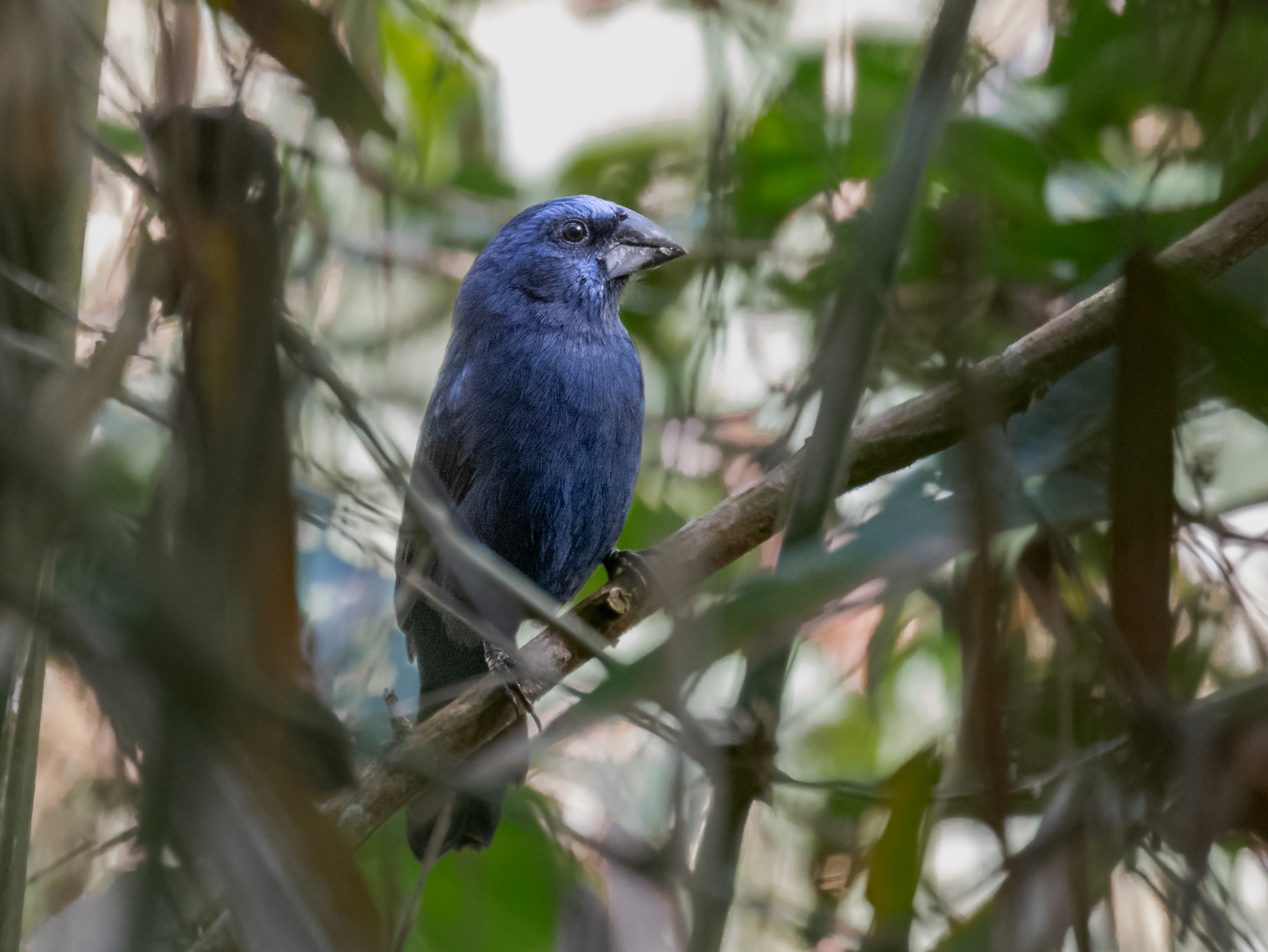

Conservation status
- Least Concern (IUCN 3.1)

Scientific classification
- Kingdom: Animalia
- Phylum: Chordata
- Class: Aves
- Order: Passeriformes
- Family: Cardinalidae
- Genus: Cyanoloxia
- Species: C. rothschildii

Binomial name
- Cyanoloxia rothschildii (Bartlett, E, 1890)

= Amazonian grosbeak =

Species of bird

The Amazonian grosbeak or Rothschild's grosbeak (Cyanoloxia rothschildii) is a species of grosbeak in the family Cardinalidae, the cardinals or cardinal grosbeaks. It is found in much of the Amazon Basin, in Bolivia, Brazil, Colombia, French Guiana, Guyana, Peru, Suriname, and Venezuela.

== Taxonomy and systematics ==
The Amazonian grosbeak is monotypic. It was formerly considered a subspecies of blue-black grosbeak (Cyanoloxia cyanoides) and following 2014 and 2016 publications it was elevated to species status.

== Description ==
The Amazonian grosbeak is 14.5 to 15 cm (5.7 to 5.9 in) long and weighs 21.5 to 31 g (0.76 to 1.09 oz). The adult male is mostly dark blue. Its forecrown and part of the wings are light blue and the underparts are blackish on the belly. It has a bit of black on the face. The female's upperparts are dark brown and the underparts a paler brown. Juveniles are similar to the female.

== Distribution and habitat ==
The Amazonian grosbeak is the most widely distributed grosbeak in the Amazon Basin. It is found from eastern Colombia south through eastern Ecuador and Peru to central Bolivia, from southern and eastern Venezuela east through the Guianas, and in all of Amazonian Brazil. In Venezuela it ranges in elevation from near sea level to 1,000 m (3,300 ft), in Peru to 1,400 m (4,600 ft), and in Bolivia mostly to 1,000 m (3,300 ft) and rarely to 1,200 m (3,900 ft). It inhabits the understory and edges of humid primary and tall secondary forests.

== Behavior ==
=== Feeding ===
Little is known about the Amazonian grosbeak's feeding behavior and diet, though it appears to eat mostly seeds and fruit with some insects as well.

=== Breeding ===
Almost nothing is known about the Amazonian grosbeak's breeding phenology. It appears to nest between January and June. The nest is a cup of dried leaves and fern stems and the clutch size is two.

=== Vocalization ===
The Amazonian grosbeak's song has been rendered as "pee tee-tu-tu-ti-pee'chee". Its call is "a sharp, harsh, dry tchit". As of May 2021, no recordings were available at Xeno-canto or the Macaulay Library.

== Status ==
The IUCN has assessed the Amazonian grosbeak as being of Least Concern. It has a very large range and tolerates disturbed habitats. "In the longer term, however, Amazonian Grosbeak potentially is vulnerable to widespread habitat loss."
