= Jose Gabriel del Rosario Brochero =

Argentine presbyter and saint (1840–1914)

Saint Joseph Gabriel TOSD
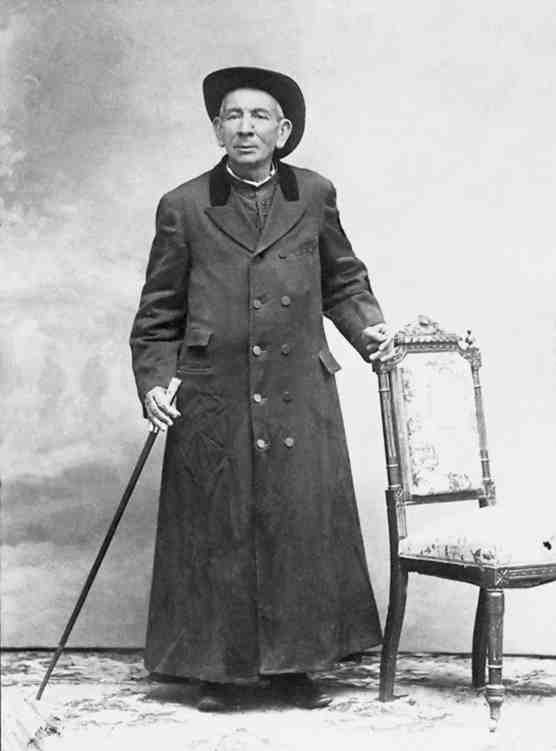
- Photo of Jose c. 1910
- Born: 16 March 1840; Santa Rosa de Río Primero, Argentine Confederation
- Died: 26 January 1914 (aged 73); Villa del Tránsito, Córdoba, Argentina
- Venerated in: Roman Catholic Church
- Beatified: 14 September 2013, Córdoba, Argentina by Cardinal Angelo Amato
- Canonized: 16 October 2016, Saint Peter's Square, Vatican City by Pope Francis
- Feast: 26 January 16 March
- Attributes: Priest's cassock; Rosary
- Patronage: Córdoba; Clergy; Major Seminary of Córdoba; Diocese of Cruz del Eje

Joseph Gabriel of the Rosary (sometimes José Gabriel del Rosario Brochero; 16 March 1840 – 26 January 1914), also referred to as Priest Brochero (in Spanish:Cura Brochero), was an Argentine Catholic priest who suffered leprosy throughout his life. He is known for his extensive work with the poor and the sick. He became affectionately known as "the Gaucho priest" and the "cowboy priest".

He was beatified on 14 September 2013 after a healing was recognized as a miracle attributed to him. Cardinal Angelo Amato – on the behalf of Pope Francis – presided over the beatification. Another miracle under investigation was approved in 2016 and a date for canonization was approved in a gathering of cardinals on 15 March 2016; Brochero was canonized on 16 October 2016.

== Life ==
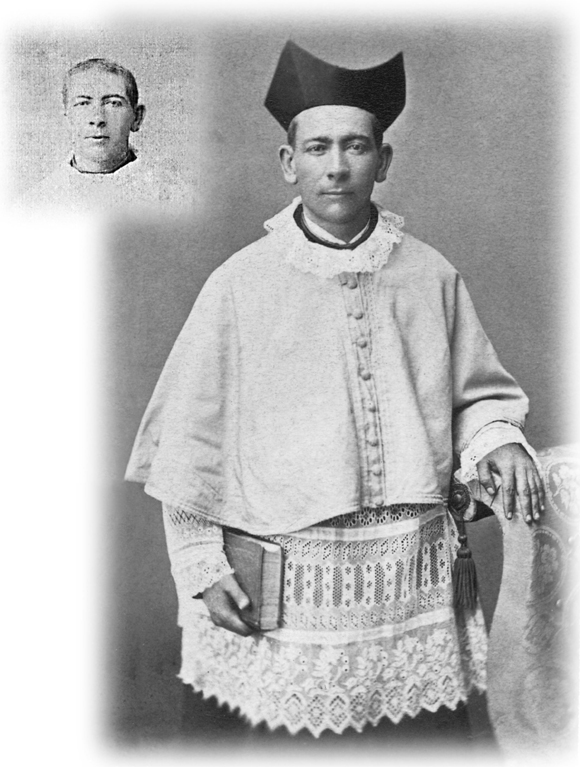
Brochero c. 1866

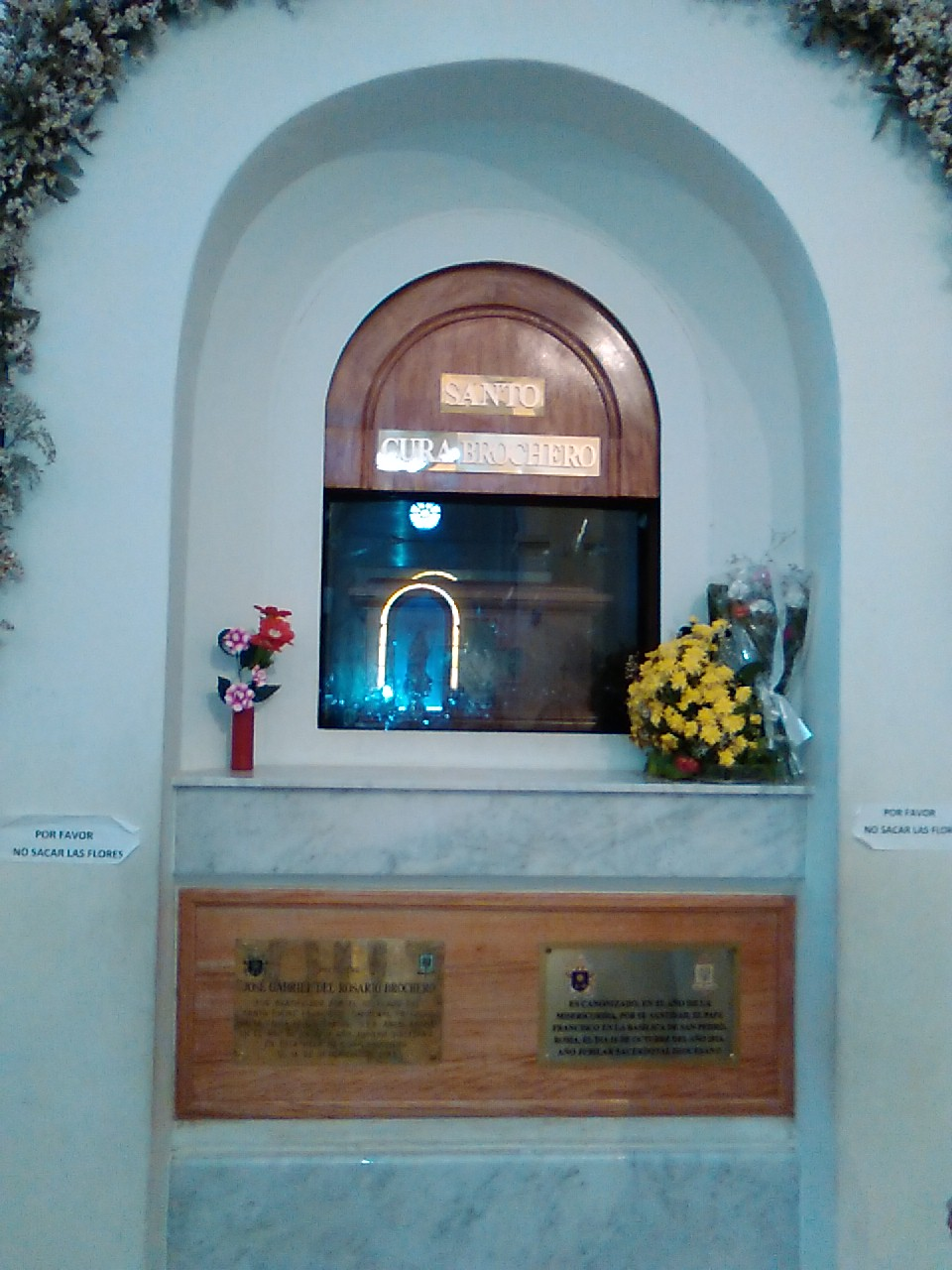
Crypt where the remains of Saint José Gabriel Brochero rest inside the sanctuary

Brochero was born on 16 March 1840 in Argentina as the fourth of ten children to Ignacio Brochero and Petrona Davila; he had two sisters and the others were brothers. Two sisters became nuns. He was baptized on 17 March along with the registration of his birth.

He commenced his studies to become a priest at the College Seminary of Our Lady of Loreto on 5 March 1856 at the age of sixteen and during his studies he met the future president Miguel Ángel Juárez Celman. Brochero received the tonsure on 16 July 1862; he was received into the subdiaconate on 26 May 1866 and then into the diaconate on 21 September 1866. He had joined the Third Order of Saint Dominic on 26 August 1866. He was ordained to the priesthood in the diocese of Córdoba on 4 November 1866 at the age of 26 under Bishop José Vicente Ramírez de Arellano and celebrated his first Mass the following 10 December. Brochero was later appointed as a prefect of studies of the seminary and was awarded the title of Master of Philosophy on 12 November 1869.

Brochero founded a home in 1875 for people known as the Houses of Exercises (inaugurated in 1877) and later established a school for girls in 1880. He requested and obtained from the authorities courier posts, post offices and telegraphic posts and also planned the rail network that would go through the Valley of Traslasierra joining Villa Dolores and Soto. He devoted all of his energy to those who required his help and no sick person was left devoid of the sacraments, as there was no force that could stop him helping them, and he had even said "woe if the devil is going to rob a soul from me".

Brochero was known to travel long distances in Argentina on the back of a mule dressed in a sombrero and a poncho to serve the needs of the Christian faith throughout his huge parish. He cared for the sick during the cholera epidemic of 1867 and contracted leprosy during his travels; it was believed that it came from drinking yerba mate with some of the patients with the affliction. He became well known to his parishioners and made efforts to improve all aspects of their involvement in church life. He became blind and deaf towards the end of his life. Throughout his travels to meet parishioners he would bring with him the image of the Blessed Virgin Mary, his Mass kit and a prayer book.

He was appointed to successive positions such as Canon of the Cathedral of Córdoba on 24 April 1898. He left for that post on 30 May but was later appointed as a pastor in Villa del Transito on 25 August 1902, arriving there on the following 3 October. He resigned from his position as pastor on 5 February 1908 and returned the following 30 March back home to live with his sisters.

Brochero died on 26 January 1914, his last words being: "Now I have everything ready for the journey". A Catholic newspaper later wrote of him: "It is known that Father Brochero contracted the sickness that took him to his tomb, because he visited at length and embraced an abandoned leper of the area".

=== Legacy ===
In Port-au-Prince in Haiti a rehabilitation clinic for the handicapped was opened in honor of Brochero, dubbed Kay Gabriel ("Gabriel's house").

== Veneration ==
=== Diocesan process and beatification ===
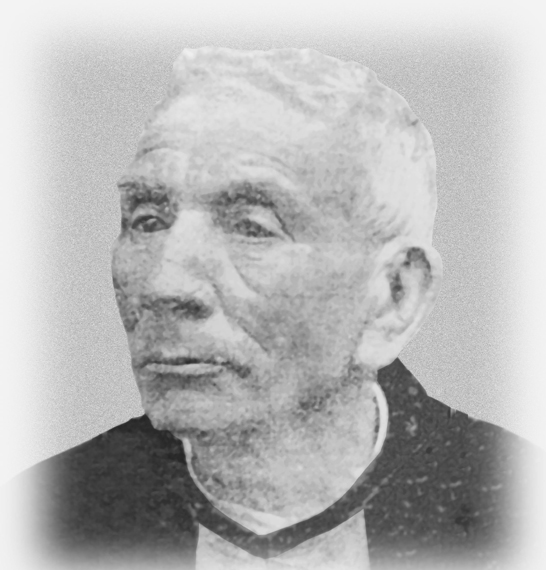
Brochero c. 1910

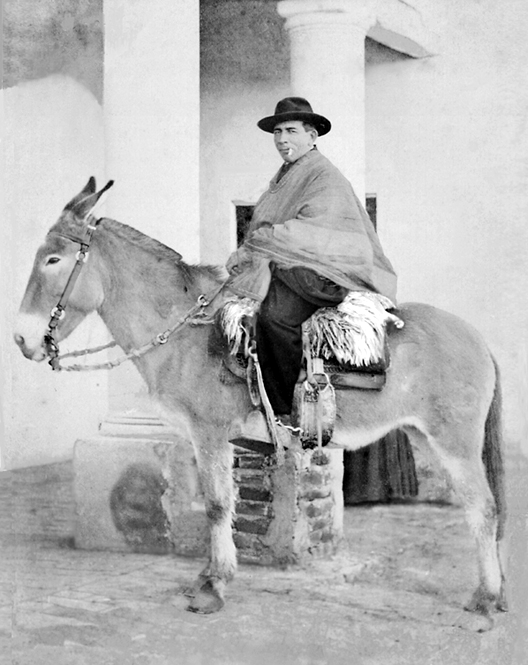
José Gabriel Brochero riding his mule c. 1870–1880.

The cause of beatification commenced on 17 March 1967 under Pope Paul VI in Argentina which gave him the title Servant of God; the actual process started in 1968 which saw the gathering of both documents and witness testimonies that pertained to his life and virtues. The positio was submitted to Rome in 1997 in order for the Congregation for the Causes of Saints for further evaluation.

Pope John Paul II recognized that Brochero lived a life of heroic virtue and named him to be venerable on 19 April 2004. Pope Benedict XVI approved a miracle attributed to Brochero's intercession on 20 December 2012 which would allow for his beatification to take place. The miracle involved Nicolas Flores who was in a vegetative state after a severe car crash at the age of thirteen and was cured through the intercession of Brochero.

Cardinal Angelo Amato presided over the beatification in Argentina on 14 September 2013 and announced Brochero's feast would be celebrated on 16 March.

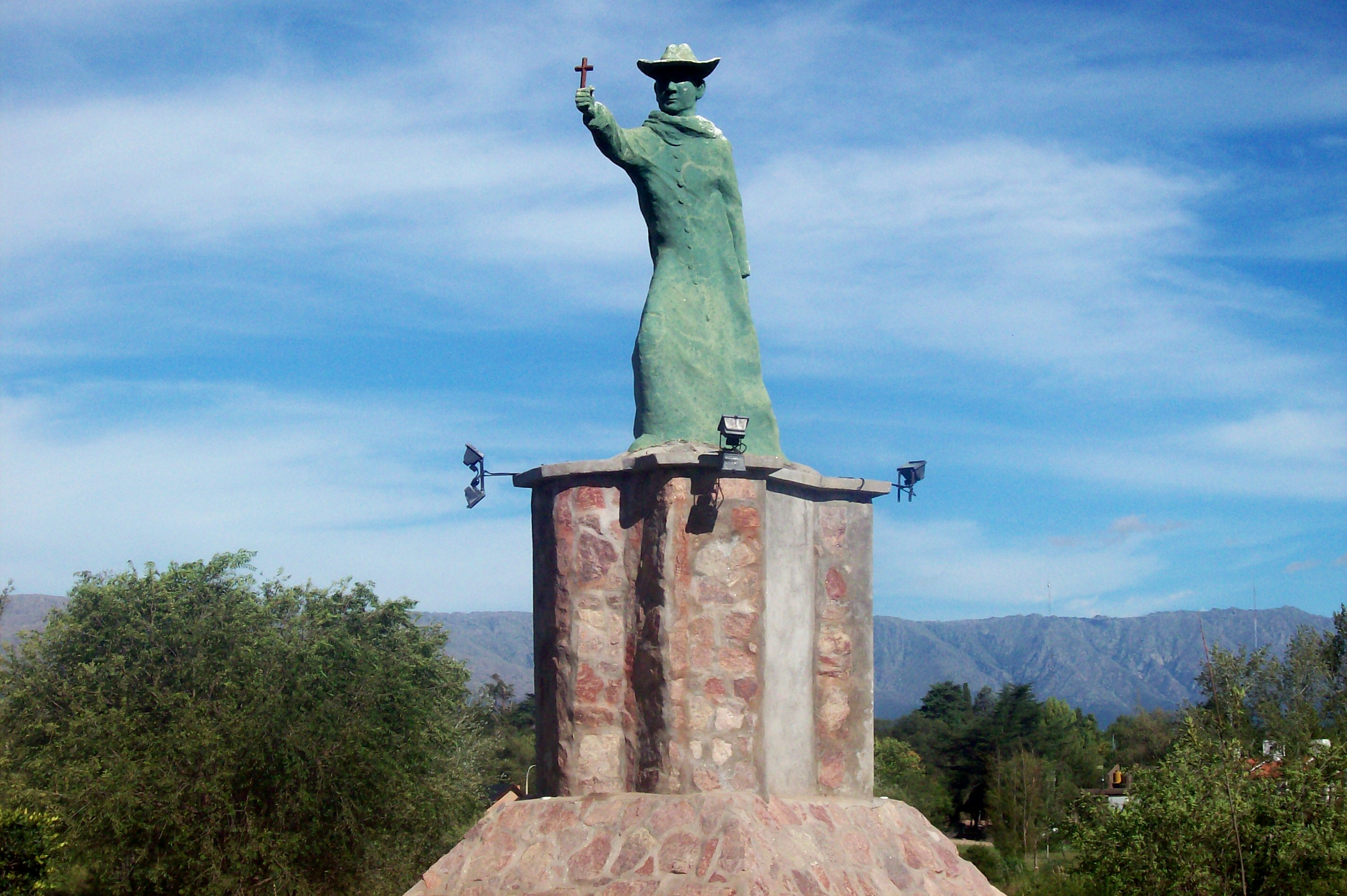
Monument to José Gabriel Brochero, in Villa Cura Brochero.

Pope Francis – in his Angelus address on 15 September to mark the occasion – praised Brochero for his open heart to all and stated that "he knew the love of Jesus. He let his heart be touched by the mercy of God" which he extended to all people. The pope also said that Brochero was a man who "dedicated himself entirely to his flock" in order to evangelize to them and that the needs of the people came first as his sole focus.

=== Second miracle ===
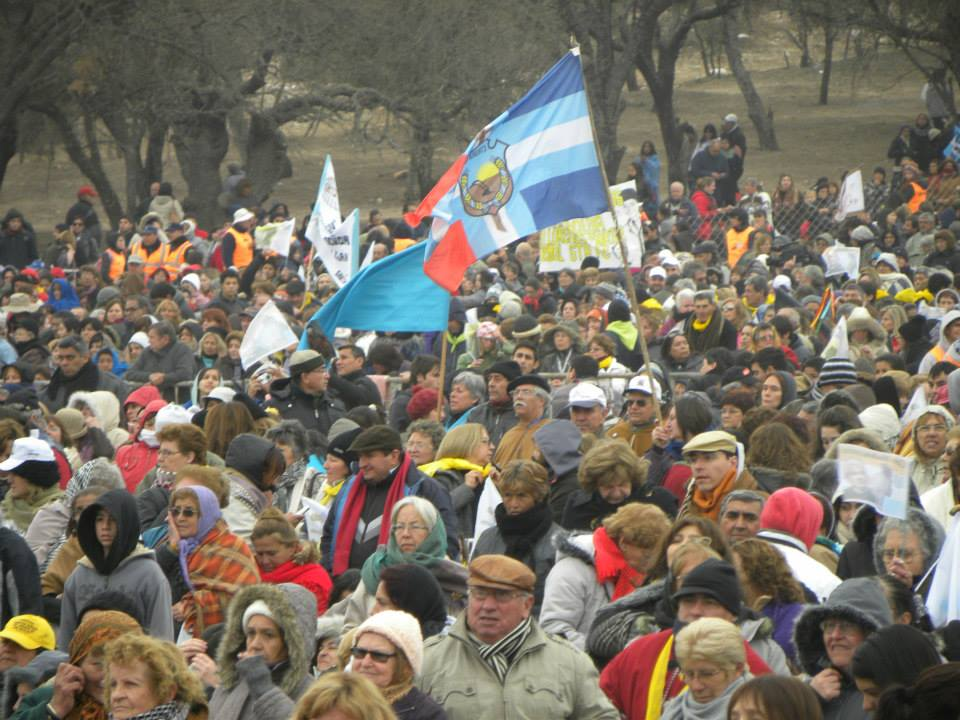
Pilgrims present at the 2013 beatification for Brochero

It was suggested that Pope Francis could preside over the canonization in Cordoba in July 2016 during a possible apostolic visit to Argentina, though it would be celebrated in Rome if the visit did not go ahead. Since the pontiff's visit was rescheduled, the canonization would not take place in Argentina as was expected but would take place in Rome when it would be approved.

The diocesan process for the second miracle – the healing of a girl – commenced on 16 July 2014 and concluded its business on 25 March 2015; the process received the formal decree of ratification on 28 March 2015. The miracle proceeded to the Medical Board in Rome on 10 September 2015 and was approved and theologians also approved the miracle on 3 November 2015. The congregation met to discuss the cause on 12 January 2016 and received its full approval.

Pope Francis approved the second miracle attributed to Brochero on 21 January 2016 and confirmed the date of the late priest's canonization at a gathering of cardinals to be held on 15 March 2016; Brochero was canonized as a saint of the Roman Catholic Church on 16 October 2016 in Saint Peter's Square. The postulator at the time of the canonization was Silvia Mónica Correale.
