= Villa Cura Brochero =

- City
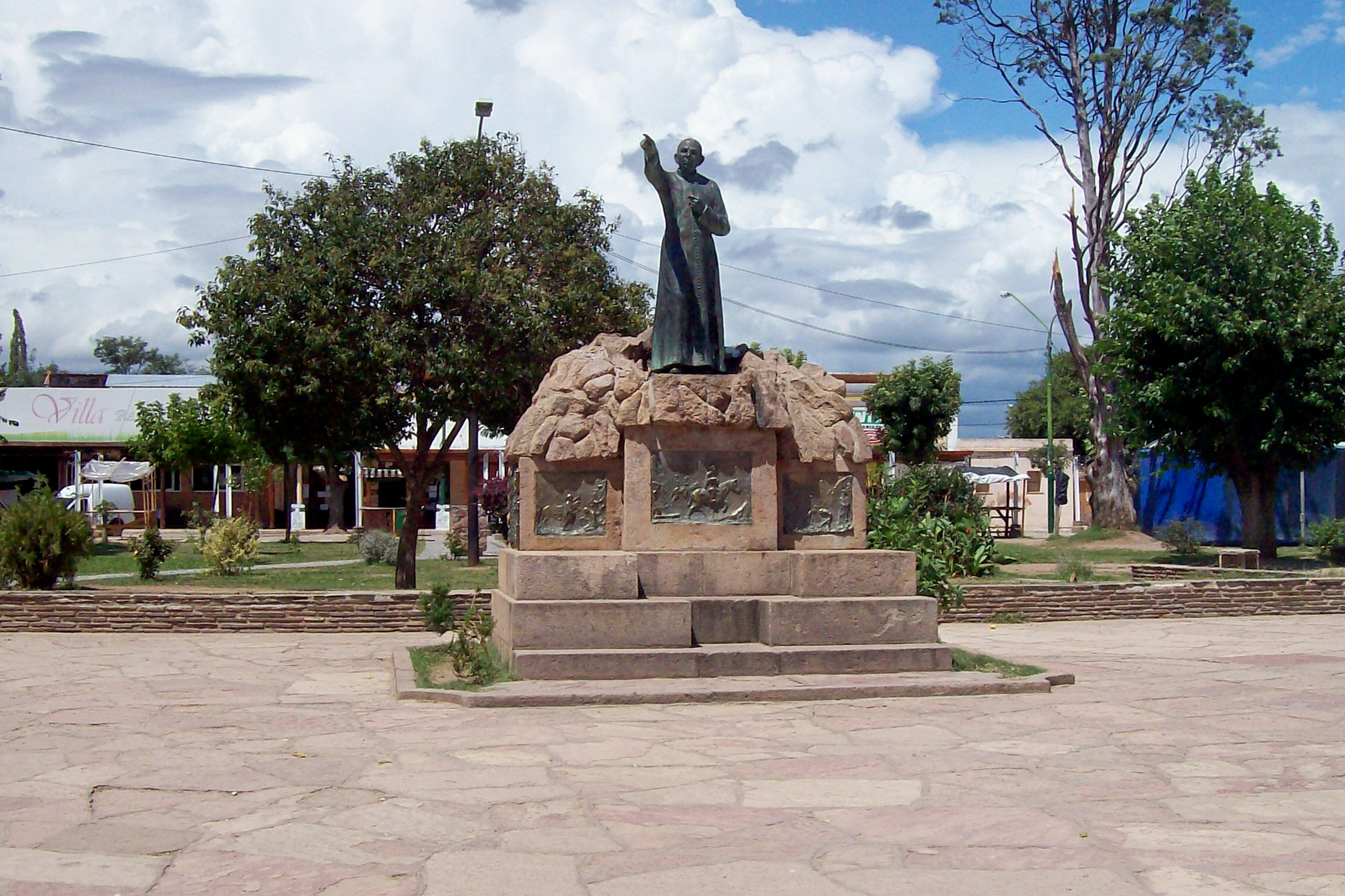
- Monumento to Cura Brochero in Plaza Centenario

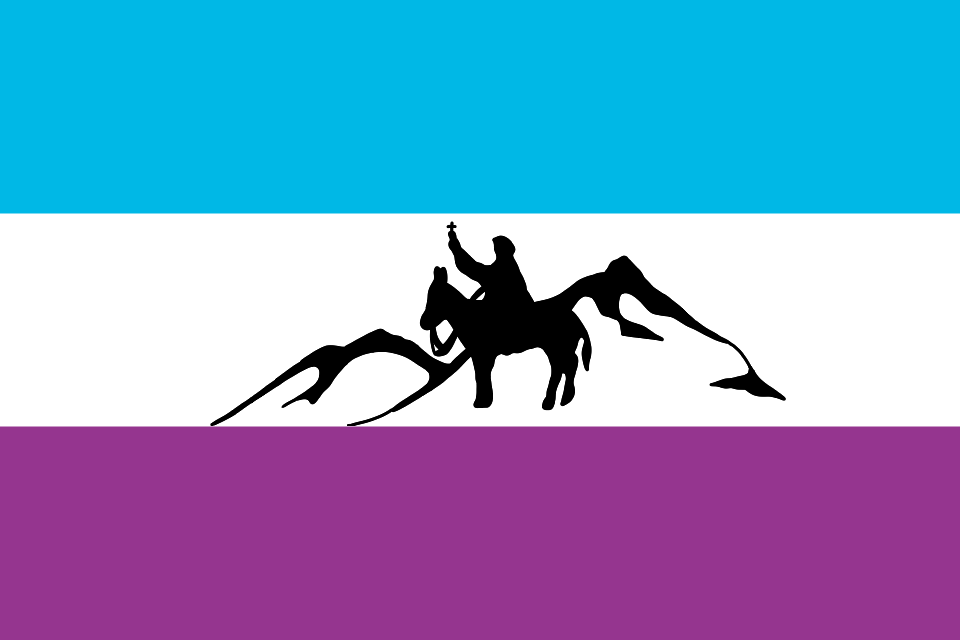
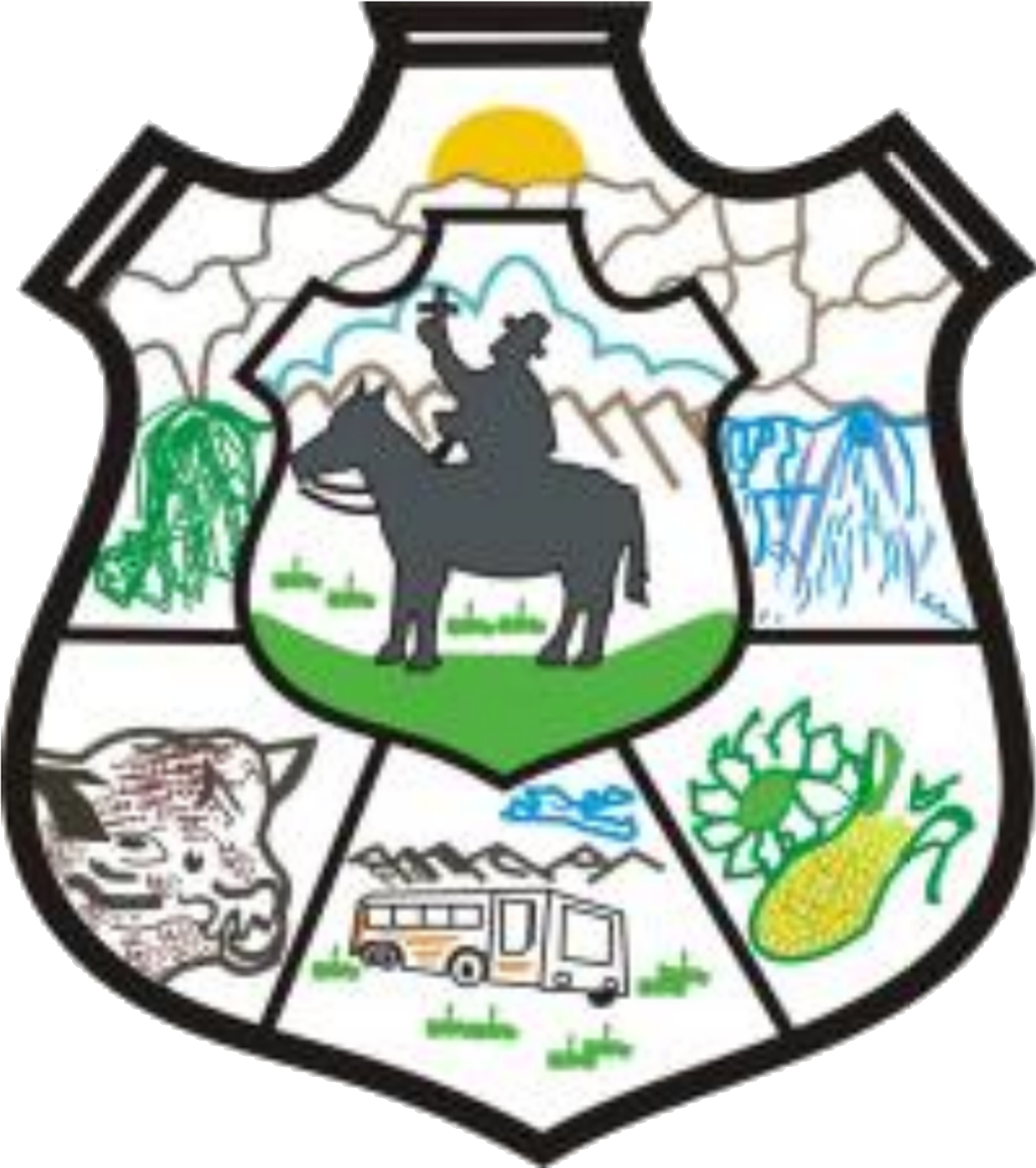
- Flag Coat of arms

- Location of Villa Cura Brochero in Argentina
- Coordinates: 31°40′S 65°01′W
- Country: Argentina
- Province: Córdoba
- Department: San Alberto

Government
  - Intendant: Carlos Oviedo
- Elevation: 959 m (3,146 ft)

Population (2012)
  - Total: 10,926
- Demonym: brocheriana/o
- Time zone: UTC−3 (ART)
- CPA base: X5891
- Dialing code: +54 3544

Villa Cura Brochero is a city in Córdoba Province in Argentina. It is the capital of the San Alberto Department.
