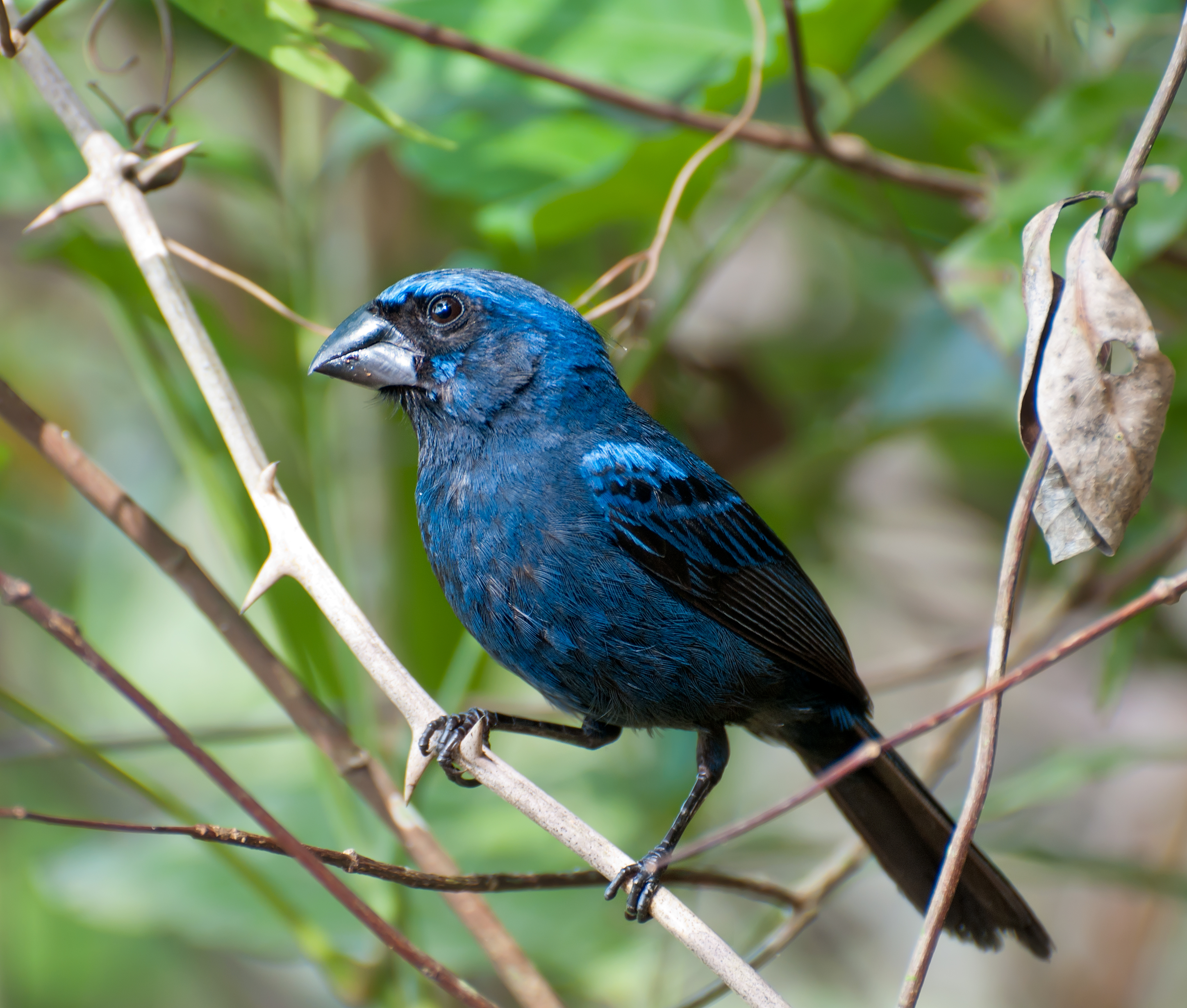
- Male in Registro, São Paulo, Brazil
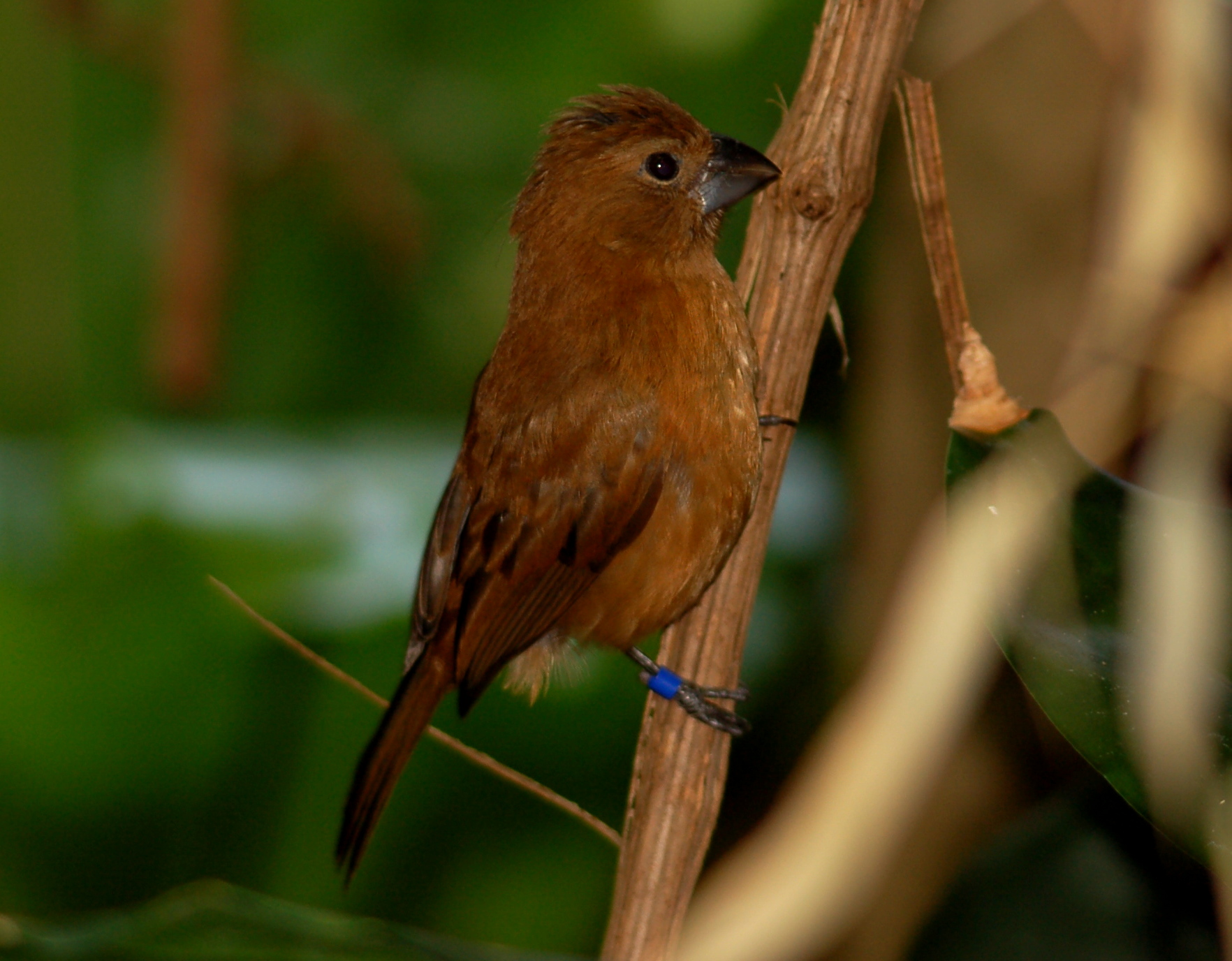
- Female

Conservation status
- Least Concern (IUCN 3.1)

Scientific classification
- Kingdom: Animalia
- Phylum: Chordata
- Class: Aves
- Order: Passeriformes
- Family: Cardinalidae
- Genus: Cyanoloxia
- Species: C. brissonii

Binomial name
- Cyanoloxia brissonii (Lichtenstein, MHC, 1823)

Synonyms
- Passerina brissonii (protonym)

= Ultramarine grosbeak =

Ultramarine Grosbeak

Species of bird

The ultramarine grosbeak (Cyanoloxia brissonii) is a species of grosbeak in the family Cardinalidae. It is found in a wide range of semi-open habitats in eastern and central South America, with a disjunct population in northern South America.

== Description ==
These birds are 15 cm long. Adult males exhibit a dark-blue plumage with bright-blue highlights on the head and upper-wings and black on the face, wings and tail. The females and the juveniles are brown. Both sexes show black legs and large, thick bill.

The Ultramarine Grosbeak is sedentary, only noted to have short-distance local migrations. Individuals of this species are solitary and often territorial, rarely associating with conspecifics or loosely aggregating in mixed-species flocks.

== Distribution and habitat ==
Ultramarine Grosbeaks occur in open or semi-open edge habitats, in dense scrub such as thickets, preferably at the edge of swamps, secondary forests, and agricultural fields or plantations.

The distribution of these birds is disjunct; their range extends from northeast and central Brazil to Bolivia, Paraguay, and Argentina and throughout the Gran Chaco. An isolated population can be found in southwestern Colombia, between the Western and Central cordilleras throughout the Cauca valley and Dagua regions, where they prefer dry forest borders and semi-arid desert. Another population is found in the mountains of northern Venezuela, from Falcón to the Lara, Sucre, and Monagas regions. There are some morphological and behavioural differences between subspecies from different regions.

== Behaviour and ecology ==
=== Breeding ===
Throughout its range, the breeding season for this species generally takes place between September and February. Ultramarine Grosbeaks build cup nests in thick vegetation, close to the ground up to 5 m high, with a clutch of 2 to 3 eggs. The chicks hatch between 13 and 15 days after the eggs are laid.

=== Feeding ===
Feeds mainly on seeds, flowers, and fruits but opportunistically forages for insects.
