= Valle de Traslasierra =

Traslasierra Valley (Spanish: Valle de Traslasierra), or simply Traslasierra, is a natural geographic region of the province of Córdoba, Argentina, located west of the Sierras Grandes and east of the Sierras Occidentales. The tourist capital is the city of Mina Clavero and the most important commercial center is the city of Villa Dolores.

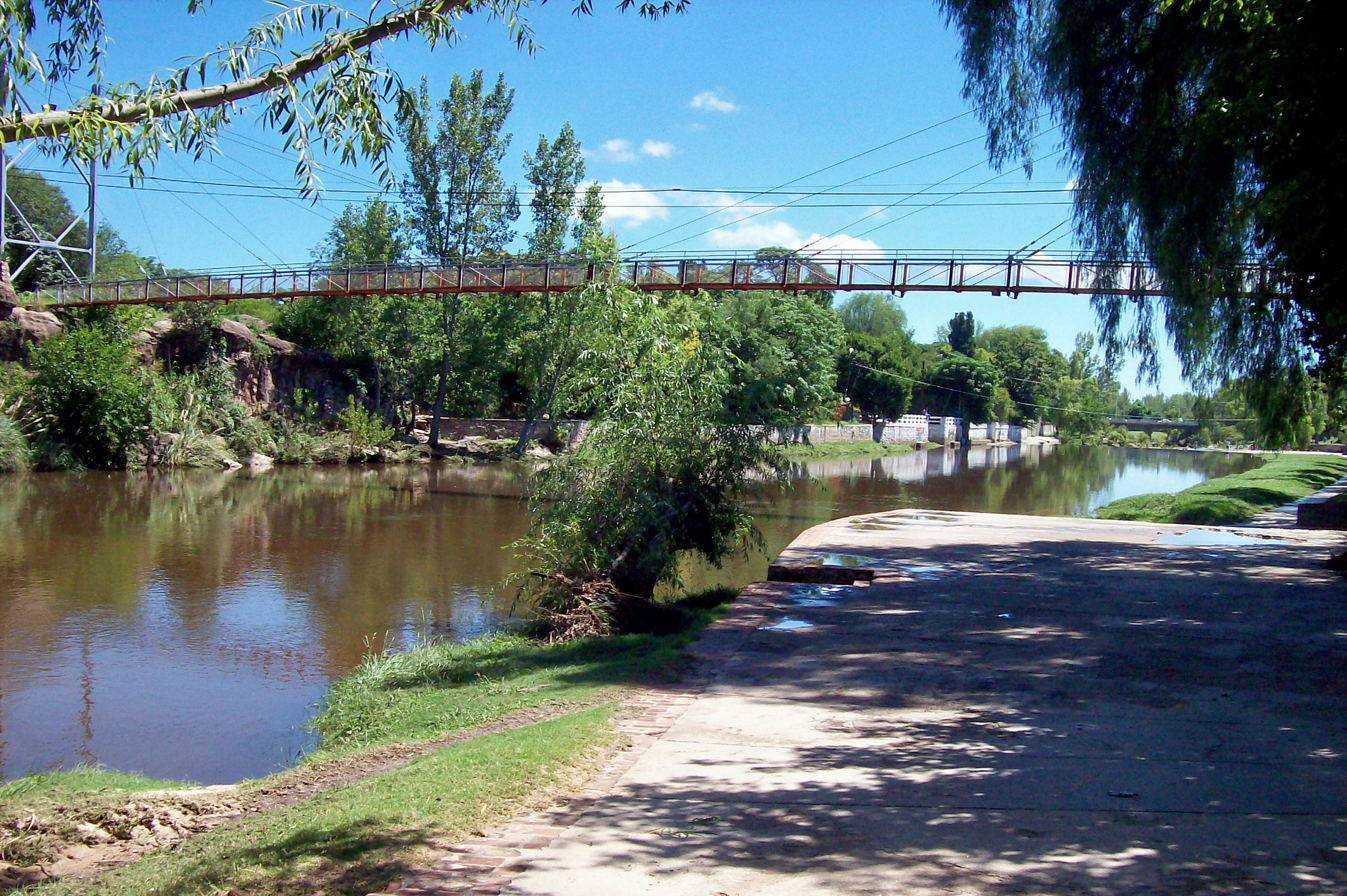
Little pedestrian bridge over the river Mina Clavero.

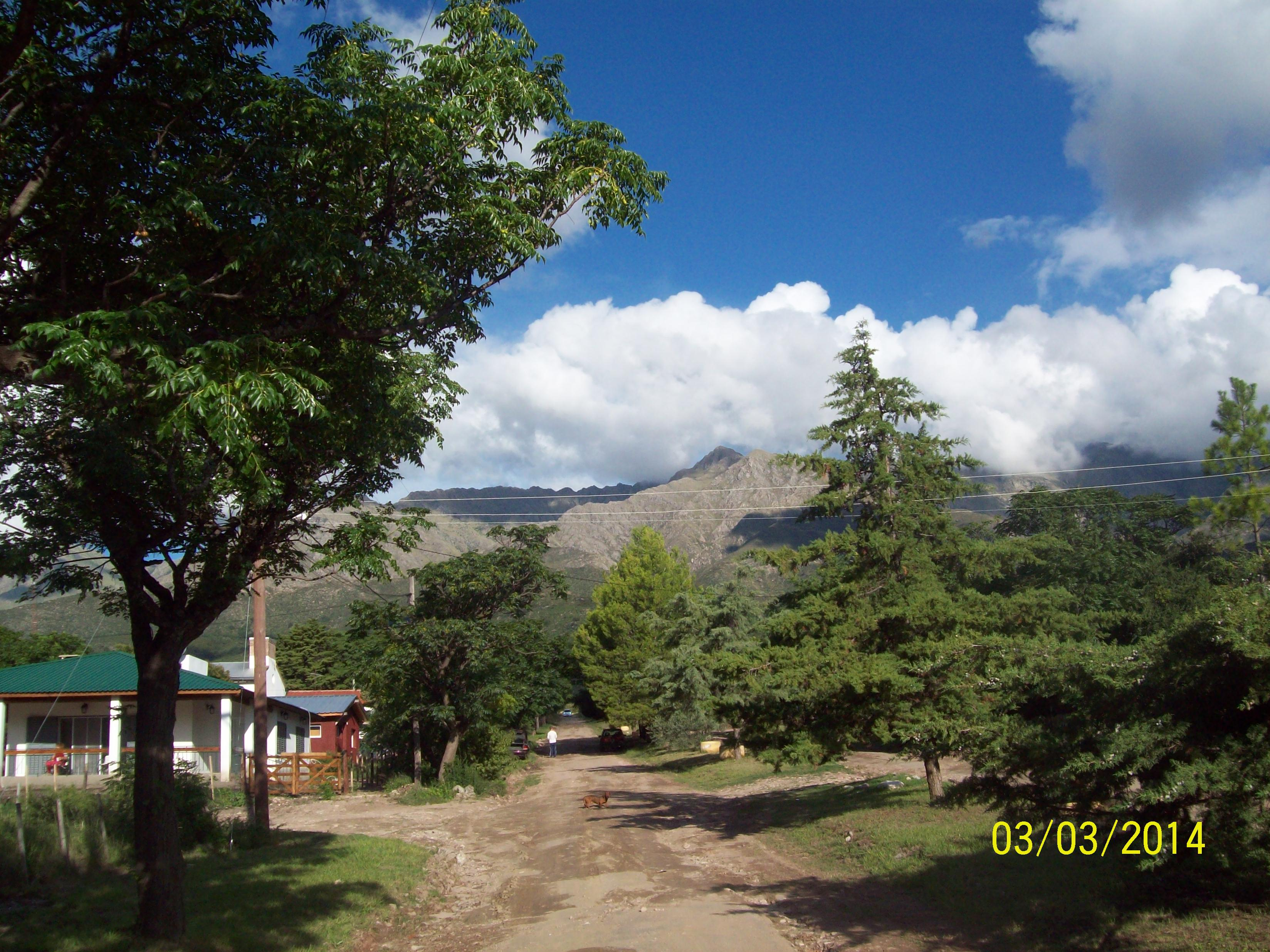
Los Hornillos, Córdoba Argentina in the meridional summer.

Because of its isolation until recent times, the area of Traslasierra Valley has a lower population density than the other valleys of the Sierras de Córdoba and has maintained the creole culture of gaucho type. From the 1980s, due to the difficulties of accessibility and the wild nature, the hippie movement or similar groups have settled in the area.

== End of isolation ==
The Camino de las Altas Cumbres was conducted under the direction of Cura Brochero between the end of s. XIX and beginning of s. XX. Following sections of this road, in 1970 the route was consolidated as provincial route number 34, capable of supporting heavy and fast automobile traffic. This route unites Mina Clavero in Traslasierra Valley and Villa Carlos Paz in Punilla Valley.

== Neighboring village ==
In the center and along the mountain range of nearly 2,900 meters, is a series of mountain villages:

- Nono
- Las Calles
- Las Rabonas
- Los Hornillos
- Quebrada de Los Pozos
- Villa de Las Rosas
- Los Molles
- Las Tapias
- Chuchiras
- San Javier
- Yacanto
- Luyaba
- La Paz
- San Lorenzo

And important cities such as:

- Villa Cura Brochero
- Mina Clavero
- Villa Dolores

== Population ==
According to provisional census data of 2010 nacional census, in Traslasierra live 100 331 people, distributed among the four departments in the valley: Department San Javier, San Alberto Department, Pocho Department and Department Mines. Over half the population lives in the first.
