= 2019–20 Rosario Central season =

Rosario Central
2019–20 season
- President: Rodolfo Di Pollina
- Manager: Diego Cocca
- Stadium: Estadio Gigante de Arroyito
- Top goalscorer: League: Ciro Rius (2); Claudio Riaño; All: Ciro Rius (2); Claudio Riaño

The 2019–20 season is Rosario Central's 8th consecutive season in the top division of Argentine football. In addition to the Primera División, the club are competing in the Copa Argentina and Copa de la Superliga.

The season generally covers the period from 1 July 2019 to 30 June 2020.

== Review ==
=== Pre-season ===
Rosario Central's first incoming was Josué Ayala, who came permanently from Temperley. On 11 June 2019, Rosario Central announced the signing of Ciro Rius; the right winger, who joined from Defensa y Justicia, would make his unofficial debut four days later as the club played their first friendly. Argentino visited the Estadio Gigante de Arroyito on 15 June, and were subsequently dispatched 2–0. 19 June saw Washington Camacho leave for Tijuana. A deal with Unión Santa Fe was reached, subject to personal terms and medicals, on 20 June for the transfers of Emanuel Brítez and Diego Zabala. They were completed a day later. Their next match was played on 22 June, as they beat Sportivo Las Parejas with Claudio Riaño, Fabián Rinaudo, Facundo Almada and Ortigoza goals.

Left-back Gonzalo Bettini was signed by Huracán on 27 June. Ciro Rius scored for them for the first time on 29 June, netting in a friendly victory over their reserves. Numerous loans from the previous campaign officially expired on and around 30 June. Marcos Martinich left for Temperley on 1 July. Luciano Recalde headed off to Platense on 5 July. Diego Novaretti arrived from Querétaro on 5 July, penning a two-year contract. Nicolás Giménez was transferred to San Martín on 5 July. Rosario lost on penalties in an exhibition match at the Estadio Manuel Ferreira against Olimpia on 6 July. They met Rosario-based Central Córdoba in a friendly on 10 July, winning 2–1 at the Estadio Arroyo Seco. Sebastián Ribas moved in on loan from Lanús on 11 July.

Primera B Nacional's Temperley captured centre-back Fernando Alarcón on 12 July. They played out consecutive goalless draws with Unión Santa Fe on 13 July on home soil. Marco Torsiglieri departed to Gimnasia y Esgrima on 16 July, while Duván Vergara penned loan terms with homeland club América de Cali on loan. A Maximiliano Lovera penalty helped Rosario defeat Fénix in a 17 July pre-season friendly. Rosario failed to gain a win on 20 July in exhibition games with Arsenal de Sarandí. Agustín Coscia, the top goalscorer in their reserves, was loaned to Almagro on 24 July. Matías Palavecino switched Argentina for Cyprus on 26 July, as ASIL of the Second Division revealed his arrival. Facundo Rizzi went to Villa Dálmine on 27 July.

=== July ===
Rosario Central began their league campaign with a victory on the road against Atlético Tucumán on 29 July, with new signing Ciro Rius netting alongside Leonardo Gil. Also on that date, Hernán Da Campo was loaned to Chacarita Juniors. Nicolás Colazo, from Boca Juniors, became Diego Cocca's sixth new signing on 30 July.

=== August ===
On 1 August, Rosario announced the arrival of Lucas Gamba from Huracán on a three-year contract. Soon after, Alfonso Parot's departure to Universidad Católica was confirmed. A goal versus Talleres from off-season signing Diego Zabala secured Rosario two wins from two in the Primera División on 3 August. Rosario shared victories with Sarmiento in exhibition fixtures on 6 August. Rosario met Argentino in friendly action again on 9 August, as they beat them by scoring twice, as they did on 15 June, in both games. Andrés Lioi headed to Poland on loan with Korona Kielce of the Ekstraklasa on 13 August. San Lorenzo and Rosario Central cancelled each other out on 17 August, as Rosario threw away a two-goal advantage to draw 2–2 which ended winning starts for both.

Rosario made it four undefeated in the league on 24 August, after drawing at home to Patronato; Maximiliano Lovera scored for them. On 31 August, Lovera was sold to Olympiacos.

=== September ===
Rosario experienced their third tie in a row on 1 September after a 1–1 scoreline with Colón, though the result did extend their unbeaten streak to five matches.

== Squad ==
Squad No.	Nationality	Name	Position(s)	Date of Birth (age)	Signed from
Goalkeepers
1	Argentina	Jeremías Ledesma	GK	13 February 1993 (age 33)	Academy
30	Argentina	Marcelo Miño	GK	21 August 1997 (age 29)	Academy
31	Argentina	Josué Ayala	GK	30 May 1988 (age 38)	Temperley
Defenders
2	Argentina	Matías Caruzzo	CB	15 August 1984 (age 42)	San Lorenzo
4	Argentina	Nahuel Molina	RB	2 December 1997 (age 28)	Boca Juniors (loan)
6	Argentina	Miguel Barbieri	CB	24 August 1993 (age 33)	Racing Club (loan)
14	Argentina	Diego Novaretti	CB	9 May 1985 (age 41)	Querétaro
16	Argentina	Rodrigo González	RB	14 April 2000 (age 26)	Academy
32	Argentina	Facundo Almada	CB	10 July 1998 (age 28)	Academy
33	Argentina	Emanuel Brítez	RB	26 March 1992 (age 34)	Unión Santa Fe
35	Argentina	Iván Antúnez	DF	23 April 1998 (age 28)	Academy
	Paraguay	José Leguizamón	CB	23 August 1991 (age 35)	Olimpia
Midfielders
5	Argentina	Leonardo Gil	CM	31 May 1991 (age 35)	Estudiantes
7	Argentina	Joaquín Pereyra	LM	1 December 1998 (age 27)	Academy
8	Argentina	Agustín Allione	LM	28 October 1994 (age 32)	Palmeiras
10	Paraguay	Néstor Ortigoza	DM	7 October 1984 (age 42)	Olimpia
11	Argentina	Jonás Aguirre	AM	5 March 1992 (age 34)	Academy
15	Argentina	Rodrigo Villagra	CM	14 February 2001 (age 25)	Academy
18	Argentina	Francesco Lo Celso	MF	5 March 2000 (age 26)	Academy
21	Argentina	Fabián Rinaudo	DM	8 May 1987 (age 39)	Gimnasia y Esgrima
22	Argentina	Diego Zabala	RW	19 September 1991 (age 35)	Unión Santa Fe
25	Argentina	Emmanuel Ojeda	CM	5 November 1997 (age 29)	Academy
	Argentina	Diego Becker	LM	24 November 1997 (age 28)	Academy
	Argentina	Nicolás Colazo	LM	8 July 1990 (age 36)	Boca Juniors
	Argentina	Maximiliano González	CM	12 March 1994 (age 32)	Academy
	Argentina	Joel López Pissano	AM	6 January 1997 (age 29)	Academy
Forwards
9	Argentina	Claudio Riaño	CF	4 August 1988 (age 38)	Necaxa
12	Argentina	Ciro Rius	RW	27 October 1988 (age 38)	Defensa y Justicia
17	Argentina	Alan Marinelli	FW	7 April 1999 (age 27)	Academy
20	Argentina	Fernando Zampedri	CF	14 February 1988 (age 38)	Atlético Tucumán
23	Uruguay	Sebastián Ribas	CF	11 March 1988 (age 38)	Lanús (loan)
28	Argentina	Lucas Gamba	CF	24 June 1987 (age 39)	Huracán
39	Argentina	Oscar Retamal	RW	23 March 1998 (age 28)	Academy
	Argentina	Pablo Becker	LW	29 April 1993 (age 33)	Academy
	Argentina	Germán Herrera	RW	19 July 1983 (age 43)	Vasco da Gama
	Argentina	Rodrigo Migone	CF	6 June 1996 (age 30)	Academy
Out on loan					Loaned to
37	Colombia	Duván Vergara	CF	9 September 1996 (age 30)	América de Cali
	Argentina	Agustín Coscia	CF	8 April 1997 (age 29)	Almagro
	Argentina	Hernán Da Campo	RM	6 August 1994 (age 32)	Chacarita Juniors
	Argentina	Elías Gómez	LB	9 June 1994 (age 32)	Argentinos Juniors
	Argentina	Andrés Lioi	RM	7 March 1997 (age 29)	Korona Kielce
	Argentina	Agustín Maziero	CF	27 November 1997 (age 28)	Magallanes
	Argentina	Leonel Rivas	AM	4 December 1999 (age 26)	Talleres
	Argentina	Marco Ruben	CF	26 October 1986 (age 40)	Athletico Paranaense

== Transfers ==
Domestic transfer windows:
3 July 2019 to 24 September 2019
20 January 2020 to 19 February 2020.

=== Transfers in ===
Date from	Position	Nationality	Name	From	Ref.
3 July 2019 (Note: Deal agreed on 4 June 2019)	GK	Argentina	Josué Ayala	Temperley	
3 July 2019 (Note: Deal agreed on 11 June 2019)	RW	Argentina	Ciro Rius	Defensa y Justicia	
3 July 2019 (Note: Deal agreed on 21 June 2019)	RB	Argentina	Emanuel Brítez	Unión Santa Fe	
3 July 2019 (Note: Deal agreed on 21 June 2019)	RW	Uruguay	Diego Zabala	Unión Santa Fe	
5 July 2019	CB	Argentina	Diego Novaretti	Querétaro	
30 July 2019	LB	Argentina	Nicolás Colazo	Boca Juniors	
1 August 2019	CF	Argentina	Lucas Gamba	Huracán	

=== Transfers out ===
Date from	Position	Nationality	Name	To	Ref.
19 June 2019	LM	Uruguay	Washington Camacho	Tijuana	
3 July 2019 (Note: Deal agreed on 27 June 2019)	LB	Argentina	Gonzalo Bettini	Huracán	
3 July 2019 (Note: Deal agreed on 1 July 2019)	CB	Argentina	Marcos Martinich	Temperley	
5 July 2019	CB	Argentina	Luciano Recalde	Platense	
5 July 2019	CB	Argentina	Nicolás Giménez	San Martín	
12 July 2019	CB	Argentina	Fernando Alarcón	Temperley	
16 July 2019	CB	Argentina	Marco Torsiglieri	Gimnasia y Esgrima	
26 July 2019	LB	Argentina	Facundo Rizzi	Villa Dálmine	
26 July 2019	AM	Argentina	Matías Palavecino	ASIL	
1 August 2019	LB	Chile	Alfonso Parot	Universidad Católica	
31 August 2019	RM	Argentina	Maximiliano Lovera	Olympiacos	

=== Loans in ===
Start date	Position	Nationality	Name	From	End date	Ref.
11 July 2019	CF	Argentina	Sebastián Ribas	Lanús	30 June 2020	

=== Loans out ===
Start date	Position	Nationality	Name	To	End date	Ref.
16 July 2019	CF	Colombia	Duván Vergara	América de Cali	30 June 2020	
24 July 2019	CF	Argentina	Agustín Coscia	Almagro	30 June 2020	
29 July 2019	RM	Argentina	Hernán Da Campo	Chacarita Juniors	30 June 2020	
13 August 2019	RM	Argentina	Andrés Lioi	Korona Kielce	30 June 2020	

== Friendlies ==
=== Pre-season ===
Rosario Central's first pre-season fixture was revealed on 12 June 2019 against city rivals Argentino, set for 15 June, which was followed by the announcement of friendlies in Asunción, Paraguay with Paraguayan Primera División side Olimpia, set for 6 July, and Sol De Mayo; though the latter was later cancelled. On 14 June, Unión Santa Fe scheduled a match with Rosario Central for 13 July. On 21 June, the club announced a behind-closed-doors friendly with Sportivo Las Parejas was set for the following day. They met their reserves on 29 June. A game for 10 July in Arroyo Seco versus Central Córdoba (R) was scheduled. They were set to also face Talleres, but that fixture was later cancelled. Fénix and Arsenal de Sarandí games were added on 16 July.

Win Draw Loss

15 June 2019 Friendly	Rosario Central	2–0	Argentino	Rosario, Argentina
	M. Lovera 29'; N. Ortigoza 40'	Rosario Central; TyC Sports; 80 min. match		Stadium: Estadio Gigante de Arroyito; Attendance: 0 (Note: Behind closed doors.)

22 June 2019 Friendly	Rosario Central	4–1	Sportivo Las Parejas	Rosario, Argentina
	C. Riaño 22'; F. Rinaudo 33'; F. Almada 62'; N. Ortigoza 76'	Rosario Central; Conclusión; 80 min. match	F. Fabello 1'	Stadium: Estadio Gigante de Arroyito; Attendance: 0 (Note: Behind closed doors.)

29 June 2019 Friendly	Rosario Central	2–1	Rosario Central Reserves	Rosario, Argentina
	C. Rius; F. Almada	Rosario Central	F. Frías	Stadium: Estadio Gigante de Arroyito; Attendance: 0 (Note: Behind closed doors.)

6 July 2019 Friendly	Olimpia	1–1 (3–1 p)	Rosario Central	Asunción, Paraguay
16:30 GMT-4	T. Viudez 3'	Rosario Central; TyC Sports	N. Molina 41'	Stadium: Estadio Manuel Ferreira; Referee: Derlis López (Paraguay)
	Penalties
	R. Sánchez (penalty scored); T. Viudez (penalty scored); R. Ovelar (penalty scored)		L. Gil (penalty missed); C. Rius (penalty scored); A. Parot (penalty missed); N. Molina (penalty missed)

Friendly	Sol De Mayo	Cancelled	Rosario Central	Asunción, Paraguay

10 July 2019 Friendly	Central Córdoba (R)	1–2	Rosario Central	Arroyo Seco, Argentina
	L. Esquivel 5'	Rosario Central; La Capital; 80 min. match	L. Gil 25'; D. Zabala 51'	Stadium: Estadio Arroyo Seco; Attendance: 0 (Note: Behind closed doors.); Referee: Nazareno Arasa (Argentina)

13 July 2019 Friendly	Rosario Central	0–0	Unión Santa Fe	Rosario, Argentina
		Rosario Central; Olé; 70 min. match		Stadium: Estadio Gigante de Arroyito; Referee: Nazareno Arasa (Argentina)

13 July 2019 Friendly	Rosario Central	0–0	Unión Santa Fe	Rosario, Argentina
		Rosario Central; Olé; 60 min. match		Stadium: Estadio Gigante de Arroyito

17 July 2019 Friendly	Rosario Central	Cancelled	Talleres	Argentina
		Mundo D - La Voz

17 July 2019 Friendly	Rosario Central	1–0	Fénix	Arroyo Seco, Argentina
	M. Lovera 28' (pen.)	Rosario Central; TyC Sports		Stadium: Estadio Arroyo Seco; Attendance: 0 (Note: Behind closed doors.); Referee: Bruno Cejas (Argentina)

20 July 2019 Friendly	Rosario Central	1–1	Arsenal de Sarandí	Rosario, Argentina
	L. Gil 2'	Rosario Central; TyC Sports	N. Giménez 27'	Stadium: Estadio Gigante de Arroyito

20 July 2019 Friendly	Rosario Central	1–2	Arsenal de Sarandí	Rosario, Argentina
	A. Marinelli 64'	Rosario Central; TyC Sports	E. Cérica 15'; L. Parisi 47'	Stadium: Estadio Gigante de Arroyito

=== Mid-season ===
Rosario met Sarmiento on 6 August in Arroyo Seco. They'd play Argentino on 9 August, just less than two months since their previously meeting on 15 June.

Win Draw Loss

6 August 2019 Friendly	Rosario Central	0–1	Sarmiento	Arroyo Seco, Argentina
		Rosario Central; Grupo La Provincia; 60 min. match	G. Graciani 22'	Stadium: Predio Arroyo Seco

6 August 2019 Friendly	Rosario Central	1–0	Sarmiento	Arroyo Seco, Argentina
	J. Mazzaco 64'	Rosario Central; 60 min. match		Stadium: Predio Arroyo Seco

9 August 2019 Friendly	Rosario Central	2–1	Argentino	Arroyo Seco, Argentina
10:00 GMT-3	S. Ribas 13'; D. Zabala 18'	Rosario Central; Rosario Plus; 70 min. match	M. Recalde 33'	Stadium: Predio Arroyo Seco; Attendance: 0 (Note: Behind closed doors.); Referee: Gerardo Sciretta (Argentina)

9 August 2019 Friendly	Rosario Central	2–0	Argentino	Arroyo Seco, Argentina
	N. Ortigoza 7' (pen.), 24'	Rosario Central; Rosario Plus; 60 min. match		Stadium: Predio Arroyo Seco; Attendance: 0 (Note: Behind closed doors.)

== Competitions ==
=== Primera División ===
==== League table ====
Pos	Team	Pld	W	D	L	GF	GA	GD	Pts
7	Lanús	23	9	9	5	32	29	+3	36
8	San Lorenzo	23	11	3	9	32	30	+2	36
9	Rosario Central	23	9	9	5	31	29	+2	36
10	Newell's Old Boys	23	9	8	6	33	25	+8	35
11	Arsenal	23	9	7	7	37	32	+5	34

Source: AFA
Rules for classification: 1) points; 2) play-off (only if needed to decide championship); 3) goal difference; 4) goals scored; 5) head-to-head points; 6) head-to-head goal difference; 7) head-to-head goals scored.

==== Relegation table ====
Pos	Team	2017–18 Pts	2018–19 Pts	2019–20 Pts	Total Pts	Total Pld	Avg	Relegation
20	Banfield	35	29	4	68	57	1.193	
21	Colón	41	23	4	68	57	1.193	
22	Rosario Central	32	26	9	67	57	1.175	Relegation to Primera B Nacional
23	Central Córdoba (SdE)	0	0	5	5	5	1	Relegation to Primera B Nacional
24	Gimnasia y Esgrima (LP)	27	29	1	57	57	1	Relegation to Primera B Nacional

Source: AFA

==== Results summary ====
Overall								Home						Away					
Pld	W	D	L	GF	GA	GD	Pts	W	D	L	GF	GA	GD	W	D	L	GF	GA	GD
5	2	3	0	7	5	+2	9	1	1	0	2	1	+1	1	2	0	5	4	+1

Last updated: 1 September 2019.
Source: Soccerway

==== Matches ====
The fixtures for the 2019–20 campaign were released on 10 July.

Win Draw Loss

29 July 2019 1	Atlético Tucumán	1–2	Rosario Central	San Miguel de Tucumán, Argentina
21:10 GMT-3	N. Molina 55' (o.g.)	Rosario Central; Infobae; Soccerway	C. Rius 27'; L. Gil 66'	Stadium: Estadio Monumental José Fierro; Referee: Néstor Pitana (Argentina)

3 August 2019 2	Rosario Central	1–0	Talleres	Rosario, Argentina
15:30 GMT-3	D. Zabala 77'	Rosario Central; Infobae; Soccerway		Stadium: Estadio Gigante de Arroyito; Referee: Facundo Tello (Argentina)

17 August 2019 3	San Lorenzo	2–2	Rosario Central	Buenos Aires, Argentina
17:45 GMT-3	F. Belluschi 23'; B. Pittón 42'	Rosario Central; Infobae; Soccerway	C. Riaño 12'; C. Rius 21'	Stadium: Estadio Pedro Bidegain; Referee: Fernando Rapallini (Argentina)

24 August 2019 4	Rosario Central	1–1	Patronato	Rosario, Argentina
17:45 GMT-3	M. Lovera 33'	Rosario Central; Infobae; Soccerway	J. Chicco 65'	Stadium: Estadio Gigante de Arroyito; Referee: Hernán Mastrángelo (Argentina)

1 September 2019 5	Colón	1–1	Rosario Central	Santa Fe, Argentina
11:00 GMT-3	R. Aliendro 19'	Rosario Central; Infobae; Soccerway	C. Riaño 41'	Stadium: Estadio Brigadier General Estanislao López; Referee: Fernando Espinoza (Argentina)

6	Rosario Central	–	Newell's Old Boys	Rosario, Argentina
				Stadium: Estadio Gigante de Arroyito

=== Copa Argentina ===
Win Draw Loss

	–
00:00 GMT-3

=== Copa de la Superliga ===
Win Draw Loss

	–
00:00 GMT-3

== Squad statistics ==
=== Appearances and goals ===
No.	Pos.	Nationality	Name	League		Cup		League Cup		Continental		Total		Discipline		Ref															
No.	Pos.	Nationality	Name	Apps	Goals	Apps	Goals	Apps	Goals	Apps	Goals	Apps	Goals	Yellow card	Red card	Ref															
1	GK	Argentina	Jeremías Ledesma	5	0	0	0	0	0	—		5	0	0	0																
2	CB	Argentina	Matías Caruzzo	5	0	0	0	0	0	—		5	0	3	0																
4	RB	Argentina	Nahuel Molina	5	0	0	0	0	0	—		5	0	0	0																
5	CM	Argentina	Leonardo Gil	5	1	0	0	0	0	—		5	1	1	0																
6	CB	Argentina	Miguel Barbieri	5	0	0	0	0	0	—		5	0	1	0																
7	LM	Argentina	Joaquín Pereyra	0(4)	0	0	0	0	0	—		0(4)	0	0	0																
8	LM	Argentina	Agustín Allione	0	0	0	0	0	0	—		0	0	0	0																
9	CF	Argentina	Claudio Riaño	5	2	0	0	0	0	—		5	2	0	0																
10	DM	Paraguay	Néstor Ortigoza	0(1)	0	0	0	0	0	—		0(1)	0	0	0																
11	AM	Argentina	Jonás Aguirre	0(1)	0	0	0	0	0	—		0(1)	0	0	0																
12	RW	Argentina	Ciro Rius	5	2	0	0	0	0	—		5	2	0	0																
14	CB	Argentina	Diego Novaretti	0	0	0	0	0	0	—		0	0	0	0																
15	CM	Argentina	Rodrigo Villagra	0	0	0	0	0	0	—		0	0	0	0																
16	RB	Argentina	Rodrigo González	0	0	0	0	0	0	—		0	0	0	0																
17	FW	Argentina	Alan Marinelli	0	0	0	0	0	0	—		0	0	0	0																
18	MF	Argentina	Francesco Lo Celso	0	0	0	0	0	0	—		0	0	0	0																
20	CF	Argentina	Fernando Zampedri	0	0	0	0	0	0	—		0	0	0	0																
21	DM	Argentina	Fabián Rinaudo	5	0	0	0	0	0	—		5	0	2	0																
22	RW	Uruguay	Diego Zabala	5	1	0	0	0	0	—		5	1	1	0																
23	CF	Uruguay	Sebastián Ribas	0(5)	0	0	0	0	0	—		0(5)	0	0	0																
25	CM	Argentina	Emmanuel Ojeda	0	0	0	0	0	0	—		0	0	0	0																
28	CF	Argentina	Lucas Gamba	1(3)	0	0	0	0	0	—		1(3)	0	1	0																
30	GK	Argentina	Marcelo Miño	0	0	0	0	0	0	—		0	0	0	0																
31	GK	Argentina	Josué Ayala	0	0	0	0	0	0	—		0	0	0	0																
32	CB	Argentina	Facundo Almada	0	0	0	0	0	0	—		0	0	0	0																
33	RB	Argentina	Emanuel Brítez	5	0	0	0	0	0	—		5	0	2	0																
35	DF	Argentina	Iván Antúnez	0	0	0	0	0	0	—		0	0	0	0																
37	CF	Colombia	Duván Vergara	0	0	0	0	0	0	—		0	0	0	0																
39	RW	Argentina	Oscar Retamal	0	0	0	0	0	0	—		0	0	0	0																
–	LM	Argentina	Diego Becker	0	0	0	0	0	0	—		0	0	0	0																
–	LW	Argentina	Pablo Becker	0	0	0	0	0	0	—		0	0	0	0																
–	LM	Argentina	Nicolás Colazo	0	0	0	0	0	0	—		0	0	0	0																
–	CF	Argentina	Agustín Coscia	0	0	0	0	0	0	—		0	0	0	0																
–	RM	Argentina	Hernán Da Campo	0	0	0	0	0	0	—		0	0	0	0																
–	LB	Argentina	Elías Gómez	0	0	0	0	0	0	—		0	0	0	0																
–	CM	Argentina	Maximiliano González	0	0	0	0	0	0	—		0	0	0	0																
–	RW	Argentina	Germán Herrera	0	0	0	0	0	0	—		0	0	0	0																
–	CB	Paraguay	José Leguizamón	0	0	0	0	0	0	—		0	0	0	0																
–	RM	Argentina	Andrés Lioi	0	0	0	0	0	0	—		0	0	0	0																
–	CF	Argentina	Rodrigo Migone	0	0	0	0	0	0	—		0	0	0	0																
–	AM	Argentina	Joel López Pissano	0	0	0	0	0	0	—		0	0	0	0																
–	CF	Argentina	Agustín Maziero	0	0	0	0	0	0	—		0	0	0	0																
–	AM	Argentina	Leonel Rivas	0	0	0	0	0	0	—		0	0	0	0																
–	CF	Argentina	Marco Ruben	0	0	0	0	0	0	—		0	0	0	0																
Own goals				—	0	—	0	—	0	—		—	0	—	—	—															
Players who left during the season
24	LB	Chile	Alfonso Parot	0(1)	0	0	0	0	0	—		0(1)	0	0	0																
34	RM	Argentina	Maximiliano Lovera	4	1	0	0	0	0	—		4	1	0	0		–	LM	Uruguay	Washington Camacho	0	0	0	0	0	0	—	0	0	0	0

Statistics accurate as of 1 September 2019.

=== Goalscorers ===
Rank	Pos	No.	Nat	Name	League	Cup	League Cup	Continental	Total	Ref
1	RW	12	Argentina	Ciro Rius	2	0	0	–	2	
1	CF	9	Argentina	Claudio Riaño	2	0	0	–	2	
2	CM	5	Argentina	Leonardo Gil	1	0	0	–	1	
2	RW	22	Uruguay	Diego Zabala	1	0	0	–	1	
2	RW	34	Argentina	Maximiliano Lovera	1	0	0	–	1	
Own goals					0	0	0	–	0	
Totals					7	0	0	–	7	—
