= Cristian Villagra =

Argentine footballer

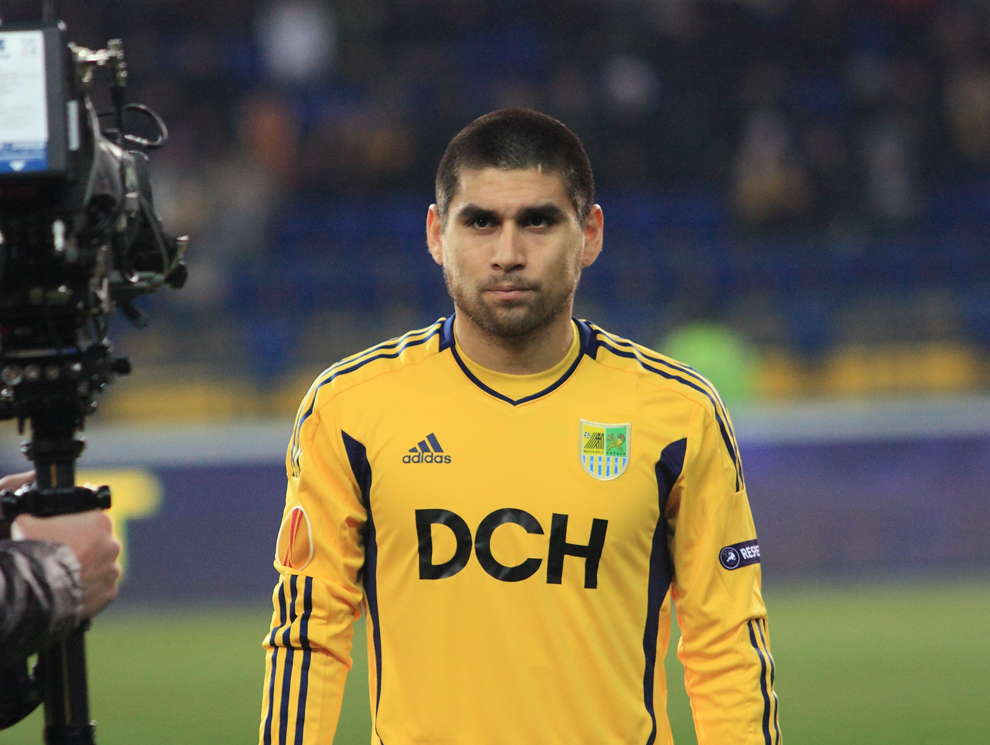

Personal information
- Full name: Cristian Carlos Villagra
- Date of birth: 27 December 1985 (age 40)
- Place of birth: Morteros, Argentina
- Height: 1.78 m (5 ft 10 in)
- Position: Left-back

Youth career
- 9 de Julio

Senior career*
Years	Team	Apps	(Gls)
2003–2004	9 de Julio		
2005–2006	Rosario Central	30	(1)
2007–2010	River Plate	93	(3)
2010–2015	Metalist Kharkiv	101	(5)
2015–2017	Rosario Central	49	(1)
2017–2018	Atlético Tucumán	16	(0)
2018–2021	9 de Julio		

International career
2010	Argentina	1	(0)
- * Club domestic league appearances and goals

Cristian Carlos Villagra (born 27 December 1985) is an Argentine former professional footballer who played as a left-back.

== Club career ==
Villagra began his career with Rosario Central in 2005, his form bringing him to the attention of River Plate. During the 2007 January transfer window, Villagra was signed by River as part of deal that also saw Juan Ojeda and Marco Rubén switch from Rosario Central to River Plate.

== International career ==
Villagra was called up to the national team for a friendly against Scotland on 19 November 2008, however he did not leave the bench. On 5 May 2010 he finally made his first appearance for the national team in a friendly against Haiti.

== Personal life ==
Villagra's brother, Rodrigo, is also a professional footballer. Their brother, Gonzalo, died from leukemia in June 2018; after Cristian had donated bone marrow in the preceding February.

== Titles ==
Season	Club	Title
Clausura 2008	River Plate	Argentine Primera
