= Ezequiel Rodríguez =

Ezequiel Rodríguez may refer to:

- Ezequiel Rodríguez (actor), Argentine actor
- Ezequiel Rodríguez (footballer, born 1980), forward for Universitario de Sucre
- Ezequiel Rodríguez (footballer, born 1990), midfielder for Club Atlético Tigre
- Ezequiel Rodríguez (footballer, born 1996), forward for Rosario Central
