= Retamal =

Retamal is a Spanish surname. Notable people with the surname include:

- Daniel Retamal (born 1995), Chilean footballer
- Julio Retamal Favereau (1933–2025), Chilean historian, genealogist, and philosopher
- Oscar Retamal (born 1998), Argentine footballer
- Pol Retamal (born 1999), Spanish sprinter
- Víctor Retamal (born 1998), Chilean footballer

== See also ==
- Retamal de Llerena, a municipality in the Spanish province of Badajoz
- Sergio Morales Retamal, mayor of the Chilean commune of Pichilemu in the 1950s
