= Rodrigo Villagra =

Argentine footballer (born 2001)

Personal information
- Full name: Rodrigo Román Villagra
- Date of birth: 14 February 2001 (age 25)
- Place of birth: Morteros, Argentina
- Height: 1.78 m (5 ft 10 in)
- Position: Midfielder

Team information
- Current team: Internacional (on loan from CSKA Moscow)
- Number: 5

Youth career
- –2019: Rosario Central

Senior career*
Years	Team	Apps	(Gls)
2019–2021	Rosario Central	25	(0)
2021–2024	Talleres	95	(0)
2024–2025	River Plate	25	(0)
2025–	CSKA Moscow	8	(0)
2026–	→ Internacional (loan)	10	(0)

International career
2019	Argentina U20	1	(0)
- * Club domestic league appearances and goals as of 8 April 2026

Rodrigo Román Villagra (born 14 February 2001) is an Argentine professional footballer who plays as a midfielder for Brazilian club Internacional, on loan from Russian Premier League club CSKA Moscow.

== Club career ==
Villagra came through the youth ranks of Rosario Central. Diego Cocca was the manager who selected him for his professional debut, as the midfielder featured for the full duration of a Copa Libertadores group stage defeat to Libertad on 4 April 2019; he had previously been on the substitutes bench in the same competition a month prior versus Grêmio.

On 5 August 2021, Villagra joined fellow league club Talleres de Córdoba on a deal until the end of 2025.

On 3 February 2024, he signed for River Plate of Argentina for 4 years.

On 6 March 2025, Villagra signed a contract with CSKA Moscow in Russia until the end of 2028, with an option to extend for one more year. On 21 January 2026, he was loaned to Internacional in Brazil.

== International career ==
In March 2019, Villagra received a call-up to the Argentina U20s ahead of friendlies in Murcia, Spain.

== Personal life ==
Villagra has a footballing brother, Cristian, who also started his senior career with Rosario Central. Their other brother, Gonzalo, died in June 2018 following a battle with leukemia.

== Career statistics ==
As of 7 December 2025

Appearances and goals by club, season and competition
Club	Season	League			National cup (Note: Includes Copa Argentina, Russian Cup)		Continental		Other		Total	
Club	Season	Division	Apps	Goals	Apps	Goals	Apps	Goals	Apps	Goals	Apps	Goals
Rosario Central	2018–19	Primera División	1	0	0	0	3 (Note: Appearances in Copa Libertadores)	0	2 (Note: One appearance in Supercopa Argentina, one appearance in Copa de la Superliga)	0	6	0
Rosario Central	2019–20	Primera División	1	0	1 (Note: 2019–20 Copa Argentina was suspended due to COVID-19 pandemic in Argentina and completed in 2021, both of the entries refer to that tournament)	0	—		10 (Note: Appearances in Copa de la Liga Profesional)	0	12	0
Rosario Central	2021	Primera División	1	0	0	0	6 (Note: Appearances in Copa Sudamericana)	0	12	0	19	0
Rosario Central	Total		3	0	1	0	9	0	24	0	37	0
Talleres	2021	Primera División	20	0	4	0	—		—		24	0
Talleres	2022	Primera División	25	0	6	0	10	0	11	0	52	0
Talleres	2023	Primera División	26	0	4	0	–		13	0	43	0
Talleres	Total		71	0	14	0	10	0	24	0	119	0
River Plate	2024	Primera División	15	0	2	0	8	0	11 (Note: Ten appearances Copa de la Liga Profesional, one appearance in Supercopa Argentina)	0	36	0
CSKA Moscow	2024–25	Russian Premier League	0	0	0	0	—		—		0	0
CSKA Moscow	2025–26	Russian Premier League	8	0	3	0	—		—		11	0
CSKA Moscow	Total		8	0	3	0	0	0	0	0	11	0
Career total			97	0	20	0	27	0	59	0	203	0
