= Alfani =

Alfani is a surname. Notable people with the surname include:

- Domenico Alfani (c. 1483–c. 1553), Italian painter
- Orazio Alfani (c. 1510–1583), Italian painter, son of Domenico
- Renzo Alfani (born 1996), Argentine footballer
