= Banega =

Banega is a surname. Notable people with the surname include:

- Éver Banega (born 1988), Argentine footballer
- Félix Banega (born 1996), Argentine footballer
- Tiago Banega (born 1999), Argentine footballer

== See also ==
- Banegas
