= Favereau =

Favereau is a surname. Notable people with the surname include:

- Julio Retamal Favereau (1933–2025), Chilean historian, genealogist, and philosopher
- Marie Favereau, French historian and writer
