= Matías Mansilla =

Matías Mansilla may refer to:

- Matías Mansilla (goalkeeper) (born 1996), Argentine football goalkeeper for Unión Santa Fe
- Matías Mansilla (midfielder) (born 1996), Argentine football midfielder for Alvarado
