= Lioi =

Lioi is a surname. Notable people with the surname include:

- Andrés Lioi (born 1997), Argentine football midfielder
- Sara Elizabeth Lioi (born 1960), United States District Judge
