= Nahuel Quiroga =

Argentine footballer

Personal information
- Full name: Mario Nahuel Quiroga
- Date of birth: 5 August 1991 (age 35)
- Place of birth: Rojas, Argentina
- Height: 1.80 m (5 ft 11 in)
- Position: Defender

Team information
- Current team: Colegiales

Youth career
- Jorge Newbery de Rojas
- 1998–2005: El Huracan
- San Lorenzo
- Lanús
- Academia Griffa
- 2009: Sarmiento

Senior career*
Years	Team	Apps	(Gls)
2009–2014	Sarmiento		
2012–2013	→ Villa Belgrano (loan)	21	(0)
2014–2017	Rosario Central	0	(0)
2015	→ Sarmiento (loan)	7	(0)
2016	→ Instituto (loan)	6	(0)
2018	San José	0	(0)
2018	Industrial Avilés		
2019	Real Tomayapo		
2019–	Colegiales	0	(0)
- * Club domestic league appearances and goals as of 00:25, 16 August 2019 (UTC)

Mario Nahuel Quiroga (born 5 August 1991) is an Argentine professional footballer who plays as a defender for Colegiales.

== Career ==
Quiroga started his youth career with local club Jorge Newbery de Rojas, prior to a seven-year spell with El Huracan. Further periods with San Lorenzo, Lanús and Academia Griffa followed before he joined Sarmiento in 2009; he was promoted into the senior squad soon after. In 2012, Quiroga was loaned to Torneo Argentino C's Villa Belgrano for two seasons. He returned to Primera B Nacional side Sarmiento for 2013–14, a season which yielded one goal in ten matches. In July 2014, Rosario Central signed Quiroga. Although, after not featuring in his first six months for Rosario Central, he was loaned back to Sarmiento in 2015.

Sarmiento, now an Argentine Primera División team, selected Quiroga eight times before allowing him to return to his parent club. 2016 saw him leave Rosario Central on loan again, this time joining Instituto in Primera B Nacional. Seven appearances followed in all competitions. In January 2018, Quiroga left Argentine football to play for San José of the Bolivian Primera División. He departed months later without playing, in part due to contractual issues; which later brought a lawsuit. Quiroga signed for Liga Nacional B's Industrial Avilés in July 2018. In early 2019, Quiroga joined fellow second tier team Real Tomayapo.

Quiroga went back to Argentina with Colegiales on 1 July 2019.

== Career statistics ==
As of 16 August 2019.

Club statistics
Club	Season	League			Cup		League Cup		Continental		Other		Total	
Club	Season	Division	Apps	Goals	Apps	Goals	Apps	Goals	Apps	Goals	Apps	Goals	Apps	Goals
Rosario Central	2014	Argentine Primera División	0	0	0	0	—		0	0	0	0	0	0
Rosario Central	2015	Argentine Primera División	0	0	0	0	—		—		0	0	0	0
Rosario Central	2016	Argentine Primera División	0	0	0	0	—		0	0	0	0	0	0
Rosario Central	2016–17	Argentine Primera División	0	0	0	0	—		—		0	0	0	0
Rosario Central	2017–18	Argentine Primera División	0	0	0	0	—		0	0	0	0	0	0
Rosario Central	Total		0	0	0	0	—		0	0	0	0	0	0
Sarmiento (loan)	2015	Argentine Primera División	7	0	1	0	—		—		0	0	8	0
Instituto (loan)	2016	Primera B Nacional	6	0	1	0	—		—		0	0	7	0
San José	2018	Bolivian Primera División	0	0	—		—		0	0	0	0	0	0
Colegiales	2019–20	Primera B Metropolitana	0	0	0	0	—		—		0	0	0	0
Career total			13	0	2	0	—		0	0	0	0	15	0

== Honours ==
Rosario Central

- Primera B Metropolitana: 2011–12
