= 2017–18 Rosario Central season =

Rosario Central
2017–18 season
- President: Raúl Broglia
- Manager: Paolo Montero (until 10 November 2017); Leonardo Fernández (int.) (from 11 November 2017)
- Stadium: Estadio Gigante de Arroyito
- Primera División: 21st
- 2016–17 Copa Argentina: Semi-finals
- 2017–18 Copa Argentina: Round of 64
- Top goalscorer: League: Fernando Zampedri (4); All: Fernando Zampedri (6)
Home colours	Away colours

The 2017–18 season is Rosario Central's 6th consecutive season in the top-flight of Argentine football. The season covers the period from 1 July 2017 to 30 June 2018.

== Current squad ==
As of 26 September 2017.

Note: Flags indicate national team as defined under FIFA eligibility rules; some limited exceptions apply. Players may hold more than one non-FIFA nationality.

No.	Pos.	Nation	Player
4	DF	ARG	Paulo Ferrari
8	MF	ARG	Federico Carrizo
9	FW	ARG	Marco Ruben
11	MF	ARG	José Fernández
15	DF	URU	Washington Camacho
16	MF	ARG	Mauricio Martínez
17	FW	ARG	Germán Herrera
18	DF	ARG	Renzo Alfani
20	MF	ARG	Gustavo Colman
21	GK	ARG	Diego Rodríguez
22	MF	ARG	Pedro Ojeda
24	MF	ARG	Diego Becker
27	DF	PAR	José Leguizamón
28	FW	ARG	Agustín Coscia
30	GK	ARG	Jeremías Ledesma
34	FW	ARG	Maximiliano Lovera
35	MF	ARG	Joaquín Pereyra

No.	Pos.	Nation	Player
37	DF	ARG	Leonel Rivas
38	FW	ARG	Joel Reinoso
39	DF	ARG	Tomás Zanotti
—	DF	CHI	Alfonso Parot
—	DF	ARG	Elías Gómez
—	GK	ARG	Emilio Di Fulvio
—	FW	ARG	Ezequiel Rodríguez
—	DF	ARG	Fernando Tobio (on loan from Palmeiras)
—	FW	ARG	Fernando Zampedri
—	MF	ARG	Hernán Da Campo
—	MF	ARG	Leonardo Gil
—	DF	ARG	Luciano Recalde
—	MF	ARG	Marcelo Ortiz (on loan from Boca Unidos)
—	MF	ARG	Maximiliano González
—	DF	ARG	Nahuel Quiroga
—	FW	ARG	Pablo Becker
—	MF	URU	Santiago Romero (on loan from Nacional)

=== Out on loan ===
Note: Flags indicate national team as defined under FIFA eligibility rules; some limited exceptions apply. Players may hold more than one non-FIFA nationality.

No.	Pos.	Nation	Player
7	FW	ARG	Fabián Bordagaray (at Defensa y Justicia until 30 June 2018)
13	FW	ARG	Rodrigo Migone (at Patronato until 30 June 2018)
26	MF	ARG	Matías Mansilla (at Quilmes until 30 June 2018)
40	MF	ARG	Félix Banega (at San Martín until 30 June 2018)
—	DF	ARG	Fernando Alarcón (at Villa Dálmine until 30 June 2018)

No.	Pos.	Nation	Player
—	FW	ARG	Ijiel Protti (at Chacarita Juniors until 30 June 2018)
—	MF	ARG	Jonás Aguirre (at Puebla until 31 December 2017)
—	DF	ARG	Marco Torsiglieri (at Racing Club until 31 December 2017)
—	MF	ARG	Marcos Martinich (at Villa Dálmine until 30 June 2018)

== Transfers ==
=== In ===
Date	Pos.	Name	From	Fee
1 July 2017	DF	(Uruguay) Washington Camacho	(Argentina) Racing Club	Undisclosed
12 July 2017	DF	(Chile) Alfonso Parot	(Chile) Universidad Católica	Undisclosed
13 July 2017	FW	(Argentina) Fernando Zampedri	(Argentina) Atlético Tucumán	Undisclosed
27 July 2017	MF	(Argentina) Leonardo Gil	(Argentina) Estudiantes	Undisclosed
30 July 2017	GK	(Argentina) Diego Rodríguez	(Argentina) Independiente	Undisclosed

=== Out ===
Date	Pos.	Name	To	Fee
1 July 2017	DF	(Argentina) Javier Pinola	(Argentina) River Plate	Undisclosed
1 July 2017	DF	(Argentina) Víctor Salazar	(Argentina) San Lorenzo	Undisclosed
3 July 2017	MF	(Argentina) Damián Musto	(Mexico) Tijuana	Undisclosed
14 August 2017	FW	(Argentina) Walter Acuña	(Argentina) Juventud Unida	Undisclosed
17 August 2017	FW	(Argentina) César Delgado	(Argentina) Central Córdoba	Undisclosed
17 August 2017	DF	(Argentina) Cristian Villagra	(Argentina) Atlético Tucumán	Undisclosed
17 August 2017	DF	(Switzerland) Dylan Gissi	(Argentina) Defensa y Justicia	Undisclosed

=== Loan in ===
Date from	Date to	Pos.	Name	From
16 July 2017	30 June 2018	MF	(Uruguay) Santiago Romero	(Uruguay) Nacional
5 August 2017	30 June 2018	MF	(Argentina) Marcelo Ortiz	(Argentina) Boca Unidos
23 August 2017	30 June 2018	DF	(Argentina) Fernando Tobio	(Brazil) Palmeiras

=== Loan out ===
Date from	Date to	Pos.	Name	To
11 July 2017	30 June 2018	MF	(Argentina) Félix Banega	(Argentina) San Martín
29 July 2017	30 June 2018	DF	(Argentina) Fernando Alarcón	(Argentina) Villa Dálmine
6 August 2017	30 June 2018	FW	(Argentina) Rodrigo Migone	(Argentina) Patronato
14 August 2017	30 June 2018	MF	(Argentina) Matías Mansilla	(Argentina) Quilmes
23 August 2017	30 June 2018	FW	(Argentina) Ijiel Protti	(Argentina) Chacarita Juniors
24 August 2017	30 June 2018	FW	(Argentina) Fabián Bordagaray	(Argentina) Defensa y Justicia
5 September 2017	30 June 2018	MF	(Argentina) Marcos Martinich	(Argentina) Villa Dálmine

== Friendlies ==
Win Draw Loss

=== Pre-season ===
2 August 2017 Friendly	Patronato (Argentina)	0–0	(Argentina) Rosario Central	Arroyo Seco, Argentina
		Report

2 August 2017 Friendly	Patronato (Argentina)	5–1	(Argentina) Rosario Central	Arroyo Seco, Argentina
	A. Contrera 5', 30'; M. Quiroga 9'; D. González 32'; T. Spinelli 55'	Report	S. Romero 7'

8 August 2017 Friendly	Rosario Central (Argentina)	0–2	(Argentina) Vélez Sarsfield	Arroyo Seco, Argentina
		Report	G. Díaz; F. Andrada

8 August 2017 Friendly	Rosario Central (Argentina)	2–1	(Argentina) Vélez Sarsfield	Arroyo Seco, Argentina
	Goal	Report	Goal

== Primera División ==
=== League table ===
Pos	Team	Pld	W	D	L	GF	GA	GD	Pts	Qualification
18	San Martín (SJ)	27	9	6	12	30	36	−6	33	
19	Patronato	27	8	9	10	26	32	−6	33	
20	Rosario Central	27	8	8	11	30	41	−11	32	Qualification for Copa Libertadores group stage (Note: Rosario Central qualified for the Copa Libertadores group stage by winning the 2017–18 Copa Argentina.)
21	Newell's Old Boys (Note: Newell's Old Boys were deducted one point for debts owed to former players. Originally AFA partially accepted the appeal by Newell's Old Boys reducing the penalty from three points to one point but a new appeal by Lanús overturned the decision. Finally, on 28 June 2019 CAS gave back two points to Newell´s Old Boys reducing the penalty to one point again.)	27	8	6	13	23	28	−5	29	
22	Lanús	27	6	11	10	20	37	−17	29	

Source: AFA
Rules for classification: 1) points; 2) play-off (only if needed to decide championship); 3) goal difference; 4) goals scored; 5) head-to-head points; 6) head-to-head goal difference; 7) head-to-head goals scored.

=== Results by matchday ===
Matchday	1	2	3	4	5	6	7	8	9	10	11	12	13	14	15	16	17	18	19	20	21	22	23	24	25	26	27
Ground	A	H	A	H	A	H	A	H	A	H	A	H	A														
Result	D	D	D	L	L	L	D	L	W	W	P	W															
Position	15	18	18	23	26	26	24	27	24	23	23	21															

Updated to match(es) played on 12 December 2017. Source: Soccerway
A = Away; H = Home; W = Win; D = Draw; L = Loss; P = Postponed

26 August 2017 1	Colón (Argentina)	1–1	(Argentina) Rosario Central	Santa Fe, Argentina
16:15	T. Sandoval 87'	Report	W. Camacho 84'	Stadium: Estadio Brigadier General Estanislao López; Referee: Juan Pompei (Argentina)

10 September 2017 2	Rosario Central (Argentina)	0–0	(Argentina) San Lorenzo	Rosario, Argentina
16:05		Report		Stadium: Estadio Gigante de Arroyito; Referee: Patricio Loustau (Argentina)

18 September 2017 3	Temperley (Argentina)	1–1	(Argentina) Rosario Central	Turdera, Argentina
21:05	M. Villasanti 56'	Report	F. Zampedri 22'	Stadium: Estadio Alfredo Beranger; Referee: Diego Abal (Argentina)

24 September 2017 4	Rosario Central (Argentina)	0–4	(Argentina) Banfield	Rosario, Argentina
16:05		Report	D. Cvitanich 21', 31' (pen.); P. Mouche 58'; M. Sperduti 79'	Stadium: Estadio Gigante de Arroyito; Referee: Mauro Vigliano (Argentina)

1 October 2017 5	San Martín (Argentina)	3–1	(Argentina) Rosario Central	San Juan, Argentina
14:05	E. Agüero 62'; F. Barcelo 64'; L. Ardente 88' (pen.)	Report	F. Zampedri 45'	Stadium: Estadio Ingeniero Hilario Sánchez; Referee: Juan Pompei (Argentina)

14 October 2017 6	Rosario Central (Argentina)	1–3	(Argentina) Argentinos Juniors	Rosario, Argentina
14:05	F. Zampedri 90+3'	Report	B. Romero 30', 82'; N. González 89'	Stadium: Estadio Gigante de Arroyito; Referee: Pablo Echavarría (Argentina)

30 October 2017 7	Tigre (Argentina)	1–1	(Argentina) Rosario Central	Buenos Aires, Argentina
21:05	L. Menossi 16'	Report	M. Ruben 80'	Stadium: Estadio José Dellagiovanna; Referee: Néstor Pitana (Argentina)

4 November 2017 8	Rosario Central (Argentina)	0–1	(Argentina) Atlético Tucumán	Rosario, Argentina
18:05		Report	G. Núñez 53'	Stadium: Estadio Gigante de Arroyito; Referee: Andrés Merlos (Argentina)

20 November 2017 9	Talleres (Argentina)	0–1	(Argentina) Rosario Central	Córdoba, Argentina
21:30		Report	F. Zampedri 62'	Stadium: Estadio Mario Alberto Kempes; Referee: Jorge Baliño (Argentina)

26 November 2017 10	Rosario Central (Argentina)	1–0	(Argentina) Boca Juniors	Rosario, Argentina
21:30	M. Ruben 4'	Report		Stadium: Estadio Gigante de Arroyito; Referee: Patricio Loustau (Argentina)

2 December 2017 11	Independiente (Argentina)	Postponed	(Argentina) Rosario Central	Avellaneda, Argentina
19:15		Report		Stadium: Estadio Libertadores de América; Referee: Federico Beligoy (Argentina)

10 December 2017 12	Rosario Central (Argentina)	1–0	(Argentina) Newell's Old Boys	Rosario, Argentina
17:00	G. Herrera 3'	Report		Stadium: Estadio Gigante de Arroyito; Referee: Néstor Pitana (Argentina)

January 2018 13	Gimnasia y Esgrima (Argentina)	–	(Argentina) Rosario Central	Buenos Aires, Argentina
		Report		Stadium: Estadio Juan Carmelo Zerillo

== Copa Argentina ==
Win Draw Loss

3 September 2017 R32	Rosario Central (Argentina)	2–1	(Argentina) Deportivo Riestra	Buenos Aires, Argentina
15:15	F. Zampedri 56'; J. Leguizamón 73'	Report	E. Gómez 66' (o.g.)	Stadium: Estadio Diego Armando Maradona; Referee: Hernán Mastrángelo (Argentina)

27 September 2017 R16	Rosario Central (Argentina)	1–0	(Argentina) Boca Juniors	Mendoza, Argentina
21:10	M. Martínez 26'	Report		Stadium: Estadio Malvinas Argentinas; Referee: Fernando Rapallini (Argentina)

23 October 2017 QF	Godoy Cruz (Argentina)	2–3	(Argentina) Rosario Central	Avellaneda, Argentina
18:00	S. García 7'; F. Angileri 43'	Report	W. Camacho 61'; F. Carrizo 76'; F. Zampedri 88'	Stadium: Estadio Presidente Juan Domingo Perón; Referee: Ariel Penel (Argentina)

10 November 2017 SF	Atlético Tucumán (Argentina)	0–0 (3–1 p)	(Argentina) Rosario Central	Formosa, Argentina
20:00		Report		Stadium: Estadio Antonio Romero; Referee: Federico Beligoy (Argentina)
	Penalties
	D. Barbona (penalty scored); F. Grahl (penalty scored); F. Álvarez (penalty scored)		F. Carrizo (penalty scored); M. Ruben (penalty missed); D. Rodríguez (penalty missed); M. Martínez (penalty missed)
