= Pablo Becker =

Argentine footballer (born 1993)

Personal information
- Full name: Pablo Ignacio Becker
- Date of birth: 29 April 1993 (age 33)
- Place of birth: Los Quirquinchos, Argentina
- Height: 1.72 m (5 ft 7 1/2 in)
- Position: Forward

Youth career
- Rosario Central

Senior career*
Years	Team	Apps	(Gls)
2010–2019	Rosario Central	51	(2)
2012	→ San Telmo (loan)	6	(0)
2016–2017	→ Defensa y Justicia (loan)	3	(0)
2018	→ Deportes Antofagasta (loan)	8	(1)
2020–2021	Aldosivi	15	(1)
2022	Defensores Belgrano	0	(0)
- * Club domestic league appearances and goals

Pablo Ignacio Becker (born 29 April 1993) is an Argentine retired professional footballer who played as a forward.

== Career ==
Rosario Central moved Becker into their first-team squad in 2010. After being an unused substitute for Primera B Nacional fixtures versus Tiro Federal and Unión Santa Fe, Becker made his senior bow on 4 December 2010 during a home defeat to Gimnasia y Esgrima. In 2012, San Telmo of Primera B Metropolitana loaned Becker. Six appearances followed during 2011–12. He returned to Rosario Central in July 2012, subsequently scoring on his first start back on 8 September against Nueva Chicago. He scored two goals in seventeen games in 2012–13 as the club won promotion to the Primera División.

He made thirty-nine appearances and scored one goal in his first four seasons in the top-flight. On 30 August 2016, Becker joined fellow Primera División side Defensa y Justicia on loan. He featured just three times for Defensa y Justicia. Chile's Deportes Antofagasta completed the loan signing of Becker in June 2018.

On 9 January 2022, Becker signed with Defensores Belgrano. However, 12 days later, 27-year old Becker decided to end his career due to "personal reasons".

== Personal life ==
His brother, Diego Becker, is also a professional footballer.

== Career statistics ==
As of 6 September 2018.

Club statistics
Club	Season	League			Cup (Note: Includes the Copa Argentina)		League Cup		Continental (Note: Includes the Copa Libertadores and Copa Sudamericana)		Other		Total	
Club	Season	Division	Apps	Goals	Apps	Goals	Apps	Goals	Apps	Goals	Apps	Goals	Apps	Goals
Rosario Central	2010–11	Primera B Nacional	1	0	0	0	—		—		0	0	1	0
Rosario Central	2011–12	Primera B Nacional	0	0	0	0	—		0	0	0	0	0	0
Rosario Central	2012–13	Primera B Nacional	17	2	1	0	—		—		0	0	18	2
Rosario Central	2013–14	Argentine Primera División	8	0	0	0	—		—		0	0	8	0
Rosario Central	2014	Argentine Primera División	16	0	5	0	—		2 (Note: Two appearances in 2014 Copa Sudamericana)	1 (Note: One goal in 2014 Copa Sudamericana)	0	0	23	1
Rosario Central	2015	Argentine Primera División	1	0	1	0	—		—		0	0	2	0
Rosario Central	2016	Argentine Primera División	3	0	0	0	—		3 (Note: Three appearances in 2016 Copa Libertadores)	0	0	0	6	0
Rosario Central	2016–17	Argentine Primera División	0	0	0	0	—		—		0	0	0	0
Rosario Central	2017–18	Argentine Primera División	3	0	0	0	—		0	0	0	0	3	0
Rosario Central	2018–19	Argentine Primera División	0	0	0	0	—		—		0	0	0	0
Rosario Central	Total		49	2	7	0	—		5	1	0	0	61	3
San Telmo (loan)	2011–12	Primera B Metropolitana	6	0	—		—		—		0	0	6	0
Defensa y Justicia (loan)	2016–17	Argentine Primera División	3	0	0	0	—		—		0	0	3	0
Deportes Antofagasta (loan)	2018	Chilean Primera División	4	0	0	0	—		—		0	0	4	0
Career total			59	2	7	0	—		5	1	0	0	71	3

== Honours ==
Rosario Central

- Primera B Nacional: 2012–13
