= Banegas =

Banegas is a Spanish/Italian surname. Notable people with the surname include:

- Ángel Darío Banegas (born 1969), Honduran cartoonist and politician
- Cristina Banegas (born 1948), Argentine actress

== See also ==
- Banega
