= Diego Becker =

Argentine footballer (born 1997)

Personal information
- Full name: Diego Eugenio Becker
- Date of birth: 24 November 1997 (age 28)
- Place of birth: Los Quirquinchos, Argentina
- Height: 1.69 m (5 ft 6 1/2 in)
- Position: Midfielder

Team information
- Current team: Tristán Suárez

Youth career
- Rosario Central

Senior career*
Years	Team	Apps	(Gls)
2017–2021	Rosario Central	9	(0)
2019–2020	→ Alvarado (loan)	14	(2)
2020–2021	→ Tigre (loan)	24	(2)
2022	Instituto	17	(0)
2023	Atlanta	26	(4)
2024	Ethnikos Achna	11	(0)
2024–2026	Alvarado	38	(3)
2026–	Tristán Suárez	3	(0)
- * Club domestic league appearances and goals as of 17:15, 6 May 2026 (UTC)

Diego Eugenio Becker (born 24 November 1997) is an Argentine professional footballer who plays as a midfielder for Tristán Suárez.

== Club career ==
Becker was promoted into the first-team of Rosario Central during the 2016–17 Argentine Primera División campaign. He was an unused substitute on three occasions before making his professional debut in June 2017 against San Martín, featuring for the final twenty-seven minutes of a 1–1 draw. After twelve appearances for Rosario up until the end of 2018–19, Becker departed on loan for the 2019–20 campaign to Primera B Nacional's Alvarado. Becker scored for the first time on 13 October 2019 as he netted twice in a 3–2 victory over Estudiantes.

After a few loan spells, Becker finally left Rosario in January 2022 to join Instituto on a permanently deal until the end of 2022.

== International career ==
Becker was called up for Argentina U20 training in October 2016.

== Personal life ==
His brother, Pablo Becker, is also a professional footballer.

== Career statistics ==
As of 10 July 2020.

Club statistics
Club	Season	League			Cup		League Cup		Continental		Other		Total	
Club	Season	Division	Apps	Goals	Apps	Goals	Apps	Goals	Apps	Goals	Apps	Goals	Apps	Goals
Rosario Central	2016–17	Primera División	1	0	0	0	—		—		0	0	1	0
Rosario Central	2017–18	Primera División	2	0	0	0	—		0	0	0	0	2	0
Rosario Central	2018–19	Primera División	6	0	2	0	0	0	1 (Note: Appearance(s) in the Copa Libertadores)	0	0	0	9	0
Rosario Central	2019–20	Primera División	0	0	0	0	0	0	0	0	0	0	0	0
Rosario Central	Total		9	0	2	0	0	0	1	0	0	0	12	0
Alvarado (loan)	2019–20	Primera B Nacional	14	2	0	0	—		—		0	0	14	2
Career total			23	2	2	0	0	0	1	0	0	0	26	0

== Honours ==
Rosario Central

- Copa Argentina: 2017–18
