= Alianza de Cutral Có =

Argentine football club

- Full name: Club Social y Deportivo Alianza
- Nicknames: El Gallo; El Celeste
- Founded: April 15 1979
- Ground: Estadio Alvaro Pedro Ducás, Cutral Có, Neuquén Province
- Capacity: 16,500
- League: Torneo Argentino B
Home colours

Club Social y Deportivo Alianza, usually known as Alianza de Cutral Có, is an Argentine football club based in the city of Cutral Có in Neuquén Province. The team currently plays in the Torneo Regional Federal Amateur, the regionalised 4th level of Argentine football league system.
