= Emmanuel Ojeda =

Argentine footballer

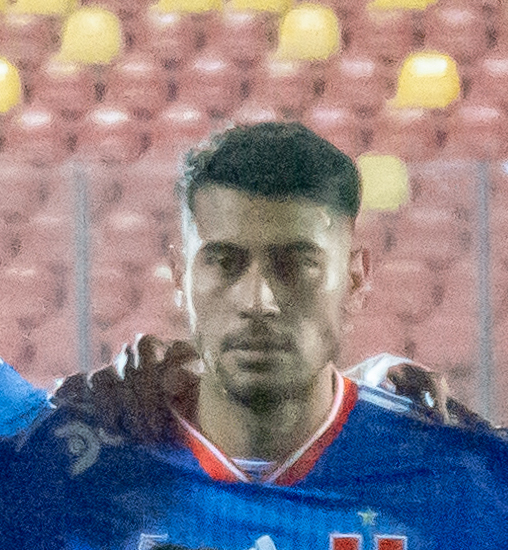
- Ojeda with Universidad de Chile in 2023

Personal information
- Full name: Pedro Emmanuel Ojeda
- Date of birth: 5 November 1997 (age 29)
- Place of birth: Goya, Argentina
- Height: 1.80 m (5 ft 11 in)
- Position: Midfielder

Team information
- Current team: Huracán
- Number: 20

Youth career
- Rosario Central

Senior career*
Years	Team	Apps	(Gls)
2016–2022	Rosario Central	59	(3)
2022–2025	Universidad de Chile	49	(1)
2025	→ Huracán (loan)	28	(2)
2026–	Huracán	15	(0)

International career
2016–2017	Argentina U20	6	(0)
- * Club domestic league appearances and goals as of 17:39, 6 July 2026 (UTC)

Pedro Emmanuel Ojeda (born 5 November 1997) is an Argentine professional footballer who plays as a midfielder for Huracán.

== Career ==
=== Club ===
Ojeda started with Rosario Central. He was promoted into their first-team squad in May 2016 as a substitute for an Argentine Primera División match with Quilmes, though went unused during a 1–1 draw. Five months later, in October, Ojeda made his professional debut in an away tie versus Huracán; which was one of three appearances in 2016–17.

In June 2022, he moved out of Argentina and joined Universidad de Chile.

In January 2026, Ojeda permanently moved to Huracán after his stint during 2025.

=== International ===
Ojeda represented the Argentina U20s at the 2017 South American U-20 Championship in Ecuador, winning two caps (against Peru and Uruguay) as his nation finished fourth place. A year previous, he was selected for the 2016 COTIF Tournament; featuring four times.

== Career statistics ==
As of 22 September 2018.

Club statistics
Club	Season	League			Cup (Note: Includes the Copa Argentina)		League Cup		Continental (Note: Includes the Copa Libertadores and Copa Sudamericana)		Other		Total	
Club	Season	Division	Apps	Goals	Apps	Goals	Apps	Goals	Apps	Goals	Apps	Goals	Apps	Goals
Rosario Central	2016	Primera División	0	0	0	0	—		0	0	0	0	0	0
Rosario Central	2016–17	Primera División	3	0	0	0	—		—		0	0	3	0
Rosario Central	2017–18	Primera División	0	0	0	0	—		0	0	0	0	0	0
Rosario Central	2018–19	Primera División	0	0	0	0	—		—		0	0	0	0
Career total			3	0	0	0	—		0	0	0	0	3	0

== Honours ==
Rosario Central

- Copa Argentina: 2017–18

Universidad de Chile

- Copa Chile: 2024
