= Andrés Lioi =

Argentine footballer

Personal information
- Date of birth: 7 March 1997 (age 29)
- Place of birth: Rosario, Argentina
- Height: 1.75 m (5 ft 9 in)
- Position: Right midfielder

Team information
- Current team: Chaco For Ever

Youth career
- Renato Cesarini
- Rosario Central

Senior career*
Years	Team	Apps	(Gls)
2018–2021	Rosario Central	21	(3)
2019–2020	→ Korona Kielce (loan)	13	(0)
2019	→ Korona Kielce II (loan)	5	(0)
2021	San Luis	10	(1)
2021	→ Iberia (loan)	9	(2)
2022–2024	Deportivo Madryn	49	(3)
2024–2025	Deportivo Maipú	12	(0)
2025–2026	Colegiales	12	(0)
2026–	Chaco For Ever	6	(0)
- * Club domestic league appearances and goals as of 17:54, 24 April 2026 (UTC)

Andrés Lioi (born 7 March 1997) is an Argentine professional footballer who plays as a right midfielder for Chaco For Ever.

== Career ==
Lioi played for Renato Cesarini in his youth career before joining Rosario Central, signing his first professional contract with them in November 2017. He was promoted into the first-team midway through the 2017–18 season, making his professional debut on 24 January 2018 in a 1–1 draw with Independiente. Four appearances later, on 17 February, Lioi scored a hat-trick during a 5–0 league win at the Estadio Gigante de Arroyito against Olimpo. After twenty-eight matches across two campaigns for Rosario, Lioi departed on loan on 13 August 2019 to Polish Ekstraklasa outfit Korona Kielce.

After making twelve appearances for Korona, as well as five outings for their reserve team, Lioi's loan was extended until July - from 30 June - after the end of the 2019–20 campaign was delayed due to the COVID-19 pandemic.

== Career statistics ==
As of 4 November 2020.

Club statistics
Club	Season	League			Cup		League Cup		Continental		Other		Total	
Club	Season	Division	Apps	Goals	Apps	Goals	Apps	Goals	Apps	Goals	Apps	Goals	Apps	Goals
Rosario Central	2017–18	Primera División	10	3	0	0	—		0	0	0	0	10	3
Rosario Central	2018–19	Primera División	11	0	7	0	0	0	0	0	0	0	18	0
Rosario Central	2019–20	Primera División	0	0	0	0	0	0	0	0	0	0	0	0
Rosario Central	2020–21 (Note: Soccerway counts Copa de la Liga Profesional appearances as league appearances.)	Primera División	0	0	0	0	0	0	0	0	0	0	0	0
Rosario Central	Total		21	3	7	0	0	0	0	0	0	0	28	3
Korona Kielce (loan)	2019–20	Ekstraklasa	13	0	0	0	—		—		0	0	13	0
Career total			34	3	7	0	0	0	0	0	0	0	41	3

== Honours ==
Rosario Central

- Copa Argentina: 2017–18
