= Facundo Rizzi =

Argentine footballer

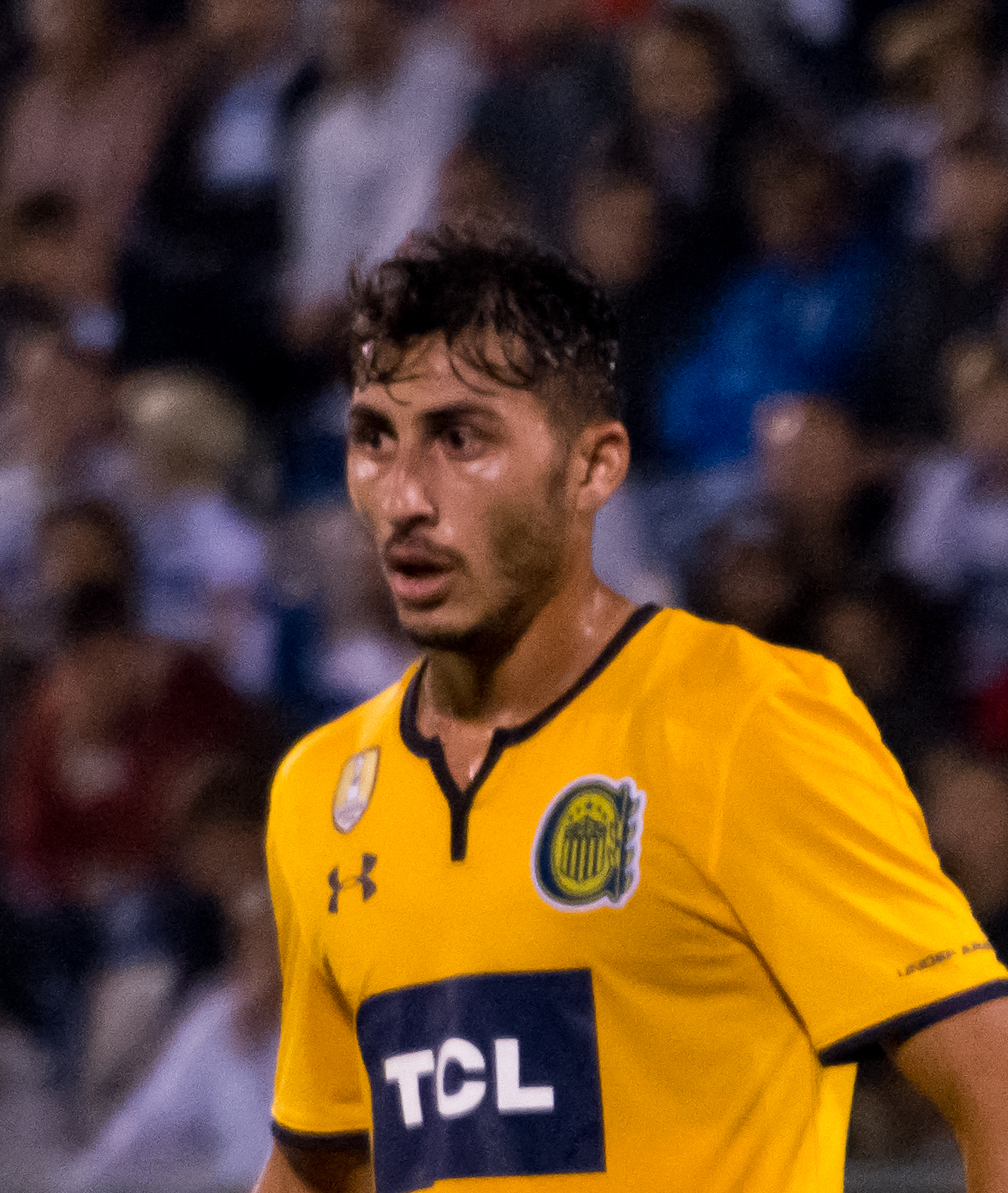

Personal information
- Full name: Facundo Emanuel Rizzi
- Date of birth: 28 August 1997 (age 29)
- Place of birth: Villa Gobernador Gálvez, Argentina
- Height: 1.75 m (5 ft 9 in)
- Position: Left-back

Team information
- Current team: Güemes

Youth career
- –2016: Rosario Central

Senior career*
Years	Team	Apps	(Gls)
2016–2019	Rosario Central	4	(0)
2019–2021	Villa Dálmine	34	(0)
2022–2023	Gimnasia Jujuy	32	(0)
2023	Argeș Pitești	26	(0)
2024–2025	Gimnasia Jujuy	29	(0)
2025–2026	Nueva Chicago	9	(0)
2026–	Güemes	4	(0)
- * Club domestic league appearances and goals as of 16:56, 29 April 2026 (UTC)

Facundo Emanuel Rizzi (born 28 August 1997) is an Argentine professional footballer who plays as a left-back for Güemes.

== Career ==
Rizzi is a graduate of the Rosario Central youth system, being promoted to the first-team during the 2016–17 Primera División season. He featured in back-to-back league fixtures in December 2016, making his professional debut on 11 December in a home defeat to Lanús; with the secondary appearance coming against Belgrano seven days later. In July 2019, after a total of ten matches for Rosario, Rizzi departed to Primera B Nacional with Villa Dálmine.

On 11 January 2022, Rizzi joined Gimnasia Jujuy.

In January 2023, Rizzi joined Romanian Liga I side FC Argeș Pitești on an eighteen-month contract. On 27 October 2023, the club announced that Rizzi's contract had been terminated by mutual agreement.

== Career statistics ==
As of 23 October 2023.

Club statistics
Club	Season	League			Cup		League Cup		Continental		Other		Total	
Club	Season	Division	Apps	Goals	Apps	Goals	Apps	Goals	Apps	Goals	Apps	Goals	Apps	Goals
Rosario Central	2016–17	Primera División	2	0	1	0	—		—		0	0	3	0
Rosario Central	2017–18	Primera División	0	0	0	0	—		0	0	0	0	0	0
Rosario Central	2018–19	Primera División	2	0	0	0	1	0	4 (Note: Appearance(s) in the Copa Libertadores)	0	0	0	7	0
Rosario Central	Total		4	0	1	0	1	0	4	0	0	0	10	0
Villa Dálmine	2019–20	Primera Nacional	3	0	0	0	—		—		—		3	0
Villa Dálmine	2020	Primera Nacional	7	0	0	0	—		—		—		7	0
Villa Dálmine	2021	Primera Nacional	24	0	0	0	—		—		—		24	0
Villa Dálmine	Total		34	0	0	0	0	0	0	0	0	0	34	0
Gimnasia Jujuy	2022	Primera Nacional	32	0	3	0	—		—		—		35	0
Argeș Pitești	2022–23	Liga I	16	0	1	0	—		—		—		17	0
Argeș Pitești	2023–24	Liga II	10	0	1	0	—		—		—		11	0
Argeș Pitești	Total		26	0	2	0	—		—		—		28	0
Career total			96	0	6	0	1	0	4	0	0	0	107	0
