= Nahuel Molina =

Argentine footballer (born 1998)

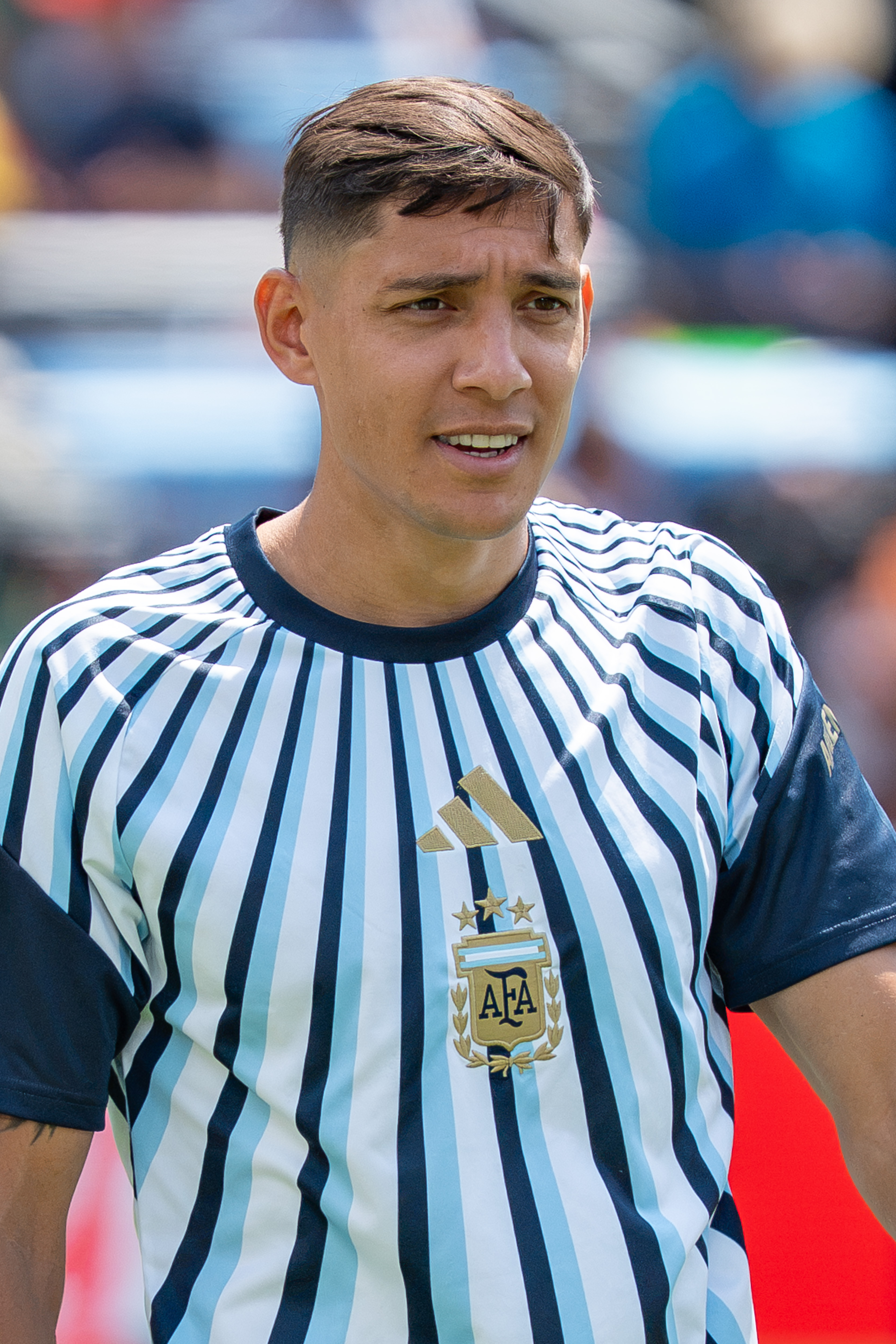
- Molina with Argentina in 2026

Personal information
- Full name: Nahuel Molina Lucero
- Date of birth: 6 April 1998 (age 28)
- Place of birth: Embalse, Córdoba, Argentina
- Height: 1.75 m (5 ft 9 in)
- Position: Right-back

Team information
- Current team: Roma
- Number: 20

Youth career
- Boca Juniors

Senior career*
Years	Team	Apps	(Gls)
2016–2020	Boca Juniors	8	(0)
2018	→ Defensa y Justicia (loan)	17	(1)
2019	→ Rosario Central (loan)	22	(1)
2020–2022	Udinese	64	(9)
2022–2026	Atlético Madrid	119	(8)
2026–	Roma	10	(0)

International career^{‡}
2017	Argentina U20	6	(0)
2021–	Argentina	65	(1)
Medal record
Men's football
Representing Argentina
FIFA World Cup
Winner	2022 Qatar
Runner-up	2026 Canada–Mexico–US
Copa América
Winner	2021 Brazil
Winner	2024 United States
CONMEBOL–UEFA Cup of Champions
Winner	2022 England
- * Club domestic league appearances and goals as of 21 November 2026 ‡ National team caps and goals as of 19 July 2026

Nahuel Molina Lucero (born 6 April 1998) is an Argentine professional footballer who plays as a right-back for Serie A club Roma and the Argentina national team.

Molina started his career at Boca Juniors in Argentina. He moved to Udinese in Italy in 2020 before joining Atlético Madrid in 2022. Molina was part of the Argentina squads for the 2022, and 2026 World Cups, winning the 2022 edition where he started the final. He was also part of the squads at the 2021, and 2024 Copa Américas, which Argentina both won.

== Club career ==
Molina trained in the Barça Juniors Luján sports project, an FC Barcelona project in Argentina, which even led him to travel to Barcelona to train with the lower sections of FC Barcelona. In 2012, the Juniors Luján project was integrated into the youth ranks of CA Boca Juniors, and he continued his training in this club.

On 18 February 2016, Molina made his first team debut for Boca Juniors in a league game against San Martín de San Juan, playing the full game. In January 2018, he was loaned out to Defensa y Justicia for the rest of the year.

On 15 September 2020, Molina joined Udinese on a free transfer until 2025.

On 28 July 2022, he joined Atlético Madrid on a five-year contract, for a reported fee of €10 million and €5 million in variables. He scored his first goal for the club in a 2–1 away win over Rayo Vallecano on 9 April 2023.

On 12 August 2026, Molina signed for Serie A side Roma.

== International career ==
On 3 June 2021, Molina debuted for the Argentina national team in a World Cup qualifier against Chile, coming on as a substitute for Juan Foyth in the 81st minute.

In the 2022 FIFA World Cup quarter-final match against the Netherlands on 9 December 2022, Molina scored his first goal for Argentina, starting in six matches for Argentina as first choice right-back scoring one goal and providing one assist throughout the tournament en route to become champions.

In June 2024, Molina was included in Lionel Scaloni's final 26-man Argentina squad for the 2024 Copa América.

On 27 May 2026, Molina was selected in the 26-man squad for the 2026 FIFA World Cup. Following Argentina's loss to Spain in the final, Molina and midfielder Leandro Paredes received condemnation for their violent conduct towards opposing players after the final whistle. On 29 July 2026, FIFA opened proceedings against Molina, investigating him for two counts of assault and one count of unsporting behaviour.

== Career statistics ==
=== Club ===
As of match played 21 November 2026

Appearances and goals by club, season and competition
Club	Season	League			National cup (Note: Includes Copa Argentina, Coppa Italia, Copa del Rey)		Continental		Other		Total	
Club	Season	Division	Apps	Goals	Apps	Goals	Apps	Goals	Apps	Goals	Apps	Goals
Boca Juniors	2016–17	Argentine Primera División	8	0	—		1 (Note: Appearance(s) in Copa Libertadores)	0	—		9	0
Defensa y Justicia (loan)	2017–18	Argentine Primera División	14	1	2	0	7 (Note: Appearances in Copa Sudamericana)	0	—		23	1
Defensa y Justicia (loan)	2018–19	Argentine Primera División	3	0	—		—		—		3	0
Defensa y Justicia (loan)	Total		17	1	2	0	7	0	—		26	1
Rosario Central (loan)	2018–19	Argentine Primera División	6	0	1	0	6	0	—		13	0
Rosario Central (loan)	2019–20	Argentine Primera División	16	1	2	0	—		—		18	1
Rosario Central (loan)	Total		22	1	3	0	6	0	—		31	1
Udinese	2020–21	Serie A	29	2	2	0	—		—		31	2
Udinese	2021–22	Serie A	35	7	2	1	—		—		37	8
Udinese	Total		64	9	4	1	—		—		68	10
Atlético Madrid	2022–23	La Liga	33	4	4	0	6 (Note: Appearances in UEFA Champions League)	0	—		43	4
Atlético Madrid	2023–24	La Liga	30	2	5	0	10	0	1 (Note: Appearance in Supercopa de España)	0	46	2
Atlético Madrid	2024–25	La Liga	30	0	6	0	8	1	2 (Note: Appearances in FIFA Club World Cup)	0	46	1
Atlético Madrid	2025–26	La Liga	26	2	6	0	13	0	1	0	46	2
Atlético Madrid	Total		119	8	21	0	37	1	4	0	181	9
Roma	2026–27	Serie A	10	0	0	0	3	1	—		13	1
Career total			240	19	30	1	54	2	4	0	328	22

=== International ===
As of match played 19 July 2026

Appearances and goals by national team and year
National team	Year	Apps	Goals
Argentina	2021	13	0
Argentina	2022	14	1
Argentina	2023	8	0
Argentina	2024	13	0
Argentina	2025	8	0
Argentina	2026	9	0
Total		65	1

As of match played 19 July 2026. Scores and results list Argentina's goal tally first, score column indicates score after each Molina goal.

List of international goals scored by Nahuel Molina
No.	Date	Venue	Cap	Opponent	Score	Result	Competition
1	9 December 2022	Lusail Iconic Stadium, Lusail, Qatar	25	Netherlands	1–0	2–2 (a.e.t.) (4–3 p)	2022 FIFA World Cup

== Honours ==
Atlético Madrid

- Copa del Rey runner-up: 2025–26

Argentina

- FIFA World Cup: 2022; runner-up: 2026
- Copa América: 2021, 2024
- CONMEBOL–UEFA Cup of Champions: 2022
