= 9 de Julio de Morteros =

Argentine football club

9 de Julio
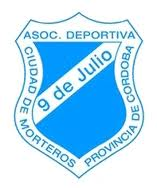
- Full name: Asociación Deportiva; Club 9 de Julio de Morteros
- Nickname(s): Nueve; Celeste
- Founded: 25 February 1942; 83 years ago
- Ground: Estadio La Villa, Morteros, Córdoba, Argentina
- Capacity: 9,000
- League: Torneo Federal A
Home colours	Away colours

Asociación Deportiva 9 de Julio (more often referred as 9 de Julio de Morteros) is an Argentine football club based in the city of Morteros, in the north east of the Córdoba Province, Argentina. The squad currently plays in Zone B of the regionalised 3rd level of Argentine football Torneo Federal A.

== See also ==
- List of football clubs in Argentina
- Argentine football league system
