= Félix Banega =

Argentine footballer

Personal information
- Full name: Félix Adrián Banega
- Date of birth: 19 October 1996 (age 30)
- Place of birth: Rosario, Argentina
- Position: Midfielder

Youth career
- 2002–2005: Unión y Progreso
- 2005–2016: Rosario Central

Senior career*
Years	Team	Apps	(Gls)
2016–2019	Rosario Central	3	(0)
2017–2018	→ San Martín (loan)	1	(0)
2019–2020	A.C. Colina	?	(?)
2019	→ Central Norte (loan)	1	(0)
2020–	Independiente Rivadavia	11	(0)
- * Club domestic league appearances and goals as of 2 May 2021

Félix Adrián Banega (born 19 October 1996) is an Argentine professional footballer who plays as a midfielder.

== Career ==
Banega played for Unión y Progreso in his youth career from 2002, before departing in 2005 to join Rosario Central. Eleven years later, on 15 May 2016, he made his senior debut with Rosario Central during an Argentine Primera División draw with Quilmes. He appeared twice in the following season, 2016–17, prior to leaving the club on loan in July 2017. San Martín temporarily signed Banega for the 2017–18 campaign. His first appearance for San Martín arrived against Estudiantes on 28 October.

In April 2019, having terminated his Rosario contract two months early, Banega headed to Chile with Segunda División club A.C. Colina. However, months later, Banega returned to Argentina with Central Norte of Torneo Federal A. He made one appearance, an eight-minute cameo against Defensores de Pronunciamiento on 5 October, before departing at the end of the year.

== Career statistics ==
As of 26 August 2020.

Club statistics
Club	Season	League			Cup		League Cup		Continental		Other		Total	
Club	Season	Division	Apps	Goals	Apps	Goals	Apps	Goals	Apps	Goals	Apps	Goals	Apps	Goals
Rosario Central	2016	Primera División	1	0	0	0	—		0	0	0	0	1	0
Rosario Central	2016–17	Primera División	2	0	0	0	—		—		0	0	2	0
Rosario Central	2017–18	Primera División	0	0	0	0	—		0	0	0	0	0	0
Rosario Central	2018–19	Primera División	0	0	0	0	—		—		0	0	0	0
Rosario Central	Total		3	0	0	0	—		0	0	0	0	3	0
San Martín (loan)	2017–18	Primera División	1	0	0	0	—		—		0	0	1	0
Central Norte	2019–20	Torneo Federal A	1	0	0	0	—		—		0	0	1	0
Career total			5	0	0	0	—		0	0	0	0	5	0
