= Ezequiel Rodríguez (footballer, born 1980) =

Argentine footballer

Personal information
- Full name: Ezequiel Alberto Rodríguez
- Date of birth: 19 March 1980 (age 46)
- Place of birth: Santiago del Estero, Argentina
- Position: Forward

Senior career*
Years	Team	Apps	(Gls)
2000–2003	Almirante Brown	81	(5)
2003–2004	Deportivo Armenio	20	(1)
2005	Fancesa		
2005–2008	Universitario de Sucre	86	(12)
2009	Central Córdoba	10	(3)
2012–2014	Sportivo Rivadavia	54	(5)
2014	Deportivo Patagones	4	(1)
2014	Maronese	1	(0)
2015	Deportivo Patagones	14	(1)
Total		270	(28)
- * Club domestic league appearances and goals

Ezequiel Alberto Rodríguez (born 19 March 1980) is an Argentine former professional footballer who played as a forward.

== Career ==
Rodríguez started his career with Almirante Brown, scoring five times in eighty-one Primera B Metropolitana matches between 2000 and 2003. He departed in 2003 to play for fellow Primera B Metropolitana team Deportivo Armenio, subsequently featuring twenty times and scoring once in the 2003–04 Primera B Metropolitana campaign. 2005 saw Rodríguez leave Argentine football for three years in Bolivia. He had a short spell with Fancesa of Liga Nacional B, before joining Universitario de Sucre in the Bolivian Primera División months later. He scored twelve goals in three years, winning the 2008 Apertura in his final season.

He returned to Argentina in 2009 to play for Central Córdoba. He went on to play in ten matches for them in Torneo Argentino A, scoring three goals against Sportivo Desamparados, Deportivo Maipú and Gimnasia y Esgrima respectively. Between 2012 and 2015, Rodríguez spent time with Torneo Argentino B/Torneo Federal B sides Sportivo Rivadavia, Deportivo Patagones and Maronese; he had two separate spells with Deportivo Patagones, who he played for last in 2015.

== Career statistics ==
As of 1 May 2018.

Club statistics
Club	Season	League			Cup (Note: Includes the Copa Argentina)		League Cup		Continental		Other		Total	
Club	Season	Division	Apps	Goals	Apps	Goals	Apps	Goals	Apps	Goals	Apps	Goals	Apps	Goals
Deportivo Armenio	2003–04	Primera B Metropolitana	20	1	0	0	—		—		0	0	20	1
Central Córdoba	2008–09	Torneo Argentino A	10	3	0	0	—		—		0	0	10	3
Deportivo Patagones	2015	Torneo Federal B	14	1	0	0	—		—		0	0	14	1
Career total			44	5	0	0	—		—		0	0	44	5

== Honours ==
Universitario de Sucre

- Bolivian Primera División: 2008 Apertura
