= Alan Marinelli =

Argentine footballer (born 1999)

Personal information
- Full name: Alan Nicolás Marinelli
- Date of birth: 7 April 1999 (age 27)
- Place of birth: Rosario, Argentina
- Height: 1.74 m (5 ft 9 in)
- Position: Winger

Team information
- Current team: Slovácko
- Number: 9

Youth career
- 2010–2019: Rosario Central

Senior career*
Years	Team	Apps	(Gls)
2019–2024	Rosario Central	51	(7)
2022	→ Estudiantes (loan)	9	(0)
2023–2024	→ Sarmiento (loan)	13	(0)
2024	→ Platense (loan)	5	(0)
2024–2025	Académico de Viseu	26	(3)
2025–	Slovácko	22	(1)

International career^{‡}
2018	Argentina U20	7	(2)
- * Club domestic league appearances and goals as of 25 May 2026 ‡ National team caps and goals as of 15 October 2018

Alan Nicolás Marinelli (born 7 April 1999) is an Argentine professional footballer who plays as a winger for Czech First League club Slovácko.

== Club career ==
Marinelli is a product of Rosario Central's youth system, having joined in 2010. Towards the end of the 2018–19 season under manager Diego Cocca, Marinelli made his bow in professional football on 20 April 2019 during a Copa de la Superliga win away to Aldosivi; though their opponents progressed on aggregate. He scored a brace in a Copa de la Liga Profesional second phase victory over Patronato on 14 December 2020.

In February 2022, Marinelli joined Estudiantes on loan for one year with a purchase option. However, the spell was cut short and Marinelli was recalled on 11 July 2022.

On 29 July 2025, Marinelli signed a two-year contract with Czech First League club Slovácko as a free agent.

== International career ==
In 2018, Marinelli represented Argentina's U20s at the L'Alcúdia International Tournament in Spain. They won the competition, as Marinelli scored the winning goal in the final against Russia. He also received call-ups to train against the senior team.

== Career statistics ==
As of 25 November 2023.

Appearances and goals by club, season and competition
Club	Division	League			Cup		Continental		Total	
Club	Division	Season	Apps	Goals	Apps	Goals	Apps	Goals	Apps	Goals
Rosario Central	Primera División	2018-19	—		1	0	—		1	0
Rosario Central	Primera División	2019-20	4	0	1	0	—		5	0
Rosario Central	Primera División	2020	—		8	5	—		8	5
Rosario Central	Primera División	2021	16	1	10	0	8	1	34	2
Rosario Central	Primera División	2022	14	1	1	0	—		15	1
Rosario Central	Primera División	2023	0	0	0	0	—		0	0
Rosario Central	Total		34	2	21	5	8	1	63	8
Estudiantes	Primera División	2022	2	0	8	0	4	0	14	0
Sarmiento	Primera División	2023	—		13	0	—		13	0
Career total			36	2	42	5	12	1	90	8

== Honours ==
Argentina U20

- L'Alcúdia International Tournament: 2018
