= Ciro Rius =

Argentine footballer

Personal information
- Full name: Ciro Pablo Rius Aragallo
- Date of birth: 27 October 1988 (age 38)
- Place of birth: Ramallo, Argentina
- Height: 1.74 m (5 ft 9 in)
- Position: Right winger

Team information
- Current team: Arsenal Sarandí
- Number: 11

Youth career
- 2006: River Plate
- 2007–2009: Argentinos Juniors

Senior career*
Years	Team	Apps	(Gls)
2009–2016	Argentinos Juniors	58	(6)
2013	→ Godoy Cruz (loan)	5	(0)
2013–2014	→ Aldosivi (loan)	23	(4)
2014–2019	Defensa y Justicia	104	(10)
2016–2017	→ Lanús (loan)	8	(0)
2019–2020	Rosario Central	23	(4)
2020–2021	Defensa y Justicia	11	(0)
2021–2022	Atlético Tucumán	36	(0)
2023	Central Córdoba SdE	25	(1)
2023–2024	Platense	14	(1)
2025–	Arsenal Sarandí	12	(0)
- * Club domestic league appearances and goals as of 17:55, 26 May 2025 (UTC)

Ciro Pablo Rius Aragallo (born 27 October 1988) is an Argentine footballer who plays for Arsenal Sarandí in the Primera Nacional as a second striker or winger.

== Career ==
=== Club career ===
Rius made his breakthrough into the Argentinos Juniors first team in a 0–2 home defeat against Arsenal on 7 February 2009. He was a non-playing member of the Argentinos squad that won the Clausura 2010 championship, but since then he has become a regular first team player. He scored his first goal for the club in a 0–2 win against Boca Juniors.

On 11 June 2019, Rius signed a 3-year contract with Rosario Central, but on 12 August 2020, he came back to Defensa y Justicia for free.
