= Facundo Almada =

Argentine footballer

Personal information
- Full name: Facundo Ezequiel Almada
- Date of birth: 10 July 1998 (age 28)
- Place of birth: Rosario, Argentina
- Height: 1.79 m (5 ft 10 in)
- Position: Centre-back

Team information
- Current team: Puebla
- Number: 5

Youth career
- Rosario Central

Senior career*
Years	Team	Apps	(Gls)
2018–2023	Rosario Central	47	(4)
2023	→ Mazatlán (loan)	29	(3)
2024–2026	Mazatlán	75	(8)
2026–	Puebla	13	(2)
- * Club domestic league appearances and goals as of 21 October 2026

Facundo Ezequiel Almada (born 10 July 1998) is an Argentine professional footballer who plays as a centre-back for Liga MX club Puebla.

== Career ==
Almada began his senior career with Rosario Central. Edgardo Bauza picked Almada on the substitutes bench for a Primera División fixture with Vélez Sarsfield on 3 December 2018, though didn't select the defender to come on in a 2–0 loss. Bauza soon left the club, with Paulo Ferrari replacing him at the helm and subsequently awarding Almada his professional debut from the start against Belgrano in March 2019.

On 5 June 2026, Almada signed with Puebla.

== Career statistics ==
As of 3 March 2019.

Appearances and goals by club, season and competition
Club	Season	League			Cup		Continental		Other		Total	
Club	Season	Division	Apps	Goals	Apps	Goals	Apps	Goals	Apps	Goals	Apps	Goals
Rosario Central	2018–19	Primera División	1	0	0	0	0	0	0	0	1	0
Career total			1	0	0	0	0	0	0	0	1	0
