= Marco Ruben =

Argentine footballer (born 1986)

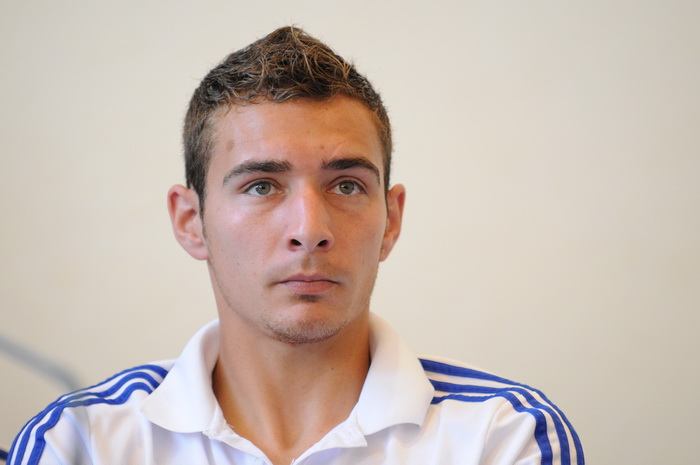
- Ruben in 2012

Personal information
- Full name: Marco Gastón Ruben Rodríguez
- Date of birth: 26 October 1986 (age 40)
- Place of birth: Capitán Bermúdez, Argentina
- Height: 1.79 m (5 ft 10 in)
- Position: Striker

Team information
- Current team: Rosario Central
- Number: 9

Youth career
- Rosario Central

Senior career*
Years	Team	Apps	(Gls)
2004–2006	Rosario Central	77	(20)
2007	River Plate	28	(7)
2008–2012	Villarreal	65	(14)
2008–2009	→ Recreativo (loan)	43	(7)
2009–2010	Villarreal B	31	(18)
2012–2016	Dynamo Kyiv	11	(1)
2013–2014	→ Évian (loan)	25	(1)
2014	→ Tigres (loan)	10	(0)
2015–2016	→ Rosario Central (loan)	41	(28)
2016–2022	Rosario Central	95	(35)
2019	→ Athletico Paranaense (loan)	23	(4)
2023–2024	Deportivo Maldonado	13	(3)
2024	Rosario Central	17	(1)
2026–	Rosario Central	1	(0)

International career
2011	Argentina	1	(1)
- * Club domestic league appearances and goals as of 17:13, 10 July 2026 (UTC)

Marco Gastón Ruben Rodríguez (born 26 October 1986) is an Argentine professional footballer who plays for Rosario Central as a striker.

He spent the better part of his 18-year career with Rosario Central, scoring 105 goals in all competitions. He also played in Spain, Ukraine, France, Mexico and Brazil.

Ruben won one cap for the Argentina national team, in 2011.

== Club career ==
Born in Capitán Bermúdez, Santa Fe Province, Ruben started his career with Rosario Central in 2004. In the 2006 Apertura tournament he scored seven goals in 17 matches to be the team's top scorer, and this brought him to the attention of several major clubs in Argentina and Europe, with Club Atlético River Plate eventually winning the battle and paying US$7.5 million for his signature, alongside teammates Juan Ojeda and Cristian Villagra.

After a short spell, Manuel Pellegrini's Villarreal CF purchased Ruben for $7 million in January 2008, immediately loaning him to fellow La Liga side Recreativo de Huelva until 30 June. He made his league debut in Spain on the 27th, appearing as a substitute and being booked in the 3–1 home loss against Getafe CF.

The loan was renewed for the 2008–09 season, but Ruben scored just three times as the Andalusians were relegated. After returning to Villarreal, he spent the vast majority of the year with the reserves, which were having their first experience in the Segunda División.

In mid-January 2010, Villarreal agreed to sell Ruben to Wigan Athletic of the Premier League after the player had helped the reserves to the fourth place with nine league goals, good enough for joint-third. Although the player agreed personal terms with Wigan, the clubs could not reach an agreement and the deal fell through.

Ruben played his first league game with Villarreal's main squad on 7 February 2010, more than two years after his purchase, appearing six minutes at RCD Mallorca (1–0 loss). On 9 January of the following year, while starting in the place of injured Nilmar, he scored against Real Madrid to make it 2–1 for the Valencians (his first goal for the first team), who were eventually defeated at the Santiago Bernabéu Stadium (4–2).

On 13 July 2012, Ruben signed a five-year contract with Ukrainian club FC Dynamo Kyiv for a €14 million fee. He scored his first goal for his new team on 3 November, opening a 2–0 home win over SC Tavriya Simferopol.

After a spell in the French Ligue 1 with Thonon Évian F.C. where he failed to meet expectations as that particular type of football did not suit his style, Ruben joined Liga MX side Tigres UANL on 18 June 2014 on a one-year loan from Dynamo. He made his competitive debut on 9 July, playing the whole of a 4–1 defeat to Monarcas Morelia in the Supercopa MX.

Ruben returned to Rosario Central on 24 December 2014, initially on a temporary deal. He scored a career-best 21 goals in his first year (24 in all competitions) and was named team captain.

On 11 January 2019, Ruben joined Brazil's Club Athletico Paranaense on a year-long loan. He retired on 7 May 2022 at the age of 35 after scoring for Rosario in the 3–1 win over Estudiantes de La Plata at Estadio Gigante de Arroyito, as the club's third all-time scorer with 105 goals.

Ruben came out of retirement in November 2023, moving to Deportivo Maldonado of the Uruguayan Primera División. The following 26 May, he again returned to Rosario Central. On his return, he scored a 94th-minute equaliser in a 1–1 draw against Club Atlético Lanús.

Ruben retired for a second time on 14 December 2024, having helped the hosts defeat Club Atlético Belgrano 2–1. In February 2026, however, he returned to Rosario again.

== International career ==
Ruben made his debut for Argentina in an unofficial pre-Olympic preparation match against Guatemala in February 2008, scoring once in a 5–0 win. His only official appearance took place on 5 June 2011 in a friendly with Poland, and he netted the 1–1 equaliser in an eventual 2–1 loss.

== Career statistics ==
=== Club ===
Appearances and goals by club, season and competition
Club	Season	League			Cup		Continental		Other		Total	
Club	Season	Division	Apps	Goals	Apps	Goals	Apps	Goals	Apps	Goals	Apps	Goals
Rosario Central	2005–06	Argentine Primera División	29	11	0	0	0	0	0	0	29	11
Rosario Central	2006–07	Argentine Primera División	16	7	0	0	0	0	0	0	16	7
Rosario Central	Total		45	18	0	0	0	0	0	0	45	18
River Plate	2006–07	Argentine Primera División	8	3	0	0	0	0	0	0	8	3
River Plate	2007–08	Argentine Primera División	20	4	0	0	0	0	0	0	20	4
River Plate	Total		28	7	0	0	0	0	0	0	28	7
Villarreal	2007–08	La Liga	0	0	0	0	0	0	0	0	0	0
Villarreal	2008–09	La Liga	0	0	0	0	0	0	0	0	0	0
Villarreal	2009–10	La Liga	4	0	0	0	1 (Note: Appearances in UEFA Europa League)	1	0	0	5	1
Villarreal	2010–11	La Liga	30	5	4	2	13	4	0	0	47	11
Villarreal	2011–12	La Liga	31	9	1	0	5 (Note: Appearances in UEFA Champions League)	0	0	0	37	9
Villarreal	Total		65	14	5	2	19	5	0	0	89	21
Recreativo (loan)	2007–08	La Liga	14	4	0	0	0	0	0	0	14	4
Recreativo (loan)	2008–09	La Liga	29	3	0	0	0	0	0	0	29	3
Recreativo (loan)	Total		43	7	0	0	0	0	0	0	43	7
Villarreal B	2009–10	Segunda División	31	18	0	0	0	0	0	0	31	18
Dynamo Kyiv	2012–13	Ukrainian Premier League	11	1	0	0	4 (Note: Three appearances in UEFA Champions League, one appearance in UEFA Europa League)	0	0	0	15	1
Dynamo Kyiv	2013–14	Ukrainian Premier League	0	0	0	0	0	0	0	0	0	0
Dynamo Kyiv	Total		11	1	0	0	4	0	0	0	15	1
Évian (loan)	2013–14	Ligue 1	25	1	4	0	0	0	0	0	29	1
Tigres (loan)	2014–15	Liga MX	10	0	2	1	0	0	2 (Note: Appearances in Supercopa MX)	0	14	1
Rosario Central (loan)	2015	Argentine Primera División	30	21	5	3	0	0	0	0	35	24
Rosario Central (loan)	2016	Argentine Primera División	11	7	5	4	8 (Note: Appearances in Copa Libertadores)	8	0	0	24	19
Rosario Central (loan)	Total		41	28	10	7	8	8	0	0	59	43
Rosario Central	2016–17	Argentine Primera División	21	6	0	0	0	0	0	0	21	6
Rosario Central	2017–18	Argentine Primera División	17	3	4	0	2 (Note: Appearances in Copa Sudamericana)	0	0	0	23	3
Rosario Central	2018–19	Argentine Primera División	9	0	4	1	0	0	0	0	13	1
Rosario Central	2019–20	Argentine Primera División	7	4	0	0	0	0	1 (Note: Appearance in Copa de la Superliga)	1	8	5
Rosario Central	2021	Argentine Primera División	19	15	0	0	8	2	11 (Note: Appearances in Copa de la Liga Profesional)	3	38	20
Rosario Central	2022	Argentine Primera División	0	0	0	0	0	0	11	4	11	4
Rosario Central	Total		73	28	8	1	10	2	23	8	114	39
Athletico Paranaense (loan)	2019	Série A	23	4	8	2	8	6	3 (Note: Two appearances and one goal in Recopa Sudamericana, one appearance in J.League Cup / Copa Sudamericana Championship)	1	42	13
Deportivo Maldonado	2023	Uruguayan Primera División	2	0	0	0	0	0	0	0	2	0
Deportivo Maldonado	2024	Uruguayan Primera División	11	3	0	0	0	0	0	0	11	3
Deportivo Maldonado	Total		13	3	0	0	0	0	0	0	13	3
Rosario Central	2024	Argentine Primera División	17	1	1	0	2	0	0	0	20	1
Career total			425	130	38	13	51	21	28	9	542	173

=== International ===
Appearances and goals by national team and year
National team	Year	Apps	Goals
Argentina	2011	1	1
Total		1	1

Scores and results list Argentina's goal tally first, score column indicates score after each Ruben goal.

List of international goals scored by Marco Ruben
No.	Date	Venue	Opponent	Score	Result	Competition
1	5 June 2011	Polish Army Stadium, Warsaw, Poland	Poland	1–1	1–2	Friendly

== Honours ==
Rosario Central

- Copa Argentina: 2017–18
- Supercopa Internacional: 2026

Athletico Paranaense

- Copa do Brasil: 2019
- J.League Cup / Copa Sudamericana Championship: 2019
