= Renzo Alfani =

Argentine footballer

Personal information
- Full name: Renzo José Ignacio Alfani
- Date of birth: 18 February 1996 (age 30)
- Place of birth: Rosario, Argentina
- Height: 1.86 m (6 ft 1 in)
- Position: Centre-back

Team information
- Current team: Juan Pablo II College
- Number: 25

Youth career
- 2013–2016: Rosario Central

Senior career*
Years	Team	Apps	(Gls)
2016–2018	Rosario Central	4	(0)
2017–2018	→ Villa Dálmine (loan)	6	(0)
2019	Santos	22	(4)
2020	Deportivo Municipal	16	(2)
2021–	Carlos A. Mannucci	0	(0)
- * Club domestic league appearances and goals as of 19:18, 14 December 2020 (UTC)

Renzo José Ignacio Alfani (born 18 February 1996) is an Argentine professional footballer who plays as a centre-back for Juan Pablo II College.

== Career ==
After joining Rosario Central in 2013, Alfani began his senior career with the club in late-2016 when he was an unused substitute for league matches with Olimpo and Lanús; which preceded his professional debut on 18 December during a victory against Belgrano. He subsequently made three further appearances in all competitions during 2016–17. In November 2017, Alfani was loaned to Primera B Nacional team Villa Dálmine. In January 2019, Alfani was announced as a new signing for Santos in the Peruvian Segunda División. He scored his first senior goal on 26 May in a 2–0 win over Atlético Grau.

In 2020, Alfani moved up to Peru's Primera División with Deportivo Municipal; alongside Matías Mansilla, who had also been his teammate at Rosario and Santos. He scored goals against Carlos Stein and Alianza Lima whilst appearing sixteen times. In December 2020, Alfani agreed terms with fellow Peruvian top-flight outfit Carlos A. Mannucci ahead of the 2021 campaign.

== Career statistics ==
As of 14 December 2020.

Club statistics
Club	Season	League			Cup		League Cup		Continental		Other		Total	
Club	Season	Division	Apps	Goals	Apps	Goals	Apps	Goals	Apps	Goals	Apps	Goals	Apps	Goals
Rosario Central	2016–17	Primera División	3	0	1	0	—		—		0	0	4	0
Rosario Central	2017–18	Primera División	0	0	0	0	—		0	0	0	0	0	0
Rosario Central	2018–19	Primera División	1	0	0	0	—		0	0	0	0	1	0
Rosario Central	Total		4	0	1	0	—		0	0	0	0	5	0
Villa Dálmine (loan)	2017–18	Primera B Nacional	6	0	0	0	—		—		0	0	6	0
Santos	2019	Segunda División	22	4	0	0	—		—		0	0	22	4
Deportivo Municipal	2020	Primera División	16	2	0	0	—		—		0	0	16	2
Carlos A. Mannucci	2021	Primera División	0	0	0	0	—		—		0	0	0	0
Career total			48	6	1	0	—		0	0	0	0	49	6
