= Josué Ayala =

Argentine footballer

Personal information
- Full name: Josué Daniel Díaz Ayala
- Date of birth: 30 May 1988 (age 38)
- Place of birth: Buenos Aires, Argentina
- Height: 1.80 m (5 ft 11 in)
- Position: Goalkeeper

Team information
- Current team: Sarmiento
- Number: 38

Youth career
- 2006–2008: Boca Juniors

Senior career*
Years	Team	Apps	(Gls)
2008–2011	Boca Juniors	2	(0)
2010–2011	→ Independiente Rivadavia (loan)	37	(0)
2011–2015	Independiente Rivadavia	98	(0)
2015–2017	Atlético Tucumán	11	(0)
2017–2019	Temperley	25	(0)
2018–2019	→ Rosario Central (loan)	0	(0)
2019–2022	Rosario Central	2	(0)
2022–	Sarmiento	8	(0)
- * Club domestic league appearances and goals as of 12:56, 24 April 2022 (UTC)

Josué Daniel Díaz Ayala (born 30 May 1988 in Buenos Aires), is an Argentine football goalkeeper, who currently plays for Sarmiento.

== Career ==
Following the departure of goalkeeper Aldo Bobadilla in 2007, Ayala was promoted to the first team. Ayala was relegated to fourth goalkeeper behind Mauricio Caranta, Pablo Migliore and Javier García. On 17 March 2008, Ayala suffered an accident on the Dellepiane highway while traveling from the club to his house. He was also accompanied by Migliore, who had been with Ayala for a training session. This accident had no serious physical consequences for either goalie. In the second half of 2008, he began to be included in the first team squad due to Caranta's injuries. Ayala then ascended to become the third goalkeeper after Pablo Migliore departed to Racing Club.

Despite not playing, he won his first official title in 2008 when Boca beat Arsenal de Sarandí in the Recopa Sudamericana. He became the backup goaltender to Javier García midway through the 2008 Apertura and made his debut for Boca on 23 December 2008, in the second half of the final championship playoff game against Tigre, when García was forced to leave with an injury. It had been reported that after Boca had claimed the title Ayala was assaulted and stabbed in his home. The knife had only gone through muscle tissue, preventing a great tragedy.

In 2010, Ayala was loaned to second division side Independiente Rivadavia.

== Honours ==
Season	Team	Title
2008	Boca Juniors	Recopa Sudamericana
Apertura 2008	Boca Juniors	Argentine Primera División
