= Rodrigo González (footballer, born 2000) =

Argentine footballer

Personal information
- Full name: Rodrigo Iván González
- Date of birth: 14 April 2000 (age 26)
- Place of birth: Rosario, Argentina
- Position: Right-back

Team information
- Current team: Aldosivi
- Number: 4

Youth career
- Rosario Central

Senior career*
| Years | Team | Apps | (Gls) |
| 2019–2023 | Rosario Central | 1 | (0) |
| 2021 | → Belgrano (loan) | 6 | (0) |
| 2022 | → Guillermo Brown (loan) | 34 | (1) |
| 2023–2024 | Guillermo Brown | 32 | (0) |
| 2024– | Aldosivi | 81 | (0) |
- * Club domestic league appearances and goals as of 17:40, 6 November 2026 (UTC)

Rodrigo Iván González (born 14 April 2000) is an Argentine professional footballer who plays as a defender for Aldosivi.

== Club career ==
González is a product of the Rosario Central academy. He made his senior breakthrough in March 2019 under manager Paulo Ferrari, who selected him to start a Primera División fixture away to Godoy Cruz on 9 March. He featured for eighty-nine minutes, before receiving a red card following a second bookable offence. In February 2021, González was loaned out to Belgrano until the end of 2021. Ahead of the 2022 season, he was sent on loan at Guillermo Brown for one year.

== International career ==
González previously represented Argentina at U15 level.

== Career statistics ==
As of 9 March 2019.

Appearances and goals by club, season and competition
| Club | Season | League | | | Cup | | Continental | | Other | | Total | |
| Club | Season | Division | Apps | Goals | Apps | Goals | Apps | Goals | Apps | Goals | Apps | Goals |
|---|---|---|---|---|---|---|---|---|---|---|---|---|
| Rosario Central | 2018–19 | Primera División | 1 | 0 | 0 | 0 | — | | 0 | 0 | 1 | 0 |
| Career total | | | 1 | 0 | 0 | 0 | — | | 0 | 0 | 1 | 0 |
