= Ezequiel Rodríguez (footballer, born 1996) =

Argentine footballer

Personal information
- Date of birth: 25 March 1996 (age 30)
- Place of birth: Rosario, Argentina
- Position: Forward

Team information
- Current team: Huracán de Chabás

Youth career
- Academia Griffa
- San Telmo de Funes
- Rosario Central

Senior career*
Years	Team	Apps	(Gls)
2016–2017	Rosario Central	2	(0)
2017	→ Rubio Ñu (loan)	1	(0)
2018	Huracán de Los Quirquinchos		
2019	Alianza de Arteaga		
2020–	Huracán de Chabás		
- * Club domestic league appearances and goals

Ezequiel Rodríguez (born 25 March 1996) is an Argentine professional footballer who plays as a forward for Huracán de Chabás.

== Career ==
Rodríguez had youth spells with Academia Griffa, San Telmo de Funes and Rosario Central. He was moved into Rosario Central's first-team in May 2016, he subsequently made his senior debut during a 1–1 draw at home to Quilmes on 15 May. He made one further appearance in the following campaign of 2016–17 against Defensa y Justicia, prior to departing the club on loan in January 2017 to Paraguayan Primera División side Rubio Ñu. Rodríguez made his debut versus Sportivo Trinidense, which turned out to be his one and only appearance for Rubio Ñu. Rodríguez would exit soon after.

After leaving Rosario Central, Rodríguez joined Liga Interprovincial team Huracán de Los Quirquinchos in 2018. He departed but would remain in the regional league for the 2019 campaign, having agreed terms with Alianza de Arteaga. In January 2020, Rodríguez signed for Huracán de Chabás of Liga Casildense.

== Career statistics ==
As of 17 July 2020.

Club statistics
Club	Season	League			Cup		League Cup		Continental		Other		Total	
Club	Season	Division	Apps	Goals	Apps	Goals	Apps	Goals	Apps	Goals	Apps	Goals	Apps	Goals
Rosario Central	2016	Argentine Primera División	1	0	0	0	—		0	0	0	0	1	0
Rosario Central	2016–17	Argentine Primera División	1	0	0	0	—		—		0	0	1	0
Rosario Central	2017–18	Argentine Primera División	0	0	0	0	—		0	0	0	0	0	0
Rosario Central	Total		2	0	0	0	—		0	0	0	0	2	0
Rubio Ñu (loan)	2017	Paraguayan Primera División	1	0	—		—		0	0	0	0	1	0
Career total			3	0	0	0	—		0	0	0	0	3	0
