= Maximiliano González =

Argentine footballer

Personal information
- Full name: Maximiliano David González
- Date of birth: 12 March 1994 (age 32)
- Place of birth: San Lorenzo, Argentina
- Height: 1.79 m (5 ft 10 1/2 in)
- Position: Midfielder

Team information
- Current team: Deportivo Morón

Youth career
- Club Remedios
- Rosario Central

Senior career*
Years	Team	Apps	(Gls)
2014–2019	Rosario Central	24	(1)
2016–2017	→ Quilmes (loan)	18	(1)
2018–2019	→ Tigre (loan)	3	(0)
2019–2020	Alvarado	16	(1)
2020–2022	San Martín SJ	38	(1)
2022–2023	Atlanta	24	(0)
2023–2024	Independiente Rivadavia	30	(0)
2024–2025	Atlanta	19	(0)
2025–2026	Rangers	21	(0)
2026–	Deportivo Morón	9	(0)
- * Club domestic league appearances and goals as of 17:36, 27 April 2026 (UTC)

Maximiliano David González (born 12 March 1994) is an Argentine professional footballer who plays as a midfielder for Deportivo Morón.

== Career ==
González, signing from Club Remedios, first appeared in the Rosario Central first-team in July 2014, when he was an unused sub in the Copa Argentina versus Juventud Unida Universitario. González made his professional debut on 13 February 2015 during a victory at the Estadio Presidente Juan Domingo Perón against Racing Club, he was subbed on with ten minutes remaining for Jonás Aguirre. It was one of eight appearances for González in 2015. June 2016 saw González join Quilmes on loan. He went on to feature twenty times, he also scored in his penultimate appearance on 21 June 2017 versus Arsenal de Sarandí.

After returning to Rosario Central for the 2017–18 season, González netted his first goal for the club in February 2018 during a 5–0 home win over Olimpo. On 1 August 2018, González joined Tigre on loan. He made just three appearances for the club, partly due to a torn cruciate injury. González left Rosario permanently in 2019 to sign for Alvarado of Primera B Nacional. His debut came in a draw away to Barracas Central on 24 August, with his one and only goal for them arriving in November against Belgrano. August 2020 saw San Martín sign González.

Ahead of the 2022 season, González joined Atlanta.

In 2025, González moved to Chile and signed with Rangers de Talca.

== Career statistics ==
As of 27 October 2020.

Club statistics
Club	Season	League			Cup		League Cup		Continental		Other		Total	
Club	Season	Division	Apps	Goals	Apps	Goals	Apps	Goals	Apps	Goals	Apps	Goals	Apps	Goals
Rosario Central	2014	Primera División	0	0	0	0	—		0	0	0	0	0	0
Rosario Central	2015	Primera División	7	0	1	0	—		—		0	0	8	0
Rosario Central	2016	Primera División	2	0	0	0	—		1 (Note: Appearance(s) in the Copa Libertadores)	0	0	0	3	0
Rosario Central	2016–17	Primera División	0	0	0	0	—		—		0	0	0	0
Rosario Central	2017–18	Primera División	15	1	2	0	—		1 (Note: Appearance(s) in the Copa Sudamericana)	0	0	0	18	1
Rosario Central	2018–19	Primera División	0	0	0	0	—		—		0	0	0	0
Rosario Central	Total		24	1	3	0	—		2	0	0	0	29	1
Quilmes (loan)	2016–17	Primera División	18	1	2	0	—		—		0	0	20	1
Tigre (loan)	2018–19	Primera División	3	0	0	0	—		—		0	0	3	0
Alvarado	2019–20	Primera B Nacional	16	1	0	0	—		—		0	0	16	1
San Martín	2020–21	Primera B Nacional	0	0	0	0	—		—		0	0	0	0
Career total			61	3	5	0	—		2	0	0	0	68	3
