= Fernando Alarcón =

Argentine footballer

Personal information
- Full name: Fernando Rubén Alarcón
- Date of birth: 16 June 1994 (age 32)
- Place of birth: Guatimozín, Córdoba, Argentina
- Height: 1.85 m (6 ft 1 in)
- Position: Centre-back

Team information
- Current team: Instituto
- Number: 6

Senior career*
Years	Team	Apps	(Gls)
2015–2019	Rosario Central	0	(0)
2016	→ Deportivo Roca (loan)	0	(0)
2016–2017	→ Talleres (loan)	0	(0)
2017–2019	→ Villa Dálmine (loan)	29	(2)
2019–2020	Temperley	16	(1)
2020–2022	Tigre	30	(0)
2022–	Instituto	157	(5)
- * Club domestic league appearances and goals as of 18:02, 10 May 2026 (UTC)

Fernando Rubén Alarcón (born 16 June 1994) is an Argentine professional footballer who plays as a centre-back for Argentine Primera División side Instituto.

== Career ==
Alarcón moved into the Rosario Central first-team in May 2015, when he was an unused substitute for a Copa Argentina tie with Deportivo Riestra. Alarcón joined Deportivo Roca on loan on 8 July 2016, but returned to Argentine Primera División side Rosario Central later that month for personal reasons. He subsequently was loaned to fellow Primera División team Talleres in August. Despite remaining for the entire 2016–17 season, he failed to make an appearance for Talleres; appearing on the bench once. Back with Rosario Central in June 2017, he again left on loan in July to Villa Dálmine of Primera B Nacional.

He scored his first career goal versus Los Andes on 28 October 2017. Villa Dálmine extended his loan in June 2018.

== Career statistics ==
As of 29 June 2018.

Club statistics
Club	Season	League			Cup (Note: Includes the Copa Argentina)		League Cup		Continental (Note: Includes the Copa Libertadores and Copa Sudamericana)		Other		Total	
Club	Season	Division	Apps	Goals	Apps	Goals	Apps	Goals	Apps	Goals	Apps	Goals	Apps	Goals
Rosario Central	2015	Primera División	0	0	0	0	—		—		0	0	0	0
Rosario Central	2016	Primera División	0	0	0	0	—		0	0	0	0	0	0
Rosario Central	2016–17	Primera División	0	0	0	0	—		—		0	0	0	0
Rosario Central	2017–18	Primera División	0	0	0	0	—		0	0	0	0	0	0
Rosario Central	2018–19	Primera División	0	0	0	0	—		—		0	0	0	0
Rosario Central	Total		0	0	0	0	—		0	0	0	0	0	0
Deportivo Roca (loan)	2016–17	Torneo Federal A	0	0	0	0	—		—		0	0	0	0
Talleres (loan)	2016–17	Primera División	0	0	0	0	—		—		0	0	0	0
Villa Dálmine (loan)	2017–18	Primera B Nacional	8	1	0	0	—		—		0	0	8	1
Villa Dálmine (loan)	2018–19	Primera B Nacional	0	0	0	0	—		—		0	0	0	0
Villa Dálmine (loan)	Total		8	1	0	0	—		—		0	0	8	1
Career total			8	1	0	0	—		0	0	0	0	8	1
