= Juan Ojeda (Argentine footballer) =

Argentine footballer

Personal information
- Full name: Juan Marcelo Ojeda
- Date of birth: November 10, 1982 (age 43)
- Place of birth: Arroyo Seco, Argentina
- Height: 1.79 m (5 ft 10 in)
- Position: Goalkeeper

Youth career
- Rosario Central

Senior career*
Years	Team	Apps	(Gls)
2003–2006	Rosario Central	79	(0)
2007–2010	River Plate	30	(0)
2011	Deportivo Anzoátegui	2	(0)
2012–2013	Deportivo Cuenca	79	(0)
2014	Unión La Calera	17	(0)
2014–2015	Gimnasia de Jujuy	32	(0)
2016–2017	Boca Unidos	42	(0)
2017–2018	Central Córdoba	52	(0)
2019–2021	Villa Dálmine	37	(0)
2021–2022	Deportivo Madryn	47	(0)
- * Club domestic league appearances and goals

Juan Marcelo Ojeda (born 10 November 1982 in Arroyo Seco, Santa Fe) is an Argentine former football goalkeeper.

== Career ==
Ojeda made his debut for Rosario Central on May 28, 2004, in a 1–0 defeat against Colón de Santa Fe, he continued to play regularly for Central until his transfer to River during the January 2007 transfer window.

He was the first choice keeper at the beginning of the Apertura 2007 tournament, when incumbent Juan Pablo Carrizo was expected to depart for Lazio. However, Carrizo's transfer was delayed by a year, and he forced his way back into the squad, relegating Ojeda to the bench. In 2008, he was part of the River Plate squad that won the Clausura 2008 tournament, without making a single league appearance. Carrizo's transfer to Lazio was finally confirmed in June 2008. He was with them until 2010.

His last club was Deportivo Madryn in 2022.
