= Diego Zabala =

Uruguayan footballer (born 1991)

Personal information
- Full name: Diego Martín Zabala Morales
- Date of birth: September 19, 1991 (age 35)
- Place of birth: Montevideo, Uruguay
- Height: 1.72 m (5 ft 8 in)
- Position: Right winger

Team information
- Current team: Amazonas
- Number: 22

Youth career
- Racing Montevideo

Senior career*
Years	Team	Apps	(Gls)
2011–2017	Racing Montevideo	115	(13)
2016–2017	→ Vélez Sarsfield (loan)	33	(6)
2017–2019	Unión Santa Fe	50	(11)
2019–2021	Rosario Central	55	(4)
2022–2024	Nacional	104	(17)
2025–	Amazonas	21	(1)
- * Club domestic league appearances and goals as of 18 December 2025

Diego Martín Zabala Morales (born 19 September 1991) is a Uruguayan footballer who plays as an attacking midfielder for Amazonas.

== Career ==
Zabala started his career playing for Racing Club de Montevideo in 2011. He helped his team to a second-place finish in the 2014 Apertura tournament, although the team finished last in the immediately following 2015 Clausura.

The Uruguayan midfielder joined Vélez Sarsfield on loan for the 2016 Argentine Primera División. He debuted in a 0–1 defeat to Arsenal de Sarandí for the sixth fixture. Zabala scored his first two goals for the team in the tenth fixture, helping Vélez comeback in the game to defeat Rosario Central 3–2.

Zabala played for Uruguayan club Nacional from 2022 to 2024. In 2025, he joined Brazilian club Amazonas.

== Career statistics ==
As of match played on 25 February 2018

Appearances and goals by club, season and competition
Club	Season	League			Cup		League Cup		Other		Total	
Club	Season	Division	Apps	Goals	Apps	Goals	Apps	Goals	Apps	Goals	Apps	Goals
Racing	2010–11	Uruguayan Primera División	9	1	0	0	—				9	1
Racing	2011–12	Uruguayan Primera División	12	1	0	0	—				12	1
Racing	2012–13	Uruguayan Primera División	20	2	0	0	—				20	2
Racing	2013–14	Uruguayan Primera División	30	3	0	0	—				30	3
Racing	2014–15	Uruguayan Primera División	29	5	0	0	—				29	5
Racing	2015–16	Uruguayan Primera División	15	1	0	0	—				15	1
Racing	Total		115	13	0	0	0	0	0	0	115	13
Vélez Sarsfield (loan)	2016	Argentine Primera División	6	2	1	0	—				7	2
Vélez Sarsfield (loan)	2016–17	Argentine Primera División	27	4	0	0	—				27	4
Vélez Sarsfield (loan)	Total		33	6	1	0	0	0	0	0	34	6
Unión Santa Fe (loan)	2017–18	Argentine Primera División	17	4	1	0	—				18	4
Career totals			165	23	2	0	0	0	0	0	167	23

== Honours ==
Nacional

- Torneo Intermedio: 2022, 2024
- Torneo Clausura: 2022
- Primera División: 2022

Amazonas FC

- Campeonato Amazonense: 2025
