= Matías Mansilla (midfielder) =

Argentine footballer

Personal information
- Full name: Matías Alberto Mansilla
- Date of birth: 21 January 1996 (age 30)
- Place of birth: General Roca, Argentina
- Position: Central midfielder

Team information
- Current team: Deportivo Municipal
- Number: 26

Senior career*
| Years | Team | Apps | (Gls) |
| 2016–2018 | Rosario Central | 4 | (0) |
| 2017–2018 | → Quilmes (loan) | 13 | (0) |
| 2019–2021 | Santos | 37 | (4) |
| 2020 | → Deportivo Municipal (loan) | 25 | (0) |
| 2022–2023 | Sarmiento Resistencia | 62 | (4) |
| 2024– | Alvarado | 44 | (1) |
- * Club domestic league appearances and goals as of 16:49, 2 July 2025 (UTC)

Matías Alberto Mansilla (born 21 January 1996) is an Argentine professional footballer who plays as a central midfielder for Alvarado.

== Career ==
Mansilla made his professional football debut with Rosario Central in October 2016, featuring for the final minutes of a 1–1 draw against Huracán in the Argentine Primera División. He made four further appearances during the 2016–17 season. On 14 August 2017, Mansilla signed for Primera B Nacional's Quilmes on loan. In total, he featured on thirteen occasions for Quilmes as they finished twelfth. In January 2019, Mansilla was announced as a new player for Peruvian Segunda División side Santos. His first senior goal arrived in the succeeding June versus Juan Aurich.

2020 saw Mansilla join Peruvian Primera División team Deportivo Municipal; again teaming up with Renzo Alfani, who was also his teammate at Rosario and Santos.

== Career statistics ==
As of 18 December 2020.

Club statistics
| Club | Season | League | | | Cup | | League Cup | | Continental | | Other | | Total | |
| Club | Season | Division | Apps | Goals | Apps | Goals | Apps | Goals | Apps | Goals | Apps | Goals | Apps | Goals |
|---|---|---|---|---|---|---|---|---|---|---|---|---|---|---|
| Rosario Central | 2016–17 | Argentine Primera División | 4 | 0 | 1 | 0 | — | | — | | 0 | 0 | 5 | 0 |
| Rosario Central | 2017–18 | Argentine Primera División | 0 | 0 | 0 | 0 | — | | 0 | 0 | 0 | 0 | 0 | 0 |
| Rosario Central | 2018–19 | Argentine Primera División | 0 | 0 | 0 | 0 | — | | — | | 0 | 0 | 0 | 0 |
| Rosario Central | Total | | 4 | 0 | 1 | 0 | — | | 0 | 0 | 0 | 0 | 5 | 0 |
| Quilmes (loan) | 2017–18 | Primera B Nacional | 13 | 0 | 0 | 0 | — | | — | | 0 | 0 | 13 | 0 |
| Santos | 2019 | Segunda División | 22 | 3 | 0 | 0 | — | | — | | 0 | 0 | 22 | 3 |
| Deportivo Municipal | 2020 | Peruvian Primera División | 25 | 0 | 0 | 0 | — | | — | | 0 | 0 | 25 | 0 |
| Career total | | | 64 | 3 | 1 | 0 | — | | 0 | 0 | 0 | 0 | 65 | 3 |
