= Los Quirquinchos =

- Interactive map of Los Quirquinchos
- Coordinates: 33°22′00″S 61°43′00″W
- Country: Argentina
- Province: Santa Fe Province
- Department: Caseros Department
- Founded: 1902

Government
  - Type: Communal President
  - President: Matteucci Damián Justicialist Party
- Elevation: 95 m (312 ft)

Population (2001)
  - Total: 2,732
  - Density: 216/km^{2} (560/sq mi)
- Time zone: UTC−3 (ART)
- Postal code: S2637
- Area code: +54 3465

Los Quirquinchos is a town (comuna) in Santa Fe Province, in Caseros Departamento 140 km (87 mi) from Rosario, 256 km (159 mi) from the provincial capital, by provincial route RP 93. It has a population of 2,900 inhabitants as per the 2001 census [INDEC].

== History ==
Domingo Funes sold to Juan Gödeken a fraction of his land, a place without any roads, population or housing, making historians think that Gödeken was responsible for the first settlement and the farmers that came next cleaned up and cultivated the fields, building the majority of the rural roads. The town's name could have been temporary, looking at the local geography which features many chañars, a tree common to the area that gave the name to the nearby town of Chañar Ladeado (literally sideways chañar). The local township (comuna) was officially founded on October 11, 1906.

== Sports ==
The town has a local football club named Huracán Football Club, founded April 11, 1929. It plays in the local Lorenzo Tozini stadium, named after a prominent member of the club.

The town's principal annual event is Expo Globo, a rural industry and commerce show declared to be of social interest by the Federal Senate.
