= Julio Retamal Favereau =

Chilean academic (1933–2025)

Julio Gastón Retamal Favereau (November 14, 1933 – June 16, 2025) was a Chilean historian, genealogist and philosopher.

== Life and career ==
Retamal was born on November 14, 1933, in Constitución. In 1966, he obtained a degree in philosophy with a major in history at the University of Chile. While he was a student, he joined the Rehearsal Theater of the Catholic University (TEUC). In 1972, he obtained a doctorate in philosophy from the University of Oxford.

In 1966, he was a visiting professor at the Universidad del Valle, Cali, and in 1977 at the Faculty of Letters in Paris. Between August 1973 and August 1976, he was director of the Institute of History of the Catholic University of Chile.

Between 1976 and 1980, he was cultural attaché at the Chilean embassy in France. In 1983, he was appointed academic vice-rector of the Metropolitan University of Education Sciences, a position he held until 1985.

In 1992, he was named a full member of the Chilean Academy of History. In 2003, he was appointed professor emeritus at the Pontificia Universidad Católica de Chile. He served until January 2017 as a professor of Modern History and Theory of History at the Adolfo Ibáñez and Gabriela Mistral universities.

Retamal Favereau died on June 16, 2025, at the age of 91.
