= Oscar Retamal =

Argentine professional footballer

Personal information
- Full name: Oscar Jorge Luis Retamal Enríquez
- Date of birth: 23 March 1998 (age 28)
- Place of birth: Neuquén, Argentina
- Position: Forward

Team information
- Current team: Club Sapere

Youth career
- River Plate
- Newell's Old Boys
- Rosario Central

Senior career*
Years	Team	Apps	(Gls)
2019	Rosario Central	0	(0)
2019–	Club Sapere		
- * Club domestic league appearances and goals

Oscar Jorge Luis Retamal Enríquez (born 23 March 1998) is an Argentine professional footballer who plays as a forward for Club Sapere.

== Career ==
Retamal came through the ranks at Primera División clubs River Plate, Newell's Old Boys and Rosario Central. Diego Cocca promoted him into the latter's first-team in April 2019 ahead of a Copa de la Superliga first round, second leg tie against Aldosivi; who held a two-goal lead. Retamal came off the bench with ten minutes remaining in place of Maximiliano Lovera, as the club went on to win the match but were eliminated on aggregate. He was released in the succeeding June. Retamal subsequently joined Liga Neuquén outfit Club Sapere, though the forward expressed a wish to play abroad in 2020. He scored on debut for Sapere.

== Career statistics ==
As of 27 September 2019.

Appearances and goals by club, season and competition
Club	Season	League			Cup		League Cup		Continental		Other		Total	
Club	Season	Division	Apps	Goals	Apps	Goals	Apps	Goals	Apps	Goals	Apps	Goals	Apps	Goals
Rosario Central	2018–19	Primera División	0	0	0	0	1	0	0	0	0	0	1	0
Career total			0	0	0	0	1	0	0	0	0	0	1	0
