= Morteros =

- City
- Location of Morteros in Argentina
- Coordinates: 30°42′S 62°0′W
- Country: Argentina
- Province: Córdoba
- Department: San Justo

Government
  - Intendant: Sebastián Demarchi

Population (2010)
  - Total: 16,890
- Demonym: mortero/a
- Time zone: UTC−3 (ART)
- CPA base: X2421
- Dialing code: +54 03562

Morteros is a city and municipality in the San Justo Department in the north east of the Córdoba Province, Argentina.

The city of Morteros is one of the most important in the San Justo Department, it is near the intersection of two major highways RP 1 and RP 17 and near the ferrocarril Central Argentino.

Morteros is around 210 kilometres (130 mi) from the provincial capital Córdoba (280 by road) and 155 kilometres (96 mi) from Santa Fe.

== Geography ==
Morteros is around 17 kilometres (11 mi) from the eastern shore of Mar Chiquita.

The micro region around Morteros is an ecotone between the Humid Pampa semi arid Gran Chaco region. The temperature varies between 12 and 30 °C (54 and 86 °F) with an annual average of 23 °C (73 °F). The first frost can be expected on March 21 and the last on September 5. The average precipitation is 700 millimetres (28 in) per year.

Local flora include the chañar, tala, Quebracho, caranday and the yatay.

== History ==
Before the arrival of the conquistadores in the 16th Century the area was populated by ethnic Sanavirónes and Mocovíes.

In the 18th Century the Spanish established a fortress called Los Morteros on a rocky outcrop, the principal function of the fortress was to defend the local territory. It lay on an alternative route to the mining region of Potosí in Peru, it was used as a market for contraband such as slaves to work in the mines and silver.

Fortress Los Morteros and the local area were recaptured by the indigenous population after the May Revolution, although the Sanavirónes had been virtually extinguished, Mocovíes and Abipones moved into the area. The European Argentines launched a counter-offensive and reclaimed the territory in the middle of the century. The indigenous population suffered a great deal from the ethnic cleansing campaigns of the mid 19th century.

In 1891 the first railway arrived in Morteros, the railway brought a large number of European immigrants from the Piamonte, Friuli and Toscana in Italy. In 1965 Morteros acquired its status as a city.

== Economy ==
The economy of the area is dominated by agriculture, especially the production of maize and dairy products.

In 1952 the town started the production of Aero Boero which were mainly used for crop spraying and as training aircraft. Other industrial production included the production of agricultural machinery and industrial refrigerators.

In the 1990s the area saw a massive increase in the amount of soya, alfalfa and sorghum

There is little tourism in the region aside from the visitors to the Mar Chiquita Lake (Laguna Mar Chiquita o Laguna Ansenuza).

== Amenities ==
Morteros is home to a regional museum and the Instituto Universitario Aeronáutico (AeronauticalUniversity Institute). Local societies include the gaucho Fortin Society, the Rural Society of Morteros and the sports clubs 9 de Julio de Morteros and Tiro Federal de Morteros. There is a cinema with 3D capability, a big casino and several educational establishments, among which is the college / institute Cristo Rey.
