= Arroyo Seco, Santa Fe =

Arroyo Seco
- City
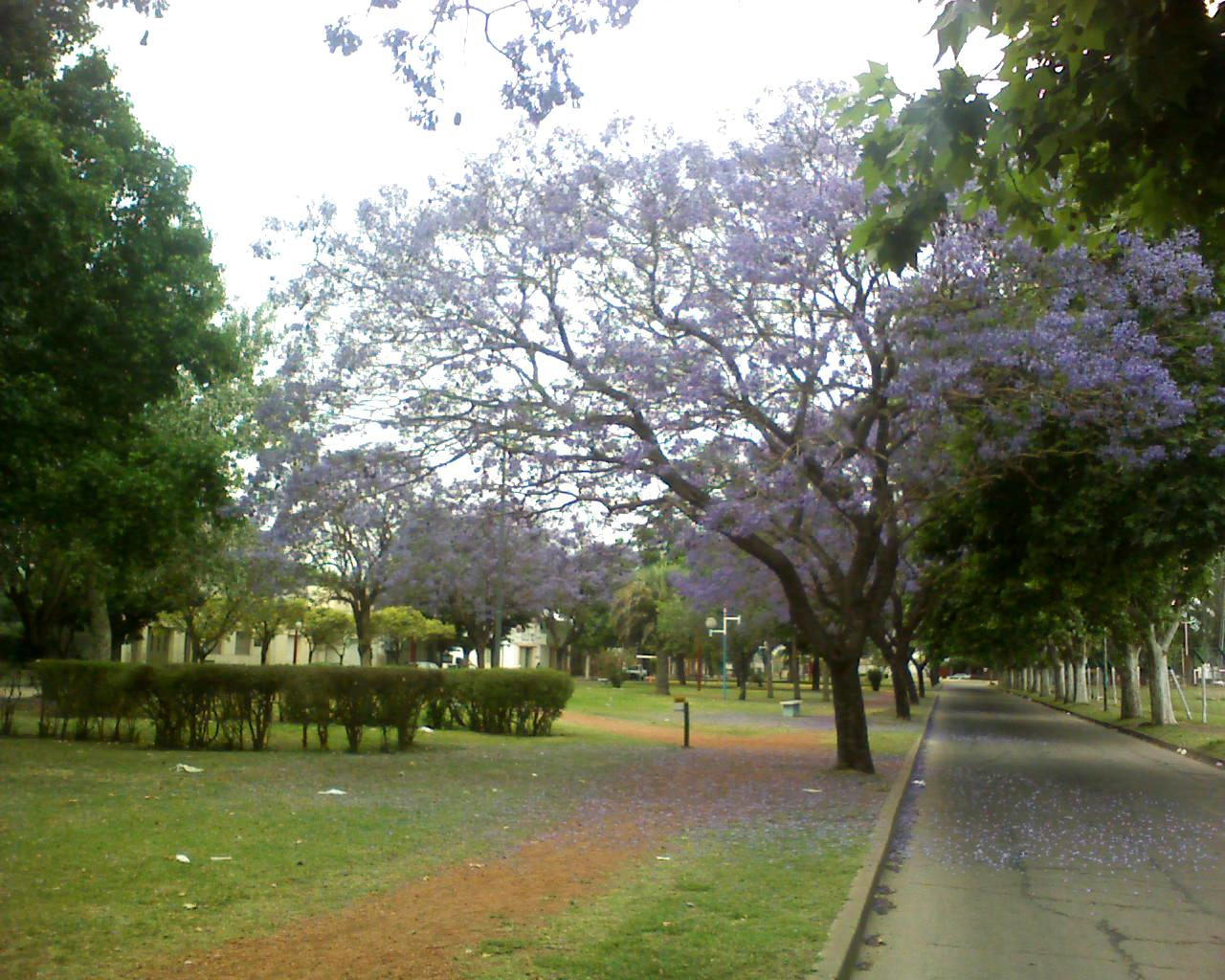

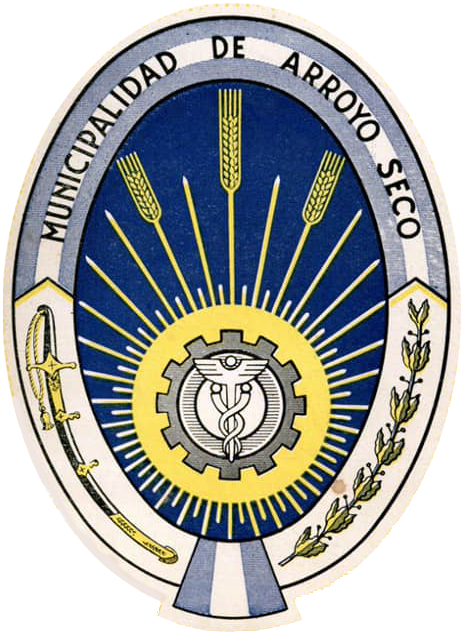
- Coat of arms

- Location of Arroyo Seco in Argentina
- Coordinates: 33°10′S 60°30′W
- Country: Argentina
- Province: Santa Fe
- Department: Rosario

Government
  - Intendant: Daniel Tonelli (Unión Civica Radical)

Area
  - Total: 141 km^{2} (54 sq mi)

Population (Censo 2022)
  - Total: 24,513
  - Density: 174/km^{2} (450/sq mi)
- Time zone: UTC−3 (ART)
- CPA base: S2128
- Dialing code: +54 3402

Arroyo Seco is a city in the province of Santa Fe, Argentina. It has about 20,000 inhabitants according to the 2010 census [INDEC]. Its name (literally "dry stream") is the same as a neighbouring creek. The city is located on the western shore of the Paraná River and can be reached also by National Route 9 (Argentina), Provincial Route 21, and the Nuevo Central Argentino railway line.

The town was founded in 1889 by Liberato Aguirre, who donated part of his lands to the provincial government in order to allow the train to pass through (it was a part of the Buenos Aires–Rosario line, the latter being only 30 km (19 mi) away). The original name, "Pueblo Aguirre", was soon replaced by "Pueblo Arroyo Seco".

Arroyo Seco became a city on 12 April 1962.
