= 2022 AFA Liga Profesional de Fútbol =

Liga Profesional de Fútbol
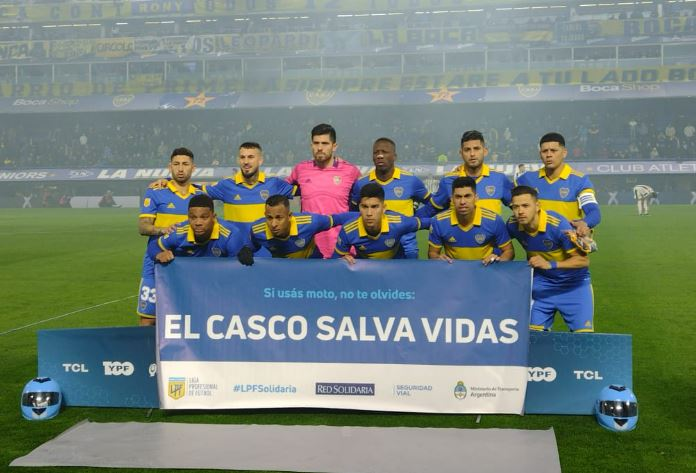
- Boca Juniors, champions
- Season: 2022
- Dates: 3 June – 25 October 2022
- Champions: Boca Juniors (35th title)
- Relegated: Aldosivi; Patronato
- Copa Libertadores: Argentinos Juniors; Boca Juniors; Huracán; Racing; River Plate; Patronato (via Copa Argentina)
- Copa Sudamericana: Defensa y Justicia; Estudiantes (LP); Gimnasia y Esgrima (LP); Newell's Old Boys; San Lorenzo; Tigre
- Matches: 378
- Goals: 826 (2.19 per match)
- Top goalscorer: Mateo Retegui (19 goals)
- Biggest home win: Racing 5–0 Aldosivi (26 June 2022); River Plate 5–0 Estudiantes (LP) (5 October 2022)
- Biggest away win: Unión 1–5 River Plate (19 June 2022); Colón 0–4 Argentinos Juniors (26 September 2022); Lanús 0–4 Argentinos Juniors (6 October 2022)
- Highest scoring: Boca Juniors 5–3 Tigre (15 June 2022)
- Longest winning run: Atlético Tucumán; 6 games
- Longest unbeaten run: Boca Juniors; 13 games
- Longest winless run: Vélez Sarsfield; 15 games
- Longest losing run: Aldosivi; 6 games

The 2022 Liga Profesional de Fútbol (officially the Torneo Binance 2022 for sponsorship reasons) was the 132nd season of top-flight professional football in Argentina. The league season began on 3 June and ended on 25 October 2022.

Twenty-eight teams competed in the league: the 26 teams that took part in the previous Primera División season as well as two promoted teams from the 2021 Primera Nacional (Tigre and Barracas Central). River Plate were the defending champions.

On 23 October 2022, Boca Juniors won their 35th national league championship in the last round after they and Independiente drew 2–2 and, simultaneously, River Plate defeated Racing 1–2.

== Competition format ==
The competition was run under a single round-robin, contested by 28 teams (26 from the previous edition plus 2 promoted from Primera Nacional). The champions qualified for the 2023 Copa Libertadores as Argentina 1. The qualification for international tournaments was determined by an aggregate table of the 2022 Primera División and 2022 Copa de la Liga Profesional first stage tournaments.

== Club information ==
=== Stadia and locations ===
Locations of the 2022 Argentine Primera División teams outside Greater Buenos Aires.
Locations of the 2022 Argentine Primera División teams within Greater Buenos Aires.

Club	City	Stadium	Capacity
Aldosivi	Mar del Plata	José María Minella	35,354
Argentinos Juniors	Buenos Aires	Diego Armando Maradona	25,000
Arsenal	Sarandí	Julio Humberto Grondona	16,300
Atlético Tucumán	Tucumán	Monumental José Fierro	32,700
Banfield	Banfield	Florencio Sola	34,901
Barracas Central	Buenos Aires	Claudio Chiqui Tapia	4,400
Boca Juniors	Buenos Aires	Alberto J. Armando	54,000
Central Córdoba (SdE)	Santiago del Estero	Único Madre de Ciudades	30,000
Central Córdoba (SdE)	Santiago del Estero	Alfredo Terrera	16,000
Colón	Santa Fe	Brigadier General Estanislao López	40,000
Defensa y Justicia	Florencio Varela	Norberto "Tito" Tomaghello	12,000
Estudiantes (LP)	La Plata	Jorge Luis Hirschi	30,000
Gimnasia y Esgrima (LP)	La Plata	Juan Carmelo Zerillo	24,544
Godoy Cruz	Godoy Cruz	Feliciano Gambarte	14,000
Godoy Cruz	Godoy Cruz	Malvinas Argentinas	42,000
Huracán	Buenos Aires	Tomás Adolfo Ducó	48,314
Independiente	Avellaneda	Libertadores de América	52,853
Lanús	Lanús	Ciudad de Lanús - Néstor Díaz Pérez	46,619
Newell's Old Boys	Rosario	Marcelo Bielsa	38,095
Patronato	Paraná	Presbítero Bartolomé Grella	22,000
Platense	Florida Este	Ciudad de Vicente López	28,530
Racing	Avellaneda	Presidente Perón	55,389
River Plate	Buenos Aires	Monumental Antonio Vespucio Liberti	70,074
Rosario Central	Rosario	Gigante de Arroyito	41,654
San Lorenzo	Buenos Aires	Pedro Bidegain	39,494
Sarmiento (J)	Junín	Eva Perón	19,000
Talleres (C)	Córdoba	Mario Alberto Kempes	57,000
Tigre	Victoria	José Dellagiovanna	26,282
Unión	Santa Fe	15 de Abril	22,852
Vélez Sarsfield	Buenos Aires	José Amalfitani	45,540

=== Personnel ===
Club	Manager	Kit manufacturer	Sponsor
Aldosivi	(Argentina) Diego Villar (caretaker)	Kappa	UTHGRA Sasso Hotel
Argentinos Juniors	(Argentina) Gabriel Milito	Umbro	Bumeran
Arsenal	(Argentina) Leonardo Madelón	Sport Lyon	Secco
Atlético Tucumán	(Argentina) Lucas Pusineri	Umbro	RapiCuota$
Banfield	(Argentina) Javier Sanguinetti	Athix	Sur Finanzas
Barracas Central	(Argentina) Rodolfo de Paoli and (Argentina) Alejandro Milano	Il Ossso Sports	La Nueva Seguros
Boca Juniors	(Argentina) Hugo Ibarra (caretaker)	Adidas	
Central Córdoba (SdE)	(Argentina) Abel Balbo	Adhoc	Banco Santiago del Estero
Colón	(Uruguay) Marcelo Saralegui (caretaker)	Kelme	Cablevideo Digital
Defensa y Justicia	(Argentina) Julio Vaccari	Sport Lyon	RapiCuota$
Estudiantes (LP)	(Argentina) Pablo Quatrocchi (caretaker)	RUGE	B•play
Gimnasia y Esgrima (LP)	(Argentina) Néstor Gorosito	Hummel	RapiCuota$
Godoy Cruz	(Argentina) Favio Orsi and (Argentina) Sergio Gómez	Fiume Sport	CATA Internacional
Huracán	(Argentina) Diego Dabove	H1908	DECRYPTO
Independiente	(Argentina) Julio César Falcioni	Puma	
Lanús	(Argentina) Frank Darío Kudelka	Erreà	Mapei
Newell's Old Boys	(Argentina) Adrián Coria (caretaker)	Givova	City Center ONLINE
Patronato	(Argentina) Facundo Sava	Axfiu	Planes ESCO
Platense	(Argentina) Omar De Felippe	Hummel	Boston Seguros
Racing	(Argentina) Fernando Gago	Kappa	Aeroset
River Plate	(Argentina) Marcelo Gallardo	Adidas	Codere
Rosario Central	(Argentina) Carlos Tevez	Umbro	City Center ONLINE
San Lorenzo	(Argentina) Rubén Darío Insúa	Nike	
Sarmiento (J)	(Argentina) Israel Damonte	Coach	Naldo
Talleres (C)	(Argentina) Javier Gandolfi (caretaker)	Givova	ICBC Argentina
Tigre	(Argentina) Diego Martínez	Kappa	Banco Macro
Unión	(Uruguay) Gustavo Munúa	Kappa	OSPAT
Vélez Sarsfield	(Uruguay) Alexander Medina	Kappa	B•play

=== Managerial changes ===
Team	Outgoing manager	Manner of departure	Date of vacancy	Position in table	Replaced by	Date of appointment
Sarmiento (J)	(Argentina) Martín Funes	End of caretaker spell	11 December 2021	Pre-season	(Argentina) Israel Damonte	15 December 2021
Atlético Tucumán	(Argentina) Martín Anastacio	End of caretaker spell	11 December 2021	Pre-season	(Argentina) Juan Manuel Azconzábal	11 December 2021
San Lorenzo	(Argentina) Daniel Di Leo and (Argentina) Diego Monarriz	End of caretaker spell	12 December 2021	Pre-season	(Argentina) Pedro Troglio	29 December 2021
Newell's Old Boys	(Argentina) Adrián Taffarel	End of caretaker spell	12 December 2021	Pre-season	(Argentina) Javier Sanguinetti	13 December 2021
Lanús	(Argentina) Luis Zubeldía	End of contract	12 December 2021	Pre-season	(Argentina) Jorge Almirón	25 December 2021
Arsenal	(Argentina) Darío Espínola	End of caretaker spell	13 December 2021	Pre-season	(Argentina) Leonardo Madelón	23 December 2021
Colón	(Argentina) Eduardo Domínguez	Resigned	20 December 2021	Pre-season	(Argentina) Julio César Falcioni	3 January 2022
Talleres (C)	(Uruguay) Alexander Medina	End of contract	23 December 2021	Pre-season	(Argentina) Ángel Guillermo Hoyos	14 January 2022
Independiente	(Argentina) Julio César Falcioni	End of contract	28 December 2021	Pre-season	(Argentina) Eduardo Domínguez	3 January 2022
Copa de la Liga Profesional changes
Barracas Central	(Argentina) Rodolfo de Paoli	Resigned	21 February 2022	14th Zone B	(Argentina) Alfredo Berti ^{1}	28 February 2022
Patronato	(Argentina) Iván Delfino	Mutual agreement	2 March 2022	14th Zone A	(Argentina) Facundo Sava ^{2}	6 March 2022
Talleres (C)	(Argentina) Ángel Guillermo Hoyos	Sacked	13 March 2022	14th Zone A	(Portugal) Pedro Caixinha ^{3}	28 March 2022
Rosario Central	(Argentina) Kily González	Sacked	20 March 2022	10th Zone B	(Argentina) Leandro Somoza	27 March 2022
Vélez Sarsfield	(Argentina) Mauricio Pellegrino	Resigned	23 March 2022	14th Zone B	(Argentina) Julio Vaccari ^{4}	24 March 2022
Platense	(Argentina) Claudio Spontón	Resigned	3 April 2022	11th Zone A	(Argentina) Omar De Felippe	5 April 2022
Godoy Cruz	(Argentina) Diego Flores	Mutual agreement	9 April 2022	10th Zone B	(Argentina) Favio Orsi and (Argentina) Sergio Gómez	10 April 2022
Atlético Tucumán	(Argentina) Juan Manuel Azconzábal	Resigned	10 April 2022	14th Zone A	(Argentina) Lucas Pusineri	11 April 2022
San Lorenzo	(Argentina) Pedro Troglio	Resigned	13 April 2022	10th Zone A	(Argentina) Fernando Berón ^{5}	14 April 2022
Inter-tournament changes
Banfield	(Argentina) Diego Dabove	Mutual agreement	10 May 2022	N/A	(Argentina) Claudio Vivas	10 May 2022
Huracán	(Argentina) Frank Darío Kudelka	Resigned	16 May 2022	N/A	(Argentina) Diego Dabove ^{6}	26 May 2022
San Lorenzo	(Argentina) Fernando Berón	End of caretaker spell	18 May 2022	N/A	(Argentina) Rubén Darío Insúa	19 May 2022
Vélez Sarsfield	(Argentina) Julio Vaccari	End of caretaker spell	24 May 2022	N/A	(Uruguay) Alexander Medina	30 May 2022
Aldosivi	(Argentina) Martín Palermo	Resigned	30 May 2022	N/A	(Argentina) Leandro Somoza ^{7}	27 June 2022
Liga Profesional changes
Rosario Central	(Argentina) Leandro Somoza	Resigned	14 June 2022	27th	(Argentina) Carlos Tevez ^{8}	21 June 2022
Central Córdoba (SdE)	(Argentina) Sergio Rondina	Resigned	4 July 2022	15th	(Argentina) Abel Balbo ^{9}	21 July 2022
Boca Juniors	(Argentina) Sebastián Battaglia	Sacked	6 July 2022	11th	(Argentina) Hugo Ibarra ^{10}	11 July 2022
Colón	(Argentina) Julio César Falcioni	Mutual agreement	7 July 2022	22nd	(Argentina) Sergio Rondina ^{11}	12 July 2022
Lanús	(Argentina) Jorge Almirón	Sacked	7 July 2022	25th	(Argentina) Frank Darío Kudelka ^{12}	25 July 2022
Independiente	(Argentina) Eduardo Domínguez	Resigned	12 July 2022	22nd	(Argentina) Julio César Falcioni ^{13}	2 August 2022
Barracas Central	(Argentina) Alfredo Berti	Resigned	20 July 2022	21st	(Argentina) Rodolfo de Paoli and (Argentina) Alejandro Milano ^{14}	15 August 2022
Colón	(Argentina) Sergio Rondina	Mutual agreement	17 August 2022	22nd	(Argentina) Adrián Marini ^{15}	18 August 2022
Newell's Old Boys	(Argentina) Javier Sanguinetti	Resigned	29 August 2022	14th	(Argentina) Adrián Coria ^{16}	5 September 2022
Talleres (C)	(Portugal) Pedro Caixinha	Mutual agreement	5 September 2022	24th	(Argentina) Javier Gandolfi ^{17}	6 September 2022
Defensa y Justicia	(Argentina) Sebastián Beccacece	Resigned	11 September 2022	22nd	(Argentina) Julio Vaccari ^{18}	20 September 2022
Aldosivi	(Argentina) Leandro Somoza	Sacked	22 September 2022	28th	(Argentina) Diego Villar ^{19}	23 September 2022
Colón	(Argentina) Adrián Marini	End of caretaker spell	28 September 2022	25th	(Uruguay) Marcelo Saralegui ^{20}	28 September 2022
Estudiantes (LP)	(Argentina) Ricardo Zielinski	Resigned	30 September 2022	19th	(Argentina) Pablo Quatrocchi ^{19}	1 October 2022
Banfield	(Argentina) Claudio Vivas	Mutual agreement	5 October 2022	21st	(Argentina) Javier Sanguinetti ^{21}	10 October 2022

Interim managers

1. (Argentina) Sergio Ramos and (Argentina) Salvador Daniele were interim managers in the 2022 Copa de la Liga Profesional Group stage 4th round.
2. (Argentina) Gabriel Graciani was interim manager in the 2022 Copa de la Liga Profesional Group stage 5th round.
3. Javier Gandolfi was interim manager in the 2021–22 Copa Argentina round of 64 and the 2022 Copa de la Liga Profesional Group stage 7th round.
4. Long-term interim manager.
5. Interim manager until the end of the Copa de la Liga Profesional.
6. Claudio Cabrera was interim manager in the 2021–22 Copa Argentina round of 64.
7. (Argentina) Favio Fernández and (Argentina) Diego Villar were interim managers in the 1st and 2nd–5th rounds, respectively.
8. (Argentina) Germán Rivarola was interim manager in the 3rd–4th rounds.
9. (Argentina) Adrián Adrover was interim manager in the 7th–9th rounds.
10. Interim manager until the 2022 Trofeo de Campeones de la Liga Profesional final. Ibarra was promoted to manager after the Trofeo de Campeones de la Liga Profesional.
11. (Argentina) Adrián Marini was interim manager in the 7th round.
12. Rodrigo Acosta was interim manager in the 7th–10th rounds and the 2021–22 Copa Argentina round of 32.
13. (Argentina) Claudio Graf and (Argentina) Juan José Serrizuela were interim managers in the 8th–10th rounds and 11th round, respectively.
14. (Argentina) Sergio Ramos was interim manager in the 10th–13th rounds.
15. (Argentina) Adrián Marini was interim manager in the 15th–21nd rounds.
16. Gustavo Tognarelli was interim manager in the 17th round. Coria was interim manager starting from the 2021–22 Copa Argentina round of 16 until the end of the Liga Profesional.
17. Interim manager until the 2021–22 Copa Argentina final. Gandolfi was promoted to manager after the Copa Argentina.
18. (Argentina) Nicolás Diez was interim manager in the 19th–20th rounds.
19. Interim manager until the end of the Liga Profesional.
20. Interim manager until the end of the Liga Profesional. Saralegui was promoted to manager after the Liga Profesional.
21. (Argentina) Cristian Vella and (Argentina) Leonardo Testone were interim managers in the 24th round.

=== Foreign players ===
Club	Player 1	Player 2	Player 3	Player 4	Player 5	Player 6
Aldosivi	(Uruguay) Martín Cauteruccio	(Colombia) Juan Manuel Cuesta	(Colombia) Juan Pablo Gallego	(Paraguay) Mario López Quintana	(Paraguay) Fernando Román	(Uruguay) Santiago Silva
Argentinos Juniors	(Colombia) Andrés Alarcón	(Paraguay) Gabriel Ávalos	(Uruguay) Javier Cabrera	(Paraguay) Juan José Cardozo	(Colombia) Andrés Felipe Roa	(Uruguay) Alan Rodríguez
Arsenal	(Uruguay) William Machado					
Atlético Tucumán	(Colombia) Andrés Balanta	(Paraguay) Enrique Borja	(Uruguay) Jonathan Sandoval			
Banfield	(Uruguay) José Ignacio Álvarez	(Colombia) Mauricio Cuero	(Cameroon) Dany Edjo'o	(Paraguay) Erik López	(Venezuela) Luis Mago	
Barracas Central	(Paraguay) Cristian Colmán	(Colombia) Thomás Gutiérrez	(Colombia) Sebastián Rincón			
Boca Juniors	(Peru) Luis Advíncula	(Paraguay) Óscar Romero	(Colombia) Sebastián Villa	(Peru) Carlos Zambrano		
Central Córdoba (SdE)	(Uruguay) Paulo Lima	(Uruguay) Renzo López	(Paraguay) Iván Ramírez	(Chile) Cristopher Toselli		
Colón	(Paraguay) Mario Otazú	(Colombia) Baldomero Perlaza	(Uruguay) Andrew Teuten			
Defensa y Justicia	(Uruguay) Fabricio Domínguez	(Uruguay) Leandro Otormín				
Estudiantes (LP)	(Uruguay) Manuel Castro	(Uruguay) Mauro Méndez	(Paraguay) Jorge Morel			
Gimnasia y Esgrima (LP)	(Uruguay) Brahian Alemán	(Uruguay) Guillermo Fratta	(Paraguay) Ramón Sosa			
Godoy Cruz	(Paraguay) José Canale	(Paraguay) Juan Espínola	(Uruguay) Enzo Larrosa	(Uruguay) Santiago Paiva	(Uruguay) Juan Pintado	(Uruguay) Salomón Rodríguez
Huracán	(Uruguay) Maicol Cabrera	(Uruguay) Matías Cóccaro	(Chile) Guillermo Soto			
Independiente	(Uruguay) Renzo Bacchia	(Ecuador) Juan Cazares	(Uruguay) Edgar Elizalde	(Uruguay) Diego Segovia	(Uruguay) Sebastián Sosa	
Lanús	(Colombia) Felipe Aguilar	(Uruguay) Luciano Boggio	(Paraguay) Iván Cazal	(Uruguay) Guillermo de Amores	(Colombia) Raúl Loaiza	
Newell's Old Boys	(Colombia) Fabián Ángel	(Colombia) Willer Ditta	(Uruguay) Armando Méndez	(Ecuador) Djorkaeff Reasco	(Paraguay) Víctor Velázquez	
Patronato	(Colombia) Emerson Batalla					
Platense	(Paraguay) Jorge Benítez	(Uruguay) Federico Gino	(Uruguay) Sebastián Guerrero	(Uruguay) Haibrany Ruiz Díaz		
Racing	(Colombia) Johan Carbonero	(Colombia) Edwin Cardona	(Chile) Eugenio Mena	(Uruguay) Fernando Prado	(Paraguay) Matías Rojas	
River Plate	(Colombia) Miguel Borja	(Chile) Paulo Díaz	(Colombia) Flabián Londoño	(Colombia) Juan Fernando Quintero	(Paraguay) Robert Rojas	
Rosario Central	(Uruguay) Jhonatan Candia	(Venezuela) Michael Covea	(Colombia) José David Leudo	(Paraguay) Gustavo Ramírez		
San Lorenzo	(Paraguay) Adam Bareiro	(Paraguay) Iván Leguizamón	(Colombia) Cristian Zapata			
Sarmiento (J)	(Uruguay) Federico Andueza	(Colombia) Harrinson Mancilla	(Paraguay) Fernando Martínez	(Uruguay) Jean Rosso		
Talleres (C)	(Ecuador) Alan Franco	(Uruguay) Christian Oliva	(Paraguay) Kevin Pereira	(Colombia) Rafa Pérez	(Uruguay) Michael Santos	(Colombia) Diego Valoyes
Tigre	(Paraguay) Blas Armoa					
Unión	(Uruguay) Jonathan Álvez	(Colombia) Bryan Castrillón	(Paraguay) Junior Marabel	(Uruguay) Santiago Mele	(Uruguay) Diego Polenta	
Vélez Sarsfield	(Uruguay) Leonardo Burián	(Uruguay) Matías de los Santos	(Paraguay) José Florentín	(Uruguay) Diego Godín		

==== Players holding Argentinian dual nationality ====
They do not take up a foreign slot.

- (Italy) Ezequiel Schelotto (Aldosivi)
- (Mexico) Shayr Mohamed (Arsenal)
- (Bolivia) Carlos Lampe (Atlético Tucumán)
- (Switzerland) Dylan Gissi (Banfield)
- (Armenia) Norberto Briasco (Boca Juniors)
- (Colombia) Frank Fabra (Boca Juniors)
- (Mexico) Luciano Bocco (Central Córdoba (SdE))
- (Italy) Matteo Trombini (Estudiantes (LP))
- (United States) Leandro Soria (Godoy Cruz)
- (United States) Matías Soria (Godoy Cruz)
- (Chile) Leandro Benegas (Independiente)
- (United States) Alan Soñora (Independiente)
- (Chile) Gabriel Arias (Racing)
- (Uruguay) Nicolás de la Cruz (River Plate)
- (Paraguay) David Martínez (River Plate)
- (Paraguay) Cristian Báez (Rosario Central)
- (Mexico) Luca Martínez (Rosario Central)
- (Paraguay) Néstor Ortigoza (San Lorenzo)
- (Slovenia) Andrés Vombergar (San Lorenzo)
- (Italy) Mateo Retegui (Tigre)
- (Brazil) Lenny Lobato (Vélez Sarsfield)

Source: AFA

== League table ==
Pos	Team	Pld	W	D	L	GF	GA	GD	Pts	Qualification
1	Boca Juniors (C)	27	16	4	7	34	28	+6	52	Qualification for Copa Libertadores group stage
2	Racing	27	14	8	5	41	24	+17	50	
3	River Plate	27	14	5	8	43	22	+21	47	
4	Huracán	27	12	11	4	35	21	+14	47	
5	Atlético Tucumán	27	12	10	5	32	22	+10	46	
6	San Lorenzo	27	10	13	4	33	23	+10	43	
7	Tigre	27	11	10	6	41	32	+9	43	
8	Argentinos Juniors	27	12	6	9	33	24	+9	42	
9	Gimnasia y Esgrima (LP)	27	11	8	8	26	18	+8	41	
10	Patronato	27	11	7	9	31	27	+4	40	
11	Newell's Old Boys	27	11	7	9	26	22	+4	40	
12	Defensa y Justicia	27	10	10	7	29	27	+2	40	
13	Talleres (C)	27	9	8	10	28	26	+2	35	
14	Independiente	27	9	8	10	31	31	0	35	
15	Godoy Cruz	27	9	8	10	25	29	−4	35	
16	Central Córdoba (SdE)	27	10	4	13	34	37	−3	34	
17	Barracas Central	27	8	10	9	31	37	−6	34	
18	Estudiantes (LP)	27	9	6	12	28	40	−12	33	
19	Platense	27	7	11	9	23	25	−2	32	
20	Rosario Central	27	7	11	9	24	28	−4	32	
21	Sarmiento (J)	27	8	8	11	27	32	−5	32	
22	Unión	27	8	8	11	28	36	−8	32	
23	Arsenal	27	6	12	9	28	29	−1	30	
24	Banfield	27	7	9	11	23	29	−6	30	
25	Colón	27	7	8	12	24	36	−12	29	
26	Vélez Sarsfield	27	6	10	11	30	33	−3	28	
27	Lanús	27	5	6	16	22	40	−18	21	
28	Aldosivi	27	4	4	19	16	48	−32	16	

Source: AFA
Rules for classification: 1) points; 2) play-off (only if needed to decide championship); 3) goal difference; 4) goals scored; 5) head-to-head points; 6) head-to-head goal difference; 7) head-to-head goals scored.
(C) Champions

== Results ==
Teams played every other team once (either at home or away) completing a total of 27 rounds.

Home \ Away	ALD	ARG	ARS	ATU	BAN	BAR	BOC	CCO	COL	DYJ	EST	GLP	GOD	HUR	IND	LAN	NOB	PAT	PLA	RAC	RIV	ROS	SLO	SAR	TAL	TIG	UNI	VEL
Aldosivi				0–1	0–1	2–0		0–3			0–1			0–1			1–2		0–0		0–3	2–1		1–2	1–3			3–2
Argentinos Juniors	2–1		1–1	1–2			2–0				1–0			1–1	2–1				0–2		0–3	2–1	0–1			2–1	2–0	2–0
Arsenal	3–0			3–1	0–0	1–2		2–0			2–1			1–1	0–1				1–1		0–0	0–3			1–1			2–2
Atlético Tucumán					0–0	4–0		1–0	1–1		3–1	2–0	1–1			2–1	2–0		2–1			1–1		1–0	1–1		1–1	
Banfield		1–1				1–1		2–1	2–1	1–2		0–2	1–1			1–2	1–2	0–0		0–2			1–1	0–0			2–3	
Barracas Central		1–3					1–3	1–1	1–0	3–1		1–1	3–1			2–0	1–1	2–1		0–0			2–1	1–1			1–2	
Boca Juniors	2–1		2–1	2–1	0–3						3–1			0–0	2–2				2–1		1–0	0–0			1–0	5–3	1–2	1–0
Central Córdoba (SdE)		1–2					1–0		3–0	1–0		1–0	3–0			2–2	0–3	1–3		1–3			0–2	0–0		1–2		
Colón	1–1	0–4	1–1				1–2			1–2				0–1	0–3			1–0		0–2	1–0		0–0			2–1	2–2	2–1
Defensa y Justicia	3–2	2–1	0–0	3–1			0–1							1–1	2–1			2–1		3–3	0–0		0–0			0–0	1–0	1–1
Estudiantes (LP)					0–0	3–1		2–2	2–4	1–2		1–1	2–0			3–1	0–2	1–0		1–0				2–1	1–0		1–0	
Gimnasia y Esgrima (LP)	0–0	0–0	2–0				1–2		0–0	1–0			2–0		3–1	1–0		2–0		3–1			0–1			0–1		
Godoy Cruz	2–0	0–0	1–0				0–1		1–0	2–1					1–1	2–1		0–1		2–0			0–0			1–1		1–1
Huracán				0–0	3–1	1–1		2–0			3–1	0–1	0–0				1–0		2–0		3–2	2–0		4–1	1–0			
Independiente	3–0			0–1	1–0	2–2		1–2			2–1			1–1			1–0		1–3		0–1	0–0			1–0			1–1
Lanús	0–1	0–4	1–0				0–1		1–0	1–1				2–3	1–1			0–1		0–1			2–0			1–2		2–2
Newell's Old Boys		1–0	0–0				2–0		0–0	1–2		2–0	1–2			2–0		2–2		0–0			0–0	0–1		0–2		
Patronato	1–0	0–0	0–1	2–1			3–0							3–2	3–1				1–0		0–1	0–0	3–2			1–0	0–0	1–1
Platense					3–1	0–0		2–0	1–2	0–0	0–0	1–1	2–1			1–1	1–1			0–1				0–0	0–0		1–0	
Racing	5–0	1–0	1–1	2–0			0–0							2–0	1–0			1–0			1–2	4–3	1–2			3–3	2–1	2–0
River Plate				0–0	1–2	2–0		3–0			5–0	1–0	0–2			2–1	4–1		2–1			1–2		1–2	0–1			
Rosario Central					0–1	3–1		0–3	1–1	0–0	1–1	0–1	1–0			0–0	1–0		1–1					1–0	1–0		1–1	
San Lorenzo	3–0		3–3	1–1			2–1				0–0			1–0	1–1				2–0		0–1	1–1			1–1	1–1	2–2	1–0
Sarmiento (J)		1–0	2–0				0–1		1–3	2–0		0–0	1–2		1–2	2–1		3–1		1–1			2–4			2–2		
Talleres (C)		2–0			1–0	0–2		0–2	2–0	1–0		2–1	3–1			0–1	0–1	3–3		1–1				2–0			2–2	
Tigre	3–0		1–4	0–0	0–1	1–1					2–1			1–1	2–1				3–0		1–1	3–1			1–1			2–0
Unión	0–0		1–0					1–4				0–2	2–1	0–0	0–1	3–0	0–1				1–5			1–0		1–2		2–1
Vélez Sarsfield				0–1	1–0	1–0		3–1			4–0	1–1		1–1			0–1		0–1		2–2	2–0		1–1	2–1			

Source: AFA
Legend: Blue = home team win; Yellow = draw; Red = away team win.

== Season statistics ==
=== Top goalscorers ===
Rank	Player	Club	Goals
1	(Italy) Mateo Retegui	Tigre	19
2	(Argentina) Franco Cristaldo	Huracán	14
3	(Argentina) Enzo Copetti	Racing	11
4	(Paraguay) Adam Bareiro	San Lorenzo	10
5	(Uruguay) Renzo López	Central Córdoba (SdE)	9
5	(Colombia) Miguel Borja	River Plate	9
7	(Paraguay) Cristian Colmán	Arsenal / Barracas Central	8
7	(Argentina) Ramón Ábila	Colón	8
7	(Argentina) Leandro Fernández	Independiente	8
7	(Paraguay) Blas Armoa	Tigre	8

Source: AFA

=== Top assists ===
Rank	Player	Club	Assists
1	(Argentina) Gastón Togni	Defensa y Justicia	9
1	(Argentina) Martín Ojeda	Godoy Cruz	9
3	(Colombia) Sebastián Villa	Boca Juniors	7
3	(Argentina) Rodrigo Garro	Talleres (C)	7
5	(Paraguay) Iván Ramírez	Central Córdoba (SdE)	6
5	(Argentina) Facundo Colidio	Tigre	6
7	(Paraguay) Gabriel Ávalos	Argentinos Juniors	5
7	(Argentina) Iván Tapia	Barracas Central	5
7	(Argentina) Francisco González Metilli	Central Córdoba (SdE)	5
7	(Argentina) Franco Zapiola	Estudiantes (LP)	5
7	(Argentina) Franco Cristaldo	Huracán	5
7	(Uruguay) Nicolás de la Cruz	River Plate	5
7	(Colombia) Juan Fernando Quintero	River Plate	5
7	(Argentina) Lautaro Blanco	Rosario Central	5

Source: AFA

== International qualification ==
The 2022 Argentine Primera División champions, 2022 Copa de la Liga Profesional champions and 2021–22 Copa Argentina champions earned a berth to the 2023 Copa Libertadores. The remaining berths to the 2023 Copa Libertadores as well as the ones to the 2023 Copa Sudamericana were determined by an aggregate table of the 2022 Argentine Primera División and 2022 Copa de la Liga Profesional first stage tournaments. The top three teams in the aggregate table not already qualified for any international tournament qualified for the Copa Libertadores, while the next six teams qualified for the Copa Sudamericana.

=== Aggregate table ===
Pos	Team	Pld	W	D	L	GF	GA	GD	Pts	Qualification
1	Racing	41	22	14	5	66	34	+32	80	Qualification for Copa Libertadores group stage (Note: Boca Juniors qualified for the Copa Libertadores group stage by winning the 2022 Argentine Primera División. As Boca Juniors also won the 2022 Copa de la Liga Profesional, Racing (best team in the aggregate table) earned the Copa de la Liga Profesional berth. Patronato qualified for the Copa Libertadores group stage by winning the 2021–22 Copa Argentina.)
2	Boca Juniors	41	23	10	8	53	39	+14	79	Qualification for Copa Libertadores group stage
3	River Plate	41	23	7	11	74	34	+40	76	Qualification for Copa Libertadores group stage
4	Argentinos Juniors	41	19	10	12	54	40	+14	67	Qualification for Copa Libertadores group stage
5	Huracán	41	17	14	10	52	40	+12	65	Qualification for Copa Libertadores second stage
6	Gimnasia y Esgrima (LP)	41	18	11	12	50	38	+12	65	Qualification for Copa Sudamericana group stage
7	Defensa y Justicia	41	17	14	10	55	46	+9	65	Qualification for Copa Sudamericana group stage
8	Tigre	41	16	15	10	58	44	+14	63	Qualification for Copa Sudamericana group stage
9	Newell's Old Boys	41	18	9	14	43	37	+6	63	Qualification for Copa Sudamericana group stage
10	Estudiantes (LP)	41	17	10	14	61	60	+1	61	Qualification for Copa Sudamericana group stage
11	San Lorenzo	41	13	19	9	48	40	+8	58	Qualification for Copa Sudamericana group stage
12	Atlético Tucumán	41	14	15	12	45	45	0	57	
13	Sarmiento (J)	41	14	11	16	44	56	−12	53	
14	Barracas Central	41	14	11	16	48	61	−13	53	
15	Independiente	41	12	15	14	48	49	−1	51	
16	Godoy Cruz	41	12	15	14	46	53	−7	51	
17	Patronato	41	14	8	19	41	52	−11	50	Qualification for Copa Libertadores group stage
18	Banfield	41	12	13	16	41	44	−3	49	
19	Central Córdoba (SdE)	41	13	10	18	51	60	−9	49	
20	Unión	41	13	10	18	39	49	−10	49	
21	Arsenal	41	9	20	12	48	48	0	47	
22	Vélez Sarsfield	41	10	16	15	43	45	−2	46	
23	Rosario Central	41	11	13	17	40	48	−8	46	
24	Talleres (C)	41	12	10	19	37	47	−10	46	
25	Colón	41	10	15	16	42	55	−13	45	
26	Platense	41	9	15	17	35	48	−13	42	
27	Lanús	41	8	12	21	39	58	−19	36	
28	Aldosivi	41	10	6	25	33	64	−31	36	

Source: AFA
Rules for classification: 1) points; 2) goal difference; 3) goals scored; 4) head-to-head points; 5) head-to-head goal difference; 6) head-to-head goals scored.

== Relegation ==
Relegation at the end of the season was based on coefficients, which take into consideration the points obtained by the clubs during the present season (aggregate table points) and the two previous seasons (only seasons at the top flight are counted). The total tally was then divided by the number of games played in the top flight over those three seasons and an average was calculated. The two teams with the worst average at the end of the season were relegated to Primera Nacional. Relegation was reinstated starting from this season after it was suspended by AFA at the end of the 2019–20 season due to the COVID-19 pandemic.

Pos	Team	2019–20 Pts	2021 Pts	2022 Pts	Total Pts	Total Pld	Avg	Relegation
1	River Plate	47	75	76	198	103	1.922	
2	Boca Juniors	51	63	79	193	103	1.874	
3	Racing	42	53	80	175	103	1.699	
4	Defensa y Justicia	39	59	65	163	103	1.583	
5	Argentinos Juniors	42	51	67	160	103	1.553	
6	Tigre	—	—	63	63	41	1.537	
7	Vélez Sarsfield	39	70	46	155	103	1.505	
8	Estudiantes (LP)	30	61	61	152	103	1.476	
9	Talleres (C)	37	66	46	149	103	1.447	
10	San Lorenzo	39	48	58	145	103	1.408	
11	Independiente	32	58	51	141	103	1.369	
12	Gimnasia y Esgrima (LP)	24	51	65	140	103	1.359	
13	Newell's Old Boys	38	39	63	140	103	1.359	
14	Huracán	22	51	65	138	103	1.34	
15	Barracas Central	—	—	53	53	41	1.293	
16	Rosario Central	36	50	46	132	103	1.282	
17	Colón	21	64	45	130	103	1.262	
18	Unión	28	53	49	130	103	1.262	
19	Atlético Tucumán	32	40	57	129	103	1.252	
20	Lanús	36	56	36	128	103	1.243	
21	Banfield	27	47	49	123	103	1.194	
22	Central Córdoba (SdE)	26	43	49	118	103	1.146	
23	Sarmiento (J)	—	36	53	89	79	1.127	
24	Arsenal	35	33	47	115	103	1.117	
25	Godoy Cruz	18	46	51	115	103	1.117	
26	Platense	—	45	42	87	79	1.101	
27	Patronato (R)	23	37	50	110	103	1.068	Relegation to Primera Nacional
28	Aldosivi (R)	22	44	36	102	103	0.99	Relegation to Primera Nacional

Source: AFA
