= 2023 AFA Liga Profesional de Fútbol =

Liga Profesional de Fútbol
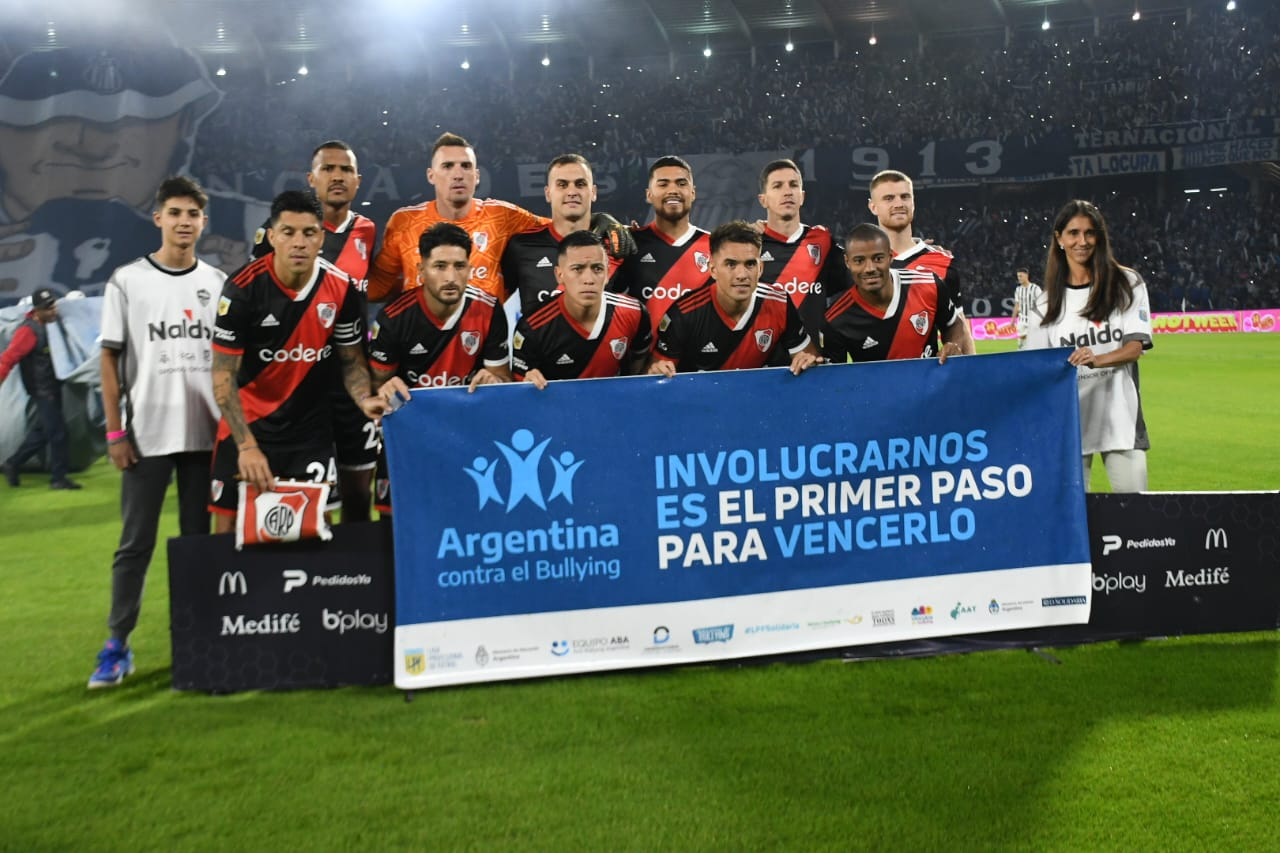
- River Plate, champions
- Season: 2023
- Dates: 27 January – 30 July 2023
- Champions: River Plate (38th title)
- Relegated: Arsenal; Colón
- Copa Libertadores: River Plate; Talleres (C); San Lorenzo; Godoy Cruz; Rosario Central (via Copa de la Liga Profesional); Estudiantes (LP) (via Copa Argentina)
- Copa Sudamericana: Boca Juniors; Racing; Defensa y Justicia; Lanús; Belgrano; Argentinos Juniors
- Matches: 378
- Goals: 778 (2.06 per match)
- Top goalscorer: Michael Santos; Pablo Vegetti (13 goals each)
- Biggest home win: Five matches 4–0; One match 5–1
- Biggest away win: Colón 0–4 Racing (2 July 2023)
- Highest scoring: Sarmiento (J) 3–5 Barracas Central (4 February 2023); Godoy Cruz 4–4 Lanús (17 April 2023)
- Longest winning run: River Plate; 8 games
- Longest unbeaten run: Estudiantes (LP); 11 games
- Longest winless run: Vélez Sarsfield; 13 games
- Longest losing run: Huracán; 5 games

The 2023 Liga Profesional de Fútbol (officially the Torneo Binance 2023, until the 26th round, for sponsorship reasons) was the 133rd season of top-flight professional football in Argentina. The league season began on 27 January and ended on 30 July 2023.

Twenty-eight teams competed in the league: twenty-six returning from the 2022 season as well as two promoted teams from the 2022 Primera Nacional (Belgrano and Instituto). Boca Juniors were the defending champions.

River Plate won their 38th national league championship with two matches to spare after they defeated Estudiantes (LP) 3–1 on 15 July 2023.

== Competition format ==
The competition was run under a single round-robin, contested by 28 teams (26 from the previous edition plus 2 promoted from Primera Nacional). The champions qualified for the 2024 Copa Libertadores as Argentina 1. The qualification for international tournaments will be determined by an aggregate table of the 2023 Primera División and 2023 Copa de la Liga Profesional first stage tournaments.

In this season two teams were relegated to the Primera Nacional. One team was relegated based on coefficients, while the bottom team of the 2023 aggregate table would also be relegated.

== Club information ==
=== Stadia and locations ===
Locations of the 2023 Argentine Primera División teams outside Greater Buenos Aires.
Locations of the 2023 Argentine Primera División teams within Greater Buenos Aires.

Club	City	Stadium	Capacity
Argentinos Juniors	Buenos Aires	Diego Armando Maradona	25,000
Arsenal	Sarandí	Julio Humberto Grondona	16,300
Atlético Tucumán	Tucumán	Monumental José Fierro	32,700
Banfield	Banfield	Florencio Sola	34,901
Barracas Central	Buenos Aires	Claudio "Chiqui" Tapia	4,400
Belgrano	Córdoba	Julio César Villagra	30,000
Boca Juniors	Buenos Aires	Alberto J. Armando	54,000
Central Córdoba (SdE)	Santiago del Estero	Único Madre de Ciudades	30,000
Central Córdoba (SdE)	Santiago del Estero	Alfredo Terrera	16,000
Colón	Santa Fe	Brigadier General Estanislao López	40,000
Defensa y Justicia	Florencio Varela	Norberto "Tito" Tomaghello	12,000
Estudiantes (LP)	La Plata	Jorge Luis Hirschi	30,000
Gimnasia y Esgrima (LP)	La Plata	Juan Carmelo Zerillo	24,544
Godoy Cruz	Godoy Cruz	Feliciano Gambarte	14,000
Godoy Cruz	Godoy Cruz	Malvinas Argentinas	42,000
Huracán	Buenos Aires	Tomás Adolfo Ducó	48,314
Independiente	Avellaneda	Libertadores de América	52,853
Instituto	Córdoba	Juan Domingo Perón	26,535
Lanús	Lanús	Ciudad de Lanús - Néstor Díaz Pérez	46,619
Newell's Old Boys	Rosario	Marcelo Bielsa	38,095
Platense	Florida Este	Ciudad de Vicente López	28,530
Racing	Avellaneda	El Cilindro	55,389
River Plate	Buenos Aires	Mâs Monumental	83,196
Rosario Central	Rosario	Gigante de Arroyito	41,654
San Lorenzo	Buenos Aires	Pedro Bidegain	39,494
Sarmiento (J)	Junín	Eva Perón	19,000
Talleres (C)	Córdoba	Mario Alberto Kempes	57,000
Tigre	Victoria	José Dellagiovanna	26,282
Unión	Santa Fe	15 de Abril	22,852
Vélez Sarsfield	Buenos Aires	José Amalfitani	45,540

=== Personnel ===
Club	Manager	Kit manufacturer	Sponsor
Argentinos Juniors	(Argentina) Pablo Guede	Umbro	
Arsenal	(Argentina) Darío Espínola (caretaker)	Sport Lyon	RapiCuota$
Atlético Tucumán	(Argentina) Favio Orsi and (Argentina) Sergio Gómez	Umbro	RapiCuota$
Banfield	(Argentina) Julio César Falcioni	Athix	Sur Finanzas
Barracas Central	(Argentina) Sergio Rondina	Il Ossso Sports	La Nueva Seguros
Belgrano	(Argentina) Guillermo Farré	Erreà	Banco Macro
Boca Juniors	(Argentina) Mariano Herrón (caretaker)	Adidas	Betsson
Central Córdoba (SdE)	(Argentina) Omar De Felippe	Adhoc	Banco Santiago del Estero
Colón	(Argentina) Israel Damonte	KDY	Cablevideo Digital
Defensa y Justicia	(Argentina) Julio Vaccari	Sport Lyon	RapiCuota$
Estudiantes (LP)	(Argentina) Eduardo Domínguez	RUGE	B•play
Gimnasia y Esgrima (LP)	(Argentina) Leonardo Madelón	Givova	RapiCuota$
Godoy Cruz	(Argentina) Daniel Oldrá	Fiume Sport	CATA Internacional
Huracán	(Argentina) Diego Martínez	Kappa	DECRYPTO
Independiente	(Argentina) Carlos Tevez	Puma	Jeluz
Instituto	(Argentina) Diego Dabove	Sport Lyon	Banco Macro
Lanús	(Argentina) Ricardo Zielinski	Erreà	Mapei
Newell's Old Boys	(Argentina) Gabriel Heinze	Givova	City Center ONLINE
Platense	(Argentina) Martín Palermo	Hummel	TRF
Racing	(Argentina) Sebastián Grazzini and (Argentina) Ezequiel Videla (caretakers)	Kappa	DIGITAL Ad Expert
River Plate	(Argentina) Martín Demichelis	Adidas	Codere
Rosario Central	(Argentina) Miguel Ángel Russo	Umbro	City Center ONLINE
San Lorenzo	(Argentina) Rubén Darío Insúa	Nike	Brubank
Sarmiento (J)	(Argentina) Facundo Sava	Coach	Naldo
Talleres (C)	(Argentina) Javier Gandolfi	Givova	ICBC Argentina
Tigre	(Argentina) Lucas Pusineri	Kappa	Banco Macro
Unión	(Argentina) Kily González	KDY	OSPAT
Vélez Sarsfield	(Argentina) Sebastián Méndez	Diadora	B•play

=== Managerial changes ===
Team	Outgoing manager	Manner of departure	Date of vacancy	Position in table	Replaced by	Date of appointment
Central Córdoba (SdE)	(Argentina) Abel Balbo	Signed by Estudiantes (LP)	22 October 2022	Pre-season	(Argentina) Leonardo Madelón	29 November 2022
Estudiantes (LP)	(Argentina) Pablo Quatrocchi	End of caretaker spell	22 October 2022	Pre-season	(Argentina) Abel Balbo	1 December 2022
Newell's Old Boys	(Argentina) Adrián Coria	End of caretaker spell	24 October 2022	Pre-season	(Argentina) Gabriel Heinze	7 November 2022
Arsenal	(Argentina) Leonardo Madelón	Resigned	24 October 2022	Pre-season	(Argentina) Carlos Ruiz and (Argentina) Martín Cicotello ^{1}	22 November 2022
Platense	(Argentina) Omar De Felippe	Resigned	25 October 2022	Pre-season	(Argentina) Martín Palermo	5 November 2022
Godoy Cruz	(Argentina) Favio Orsi and (Argentina) Sergio Gómez	Mutual agreement	28 October 2022	Pre-season	(Argentina) Diego Flores	3 November 2022
Rosario Central	(Argentina) Carlos Tevez	Resigned	3 November 2022	Pre-season	(Argentina) Miguel Ángel Russo	18 December 2022
Independiente	(Argentina) Julio César Falcioni	Mutual agreement	9 November 2022	Pre-season	(Argentina) Leandro Stillitano	12 November 2022
River Plate	(Argentina) Marcelo Gallardo	End of contract	13 November 2022	Pre-season	(Argentina) Martín Demichelis	16 November 2022
Gimnasia y Esgrima (LP)	(Argentina) Néstor Gorosito	Mutual agreement	30 December 2022	Pre-season	(Argentina) Sebastián Romero	30 December 2022
Liga Profesional changes
Colón	(Uruguay) Marcelo Saralegui	Mutual agreement	20 February 2023	26th	(Argentina) Néstor Gorosito	22 February 2023
Vélez Sarsfield	(Uruguay) Alexander Medina	Mutual agreement	25 February 2023	15th	(Argentina) Ricardo Gareca ^{2}	8 March 2023
Estudiantes (LP)	(Argentina) Abel Balbo	Mutual agreement	4 March 2023	22nd	(Argentina) Eduardo Domínguez	7 March 2023
Independiente	(Argentina) Leandro Stillitano	Mutual agreement	18 March 2023	19th	(Argentina) Ricardo Zielinski ^{3}	14 April 2023
Boca Juniors	(Argentina) Hugo Ibarra	Sacked	28 March 2023	14th	(Argentina) Jorge Almirón ^{4}	10 April 2023
Unión	(Uruguay) Gustavo Munúa	Sacked	4 April 2023	27th	(Argentina) Sebastián Méndez ^{5}	13 April 2023
Godoy Cruz	(Argentina) Diego Flores	Sacked	10 April 2023	17th	(Argentina) Daniel Oldrá ^{6}	11 April 2023
Barracas Central	(Argentina) Rodolfo de Paoli and (Argentina) Alejandro Milano	Mutual agreement	11 April 2023	21st	(Argentina) Sergio Rondina	12 April 2023
Huracán	(Argentina) Diego Dabove	Mutual agreement	7 May 2023	22nd	(Argentina) Sebastián Battaglia	9 May 2023
Banfield	(Argentina) Javier Sanguinetti	Mutual agreement	7 May 2023	23rd	(Argentina) Julio César Falcioni	9 May 2023
Arsenal	(Argentina) Carlos Ruiz and (Argentina) Martín Cicotello	Resigned	8 May 2023	27th	(Argentina) Federico Vilar ^{7}	20 May 2023
Instituto	(Argentina) Lucas Bovaglio	Mutual agreement	3 June 2023	20th	(Argentina) Diego Dabove ^{8}	9 June 2023
Vélez Sarsfield	(Argentina) Ricardo Gareca	Resigned	4 June 2023	22nd	(Argentina) Sebastián Méndez ^{9}	27 June 2023
Tigre	(Argentina) Diego Martínez	Sacked	13 June 2023	20th	(Argentina) Juan Sara	20 June 2023
Unión	(Argentina) Sebastián Méndez	Signed by Vélez Sarsfield	25 June 2023	21st	(Argentina) Kily González	26 June 2023
Huracán	(Argentina) Sebastián Battaglia	Sacked	28 June 2023	25th	(Argentina) Diego Martínez ^{10}	3 July 2023
Atlético Tucumán	(Argentina) Lucas Pusineri	Resigned	30 June 2023	21st	(Argentina) Favio Orsi and (Argentina) Sergio Gómez	3 July 2023
Inter-tournament changes
Sarmiento (J)	(Argentina) Israel Damonte	Resigned	29 July 2023	N/A	(Argentina) Pablo Lavallén	2 August 2023
Central Córdoba (SdE)	(Argentina) Leonardo Madelón	Sacked	3 August 2023	N/A	(Argentina) Omar De Felippe	7 August 2023
Copa de la Liga Profesional changes
Independiente	(Argentina) Ricardo Zielinski	Resigned	20 August 2023	13th Zone A	(Argentina) Carlos Tevez	22 August 2023
Tigre	(Argentina) Juan Sara	Sacked	28 August 2023	13th Zone B	(Argentina) Lucas Pusineri	30 August 2023
Argentinos Juniors	(Argentina) Gabriel Milito	Resigned	30 August 2023	7th Zone A	(Argentina) Pablo Guede ^{11}	8 September 2023
Gimnasia y Esgrima (LP)	(Argentina) Sebastián Romero	Mutual agreement	2 September 2023	14th Zone A	(Argentina) Leonardo Madelón	5 September 2023
Lanús	(Argentina) Frank Darío Kudelka	Mutual agreement	6 September 2023	12th Zone B	(Argentina) Sebastián Salomón ^{12}	7 September 2023
Arsenal	(Argentina) Federico Vilar	Resigned	18 September 2023	12th Zone A	(Argentina) Darío Espínola ^{13}	19 September 2023
Racing	(Argentina) Fernando Gago	Resigned	30 September 2023	1st Zone B	(Argentina) Sebastián Grazzini and (Argentina) Ezequiel Videla ^{14}	2 October 2023
Lanús	(Argentina) Sebastián Salomón	Replaced	9 October 2023	14th Zone B	(Argentina) Ricardo Zielinski	10 October 2023
Sarmiento (J)	(Argentina) Pablo Lavallén	Sacked	25 October 2023	9th Zone B	(Argentina) Facundo Sava	27 October 2023
Colón	(Argentina) Néstor Gorosito	Resigned	26 October 2023	6th Zone A	(Argentina) Israel Damonte	27 October 2023
Boca Juniors	(Argentina) Jorge Almirón	Resigned	5 November 2023	11th Zone B	(Argentina) Mariano Herrón ^{13}	6 November 2023

1. Originally (Argentina) Luca Marcogiuseppe would be manager of Arsenal along with Carlos Ruiz, but he resigned before the beginning of the season. Marcogiuseppe was replaced by Martín Cicotello.

Interim managers

2. (Argentina) Marcelo Bravo and (Argentina) Hernán Manrique were interim managers in the 6th round.
3. Pedro Monzón was interim manager in the 2023 Copa Argentina round of 64 and the 9th–11th rounds.
4. (Argentina) Mariano Herrón was interim manager in the 9th–10th rounds and the 2023 Copa Libertadores Group stage 1st round.
5. (Argentina) Marcelo Mosset was interim manager in the 10th–11th rounds.
6. Interim manager, but later promoted to manager.
7. (Argentina) Darío Espínola was interim manager in the 16th–17th rounds.
8. Daniel Jiménez was interim manager in the 2023 Copa Argentina round of 64.
9. Marcelo Bravo was interim manager in the 2023 Copa Argentina round of 64, the postponed 17th round and the 20th–21st rounds.
10. (Argentina) Claudio Cabrera and (Argentina) Marcelo Broggi were interim managers in the 22nd round.
11. (Argentina) Cristian Zermatten was interim manager in the 2023 Copa de la Liga Profesional Group stage 3rd round.
12. Salomón would be interim manager until the end of the Copa de la Liga Profesional, but only was interim manager in the 2023 Copa de la Liga Profesional Group stage 4th–8th rounds.
13. Interim manager until the end of the Copa de la Liga Profesional.
14. Interim managers until the end of the Copa de la Liga Profesional.

=== Foreign players ===
As the championship ended on 30 July 2023, several players left their teams due to expiring contracts or loans, signed with other teams, or had their contracts terminated. Players in italics are those who left their club before the end of the tournament.

Club	Player 1	Player 2	Player 3	Player 4	Player 5	Player 6
Argentinos Juniors	(Paraguay) Gabriel Ávalos	(Uruguay) Javier Cabrera	(Paraguay) Juan José Cardozo	(Uruguay) Fabricio Domínguez	(Uruguay) Alan Rodríguez	
Arsenal	(Colombia) Juan Manuel Cuesta	(Colombia) Flabián Londoño	(São Tomé and Príncipe) Luís Leal	(Uruguay) Santiago Paiva		
Atlético Tucumán	(Paraguay) Marcelo González	(Paraguay) Wilson Ibarrola				
Banfield	(Uruguay) Brahian Alemán	(Venezuela) Luis Mago	(Colombia) Alejandro Piedrahita	(Uruguay) Nicolás Sosa	(Uruguay) Sebastián Sosa Sánchez	
Barracas Central	(Uruguay) Fernando Prado	(Colombia) Kevin Quejada				
Belgrano	(Colombia) Andrés Amaya	(Chile) Alex Ibacache				
Boca Juniors	(Peru) Luis Advíncula	(Uruguay) Miguel Merentiel	(Paraguay) Óscar Romero	(Paraguay) Bruno Valdez	(Colombia) Sebastián Villa	
Central Córdoba (SdE)	(Colombia) Mauricio Duarte					
Colón	(Paraguay) Carlos Arrúa	(Paraguay) Jorge Benítez	(Uruguay) José Neris	(Colombia) Baldomero Perlaza	(Uruguay) Andrew Teuten	
Defensa y Justicia	(Paraguay) Ángel Benítez	(Paraguay) Rodrigo Bogarín	(Paraguay) Darío Cáceres	(Colombia) Edwin Mosquera	(Uruguay) Agustín Sant'Anna	
Estudiantes (LP)	(Uruguay) Mauro Méndez					
Gimnasia y Esgrima (LP)						
Godoy Cruz	(Uruguay) Nicolás Fernández	(Chile) Thomas Galdames	(Uruguay) Enzo Larrosa	(Paraguay) Cristian Núñez	(Uruguay) Salomón Rodríguez	
Huracán	(Uruguay) Matías Cóccaro	(Chile) Guillermo Soto				
Independiente	(Uruguay) Baltasar Barcia	(Uruguay) Martín Cauteruccio	(Ecuador) Juan Cazares	(Colombia) Mauricio Cuero	(Uruguay) Edgar Elizalde	(Uruguay) Diego Segovia
Instituto	(Paraguay) Juan José Franco	(Uruguay) Joaquín Varela				
Lanús	(Colombia) Felipe Aguilar	(Uruguay) Luciano Boggio	(Paraguay) José Canale	(Paraguay) Iván Cazal	(Colombia) Raúl Loaiza	
Newell's Old Boys^{[a]}	(Colombia) Willer Ditta	(Uruguay) Armando Méndez	(Colombia) Jherson Mosquera	(Ecuador) Djorkaeff Reasco	(Paraguay) Jorge Recalde	(Paraguay) Gustavo Velázquez
Platense	(Paraguay) Miguel Jacquet	(Paraguay) Ronaldo Martínez				
Racing	(Colombia) Johan Carbonero	(Colombia) Edwin Cardona	(Peru) Paolo Guerrero	(Chile) Óscar Opazo	(Paraguay) Matías Rojas	
River Plate	(Colombia) Miguel Borja	(Chile) Paulo Díaz	(Paraguay) Robert Rojas	(Venezuela) Salomón Rondón		
Rosario Central	(Colombia) Jaminton Campaz	(Uruguay) Jhonatan Candia	(Uruguay) Facundo Mallo	(Paraguay) Alan Rodríguez		
San Lorenzo	(Paraguay) Adam Bareiro	(Colombia) Diego Perea	(Colombia) Rafa Pérez	(Colombia) Carlos Sánchez		
Sarmiento (J)	(Uruguay) Ayrton Cougo	(Uruguay) Emanuel Hernández	(Colombia) Harrinson Mancilla	(Paraguay) Fernando Martínez	(Uruguay) Jean Rosso	
Talleres (C)	(Chile) Vicente Fernández	(Ecuador) Alan Franco	(Uruguay) Christian Oliva	(Uruguay) Michael Santos	(Paraguay) Ramón Sosa	(Colombia) Diego Valoyes
Tigre	(Paraguay) Blas Armoa	(Paraguay) Santiago Rojas				
Unión	(Colombia) Bryan Castrillón	(Colombia) Yeison Gordillo	(Paraguay) Junior Marabel	(Uruguay) Santiago Mele	(Uruguay) Thiago Vecino	
Vélez Sarsfield	(Uruguay) Leonardo Burián	(Paraguay) José Florentín	(Uruguay) Diego Godín			

^{a} Newell's Old Boys signed a seventh foreign player due to left knee injury of (Colombia) Fabián Ángel.

==== Players holding Argentinian dual nationality ====
They do not take up a foreign slot.

- (Switzerland) Dylan Gissi (Banfield)
- (Italy) Bruno Zapelli (Belgrano)
- (Armenia) Norberto Briasco (Boca Juniors)
- (Colombia) Frank Fabra (Boca Juniors)
- (Mexico) Luciano Bocco (Central Córdoba (SdE))
- (United States) Matías Soria (Godoy Cruz)
- (Paraguay) Cristian Báez (Independiente)
- (Paraguay) Juan José Cáceres (Lanús)
- (Chile) Gabriel Arias (Racing)
- (Peru) Catriel Cabellos (Racing)
- (Uruguay) Nicolás de la Cruz (River Plate)
- (Paraguay) David Martínez (River Plate)
- (Mexico) Luca Martínez (Rosario Central)
- (Italy) Agustín Módica (Rosario Central)
- (Paraguay) Iván Leguizamón (San Lorenzo)
- (Slovenia) Andrés Vombergar (San Lorenzo)
- (Italy) José Mauri (Sarmiento (J))
- (Chile) Matías Catalán (Talleres (C))
- (Bolivia) Daniel Ribera (Talleres (C))
- (Italy) Mateo Retegui (Tigre)
- (Brazil) Lenny Lobato (Vélez Sarsfield)

Tomás Avilés (Racing) played with Chile at the 2023 South American U-20 Championship in January 2023, but later played with Argentina at the 2023 FIFA U-20 World Cup in May 2023.
Source: AFA

== Incidents ==
The Unión vs. Lanús match (14th round, 30 April 2023) was postponed due to a lack of safety guarantees for the occupants of a seating area in the Estadio 15 de Abril, as a result of a landslide from a drainage channel caused by the strong winds that hit the stadium. The match was played on 17 June 2023.

The Vélez Sarsfield vs. Racing match (17th round, 19 May 2023) was postponed due to the death of Hernán Manrique, manager of Vélez Sarsfield reserve team along with Marcelo Bravo. The match was played on 17 June 2023.

During the match between River Plate and Defensa y Justicia at the Estadio Mâs Monumental (19th round, 3 June 2023), a fan fell to his death during the game, resulting in the match being suspended by the referee in the 26th minute. The match resumed on 17 June 2023.

== League table ==
Pos	Team	Pld	W	D	L	GF	GA	GD	Pts	Qualification
1	River Plate (C)	27	19	4	4	50	20	+30	61	Qualification for Copa Libertadores group stage
2	Talleres (C)	27	14	8	5	42	23	+19	50	
3	San Lorenzo	27	12	10	5	23	13	+10	46	
4	Lanús	27	12	9	6	38	27	+11	45	
5	Estudiantes (LP)	27	12	9	6	35	24	+11	45	
6	Defensa y Justicia	27	12	8	7	36	23	+13	44	
7	Boca Juniors	27	13	5	9	33	24	+9	44	
8	Rosario Central	27	10	12	5	36	29	+7	42	
9	Godoy Cruz	27	11	8	8	37	32	+5	41	
10	Argentinos Juniors	27	11	7	9	31	22	+9	40	
11	Atlético Tucumán	27	9	10	8	25	27	−2	37	
12	Racing	27	9	9	9	36	35	+1	36	
13	Belgrano	27	10	6	11	20	26	−6	36	
14	Newell's Old Boys	27	8	11	8	24	24	0	35	
15	Barracas Central	27	8	11	8	25	30	−5	35	
16	Tigre	27	9	7	11	27	29	−2	34	
17	Platense	27	9	7	11	26	29	−3	34	
18	Instituto	27	8	8	11	24	35	−11	32	
19	Sarmiento (J)	27	7	9	11	23	26	−3	30	
20	Unión	27	6	12	9	19	25	−6	30	
21	Banfield	27	7	9	11	21	32	−11	30	
22	Gimnasia y Esgrima (LP)	27	7	9	11	24	38	−14	30	
23	Central Córdoba (SdE)	27	7	8	12	20	30	−10	29	
24	Independiente	27	6	10	11	23	32	−9	28	
25	Vélez Sarsfield	27	5	12	10	24	27	−3	27	
26	Huracán	27	6	7	14	18	29	−11	25	
27	Colón	27	4	13	10	20	33	−13	25	
28	Arsenal	27	6	4	17	18	34	−16	22	

Source: AFA
Rules for classification: 1) points; 2) goal difference; 3) goals scored; 4) fair play ranking 5) drawing of lots.
(C) Champions

== Results ==
Teams played every other team once (either at home or away) completing a total of 27 rounds.

Home \ Away	ARG	ARS	ATU	BAN	BAR	BEL	BOC	CCO	COL	DYJ	EST	GLP	GOD	HUR	IND	INS	LAN	NOB	PLA	RAC	RIV	ROS	SLO	SAR	TAL	TIG	UNI	VEL
Argentinos Juniors		1–1				3–0	0–1		1–0	3–1	2–3	2–4	3–0		2–2	0–0			1–0	1–0							5–1	
Arsenal						0–1	1–0		2–0	1–2	1–1	0–1	2–3		2–1	0–2			0–2	0–3						2–0	2–1	
Atlético Tucumán	1–2	1–0		1–0	1–1							2–0	2–1		1–0						1–1	2–2	1–3		0–2		1–0	1–1
Banfield	1–0	0–0			0–0		1–0	1–0		0–3		0–0	2–0		0–0				0–2		1–4	2–0	1–2				0–0	
Barracas Central	0–0	0–0					0–3	2–2		0–2		1–0	0–1		1–1	3–0			1–0		2–1	0–0	1–0				1–1	
Belgrano			1–0	3–1	0–2									2–0			0–0	1–0			2–1	0–0	0–1	0–0	1–1	0–2		2–0
Boca Juniors			1–0			2–0		0–0	1–2	0–0	0–1			1–0		2–3	1–1	2–1	3–1	3–1				2–0		1–0		
Central Córdoba (SdE)	1–0	1–0	0–2			0–1						0–0	0–2	2–0	0–1		1–1	2–0			0–2			0–1		2–0	0–1	
Colón			0–0	2–0	1–1	0–0		2–2			1–0			1–1			1–2	1–1		0–4				0–2	2–2	1–3		2–1
Defensa y Justicia			3–0			2–0		1–2	2–0		1–1			2–4		1–0	2–2	1–0		1–1				3–0	1–1	1–0		0–0
Estudiantes (LP)			0–0	1–0	5–2	4–0		1–1						2–1			0–2	3–0		0–0			1–1	1–1	1–0	1–2		2–0
Gimnasia y Esgrima (LP)						0–2	1–3		0–0	0–2	2–1			1–0	1–1	2–0	1–0		1–1	3–1				0–0		1–1		
Godoy Cruz						3–1	4–0		1–0	2–2	0–1	2–0			2–1	4–2	4–4		2–1	2–0						1–1	0–0	
Huracán	0–0	2–1	0–1	3–2	2–0								0–0					1–1			0–3	0–2	1–1		0–1		0–1	1–0
Independiente						2–0	0–2		2–2	0–2	1–2			1–0		2–2	1–1	0–2	1–2	1–1				2–0		2–1		
Instituto			1–1	1–1		1–0		0–2	1–0		0–0			0–0			2–1	3–1		1–1				0–0	0–3	0–1		1–0
Lanús	0–0	3–0	2–1	2–2	2–0									1–0				1–0			0–2	3–0	2–1	2–1	2–1			0–1
Newell's Old Boys	0–0	2–0	0–0	2–0	1–0							2–2	2–0								0–1	0–0	1–0		1–1		1–1	1–0
Platense			1–1			1–0		1–1	0–0	1–0	1–2			0–1		1–0	0–1	2–2		3–0				1–0	2–4	1–0		
Racing			1–3	2–0	1–1	0–0		3–1						2–1			2–1	0–1				1–1	1–1	1–0	2–4	2–2		2–1
River Plate	2–1	1–2					1–0		2–0	1–0	3–1	3–0	3–0		2–0	3–1			2–1	2–1							1–0	
Rosario Central	1–0	2–1					2–2	2–0	1–1	2–1	0–0	3–1	1–0		1–0	4–1			4–0		3–3						1–1	
San Lorenzo	0–2	1–0					1–0	0–0	0–0	0–0		4–0	1–0		0–0	2–0			1–0		0–0	1–0					1–0	
Sarmiento (J)	2–0	1–0	4–1	0–0	3–5								1–1	0–0				0–0			0–2	4–1	0–1		0–1			1–1
Talleres (C)	1–0	1–0		0–1	3–0		2–1	2–0				2–2	1–1		0–1						2–1	3–1	0–0				0–0	1–2
Tigre	0–1		0–0	1–2	0–1									1–0			2–1	2–2			0–1	2–2	2–0	1–0	1–3			2–1
Unión						0–3	0–0		1–1	2–0	2–0	2–0			3–0	0–2	1–1		0–0	1–3				0–2		0–0		
Vélez Sarsfield	0–1	1–0		3–3	0–0		1–2	4–0				3–1	1–1		0–0				1–1		2–2	0–0	0–0				0–0	

Source: AFA
Legend: Blue = home team win; Yellow = draw; Red = away team win.

== Season statistics ==
=== Top goalscorers ===
Rank	Player	Club	Goals
1	(Argentina) Pablo Vegetti	Belgrano	13
1	(Uruguay) Michael Santos	Talleres (C)	13
3	(Paraguay) Gabriel Ávalos	Argentinos Juniors	12
3	(Argentina) Nicolás Fernández	Defensa y Justicia	12
3	(Argentina) Lucas Beltrán	River Plate	12
6	(Uruguay) Martín Cauteruccio	Independiente	11
6	(Argentina) Adrián Martínez	Instituto	11
6	(Argentina) Leandro Díaz	Lanús	11
6	(Argentina) Alejo Véliz	Rosario Central	11
6	(Italy) Mateo Retegui	Tigre	11

Source: AFA

=== Top assists ===
Rank	Player	Club	Assists
1	(Argentina) Ignacio Malcorra	Rosario Central	9
2	(Argentina) Pablo Solari	River Plate	7
3	(Argentina) Rodrigo Garro	Talleres (C)	6
3	(Colombia) Diego Valoyes	Talleres (C)	6
5	(Argentina) Lucas Gamba	Central Córdoba (SdE)	5
5	(Argentina) David Barbona	Defensa y Justicia	5
5	(Argentina) Gastón Togni	Defensa y Justicia	5
5	(Uruguay) Salomón Rodríguez	Godoy Cruz	5
5	(Colombia) Jaminton Campaz	Rosario Central	5
5	(Paraguay) Alan Rodríguez	Rosario Central	5
5	(Uruguay) Michael Santos	Talleres (C)	5

Source: AFA

== Awards ==
=== Best Team ===
The best team was a squad consisting of the most impressive players at the tournament.

Pos.	Player	Team
GK	(Argentina) Augusto Batalla	San Lorenzo
DF	(Argentina) Kevin Mac Allister	Argentinos Juniors
DF	(Argentina) Leandro González Pírez	River Plate
DF	(Argentina) Cristian Lema	Lanús
DF	(Argentina) Malcom Braida	San Lorenzo
MF	(Argentina) Rodrigo Aliendro	River Plate
MF	(Argentina) Ignacio Miramón	Gimnasia y Esgrima (LP)
MF	(Argentina) Nahuel Barrios	San Lorenzo
FW	(Argentina) Rodrigo Garro	Talleres (C)
FW	(Uruguay) Michael Santos	Talleres (C)
FW	(Argentina) Lucas Beltrán	River Plate

Substitutes

Pos.	Player	Team
GK	(Argentina) Guido Herrera	Talleres (C)
DF	(Argentina) Leonardo Godoy	Estudiantes (LP)
DF	(Argentina) Gastón Hernández	San Lorenzo
MF	(Argentina) Rodrigo Villagra	Talleres (C)
MF	(Argentina) Federico Redondo	Argentinos Juniors
MF	(Argentina) Cristian Medina	Boca Juniors
FW	(Argentina) Benjamín Rollheiser	Estudiantes (LP)
FW	(Argentina) Esequiel Barco	River Plate
FW	(Argentina) Pablo Vegetti	Belgrano
FW	(Argentina) Alejo Véliz	Rosario Central
FW	(Argentina) Nicolás Fernández	Defensa y Justicia

== Aggregate table ==
=== International qualification ===
The 2023 Argentine Primera División champions, 2023 Copa de la Liga Profesional champions and 2023 Copa Argentina champions earned a berth to the 2024 Copa Libertadores. The remaining berths to the 2024 Copa Libertadores as well as the ones to the 2024 Copa Sudamericana were determined by an aggregate table of the 2023 Argentine Primera División and 2023 Copa de la Liga Profesional first stage tournaments. The top three teams in the aggregate table not already qualified for any international tournament qualified for the Copa Libertadores, while the next six teams qualified for the Copa Sudamericana.

=== Relegation ===
In this season, the bottom team of the aggregate table would be relegated to the 2024 Primera Nacional. If two or more teams were level on points, extra matches would be played to decide which team would be relegated.

Pos	Team	Pld	W	D	L	GF	GA	GD	Pts	Qualification or relegation
1	River Plate	41	26	7	8	74	36	+38	85	Qualification for Copa Libertadores group stage (Note: River Plate, Rosario Central and Estudiantes (LP) qualified for the Copa Libertadores group stage by winning the 2023 Argentine Primera División, the 2023 Copa de la Liga Profesional and the 2023 Copa Argentina, respectively.)
2	Talleres (C)	41	18	13	10	57	38	+19	67	Qualification for Copa Libertadores group stage
3	Rosario Central	41	16	17	8	53	42	+11	65	Qualification for Copa Libertadores group stage
4	San Lorenzo	41	15	19	7	34	24	+10	64	Qualification for Copa Libertadores group stage
5	Godoy Cruz	41	16	15	10	51	41	+10	63	Qualification for Copa Libertadores second stage
6	Boca Juniors	41	18	8	15	50	40	+10	62	Qualification for Copa Sudamericana group stage
7	Estudiantes (LP)	41	16	14	11	46	37	+9	62	Qualification for Copa Libertadores group stage
8	Racing	41	15	15	11	58	51	+7	60	Qualification for Copa Sudamericana group stage
9	Defensa y Justicia	41	15	13	13	48	39	+9	58	Qualification for Copa Sudamericana group stage
10	Lanús	41	14	15	12	47	41	+6	57	Qualification for Copa Sudamericana group stage
11	Belgrano	41	15	12	14	40	44	−4	57	Qualification for Copa Sudamericana group stage
12	Argentinos Juniors	41	14	12	15	50	45	+5	54	Qualification for Copa Sudamericana group stage
13	Atlético Tucumán	41	13	15	13	34	39	−5	54	
14	Platense	41	14	12	15	39	45	−6	54	
15	Newell's Old Boys	41	13	14	14	38	34	+4	53	
16	Banfield	41	13	14	14	32	38	−6	53	
17	Instituto	41	12	16	13	35	42	−7	52	
18	Huracán	41	14	9	18	37	40	−3	51	
19	Independiente	41	12	15	14	38	43	−5	51	
20	Vélez Sarsfield	41	11	16	14	41	41	0	49	
21	Barracas Central	41	11	16	14	35	51	−16	49	
22	Central Córdoba (SdE)	41	12	12	17	31	44	−13	48	
23	Tigre	41	12	11	18	35	42	−7	47	
24	Sarmiento (J)	41	10	16	15	31	34	−3	46	
25	Unión	41	9	19	13	29	38	−9	46	
26	Gimnasia y Esgrima (LP) (O)	41	11	12	18	37	59	−22	45	Relegation playoff
27	Colón (R)	41	10	15	16	39	50	−11	45	Relegation to Primera Nacional (Note: Arsenal were relegated based on coefficients.)
28	Arsenal (R)	41	9	8	24	28	49	−21	35	Relegation to Primera Nacional

Source: AFA
Rules for classification: 1) points; 2) goal difference; 3) goals scored; 4) fair play ranking 5) drawing of lots.
(O) Play-off winners; (R) Relegated

==== Relegation playoff ====
As Colón and Gimnasia y Esgrima (LP) finished with the same number of points in the aggregate table, the tournament rules required them to play a playoff match at a neutral venue to determine the relegated team. If tied, extra time would be played and if the score was still tied after extra time, a penalty shoot-out would be used to determine the winners.

Gimnasia y Esgrima (LP) won the match 1–0 and remained in the Primera División, while Colón were relegated to the Primera Nacional.

1 December 2023
17:00 (UTC−3)

Gimnasia y Esgrima (LP)	1–0	Colón
Colazo 41'	Report

Estadio Marcelo Bielsa, Rosario
Referee: Andrés Merlos

== Relegation based on coefficients ==
In addition to the relegation based on the aggregate table, one team was relegated at the end of the season based on coefficients, which took into consideration the points obtained by the clubs during the present season (aggregate table points) and the two previous seasons (only seasons at the top flight were counted). The total tally was then divided by the number of games played in the top flight over those three seasons and an average was calculated. The team with the worst average at the end of the season was relegated to Primera Nacional. Originally two teams would be relegated based on coefficients but, on 22 June 2023, AFA decided to reduce the number of relegated teams to one.

Pos	Team	2021 Pts	2022 Pts	2023 Pts	Total Pts	Total Pld	Avg	Relegation
1	River Plate	75	76	85	236	120	1.967	
2	Boca Juniors	63	79	62	204	120	1.7	
3	Racing	53	80	60	193	120	1.608	
4	Estudiantes (LP)	61	61	62	184	120	1.533	
5	Defensa y Justicia	59	65	58	182	120	1.517	
6	Talleres (C)	66	46	67	179	120	1.492	
7	Argentinos Juniors	51	67	54	172	120	1.433	
8	San Lorenzo	48	58	64	170	120	1.417	
9	Huracán	51	65	51	167	120	1.392	
10	Belgrano	—	—	57	57	41	1.39	
11	Vélez Sarsfield	70	46	49	165	120	1.375	
12	Gimnasia y Esgrima (LP)	51	65	45	161	120	1.342	
13	Rosario Central	50	46	65	161	120	1.342	
14	Tigre	—	63	47	110	82	1.341	
15	Godoy Cruz	46	51	63	160	120	1.333	
16	Independiente	58	51	51	160	120	1.333	
17	Newell's Old Boys	39	63	53	155	120	1.292	
18	Colón	64	45	45	154	120	1.283	
19	Instituto	—	—	52	52	41	1.268	
20	Atlético Tucumán	40	57	54	151	120	1.258	
21	Barracas Central	—	53	49	102	82	1.244	
22	Banfield	47	49	53	149	120	1.242	
23	Lanús	56	36	57	149	120	1.242	
24	Unión	53	49	46	148	120	1.233	
25	Platense	45	42	54	141	120	1.175	
26	Central Córdoba (SdE)	43	49	48	140	120	1.167	
27	Sarmiento (J)	36	53	46	135	120	1.125	
28	Arsenal (R)	33	47	35	115	120	0.958	Relegation to Primera Nacional

Source: AFA

== Attendances ==
Source: AFA

No.	Club	Average
1	River Plate	84,742
2	Boca Juniors	57,381
3	Talleres	51,964
4	Racing Club	46,517
5	San Lorenzo	43,806
6	Newell's Old Boys	42,193
7	Independiente	41,659
8	Rosario Central	41,028
9	Belgrano	38,904
10	Vélez Sarsfield	35,771
11	Colón	32,418
12	Atlético Tucumán	31,682
13	Unión	30,847
14	Estudiantes de La Plata	30,195
15	Instituto	28,309
16	Lanús	25,974
17	GELP	21,562
18	Tigre	19,834
19	Godoy Cruz	19,276
20	Defensa y Justicia	14,905
21	Huracán	14,138
22	Argentinos Juniors	12,764
23	Banfield	12,391
24	Central Córdoba	10,658
25	Sarmiento	8,417
26	Platense	6,582
27	Barracas Central	4,961
28	Arsenal Fútbol Club	2,734

== See also ==
- 2023 Copa de la Liga Profesional
- 2023 Copa Argentina
