= Adrián Marini =

Argentine footballer and manager

Personal information
- Full name: Adrián Claudio Marini
- Date of birth: 14 October 1972 (age 54)
- Place of birth: Santa Fe, Argentina
- Position: Midfielder

Team information
- Current team: Colón (reserve manager)

Youth career
- Colón

Senior career*
Years	Team	Apps	(Gls)
1991–1997	Colón	177	(27)
1997–1998	Motagua		
1998–1999	Quilmes	52	(11)
2000–2001	All Boys	10	(0)
2002	Toros Neza	19	(5)
2003	San Martín SJ	7	(0)

Managerial career
- Colón (youth)
- 2021–: Colón (reserves)
- 2022: Colón (interim)
- * Club domestic league appearances and goals

Adrián Claudio Marini (born 14 October 1972) is an Argentine football manager and former player who played as a midfielder. He is the current manager of Colón's reserve team.

== Playing career ==
Born in Santa Fe, Marini began his career with Colón, scoring the goal which sealed the club's promotion to Primera División in 1995. He subsequently represented Motagua, Quilmes, All Boys and Toros Neza before retiring with San Martín de San Juan in 2003.

== Managerial career ==
On 5 February 2021, after several years working in the youth categories, Marini was named manager of the reserve side of Colón. On 8 July 2022, he was named interim manager of the main squad after Julio César Falcioni left.

Marini returned to his previous role after the appointment of Sergio Rondina, but was again interim after Rondina was sacked in August. On 29 August, he was permanently appointed manager.
