= Adrián Coria (football manager) =

Argentine footballer and manager (born 1959)

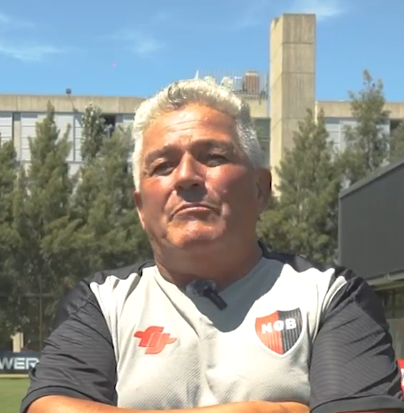
- Coria in 2024

Personal information
- Full name: Adrián Roberto Coria
- Date of birth: 16 May 1959 (age 67)
- Place of birth: Rosario, Argentina

Team information
- Current team: Newell's Old Boys (youth manager)

Managerial career
- Years: Team
- 1990–2003: Newell's Old Boys (youth)
- 2003–2004: Cerro Porteño (assistant)
- 2005: Colón (assistant)
- 2005–2006: Libertad (assistant)
- 2007–2011: Paraguay (assistant)
- 2008–2011: Paraguay U20
- 2012–2013: Newell's Old Boys (assistant)
- 2013–2014: Barcelona (assistant)
- 2014–2016: Argentina (assistant)
- 2017: Sportivo Luqueño
- 2019: Patronato (assistant)
- 2020: Godoy Cruz (assistant)
- 2020–2021: Sarmiento (assistant)
- 2021–: Newell's Old Boys (youth)
- 2022: Newell's Old Boys (interim)
- 2024: Newell's Old Boys (interim)

Adrián Roberto Coria (born 16 May 1959) is an Argentine football manager, currently the manager of Newell's Old Boys' youth categories.

Coria is recognized as the first manager of Lionel Messi at Newell's before his move to Spain.

== Career ==
After working as manager of Newell's Old Boys' youth sides for more than ten years, Coria joined Gerardo Martino's staff as one of his assistants in 2003, at Cerro Porteño. He also worked alongside Martino at Colón, Libertad, the Paraguay national team (where he was also in charge of the under-20 team), Newell's, Barcelona and the Argentina national team.

On 2 March 2017, Coria was named manager of Paraguayan side Sportivo Luqueño. He left on 10 April, and later started working as Mario Sciacqua's assistant at Patronato, Godoy Cruz and Sarmiento.

Coria returned to Newell's in November 2021, again in charge of the youth sides, along with Gustavo Tognarelli and Ariel Palena. On 29 August 2022, he was named interim manager along with Tognarelli, as Javier Sanguinetti resigned.
