= Baltasar Barcia =

Uruguayan footballer (born 2001)

Personal information
- Full name: Mateo Baltasar Barcia Fernández
- Date of birth: 19 February 2001 (age 25)
- Place of birth: Pando, Uruguay
- Height: 1.82 m (6 ft 0 in)
- Position: Midfielder

Team information
- Current team: Boston River (on loan from Independiente)
- Number: 32

Youth career
- Rentistas

Senior career*
Years	Team	Apps	(Gls)
2021–2022	Rentistas	33	(2)
2023–	Independiente	26	(1)
2024	→ Criciúma (loan)	16	(0)
2025–	→ Boston River (loan)	25	(1)
- * Club domestic league appearances and goals as of 1 October 2025

Mateo Baltasar Barcia Fernández (born 19 February 2001) is a Uruguayan footballer who plays as midfielder for Boston River, on loan from Argentine club Independiente.

== Career ==
=== Rentistas ===
Born in Pando, Barcia was a Rentistas youth graduate. He made his first team – and Uruguayan Primera División – debut on 6 June 2021, starting in a 2–0 home loss to Deportivo Maldonado.

Barcia scored his first professional goal on 5 July 2021, netting the winner in a 1–0 away success over Cerrito. He was regularly used during the 2022 season, but was unable to avoid team relegation.

=== Independiente ===
On 24 January 2023, Barcia signed a four-year contract with Argentine Primera División side Independiente, after the club paid US$ 500,000 for 50% of his economic rights.

== Career statistics ==
As of 24 August 2024

Club	Season	League			Cup		Continental		State league		Total	
Club	Season	Division	Apps	Goals	Apps	Goals	Apps	Goals	Apps	Goals	Apps	Goals
Rentistas	2021	Uruguayan Primera División	17	1	—		0	0	—		17	1
Rentistas	2022	Uruguayan Primera División	16	1	—		—		—		16	1
Rentistas	Total		33	2	—		0	0	—		33	2
Independiente	2023	Argentine Primera División	26	1	1	0	—		—		27	1
Criciúma (loan)	2024	Série A	4	0	1	0	—		12 (Note: Appearance(s) in Campeonato Catarinense)	0	17	0
Career total			63	3	2	0	0	0	12	0	77	3
