= Marcelo Bravo =

Argentine footballer

Personal information
- Full name: Marcelo René Bravo
- Date of birth: 10 January 1985 (age 41)
- Place of birth: Lomas de Zamora, Argentina
- Height: 1.76 m (5 ft 9 in)
- Position: Left winger

Team information
- Current team: Vélez Sarsfield (youth manager)

Youth career
- 1992–2003: Vélez Sarsfield

Senior career*
Years	Team	Apps	(Gls)
2003–2006	Vélez Sarsfield	50	(5)
Total		50	(5)

International career
2005	Argentina U20	5	(0)

Managerial career
- 2016–: Vélez Sarsfield (youth)
- 2023: Vélez Sarsfield (interim)
- 2023: Vélez Sarsfield (interim)
- 2025: Vélez Sarsfield (interim)
- * Club domestic league appearances and goals

Marcelo René Bravo (born 10 January 1985) is an Argentine former football coach and former player who played as a midfielder. He is the current manager of Vélez Sarsfield's youth categories.

Bravo played 50 games with Vélez Sarsfield, being a key member of the 2005 Clausura winning squad, and played for the Argentine U-20 national team before retiring at the age of 21 after discovering that he suffered from a cardiovascular hypertrophy. His illness is similar to the one that cost fellow footballer Antonio Puerta's life in 2007.

== Playing career ==
=== Club ===
Bravo only played at club level for Vélez Sarsfield in the Primera División Argentina. He started his professional career in 2003 and retired in 2006, immediately after the club's doctors discovered his illness. He played 16 games and scored 3 goals in Vélez' 2005 Clausura winning campaign, being a regular on the team's left wing. His last game came during the 2006 Apertura in a 6–0 victory over Gimnasia y Esgrima de La Plata, where he scored one goal.

=== International ===
Bravo was part of the Argentine under-20 squad that came third in the 2005 South American Youth Championship held in Colombia. He was a substitute in a team where, among others, played Lionel Messi.

== Post-playing career ==
Immediately after retiring, Vélez offered Bravo a position in Miguel Ángel Russo's coaching staff. In an interview given in 2006 he stated:

On one side, I know that my time as footballer is in the past, however, on the other hand, I confess that I still maintain minimum hope that science could advance and find a solution. I am only 21 years old and with the speed at which science advances you never know what could happen, for example, in three or four years from now.

— Página/12

He then went on to coach in Vélez's youth divisions.

On 26 February 2023, Bravo and Hernán Manrique were named interim managers of Vélez, after Alexander Medina left.

== Honours ==
- Primera División Argentina (1): 2005 Clausura

== See also ==
- Antonio Puerta
