= Leandro Stillitano =

Argentine footballer and manager

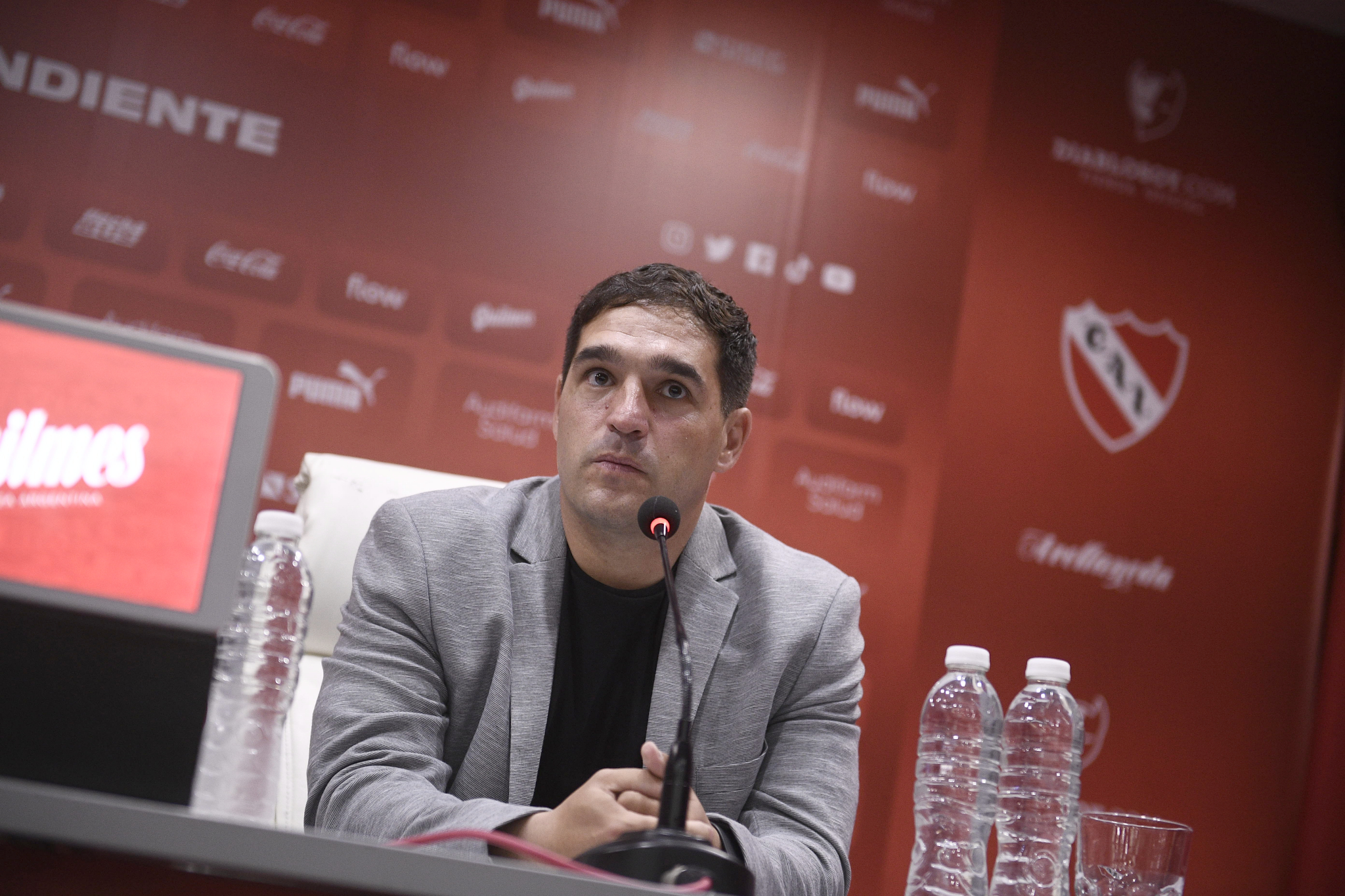
- Stillitano in 2022

Personal information
- Full name: Leandro Gabriel Stillitano
- Date of birth: 6 February 1983 (age 43)
- Place of birth: Avellaneda, Argentina
- Position: Midfielder

Team information
- Current team: Inter Miami (assistant manager)

Senior career*
Years	Team	Apps	(Gls)
2005–2008	Atlético Lugano	79	(0)
2008–2009	Dock Sud	13	(0)
Total		92	(0)

Managerial career
- 2011–2013: San Martín de Burzaco
- 2014: Juventud Unida
- 2015–2016: Defensa y Justicia (assistant)
- 2017–2018: Independiente (assistant)
- 2019–2020: Tijuana (assistant)
- 2020–2022: Colo-Colo (assistant)
- 2023: Independiente
- 2023–2024: Argentina U20 (assistant)
- 2024–: Inter Miami (assistant)
- * Club domestic league appearances and goals

Leandro Gabriel Stillitano (born 6 February 1983) is an Argentine football manager and former player who played mainly as a midfielder. He is currently assistant manager of Major League Soccer club Inter Miami.

== Career ==
Born in Avellaneda, Stillitano played as a senior for Club Atlético Lugano and Sportivo Dock Sud before retiring. He started his managerial career in 2011, being in charge of San Martín de Burzaco.

In 2014, Stillitano was in charge of Juventud Unida for a short period, before joining Ariel Holan's staff at Banfield in January 2015, as an assistant of the youth sides. He subsequently followed Holan to Defensa y Justicia and Independiente, always as his assistant.

In January 2019, Stillitano became the manager of Independiente's reserve side. In November of that year, he joined Gustavo Quinteros' staff at Club Tijuana, as his assistant, and also followed him to Colo-Colo.

On 12 November 2022, Stillitano returned to Independiente, after being appointed manager of the club for the 2023 season. The following 18 March, he left the club on a mutual agreement, and joined Javier Mascherano's staff at the Argentina national under-20 team in the following month.
