= Flabián Londoño =

Colombian footballer

Personal information
- Full name: Flabián Londoño Bedoya
- Date of birth: 9 July 2000 (age 26)
- Place of birth: Ebéjico, Antioquia, Colombia
- Height: 1.82 m (6 ft 0 in)
- Position: Forward

Team information
- Current team: Deportivo La Guaira
- Number: 36

Youth career
- –2018: Deportivo La Mazzia
- 2018-2021: River Plate

Senior career*
Years	Team	Apps	(Gls)
2022–24	River Plate	0	(0)
2023	→ Arsenal de Sarandí (loan)	29	(2)
2024	→ Tigre (loan)	13	(0)
2024	→ Patriotas	14	(4)
2025	Carabobo	38	(10)
2026–	Deportivo La Guaira	6	(3)
- * Club domestic league appearances and goals as of 10 March 2026

Flabián Londoño Bedoya (born 9 July 2000) is a Colombian professional footballer who plays as a striker for Venezuelan club Deportivo La Guaira.

== Career ==
=== River Plate ===
Born in Ebéjico, Antioquia. He began playing from the age of 14 for Deportivo La Mazzia in Medellín, before being scouted by River Plate’s Gustavo Fermani and subsequently joining River Plate in Argentina in 2018. His progress was hampered by a ligament injury in 2019. However, after recovering he had goal scoring success for the River Plate reserve team. In May 2021 he signed a new three-and-a-half-year professional contract with River Plate.

==== Arsenal de Sarandi (loan) ====
In January 2023 he joined Arsenal de Sarandi on year long loan. He scored his first professional goal on April 22, 2023 in the Argentine Primera División against Unión de Santa Fe, a 95th minute winner in a 2-1 victory, however he received a second booking for his subsequent goal celebration and was sent off.

==== Tigre (loan) ====
In January 2024, he joined Tigre on loan however the contract was terminated in July 2024 due to a lack of minutes and without him having scored a goal for the club.

=== Patriotas Boyacá ===
In the second half of 2024, he joined Colombian side Patriotas Boyacá on a free transfer. He scored his first league goal for the club on 19 August 2024 in a 3-1 win against Once Caldas.

=== Carabobo ===
On 12 January 2025, Londoño joined Venezuelan club Carabobo FC, on a free transfer.

== Career statistics ==
As of 12 December 2025

Appearances and goals by club, season and competition
Club	Season	League			Cup		Continental		Total	
Club	Season	Division	Apps	Goals	Apps	Goals	Apps	Goals	Apps	Goals
Arsenal (loan)	2023	Argentine Primera División	29	2	1	0	—		30	2
Tigre (loan)	2024	Argentine Primera División	13	0	0	0	—		13	0
Patriotas	2024	Categoría Primera A	14	4	0	0	—		14	4
Carabobo	2025	Venezuelan Primera División	38	10	2	3	6	0	46	13
Career total			94	16	3	3	6	0	103	19

== Personal life ==
He is the cousin of the professional footballer Gerardo Bedoya.
