= Dany Edjo'o =

Cameroonian footballer

Dany Edjo'o (born 18 December 2001) is a Cameroonian footballer who plays as an attacker for Defensores de Belgrano.

== Career ==
Edjo'o started his career with Argentine top flight side Banfield. Before the 2021 season, Edjo'o was sent on loan to Cañuelas in the Argentine third tier, where he made 12 league appearances and scored 1 goal.

Before the 2023 season, he signed for Argentine second-tier club Defensores de Belgrano.
