= Mariano Herrón =

Argentine footballer and coach

Mariano Andrés Herrón
Personal information
- Full name: Mariano Andrés Herrón Valera
- Date of birth: 24 February 1978 (age 48)
- Place of birth: Buenos Aires, Argentina
- Height: 1.75 m (5 ft 9 in)
- Position: Defensive midfielder

Team information
- Current team: Boca Juniors (assistant)

Senior career*
| Years | Team | Apps | (Gls) |
| 1998–2002 | Argentinos Juniors | 85 | (0) |
| 2000 | → Montpellier (loan) | 5 | (0) |
| 2002–2003 | San Lorenzo | 24 | (0) |
| 2003–2004 | Rosario Central | 19 | (0) |
| 2004–2005 | UE Lleida | 13 | (0) |
| 2005–2010 | Independiente | 83 | (1) |
| 2009 | → Deportivo Cali (loan) | 28 | (1) |
| 2010–2013 | Aldosivi | 48 | (0) |

Managerial career
- Independiente (reserves)
- 2017–2019: Tigre (assistant)
- 2020–: Boca Juniors (assistant)
- 2023: Boca Juniors (interim)
- 2023: Boca Juniors (interim)
- 2024: Boca Juniors (interim)
- 2025: Boca Juniors (interim)
- * Club domestic league appearances and goals

Mariano Andrés Herrón Valera (born 24 February 1978 in Buenos Aires) is an Argentine football manager and former player who played as a defensive midfielder. He is the current assistant manager of Boca Juniors.

== Career ==
Herrón began his playing career with Argentinos Juniors on 10 August 1998 in a 2–2 draw with Gimnasia y Esgrima de Jujuy. In 2000, he had a loan spell with French side Montpellier but returned to play for Argentinos until 2002.

After single seasons with San Lorenzo and Rosario Central he joined Spanish side UE Lleida in 2004. In 2005, he returned again to Argentina to play for Independiente. He spent the whole of 2009 on loan to Deportivo Cali of Colombia.

In July 2010, Herrón moved to the second division to play for Aldosivi.

== Coaching career ==
After retiring, Herrón became a part of Bichi Borghi's coaching staff at Argentinos Juniors. On 18 December 2017, Herrón was appointed as the assistant coach of Cristian Raúl Ledesma at Club Atlético Tigre. He left on 11 February 2019 alongside manager Mariano Echeverría.

In January 2020, he was appointed assistant coach to his former coach Miguel Ángel Russo at Boca Juniors. In 2023, he was interim manager of Boca Juniors after the dismissal of Hugo Ibarra.

== Honours ==
San Lorenzo

- Copa Sudamericana: 2002
