= Cristian Vella =

Argentine footballer

Vella, Cristian
Personal information
- Full name: Vella, Cristian Daniel
- Date of birth: March 6, 1978 (age 48)
- Place of birth: Rosario, Santa Fe, Argentina
- Position: Centre back

Team information
- Current team: Sportivo Belgrano

Youth career
- Velez Sarsfield

Senior career*
Years	Team	Apps	(Gls)
1999–2002	Vélez Sársfield		
2002	Argentino de Rosario		
2003–2004	Central Córdoba de Rosario		
2004–2005	Defensores de Belgrano		
2005–2006	Central Córdoba de Rosario		
2006–2008	Ben Hur		
2008–2012	All Boys		
2012–2013	Atlético de Rafaela		
2013–	Sportivo Belgrano	1	(0)
- * Club domestic league appearances and goals as of 6 July 2012 (UTC)

Cristian Vella (born March 6, 1978, in Rosario, Santa Fe, Argentina) is an Argentine footballer currently playing for Sportivo Belgrano of the Primera B Nacional Argentina.
