= Diego Villar =

Argentine footballer

Personal information
- Full name: Diego Nicolás Villar
- Date of birth: 24 April 1981 (age 45)
- Place of birth: Mar del Plata, Argentina
- Height: 1.75 m (5 ft 9 in)
- Position: Winger

Team information
- Current team: Aldosivi (youth) (coach)

Youth career
- Independiente MdP
- Newell's Old Boys

Senior career*
Years	Team	Apps	(Gls)
2001–2004	Newell's Old Boys	34	(2)
2005	Santiago Wanderers	6	(0)
2005–2007	Godoy Cruz	64	(10)
2007	Arsenal de Sarandí	18	(1)
2008–2010	Gimnasia LP	46	(4)
2010–2012	Godoy Cruz	46	(7)
2012–2014	Racing Club	61	(5)
2014	→ Defensa y Justicia (loan)	3	(0)
2015–2017	Unión Santa Fe	55	(1)
2017–2018	Aldosivi	18	(1)
2019	Independiente MdP	–	(–)

Managerial career
- 2021–: Aldosivi (youth)
- 2022: Aldosivi (interim)
- * Club domestic league appearances and goals

Diego Nicolás Villar (born 24 April 1981) is an Argentine football manager and former player who played as a winger. He is a current youth coach of Aldosivi.

== Career ==
Villar started his professional playing career with Newell's Old Boys in 2001, in 2005 he joined Chilean side Santiago Wanderers but returned to Argentina later that year to join 2nd division team Godoy Cruz. In 2006, he was part of the Godoy Cruz team to win promotion to the Argentine Primera. Despite his contribution of 7 goals Godoy Cruz were relegated at the end of the 2006-2007 season after losing their playoff with Huracán.

In 2007 Villar joined Arsenal de Sarandí, but was allowed to leave in February 2008 to join Gimnasia de La Plata. He returned to Godoy Cruz for the 2010–11 Argentine Primera División season.

In July 2012 he is transferred to Racing Club signing a 3-year contract. He was a key figure in the team that won the 2014 First Division championship.

In 2017, Following three seasons playing for Defensa y Justicia and Uniòn de Santa Fe, Villar signed for his home-town club Aldosivi. He retired in 2018, after Aldosivi's promotion to Primera Divisiòn.

== Personal life ==
As of 2020 he owned a sweets & confectionery company in his native city of Mar del Plata.

== Honours ==
Arsenal de Sarandí

- Copa Sudamericana: 2007

Racing Club

- Argentine Primera División: 2014
