= Marcelo Saralegui =

Uruguayan footballer (born 1971)

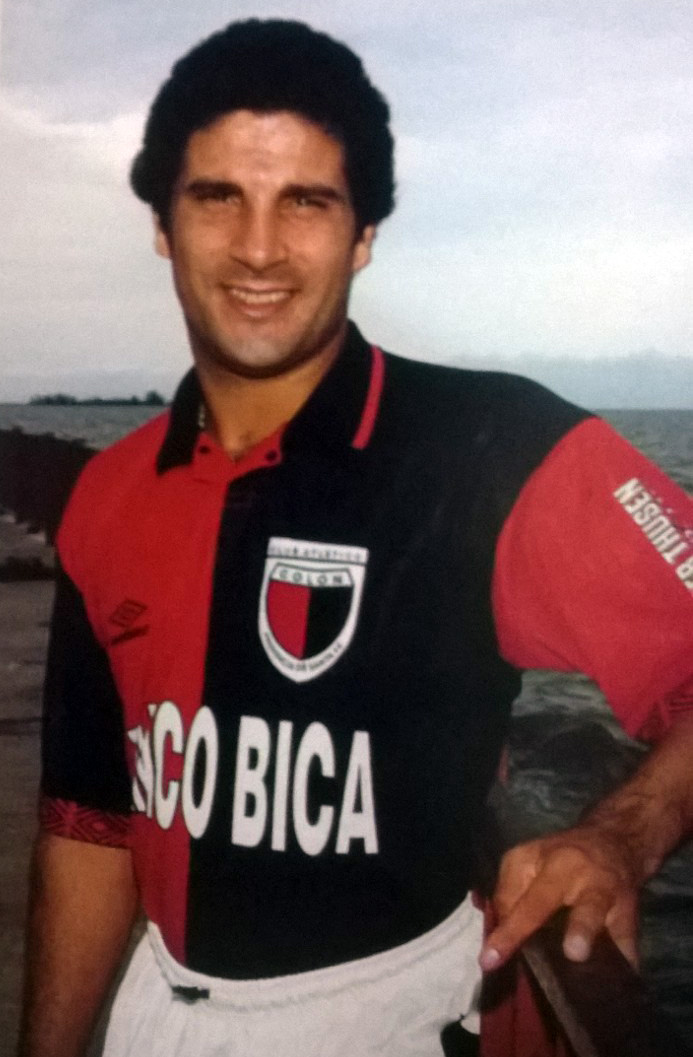
- Saralegui with Colón in 1997

Personal information
- Full name: Marcelo Saralegui Arregín
- Date of birth: 18 May 1971 (age 55)
- Place of birth: Montevideo, Uruguay
- Height: 1.72 m (5 ft 8 in)
- Position: Midfielder

Youth career
- 1984–1988: Nacional

Senior career*
Years	Team	Apps	(Gls)
1989–1992	Nacional	37	(4)
1990	Atlético Madrileño	3	(0)
1992–1994	Torino	2	(0)
1994–1995	Racing Club	33	(5)
1995–1999	Colón	105	(29)
1999	Independiente	14	(1)
2000	Defensor Sporting	5	(0)
2000–2001	Racing Club	12	(1)
2001–2002	Nacional	12	(2)
2002–2003	Fénix	16	(?)
2004	Uruguay Montevideo	?	(?)

International career
1992–1997	Uruguay	33	(6)

Managerial career
- 2004–2006: Uruguay Montevideo
- 2006–2007: Cerrito
- 2010: Cerrito
- 2014: Rampla Juniors
- 2016: Colegiales
- 2022–2023: Colón
Medal record
Representing Uruguay
Copa América
Winner	1995 Uruguay
- * Club domestic league appearances and goals

Marcelo Saralegui Arregín (born 18 May 1971) is a Uruguayan football manager and former player who played as a midfielder.

Saralegui played 33 times for the Uruguay national team between 1992 and 1997. In 1995 he was part of the Uruguay squad that won the Copa América.

== Playing career ==
=== Club ===
Saralegui started his professional playing career in 1989 with Nacional, in 1992 he played a part in the clubs championship winning season. Later that year he joined Torino of Italy but he did not have much success there and returned to South America to play in Argentina.

His first club in Argentina was Racing Club de Avellaneda where he played one season before joining Colón de Santa Fe. He played over 100 games for Colón between 1995 and 1999.

In 1999, he joined Independiente, fierce rivals of Racing Club. In 2000, he rejoined Racing Club.

In 2001, he returned to Uruguay to play for Nacional again, and in 2001 he won his second Uruguayan championship. In the final years of his career he played for Fénix and Uruguay Montevideo.

=== International ===
He made his debut for Uruguay in a friendly match against Australia (2-0 win) on June 21, 1992, in the Estadio Centenario in Montevideo under coach Luis Alberto Cubilla.

== Career statistics ==
=== International ===
Appearances and goals by national team and year
National team	Year	Apps	Goals
Uruguay	1992	6	0
Uruguay	1993	6	2
Uruguay	1994	0	0
Uruguay	1995	7	1
Uruguay	1996	6	0
Uruguay	1997	8	3
Total		33	6

== Honours ==
Season	Team	Title
1992	Nacional	Primera División Uruguaya
1995	Uruguay	Copa América
2001	Nacional	Primera División Uruguaya
