= Iván Cazal =

Paraguayan footballer (born 1999)

Personal information
- Full name: Javier Iván Cazal Báez
- Date of birth: 22 March 1999 (age 27)
- Place of birth: General Elizardo Aquino, Paraguay
- Height: 1.75 m (5 ft 9 in)
- Positions: Right midfielder; right-back

Team information
- Current team: 13 de Junio

Youth career
- Teniente Turbo
- 2015: Deportivo Santaní
- 8 De Diciembre

Senior career*
Years	Team	Apps	(Gls)
- Teniente Turbo
2018–2019	Deportivo Santaní	71	(5)
2020–2023	Sol de América	56	(6)
2022	→ Lanús (loan)	5	(0)
2023	→ Guaireña (loan)	7	(0)
2024	Deportivo Santaní	7	(0)
2025	Atlético Tembetary		
2025–	13 de Junio		
- * Club domestic league appearances and goals as of 19:20, 25 April 2024 (UTC)

Javier Iván Cazal Báez (born 22 March 1999) is a Paraguayan professional footballer who plays as a right midfielder or right-back for 13 de Junio.

== Career ==
=== Early career ===
Cazal was raised in one of the poorest departments of Paraguay, San Pedro, in a little town called General Elizardo Aquino, 200 kilometers from the capital. Cazal started playing football at Club Teniente Turbo in Gral. Aquino, a local club placed next to his house, where he played with the seniors at the age of 14.

In 2015 he went to Deportivo Santaní training sessions, which that year achieved the historic promotion to the Paraguayan Primera División. Later, he had a spell at Club 8 De Diciembre San Pedro. Cazal was close to leaving football in 2017 to become a bricklayer because his family needed money. However, his father convinced him to stay and shortly after, Pedro Sarabia spotted him at Club 8 De Diciembre and offered him to join Deportivo Santaní again. Cazal accepted and returned to Santaní.

=== Deportivo Santaní ===
Soon after arriving, on 4 February 2018, Cazal got his professional debut against Club 3 de Febrero in the Paraguayan Primera División. His debut in the first division caused a furore, attracted the attention of clubs and he was even called up to the Paraguayan U-20 team and was in the U-20 micro circle for the Pre-Olympic Games.

Cazal quickly became a regular starter for Santaní and played 32 games and scored three goals for the team in the 2018 season, helping them to qualify for the 2019 Copa Sudamericana.

Whilst at Deportivo Santani, he credited teammate Eduardo Aranda for teaching and advising him.

In the 2019 season, Cazal played 43 games. However, he left the club at the end of that season, when Santaní was relegated to the Paraguayan División Intermedia.

=== Sol de América ===
At the end of December 2019 it was confirmed, that Cazal would join fellow league club Club Sol de América for the 2020 season. Cazal made his debut on 18 January 2020 against River Plate. He played a total of 24 game for the club in the 2019 season.

In January 2022, Cazal was offered to Primera División Argentina team San Lorenzo de Almagro by his agent Daniel Campo. In July 2022, he finally completed a move to Argentine football, as he signed a loan deal with Lanús until the end of 2023 with a purchase option. In June 2023, he moved to Guaireña on a one-year loan.

=== Return to Deportivo Santaní ===
In February 2024, it was confirmed that Cazal had re-joined his former club, Deportivo Santaní.

=== Atlético Tembetary ===
In December 2024, ahead of the 2025 season, Cazal signed with Atlético Tembetary. He left the club again short time after.
