= Alejandro Milano =

Argentine footballer and manager

Personal information
- Full name: Alejandro Carlos Milano
- Date of birth: 10 April 1975 (age 51)
- Place of birth: Buenos Aires, Argentina
- Height: 1.79 m (5 ft 10 in)
- Position: Midfielder

Youth career
- Almagro

Senior career*
| Years | Team | Apps | (Gls) |
| 1995–2002 | Almagro | 64 | (3) |
| 2002–2006 | Barracas Central | 89 | (10) |
| 2006–2007 | Sacachispas | 19 | (1) |

Managerial career
- 2008–2020: Barracas Central (reserves)
- 2008: Barracas Central (interim)
- 2017: Barracas Central (interim)
- 2020–2021: Barracas Central
- 2022–2023: Barracas Central
- * Club domestic league appearances and goals

Alejandro Carlos Milano (born 10 April 1975) is an Argentine football manager and former player who played as a midfielder.

== Playing career ==
Born in Buenos Aires, Milano began his career with Almagro, being promoted to the first team in 1995. In 2002, he moved to Barracas Central.

In 2006, Milano left Barracas and joined Sacachispas. He retired in the following year, aged 32.

== Managerial career ==
In 2008, Milano was an interim manager of Barracas Central in the Primera C Metropolitana. In April 2017, he was again named interim after Fabián Nardozza left, being in charge until November when Alejandro Nanía took over.

On 3 March 2020, Milano was appointed as the manager of Barracas Central, after Cristián Aldirico resigned. He left the role the following 26 January, being named sporting director of the first team while Rodolfo de Paoli was named manager.

On 15 August 2022, Milano returned to managerial duties, after being named in charge of Barracas along with de Paoli. The following 11 April, the duo left on a mutual agreement.
