= Harrinson Mancilla =

Colombian footballer (born 1991)

Personal information
- Full name: Harrinson Mancilla Mulato
- Date of birth: 22 December 1991 (age 34)
- Place of birth: Puerto Tejada, Colombia
- Height: 1.74 m (5 ft 9 in)
- Position: Midfielder

Team information
- Current team: Águilas Doradas
- Number: 27

Senior career*
Years	Team	Apps	(Gls)
2012–2017	Tigres	154	(1)
2018–2020	Cúcuta Deportivo	71	(0)
2020–2023	Gimnasia LP	41	(0)
2022–2023	→ Sarmiento (loan)	24	(1)
2024	Central Córdoba SdE	2	(0)
2024–	Águilas Doradas	34	(0)
- * Club domestic league appearances and goals as of 12 December 2025

Harrinson Mancilla Mulato (born 22 December 1991) is a Colombian professional footballer who plays as a midfielder for Águilas Doradas.

== Club career ==
Mancilla made his professional debut with Tigres F.C. in a 0-0 Categoría Primera A tie with Once Caldas on 5 February 2017. A mainstay at Tigres from 2012 to 2017, Mancilla joined Cúcuta Deportivo in 2018.

In January 2020, he signed with Gimnasia y Esgrima in Argentina. At the end of January 2022, Mancilla moved to fellow league club Sarmiento on a one-year loan with a purchase option.

== Honours ==
Cúcuta Deportivo

- Categoría Primera B: 2018
