= Julio Vaccari =

Argentine football manager

Personal information
- Full name: Julio César Vaccari
- Date of birth: 9 July 1980 (age 46)
- Place of birth: Buenos Aires, Argentina
- Height: 1.86 m (6 ft 1 in)

Team information
- Current team: Defensa y Justicia (manager)

Managerial career
- Years: Team
- Atlético Paz
- Círculo General Belgrano
- 2015: Godoy Cruz (assistant)
- 2016–2017: Argentinos Juniors (assistant)
- 2018–2020: Vélez Sarsfield (assistant)
- 2021–2022: Vélez Sarsfield (reserves)
- 2022: Vélez Sarsfield (interim)
- 2022–2024: Defensa y Justicia
- 2024–2025: Independiente
- 2026–: Defensa y Justicia

Julio César Vaccari (born 9 July 1980) is an Argentine football manager, currently in charge of Defensa y Justicia.

== Career ==
Vaccari was a Physical Education graduate at the Universidad del Salvador, and was in charge of lowly sides Atlético Paz and Círculo General Belgrano before joining Marcelo Bielsa's staff at Athletic Bilbao, as a video analyst. He followed Bielsa to Olympique de Marseille under the same role, before joining Gabriel Heinze's staff at Godoy Cruz in 2015, now as an assistant.

Vaccari continued to work as Heinze's assistant at Argentinos Juniors and Vélez Sarsfield. On 30 December 2020, he returned to the latter club after being named manager of the reserve team.

On 24 March 2022, Vaccari was named interim manager of Vélez, after Mauricio Pellegrino resigned. On 5 April, he was confirmed as the permanent first team manager.

On 13 September 2022, Vaccari replaced Sebastián Beccacece at the helm of Defensa y Justicia. He resigned from the club on 14 May 2024, after their elimination from the 2024 Copa Sudamericana.

On 13 June 2024, Vaccari took over Independiente also in the top tier. On 13 September of the following year, he resigned.

On 24 May 2026, Vaccari returned to Defensa, replacing Mariano Soso.

== Managerial statistics ==
As of 24 October 2026

Managerial record by team and tenure
Team	Nat	From	To	Record							
Team	Nat	From	To	G	W	D	L	GF	GA	GD	Win %
Vélez Sarsfield	(Argentina)	24 March 2022	28 May 2022	13	5	5	3	22	18	+4	38.46
Defensa y Justicia	(Argentina)	13 September 2022	14 May 2024	88	38	28	22	112	90	+22	43.18
Independiente	(Argentina)	13 June 2024	13 September 2025	61	25	20	16	74	44	+30	40.98
Defensa y Justicia	(Argentina)	24 May 2026	present	15	8	3	4	21	17	+4	53.33
Total				177	76	56	45	229	169	+60	42.94

== Honours ==
Defensa y Justicia

- Copa Argentina runner-up: 2023
