= Enzo Larrosa =

Uruguayan football player (born 2001)

Personal information
- Full name: Enzo Miguel Larrosa Martínez
- Date of birth: 21 April 2001 (age 25)
- Place of birth: Progreso, Uruguay
- Height: 1.85 m (6 ft 1 in)
- Position: Forward

Team information
- Current team: Independiente Medellín
- Number: 9

Youth career
- Defensor Sporting
- Boston River

Senior career*
Years	Team	Apps	(Gls)
2020–2022	Boston River	38	(5)
2022–2024	Godoy Cruz	40	(3)
2024–2025	Boston River	8	(0)
2024	→ Montevideo City Torque (loan)	10	(3)
2025	→ Cerro (loan)	29	(9)
2026–	Independiente Medellín	9	(1)
- * Club domestic league appearances and goals as of 25 May 2025

Enzo Miguel Larrosa Martínez (born 21 April 2001) is a Uruguayan professional footballer who plays as a forward for Independiente Medellín.

== Club career ==
Larrosa is a youth academy graduate of Boston River. He made his professional debut for the club on 11 November 2020 in a goalless draw against Danubio.

== International career ==
Larrosa is a former Uruguay youth international.

== Career statistics ==
=== Club ===
As of match played 6 February 2022

Appearances and goals by club, season and competition
Club	Season	League			Cup		Continental		Total	
Club	Season	Division	Apps	Goals	Apps	Goals	Apps	Goals	Apps	Goals
Boston River	2020	Uruguayan Primera División	16	2	—		—		16	2
Boston River	2021	Uruguayan Primera División	17	3	–		—		17	3
Boston River	2022	Uruguayan Primera División	1	0	–		—		1	0
Career total			34	5	0	0	0	0	34	5
