= Club Atlético Colón =

Argentine sports club

Colón
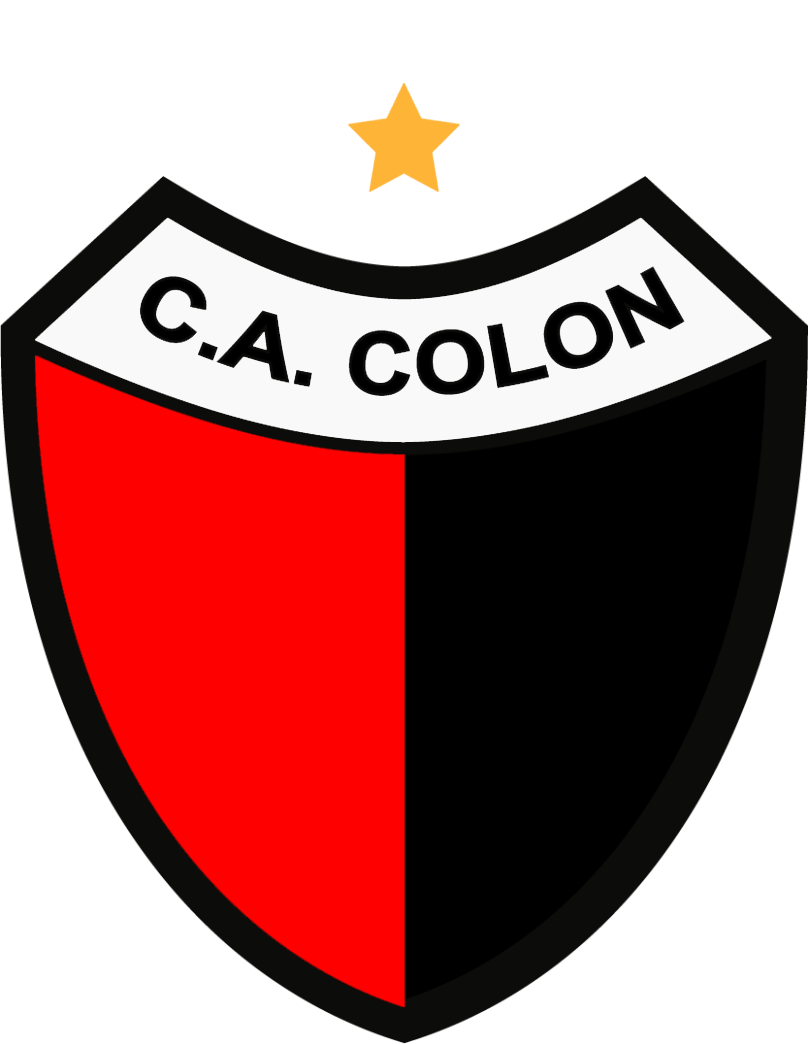
- Full name: Club Atlético Colón
- Nicknames: Sabalero (Tarpon Fisher); Sabalé (Tarpon); Negro (Black); Raza (Race)
- Founded: May 5, 1905; 121 years ago
- Ground: Estadio B.G. Estanislao López, (Cementerio de los Elefantes), Santa Fe
- Capacity: 40,000
- Chairman: Víctor Godano
- Manager: Ezequiel Medrán
- League: Primera Nacional
- 2025: Primera Nacional Zone B, 16th of 18
- Website: clubcolon.com.ar
Home colours	Away colours	Third colours

Club Atlético Colón (Spanish pronunciation: [ˈkluβ aˈtletiko koˈlon]), commonly referred to as Colón de Santa Fe [koˈlon de santa ˈfe], is a sports club from Santa Fe, Argentina. The football team plays in the second Division of the Argentine football league system, the Primera Nacional.

It was born as a football club, which today still remains its main activity. It also has other disciplines like basketball, volleyball, hockey, women's football, boxing, futsal and swimming.

The stadium, named Estadio Brigadier General Estanislao López in honor of an Argentinian leader governor of Provincia de Santa Fe between 1818 and 1838, has a capacity for 40000 people. It is nicknamed «El Cementerio de los Elefantes» (Elephant Graveyard).

The club joined the Argentine Football Association in 1948 and obtained its first championship in 1965, ascending to the First Division.

The club's most important accomplishment is its First Division Argentine Primera División championship in 2021. It has also come runner up in the international Copa Sudamericana 2019, and won the Second Division's "Copa de Honor" trophy in 1950. Finally, as a personal milestone, it has a victory in 1964 against Pelé's Santos FC.

== History ==
The club was founded on 5 May 1905, as "Colón Foot-ball Club" by a group of friends that were enthusiastic about football. It was named after Cristóbal Colón (Christopher Columbus), whose biography was being studied by one of the boys at the time.

In 1965 Colon won the Primera B title.

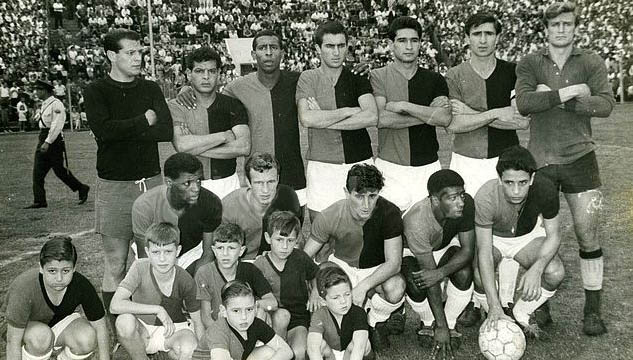
The 1965 team that won the Primera B title promoting to Primera División

The first game played by Colón in Primera was v Chacarita Juniors on 6 May 1966. After the first season in the top level Colón finished 16th, but the following year the structure of Argentine football was changed so as there were two championships each season, the Metropolitano and the Nacional, with entrance to the latter originally only available to the higher placed Metropolitano teams. Colon did not qualify for the Nacional until 1968, although the squad did then managed a 6th-place finish.

Colón finished 2nd in their group in the 1972 Nacional.

In 1975 the team made a good campaign in the Metropolitano, finishing in 6th place. This got better two years later, when Colón finished 5th in the Metropolitano, although the team then struggled in the Nacional. In 1978 Colón reached the knockout stages of the Nacional but was beaten in the quarter-finals by Independiente.

Colon was relegated from the Metropolitana in 1981 having won only 6 games that season. It was to take 14 years for Colón to return to the top division (for the 1995–96 season). During the intervening period the team came close to promotion on a number of occasions, and lost Promotion Play-off games in 1988–89 to arch-rivals Union 3–0 on aggregate, and in 1992–93 Colón lost the championship play-off, being defeated by Banfield and then failed to qualify through the secondary play-offs.

After a few mid-table finishes Colón was placed 2nd in the 1997 Clausura tournament, which is team's highest placed finish to date. As River Plate won both titles that season, a play-off was required between the two runners-up. In December 1997 Colón defeated Independiente 1–0 to qualify for the Copa Libertadores 1998. In the 2016–17 season, Colón drew an average home league attendance of 25,000.

The institution's greatest sporting achievement was achieved by becoming champion of the Professional League Cup 2021.

=== International competitions ===
Colon made their South American debut in the Copa CONMEBOL 1997 against Universidad de Chile. They subsequently reached the semi-finals where they lost to fellow Argentine side Lanús.

They made their debut in South America's most prestigious club tournament (Copa Libertadores) the following season. Their first game in the group stage was a 1–2 home defeat to River Plate, although they were still to qualify for the knockout stages. After beating Olimpia on penalties they were again drawn to play River Plate, but were defeated 5–2 on aggregate in the quarter-final.

In 2003, they qualified for their 3rd different continental competition (Copa Sudamericana), and they defeated Vélez Sársfield before losing to Boca Juniors.

== Stadium ==
The club's current stadium is the Estadio Brigadier General Estanislao López, which holds 40,000 spectators. The ground was inaugurated in 1946, and received a major renovation starting in 2002.

== Players ==
=== Current squad ===
As of 21 June 2025

Note: Flags indicate national team as defined under FIFA eligibility rules; some limited exceptions apply. Players may hold more than one non-FIFA nationality.

No.	Pos.	Nation	Player
1	GK	ARG	Marcos Díaz
2	DF	ARG	Guillermo Ortíz
3	DF	ARG	Facundo Castet
4	DF	ARG	Gonzalo Bettini
5	MF	ARG	Zahir Yunis
6	DF	ARG	Brian Negro
7	MF	ARG	Nicolás Talpone
8	MF	ARG	Federico Jourdan
9	FW	ARG	Genaro Rossi
10	MF	ARG	Christian Bernardi
11	MF	ARG	Ignacio Lago
12	GK	ARG	Tomás Giménez
13	MF	ARG	Agustín Giménez
14	DF	ARG	Facundo Sánchez
15	DF	ARG	Oscar Garrido
16	MF	ARG	Facundo Taborda
17	FW	PAR	Jorge Sanguina
18	MF	USA	Joel Soñora

No.	Pos.	Nation	Player
19	DF	ARG	Lucas Picech
20	DF	ARG	Conrado Ibarra
21	FW	ARG	José Barreto
22	FW	ARG	Matías Córdoba
23	DF	ARG	Iván Barbona
24	DF	ARG	Nicolás Thaller
25	MF	ARG	Lautaro Laborie
26	GK	ARG	Tomás Paredes
27	DF	ARG	Zahir Ibarra
28	MF	ARG	Alan Forneris
29	DF	ARG	Gonzalo Soto
30	MF	ARG	Tomás Gallay
31	FW	ARG	Iván Ojeda
32	FW	ARG	Leandro Zabala
33	FW	ARG	Facundo Castro
35	DF	ARG	Nicolás Fernández
43	FW	ARG	Franco Déboli
44	FW	ARG	Alex Aranda

==== Out on loan ====
Note: Flags indicate national team as defined under FIFA eligibility rules; some limited exceptions apply. Players may hold more than one non-FIFA nationality.

No.	Pos.	Nation	Player

== Managers ==
- (Argentina) Antonio Mohamed (2008–10)
- (Argentina) Fernando Gamboa (2010–11)
- (Argentina) Mario Sciaqua (2011–12)
- (Argentina) Roberto Sensini (2012–13)
- (Argentina) Rubén Forestello (2013)
- (Argentina) Diego Osella (2014)
- (Argentina) Reinaldo Merlo (2014-15)
- (Argentina) Javier López (2015)
- (Argentina) Dario Franco (2015-16)
- (Argentina) Ricardo Johansen (2016)
- (Uruguay) Paolo Montero (2016)
- (Argentina) Eduardo Domínguez (2017-18)
- (Argentina) Esteban Fuertes (Interim) (2018)
- (Uruguay) Julio Comesaña (2019)
- (Argentina) Marcelo Goux (Interim) (2019)
- (Argentina) Pablo Lavallen (2019)
- (Argentina) Diego Osella (2020)
- (Argentina) Eduardo Domínguez (2020-21)
- (Argentina) Julio César Falcioni (2022)
- (Argentina) Adrián Marini (Interim) (2022)
- (Argentina) Sergio Rondina (2022)
- (Argentina) Adrián Marini (Interim) (2022)
- (Uruguay) Marcelo Saralegui (2022-2023)
- (Argentina) Néstor Gorosito (2023)
- (Argentina) Israel Damonte (2023)
- (Argentina) Iván Delfino (2024)
- (Argentina) Rodolfo de Paoli (2024)
- (Argentina) Martín Minella (Interim) (2024)
- (Argentina) Diego Osella (2024)
- (Argentina) Ariel Pereyra (2025)
- (Argentina) Andrés Yllana (2025)
- (Argentina) Martín Minella (Interim) (2025)

== Honours ==
=== Senior titles ===
Keys

- Record
- ^{(s)} Shared record

Type	Competition	Titles	Winning years
National (Cups)	Copa de la Liga Profesional	1	2021

=== Other titles ===
Titles won in lower divisions:

- Primera División B (1): 1965

=== Regional ===
- Liga Santafesina de Football (7): 1913, 1914, 1916, 1918, 1923, 1924, 1925
- Federación Santafesina de Football (3): 1922, 1929, 1930
- Liga Santafesina de Fútbol (5): 1937, 1943, 1945, 1946, 1947
- Torneo Preparación de la Liga Santafesina de Fútbol (1): 1936

=== Friendly ===
- Torneo de Honor (Note: Tournament organized by the Association in 1950, after the Primera B regular season finished. The tournament was contested by all the teams taking part of the division by then. The trophy was named "Juan Domingo Perón") (1): 1950
