= Jean Rosso =

Uruguayan footballer (born 1997)

Personal information
- Full name: Jean Pierre Rosso Génova
- Date of birth: 7 April 1997 (age 29)
- Place of birth: Montevideo, Uruguay
- Height: 1.79 m (5 ft 10 in)
- Position: Right-back

Team information
- Current team: Liverpool Montevideo
- Number: 17

Youth career
- Liverpool Montevideo

Senior career*
Years	Team	Apps	(Gls)
2017–2021	Liverpool Montevideo	69	(1)
2022–2023	Sarmiento	42	(0)
2024–	Liverpool Montevideo	10	(2)
- * Club domestic league appearances and goals as of 20 May 2024

Jean Pierre Rosso Génova (born 7 April 1997) is a Uruguayan professional footballer who plays as a right-back for Liverpool Montevideo.

== Career statistics ==
As of 17 February 2021

Club	Season	League			Cup		Continental		Other		Total	
Club	Season	Division	Apps	Goals	Apps	Goals	Apps	Goals	Apps	Goals	Apps	Goals
Liverpool Montevideo	2017	Primera División	1	0	–		0	0	–		1	0
Liverpool Montevideo	2018	Primera División	14	0	–		–		–		14	0
Liverpool Montevideo	2019	Primera División	28	0	–		2 (Note: Appearances in Copa Sudamericana.)	0	0	0	30	0
Liverpool Montevideo	2020	Primera División	17	0	–		0	0	0	0	17	0
Career total			60	0	0	0	2	0	0	0	62	0

== Honours ==
Liverpool Montevideo

- Supercopa Uruguaya: 2024
