= Claudio Cabrera =

Argentine footballer

Personal information
- Full name: Claudio Martín Cabrera
- Date of birth: 20 November 1963 (age 62)
- Place of birth: Buenos Aires, Argentina
- Height: 1.91 m (6 ft 3 in)
- Position: Midfielder

Team information
- Current team: Huracán (reserve manager)

Youth career
- River Plate

Senior career*
Years	Team	Apps	(Gls)
1982–1983	River Plate	24	(1)
1984–1986	Huracán	59	(7)
1987–1990	Vélez Sarsfield	75	(4)
1990–1991	Argentinos Juniors	24	(3)
1991–1992	Boca Juniors	7	(0)
- Almagro
1996–1997	Arsenal de Sarandí	2	(0)

International career
1988–1989	Argentina	5	(0)

Managerial career
- 2022–: Huracán (reserves)
- 2022: Huracán (interim)
- 2023: Huracán (interim)
- * Club domestic league appearances and goals

Claudio Martín Cabrera (born 20 November 1963) is an Argentine football coach and former player who played as a midfielder. He is the current manager of Huracán's reserve side.

== Playing career ==
A River Plate youth graduate, Cabrera impressed during his spell at Huracán, and subsequently represented Vélez Sarsfield, Argentinos Juniors and Boca Juniors before being marred by knee injuries. He subsequently played for Almagro and retired with Arsenal de Sarandí.

At international level, Cabrera competed in the men's tournament at the 1988 Summer Olympics, and also played five times for the Argentina national team between 1988 and 1989.

== Coaching career ==
In January 2022, Cabrera became a manager of Huracán's reserve side. On 16 May of that year, he became an interim manager of the first team after Frank Darío Kudelka resigned.
