= Luciano Bocco =

Mexican footballer (born 2000)

Personal information
- Full name: Luciano Lionel Bocco Cutro
- Date of birth: 27 October 2000 (age 26)
- Place of birth: Mexico City, Mexico
- Height: 1.79 m (5 ft 10 in)
- Position: Defender

Team information
- Current team: Jaiba Brava
- Number: 2

Youth career
- –2020: Cruz Azul

Senior career*
Years	Team	Apps	(Gls)
2020–2021	Cancún	17	(0)
2022–2023	Central Córdoba (SdE)	0	(0)
2023–2025	Jaiba Brava	35	(3)
2025	FC Rànger's	11	(1)
2026–	Jaiba Brava	8	(0)
- * Club domestic league appearances and goals as of 16 September 2026

Luciano Lionel Bocco Cutro (born 27 October 2000) is a Mexican footballer who plays as a defender for Liga de Expansión MX club Jaiba Brava.

== Early life ==
Bocco was born to Argentine parents in Mexico as his father, former footballer Pablo Bocco, was playing there at the time. He was raised in his father's hometown of Córdoba, Argentina.

== Career ==
In 2020, Bocco signed for Mexican second-tier side Cancún. In 2022, he signed for Central Córdoba (Santiago del Estero) in the Argentine top flight.
