= Armando Méndez =

Uruguayan footballer (born 1996)

Personal information
- Full name: Armando Jesús Méndez Alcorta
- Date of birth: 31 March 1996 (age 30)
- Place of birth: Rodríguez, Uruguay
- Height: 1.76 m (5 ft 9 in)
- Position: Right-back

Team information
- Current team: Newell's Old Boys
- Number: 14

Youth career
- Peñarol
- River Plate
- Nacional

Senior career*
Years	Team	Apps	(Gls)
2018–2021	Nacional	64	(3)
2018–2019	→ Fénix (loan)	23	(0)
2022–	Newell's Old Boys	103	(1)
2025	→ Lanús (loan)	18	(0)
- * Club domestic league appearances and goals as of 17:26, 8 May 2026 (UTC)

Armando Jesús "Chiri" Méndez Alcorta (born 31 March 1996) is a Uruguayan professional footballer who plays as a right-back for Newell's Old Boys.

== Career ==
In 2019, Méndez returned from Fenix to Nacional, where he became known as "Hulk" to his teammates due to his intense weight training and protein diet, which included eating ten eggs a day. He attributed his quick jump to the Nacional first team to his weight training.

On 7 January 2022, Méndez joined Argentine club Newell's Old Boys on a deal until the end of 2024. On 2 February 2025, Mendez joined Lanús on a year-long loan, with an option to buy.

== Honours ==
Lanús

- Copa Sudamericana: 2025
