= Javier Sanguinetti =

Argentine footballer and manager

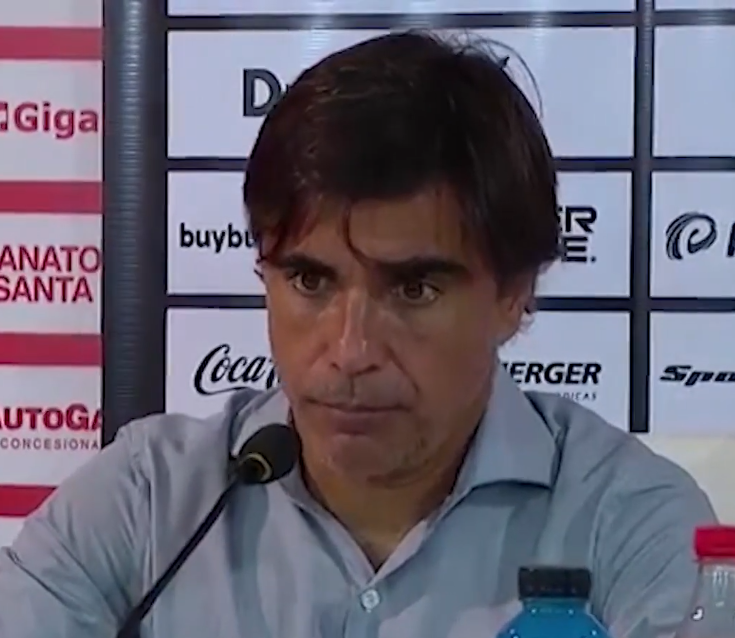
- Sanguinetti in 2022

Personal information
- Full name: Javier Estebán Sanguinetti
- Date of birth: 8 January 1971 (age 55)
- Place of birth: Lomas de Zamora, Argentina
- Height: 1.74 m (5 ft 9 in)
- Position: Defender

Team information
- Current team: Aldosivi (manager)

Senior career*
Years	Team	Apps	(Gls)
1990–1993	Banfield		
1993–1994	Racing Club	22	(0)
1994–2008	Banfield	462	(13)

Managerial career
- 2009–2010: Banfield (assistant)
- 2011–2012: Boca Juniors (assistant)
- 2013: All Boys (assistant)
- 2014: Universidad Católica (assistant)
- 2015: Quilmes (assistant)
- 2016: Sol de América
- 2017–2018: Sportivo Luqueño
- 2018: Sportivo Luqueño
- 2019: Sol de América
- 2019–2020: Banfield (assistant)
- 2020–2021: Banfield
- 2022: Newell's Old Boys
- 2022–2023: Banfield
- 2024: Huachipato
- 2024–2025: Sarmiento
- 2026–: Aldosivi
- * Club domestic league appearances and goals

Javier Estebán Sanguinetti (born 8 January 1971) is an Argentine football manager and former player. He is the current manager of Aldosivi.

Sanguinetti, a defender, played the majority of his career for Banfield.

== Career ==
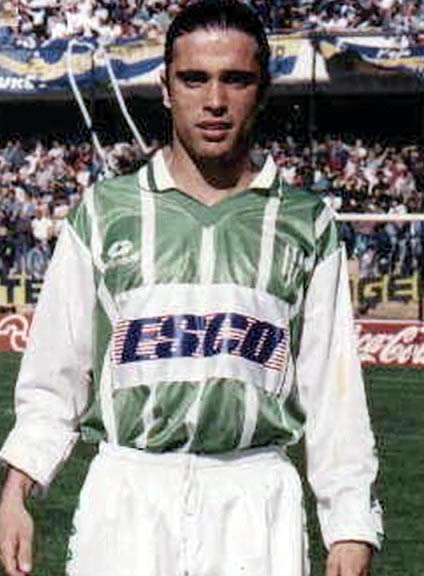
Sanguinetti as a Banfield player in 1994

Sanguinetti was born in Lomas de Zamora. He made his debut for Banfield on 6 April 1991 in a 2nd division game against Deportivo Morón. He was part of the squad that won the 2nd division title in 1992–93, securing promotion to the Primera División.

Sanguinetti joined Racing Club for the 1993–94 season, but returned to Banfield the following season. Banfield were relegated from the Primera in 1997, but Sanguinetti stayed with the club, eventually helping them to secure promotion back to the primera in 2001.

Sanguinetti holds a number of club records for Banfield, including the highest number of appearances in the Primera Division (over 300) and the highest total number of appearances for the club (over 450).

In May 2008, Sanguinetti announced he would retire at the end of the 2007–08 season, his last game came against River Plate, where he left the field to an ovation from both sets of fans after suffering an injury in the early part of the game.

== Honours ==
Banfield

- Primera B Nacional: 1992–93, 2000–01
