= Julio César Falcioni =

Argentine footballer and manager

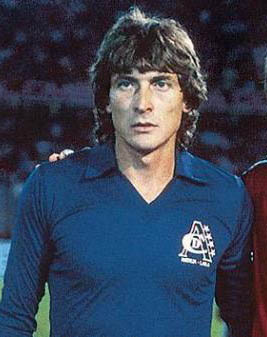
- Falcioni while playing for América de Cali (1986)

Personal information
- Full name: Julio César Falcioni
- Date of birth: 20 July 1956 (age 70)
- Place of birth: Buenos Aires, Argentina
- Height: 1.82 m (6 ft 0 in)
- Position: Goalkeeper

Team information
- Current team: Atlético Tucumán (manager)

Senior career*
Years	Team	Apps	(Gls)
1976–1980	Vélez Sársfield	229	(0)
1981–1989	América de Cali	376	(5)
1990	Gimnasia (LP)	19	(0)
1991	Once Caldas	4	(0)
1991	Vélez Sársfield	20	(0)
Total		648	(5)

International career
1989	Argentina	1	(0)

Managerial career
- 1997–2000: Vélez Sársfield
- 2002–2003: Olimpo
- 2003–2005: Banfield
- 2005–2006: Independiente
- 2006–2007: Colón
- 2007: Gimnasia de La Plata
- 2009–2010: Banfield
- 2011–2012: Boca Juniors
- 2013: All Boys
- 2014: Universidad Católica
- 2015: Quilmes
- 2016–2018: Banfield
- 2019–2020: Banfield
- 2021: Independiente
- 2022: Colón
- 2022: Independiente
- 2023–2024: Banfield
- 2026–: Atlético Tucumán
- * Club domestic league appearances and goals

Julio César Falcioni (born 20 July 1956 in Buenos Aires) is an Argentine football manager and former footballer who played as a goalkeeper. He is the current manager of Atlético Tucumán.

== Playing career ==
=== Club career ===
Falcioni started his career at Vélez Sársfield in the Primera division in 1976. In 1980, he moved to América de Cali in Colombia, where he won five league titles. Between 1985 and 1987, Falcioni was part of the América team that were runners up in the Copa Libertadores three consecutive seasons.

In 1990, Falcioni returned to Argentina to play for Gimnasia y Esgrima, and in 1991 he had short spells with Once Caldas in Colombia and with his first club Vélez Sársfield.

=== International career ===
Falcioni made one appearance for the Argentina national football team in 1989.

== Managerial career ==
Falcioni embarked on his managerial career in 1997 at the lower divisions of Vélez Sarsfield. He remained at the club until 2000.

He then had stints as manager of Olimpo, Banfield, Independiente, Colón de Santa Fe and Gimnasia y Esgrima de La Plata.

In 2009, he returned to Banfield and later that year led them to the Apertura 2009 championship, making them Argentine league champions for the first time in their history. On 22 December 2010, he left Banfield to become the manager of Boca Juniors. Within months he had caused controversy by leaving star player Juan Román Riquelme out of the team to face All Boys in the third round of the Clausura 2011 tournament even though the fans favourite was not suffering from any injuries.

Under his management, Boca Juniors won the Apertura 2011 of the Primera División Argentina for the first time since Apertura 2008. Undefeated and with only 4 goals against in 17 games, they were crowned champions after beating Banfield 3–0 in La Bombonera, two games before the tournament's end. At the end of the Torneo Inicial 2012, Boca decided not to renew his contract.

On 27 May 2014 Falcioni was named manager of Chilean Club Universidad Católica

== Managerial statistics ==
As of match played 23 October 2026

Managerial record by team and tenure
Team	Nat	From	To	Record							
Team	Nat	From	To	G	W	D	L	GF	GA	GD	Win %
Vélez Sársfield	(Argentina)	1 July 1997	30 June 2000	140	55	48	37	210	159	+51	39.29
Olimpo	(Argentina)	1 July 2002	6 July 2003	37	13	9	15	41	47	−6	35.14
Banfield	(Argentina)	7 July 2003	3 July 2005	88	39	25	24	125	91	+34	44.32
Independiente	(Argentina)	4 July 2005	30 June 2006	38	14	13	11	52	40	+12	36.84
Colón	(Argentina)	1 September 2006	29 April 2007	25	6	9	10	30	35	−5	24.00
Gimnasia de La Plata	(Argentina)	1 September 2007	31 December 2007	15	5	2	8	12	21	−9	33.33
Banfield	(Argentina)	25 March 2009	21 December 2010	81	33	25	23	106	77	+29	40.74
Boca Juniors	(Argentina)	22 December 2010	31 December 2012	99	47	37	15	134	86	+48	47.47
All Boys	(Argentina)	1 July 2013	17 November 2013	17	3	8	6	14	17	−3	17.65
Universidad Católica	(Chile)	27 May 2014	25 November 2014	23	7	3	13	22	28	−6	30.43
Quilmes	(Argentina)	1 January 2015	19 July 2015	18	5	4	9	21	26	−5	27.78
Banfield	(Argentina)	22 March 2016	31 December 2018	96	37	27	32	105	97	+8	38.54
Banfield	(Argentina)	4 September 2019	30 June 2020	20	5	9	6	16	18	−2	25.00
Independiente	(Argentina)	21 January 2021	28 December 2021	50	21	14	15	57	45	+12	42.00
Colón	(Argentina)	5 January 2022	7 July 2022	30	8	12	10	34	38	−4	26.67
Independiente	(Argentina)	2 August 2022	31 October 2022	18	7	7	4	22	17	+5	38.89
Banfield	(Argentina)	9 May 2023	15 June 2024	50	18	15	17	52	45	+7	36.00
Atlético Tucumán	(Argentina)	4 March 2026	present	26	9	9	8	29	22	+7	34.62
Total				868	331	275	262	1,082	909	+173	38.13

== Honours ==
=== Player ===
América de Cali

- Primera A: 1982, 1983, 1984, 1985, 1986
- Copa Libertadores: runner-up 1985, 1986, 1987

Argentina

- Copa América: Third-place 1989

=== Manager ===
Banfield

- Primera División Argentina: Apertura 2009

Boca Juniors

- Primera División Argentina: Apertura 2011
- Copa Libertadores: runner-up 2012
- Copa Argentina: 2011–12
