= Rodolfo De Paoli =

Argentine footballer and manager

Personal information
- Full name: Rodolfo Jorge De Paoli
- Date of birth: 26 October 1978 (age 48)
- Place of birth: Buenos Aires, Argentina
- Height: 1.80 m (5 ft 11 in)
- Position: Midfielder

Youth career
- Nueva Chicago

Senior career*
Years	Team	Apps	(Gls)
1997–1999	Nueva Chicago	0	(0)
1999–2000	Banfield	10	(0)
2000	El Porvenir		

Managerial career
- 2007–2008: Deportivo Riestra
- 2008–2009: Argentino de Merlo
- 2009: Dock Sud
- 2011–2012: Liniers
- 2015: Defensa y Justicia (assistant)
- 2017–2018: Real Pilar
- 2019–2020: Nueva Chicago
- 2021–2022: Barracas Central
- 2022–2023: Barracas Central
- 2023: Patronato
- 2024: Independiente Rivadavia
- * Club domestic league appearances and goals

Rodolfo Jorge De Paoli (born 26 October 1978) is an Argentine football manager and former player who played as a midfielder.

De Paoli was also a journalist and a narrator, notably being the main voice for Argentine-based version of the Pro Evolution Soccer series in the 2018, 2019, 2020 and 2021 editions.

== Playing career ==
Born in Buenos Aires, De Paoli began his career with Nueva Chicago, and subsequently represented Banfield before moving to Mexico and Ecuador.

Upon returning to his home country, De Paoli represented El Porvenir before retiring at the age of just 22 in 2000.

== Managerial career ==
In May 2007, De Paoli was named manager of Deportivo Riestra. He was subsequently in charge of Argentino de Merlo and Dock Sud before leaving the latter in 2009 to dedicate himself to becoming a full-time narrator.

On 19 October 2011, De Paoli returned to managerial duties after taking over Liniers. He resigned the following 11 March, after suffering four consecutive defeats.

In April 2015, De Paoli was invited by manager José Oscar Flores to take part of his coaching staff at Defensa y Justicia. On 21 November 2017, he agreed to return to coaching duties after being appointed at Real Pilar, but announced his departure from the club the following 2 June.

On 23 September 2019, after more than a year without coaching, De Paoli was named manager of his first side Nueva Chicago. He resigned the following 3 March, with the club in the last position.

On 26 January 2021, De Paoli was appointed Barracas Central manager. In December, he helped the club to achieve promotion to the Primera División after an 87-year absence.

De Paoli resigned from Barracas on 21 February 2022, but returned to the club with Alejandro Milano on 15 August. The following 11 April, the duo left on a mutual agreement.

On 24 November 2023, De Paoli replaced Alfredo Berti at the helm of Independiente Rivadavia, newly promoted to the top tier.

== Personal life ==
In August 2017, De Paoli was announced as the main narrator of the Argentine-based version of the Pro Evolution Soccer series, starting in the 2018 edition.
