= 2021 AFA Liga Profesional de Fútbol =

131st season of top-tier football league in Argentina

Liga Profesional de Fútbol
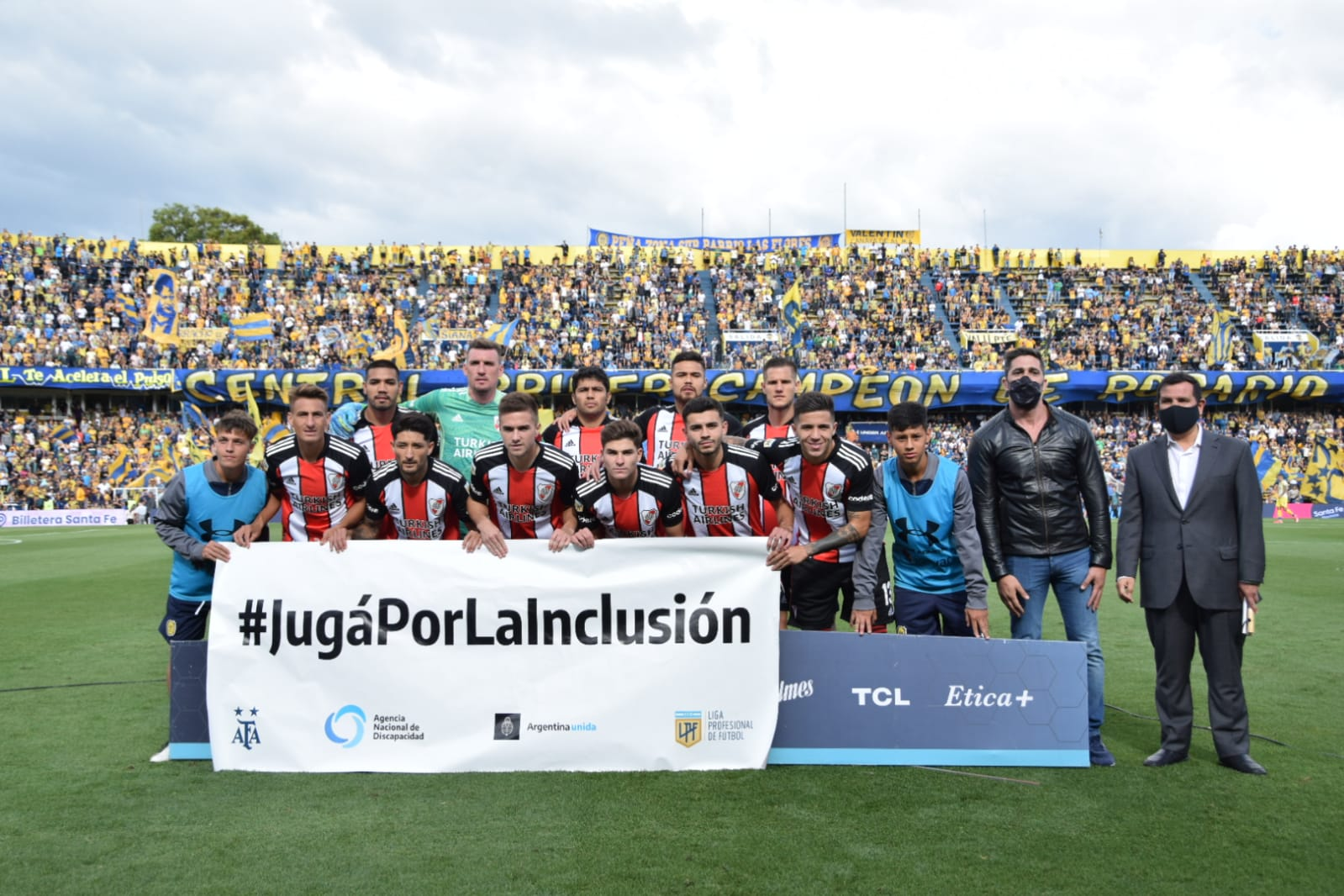
- River Plate, champions
- Season: 2021
- Dates: 16 July – 13 December 2021
- Champions: River Plate (37th title)
- Copa Libertadores: River Plate; Vélez Sarsfield; Talleres (C); Estudiantes (LP); Colón (via Copa LPF); Boca Juniors (via Copa Argentina)
- Copa Sudamericana: Defensa y Justicia; Independiente; Lanús; Racing; Unión; Banfield (via Copa LPF)
- Matches: 325
- Goals: 796 (2.45 per match)
- Top goalscorer: Julián Álvarez (18 goals)
- Biggest home win: Boca Juniors 8–1 Central Córdoba (SdE) (11 December 2021)
- Biggest away win: Atlético Tucumán 0–4 Defensa y Justicia (24 November 2021)
- Highest scoring: Boca Juniors 8–1 Central Córdoba (SdE) (11 December 2021)
- Longest winning run: River Plate; 8 games
- Longest unbeaten run: River Plate; 18 games
- Longest winless run: Patronato; 12 games
- Longest losing run: Aldosivi; 8 games

The 2021 Liga Profesional de Fútbol (officially the Torneo Socios.com for sponsorship reasons) was the 131st season of top-flight professional football in Argentina. The league season began on 16 July and ended on 13 December 2021.

Twenty-six teams competed in the league: the 24 teams that took part in the previous Primera División season as well as two promoted teams from the 2020 Primera Nacional (Sarmiento (J) and Platense). Boca Juniors were the defending champions.

River Plate won their 37th national league championship with three matches to spare after they defeated Racing 4–0 on 25 November 2021.

== Competition format ==
The competition was run under a single round-robin, contested by 26 teams (24 from the previous edition plus 2 promoted from Primera Nacional). The champions qualified for the 2022 Copa Libertadores as Argentina 2. The qualification for international tournaments was determined by an aggregate table of the 2021 Primera División and 2021 Copa de la Liga Profesional first stage tournaments.

== Club information ==
=== Stadia and locations ===
Locations of the 2021 Argentine Primera División teams outside Greater Buenos Aires.
Locations of the 2021 Argentine Primera División teams within Greater Buenos Aires.

Club	City	Stadium	Capacity
Aldosivi	Mar del Plata	José María Minella	35,354
Argentinos Juniors	Buenos Aires	Diego Armando Maradona	25,000
Arsenal	Sarandí	Julio Humberto Grondona	16,300
Atlético Tucumán	Tucumán	Monumental José Fierro	32,700
Banfield	Banfield	Florencio Sola	34,901
Boca Juniors	Buenos Aires	Alberto J. Armando	54,000
Central Córdoba (SdE)	Santiago del Estero	Único Madre de Ciudades	30,000
Central Córdoba (SdE)	Santiago del Estero	Alfredo Terrera	16,000
Colón	Santa Fe	Brigadier General Estanislao López	40,000
Defensa y Justicia	Florencio Varela	Norberto "Tito" Tomaghello	12,000
Estudiantes (LP)	La Plata	Jorge Luis Hirschi	30,000
Gimnasia y Esgrima (LP)	La Plata	Juan Carmelo Zerillo	24,544
Godoy Cruz	Godoy Cruz	Feliciano Gambarte	14,000
Huracán	Buenos Aires	Tomás Adolfo Ducó	48,314
Independiente	Avellaneda	Libertadores de América	52,853
Lanús	Lanús	Ciudad de Lanús - Néstor Díaz Pérez	46,619
Newell's Old Boys	Rosario	Marcelo Bielsa	38,095
Patronato	Paraná	Presbítero Bartolomé Grella	22,000
Platense	Florida Este	Ciudad de Vicente López	28,530
Racing	Avellaneda	Presidente Perón	55,389
River Plate	Buenos Aires	Monumental Antonio Vespucio Liberti	70,074
Rosario Central	Rosario	Gigante de Arroyito	41,654
San Lorenzo	Buenos Aires	Pedro Bidegain	39,494
Sarmiento (J)	Junín	Eva Perón	19,000
Talleres (C)	Córdoba	Mario Alberto Kempes	57,000
Unión	Santa Fe	15 de Abril	22,852
Vélez Sarsfield	Buenos Aires	José Amalfitani	45,540

=== Personnel ===
Club	Manager	Kit manufacturer	Sponsor
Aldosivi	(Argentina) Martín Palermo	Kappa	Uthgra Sasso Hotel
Argentinos Juniors	(Argentina) Gabriel Milito	Umbro	Bumeran
Arsenal	(Argentina) Darío Espínola (caretaker)	Sport Lyon	La Nueva Seguros
Atlético Tucumán	(Argentina) Martín Anastacio (caretaker)	Umbro	Secco
Banfield	(Argentina) Diego Dabove	Givova	ORBIS Seguros
Boca Juniors	(Argentina) Sebastián Battaglia (caretaker)	Adidas	Qatar Airways
Central Córdoba (SdE)	(Argentina) Sergio Rondina	Adhoc	Banco Santiago del Estero
Colón	(Argentina) Eduardo Domínguez	Kelme	Cablevideo Digital
Defensa y Justicia	(Argentina) Sebastián Beccacece	Sport Lyon	Planes ESCO
Estudiantes (LP)	(Argentina) Ricardo Zielinski	Under Armour	bplay
Gimnasia y Esgrima (LP)	(Argentina) Néstor Gorosito	Hummel	RapiCuota$
Godoy Cruz	(Argentina) Diego Flores	Fiume Sport	CATA Internacional
Huracán	(Argentina) Frank Darío Kudelka	Peak	Banco Ciudad / DECRYPTO
Independiente	(Argentina) Julio César Falcioni	Puma	$CAI Fan Token
Lanús	(Argentina) Luis Zubeldía	Peak	Mapei
Newell's Old Boys	(Argentina) Adrián Taffarel (caretaker)	Umbro	Adelante Broker Inmobiliario
Patronato	(Argentina) Iván Delfino	Axfiu	Banco Entre Ríos
Platense	(Argentina) Claudio Spontón	Kelme	Escudo Seguros
Racing	(Argentina) Fernando Gago	Kappa	Aeroset
River Plate	(Argentina) Marcelo Gallardo	Adidas	Turkish Airlines
Rosario Central	(Argentina) Kily González	Under Armour	Banco Municipal / Adelante Broker Inmobiliario
San Lorenzo	(Argentina) Daniel Di Leo and (Argentina) Diego Monarriz (caretakers)	Nike	Banco Ciudad
Sarmiento (J)	(Argentina) Martín Funes (caretaker)	Coach	Naldo
Talleres (C)	(Uruguay) Alexander Medina	Givova	ICBC Argentina
Unión	(Uruguay) Gustavo Munúa	Kappa	OSPAT
Vélez Sarsfield	(Argentina) Mauricio Pellegrino	Kappa	bplay

=== Managerial changes ===
Team	Outgoing manager	Manner of departure	Date of vacancy	Position in table	Replaced by	Date of appointment
Godoy Cruz	(Argentina) Daniel Oldrá	Replaced	9 January 2021	Pre-season	(Argentina) Sebastián Méndez	10 January 2021
Independiente	(Argentina) Fernando Berón	Replaced	9 January 2021	Pre-season	(Argentina) Julio César Falcioni	19 January 2021
Racing	(Argentina) Sebastián Beccacece	Resigned	9 January 2021	Pre-season	(Spain) Juan Antonio Pizzi	14 January 2021
Atlético Tucumán	(Argentina) Ricardo Zielinski	End of contract	10 January 2021	Pre-season	(Argentina) Omar De Felippe	11 January 2021
Central Córdoba (SdE)	(Argentina) Alexis Ferrero and (Argentina) Sebastián Scolari	Replaced	11 January 2021	Pre-season	(Argentina) Gustavo Coleoni	12 January 2021
Estudiantes (LP)	(Argentina) Pablo Quatrocchi	Replaced	11 January 2021	Pre-season	(Argentina) Ricardo Zielinski	12 January 2021
San Lorenzo	(Argentina) Mariano Soso	Resigned	11 January 2021	Pre-season	(Argentina) Diego Dabove	19 January 2021
Argentinos Juniors	(Argentina) Diego Dabove	Resigned	12 January 2021	Pre-season	(Argentina) Gabriel Milito	19 January 2021
Aldosivi	(Argentina) Favio Fernández	Replaced	14 January 2021	Pre-season	(Argentina) Fernando Gago	16 January 2021
Defensa y Justicia	(Argentina) Hernán Crespo	Resigned	7 February 2021	Pre-season	(Argentina) Sebastián Beccacece ^{1}	15 February 2021
Copa de la Liga Profesional changes
Newell's Old Boys	(Argentina) Frank Darío Kudelka	Mutual agreement	13 March 2021	12th Zone B	(Argentina) Germán Burgos	14 March 2021
Huracán	(Argentina) Israel Damonte	Sacked	20 March 2021	8th Zone B	(Argentina) Frank Darío Kudelka ^{2}	26 March 2021
Inter-tournament changes
Platense	(Argentina) Juan Manuel Llop	Mutual agreement	9 May 2021	N/A	(Argentina) Leonardo Madelón	15 May 2021
San Lorenzo	(Argentina) Diego Dabove	Resigned	9 May 2021	N/A	(Uruguay) Paolo Montero ^{3}	11 June 2021
Newell's Old Boys	(Argentina) Germán Burgos	Sacked	8 June 2021	N/A	(Argentina) Fernando Gamboa	13 June 2021
Liga Profesional changes
Racing	(Spain) Juan Antonio Pizzi	Sacked	9 August 2021	9th	(Argentina) Claudio Úbeda ^{4}	11 August 2021
Arsenal	(Argentina) Sergio Rondina	Resigned	16 August 2021	22nd	(Argentina) Israel Damonte	18 August 2021
Boca Juniors	(Argentina) Miguel Ángel Russo	Sacked	16 August 2021	24th	(Argentina) Sebastián Battaglia ^{5}	17 August 2021
Gimnasia y Esgrima (LP)	(Argentina) Mariano Messera and (Argentina) Leandro Martini	Sacked	29 August 2021	16th	(Argentina) Néstor Gorosito	31 August 2021
Central Córdoba (SdE)	(Argentina) Gustavo Coleoni	Sacked	29 August 2021	25th	(Argentina) Sergio Rondina ^{6}	6 September 2021
Godoy Cruz	(Argentina) Sebastián Méndez	Resigned	29 August 2021	19th	(Argentina) Diego Flores	30 August 2021
Platense	(Argentina) Leonardo Madelón	Resigned	21 September 2021	23rd	(Argentina) Claudio Spontón ^{7}	21 September 2021
Unión	(Argentina) Juan Manuel Azconzábal	Sacked	22 September 2021	22nd	(Uruguay) Gustavo Munúa ^{8}	4 October 2021
Aldosivi	(Argentina) Fernando Gago	Resigned	27 September 2021	23rd	(Argentina) Martín Palermo ^{9}	3 October 2021
Atlético Tucumán	(Argentina) Omar De Felippe	Resigned	12 October 2021	21st	(Argentina) Pablo Guiñazú ^{10}	18 October 2021
Newell's Old Boys	(Argentina) Fernando Gamboa	Sacked	17 October 2021	21st	(Argentina) Adrián Taffarel ^{11}	18 October 2021
Racing	(Argentina) Claudio Úbeda	Replaced	19 October 2021	11th	(Argentina) Fernando Gago	21 October 2021
Banfield	(Argentina) Javier Sanguinetti	Resigned	21 October 2021	24th	(Argentina) Diego Dabove ^{12}	26 October 2021
San Lorenzo	(Uruguay) Paolo Montero	Sacked	21 October 2021	20th	(Argentina) Daniel Di Leo and (Argentina) Diego Monarriz ^{13}	22 October 2021
Sarmiento (J)	(Argentina) Mario Sciacqua	Mutual agreement	8 November 2021	18th	(Argentina) Martín Funes ^{11}	11 November 2021
Arsenal	(Argentina) Israel Damonte	Resigned	21 November 2021	26th	(Argentina) Darío Espínola ^{11}	22 November 2021
Atlético Tucumán	(Argentina) Pablo Guiñazú	Resigned	25 November 2021	23rd	(Argentina) Martín Anastacio ^{11}	26 November 2021

Interim managers

1. (Argentina) Pablo De Muner was interim manager in the 2021 Copa de la Liga Profesional Group stage 1st round.
2. (Argentina) Gabriel Rinaldi and (Argentina) Gastón Casas were interim managers during the remaining 18 minutes of the suspended 2021 Copa de la Liga Profesional Group stage 3rd round.
3. (Argentina) Leandro Romagnoli was interim manager in the 2021 Copa Sudamericana Group stage 4th–6th rounds.
4. Úbeda would be interim manager until the end of the tournament, but only was interim manager in the 6th–17th rounds.
5. Interim manager until the end of the tournament. Battaglia was promoted to manager after the tournament.
6. (Argentina) Adrián Adrover and (Argentina) Sebastián Scolari were interim managers in the 10th round.
7. Interim manager, but later promoted to manager.
8. (Argentina) Marcelo Mosset was interim manager in the 13th–14th rounds.
9. (Argentina) Facundo Oreja and (Argentina) Diego Villar were interim managers in the 14th round.
10. (Argentina) Martín Anastacio was interim manager in the 16th round.
11. Interim manager until the end of the tournament.
12. (Argentina) Hugo Donato was interim manager in the 18th round.
13. Interim managers until the end of the tournament.

=== Foreign players ===
Club	Player 1	Player 2	Player 3	Player 4	Player 5	Player 6
Aldosivi	(Uruguay) Martín Cauteruccio	(Uruguay) Federico Gino	(Paraguay) Mario López Quintana	(Paraguay) Marcos Miers	(Paraguay) Fernando Román	
Argentinos Juniors	(Paraguay) Gabriel Ávalos	(Uruguay) Javier Cabrera	(Uruguay) Jonathan Sandoval			
Arsenal						
Atlético Tucumán	(Chile) Felipe Campos					
Banfield	(Colombia) Mauricio Cuero					
Boca Juniors	(Peru) Luis Advíncula	(Colombia) Jorman Campuzano	(Colombia) Edwin Cardona	(Colombia) Sebastián Villa	(Peru) Carlos Zambrano	
Central Córdoba (SdE)	(Uruguay) Federico Andueza	(Uruguay) Matías Mier	(Colombia) Dixon Rentería	(Uruguay) Sebastián Ribas		
Colón	(Uruguay) Leonardo Burián	(Colombia) Yéiler Góez	(Colombia) Wilson Morelo			
Defensa y Justicia	(Paraguay) Hugo Fernández	(Colombia) Raúl Loaiza	(Paraguay) Aldo Maiz	(Uruguay) Miguel Merentiel		
Estudiantes (LP)	(Uruguay) Matías Aguirregaray	(Ecuador) Jaime Ayoví	(Uruguay) Manuel Castro	(Uruguay) Agustín Rogel		
Gimnasia y Esgrima (LP)	(Uruguay) Brahian Alemán	(Colombia) Johan Carbonero	(Uruguay) Guillermo Fratta	(Colombia) Harrinson Mancilla		
Godoy Cruz	(Ecuador) Jeison Chalá	(Paraguay) Cristian Colmán	(Paraguay) Juan Espínola			
Huracán	(Uruguay) Jhonatan Candia	(Uruguay) Matías Cóccaro	(Colombia) José Moya	(Colombia) Sebastián Rincón		
Independiente	(Uruguay) Renzo Bacchia	(Uruguay) Carlos Benavídez	(Colombia) Andrés Felipe Roa	(Uruguay) Diego Segovia	(Uruguay) Sebastián Sosa	
Lanús	(Paraguay) Jorge Morel					
Newell's Old Boys	(Paraguay) José Canale	(Colombia) Pablo Sabbag				
Patronato	(Uruguay) Nicolás Albarracín	(Uruguay) Junior Arias	(Paraguay) Rolando García Guerreño	(Uruguay) Hugo Magallanes	(Uruguay) Sebastián Sosa Sánchez	
Platense	(Colombia) Jean Carlos Colorado					
Racing	(Ecuador) Gustavo Cortez	(Uruguay) Fabricio Domínguez	(Chile) Eugenio Mena	(Uruguay) Fernando Prado	(Paraguay) Matías Rojas	
River Plate	(Colombia) Jorge Carrascal	(Uruguay) Nicolás de la Cruz	(Chile) Paulo Díaz	(Colombia) Flabián Londoño	(Paraguay) Robert Rojas	
Rosario Central	(Venezuela) Michael Covea	(Paraguay) Ricardo Garay	(Uruguay) Martín Rabuñal	(Uruguay) Diego Zabala		
San Lorenzo	(Colombia) Yeison Gordillo	(Colombia) Cristian Zapata				
Sarmiento (J)						
Talleres (C)	(Uruguay) Diego García	(Brazil) Guilherme Parede	(Colombia) Rafa Pérez	(Uruguay) Michael Santos	(Colombia) Diego Valoyes	
Unión	(Chile) Nicolás Peñailillo					
Vélez Sarsfield	(Uruguay) Matías de los Santos	(Uruguay) Enzo Martínez				

==== Players holding Argentinian dual nationality ====
They do not take foreign slot.

- (United States) Joel Soñora (Banfield)
- (Armenia) Norberto Briasco (Boca Juniors)
- (Colombia) Frank Fabra (Boca Juniors)
- (Paraguay) Lucas Barrios (Defensa y Justicia)
- (Italy) Tomás Sosa (Defensa y Justicia)
- (Brazil) Vinicius Lansade (Estudiantes (LP))
- (United States) Matías Soria (Godoy Cruz)
- (United States) Alan Soñora (Independiente)
- (Chile) Gabriel Arias (Racing)
- (Italy) Ezequiel Schelotto (Racing)
- (Paraguay) David Martínez (River Plate)
- (Mexico) Luca Martínez (Rosario Central)
- (Paraguay) Néstor Ortigoza (San Lorenzo)
- (Switzerland) Dylan Gissi (Unión)
- (Bolivia) Carlos Lampe (Vélez Sarsfield)
- (Brazil) Lenny Lobato (Vélez Sarsfield)

Source: AFA

== League table ==
Pos	Team	Pld	W	D	L	GF	GA	GD	Pts	Qualification
1	River Plate (C)	25	16	6	3	53	19	+34	54	Qualification for Copa Libertadores group stage
2	Defensa y Justicia	25	13	8	4	43	24	+19	47	
3	Talleres (C)	25	14	4	7	38	28	+10	46	
4	Boca Juniors	25	11	8	6	35	19	+16	41	
5	Vélez Sarsfield	25	10	9	6	34	21	+13	39	
6	Estudiantes (LP)	25	10	9	6	43	31	+12	39	
7	Colón	25	11	6	8	26	31	−5	39	
8	Huracán	25	10	8	7	28	25	+3	38	
9	Independiente	25	10	8	7	27	24	+3	38	
10	Lanús	25	10	7	8	44	43	+1	37	
11	Gimnasia y Esgrima (LP)	25	9	9	7	27	28	−1	36	
12	Unión	25	10	4	11	32	32	0	34	
13	Aldosivi	25	10	3	12	29	39	−10	33	
14	Argentinos Juniors	25	8	8	9	26	25	+1	32	
15	Racing	25	8	8	9	24	23	+1	32	
16	Rosario Central	25	9	5	11	39	41	−2	32	
17	Godoy Cruz	25	8	7	10	35	33	+2	31	
18	Platense	25	7	10	8	36	36	0	31	
19	Newell's Old Boys	25	7	7	11	24	32	−8	28	
20	Banfield	25	5	12	8	20	25	−5	27	
21	San Lorenzo	25	7	6	12	23	33	−10	27	
22	Central Córdoba (SdE)	25	6	8	11	30	36	−6	26	
23	Patronato	25	5	10	10	23	35	−12	25	
24	Sarmiento (J)	25	6	6	13	23	33	−10	24	
25	Atlético Tucumán	25	5	7	13	22	46	−24	22	
26	Arsenal	25	4	9	12	12	34	−22	21	

Source: AFA
Rules for classification: 1) points; 2) play-off (only if needed to decide championship); 3) goal difference; 4) goals scored; 5) head-to-head points; 6) head-to-head goal difference; 7) head-to-head goals scored.
(C) Champions

2021 Argentine Primera División champions

37th title

== Results ==
Teams played every other team once (either at home or away) completing a total of 25 rounds.

Home \ Away	ALD	ARG	ARS	ATU	BAN	BOC	CCO	COL	DYJ	EST	GLP	GOD	HUR	IND	LAN	NOB	PAT	PLA	RAC	RIV	ROS	SLO	SAR	TAL	UNI	VEL
Aldosivi	—	3–2	2–1	—	—	0–3	—	3–0	1–0	—	1–3	1–4	—	1–0	2–3	—	0–2	—	0–2	—	—	2–0	—	—	1–2	—
Argentinos Juniors	—	—	—	—	2–0	—	1–1	3–1	0–2	—	3–0	0–0	—	—	0–1	1–0	1–1	—	2–0	—	—	—	2–0	1–2	—	—
Arsenal	—	1–0	—	—	—	1–1	—	0–0	0–0	—	0–1	0–0	—	—	1–0	3–1	2–2	—	0–3	—	—	1–1	1–0	—	0–1	—
Atlético Tucumán	2–2	4–3	0–0	—	—	1–2	—	—	0–4	—	—	—	1–0	2–0	—	—	2–2	—	0–2	1–1	—	0–0	—	—	—	0–0
Banfield	0–2	—	0–0	2–0	—	0–0	—	—	—	1–1	—	—	1–4	4–1	—	—	—	2–4	—	0–1	1–2	—	—	0–1	—	2–1
Boca Juniors	—	1–1	—	—	—	—	8–1	1–0	0–0	—	0–1	2–1	—	—	4–2	0–0	1–0	—	0–0	—	—	0–2	2–0	—	—	—
Central Córdoba (SdE)	0–0	—	5–0	2–0	1–1	—	—	—	—	1–2	—	—	1–2	1–0	—	—	—	2–2	—	1–3	2–4	—	—	2–1	2–0	1–2
Colón	—	—	—	3–0	0–0	—	1–0	—	—	2–1	1–0	1–0	—	—	1–4	1–1	—	3–0	—	—	1–4	—	1–1	1–0	—	—
Defensa y Justicia	—	—	—	—	0–0	—	1–1	1–1	—	2–1	3–2	1–2	—	—	2–1	2–0	—	2–1	—	—	3–0	—	4–2	3–0	—	—
Estudiantes (LP)	2–3	1–1	4–0	1–1	—	1–0	—	—	—	—	—	—	4–1	0–1	—	—	—	1–1	—	1–1	2–2	2–0	—	—	—	1–0
Gimnasia y Esgrima (LP)	—	—	—	1–0	0–1	—	2–2	—	—	4–4	—	—	0–0	—	—	1–0	—	2–2	—	1–1	1–0	—	0–1	5–2	1–0	0–0
Godoy Cruz	—	—	—	1–2	2–1	—	0–0	—	—	1–3	4–0	—	1–1	—	—	2–2	—	2–2	—	2–1	2–1	—	1–1	0–2	1–2	—
Huracán	2–0	1–1	1–0	—	—	0–3	—	1–1	2–1	—	—	—	—	0–1	0–1	—	1–0	—	1–0	—	—	2–1	—	—	0–0	1–1
Independiente	—	0–0	3–0	—	—	1–0	—	3–0	0–0	—	1–1	1–4	—	—	0–1	—	2–0	—	1–0	—	—	1–1	1–1	—	1–0	—
Lanús	—	—	—	4–2	1–1	—	2–1	—	—	1–1	2–0	3–1	—	—	—	1–2	—	3–3	—	0–3	2–2	—	1–1	3–3	1–1	—
Newell's Old Boys	0–0	—	—	1–2	0–0	—	1–0	—	—	4–2	—	—	0–1	1–0	—	—	—	1–0	—	1–4	1–1	—	—	3–2	1–0	1–2
Patronato	—	—	—	—	1–1	—	1–0	2–0	3–3	1–2	0–0	0–3	—	—	3–2	0–0	—	—	1–2	—	—	—	2–0	0–0	—	—
Platense	0–1	0–0	2–1	4–1	—	1–3	—	—	—	—	—	—	4–2	1–1	—	—	0–0	—	—	0–1	1–1	1–1	—	—	—	3–2
Racing	—	—	—	—	0–0	—	0–0	1–2	1–2	1–1	0–0	2–1	—	—	3–1	2–0	—	0–1	—	—	—	—	1–0	1–2	—	—
River Plate	2–0	3–0	1–0	—	—	2–1	—	1–2	2–3	—	—	—	1–1	1–1	—	—	5–0	—	4–0	—	—	3–1	—	—	4–0	2–0
Rosario Central	1–2	0–1	4–0	3–1	—	1–2	—	—	—	—	—	—	1–4	1–2	—	—	3–2	—	2–1	2–2	—	1–0	—	—	—	1–0
San Lorenzo	—	0–1	—	—	1–1	—	1–0	1–2	2–1	—	0–1	1–0	—	—	1–3	3–2	3–0	—	1–1	—	—	—	1–0	—	—	—
Sarmiento (J)	3–0	—	—	3–0	0–0	—	1–3	—	—	0–3	—	—	0–0	—	—	2–1	—	1–0	—	1–2	1–0	—	—	1–2	3–4	0–1
Talleres (C)	2–0	—	2–0	2–0	—	0–0	—	—	—	2–0	—	—	1–0	1–2	—	—	—	2–1	—	0–2	4–1	2–0	—	—	—	1–1
Unión	—	1–0	—	3–0	0–1	1–1	—	3–0	2–3	0–2	—	—	—	—	—	—	2–0	1–2	1–1	—	3–1	4–0	—	1–2	—	—
Vélez Sarsfield	3–2	2–0	0–0	—	—	2–0	—	0–1	0–0	—	—	3–0	—	3–3	5–1	—	0–0	—	0–0	—	—	2–1	—	—	4–0	—

Source: AFA
Legend: Blue = home team win; Yellow = draw; Red = away team win.

== Season statistics ==
=== Top goalscorers ===
Rank	Player	Club	Goals
1	(Argentina) Julián Álvarez	River Plate	18
2	(Argentina) José Sand	Lanús	15
2	(Argentina) Marco Ruben	Rosario Central	15
4	(Argentina) Matías Tissera	Platense	14
5	(Argentina) José Manuel López	Lanús	13
6	(Argentina) Martín Ojeda	Godoy Cruz	12
7	(Argentina) Milton Giménez	Central Córdoba (SdE)	11
8	(Uruguay) Martín Cauteruccio	Aldosivi	10
8	(Argentina) Walter Bou	Defensa y Justicia	10
8	(Uruguay) Miguel Merentiel	Defensa y Justicia	10
8	(Argentina) Leandro Díaz	Estudiantes (LP)	10
8	(Argentina) Silvio Romero	Independiente	10
8	(Argentina) Braian Romero	River Plate	10

Source: AFA

=== Top assists ===
Rank	Player	Club	Assists
1	(Argentina) Carlos Rotondi	Defensa y Justicia	8
1	(Argentina) Ignacio Malcorra	Lanús	8
1	(Argentina) Agustín Palavecino	River Plate	8
4	(Argentina) Francisco Pizzini	Defensa y Justicia	7
4	(Argentina) Lautaro Blanco	Rosario Central	7
6	(Argentina) Malcom Braida	Aldosivi	6
6	(Argentina) Julián Álvarez	River Plate	6
8	(Argentina) Fernando Zuqui	Estudiantes (LP)	5
8	(Argentina) Alan Velasco	Independiente	5
8	(Argentina) Matías Esquivel	Lanús	5
8	(Argentina) Nicolás Castro	Newell's Old Boys	5
8	(Argentina) Emiliano Vecchio	Rosario Central	5
8	(Argentina) Enzo Díaz	Talleres (C)	5
8	(Argentina) Gastón González	Unión	5
8	(Argentina) Juan Ignacio Nardoni	Unión	5
8	(Argentina) Federico Mancuello	Vélez Sarsfield	5

Source: AFA

== International qualification ==
The 2021 Argentine Primera División champions, 2021 Copa de la Liga Profesional champions and 2019–20 Copa Argentina champions earned a berth to the 2022 Copa Libertadores, while the 2020 Copa de la Liga Profesional play-off winners qualified for the 2022 Copa Sudamericana. The remaining berths to the 2022 Copa Libertadores as well as the ones to the 2022 Copa Sudamericana were determined by an aggregate table of the 2021 Argentine Primera División and 2021 Copa de la Liga Profesional first stage tournaments. The top three teams in the aggregate table not already qualified for any international tournament qualified for the Copa Libertadores, while the next five teams qualified for the Copa Sudamericana.

=== Aggregate table ===
Pos	Team	Pld	W	D	L	GF	GA	GD	Pts	Qualification
1	River Plate	38	22	9	7	78	30	+48	75	Qualification for Copa Libertadores group stage (Note: River Plate, Colón and Boca Juniors qualified for the Copa Libertadores group stage by winning the 2021 Argentine Primera División, the 2021 Copa de la Liga Profesional and the 2019–20 Copa Argentina, respectively.)
2	Vélez Sarsfield	38	20	10	8	57	34	+23	70	Qualification for Copa Libertadores group stage
3	Talleres (C)	38	19	9	10	57	44	+13	66	Qualification for Copa Libertadores group stage
4	Colón	38	18	10	10	49	41	+8	64	Qualification for Copa Libertadores group stage
5	Boca Juniors	38	17	12	9	57	31	+26	63	Qualification for Copa Libertadores group stage
6	Estudiantes (LP)	38	16	13	9	59	41	+18	61	Qualification for Copa Libertadores second stage
7	Defensa y Justicia	38	16	11	11	58	45	+13	59	Qualification for Copa Sudamericana group stage
8	Independiente	38	16	10	12	43	34	+9	58	Qualification for Copa Sudamericana group stage
9	Lanús	38	16	8	14	62	61	+1	56	Qualification for Copa Sudamericana group stage
10	Racing	38	14	11	13	38	35	+3	53	Qualification for Copa Sudamericana group stage
11	Unión	38	14	11	13	44	46	−2	53	Qualification for Copa Sudamericana group stage
12	Argentinos Juniors	38	13	12	13	40	36	+4	51	
13	Huracán	38	12	15	11	42	42	0	51	
14	Gimnasia y Esgrima (LP)	38	12	15	11	42	48	−6	51	
15	Rosario Central	38	14	8	16	55	59	−4	50	
16	San Lorenzo	38	13	9	16	39	49	−10	48	
17	Banfield	38	10	17	11	34	37	−3	47	Qualification for Copa Sudamericana group stage (Note: Banfield qualified for the Copa Sudamericana group stage by winning the 2020 Copa de la Liga Profesional play-off.)
18	Godoy Cruz	38	12	10	16	53	57	−4	46	
19	Platense	38	11	12	15	48	55	−7	45	
20	Aldosivi	38	13	5	20	44	60	−16	44	
21	Central Córdoba (SdE)	38	10	13	15	44	53	−9	43	
22	Atlético Tucumán	38	10	10	18	46	66	−20	40	
23	Newell's Old Boys	38	9	12	17	38	53	−15	39	
24	Patronato	38	9	10	19	35	52	−17	37	
25	Sarmiento (J)	38	8	12	18	33	52	−19	36	
26	Arsenal	38	7	12	19	23	57	−34	33	

Source: AFA
Rules for classification: 1) points; 2) goal difference; 3) goals scored; 4) head-to-head points; 5) head-to-head goal difference; 6) head-to-head goals scored.

== Relegation ==
Relegation at the end of the season would be based on coefficients, which take into consideration the points obtained by the clubs during the present season (aggregate table points) and the two previous seasons (only seasons at the top flight are counted). The total tally is then divided by the number of games played in the top flight over those three seasons and an average is calculated. The three teams with the worst average at the end of the season would have been relegated to Primera Nacional. Relegation was suspended by AFA at the end of the 2019–20 season until 2022 due to the COVID-19 pandemic, however, the points earned in this season will count towards relegation in the 2022 season.

Pos	Team	2019–20 Pts	2021 Pts	Total Pts	Total Pld	Avg
1	River Plate	47	75	122	62	1.968
2	Boca Juniors	51	63	114	62	1.839
3	Vélez Sarsfield	39	70	109	62	1.758
4	Talleres (C)	37	66	103	62	1.661
5	Defensa y Justicia	39	59	98	62	1.581
6	Racing	42	53	95	62	1.532
7	Argentinos Juniors	42	51	93	62	1.5
8	Lanús	36	56	92	62	1.484
9	Estudiantes (LP)	30	61	91	62	1.468
10	Independiente	32	58	90	62	1.452
11	San Lorenzo	39	48	87	62	1.403
12	Rosario Central	36	50	86	62	1.387
13	Colón	21	64	85	62	1.371
14	Unión	28	53	81	62	1.306
15	Newell's Old Boys	38	39	77	62	1.242
16	Gimnasia y Esgrima (LP)	24	51	75	62	1.21
17	Banfield	27	47	74	62	1.194
18	Platense	—	45	45	38	1.184
19	Huracán	22	51	73	62	1.177
20	Atlético Tucumán	32	40	72	62	1.161
21	Central Córdoba (SdE)	26	43	69	62	1.113
22	Arsenal	35	33	68	62	1.097
23	Aldosivi	22	44	66	62	1.065
24	Godoy Cruz	18	46	64	62	1.032
25	Patronato	23	37	60	62	0.968
26	Sarmiento (J)	—	36	36	38	0.947

Source: AFA
