= Carlos Wilson =

Carlos Wilson may refer to:

- Carlos Wilson (footballer, 1899-1952), Argentine football goalkeeper
- Carlos Wilson (footballer, 1912-1996), Argentine football defender
