= Lorenzo Monti =

Argentine footballer

Personal information
- Full name: Lorenzo Monti Azpiazu
- Date of birth: 2 March 1998 (age 28)
- Place of birth: Argentina
- Position: Midfielder

Team information
- Current team: Temperley

Youth career
- Acassuso

Senior career*
Years	Team	Apps	(Gls)
2018–2020	Acassuso	16	(0)
2022–2023	Fénix	13	(0)
2023–2025	Deportivo Merlo	49	(3)
2025–	Temperley	35	(1)
- * Club domestic league appearances and goals as of 17:41, 20 April 2026 (UTC)

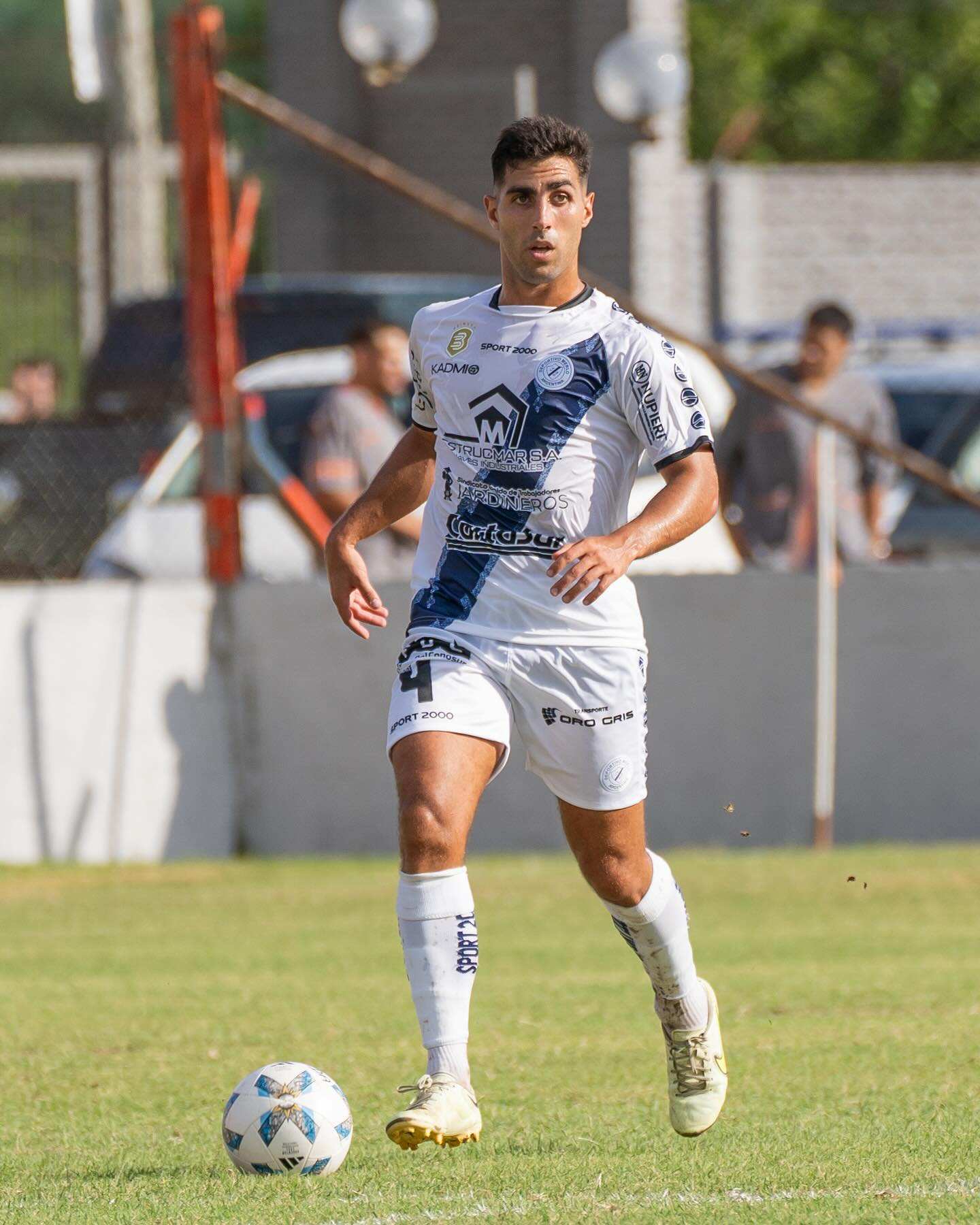

Lorenzo Monti Azpiazu (born 2 March 1998) is an Argentine professional footballer who plays as a midfielder for Temperley.

== Career ==
Monti started his professional career with Acassuso. Rodolfo Della Picca promoted the midfielder into their senior set-up, with his debut arriving in a Primera B Metropolitana draw with San Miguel on 23 October 2018. He was substituted on in that fixture, as he was a further three times in 2018–19 before he received his first start in the succeeding February against Atlanta.

== Personal life ==
Monti's brother, Rafael, is a footballer; he also played in the Acassuso youth system

== Career statistics ==
As of 25 April 2019.

Appearances and goals by club, season and competition
Club	Season	League			Cup		League Cup		Continental		Other		Total	
Club	Season	Division	Apps	Goals	Apps	Goals	Apps	Goals	Apps	Goals	Apps	Goals	Apps	Goals
Acassuso	2018–19	Primera B Metropolitana	9	0	1	0	—		—		0	0	10	0
Career total			9	0	1	0	—		—		0	0	10	0
