= Dixon Rentería =

Colombian footballer (born 1995)

Personal information
- Full name: Dixon Stiven Rentería Mosquera
- Date of birth: 24 September 1995 (age 31)
- Place of birth: El Retorno, Colombia
- Height: 1.80 m (5 ft 11 in)
- Position: Centre-back

Team information
- Current team: San Miguel

Youth career
- 2014–2015: Santa Fe

Senior career*
Years	Team	Apps	(Gls)
2015–2024	Santa Fe	22	(1)
2015	→ Expreso Rojo (loan)	26	(2)
2016	→ Llaneros (loan)	18	(2)
2017–2019	→ Unión Magdalena (loan)	63	(4)
2021	→ Central Córdoba SdE (loan)	14	(0)
2022	→ Atlético Huila (loan)	10	(0)
2022–2023	→ San Miguel (loan)	44	(1)
2024–	San Miguel	29	(0)
- * Club domestic league appearances and goals as of 17:55, 5 May 2026 (UTC)

Dixon Stiven Rentería Mosquera (born 24 September 1995) is a Colombian professional footballer who plays as a centre-back for San Miguel.

== Career ==
Rentería joined Santa Fe's ranks in 2014. In 2015, the centre-back was loaned to Expreso Rojo. He made his senior debut in a home defeat to Deportes Quindío on 28 February in Categoría Primera B. Rentería scored his first career goal on 3 May during a 5–1 away loss to Deportivo Pereira, which preceded him netting a brace in a Copa Colombia group stage encounter on home soil with Bogotá on 6 May. Another goal arrived on 21 May away against América de Cali. He made thirty appearances in total for Expreso Rojo. Rentería returned to Santa Fe at the end of 2015, though would immediately leave on loan again.

Ahead of January 2016, Rentería completed a loan move back to Categoría Primera B with Llaneros. Goals followed against Deportes Quindío and Orsomarso across twenty-two matches in league and cup. 2017 saw Rentería pen temporary terms with Unión Magdalena. He remained for both 2017 and 2018 to score twice in each campaign, doing so for the fourth year in a row; he was also sent off three times in that period, having received a red card once each whilst with Expreso Rojo and Llaneros. Unión Magdalena won promotion at the end of 2018, as he then featured five times in Categoría Primera A for them.

Rentería went back to Santa Fe midway through 2019, as he made his debut for the club on 11 August in a goalless draw at home to Patriotas. His first goal for El Cardenal came on 9 March 2020 versus Atlético Nacional. On 1 February 2021, Rentería headed abroad as he was loaned to Argentina with Primera División side Central Córdoba. He debuted in a Copa de la Liga Profesional win away to Atlético Tucumán on 22 February.

At the end of December 2021, Rentería joined Atlético Huila.

== Style of play ==
Rentería is primarily a centre-back, though he did play as a centre-forward for Expreso Rojo and as a right-back for Llaneros.

== Career statistics ==
As of 10 March 2021.

Appearances and goals by club, season and competition
Club	Season	League			Cup		League Cup		Continental		Other		Total	
Club	Season	Division	Apps	Goals	Apps	Goals	Apps	Goals	Apps	Goals	Apps	Goals	Apps	Goals
Santa Fe	2015	Categoría Primera A	0	0	0	0	—		0	0	0	0	0	0
Santa Fe	2016	Categoría Primera A	0	0	0	0	—		0	0	0	0	0	0
Santa Fe	2017	Categoría Primera A	0	0	0	0	—		0	0	0	0	0	0
Santa Fe	2018	Categoría Primera A	0	0	0	0	—		0	0	0	0	0	0
Santa Fe	2019	Categoría Primera A	10	0	0	0	—		—		0	0	10	0
Santa Fe	2020	Categoría Primera A	12	1	2	0	—		—		0	0	14	1
Santa Fe	2021	Categoría Primera A	0	0	0	0	—		0	0	0	0	0	0
Santa Fe	Total		22	1	2	0	—		0	0	0	0	24	1
Expreso Rojo (loan)	2015	Categoría Primera B	26	2	4	2	—		—		0	0	30	4
Llaneros (loan)	2016	Categoría Primera B	18	2	4	0	—		—		0	0	22	2
Unión Magdalena (loan)	2017	Categoría Primera B	26	2	7	0	—		—		0	0	33	2
Unión Magdalena (loan)	2018	Categoría Primera B	32	2	1	0	—		—		0	0	33	2
Unión Magdalena (loan)	2019	Categoría Primera A	5	0	5	0	—		—		0	0	10	0
Unión Magdalena (loan)	Total		63	4	13	0	—		—		0	0	76	4
Central Córdoba (loan)	2021 (Note: Soccerway counts Copa de la Liga Profesional appearances as league appearances.)	Primera División	3	0	0	0	—		—		0	0	3	0
Career total			132	9	23	2	—		0	0	0	0	155	11
