= Felipe Coronel =

Argentine footballer

Personal information
- Full name: Felipe Coronel
- Date of birth: 3 September 2001 (age 25)
- Place of birth: Rosario, Argentina
- Height: 1.79 m (5 ft 10 in)
- Position: Defender

Team information
- Current team: San Miguel

Youth career
- 2014–2021: Newell's Old Boys

Senior career*
Years	Team	Apps	(Gls)
2021–2022	Newell's Old Boys	0	(0)
2022–2024	Deportivo Maipú	55	(0)
2025	San Luis	24	(0)
2026–	San Miguel	9	(0)
- * Club domestic league appearances and goals as of 17:53, 5 May 2026 (UTC)

Felipe Coronel (born 3 September 2001) is an Argentine footballer who plays as a defender for San Miguel.

== Club career ==
Born in Rosario, Argentina, Coronel started his career with Newell's Old Boys. In June 2022, he signed with Deportivo Maipú in the Primera Nacional. He spent two seasons more with them until December 2024.

In 2025, Coronel moved to Chile and signed with San Luis de Quillota.

== Personal life ==
At the same time Coronel played for Deportivo Maipú, he studied economics for a year.
