= Remedios de Escalada =

City in Buenos Aires Province, Argentina

- City
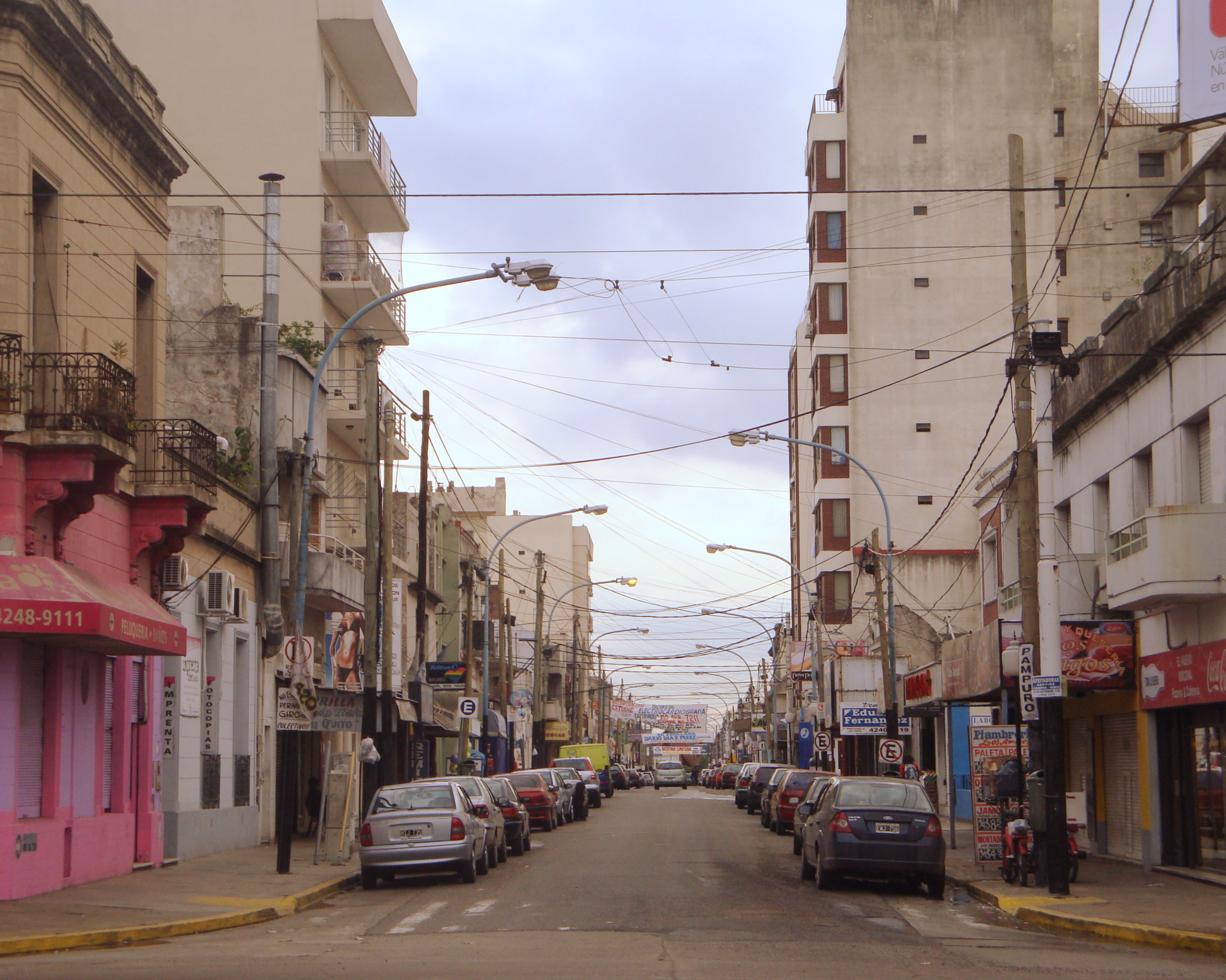

- Location in Greater Buenos Aires
- Coordinates: 34°43′S 58°24′W
- Argentina: Argentina
- Province: Buenos Aires
- Partido: Lanús
- Elevation: 11 m (36 ft)

Population (2001 census [INDEC])
  - Total: 81,465
  - Density: 8,807/km^{2} (22,810/sq mi)
- CPA Base: B 1826
- Area code: +54 11

Remedios de Escalada is a city located in Buenos Aires Province, Argentina, within Lanús Partido, Gran Buenos Aires. It covers an area of 9.95 km^{2} and the population was 81,465 in 2001; the demonym for its inhabitants is "escaladense."

== History ==
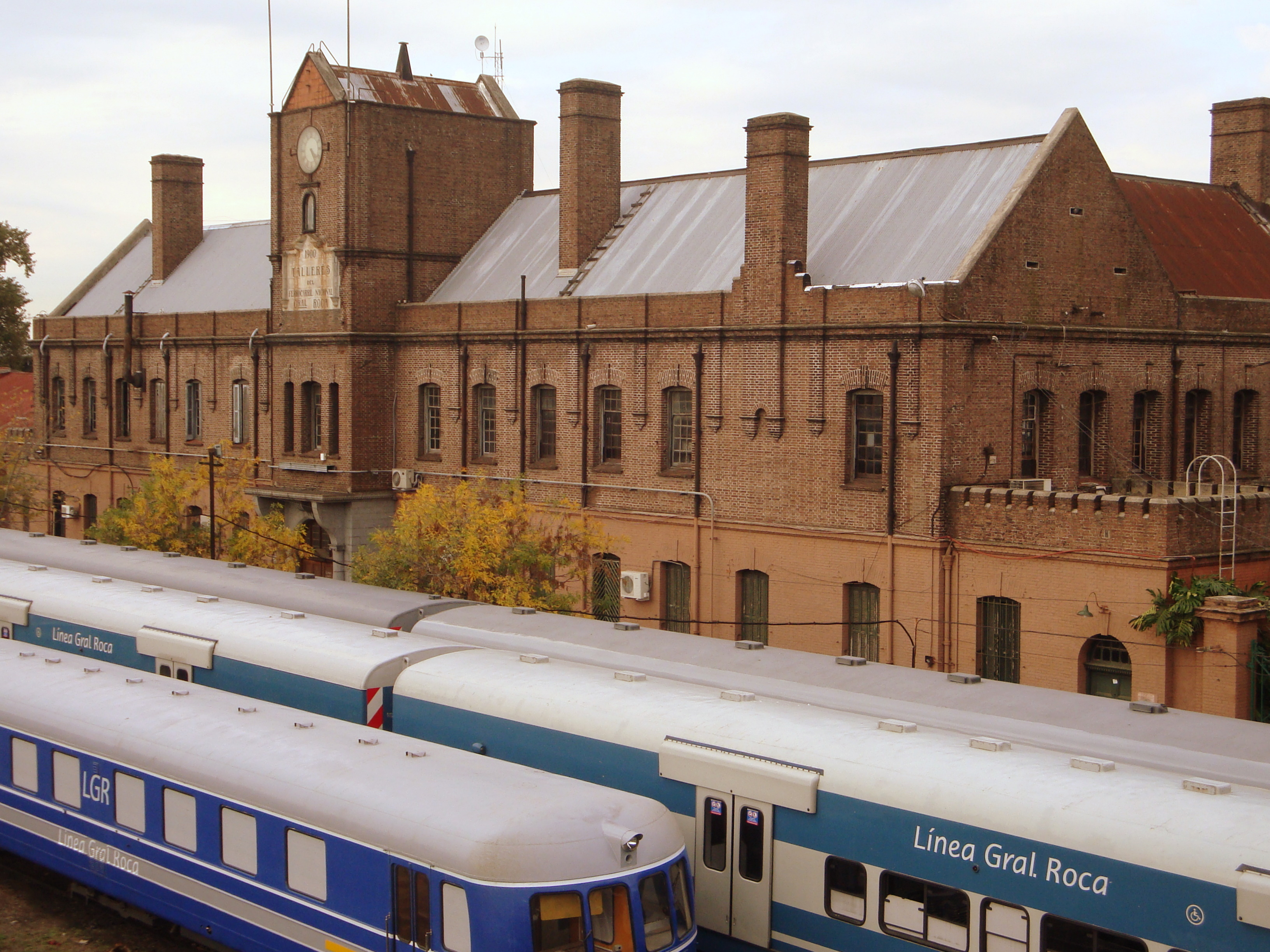
The Roca Line coach yard, part of installations opened in 1890.

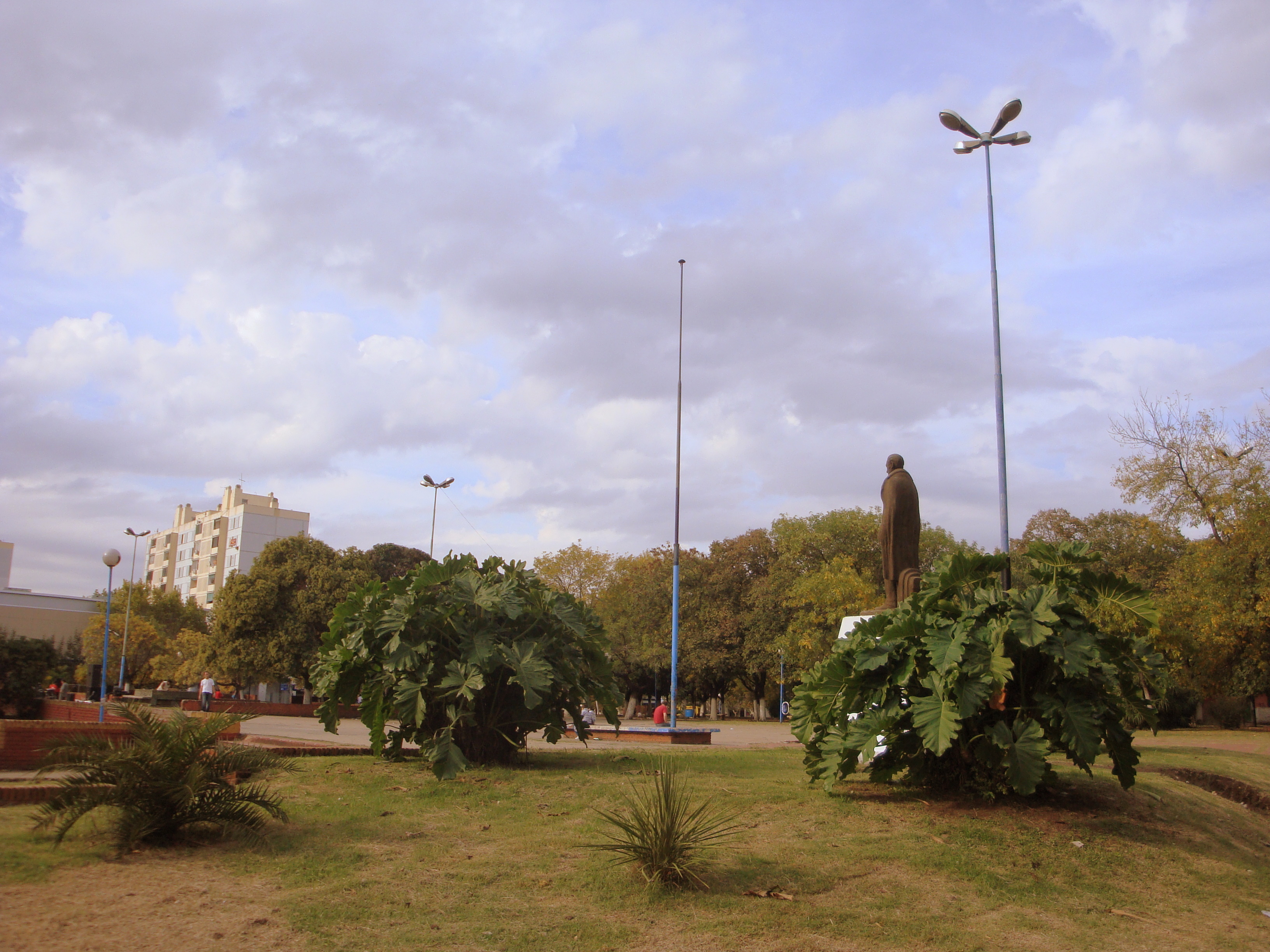
Mariano Moreno square

The town was first established by Agustín Eguren as Edén Argentino ("Argentine Eden"), a bedroom community, in 1873. Its population remained in the few hundreds until, in 1890, the Buenos Aires Great Southern Railway inaugurated a rail yard in the adjoining Villa Galíndez, to the east; La Fraternidad, one of Argentina's first and oldest trade unions, was founded by workers at the site in 1887. Further such installations opened by Eliseo Ramírez and the Ramírez de Lafuente family in 1901 made the area a prime rail operations hub, and the Great Southern inaugurated its first commuter station there in 1902.

The Club Atlético Talleres de Remedios de Escalada, the town's first football club, was established in 1906, and plays in the lower leagues of Argentine football. The town became home to a sizable community of Italian Argentines in the subsequent years, and prominent among these was Luis Máspero, who operated one of the country's largest hat factories, and Víctor Marangoni, owner of an important metalworks establishment; the Italian Mutual Insurance and Assistance Company was established here in 1913.

A number of important cooperatives, notably El Hogar Argentino (1911) and La Internacional (1914), opened in the town during that era, as did La Idea, a news daily, in 1915, and the Unión Ferroviaria, a nationally prominent yellow union organized as a counterweight to the intransigent La Fraternidad, in 1921. The Roman Catholic Parish of Nuestra Señora de los Remedios ("Our Lady of Remedies") was consecrated in 1924, and in 1933, Villa Galíndez and the Argentine Eden were incorporated as Remedios de Escalada (in honor of María de los Remedios de Escalada, wife of the leader of the Argentine War of Independence, General José de San Martín).

Remedios de Escalada was formally declared a city by the Buenos Aires Province Legislature in 1974. The city later suffered from the effects of a failed plan during the 1976-83 dictatorship to expand the General Paz Freeway from the Villa Riachuelo ward in Buenos Aires to the city of Avellaneda; never completed, the demolitions resulting from the project left an extensive swath along the city of empty lots which, in many cases, were not adequately reurbanized. The National University of Lanús, one of the smaller national universities, was established here in 1995.

== Notable people ==
- Gonzalo Baglivo (born 1996), footballer
- Franco Colela (born 1995), footballer
- Bautista Delguy (born 1997), rugby union player who represented the Argentina national sevens team
- Hugo Donato (born 1974), footballer and manager
- Santiago Echeverría (born 1990), footballer
- Graciela Giannettasio (1950–2022), National Deputy of Buenos Aires Province and vice governor of Buenos Aires Province
- Matías Linas (born 1993), footballer
- Juan Perinetti (1891–1957), footballer who represented the Argentina national team
- Rodrigo Schlegel (born 1997), footballer
- Carlos Wilson (1912–1996), footballer who represented the Argentina national team
