= Gabriel Rinaldi =

Argentine football manager

Personal information
- Full name: Gabriel Osvaldo Rinaldi
- Date of birth: 17 December 1970 (age 55)
- Place of birth: Buenos Aires, Argentina
- Position: Centre back

Team information
- Current team: Huracán (youth manager)

Youth career
- Huracán

Senior career*
| Years | Team | Apps | (Gls) |
| 1992–1995 | Huracán | 42 | (1) |
| 1995–1996 | Tigre | | |
| 1996–1998 | San Telmo | 38 | (2) |
| 1998–1999 | Estudiantes de Mérida | | |

Managerial career
- San Telmo (youth)
- Deportivo Español (youth)
- 2008–2014: Huracán (youth)
- 2012: Huracán (interim)
- 2013: Huracán (interim)
- 2014–2015: Huracán (assistant)
- 2019: Club La Catedral (assistant)
- 2019: Sacachispas
- 2021–: Huracán (youth)
- 2021: Huracán (interim)
- * Club domestic league appearances and goals

Gabriel Osvaldo Rinaldi (born 17 December 1970) is an Argentine football manager and former player who played as a central defender. He is the current manager of Huracán's youth setup.

== Playing career ==
Born in Buenos Aires, Rinaldi made his senior debut with his hometown side Huracán in 1992. He left the club in 1995 after one goal in 45 matches, and subsequently represented local sides Tigre and San Telmo.

In 1998, after one year at Venezuela's Estudiantes de Mérida, Rinaldi retired.

== Managerial career ==
After retiring, Rinaldi obtained a manager's licence in 2005. He then worked at the youth categories of his former side San Telmo and Deportivo Español before returning to Huracán in 2008.

Rinaldi was named interim manager of Huracán in September 2012, after the dismissal of Héctor Rivoira. He returned to his previous duties after the appointment of Juan Manuel Llop, but was again interim after Llop was sacked in April 2013.

Rinaldi was sacked by the Globo on 2 July 2015. He was subsequently an assistant manager of Club La Catedral before being appointed at the helm of Sacachispas on 16 September 2019.

Rinaldi resigned from Sacachispas on 25 November 2019, and returned to Huracán on 9 March 2021, as a manager of the youth sides. Shortly after arriving, he was named interim manager along with Gastón Casas, after the departure of Israel Damonte.
