= List of transfers of Segunda División – 2005–06 season =

This is a list of Spanish football transfers for the 2005–06 Segunda División season. Transfers are only allowed in limited transfer windows in summer and winter.

== Albacete Balompie ==
In:

- (Spain) Raúl Molina - On Loan From Rayo Vallecano
- (Spain) Corona - On Loan From Real Zaragoza
- (Spain) Juanlu - On Loan From Real Betis
- (Spain) David Sanchez - Signed From FC Barcelona
- (Spain) Parri - Signed From Valencia CF
- (Spain) Sanzol - Signed From CA Osasuna
- (Spain) Pirri - Signed From Real Zaragoza
- (Spain) Mingo - Signed From Betis
- (Spain) Mario Bermejo - Signed From - Racing de Ferrol
- (Spain) Rubén Martín - Signed From Atletico de Madrid B
- (Spain) David Bauzá - Signed From Sporting de Gijón
- (Spain) David Cañas - Signed From Salamanca
- (Spain) Garrido - Signed From Valencia CF
- (Spain) Casto - Signed From Albacete Balompie B
- (Spain) Albert Cano - Signed From Albacete Balompie B
- (Spain) Pablo - Signed From Albacete Balompie B
- (Spain) Cesar Diaz - Signed From Albacete Balompie B
- (Spain) Gato - Signed From Albacete Balompie B
- (Spain) Basti - Return From AD Ceuta
- (Spain) Luismi - Return From Murcia
- (Spain) Camaño - Return From RCD Mallorca B
- (Spain) Javier Martinez - Return From Atletico de Madrid B
- (Spain) Rubén Reyes - Return From Pontevedra
- (Spain) Catalá - Return From Lleida
- (Spain) Santamaria - On Loan From FC Barcelona
- (Spain) Aranda - On Loan To Sevilla FC

Out:

- (Chile) (Spain) Mark Gonzalez - Transferred To Real Sociedad
- (Uruguay) (Italy) Pacheco - On Loan To Deportivo Alaves
- (Spain) Rubén Reyes - Transferred To Pontevedra CF
- (Spain) Elías - On Loan To FC Cartagena
- (Spain) Iván Díaz - On Loan To Sabadell
- (Spain) Rubén - Return To Real Madrid
- (Spain) Rubén Castro - Return To Deportivo
- (Spain) Momo - Return To Deportivo
- (Spain) Redondo - Return To Valencia
- (Spain) Valbuena - Return To Zaragoza
- (Spain) Gaspar - Transferred To Deportivo Alaves
- (Spain) Francisco - Transferred To UD Almeria
- (Spain) Jaime - Transferred To Racing de Ferrol
- (Spain) Agus - Transferred To Real Madrid
- (Brazil) (Italy) Cacá - Transferred To Alicante
- (Belgium) (European Union) Gaspercic - Transferred To KVC Westerlo
- (Spain) Pindado - Transferred To Las Palmas
- (Uruguay) Horacio Peralta - Transferred To CR Flamengo
- (Uruguay) Olivera - Transferred To Defensor Sporting
- (Spain) Oscar Montiel - Retired
- (France) (European Union) Viaud - Retired

== UD Almeria ==
In:

- (Spain) Velamazán - Signed From RCD Espanyol
- (Spain) Jonathan Soriano - On Loan From RCD Espanyol
- (Nigeria) Uche - Signed From Wisła Kraków
- (Spain) Francisco - Signed From Albacete Balompié
- (Uruguay) (Spain) Varela - Signed From SD Eibar
- (Spain) Bermudo - Signed From CD Tenerife
- (Spain) David Hernández - Signed From Arenas de Armilla
- (Spain) Crusat - Signed From UE Lleida
- (Spain) Soriano - Signed From Real Zaragoza
- (Paraguay) (Italy) Barreto - Signed From Cerro Porteño
- (Spain) Cisma - On Loan From Atlético de Madrid
- (Spain) Carlos Sánchez - On Loan From Real Madrid
- (Spain) Carlos García - On Loan From RCD Espanyol

Out:

- (Spain) Esteban - Transferred To Córdoba CF
- (Spain) David Hernández - On Loan To UD Mérida
- (Spain) Sisco - Transferred To Burgos CF
- (Argentina) (Italy) Nanni - Transferred To Siena
- (Spain) Iban Espadas - Transferred To Ciudad de Murcia
- (Spain) Sorroche - Transferred To Granada CF
- (Spain) Isaac - Transferred - To Lorca Deportiva CF
- (Spain) Galán - Transferred To Algeciras CF
- (France) (European Union) Sahnoun - Transferred To Brest
- (Peru) (Italy) Rebosio - Transferred To Sporting Cristal
- (Spain) Lambea - Transferred To Zalla UC
- (Paraguay) (Spain) Adorno - Transferred To CD Baza
- (Argentina) (Spain) Leonel Rios - Transferred To Arsenal de Sarandí
- (Argentina) (Italy) Christian Díaz - Transferred To CF Ciudad de Murcia
- (Brazil) (Italy) Jamelli - Transferred To Clube Atlético Mineiro
- (Spain) Carlos Cano - Retired

== CD Castellon ==
In:

- (Argentina) Tabares - Signed From Arsenal de Saraní
- (Spain) Aurelio - On Loan From Xerez CD
- (Japan) Fukuda - Signed From Irapuato FC
- (Spain) Fredi - Signed From Cadiz CF
- (Spain) Ordóñez - Signed From Benidorm
- (Spain) Epitié - Signed From Alaves
- (Spain) Segovia - Signed From Alaves B
- (Spain) Mora - Signed From FC Barcelona B
- (Spain) Zamora - Signed From Girona
- (Spain) Mario - Signed From Girona
- (Spain) Raúl Sanchez - Signed From UD Salamanca
- (Spain) Dani Ruiz - Signed From Leganes
- (Spain) Pardo - Signed From Leganes
- (Spain) Pedro Hernandez - Signed From Ciudad de Murcia
- (Spain) Zafra - Signed From Conquense
- (Spain) Xavi Moré - Signed From Real Valladolid
- (Spain) Miguel Ángel - On Loan From Cadiz CF
- (Spain) Jonan García - On Loan From Athletic de Bilbao

Out:

- (Spain) Marcos Estruch - Transferred To Alicante CF
- (Spain) Dani Ruiz - Transferred To CD Cobeña
- (Spain) Javi Fernández - On Loan To Algeciras CF
- (Spain) Fredi - Transferred To UD Las Palmas
- (Spain) Ordóñez - Transferred To CD Alcoyano
- (Spain) Xavi Molist - Transferred To FC Cartagena
- (Spain) Orlando - Transferred To FC Cartagena
- (Spain) Natalio - Transferred To FC Cartagena
- (Spain) Espeleta - Transferred To Burgos CF
- (Spain) Sambruno - Transferred To Leganes CF
- (Spain) Javi Hernandez - Transferred To Benidorm
- (Spain) Julen Gonzalo - Transferred To SD Eibar
- (Spain) Manu Busto - Transferred - To Pontevedra CF
- (Spain) Rondo - Transferred To Algeciras CF
- (Spain) Eloy Jiménez - Retired

== Ciudad de Murcia ==
In:

- (Spain) Paco Esteban - On Loan From Málaga CF
- (Togo) (France) Assémoassa - Signed From Clermont Foot
- (Spain) Ángel - Signed From Deportivo Alavés
- (Spain) Jaime - Signed From AD Ceuta
- (Venezuela) (Spain) Jonay - Signed From Córdoba CF
- (Spain) Diego Alegre - Signed From Sporting de Gijón
- (Argentina) (Spain) Christian Díaz - Signed From Sporting de Gijón
- (Spain) Iban Espadas - Signed From Real Zaragoza
- (Spain) Guerra - Signed From Real Zaragoza B
- (Spain) Raúl Medina - On Loan From Atlético de Madrid
- (Cameroon) Kome - On Loan From RCD Mallorca
- (Sweden) (European Union) Goitom - On Loan From Udinese
- (Spain) Mané - On Loan From Atlético de Madrid
- (Spain) Sergio Torres - On Loan From Atlético de Madrid
- (Spain) David Rodríguez - On Loan From Atlético de Madrid
- (Spain) Piti - On Loan From Real Zaragoza

Out:

- (Spain) David Rodríguez - On Loan To UD Las Palmas
- Córdoba - Transferred To Colombia
- (Spain) Dani Bautista - Return To Sevilla FC
- (Spain) Toni González - Return To RCD Mallorca
- (Spain) Güiza - Transferred To Getafe FC
- (Spain) Godino - Transferred To UE Sant Andreu
- (Spain) Espejo - Transferred To CD Eldense
- (Spain) Pedro - Transferred To CD Castellón
- (Spain) Armada - Transferred To Algeciras CF
- (Argentina) (Italy) Luciano - Transferred To Terrassa FC
- (Spain) Aguilar - Transferred To Lorca Deportiva CF
- (Spain) Espejo - Transferred To CD Eldense
- (Peru) (Spain) Merino - Transferred To Real Murcia CF
- (Spain) Miki - Transferred To CD Villanueva de Córdoba
- (Argentina) Leo Diaz - Transferred To Olímpo de Bahía Blanca
- (Brazil) João Paulo - Transferred To BSC Young Boys
- (Spain) Pablo - Retired
- (Portugal) (European Union) Almeida - To Portimonense S.C.

== SD Eibar ==
In:

- (Spain) Susaeta - On Loan From Real Sociedad
- (Spain) Domínguez - On Loan From Real Sociedad
- (Spain) Rafa - Signed From Real Valladolid B
- (Uruguay) Iván - Signed From Sud America
- (Spain) Julen Gonzalo - Signed From CD Castellon
- (Spain) Azkoitia - Signed From Elche CF
- (Spain) Jaime - Signed From UD Salamanca
- (Spain) Nené - Signed From Terrassa FC
- (Spain) Lezaun - Signed From UE Lleida
- (Spain) Borrell - Signed From UE Lleida
- (Spain) Garai - Signed From CD Tenerife
- (Spain) Asensio - Signed From Alicante CF
- (Spain) Mayrata - Signed From Levante B
- (Spain) Etxeberria - Signed From Cultural Leonesa
- (Spain) Markel - On Loan From Real Sociedad
- (Spain) Zubikarai - On Loan From Real Sociedad
- (Spain) Moya - On Loan From Athletic de Bilbao
- (Spain) Cesar - On Loan From Athletic de Bilbao
- (Spain) Arriaga - On Loan From Athletic de Bilbao
- (Spain) Solabarrieta - On Loan From Athletic de Bilbao

Out:

- (Spain) Jon Moya - Transferred To Terrassa CF
- (Spain) Ion Goñi - On Loan To Barakaldo CF
- (Spain) Arregui - On Loan To Rayo Vallecano
- (Spain) Silva - Return To Valencia CF
- (Spain) Llorente - Return To Real Sociedad
- (Spain) Oskitz - Return To Real Sociedad
- (Spain) Cifuentes - Return To Real Sociedad
- (Spain) Garitano - Return To Real Sociedad
- (Colombia) Miled - Return To Real Sociedad
- (Spain) Iraizoz - Return To RCD Espanyol
- (Spain) Hurtado - Return To RCD Espanyol
- (Spain) Pascual - Return To Real Racing B
- (Spain) Quique Mateo - Transferred To Hercules CF
- (Uruguay) (Spain) Varela - Transferred To UD Almeria
- (Spain) Corredoira - Transferred To CD Numancia
- (Spain) Burgueña - Transferred To Cultural Leonesa
- (Spain) Cabrejo - Transferred To FC Cartagena
- (Spain) Karmona - Retired

== Polideportivo Ejido ==
In:

- (Spain) Soldevilla - Signed From RCD Espanyol
- (Spain) Tena - Signed From Villarreal CF
- (Spain) Keko - Signed From CD Tenerife
- (Spain) Moreno - Signed From Recreativo de Huelva
- (Spain) Bello Amigo - Signed From Racing de Ferrol
- (Spain) Curro Vacas - Signed From Racing de Ferrol
- (Spain) Kiko - Signed From Alaves
- (Spain) Juanma - Signed From Rayo Vallecano
- (Spain) Cristian - Signed From Terrassa FC
- (Spain) Óscar Rodriguez - Signed From Sevilla FC
- (Spain) López Ramos - Signed From Córdoba CF
- (Spain) Marcos Navas - On Loan From Sevilla FC

Out:

- (Spain) Canito - Transferred To Real Jaén
- (Spain) Salva Sevila - On Loan To Sevilla B
- (Spain) Carlos Sánchez - Return To Real Madrid
- (Spain) Carlos García - Return To RCD Espanyol
- (Spain) Romero - Return To Atlético de Madrid
- (Spain) Jacobo - Return To Atlético de Madrid
- (Spain) Corona - Return To Real Zaragoza
- (Spain) Enguix - Return To Sporting de Gijón
- (Spain) Aira - Transferred To Racing de Ferrol
- (Spain) Sierra - Transferred - To CD Linares
- (Spain) Sabino - Transferred - To FC Cartagena
- (Spain) Pineda - Transferred - To Racing de Ferrol
- (Spain) Urbano - Transferred - To Hércules CF
- (Spain) Paco García - Transferred - To Águilas CF

== Elche CF ==
In:

- (Spain) Fernando Niño - Signed From RCD Mallorca
- (Spain) Katxorro - Signed From Xerez CD
- (Spain) Raúl Martín - Signed From CD Tenerife
- (France) (European Union) Toledo - Signed From Real Zaragoza B
- (Spain) Mario - Signed From Rayo Vallecano
- (Spain) Alberto - Signed From Getafe CF
- (Spain) Quique Medina - Signed From Getafe CF
- (Spain) Gomis - Return From Rayo Vallecano

Out:

- (Poland) (European Union) Frankowski - Transferred To Wolverhampton Wanderers
- (Spain) Moisés - Transferred To Hercules CF
- (France) (European Union) Darmon - Transferred To Aguilas CF
- (Serbia and Montenegro) Tasevski - Transferred To Benidorm
- (Spain) Unai Vergara - Transferred To UE Lleida
- (Spain) Turiel - Transferred To Hercules CF
- (Spain) Azkoitia - Transferred To SD Eibar
- (Argentina) (Spain) Zárate - Transferred To Deportivo Morón
- (Spain) Kiko Torres - Retired
- (Spain) Aizkorreta - Retired
- (Spain) Otero - Retired

== Racing de Ferrol ==
In:

- (France) (European Union) Gallon - Signed From Clermont Foot
- (Spain) Isaac On Loan From Celta de Vigo
- (Spain) Joselito - On Loan From Recreativo de Huelva
- (Guatemala) (Italy) Pezzarossi - On Loan From Comunicaciones
- (Spain) Jonathan Martín - Signed From Cultural Leonesa
- (Spain) Nacho - Signed From Deportivo Alaves
- (Spain) Juan Carlos - Signed From Terrassa FC
- (Spain) Pineda - Signed From Polideportivo Ejido
- (Spain) Aira - Signed From Polideportivo Ejido
- (France) (European Union) Bouchard - Signed From Clermont Foot
- (France) (European Union) Beranger - Signed From Cannes
- (Morocco) (France) Baha - Signed From Sporting Braga
- (Spain) Arnal - Signed From UE Lleida
- (Spain) Manolo - Signed From Celta de Vigo
- (Spain) Carlocho - Signed From Atletico Arteixo
- (Spain) Jaime - Signed From Albacete Balompie
- (Spain) Héctor - On Loan From RCD Espanyol
- (Spain) Ibón Pérez - On Loan From Athletic de Bilbao B
- (Spain) Jorge Rodríguez - On Loan From Celta de Vigo

Out

- (Spain) Arnal - Transferred To Cordoba CF
- (Spain) Arrieta - Transferred To Logroñes CF
- (Spain) Pina - On Loan To Malaga B
- (Spain) Tena - Return To Villarreal CF
- (Spain) Escalona - Return To Athletic de Bilbao
- (Spain) David Franch - Transferred To AD Ceuta
- (Spain) Jaio - Transferred To Gimnàstic de Tarragona
- (Spain) Bello Amigo - Transferred To Polideportivo Ejido
- (Spain) Meca - Transferred To Real Jaen
- (Spain) Bayarri - Transferred To Talavera CF
- (Spain) Moreno - Transferred To CF Badalona
- (Spain) Bermejo - Transferred To Albacete Balompie
- (Spain) Sueiro - Transferred To CD Ourense
- (Spain) Curro Vacas - Transferred To Polideportivo Ejido
- (France) (European Union) Vosalho - Transferred To Dijon FC
- (Spain) Sito - Transferred To Ipswich Town FC
- (France) (European Union) Darmon - Transferred To Aguilas CF
- (Brazil) Flavio - Retired
- (Spain) Alberto - Retired

== Sporting de Gijon ==
Not available

== Gimnàstic de Tarragona ==
In:

- (Argentina) (Italy) Lupidio - Signed From Hércules CF
- (Spain) Rubén - Signed From CD Badajoz
- (Spain) Morales - Signed From RCD Espanyol
- (Spain) Nano - Signed From UD Marbella
- (Nigeria) Ekpoki - Signed From Olimpija Ljubliana
- (Spain) Merino - Signed From CD Numancia
- (Spain) Miguel Pérez - Signed From CD Numancia
- (Spain) Álex Pérez - Signed From Real Madrid
- (Spain) Iván Romero - Signed From Atletico de Madrid
- (Spain) Álvaro Iglesias - Signed From CD Tenerife
- (Spain) Óscar Álvarez - Signed From CD Tenerife
- (Spain) Jaio - Signed From Racing de Ferrol
- (Spain) Irurzun - Signed From Sporting de Gijón
- (Spain) Diego Reyes - Signed From AD Ceuta
- (Spain) Llera - Signed From Alicante CF
- (Spain) Ruz - On Loan From Valencia CF

Out:

- (Spain) Iván Romero - Transferred To Real Jaén
- (Spain) Valencia - Transferred To Racing de Santander
- (Spain) Ibón Begoña - transferred To Deportivo Alavés
- (Spain) Carrión - Transferred To Córdoba CF
- (Spain) Ñoño - On Loan To Sant Andreu
- (Spain) Tortolero - Return To FC Barcelona
- (Spain) Angulo - Return To Athletic de Bilbao
- (Spain) David Medina - transferred To Sabadell
- (Spain) Iván Ania - transferred To Cádiz CF
- (Spain) Felip - transferred To UD Salamanca
- (Spain) Lusarreta - transferred To Real Oviedo
- (Spain) Sergio Francisco transferred - To Real Unión
- (Spain) Vaqueriza - transferred Retired
- (Spain) Fernando - transferred To Cultural y Deportiva Leonesa

== Hercules CF ==
Not available

== Recreativo de Huelva ==
In:

- (Spain) Toño - On Loan From Racing de Santander
- (Ecuador) Valencia - On Loan From Villarreal CF
- (Spain) Barber - Signed From Conquense
- (Spain) (Equatorial Guinea) Juvenal - Signed From Deportivo Alaves
- (Spain) Bouzón - On Loan From Celta de Vigo
- (Spain) Dani Bautista - On Loan From Sevilla FC

Out

- (Spain) Loren - Transferred To UD Marbella
- (Spain) Manu del Moral - Return To Atletico de Madrid
- (Spain) Azkorra - Return To Athletic de Bilbao
- (Spain) Verza - Return To Villarreal CF
- (Spain) Moreno - Transferred To Polideportivo Ejido
- (Portugal) (European Union) Mario Silva - Transferred To Cadiz CF

== Levante UD ==
In:

- (Spain) Javi Rodríguez - Signed From Pontevedra CF
- (Spain) Nagore - Signed From RCD Mallorca
- (Ghana) (Netherlands) Riga - Signed From Sparta de Rotterdam
- (France) (European Union) Courtois - Signed From Istres
- (Spain) Carmelo - Signed From UD Las Palmas
- (Brazil) Lombardi - Signed From Paraná
- (Spain) Tello - Signed From Real Madrid B

Out

- (Spain) Rivera - Transferred To Real Betis
- (Spain) Mora - Transferred To Valencia CF
- (Spain) Pinillos - Transferred To Racing de Santander
- (Spain) Jofre - Transferred To RCD Espanyol
- (Spain) Sergio Garcia - Transferred To Real Zaragoza
- (Switzerland) (Italy) Celestini - Transferred To Getafe CF

== CD Numancia ==
In:

- (Spain) Ibon Gutiérrez - On Loan From Athletic de Bilbao
- (Colombia) Hamilton - Signed From Deportivo Cali
- (Spain) Tarantino - On Loan From Athletic de Bilbao
- (Argentina) (Italy) Montenegro - Signed From Pontevedra CF
- (Spain) Juan Pablo - Signed From Deportivo Alaves
- (Spain) Navas - Signed From Terrassa FC
- (Spain) Rubén López - Signed From Terrassa FC
- (Spain) Corredoira - Signed From SD Eibar
- (Spain) Del Pino - Signed From Xerez CD
- (Spain) Monteagudo - Signed From Xerez CD
- (Spain) Yanguas - Signed From Getafe CF
- (Spain) Azkorra - On Loan From Athletic de Bilbao
- (Spain) Pablo Niño - On Loan From Real Betis

Out

- (Spain) Monteagudo - Transferred To UD Las Palmas
- (Spain) Mario - On Loan To UD Las Palmas
- (Spain) Jordá - Transferred To Benidorm UD
- (Spain) Juanma - Transferred To UD Merida
- (Spain) Toché - Return To Atletico de Madrid
- (Spain) Tarantino - Return To Athletic de Bilbao
- (Spain) Ros - Return To FC Barcelona
- (Spain) Merino - Transferred To Gimnàstic de Tarragona
- (Spain) Miguel Perez - Transferred To Gimnàstic de Tarragona
- (Spain) Juanlu - Transferred To Real Betis
- (Spain) De Miguel - Transferred To Sabadell
- (France) (European Union) Pignol - Transferred To Real Murcia

== UE Lleida ==
In:

- (Spain) Camacho - Signed From Real Zaragoza
- (Spain) Juanlu - On Loan From Valencia CF
- (Brazil) Luiz Carlos - Signed From Paysandú
- (Croatia) Bilic - Signed From Cordoba CF
- (Spain) Unai - Signed From Elche CF
- (Spain) Ros - Signed From CD Numancia
- (Spain) Eneko - Signed From Rayo Vallecano
- (Spain) Carrillo - Signed From L’Hospitalet
- (Spain) Povedano - Signed From Ponferradina
- (Spain) Juanma Cruz - Signed From Sabadell
- (Spain) Jacobo - On Loan From Atletico de Madrid

Out

- (Spain) Lanzarote - On Loan To Atletico de Madrid B
- (Spain) Catalá - Return To Albacete Balompie
- (Spain) Ros - Return To FC Barcelona
- (Spain) Olalla - Transferred To Rayo Vallecano
- (Spain) Crusat - Transferred To UD Almeria
- (Spain) Lezaun - Transferred To SD Eibar

== Lorca Deportiva ==
In:

- (Spain) Marc Bertrán - On Loan From Cadiz CF
- (Spain) Isaac - Signed From UD Almeria
- (Spain) Aguilar - Signed From Ciudad de Murcia
- (Spain) Gorka García - Signed From Cordoba CF
- (Spain) Maldonado - Signed From AD Ceuta
- (Brazil) Alves - Signed From Pontevedra
- (Spain) Quintana - On Loan From Celta de Vigo
- (Argentina) (Spain) Sava - On Loan From Fulham
- (Spain) Velázquez - On Loan From Cadiz CF

Out

- (Spain) Castellanos - Transferred To Real Jaen
- (Spain) Toni Bernal - transferred To Motril
- (Spain) Rafa Moreno - transferred To Villanueva de Cordoba
- (Spain) Caballero - transferred To FC Cartagena
- (Spain) Gerard - transferred To Terrassa FC
- (Spain) Lezaun - transferred To SD Eibar
- (Spain) Gurrutxaga - transferred To Real Jaen
- (Spain) Pomar - transferred To Amurrio
- (Spain) Mesa - transferred To Alcoyano

== Real Madrid Castilla ==
In:

- (Spain) Rubén González Rocha - Return From Albacete Balompié
- (Spain) Agustín Garcia Iñiguez - Signed From Albacete Balompié
- (Spain) Álvaro Negredo Sánchez - Signed From Rayo Vallecano de Madrid
- (Spain) Óscar Díaz Gónzalez - Signed From AD Alcorcón
- (Brazil) Filipe Luís Kasmirski - Signed From Figueirense FC
- (Spain) Francisco Casilla Cortes - Promoted From Real Madrid C
- (Spain) Javier Angel Balboa Osa - Promoted From Real Madrid C
- (Spain) Borja Valero Iglesias - Promoted From Real Madrid C
- (Spain) Esteban Granero Molina - Promoted From Real Madrid C

Out:

- (Spain) Juan Olalla Fernández - On Loan To Rayo Vallecano de Madrid
- (Spain) Diego León Ayarza - On Loan To DCS Arminia Bielefeld
- (Spain) Juanfran - On Loan To RCD Espanyol
- (Spain) Alejandro Pérez Aracil - Transferred To Gimnàstic de Tarragona
- (Spain) Javier Paredes Arango - Transferred To Getafe CF
- (Spain) Roberto Trashorras Gayoso - Transferred To RCD Mallorca
- (Spain) Manuel Diego Tello Jorge - Transferred To Levante UD
- (Spain) Rubén Arroyo Lloret - Transferred To Universidad de Las Palmas
- (Spain) Victor Daniel Blanco Munoz - Transferred To Unión Deportiva Salamanca
- (Spain) Adrián Quintairos Bugallo - Transferred To Celta de Vigo B

== Real Murcia ==
In:

- (Greece) (European Union) Chalkias - Signed From Portsmouth FC
- (Uruguay) Salgueiro - On Loan From Danubio
- (Spain) Palacios - Signed From Rayo Vallecano

Out

- (Spain) Michel - Transferred To Rayo Vallecano
- (Argentina) (Spain) Fernández - Transferred To Cordoba CF
- (Argentina) (Spain) Olave - On Loan To River Plate

== CD Tenerife ==
Not Available

== Real Valladolid ==
In:

- (Spain) Pablo Amo - Signed From Deportivo de La Coruña
- (Spain) Pablo Casar - Signed From Racing de Santander

Out

- (Spain) Aduriz - Transferred To Athletic de Bilbao

== Xerez CD ==
In:

- (Spain) Pazos - Signed From AD Ceuta

Out

- (Spain) Aurelio - Transferred To CD Castellon
