= 2005–06 Segunda División =

75th season of the second-tier football league in Spain

Segunda División
- Season: 2005-06
- Champions: Recreativo Huelva
- Promoted: Recreativo; Nàstic; Levante UD
- Relegated: UE Lleida; Racing Ferrol; Málaga B Eibar
- Matches: 462
- Goals: 1,061 (2.3 per match)
- Top goalscorer: (Nigeria) Ikechukwu Uche (Spain) José Juan Luque

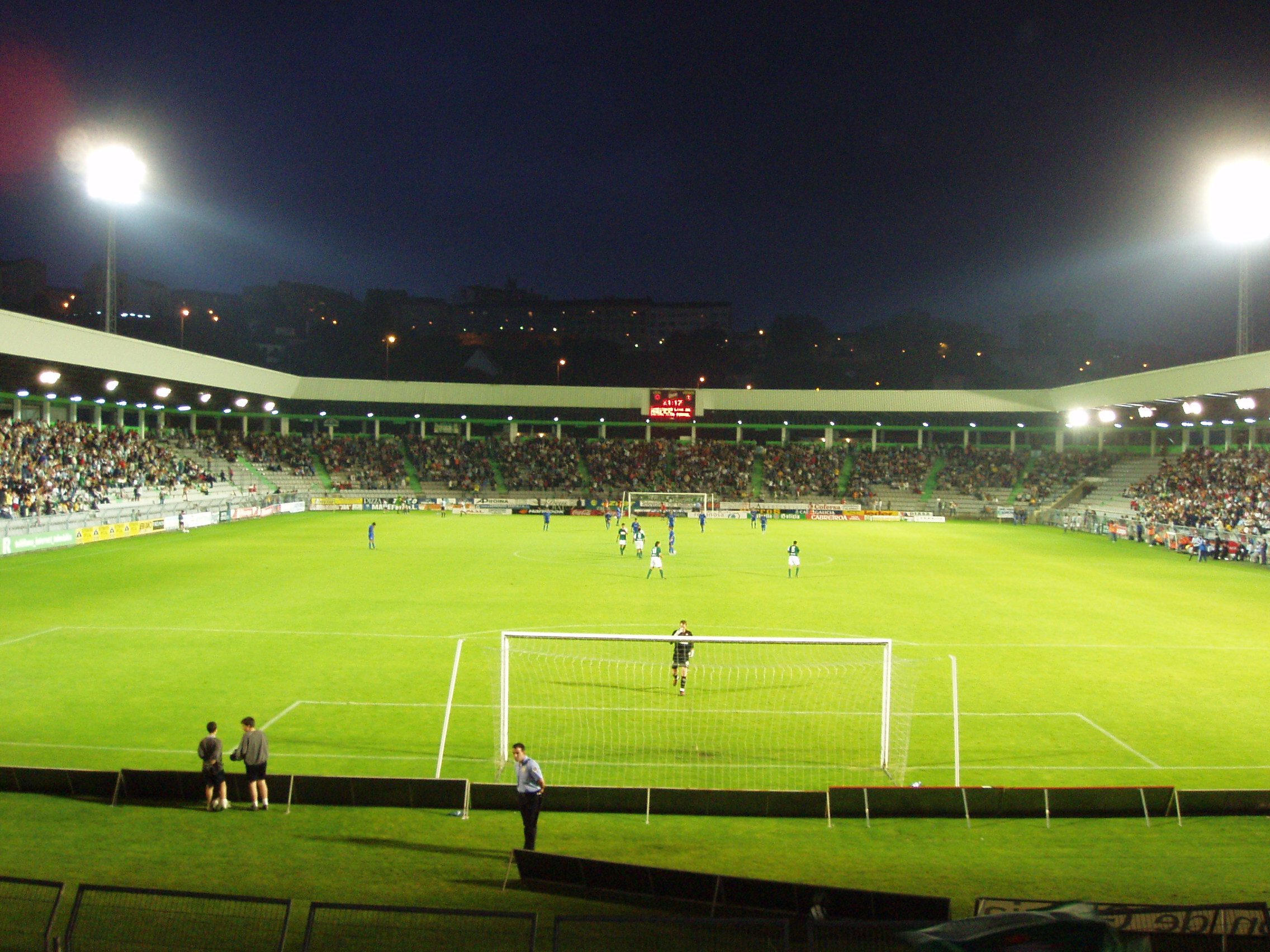

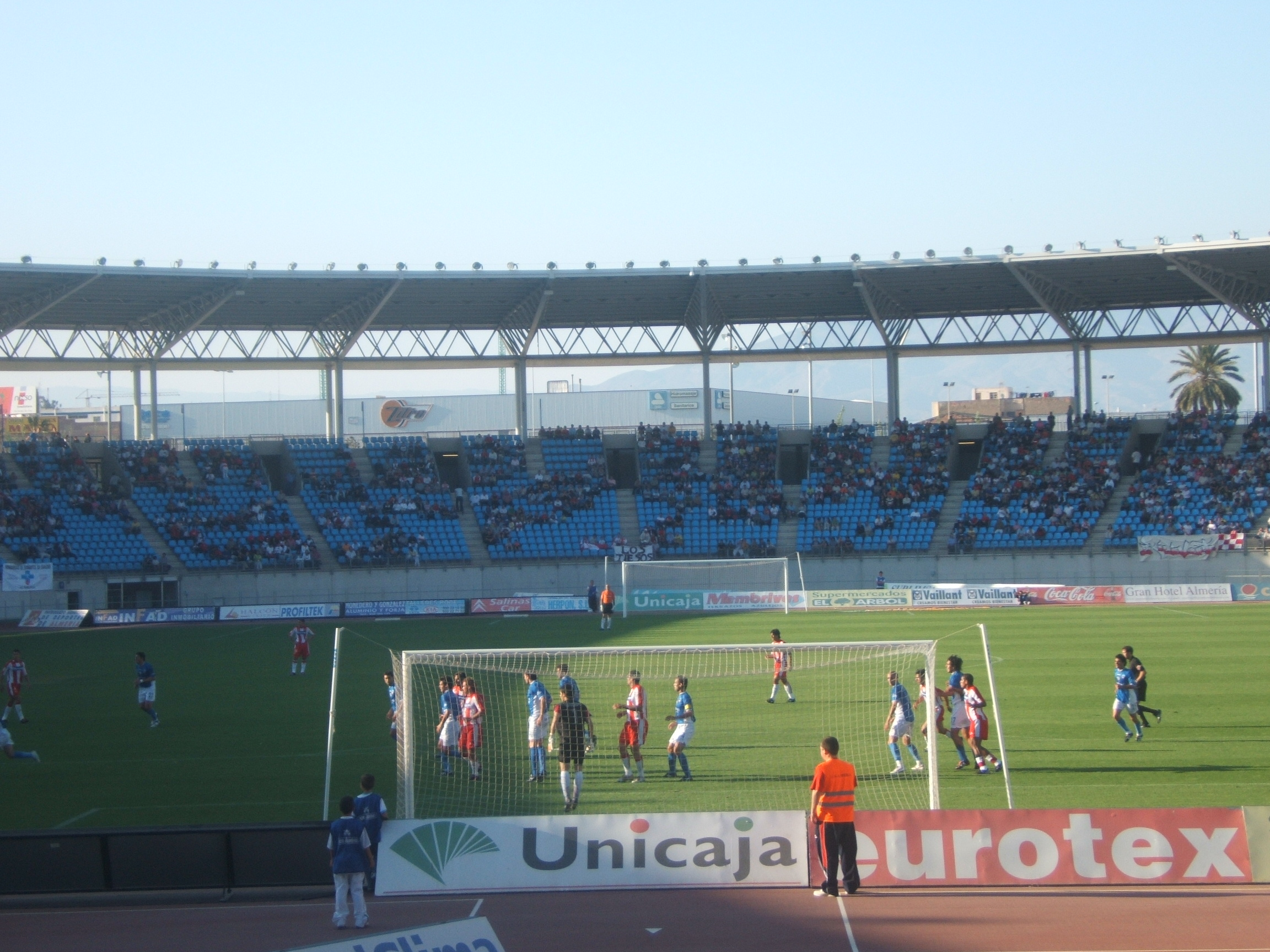
Almería-Lleida 02

The 2005-06 Segunda División season was the 75th since its establishment. The first matches were played on August 27, 2005, and the season ended on June 18, 2006.

== Teams ==
Location of teams in Segunda División 2006–07
Canary Islands

The 2005–06 Segunda División was made up of the following teams:

Team	Home city	Stadium	Capacity
Albacete	Albacete	Carlos Belmonte	17,500
Almería	Almería	Juegos Mediterráneos	15,000
Castellón	Castellón	Nou Estadi Castàlia	14,485
Ciudad de Murcia	Murcia	La Condomina	17,000
Eibar	Eibar	Ipurua	5,000
Elche	Elche	Martínez Valero	36,017
Gimnàstic	Tarragona	Nou Estadi	14,591
Hércules	Alicante	José Rico Pérez	29,500
Levante	Valencia	Ciutat de València	26,354
Lleida	Leida	Camp d'Esports	13,500
Lorca Deportiva	Lorca	Francisco Artés Carrasco	8,120
Málaga B	Málaga	La Rosaleda	28,963
Numancia	Soria	Nuevo Los Pajaritos	9,800
Polideportivo Ejido	El Ejido	Santo Domingo	7,870
Racing Ferrol	Ferrol	A Malata	12,024
Real Madrid Castilla	Madrid	Ciudad Real Madrid	6,000
Real Murcia	Murcia	La Condomina	16,800
Recreativo de Huelva	Huelva	Nuevo Colombino	21,670
Sporting de Gijón	Gijón	El Molinón	25,885
Tenerife	Santa Cruz de Tenerife	Heliodoro Rodríguez López	22,824
Real Valladolid	Valladolid	José Zorrilla	27,846
Xerez	Jerez de la Frontera	Chapín	20,523

== League table ==
Pos	Team	Pld	W	D	L	GF	GA	GD	Pts	Promotion or relegation
1	Recreativo (C, P)	42	22	12	8	67	32	+35	78	Promotion to La Liga
2	Gimnàstic (P)	42	23	7	12	48	38	+10	76	Promotion to La Liga
3	Levante (P)	42	20	14	8	53	39	+14	74	Promotion to La Liga
4	Ciudad de Murcia	42	20	12	10	53	42	+11	72	
5	Lorca Deportiva	42	19	12	11	56	39	+17	69	
6	Almería	42	20	7	15	54	43	+11	67 (Note: ALM 3–0 XER; XER 0–0 ALM)	
7	Xerez	42	18	13	11	60	46	+14	67	
8	Numancia	42	18	9	15	50	55	−5	63	
9	Sporting Gijón	42	13	17	12	41	34	+7	56	
10	Valladolid	42	14	13	15	54	54	0	55 (Note: RMC 2–3 VLD; VLD 1–0 RMC)	
11	Real Madrid Castilla	42	16	7	19	55	50	+5	55	
12	Castellón	42	14	12	16	46	50	−4	54 (Note: CAS 0–0 ALB; ALB 1–1 CAS)	
13	Albacete	42	14	12	16	44	57	−13	54	
14	Elche	42	13	14	15	47	54	−7	53 (Note: ELC 2–0 EJI; EJI 2–1 ELC)	
15	Poli Ejido	42	15	8	19	43	50	−7	53	
16	Murcia	42	13	13	16	41	40	+1	52 (Note: HÉR 1–1 MUR; MUR 3–1 HÉR)	
17	Hércules	42	13	13	16	39	49	−10	52	
18	Tenerife	42	13	12	17	53	60	−7	51	
19	Lleida (R)	42	12	10	20	43	53	−10	46	Relegation to Segunda División B
20	Racing Ferrol (R)	42	7	16	19	44	63	−19	37	Relegation to Segunda División B
21	Málaga B (R)	42	8	12	22	42	68	−26	36	Relegation to Segunda División B
22	Eibar (R)	42	6	17	19	28	45	−17	35	Relegation to Segunda División B

Source: BDFutbol
Rules for classification: 1st points; 2nd head-to-head points; 3rd head-to-head goal difference; 4th head-to-head goals scored; 5th goal difference; 6th number of goals scored; 7th Fair-play points
(C) Champions; (P) Promoted; (R) Relegated

== Results ==
Home \ Away	ALB	ALM	CAS	CIU	EIB	ELC	GIM	HER	LEV	LLE	LOR	MAB	MUR	NUM	POL	RAF	RMC	REC	SPO	TEN	VAD	XER
Albacete	—	3–1	1–1	2–2	2–1	1–2	1–4	2–0	1–1	1–0	1–0	0–1	0–0	0–0	1–0	1–2	1–0	1–0	1–0	3–2	2–3	2–0
Almería	1–2	—	2–1	1–0	1–1	2–0	0–1	1–0	5–1	3–1	1–0	2–1	2–0	1–2	1–2	2–1	3–2	2–1	3–0	2–0	2–1	3–0
Castellón	0–0	2–0	—	1–2	2–0	1–1	0–2	1–2	0–0	0–3	0–0	2–2	2–1	0–1	2–1	1–0	3–1	2–0	1–0	1–0	0–0	3–2
Ciudad de Murcia	0–0	0–0	0–0	—	0–2	4–1	2–0	1–0	2–1	3–1	1–0	5–0	1–0	0–1	0–1	2–1	2–1	3–1	1–0	3–0	0–2	2–6
Eibar	1–1	0–1	2–0	0–0	—	1–2	0–1	0–1	1–1	1–1	0–3	1–1	0–0	1–2	3–1	1–1	1–3	2–1	0–1	0–1	0–1	0–1
Elche	4–3	0–0	1–2	0–0	1–1	—	1–0	1–1	0–1	3–2	1–3	2–0	1–1	4–1	2–0	1–0	2–1	1–1	0–0	2–2	0–2	1–0
Gimnàstic	4–1	1–0	1–1	2–0	1–0	1–0	—	1–1	1–0	0–2	2–0	3–2	3–1	1–0	2–0	1–2	0–1	0–0	0–4	0–0	3–2	0–3
Hércules	2–1	2–2	1–0	2–1	1–1	0–0	0–1	—	3–0	2–1	0–2	1–1	1–1	4–0	1–0	1–1	0–1	0–2	3–2	1–0	2–0	0–3
Levante	1–1	2–4	3–2	6–0	0–0	1–0	1–1	2–0	—	2–0	0–0	2–1	1–0	1–0	2–0	2–1	3–0	1–3	0–0	1–0	2–1	2–3
Lleida	3–0	1–0	1–0	1–2	0–0	0–0	1–2	0–1	0–1	—	2–2	0–0	1–1	5–0	1–0	1–1	2–1	0–4	0–1	2–1	0–4	0–1
Lorca Deportiva	3–0	1–1	3–2	2–2	1–0	2–1	1–0	4–0	1–1	1–2	—	1–0	0–1	1–1	0–0	1–1	2–1	2–1	1–0	1–1	2–0	1–1
Málaga "B"	1–1	3–1	1–2	0–1	1–1	1–3	1–2	1–1	0–0	0–1	2–1	—	2–0	5–4	0–1	0–1	0–1	0–2	1–0	1–4	2–1	0–0
Murcia	2–0	1–0	4–1	0–0	1–0	1–0	0–1	3–1	0–0	2–0	0–1	4–1	—	3–1	0–0	2–1	1–1	0–2	1–0	2–2	2–2	0–1
Numancia	1–0	3–0	2–1	1–1	1–2	3–1	0–1	1–0	0–1	1–0	1–0	2–1	0–0	—	1–2	1–1	3–2	0–3	1–0	2–0	3–2	1–1
Poli Ejido	2–0	0–1	0–2	2–3	0–1	2–1	2–0	3–1	0–0	2–1	2–3	1–2	0–3	0–1	—	4–2	0–3	0–0	1–0	2–0	1–1	4–1
Racing Ferrol	2–3	1–1	1–1	1–1	4–0	2–1	1–1	1–1	1–2	0–0	0–3	2–1	2–2	1–3	0–1	—	0–0	0–3	0–0	2–3	0–1	1–1
RM Castilla	3–0	0–1	1–2	0–1	1–0	4–0	1–0	3–0	0–0	0–0	1–2	4–1	1–0	1–1	2–0	1–0	—	1–2	1–1	1–2	2–3	4–3
Recreativo	1–1	2–0	2–2	1–0	0–0	2–0	3–0	1–0	4–1	3–2	2–1	0–0	1–0	1–1	2–2	3–0	4–1	—	0–0	3–1	2–0	1–2
Sporting	2–0	1–0	2–0	2–2	1–1	2–2	0–1	1–1	0–2	2–0	1–0	0–0	1–0	1–0	1–1	3–1	1–1	1–1	—	2–2	1–1	1–1
Tenerife	1–1	2–1	1–1	0–1	1–1	0–0	3–1	0–0	0–1	2–2	2–3	3–2	3–1	2–1	2–1	1–2	0–1	1–0	1–3	—	2–1	3–1
Valladolid	0–1	1–0	1–0	0–2	0–0	2–2	0–2	1–1	3–3	3–2	1–1	1–1	1–0	3–1	0–1	3–3	1–0	0–1	1–3	1–1	—	3–1
Xerez	3–1	0–0	2–1	0–0	2–1	1–2	0–0	1–0	0–1	0–1	3–0	4–2	2–0	1–1	1–1	2–0	2–1	1–1	0–0	3–1	0–0	—

Source: BDFutbol
Legend: Blue = home team win; Yellow = draw; Red = away team win.

== Final conclusions ==
=== Promoted to La Liga ===
- Recreativo de Huelva
- Gimnàstic de Tarragona
- Levante UD

=== Relegated to Segunda División B ===
- UE Lleida—Relegated to Segunda División B - Group 3
- Ferrol—Relegated to Segunda División B - Group 1
- Eibar—Relegated to Segunda División B - Group 4
- Málaga B—Relegated to Segunda División B - Group 2

=== Relegated from La Liga ===
- Deportivo Alavés
- Cádiz CF
- Málaga CF

== Top scorers ==
- Ikechukwu Uche (Recreativo) - 20 goals
- José Juan Luque (Ciudad Murcia) - 20 goals
- Roberto Soldado (Real Madrid Castilla) - 19 goals
- Mate Bilić (Lleida) - 18 goals
- Gastón Casas (Recreativo) - 14 goals

== Top goalkeepers ==
- Roberto (Sporting Gijón) - 31 goals in 38 matches
- Pablo Cavallero (Levante) - 32 goals in 37 matches
- David Cobeño (Real Madrid Castilla) - 26 goals in 30 matches
- Juanmi (Real Murcia) - 38 goals in 41 matches
- Joaquín Valerio (Almería) - 38 goals in 39 matches

== Teams by Autonomous Community ==
	Autonomous community	Number of teams	Teams
1	Andalusia	5	Almería, Málaga B, Poli Ejido, Recreativo, Xerez
2	Valencian Community	4	Castellón, Elche, Hércules, Levante
3	Region of Murcia	3	Ciudad de Murcia, Lorca, Murcia
4	Castile and León	2	Numancia, Valladolid
4	Catalonia	2	Gimnàstic, Lleida
6	Asturias	1	Sporting de Gijón
6	Basque Country	1	Eibar
6	Canary Islands	1	Tenerife
6	Castile-La Mancha	1	Albacete
6	Galicia	1	Racing de Ferrol
6	Madrid	1	Real Madrid Castilla

== See also ==
- List of transfers of Segunda División – 2005–06 season
