= Carlos Wilson (footballer, born 1912) =

Argentine footballer

Carlos Armando Wilson
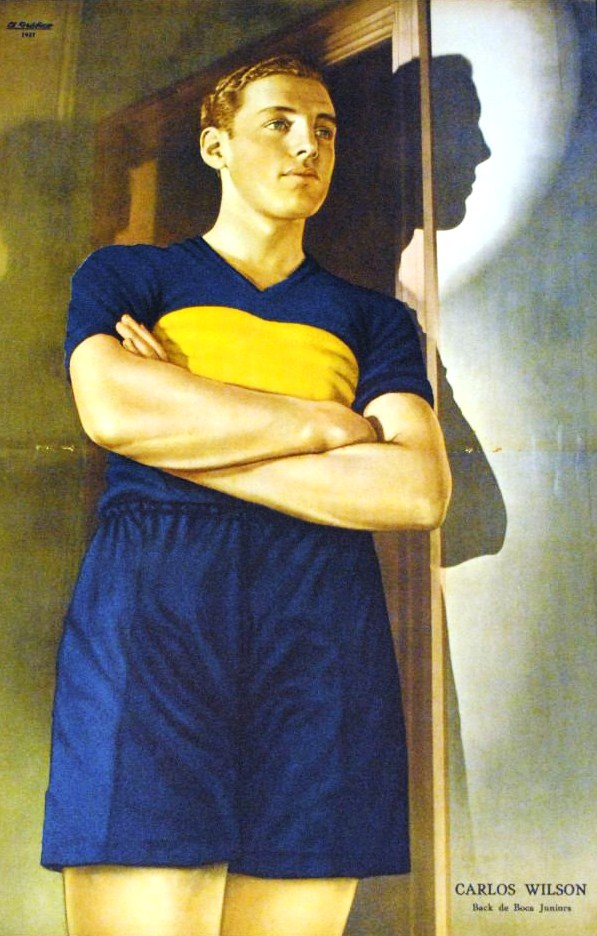
- Carlos Wilson in Boca Juniors, cover of El Gráfico

Personal information
- Full name: Carlos Armando Wilson
- Date of birth: 14 August 1912
- Place of birth: Buenos Aires Province; Argentina
- Date of death: 26 February 1996 (aged 83)
- Position: Defender

Senior career*
Years	Team	Apps	(Gls)
1930–1935	Talleres (BA)		
1936–1937	Boca Juniors		
1938–1939	Lanús		
1940–1941	Talleres (BA)		

International career
1935	Argentina		
- * Club domestic league appearances and goals

Carlos Wilson (14 August 1912 – 26 February 1996) was an Argentine footballer, who played in Talleres de Remedios de Escalada and Boca Juniors.

== Career ==
Wilson was born in Remedios de Escalada, (province of Buenos Aires) he started in the lower divisions of Talleres. Wilson debuted at 17 years playing in the first division club Talleres de Remedios de Escalada. His excellent performances earned him a place in the National team, that competed in the Sudamericano de Lima 1935. He played as a starter 3 matches this tournament.

In 1936 and 1937 Wilson played for Boca Juniors, who were chasing the Campeonato de Primera División 1936. He then played for Club Atlético Lanús, and in 1940 returned to Talleres where he ended his career.

He was also Grand Master of the Grand Lodge of Argentina of Free and Accepted Masons for three periods and made honorary member of Excelsior Lodge number 617 under the United Grand Lodge of England.

He died in Buenos Aires on February 26, 1996, and his remains were buried at the Santa Catalina British Cemetery in Llavallol.
