= Club Atlético San Miguel =

Argentine sports club

San Miguel
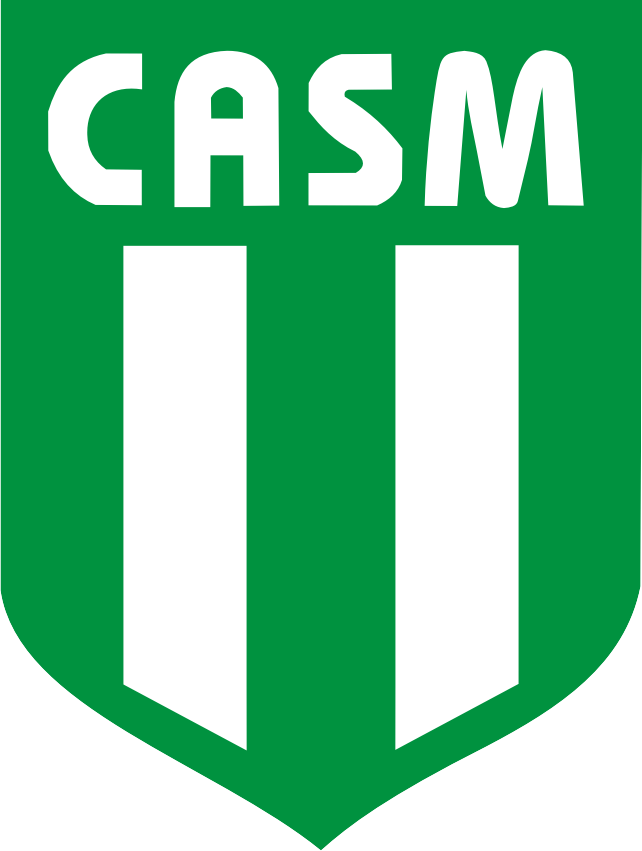
- Full name: Club Atlético San Miguel
- Nickname: Trueno Verde (Green Thunder)
- Founded: 7 August 1922; 104 years ago
- Ground: Los Polvorines, Argentina
- Capacity: 7,096
- Manager: Sebastián Battaglia
- League: Primera Nacional
- 2025: 5th of Zona A
- Website: clubatleticosanmiguel.com
Home colours

Club Atlético San Miguel is an Argentine sports club from San Miguel, Buenos Aires. The club's headquarters are located in San Miguel while its football stadium is erected in Los Polvorines district of Malvinas Argentinas Partido. Although many sports are practised at the club, San Miguel is mostly known for its football team, which currently plays in Primera B, the third division of the Argentine football league system.

Apart from football, the club has also a basketball section.

== History ==
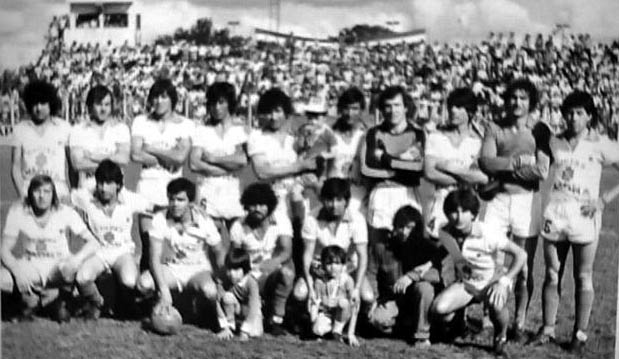
San Miguel in 1984, Primera C champions

The institution was established on 7 August 1922 as "Club Independiente San Miguel", while it was decided that the colors of the jersey would be green and white.

In 1930 the club merged to Club Germinal of Villa Lynch, but the fusion was dissolved a year later and the club changed its name to current "Club Atlético San Miguel". Five years later the club acquired the land where headquarters are currently located.

In 1977 San Miguel acquired a land in Los Polvorines district of Greater Buenos Aires, where the club built a multi-sports field (which would be inaugurated on 3 September 1978 with a friendly match against Sportivo Italiano). That same year San Miguel affiliated to Argentine Football Association, debuting in the Primera D tournament.

The club won its first title in 1979, promoting to Primera C, then the third division of Argentine league system. After spending some seasons in Primera C, San Miguel won another title in 1984 promoting to Primera B. Journalists Juan Carlutti and Gastón Asiari nicknamed the team "El Trueno Verde" (The Green Thunder) during its first year in the second division due to the great campaign made by the squad. The coach was Rubén Glaria.

== Players ==
=== Current squad ===
As of 9 March 2026 Note: Flags indicate national team as defined under FIFA eligibility rules; some limited exceptions apply. Players may hold more than one non-FIFA nationality.

No.	Pos.	Nation	Player
—	GK	ARG	Juan Manuel Lungarzo
—	GK	ARG	Mateo Reynoso
—	GK	COL	Matías Escobar
—	GK	ARG	Andrés Sosa (on loan from Platense)
—	DF	ARG	Franco Aguirre
—	DF	ARG	Felipe Coronel
—	DF	ARG	Facundo Cardozo
—	DF	ARG	Kevin Ceceri
—	DF	COL	Dixon Rentería
—	DF	ARG	Alexis Cruz
—	DF	ARG	Damián Adín
—	DF	ARG	Lucio Pérez
—	MF	ARG	Fabrizio Almeida
—	MF	ARG	Leandro Desábato

No.	Pos.	Nation	Player
—	MF	ARG	Thomas Carosio
—	MF	ARG	Elian De La Cruz
—	MF	ARG	Iván Ramírez
—	MF	ARG	David Müller
—	MF	ARG	Matías Benítez
—	MF	ARG	Mateo Serra (on loan from Rosario Central)
—	MF	ARG	Jorge Ferrero
—	FW	ARG	Tomás Díaz
—	FW	ARG	Lucas Brochero (on loan from Boca Juniors)
—	FW	ARG	Daniel Juárez (on loan from Unión de Santa Fe)
—	FW	ARG	Máximo Osés (on loan from Belgrano)
—	FW	ARG	Bruno Nasta (captain)
—	FW	ARG	Tomás Jérez
—	FW	ARG	Lucas Delgado

=== Reserve squad ===
Note: Flags indicate national team as defined under FIFA eligibility rules; some limited exceptions apply. Players may hold more than one non-FIFA nationality.

No.	Pos.	Nation	Player
—	DF	ARG	Leandro Ortíz
—	DF	ARG	Agustín Desimone
—	MF	ARG	Tiago Gordillo

== Titles ==
- Primera B Metropolitana (1): 1996–97
- Primera C Metropolitana (2): 1984, 2016–17
- Primera D Metropolitana (1): 1979
