= Adrián Taffarel =

Argentine footballer and manager

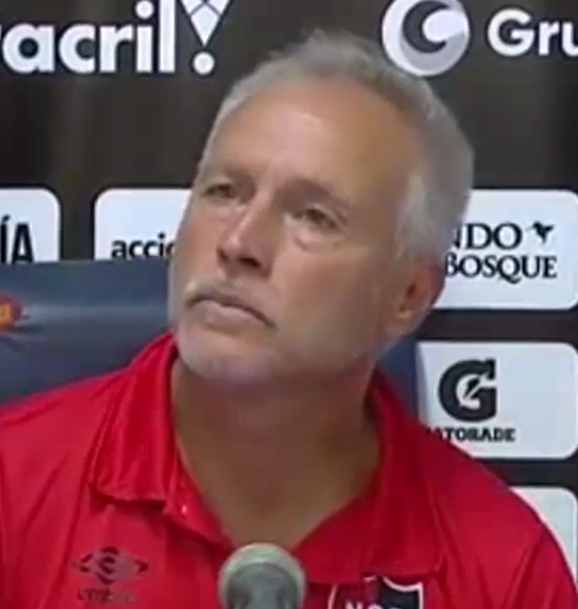
- Taffarel in 2021

Personal information
- Full name: Adrián Blas Taffarel
- Date of birth: 10 January 1966 (age 60)
- Place of birth: Rosario, Argentina
- Height: 1.70 m (5 ft 7 in)
- Position: Forward

Team information
- Current team: Cantolao (manager)

Youth career
- Newell's Old Boys

Senior career*
| Years | Team | Apps | (Gls) |
| 1988–1991 | Newell's Old Boys | 47 | (8) |
| 1991 | Chaco For Ever | 18 | (4) |
| 1991–1993 | Ferro Carril Oeste | 31 | (7) |
| 1993 | Banfield | 7 | (1) |
| 1994 | Gimnasia y Tiro | | |
| 1995 | Irapuato | | |
| 1997 | O'Higgins | | |
| 1997–1998 | Argentino de Rosario | 11 | (1) |

Managerial career
- 1998–1999: San Martín de Chovet
- 1999–2001: Newell's Old Boys (youth)
- 2001–2004: Unión y Cultura
- 2002: Argentino de Rosario
- 2005–2012: Newell's Old Boys (youth)
- 2013: Jorge Newbery
- 2015: San Martín de Chovet
- 2016: Newell's Old Boys (youth)
- 2016: Unión y Cultura
- 2018: Sportivo María Teresa
- 2019–2022: Newell's Old Boys (youth)
- 2021: Newell's Old Boys (interim)
- 2023: Unión Huaral
- 2023: Cantolao
- 2025: Sport Club Cañadense
- * Club domestic league appearances and goals

Adrián Blas Taffarel (born 10 January 1966) is an Argentine football manager and former player who played as a forward. He is the current manager of the Argentinian Regional League Club Sport Club Cañadense.

== Playing career ==
A Newell's Old Boys youth graduate, Taffarel made his first team debut in September 1988, and was a part of the squad which won the 1990–91 Argentine Primera División, even though he ended the campaign at Chaco For Ever. In 1991, he joined Ferro Carril Oeste also in the top tier, and played for a brief period for Banfield in 1993.

In 1995, after a year with Gimnasia y Tiro, Taffarel moved abroad and joined Mexican side Irapuato. In 1997, he played in the Primera B de Chile for O'Higgins before returning to his home country with Argentino de Rosario. He retired in 1998, aged 32.

== Managerial career ==
Immediately after retiring Taffarel took up coaching, being manager of CA San Martín de Chovet before returning to Newell's in 1999, as a youth coach. He was also a manager of former side Argentino de Rosario in 2002, and was in charge of CR Unión y Cultura de Murphy in 2001 to 2004 and in 2016, Jorge Newbery de Comodoro Rivadavia in 2013, back at San Martín in 2015 and Club Sportivo María Teresa in 2018.

Taffarel returned to Newell's and their youth categories in 2019. On 18 October 2021, after Fernando Gamboa was sacked, he was named interim manager until the end of the tournament. He returned to the youth sides shortly after, before leaving the club in 2022.

On 7 February 2023, Taffarel moved abroad and was named manager of Peruvian Segunda División side Unión Huaral. On 15 June, he took over Cantolao in the country's Primera División.

On 19 december 2024, Taffarel was presented as Sport Club Cañadense manager, team that plays in Liga Cañadense de Futbol (Argentinian 5th tier)
