= Hugo Donato =

Argentine footballer and manager

Personal information
- Full name: Hugo Daniel Donato
- Date of birth: 25 October 1974 (age 52)
- Place of birth: Remedios de Escalada, Argentina
- Height: 1.80 m (5 ft 11 in)
- Position: Midfielder

Team information
- Current team: Banfield (youth manager)

Youth career
- Talleres (RE)

Senior career*
Years	Team	Apps	(Gls)
1991–1993	Talleres (RE)	48	(1)
1993–1994	Banfield	4	(0)
1994–1995	Ferro Carril Oeste	8	(0)
1995–1996	Almirante Brown	17	(0)
1996–1998	Pro Sesto		
1998–1999	Huracán Corrientes	19	(0)
1999–2000	Estudiantes BA	34	(0)
2000–2001	Talleres (RE)		
2006–2008	Talleres (RE)		
2008	Berazategui	12	(0)
2009	Cañuelas	5	(0)
2009	Central Ballester	1	(0)

Managerial career
- 2013–: Banfield (youth)
- 2021: Banfield (interim)
- * Club domestic league appearances and goals

Hugo Daniel Donato (born 25 October 1974) is an Argentine football manager and former player who played as a midfielder. He is the current manager of Banfield's youth categories.
