= Hugo Magallanes =

Uruguayan footballer (born 1997)

Personal information
- Full name: Hugo Alejandro Magallanes Silveira
- Date of birth: 26 August 1997 (age 29)
- Place of birth: Melo, Uruguay
- Height: 1.89 m (6 ft 2 in)
- Position: Centre-back

Team information
- Current team: Everton
- Number: 4

Youth career
- Cerro Largo

Senior career*
Years	Team	Apps	(Gls)
2015–2019	Cerro Largo	42	(0)
2016–2017	→ Ceará (loan)	0	(0)
2019–2021	Nacional	1	(0)
2020	→ Cerro Largo (loan)	12	(0)
2021	→ Querétaro (loan)	9	(0)
2021–2023	Querétaro	0	(0)
2021	→ Patronato (loan)	3	(0)
2022	→ Ayacucho (loan)	25	(0)
2023	→ Cerro (loan)	21	(1)
2023–2025	Racing Montevideo	46	(0)
2025	→ Everton (loan)	21	(0)
2026–	Everton	0	(0)

International career^{‡}
2015	Uruguay U18		
2024–	Uruguay A'	1	(0)
- * Club domestic league appearances and goals as of 13 January 2026 ‡ National team caps and goals as of 19 January 2025

Hugo Alejandro Magallanes Silveira (born 26 August 1997) is a Uruguayan professional footballer who plays as a centre-back for Chilean club Everton.

== Club career ==
Born in Melo, Uruguay, Magallanes made his senior debut with Cerro Largo in 2015. At the beginning of 2016, he had a trial with Brazilian club Internacional before joining Ceará.

In 2019, Magallanes signed with Nacional. After having little chance to play, he was loaned out to Cerro Largo and Mexican club Querétaro in 2020 and 2021, respectively.

As a player of Querétaro, Magallanes had stints on loan with Patronato in Argentina (2021), Ayacucho in Peru (2022) and Cerro in his homeland (2023).

In August 2023, Magallanes signed with Racing Club de Montevideo. In January 2025, he moved on loan to Chilean club Everton de Viña del Mar on a one-year deal.

On 12 January 2026, Magallanes renewed with Everton on a deal until the 2028 season.

== International career ==
In 2015, Magallanes was called up to the Uruguay under-18 team under Fabián Coito.

On 1 September 2024, Magallanes made his debut for the Uruguay A' team in a friendly match against Guatemala.
