= José Di Leo =

Argentine footballer and manager

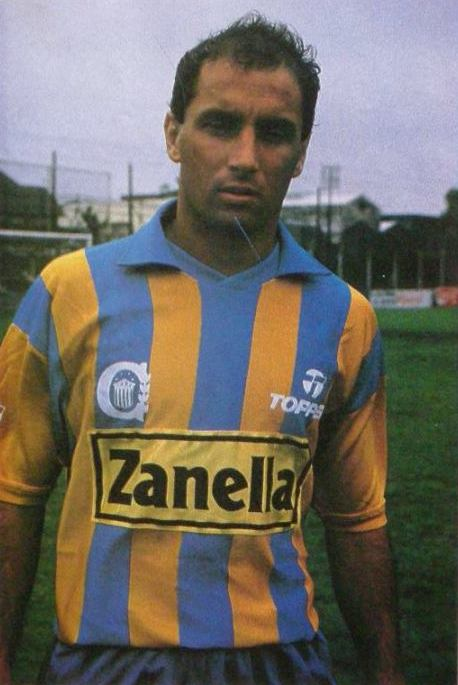

Personal information
- Full name: José Daniel Di Leo
- Date of birth: 2 January 1961 (age 65)
- Place of birth: Rosario, Argentina
- Position: Defender

Team information
- Current team: San Lorenzo (assistant)

Youth career
- Rosario Central

Senior career*
Years	Team	Apps	(Gls)
1982–1990	Rosario Central	124	(2)
1984–1985	→ Talleres (loan)	22	(0)
1986	→ Colón (loan)		

Managerial career
- 1999–2001: Rosario Central (assistant)
- 2001–2002: Vélez Sarsfield (assistant)
- 2002–2003: Colón (assistant)
- 2004–2005: Sporting Cristal (assistant)
- 2005–2006: Colón (assistant)
- 2006–2008: LDU Quito (assistant)
- 2009: Al-Nassr (assistant)
- 2010–2013: LDU Quito (assistant)
- 2014–2015: San Lorenzo (assistant)
- 2016: São Paulo (assistant)
- 2016–2017: Argentina (assistant)
- 2017: United Arab Emirates (assistant)
- 2017: Saudi Arabia (assistant)
- 2018–2019: Rosario Central (assistant)
- 2021–: San Lorenzo (assistant)
- 2021: San Lorenzo (interim)
- * Club domestic league appearances and goals

José Daniel Di Leo (born 2 January 1961) is an Argentine football manager and former player who played as a defender. He is the current assistant manager of San Lorenzo.
