= Gastón Casas =

Argentine footballer

Personal information
- Full name: Ángel Gastón Casas Jorge
- Date of birth: 10 January 1978 (age 48)
- Place of birth: Buenos Aires, Argentina
- Height: 1.82 m (6 ft 0 in)
- Position: Striker

Team information
- Current team: Huracán (youth)

Youth career
- Huracán

Senior career*
Years	Team	Apps	(Gls)
1994–2000	Huracán	108	(37)
2001–2004	Betis	55	(16)
2003–2004	→ Racing Club (loan)	13	(2)
2004	Argentinos Juniors	6	(0)
2005–2006	Recreativo	44	(18)
2006–2007	Elche	28	(12)
2007–2008	Cádiz	30	(5)
2008–2009	Córdoba	13	(2)
2009	Ionikos	10	(6)
2009–2011	AEL	13	(2)
2010–2011	→ Gimnasia LP (loan)	10	(2)
2011	Defensores Belgrano	8	(3)
2012	Talleres Escalada	2	(0)
2013	Argentinos Quilmes	5	(0)
Total		345	(105)

Managerial career
- 2013–2016: Huracán (youth)
- 2016–2018: Racing Club (youth)
- 2018–: Huracán (youth)
- 2021: Huracán (interim)
- * Club domestic league appearances and goals

Ángel Gastón Casas Jorge (born 10 January 1978) is an Argentine football manager and former player who played as a striker. He is the current manager of Huracán's youth setup.

== Club career ==
Born in Buenos Aires, Casas started playing professionally with Club Atlético Huracán, moving in 2000 to Spain with Real Betis and helping the Andalusian team achieve promotion to La Liga in his first season. Due to the years spent in the latter country, he eventually gained dual nationality.

Casas returned to Argentina in 2003, representing Racing Club de Avellaneda and Argentinos Juniors, but made the switch back to Spain two years later, consecutively playing in the country's second division with Recreativo de Huelva, Elche CF, Cádiz CF and Córdoba CF. In the 2005–06 campaign, he finished fifth in the topscorer's chart at 14 as the first club returned to La Liga after a three-year absence.

In February 2009, after his release from Córdoba, Casas moved to Ionikos F.C. in the Greek second division. He scored on his debut, a 4–4 home draw against Olympiacos Volos.

On 29 August 2009, Casas moved teams again but stayed in the country, joining Athlitiki Enosi Larissa F.C. on a one-year contract. However, in January 2010, he returned to Argentina, signing with Club de Gimnasia y Esgrima La Plata on loan.
