= List of foreign Ligue 1 players: A =

This is a list of foreign players in the French Ligue 1, which commenced play in 1932. The following players must meet both of the following two criteria:

1. Have played at least one Ligue 1 game. Players who were signed by Ligue 1 clubs, but only played in lower league, cup and/or European games, or did not play in any competitive games at all, are not included.
2. Are considered foreign, i.e., outside France and its dependencies (Guadeloupe, Martinique, Reunion Island or French Polynesia), determined by the following:

A player is considered foreign if he is not eligible to play for the national teams of France.

More specifically,

- If a player has been capped on international level, the national team is used; if he has been capped by more than one country, the highest level (or the most recent) team is used. These include French players with dual citizenship. Players who played for France but came as foreign players (such as Miguel Ángel Lauri) are also listed.
- If a player has not been capped on international level, his country of birth is used, except those who were born abroad from French parents or moved to France at a young age, and those who clearly indicated to have switched his nationality to another nation.

Clubs listed are those that the player has played at least one Ligue 1 game for.

Seasons listed are those that the player has played at least one Ligue 1 game in. Note that seasons, not calendar years, are used. For example, "1992–95" indicates that the player has played in every season from 1992–93 to 1994–95, but not necessarily every calendar year from 1992 to 1995.

In bold: players still active in Ligue 1 and their respective teams in current season.

== Albania ==
- Iván Balliu – Metz – 2016–18
- Lorik Cana – Paris SG, Marseille, Nantes – 2002–07, 2015–16
- Qazim Laçi – Ajaccio – 2022–23
- Ermir Lenjani – Rennes, Nantes – 2014–17
- Riza Lushta – Cannes – 1948–49
- Edvin Murati – Paris SG, Lille – 1997–98, 1999–2002

== Algeria ==
=== A ===
- Radouane Abbes – Montpellier – 1987–88, 1989–90
- **Himad Abdelli** – Angers, **Marseille** – 2022–23, 2024–
- Boumedienne Abderrahmane – Sète, Marseille – 1945–52, 1953–54
- Djamel Abdoun – Ajaccio, Nantes – 2003–06, 2008–09
- Mehdi Abeid – Dijon, Nantes – 2016–21
- Madjid Adjaoud – Sedan – 1999–2003
- Laurent Agouazi – Metz, Boulogne – 2005–06, 2007–08, 2009–10
- Rayan Aït-Nouri – Angers – 2018–21
- Nassim Akrour – Troyes, Grenoble – 2002–03, 2008–10
- Mohamed Ali Messaoud – Paris SG – 1976–77
- Hassan Akesbi – Nîmes, Reims, Monaco 1955–65
- Saïd Amara – Strasbourg, Béziers, Bordeaux - 1956–58, 1962–64
- **Mohamed Amoura** – **Nice** – 2026–
- Houssem Aouar – Lyon – 2016–23
- Adil Aouchiche – Paris SG, Saint-Étienne, Lorient – 2019–23
- Karim Aribi – Nîmes – 2020–21
- Salim Arrache – Strasbourg, Marseille, Toulouse – 2003–08
- Mokhtar Arribi – Sète, Lens – 1946–51, 1952–55
- Salah Assad – Mulhouse, Paris SG – 1982–83, 1984–85
- Youcef Atal – Nice – 2018–24

=== B ===
- Louardi Badjika – SC Bastia – 1981–82
- Salah Bakour – Caen – 2004–05
- Nadjib Baouia – Evian TG – 2012–14
- Kaddour Bekhloufi – AS Monaco – 1957–58
- Hamid Belabbes – Stade Français – 1966–67
- Jacky Belabde – Chamois Niortais – 1987–88
- Rachid Belaid – Toulouse FC (1937), FC Nancy, Nice – 1950–51, 1952–54
- Youcef Belaïli – Brest, Ajaccio – 2021–23
- Omar Belbey – Montpellier – 2001–02
- Ishak Belfodil – Lyon – 2011–18, 2019–21
- Nadir Belhadj – Sedan, Lyon, Lens – 2009–10, 2011–12
- Tahar Belhadj – Le Havre – 1946–47
- **Haris Belkebla** – Brest, **Angers** – 2019–23, 2024–
- Youssef Belkebla – Saint-Étienne – 1986–88
- Habib Bellaïd – Strasbourg, Boulogne – 2005–06, 2007–08, 2009–10
- Djamel Belmadi – Paris SG, Marseille, Valenciennes – 1995–96, 1999–02, 2007–09
- Nordine Ben Ali – Colmar – 1948–49
- Said Ben Arab – Bordeaux – 1950–51
- Ali Ben Fadah – Alès, Angers – 1957–60
- Madjid Ben Haddou – Nice – 2002–04
- Halim Ben Mabrouk – RC Paris, Bordeaux, Lyon – 1984–85, 1986–92
- Houcine Ben Said – Mulhouse – 1982–83
- Madani Ben Tahar – Lens – 1964–68
- Abdelaziz Ben Tifour – Nice, Troyes, AS Monaco – 1948–53, 1954–58
- Ali Benarbia – Martigues, AS Monaco, Bordeaux, Paris SG – 1993–2001
- Djamel Benlamri – Lyon – 2020–21
- Ismaël Bennacer – Marseille – 2024–25
- Saïd Benrahma – Nice, Angers, Lyon – 2013–16, 2023–25
- Tedj Bensaoula – Le Havre – 1985–86
- Ramy Bensebaini – Montpellier, Rennes – 2015–19
- **Nabil Bentaleb** – Angers, **Lille** – 2021–
- Yassine Benzia – Lyon, Lille, Dijon – 2011–18, 2019–21
- Mohamed Bernou – Montpellier – 1948–50
- Bensaad Bettahar – AS Monaco – 1994–95
- **Kelyann Bezahaf** – **Marseille** – 2026–
- Yacine Bezzaz – Ajaccio, Valenciennes – 2002–05, 2006–09
- Ali Bouafia – Marseille, Lyon, Strasbourg, Lorient – 1987–88, 1989–95, 1998–99
- Badredine Bouanani – Nice, Lorient – 2022–26
- Hameur Bouazza – Arles-Avignon – 2010–11
- Abderrahmane Boubekeur – AS Monaco – 1954–58
- Hocine Bouchache – Le Havre – 1958–61
- Abdelhamid Bouchouk – Sète, Marseille, Toulouse FC (1937) – 1948–51, 1953–58
- **Kaïl Boudache** – Nice, **Lyon** – 2025–
- **Hicham Boudaoui** – **Nice** – 2019–
- Ryad Boudebouz – Sochaux, Bastia, Montpellier, Saint-Étienne – 2008–17, 2019–22
- Fouad Bouguerra – Nantes – 2004–05
- Sadek Boukhalfa – Nantes, Metz – 1963–65, 1967–69
- Farid Boulaya – Bastia, Metz – 2016–18, 2019–22
- Virgile Boumelaha – Sochaux – 2002–03
- **Adil Bourabaa** – **Le Mans** – 2026–
- Abdelmajid Bourebbou – Rouen, Laval – 1977–83
- Mohamed Bouricha – Nîmes Olympique – 1959–60
- Brahim Bourras – Rennes – 1961–63
- Boudjemaa Bourtal – Alès – 1958–59
- Mansour Boutabout – Sedan – 2006–07
- Mohamed Bradja – Troyes – 1999–2003
- Fadel Brahami – Le Havre – 1999–2000, 2002–03
- **Billal Brahimi** – Angers, Nice, Brest, **Le Mans** – 2021–
- Said Brahimi – Toulouse FC (1937) – 1955–58
- Yacine Brahimi – Rennes – 2010–12

=== C ===
- Hacène Chabri – AS Monaco – 1956–57
- Farès Chaïbi – Toulouse – 2022–24
- Fathi Chebal – AS Nancy, Metz, RC Paris – 1975–80, 1984–86
- Ivane Chegra – Ajaccio – 2022–23
- Embarek Chenen – Rouen – 1960–62
- **Samir Chergui** – **Paris FC** – 2025–
- Abdelmalek Cherrad – Nice, Bastia – 2002–05
- Ilyes Chetti – Angers – 2022–23

=== D ===
- Mustapha Dahleb – Sedan, Paris SG – 1969–71, 1973–84
- Kouider Daho – Sète – 1947–48
- Dahmane Defnoun – Alès, Angers – 1957–60, 1962–64
- Andy Delort – Ajaccio, Caen, Toulouse, Montpellier, Nice, Nantes – 2011–13, 2015–23, 2024–25
- Abdel Djaadaoui – Sochaux – 1972–82
- Salah Djebaili – Nîmes Olympique – 1957–66
- Billel Dziri – Sedan – 1999–2000

=== E ===
- Farid El Melali – Angers – 2018–23, 2024–25

=== F ===
- Assassi Fellahi – Saint-Étienne – 1953–56
- Karim Fellahi – Saint-Étienne – 2000–01
- Mehdi Fennouche – Toulouse FC – 2013–14
- Kader Ferhaoui – Montpellier, Cannes, Saint-Étienne – 1987–98, 1999–2000
- Zinedine Ferhat – Nîmes, Angers – 2019–21, 2024–25
- Said Ferrad – Troyes – 1954–56
- Brahim Ferradj – Brest – 2010–13
- Ahmed Firoud – Rennes, Nice – 1945–46, 1948–53
- Kader Firoud – Saint-Étienne, Nîmes Olympique – 1945–48, 1950–54
- Aissa Fouka – Toulouse FC – 1987–90, 1991–94

=== G ===
- Rabah Gamouh – Nîmes Olympique – 1977–81
- Farid Ghazi – Troyes – 1999–2003
- Rachid Ghezzal – Lyon, Monaco – 2012–13, 2014–18, 2025–26
- Kamel Ghilas – Arles-Avignon, Reims – 2010–11, 2012–14
- Faouzi Ghoulam – Saint-Étienne, Angers – 2010–14, 2022–23
- **Amine Gouiri** – Lyon, Nice, Rennes, **Marseille** – 2017–18, 2019–
- Yanis Guermouche – Montpellier – 2021–22
- Rafik Guitane – Rennes, Reims – 2019–20, 2022–23

=== H ===
- Said Hadad – Sète, Marseille, Toulouse FC (1937) – 1946–51, 1953–56
- Fodil Hadjadj – Nantes – 2003–05
- Jaouen Hadjam – Nantes – 2022–24
- Said Hamimi – Brest – 1981–82
- Riad Hammadou – Lille OSC – 2001–02
- Ziri Hammar – AS Nancy – 2010–13
- **Hilan Hamzaoui** – **Marseille** – 2025–
- Salem Harchèche – Saint-Étienne – 1991–96
- Féthi Harek – Bastia – 2012–14
- Ilias Hassani – Toulouse, Bordeaux – 2013–14, 2015–16
- Brahim Hemdani – Cannes, Strasbourg, Marseille – 1997–2005

=== I ===
- Abderrahman Ibrir – Bordeaux, Toulouse FC (1937), Marseille – 1946–53

=== K ===
- Kamel Kaci-Saïd – Cannes – 1997–98
- Foued Kadir – Valenciennes, Marseille, Rennes – 2009–14
- Ahmed Kashi – Metz – 2014–15
- **Ilan Kebbal** – Reims, **Paris FC** – 2021–22, 2025–
- Karim Kerkar – Le Havre – 1998–2000
- Abdelhamid Kermali – Lyon – 1955–58
- Abdelkrim Kerroum – Troyes – 1960–61
- Mahi Khennane – Rennes, Toulouse FC (1937), Nîmes Olympique – 1956–57, 1958–66
- Amar Kodja – Nantes – 1955–56
- Nourredine Kourichi – Valenciennes, Bordeaux, Lille OSC – 1976–86
- Nasreddine Kraouche – Metz – 1998–99

=== L ===
- Lamri Laachi – Paris FC, RC Paris – 1973–74, 1978–79, 1984–85
- Kamel Larbi – Nice – 2003–07
- **Yasser Larouci** – Troyes, **Le Mans** – 2021–23, 2026–
- Mohamed Lekkak – Toulouse FC (1937), Rouen, Lyon, Angoulême – 1958–59, 1962–63, 1964–70
- Abdallah Liegeon – AS Monaco, Strasbourg – 1981–87, 1988–89
- Julien López – Paris FC – 2025–26

=== M ===
- Raïs M'Bolhi – Rennes – 2017–18
- Rabah Madjer – RC Paris – 1984–85
- Maamar Mamouni – Le Havre – 1996–99
- Aïssa Mandi – Reims, Lille – 2012–16, 2024–26
- Anthony Mandrea – Nice, Angers – 2013–14, 2021–22
- Faouzi Mansouri – Nîmes Olympique, Montpellier – 1974–80, 1981–82
- Yazid Mansouri – Le Havre, Lorient – 1997–2000, 2002–03, 2006–10
- Mohamed Maouche – Reims – 1956–58, 1960–61
- Karim Maroc – Lyon, Angers, Tours, Brest – 1976–85
- Abdelkader Mazouz – Nîmes Olympique – 1957–58
- Mohamed Medehbi – Limoges – 1960–61
- Abdeljalil Medioub – Bordeaux – 2021–22
- Carl Medjani – Metz, Lorient, Ajaccio, Valenciennes FC – 2005–07, 2011–14
- Abderrahmane Meftah – Toulouse FC (1937), Toulon – 1954–55, 1959–60
- Mourad Meghni – Sochaux – 2005–06
- Rachid Mekhloufi – Saint-Étienne, Bastia – 1954–58, 1963–70
- Mehdi Méniri – AS Nancy, Troyes, Metz – 1997–2006
- Walid Mesloub – Lorient – 2014–17
- **Rafik Messali** – **Toulouse** – 2024–
- Mohamed Mezarra – Lille – 1964–68
- Rafik Mezriche – Strasbourg – 1997–2002
- Ahmed Mihoubi – Sète, Toulouse FC (1937), Lyon – 1946–55
- Mehdi Mostefa – Ajaccio, Lorient, Bastia – 2011–17

=== N ===
- Rachid Natouri – Metz – 1970–72
- Omar Nekkache – Marseille – 1950–52
- Mohamed Nemeur – Le Havre, Saint-Étienne – 1945–47

=== O ===
- Abdelhakim Omrani – Lens – 2008–11
- Billel Omrani – Marseille – 2011–13, 2014–15
- Abdelnasser Ouadah – AS Nancy, Ajaccio, Metz, Sedan – 1998–2000, 2002–07
- Bilal Ouali – Reims – 2012–13
- Amokrane Oualiken – Nîmes Olympique – 1958–60
- Ahmed Oudjani – Lens, Sedan – 1958–60, 1962–65, 1966–67
- Chérif Oudjani – Lens, Laval, Sochaux – 1983–90
- Alexandre Oukidja – Strasbourg, Metz – 2017–18, 2019–22, 2023–24
- Adam Ounas – Bordeaux, Nice, Lille – 2015–17, 2019–20, 2022–24

=== P ===
- Mehdi Puch – Ajaccio – 2022–23

=== R ===
- Amar Rouaï – Angers – 1957–58, 1962–63

=== S ===
- Idriss Saadi – Saint-Étienne, Strasbourg – 2010–14, 2017–19, 2020–21
- Hakim Saci – Guingamp, Metz – 2001–04
- Moussa Saïb – Auxerre, AS Monaco, Lorient – 1992–97, 2000–02
- Rafik Saïfi – Troyes, Istres, Ajaccio, Lorient – 1999–2003, 2004–09
- Mohamed Salem – Sedan – 1960–64, 1967–71
- Youssef Salimi – Nice – 1994–97
- Nordine Sam – Strasbourg – 2002–03
- Ben Sames – Stade Français – 1949–50
- Liazid Sandjak – Paris SG, Nice, Saint-Étienne – 1986–92, 1994–96
- Max Sellal – FC Nancy – 1949–51
- Abdelhamid Skander – Bordeaux – 1954–56
- Islam Slimani – AS Monaco, Lyon, Brest – 2019–23
- Abderrahmane Soukhane – Toulouse FC (1937), Red Star – 1964–68
- Maxime Spano – Toulouse FC – 2014–15

=== T ===
- Mehdi Tahrat – Angers – 2016–18
- Abdelhafid Tasfaout – Auxerre, Guingamp – 1995–98, 2000–02
- Mohamed Tayeb – Bordeaux – 1963–65, 1966–67
- **Yacine Titraoui** – **Lens** – 2026–
- Djamel Tlemçani – Rouen, Toulon – 1982–85
- **Ahmed Touba** – **Le Havre** – 2026–

=== V ===
- Kevin Van Den Kerkhof – Metz – 2023–24

=== Y ===
- Ali Sami Yachir – Montpellier – 2003–04
- Anthar Yahia – Bastia, Nice – 2001–06
- Hassan Yebda – Le Mans – 2006–08

=== Z ===
- Abderraouf Zarabi – Ajaccio – 2003–04
- Akim Zedadka – Clermont, Lille, Auxerre – 2021–23
- Mehdi Zeffane – Lyon, Rennes, Clermont – 2013–19, 2022–24
- Mehdi Zerkane – Bordeaux – 2020–22
- Karim Ziani – Troyes, Sochaux, Marseille – 2001–03, 2006–09
- Mustapha Zitouni – AS Monaco – 1954–58
- Abdelhamid Zouba – Nîmes Olympique – 1963–64
- Edhy Zuliani – Toulouse – 2024–25

== Angola ==
- Jérémie Bela – Dijon, Clermont – 2016–17, 2022–24
- Hélder Costa – Monaco – 2015–16
- Luís Delgado – Metz – 2007–08
- Jordy Gaspar – Lyon – 2016–17
- **Clinton Mata** – **Lyon** – 2023–
- Joseph Nduquidi – Metz – 2023–24, 2025–26
- M'Bala Nzola – Lens – 2024–25

== Argentina ==
=== A ===
- Roberto Aballay – FC Nancy, Metz – 1950–55
- Alberto Acosta – Toulouse FC – 1990–91
- Roberto Alarcón – Marseille – 1950–53
- Daniel Alberto – Paris FC, Lens, Rouen, Laval – 1978–85, 1986–88
- Thiago Almada – Lyon – 2024–25
- Sergio Almirón – Monaco – 2007–08
- Alejandro Alonso – Bordeaux, Monaco, Saint-Étienne – 2005–13
- Norberto Alonso – Marseille – 1976–77
- Antonio Ameijenda – Red Star – 1972–73
- Federico Andrada – Metz – 2014–15
- Aarón Anselmino – Strasbourg – 2025–26
- Osvaldo Ardiles – Paris SG – 1982–83
- José Arias – Stade Français, Troyes – 1953–54, 1955–56
- Juan Carlos Auzoberry – Nice – 1959–64, 1965–67

=== B ===
- Leonardo Balerdi – Marseille – 2020–26
- Valentín Barco – Strasbourg – 2024–26
- Ángel Bargas – Nantes, Metz – 1973–81
- Rolando Barrera – Nice – 1985–87
- Horacio Barrionuevo – Nice – 1966–67
- Pablo Barzola – Caen – 2008–09, 2010–11
- Gonzalo Belloso – Strasbourg – 1999–2001
- Henri Belunza – Excelsior Roubaix, Le Havre – 1933–35, 1945–46
- Darío Benedetto – Marseille – 2019–22
- Walter Benítez – Nice – 2016–22
- Gonzalo Bergessio – Saint-Étienne – 2009–11
- Eduardo Berizzo – Marseille – 1999–2000
- Lucas Bernardi – Marseille, Monaco – 2000–08
- Attilio Bernasconi – Rennes, Lille – 1934–35, 1936–37
- Facundo Bertoglio – Evian – 2013–14
- Claudio Biaggio – Bordeaux – 1996–97
- Carlos Bianchi – Reims, Paris SG, Strasbourg – 1973–80
- Daniel Bilos – Saint-Étienne – 2006–07
- Nicolás Blandi – Evian – 2014–15
- Joaquín Blázquez – Brest – 2022–23
- Mariano Bombarda – Metz – 1996–97
- Humberto Rafael Bravo – Paris FC – 1978–79
- Ruben Bravo – Nice – 1954–57
- José Luis Brown – Brest – 1986–87
- Jorge Burruchaga – Nantes, Valenciennes – 1985–93
- Diego Bustos – Nantes – 1998–2000

=== C ===
- Roberto Cabral – Lille – 1978–81
- Juan Cabrera – Bordeaux – 1979–80
- Darío Cabrol – Toulouse FC – 2000–01
- Pablo Calandria – Marseille – 2000–01
- Gabriel Calderón – Paris SG, Caen – 1987–90, 1992–93
- Juan Calichio – Rennes – 1951–52
- José Angel Cammameri – AS Monaco – 1967–68
- Valentín Carboni – Marseille – 2024–25
- Luis Carniglia – Nice – 1951–52, 1953–55
- Guido Carrillo – Monaco – 2015–18
- Raúl Cascini – Toulouse FC – 2000–01
- Raúl Castronovo – AS Nancy – 1971–74
- Fernando Cavenaghi – Bordeaux – 2007–11
- Mauro Cetto – Nantes, Toulouse FC, Lille – 2001–10, 2011–12
- Pablo Chavarría – Lens, Reims – 2014–15, 2018–19
- Enrique Chazarreta – Avignon – 1975–76
- Ricardo Cherini – Rennes – 1972–74
- Randolfo Cisneros – RC Paris, Strasbourg – 1947–51
- Renato Civelli – Marseille, Nice, Lille – 2005–07, 2008–13, 2015–17
- Sérgio Comba – Nantes – 1998–99
- Raúl Conti – AS Monaco – 1953–56
- Joaquín Correa – Marseille – 2023–24
- Alberto Costa – Montpellier – 2009–10
- Ariel Cozzoni – Nice – 1990–91
- José Luis Cuciuffo – Nîmes Olympique – 1991–93
- Leandro Cufré – AS Monaco – 2006–09
- Hugo Curioni – Nantes, Metz, Troyes – 1974–78
- Darío Cvitanich – Nice – 2012–15

=== D ===
- Fernando D'Amico – Lille OSC, Le Mans – 2000–04
- Patricio D'Amico – Metz – 2000–01
- Omar da Fonseca – Tours, Paris SG, AS Monaco, Toulouse FC – 1982–83, 1984–90
- Osvaldo Dandru – Nice – 1959–64
- Héctor De Bourgoing – Nice, Bordeaux – 1959–69
- **Mateo Del Blanco** – **Strasbourg** – 2026–
- César Delgado – Lyon – 2007–11
- Eduardo Di Loreto – Le Havre, Toulouse FC (1937) – 1953–54, 1955–58
- Ángel Di María – Paris SG – 2015–22
- Ramón Díaz – AS Monaco – 1989–91
- Franco Dolci – Nice – 2003–06
- Jorge Domínguez – Nice, Toulon – 1985–88
- Sebastián Dubarbier – Lorient – 2009–12

=== E ===
- Juan Eluchans – Caen – 2007–09
- Juan Esnáider – Ajaccio – 2002–03
- Juán Esposto – Antibes – 1936–37
- Mario Evaristo – Antibes – 1936–38

=== F ===
- Néstor Fabbri – Nantes, Guingamp – 1998–2003
- Jesus Fandino – Metz – 1972–73
- José Farías – RC Paris, Strasbourg, Red Star – 1962–70
- Augusto Fernández – Saint-Étienne – 2009–10
- Brian Fernández – Metz – 2017–18
- Eduardo Flores – AS Nancy – 1972–73
- José Oscar Florindo – FC Nancy – 1961–63
- Juan Pablo Francia – Bordeaux – 2001–07
- Fabricio Fuentes – Guingamp – 2003–04
- Esteban Fuertes – Lens – 2000–01

=== G ===
- Nicolás Gaitán – Lille – 2019–20
- Marcelo Gallardo – AS Monaco, Paris SG – 1999–2003, 2007–08
- Diego Garay – Strasbourg – 1999–2000
- Claudio García – Lyon – 1989–90
- Pascual Garrido – Bastia – 1997–98
- Orlando Gauthier – FC Nancy, Lille OSC, Aix – 1960–63, 1964–65, 1967–68
- Santiago Gentiletti – Brest – 2011–12
- Miguel Giachello – Troyes – 1975–76
- Ernesto Gianella – Reims, AS Monaco, Nîmes Olympique – 1963–65, 1969–70
- Christian Giménez – Marseille – 2005–06
- Diego Gómez – Angers – 2015–16
- Pancho Gonzales – Nice – 1951–61
- Lucho González – Marseille – 2009–12
- Mario Gordiano – Stade Français – 1966–67
- Sergio Goycochea – Brest – 1992
- Andrés Grande – Bastia – 1998–99

=== H ===
- Gabriel Heinze – Paris SG, Marseille – 2001–04, 2009–11
- Ramón Heredia – Paris SG – 1977–79
- Mariano Herrón – Montpellier – 1998–99
- **Santiago Hidalgo** – **Toulouse** – 2025–
- Jorge Higuaín – Brest – 1987–88

=== I ===
- Hugo Ibarra – AS Monaco – 2003–04
- Mauro Icardi – Paris SG – 2019–22

=== J ===
- Victor Hugo Jarra – Red Star – 1974–75

=== K ===
- Juan Krupoviesa – Marseille – 2007–08

=== L ===
- Hugo Lamanna – CA Paris – 1937–38
- Pedro Lara – Le Havre – 1952–53
- César-Auguste Laraignée – Reims, Laval – 1972–79
- Miguel Ángel Lauri – Sochaux – 1936–39
- Ezequiel Lavezzi – Paris SG – 2012–16
- Giovani Lo Celso – Paris SG – 2016–18
- Gabriel Loeschbor – Rennes – 2002–04
- Alex Lombardini – Le Havre – 1951–54
- Lisandro López – Lyon – 2009–13
- Juan Carlos Lorenzo – FC Nancy – 1952–54

=== M ===
- Hector Maison – Nice, Lyon – 1961–64, 1965–69
- Emanuel Mammana – Lyon – 2016–17
- Damián Manso – Bastia – 2001–02
- Alberto Márcico – Toulouse FC – 1985–92
- Ángel Marcos – Nantes – 1971–75
- Robert Marteleur – Lyon – 1959–60
- Joaquim Martinez – Laval – 1977–78
- Javier Mazzoni – Nantes – 1996–97
- Facundo Medina – Lens, Marseille – 2020–26
- Hernán Medina – Lorient – 2001–02
- Mario Rubén Mendoza – Nîmes Olympique – 1973–74
- Lionel Messi – Paris SG – 2021–23
- Guido Milán – Metz – 2014–15, 2016–17
- Ignacio Miramón – Lille – 2023–24
- José Ismael Montagnoli – Sochaux, Metz – 1951–52, 1953–54
- Daniel Montenegro – Marseille – 1999–00
- Ricardo Montivero – Troyes – 1973–74
- Nestor Mourglia – Lyon – 1976–77
- Aurelio Moyano – FC Nancy – 1962–63
- Oscar Muller – Nantes, Rennes – 1974–84, 1985–86
- Ramon Muller – Sochaux, Strasbourg, Nantes – 1961–62, 1962–68
- Rubén Muñoz – Red Star, Strasbourg, Ajaccio – 1965–68
- Alberto Muro – Sochaux, Nice, FC Nancy – 1951–59, 1960–62

=== N ===
- Ricardo-Horacio Neumann – Bastia – 1974–76
- Raúl Nogués – Marseille, Monaco, Nice, Saint-Étienne – 1974–82

=== O ===
- Lucas Ocampos – Monaco, Marseille – 2013–16, 2017–19
- Julio Olarticoechea – Nantes – 1986–87
- Delio Onnis – Reims, Monaco, Tours, Toulon – 1971–76, 1977–86
- Lucas Orbán – Bordeaux – 2013–14

=== P ===
- José Luis Palomino – Metz – 2014–15
- **Joaquín Panichelli** – **Strasbourg** – 2025–
- Leandro Paredes – Paris SG – 2018–23
- Javier Pastore – Paris SG – 2011–18
- José Pastoriza – AS Monaco – 1973–76
- Ignacio Peña – Reims, Rouen – 1973–75, 1977–78
- Gabriel Peñalba – Lorient – 2009–10
- José Perez – RC Paris – 1938–39
- Miguel Pérez – AS Monaco – 1966–67
- Ignacio Piatti – Saint-Étienne – 2005–06
- Osvaldo Piazza – Saint-Étienne – 1974–79
- Diego Placente – Bordeaux – 2008–10
- Gerónimo Poblete – Metz – 2017–18
- Mauricio Pochettino – Paris SG, Bordeaux – 2000–04
- Ezequiel Ponce – Lille – 2017–18
- Antonio Jorge Porcel – Metz – 1952–53

=== R ===
- Nestor Rambert – Lyon – 1969–70
- Víctor Ramos – Nantes, Toulon – 1984–87
- Héctor Rial – Marseille – 1962–63
- Juan Risso – Ajaccio – 1967–70
- Carlos Robelle – Rouen – 1961–64
- Ralando Robinet – Toulon – 1964–65
- Leonardo Rodríguez – Toulon – 1991–92
- Pablo Rodríguez – Nice – 2002–03
- Raul Rodríguez – Bordeaux – 1967–68
- Sebastián Romero – Toulouse FC – 2000–01
- Sergio Romero – Monaco – 2013–14
- Silvio Romero – Rennes – 2013–14
- Julio Hernán Rossi – Nantes – 2005–07
- Rubén Rossi – Toulouse FC – 1997–98
- Marco Ruben – Evian – 2013–14
- Gerónimo Rulli – Montpellier, Marseille – 2019–20, 2024–26

=== S ===
- Emiliano Sala – Bordeaux, Caen, Nantes – 2014–19
- Eduardo Salladare – Stade Français – 1960–62
- Santiago Santamaría – Reims – 1974–79
- Rafael Santos – Nantes, Nice – 1963–69
- Javier Saviola – Monaco – 2004–05
- Raúl Sbarra– Sochaux, Valenciennes – 1936–39
- Juan Simón – AS Monaco, Strasbourg – 1983–88
- Juan Pablo Sorín – Paris SG – 2003–04
- Carlos Sosa – RC Paris – 1952–53, 1954–58
- Franco Sosa – Lorient – 2009–11
- Guillermo Stábile – Red Star – 1935–38

=== T ===
- **Nicolás Tagliafico** – **Lyon** – 2022–
- Fabio Talarico – Cannes – 1990–91
- Carlos Daniel Tapia – Brest – 1987–88
- Aníbal Tarabini – Monaco – 1973–75
- Alberto Tarantini – Bastia, Toulouse FC – 1983–88
- Horacio Tellechea – Metz – 1938–39
- Oscar Tellechea – Sochaux, Metz – 1936–37, 1938–39
- Hector Toublanc – Rennes – 1970–73
- Marcelo Trapasso – Sochaux – 2001–05
- Juan Carlos Trebucq – Troyes – 1973–74
- Óscar Trejo – Toulouse FC – 2013–17
- Jorge Trezeguet – Rouen – 1977–78
- Alfonso Troisi – Marseille – 1974–75
- Enzo Trossero – Nantes – 1979–81
- Víctor Trossero – Nantes, AS Monaco, Montpellier – 1978–82
- Mario Turdó – Rennes – 2000–01
- Eduardo Tuzzio – Marseille – 2001–03

=== V ===
- Valentín Vada – Bordeaux, Saint-Étienne – 2015–19
- Arnaldo Vasquez – RC Paris – 1951–52
- Óscar Vega – FC Nancy – 1950–53
- Juan Carlos Verdeal – Lille OSC – 1950
- **Julián Vignolo** – **Toulouse** – 2025–
- José Luis Villareal – Montpellier – 1995–97
- Carlos Volante – Rennes, Olympique Lillois, CA Paris – 1934–36, 1937–38

=== Y ===
- Héctor Yazalde – Marseille – 1975–77
- Alfredo Yorlano – Grenoble – 1962–63

=== Z ===
- Fernando Zappia – Nancy, Metz, Lille – 1980–90
- Luciano Zavagno – Strasbourg, Troyes – 1997–2002
- Roberto Zywica – Reims, Troyes – 1971–75

== Armenia ==
- Gaël Andonian – Marseille – 2014–15
- Éric Assadourian – Toulouse FC, Lille, Lyon, Guingamp – 1988–97
- Michel Der Zakarian – Nantes, Montpellier – 1981–97
- Apoula Edel – Paris SG – 2009–11

== Australia ==
- Ross Aloisi – Lorient – 1998–99
- Zlatko Arambasic – Metz – 1994–95
- **Patrick Beach** – **Troyes** – 2026–
- Nick Carle – Troyes – 2001–02
- Frank Farina – Strasbourg, Lille – 1992–95
- Denis Genreau – Toulouse – 2022–25
- Eddie Krncevic – Mulhouse – 1989–90
- Mathew Ryan – Lens – 2024–25
- Robbie Slater – Lens – 1991–94
- Mile Sterjovski – Lille – 2000–04
- Mohamed Touré – Reims – 2022–23
- Ned Zelic – Auxerre – 1996–97

== Austria ==
- Josef Adelbrecht – RC Paris – 1934–35
- Anton Artes – Rouen – 1936–37
- Lukas Aurednik – Lens – 1954–56
- Hans Babinek – Cannes – 1933–38
- **Felix Bacher** – **Lyon** – 2026–
- **Samson Baidoo** – **Lens** – 2025–
- Johann Blaschek – Metz, Le Havre – 1936–37, 1945–46
- Engelbert Boesch – Mulhouse – 1936–37
- Karl Böhm – SC Nîmes – 1933–35
- Ernst Bokon – Metz – 1954–56
- Karl Bortoli – Le Havre – 1961–62
- Georg Braun – Rennes – 1935–36
- Theodor Brinek – AS Monaco – 1953–55
- Anton Cay – Antibes, Strasbourg – 1934–38
- Muhammed Cham – Clermont – 2022–24
- Franz Chloupek – Strasbourg – 1935–36
- Josef Chloupek – Marseille – 1934–35
- Franz Cisar – Metz – 1936–37
- Franz Czernicky – Fives – 1932–38
- Flavius Daniliuc – Nice – 2020–22
- Kevin Danso – Lens – 2021–25
- Karl Decker – Sochaux – 1954–56
- Friedrich Donenfeld – Marseille, Red Star – 1937–38, 1945–46
- Leopold Drucker – Marseille – 1933–34
- Adolf Dumser – Antibes – 1932–33
- Karl Durspekt – Rouen – 1936–38
- Leopold Eckenhofer – Rouen, Strasbourg – 1936–38
- Franz Flach – Antibes, Cannes – 1933–35
- Johann Flegel – Mulhouse – 1934–35
- Erwin Forster – AS Monaco – 1956–58
- Franz Freiberger – Metz – 1932–33
- Karl Gall – Mulhouse – 1936–37
- Josef Gottwald – Metz – 1935–36
- Adrian Grbić – Lorient – 2020–24
- Mario Haas – Strasbourg – 1999–2000
- Erich Habitzl – Lens – 1954–56
- Josef Hanke – Excelsior Roubaix – 1936–38
- Franz Hanreiter – Rouen – 1936–38
- Ernst Happel – RC Paris – 1954–56
- Franz Hauswirth – Metz – 1932–33, 1935–36
- Gottfried Havlicek – Strasbourg – 1934–35
- Johann Hoffmann – Strasbourg, Sochaux – 1935–38
- Walter Horak – Sochaux – 1961–62
- Philipp Hosiner – Rennes – 2014–15
- Rudolf Hudecek– Antibes – 1935–38
- Karl Humenberger – Strasbourg, Saint-Étienne – 1936–39
- Franz Jawurek – RC Paris – 1933–34
- Josef Jelinek – CO Roubaix-Tourcoing, Sète – 1945–46, 1948–51
- Camillo Jerusalem – Sochaux, CO Roubaix-Tourcoing, Colmar – 1938–39, 1945–49
- Auguste Jordan – RC Paris, Red Star – 1933–39, 1945–48
- Matthias Kaburek – Metz – 1936–38
- Günter Kaltenbrunner – Nice – 1970–72
- Franz Kekeiss – Cannes – 1933–37
- Alfred Kern – Antibes – 1934–35
- Herwig Kircher – Laval – 1979–81
- Karl Klima – Antibes – 1932–35
- Walter Kogler – Cannes – 1997–98
- Fritz Kominek – Nîmes Olympique, Strasbourg, Lens – 1954–57, 1958–61
- Karl Krebs – Bordeaux, Toulouse FC (1937) – 1946–49
- Rudolf Kumhofer – Mulhouse –1932–33, 1934–36
- Franz Kurka – Marseille – 1933–36
- Karl Lechner – Bordeaux, Rennes – 1945–49
- Roland Linz – Nice – 2004–05
- Ernst Loewinger – Red Star, Mulhouse – 1932–33, 1935–36
- Josef Madlmayer – Cannes – 1933–34
- Anton Marek – Lens, Nice – 1937–39, 1944–47, 1948–49
- Dario Marešić – Reims – 2019–21
- Andreas Matthäus – Metz, Rouen – 1932–33, 1936–39
- Wolfgang Matzky – Valenciennes – 1958–61, 1962–67
- Imre Mausner – Cannes – 1937–39
- Ludwig Mautner – FC Sète, Montpellier – 1944–49
- Josef Mayboeck – Rennes – 1935–37
- Helmut Metzler – Nice – 1970–71
- Johann Moser – Cannes – 1934–35
- Karl Myrka – Metz – 1932–33
- Franz Neubauer – Valenciennes – 1962–63
- Richard Niederbacher – Paris SG – 1984–85
- Robert Pavlicek – Excelsior Roubaix – 1936–38
- Pawanek – Antibes – 1935
- Patrick Pentz – Reims – 2022–23
- Franz Pleyer – Rennes –1933–37, 1945-51
- Adolf Pohan – Antibes, Red Star – 1932–36
- Walter Presch – Hyères, Olympique Lillois, Sète, Red Star, Cannes, Strasbourg – 1932–33, 1934–35, 1936–39, 1945–46
- Eduard Pruss – Antibes – 1937–38
- Alfred Riedl – Metz – 1980–81
- Johann Riegler – Lens – 1961–62
- Franz Sattler – Strasbourg – 1934–35
- Wilhelm Schaden – Hyères, Strasbourg, Sochaux – 1932–33, 1934–37
- Heinz Schilcher – Paris FC, Nîmes Olympique, Strasbourg – 1973–76, 1977–78
- Kurt Schindlauer – Angers – 1956–57
- Josef Schneider – Rennes – 1933–36
- Karl Schott – Mulhouse – 1934–35
- Franz Siedler – Rennes – 1936–37
- Viktor Spechtl – Lens – 1937–39
- Ernst Stojaspal – Strasbourg, Béziers, AS Monaco, Troyes, Metz – 1954–59, 1960–62
- Ludwig Stroh – Rouen – 1936–39
- Ferdinand Swatosch – Mulhouse – 1932–33
- Johann Tandler – Nice – 1933–34
- Ignace Tax – Saint-Étienne – 1938–39, 1944–45
- Adolf Vogel – Excelsior Roubaix – 1937–38
- Wackt – Rennes – 1933–34
- Georg Waitz – Lens – 1937–38
- Johann Wana – Strasbourg – 1936–37
- Franz Weselik – Mulhouse – 1934–37
- Imre Windner – Olympique Lillois, Valenciennes – 1933–38
- Heinrich Witasky – Le Havre – 1938–39, 1946–47
- Anton Witschel – Fives – 1932–33
- Siegfried Zwiebel – Metz – 1937–38

== References and notes ==
=== Books ===
- Barreaud, Marc (1998). Dictionnaire des footballeurs étrangers du championnat professionnel français (1932-1997). L'Harmattan, Paris. ISBN 2-7384-6608-7.
- Tamás Dénes; Pál Peterdi; Zoltán Rochy; József Selmeci (1999). Kalandozó magyar labdarúgók. ISBN 963-85967-0-8.

=== Club pages ===
- AJ Auxerre former players
- AJ Auxerre former players
- Girondins de Bordeaux former players
- Girondins de Bordeaux former players
- Les ex-Tangos (joueurs), Stade Lavallois former players
- Olympique Lyonnais former players
- Olympique de Marseille former players
- FC Metz former players
- AS Monaco FC former players
- Ils ont porté les couleurs de la Paillade... Montpellier HSC Former players
- AS Nancy former players
- FC Nantes former players
- Paris SG former players
- Red Star Former players
- Red Star former players
- Stade de Reims former players
- Stade Rennais former players
- CO Roubaix-Tourcoing former players
- AS Saint-Étienne former players
- Sporting Toulon Var former players

=== Others ===
- stat2foot
- footballenfrance
- French Clubs' Players in European Cups 1955-1995, RSSSF
- Finnish players abroad, RSSSF
- Italian players abroad, RSSSF
- Romanians who played in foreign championships
- Swiss players in France, RSSSF
- EURO 2008 CONNECTIONS: FRANCE, Stephen Byrne Bristol Rovers official site

== Notes ==
1. Born in Belgium
2. Born in Cameroon
3. Born in Croatia (then part of SFR Yugoslavia)
4. Born in Czech Republic (then part of the Czechoslovakia)
5. Born in England
6. Born in France
7. Born in Guinea
8. Born in Italy
9. Born in Kosovo (then part of SFR Yugoslavia)
10. Born in Kosovo (then part of Kingdom of Yugoslavia)
11. Born in Spain
12. Born in Switzerland
13. Born in Tunisia
14. Capped for the France national football team
15. Capped for the France national football B team
16. Capped for the France national under-21 football team
17. Capped for the France national under-20 football team
18. Capped for the France national under-19 football team
19. Capped for the France national under-18 football team
20. Capped for the France national under-17 football team
21. Capped for the France national under-16 football team
22. Capped for the Portugal national football team
23. Capped for the Portugal national under-23 football team
24. Capped for the Portugal national under-21 football team
25. Capped for the Portugal national under-20 football team
26. Capped for the Portugal national under-19 football team
27. Capped for the Portugal national under-18 football team
28. Capped for the Portugal national under-17 football team
29. Capped for the Portugal national under-16 football team
30. Capped for the Spain national under-17 football team
31. Capped for the Spain national under-16 football team
32. Capped for the Switzerland national under-21 football team
33. Capped for the Switzerland national under-20 football team
34. Capped for the Switzerland national under-19 football team
35. Capped for the Switzerland national under-18 football team
36. Capped for the Switzerland national under-17 football team
37. Capped for the Switzerland national under-16 football team
38. Capped for the Switzerland national under-15 football team
