= 2025 Unión de Santa Fe season =

Unión de Santa Fe
2025 season
- President: Luis Spahn
- Manager: Kily González (until 14 April); Leonardo Madelón (from 27 April)
- Primera División: Pre-season
- Copa Argentina: Pre-season
- Copa Sudamericana: Group stage
- Average home league attendance: 26,491
Home colours	Away colours	Third colours

The 2025 season is the 117th for Club Atlético Unión de Santa Fe and their 13th consecutive season in the Primera División. The club will also take part in the Copa Argentina and Copa Sudamericana.

== Squad ==
=== Players ===
Note: Flags indicate national team as defined under FIFA eligibility rules; some limited exceptions apply. Players may hold more than one non-FIFA nationality.

No.	Pos.	Nation	Player
1	GK	ARG	Matías Tagliamonte
3	DF	ARG	Claudio Corvalán (captain)
7	FW	ARG	Franco Fragapane
8	MF	SYR	Ezequiel Ham
10	MF	ARG	Lionel Verde
13	DF	ARG	Valentín Fascendini
14	DF	ARG	Bruno Pittón
16	MF	ARG	Mauricio Martínez (on loan from Rosario Central)
18	FW	ARG	Lucas Gamba
19	FW	ECU	José Angulo
20	MF	ARG	Mateo Del Blanco

No.	Pos.	Nation	Player
22	DF	ARG	Francisco Gerometta
24	DF	ARG	Rafael Profini
25	GK	URU	Thiago Cardozo
26	DF	ARG	Juan Pablo Ludueña
28	MF	ARG	Mauro Pittón
30	FW	ARG	Jerónimo Dómina
32	DF	ARG	Nicolás Paz
34	DF	ARG	Franco Pardo
35	DF	ARG	Lautaro Vargas
40	GK	ARG	Lucas Meuli
—	MF	ARG	Julián Palacios
—	DF	ARG	Gastón Arturia

=== Transfers In ===
Pos.	Player	Transferred from	Fee	Date	Source
MF	(Syria) Ezequiel Ham	(Argentina) Independiente Rivadavia	Free	4 January 2025	
FW	(Ecuador) José Enrique Angulo	(Ecuador) Delfín	Free	7 January 2025	
GK	(Uruguay) Thiago Cardozo	(Uruguay) Peñarol	Free	13 January 2025	
FW	(Argentina) Cristian Tarragona	(Argentina) Talleres	Free	12 June 2025	
FW	(Argentina) Tomás González	(Argentina) Ferro	Loan return	18 June 2025	
DF	(Uruguay) Emiliano Álvarez	(Uruguay) Cerro	Free	8 July 2025	
DF	(Uruguay) Maizon Rodríguez	(Uruguay) Juventud de Las Piedras	Free	22 July 2025	

=== Transfers Out ===
Pos.	Player	Transferred to	Fee	Date	Source
FW	(Argentina) Tomás González	(Argentina) Ferro	Loan	15 January 2025	
FW	(Uruguay) Adrián Balboa	(Argentina) Racing	€776,000	17 January 2025	
MF	(Syria) Ezequiel Ham	(Brazil) Atlético Goianiense	Contract terminated	11 June 2025	
FW	(Argentina) Tomás González	(Argentina) Arsenal de Sarandí	Loan	19 June 2025	
FW	(Ecuador) José Enrique Angulo	(Ecuador) Emelec	Contract terminated	20 June 2025 (Note: The announcement date of his signing with Emelec.)	
GK	(Uruguay) Thiago Cardozo	(Argentina) Belgrano	Loan	4 July 2025	
MF	(Argentina) Lionel Verde	(Russia) CSKA Moscow	Loan	30 July 2025	

== Exhibition matches ==
11 January 2025	Unión (Argentina)	1–3	(Chile) Universidad Católica

17 January 2025	Unión (Argentina)	2–1	(Argentina) Atlético Tucumán

== Competitions ==
=== Overall record ===
Competition	First match	Last match	Starting round	Record							
Competition	First match	Last match	Starting round	Pld	W	D	L	GF	GA	GD	Win %
Primera División	25 January 2025		Matchday 1	0	0	0	0	0	0	+0	—
Copa Argentina				0	0	0	0	0	0	+0	—
Copa Sudamericana	2 April 2025		Group stage	0	0	0	0	0	0	+0	—
Total				0	0	0	0	0	0	+0	—

Source: Competitions

=== Primera División ===
==== Torneo Apertura ====
===== League table =====
Pos	Team	Pld	W	D	L	GF	GA	GD	Pts
11	Central Córdoba (SdE)	16	5	3	8	21	22	−1	18
12	Belgrano	16	3	8	5	13	23	−10	17
13	Aldosivi	16	4	3	9	18	28	−10	15
14	Banfield	16	3	5	8	14	19	−5	14
15	Unión	16	3	5	8	11	17	−6	14

Source: AFA

===== Results by round =====
Round	1
Ground	A
Result	
Position	

A = Away; H = Home; W = Win; D = Draw; L = Loss

===== Matches =====
25 January 2025 1	Estudiantes	3–1	Unión	La Plata
19:15 UTC−3	Palacios 8'; Tobio Burgos 11'; Ascacíbar 21'	Report	Verde 80'	Stadium: Estadio Jorge Luis Hirschi

29 January 2025 2	Unión	1–1	Boca Juniors	Santa Fe
19:15 UTC−3	Fragapane 90+1'	Report	Saracchi 4'	Stadium: 15 de Abril; Referee: Pablo Echavarría

3 February 2025 3	Tigre	1–0	Unión	Victoria
19:15 UTC−3	Paz 42'	Report		Stadium: Estadio José Dellagiovanna

7 February 2025 4	Unión	0–1	Argentinos Juniors	Santa Fe
22:15 UTC−3			Oroz 6'	Stadium: Estadio 15 de Abril

13 February 2025 5	Unión	0–0	Instituto	Santa Fe
22:15 UTC−3		Report		Stadium: Estadio 15 de Abril

17 February 2025 6	Huracán	1–0	Unión	Buenos Aires
--:-- UTC−3	Miljevic 51' (pen.)	Report		Stadium: Estadio Tomás Adolfo Ducó

1 March 2025 7	Unión	1–0	Gimnasia	Santa Fe
21:30 UTC−3	Verde 81'	Report		Stadium: Estadio 15 de Abril

10 March 2025 8	Independiente Rivadavia	2–0	Unión	Mendoza
21:15 UTC−3	Sequeira 38' (pen.), 55'	Report		Stadium: Estadio Bautista Gargantini

17 March 2025 9	Unión	3–1	Banfield	Santa Fe
21:30 UTC−3	Ezequiel Ham 45+2'; Estigarribia 79'; Díaz 90+4'	Report	Adoryan 49'	Stadium: Estadio 15 de Abril

16 March 2025 10	Unión	0–1	Racing	Santa Fe
21:00 UTC−3			Martínez 59'	Stadium: Estadio 15 de Abril

27 March 2025 11	Aldosivi	2–1	Unión	Mar del Plata
15:30 UTC−3	Torres 18'; Leiva 73'	Report	Gamba 89'	Stadium: Estadio José María Minella

6 April 2025 12	Unión	1–0	Central Córdoba	Santa Fe
15:30 UTC−3	Gamba 30'	Report		Stadium: Estadio 15 de Abril

14 April 2025 13	Defensa y Justicia	0–0	Unión	Gobernador Costa
--:-- UTC−3		Report		Stadium: Estadio Norberto "Tito" Tomaghello

18 April 2025 14	Unión	1–1	Newell's Old Boys	Santa Fe
21:30 UTC−3	Gamba 11'	Report	González 16'	Stadium: Estadio 15 de Abril

28 April 2025 15	Barracas Central	2–1	Unión	Buenos Aires
15:00 UTC−3	Candia 43'; Bruera 86'	Report	Palacios 33'	Stadium: Estadio Claudio Chiqui Tapia

2 May 2025 16	Unión	1–1	Belgrano	Santa Fe
18:00 UTC−3	Gamba 38'	Report	Fernández 1'	Stadium: Estadio 15 de Abril

==== Torneo Clausura ====
===== League table =====
Pos	Team	Pld	W	D	L	GF	GA	GD	Pts	Qualification
1	Boca Juniors	16	8	5	3	28	12	+16	29	Advance to round of 16
2	Unión	16	6	7	3	20	13	+7	25	Advance to round of 16
3	Racing	16	7	4	5	16	13	+3	25	Advance to round of 16
4	Central Córdoba (SdE)	16	5	9	2	17	11	+6	24	Advance to round of 16
5	Argentinos Juniors	16	7	3	6	18	13	+5	24	Advance to round of 16

Source: AFA

===== Matches =====
14 July 2025 1	Unión	1–0	Estudiantes	Santa Fe
21:15 UTC−3	Martínez 21'	Report		Stadium: Estadio 15 de Abril

18 July 2025 2	Boca Juniors	1–1	Unión	Buenos Aires
19:30 UTC−3	Di Lollo 85'	Report	Tarragona 64'	Stadium: La Bombonera; Referee: Nazareno Arasa

25 July 2025 3	Unión	0–0	Tigre	Santa Fe
21:15 UTC−3		Report		Stadium: Estadio 15 de Abril

10 August 2025 4	Argentinos Juniors	1–0	Unión	Buenos Aires
20:00 UTC−3	Lescano 44'	Report		Stadium: Diego Armando Maradona

15 August 2025 5	Instituto	0–4	Unión	Córdoba
19:00 UTC−3		Report	Pittón 8', 33'; Estigarribia 11'; Martínez 18'	Stadium: Estadio Monumental Presidente Perón

=== Copa Argentina ===
5 March 2025 Round of 64	Unión	3–1	Colegiales	San Nicolás de los Arroyos
19:15	Dómina 37'; Estigarribia 52'; Verde 90+3'	Report	Cardozo 13' (o.g.)	Stadium: Único de San Nicolás; Referee: Bryan Ferreyra

28 June 2025 Round of 32	Rosario Central	0–0 (1–3 p)	Unión	San Nicolás de los Arroyos
13:00		Report		Stadium: Único de San Nicolás; Referee: Darío Herrera
	Penalties
	Malcorra (penalty scored); Módica (penalty missed); Duarte (penalty missed); Sández (penalty missed)		(penalty scored) Martínez; (penalty scored) Pittón; (penalty missed) Estigarribia; (penalty scored) Verde

28 August 2025 Round of 16	Unión	0–0 (3–4 p)	River Plate	Mendoza
21:15		Report		Stadium: Malvinas Argentinas; Referee: Andrés Gariano
	Penalties
	Martínez (penalty scored); Pittón (penalty scored); Gamba (penalty missed); Fascendini (penalty missed); Colazo (penalty scored)		(penalty scored) Quintero; (penalty scored) Borja; (penalty scored) Colidio; (penalty missed) Martínez Quarta; (penalty scored) Montiel

=== Copa Sudamericana ===
==== Group stage ====
Pos	Team	Pld	W	D	L	GF	GA	GD	Pts	Qualification
1	(Ecuador) Mushuc Runa	6	5	1	0	12	4	+8	16	Advance to round of 16
2	(Chile) Palestino	6	3	0	3	9	9	0	9	Advance to knockout round play-offs
3	(Brazil) Cruzeiro	6	1	2	3	5	7	−2	5	
4	(Argentina) Unión	6	1	1	4	2	8	−6	4	

Source: CONMEBOL
Rules for classification: 1) Points; 2) Goal difference; 3) Goals scored; 4) Away goals scored; 5) CONMEBOL ranking.

1 April 2025 1	Unión (Argentina)	1–0	(Brazil) Cruzeiro	Santa Fe
19:00 UTC−3	Díaz 90+4'	Report		Stadium: Estadio 15 de Abril; Attendance: 10,811; Referee: Andrés Matonte (Uruguay)

9 April 2025 2	Palestino (Chile)	2–0	(Argentina) Unión	Santiago, Chile
18:00 UTC−4	Carrasco 12' (pen.); Marabel 90+6'	Report		Stadium: Estadio Nacional Julio Martínez Prádanos (Note: Palestino play their home matches at Estadio Nacional Julio Martínez Prádanos, Santiago instead of their regular stadium Estadio Municipal de La Cisterna, Santiago which did not meet CONMEBOL requirements.); Referee: Carlos Benítez (Paraguay)

23 April 2025 3	Mushuc Runa (Ecuador)	3–0	(Argentina) Unión	Riobamba, Ecuador
21:00 UTC−5	Orejuela 3'; Caicedo 52'; Penilla 90+1'	Report		Stadium: Estadio Olímpico Fernando Guerrero (Note: Mushuc Runa play their home matches at Estadio Olímpico Fernando Guerrero, Riobamba (originally scheduled at Estadio Banco Guayaquil, Quito instead of their regular stadium Estadio COAC Mushuc Runa, Ambato which did not meet CONMEBOL requirements.); Referee: Augusto Menéndez (Peru)

7 May 2025 4	Unión (Argentina)	1–2	(Chile) Palestino	Santa Fe
19:00 UTC−3	Gamba 49'	Report	Marabel 84', 88'	Stadium: Estadio 15 de Abril; Referee: Derlis López (Paraguay)

13 May 2025 5	Unión (Argentina)	0–1	(Ecuador) Mushuc Runa	Santa Fe
21:30 UTC−3		Report	Caicedo 45+1'	Stadium: Estadio 15 de Abril; Referee: Yender Herrera (Venezuela)

28 May 2025 6	Cruzeiro (Brazil)	0–0	(Argentina) Unión	Belo Horizonte, Brazil
21:30 UTC−3		Report		Stadium: Mineirão; Referee: Blas Romero (Paraguay)
