= Rafael Profini =

Footballer (born 2003)

Personal information
- Full name: Rafael Profini
- Date of birth: 9 September 2003 (age 23)
- Place of birth: San José de la Esquina, Argentina
- Height: 1.84 m (6 ft 0 in)
- Position: Defensive midfielder

Team information
- Current team: FC Kharkiv
- Number: 6

Youth career
- Centenario
- Newell's Old Boys
- Belgrano
- 2020–2023: Unión de Santa Fe

Senior career*
Years	Team	Apps	(Gls)
2023–2026	Unión de Santa Fe	37	(1)
2026–	Metalist 1925 Kharkiv	1	(0)
- * Club domestic league appearances and goals

Rafael Profini (born 9 September 2003) is a professional footballer who plays as a winger for Ukrainian Premier League club FC Kharkiv.

A native of San José de la Esquina, Rafael Profini started his career in Centenario, had a brief stint through the Newell's youth system, and then returned to his hometown to join Belgrano.

In 2020, after passing a test, he joined Unión de Santa Fe, playing for youth squads (grassroots division). In 2023, he began playing in the reserve team, and just six months later, coach Cristian González added him to practices with the professional squad. Although he did not get official minutes that year, he was part of the substitutes' bench on several occasions and was also a starter in the team that was crowned champion of the Santa Fe Cup. All this led the club's management to sign his first contract.

In 2024, he made his long-awaited debut: on November 9, in the 1–0 home victory over Atlético Tucumán, he entered as a substition on the 36th minute in place of Claudio Corvalán. At the beginning of 2025, he was very close to going on loan to Gimnasia y Esgrima de Jujuy in search of minutes; however, at the last minute he preferred to stay and fight at the request of the coach, who made a key decision for his career: to reconvert him into a central midfielder. It was in this place on the field where Profini surprised with his performance and ended up consolidating himself as a starter.

On 30 June 2026, Ukrainian club FC Kharkiv (recently renamed Metalist 1925) signed the young Argentine player.
