= Mohamed Soukhane =

Algerian footballer (1931–2021)

Personal information
- Date of birth: 12 October 1931
- Place of birth: El Biar, French Algeria
- Date of death: 2 November 2021 (aged 90)
- Height: 1.71 m (5 ft 7 in)
- Position: Defender

Senior career*
Years	Team	Apps	(Gls)
1956–1964	Le Havre		

International career
1958–1962	FLN football team		
1963–1964	Algeria	6	(0)
- * Club domestic league appearances and goals

Mohamed Soukhane (12 October 1931 – 2 November 2021) was an Algerian footballer who played as a defender for Le Havre and the Algeria national team. He also played for the FLN football team, alongside his younger brother Abderrahmane.
