= Lautaro Vargas =

Argentine footballer

Personal information
- Full name: Lautaro Valentín Vargas
- Date of birth: 1 February 2005 (age 21)
- Place of birth: Rosario, Argentina
- Height: 1.73 m (5 ft 8 in)
- Position: Right-back

Team information
- Current team: Unión Santa Fe
- Number: 35

Youth career
- Defensa y Justicia

Senior career*
Years	Team	Apps	(Gls)
2023–2024	Defensa y Justicia	1	(0)
2024–	Unión Santa Fe	73	(0)

International career
2024	Argentina U20	4	(0)
- * Club domestic league appearances and goals as of 17:34, 22 November 2026 (UTC)

Lautaro Valentín Vargas (born 1 February 2005) is an Argentine professional footballer who plays as a right-back for Unión Santa Fe.

== Club career ==
=== Defensa y Justicia ===
Vargas joined the Defensa y Justicia youth setup in 2022 and a few months later trained with the first team. He then moved up to play regularly with the reserve team.

On 28 July the following year, he made his debut for the first team in a 2–0 defeat away to Unión Santa Fe. In the 78th minute, he came on as a substitute for Samuel Lucero.

=== Unión Santa Fe ===
In May 2024, he permanently signed for Unión Santa Fe, and injuries to Federico Vera and Francisco Gerometta led to his appearance in the first team. At the start of the league season, he was in the starting lineup in a 1–0 victory against Banfield. Over the course of the season, he became a regular starter. On 1 April 2025, he made his debut in continental competition in a 1–0 win against Cruzeiro in the Copa Sudamericana.

== Career statistics ==
As of 14 August 2026

Appearances and goals by club, season and competition
Club	Season	League			Cup (Note: Includes Copa Argentina)		Continental		Other		Total	
Club	Season	Division	Goals	Apps	Apps	Goals	Apps	Goals	Apps	Goals	Apps	Goals
Defensa y Justicia	2023	AFA Liga Profesional de Fútbol	1	0	—		—		—		1	0
Unión Santa Fe	2024	AFA Liga Profesional de Fútbol	25	0	—		—		—		25	0
Unión Santa Fe	2025	AFA Liga Profesional de Fútbol	26	0	2	0	6 (Note: Appearances in Copa Sudamericana)	0	—		34	0
Unión Santa Fe	2026	AFA Liga Profesional de Fútbol	21	0	2	0	—		—		23	0
Unión Santa Fe	Total		72	0	4	0	6	0	0	0	82	0
Career total			73	0	4	0	6	0	0	0	83	0
