= Maizon Rodríguez =

Uruguayan footballer (born 2003)

Personal information
- Full name: Álex Maizon Rodríguez González
- Date of birth: 22 May 2003 (age 23)
- Place of birth: Montevideo, Uruguay
- Height: 1.85 m (6 ft 1 in)
- Position: Defender

Team information
- Current team: Krasnodar
- Number: 2

Youth career
- Juventud

Senior career*
Years	Team	Apps	(Gls)
2022–2025	Juventud	37	(3)
2023	→ Estepona (loan)	0	(0)
2025–2026	Unión	32	(1)
2026–	Krasnodar	4	(0)
- * Club domestic league appearances and goals as of 22 November 2026

Álex Maizon Rodríguez González (born 22 May 2003) is a Uruguayan professional footballer who plays as a defender for Russian Premier League club Krasnodar.

== Career ==
As a youth player, Rodríguez joined the youth academy of Juventud at under-16 level and was promoted to the club's senior team in 2022, where he was regarded to have established himself as a regular starter while playing for them and helping them achieve promotion from the second tier to the top flight.

In 2023, he was sent on loan to Spanish side Estepona, where he failed to make a competitive appearance because of work permit complications. During the summer of 2025, he signed for Unión in Argentina, where he wore the number two jersey and was regarded as one of the club's important players. Following his stint there, on 3 September 2026 he signed a four-year contract with Russian outfit Krasnodar

== Style of play ==
Rodríguez plays as a defender and is right-footed. Uruguayan newspaper El Observador wrote in 2025 "a left-sided center-back for Juventud... [he] stands 1.85 meters tall, and is right-footed, yet he is perfectly adapted to playing on the left side".

== Career statistics ==
As of 22 November 2026

Club	Season	League			Cup		Other		Total	
Club	Season	Division	Apps	Goals	Apps	Goals	Apps	Goals	Apps	Goals
Juventud	2022	Uruguayan Segunda División	1	0	1	0	—		2	0
Juventud	2023	Uruguayan Segunda División	1	0	1	0	1 (Note: Appearances in promotion play-offs)	0	3	0
Juventud	2024	Uruguayan Segunda División	15	0	2	0	1	0	18	0
Juventud	2025	Liga AUF Uruguaya	20	3	—		—		20	3
Juventud	Total		37	3	4	0	2	0	43	3
Estepona (loan)	2022–23	Segunda Federación	0	0	—		—		0	0
Unión	2025	AFA Liga Profesional de Fútbol	11	0	1	0	1 (Note: Appearance in Clausura play-offs)	0	13	0
Unión	2026	AFA Liga Profesional de Fútbol	21	1	1	0	2 (Note: Appearances in Apertura play-offs)	0	24	1
Unión	Total		32	1	2	0	3	0	37	1
Krasnodar	2026–27	Russian Premier League	4	0	2	0	—		6	0
Career total			73	4	8	0	5	0	86	4
