= Ricardo Cherini =

Argentinian footballer (1950–2008)

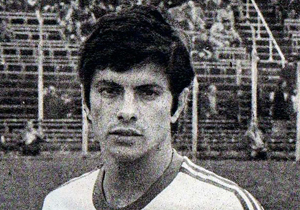
- Cherini in 1975

Personal information
- Full name: Ricardo Daniel Cherini
- Date of birth: 24 April 1950
- Place of birth: Córdoba, Córdoba Province, Argentina
- Date of death: 16 March 2008 (aged 57)
- Place of death: La Calera, Córdoba, Argentina
- Height: 1.65 m (5 ft 5 in)
- Position: Left winger

Youth career
- ???–1966: Libertad

Senior career*
Years	Team	Apps	(Gls)
1967	Talleres		
1970–1972	Instituto		
1972–1975	Stade Rennais	48	(10)
1975–1980	Talleres	149	(37)
- * Club domestic league appearances and goals

Ricardo Daniel Cherini (24 April 1950 – 16 March 2008) was an Argentinian footballer. Nicknamed "Chiquitín", he played for Talleres throughout his domestic career as he also notably played for Stade Rennais abroad in the Ligue 1 in France.

== Career ==
=== Instituto ===
Arriving from Libertad on 11 November 1967, Cherini made his debut for Talleres in a 2–1 victory against Atlético Bell for the Liga Cordobesa. However, he took a hiatus from professional football for the rest of the 1960s. In 1970, he arrived at Instituto following the scouting by club manager Augusto Marcelino Fumero as he made his debut in a friendly against Rosario Central, playing alongside other players such as Carlos Biasutto, José Mesiano, Agustín Balbuena, Aurelio Pascuttini, Alberto Fanesi, Carlos Colman and Raúl Castronovo. During his second season, he would be allowed to be a part of the Starting XI under manager Jorge Omar Pirro. His final season with the club was a success with Cherini being the second highest goalscorer for the club behind Mario Kempes himself as well as being regional champions.

=== Stade Rennais ===
Noticed by Stade Rennais, he was recruited by Jean Prouff in 1972. As soon as he arrived to Brittany however, he wasn't a regular starter, often having to compete with Daniel David and Pierre Dell'Oste. Cherini finally returned to Argentina in 1974, to his region of Córdoba later signed for Talleres once more, making 35 appearances and scoring 6 goals.

=== Talleres ===
Cherini's return to Talleres for the 1975 Campeonato Nacional would mark a golden age for the club as he contributed to the club through his abilities as a left winger with great speed as well as control of the midfield. Under manager Rubén Bravo, the club qualified for the semifinals of the 1976 Campeonato Nacional. During the final match against Colón in the group stage, Talleres needed even just a tie to qualify but would end up losing for a majority of the match due to the loss of three men during the game with the expulsions of Néstor Lucco and José Daniel Valencia with Luis Galván also being injured in the match. When the time was beginning to run out, a pass to goalkeeper Oscar Quiroga would halt their advances as he then passed the ball to Cherini. With his speed exceeding the predictions of the defenders, Colón goalkeeper Oscar Luraschi also couldn't stop Cherini as he scored the equalizer. With similar moments of play against River Plate, Newell’s Old Boys and Independiente, Cherini cemented himself as a club legend with 149 appearances and 37 goals. By the time of his retirement in the 1980 season to work at the metallurgical industry, he helped the club achieve 14 titles and one of the most remembered players of the golden age of Talleres.

== Personal life ==
Cherini later had seven children and had sold a metallurgical workshop. often playing golf as a pastime. During a visit to a gas station in La Calera, Córdoba to oversee a nearby construction project he was overseeing, Cherini suffered a heart attack and died at the age of 57 with the Córdoba Province mourning his passing.
