= Lionel Verde =

Argentine footballer (born 2004)

Personal information
- Full name: Lionel Sebastián Verde
- Date of birth: 18 October 2004 (age 22)
- Place of birth: Santa Fe Province, Argentina
- Height: 1.77 m (5 ft 10 in)
- Position: Midfielder

Team information
- Current team: Baniyas (on loan from Unión)
- Number: 30

Youth career
- –2024: Unión

Senior career*
Years	Team	Apps	(Gls)
2023–	Unión	22	(3)
2025–2026	→ CSKA Moscow (loan)	2	(0)
2026–	→ Baniyas (loan)	0	(0)
- * Club domestic league appearances and goals as of 9 August 2025

Lionel Sebastián Verde (born 18 October 2004) is an Argentine professional footballer who plays as a midfielder for UAE Pro League club Baniyas on loan from Unión.

== Early life ==
Verde was born on 18 October 2004. Born in Santa Fe Province, Argentina, he is a native of the province.

== Career ==
As a youth player, Verde joined the youth academy of Argentine side Unión and was promoted to the club's senior team in 2023. Argentine news website Agenciafe wrote in 2025 that he "demonstrated his worth as a highly desirable prospect" while playing for them. On 14 February 2024, he debuted for them during a 0–0 away draw with Godoy Cruz in the Copa de la Liga Profesional.

During the summer of 2025, he was sent on loan to Russian side CSKA until the end of the 2025–26 season, with an option to buy.

== Career statistics ==
As of 21 October 2025

Club	Season	League			Cup		Continental		Other		Total	
Club	Season	Division	Apps	Goals	Apps	Goals	Apps	Goals	Apps	Goals	Apps	Goals
Unión	2023	Argentine Primera División	0	0	–		–		0	0	0	0
Unión	2024	Argentine Primera División	8	1	0	0	–		5 (Note: Appearances in Copa de la Liga Profesional)	0	13	1
Unión	2025	Argentine Primera División	14	2	2	1	5 (Note: Appearances in Copa Sudamericana)	0	–		21	3
Unión	Total		22	3	2	1	5	0	5	0	34	4
CSKA Moscow (loan)	2025–26	Russian Premier League	2	0	2	0	–		–		4	0
Career total			24	3	4	1	5	0	5	0	38	4
