= FLN football team =

National association football team

- Top scorer: Rachid Mekhloufi
- Home stadium: Various
First colours	Second colours

First international
- Tunisia 1–5 FLN (Algeria) (Tunis, Tunisia; 3 May 1958)

Last international
- Yugoslavia 1–5 FLN (Algeria) (Belgrade, Yugoslavia; 29 March 1961)

Biggest win
- Tunisia 0–8 FLN (Algeria) (Tunis, Tunisia; 15 April 1958); Morocco 0–8 FLN (Algeria) (Casablanca, Morocco; 8 October 1959)

Biggest defeat
- Tianjin XI 5–1 FLN (Algeria) (Tianjin, China; 25 October 1959)

The FLN football team (in Arabic: فريق جبهة التحرير الوطني لكرة القدم, in French: Équipe du FLN de football), also known as Le onze de l'indépendance (English: The eleven of the Independence), was a team made up mainly of professional players in France, who then joined the Algerian independence movement of the National Liberation Front (FLN), and assisted in organizing football matches against national football teams. The FLN linked African football to anti-colonial resistance using the idea of Pan-Africanism as a legitimizing tool and symbol of national identity.

== History ==
The team was founded on 13 April 1958 during the war of independence against France. The role of this team was primarily psychological, in order to show the French metropolitans that even professional footballers were involved in the cause, even to the extent of renouncing their status. Evidently so, in 1958 ten of Algeria's professional football players based in France fled the country, traveling through Switzerland and Italy, to Tunis home of the Provisional Government of the republic of Algeria (GPRA). The departure of the ten players made news all around the world through mainstream media, though their successes were not acknowledged particularly in the United States. There was one setback at the Franco-Swiss border with the arrest of Hassen Chabri of AS Monaco and Mohamed Maouche of Stade Reims. Mohamed Maouche wanted to meet the group in Lausanne, Switzerland, but as he was still in the French army, and had been held up at French borders for a long time, he had to back out when information about the runaway players was published, for fear of being stopped at the borders. He preferred to return to France, where he was spared a court-martial. Hassen Chabri was arrested in Menton on the French-Italian border, where he was the subject of a court hearing. Like most Algerians arrested at the border, he was suspected of smuggling arms and money for the FLN. As he was unable to give the police a convincing explanation, he was imprisoned in Marseille and later convicted of undermining state security. However, he served his sentence in a prison camp in Algiers.

The French authorities easily obtained the non-recognition of the team by FIFA. Despite the prohibition on play, the FLN team engaged in a world tour of about eighty meetings, including Europe, Middle East, Asia and Africa. Of these meetings, the FLN won 55 matches. As Algeria remained one of France's oldest colonies in Africa since the 1830s, these football games were widely used by pro-independence propaganda. The objective of the FLN football team was to deny France the service of key players, heightening international awareness of the Algerian fight for independence and to demonstrate that the FLN had the support of both Algerians at home and those abroad.

The team existed from 1958 to 6 June 1962 when the "national" team was officially disbanded 1962, bequeathing its place in 1963 to its legitimate successor, the Algeria national football team. The overall idea of a national team in exile had its origins in the politicization of football, with the intention to create an arena for the anti-colonial resistance and road to liberation during the war of independence against France. Shortly after, Algeria gained its independence on 5 July 1962.

=== ALN Team ===
A year before the formation of the FLN team, two former Algerian players and coaches decided to train in Tunis, the first selection that would represent Algeria, they are Ahmed Benelfoul and Habib Draoua. In 1956, the team was formed. And in May 1957, the team was approved by the National Liberation Front and decided that it would represent the National Liberation Army as there were players who came from the maquis. The team is mainly composed of amateur players playing in Algeria and Tunisia. The first game was played on 1 June 1957 in Chedly Zouiten Stadium against Tunisia. Between May 1957 and April 1958, they played many matches in the Maghreb and the Middle East to support the independence cause; the team is credited with 42 victories. This selection will contribute to the birth of the formation of the FLN Team a year after its creation.

=== FLN Team's Unique Playing Style ===
The FLN was a unique football team because of their playing style, which was fluid and based on finesse. This approach to the game of football was very different from the norm. The most common form of playing football is based on a very complicated and scientific approach, while the FLN rather focused on fluidity. The FLN football team as stated by Rachid Mekhloufi who was a French football team manager, noted that the FLN used a 4-2-4 system of offense. This system gave players a great amount of flexibility in movement while playing a football game, which proved to be very effective. This offensive style of play used by the FLN team was also seen as entertainment and honorable by spectators. The usual football playing mechanics focus on defensive playing in order to lower the risk of the opposing team scoring a goal. This playing style was the normal way to play football in the 1970s, but not for the FLN team. The FLN team's unique playing style could be noted to lead to the FLN team's popularity and importance in the African struggle for freedom and equality.

== Player selection ==
No.	Pos.	Player	Date of birth (age)	Club prior to FLN (Club after FLN)
	GK	Abderrahman Ibrir	10 November 1919	Marseille (retired)
	GK	Ali Doudou	5 January 1927	USM Bône (USM Annaba)
	GK	Abderrahmane Boubekeur	13 March 1931	Monaco (MC Alger)
	DF	Mustapha Zitouni	19 October 1928	Monaco (VS Chartres)
	DF	Chérif Bouchache	8 May 1929	Le Havre (JSM Skikda)
	DF	Mohamed Soukhane	12 October 1931	Le Havre
	DF	Abdallah Settati	10 April 1932	Bordeaux (unknown)
	DF	Smaïn Ibrir	28 February 1933	Le Havre (retired)
	DF	Dahmane Defnoun	8 May 1936	Angers
	DF	Khaldi Hammadi	unknown	Stade Tunisien (unknown)
	MF	Mohamed Boumezrag (player-manager)	13 June 1921	Colmar (retired)
	MF	Saïd Hadad	30 August 1922	Toulon (retired)
	MF	Mokhtar Arribi	24 February 1924	Avignon (retired)
	MF	Abdelaziz Ben Tifour	25 July 1927	Monaco (USM Alger)
	MF	Hassen Chabri	25 April 1931	Monaco (CS Hammam-Lif)
	MF	Amar Rouaï	9 March 1932	Angers
	MF	Boudjemaa Bourtal	22 August 1933	AS Béziers (retired)
	MF	Kaddour Bekhloufi	7 June 1934	Monaco (USM Bel Abbès)
	MF	Ali Benfadah	10 January 1935	Angers
	MF	Rachid Mekhloufi	12 August 1936	Saint-Étienne (Servette)
	MF	Abdelkader Zerrar	10 January 1934	CS Hammam Lif (unknown)
	FW	Abdelhamid Bouchouk	14 April 1927	Toulouse
	FW	Hamid Zouba	8 June 1930	Chamois Niortais (Grenchen)
	FW	Saïd Brahimi	17 March 1931	Toulouse (JSM Skikda)
	FW	Abdelhamid Kermali	24 April 1931	Lyon (USM Sétif)
	FW	Hocine Bouchache	20 April 1932	Le Havre
	FW	Abdelkader Mazouz	6 August 1932	Nîmes (La Chaux-de-Fonds)
	FW	Saïd Amara	11 March 1933	AS Béziers (Bordeaux)
	FW	Amokrane Oualiken	6 April 1933	Nîmes (MC Alger)
	FW	Mohamed Bourricha	10 October 1934	Nîmes (unknown)
	FW	Abdelkrim Kerroum	25 March 1936	AS Troyes-Savinienne
	FW	Mohamed Maouche	24 April 1936	Reims (Red Star)
	FW	Abderrahmane Soukhane	13 November 1936	Le Havre
	FW	Ahmed Oudjani	19 March 1937	Lens
