= Smaïn Ibrir =

Algerian footballer (1932–2021)

Personal information
- Date of birth: 28 March 1932
- Place of birth: El Biar, French Algeria
- Date of death: 7 July 2021 (aged 89)
- Height: 1.83 m (6 ft 0 in)
- Position: Defender

Senior career*
Years	Team	Apps	(Gls)
1953–1956	JS El Biar		
1956–1958	Le Havre	12	(0)

International career
1958–1962	FLN		
- * Club domestic league appearances and goals

Smaïn Ibrir (Arabic: سماعين إبرير; 28 March 1932 – 7 July 2021) was an Algerian footballer who played as a defender.

== Biography ==
Born into a sporting family, Ibrir was the son of international goalkeeper Abderrahman Ibrir. He played for the Algerian club JS El Biar from 1953 to 1956 before arriving in France in 1956 to play for Le Havre AC in Division 2. He also played for the national team of the National Liberation Front, the Algerian independence movement during the Algerian War. Following Algeria's independence, he coached small teams in the country before retiring from football activities in 1976.

Smaïn Ibrir died on 7 July 2021 at the age of 89.
