= Carlos Trullet =

Argentine footballer and manager

Personal information
- Full name: Carlos Alberto Trullet
- Date of birth: October 21, 1949 (age 77)
- Place of birth: El Trébol, Argentina
- Position: Midfielder

Team information
- Current team: Atlético de Rafaela (manager)

Senior career*
Years	Team	Apps	(Gls)
1969–1970	Estudiantes	?	(?)
1971–1974	Colón	?	(?)
1974	Atlético Regina	?	(?)
1975–1977	Unión	?	(?)
1978	Emelec	42	(0)

Managerial career
- 1990–1991: Unión
- ?: Gimnasia y Esgima (CdU)
- 1995: Patronato
- 1995–1997: Unión
- ?: Quilmes
- 2001–2002: Platense
- 2003–2006: Ben Hur
- 2006–2007: Unión
- 2008–2009: Ferro Carril Oeste
- 2009–2012: Atlético Rafaela
- * Club domestic league appearances and goals

Carlos Alberto Trullet (born 21 October 1949 in El Trébol, Santa Fe) is an Argentine football manager and former player.

== Playing career ==
Trullet started his professional career in 1969 with Estudiantes de La Plata. In his two years with the club, he won two Copa Libertadores (1969, 1970) and one Copa Interamericana (1969).

In 1971, Trullet joined Colón de Santa Fe where he played until 1974. He had a brief spell with Atlético Regina in the Nacional championship of 1974 and then joined Unión de Santa Fe.

In 1978, he joined the Ecuadorian club team Emelec, where he remained until the end of his playing career.

== Titles ==
Season	Team	Title
1969	Estudiantes de La Plata	Copa Libertadores
1969	Estudiantes de La Plata	Copa Interamericana
1970	Estudiantes de La Plata	Copa Libertadores

== Managerial career ==
After retiring from active play, Trullet served as the manager of several clubs in Argentina. Trullet managed Unión de Santa Fe over three separate periods (1990–1991, 1995–1997 and 2006–2007). In his second spell with the club, he coached them to a superlative record and helped them attain the successful promotion to the Argentine Primera in 1996.

Trullet has also served as the manager of Gimnasia y Esgima (CdU), Quilmes, Platense and Ben Hur. During his time as Ben Hur manager he helped the club to secure two promotions, from the regional leagues to the Primera B Nacional (second division).

Trullet also won with Atlético de Rafaela the 2010–11 season of the Primera B Nacional, achieving promotion to "Primera Division".
