= Jerónimo Dómina =

Argentine footballer (born 2005)

Personal information
- Date of birth: 17 October 2005 (age 21)
- Place of birth: Santa Fe, Argentina
- Height: 1.74 m (5 ft 9 in)
- Position: Forward

Team information
- Current team: Tigre (on loan from Cádiz)
- Number: 30

Youth career
- 2009–2023: Unión de Santa Fe

Senior career*
| Years | Team | Apps | (Gls) |
| 2023–2025 | Unión de Santa Fe | 71 | (7) |
| 2026– | Cádiz | 8 | (0) |
| 2026– | → Tigre (loan) | 8 | (4) |
- * Club domestic league appearances and goals as of 17:58, 9 November 2026 (UTC)

Jerónimo Dómina (born 17 October 2005) is an Argentine professional footballer who plays as a forward for Tigre, on loan from Spanish club Cádiz.

== Career ==
=== Unión de Santa Fe ===
Born in Santa Fe, Argentina, Dómina joined Unión de Santa Fe when he was three years old. He made his first team and professional debut on 31 January 2023 in the 0–0 draw against Club Atlético Banfield in Primera División. On 4 July 2023 he scored his first professional goal in a 2–0 win against Gimnasia y Esgrima.

=== Cádiz ===
On 10 December 2025, Spanish Segunda División side Cádiz announced the signing of Dómina until June 2030, effective as of the following 1 January.

== Career statistics ==
As of 7 May 2025.

Club statistics
| Club | Division | League | | | Cup | | Continental | | Total | |
| Club | Division | Season | Apps | Goals | Apps | Goals | Apps | Goals | Apps | Goals |
|---|---|---|---|---|---|---|---|---|---|---|
| Unión de Santa Fe | Primera División | 2023 | 21 | 3 | 14 | 0 | — | | 35 | 3 |
| Unión de Santa Fe | Primera División | 2024 | 17 | 4 | 8 | 0 | — | | 25 | 4 |
| Unión de Santa Fe | Primera División | 2025 | 12 | 0 | 1 | 1 | 4 | 0 | 17 | 1 |
| Career total | | | 50 | 7 | 23 | 1 | 4 | 0 | 77 | 8 |
