= Mohamed Maouche (footballer, born 1936) =

Algerian footballer (born 1936)

Personal information
- Date of birth: 24 February 1936 (age 90)
- Place of birth: Algeria
- Position: Striker

Senior career*
Years	Team	Apps	(Gls)
–1956	AS Saint Eugène		
1956–1958	Reims		
1959–1960	Red Star		
1960–1961	Reims		
1961–1962	AS Saint Eugène		
1964–1965	ES Mostaganem		

International career
- FLN

Managerial career
- 1964–1965: ES Mostaganem
- 1966: USM Alger
- 1975: USM Blida
- 1981–1982: Algeria (assist. manager)
- * Club domestic league appearances and goals

Mohamed Maouche (born 24 February 1936) is an Algerian former football manager and player. He managed Algeria.

== Career ==
Maouche played in the French Ligue 1 and for the FLN football team and was regarded as one of the most important Algerian players during the later 1950s and early 1960s.
