= Thiago Cardozo =

Uruguayan footballer (born 1996)

Personal information
- Full name: Thiago Gastón Cardozo Brugman
- Date of birth: 31 July 1996 (age 30)
- Place of birth: Juan Lacaze, Uruguay
- Height: 1.82 m (6 ft 0 in)
- Position: Goalkeeper

Team information
- Current team: Belgrano (on loan from Unión Santa Fe)
- Number: 25

Youth career
- Peñarol

Senior career*
Years	Team	Apps	(Gls)
2018–2025	Peñarol	37	(0)
2021	→ Deportivo Maldonado (loan)	10	(0)
2024	→ Unión Santa Fe (loan)	29	(0)
2025–	Unión Santa Fe	14	(0)
2025–	→ Belgrano (loan)	36	(0)

International career^{‡}
2012–2013	Uruguay U17	26	(0)
2014–2015	Uruguay U20	6	(0)
2026–	Uruguay	1	(0)
- * Club domestic league appearances and goals as of 17:51, 9 July 2026 (UTC) ‡ National team caps and goals as of 17:00, 6 October 2026 (UTC)

Thiago Gastón Cardozo Brugman (born 31 July 1996) is a Uruguayan professional footballer who plays as a goalkeeper for AFA Liga Profesional de Fútbol club Belgrano, on loan from Unión Santa Fe, and the Uruguay national team.

== Club career ==
A youth academy graduate of Peñarol, Cardozo made his professional debut on 5 May 2018 in a 4–1 league win against Defensor Sporting. In April 2021, he joined Deportivo Maldonado on a season long loan deal.

== International career ==
Cardozo has represented Uruguay at various youth levels. He was part of Uruguay's squads at the 2013 South American U-17 Championship, 2013 FIFA U-17 World Cup, 2015 South American U-20 Championship and the 2015 FIFA U-20 World Cup.

In September 2026, Cardozo received his first call-up to the Uruguay national team. He made his international debut on 6 October 2026 in a 6–1 victory over India.

== Career statistics ==
=== Club ===
As of 2 November 2022

Club	Season	League			Cup		Continental		Other		Total	
Club	Season	Division	Apps	Goals	Apps	Goals	Apps	Goals	Apps	Goals	Apps	Goals
Peñarol	2018	Uruguayan Primera División	3	0	—		0	0	0	0	3	0
Peñarol	2019	Uruguayan Primera División	4	0	—		1 (Note: Appearance in Copa Libertadores)	0	1 (Note: Appearance in Torneo Clausura decider)	0	6	0
Peñarol	2020	Uruguayan Primera División	4	0	—		0	0	—		4	0
Peñarol	2022	Uruguayan Primera División	2	0	5	0	0	0	0	0	7	0
Peñarol	Total		13	0	5	0	1	0	1	0	20	0
Deportivo Maldonado (loan)	2021	Uruguayan Primera División	10	0	—		—		—		10	0
Career total			23	0	5	0	1	0	1	0	30	0

=== International ===
As of match played 6 October 2026

Appearances and goals by national team and year
National team	Year	Apps	Goals
Uruguay	2026	1	0
Total		1	0

== Honours ==
Belgrano

- Primera División: 2026 Apertura
