= Kaddour Bekhloufi =

Algerian footballer (1934–2019)

Personal information
- Date of birth: 7 June 1934
- Place of birth: Oran, French Algeria
- Date of death: 26 July 2019 (aged 85)
- Place of death: Oran, Algeria
- Position: Forward

Youth career
- 1946–1948: CAL Oran

Senior career*
Years	Team	Apps	(Gls)
1948–1954	CAL Oran	–	(–)
1954–1957	AS Marine d'Oran	–	(–)
1957–1958	Monaco	5	(0)
1962–1963	USM Bel Abbès	–	(–)
1963–1969	ASM Oran	–	(–)
1969–1970	USM Sétif	–	(–)

International career
1958–1962	Algeria FLN	30	(–)
1962–1963	Algeria	2	(0)

Managerial career
- 1967–1969: ASM Oran
- 1969–1970: USM Sétif
- 1970–19??: NAR Oran
- 19??–19??: ASM Oran
- * Club domestic league appearances and goals

Kaddour Bekhloufi (7 June 1934 – 26 July 2019) was a professional footballer who played as a forward and also as a defender. He played international football for FLN football team and Algeria.

== Biography ==
Since he was young, Kaddour Bekhloufi is already interested in football, with the large number of clubs created in Oran, Kaddour had the choice, so he left to sign at the Club Athlétique Liberté d'Oran (CAL Oran), before joining the AS Marine d'Oran.

A few years later, in 1956, he received his first proposals contract from abroad, from Valencia and AS Monaco. He therefore goes to test AS Monaco that will prove conclusive. He will then make two tours with his club, in Corsica and Germany where he confirms his value. For his first match, he will replace Michel Hidalgo, and he will score a goal, which will be applauded by Prince Rainier and his wife Grace Kelly, who will insist on seeing him after the match.

In 1958, Kaddour left to join the FLN football team in Tunis, with whom he will stay for 4 years and play 30 games. After this period, he played with USM Bel Abbès, then returned to Oran at ASM Oran and will finish his career as a player at USM Sétif, he will train after training his ASM Oran heart club.
