= Dahmane Defnoun =

Algerian footballer (born 1936)

Personal information
- Full name: Dahmane Defnoun
- Date of birth: May 8, 1936 (age 90)
- Place of birth: Bologhine, Algeria
- Height: 1.71 m (5 ft 7 1/2 in)
- Position: Defender

Senior career*
Years	Team	Apps	(Gls)
1956–1959	Olympique Alès	53	(2)
1959–1960	Angers SCO	33	(2)
1962–1964	Angers SCO	60	(0)

International career
1960–1962	FLN	30	(?)
1963–1965	Algeria	10	(0)
- * Club domestic league appearances and goals

Dahmane Defnoun (born 8 May 1936) is a former Algerian football player. He is widely known for being a member of the FLN football team. After Algeria gained its independence in 1962, he went on to make 10 appearances for the Algeria national team.
