= Jacky Belabde =

Algerian footballer (born 1960)

Personal information
- Full name: Jacky Belabde
- Date of birth: July 11, 1960 (age 66)
- Place of birth: Champdeniers-Saint-Denis, France
- Height: 1.84 m (6 ft 1/2 in)
- Position: Striker

Senior career*
| Years | Team | Apps | (Gls) |
| 1984–1988 | Chamois Niortais | 89 | (37) |
| 1988–1990 | ES Rochelaise | 48 | (15) |
- * Club domestic league appearances and goals

Jacky Belabde (born July 11, 1960) is a retired Algerian professional footballer.

He played one match for the Algeria national football team, a friendly against Congolese football club Inter Club Brazzaville in Annaba, scoring two goals.
