= Darío Cabrol =

Argentine footballer

Personal information
- Full name: Darío Gabriel Cabrol
- Date of birth: January 31, 1972 (age 54)
- Place of birth: Santa Fe, Argentina
- Height: 1.76 m (5 ft 9 in)
- Position: Midfielder

Senior career*
| Years | Team | Apps | (Gls) |
| 1990–2000 | Unión | 273 | (54) |
| 1992–1993 | → Racing Club (loan) | 32 | (4) |
| 1993–1994 | → Lanús (loan) | 18 | (2) |
| 2000 | Toulouse FC | 9 | (0) |
| 2001 | Colón | 17 | (3) |
| 2001 | Tucumán | 17 | (10) |
| 2002 | Universidad de Chile | 34 | (6) |
| 2003 | Huracán | 6 | (2) |
| 2003 | SC Emelec | 16 | (2) |
| 2004 | Blooming | 2 | (0) |
| 2004–2005 | Ben Hur | 23 | (2) |
| 2006 | Argentino (R) | 9 | (0) |
| 2006–2007 | Gimnasia de Santa Fe | 7 | (1) |
- * Club domestic league appearances and goals as of July 8, 2008

Darío Gabriel Cabrol (born January 31, 1972, in Santa Fe) is a former Argentine football midfielder who played professionally in Argentina, France, Chile, Bolivia and Ecuador during the 1990s through 2007.

== Club career ==
Cabrol began his career in 1990 with his hometown club Unión de Santa Fe. In 1992, he was loaned to Racing Club, before joining Lanús a year later. In 1994, Cabrol went back to Unión to find the club competing in the Primera B Nacional. With his help, the team won the promotion in 1996 and returned to first division after two years. He played there for four more seasons. During his two periods at Unión, Cabrol earned a total of 197 league appearances and 40 goals scored in the Primera División Argentina.

In 2000, he awoke the interest of French team Toulouse FC, which ultimately acquired his rights. However, during his time in Ligue 1 he made most of his appearances coming off the bench. After a disappointing stint in Europe, he returned to Argentina and signed with Unión's biggest rival, Colón. Six months later, he transferred to Atlético Tucumán where he had a successful season. His tuned-up performance rewarded him with a transfer to Universidad de Chile. In 2003 Cabrol made his last run in the Argentine first division with Huracán before moving to Ecuador to join Emelec.

In 2004, he had a spell with Bolivian team Blooming, but left the club only after a couple of months as he didn't live up to the expectations. Back in his country, he joined Ben Hur and played there until late 2005. In the sunset of his career, Cabrol decided to try his luck at Argentino de Rosario, hoping to have a successful season and consequently get a call from senior clubs Newell's or Central. However, he never got that offer and finished his career playing in the Torneo Argentino B with Gimnasia y Esgrima de Santa Fe.

== Club titles ==
| Season | Club | Title |
|---|---|---|
| 1996 | Unión de Santa Fe | Primera B Nacional |
