= Lamri Laachi =

Algerian footballer (born 1951)

Personal information
- Full name: Lamri Laaachi
- Date of birth: 1 October 1951 (age 75)
- Place of birth: Sétif, Algeria
- Height: 1.80 m (5 ft 11 in)
- Position: Defender

Youth career
- Paris FC

Senior career*
| Years | Team | Apps | (Gls) |
| 1973–1982 | Paris FC | 255 | (29) |
| 1982–1985 | RCF Paris | 45 | (8) |
| 1987–1988 | Paris FC | - | (-) |
- * Club domestic league appearances and goals

Lamri Laachi (born 1 October 1951) is a former Algerian footballer. He played as a defender. He spent the majority of his career with Paris FC except for a stint with RCF Paris.
