= Ernesto Gianella =

Argentine-French footballer (1941–2025)

Personal information
- Date of birth: 31 January 1941
- Place of birth: Buenos Aires, Argentina
- Date of death: 3 January 2025 (aged 83)
- Place of death: Euzet, France
- Height: 1.74 m (5 ft 9 in)
- Position: Forward

Senior career*
Years	Team	Apps	(Gls)
1961–1962	Nice	6	(0)
1962–1963	AS Béziers	31	(25)
1963	Nice	10	(5)
1963–1964	Reims	21	(8)
1964–1965	Monaco	7	(1)
1965–1967	AS Béziers	67	(42)
1967–1969	Nîmes	57	(24)
1969–1971	Pays d'Aix	46	(18)
1971–1973	Châteauroux	30	(6)
1973	US Tarascon		
1974–1975	Olympique Alès	3	(2)
- * Club domestic league appearances and goals

Ernesto Gianella (31 January 1941 – 3 January 2025) was an Argentine footballer who played as a forward. He died on 3 January 2025, at the age of 83.
