= Mustapha Zitouni =

Algerian footballer (1928-2014)

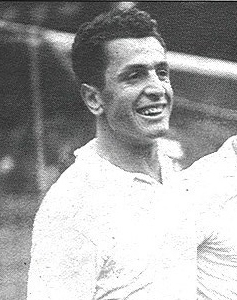

Personal information
- Date of birth: 19 October 1928
- Place of birth: Algiers, French Algeria
- Date of death: 5 January 2014 (aged 85)
- Place of death: Nice, France
- Height: 1.75 m (5 ft 9 in)
- Position: Defender

Senior career*
Years	Team	Apps	(Gls)
1950–1953	OM Saint-Eugène		
1953–1954	Cannes	38	(4)
1954–1958	Monaco	136	(2)
1962–1963	Chartres		
1964–1967	RC Kouba		
Total		174	(6)

International career
1957–1958	France	4	(0)
1958–1962	Algeria FLN		
1963–1965	Algeria	12	(1)
- * Club domestic league appearances and goals

Mustapha Zitouni (Arabic: مصطفى زيتوني; 19 October 1928 – 5 January 2014) was a professional footballer who played as a defender. He played international football for both France and Algeria.

== Career ==
Born in Algiers, French Algeria, Zitouni began his career with OM Saint-Eugène. He then played in France for Cannes, Monaco and Chartres. While in France he represented the French national side. He was also part of France's squad at the 1952 Summer Olympics, but he did not play in any matches. He left his professional career in France in 1958 to represent the unofficial Algerian national side, which was then run by the National Liberation Front, a rebel group campaigning for Algerian independence. While in Algeria he played football for RC Kouba.

== Later life ==
Zitouni returned to France, settling in Côte d'Azur and working for Air Algérie in Nice.

He died on 5 January 2014, at the age of 85.
