= Francisco Gerometta =

Argentine footballer

Personal information
- Full name: Francisco Joel Gerometta
- Date of birth: 1 September 1999 (age 27)
- Place of birth: San Isidro, Argentina
- Height: 1.75 m (5 ft 9 in)
- Position: Right-back

Team information
- Current team: Godoy Cruz

Youth career
- 2013–2020: Unión Santa Fe

Senior career*
Years	Team	Apps	(Gls)
2020–2026	Unión Santa Fe	67	(0)
2021–2022	→ Gimnasia LP (loan)	33	(0)
2026–	Godoy Cruz	0	(0)
- * Club domestic league appearances and goals as of 19:01, 17 March 2026 (UTC)

Francisco Joel Gerometta (born 1 September 1999) is an Argentine professional footballer who plays as a right-back for Godoy Cruz.

== Professional career ==
Gerometta joined the youth academy of Unión Santa Fe in 2013. Gerometta made his professional debut with Unión Santa Fe in a 2-1 Argentine Primera División loss to River Plate on 10 February 2020.

On 13 July 2021, Gerometta moved to fellow league club Gimnasia La Plata on loan until the end of 2022, with a purchase option.
