= Abdelkrim Kerroum =

Algerian footballer (1936–2022)

Personal information
- Date of birth: 25 March 1936
- Place of birth: Saïda, French Algeria, France
- Date of death: 9 January 2022 (aged 85)
- Height: 1.68 m (5 ft 6 in)
- Position: Attacking midfielder

Senior career*
Years	Team	Apps	(Gls)
1954–1959	MC Saïda		
1959–1960	FC Sète		
1960–1961	AS Troyes-Savinienne		
1962–1963	AS Troyes-Savinienne		
1963–1967	MC Saïda		

International career
1961–1962	FLN		
1963–1964	Algeria	3	(0)
- * Club domestic league appearances and goals

Abdelkrim Kerroum (25 March 1936 – 9 January 2022) was an Algerian footballer who played as an attacking midfielder. He was a member of the FLN football team. Kerroum died on 9 January 2022, at the age of 85.
