= Leonardo Madelón =

Argentine footballer and manager

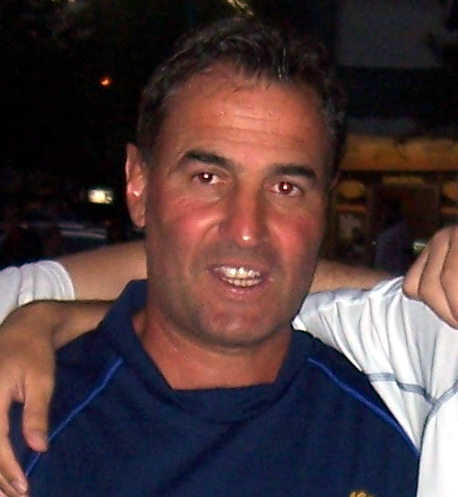
- Madelón in 2009

Personal information
- Full name: Leonardo Carol Madelón
- Date of birth: 25 January 1963 (age 63)
- Place of birth: Cafferata, Argentina
- Position: Midfielder

Team information
- Current team: Unión Santa Fe (manager)

Youth career
- San Lorenzo

Senior career*
Years	Team	Apps	(Gls)
1982–1988	San Lorenzo	113	(8)
1988–1990	Unión Santa Fe	33	(1)
1990–1993	Rosario Central	62	(8)

Managerial career
- 1997–1998: Colegiales
- 1998–2000: El Porvenir
- 2001: Unión Santa Fe
- 2004: Nueva Chicago
- 2004–2005: Talleres de Córdoba
- 2006–2007: Olimpo
- 2007–2008: Rosario Central
- 2008–2009: Gimnasia La Plata
- 2010: Rosario Central
- 2010–2011: Quilmes
- 2011–2012: San Lorenzo
- 2013–2016: Unión Santa Fe
- 2016–2017: Belgrano
- 2017–2020: Unión Santa Fe
- 2021: Platense
- 2022: Arsenal de Sarandí
- 2023: Central Córdoba
- 2023–2024: Gimnasia La Plata
- 2025–: Unión Santa Fe
- * Club domestic league appearances and goals

Leonardo Carol Madelón (born 25 January 1963) is an Argentine football manager and former player who played as a midfielder. He is the current manager of Unión de Santa Fe.

== Career ==
Madelón played club football for San Lorenzo, Unión de Santa Fe and Rosario Central between 1982 and 1993.

== Coaching career ==
In 1997, he started his managerial career with Colegiales in the lower leagues of Argentine football. He then had a spell with El Porvenir before returning to his former club Unión de Santa Fe in 2001.

He then had an unsuccessful spell in charge of Nueva Chicago in 2004. He returned to management in 2006, and lead Olimpo to both Apertura and Clausura championships in the Primera B Nacional (second division) 2006–07 season, gaining automatic promotion to the Primera División.

In 2007, he returned to his former club Rosario Central, and in 2008 he took over as manager of Gimnasia y Esgrima La Plata. On 2 December 2009, the coach has quit Gimnasia and was replaced by Pablo Fernández. In 2010, Madelón coached Rosario Central again, but could not help the team avoid relegation.

For the 2010 Apertura, Madelón replaced Hugo Tocalli as Quilmes manager.

== Managerial titles ==
Season	Team	Title
Apertura 2006	Olimpo	Primera B Nacional
Clausura 2007	Olimpo	Primera B Nacional
