= Amar Rouaï =

Algerian footballer and manager (1932–2017)

Personal information
- Full name: Amar Rouaï
- Date of birth: March 9, 1932
- Place of birth: Sétif, Algeria
- Date of death: November 11, 2017 (aged 85)
- Place of death: Annemasse, France
- Height: 1.70 m (5 ft 7 in)
- Position: Midfielder

Senior career*
| Years | Team | Apps | (Gls) |
| 1947–1952 | MC El Eulma | | |
| 1952–1954 | US Annemasse | | |
| 1954–1957 | Besançon | | |
| 1957–1958 | Angers | 27 | (7) |
| 1962–1963 | Angers | 15 | (1) |
| 1963 | USM Bel-Abbès | | |

International career
| 1958–1962 | FLN | 76 | |
| 1963 | Algeria | 1 | (0) |

Managerial career
- 1963: USM Bel-Abbès
- 1963–1964: MC El Eulma
- 1964–1968: Alakhdhar
- 1968–1970: ASM Oran
- 1974–1975: JS Kawkabi
- 1975–1980: Algeria Ol.
- 1980–1985: ESM Bel-Abbès
- 1985–1987: RCM Relizane
- 1987–1989: Mouloudia d'Oran
- 1994–1995: GC Mascara
- * Club domestic league appearances and goals

Amar Rouaï (March 9, 1932 – November 11, 2017) was a former Algerian international football player and manager. From 1958 to 1962, he was a member of the FLN football team.

== Club career ==
Rouaï began his career with MC El Eulma, making his debut with the senior team while aged 15. After five years with MC El Eulma, he moved to France to embark on a professional career. After two seasons with US Annemasse, he signed his first professional contract with Besançon. In 1957, he joined Ligue 1 side Angers, making 27 appearances and scoring 7 goals. However, at the end of the season, he secretly left the team to join the FLN football team. In 1962, after Algeria gained its independence, Rouaï returned to Angers. He made 15 more appearances for the club, scoring 1 goal, before buying out his contract.

== International career ==
In 1958, Rouaï secretly left Angers to go to Tunisia and join the FLN football team in support of the Algerian independence movement. He spent the next four years traveling and playing with the team. After Algeria gained its independence, he was called up twice to the Algeria national football team. The first, in 1962, was a friendly against French club Nîmes. In the second, on July 4, 1963, he made his official debut in a friendly against Egypt.

== Death ==
Rouai died in Annemasse at the French-Swiss border on November 11, 2017, at the age of 85.
