= Rubén Bravo =

Argentine footballer (1923–1977)

Rubén Norberto Bravo
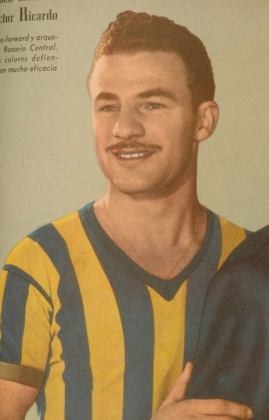

Personal information
- Date of birth: 16 November 1923
- Place of birth: Argentina
- Date of death: 24 August 1977 (aged 53)
- Place of death: Argentina
- Height: 1.74 m (5 ft 9 in)
- Position: Forward

Senior career*
Years	Team	Apps	(Gls)
1940–1946	Rosario Central	104	(65)
1945–1952	Racing Club	144	(79)
1952	Botafogo		
1953–1954	Palestino		
1954–1957	Nice	68	(18)
1957–1958	Grenoble	57	(12)
1959	AS Aix	17	(2)
1959–1960	FC Rouen	16	(5)
1960–1962	Roubaix-Tourcoing	38	(3)

International career
1950–1951	Argentina	3	(1)

Managerial career
- 1972–1974: Monaco
- 1976–1977: Talleres de Córdoba
- * Club domestic league appearances and goals

Rubén Noberto Bravo (16 November 1923 – 24 August 1977) was an Argentine football player and manager who played as a forward for clubs in Argentina, Chile and France. He made three appearances for the Argentina national team in 1950 and 1951 scoring once.

== Career ==
Bravo played for Nice from 1954 to 1957.

After he retired from playing, Bravo became a football coach.

== Death ==
Bravo died while managing Talleres de Córdoba in 1977 at the age of 53.

== Honours ==
Nice

- French Division 1: 1956
- Trophée des Champions: runner-up 1956
