= Claudio Corvalán =

Argentine footballer

Personal information
- Full name: Gaston Claudio Corvalán
- Date of birth: 23 March 1989 (age 37)
- Place of birth: Quilmes, Argentina
- Height: 1.79 m (5 ft 10 in)
- Position: Left-back

Team information
- Current team: Deportivo Madryn

Youth career
- Quilmes

Senior career*
Years	Team	Apps	(Gls)
2009–2012	Quilmes	85	(5)
2012–2016	Racing	51	(0)
2014–2015	→ Newell's Old Boys (loan)	11	(0)
2015–2016	→ Sarandí (loan)	20	(0)
2016–2018	Sarandí	51	(2)
2018–2026	Unión Santa Fe	194	(3)
2026–	Deportivo Madryn	13	(1)
- * Club domestic league appearances and goals as of 16:28, 6 October 2026 (UTC)

Gaston Claudio Corvalán (born 23 March 1989) is an Argentine professional footballer who plays as a left-back for Primera Nacional side Deportivo Madryn.

== Career ==
Corvalán's senior career started in 2009 with Primera B Nacional club Quilmes, he made his debut on 30 May in a win over Ferro Carril Oeste. He made a further three league appearances in 2008–09 and scored his first goal in his last game of the season against Olimpo. Corvalán made thirty-four appearances in 2009–10 as Quilmes won promotion into the 2010–11 Argentine Primera División. However, the club were relegated and returned to Primera B Nacional for 2011–12. 2011–12 turned out to be his last with Quilmes, but it did end in promotion as the team again finished second in Primera B Nacional.

As Quilmes made their way into the Argentine Primera División, Corvalán followed as he left to join Racing Club. He went onto make fifty-one appearances over two seasons for Racing Club before being loaned out to Newell's Old Boys and then to Arsenal de Sarandí, both Primera División clubs. He played eleven times for Newell's and twenty for Arsenal, at the end of his loan spell with Arsenal the club signed him permanently. In his first match since signing permanently, Corvalán was sent off in a defeat to Sarmiento. He made his 200th league appearance on 16 October versus San Martín.

In June 2018, following Arsenal's relegation to Primera B Nacional, Corvalán departed to sign for Unión Santa Fe.

== Career statistics ==
As of 26 June 2018.

Club statistics
Club	Season	League			Cup (Note: Includes the Copa Argentina)		League Cup		Continental (Note: Includes the Copa Libertadores and Copa Sudamericana)		Other		Total	
Club	Season	Division	Apps	Goals	Apps	Goals	Apps	Goals	Apps	Goals	Apps	Goals	Apps	Goals
Quilmes	2008–09	Primera B Nacional	4	1	0	0	—		—		0	0	4	1
Quilmes	2009–10	Primera B Nacional	34	1	0	0	—		—		0	0	34	1
Quilmes	2010–11	Primera División	14	0	0	0	—		—		0	0	14	0
Quilmes	2011–12	Primera B Nacional	33	3	0	0	—		—		0	0	33	3
Quilmes	Total		85	5	0	0	—		—		0	0	85	5
Racing Club	2012–13	Primera División	30	0	2	0	—		2 (Note: Two appearances in 2012 Copa Sudamericana)	0	0	0	34	0
Racing Club	2013–14	Primera División	21	0	0	0	—		2 (Note: Two appearances in 2013 Copa Sudamericana)	0	0	0	23	0
Racing Club	2014	Primera División	0	0	0	0	—		—		0	0	0	0
Racing Club	2015	Primera División	0	0	0	0	—		0	0	0	0	0	0
Racing Club	2016	Primera División	0	0	0	0	—		0	0	0	0	0	0
Racing Club	Total		51	0	2	0	—		4	0	0	0	57	0
Newell's Old Boys (loan)	2014	Primera División	10	0	0	0	—		0	0	0	0	10	0
Newell's Old Boys (loan)	2015	Primera División	1	0	0	0	—		—		0	0	1	0
Newell's Old Boys (loan)	Total		11	0	0	0	—		0	0	0	0	11	0
Arsenal de Sarandí (loan)	2015	Primera División	4	0	0	0	—		1 (Note: One appearance in 2015 Copa Sudamericana)	0	0	0	5	0
Arsenal de Sarandí (loan)	2016	Primera División	16	0	1	0	—		—		0	0	17	0
Arsenal de Sarandí	2016–17	Primera División	27	1	2	1	—		2 (Note: Two appearances in 2017 Copa Sudamericana)	1 (Note: One goal in 2017 Copa Sudamericana)	0	0	31	3
Arsenal de Sarandí	2017–18	Primera División	24	1	1	0	—		2	0	0	0	26	1
Arsenal de Sarandí	Total		71	2	4	1	—		5	1	0	0	79	4
Unión Santa Fe	2018–19	Primera División	0	0	0	0	—		0	0	0	0	0	0
Career total			218	7	6	1	—		9	1	0	0	233	9
