= Abderrahmane Soukhane =

Algerian footballer (1936–2015)

Abderrahmane Soukane (13 September 1936 – 5 July 2015) was an Algerian footballer who played as a striker.

== Club career ==
Soukane was born in 1936 in El Biar, Algiers, Algeria. Nicknamed Soukane II, he started his playing career in the junior ranks of JS El Biar. At the age of 20, he joined French club Le Havre, playing with the club for 8 seasons. He helped the team reach the top flight of French football in 1959, winning the Division 2 Championship. However, after three seasons, Le Havre was relegated again to the second division. Soukane stayed with the club until 1964, when the professional section of the club was disbanded. In his final season with Le Havre, he would finish as the top scorer in Ligue 2 with 21 goals, the first African to do so.

In 1964, he joined Toulouse FC after discussions with long-time FLN teammate Kader Firoud who was announced as coach of the team. In his first season, Toulouse finished a modest 11th in the 18-team top division. In his second season, they finished 4th in the standings, earning a ticket to the UEFA Cup (known as the Inter-Cities Fairs Cup Finals then). He would also lead the team to the semi-finals of the Coupe de France, where they lost 2–1 to RC Strasbourg. Soukane scored Toulouse's only goal in that game, and was also used as goalkeeper after the expulsion of the Toulouse keeper Devis. Soukane played two more seasons with Toulouse FC, and at the end of the 1967 season left the club after the disbandment of the professional section. He played one season with Red Star 93 before retiring from football.

== International career ==
Soukane, along with his older brother Mohamed, were members of the Algerian FLN football team.

== Death ==
Soukane died at the age of 78 on 5 July 2015, in El Biar, Algiers.

== Honours ==
Individual

- Ligue 2 top scorer: 1964 (with 21 goals)
