= Mateo Del Blanco =

Argentine footballer (born 2003)

Personal information
- Date of birth: 31 October 2003 (age 23)
- Place of birth: Santa Fe, Argentina
- Height: 1.70 m (5 ft 7 in)
- Position: Left back

Team information
- Current team: Strasbourg
- Number: 15

Youth career
- –2014: Corinthians Santa Fe
- 2014–2023: Unión Santa Fe

Senior career*
Years	Team	Apps	(Gls)
2023–2026	Unión Santa Fe	96	(4)
2026–	Strasbourg	2	(0)
- * Club domestic league appearances and goals as of 19:11, 29 August 2026 (UTC)

Mateo Del Blanco (born 31 October 2003) is an Argentine professional footballer who plays as a left back for French Ligue 1 club Strasbourg.

== Career ==
He came through the academy at Union de Santa Fe after joining in 2014 from Corinthians Santa Fe. Progessimg to playing for their youth and academy teams, he trained with the first team in 2022 for the first time, signing his first professional contact later that year. He made his first team debut on 11 April 2023 against Argentinos Juniors, in a 5–1 defeat.

Initially a left-sided midfielder, he transitioned into playing as a full-back, whilst still maintaining offensive skills that led to him being credited with a number of assists during the 2025 season, and his first league goal for the club against Gimnasia. Having established himself as a regular first team player; in September 2025, he signed a new three-year contract extension with the club.

On 8 July 2026, Del Blanco signed a five-year contract with Strasbourg in France.

== Career statistics ==
As of match played 29 August 2026

Appearances and goals by club, season and competition
Club	Season	League			National cup (Note: Includes Copa Argentina)		Continental		Other		Total	
Club	Season	Division	Apps	Goals	Apps	Goals	Apps	Goals	Apps	Goals	Apps	Goals
Unión Santa Fe	2023	AFA Liga Profesional de Fútbol	18	0	1	0	—		—		0	0
Unión Santa Fe	2024	AFA Liga Profesional de Fútbol	28	1	0	0	—		—		28	1
Unión Santa Fe	2025	AFA Liga Profesional de Fútbol	32	1	3	0	6 (Note: Appearances in Copa Sudamericana)	0	—		41	1
Unión Santa Fe	2026	AFA Liga Profesional de Fútbol	18	2	2	0	0	0	—		20	2
Unión Santa Fe	Total		96	4	6	0	6	0	—		108	4
Strasbourg	2026–27	Ligue 1	2	0	0	0	—		—		2	0
Career total			98	4	6	0	6	0	0	0	110	4
