= Unión de Santa Fe =

Argentine sports club

Unión
- Full name: Club Atlético Unión
- Nicknames: Tatengue; El Tate
- Founded: 15 April 1907; 119 years ago
- Ground: Estadio 15 de Abril
- Capacity: 29,000
- President: Luis Spahn
- Manager: Leonardo Madelón
- League: Primera División
- 2025: 17th of 30
- Website: clubaunion.com.ar
Home colours	Away colours	Third colours

Club Atlético Unión (Spanish pronunciation: [ˈkluβ aˈtletiko wˈnjon]; mostly known as Unión de Santa Fe [uˈnjon de santa ˈfe]) is a sports club from Santa Fe, the capital city of the Santa Fe Province, in Argentina. The club was founded on 15 April 1907. Unión is mostly known for its football team and currently plays in the Argentine Primera División.

Other sports practised at the club include basketball, futsal, gymnastics, field hockey, swimming, karate, rugby union, roller skating, and volleyball. The basketball team competes in Liga Nacional de Básquet, the top division of basketball in Argentina.

== History ==
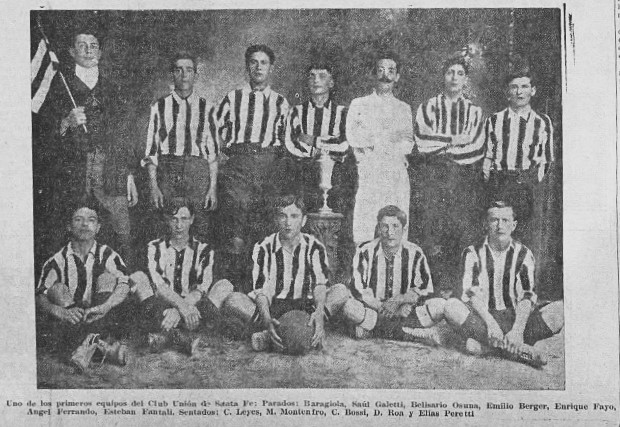
Team of Unión in 1907

The club was established by a group of fourteen former members of Santa Fe Foot-ball Club, on April 13, 1907 after a meeting held in the Baragiola family on Catamarca street. Guillermo Drenner was appointed as president of the institution. Initially the club was named "Club United" after a proposal from founding member Cayetano Bossi, who alleged that the club should represent the friendship ties of the founders. The name changed to "Unión Foot-Ball Club" in 1907, remaining until 1918 when it was translated to "Club Atlético Unión" in Spanish language.

The first shirt worn was white with black collar. In 1907 a meeting was held with the purpose of choosing the club colors. Some of the models proposed were a red, white and black striped, while other members proposed a white and red striped shirt (inspired on legendary Alumni Athletic Club uniform), which finally won after being voted by the majority.

The first match played by the team was vs a San Carlos Centro on 15 May 1907, won by Unión 4–1. Unión was also a founding member (along with Argentine, Central Santa Fe, Brown, Red Star, Sarmiento, San Justo Football Club y Estudiantes de Comercio) the "Liga Regional Santafesina", where the team won the title four consecutive times. In 1910 the club moved their field to a land on Boulevard Pellegrini and San Jerónimo. In 1911 Unión requested affiliation to "Liga Rosarina de Football" which would allow them to play with stronger teams and more competitive tournaments so teams of Liga Rosarina participated in national cups with teams from Buenos Aires. The LRF accepted the request in 1912, and Unión debuted there vs. Argentino (3–3 tie). The first win in Liga Rosarina was vs Aprendices Rosarinos with the following line-up: José Luis Peíteado; Saúl Galetti, Domingo Pallavidini; José Ayala, Alfredo González, Domingo Gómez; Gregorio Aguirre, Arturo Pérez, Manuel Montenegro, Elías Pieretti, Domiciano Roa.

On 26 November 1966, Unión was promoted to the Primera División for the first time, after defeating Talleres (RE) 3–0 and winning the 1966 Segunda División title.

Unión's supporters are called "unionistas", "tatengues", while the squad is usually nicknamed "El Tate". The colours of the club consist of red and white vertical stripes.

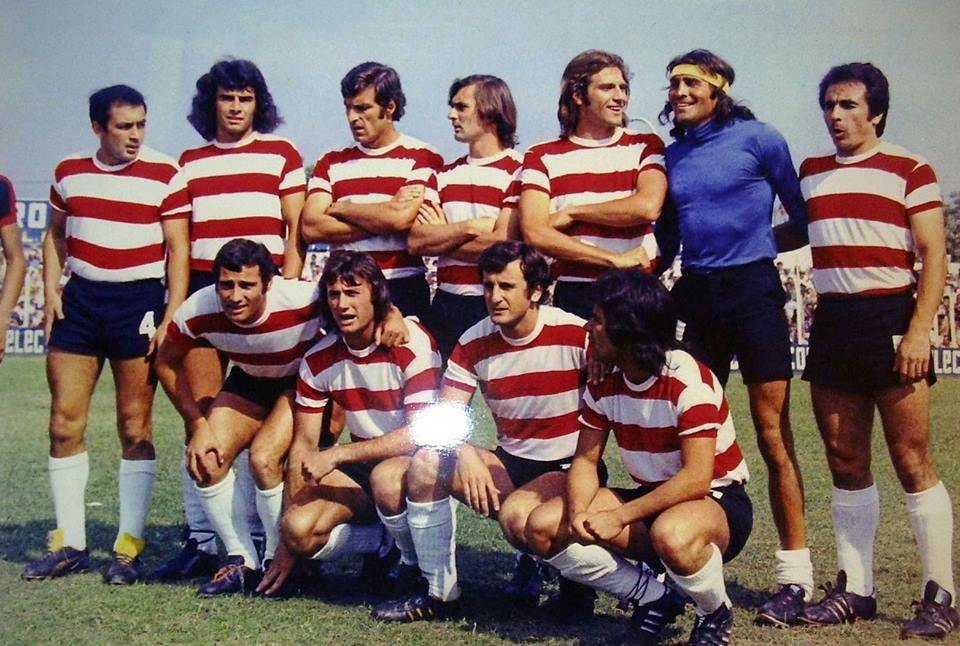
Team of 1975 that made a great campaign in Primera División, finishing 4th

Managed by Juan Carlos Lorenzo in 1975, Unión made a great campaign in the 1975 championship with a group of notable players such as goalkeeper Hugo Gatti, midfielders Victorio Cocco and Rubén Suñé and forwards Ernesto Mastrángelo and Leopoldo Luque among others.

In 1979 Unión played the final matches of the Nacional championship, but lost at the hands of River Plate, because the goal scored by River in the first match (with a final score of 1–1) ended up in an average over Union according to the away goals rule applied to that tournament.

Amongst the most famous footballers who played for Unión are Leopoldo Luque, World Cup winner with Argentina in 1978, and Nery Pumpido, the goalkeeper of the national team that won the World Cup in Mexico 1986.

== Rivalry ==
Unión and Colón are the two largest football clubs in Santa Fe. The Clásico Santafesino has been played since 1913 and is known as one of football's fiercest and most important rivalries in Argentina. Unión and Colón have played 147 games all time against each other in the Amateur and Professional Era, with Unión winning 48, Colón winning 43, 51 draws and 5 no contest (there are no records for those matches, which took place between 1913 and 1917).

== Players ==
=== Current squad ===
As of 2 July 2026

Note: Flags indicate national team as defined under FIFA eligibility rules; some limited exceptions apply. Players may hold more than one non-FIFA nationality.

No.	Pos.	Nation	Player
2	DF	URU	Maizon Rodríguez
3	DF	ARG	Claudio Corvalán (captain)
4	DF	URU	Emiliano Álvarez
5	MF	ARG	Lucas Menossi
7	FW	ARG	Franco Fragapane
8	MF	ARG	Nicolás Palavecino (on loan from Defensa y Justicia)
9	FW	ARG	Agustín Colazo
10	FW	ARG	Tomás González
11	DF	ARG	Mateo Del Blanco
12	DF	ARG	Bruno Pittón
13	DF	ARG	Valentín Fascendini
19	FW	ARG	Marcelo Estigarribia
20	MF	ARG	Julián Palacios
21	GK	ARG	Matías Mansilla ( on loan from Estudiantes)

No.	Pos.	Nation	Player
22	MF	ARG	Brahian Cuello
23	MF	ARG	Augusto Solari
25	FW	ARG	Cristian Tarragona
26	DF	ARG	Juan Pablo Ludueña
27	MF	ARG	Enzo Roldán
28	GK	ARG	Federico Gomes Gerth
29	FW	ARG	Diego Díaz
30	MF	ARG	Mauro Pittón
31	FW	ARG	Misael Aguirre
32	DF	ARG	Nicolás Paz
35	DF	ARG	Lautaro Vargas
40	GK	ARG	Lucas Meuli
43	MF	ARG	Emilio Giaccone
46	MF	ARG	Santiago Grella

=== Reserve squad ===
Note: Flags indicate national team as defined under FIFA eligibility rules; some limited exceptions apply. Players may hold more than one non-FIFA nationality.

No.	Pos.	Nation	Player
44	DF	ARG	Tomas Fagioli

=== Out on loan ===
Note: Flags indicate national team as defined under FIFA eligibility rules; some limited exceptions apply. Players may hold more than one non-FIFA nationality.

No.	Pos.	Nation	Player
8	FW	ARG	José Vanetta (at Progreso until 30 June 2026)
9	FW	PAR	Junior Marabel (at Sarmiento (Junín) until 31 December 2026)
10	MF	ARG	Lionel Verde (at Baniyas until 30 June 2026)
14	DF	PAR	Fernando Díaz (at Nacional until 31 December 2026)
23	DF	ARG	Gastón Arturia (at Sarmiento (Junín) until 31 December 2026)

No.	Pos.	Nation	Player
24	DF	ARG	Franco Godoy (at Deportivo Madryn until 31 December 2026)
25	GK	URU	Thiago Cardozo (at Belgrano until 31 December 2026)
29	FW	ARG	Daniel Juárez (at San Miguel until 31 December 2026)
45	FW	ARG	Pablo Palacio (at Almagro until 31 December 2026)

=== Records ===
==== Most goals ====
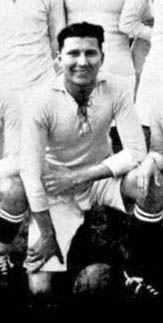
Francisco Valiente, Union's all-time top goalscorer

No.	Player	Goals
1	Francisco Valiente	129
2	Fernando Alí	85
3	Orlando Ruiz	81
4	Carlos Verga	73
5	Mario Gervé	72
6	Rodolfo Milessi	64
7	José Luis Marzo	63
8	Julio Mir	62
9	Carlos Castillo	60
10	Julio Enrique Ávila	59

Top 10 all-time goalscores at clubaunion.com.ar

==== Most appearances ====
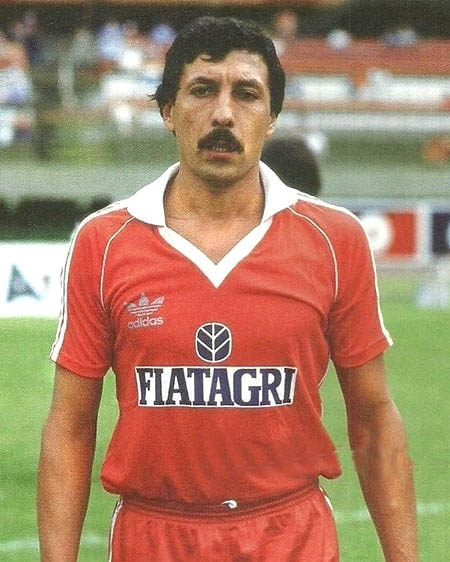
Pablo de las Mercedes Cárdenas, most appearances with 364 matches

No	Player	App.
1	Pablo de las Mercedes Cárdenas	364
2	Fernando Alí	348
3	Mario Eduardo Alberto	327
4	Hugo Ismael López	326
5	Víctor Bottaníz	313
6	Darío Cabrol	272
7	Eduardo Roberto Sánchez	266
8	Ariel José Donnet	255
9	Nereo Fernández	240
10	Carlos Santos Mazzoni	235

Top 10 all-time most appearances at clubaunion.com.ar

=== Notable players ===
To appear in this section a player must have played at least 50 games for the club and/or played officially for their national team.

- (Argentina) Alberto Galateo (1927–34)
- (Argentina) Julio Ávila (1948–49), (1955–56)
- (Argentina) José Vicente Grecco (1949–53)
- (Argentina) Victorio Cocco (1964–67)
- (Argentina) Néstor Scotta (1967–69)
- (Argentina) Mario Zanabria (1967–69)
- (Spain) Roberto Martínez (1970)
- (Argentina) Leopoldo Luque (1971), (1973–75), (1980–81)
- (Argentina) Hugo Gatti (1974–75)
- (Argentina) Carlos Trullet (1974–77)
- (Argentina) Rubén Suñé (1975)
- (Argentina) Víctor Marchetti (1975–76), (1984)
- (Argentina) Roberto Telch (1976–79)
- (Argentina) Nery Pumpido (1976–81), (1991)
- (Bolivia) Carlos Trucco (1977–81), (1984–85)
- (Argentina) Fernando Alí (1978–88)
- (Argentina) Ramón Centurión (1978–85), (1991–92)
- (Argentina) Osvaldo Escudero (1982–85)
- (Chile) (Argentina) Daniel Morón (1983–88)
- (Argentina) Daniel Killer (1984–86)
- (Argentina) Alberto Acosta (1986–88)
- (Argentina) Ricardo Altamirano (1986–88)
- (Argentina) Edgardo Arasa (1986–88)
- (Colombia) Antony de Ávila (1987–88)
- (Argentina) Claudio Borghi (1990–91)
- (Argentina) Darío Cabrol (1990–92), (1994–00)
- (Argentina) Ricardo Giusti (1991–92)
- (Argentina) José Luis Marzo (1991–95), (1996–98)
- (Ghana) Nii Lamptey (1997)
- (Paraguay) Danilo Aceval (1997–99)
- (Argentina) Pablo Cavallero (1998–99)
- (Peru) Juan José Jayo (1998–00)
- (Venezuela) Daniel Noriega (1998–00), (2001–02)
- (Argentina) Matías Donnet (1999–00), (2009–10)
- (Argentina) Andrés Silvera (1999–01)
- (Argentina) Daniel Tílger (1999–01)
- (Argentina) Martín Zapata (1999–04), (2006–09)
- (Argentina) Marcelo Mosset (1999–06), (2007–08)
- (Argentina) Fernando Ortiz (2000–03)
- (Bolivia) Leonardo Fernández (2001)
- (Argentina) Rubén Capria (2001–03)
- (Argentina) Roberto Battión (2002–07)
- (Argentina) Ignacio Canuto (2004–07)

== Managers ==
- (Argentina) Juan Carlos Lorenzo (1975–1976)
- (Argentina) Reynaldo Volken (1977–1979)
- (Argentina) Humberto Zucarelli (1988–1990)
- (Argentina) Carlos Trullet (1990–1991), (1995–1998)
- (Argentina) Salvador Capitano (1999)
- (Argentina) Juan José López (1999)
- (Argentina) Nery Pumpido (1999–2001)
- (Argentina) Leonardo Madelón (2001)
- (Argentina) Carlos Griguol (2002)
- (Argentina) Frank Kudelka (2002)
- (Argentina) Néstor Craviotto (2005–2006)
- (Argentina) Carlos Trullet (2006–2007)
- (Argentina) Fernando Quiroz (2008–2009)
- (Argentina) Fernando Alí (2009–2010)
- (Argentina) Frank Kudelka (2010–2012)
- (Argentina) Nery Pumpido (2012)
- (Argentina) Facundo Sava (2012–2013)
- (Argentina) Leonardo Madelón (2013–2016)
- (Argentina) Juan Pablo Pumpido (2016–2017)
- (Argentina) Pablo Marini (2017)
- (Argentina) Leonardo Madelón (2017–2020)
- (Argentina) Marcelo Mosset (2020) (caretaker)
- (Argentina) Juan Manuel Azconzábal (2020–2021)
- (Uruguay) Gustavo Munúa (2021–2023)
- (Argentina) Sebastián Méndez (2023)
- (Argentina) Kily González (2023–2025)
- (Argentina) Leonardo Madelón (2025–present)

=== Current coaching staff ===
Position	Staff
Head coach	(Argentina) Leonardo Madelón
Assistant coach	(Argentina) Carlos Ruiz
Assistant coach	(Argentina) Nicolás Vazzoler
Goalkeeping coach	(Argentina) Rodrigo Llinás
Fitness coach	(Argentina) Augusto Madelón
Fitness coach	(Argentina) David Gutiérrez
Physiotherapist	(Argentina) Flavio Della Giustina
Physiotherapist	(Argentina) Omar Ferrero
Team doctor	(Argentina) Ángel Battaglia
Team doctor	(Argentina) Santiago Calvo
Team doctor	(Argentina) Eduardo Wagner
Nutritionist	(Argentina) Silvia Fredes
Psychologist	(Argentina) César Palmieri

== Honours ==
=== National ===
- Primera División B
  - Winners (1): 1966

=== Regional ===
- Campeonato de Primera División Santafesina
  - Winners (18): 1907, 1908, 1909, 1910 (LRSF) 1912, 1915, 1917, 1919, 1920 (LSF), 1925 (ASAF), 1926 (FSF), 1932, 1934, 1935, 1936, 1938, 1939, 1971 (LSF)
- Copa de Competencia "Gobernador Manuel J. Menchaca"
  - Winners (3): 1916, 1917, 1919
- Copa Estímulo
  - Winners (1): 1924
- Torneo Preparación
  - Winners (2): 1935, 1937
- Campeonato de Honor
  - Winners (2): 1938, 1939
- Campeonato Absoluto
  - Winners (1): 1938
- Torneo Clasificatorio
  - Winners (2): Clasificatorio 1971, Petit Torneo 1971
- Federación de Fútbol de la Provincia de Santa Fe
  - Winners (1): Selectivo 1971

== Other sports ==
The club hosts other sports such as archery, basketball, field hockey, gymnastics, martial arts, roller skating, swimming, volleyball, amongst others.

=== Basketball ===
Apart from football, basketball is the foremost sport practiced at the institution, Union's team plays in Liga Nacional de Básquet since 2021, when they won the 2021 Liga Argentina title and were promoted to the top league after 34 years.

Carlos Delfino is probably its most recognized former player, but Mario Elie a three time NBA champion (1994, 1995 y 1999), also played briefly for Unión in the Argentine League in 1987.
