= 2025 Club Atlético Independiente season =

Club Atlético Independiente
2025 season
- President: Néstor Grindetti
- Manager: Julio Vaccari
- Stadium: Estadio Libertadores de América
- Torneo Apertura: Semi-finals
- Torneo Clausura: 11th
- Copa Argentina: Round of 16
- Copa Sudamericana: Round of 16
- Average home league attendance: 45,414
Home colours	Away colours

The 2025 season was the 120th for Club Atlético Independiente and their 11th consecutive season in the Primera División. The club will also took part in the Copa Argentina and Copa Sudamericana.

== Squad ==
=== Current squad ===
As of 28 January 2025

Note: Flags indicate national team as defined under FIFA eligibility rules; some limited exceptions apply. Players may hold more than one non-FIFA nationality.

No.	Pos.	Nation	Player
1	GK	ARG	Joaquín Blázquez (on loan from Talleres)
3	DF	ARG	Adrián Spörle
4	DF	ARG	Federico Vera
5	MF	CHI	Felipe Loyola
6	DF	ARG	Nicolás Freire
7	FW	ARG	Santiago Montiel
8	MF	CHI	Pablo Galdames
9	FW	PAR	Gabriel Ávalos
10	MF	CHI	Luciano Cabral
11	MF	ARG	Federico Mancuello
13	GK	URU	Manuel Tasso
14	MF	ARG	Lautaro Millán
16	FW	ARG	Santiago Hidalgo
18	FW	ARG	Ignacio Maestro Puch (on loan from Atlético Tucumán)
19	FW	ITA	Lucas Román

No.	Pos.	Nation	Player
20	MF	URU	Rodrigo Fernández Cedrés (on loan from Santos)
21	MF	ARG	David Martínez
22	FW	ARG	Chaco Martínez
23	MF	ARG	Iván Marcone (captain)
24	FW	ARG	Santiago López
26	DF	ARG	Kevin Lomónaco
27	FW	ARG	Diego Tarzia
31	FW	ARG	Nicolás Vallejo
32	DF	ARG	Franco Paredes
33	GK	ARG	Rodrigo Rey (vice-captain)
34	FW	ARG	Matías Giménez
35	DF	ARG	Santiago Salle
36	DF	ARG	Sebastián Valdez
77	DF	COL	Alvaro Angulo

=== Transfers In ===
Pos.	Player	Transferred from	Fee	Date	Source
DF	(Argentina) Nicolás Freire	(Mexico) Pumas UNAM	Loan	1 January 2025	
MF	(Chile) Luciano Cabral	(Mexico) León	€961,000	1 January 2025	
MF	(Chile) Pablo Galdames	(Brazil) Vasco da Gama	Free	3 January 2025	
DF	(Argentina) Sebastián Valdez	(Argentina) Central Córdoba	Free	4 January 2025	
DF	(Colombia) Álvaro Angulo	(Colombia) Atlético Nacional	Free	15 January 2025	
MF	(Uruguay) Rodrigo Fernández	(Brazil) Santos	Loan	20 January 2025	
DF	(Argentina) Leonardo Godoy	(Brazil) Athletico Paranaense	US$1,900,000	17 June 2025	
MF	(Argentina) Ignacio Pussetto	(Mexico) Pumas UNAM	Undisclosed	12 July 2025	
DF	(Argentina) Milton Valenzuela	(Switzerland) Lugano	Free	16 July 2025	
DF	(Argentina) Facundo Zabala	(Paraguay) Olimpia	€1,920,000	24 July 2025	
FW	(Uruguay) Matías Abaldo	(Uruguay) Defensor Sporting	Loan	6 August 2025	

=== Transfers Out ===
Pos.	Player	Transferred to	Fee	Date	Source
MF	(Argentina) Lucas González	(Argentina) Defensa y Justicia	€1,100,000	8 January 2025	
MF	(Ecuador) Jhonny Quiñónez	(Ecuador) Barcelona SC	Loan	16 January 2025	
FW	(Argentina) Braian Martínez	(Argentina) Tigre	Loan	20 June 2025	
DF	(Colombia) Álvaro Angulo	(Mexico) Pumas UNAM	€1,300,000	15 July 2025	

== Exhibition matches ==
18 January 2025	Defensor Sporting (Uruguay)	2–5	(Argentina) Independiente

21 March 2025	Independiente (Argentina)	3–1	(Argentina) Colegiales

== Competitions ==
=== Overall record ===
Competition	First match	Last match	Starting round	Final position	Record							
Competition	First match	Last match	Starting round	Final position	Pld	W	D	L	GF	GA	GD	Win %
Torneo Apertura	24 January 2025	24 May 2025	Matchday 1	Semi-finals	19	10	6	3	25	12	+13	52.63
Torneo Clausura	13 July 2025	15 November 2025	Matchday 1	11th	16	4	6	6	14	13	+1	25.00
Copa Argentina	26 February 2025	1 August 2025	Round of 64	Round of 16	3	2	0	1	4	3	+1	66.67
Copa Sudamericana	2 April 2025	20 August 2025	Group stage	Round of 16	8	4	1	3	11	8	+3	50.00
Total					46	20	13	13	54	36	+18	43.48

Source: Competitions

=== Primera División ===
==== Torneo Apertura ====
===== League table =====
Pos	Team	Pld	W	D	L	GF	GA	GD	Pts	Qualification
1	Rosario Central	16	10	5	1	22	8	+14	35	Advance to round of 16
2	River Plate	16	8	7	1	21	9	+12	31	Advance to round of 16
3	Independiente	16	8	5	3	23	12	+11	29	Advance to round of 16
4	San Lorenzo	16	7	6	3	14	10	+4	27	Advance to round of 16
5	Deportivo Riestra	16	5	9	2	13	7	+6	24	Advance to round of 16

Source: AFA

===== Results by round =====
Round	1
Ground	H
Result	
Position	

A = Away; H = Home; W = Win; D = Draw; L = Loss

===== Matches =====
24 January 2025 1	Independiente	2–1	Sarmiento	Avellaneda
19:15 UTC−3	Ávalos 15' (pen.), 48'	Report	Magnin 77' (pen.)	Stadium: Estadio Libertadores de América

29 January 2025 2	Talleres	2–3	Independiente	Córdoba
17:00 UTC−3	Vera 4' (o.g.); Depietri 85'	Report	Rodríguez 17' (o.g.); Spörle 38'; Cabral 90+1'	Stadium: Estadio Mario Alberto Kempes

2 February 2025 3	Independiente	2–0	Gimnasia La Plata	Avellaneda
21:30 UTC−3	Ávalos 10' (pen.); Angulo 81'	Report		Stadium: Estadio Libertadores de América

8 February 2025 4	River Plate	2–0	Independiente	Buenos Aires
20:15 UTC−3	Colidio 51', 90+2'	Report		Stadium: Estadio Monumental; Referee: Leandro Rey Hilfer

12 February 2025 5	Independiente	3–0	Vélez Sarsfield	Avellaneda
--:-- UTC−3	Ávalos 31', 43'; Cabral 78'	Report		Stadium: Estadio Libertadores de América

17 February 2025 6	Platense	1–1	Independiente	Florida
19:15 UTC−3	Paredes 89' (o.g.)	Report	Vázquez 76' (o.g.)	Stadium: Estadio Ciudad de Vicente López

22 February 2025 7	Independiente	2–0	Instituto	Avellaneda
18:00 UTC−3	Angulo 53'; Mancuello 71' (pen.)	Report		Stadium: Estadio Libertadores de América

4 March 2025 8	Banfield	0–0	Independiente	Banfield
19:30 UTC−3		Report		Stadium: Estadio Florencio Sola

8 March 2025 9	San Lorenzo	1–2	Independiente	Buenos Aires
17:00 UTC−3	Vombergar 22' (pen.)	Report	Millán 12'; Loyola 74'	Stadium: Estadio Pedro Bidegain

16 March 2025 10	Independiente	1–1	Racing	Avellaneda
16:00 UTC−3	Angulo 79'		Martirena 21'	Stadium: Estadio Libertadores de América

29 March 2025 11	Independiente	4–0	Godoy Cruz	Avellaneda
18:45 UTC−3	Loyola 2', 18'; Arce 25' (o.g.); Ávalos 35'	Report		Stadium: Estadio Libertadores de América

6 April 2025 12	Lanús	1–1	Independiente	Lanús
15:30 UTC−3	Salvio 57' (pen.)	Report	Galdames 4'	Stadium: Estadio Ciudad de Lanús

13 April 2025 13	Independiente	2–0	San Martín	Avellaneda
18:00 UTC−3	Ávalos 69', 82'	Report		Stadium: Estadio Libertadores de América

27 April 2025 14	Independiente	0–0	Deportivo Riestra	Avellaneda
21:15 UTC−3		Report		Stadium: Estadio Libertadores de América

30 April 2025 15	Atlético Tucumán	2–0	Independiente	Tucumán
21:00 UTC−3	Bajamich 24'; Díaz 87'	Report		Stadium: Estadio Monumental José Fierro

3 May 2025 16	Rosario Central	1–0	Independiente	Rosario
18:30 UTC−3	Spörle 20' (o.g.)	Report		Stadium: Estadio Gigante de Arroyito

===== Final stages =====
11 May 2025 Round of 16	Independiente	1–0	Independiente Rivadavia	Avellaneda
15:30	Montiel 56'	Report		Stadium: Libertadores de América; Referee: Hernán Mastángelo

19 May 2025 Quarter-finals	Boca Juniors	0–1	Independiente	Buenos Aires
20:30 UTC−3		Report	Angulo 63'	Stadium: La Bombonera; Referee: Nicolás Ramírez

24 May 2025 Semi-finals	Independiente	0–0 (5–6 p)	Huracán	Avellaneda
18:30		Report		Stadium: Libertadores de América; Referee: Hernán Mastrángelo
	Penalties
	Ávalos (penalty missed); Montiel (penalty scored); Galdames (penalty scored); Loyola (penalty scored); Lomónaco (penalty scored); Angulo (penalty scored); Hidalgo (penalty missed)		(penalty scored) Sequeira; (penalty scored) Guidara; (penalty scored) Pellegrino; (penalty scored) Miljevic; (penalty missed) Gil; (penalty scored) Pereyra; (penalty scored) Mazzantti

==== Torneo Clausura ====
===== League table =====
Pos	Team	Pld	W	D	L	GF	GA	GD	Pts
9	Sarmiento (J)	16	5	5	6	13	17	−4	20
10	San Martín (SJ)	16	4	7	5	13	16	−3	19
11	Independiente	16	4	6	6	14	13	+1	18
12	Atlético Tucumán	16	5	3	8	17	22	−5	18
13	Instituto	16	3	7	6	9	17	−8	16

Source: AFA

===== Results by round =====
Round	1
Ground	
Result	
Position	

A = Away; H = Home; W = Win; D = Draw; L = Loss

===== Matches =====
13 July 2025 1	Sarmiento	2–2	Independiente	Junín
14:15 UTC−3	Ardaiz 33'; Giménez 55'	Report	Ávalos 46'; Loyola 83'	Stadium: Estadio Eva Perón

20 July 2025 2	Independiente	1–2	Talleres	Avellaneda
21:00 UTC−3	Freire 56'	Report	Schott 27'; Depietri 79'	Stadium: Estadio Libertadores de América

27 July 2025 3	Gimnasia y Esgrima	1–0	Independiente	La Plata
16:00 UTC−3	Suso 24'	Report		Stadium: Estadio Juan Carmelo Zerillo

9 August 2025 4	Independiente	0–0	River Plate	Avellaneda
18:30 UTC−3		Report		Stadium: Estadio Libertadores de América

16 August 2025 5	Vélez Sarsfield	2–1	Independiente	Buenos Aires
19:00 UTC−3	Godoy 35' (pen.); Romero 84'	Report	Loyola 76' (pen.)	Stadium: José Amalfitani Stadium

29 August 2025 7	Instituto	0–0	Independiente	Córdoba
21:15 UTC−3		Report		Stadium: Estadio Monumental Presidente Perón; Referee: Luis Lobo Medina

13 September 2025 8	Independiente	0–1	Banfield	Avellaneda
16:45 UTC−3		Report	Río 37'	Stadium: Estadio Libertadores de América

21 September 2025 9	Independiente	1–1	San Lorenzo	Avellaneda
14:30 UTC−3	Tripichio 68' (o.g.)	Report	Gulli 37'	Stadium: Estadio Libertadores de América; Referee: Sebastían Zunino

28 September 2025 10	Racing	0–0	Independiente	Avellaneda
15:15 UTC−3		Report		Stadium: El Cilindro

5 October 2025 11	Godoy Cruz	1–1	Independiente	Godoy Cruz
14:30 UTC−3	Auzmendi 52'	Report	Montiel 23' (pen.)	Stadium: Estadio Feliciano Gambarte

12 October 2025 12	Independiente	0–2	Lanús	Avellaneda
21:15 UTC−3		Report	Bou 26'; Castillo 89'	Stadium: Estadio Libertadores de América

19 October 2025 13	San Martín	1–0	Independiente	San Juan
18:00 UTC−3	Fernández 61'	Report		Stadium: Estadio Ingeniero Hilario Sánchez

24 October 2025 6	Independiente	3–0	Platense	Avellaneda
18:00 UTC−3	Ávalos 25'; Loyola 40'; Millán 89'	Report		Stadium: Estadio Libertadores de América

1 November 2025 14	Independiente	3–0	Atlético Tucumán	Avellaneda
21:00 UTC−3	Abaldo 25'; Ávalos 30'; Loyola 55'	Report		Stadium: Estadio Libertadores de América

10 November 2025 15	Deportivo Riestra	0–1	Independiente	Buenos Aires
19:00 UTC−3		Report	Montiel 90+5'	Stadium: Estadio Guillermo Laza

15 November 2025 16	Independiente	1–0	Rosario Central	Avellaneda
21:30 UTC−3	Ávalos 28'	Report		Stadium: Estadio Libertadores de América

=== Copa Argentina ===
26 February 2025 Round of 64	Independiente	2–0	Sportivo Belgrano	San Nicolás de los Arroyos
21:30	Tarzia 30'; Mancuello 81' (pen.)	Report		Stadium: Único de San Nicolás; Referee: Andrés Gariano

29 June 2025 Round of 32	Gimnasia y Esgrima (M)	1–2	Independiente	La Punta
17:00	Mondino 29'	Report	Montiel 52' (pen.); Angulo 88'	Stadium: Estadio Juan Gilberto Funes; Referee: Sebastián Zunino

1 August 2025 Round of 16	Belgrano	2–0	Independiente	Rosario
17:10	Jara 45+1'; Zelarayán 71'	Report		Stadium: Gigante de Arroyito; Referee: Fernando Echenique

=== Copa Sudamericana ===
==== Group stage ====
Pos	Team	Pld	W	D	L	GF	GA	GD	Pts	Qualification
1	(Argentina) Independiente	6	4	0	2	16	6	+10	12	Advance to round of 16
2	(Paraguay) Guaraní	6	2	2	2	9	12	−3	8	Advance to knockout round play-offs
3	(Uruguay) Boston River	6	2	1	3	12	14	−2	7	
4	(Bolivia) Nacional Potosí	6	2	1	3	8	13	−5	7	

Source: CONMEBOL

1 April 2025 1	Nacional Potosí (Bolivia)	2–0	(Argentina) Independiente	Potosí, Bolivia
18:00 UTC−4	Ábrego 66'; Diellos 83'	Report		Stadium: Estadio Víctor Agustín Ugarte; Referee: Edina Alves (Brazil)

8 April 2025 2	Independiente (Argentina)	2–1	(Uruguay) Boston River	Avellaneda, Argentina
19:00 UTC−3	Galdames 61', 90+1'	Report	Muñoa 86'	Stadium: Estadio Libertadores de América; Referee: Bruno Arleu (Brazil)

22 April 2025 3	Guaraní (Paraguay)	2–1	(Argentina) Independiente	Asunción, Paraguay
19:00 UTC−3	Vargas 28', 80'	Report	Loyola 60'	Stadium: Estadio Defensores del Chaco (Note: Guaraní play their home matches at Estadio Defensores del Chaco, Asunción (originally scheduled at Estadio Arsenio Erico, Asunción) instead of their regular stadium Estadio Rogelio Livieres, Asunción which is being rebuilt.); Referee: Roberto Pérez (Peru)

6 May 2025 4	Boston River (Uruguay)	1–5	(Argentina) Independiente	Montevideo, Uruguay
21:30 UTC−3	Anello 7'	Report	Giménez 14', 61' (pen.); Millán 21'; Tarzia 46'; Hidalgo 90+2'	Stadium: Estadio Centenario (Note: Boston River played their home matches at Estadio Centenario, Montevideo instead of their regular stadium Estadio Campeones Olímpicos, Florida which did not meet CONMEBOL requirements.); Referee: Jhon Ospina (Colombia)

15 May 2025 5	Independiente (Argentina)	1–0	(Paraguay) Guaraní	Avellaneda, Argentina
19:00 UTC−3	Tarzia 43'	Report		Stadium: Estadio Libertadores de América; Referee: Flavio de Souza (Brazil)

28 May 2025 6	Independiente (Argentina)	7–0	(Bolivia) Nacional Potosí	Avellaneda, Argentina
19:00 UTC−3	Montiel 26', 53'; Tarzia 34'; Loyola 51'; Millán 77'; Echeverría 81' (o.g.); Galdames 84'	Report		Stadium: Estadio Libertadores de América; Referee: Paulo Zanovelli (Brazil)

==== Round of 16 ====
13 August 2025 First leg	Universidad de Chile	1–0	(Argentina) Independiente	Santiago, Chile
20:30 UTC−4	Assadi 36'	Report		Stadium: Estadio Nacional Julio Martínez Prádanos; Referee: Anderson Daronco (Brazil)

20 August 2025 Second leg	Independiente (Argentina)	1–1; Abandoned (Note: The Independiente v Universidad de Chile second leg match was abandoned in the 47th minute of play due to lack of security conditions. On 4 September 2025, CONMEBOL's Disciplinary Commission disqualified Independiente from the competition.) (1–2 agg.)	Universidad de Chile	Avellaneda, Argentina
21:30 UTC−3	Montiel 27'	Report	Assadi 11'	Stadium: Estadio Libertadores de América; Referee: Gustavo Tejera (Uruguay)
