= 2025 Club Atlético Huracán season =

Club Atlético Huracán
2025 season
- Manager: Frank Darío Kudelka
- Stadium: Estadio Tomás Adolfo Ducó
- Torneo Apertura: Runner-up
- Torneo Clausura: 3rd
- Copa Argentina: Round of 16
- Copa Sudamericana: Round of 16
Home colours	Away colours

The 2025 season is the 117th for Club Atlético Huracán and their 11th consecutive season in the Primera División. The club will also participate in the Copa Argentina and Copa Sudamericana.

== Squad ==
=== Current squad ===
As of 25 January, 2025.

Note: Flags indicate national team as defined under FIFA eligibility rules; some limited exceptions apply. Players may hold more than one non-FIFA nationality.

No.	Pos.	Nation	Player
1	GK	ECU	Hernán Galíndez
2	DF	ARG	Nicolás Goitea (on loan from Atlético Mitre)
3	DF	ARG	Lucas Carrizo
5	MF	MAS	Leonel Pérez
6	DF	ARG	Fabio Pereyra
7	FW	ARG	Matías Tissera (on loan from Ludogorets)
8	MF	CHI	Leonardo Gil
9	FW	ARG	Ramón Ábila
10	FW	ARG	Walter Mazzantti
11	FW	ARG	Agustín Urzi
15	MF	ARG	Agostino Spina
16	MF	ARG	Rodrigo Cabral
17	MF	ARG	Gabriel Alanís
18	MF	USA	Matko Miljevic

No.	Pos.	Nation	Player
19	DF	ARG	Leandro Lezcano
20	MF	ARG	Emmanuel Ojeda (on loan from Universidad de Chile)
21	MF	ARG	Franco Watson (on loan from Lanús)
22	DF	ARG	Daniel Zabala
23	MF	COL	Víctor Cantillo
24	DF	ARG	Tomás Guidara
25	DF	ARG	César Ibáñez
26	MF	ARG	Leonardo Sequeira
29	DF	ARG	Hernán de la Fuente
31	DF	ARG	Marco Pellegrino (on loan from Milan)
32	GK	ARG	Sebastián Meza
33	DF	ARG	Santiago Moya
43	FW	ARG	Eric Ramírez

=== Transfers In ===
Pos.	Player	Transferred from	Fee	Date	Source
FW	(Argentina) Matías Tissera	(Bulgaria) Ludogorets Razgrad	Loan	4 January 2025	
MF	(Colombia) Víctor Cantillo	(Colombia) Junior de Barranquilla	Free	14 January 2025	
DF	(Argentina) Marco Pellegrino	(Italy) AC Milan	Loan	18 January 2025	

=== Transfers Out ===
Pos.	Player	Transferred to	Fee	Date	Source
MF	(Argentina) Federico Fattori	(Argentina) Argentinos Juniors	€1,100,000	6 January 2025	
MF	(Uruguay) Pablo Siles	(Uruguay) Montevideo City Torque	Free	6 January 2025	
MF	(United States) Alan Soñora	(Paraguay) Cerro Porteño	Undisclosed	14 January 2025	
FW	(Paraguay) Marcelo Pérez	(Paraguay) Sportivo Luqueño	Loan	15 January 2025	
DF	(Chile) Rodrigo Echeverría	(Mexico) León	Undisclosed	21 January 2025	
DF	(Argentina) Marco Pellegrino	(Italy) AC Milan	End of loan	10 June 2025	

== Exhibition matches ==
12 January 2025	Danubio F.C. (Uruguay)	0–2	(Argentina) Huracán

15 January 2025	Colo Colo (Chile)	1–0	(Argentina) Huracán

== Competitions ==
=== Overall record ===
Competition	First match	Last match	Starting round	Final position	Record							
Competition	First match	Last match	Starting round	Final position	Pld	W	D	L	GF	GA	GD	Win %
Torneo Apertura	26 January 2025	1 June 2025	Matchday 1	Runner-up	20	9	7	4	23	15	+8	45.00
Torneo Clausura	13 July 2025		Matchday 1		9	3	3	3	5	8	−3	33.33
Copa Argentina	12 March 2025		Round of 64		3	1	1	1	2	3	−1	33.33
Copa Sudamericana	2 April 2025		Group stage		8	4	2	2	12	6	+6	50.00
Total					40	17	13	10	42	32	+10	42.50

Last updated: 3 July 2025
Source: Competitions

=== Primera División ===
==== Torneo Apertura ====
===== League table =====
Pos	Team	Pld	W	D	L	GF	GA	GD	Pts	Qualification
2	Boca Juniors	16	10	3	3	24	11	+13	33	Advance to round of 16
3	Racing	16	9	1	6	26	16	+10	28	Advance to round of 16
4	Huracán	16	7	6	3	19	12	+7	27	Advance to round of 16
5	Tigre	16	8	3	5	18	12	+6	27	Advance to round of 16
6	Independiente Rivadavia	16	7	6	3	20	17	+3	27	Advance to round of 16

Source: AFA

===== Results by round =====
Round	1
Ground	A
Result	
Position	

A = Away; H = Home; W = Win; D = Draw; L = Loss

===== Matches =====
26 January 2025 1	Belgrano	1–1	Huracán	Córdoba
21:00 UTC−3	Zabala 34' (o.g.)	Report	Mazzantti 38'	Stadium: El Gigante de Alberdi

29 January 2025 2	Huracán	0–0	Estudiantes	Buenos Aires
19:15 UTC−3		Report		Stadium: Estadio Tomás Adolfo Ducó

2 February 2025 3	Boca Juniors	2–1	Huracán	Buenos Aires
19:15 UTC−3	Cavani 18'; Palacios 67'	Report	Pellegrino 30'	Stadium: La Bombonera; Referee: Silvio Trucco

8 February 2025 4	Huracán	2–0	Tigre	Buenos Aires
--:-- UTC−3	Tissera 17'; Miljevic 83' (pen.)	Report		Stadium: Estadio Tomás Adolfo Ducó

12 February 2025 5	Argentinos Juniors	1–1	Huracán	Buenos Aires
20:00 UTC−3	Herrera 9'	Report	Ibáñez 57'	Stadium: Estadio Diego Armando Maradona

17 February 2025 6	Huracán	1–0	Unión	Buenos Aires
--:-- UTC−3	Miljevic 51' (pen.)	Report		Stadium: Estadio Tomás Adolfo Ducó

23 February 2025 7	Huracán	2–0	San Lorenzo	Buenos Aires
18:00 UTC−3	Pereyra 11'; Cabral 90'	Report		Stadium: Estadio Tomás Adolfo Ducó

2 March 2025 8	Vélez Sarsfield	0–2	Huracán	Buenos Aires
19:15 UTC−3		Report	Ramírez 22'; Tissera 80'	Stadium: José Amalfitani Stadium

8 March 2025 9	Racing	0–1	Huracán	Avellaneda
19:15 UTC−3		Report	Ramírez 25'	Stadium: El Cilindro

15 March 2025 10	Huracán	2–0	Independiente Rivadavia	Buenos Aires
21:00 UTC−3	Emmanuel Ojeda 69'; Ramírez 88' (pen.)	Report		Stadium: Estadio Tomás Adolfo Ducó

28 March 2025 11	Banfield	0–0	Huracán	Banfield
19:15 UTC−3		Report		Stadium: Estadio Florencio Sola

5 April 2025 12	Huracán	3–3	Aldosivi	Buenos Aires
18:00 UTC−3	Miljevic 24', 68'; Sequeira 48'	Report	Torres 20' (pen.); Palavecino 63'; Giani 80'	Stadium: Estadio Tomás Adolfo Ducó

14 April 2025 13	Central Córdoba	1–2	Huracán	Santiago del Estero
18:00 UTC−3	Leonardo Heredia 42' (pen.)	Report	Mazzantti 32'; Miljevic 58' (pen.)	Stadium: Estadio Único Madre de Ciudades

19 April 2025 14	Huracán	1–1	Defensa y Justicia	Buenos Aires
18:15 UTC−3	Lezcano 60'	Report	Ferreira 33'	Stadium: Estadio Tomás Adolfo Ducó

29 April 2025 15	Newell's Old Boys	2–0	Huracán	Rosario
--:-- UTC−3	Acuña 43'; Lollo 81'	Report		Stadium: Estadio Marcelo Bielsa

3 May 2025 16	Huracán	0–1	Barracas Central	Buenos Aires
21:00 UTC−3		Report	Jappert 49'	Stadium: Estadio Tomás Adolfo Ducó

===== Final stages =====
11 May 2025 Round of 16	Huracán	3–2	Deportivo Riestra	Buenos Aires
20:30	Ramírez 45+1', 68'; Sansotre 77' (o.g.)	Report	Alonso 58'; Benegas 81'	Stadium: Tomás Adolfo Ducó; Referee: Fernando Echenique

18 May 2025 Quarter-finals	Rosario Central	0–1	Huracán	Rosario
19:00		Report	Mazzantti 20'	Stadium: Gigante de Arroyito; Referee: Pablo Echavarría

24 May 2025 Semi-finals	Independiente	0–0 (5–6 p)	Huracán	Avellaneda
18:30		Report		Stadium: Libertadores de América; Referee: Hernán Mastrángelo
	Penalties
	Ávalos (penalty missed); Montiel (penalty scored); Galdames (penalty scored); Loyola (penalty scored); Lomónaco (penalty scored); Angulo (penalty scored); Hidalgo (penalty missed)		(penalty scored) Sequeira; (penalty scored) Guidara; (penalty scored) Pellegrino; (penalty scored) Miljevic; (penalty missed) Gil; (penalty scored) Pereyra; (penalty scored) Mazzantti

1 June 2025 Final	Huracán	0–1	Platense	Santiago del Estero
17:00		Report	Mainero 63'	Stadium: Estadio Único Madre de Ciudades; Referee: Facundo Tello

==== Torneo Clausura ====
===== League table =====
Pos	Team	Pld	W	D	L	GF	GA	GD	Pts
9	Banfield	16	6	3	7	15	21	−6	21
10	Belgrano	16	4	8	4	13	11	+2	20
11	Huracán	16	5	5	6	10	15	−5	20
12	Defensa y Justicia	16	5	4	7	14	19	−5	19
13	Aldosivi	16	5	3	8	13	18	−5	18

Source: AFA

===== Matches =====
12 July 2025 1	Huracán	0–3	Belgrano	Buenos Aires
18:30 UTC−3		Report	Jara 4'; Zelarayán 56'; Passerini 90+5'	Stadium: Estadio Tomás Adolfo Ducó

21 July 2025 2	Estudiantes	2–1	Huracán	La Plata
19:00 UTC−3	Cetré 65'; Castro 70'	Report	Pereyra 3'	Stadium: Estadio Jorge Luis Hirschi

27 July 2025 3	Huracán	1–0	Boca Juniors	Buenos Aires
18:30 UTC−3	Miljevic 65'	Report		Stadium: Estadio Tomás Adolfo Ducó; Referee: Leandro Rey Hilfer

8 August 2025 4	Tigre	0–1	Huracán	Victoria
19:00 UTC−3		Report	Gil 57'	Stadium: Estadio José Dellagiovanna

16 August 2025 5	Huracán	1–0	Argentinos Juniors	Buenos Aires
16:15 UTC−3	Urzi 87'	Report		Stadium: Estadio Tomás Adolfo Ducó

=== Copa Argentina ===
12 March 2025 Round of 64	Huracán	2–1	San Martin Formosa	Sarandí
21:10	Gil 33'; Ramírez 69'	Report	Vicedo 43'	Stadium: Julio Humberto Grondona; Referee: Pablo Echavarría

3 July 2025 Round of 32	Instituto	0–0 (2–3 p)	Huracán	Rosario
19:45		Report		Stadium: Marcelo Bielsa; Referee: Andrés Gariano
	Penalties
	Alarcón (penalty missed); Lodico (penalty missed); Rodríguez (penalty scored); Puebla (penalty scored); Luna (penalty missed)		(penalty missed) Gil; (penalty scored) Sequeira; (penalty scored) Guidara; (penalty scored) Pereyra

1 August 2025 Round of 16	Lanús	2–0	Huracán	Quilmes
20:45	Marcich 51'; Aquino 69'			Stadium: Centenario Ciudad de Quilmes

=== Copa Sudamericana ===
==== Group stage ====
Pos	Team	Pld	W	D	L	GF	GA	GD	Pts	Qualification
1	(Argentina) Huracán	6	4	2	0	11	2	+9	14	Advance to round of 16
2	(Colombia) América de Cali	6	1	5	0	6	4	+2	8	Advance to knockout round play-offs
3	(Brazil) Corinthians	6	2	2	2	5	5	0	8	
4	(Uruguay) Racing	6	0	1	5	3	14	−11	1	

Source: CONMEBOL
Rules for classification: 1) Points; 2) Goal difference; 3) Goals scored; 4) Away goals scored; 5) CONMEBOL ranking.

2 April 2025 1	Corinthians (Brazil)	1–2	(Argentina) Huracán	São Paulo, Brazil
19:00 UTC−3	Raniele 13'	Report	Sequeira 6', 37'	Stadium: Neo Química Arena; Attendance: 40,591; Referee: Cristian Garay (Chile)

9 April 2025 2	Huracán (Argentina)	5–0	(Uruguay) Racing	Buenos Aires
19:00 UTC−3	Pereyra 8'; Cotugno 19' (o.g.); De La Fuente 35'; Urzi 45+2'; Pérez 53'	Report		Stadium: Estadio Tomás Adolfo Ducó; Attendance: 8,690; Referee: Francisco Gilabert (Chile)

23 April 2025 3	Huracán (Argentina)	0–0	(Colombia) América de Cali	Buenos Aires
19:00 UTC−3		Report		Stadium: Estadio Tomás Adolfo Ducó; Attendance: 10,939; Referee: Augusto Aragón (Ecuador)

8 May 2025 4	Racing (Uruguay)	1–3	(Argentina) Huracán	Montevideo, Uruguay
19:00 UTC−3	Tomatis 25'	Report	Urzi 41'; Pereyra 55'; Cabral 90+5'	Stadium: Estadio Centenario (Note: Racing play their home matches at Estadio Centenario, Montevideo instead of their regular stadium Estadio Osvaldo Roberto, Montevideo which did not meet CONMEBOL requirements.); Referee: Augusto Menéndez (Peru)

14 May 2025 5	América de Cali (Colombia)	0–0	(Argentina) Huracán	Cali, Colombia
21:00 UTC−5		Report		Stadium: Estadio Pascual Guerrero; Referee: Cristian Garay (Chile)

27 May 2025 6	Huracán (Argentina)	1–0	(Brazil) Corinthians	Buenos Aires
21:30 UTC−3	Watson 47'	Report		Stadium: Estadio Tomás Adolfo Ducó; Referee: Gery Vargas (Bolivia)

==== Final stages ====
The draw for the round of 16 will be held on 2 June 2025, 12:00 PYT (UTC−3) at the CONMEBOL headquarters in Luque, Paraguay.

===== Round of 16 =====
12 August 2025 First leg	Once Caldas (Colombia)	1–0	(Argentina) Huracán	Manizales, Colombia
17:00 UTC−5	Moreno 57' (pen.)	Report		Stadium: Estadio Palogrande; Attendance: 16,954; Referee: Ramon Abatti (Brazil)

19 August 2025 Second leg	Huracán (Argentina)	1–3 (1–4 agg.)	(Colombia) Once Caldas	Buenos Aires
19:00 UTC−3	Miljevic 39' (pen.)	Report	Moreno 40', 88'; Barrios 65'	Stadium: Estadio Tomás Adolfo Ducó; Referee: Paulo Zanovelli (Brazil)
