= César Ibáñez =

César Ibáñez may refer to:

- César Ibáñez (footballer, born 1992), Mexican full-back
- César Ibáñez (footballer, born 1999), Argentine left-back
