= Rodrigo Rey =

Argentine footballer

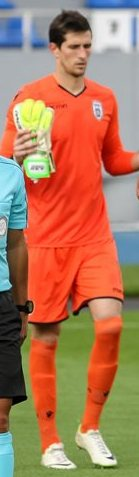

Personal information
- Full name: Rodrigo Rey
- Date of birth: 8 March 1991 (age 35)
- Place of birth: Las Parejas, Argentina
- Height: 1.90 m (6 ft 3 in)
- Position: Goalkeeper

Team information
- Current team: Independiente
- Number: 33

Youth career
- 2008–2010: River Plate

Senior career*
| Years | Team | Apps | (Gls) |
| 2010–2012 | River Plate | 0 | (0) |
| 2012–2014 | Newell's Old Boys | 0 | (0) |
| 2014–2017 | Godoy Cruz | 67 | (0) |
| 2017–2021 | PAOK | 12 | (0) |
| 2019 | → Pachuca (loan) | 18 | (0) |
| 2020 | → Godoy Cruz (loan) | 7 | (0) |
| 2021–2023 | Gimnasia LP | 77 | (0) |
| 2023– | Independiente | 134 | (0) |

International career
| 2011 | Argentina U20 | 0 | (0) |
Medal record
PAOK
| Winner | Greek Football Cup | 2017-2018 |
| Winner | Greek Football Cup | 2018-2019 |
| Winner | Super League | 2018–19 |
- * Club domestic league appearances and goals as of 17:54, 6 June 2026 (UTC)

Rodrigo Rey (born 8 March 1991) is an Argentine professional footballer who plays as a goalkeeper for Argentine Primera División club Independiente.

== Career ==
Rey came out of the youth development academy of the Club Atlético River Plate and developed a passion for the sport from an early age. His skills and abilities was the reason to be called in the Argentina U20 for the 2011 FIFA U-20 World Cup at Colombia. Having few chances to be part of the starting XI, along with the fact that the River decided to buy Marcelo Barovero for $2 million, Rey signed as a free transfer, with Newell's Old Boys in the summer of 2012. In Newell's Old Boys, he had to compete for a starting position against Nahuel Guzmán one of the best goalies in the country, making the competition for starting goalie was made even more difficult due to the club competing for the title in Primera División which they won that year with coaching staff deciding Guzmán was irreplaceable. He knew well that the only solution to get playing time was to join a team other than a top club. With a steady role in a rather smaller club, he chose Godoy Cruz, a team with moderate success in the Argentine league in modern history.

On 7 July 2017, Rodrigo Rey signed a three-year contract with Super League club PAOK, for an estimated transfer fee of €1.5 million. The administration of the Greek Cup winners decided to sign the 26-year-old Argentine goalkeeper instead of experienced Mexican international Guillermo Ochoa, because he was younger and there is also a strong chance Ochoa would be called up in his motherland's national team soon. On 27 July 2017, he made his debut in an away 1–1 draw for the 1st leg of UEFA Europa League third qualifying round against Olimpik Donetsk. On 28 May 2019, after a prolific season with the club, but as second goalie after the undisputed first goalkeeper Alexandros Paschalakis, he signed a year contract as a loanee with Liga MX club Pachuca despite the interest of other Argentinian clubs. However, this loan was cut short on 16 January 2020, as Rey was announced at Godoy Cruz after signing a new 6-month loan deal.

On 8 February 2021, Rey signed with Argentine Primera División side Gimnasia, keeping him with the club until December 2022.

== Career statistics ==
=== Club ===
As of 20 May 2026

Appearances and goals by club, season and competition
| Club | Season | League | | | National cup (Note: Includes Copa Argentina, Greek Cup) | | League Cup (Note: Includes Copa de la Superliga, Copa de la Liga) | | Continental | | Other | | Total | |
| Club | Season | Division | Apps | Goals | Apps | Goals | Apps | Goals | Apps | Goals | Apps | Goals | Apps | Goals |
|---|---|---|---|---|---|---|---|---|---|---|---|---|---|---|
| Godoy Cruz | 2015 | Primera División | 22 | 0 | 0 | 0 | — | | — | | — | | 22 | 0 |
| Godoy Cruz | 2016 | Primera División | 16 | 0 | 3 | 0 | — | | — | | 1 (Note: Appearance(s) in Primera División Third Place Play-Off) | 0 | 20 | 0 |
| Godoy Cruz | 2016–17 | Primera División | 28 | 0 | 1 | 0 | — | | 7 (Note: Appearance(s) in Copa Libertadores) | 0 | — | | 36 | 0 |
| Godoy Cruz | Total | | 66 | 0 | 4 | 0 | 0 | 0 | 7 | 0 | 1 | 0 | 78 | 0 |
| PAOK | 2017–18 | Super League Greece | 12 | 0 | 2 | 0 | — | | 4 (Note: Appearance(s) in UEFA Europa League) | 0 | — | | 18 | 0 |
| PAOK | 2018–19 | Super League Greece | 0 | 0 | 3 | 0 | — | | — | | — | | 3 | 0 |
| PAOK | Total | | 12 | 0 | 5 | 0 | 0 | 0 | 4 | 0 | 0 | 0 | 21 | 0 |
| Pachuca (loan) | 2019–20 | Liga MX | 18 | 0 | 0 | 0 | — | | — | | — | | 18 | 0 |
| Godoy Cruz (loan) | 2019–20 | Primera División | 7 | 0 | — | | 1 | 0 | — | | — | | 8 | 0 |
| Gimnasia LP (loan) | 2019–20 | Primera División | — | | 1 (Note: Due to Covid-19 the 2019–20 Copa Argentina was finished during the 2020–21 season) | 0 | — | | — | | — | | 1 | 0 |
| Gimnasia LP (loan) | 2021 | Primera División | 25 | 0 | — | | 12 | 0 | — | | — | | 37 | 0 |
| Gimnasia LP (loan) | 2022 | Primera División | 27 | 0 | 3 | 0 | 14 | 0 | — | | — | | 44 | 0 |
| Gimnasia LP (loan) | Total | | 52 | 0 | 4 | 0 | 26 | 0 | 0 | 0 | 0 | 0 | 82 | 0 |
| Independiente | 2023 | Primera División | 27 | 0 | 3 | 0 | 14 | 0 | — | | — | | 44 | 0 |
| Independiente | 2024 | Primera División | 27 | 0 | 4 | 0 | 14 | 0 | — | | — | | 45 | 0 |
| Independiente | 2025 | Primera División | 32 | 0 | 3 | 0 | — | | 8 (Note: Appearance(s) in Copa Sudamericana) | 0 | 3 (Note: Appearance(s) in AFA Liga Profesional de Fútbol Apertura Play-Offs) | 0 | 46 | 0 |
| Independiente | 2026 | Primera División | 16 | 0 | 0 | 0 | — | | — | | 1 | 0 | 17 | 0 |
| Independiente | Total | | 102 | 0 | 10 | 0 | 28 | 0 | 8 | 0 | 4 | 0 | 152 | 0 |
| Career total | | | 257 | 0 | 23 | 0 | 55 | 0 | 19 | 0 | 5 | 0 | 359 | 0 |

== Honours ==
Newell's Old Boys

- Primera División: 2013 Final

PAOK

- Super League Greece: 2018–19
- Greek Cup: 2017–18, 2018–19
