= Santiago Hidalgo =

Argentine footballer (born 2005)

Personal information
- Full name: Santiago Hidalgo Massa
- Date of birth: 17 February 2005 (age 21)
- Place of birth: Santiago del Estero, Argentina
- Height: 1.71 m (5 ft 7 in)
- Position: Forward

Team information
- Current team: Toulouse
- Number: 9

Youth career
- San Lorenzo
- 2016–2022: Independiente

Senior career*
| Years | Team | Apps | (Gls) |
| 2022–2025 | Independiente | 38 | (1) |
| 2025– | Toulouse | 31 | (4) |

International career
- Argentina U17
Medal record
Men's football
Representing Argentina
South American U-20 Championship
| Runner-up | 2025 Venezuela |
- * Club domestic league appearances and goals as of 3 September 2026

Santiago Hidalgo Massa (born 17 February 2005) is an Argentine footballer currently playing as a forward for Ligue 1 club Toulouse.

== Club career ==
Hidalgo had a brief spell with San Lorenzo, before joining Independiente at the age of eleven.

In September 2022, he was named by English newspaper The Guardian as one of the best players born in 2005 worldwide.

On 31 July 2025, Hidalgo signed for French side Toulouse for a transfer sum of €2.50m.

== Career statistics ==
As of 21 April 2026

| Club | Season | League | | | Cup | | Continental | | Other | | Total | |
| Club | Season | Division | Apps | Goals | Apps | Goals | Apps | Goals | Apps | Goals | Apps | Goals |
|---|---|---|---|---|---|---|---|---|---|---|---|---|
| Independiente | 2022 | Argentine Primera División | 2 | 0 | 0 | 0 | — | | — | | 2 | 0 |
| Independiente | 2023 | Argentine Primera División | 11 | 0 | 1 | 0 | — | | — | | 12 | 0 |
| Independiente | 2024 | Argentine Primera División | 15 | 1 | 1 | 0 | — | | — | | 16 | 1 |
| Independiente | 2025 | Argentine Primera División | 10 | 0 | 1 | 0 | 4 | 1 | — | | 15 | 1 |
| Independiente | Total | | 38 | 1 | 3 | 0 | 4 | 1 | 0 | 0 | 45 | 2 |
| Toulouse | 2025–26 | Ligue 1 | 25 | 4 | 4 | 2 | — | | — | | 29 | 6 |
| Career total | | | 63 | 5 | 7 | 2 | 4 | 1 | 0 | 0 | 74 | 8 |
