= Santiago Montiel =

Argentine footballer

Personal information
- Full name: Santiago Gabriel Montiel
- Date of birth: 22 November 2000 (age 25)
- Place of birth: Gregorio de Laferrère, Buenos Aires, Argentina
- Height: 1.66 m (5 ft 5 in)
- Positions: Winger; right-back

Team information
- Current team: Independiente
- Number: 7

Youth career
- Deportivo Laferrere
- 2015–2022: River Plate

Senior career*
Years	Team	Apps	(Gls)
2023–2024	Argentinos Juniors	52	(4)
2024–	Independiente	52	(8)
- * Club domestic league appearances and goals as of 17:38, 6 June 2026 (UTC)

Santiago Gabriel Montiel (born 22 November 2000) is an Argentine professional footballer who plays as a winger for Independiente.

== Career ==
Montiel came through the youth system at River Plate after signing from Deportivo Laferrere in 2015. In February 2022, he joined Argentinos Juniors as a free agent.

He made his debut on 5 February 2023 in a win against Racing Club. On the opening game of the 2024 Copa de la Liga Profesional on 28 January 2024, he scored against his former side River Plate.

On August 14 2024, he signed for Independiente for a fee of $1.5 million for 50% of his transfer to be paid in three installments. River Plate also received approximately 3% of the sale. Three days after signing, on 17 August 2025, he made his debut for Independiente in a 1–0 win against Rosario Central, coming on as a second-half substitute.

On December 16 2025, Santiago Montiel won the 2025 FIFA Puskás Award for a bicycle kick goal against Independiente Rivadavia.

== Personal life ==
He is the cousin of fellow Argentine footballer Gonzalo Montiel, who is a regular with the national team and have won many international titles including the FIFA World Cup in 2022, scoring the winning penalty during the shoot-out in the final.

== Career statistics ==
As of 3 October 2025

Appearances and goals by club, season and competition
Club	Season	League			Cup (Note: Includes Copa Argentina)		Continental		Other		Total	
Club	Season	Division	Goals	Apps	Apps	Goals	Apps	Goals	Apps	Goals	Apps	Goals
Argentinos Juniors	2023	Argentine Primera División	36	2	3	0	7 (Note: Appearances in Copa Libertadores)	0	—		46	2
Argentinos Juniors	2024	Argentine Primera División	16	2	2	0	5 (Note: Appearances in Copa Sudamericana)	0	—		23	2
Argentinos Juniors	Total		52	4	5	0	12	0	0	0	69	4
Independiente	2024	Argentine Primera División	14	4	2	1	0	0	—		16	5
Independiente	2025	Argentine Primera División	20	1	3	1	7 (Note: Appearances in Copa Sudamericana)	3	—		30	5
Independiente	Total		34	5	5	2	7	3	0	0	46	10
Career total			86	9	10	2	19	3	0	0	115	14

== Honours ==
Individual

- FIFA Puskás Award: 2025
