= César Ibáñez (footballer, born 1999) =

Argentine professional footballer

Personal information
- Full name: César Roman Ibáñez
- Date of birth: 17 June 1999 (age 27)
- Place of birth: Villa Fiorito, Argentina
- Height: 1.79 m (5 ft 10 in)
- Position: Left-back

Team information
- Current team: Huracán
- Number: 25

Youth career
- 2007–2019: Huracán

Senior career*
Years	Team	Apps	(Gls)
2019–	Huracán	136	(2)
- * Club domestic league appearances and goals as of 20:29, 17 June 2026 (UTC)

César Roman Ibáñez (born 17 June 1999) is an Argentine professional footballer who plays as a left-back for Huracán.

== Club career ==
Ibáñez came through the youth ranks of Huracán, having joined at the age of eight. He was moved into their first-team squad in 2018–19, making his senior debut on 15 May 2019, coming on as a late substitute for Christian Chimino in a 2–0 Copa Argentina victory over Unión de Sunchales at the Estadio Brigadier General Estanislao López.

On 14 September 2019, under new manager Juan Pablo Vojvoda, Ibáñez made his first appearance in the Primera División by playing the full duration of a 4–0 home defeat to River Plate. Regularly used under Vojvoda, he suffered a knee injury in October 2020, being sidelined for the remainder of the year.

Back to action in May 2021, Ibáñez quickly regained his starting spot, and scored his first professional goal on 8 October of that year, in a 2–1 away win over Central Córdoba de Santiago del Estero. In June 2022, however, he ruptured the anterior cruciate ligament of his left knee.

On 10 September 2025, Ibáñez extended his contract with Huracán through December 2028.

== International career ==
Ibáñez was called up to train with the Argentina national under-19 team in February 2018.

== Career statistics ==
As of 17 June 2026.

Appearances and goals by club, season and competition
Club	Season	League			Cup (Note: Includes the Copa Argentina)		League Cup (Note: Includes the Copa de la Superliga)		Continental		Other		Total	
Club	Season	Division	Apps	Goals	Apps	Goals	Apps	Goals	Apps	Goals	Apps	Goals	Apps	Goals
Huracán	2018–19	Liga Profesional	0	0	1	0	0	0	—		—		1	0
Huracán	2019–20	Liga Profesional	15	0	0	0	1	0	2 (Note: Appearance(s) in Copa Sudamericana)	0	—		18	0
Huracán	2020–21	Liga Profesional	0	0	0	0	—		—		—		0	0
Huracán	2021	Liga Profesional	17	1	0	0	—		—		—		17	1
Huracán	2022	Liga Profesional	14 (Note: Soccerway counts Copa de la Liga Profesional appearances as league appearances.)	0	1	0	—		—		—		15	0
Huracán	2023	Liga Profesional	14	0	0	0	—		1	0	—		15	0
Huracán	2024	Liga Profesional	29	0	3	0	—		—		—		32	0
Huracán	2025	Liga Profesional	31	1	3	0	—		7	0	—		41	1
Huracán	2026	Liga Profesional	16	0	1	0	—		—		—		17	0
Career total			136	2	9	0	1	0	10	0	0	0	156	2
