= Diego Tarzia =

Argentine footballer (born 2003)

Personal information
- Date of birth: 26 April 2003 (age 23)
- Place of birth: Buenos Aires, Argentina
- Height: 1.74 m (5 ft 9 in)
- Position: Winger

Team information
- Current team: Vitória (on loan from Independiente)
- Number: 12

Youth career
- Independiente

Senior career*
Years	Team	Apps	(Gls)
2024–	Independiente	49	(0)
2026–	→ Vitória (loan)	4	(0)
- * Club domestic league appearances and goals as of 8 April 2026

Diego Tarzia (born 26 April 2003) is an Argentine footballer who plays as a left winger for Brazilian club Vitória, on loan from Independiente.

== Career ==
=== Independiente ===
Born in Buenos Aires, Tarzia played for the youth sides of Independiente, first appearing with the reserves in 2021. He made his first team – and Primera División – debut on 13 February 2024, coming on as a second-half substitute for Alex Luna in a 1–0 home win over Rosario Central.

Tarzia scored his first goal on 28 August 2024, netting his team's third in a 3–0 away win over Godoy Cruz, for the year's Copa Argentina. In October, he was separated from the squad after being caught on a party in a yacht, before being reintegrated in the following month.

On 13 March 2025, Tarzia renewed his contract with the Rojo until December 2027.

==== Loan to Vitória ====
On 10 February 2026, Campeonato Brasileiro Série A side Vitória announced the signing of Tarzia on loan until the end of the year.

== Career statistics ==
As of 11 February 2026

Club	Season	League			Cup		Continental		State league		Other		Total	
Club	Season	Division	Apps	Goals	Apps	Goals	Apps	Goals	Apps	Goals	Apps	Goals	Apps	Goals
Independiente	2024	Liga Profesional	21 (Note: Soccerway counts Copa de la Liga Profesional appearances as league appearances.)	0	3	1	—		—		—		24	1
Independiente	2025	Liga Profesional	29	0	3	1	7 (Note: Appearance(s) in Copa Sudamericana)	3	—		—		39	4
Independiente	2026	Liga Profesional	1	0	0	0	—		—		—		1	0
Independiente	Total		51	0	6	2	7	3	—		—		64	5
Vitória (loan)	2026	Série A	0	0	0	0	—		0	0	0	0	0	0
Career total			51	0	6	2	7	3	0	0	0	0	64	5
