= Lautaro Millán =

Chilean footballer

Personal information
- Full name: Giovanni Lautaro Millán
- Date of birth: 16 August 2005 (age 21)
- Place of birth: Bahía Blanca, Argentina
- Height: 1.69 m (5 ft 7 in)
- Position: Attacking midfielder

Team information
- Current team: Independiente
- Number: 14

Youth career
- Vista Alegre
- La Armonía
- 2020–2024: Independiente

Senior career*
Years	Team	Apps	(Gls)
2024–	Independiente	53	(5)

International career^{‡}
2024	Argentina U20	8	(1)
2025	Chile U20	4	(1)
2025–	Chile	4	(0)
- * Club domestic league appearances and goals as of 22:13, 19 September 2026 (UTC) ‡ National team caps and goals as of 9 June 2026

Giovanni Lautaro Millán (born 16 August 2005) is a professional footballer who plays as an attacking midfielder for Independiente. Born in Argentina, he represents the Chile national team.

== Club career ==
Born in Bahía Blanca, Argentina, Millán was with Villa Alegre and La Armonía before joining Independiente in 2020, with whom he won the 2023 Copa de la Liga with the reserve team. He signed his first professional contract on 27 February 2024 and made his senior debut in the Argentine Primera División match against Vélez Sarsfield on 26 May 2024. As a starting player, he entered by first time in the match against Banfield on 13 June of the same year under Hugo Tocalli.

== International career ==
During 2024, Millán was frequently called up to the Argentina U20 squad. He scored his first goal in the 2–2 draw against Uzbekistan on 13 October of the same year.

In 2025, Millán switched to the Chile under-20 team and was included in the final squad for the 2025 FIFA U20 World Cup. He made his debut and scored the first goal in the 2–1 win against New Zealand.

Following the 2025 FIFA U20 World Cup, Millán was called up to the Chile senior team for the match against Peru on 10 October 2025.

== Personal life ==
His father is Chilean.

== Career statistics ==
=== International ===
As of match played 9 June 2026

Appearances and goals by national team and year
National team	Year	Apps	Goals
Chile	2025	2	0
Chile	2026	2	0
Total		4	0
