= Matko Miljevic =

American soccer player (born 2001)

Personal information
- Full name: Matko Mijael Miljevic
- Date of birth: May 9, 2001 (age 25)
- Place of birth: Miami, Florida, United States
- Height: 5 ft 7 in (1.70 m)
- Position: Attacking midfielder

Team information
- Current team: Racing Club
- Number: 10

Youth career
- Boca Juniors
- 2011–2018: Argentinos Juniors

Senior career*
Years	Team	Apps	(Gls)
2018–2021	Argentinos Juniors	6	(1)
2021–2024	CF Montréal	35	(2)
2024–2025	Newell's Old Boys	22	(2)
2025–2026	Huracán	34	(7)
2026–	Racing Club	26	(2)

International career^{‡}
2017	United States U16	5	(0)
2019	Argentina U18		
2018	Argentina U20	2	(0)
2020	United States U20	2	(0)
2025–	United States	2	(1)
- * Club domestic league appearances and goals as of 18:04, 8 November 2026 (UTC) ‡ National team caps and goals as of January 22, 2025

Matko Mijael Miljevic (born May 9, 2001) is an American professional soccer player who plays as a midfielder for Argentine Primera División club Racing Club and the United States national team.

== Club career ==
=== Argentinos Juniors ===
Prior to signing for Argentinos Juniors in 2011, Miljevic had a short stint with the Boca Juniors academy. The 2018–19 campaign saw the midfielder appear in senior football, firstly as an unused substitute for league fixtures with Tigre and Huracán in November/December 2018. Miljevic was named as a substitute for a Copa de la Superliga round of sixteen match against San Lorenzo in the succeeding April, subsequently making his professional bow in a 1–0 first leg win at the Estadio Diego Armando Maradona. His Primera División debut arrived on August 26 versus Huracán, while his first goal came on August 31 against Gimnasia y Esgrima.

=== CF Montréal ===
On August 20, 2021, it was announced that Miljevic signed a three-and-a-half-year contract with CF Montréal. He made his club debut on September 22, starting and scoring his side's first in a 3–1 away win over HFX Wanderers FC for the Canadian Championship.

On September 13, 2023, it was reported that Miljevic, against the terms of his contract with CF Montréal, played three matches in the indoor amateur Québec Calcetto Soccer League, using the false name Matko Milojevic, where he tallied six goals and two assists. Additionally, while spectating a match in the league, he was also alleged to have spat on and struck a player in the face, resulting in his ejection from the soccer centre where the game was being played and lifetime suspension from the league. On September 18, 2023, MLS terminated Miljevic's contract for engaging in conduct detrimental to the league and violating his Standard Player Agreement.

=== Newell's Old Boys ===
On February 6, 2024, Miljevic returned to Argentina for a second time, signing with Primera División club Newell's Old Boys. He left Newell's Old Boys on January 1, 2025.

=== Huracán ===
On January 11, 2025, Miljevic was announced at Huracán on a three-year deal, after the club bought 50% of his economic rights.

== International career ==
Miljevic is eligible to play for Argentina, Bosnia and Herzegovina, Croatia, or the United States at international level. He played for latter's U16s at the 2017 Montaigu Tournament, before appearing for the Argentina U20s in a friendly with Uruguay in August 2018. July 2019 saw Miljevic receive a call-up from the Argentina U18s for the L'Alcúdia International Tournament in Spain. He scored on matchdays one and two against Mauritania and Spain respectively. In August 2019, Tab Ramos called Miljevic up for September friendlies with the United States U20s, but Argentinos denied his release. On January 8, 2020, Miljevic was released to the United States U20s for January friendlies where he made two appearances against the Mexico U20s.

On January 6, 2025, Miljevic was called up to the United States national team by Mauricio Pochettino for two friendlies against Venezuela and Costa Rica. He made his full international debut twelve days later, starting and scoring USMNT's third in a 3–1 win over the former at the Chase Stadium in Fort Lauderdale, Florida.

== Personal life ==
Miljevic was born in Miami, Florida to Argentine parents after his family moved to the United States due to the 1998–2002 Argentine great depression. He is of Bosnian Croat descent via his grandfather who was born in Banja Luka, present-day Bosnia and Herzegovina, and emigrated to Argentina in 1945. Miljevic began the process of applying for a Croatian passport in 2018. He took part in taekwondo as a youngster, winning the Argentina Open in 2014 and 2015.

== Career statistics ==
=== Club ===
As of match played February 23, 2025

Appearances and goals by club, season and competition
Club	Season	League			National cup (Note: Includes Copa Argentina, Canadian Championship)		Continental		Other		Total	
Club	Season	Division	Apps	Goals	Apps	Goals	Apps	Goals	Apps	Goals	Apps	Goals
Argentinos Juniors	2018–19	Argentine Primera División	0	0	2	0	2 (Note: Appearance(s) in Copa Sudamericana)	0	4 (Note: Appearances in Copa de la Superliga)	0	8	0
Argentinos Juniors	2019–20	Argentine Primera División	6	1	—		1	0	0	0	7	1
Argentinos Juniors	Total		6	1	2	0	3	0	4	0	15	1
Montréal	2021	MLS	5	1	2	1	—		—		7	2
Montréal	2022	MLS	22	1	2	0	4 (Note: Appearances in CONCACAF Champions Cup)	0	—		28	1
Montréal	2023	MLS	8	0	2	0	—		—		10	0
Montréal	Total		35	2	6	1	4	0	—		45	3
Newell's Old Boys	2024	Argentine Primera División	22	2	2	0	—		—		24	2
Huracán	2025	Argentine Primera División	22	6	2	0	4	0	—		28	6
Career total			69	7	10	1	7	0	4	0	90	8

=== International ===
As of match played January 22, 2025

Appearances and goals by national team and year
National team	Year	Apps	Goals
United States	2025	2	1
Total		2	1

United States score listed first, score column indicates score after each Miljevic goal.

List of international goals scored by Matko Miljevic
No.	Date	Venue	Cap	Opponent	Score	Result	Competition
1	January 18, 2025	Chase Stadium, Fort Lauderdale, United States	1	Venezuela	3–0	3–1	Friendly
