= Cristian Zermatten =

Argentinian association football player

Personal information
- Full name: Cristian Gastón Zermatten
- Date of birth: 31 October 1974 (age 51)
- Place of birth: Isidro Casanova, Argentina
- Height: 1.76 m (5 ft 9 in)
- Position: Midfielder

Team information
- Current team: Argentinos Juniors (reserve manager)

Youth career
- Argentinos Juniors

Senior career*
Years	Team	Apps	(Gls)
1992–1998	Argentinos Juniors	145	(14)
1998–2000	Pumas UNAM	33	(1)
2000–2001	Argentinos Juniors	0	(0)
2001–2002	Colón	22	(1)
2002	Huracán	12	(1)
2003	Deportivo Cuenca	13	(2)
2003	Universitario	11	(2)
2004	The Strongest	22	(8)
2005	Bolívar	4	(0)
2005	Nacional Montevideo	12	(2)
2006–2008	Nueva Chicago	57	(8)
2008–2009	Talleres	30	(3)
2009–2010	Ferro Carril Oeste	28	(0)
2010–2011	Tristán Suárez	18	(0)

Managerial career
- 2014–2016: Argentina U20 (assistant)
- 2022–: Argentinos Juniors (reserves)
- 2023: Argentinos Juniors (interim)
- 2024: Argentinos Juniors (interim)
- * Club domestic league appearances and goals

Cristian Gastón Zermatten (born 31 October 1974) is an Argentine football manager and former player who played as a midfielder. He is the current manager of Argentinos Juniors' reserve team.

== Playing career ==
Zermatten started his senior career with Argentinos Juniors. In 1998, he signed for Club Universidad Nacional in the Mexican Liga MX, where he made 33 league appearances and scored one goal. After that, he returned to Argentinos in 2000, but did not play.

Zermatten subsequently represented Club Atlético Colón, Club Atlético Huracán, C.D. Cuenca, Club Universitario de Deportes, The Strongest, Club Bolívar, Club Nacional de Football, Club Atlético Nueva Chicago, Talleres de Córdoba, Ferro Carril Oeste, and CSyD Tristán Suárez.
