= Franco Paredes =

Argentine footballer

Personal information
- Full name: Franco Ezequiel Paredes
- Date of birth: 18 March 1999 (age 27)
- Place of birth: San Justo, Argentina
- Height: 1.76 m (5 ft 9 in)
- Position: Centre-back

Team information
- Current team: Argentinos Juniors (on loan from Independiente)
- Number: 17

Youth career
- 2007–2020: River Plate

Senior career*
Years	Team	Apps	(Gls)
2020–2025	River Plate	0	(0)
2020–2021	→ Defensa y Justicia (loan)	22	(3)
2023	→ Racing de Montevideo (loan)	6	(0)
2023–2024	→ Sarmiento (loan)	43	(2)
2025–	Independiente	9	(0)
2026–	→ Argentinos Juniors (loan)	0	(0)
- * Club domestic league appearances and goals as of 18:25, 13 February 2026 (UTC)

Franco Ezequiel Paredes (born 18 March 1999) is an Argentine professional footballer who plays as a centre-back for Argentinos Juniors, on loan from Independiente.

== Career ==
Paredes joined River Plate in 2007. He made the jump from academy to reserves in 2016, before making his breakthrough into the first-team under Marcelo Gallardo in February 2020. Paredes was soon registered for the Copa Libertadores, a competition that would see him make his senior debut in on 4 March 2020 against L.D.U. Quito; he played the full duration as River lost 3–0, with ten men, in Group D. In August, Paredes was loaned to fellow Primera División club Defensa y Justicia. Hernán Crespo gave him his first appearance in the Libertadores too, as they lost away to Santos on 21 October.

== Personal life ==
Paredes' cousin, Leandro, is also a professional footballer.

== Career statistics ==
As of 5 November 2020

Appearances and goals by club, season and competition
Club	Season	League			Cup		League Cup		Continental		Other		Total	
Club	Season	Division	Apps	Goals	Apps	Goals	Apps	Goals	Apps	Goals	Apps	Goals	Apps	Goals
River Plate	2019–20	Primera División	0	0	0	0	0	0	1 (Note: Appearance(s) in the Copa Libertadores)	0	0	0	1	0
River Plate	2020–21	Primera División	0	0	0	0	0	0	0	0	0	0	0	0
River Plate	Total		0	0	0	0	0	0	1	0	0	0	1	0
Defensa y Justicia (loan)	2020–21 (Note: Soccerway counts Copa de la Liga Profesional appearances as league appearances.)	Primera División	0	0	0	0	0	0	2 (Note: Appearance(s) in the Copa Libertadores and Copa Sudamericana)	0	0	0	2	0
Career total			0	0	0	0	0	0	3	0	0	0	3	0
