= Agostino Spina =

Argentine professional footballer

Personal information
- Full name: Agostino Luigi Spina
- Date of birth: 31 October 2001 (age 25)
- Place of birth: Argentina
- Position: Midfielder

Team information
- Current team: Aucas (on loan from Huracán)
- Number: 21

Youth career
- Huracán

Senior career*
Years	Team	Apps	(Gls)
2021–	Huracán	8	(1)
2022	→ Unión Magdalena (loan)	19	(0)
2024	→ Unión Magdalena (loan)	38	(2)
2025–	→ Aucas (loan)	6	(0)
- * Club domestic league appearances and goals as of 17:13, 9 July 2025 (UTC)

Agostino Luigi Spina (born 31 October 2001) is an Argentine professional footballer who plays as a midfielder for Ecuadorian Serie A club Aucas, on loan from Huracán.

== Career ==
Spina began his career with Huracán. He trained with Israel Damonte's first-team squad at various points across 2020, notably featuring in a friendly match with Arsenal de Sarandí in October. Spina made his debut at the age of nineteen on 14 February 2021 against Defensa y Justicia in the Copa de la Liga Profesional, with the central midfielder scoring his first goal in the process at the Estadio Norberto "Tito" Tomaghello. Spina signed his first professional contract with Huracán on 27 May 2021.

At the end of June 2022, Spina joined Colombian Categoría Primera A side Unión Magdalena.

On 4 March 2024, Spina returned to Unión Magdalena on loan through the end of the year.

On 26 June 2025, Spina signed a contract extension with Huracán through December 2027, simultaneously joining Ecuadorian club S.D. Aucas on loan through June 2026.

== Career statistics ==
As of 21 December 2025.

Appearances and goals by club, season and competition
Club	Season	League			Cup		League Cup		Continental		Other		Total	
Club	Season	Division	Apps	Goals	Apps	Goals	Apps	Goals	Apps	Goals	Apps	Goals	Apps	Goals
Huracán	2021	Primera División	0	0	0	0	2	1	—		—		2	1
Unión Magdalena (loan)	2022	Categoría Primera A	19	0	4	0	0	0	—		—		23	0
Huracán	2023	Primera División	5	0	0	0	0	0	—		—		5	0
Huracán	2024	Primera División	0	0	0	0	1	0	—		—		1	0
Huracán	Total		5	0	0	0	1	0	0	0	0	0	6	0
Unión Magdalena (loan)	2024	Categoría Primera B	37	2	0	0	0	0	—		—		37	2
Aucas (loan)	2025	LigaPro Serie A	19	0	0	0	0	0	0	0	0	0	19	0
Career total			80	2	4	0	3	1	—		0	0	87	3
