= Juan Carlos Roldán =

Argentine footballer and manager (born 1963)

Personal information
- Full name: Juan Carlos Roldán
- Date of birth: 9 August 1963 (age 63)
- Place of birth: Santiago del Estero, Argentina
- Position: Midfielder

Team information
- Current team: Central Córdoba (interim)

Youth career
- 1978–1984: Central Córdoba

Senior career*
Years	Team	Apps	(Gls)
1984–1987	Central Córdoba	77	(15)
1987–1991	Newell's Old Boys	34	(2)
1987–1988	→ Irapuato (loan)		
1991–1993	Banfield	81	(9)
1993–1995	Quilmes	60	(6)
1995–1996	Douglas Haig	39	(2)
1996–1998	Cipolletti	44	(4)
1998–1999	Central Córdoba	16	(2)
Total		360	(40)

Managerial career
- 1999: Central Argentino
- 2005: Central Córdoba
- 200X–2013: Central Córdoba (assistant)
- 2011: Central Córdoba (interim)
- 2012: Central Córdoba (interim)
- 2013–2014: Central Córdoba
- 2023–: Central Córdoba (reserves)
- 2024: Central Córdoba (interim)
- 2026–: Central Córdoba (interim)
- * Club domestic league appearances and goals

Juan Carlos Roldán (born 9 August 1963) is an Argentine football manager and former player who played as a midfielder. He is the current interim manager of Central Córdoba.

== Playing career ==
Born in Santiago del Estero, Roldán began his career with hometown side Central Córdoba, before being sold to Newell's Old Boys and sent out on loan to Mexican club Irapuato. Upon returning, he started to feature more regularly, winning the 1990–91 Argentine Primera División title with the club.

Roldán subsequently represented Banfield, Quilmes, Douglas Haig and Cipolletti before returning to his first club Central in 1998. He retired in the following year, aged 35.

== Managerial career ==
Roldán began his managerial career with lowly side Central Argentino, shortly after retiring. He would later manage his former side Central Córdoba on several occasions, mostly as an interim, before being definitely appointed manager of the club on 17 October 2013, replacing Salvador Ragusa.

Roldán was removed from the manager role on 30 May 2014, after the club were seeking a "more experienced" manager. In December 2022, he was named in charge of Central's reserve team.

On 9 April 2024, Roldán was appointed interim manager of Central until the end of the 2024 Copa de la Liga Profesional.

== Honours ==
=== Player ===
Newell's Old Boys

- Argentine Primera División: 1990–91
