= Ernesto Pedernera =

Argentine footballer

Personal information
- Full name: Ernesto Ceferino Pedernera
- Date of birth: 9 January 1980 (age 46)
- Place of birth: Luján de Cuyo, Argentina
- Height: 1.85 m (6 ft 1 in)
- Position: Midfielder

Team information
- Current team: Godoy Cruz (reserves manager)

Senior career*
Years	Team	Apps	(Gls)
1998–1999	Luján SC		
1999–2000	Independiente	0	(0)
2000–2004	Chacarita Juniors	51	(2)
2006–2008	Luján de Cuyo	36	(0)
2008–2009	Argentino de Mendoza	16	(1)
2009–2011	Luján de Cuyo		
2011–2013	Luján SC		

Managerial career
- 2018–2023: Godoy Cruz (youth)
- 2023–2024: Godoy Cruz (reserves)
- 2024: Godoy Cruz (interim)
- 2025: Godoy Cruz
- 2025–: Godoy Cruz (reserves)
- * Club domestic league appearances and goals

Ernesto Ceferino Pedernera (born 9 January 1980) is an Argentine football manager and former player who played as a midfielder. He is the current manager of Godoy Cruz's reserve team.

== Playing career ==
Born in Luján de Cuyo, Mendoza, Pedernera began his career with hometown side Luján SC before signing for Independiente in 1999. After failing to make a first team breakthrough, he moved to Chacarita Juniors in the following year.

Pedernera made his Primera División debut with Chacarita only in 2001, but struggled with injuries afterwards. On 24 August 2004, he was presented at Spanish Segunda División side Terrassa, but the deal collapsed two days later, with Pedernera alleging personal problems.

In July 2005, after a year of inactivity, Pedernera went on a trial at Unión de Santa Fe, but left after a few weeks without signing a permanent deal. In 2006, he returned to his hometown and signed for Asociación Atlética Luján de Cuyo.

Pedernera played for Argentino de Mendoza in the 2008–09 Torneo Argentino B, before returning to his previous clubs Luján de Cuyo and Luján SC. He retired with the latter in 2013, aged 33.

== Managerial career ==
After retiring, Pedernera joined Godoy Cruz as a youth manager. On 7 August 2023, he was announced as manager of the reserve team.

On 20 November 2024, Pedernera was named interim manager of Godoy Cruz's first team, replacing Daniel Oldrá. On 19 December, after two wins in four matches, he was confirmed as permanent manager of the club for the upcoming season, but returned to his former role as manager of the reserve side in February 2025.
