= 2024 AFA Liga Profesional de Fútbol =

AFA Liga Profesional de Fútbol
- Season: 2024
- Dates: 10 May – 16 December 2024
- Champions: Vélez Sarsfield (11th title)
- Relegated: None
- Copa Libertadores: Vélez Sarsfield; Talleres (C); River Plate; Boca Juniors; Racing (via Copa Sudamericana); Estudiantes (LP) (via Copa de la Liga Profesional); Central Córdoba (SdE) (via Copa Argentina)
- Copa Sudamericana: Godoy Cruz; Independiente; Huracán; Unión; Lanús; Defensa y Justicia
- Matches: 378
- Goals: 769 (2.03 per match)
- Top goalscorer: Franco Jara (13 goals)
- Biggest home win: One match 5–1; Three matches 4–0
- Biggest away win: Barracas Central 0–5 Vélez Sarsfield (26 August 2024)
- Highest scoring: Racing 4–5 Estudiantes (LP) (4 December 2024)
- Longest winning run: Five teams 5 games
- Longest unbeaten run: Independiente; 13 games
- Longest winless run: Barracas Central; 13 games
- Longest losing run: Central Córdoba (SdE); 6 games

The 2024 Liga Profesional de Fútbol (officially the Torneo Betano 2024 for sponsorship reasons) was the 134th season of top-flight professional football in Argentina. The league season began on 10 May and ended on 16 December 2024.

Twenty-eight teams competed in the league: twenty-six returning from the 2023 season as well as two promoted teams from the 2023 Primera Nacional (Independiente Rivadavia and Deportivo Riestra), both teams were participating in Argentine Primera División for the first time in history from this season. River Plate were the defending champions.

On 25 May 2024, the match Godoy Cruz vs. San Lorenzo (3rd round) was suspended in the 48th minute after a fight broke out between the supporters of Godoy Cruz in the stands of the Estadio Malvinas Argentinas. The AFA Disciplinary Court decided on 6 June 2024 to resume the match and play the remaining 42 minutes on a date to be determined behind closed doors. Godoy Cruz were deducted three points and had to play two games behind closed doors. They also had to pay San Lorenzo's travel expenses and a fine. On 8 August 2024, the Court of Appeals returned the three points to Godoy Cruz and upheld the other sentences. The match was resumed on 12 October 2024.

On 15 December 2024, Vélez Sarsfield won their 11th national league championship in the final round after defeating Huracán 2–0 and, at the same time, Newell's Old Boys defeated Talleres (C) 1–3. It was their first title since the 2013 Supercopa Argentina.

As winners of the 2024 Argentine Primera División, Vélez Sarsfield earned the right to play against the winners of the 2024 Copa de la Liga Profesional in the 2024 Trofeo de Campeones de la Liga Profesional and the winners of the 2024 Copa Argentina in the 2024 Supercopa Argentina. They also automatically qualified for the 2025 Copa Libertadores group stage.

== Competition format ==
The competition was run under a single round-robin, contested by 28 teams (26 from the previous edition plus 2 promoted from Primera Nacional). The champions qualified for the 2025 Copa Libertadores as Argentina 1. The qualification for international tournaments was determined by an aggregate table of the 2024 Primera División and 2024 Copa de la Liga Profesional first stage tournaments.

In this season two teams would be relegated to the Primera Nacional. One team would be relegated based on coefficients, while the bottom team of the aggregate table would also be relegated, however, on 17 October 2024, AFA decided that no teams would be relegated due to the league's expansion to 30 teams the next season.

== Club information ==
=== Stadiums and locations ===
Locations of the 2024 Argentine Primera División teams outside Greater Buenos Aires.
Locations of the 2024 Argentine Primera División teams within Greater Buenos Aires.

Club	City	Stadium	Capacity
Argentinos Juniors	Buenos Aires	Diego Armando Maradona	24,380
Atlético Tucumán	Tucumán	Monumental José Fierro	32,700
Banfield	Banfield	Florencio Sola	37,245
Barracas Central	Buenos Aires	Claudio "Chiqui" Tapia	2,700
Belgrano	Córdoba	Julio César Villagra	28,000
Boca Juniors	Buenos Aires	La Bombonera	57,446
Central Córdoba (SdE)	Santiago del Estero	Único Madre de Ciudades	30,000
Central Córdoba (SdE)	Santiago del Estero	Alfredo Terrera	16,000
Defensa y Justicia	Florencio Varela	Norberto "Tito" Tomaghello	8,000
Deportivo Riestra	Buenos Aires	Guillermo Laza	3,000
Estudiantes (LP)	La Plata	Jorge Luis Hirschi	30,018
Gimnasia y Esgrima (LP)	La Plata	Juan Carmelo Zerillo	24,500
Godoy Cruz	Godoy Cruz	Feliciano Gambarte	14,000
Godoy Cruz	Godoy Cruz	Malvinas Argentinas	42,000
Huracán	Buenos Aires	Tomás Adolfo Ducó	48,314
Independiente	Avellaneda	Libertadores de América	44,000
Independiente Rivadavia	Mendoza	Bautista Gargantini	25,000
Instituto	Córdoba	Juan Domingo Perón	35,535
Lanús	Lanús	Ciudad de Lanús - Néstor Díaz Pérez	46,619
Newell's Old Boys	Rosario	Marcelo Bielsa	40,000
Platense	Florida Este	Ciudad de Vicente López	31,000
Racing	Avellaneda	El Cilindro	53,389
River Plate	Buenos Aires	Mâs Monumental	84,567
Rosario Central	Rosario	Gigante de Arroyito	41,654
San Lorenzo	Buenos Aires	Pedro Bidegain	47,964
Sarmiento (J)	Junín	Eva Perón	22,000
Talleres (C)	Córdoba	Mario Alberto Kempes	54,388
Tigre	Victoria	José Dellagiovanna	26,282
Unión	Santa Fe	15 de Abril	25,000
Vélez Sarsfield	Buenos Aires	José Amalfitani	49,540

=== Personnel and sponsoring ===
Club	Manager	Kit manufacturer	Shirt sponsors (front)	Other sponsors
Argentinos Juniors	(Argentina) Norberto Batista (caretaker)	Umbro	Rapicuotas	List: Front: BichoStore Tienda Online; Back: Angiocor, Lindo Campo, Vitta; Sleeves: Gráfica Led, DataCloud; Shorts: Angiocor, Pinturerías Megapint; Socks: None; Number: None
Atlético Tucumán	(Argentina) Facundo Sava	Umbro	Caja Popular de Ahorros	List: Front: Sporting; Back: Rapicuotas, Flecha Bus; Sleeves: Casino Parque; Shorts: Sporting, Seguridad OMEGA; Socks: None; Number: None
Banfield	(Uruguay) Miguel Hernández (caretaker)	Athix	Sur Finanzas	List: Front: Empanadas Morita; Back: Flecha Bus; Sleeves: Lomas de Zamora Partido, Sur Finanzas; Shorts: Up Seguridad; Socks: None; Number: None
Barracas Central	(Argentina) Rubén Darío Insúa	Il Ossso Sports	Sur Finanzas	List: Front: None; Back: Turbodisel; Sleeves: Passline, Gentech Suplementos Deportivos; Shorts: Horcrisa, Fusion Tex Revestimientos, Secco; Socks: None; Number: None
Belgrano	(Argentina) Norberto Fernández (caretaker)	Umbro	Banco Macro	List: Front: Sanos Salud; Back: Pauny, Alcance Capitalización y Ahorro, Playcet; Sleeves: Experto Construcción Inteligente; Shorts: Riiing; Socks: None; Number: Rio Uruguay Seguros
Boca Juniors	(Argentina) Fernando Gago	Adidas	Betsson	List: Front: None; Back: DirecTV; Sleeves: None; Shorts: Pax Assistance; Socks: None; Number: None
Central Córdoba (SdE)	(Argentina) Omar De Felippe	Adhoc	Banco Santiago del Estero	List: Front: Santiago del Estero, Santiago del Estero Ciudad; Back: Tarjeta Sol; Sleeves: None; Shorts: None; Socks: None; Number: None
Defensa y Justicia	(Argentina) Pablo De Muner	KDY	Rapicuotas	List: Front: GLC tec; Back: Viviendas Roca, Volkswagen Autotag; Sleeves: Pago 24; Shorts: None; Socks: None; Number: Rio Uruguay Seguros
Deportivo Riestra	(Argentina) Cristian Fabbiani	Adidas	Speed Unlimited	List: Front: None; Back: Speed Unlimited; Sleeves: None; Shorts: Speed Unlimited; Socks: None; Number: None
Estudiantes (LP)	(Argentina) Eduardo Domínguez	RUGE	Saint-Gobain	List: Front: None; Back: Mateu Sports, Mejor Crédito; Sleeves: Bricks M2V; Shorts: None; Socks: None; Number: None
Gimnasia y Esgrima (LP)	(Uruguay) Marcelo Méndez	Givova	Rapicuotas	List: Front: None; Back: Plusmar; Sleeves: Casablanca Pinturas; Shorts: Tamburini Amoblamientos; Socks: None; Number: Rio Uruguay Seguros
Godoy Cruz	(Argentina) Ernesto Pedernera (caretaker)	Fiume Sport	CATA Internacional	List: Front: None; Back: Mendoza; Sleeves: Godoy Cruz, Ciudadano News; Shorts: Pinturas Wall, Zummy, Molico; Socks: None; Number: None
Huracán	(Argentina) Frank Kudelka	Kappa		List: Front: None; Back: Casablanca Pinturas, Leiva Joyas; Sleeves: Flecha Bus; Shorts: Laboratorio IMAT; Socks: None; Number: Rio Uruguay Seguros
Independiente	(Argentina) Julio Vaccari	Puma	Jeluz	List: Front: Rapicuotas; Back: Kanji, Pardo Hogar; Sleeves: Scienza Argentina; Shorts: BiBank; Socks: None; Number: Multiled, Rio Uruguay Seguros
Independiente Rivadavia	(Argentina) Alfredo Berti	Sport Lyon	Banco Macro	List: Front: None; Back: Edelcos; Sleeves: Diario UNO Mendoza; Shorts: ChangoMâs; Socks: None; Number: None
Instituto	(Argentina) Daniel Jiménez and (Argentina) Bruno Martelotto (caretakers)	Givova	Banco Macro	List: Front: None; Back: Brava Motos, Tecnored Latam; Sleeves: GS BIO, Nueva Chevallier; Shorts: GEA Cobertura de Salud; Socks: None; Number: None
Lanús	(Argentina) Ricardo Zielinski	Erreà	Mapei	List: Front: None; Back: Mapei, Waterplast; Sleeves: Befol; Shorts: Nueva Chevallier, Pinturas Andina; Socks: None; Number: None
Newell's Old Boys	(Argentina) Mariano Soso	AIFIT	City Center Online	List: Front: Acril SRL; Back: Hospital Italiano Rosario, Multiled; Sleeves: None; Shorts: Crucijuegos, Italmédica, Condo Del Bosque; Socks: None; Number: Rio Uruguay Seguros
Platense	(Argentina) Favio Orsi and (Argentina) Sergio Gómez	Hummel	Planes ESCO	List: Front: Transfarmaco, Empanadas Morita; Back: Civile Propiedades, Enova Store, Papelera Mas Pack; Sleeves: Urquiza Motos; Shorts: Pinturas Andina, Emergencias Salud, Olegario Restaurant & Parrilla; Socks: None; Number: None
Racing	(Argentina) Gustavo Costas	Kappa	RCA	List: Front: None; Back: Betsson, Sur Finanzas; Sleeves: Rio Uruguay Seguros; Shorts: None; Socks: None; Number: EA Sports FC
River Plate	(Argentina) Marcelo Gallardo	Adidas	Codere	List: Front: None; Back: DirecTV; Sleeves: Assist Card; Shorts: None; Socks: None; Number: None
Rosario Central	(Argentina) Ariel Holan	Umbro	City Center Online	List: Front: None; Back: Acril SRL; Sleeves: Voss2000; Shorts: Kanji; Socks: None; Number: Rio Uruguay Seguros
San Lorenzo	(Argentina) Miguel Ángel Russo	Nike	Brubank	List: Front: None; Back: Intermac Assistance, Flecha Bus; Sleeves: None; Shorts: Kanji; Socks: None; Number: None
Sarmiento (J)	(Argentina) Javier Sanguinetti	Coach	Naldo Digital	List: Front: Clínica La Pequeña Familia, FMC Argentina; Back: Laboratorio Quimeco, Alra sur Volkswagen, Aceros Perkusic; Sleeves: Sigma Agro; Shorts: Voy con Energía, Dinatech, Sistemas Junín, FD Agro, Nuseed, AGseed, Stoller; Socks: None; Number: None
Talleres (C)	(Uruguay) Alexander Medina	Le Coq Sportif	ICBC Argentina	List: Front: Holcim, Advanta; Back: None; Sleeves: Terrawind; Shorts: La Lácteo; Socks: None; Number: None
Tigre	(Argentina) Sebastián Domínguez	Kappa	Banco Macro	List: Front: None; Back: Banco Macro; Sleeves: Yomel Argentina; Shorts: Pinturas Andina; Socks: None; Number: None
Unión	(Argentina) Kily González	KDY	OSPAT	List: Front: Servicios Viales, Red Mutual; Back: Flecha Bus, Gigared; Sleeves: AutoGaba Concesionaria, Transporte Pedrito; Shorts: Flecha Bus, Sanatorio Santa Fe, Multiled, Vino Tinto Toro, Duracril, El Litoral; Socks: Vidalac; Number: Sanatorio Santa Fe
Vélez Sarsfield	(Bolivia) Gustavo Quinteros	Diadora	Saphirus	List: Front: None; Back: Banco Supervielle; Sleeves: Yerba Salam; Shorts: Turbodisel; Socks: None; Number: Rio Uruguay Seguros

=== Managerial changes ===
Team	Outgoing manager	Manner of departure	Date of vacancy	Position in table	Replaced by	Date of appointment
Independiente Rivadavia	(Argentina) Alfredo Berti	End of contract	16 November 2023	Pre-season	(Argentina) Rodolfo de Paoli	24 November 2023
Boca Juniors	(Argentina) Mariano Herrón	End of caretaker spell	26 November 2023	Pre-season	(Argentina) Diego Martínez	29 December 2023
Talleres (C)	(Argentina) Javier Gandolfi	End of contract	27 November 2023	Pre-season	(Argentina) Walter Ribonetto	20 December 2023
Newell's Old Boys	(Argentina) Gabriel Heinze	End of contract	27 November 2023	Pre-season	(Uruguay) Mauricio Larriera	29 November 2023
Sarmiento (J)	(Argentina) Facundo Sava	Resigned	28 November 2023	Pre-season	(Argentina) Sergio Rondina	12 December 2023
Barracas Central	(Argentina) Sergio Rondina	End of contract	6 December 2023	Pre-season	(Uruguay) Alejandro Orfila	13 December 2023
Racing	(Argentina) Sebastián Grazzini and (Argentina) Ezequiel Videla	End of caretaker spell	6 December 2023	Pre-season	(Argentina) Gustavo Costas	15 December 2023
Huracán	(Argentina) Diego Martínez	Resigned	7 December 2023	Pre-season	(Argentina) Facundo Sava	30 December 2023
Vélez Sarsfield	(Argentina) Sebastián Méndez	Resigned	8 December 2023	Pre-season	(Bolivia) Gustavo Quinteros	23 December 2023
Tigre	(Argentina) Lucas Pusineri	Sacked	18 December 2023	Pre-season	(Argentina) Néstor Gorosito	28 December 2023
Platense	(Argentina) Martín Palermo	End of contract	18 December 2023	Pre-season	(Argentina) Sebastián Grazzini	28 December 2023
Central Córdoba (SdE)	(Argentina) Omar De Felippe	Mutual agreement	22 December 2023	Pre-season	(Argentina) Abel Balbo	22 December 2023
Copa de la Liga Profesional changes
Deportivo Riestra	(Argentina) Matías Módolo	Sacked	7 February 2024	12th Zone A	(Argentina) Cristian Fabbiani	7 February 2024
Huracán	(Argentina) Facundo Sava	Resigned	18 February 2024	11th Zone A	(Argentina) Frank Kudelka ^{1}	5 March 2024
Atlético Tucumán	(Argentina) Favio Orsi and (Argentina) Sergio Gómez	Resigned	19 February 2024	14th Zone A	(Argentina) Facundo Sava ^{2}	3 March 2024
Sarmiento (J)	(Argentina) Sergio Rondina	Resigned	20 February 2024	13th Zone B	(Argentina) Israel Damonte ^{3}	25 February 2024
Independiente Rivadavia	(Argentina) Rodolfo de Paoli	Resigned	24 February 2024	10th Zone A	(Argentina) Martín Cicotello ^{4}	1 March 2024
Platense	(Argentina) Sebastián Grazzini	Mutual agreement	27 February 2024	11th Zone B	(Argentina) Favio Orsi and (Argentina) Sergio Gómez	29 February 2024
Belgrano	(Argentina) Guillermo Farré	Resigned	13 March 2024	13th Zone B	(Argentina) Juan Cruz Real ^{5}	22 March 2024
Tigre	(Argentina) Néstor Gorosito	Mutual agreement	19 March 2024	14th Zone B	(Argentina) Sebastián Domínguez ^{6}	5 April 2024
Central Córdoba (SdE)	(Argentina) Abel Balbo	Mutual agreement	7 April 2024	12th Zone B	(Argentina) Juan Carlos Roldán ^{7}	9 April 2024
San Lorenzo	(Argentina) Rubén Darío Insúa	Sacked	11 April 2024	9th Zone B	(Argentina) Leandro Romagnoli ^{8}	12 April 2024
Inter-tournament changes
Gimnasia y Esgrima (LP)	(Argentina) Leonardo Madelón	Mutual agreement	14 April 2024	N/A	(Uruguay) Marcelo Méndez	19 April 2024
Central Córdoba (SdE)	(Argentina) Juan Carlos Roldán	End of caretaker spell	14 April 2024	N/A	(Colombia) Lucas González	19 April 2024
Liga Profesional changes
Defensa y Justicia	(Argentina) Julio Vaccari	Resigned	14 May 2024	23rd	(Argentina) Francisco Meneghini ^{9}	27 May 2024
Independiente	(Argentina) Carlos Tevez	Resigned	19 May 2024	20th	(Argentina) Julio Vaccari ^{10}	13 June 2024
Newell's Old Boys	(Uruguay) Mauricio Larriera	Sacked	5 June 2024	11th	(Argentina) Sebastián Méndez ^{11}	19 June 2024
Banfield	(Argentina) Julio César Falcioni	Mutual agreement	14 June 2024	22nd	(Uruguay) Gustavo Munúa	22 June 2024
River Plate	(Argentina) Martín Demichelis	Mutual agreement	28 July 2024	7th	(Argentina) Marcelo Gallardo ^{12}	5 August 2024
Central Córdoba (SdE)	(Colombia) Lucas González	Sacked	29 July 2024	28th	(Argentina) Omar De Felippe	31 July 2024
Rosario Central	(Argentina) Miguel Ángel Russo	Resigned	2 August 2024	19th	(Argentina) Matías Lequi ^{8}	3 August 2024
Argentinos Juniors	(Argentina) Pablo Guede	Mutual agreement	20 August 2024	20th	(Argentina) Cristian Zermatten ^{13}	21 August 2024
Independiente Rivadavia	(Argentina) Martín Cicotello	Resigned	25 August 2024	17th	(Argentina) Alfredo Berti	26 August 2024
Defensa y Justicia	(Argentina) Francisco Meneghini	Resigned	26 August 2024	27th	(Argentina) Pablo De Muner	27 August 2024
Talleres (C)	(Argentina) Walter Ribonetto	Mutual agreement	26 August 2024	7th	(Uruguay) Alexander Medina ^{14}	1 September 2024
Barracas Central	(Uruguay) Alejandro Orfila	Resigned	27 August 2024	27th	(Argentina) Rubén Darío Insúa ^{15}	2 September 2024
Newell's Old Boys	(Argentina) Sebastián Méndez	Resigned	15 September 2024	24th	(Argentina) Ricardo Lunari ^{16}	16 September 2024
Boca Juniors	(Argentina) Diego Martínez	Resigned	28 September 2024	12th	(Argentina) Fernando Gago ^{17}	14 October 2024
San Lorenzo	(Argentina) Leandro Romagnoli	Resigned	13 October 2024	24th	(Argentina) Miguel Ángel Russo	17 October 2024
Sarmiento (J)	(Argentina) Israel Damonte	Sacked	19 October 2024	23rd	(Argentina) Javier Sanguinetti ^{18}	12 November 2024
Rosario Central	(Argentina) Matías Lequi	Mutual agreement	9 November 2024	20th	(Argentina) Ariel Holan	11 November 2024
Newell's Old Boys	(Argentina) Ricardo Lunari	End of caretaker spell	9 November 2024	27th	(Argentina) Mariano Soso ^{19}	27 November 2024
Banfield	(Uruguay) Gustavo Munúa	Mutual agreement	13 November 2024	25th	(Uruguay) Miguel Hernández ^{20}	14 November 2024
Instituto	(Argentina) Diego Dabove	Resigned	14 November 2024	14th	(Argentina) Daniel Jiménez and (Argentina) Bruno Martelotto ^{20}	15 November 2024
Godoy Cruz	(Argentina) Daniel Oldrá	Resigned	18 November 2024	17th	(Argentina) Ernesto Pedernera ^{21}	19 November 2024
Argentinos Juniors	(Argentina) Cristian Zermatten	End of caretaker spell	22 November 2024	23rd	(Argentina) Norberto Batista ^{20}	23 November 2024
Belgrano	(Argentina) Juan Cruz Real	Mutual agreement	26 November 2024	15th	(Argentina) Norberto Fernández ^{20}	27 November 2024

Interim managers

1. (Argentina) Walter Coyette was interim manager in the 2024 Copa de la Liga Profesional Group stage 7th–9th rounds.
2. (Argentina) Diego Barrado was interim manager in the 2024 Copa de la Liga Profesional Group stage 7th–8th rounds.
3. (Argentina) Martín Funes was interim manager in the 2024 Copa de la Liga Profesional Group stage 7th round.
4. (Argentina) Federico Arias was interim manager in the 2024 Copa de la Liga Profesional Group stage 8th round.
5. (Argentina) Norberto Fernández was interim manager in the 2024 Copa de la Liga Profesional Group stage 11th round.
6. (Argentina) Juan Carlos Blengio was interim manager in the 2024 Copa de la Liga Profesional Group stage 12th round.
7. Interim manager until the end of the Copa de la Liga Profesional.
8. Interim manager, but later promoted to manager.
9. (Argentina) Pablo Quatrocchi was interim manager in the 2nd–3rd rounds.
10. (Argentina) Hugo Tocalli was interim manager in the 3rd–5th rounds.
11. (Argentina) Adrián Coria was interim manager in the 5th round.
12. (Argentina) Marcelo Escudero was interim manager in the 9th round.
13. (Argentina) Cristian Zermatten was interim manager in the 12th–23rd rounds.
14. (Argentina) Mariano Levisman was interim manager in the 13th round.
15. (Argentina) Fernando Berón was interim manager in the 13th round.
16. (Argentina) Ricardo Lunari was interim manager in the 15th–22nd rounds.
17. (Argentina) Mariano Herrón was interim manager in the 17th round.
18. (Argentina) Martín Funes was interim manager in the 19th–22nd rounds.
19. (Argentina) Gabriel del Valle Medina was interim manager in the 23rd–24th rounds.
20. Interim manager until the end of the Liga Profesional.
21. Interim manager until the end of the Liga Profesional. Pedernera was promoted to manager after the end of the tournament.

=== Foreign players ===
Club	Player 1	Player 2	Player 3	Player 4	Player 5	Player 6
Argentinos Juniors	(Uruguay) Joaquín Ardaiz	(Uruguay) Alan Rodríguez				
Atlético Tucumán	(Uruguay) Matías de los Santos	(Uruguay) Juan González	(Uruguay) Franco Nicola			
Banfield	(Uruguay) Mathías De Ritis	(Colombia) Nicolás Hernández	(Paraguay) Cristian Núñez	(Uruguay) Yonatan Rodríguez		
Barracas Central	(Uruguay) Jhonatan Candia	(Colombia) Carlos Sánchez				
Belgrano	(Paraguay) Juan Espínola	(Chile) Matías Marín	(Peru) Bryan Reyna			
Boca Juniors	(Peru) Luis Advíncula	(Uruguay) Edinson Cavani	(Chile) Gary Medel	(Uruguay) Miguel Merentiel	(Uruguay) Marcelo Saracchi	
Central Córdoba (SdE)	(Uruguay) Federico Andueza	(Colombia) Luis Angulo	(Paraguay) José Florentín	(Uruguay) Nicolás Quagliata	(Uruguay) Yonatthan Rak	(Colombia) Luis Sánchez
Defensa y Justicia	(Paraguay) Rodrigo Bogarín	(Paraguay) Darío Cáceres	(Uruguay) Lucas Ferreira	(Uruguay) Cristopher Fiermarin	(Chile) César Pérez	
Deportivo Riestra	(Uruguay) Maximiliano Brito	(Colombia) Yeison Murillo	(Paraguay) Walter Rodríguez			
Estudiantes (LP)	(Chile) Javier Altamirano	(Uruguay) Sebastián Boselli	(Colombia) Edwuin Cetré	(Colombia) Alexis Manyoma	(Uruguay) Mauro Méndez	(Uruguay) Gabriel Neves
Gimnasia y Esgrima (LP)	(Uruguay) Matías Abaldo	(Uruguay) Martín Fernández	(Uruguay) Enzo Martínez	(Uruguay) Juan Pintado	(Uruguay) Valentín Rodríguez	
Godoy Cruz	(Uruguay) Nicolás Fernández	(Colombia) Juan José Pérez	(Uruguay) Vicente Poggi	(Uruguay) Salomón Rodríguez		
Huracán	(Chile) Williams Alarcón	(Chile) Rodrigo Echeverría	(Paraguay) Marcelo Pérez	(Uruguay) Pablo Siles		
Independiente	(Paraguay) Gabriel Ávalos	(Uruguay) Baltasar Barcia	(Chile) Felipe Loyola	(Ecuador) Jhonny Quiñónez	(Uruguay) Diego Segovia	
Independiente Rivadavia	(Paraguay) Fernando Romero	(Paraguay) Jorge Sanguina	(Paraguay) Fredy Vera	(Colombia) Sebastián Villa	(Paraguay) Iván Villalba	
Instituto	(Paraguay) Juan José Franco					
Lanús	(Uruguay) Luciano Boggio	(Colombia) Raúl Loaiza	(Uruguay) Gonzalo Pérez			
Newell's Old Boys	(Paraguay) Fernando Cardozo	(Uruguay) Rodrigo Fernández	(Uruguay) Ignacio Ramírez	(Paraguay) Saúl Salcedo	(Paraguay) Gustavo Velázquez	
Platense	(Peru) Juan Pablo Goicochea	(Paraguay) Ronaldo Martínez	(Uruguay) Agustín Ocampo			
Racing	(Uruguay) Martín Barrios	(Colombia) Johan Carbonero	(Colombia) Roger Martínez	(Uruguay) Gastón Martirena	(Colombia) Juan Fernando Quintero	
River Plate	(Paraguay) Adam Bareiro	(Colombia) Miguel Borja	(Uruguay) Nicolás Fonseca	(Uruguay) Agustín Sant'Anna		
Rosario Central	(Colombia) Jaminton Campaz	(Uruguay) Facundo Mallo	(Paraguay) Alan Rodríguez			
San Lorenzo	(Paraguay) Orlando Gill	(Spain) Iker Muniain	(Colombia) Jhohan Romaña			
Sarmiento (J)	(Ecuador) Bryan Cabezas	(Chile) Iván Morales				
Talleres (C)	(Colombia) Kevin Mantilla	(Venezuela) Miguel Navarro	(Colombia) Juan Portilla	(Paraguay) Blas Riveros		
Tigre	(Uruguay) Ramón Arias	(Paraguay) Blas Armoa	(Paraguay) Romeo Benítez	(Colombia) Dayro Peña	(Venezuela) Eric Ramírez	
Unión	(Uruguay) Adrián Balboa	(Uruguay) Thiago Cardozo				
Vélez Sarsfield	(Uruguay) Rodrigo Piñeiro	(Uruguay) Randall Rodríguez	(Uruguay) Michael Santos			

==== Players holding Argentinian dual nationality ====
They did not take up a foreign slot.

- (Paraguay) Juan José Cardozo (Argentinos Juniors)
- (Paraguay) Ariel Gamarra (Argentinos Juniors)
- (Ecuador) Damián Díaz (Banfield)
- (Syria) Facundo Mater (Barracas Central)
- (Colombia) Frank Fabra (Boca Juniors)
- (Uruguay) Ignacio Rodríguez (Boca Juniors)
- (Uruguay) Antony Alonso (Deportivo Riestra)
- (Paraguay) Santiago Arzamendia (Estudiantes (LP))
- (Uruguay) Tiago Palacios (Estudiantes (LP))
- (Brazil) Benjamín Sagüés Barreiro (Estudiantes (LP))
- (Armenia) Norberto Briasco (Gimnasia y Esgrima (LP))
- (Ecuador) Hernán Galíndez (Huracán)
- (United States) Alan Soñora (Huracán)
- (Syria) Ezequiel Ham (Independiente Rivadavia)
- (Ecuador) Matías Klimowicz (Instituto)
- (Paraguay) Juan José Cáceres (Lanús)
- (Uruguay) Armando Méndez (Newell's Old Boys)
- (United States) Matko Miljevic (Newell's Old Boys)
- (Syria) Tobías Cervera (Platense)
- (Chile) Gabriel Arias (Racing)
- (Chile) Paulo Díaz (River Plate)
- (Mexico) Luca Martínez (Rosario Central)
- (Italy) Agustín Módica (Rosario Central)
- (Paraguay) Agustín Sández (Rosario Central)
- (Paraguay) Iván Leguizamón (San Lorenzo)
- (Slovenia) Andrés Vombergar (San Lorenzo)
- (Chile) Bruno Barticciotto (Talleres (C))
- (Chile) Matías Catalán (Talleres (C))
- (Paraguay) Matías Galarza (Talleres (C))
- (Chile) Ulises Ortegoza (Talleres (C))
- (Syria) Jalil Elías (Vélez Sarsfield)

Source: AFA

== League table ==
Pos	Team	Pld	W	D	L	GF	GA	GD	Pts	Qualification
1	Vélez Sarsfield (C)	27	14	9	4	38	16	+22	51	Qualification for Copa Libertadores group stage
2	Talleres (C)	27	13	9	5	34	27	+7	48	
3	Racing	27	14	4	9	42	30	+12	46	
4	Huracán	27	12	10	5	28	18	+10	46	
5	River Plate	27	11	10	6	38	21	+17	43	
6	Boca Juniors	27	11	9	7	30	23	+7	42	
7	Independiente	27	9	13	5	25	17	+8	40	
8	Atlético Tucumán	27	11	7	9	28	27	+1	40	
9	Unión	27	11	7	9	27	26	+1	40	
10	Platense	27	10	9	8	20	18	+2	39	
11	Independiente Rivadavia	27	10	8	9	23	25	−2	38	
12	Estudiantes (LP)	27	8	12	7	36	34	+2	36	
13	Instituto	27	10	6	11	32	31	+1	36	
14	Lanús	27	8	12	7	28	31	−3	36	
15	Godoy Cruz	27	8	11	8	31	28	+3	35	
16	Belgrano	27	8	11	8	33	32	+1	35	
17	Deportivo Riestra	27	8	11	8	26	27	−1	35	
18	Tigre	27	8	10	9	27	30	−3	34	
19	Gimnasia y Esgrima (LP)	27	8	8	11	21	23	−2	32	
20	Rosario Central	27	8	8	11	27	30	−3	32	
21	Defensa y Justicia	27	7	11	9	27	33	−6	32	
22	Central Córdoba (SdE)	27	8	7	12	29	36	−7	31	
23	Argentinos Juniors	27	8	6	13	22	28	−6	30	
24	San Lorenzo	27	7	8	12	20	26	−6	29	
25	Newell's Old Boys	27	7	7	13	22	35	−13	28	
26	Sarmiento (J)	27	5	11	11	18	28	−10	26	
27	Banfield	27	5	9	13	22	36	−14	24	
28	Barracas Central	27	4	11	12	15	33	−18	23	

Source: AFA
Rules for classification: 1) points; 2) goal difference; 3) goals scored; 4) head-to-head results; 5) fair play ranking 6) drawing of lots.
(C) Champions

== Results ==
Teams played every other team once (either at home or away) completing a total of 27 rounds.

Home \ Away	ARG	ATU	BAN	BAR	BEL	BOC	CCO	DYJ	DRI	EST	GLP	GOD	HUR	IND	IRI	INS	LAN	NOB	PLA	RAC	RIV	ROS	SLO	SAR	TAL	TIG	UNI	VEL
Argentinos Juniors		0–0	1–0	0–1			2–1						0–0				2–0	3–0			1–0	3–2	1–0	0–0	3–0	0–2		1–1
Atlético Tucumán					2–4	1–0	2–0	1–1		2–0			4–2		2–1	1–0	1–0	0–0	1–1	1–0				1–0		1–2		
Banfield		1–1			1–1					1–2			1–1		2–0	1–2	0–1	2–0		2–1				1–1	1–1	0–1		2–2
Barracas Central		0–2	0–1		1–1					1–1			0–2		1–1		3–3	0–1		0–2				1–1	1–1	0–0		0–5
Belgrano	1–0					2–0	2–1	1–2	2–1	2–2	0–1	1–0		1–1	0–2	3–1			0–1	4–4							1–1	
Boca Juniors	1–0		3–0	1–1					1–1		1–0	4–1		0–0							0–1	2–1	3–2		0–0		1–0	1–0
Central Córdoba (SdE)			0–0	2–1		2–4		2–0		1–1					2–0	2–1			0–2	3–1		0–1	0–1		2–4			0–2
Defensa y Justicia	2–1		1–0	1–0		2–2			1–1		1–1	2–1		0–0					1–3		0–0	2–1	0–0				0–0	
Deportivo Riestra	2–0	2–0	1–1	0–0			1–0						1–0				3–1	3–3			2–0	0–2	1–0	2–1	0–0			1–1
Estudiantes (LP)	2–2					1–1		1–0	2–0		4–1	1–1		0–2	1–1	3–2			1–1		1–2	1–1					0–0	
Gimnasia y Esgrima (LP)	1–0	1–0	3–0	2–1			0–0		0–0			0–1						1–0			1–1	0–1	0–1		0–1		2–3	3–1
Godoy Cruz	1–0	1–1	4–0	0–1			1–1		4–1				1–1					2–0			2–1	1–1	1–1	1–1	0–1			0–0
Huracán					1–0	0–0	0–0	3–1		0–0	0–0			1–0	1–0	1–0	3–0		1–0	0–0				3–1		0–2		
Independiente	0–0	2–1	2–1	0–0			2–0		3–1		1–0	1–1									0–0	1–0	0–0		1–3		3–0	1–1
Independiente Rivadavia	2–1					1–1		1–0	0–0		1–0	0–0		1–0		1–1			0–2		2–1	1–1	1–0				0–1	
Instituto	1–0			0–1		0–0		4–1	2–1		2–1	1–3		3–1					2–0		2–3	0–0	2–0				1–1	
Lanús					3–2	1–0	1–1	0–0		2–1	0–0	1–1		0–2	0–2	2–0			0–0	2–0						3–2	1–1	
Newell's Old Boys					0–0	0–1	2–3	1–0		1–4			2–4	2–1	0–0	0–2	2–1		2–0	0–1				1–1		1–0		
Platense	2–1		0–1	0–0		1–0			0–0		1–0	1–0		0–0							0–0	1–0	1–2				1–0	0–2
Racing	3–0					2–1		4–3	1–0	4–5	0–1	3–0		0–0	2–1	2–0			1–1		1–0						2–1	
River Plate		4–1	3–1	3–0	3–0		3–0						1–1				2–2	0–0				4–0	1–1	1–0	0–1	3–1		1–1
Rosario Central		1–0	1–1	0–1	2–1								0–1				1–1	1–0		0–2			0–1	4–2	2–2	1–1		3–0
San Lorenzo		0–1	2–1	1–0	0–2					1–1			1–1				1–1	1–1		1–2				0–1	2–0	0–1		0–1
Sarmiento (J)					0–0	0–2	1–3	1–1		2–0	1–1			0–0	0–1	1–2	0–0		1–0	1–0						0–0	1–0	
Talleres (C)		2–0			0–0			1–1		1–0			1–0		2–1	1–1	1–2	1–3	2–1	2–0				2–0		1–1		
Tigre					1–1	3–0	1–1	0–4	2–1	0–1	1–1	0–2		1–1	0–2	0–0			0–0	0–4							5–1	
Unión	3–0	1–0	1–0	2–0			0–2		0–0			3–1	0–1					2–0			0–0	1–0	2–1		2–3			1–0
Vélez Sarsfield		1–1			1–1			3–0		2–0			2–0		4–0	1–0	0–0	1–0		1–0				1–0	3–0	1–0		

Source: AFA
Legend: Blue = home team win; Yellow = draw; Red = away team win.

== Season statistics ==
=== Top goalscorers ===
Rank	Player	Club	Goals
1	(Argentina) Franco Jara	Belgrano	13
2	(Argentina) Braian Romero	Vélez Sarsfield	12
3	(Colombia) Miguel Borja	River Plate	11
4	(Argentina) Milton Giménez	Banfield/Boca Juniors	10
4	(Argentina) Mateo Pellegrino	Platense	10
6	(Argentina) Jonathan Herrera	Deportivo Riestra	9
6	(Paraguay) Gabriel Ávalos	Independiente	9
6	(Argentina) Claudio Aquino	Vélez Sarsfield	9
9	(Uruguay) Salomón Rodríguez	Godoy Cruz	8
10	(Uruguay) Miguel Merentiel	Boca Juniors	7
10	(Argentina) Guido Carrillo	Estudiantes (LP)	7
10	(Argentina) Walter Bou	Lanús	7
10	(Argentina) Adrián Martínez	Racing	7
10	(Argentina) Facundo Colidio	River Plate	7
10	(Chile) Bruno Barticciotto	Talleres (C)	7

Source: AFA

=== Top assists ===
Rank	Player	Club	Assists
1	(Argentina) Marcelino Moreno	Lanús	9
2	(Colombia) Sebastián Villa	Independiente Rivadavia	6
2	(Argentina) Gastón Lodico	Instituto	6
2	(Argentina) Thiago Fernández	Vélez Sarsfield	6
5	(Peru) Bryan Reyna	Belgrano	5
5	(Colombia) Alexis Manyoma	Estudiantes (LP)	5
5	(Uruguay) Juan Pintado	Gimnasia y Esgrima (LP)	5
5	(Uruguay) Gastón Martirena	Racing	5
5	(Argentina) Ignacio Malcorra	Rosario Central	5
5	(Argentina) Gastón Benavídez	Talleres (C)	5
5	(Argentina) Rubén Botta	Talleres (C)	5
5	(Argentina) Francisco Pizzini	Vélez Sarsfield	5

Source: AFA

== Aggregate table ==
=== International qualification ===
The 2024 Argentine Primera División champions, 2024 Copa de la Liga Profesional champions and 2024 Copa Argentina champions earned a berth to the 2025 Copa Libertadores. The remaining berths to the 2025 Copa Libertadores as well as the ones to the 2025 Copa Sudamericana were determined by an aggregate table of the 2024 Argentine Primera División and 2024 Copa de la Liga Profesional first stage tournaments. The top three teams in the aggregate table not already qualified for any international tournament qualified for the Copa Libertadores, while the next six teams qualified for the Copa Sudamericana.

=== Relegation ===
In this season, the bottom team of the aggregate table would be relegated to the 2025 Primera Nacional, but, on 17 October 2024, AFA decided that no teams would be relegated.

Pos	Team	Pld	W	D	L	GF	GA	GD	Pts	Qualification
1	Vélez Sarsfield	41	21	13	7	52	29	+23	76	Qualification for Copa Libertadores group stage (Note: Vélez Sarsfield, Racing, Estudiantes (LP) and Central Córdoba (SdE) qualified for the Copa Libertadores group stage by winning the 2024 Argentine Primera División, the 2024 Copa Sudamericana, the 2024 Copa de la Liga Profesional and the 2024 Copa Argentina, respectively.)
2	Talleres (C)	41	19	15	7	58	43	+15	72	Qualification for Copa Libertadores group stage
3	River Plate	41	18	16	7	64	31	+33	70	Qualification for Copa Libertadores group stage
4	Racing	41	21	7	13	66	41	+25	70	Qualification for Copa Libertadores group stage
5	Boca Juniors	41	18	13	10	50	35	+15	67	Qualification for Copa Libertadores second stage
6	Godoy Cruz	41	17	13	11	47	34	+13	64	Qualification for Copa Sudamericana group stage
7	Estudiantes (LP)	41	16	15	10	55	43	+12	63	Qualification for Copa Libertadores group stage
8	Independiente	41	15	18	8	39	27	+12	63	Qualification for Copa Sudamericana group stage
9	Huracán	41	16	14	11	40	30	+10	62	Qualification for Copa Sudamericana group stage
10	Unión	41	16	12	13	43	40	+3	60	Qualification for Copa Sudamericana group stage
11	Lanús	41	15	14	12	48	45	+3	59	Qualification for Copa Sudamericana group stage
12	Defensa y Justicia	41	14	16	11	44	46	−2	58	Qualification for Copa Sudamericana group stage
13	Platense	41	14	15	12	30	32	−2	57	
14	Argentinos Juniors	41	15	11	15	47	42	+5	56	
15	Instituto	41	15	8	18	50	48	+2	53	
16	Atlético Tucumán	41	12	14	15	36	50	−14	50	
17	Belgrano	41	11	16	14	52	53	−1	49	
18	Barracas Central	41	11	16	14	35	48	−13	49	
19	Newell's Old Boys	41	13	10	18	35	50	−15	49	
20	Gimnasia y Esgrima (LP)	41	13	9	19	39	46	−7	48	
21	Deportivo Riestra	41	11	15	15	34	43	−9	48	
22	Rosario Central	41	12	11	18	37	48	−11	47	
23	Independiente Rivadavia	41	12	10	19	36	50	−14	46	
24	San Lorenzo	41	10	15	16	30	40	−10	45	
25	Central Córdoba (SdE)	41	10	12	19	39	56	−17	42	Qualification for Copa Libertadores group stage
26	Banfield	41	9	14	18	36	51	−15	41	
27	Tigre	41	9	12	20	34	55	−21	39	
28	Sarmiento (J)	41	7	14	20	27	47	−20	35	

Source: AFA
Rules for classification: 1) points; 2) goal difference; 3) goals scored; 4) head-to-head results; 5) fair play ranking 6) drawing of lots.

== Relegation based on coefficients ==
In addition to the relegation based on the aggregate table, one team would be relegated at the end of the season based on coefficients, which take into consideration the points obtained by the clubs during the current season (aggregate table points) and the two previous seasons (only seasons in the top flight would be counted). The total tally would then be divided by the number of games played in the top flight over those three seasons and an average would be calculated. The team with the worst average at the end of the season would be relegated to Primera Nacional, but, on 17 October 2024, AFA decided that no teams would be relegated.

Pos	Team	2022 Pts	2023 Pts	2024 Pts	Total Pts	Total Pld	Avg
1	River Plate	76	85	70	231	123	1.878
2	Racing	80	60	70	210	123	1.707
3	Boca Juniors	79	62	67	208	123	1.691
4	Estudiantes (LP)	61	62	63	186	123	1.512
5	Talleres (C)	46	67	72	185	123	1.504
6	Defensa y Justicia	65	58	58	181	123	1.472
7	Godoy Cruz	51	63	64	178	123	1.447
8	Huracán	65	51	62	178	123	1.447
9	Argentinos Juniors	67	54	56	177	123	1.439
10	Vélez Sarsfield	46	49	76	171	123	1.39
11	San Lorenzo	58	64	45	167	123	1.358
12	Independiente	51	51	63	165	123	1.341
13	Newell's Old Boys	63	53	49	165	123	1.341
14	Atlético Tucumán	57	54	50	161	123	1.309
15	Belgrano	—	57	49	106	82	1.293
16	Gimnasia y Esgrima (LP)	65	45	48	158	123	1.285
17	Rosario Central	46	65	47	158	123	1.285
18	Instituto	—	52	53	105	82	1.28
19	Unión	49	46	60	155	123	1.26
20	Platense	42	54	57	153	123	1.244
21	Lanús	36	57	59	152	123	1.236
22	Barracas Central	53	49	49	151	123	1.228
23	Tigre	63	47	39	149	123	1.211
24	Deportivo Riestra	—	—	48	48	41	1.171
25	Banfield	49	53	41	143	123	1.163
26	Central Córdoba (SdE)	49	48	42	139	123	1.13
27	Independiente Rivadavia	—	—	46	46	41	1.122
28	Sarmiento (J)	53	46	35	134	123	1.089

Source: AFA

== Attendances ==
Pos	Team	Average attendance
1	River Plate	83,754
2	Boca Juniors	57,200
3	Talleres (C)	51,700
4	Racing	42,867
5	Newell's Old Boys	41,708
6	Vélez Sarsfield	41,646
7	Rosario Central	41,056
8	San Lorenzo	40,429
9	Independiente	37,749
10	Belgrano	36,475
11	Huracán	30,362
12	Estudiantes (LP)	30,254
13	Unión	29,741
14	Atlético Tucumán	28,714
15	Gimnasia y Esgrima (LP)	26,862
16	Independiente Rivadavia	23,488
17	Banfield	21,777
18	Instituto	20,425
19	Platense	18,694
20	Argentinos Juniors	16,331
21	Tigre	15,909
22	Defensa y Justicia	11,320
23	Lanús	9,705
24	Godoy Cruz	6,991
25	Sarmiento (J)	6,251
26	Central Córdoba (SdE)	3,073
27	Deportivo Riestra	1,543
28	Barracas Central	842

== See also ==
- 2024 Copa de la Liga Profesional
- 2024 Copa Argentina
