= Gabriel Ávalos =

Paraguayan footballer (born 1990)

- Ávalos with Paraguay in 2026

Personal information
- Full name: Gabriel Ávalos Stumpfs
- Date of birth: 9 July 1991 (age 35)
- Place of birth: Hohenau, Paraguay
- Height: 1.91 m (6 ft 3 in)
- Position: Striker

Team information
- Current team: Olimpia
- Number: 9

Youth career
- Libertad

Senior career*
Years	Team	Apps	(Gls)
2008	Tembetary		
2008–2009	Defensores de Cambaceres		
2009–2010	Tigre	0	(0)
2010–2011	Gimnasia La Plata	0	(0)
2012	Independiente FBC	10	(0)
2013	General Díaz	13	(2)
2013–2014	Deportes Concepción	23	(6)
2014–2016	Crucero del Norte	38	(10)
2016	Peñarol	5	(0)
2017–2018	Nueva Chicago	22	(6)
2018–2020	Godoy Cruz	10	(2)
2019–2020	→ Patronato (loan)	32	(7)
2020–2023	Argentinos Juniors	101	(37)
2024–2026	Independiente	94	(33)
2026–	Olimpia	5	(1)

International career^{‡}
2021–	Paraguay	27	(2)
- * Club domestic league appearances and goals as of 17:15, 4 October 2026 (UTC) ‡ National team caps and goals as of 4 July 2026

Gabriel Ávalos Stumpfs (born 9 July 1991) is a Paraguayan professional footballer who plays as a striker for Olimpia and the Paraguay national team.

== Club career ==
Born in Hohenau, Ávalos began his career with Tembetary at the age of 17. After a period with the youth categories of Libertad, he moved to Argentina with Defensores de Cambaceres in 2008.

After playing for the reserve sides of Tigre and Gimnasia La Plata, Ávalos returned to his home country in 2012 and signed for Independiente FBC in the top tier, but was rarely used. In January 2013, he moved to fellow league team General Díaz.

In August 2013, Ávalos signed for Deportes Concepción in the Primera B de Chile. Roughly one year later, he returned to Argentina with Crucero del Norte, being regularly used before suffering a knee injury in September 2015.

On 29 June 2016, Ávalos switched teams and countries again after signing a one-year deal with Peñarol in Uruguay. Rarely used, he terminated his link with the club in January 2017, and spent six months without a club before returning to Argentina with Nueva Chicago, where his career took a turn.

In July 2018, Ávalos agreed to a deal with Godoy Cruz. The following 18 January, he was loaned to Patronato, where he scored a hat-trick on his debut against River Plate late in that month.

On 30 July 2020, Ávalos signed an 18-month contract with Argentinos Juniors. On 26 December 2023, after being Argentinos Juniors' top scorer in the league campaign with 12 goals, he moved to Independiente on a three-year deal.

== International career ==
Ávalos represented the Paraguay national team in a 0–0 2022 FIFA World Cup qualification tie with Uruguay on 3 June 2021.

On 1 June 2026, he was named by head coach Gustavo Alfaro in Paraguay's 26-man squad for the 2026 FIFA World Cup.

== Career statistics ==
=== Club ===
As of match played on 21 March 2026

Club statistics
Club	Season	League			National cup		Continental		Other		Total	
Club	Season	Division	Apps	Goals	Apps	Goals	Apps	Goals	Apps	Goals	Apps	Goals
Independiente FBC	2012	APF División de Honor	10	0	—		—		—		10	0
General Díaz	2013	APF División de Honor	13	2	—		—		—		13	2
General Díaz	2013–14	Primera B de Chile	23	6	—		—		—		23	6
Crucero del Norte	2014	Primera B Nacional	17	5	0	0	—		—		17	5
Crucero del Norte	2015	Argentine Primera División	21	5	0	0	—		—		21	5
Crucero del Norte	Total		38	10	0	0	—		—		38	10
Peñarol	2016	Uruguayan Primera División	5	0	0	0	—		2 (Note: Appearances in the Copa Sudamericana)	0	7	0
Nuevo Chicago	2017–18	Primera B Nacional	22	6	0	0	—		—		22	6
Godoy Cruz	2017–18	Argentine Primera División	10	2	0	0	—		—		10	2
Patronato (loan)	2018–19	Argentine Primera División	10	4	2	1	—		—		12	5
Patronato (loan)	2019–20	Argentine Primera División	22	3	0	0	—		—		22	3
Patronato (loan)	Total		32	7	2	1	—		—		34	8
Argentinos Juniors	2020–21	Argentine Primera División	4	2	—		—		—		4	2
Argentinos Juniors	2021	Argentine Primera División	26	7	4	1	8 (Note: Appearances in the Copa Libertadores)	3	—		38	14
Argentinos Juniors	2022	Argentine Primera División	35	11	1	2	—		—		52	19
Argentinos Juniors	2023	Argentine Primera División	36	17	3	3	6	1	—		45	21
Argentinos Juniors	Total		101	37	8	6	6	1	—		115	43
Independiente	2024	Argentine Primera División	41	10	4	0	—		—		45	11
Independiente	2025	Argentine Primera División	30	12	3	0	6	0	—		39	12
Independiente	2026	Argentine Primera División	11	7	0	0	—		—		11	7
Independiente	Total		82	29	7	0	6	0	—		95	30
Career totals			336	99	17	7	12	1	2	0	367	107

=== International ===
As of match played 4 July 2026

National team	Year	Apps	Goals
Paraguay	2021	6	1
Paraguay	2022	2	0
Paraguay	2023	8	1
Paraguay	2025	4	0
Paraguay	2026	7	0
Total		27	2

Scores and results list Paraguay's goal tally first.

No.	Date	Venue	Opponent	Score	Result	Competition
1.	2 July 2021	Estádio Olímpico Pedro Ludovico, Goiânia, Brazil	Peru	3–3	3–3	2021 Copa América
2.	27 March 2023	Estadio Monumental David Arellano, Santiago, Chile	Chile	2–1	2–3	Friendly
