= Fabio Pereyra =

Argentine footballer

Personal information
- Full name: Fabio Jesús Pereyra
- Date of birth: 31 January 1990 (age 36)
- Place of birth: Federal, Argentina
- Height: 1.86 m (6 ft 1 in)
- Position: Centre-back

Team information
- Current team: Huracán
- Number: 6

Youth career
- Club Ateneo

Senior career*
Years	Team	Apps	(Gls)
2011–2014	C.A.I	66	(2)
2014	Tiro Federal	12	(1)
2015–2016	Independiente	38	(0)
2016–2018	San Jorge	38	(1)
2018–2021	Arsenal Sarandí	55	(1)
2021–2022	Melgar	20	(1)
2022–2023	Central Córdoba SdE	61	(0)
2023–	Huracán	97	(3)
- * Club domestic league appearances and goals as of 17:09, 6 July 2026 (UTC)

Fabio Jesús Pereyra (born 31 January 1990) is an Argentine professional footballer who plays as a centre-back for Argentine team Huracán.

== Career ==
Pereyra began in the ranks of Club Ateneo, before signing with CAI of Torneo Argentino A as the defender was selected in thirteen matches during the 2011–12 campaign which ended with relegation. He remained with the club for two further seasons, the latter back in Torneo Argentino A following promotion. On 30 June 2014, Pereyra completed a move to Torneo Federal A's Tiro Federal. He scored his first goal for them in his fifth appearance, netting the leveller in a 1–1 tie with Defensores de Belgrano. Fellow third tier team Independiente signed Pereyra. Like with CAI, his first season with Independiente concluded with them being relegated.

In June 2016, Pereyra returned to Torneo Federal A after agreeing to join San Jorge. He scored one goal, against Guaraní Antonio Franco on 4 October 2017, in forty-four appearances in all competitions across the 2016–17 and 2017–18 seasons. Pereyra joined Primera B Nacional side Arsenal de Sarandí ahead of 2018–19. His professional debut arrived on 25 August 2018 during a home draw with Gimnasia y Esgrima. Then near the end of January 2021, 'Paio' terminated his contract with Arsenal de Sarandí to join Peruvian side FBC Melgar.

== Personal life ==
Pereyra's brother, Javier, is also a footballer.

== Career statistics ==
As of 20 November 2018.

Club statistics
Club	Season	League			Cup (Note: Includes the Copa Argentina)		League Cup		Continental		Other		Total	
Club	Season	Division	Apps	Goals	Apps	Goals	Apps	Goals	Apps	Goals	Apps	Goals	Apps	Goals
CAI	2011–12	Torneo Argentino A	13	0	0	0	—		—		0	0	13	0
CAI	2012–13	Torneo Argentino B	25	1	1	0	—		—		0	0	26	1
CAI	2013–14	Torneo Argentino A	28	1	0	0	—		—		4 (Note: Four appearances in the 2013–14 Torneo Argentino A play-offs)	0	32	1
CAI	Total		66	2	1	0	—		—		4	0	71	2
Tiro Federal	2014	Torneo Federal A	12	1	0	0	—		—		2 (Note: Two appearances in the 2014 Torneo Federal A play-offs)	0	14	1
Independiente	2015	Torneo Federal A	26	0	0	0	—		—		0	0	26	0
Independiente	2016	Torneo Federal B	12	0	0	0	—		—		0	0	12	0
Independiente	Total		38	0	0	0	—		—		0	0	38	0
San Jorge	2016–17	Torneo Federal A	16	0	0	0	—		—		0	0	16	0
San Jorge	2017–18	Torneo Federal A	22	1	4	0	—		—		2 (Note: Two appearances in the 2017–18 Torneo Federal A play-offs)	0	28	1
San Jorge	Total		38	1	4	0	—		—		2	0	44	1
Arsenal de Sarandí	2018–19	Primera B Nacional	10	0	0	0	—		—		0	0	10	0
Career total			164	4	5	0	—		—		8	0	177	4

== Honours ==
CAI

- Torneo Argentino B: 2012–13

Arsenal Sarandí

- Primera Nacional: 2018–19
