= Walter Mazzantti =

Argentine footballer

Personal information
- Full name: Walter Uriel Mazzantti
- Date of birth: 5 September 1996 (age 30)
- Place of birth: Buenos Aires, Argentina
- Height: 1.74 m (5 ft 9 in)
- Position: Right winger

Team information
- Current team: Newell's Old Boys (on loan from Independiente)
- Number: 18

Youth career
- Tigre

Senior career*
Years	Team	Apps	(Gls)
2016–2018	Tigre	2	(0)
2017	→ Comunicaciones (loan)		
2018–2020	Atlanta	57	(4)
2020–2023	Huachipato	58	(9)
2023–2025	Huracán	86	(14)
2025–	Independiente	17	(0)
2026–	→ Newell's Old Boys (loan)	8	(1)
- * Club domestic league appearances and goals as of 17:28, 8 May 2026 (UTC)

Walter Uriel Mazzantti (born 5 September 1996) is an Argentine professional footballer who plays for Argentine Primera División club Newell's Old Boys, on loan from Independiente.
