= 2025 Club Atlético Platense season =

Club Atlético Platense
2025 season
- Chairman: Sebastián Ordóñez
- Manager: Favio Orsi and Sergio Gómez
- Stadium: Estadio Ciudad de Vicente López
- Torneo Apertura: Winner (1st title)
- Torneo Clausura: 15th
- Copa Argentina: Round of 32
- Trofeo de Campeones: Runner-up
Home colours	Away colours

The 2025 season was the 120th for Club Atlético Platense and their 5th consecutive season in the Primera División. Platense won their first ever title on 1 June 2025 after defeating Club Atlético Huracán in the Torneo Apertura final.

The club also took part in the Copa Argentina and Trofeo de Campeones de la Liga Profesional.

== Squad ==
=== Current squad ===
As of 19 March, 2025.

No.	Pos.	Nation	Player
1	GK	ARG	Andrés Desábato
2	DF	ARG	Juan Pablo Pignani
3	DF	ARG	Tomás Silva (on loan from San Lorenzo)
4	DF	URU	Edgar Elizalde (on loan from Gimnasia LP)
5	MF	ARG	Rodrigo Herrera (on loan from Defensa y Justicia)
6	DF	ARG	Oscar Salomón (captain; on loan from Boca Juniors)
7	FW	ARG	Guido Mainero
8	MF	ARG	Fernando Juárez
9	FW	CHI	Maximiliano Rodríguez (on loan from Huachipato)
11	MF	ARG	Franco Zapiola
12	DF	ARG	Jonathan Bay
13	DF	ARG	Ignacio Vázquez
14	MF	ARG	Leonel Picco
16	MF	ARG	Vicente Taborda (on loan from Boca Juniors)
18	DF	ARG	Santiago Postel
19	MF	ARG	Santiago Toloza
20	FW	ARG	Rodrigo Márquez (on loan from Independiente)

No.	Pos.	Nation	Player
21	FW	ARG	Augusto Lotti
22	DF	ARG	Raúl Lozano (on loan from Quilmes)
23	MF	ARG	Enzo Roldán (on loan from Unión Santa Fe)
24	DF	ARG	Bautista Barros Schelotto (on loan from Gimnasia La Plata)
25	DF	ARG	Juan Ignacio Saborido
26	FW	ARG	Ignacio Schor
27	GK	ARG	Federico Losas (on loan from Chacarita Juniors)
29	FW	ARG	Franco Minerva
30	FW	SYR	Tobías Cervera (on loan from Rosario Central)
31	GK	ARG	Juan Pablo Cozzani
32	MF	ARG	Franco Baldassarra
43	DF	ARG	Gonzalo Goñi
77	FW	PAR	Ronaldo Martínez
97	FW	PER	Juan Pablo Goicochea
—	FW	ARG	Nicolás Orsini (on loan from Boca Juniors)

=== Transfers In ===
Pos.	Player	Transferred from	Fee	Date	Source
GK	(Argentina) Juan Pablo Cozzani	(Argentina) Deportivo Maipú	Loan	1 January 2025	
DF	(Argentina) Gonzalo Goñi	(Argentina) Barracas Central	Free	4 February 2025	
MF	(Argentina) Mauro Luna Diale	(Russia) Akhmat Grozny	Loan	24 July 2025	

=== Transfers Out ===
Pos.	Player	Transferred to	Fee	Date	Source
GK	(Argentina) Juan Pablo Cozzani	(Saudi Arabia) Al-Kholood	Loan	19 August 2025	

== Competitions ==
=== Overall record ===
Competition	First match	Last match	Starting round	Final position	Record							
Competition	First match	Last match	Starting round	Final position	Pld	W	D	L	GF	GA	GD	Win %
Torneo Apertura	25 January 2025	1 June 2025	Matchday 1	Winner	20	9	6	5	17	12	+5	45.00
Torneo Clausura	13 July 2025	17 November 2025	Matchday 1	15th	16	2	6	8	12	25	−13	12.50
Copa Argentina	12 March 2025	2 July 2025	Round of 64	Round of 32	2	1	1	0	4	2	+2	50.00
Trofeo de Campeones	20 December 2025		Finals	Runner-up	1	0	0	1	1	2	−1	0.00
Total					39	12	13	14	34	41	−7	30.77

Source: Competitions

=== Primera División ===
==== Torneo Apertura ====
===== League table =====
Pos	Team	Pld	W	D	L	GF	GA	GD	Pts	Qualification
4	San Lorenzo	16	7	6	3	14	10	+4	27	Advance to round of 16
5	Deportivo Riestra	16	5	9	2	13	7	+6	24	Advance to round of 16
6	Platense	16	6	5	5	13	11	+2	23	Advance to round of 16
7	Lanús	16	4	8	4	13	11	+2	20	Advance to round of 16
8	Instituto	16	5	3	8	16	20	−4	18	Advance to round of 16

Source: AFA

===== Results by round =====
Round	1	2	3	4	5	6	7	8	9	10
Ground	H	A	A	H	A	H	A	H	H	A
Result	D	W	L	W	L	D	D	L	D	W
Position										

A = Away; H = Home; W = Win; D = Draw; L = Loss

===== Matches =====
25 January 2025 1	Platense	1–1	River Plate	Florida
21:30 UTC−3	Vázquez 12'	Report	Rojas 87'	Stadium: Estadio Ciudad de Vicente López; Referee: Ariel Penel

28 January 2025 2	Vélez Sarsfield	0–1	Platense	Buenos Aires
21:30 UTC−3		Report	Mainero 90+3'	Stadium: José Amalfitani Stadium

3 February 2025 3	Argentinos Juniors	1–0	Platense	Buenos Aires
21:30 UTC−3	Érik Godoy 90+2'			Stadium: Estadio Diego Armando Maradona

9 February 2025 4	Platense	1–0	Instituto	Florida
17:00 UTC−3	Lotti 56'	Report		Stadium: Estadio Ciudad de Vicente López; Referee: A

13 February 2025 5	San Lorenzo	2–1	Platense	Buenos Aires
20:00 UTC−3	Vombergar 44' (pen.), 90+1' (pen.)	Report	Taborda 31'	Stadium: Estadio Pedro Bidegain

17 February 2025 6	Platense	1–1	Independiente	Florida
19:15 UTC−3	Paredes 89' (o.g.)	Report	Vázquez 76' (o.g.)	Stadium: Estadio Ciudad de Vicente López

21 February 2025 7	Godoy Cruz	1–1	Platense	Mendoza
19:15 UTC−3	Cozzani 67' (o.g.)	Report	Taborda 38'	Stadium: Estadio Malvinas Argentinas

4 March 2025 8	Platense	0–1	Defensa y Justicia	Florida
:00 UTC−3		Report	Miranda 11'	Stadium: Estadio Ciudad de Vicente López

8 March 2025 9	Platense	0–0	Lanús	Florida
21:30 UTC−3		Report		Stadium: Estadio Ciudad de Vicente López

17 March 2025 10	San Martín de San Juan	0–2	Platense	San Juan
21:15 UTC−3		Report	Taborda 11', 31'	Stadium: Estadio Ingeniero Hilario Sánchez

28 March 2025 11	Platense	2–1	Atlético Tucumán	Florida
21:30 UTC−3	Martínez 8'; Acosta 77' (o.g.)	Report	Nicola 38'	Stadium: Estadio Ciudad de Vicente López

7 April 2025 12	Deportivo Riestra	1–0	Platense	Buenos Aires
15:30 UTC−3	Randazzo 57'	Report		Stadium: Estadio Guillermo Laza

15 April 2025 13	Platense	0–0	Rosario Central	Florida
20:00 UTC−3		Report		Stadium: Estadio Ciudad de Vicente López

20 April 2025 14	Sarmiento	0–1	Platense	Junín
18:00 UTC−3		Report	Mainero 54'	Stadium: Estadio Eva Perón

29 April 2025 15	Platense	2–1	Talleres	Florida
19:00 UTC−3	Mainero 51'; Martínez 53'	Report	Schott 22'	Stadium: Estadio Ciudad de Vicente López; Referee: Luis Lobo Medina

4 May 2025 16	Gimnasia y Esgrima	1–0	Platense	La Plata
15:30 UTC−3		Report	Garayalde 90+2'	Stadium: Estadio Juan Carmelo Zerillo

===== Final stages =====
10 May 2025 Round of 16	Racing	0–1	Platense	Avellaneda
18:45		Report	Orsini 83'	Stadium: El Cilindro; Referee: Darío Herrera

20 May 2025 Quarter-finals	River Plate	1–1 (2–4 p)	Platense	Buenos Aires
20:30	Mastantuono 90+12' (pen.)	Report	Taborda 29'	Stadium: Mâs Monumental; Referee: Yael Falcón Pérez
	Penalties
	Mastantuono (penalty scored); Borja (penalty scored); Castaño (penalty missed); Driussi (penalty missed)		(penalty scored) Vázquez; (penalty missed) Saborido; (penalty scored) Mainero; (penalty scored) Zapiola; (penalty scored) Schor

25 May 2025 Semi-finals	San Lorenzo	0–1	Platense	Buenos Aires
16:00		Report	Zapiola 71'	Stadium: Pedro Bidegain; Referee: Leandro Rey Hilfer

1 June 2025 Final	Huracán	0–1	Platense	Santiago del Estero
17:00		Report	Mainero 63'	Stadium: Estadio Único Madre de Ciudades; Referee: Facundo Tello

==== Torneo Clausura ====
===== League table =====
Pos	Team	Pld	W	D	L	GF	GA	GD	Pts
11	Independiente	16	4	6	6	14	13	+1	18
12	Atlético Tucumán	16	5	3	8	17	22	−5	18
13	Instituto	16	3	7	6	9	17	−8	16
14	Godoy Cruz	16	1	9	6	11	19	−8	12
15	Platense	16	2	6	8	12	25	−13	12

Source: AFA

===== Matches =====
13 July 2025 1	River Plate	3–1	Platense	Buenos Aires
18:00 ART (UTC−3)	Colidio 7'; Salas 39'; Borja 90+1'	Report	Martínez 24'	Stadium: Estadio Monumental

19 July 2025 2	Platense	0–0	Vélez Sarsfield	Florida
18:45 UTC−3		Report		Stadium: Estadio Ciudad de Vicente López

26 July 2025 3	Platense	0–0	Argentinos Juniors	Florida
19:00 UTC−3		Report		Stadium: Estadio Ciudad de Vicente López

10 August 2025 4	Instituto	1–1	Platense	Córdoba
17:00 UTC−3	Puebla 18'	Report	Martínez 90+5'	Stadium: Estadio Monumental Presidente Perón

16 August 2025 5	Platense	2–1	San Lorenzo	Florida
14:15 UTC−3	Martínez 5', 45+4'	Report	Báez 26'	Stadium: Estadio Ciudad de Vicente López

=== Copa Argentina ===
12 March 2025 Round of 64	Platense	2–0	Argentino de Quilmes	Caseros
17:00 UTC−3	Lotti 46'; Taborda 80'	Report		Stadium: Ciudad de Caseros; Referee: Fernando Echenique

2 July 2025 Round of 32	Platense	2–2 (1–3 p)	Independiente Rivadavia	Rosario
21:15	Picco 44'; Mainero 77' (pen.)	Report	Villa 11' (pen.); Retamar 55'	Stadium: Marcelo Bielsa; Referee: Pablo Dóvalo
	Penalties
	Vázquez (penalty missed); Mainero (penalty missed); Schor (penalty scored); Saborido (penalty missed)		(penalty missed) Studer; (penalty scored) Fernández; (penalty scored) Barbieri; (penalty scored) Cardillo

=== Trofeo de Campeones ===
20 December 2025 Final	Estudiantes	2–1	Club Atlético Platense	San Nicolás de los Arroyos
18:00 UTC−3	Alario 79', 90'	Report	Zapiola 49'	Stadium: Estadio Único de San Nicolás; Referee: Leandro Rey Hilfer
