= 2025 Torneo Apertura final =

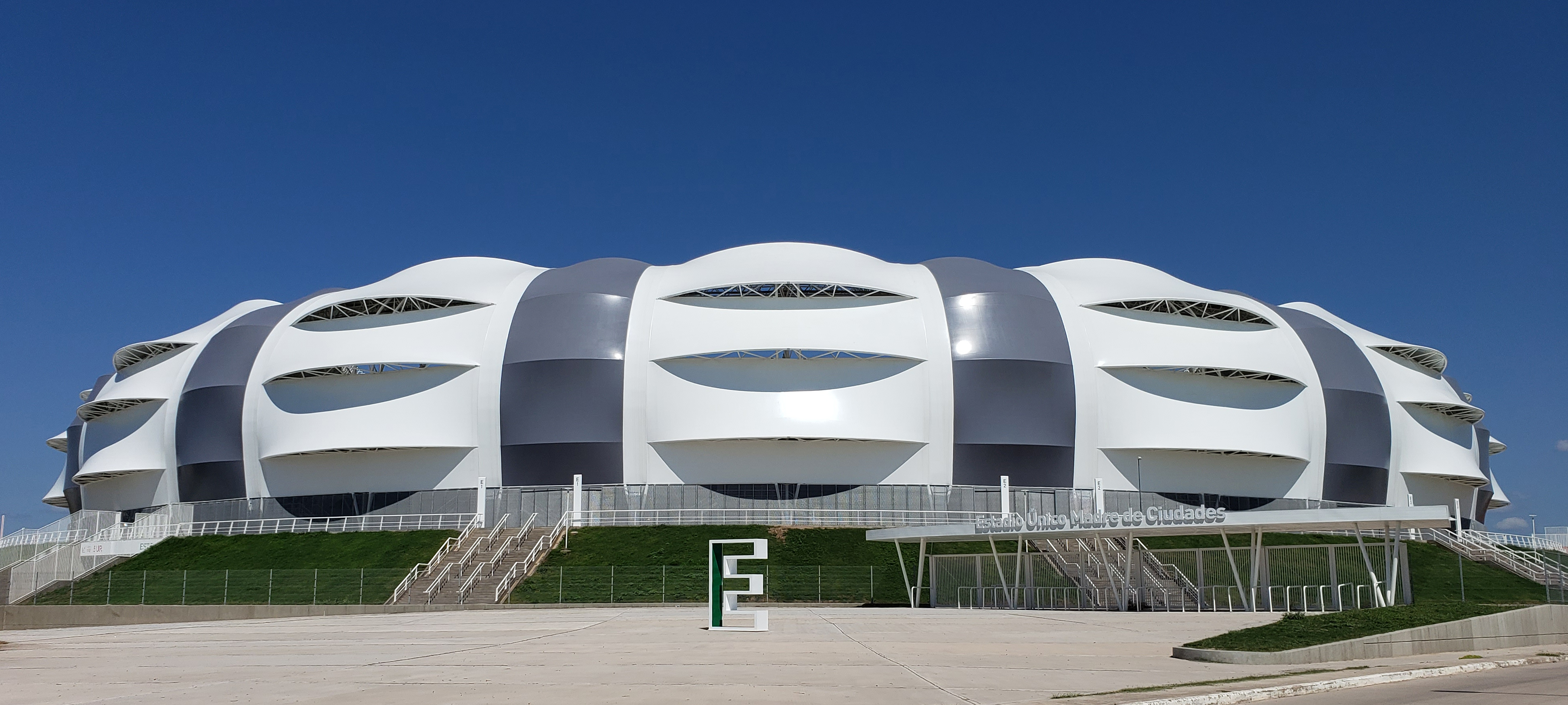
- Estadio Único Madre de Ciudades, venue
- Event: 2025 Torneo Apertura
Huracán	Platense
0	1
- Date: 1 June 2025
- Venue: Único Madre de Ciudades, Santiago del Estero
- Referee: Facundo Tello

The 2025 Torneo Apertura final was the last match of the 2025 Torneo Apertura of the 2025 Argentine Primera División. It was held at the Estadio Único Madre de Ciudades in Santiago del Estero on 1 June 2025, between Platense and Huracán. Huracán were seeking their sixth league title, with their last championship won in 1973. On the other hand, Platense had never been crowned Primera División champions.

Nicolás Ramírez was initially scheduled to referee the final, but he suffered a muscle injury in his left leg a few days beforehand. Consequently, the AFA appointed Facundo Tello as the referee for the final.

Platense won their first title in the highest division of Argentine football after they defeated Huracán 1–0. As champions, they qualified for the 2026 Copa Libertadores and the 2025 Trofeo de Campeones.

== Qualified teams ==
Team	Previous finals app.
Huracán	1923, **1925**
Platense	None

Bold indicates winning years

== Road to the final ==
Note: In all results below, the score of the finalist is given first (H: home; A: away; N: neutral venue).

Platense		Round	Huracán	
Opponent	Result	Group stage	Opponent	Result
River Plate	1–1 (H)	Matchday 1	Belgrano	1–1 (A)
Vélez Sarsfield	1–0 (A)	Matchday 2	Estudiantes (LP)	0–0 (H)
Argentinos Juniors	0–1 (A)	Matchday 3	Boca Juniors	1–2 (A)
Instituto	1–0 (H)	Matchday 4	Tigre	2–0 (H)
San Lorenzo	1–2 (A)	Matchday 5	Argentinos Juniors	1–1 (A)
Independiente	1–1 (H)	Matchday 6	Unión	1–0 (H)
Godoy Cruz	1–1 (A)	Matchday 7	San Lorenzo	2–0 (H)
Defensa y Justicia	0–1 (H)	Matchday 8	Vélez Sarsfield	2–0 (A)
Lanús	0–0 (H)	Matchday 9	Racing	1–0 (A)
San Martín (SJ)	2–0 (A)	Matchday 10	Independiente Rivadavia	2–0 (H)
Atlético Tucumán	2–1 (H)	Matchday 11	Banfield	0–0 (A)
Deportivo Riestra	0–1 (A)	Matchday 12	Aldosivi	3–3 (H)
Rosario Central	0–0 (H)	Matchday 13	Central Córdoba (SdE)	2–1 (A)
Sarmiento (J)	1–0 (A)	Matchday 14	Defensa y Justicia	1–1 (H)
Talleres (C)	2–1 (H)	Matchday 15	Newell's Old Boys	0–2 (A)
Gimnasia y Esgrima (LP)	0–1 (A)	Matchday 16	Barracas Central	0–1 (H)
**Zone B sixth place**: Pos / Team / Pld / W / D / L / GF / GA / GD / Pts; 1 / Rosario Central / 16 / 10 / 5 / 1 / 22 / 8 / +14 / 35; 2 / River Plate / 16 / 8 / 7 / 1 / 21 / 9 / +12 / 31; 3 / Independiente / 16 / 8 / 5 / 3 / 23 / 12 / +11 / 29; 4 / San Lorenzo / 16 / 7 / 6 / 3 / 14 / 10 / +4 / 27; 5 / Deportivo Riestra / 16 / 5 / 9 / 2 / 13 / 7 / +6 / 24; **6** / Platense / **16** / **6** / **5** / **5** / **13** / **11** / **+2** / 23; 7 / Lanús / 16 / 4 / 8 / 4 / 13 / 11 / +2 / 20; 8 / Instituto / 16 / 5 / 3 / 8 / 16 / 20 / −4 / 18; Source: AFA		Final standings	**Zone A fourth place**: Pos / Team / Pld / W / D / L / GF / GA / GD / Pts; 1 / Argentinos Juniors / 16 / 9 / 6 / 1 / 24 / 9 / +15 / 33; 2 / Boca Juniors / 16 / 10 / 3 / 3 / 24 / 11 / +13 / 33; 3 / Racing / 16 / 9 / 1 / 6 / 26 / 16 / +10 / 28; **4** / Huracán / **16** / **7** / **6** / **3** / **19** / **12** / **+7** / 27; 5 / Tigre / 16 / 8 / 3 / 5 / 18 / 12 / +6 / 27; 6 / Independiente Rivadavia / 16 / 7 / 6 / 3 / 20 / 17 / +3 / 27; 7 / Barracas Central / 16 / 7 / 5 / 4 / 20 / 18 / +2 / 26; 8 / Estudiantes (LP) / 16 / 5 / 6 / 5 / 18 / 19 / −1 / 21; Source: AFA	
Platense		Round	Huracán	
Opponent	Result	Final stages	Opponent	Result
Racing	1–0 (A)	Round of 16	Deportivo Riestra	3–2 (H)
River Plate	1–1 (4–2 (p)) (A)	Quarter-finals	Rosario Central	1–0 (A)
San Lorenzo	1–0 (A)	Semi-finals	Independiente	0–0 (6–5 (p)) (A)

== Match details ==
1 June 2025
17:00

Huracán	0–1	Platense
	Report	Mainero 63'

Estadio Único Madre de Ciudades, Santiago del Estero
Referee: Facundo Tello

**Huracán**	**Platense**

GK	1	(Ecuador) Hernán Galíndez (c)
RB	24	(Argentina) Tomás Guidara	(yellow card) 19'	(substituted off) 71'
CB	6	(Argentina) Fabio Pereyra
CB	31	(Argentina) Marco Pellegrino		(substituted off) 82'
LB	25	(Argentina) César Ibáñez
CM	5	(Argentina) Leonel Pérez		(substituted off) 71'
CM	8	(Chile) Leonardo Gil
RM	10	(Argentina) Walter Mazzantti
AM	18	(United States) Matko Miljevic	(yellow card) 74'
LM	11	(Argentina) Agustín Urzi		(substituted off) 57'
CF	43	(Argentina) Eric Ramírez		(substituted off) 46'
Substitutes:
GK	32	(Argentina) Sebastián Meza
DF	2	(Argentina) Nicolás Goitea
DF	3	(Argentina) Lucas Carrizo
DF	19	(Argentina) Leandro Lescano
DF	29	(Argentina) Hernán de la Fuente		(substituted on) 71'
MF	16	(Argentina) Rodrigo Cabral
MF	20	(Argentina) Emmanuel Ojeda
MF	21	(Argentina) Franco Watson
FW	7	(Argentina) Matías Tissera		(substituted on) 71'
FW	9	(Argentina) Ramón Ábila		(substituted on) 82'
FW	17	(Argentina) Gabriel Alanís		(substituted on) 57'
FW	26	(Argentina) Leonardo Sequeira		(substituted on) 46'
Manager:
(Argentina) Frank Kudelka

GK	31	(Argentina) Juan Pablo Cozzani	(yellow card) 84'
RB	25	(Argentina) Juan Ignacio Saborido
CB	13	(Argentina) Ignacio Vázquez (c)
CB	6	(Argentina) Oscar Salomón
LB	3	(Argentina) Tomás Silva	(yellow card) 24'	(substituted off) 49'
CM	5	(Argentina) Rodrigo Herrera	(yellow card) 68'	(substituted off) 85'
CM	14	(Argentina) Leonel Picco
RM	7	(Argentina) Guido Mainero	(yellow card) 88'
AM	77	(Paraguay) Ronaldo Martínez		(substituted off) 85'
LM	10	(Argentina) Vicente Taborda		(substituted off) 82'
CF	21	(Argentina) Augusto Lotti		(substituted off) 46'
Substitutes:
GK	1	(Argentina) Andrés Desábato
DF	2	(Argentina) Juan Pablo Pignani
DF	4	(Uruguay) Edgar Elizalde		(substituted on) 49'
DF	24	(Argentina) Bautista Barros Schelotto
MF	8	(Argentina) Fernando Juárez	(yellow card) 90+4'	(substituted on) 85'
MF	11	(Argentina) Franco Zapiola		(substituted on) 82'
MF	19	(Argentina) Santiago Toloza
MF	23	(Argentina) Enzo Roldán
MF	29	(Argentina) Franco Minerva
MF	32	(Argentina) Franco Baldassarra
FW	26	(Argentina) Ignacio Schor		(substituted on) 46'
FW	36	(Argentina) Nicolás Orsini		(substituted on) 85'
Managers:
(Argentina) Favio Orsi and (Argentina) Sergio Gómez

Man of the Match:
(Argentina) Guido Mainero (Platense)

Assistant referees:
Gabriel Chade
Juan Mamani
Fourth official:
Nazareno Arasa
Fifth official:
Pablo Acevedo
Video assistant referee:
Héctor Paletta
Assistant video assistant referees:
Lucas Novelli

**Match rules**

- 90 minutes
- 30 minutes of extra time if necessary
- Penalty shoot-out if scores still level
- Twelve named substitutes
- Maximum of five substitutions, with a sixth allowed in extra time

=== Statistics ===
Overall
	Huracán	Platense
Goals scored	0	1
Total shots	10	12
Shots on target	8	4
Ball possession	57%	43%
Corner kicks	1	3
Fouls committed	12	21
Offsides	3	0
Yellow cards	2	5
Red cards	0	0
