= 2025 Trofeo de Campeones de la Liga Profesional =

- Event: Trofeo de Campeones (LPF)
Estudiantes (LP)	Platense
2	1
- Date: 20 December 2025
- Venue: Estadio Único de San Nicolás, San Nicolás de los Arroyos
- Man of the Match: Lucas Alario (Estudiantes (LP))
- Referee: Leandro Rey Hilfer

The 2025 Trofeo de Campeones de la Liga Profesional (officially the Trofeo de Campeones Betano 2025 for sponsorship reasons) was the sixth edition of the Trofeo de Campeones de la Liga Profesional, an annual football match similar to the defunct Trofeo de Campeones de la Superliga Argentina. Starting this season, the tournament will be contested between the champions of the Torneo Apertura and the Torneo Clausura of the AFA Liga Profesional de Fútbol.

The final was contested by Platense (2025 Torneo Apertura champions) and Estudiantes (LP) (2025 Torneo Clausura) on 20 December 2025 at Estadio Único de San Nicolás in San Nicolás de los Arroyos. For organizational purposes, Estudiantes (LP) was chosen as the home team because they were ranked higher than Platense in the aggregate table for the 2025 season.

Estudiantes (LP) defeated Platense 2–1 to win their second title.

== Qualified teams ==
Team	Qualification	Previous app.
Platense	2025 Torneo Apertura champions	(none)
Estudiantes (LP)	2025 Torneo Clausura champions	(2024)

== Match ==
Santiago Arzamendia and Tiago Palacios (Estudiantes (LP) and Augusto Lotti (Platense) missed the match due to injuries.

=== Details ===
20 December 2025
18:00

Estudiantes (LP)	2–1	Platense
Alario 79', 90'	Report	Zapiola 49'

Estadio Único de San Nicolás, San Nicolás de los Arroyos
Referee: Leandro Rey Hilfer

Estudiantes (LP)	Platense

GK	28	(Uruguay) Fernando Muslera
DF	4	(Argentina) Román Gómez		(substituted off) 62'
DF	6	(Argentina) Santiago Núñez
DF	14	(Argentina) Leandro González Pírez	(yellow card) 79'
DF	13	(Argentina) Gastón Benedetti
MF	5	(Argentina) Santiago Ascacíbar (c)
MF	21	(Argentina) Ezequiel Piovi	(yellow card) 30'	(substituted off) 61'
MF	17	(Argentina) Joaquín Tobio Burgos		(substituted off) 61'
MF	25	(Argentina) Cristian Medina		(substituted off) 72'
MF	18	(Colombia) Edwuin Cetré		(substituted off) 90+2'
FW	9	(Argentina) Guido Carrillo
Substitutes:
GK	1	(Argentina) Fabricio Iacovich
DF	2	(Argentina) Facundo Rodríguez		(substituted in) 90+2'
DF	26	(Argentina) Ramiro Funes Mori
DF	20	(Argentina) Eric Meza		(substituted in) 62'
DF	36	(Argentina) Joaquín Pereyra
MF	7	(Argentina) José Sosa		(substituted in) 61'
MF	8	(Uruguay) Gabriel Neves
MF	11	(Argentina) Facundo Farías
MF	22	(Argentina) Alexis Castro
MF	32	(Argentina) Mikel Amondarain
FW	27	(Argentina) Lucas Alario		(substituted in) 72'
FW	29	(Argentina) Fabricio Pérez		(substituted in) 61'
Manager:
(Argentina) Eduardo Domínguez

GK	27	(Argentina) Federico Losas
DF	25	(Argentina) Juan Ignacio Saborido	(yellow card) 45+3'	(substituted off) 50'
DF	13	(Argentina) Ignacio Vázquez (c)	(yellow card) 79'
DF	6	(Argentina) Oscar Salomón
DF	3	(Argentina) Tomás Silva	(yellow card) 23'	(substituted off) 67'
MF	7	(Argentina) Guido Mainero	(yellow card) 34'	(substituted off) 80'
MF	5	(Argentina) Rodrigo Herrera
MF	14	(Argentina) Leonel Picco
MF	11	(Argentina) Franco Zapiola		(substituted off) 67'
FW	26	(Argentina) Ignacio Schor	(yellow card) 25'	(substituted off) 81'
FW	77	(Paraguay) Ronaldo Martínez
Substitutes:
GK	1	(Argentina) Andrés Desábato
DF	4	(Uruguay) Edgar Elizalde		(substituted in) 67'
DF	22	(Argentina) Raúl Lozano		(substituted in) 50'
DF	24	(Argentina) Bautista Barros Schelotto
MF	16	(Argentina) Mauro Luna Diale
MF	17	(Argentina) Felipe Bussio
MF	19	(Argentina) Santiago Toloza
MF	29	(Argentina) Franco Minerva		(substituted in) 67'
MF	32	(Argentina) Franco Baldassarra		(substituted in) 80'
FW	9	(Chile) Maximiliano Rodríguez
FW	36	(Argentina) Nicolás Orsini		(substituted in) 81'
FW	47	(Argentina) Benjamín Bosch
Manager:
(Argentina) Walter Zunino

Player of the Match:
Lucas Alario (Estudiantes (LP))

Assistant referees:
Cristian Navarro
Pablo González
Fourth official:
Luis Lobo Medina
Fifth official:
Adrián Delbarba
Video assistant referee:
Pablo Dóvalo
Assistant video assistant referees:
Lucas Germanota

Match rules

- 90 minutes
- 30 minutes of extra time if necessary
- Penalty shoot-out if scores still level
- Twelve named substitutes
- Maximum of five substitutions, with a sixth allowed in extra time

=== Statistics ===
Overall
	Estudiantes (LP)	Platense
Goals scored	2	1
Total shots	7	5
Shots on target	6	3
Ball possession	61%	39%
Corner kicks	6	3
Fouls committed	9	15
Offsides	4	1
Yellow cards	2	5
Red cards	0	0
