= 2024 Club Bolívar season =

Club Bolívar
2024 season
- Manager: Flavio Robatto
- Stadium: Estadio Hernando Siles
- Torneo Apertura: Quarter-finals
- Torneo Clausura: Winners
- Copa Libertadores: Round of 16
- Top goalscorer: League: Carlos Melgar (18); All: Carlos Melgar (18)
- Biggest win: Blooming 0–5 Bolívar; Bolívar 5–0 Royal Pari
- Biggest defeat: Flamengo 4–0 Bolívar

The 2024 season was Club Bolívar's 99th season in its history and its 59th consecutive season in the Bolivian Primera División, the top tier of Bolivian football. The club also competed in the Copa Libertadores.

== Squad ==
=== Transfers In ===
Pos.	Player	Transferred from	Fee	Date	Source
GK	(Argentina) Andrés Desábato	(Argentina) Barracas Central	Free	17 January 2024	
DF	(Uruguay) Renzo Orihuela	(Uruguay) Montevideo City Torque	Loan	22 January 2024	
MF	(Bolivia) Erwin Saavedra	(South Africa) Mamelodi Sundowns	Loan	23 February 2024	
MF	(Bolivia) Henry Vaca	(Israel) Maccabi Bnei Reineh	Free	7 March 2024	
MF	(Bolivia) Carlos Melgar	(Bolivia) Guabirá	Undisclosed	1 June 2024	
MF	(Spain) Álex Granell	(Belgium) Lommel	Free	24 June 2024	
DF	(Bolivia) Diego Arroyo	(Brazil) Bahia U20	Loan return	30 June 2024	
DF	(Brazil) Anderson	(Portugal) Vizela	Free	1 July 2024	
GK	(Bolivia) Rubén Cordano	(Bolivia) Oriente Petrolero	Undisclosed	1 July 2024	
FW	(Paraguay) Alfio Oviedo	(Paraguay) Cerro Porteño	Free	1 July 2024	

=== Transfers Out ===
Pos.	Player	Transferred to	Fee	Date	Source
MF	(Bolivia) Carlos Melgar	(Bolivia) Guabirá	Undisclosed	14 January 2024	
GK	(Argentina) Andrés Desábato	(Argentina) Platense	Contract terminated	20 June 2024	
FW	(Brazil) Francisco da Costa	(Paraguay) Cerro Porteño	US$1,500,000	28 June 2024	
MF	(Bolivia) Miguel Villarroel	(Bolivia) Oriente Petrolero	Undisclosed	19 July 2024	
MF	(Bolivia) Lucas Chávez	(Saudi Arabia) Al Taawoun	Loan	2 September 2024	

== Friendlies ==
26 June 2024	Alianza Lima (Peru)	2–3	(Bolivia) Bolívar

30 June 2024	Atlético Nacional (Colombia)	2–0	(Bolivia) Bolívar

== Competitions ==
=== Overall record ===
Competition	First match	Last match	Starting round	Final position	Record							
Competition	First match	Last match	Starting round	Final position	Pld	W	D	L	GF	GA	GD	Win %
Torneo Apertura	17 February 2024	18 April 2024	Matchday 1	Quarter-finals	10	5	2	3	20	15	+5	50.00
Torneo Clausura	12 May 2024	20 December 2024	Matchday 1	Winners	30	20	7	3	76	25	+51	66.67
Copa Libertadores	4 April 2024	22 August 2024	Group stage	Round of 16	8	5	1	2	14	11	+3	62.50
Total					48	30	10	8	110	51	+59	62.50

Source: Competitions

=== División Profesional ===
==== Torneo Apertura ====
===== Results by round =====
Round	1	2	3	4	5	6	7	8
Ground	H	A	H	A	A	H	H	A
Result	W	W	D	W	L	W	W	L
Position	2	1	1	1	1	1	1	1

A = Away; H = Home; W = Win; D = Draw; L = Loss

17 February 2024 1	Bolívar	3–1	GV San José

21 February 2024 2	Oriente Petrolero	0–2	Bolívar

25 February 2024 3	Bolívar	4–4	The Strongest

2 March 2024 4	Jorge Wilstermann	1–2	Bolívar

10 March 2024 5	The Strongest	2–1	Bolívar

14 March 2024 6	Bolívar	2–1	Jorge Wilstermann

31 March 2024 7	Bolívar	4–2	Oriente Petrolero

7 April 2024 8	GV San José	2–1	Bolívar

==== Play-offs ====
14 April 2024 Quarter-finals; First leg	San Antonio Bulo Bulo	1–0	Bolívar

18 April 2024 Quarter-finals; Second leg	Bolívar	1–1	San Antonio Bulo Bulo

==== Torneo Clausura ====
===== Results by round =====
Round	1	2	3	4	5	6	7	8	9	10	11	12	13	14	15	16	17	18	19	20	21	22	23	24	25	26	27	28	29	30
Ground	A	H	A	H	A	H	A	H	A	H	A	H	A	H	A	H	A	H	A	H	A	H	A	H	A	H	A	H	A	H
Result	W	W	D	W	W	D	L	W	W	W	D	D	W	W	W	W	D	L	W	D	W	W	L	W	D	W	W	W	W	W
Position	7	1	2	1	1	1	1	1	1	1	1	1	1	1	1	1	1	1	1	1	1	1	1	1	1	1	1	1	1	1

A = Away; H = Home; W = Win; D = Draw; L = Loss

12 May 2024 1	Independiente Petrolero	0–1	Bolívar

19 May 2024 2	Bolívar	4–1	Real Tomayapo

22 May 2024 3	Club Aurora	1–1	Bolívar

25 May 2024 4	Bolívar	4–0	Real Santa Cruz

14 July 2024 5	Blooming	0–5	Bolívar

21 July 2024 6	Bolívar	0–0	Always Ready

28 July 2024 7	Nacional Potosí	2–1	Bolívar

31 July 2024 8	Bolívar	4–0	GV San José

3 August 2024 9	Royal Pari	0–1	Bolívar

8 August 2024 10	Bolívar	2–0	Jorge Wilstermann

19 August 2024 12	Bolívar	0–0	San Antonio Bulo Bulo

25 August 2024 13	Universitario de Vinto	0–1	Bolívar

15 September 2024 14	Bolívar	2–0	Oriente Petrolero

18 September 2024 11	The Strongest	1–1	Bolívar

22 September 2024 15	Guabirá	0–3	Bolívar

25 September 2024 16	Bolívar	3–0	Independiente Petrolero

19 October 2024 18	Bolívar	0–1	Club Aurora

23 October 2024 19	Real Santa Cruz	2–3	Bolívar

26 October 2024 20	Bolívar	0–0	Blooming

30 October 2024 21	Always Ready	1–5	Bolívar

21 November 2024 17	Real Tomayapo	2–2	Bolívar

24 November 2024 22	Bolívar	5–3	Nacional Potosí

27 November 2024 23	GV San José	3–2	Bolívar

30 November 2024 24	Bolívar	5–0	Royal Pari

5 December 2024 25	Jorge Wilstermann	2–2	Bolívar

8 December 2024 26	Bolívar	4–1	The Strongest

10 December 2024 27	San Antonio Bulo Bulo	1–3	Bolívar

13 December 2024 28	Bolívar	5–1	Universitario de Vinto

18 December 2024 29	Oriente Petrolero	1–4	Bolívar

20 December 2024 30	Bolívar	3–2	Guabirá

=== Copa Libertadores ===
==== Group stage ====
Group E

Pos	Team	Pld	W	D	L	GF	GA	GD	Pts	Qualification
1	(Bolivia) Bolívar	6	4	1	1	13	9	+4	13	Advance to round of 16
2	(Brazil) Flamengo	6	3	1	2	11	4	+7	10	Advance to round of 16
3	(Chile) Palestino	6	2	1	3	6	11	−5	7	Transfer to Copa Sudamericana
4	(Colombia) Millonarios	6	0	3	3	6	12	−6	3	

Source: CONMEBOL
Rules for classification: 1) Points; 2) Goal difference; 3) Goals scored; 4) Away goals scored; 5) CONMEBOL ranking.

4 April 2024 1	Palestino (Chile)	0–4	(Bolivia) Bolívar	Rancagua, Chile
				Stadium: Estadio El Teniente; Attendance: 3,114; Referee: Yael Falcón (Argentina)

11 April 2024 2	Bolívar (Bolivia)	3–2	(Colombia) Millonarios	La Paz
				Stadium: Estadio Hernando Siles; Attendance: 14,485; Referee: Guillermo Guerrero (Ecuador)

24 April 2024 3	Bolívar (Bolivia)	2–1	(Brazil) Flamengo	La Paz
				Stadium: Estadio Hernando Siles; Attendance: 22,620; Referee: Alexis Herrera (Venezuela)

8 May 2024 4	Millonarios (Colombia)	1–1	(Bolivia) Bolívar	Bogotá, Colombia
				Stadium: Estadio El Campín; Attendance: 17,336; Referee: Yael Falcón (Argentina)

15 May 2024 5	Flamengo (Brazil)	4–0	(Bolivia) Bolívar	Rio de Janeiro, Brazil
				Stadium: Maracanã Stadium; Attendance: 63,169; Referee: Andrés Matonte (Uruguay)

28 May 2024 6	Bolívar (Bolivia)	3–1	(Chile) Palestino	La Paz
				Stadium: Estadio Hernando Siles; Attendance: 20,757; Referee: Andrés Merlos (Argentina)

==== Round of 16 ====
15 August 2024 First leg	Flamengo (Brazil)	2–0	(Bolivia) Bolívar	Rio de Janeiro, Brazil
21:30 UTC−3	Luiz Araújo 29'; Pulgar (yellow card) 52'; De la Cruz (yellow card) 60'; Léo Pereira 89'		Justiniano (yellow card) 30'	Stadium: Maracanã Stadium; Attendance: 65,381; Referee: Wilmar Roldán (Colombia)

22 August 2024 Second leg	Bolívar (Bolivia)	1–0 (1–2 agg.)	(Brazil) Flamengo	La Paz
20:30 UTC−4	Anderson (yellow card) 47' (red card) 89'; Bruno Sávio 57', (yellow card) 90'		De la Cruz (yellow card) 28'; Gerson (yellow card) 61'; Evertton Araújo (yellow card) 90+5'	Stadium: Estadio Hernando Siles; Attendance: 29,168; Referee: Yael Falcón (Argentina)
