= 2025 Club Atlético Vélez Sarsfield season =

Club Atlético Vélez Sarsfield
2025 season
- Chairman: Fabian Berlanga
- Manager: Sebastián Domínguez (until 2 March); Guillermo Barros Schelotto (from 19 March)
- Stadium: José Amalfitani Stadium
- Torneo Apertura: 13th
- Torneo Clausura: Round of 16
- Copa Argentina: Round of 32
- Supercopa Argentina: Winner
- Supercopa Internacional: Winner
- Copa Libertadores: Quarter-finals
- Average home league attendance: 24,364
Home colours	Away colours

The 2025 season is the 115th for Club Atlético Vélez Sarsfield and their 11th consecutive season in the Primera División. The club will also compete in the Copa Argentina, Supercopa Internacional, Supercopa Argentina, and Copa Libertadores.

== Squad ==
=== Transfers In ===
Pos.	Player	Transferred from	Fee	Date	Source
FW	(Malaysia) Imanol Machuca	(Brazil) Fortaleza	€244,000 loan fee	13 January 2025	
DF	(Argentina) Lisandro Magallán	(Mexico) Pumas UNAM	Free	18 June 2025	
MF	(Chile) Diego Valdés	(Mexico) América	$3,500,000	21 June 2025	
MF	(Argentina) Rodrigo Aliendro	(Argentina) River Plate	Free	24 July 2025	
MF	(Argentina) Manuel Lanzini	(Argentina) River Plate	Undisclosed	21 August 2025	

=== Transfers Out ===
Pos.	Player	Transferred to	Fee	Date	Source
FW	(Spain) Mateo Pellegrino	(Italy) Parma	€2,000,000	3 February 2025	
MF	(Argentina) Christian Ordóñez	(Italy) Parma	Undisclosed	7 June 2025	
FW	(Brazil) Lenny Lobato	(Argentina) Defensa y Justicia	Loan	9 July 2025	
DF	(Argentina) Valentín Gómez	(Spain) Real Betis	€5,300,000	26 July 2025	

== Friendlies ==
15 January 2025 Friendly	Vélez Sársfield (Argentina)	1–1	(Peru) Alianza Lima

15 January 2025 Friendly	Vélez Sársfield (Argentina)	0–1	(Peru) Alianza Lima
			Aguirre 25'

== Competitions ==
=== Overall record ===
Competition	First match	Last match	Starting round	Final position	Record							
Competition	First match	Last match	Starting round	Final position	Pld	W	D	L	GF	GA	GD	Win %
Torneo Apertura	23 January 2025	4 May 2025	Matchday 1	13th	16	4	2	10	7	22	−15	25.00
Torneo Clausura	14 July 2025	22 November 2025	Matchday 1	Round of 16	17	7	5	5	19	14	+5	41.18
Copa Argentina	26 February 2025	21 May 2025	Round of 64	Round of 32	2	1	0	1	1	2	−1	50.00
Supercopa Internacional	8 July 2025		Finals	Winner	1	1	0	0	2	0	+2	100.00
Supercopa Argentina	6 September 2025		Finals	Winner	1	1	0	0	2	0	+2	100.00
Copa Libertadores	2 April 2025	23 September 2025	Group stage	Quarter-finals	10	4	3	3	13	6	+7	40.00
Total					47	18	10	19	44	44	+0	38.30

Source: Competitions

=== Primera División ===
==== Torneo Apertura ====
===== League table =====
Pos	Team	Pld	W	D	L	GF	GA	GD	Pts
11	Gimnasia y Esgrima (LP)	16	4	4	8	9	18	−9	16
12	Sarmiento (J)	16	2	9	5	11	19	−8	15
13	Vélez Sarsfield	16	4	2	10	7	22	−15	14
14	Talleres (C)	16	2	7	7	11	15	−4	13
15	San Martín (SJ)	16	2	3	11	5	18	−13	9

Source: AFA

===== Results by round =====
Round	1
Ground	A
Result	
Position	

A = Away; H = Home; W = Win; D = Draw; L = Loss

===== Matches =====
23 January 2025 1	Tigre	3–0	Vélez Sarsfield	Buenos Aires
21:00 UTC−3	Russo 3', 9'; Ortega 47'	Report		Stadium: Estadio José Dellagiovanna

28 January 2025 2	Vélez Sarsfield	0–1	Platense	Buenos Aires
21:30 UTC−3		Report	Mainero 90+3'	Stadium: José Amalfitani Stadium

2 February 2025 3	Instituto	2–0	Vélez Sarsfield	Córdoba
21:30 UTC−3	Lodico 43'; Batallini 51'	Report		Stadium: Estadio Juan Domingo Perón

8 February 2025 4	Vélez Sarsfield	0–0	San Lorenzo	Buenos Aires
18:00 UTC−3		Report		Stadium: José Amalfitani Stadium

12 February 2025 5	Independiente	3–0	Vélez Sarsfield	Avellaneda
20:00 UTC−3	Ávalos 31', 43'; Cabral 78'	Report		Stadium: Estadio Libertadores de América

17 February 2025 6	Vélez Sarsfield	0–2	Godoy Cruz	Buenos Aires
21:30 UTC−3		Report	Pizzini 18' (o.g.); Altamira 28'	Stadium: José Amalfitani Stadium

21 February 2025 7	Lanús	0–0	Vélez Sarsfield	Lanús
21:30 UTC−3		Report		Stadium: Estadio Ciudad de Lanús

2 March 2025 8	Vélez Sarsfield	0–2	Huracán	Buenos Aires
19:15 UTC−3		Report	Ramírez 22'; Tissera 80'	Stadium: José Amalfitani Stadium

7 March 2025 9	Vélez Sarsfield	1–0	San Martín	Buenos Aires
19:00 UTC−3	Romero 80'	Report		Stadium: José Amalfitani Stadium

17 March 2025 10	Atlético Tucumán	1–2	Vélez Sarsfield	Tucumán
21:15 UTC−3	Díaz 21'	Report	Romero 27'; Carrizo 68'	Stadium: Estadio Monumental José Fierro

28 March 2025 11	Vélez Sarsfield	0–1	Deportivo Riestra	Buenos Aires
21:30 UTC−3		Report	Herrera 9'	Stadium: José Amalfitani Stadium

5 April 2025 12	Rosario Central	2–1	Vélez Sarsfield	Rosario
15:30 UTC−3	Sández 58'; Giménez 90+1'	Report	Romero 10'	Stadium: Estadio Gigante de Arroyito

17 April 2025 13	Vélez Sarsfield	0–1	Sarmiento	Buenos Aires
21:15 UTC−3		Report	Frías 71'	Stadium: José Amalfitani Stadium

18 April 2025 14	Talleres	0–1	Vélez Sarsfield	Córdoba
19:15 UTC−3		Report	Carrizo 48'	Stadium: Estadio Mario Alberto Kempes

28 April 2025 15	Vélez Sarsfield	1–0	Gimnasia y Esgrima	Buenos Aires
21:45 UTC−3	Romero 76'	Report		Stadium: José Amalfitani Stadium

4 May 2025 16	River Plate	4–1	Vélez Sarsfield	Buenos Aires
21:30 UTC−3	Driussi 14'; Colidio 28'; Fernández 33'; Borja 90+10' (pen.)	Report	Carrizo 37'	Stadium: Estadio Monumental; Referee: Andrés Merlos

==== Torneo Clausura ====
===== League table =====
Pos	Team	Pld	W	D	L	GF	GA	GD	Pts	Qualification
2	Lanús	16	9	3	4	20	13	+7	30	Advance to round of 16
3	Deportivo Riestra	16	8	4	4	19	12	+7	28	Advance to round of 16
4	Vélez Sarsfield	16	7	5	4	19	12	+7	26	Advance to round of 16
5	San Lorenzo	16	6	6	4	13	11	+2	24	Advance to round of 16
6	River Plate	16	6	4	6	20	15	+5	22	Advance to round of 16

Source: AFA

===== Matches =====
14 July 2025 1	Vélez Sarsfield	2–1	Tigre	Buenos Aires
21:15 UTC−3	Galván 45'; Machuca 45+4'	Report	Sosa 85' (pen.)	Stadium: José Amalfitani Stadium

19 July 2025 2	Platense	0–0	Vélez Sarsfield	Florida
18:45 UTC−3		Report		Stadium: Estadio Ciudad de Vicente López

26 July 2025 3	Vélez Sarsfield	0–0	Instituto	Buenos Aires
19:00 UTC−3		Report		Stadium: José Amalfitani Stadium

7 August 2025 4	San Lorenzo	1–0	Vélez Sarsfield	Buenos Aires
19:00 UTC−3	Cuello 28'	Report		Stadium: Estadio Pedro Bidegain

16 August 2025 5	Vélez Sarsfield	2–1	Independiente	Buenos Aires
19:00 UTC−3	Godoy 35' (pen.); Romero 84'	Report	Loyola 76' (pen.)	Stadium: José Amalfitani Stadium

25 August 2025 6	Godoy Cruz	0–2	Vélez Sarsfield	Godoy Cruz
17:00 UTC−3		Report	Mendoza 23' (o.g.); Carrizo 31'	Stadium: Estadio Feliciano Gambarte

30 August 2025 7	Vélez Sarsfield	3–0	Lanús	Buenos Aires
21:30 UTC−3	Romero 22'; Galván 50'; Carrizo 53'	Report		Stadium: José Amalfitani Stadium

12 September 2025 8	Huracán	0–0	Vélez Sarsfield	Buenos Aires
19:00 UTC−3		Report		Stadium: Estadio Tomás Adolfo Ducó; Referee: Yael Falcón Pérez

19 September 2025 9	San Martín	1–2	Vélez Sarsfield	San Juan
19:15 UTC−3	Maestro Puch 59'	Report	Lanzini 10'; Godoy 46'	Stadium: Estadio Ingeniero Hilario Sánchez

29 September 2025 10	Vélez Sarsfield	3–1	Atlético Tucumán	Buenos Aires
20:00 UTC−3	Romero 36', 39'; Valdés 90+4'	Report	Bajamach 14'	Stadium: José Amalfitani Stadium

6 October 2025 11	Deportivo Riestra	2–2	Vélez Sarsfield	Buenos Aires
19:00 UTC−3	Díaz 38'; Herrera 55'	Report	Magallán 45+1'; Ramírez 87' (o.g.)	Stadium: Estadio Guillermo Laza

11 October 2025 12	Vélez Sarsfield	1–2	Rosario Central	Buenos Aires
21:15 UTC−3	Lanzini 51'	Report	Véliz 17'; Malcorra 90+7' (pen.)	Stadium: José Amalfitani Stadium

19 October 2025 13	Sarmiento	0–2	Vélez Sarsfield	Junín
15:00 UTC−3		Report	Lanzini 61'; Pizzini 67'	Stadium: Estadio Eva Perón

1 November 2025 14	Vélez Sarsfield	0–1	Talleres	Buenos Aires
17:00 UTC−3		Report	Cáceres 48'	Stadium: José Amalfitani Stadium

10 November 2025 15	Gimnasia y Esgrima	2–0	Vélez Sarsfield	La Plata
17:00 UTC−3	Torres 34'; Merlo 68'	Report		Stadium: Estadio Juan Carmelo Zerillo

16 November 2025 16	Vélez Sarsfield	0–0	River Plate	Buenos Aires
17:00 UTC−3		Report		Stadium: José Amalfitani Stadium; Referee: Leandro Rey Hilfer

===== Final stages =====
22 November 2025 Round of 16	Vélez Sarsfield	0–2	Argentinos Juniors	Buenos Aires
20:00		Report	López Muñoz 57', 61'	Stadium: José Amalfitani; Referee: Andrés Merlos

=== Copa Argentina ===
26 February 2025 Round of 64	Vélez Sarsfield	1–0	Midland	Florida
19:15	Romero 77' (pen.)	Report		Stadium: Ciudad de Vicente López; Referee: Hernán Mastrángelo

21 May 2025 Round of 32	Lanús	2–0	Vélez Sarsfield	Morón
21:10	Carrera 21'; Salvio 36'	Report		Stadium: Nuevo Francisco Urbano; Referee: Andrés Gariano

=== Supercopa Internacional ===
8 July 2025 Final	Estudiantes (LP)	0–2	Vélez Sarsfield	Avellaneda
20:30 UTC-3		Report	Galván 52'; Romero 73'	Stadium: Estadio Libertadores de América; Referee: Darío Herrera

=== Supercopa Argentina ===
6 September 2025 Final	Vélez Sarsfield	2–0	Central Córdoba	Rosario
15:00 UTC−3	Gordon 50', 86'	Report		Stadium: Estadio Gigante de Arroyito; Referee: Facundo Tello

=== Copa Libertadores ===
==== Group stage ====
Pos	Team	Pld	W	D	L	GF	GA	GD	Pts	Qualification
1	(Argentina) Vélez Sarsfield	6	3	2	1	11	4	+7	11	Advance to round of 16
2	(Uruguay) Peñarol	6	3	2	1	9	4	+5	11	Advance to round of 16
3	(Bolivia) San Antonio Bulo Bulo	6	2	0	4	5	15	−10	6	Transfer to Copa Sudamericana
4	(Paraguay) Olimpia	6	1	2	3	9	11	−2	5	

Source: CONMEBOL

2 April 2025 1	Vélez Sarsfield (Argentina)	2–1	(Uruguay) Peñarol	Buenos Aires
19:00 UTC−3	Carrizo 80'; Montoro 90+5'	Report	Fernández 48'	Stadium: Estadio José Amalfitani; Attendance: 20,108; Referee: Raphael Claus (Brazil)

9 April 2025 2	Olimpia (Paraguay)	0–4	(Argentina) Vélez Sarsfield	Asunción, Paraguay
19:00 UTC−3		Report	Romero 25', 49' (pen.); Carrizo 56'; Pizzini 90+3'	Stadium: Estadio Defensores del Chaco (Note: Olimpia play their home matches at Estadio Defensores del Chaco, Asunción instead of their regular stadium Estadio Osvaldo Domínguez Dibb, Asunción which is being rebuilt.); Attendance: 19,422; Referee: Piero Maza (Chile)

23 April 2025 3	San Antonio Bulo Bulo (Bolivia)	2–1	(Argentina) Vélez Sarsfield	Cochabamba, Bolivia
18:00 UTC−4	E. Gómez 26' (o.g.); Santos 86' (o.g.)	Report	Montoro 90'	Stadium: Estadio Félix Capriles (Note: San Antonio Bulo Bulo play their home matches at Estadio Félix Capriles, Cochabamba instead of their regular stadium Estadio Dr. Carlos Villegas, Entre Ríos which did not meet CONMEBOL requirements.); Attendance: 1,848; Referee: Wilton Sampaio (Brazil)

8 May 2025 4	Vélez Sarsfield (Argentina)	1–1	(Paraguay) Olimpia	Buenos Aires
19:00 UTC−3	Carrizo 33'	Report	Fernández 90+2'	Stadium: Estadio José Amalfitani; Attendance: 13,928; Referee: Raphael Claus (Brazil)
Note: The Vélez Sarsfield v Olimpia match, originally scheduled for 6 May 2025, 21:30 local time, was rescheduled to 8 May 2025, 19:00 local time.

14 May 2025 5	Vélez Sarsfield (Argentina)	3–0	(Bolivia) San Antonio Bulo Bulo	Buenos Aires
19:00 UTC−3	Carrizo 68' (pen.); Santos 79'; Montoro 90+4'	Report		Stadium: Estadio José Amalfitani; Attendance: 16,715; Referee: Alexis Herrera (Venezuela)

29 May 2025 6	Peñarol (Uruguay)	0–0	(Argentina) Vélez Sarsfield	Montevideo, Uruguay
19:00 UTC−3		Report		Stadium: Estadio Campeón del Siglo; Attendance: 0 (Note: Peñarol will play their home matches in the group stage behind closed doors as they were punished for incidents in their 2024 Copa Libertadores home matches against Flamengo and Botafogo.); Referee: Anderson Daronco (Brazil)

==== Final stages ====
The draw for the round of 16 was held on 2 June 2025, 12:00 PYT (UTC−3) at the CONMEBOL headquarters in Luque, Paraguay.

==== Round of 16 ====
12 August 2025 First leg	Fortaleza (Brazil)	0–0	(Argentina) Vélez Sarsfield	Fortaleza, Brazil
19:00 UTC−3		Report		Stadium: Castelão; Attendance: 27,955; Referee: Derlis López (Paraguay)

19 August 2025 Second leg	Vélez Sarsfield (Argentina)	2–0 (2–0 agg.)	(Brazil) Fortaleza	Buenos Aires, Argentina
19:00 UTC−3	Carrizo 7'; Galván 28'	Report		Stadium: Estadio José Amalfitani; Attendance: 11,581; Referee: Andrés Rojas (Colombia)

==== Quarter-finals ====
16 September 2025 First leg	Vélez Sarsfield (Argentina)	0–1	(Argentina) Racing	Buenos Aires, Argentina
19:00 UTC−3		Report	Martínez 53'	Stadium: Estadio José Amalfitani; Referee: Wilton Sampaio (Brazil)

23 September 2025 Second leg	Racing (Argentina)	1–0 (2–0 agg.)	(Argentina) Vélez Sarsfield	Avellaneda, Argentina
19:00 UTC−3	Solari 82'			Stadium: El Cilindro; Referee: Esteban Ostojich (Uruguay)
