= Benjamín Bosch =

Argentine footballer (born 2005)

Personal information
- Full name: Gianluca Benjamín Bosch
- Date of birth: 15 June 2005 (age 21)
- Place of birth: Vicente López, Argentina
- Height: 1.73 m (5 ft 8 in)
- Position: Right winger

Team information
- Current team: Orenburg (on loan from Talleres)
- Number: 21

Youth career
- Vélez Sarsfield

Senior career*
Years	Team	Apps	(Gls)
2024–2026	Vélez Sarsfield	4	(0)
2025–2026	→ Platense (loan)	2	(0)
2026–	Talleres	0	(0)
2026–	→ Orenburg (loan)	2	(0)

International career^{‡}
2024	Argentina U20	4	(0)
- * Club domestic league appearances and goals as of 14 August 2026 ‡ National team caps and goals as of 4 September 2024

Gianluca Benjamín Bosch, known as Benjamín Bosch (born 15 June 2005) is an Argentine football player who plays as a right winger for Russian club Orenburg on loan from Talleres.

== Career ==
Bosch was raised in the youth system of Vélez Sarsfield and made his debut for the senior team in 2024. He played on loan at Platense in 2025–26.

In July 2026, Bosch was loaned by Talleres to Russian Premier League club Orenburg for the 2026–27 season, with an option to buy.

He made his RPL debut for Orenburg on 2 August 2026 in a game against Zenit St. Petersburg.

== Career statistics ==
As of 2 September 2026

Club	Season	League			Cup		Continental		Other		Total	
Club	Season	Division	Apps	Goals	Apps	Goals	Apps	Goals	Apps	Goals	Apps	Goals
Vélez Sarsfield	2024	AFA Liga Profesional de Fútbol	2	0	0	0	—		0	0	2	0
Vélez Sarsfield	2025	AFA Liga Profesional de Fútbol	2	0	0	0	0	0	0	0	2	0
Vélez Sarsfield	Total		4	0	0	0	0	0	0	0	4	0
Platense (loan)	2025	AFA Liga Profesional de Fútbol	2	0	1	0	0	0	0	0	3	0
Orenburg (loan)	2026–27	Russian Premier League	2	0	3	0	—		—		5	0
Career total			8	0	4	0	0	0	0	0	12	0

== Honours ==
Vélez Sarsfield

- AFA Liga Profesional de Fútbol: 2024
