= Frank Kudelka (football manager) =

Argentine football manager (born 1961)

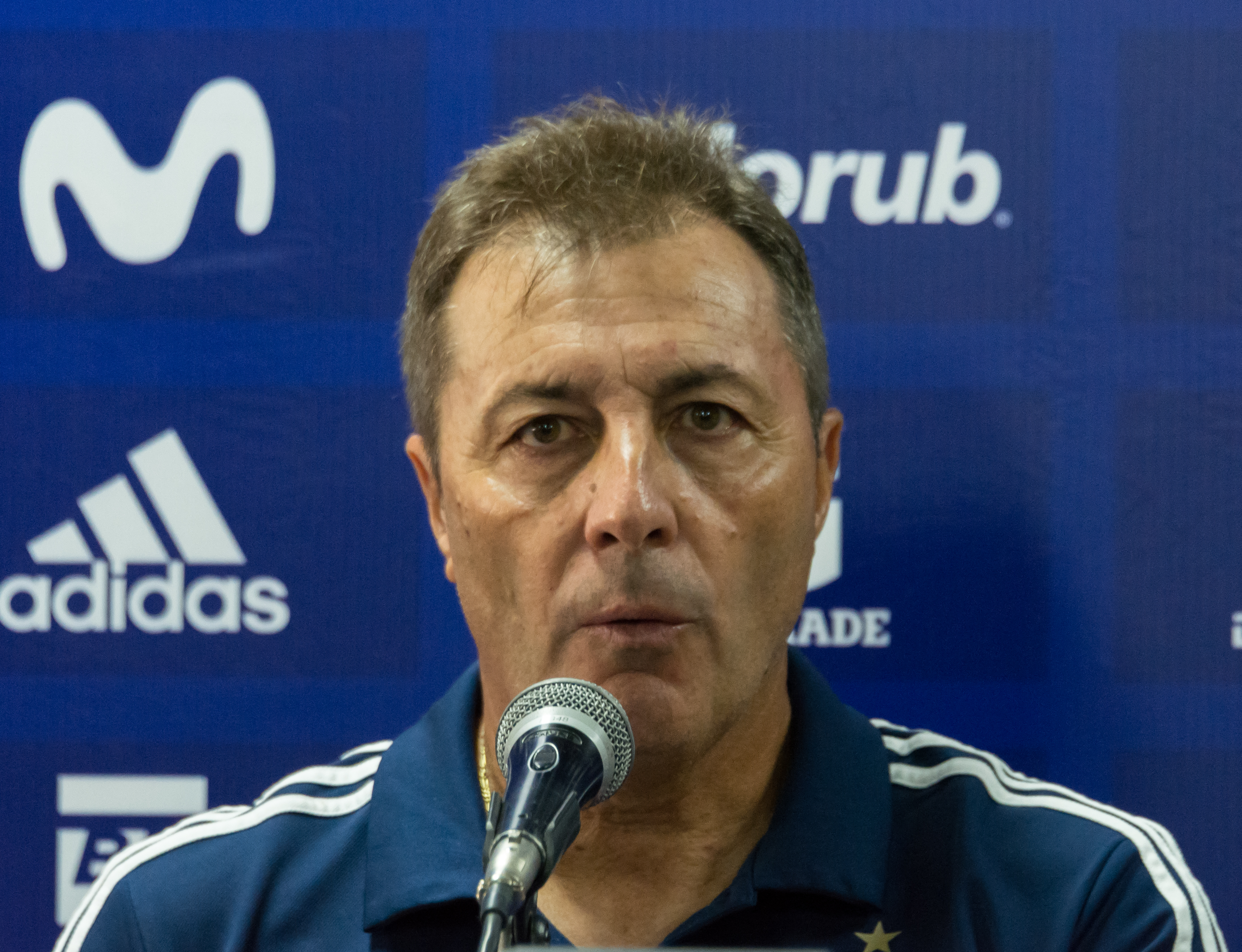
- Kudelka in 2019

Personal information
- Full name: Frank Darío Kudelka
- Date of birth: 12 May 1961 (age 65)
- Place of birth: Freyre, Argentina

Team information
- Current team: Newell's Old Boys (manager)

Managerial career
- Years: Team
- 1987–1989: 9 de Julio Olímpico
- 1989–1994: La Salle Jobson
- 1994–1996: Gimnasia y Esgrima (SF)
- 1996–2004: Unión de Santa Fe
- 2004: Patronato
- 2005–2008: Libertad de Sunchales
- 2008–2010: Boca Unidos
- 2010–2012: Unión de Santa Fe
- 2012–2013: Instituto
- 2013–2014: Huracán
- 2014–2018: Talleres de Córdoba
- 2018–2019: Universidad de Chile
- 2019–2021: Newell's Old Boys
- 2021–2022: Huracán
- 2022–2023: Lanús
- 2024–2025: Huracán
- 2026–: Newell's Old Boys

Frank Darío Kudelka (born 12 May 1961) is an Argentine football manager, currently in charge of Newell's Old Boys.

== Managerial Career ==
Kudelka returned to Huracán in March 2024, signing a one-year contract with the club. On 20 February 2025, Kudelka extended his contract through the end of the 2025 season. Kudelka lead Huracán to the 2025 Torneo Apertura final, losing 1-0 to CA Platense on 1 June 2025. On 18 November 2025, Huracán announced that they had not renewed Kudelka's contract at the end of the 2025 season.

== Personal life ==
Born in Argentina, Kudelka is of Czech descent.

== Managerial statistics ==
As of match played 31 May 2025

Team	From	To	Record							
Team	From	To	G	W	D	L	GF	GA	GD	Win %
Unión	1 July 2002	30 June 2004	38	10	10	18	44	57	−13	26.32
Boca Unidos	1 July 2008	30 May 2010	76	32	23	21	106	82	+24	42.11
Unión	31 May 2010	1 September 2012	82	33	20	29	88	87	+1	40.24
Instituto	20 November 2012	30 September 2013	33	8	15	10	35	37	−2	24.24
Huracán	14 October 2013	3 November 2014	49	19	17	13	53	29	+24	38.78
Talleres	1 January 2015	19 May 2018	112	58	35	19	149	84	+65	51.79
Universidad de Chile	28 May 2018	13 March 2019	29	16	5	8	46	30	+16	55.17
Newell's Old Boys	3 June 2019	13 March 2021	41	16	10	15	57	52	+5	39.02
Huracán	26 March 2021	17 May 2022	46	16	14	16	53	55	−2	34.78
Lanús	25 July 2022	6 September 2023	49	17	13	19	56	58	−2	34.69
Huracán	7 March 2024	present	77	32	28	17	79	55	+24	41.56
Total			629	254	190	185	766	626	+140	40.38
