= Desabato =

Desabato (or Desábato) is a surname. Notable people with the surname include:

- Andrés Desábato (born 1990), Argentine footballer
- Gustavo Domingo Quinteros Desábato (born 1965), Argentine-born football manager
- Leandro Desábato (born 1979), Argentine footballer
- Leandro Luis Desábato (born 1990), Argentine footballer
