= Valentín Gómez =

Argentine footballer

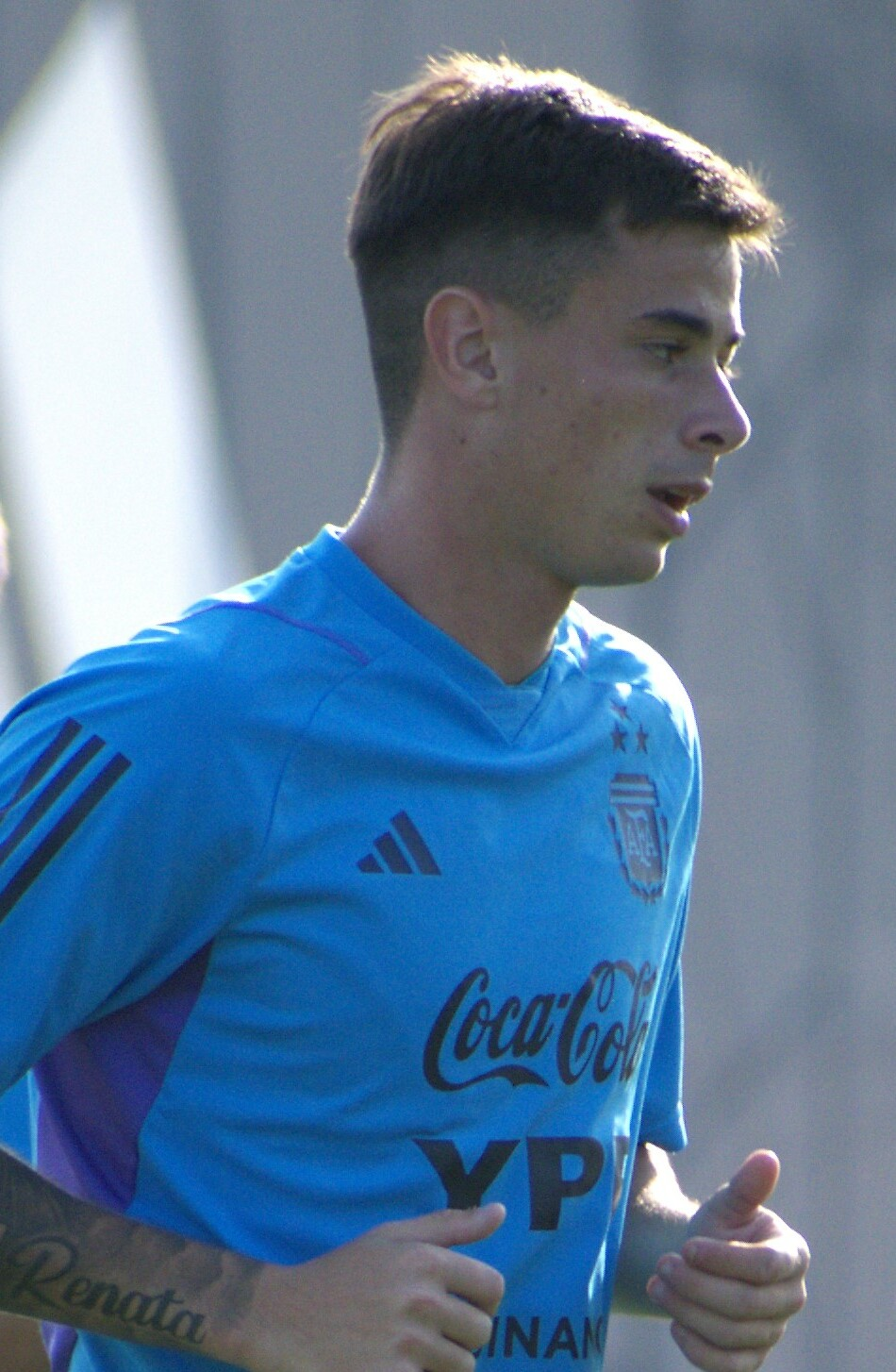
- Gómez in 2023

Personal information
- Full name: Diego Valentín Gómez
- Date of birth: 26 June 2003 (age 23)
- Place of birth: San Miguel, Buenos Aires, Argentina
- Height: 1.80 m (5 ft 11 in)
- Position: Centre-back

Team information
- Current team: Betis
- Number: 16

Youth career
- 2015–2022: Vélez Sarsfield

Senior career*
Years	Team	Apps	(Gls)
2022–2025	Vélez Sarsfield	101	(3)
2025–	Betis	34	(3)

International career^{‡}
2023	Argentina U20	11	(0)
2026–	Argentina	1	(0)
- * Club domestic league appearances and goals as of 18:14, 25 October 2026 (UTC) ‡ National team caps and goals as of 05:47, 30 September 2026 (UTC)

Diego Valentín Gómez (born 26 June 2003) is an Argentine professional footballer who plays as a centre-back for La Liga club Real Betis and the Argentina national team.

== Club career ==
On 26 July 2025, La Liga club Real Betis announced the signing of Gómez from Vélez Sarsfield on a five-year contract.

== International career ==
On 30 September 2026, Gómez made his debut with the Argentina national team in a 4–0 friendly win against Bolivia.

== Career statistics ==
=== Club ===
As of match played 25 October 2026

Appearances and goals by club, season and competition
Club	Season	League			National cup (Note: Includes Copa Argentina, Copa del Rey)		Continental		Other		Total	
Club	Season	Division	Apps	Goals	Apps	Goals	Apps	Goals	Apps	Goals	Apps	Goals
Vélez Sarsfield	2022	Argentine Primera División	27 (Note: Soccerway counts Copa de la Liga Profesional appearances as league appearances.)	1	1	0	10 (Note: Appearances in Copa Libertadores)	0	—		38	1
Vélez Sarsfield	2023	Argentine Primera División	29	1	0	0	—		—		29	1
Vélez Sarsfield	2024	Argentine Primera División	37	1	5	0	—		1 (Note: Appearance in Trofeo de Campeones de la Liga Profesional)	0	43	1
Vélez Sarsfield	2025	Argentine Primera División	8	0	1	0	5	0	1 (Note: Appearance in Supercopa Internacional)	0	15	0
Vélez Sarsfield	Total		101	3	7	0	15	0	2	0	125	3
Betis	2025–26	La Liga	28	1	4	0	8 (Note: Appearances in UEFA Europa League)	0	—		40	1
Betis	2026–27	La Liga	5	1	0	0	1 (Note: Appearance in UEFA Champions League)	0	—		6	1
Betis	Total		33	2	4	0	9	0	0	0	46	2
Career total			133	5	12	0	24	0	2	0	171	5

=== International ===
As of match played 30 September 2026

Appearances and goals by national team and year
National team	Year	Apps	Goals
Argentina	2026	1	0
Total		1	0

== Honours ==
Vélez Sarsfield

- Argentine Primera División: 2024
- Supercopa Internacional: 2024
