= Chico da Costa =

Brazilian footballer

Personal information
- Full name: Francisco da Costa Aragão
- Date of birth: 5 May 1995 (age 31)
- Place of birth: Taquari, Brazil
- Height: 1.85 m (6 ft 1 in)
- Position: Forward

Team information
- Current team: Fortaleza (on loan from Cruzeiro)
- Number: 91

Youth career
- 2007: Grêmio
- Internacional
- CFZ do Rio
- Novo Hamburgo
- 2014–2015: Atlético Paranaense

Senior career*
Years	Team	Apps	(Gls)
2013	Novo Hamburgo	0	(0)
2015–2016	Atlético Paranaense	0	(0)
2015	→ Inter de Lages (loan)	2	(1)
2015	→ Tombense (loan)	2	(0)
2016	→ São José-RS (loan)	11	(1)
2016	→ Operário Ferroviário (loan)	0	(0)
2017	São José-RS	0	(0)
2017	Inter Playa del Carmen	22	(14)
2018	Venados	9	(1)
2019	Inter Playa del Carmen	10	(7)
2019–2020	Atlante	19	(3)
2020–2021	Querétaro	13	(1)
2021	Sol de América	16	(8)
2022–2023	Bolívar	58	(35)
2023	→ Atlético Nacional (loan)	10	(1)
2024–2025	Cerro Porteño	35	(6)
2025	→ Mirassol (loan)	20	(6)
2026–	Cruzeiro	12	(0)
2026–	→ Fortaleza (loan)	1	(0)
- * Club domestic league appearances and goals as of 13 September 2026

Francisco da Costa Aragão (born 5 May 1995), commonly known as Chico da Costa or just Chico, is a Brazilian professional footballer who plays as a forward for Fortaleza, on loan from Cruzeiro.

== Career ==
Born in Taquari, Rio Grande do Sul, Chico played for the youth sides of Grêmio, Internacional, CFZ do Rio and Novo Hamburgo before making his first team debut with the latter in 2013. He joined Atlético Paranaense in 2014, initially for the under-23 team.

In February 2015, Chico was loaned to Inter de Lages after the club began a partnership with Atlético, and made his senior debut on 12 April of that year, scoring the winner in a 2–1 Campeonato Catarinense home win over Chapecoense. Despite being rarely used, he moved to Tombense also in a temporary deal, along with head coach Marcelo Mabilia.

Ahead of the 2016 season, Chico joined São José-RS also on loan, but finished the year at Operário Ferroviário. He returned to Zequinha for the 2017 campaign, now on a permanent deal, but did not feature in any matches for the side.

In 2017, Chico moved abroad for the first time in his career, joining Serie A de México side Inter Playa del Carmen. He scored ten goals in the Apertura tournament for the side, and joined Ascenso MX side Venados in January 2018.

In July 2018, Chico returned to Inter Playa. After scoring seven times in just ten matches, he returned to the second division with Atlante in December of that year. He played his first match with the club on 8 January, in a 2–1 Copa Mexico home loss to Pachuca, and scored his first goal eight days later in a 1–1 draw at Tijuana.

Chico was an important unit of Atlante in the 2020 Clausura, notably scoring a brace in a 2–1 home win over Cafetaleros de Chiapas on 13 February of that year. On 15 June, he agreed to a deal with Querétaro in the Liga MX.

Chico made his debut in the top tier of Mexican football on 22 August 2020, replacing Ángel Sepúlveda at half-time in a 1–0 away loss to Atlas. He scored his first goal for the club against the same opponent the following 18 January, netting the winner in a 1–0 home success.

On 9 June 2021, Chico was presented at Paraguayan Primera División side Sol de América. He was the club's top scorer with eight goals in the 2021 Clausura tournament, but still departed in December.

On 30 December 2021, Chico switched teams and countries again after signing for Club Bolívar. The following 12 July, he renewed his contract with the club, which purchased the remaining 50% of his economic rights from Sol de América.

On 17 November 2022, Chico was presented at the Colombian side Atlético Nacional on a one-year loan deal. After struggling with injuries, his loan was cut short on 26 June 2023, and he subsequently returned to Bolívar where he regained his goalscoring form.

On 5 July 2024, Chico returned to Paraguay after being announced at Cerro Porteño. On 14 July of the following year, he returned to Brazil after nearly nine years, being loaned to Série A side Mirassol.

On 9 January 2026, Cruzeiro announced the signing of Chico on a two-year contract.

== Personal life ==
Chico's father Nilson was also a footballer and a forward. He notably played for and coached teams in the Mato Grosso do Sul.

== Career statistics ==
As of 23 March 2026.

Club	Season	League			State league (Note: Includes Campeonato Catarinense, Campeonato Gaúcho)		Cup (Note: Includes Copa do Brasil, Copa Mexico, Copa de la División Profesional, Copa Paraguay)		Continental		Other		Total	
Club	Season	Division	Apps	Goals	Apps	Goals	Apps	Goals	Apps	Goals	Apps	Goals	Apps	Goals
Novo Hamburgo	2013	Gaúcho	—		0	0	—		—		20 (Note: Thirteen appearances and one goal in Copa Metropolitana, seven appearances in Copa FGF)	1	20	1
Inter de Lages	2015	Série D	—		2	1	—		—		—		2	1
Tombense	2015	Série C	2	0	—		—		—		—		2	0
São José-RS	2016	Série D	4	0	7	1	—		—		—		11	1
Operário Ferroviário	2016	Paranaense	—		—		—		—		6 (Note: Appearance(s) in Taça FPF)	1	6	1
São José-RS	2017	Série D	—		0	0	0	0	—		—		0	0
Inter Playa del Carmen	2016–17	Serie A de México	7	4	—		—		—		—		7	4
Inter Playa del Carmen	2017–18	Serie A de México	15	10	—		—		—		—		15	10
Inter Playa del Carmen	Total		22	14	—		—		—		—		22	14
Venados	2017–18	Ascenso MX	9	1	—		2	1	—		—		11	2
Inter Playa del Carmen	2018–19	Serie A de México	10	7	—		—		—		—		10	7
Atlante	2018–19	Ascenso MX	5	0	—		3	1	—		—		8	1
Atlante	2019–20	Ascenso MX	14	3	—		2	0	—		2 (Note: Appearance(s) in the Liguilla (play-offs))	0	18	3
Atlante	Total		19	3	—		5	1	—		2	0	26	4
Querétaro	2020–21	Liga MX	13	1	—		0	0	—		—		13	1
Sol de América	2021	Paraguayan Primera División	16	8	—		—		—		—		16	8
Bolívar	2022	Bolivian Primera División	36	21	—		—		4 (Note: Appearance(s) in Copa Libertadores)	3	—		40	24
Bolívar	2023	Bolivian Primera División	12	7	—		10	9	4	0	—		26	16
Bolívar	2024	Bolivian Primera División	10	7	—		—		6	5	—		16	12
Bolívar	Total		58	35	—		10	9	14	8	—		82	52
Atlético Nacional (loan)	2023	Categoría Primera A	10	1	—		0	0	2	0	1 (Note: Appearance(s) in Superliga Colombiana)	0	13	1
Cerro Porteño	2024	Paraguayan Primera División	21	6	—		2	2	2 (Note: Appearance(s) in Copa Sudamericana)	0	—		25	8
Cerro Porteño	2025	Paraguayan Primera División	14	0	—		0	0	6	2	—		20	2
Cerro Porteño	Total		45	6	—		2	2	8	2	—		45	10
Mirassol (loan)	2025	Série A	20	6	—		—		—		—		20	6
Cruzeiro	2026	Série A	3	0	5	0	0	0	0	0	—		8	0
Career total			231	82	14	2	19	13	24	10	29	2	307	109

== Honours ==
Novo Hamburgo

- Copa Metropolitana: 2013

Operário Ferroviário

- Taça FPF: 2016

Bolívar

- Bolivian Primera División: 2022

Atlético Nacional

- Superliga Colombiana: 2023

Cruzeiro

- Campeonato Mineiro: 2026

Individual

- Bolivian Primera División top scorer: 2022 Apertura
