= Nicolás Garayalde =

Argentine footballer

Personal information
- Date of birth: 21 July 1999 (age 27)
- Place of birth: Argentina
- Height: 1.82 m (6 ft 0 in)
- Position: Midfielder

Team information
- Current team: Liverpool Montevideo
- Number: 5

Youth career
- Vélez Sarsfield

Senior career*
Years	Team	Apps	(Gls)
2020–2026	Vélez Sarsfield	58	(1)
2024–2025	→ Gimnasia LP (loan)	36	(1)
2026–	Liverpool Montevideo	5	(0)
- * Club domestic league appearances and goals as of 18:26, 13 March 2026 (UTC)

Nicolás Garayalde (born 21 July 1999) is an Argentine professional footballer who plays as a midfielder for Liverpool Montevideo.

== Career ==
Garayalde is a product of the Vélez Sarsfield academy. His breakthrough into first-team football arrived in late-2020 under manager Mauricio Pellegrino, with his senior debut occurring on 1 December during a Copa Sudamericana round of sixteen encounter with Categoría Primera A team Deportivo Cali; he replaced Federico Mancuello with ten minutes left of a 5–1 second leg victory in Colombia.

== Career statistics ==
As of 2 December 2020.

Appearances and goals by club, season and competition
Club	Season	League			Cup		League Cup		Continental		Other		Total	
Club	Season	Division	Apps	Goals	Apps	Goals	Apps	Goals	Apps	Goals	Apps	Goals	Apps	Goals
Vélez Sarsfield	2020–21 (Note: Soccerway counts Copa de la Liga Profesional appearances as league appearances.)	Primera División	0	0	0	0	0	0	1 (Note: Appearance(s) in the Copa Sudamericana)	0	0	0	1	0
Career total			0	0	0	0	0	0	1	0	0	0	1	0
