= Tomás Silva (footballer, born 2003) =

Argentine footballer

Personal information
- Full name: Tomás Ariel Silva
- Date of birth: 8 March 2003 (age 23)
- Place of birth: Buenos Aires, Argentina
- Height: 1.75 m (5 ft 9 in)
- Position: Left-back

Team information
- Current team: Platense
- Number: 3

Youth career
- San Lorenzo de Almagro

Senior career*
| Years | Team | Apps | (Gls) |
| 2022–2026 | San Lorenzo | 9 | (0) |
| 2024 | → Atlanta (loan) | 36 | (0) |
| 2025 | → Platense (loan) | 22 | (0) |
| 2026– | Platense | 27 | (0) |

International career
| 2022 | Argentina U20 | 2 | (0) |
- * Club domestic league appearances and goals as of 17:04, 22 November 2026 (UTC)

Tomás Ariel Silva (born 8 March 2003) is an Argentine professional footballer who plays as a left-back for Platense.

== Club career ==
=== San Lorenzo ===
Silva came through the youth setup at San Lorenzo, signing his first professional contract on 18 February 2022. He made his debut in the Copa de la Liga Profesional in a 4–3 defeat against Defensa y Justicia.

On 13 January 2024, he was loaned to Primera Nacional club Atlanta, where he was a key part of the team starting 36 league matches.

=== Platense ===
On 8 January 2025, he was loaned to Platense. He consolidated himself in the team and helped them to the 2025 Apertura title, starting in the final, a 1–0 win against Huracán, where he was replaced by Edgar Elizalde in the 48th minute.

At the end of the loan, Platense exercised their purchase option and bought 50% of Silva's rights for $400,000, with a contract expiring in December 2028. He made his debut in continental competition in the Copa Libertadores on 9 April 2026 in a 2–0 defeat to Corinthians. On 27 August, he scored his first career goal in the 53rd minute of a Copa Argentina game against Instituto that ended 1–1 before Platense won 3–1 on penalties.

== International career ==
He was called by Javier Mascherano to play for the Argentina national under-20 team in the 2022 South American Games.

== Career statistics ==
As of 4 September 2026

Appearances and goals by club, season and competition
| Club | Season | League | | | Cup (Note: Includes Copa Argentina) | | Continental | | Other | | Total | |
| Club | Season | Division | Goals | Apps | Apps | Goals | Apps | Goals | Apps | Goals | Apps | Goals |
|---|---|---|---|---|---|---|---|---|---|---|---|---|
| San Lorenzo | 2022 | Liga Profesional | 7 | 0 | — | | — | | — | | 7 | 0 |
| San Lorenzo | 2023 | Liga Profesional | 2 | 0 | — | | — | | — | | 2 | 0 |
| San Lorenzo | Total | | 9 | 0 | 0 | 0 | 0 | 0 | 0 | 0 | 9 | 0 |
| Atlanta (loan) | 2024 | Primera Nacional | 36 | 0 | — | | — | | — | | 36 | 0 |
| Platense (loan) | 2025 | Liga Profesional | 22 | 0 | 1 | 0 | — | | 1 (Note: Appearances in Trofeo de Campeones) | 0 | 24 | 0 |
| Platense | 2026 | Liga Profesional | 19 | 0 | 1 | 1 | 7 (Note: Appearances in Copa Libertadores) | 0 | — | | 20 | 1 |
| Platense | Platense Total | | 41 | 0 | 2 | 1 | 7 | 0 | 1 | 0 | 51 | 1 |
| Career total | | | 86 | 0 | 2 | 1 | 7 | 0 | 1 | 0 | 96 | 1 |

== Honours ==
Platense

- Argentine Primera División: 2025 Apertura
