= Gonzalo Goñi =

Argentine footballer

Personal information
- Full name: Marcos Gonzalo Goñi
- Date of birth: 16 August 1998 (age 28)
- Place of birth: Pedro Luro, Argentina
- Height: 1.84 m (6 ft 0 in)
- Position: Centre-back

Team information
- Current team: Platense
- Number: 42

Youth career
- Boca Juniors

Senior career*
Years	Team	Apps	(Gls)
2018–2020	Boca Juniors	1	(0)
2018–2019	→ Agropecuario (loan)	2	(0)
2019–2020	→ Estudiantes BA (loan)	18	(1)
2020–2024	Godoy Cruz	10	(0)
2021–2022	→ Arsenal Sarandí (loan)	49	(3)
2023	→ Central Córdoba SdE (loan)	26	(1)
2024–2025	Barracas Central	32	(0)
2025–	Platense	5	(0)
- * Club domestic league appearances and goals as of 17:32, 19 November 2025 (UTC)

Marcos Gonzalo Goñi (born 16 August 1998) is an Argentine footballer currently playing as a centre-back for Platense.

== Career statistics ==
=== Club ===
As of 18 August 2020.

Club	Season	League			Cup		Continental		Other		Total	
Club	Season	Division	Apps	Goals	Apps	Goals	Apps	Goals	Apps	Goals	Apps	Goals
Boca Juniors	2017–18	Primera División	1	0	0	0	–		0	0	1	0
Boca Juniors	2018–19	Primera División	0	0	0	0	–		0	0	0	0
Boca Juniors	2019–20	Primera División	0	0	0	0	–		0	0	0	0
Boca Juniors	Total		1	0	0	0	0	0	0	0	1	0
Agropecuario (loan)	2018–19	Primera B Nacional	2	0	0	0	–		0	0	2	0
Estudiantes BA (loan)	2019–20	Primera B Nacional	18	1	3 (Note: Appearances in the Copa Argentina)	0	–		0	0	21	1
Godoy Cruz	2020–21	Primera División	0	0	0	0	–		0	0	0	0
Career total			21	1	3	0	0	0	0	0	24	1

== Honours ==
Platense

- Argentine Primera División: 2025 Apertura
