= Maximiliano Rodríguez (Chilean footballer) =

Chilean footballer (born 2000)

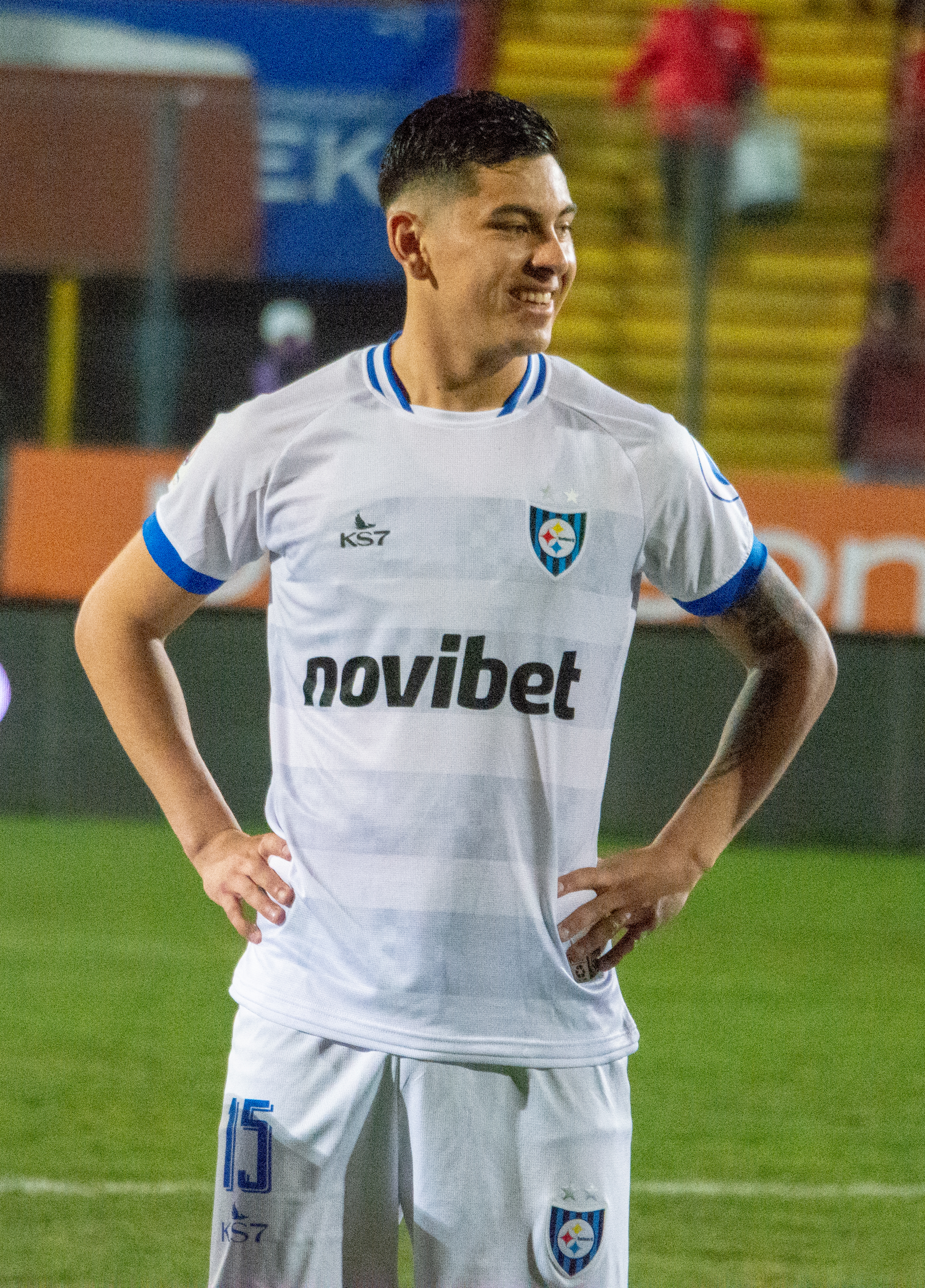
- Rodríguez with Huachipato in 2023

Personal information
- Full name: Maximiliano Alexander Rodríguez Vejar
- Date of birth: 31 May 2000 (age 26)
- Place of birth: Santiago, Chile
- Height: 1.85 m (6 ft 1 in)
- Position: Forward

Team information
- Current team: Huachipato

Youth career
- Colo-Colo
- Cobresal
- Huachipato

Senior career*
Years	Team	Apps	(Gls)
2018–	Huachipato	103	(16)
2025	→ Platense (loan)	14	(1)
- * Club domestic league appearances and goals as of 3 January 2026

Maximiliano Alexander Rodríguez Vejar (born 31 May 2000), usually named Maxi Rodríguez, is a Chilean professional footballer who plays as a forward for Huachipato.

== Club career ==
As a youth player, Rodríguez was with Colo-Colo at under-14 level and Cobresal. Next, he moved to Huachipato and made his professional debut in the Primera División match against San Luis at the minute 93 on 28 September 2018. He scored his first two goals in the match against Ñublense on 17 April 2021.

In January 2025, Rodríguez moved abroad and joined Platense on a one-year loan with an option to buy.

== International career ==
In 2023, Rodríguez was called up to training microcycles of Chile at under-23 level. Subsequently, he received his first call-up to the senior team for the friendly matches in June 2023.

== Honours ==
Platense

- Argentine Primera División: 2025 Apertura
