= Enzo Roldán =

Argentine footballer

Personal information
- Full name: Enzo Martín Roldán
- Date of birth: 8 December 2000 (age 25)
- Place of birth: Villa Mercedes, Argentina
- Height: 1.76 m (5 ft 9 in)
- Position: Midfielder

Team information
- Current team: Unión Santa Fe

Youth career
- Boca Juniors

Senior career*
| Years | Team | Apps | (Gls) |
| 2021–2022 | Boca Juniors | 0 | (0) |
| 2021 | → Unión Santa Fe (loan) | 20 | (0) |
| 2022– | Unión Santa Fe | 87 | (2) |
| 2025 | → Platense (loan) | 7 | (0) |
- * Club domestic league appearances and goals as of 17:25, 19 November 2025 (UTC)

Enzo Martín Roldán (born 8 December 2000) is an Argentine footballer currently playing as a midfielder for Unión de Santa Fe.

== Career statistics ==
=== Club ===
As of 18 August 2021.

| Club | Season | League | | | Cup | | Continental | | Other | | Total | |
| Club | Season | Division | Apps | Goals | Apps | Goals | Apps | Goals | Apps | Goals | Apps | Goals |
|---|---|---|---|---|---|---|---|---|---|---|---|---|
| Boca Juniors | 2021 | Argentine Primera División | 0 | 0 | 0 | 0 | – | | 0 | 0 | 0 | 0 |
| CA Unión (loan) | 2021 | Argentine Primera División | 2 | 0 | 0 | 0 | – | | 0 | 0 | 2 | 0 |
| Career total | | | 2 | 0 | 0 | 0 | 0 | 0 | 0 | 0 | 2 | 0 |

== Honours ==
Platense

- Argentine Primera División: 2025 Apertura
