= Federico Losas =

Argentine footballer

Personal information
- Full name: Federico Gabriel Losas
- Date of birth: 28 March 2002 (age 24)
- Place of birth: Pilar, Buenos Aires, Argentina
- Height: 1.84 m (6 ft 0 in)
- Position: Goalkeeper

Team information
- Current team: Chacarita Juniors

Youth career
- Chacarita Juniors

Senior career*
Years	Team	Apps	(Gls)
2020–	Chacarita Juniors	53	(0)
2025	→ Platense (loan)	5	(0)

International career
2018	Argentina U16	2	(0)
2019	Argentina U17	3	(0)
2017	Argentina U15	1	(0)
- * Club domestic league appearances and goals as of 18:12, 12 March 2026 (UTC)

Federico Gabriel Losas (born 28 March 2002) is an Argentine footballer currently playing as a goalkeeper for Chacarita Juniors.

== Career statistics ==
=== Club ===
As of 14 Aug 2022.

Club	Season	League			Cup		Continental		Other		Total							
Club	Season	Division	Apps	Goals	Apps	Goals	Apps	Goals	Apps	Goals	Apps	Goals						
Club	Season	Chacarita Juniors	2022	Primera Nacional	34	0	0	0	–						0	0	34	0
Club	Season	Career total			34	0	0	0	0	0	0	0	34	0				

Began playing for Chacarita Juniors at age 11.

South America U15 Winner San Juan Argentina Nov 2017. Four Nations U16 Runner Up Mexico City Oct 2018. South America U17 Winner Lima Apr 2019. Granatkin Memorial U17 Winner Saint Petersburg Jun 2019. Played for Argentina at U17 World Cup Brazil 2019.

Played more than 50 international cups with Argentina U15, U16 and U17.

On April 19, 2021, he made his first team debut with a cleansheet in a host game vs Belgrano (2–0). He became the youngest goalkeeper playing in Primera Nacional, keeping this record for 14 months. He was also the youngest goalkeeper playing a full time match including the two first categories in Argentine football.
