= Juan Pablo Cozzani =

Argentine footballer

Personal information
- Full name: Juan Pablo Cozzani
- Date of birth: 9 October 1998 (age 28)
- Place of birth: Guaymallén, Mendoza, Argentina
- Height: 1.84 m (6 ft 0 in)
- Position: Goalkeeper

Team information
- Current team: Platense
- Number: 31

Youth career
- Gimnasia Mendoza
- Talleres
- Lanús

Senior career*
Years	Team	Apps	(Gls)
2018–2021	Lanús	0	(0)
2020–2021	→ San Martín SJ (loan)	36	(0)
2022–2024	Deportivo Maipú	69	(0)
2024	→ Platense (loan)	40	(0)
2025–	Platense	40	(0)
2025–2026	→ Al-Kholood (loan)	32	(0)

International career
2019–2020	Argentina U23	2	(0)
- * Club domestic league appearances and goals as of 17:17, 22 November 2026 (UTC)

Juan Pablo Cozzani (born 9 October 1998) is an Argentine professional footballer who plays as a goalkeeper for Platense.

== Club career ==
Cozzani played for the youth teams of Gimnasia Mendoza and Talleres before joining Lanús, where he was a backup goalkeeper.

In August 2020, he was loaned to Primera Nacional club San Martín SJ. He made his professional club debut on 29 November in a 1–0 win against Nueva Chicago.

In 2022, he joined Deportivo Maipú as a free agent. He quickly established himself as the starting goalkeeper. On 2 December 2023, he started the Primera Nacional promotion final against Deportivo Riestra, which Maipú lost 1–0.

On 5 January 2024, he was loaned to Liga Profesional club Platense. He made his Liga Profesional debut on 27 January, keeping a clean sheet as Platense drew 0–0 with Boca Juniors. On 28 October, Platense confirmed that they exercised their purchase option to sign Cozzani permanently, signing him to a contract until the end of 2028. He helped his club to the first title in their history on 1 June 2025, keeping a clean sheet in 1–0 win against Huracán to win the Torneo Apertura.

On 19 August 2025, his contract was extended to 2029 and he was loaned to Saudi Pro League club Al-Kholood. He returned to Platense after the loan ended and subsequently made his debut in continental competition on 13 August 2026 in a 1–1 draw against Coquimbo Unido in the Copa Libertadores round of 16. In the second leg, after a 0–0 draw, he scored the 6th penalty of the shootout and saved Coquimbo Unido's 7th to send Platense through to the next round.

== International career ==
In 2019, he was called up by Fernando Batista to play for the Argentina national under-23 team in the 2020 CONMEBOL Pre-Olympic Tournament, which Argentina won.

== Career statistics ==
As of 25 September 2026

Appearances and goals by club, season and competition
Club	Season	League			Cup (Note: Includes Copa Argentina and King's Cup)		Continental		Other		Total	
Club	Season	Division	Apps	Goals	Apps	Goals	Apps	Goals	Apps	Goals	Apps	Goals
Lanús	2018–19	Liga Profesional	0	0	0	0	—		—		0	0
Lanús	2019–20	Liga Profesional	0	0	0	0	—		—		0	0
San Martín SJ (loan)	2020	Primera Nacional	9	0	1	0	—		—		10	0
San Martín SJ (loan)	2021	Primera Nacional	27	0	0	0	—		—		27	0
San Martín SJ (loan)	Total		36	0	1	0	0	0	0	0	37	0
Deportivo Maipú	2022	Primera Nacional	30	0	0	0	—		—		30	0
Deportivo Maipú	2023	Primera Nacional	39	0	0	0	—		—		39	0
Deportivo Maipú	Total		69	0	0	0	0	0	0	0	69	0
Platense (loan)	2024	Liga Profesional	40	0	1	0	—		—		41	0
Platense	2025	Liga Profesional	25	0	1	0	—		—		26	0
Platense	2026	Liga Profesional	9	0	1	0	4 (Note: Appearances in Copa Libertadores)	0	—		14	0
Platense	Platense Total		74	0	3	0	4	0	0	0	81	0
Al-Kholood (loan)	2025–26	Saudi Pro League	32	0	4	0	—		—		36	0
Career total			211	0	8	0	4	0	0	0	223	0

== Honours ==
=== Club ===
Platense

- Argentine Primera División: 2025 Apertura

=== International ===
Argentina Olympic

- Pre-Olympic Tournament: 2020
