= Ignacio Schor =

Argentine professional footballer

Personal information
- Date of birth: 4 August 2000 (age 26)
- Place of birth: Buenos Aires, Argentina
- Height: 1.83 m (6 ft 0 in)
- Position: Winger

Team information
- Current team: O'Higgins
- Number: 25

Youth career
- River Plate
- San Lorenzo
- 2015–2020: Platense

Senior career*
Years	Team	Apps	(Gls)
2020–2025	Platense	119	(5)
2023–2024	→ Newell's Old Boys (loan)	19	(0)
2026	Ceuta	6	(0)
2026–	O'Higgins	0	(0)
- * Club domestic league appearances and goals as of 9 June 2026

Ignacio Schor (born 4 August 2000) is an Argentine professional footballer who plays as a winger for Chilean club O'Higgins.

== Career ==
Prior to his departure to Platense in 2015, Schor spent three years at River Plate and six months at San Lorenzo. He signed his first professional contract on 13 November 2020. Schor made his senior debut under manager Juan Manuel Llop on 28 November in a Primera Nacional win away to Atlanta, with the midfielder winning a penalty that Joaquín Susvielles would convert. In his second appearance, on 5 December against Deportivo Morón, Schor scored his first goal. He made eight further appearances in 2020, which the club ended with promotion. He made his Primera División bow versus Argentinos Juniors on 21 February.

In the second half of 2026, Schor moved to Chile and signed with O'Higgins on a deal until December 2027.

== Career statistics ==
As of 23 February 2021.

Appearances and goals by club, season and competition
Club	Season	League			Cup		League Cup		Continental		Other		Total	
Club	Season	Division	Apps	Goals	Apps	Goals	Apps	Goals	Apps	Goals	Apps	Goals	Apps	Goals
Platense	2020	Primera Nacional	10	1	0	0	—		—		0	0	10	1
Platense	2021 (Note: Soccerway counts Copa de la Liga Profesional appearances as league appearances.)	Primera División	1	0	0	0	—		—		0	0	1	0
Career total			11	1	0	0	—		—		0	0	11	1

== Honours ==
Platense

- Argentine Primera División: 2025 Apertura
