= Santiago Toloza =

Argentine footballer

Personal information
- Full name: Santiago Federico Toloza
- Date of birth: 28 October 2002 (age 24)
- Place of birth: Morteros, Argentina
- Height: 1.71 m (5 ft 7 in)
- Position: Midfielder

Team information
- Current team: O'Higgins
- Number: 7

Youth career
- –2015: 9 de Julio Morteros
- 2015–2022: Talleres

Senior career*
Years	Team	Apps	(Gls)
2022–2023	Talleres	12	(0)
2023	→ Arsenal de Sarandí (loan)	25	(5)
2023–2025	Independiente	16	(0)
2025	Platense	8	(0)
2026	Defensa y Justicia	1	(0)
2026–	O'Higgins	0	(0)

International career
2018	Argentina U17	1	(0)
- * Club domestic league appearances and goals as of 17:44, 10 May 2026 (UTC)

Santiago Federico Toloza (born 28 October 2002, Morteros) is an Argentine footballer who plays as an attacking midfielder for Chilean Liga de Primera club O'Higgins.

== Early life ==
From Morteros, Córdoba, he played his youth team football at 9 de Julio de Morteros until 2015 when he joined Talleres de Córdoba. In 2018 he won a youth league with the club.

== Career ==
=== Talleres de Córdoba ===
In 2020 he made his first preseason training with the first team squad of Talleres de Córdoba. The same year, 2020, he signed his first professional contract with Talleres. Toloza made his senior debut in the first team of Talleres, in a Copa Argentina match against Güemes in the Santiago del Estero on 17 March 2022. He came on as a substitute 32 minutes into the second half in place of Federico Girotti during a 4–0 win for his side. Tolaza made his Copa Libertadores debut against Sporting Cristal on 27 April 2022 at the Estadio Mario Alberto Kempes, shortly before his first senior league start against Atletico Tucuman on 30 April, 2022. In 2022 Toloza made 16 appearances in all competitions for Talleres de Córdoba.

=== Arsenal de Sarandi ===
On 7 January 2023, Arsenal de Sarandi confirmed the loan signing of Toloza on a one-year deal. Toloza scored his first senior league goal on 4 February 2023 for Arsenal de Sarandí against Estudiantes.

=== Independiente ===
On 31 August 2023, Santiago signed a contract with Independiente, that runs through the end of 2026.

=== Platense ===
On 22 January 2025, Toloza joined Platense after rescinding his contract with Independiente, signing a one-year deal with an option for a three-year extension.

=== Defensa y Justicia ===
On 11 March 2026, he signed a two-year contract with Defensa y Justicia.

=== O'Higgins ===
In August 2026, Toloza moved to Chile and joined O'Higgins on a deal until the end of 2028.

== International career ==
In September 2018 he was called up to the Argentine under-17 squad. He played on 4 October 2018 against the United States under 17 team, in a 2–1 win for his country. Prior to this, Toloza had been called up to Argentine age group football teams at under-15 and under-16 level.

== Honours ==
Platense

- Argentine Primera División: 2025 Apertura
