= Rodrigo Herrera =

Argentine professional footballer

Personal information
- Full name: Rodrigo Ezequiel Herrera
- Date of birth: 2 August 2000 (age 26)
- Place of birth: Florencio Varela, Argentina
- Height: 1.81 m (5 ft 11 in)
- Position: Defensive midfielder

Team information
- Current team: Newell's Old Boys
- Number: 26

Youth career
- Defensa y Justicia

Senior career*
Years	Team	Apps	(Gls)
2020–2026	Defensa y Justicia	10	(0)
2021–2022	→ San Martín T. (loan)	55	(1)
2023–2024	→ Barracas Central (loan)	61	(0)
2025	→ Platense (loan)	29	(0)
2026–	Newell's Old Boys	14	(0)
- * Club domestic league appearances and goals as of 17:32, 8 May 2026 (UTC)

Rodrigo Ezequiel Herrera (born 2 August 2000) is an Argentine professional footballer who plays as a defensive midfielder for Newell's Old Boys.

== Career ==
Herrera is a product of the Defensa y Justicia youth system. He made the move into their first-team squad in December 2020 under manager Hernán Crespo, initially appearing on the substitute's bench for a Copa Sudamericana round of sixteen second leg victory away to Vasco da Gama on 3 December. On 6 December, Herrera made his senior debut in a defeat away to Independiente in the Copa de la Liga Profesional first group stage; featuring for the full duration at the Estadio Libertadores de América.

== Career statistics ==
As of 7 December 2020.

Appearances and goals by club, season and competition
Club	Season	League			Cup		League Cup		Continental		Other		Total	
Club	Season	Division	Apps	Goals	Apps	Goals	Apps	Goals	Apps	Goals	Apps	Goals	Apps	Goals
Defensa y Justicia	2020–21 (Note: Soccerway counts Copa de la Liga Profesional appearances as league appearances.)	Primera División	1	0	0	0	0	0	0	0	0	0	1	0
Career total			1	0	0	0	0	0	0	0	0	0	1	0

== Honours ==
Platense

- Argentine Primera División: 2025 Apertura
