= Ronaldo Martínez (footballer) =

Paraguayan footballer (born 1996)

Personal information
- Full name: Ronaldo Iván Martínez Rolón
- Date of birth: 25 April 1996 (age 30)
- Place of birth: Eusebio Ayala, Paraguay
- Height: 1.78 m (5 ft 10 in)
- Position: Forward

Team information
- Current team: Vélez Sarsfield (on loan from Talleres)
- Number: 77

Youth career
- 2010–2015: Cerro Porteño

Senior career*
Years	Team	Apps	(Gls)
2015–2021	Cerro Porteño	14	(4)
2018	→ Deportivo Capiatá (loan)	7	(3)
2019	→ Central Norte (loan)	13	(8)
2021–2022	The Strongest	16	(3)
2022–2023	Resistencia	40	(13)
2023–2026	Platense	97	(22)
2026–	Talleres	22	(4)
2026–	→ Vélez Sarsfield (loan)	7	(9)

International career^{‡}
2013	Paraguay U17	8	(1)
2025–	Paraguay	3	(0)
- * Club domestic league appearances and goals as of 16:02, 6 September 2026 (UTC) ‡ National team caps and goals as of 23:21, 10 October 2025 (UTC)

Ronaldo Iván Martínez Rolón (born 25 April 1996) is a Paraguayan professional football player who plays as a forward for Argentine Primera División club Vélez Sarsfield, on loan from Talleres, and the Paraguay national team.

== Career ==
Martínez is a product of the youth academy of the Paraguayan club Cerro Porteño and began his senior career with them in 2015. He began his senior career on loan with Deportivo Capiatá in 2018. In 2019, he went on loan to the Torneo Federal A club Central Norte. On 19 April 2022, he moved to the Bolivian Primera División club The Strongest.

On 5 January 2023, Martínez transferred to the Argentine Primera División club Platense on a 1-year contract. On 18 December 2023, he extended his contract with Platense until December 2026. He was an important part of the squad that won the 2025 Apertura, the club's first official title in more than 120 years.

== International career ==
Martínez played for the Paraguay U17s at the 2013 South American U-17 Championship. He was first called up to the Paraguay national team for a set of 2026 FIFA World Cup qualification matches in September 2025.

== Personal life ==
Martínez is named after the Brazilian footballer Ronaldo, and his middle name Iván comes from the Chilean footballer Iván Zamorano.

== Career statistics ==
=== International ===
As of match played 10 October 2025

Appearances and goals by national team and year
National team	Year	Apps	Goals
Paraguay	2025	3	0
Total		3	0

== Honours ==
Cerro Porteño

- Paraguayan Primera División: 2015, 2017, 2020

Platense

- Argentine Primera División: 2025 Apertura

Individual

- Argentine Primera División Top Scorer: 2025 Clausura
