= Estadio Ciudad de Vicente López =

Football stadium in Florida, Argentina

Coordinates: 34°32′25″S 58°28′54″W

City of Vicente López Stadium
- Estadio Ciudad de Vicente López
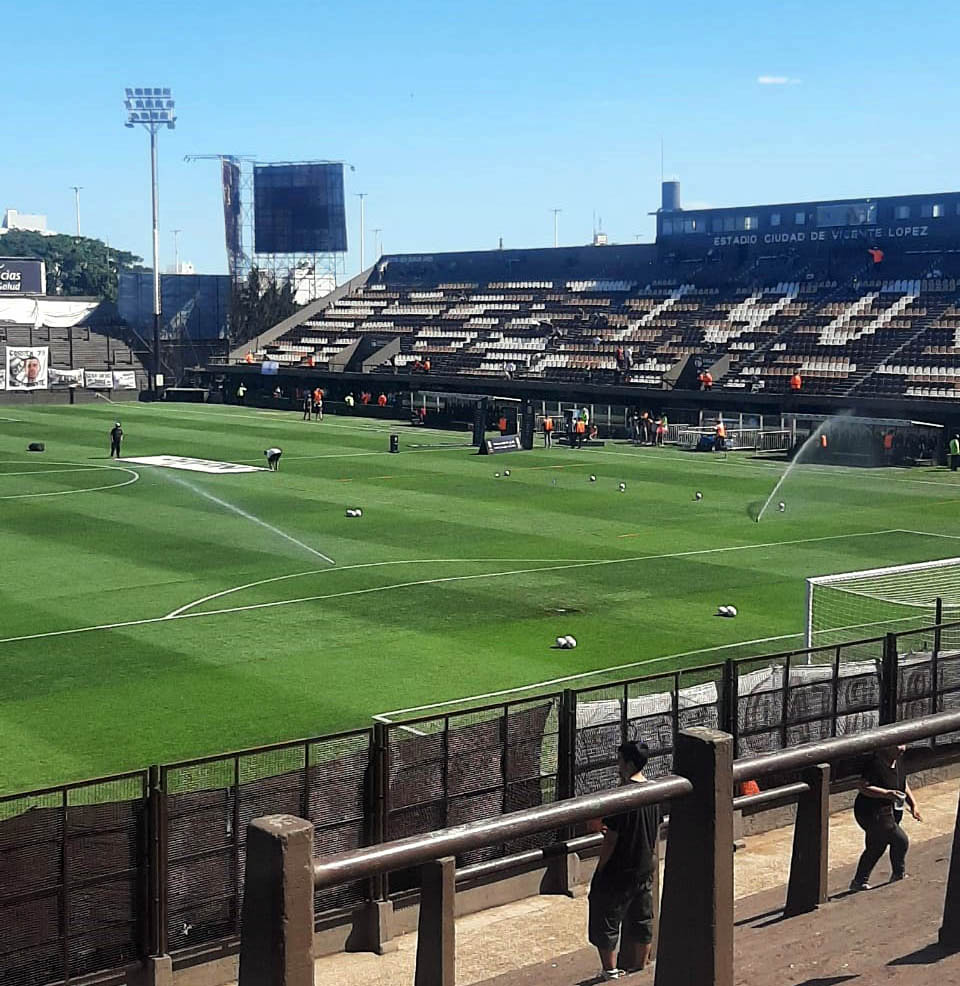
- Field and grandstand of Platense
- Interactive map of City of Vicente López Stadium
- Address: Juan Zufriategui 2021; Florida; Argentina
- Owner: Club Atlético Platense
- Capacity: 28,530
- Type: Stadium
- Surface: Grass
- Field size: 105 x 70

Construction
- Opened: 22 June 1979; 47 years ago
- Expanded: 1994

Website
- cap.org.ar/estadio

The Estadio Ciudad de Vicente López is a stadium located in the neighborhood of Florida in Vicente López Partido of Greater Buenos Aires. Owned and operated by Club Atlético Platense, the stadium was built in 1979, and has a capacity of 28,530 spectators. The stadium is mainly used for football matches.

== History ==
Platense had its first stadium on Posadas street in the Retiro neighborhood, built on a land rented to the Municipality of Buenos Aires. It had been built in 1907 and the club used the venue until 1911, when Platense moved to Manuela Pedraza and Blandengues streets in the neighborhood of Belgrano. In 1917 the club rented a land on Manuela Pedraza and Crámer streets in the Núñez district, where the football team (promoted to Argentine Primera División in 1912) played their home matches until 1971. The first match in Saavedra was held on July 9, 1917, when Platense beat Rosarian club Provincial 1–0.

By 1922, the stadium included an official grandstand (with roof), with seven rooms on the main floor, and one tennis court among other facilities. The stadium was refurbished to expand its capacity, in 1932 and 1939. In February 1941, Platense opened a velodrome, placed next to the stadium. For years, it was the only velodrome in the city of Buenos Aires. In the centre of the arena, the basketball team of the club played their home games.

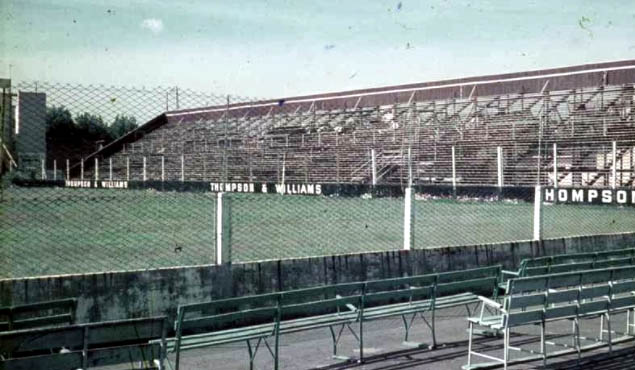
Former stadium of Platense on Manuela Pedraza and Crámer, Núñez district. It was the club's home venue until 1971

The club acquired land in Vicente López Partido to build a stadium there in 1947. Three years later, C.A. Platense obtained a loan to build a stadium made of concrete, inspired by Club Atlético Huracán's venue, Estadio Tomás Adolfo Ducó. The stadium would host 60,000 spectators. Nevertheless, the project was dismissed in 1955, when after the Revolución Libertadora, a military government took the power in Argentina. In 1965, the club refurbished the stadium, expanding the field dimensions to 110 x 70 m, and demolishing the velodrome. In 1971, the club was in a deep financial crisis and had to leave the land on Manuela Pedraza and Crámer. The last match played there was on September 26, when Platense beat Newell's Old Boys 2–0.

In 1974 architect Haedo led works to build a new venue in the Florida district of Vicente López Partido, on the other side of Avenida General Paz. The stadium was inaugurated on July 22, 1979, when Platense played v Gimnasia y Esgrima LP. The visitor team's grandstand was finished one year later while the lighting system was placed in September 1982.

In 1994, the stadium was refurbished, expanding its capacity from 18,000 to 28,530. Works included the construction of two new concrete grandstands, named "Julio Cozzi" and "Roberto Goyeneche", honoring one of the most notable goalkeepers in the club's history and Platense's most recognised supporter, respectively. Works concluded in 1998.
