= Juan Ignacio Saborido =

Argentine footballer

Personal information
- Full name: Juan Ignacio Saborido
- Date of birth: 25 April 1998 (age 28)
- Place of birth: La Plata, Argentina
- Height: 1.78 m (5 ft 10 in)
- Position: Centre-back

Team information
- Current team: Platense
- Number: 25

Youth career
- Estudiantes
- Villa San Carlos

Senior career*
Years	Team	Apps	(Gls)
2019–2024	Villa San Carlos	86	(3)
2023	→ General Caballero JLM (loan)	38	(2)
2024–	Platense	80	(1)
- * Club domestic league appearances and goals as of 17:16, 22 November 2026 (UTC)

Juan Ignacio Saborido (born 25 April 1998) is an Argentine professional footballer who plays as a centre-back for Platense.

== Career ==
=== Villa San Carlos ===
Saborido came through the youth program at Estudiantes de La Plata before joining Villa San Carlos, where he made his debut on 6 October 2019 in a 1–0 loss to Talleres RdE in the Primera B Metropolitana. He scored his first goal for the club in a 2–1 win against Colegiales on 22 February 2020.

==== Loan to General Caballero JLM ====
On December 17 2022, he was loaned to Paraguayan Primera División side General Caballero JLM for the 2023 season, after his contract at Villa San Carlos was extended until the end of 2024. He featured 38 times for General Caballero in the league, scoring against Guaraní and Sportivo Ameliano.

=== Platense ===
On 9 January 2024, he signed permanently for Liga Profesional club Platense until December 2026. After initially receiving a lack of minutes, he established himself in the first team and started every game in the 2025 Apertura playoffs, where Platense won the title. He signed a new contract after the tournament on 23 September, signing until the end of 2027.

== Career statistics ==
As of 2 March 2026

Appearances and goals by club, season and competition
Club	Season	League			Cup (Note: Includes Copa Argentina, Copa Paraguay)		Continental		Other		Total	
Club	Season	Division	Goals	Apps	Apps	Goals	Apps	Goals	Apps	Goals	Apps	Goals
Villa San Carlos	2019–20	Primera B Metropolitana	18	1	3	0	—		—		21	1
Villa San Carlos	2021	Primera B Metropolitana	32	0	—		—		—		32	0
Villa San Carlos	2022	Primera B Metropolitana	36	2	—		—		—		36	2
Villa San Carlos	Total		86	3	3	0	0	0	0	0	89	3
General Caballero JLM (loan)	2023	APF División de Honor	38	2	1	0	—		—		39	2
Platense	2024	Liga Profesional	23	1	2	0	—		—		25	1
Platense	2025	Liga Profesional	33	0	1	0	—		1 (Note: Appearances in Trofeo de Campeones de la Liga Profesional)	0	35	0
Platense	2026	Liga Profesional	7	0	0	0	—		—		7	0
Platense	Total		63	1	3	0	0	0	1	0	67	1
Career total			187	6	7	0	0	0	1	0	195	6

== Honours ==
Platense

- Argentine Primera División: 2025 Apertura
