= Edgar Elizalde =

Uruguayan footballer (born 2000)

Personal information
- Full name: Edgar Joel Elizalde Ferreira
- Date of birth: 27 February 2000 (age 26)
- Place of birth: Casupá, Uruguay
- Height: 1.82 m (6 ft 0 in)
- Position: Defender

Team information
- Current team: Millonarios
- Number: 4

Youth career
- 2014–2017: Montevideo Wanderers

Senior career*
Years	Team	Apps	(Gls)
2017–2022	Pescara	3	(0)
2019–2020	→ Catanzaro (loan)	3	(0)
2021	→ Juve Stabia (loan)	12	(0)
2021–2022	→ Peñarol (loan)	20	(0)
2022–2024	Independiente	32	(1)
2024–2025	Liverpool Montevideo	11	(1)
2025–2026	Platense	10	(0)
2026–	Millonarios	1	(0)

International career
2015	Uruguay U15	18	(0)
2016–2017	Uruguay U17	24	(2)
2017	Uruguay U18	6	(0)
2018–2019	Uruguay U20	17	(0)
- * Club domestic league appearances and goals as of 17:47, 12 March 2026 (UTC)

Edgar Joel Elizalde Ferreira (born 27 February 2000) is a Uruguayan professional footballer who plays as a defender for Millonarios.

== Club career ==
He made his Serie B debut for Pescara on 28 October 2017 in a game against Brescia. On 19 August 2019, he joined Catanzaro on loan. On 29 January 2020, Pescara recalled him from loan.

On 22 January 2021, Elizalde was loaned to Juve Stabia in Serie C. On 6 August 2021, he joined Peñarol on loan.

On 7 July 2022, Argentine club Independiente signed Elizalde on permanent basis on a contract until December 2025.

== Career statistics ==
=== Club ===
As of match played 5 March 2022

Appearances and goals by club, season and competition
Club	Season	League			National Cup		Continental		Other		Total	
Club	Season	Division	Apps	Goals	Apps	Goals	Apps	Goals	Apps	Goals	Apps	Goals
Pescara	2017–18	Serie B	2	0	1	0	—		—		1	0
Pescara	2018–19	Serie B	0	0	1	0	—		—		1	0
Pescara	2019–20	Serie B	1	0	0	0	—		—		1	0
Pescara	2020–21	Serie B	0	0	1	0	—		—		1	0
Pescara	Total		3	0	3	0	0	0	0	0	4	0
Catanzaro (loan)	2019–20	Serie C	3	0	—		—		—		3	0
Juve Stabia (loan)	2020–21	Serie C	12	0	—		—		2 (Note: Appearance(s) in Promotion Playoffs)	0	14	0
Peñarol (loan)	2021	Primera División	8	0	—		0	0	—		8	0
Peñarol (loan)	2022	Primera División	5	0	—		0	0	1 (Note: Appearance(s) in Supercopa Uruguaya)	0	6	0
Peñarol (loan)	Total		13	0	0	0	0	0	1	0	14	0
Career total			31	0	3	0	0	0	3	0	35	0

== Honours ==
Peñarol

- Uruguayan Primera División: 2021
- Supercopa Uruguaya: 2022

Platense

- Argentine Primera División: 2025 Apertura
