= Augusto Lotti =

Argentine footballer

Personal information
- Full name: Augusto Diego Lotti
- Date of birth: 10 June 1996 (age 30)
- Place of birth: Salto, Argentina
- Height: 1.79 m (5 ft 10 1/2 in)
- Position: Forward

Team information
- Current team: Club Atlético Platense
- Number: 21

Youth career
- 2002–2004: Cardenal Spínola
- 12 de Octubre Olivos
- Boca Juniors
- 2012–2015: Racing Club

Senior career*
Years	Team	Apps	(Gls)
2015–2019	Racing	0	(0)
2015–2017	→ Wohlen (loan)	23	(2)
2018–2019	→ Unión Santa Fe (loan)	10	(1)
2019–2023	Tucumán	100	(20)
2023–2024	Cruz Azul	19	(3)
2023–2024	→ Lanús (loan)	28	(2)
2024–	Platense	57	(3)
- * Club domestic league appearances and goals as of 17:14, 22 November 2026 (UTC)

Augusto Diego Lotti (born 10 June 1996) is an Argentine professional footballer who plays as a forward for Argentine Primera División club Platense.

== Career ==
Lotti, who is of Italian descent, began his youth career in Argentina with Cardenal Spínola between 2002 and 2004, before leaving for 12 de Octubre Olivos and subsequently Boca Juniors. He left the latter in December 2012, signing for Racing Club. In 2015, Lotti departed to Swiss football on loan by joining Challenge League side Wohlen. He featured in fifteen fixtures in the 2015–16 season, which included his senior bow on 8 November versus Biel-Bienne. His first goal came during a 2–2 draw with Neuchâtel Xamax in April 2016. Lotti stayed for 2016–17, netting against Le Mont, before returning to his homeland.

Back with Racing Club, he was on the bench for a Primera División fixture with Rosario Central in April 2018, which preceded his debut in the Copa Argentina versus Sarmiento in May. On 2 July 2018, Lotti was loaned to fellow Primera División side Unión Santa Fe. Sarmiento were again his debut opponents in the cup, with the forward being substituted on for the final minutes of a defeat to the Torneo Federal A team. After a brace against ex-club Boca Juniors in a friendly in January 2019, his first professional league appearance arrived on 23 January at the Estadio Monumental Antonio Vespucio Liberti against River Plate.

In March 2019, Lotti scored on his Copa Sudamericana bow versus Independiente del Valle; as Unión Santa Fe won 2–0.

== Career statistics ==
As of 21 March 2019

Club statistics
Club	Season	League			Cup		Continental		Other		Total	
Club	Season	Division	Apps	Goals	Apps	Goals	Apps	Goals	Apps	Goals	Apps	Goals
Racing Club	2015	Primera División	0	0	0	0	0	0	0	0	0	0
Racing Club	2016	Primera División	0	0	0	0	0	0	0	0	0	0
Racing Club	2016–17	Primera División	0	0	0	0	0	0	0	0	0	0
Racing Club	2017–18	Primera División	0	0	1	0	0	0	0	0	1	0
Racing Club	2018–19	Primera División	0	0	0	0	0	0	0	0	0	0
Racing Club	Total		0	0	1	0	0	0	0	0	1	0
Wohlen (loan)	2015–16	Challenge League	15	1	—		—		—		15	1
Wohlen (loan)	2016–17	Challenge League	8	1	1	0	—		—		9	1
Wohlen (loan)	Total		23	2	1	0	—		—		24	2
Unión Santa Fe (loan)	2018–19	Primera División	10	1	1	0	1 (Note: Appearance(s) in the Copa Sudamericana)	1	—		12	2
Career total			33	3	3	0	1	1	0	0	37	4

== Honours ==
Platense

- Argentine Primera División: 2025 Apertura
