= Franco Zapiola =

Argentine footballer

Personal information
- Full name: Franco Zapiola Yamartino
- Date of birth: 19 February 2001 (age 25)
- Place of birth: Magdalena, Argentina
- Height: 1.73 m (5 ft 8 in)
- Position: Midfielder

Team information
- Current team: Platense
- Number: 10

Youth career
- Estudiantes

Senior career*
Years	Team	Apps	(Gls)
2021–2024	Estudiantes	77	(5)
2024–	Platense	66	(5)
- * Club domestic league appearances and goals as of 17:08, 22 November 2026 (UTC)

Franco Zapiola Yamartino (born 19 February 2001) is an Argentine footballer who plays as a midfielder for Platense.

== Career ==
Born in Magdalena, Buenos Aires, Zapiola was an Estudiantes de La Plata youth graduate. He made his first team – and Primera División – debut on 17 July 2021, coming on as a late substitute for Juan Sánchez Miño in a 3–0 away win over Sarmiento.

Zapiola subsequently established himself as a first team regular, and scored his first senior goal on 2 April 2022, netting a last-minute equalizer in a 3–3 away draw against Godoy Cruz; six days later, he scored his team's fourth in a 4–1 Copa Libertadores home routing of Vélez Sarsfield.

In October 2022, Zapiola extended this contract until the end of 2024 having made over 50 appearances for the club in the league and cups, including his debut in the Copa Libertadores.

On 18 July 2024, Zapiola joined Platense for a fee of $500,000, signing a three-year contract.

== Career statistics ==
As of 12 December 2023.

Club statistics
Club	Season	League			Cup (Note: Includes the Copa Argentina)		Continental (Note: Includes the Copa Libertadores and Copa Sudamericana)		Other		Total	
Club	Season	Division	Apps	Goals	Apps	Goals	Apps	Goals	Apps	Goals	Apps	Goals
Estudiantes	2021	Primera División	19 (Note: Soccerway counts Copa de la Liga Profesional appearances as league appearances.)	0	0	0	—		—		19	0
Estudiantes	2022	Primera División	32	4	2	0	10	2	—		46	6
Estudiantes	2023	Primera División	15	1	4	0	6	0	—		25	1
Career total			66	5	6	0	16	2	0	0	88	7

== Honours ==
Estudiantes

- Copa Argentina: 2023
- Copa de la Liga Profesional: 2024

Platense

- Argentine Primera División: 2025 Apertura
