= Ignacio Vázquez (footballer, born 1997) =

Argentine footballer

Personal information
- Date of birth: 15 June 1997 (age 29)
- Place of birth: Hurlingham, Argentina
- Height: 1.88 m (6 ft 2 in)
- Position: Centre-back

Team information
- Current team: Platense
- Number: 13

Youth career
- All Boys

Senior career*
Years	Team	Apps	(Gls)
2017–2024	All Boys	79	(8)
2019–2020	→ Belgrano (loan)	14	(0)
2020	→ San Luis (loan)	13	(1)
2021	→ Cerro Largo (loan)	13	(1)
2023	→ Platense (loan)	39	(1)
2024–	Platense	88	(3)
- * Club domestic league appearances and goals as of 17:10, 22 November 2026 (UTC)

Ignacio Vázquez (born 15 June 1997) is an Argentine professional footballer who plays as a centre-back for Platense.

== Career ==
Vázquez's career started in the ranks of Primera B Nacional's All Boys. After going unused on the substitutes bench for fixtures against Almagro and Chacarita Juniors, Vázquez made his bow in professional football on 27 May 2017 in a home defeat to San Martín; coming on in the second half in place of Sebastián Ibars. He featured five times in their relegation campaign of 2017–18, one of which was his starting debut against Sarmiento in April 2018. In the succeeding March, Vázquez scored his first goal in Primera B Metropolitana in a draw with Tristán Suárez. They were promoted in 2018–19, as Vázquez scored twice in the play-offs.

Ahead of the 2019–20 campaign, Vázquez was loaned to fellow Primera B Nacional team Belgrano. Fourteen appearances followed. On 22 October 2020, Vázquez signed a new contract with All Boys until December 2022 before heading out on loan to Primera B de Chile side San Luis. After debuting in a defeat to Magallanes on 4 November, the centre-back netted a goal in a loss to Ñublense on 16 November.

Vázquez returned to All Boys for the 2021 season. However, due to deadline issues, the club wasn't able to register him for the roster, which was why he in March 2021 was loaned out again, this time to Uruguayan club Cerro Largo.

== Personal life ==
In March 2019, Vázquez was involved in a traffic collision whilst travelling along National Route A002 with teammates Matías Bracamonte and Rodrigo Díaz. All three escaped without major trauma, though Vázquez suffered a head injury without the loss of consciousness.

== Career statistics ==
As of 27 December 2020.

Appearances and goals by club, season and competition
Club	Season	League			Cup		League Cup		Continental		Other		Total	
Club	Season	Division	Apps	Goals	Apps	Goals	Apps	Goals	Apps	Goals	Apps	Goals	Apps	Goals
All Boys	2016–17	Primera B Nacional	1	0	1	0	—		—		0	0	2	0
All Boys	2017–18	Primera B Nacional	5	0	0	0	—		—		0	0	5	0
All Boys	2018–19	Primera B Metropolitana	34	2	1	0	—		—		4 (Note: Appearance(s) in the Primera B Metropolitana play-offs)	2	39	4
All Boys	2019–20	Primera B Nacional	0	0	0	0	—		—		0	0	0	0
All Boys	2020	Primera B Nacional	0	0	0	0	—		—		0	0	0	0
All Boys	Total		40	2	2	0	—		—		4	2	46	4
Belgrano (loan)	2019–20	Primera B Nacional	14	0	0	0	—		—		0	0	14	0
San Luis (loan)	2020	Primera B	9	1	0	0	—		—		0	0	9	1
Career total			63	3	2	0	—		—		4	2	69	5

== Honours ==
Platense

- Argentine Primera División: 2025 Apertura
