= Andrés Desábato =

Argentine footballer (born 1990)

Personal information
- Full name: Andrés Alberto Desábato
- Date of birth: 30 March 1990 (age 36)
- Place of birth: Santa Fe, Argentina
- Height: 1.83 m (6 ft 0 in)
- Position: Goalkeeper

Youth career
- Vélez Sarsfield

Senior career*
Years	Team	Apps	(Gls)
2012–2014	Vélez Sarsfield	0	(0)
2012–2013	→ Guaraní A. Franco (loan)	1	(0)
2014–2022	Platense	31	(0)
2022–2023	All Boys	35	(0)
2023–2024	Barracas Central	35	(0)
2024	Bolívar	4	(0)
2024–2025	Platense	6	(0)
- * Club domestic league appearances and goals as of 17:05, 19 November 2025 (UTC)

Andrés Alberto Desábato (born 30 March 1990) is an Argentine professional footballer who plays as a goalkeeper.

== Career ==
Desábato began his career with Vélez Sarsfield. Desábato completed a loan move to Guaraní Antonio Franco of Torneo Argentino A in August 2012. Despite remaining for the 2012–13 campaign, he appeared in just one fixture - versus Sportivo Belgrano on 20 October 2012. In June 2014, Desábato left Vélez Sarsfield permanently to sign for Primera B Metropolitana side Platense. His debut came on 11 October 2014 against Sportivo Italiano, which was the first of thirty-one games in his opening five seasons. Platense won promotion in 2017–18, though Desábato never made the matchday squad.

At the end of December 2021, Desábato signed a deal with Primera Nacional club All Boys.

== Personal life ==
Leandro Luis Desábato, a fellow professional footballer, is the twin brother of Desábato. They are the cousins of Leandro Desábato, who is also a footballer.

== Career statistics ==
As of 6 March 2019.

Appearances and goals by club, season and competition
Club	Season	League			Cup		Continental		Other		Total	
Club	Season	Division	Apps	Goals	Apps	Goals	Apps	Goals	Apps	Goals	Apps	Goals
Vélez Sarsfield	2012–13	Primera División	0	0	0	0	0	0	0	0	0	0
Vélez Sarsfield	2013–14	Primera División	0	0	0	0	0	0	0	0	0	0
Vélez Sarsfield	Total		0	0	0	0	0	0	0	0	0	0
Guaraní Antonio Franco (loan)	2012–13	Torneo Argentino A	1	0	0	0	—		0	0	1	0
Platense	2014	Primera B Metropolitana	8	0	0	0	—		0	0	8	0
Platense	2015	Primera B Metropolitana	15	0	0	0	—		1 (Note: Appearance(s) in the Primera B Metropolitana play-offs)	0	16	0
Platense	2016	Primera B Metropolitana	3	0	0	0	—		0	0	3	0
Platense	2016–17	Primera B Metropolitana	4	0	0	0	—		0	0	4	0
Platense	2017–18	Primera B Metropolitana	0	0	0	0	—		0	0	0	0
Platense	2018–19	Primera B Nacional	0	0	0	0	—		0	0	0	0
Platense	Total		30	0	0	0	—		1	0	31	0
Career total			31	0	0	0	0	0	1	0	32	0

== Honours ==
Platense

- Argentine Primera División: 2025 Apertura
