= Guido Mainero =

Argentine footballer

Personal information
- Date of birth: 23 March 1995 (age 31)
- Place of birth: Córdoba, Argentina
- Height: 1.77 m (5 ft 9 1/2 in)
- Position: Winger

Team information
- Current team: Platense
- Number: 7

Youth career
- 2002–2014: Instituto

Senior career*
Years	Team	Apps	(Gls)
2014–2018	Instituto	70	(6)
2018–2024	Vélez Sarsfield	14	(0)
2019–2020	→ Defensa y Justicia (loan)	10	(2)
2020–2021	→ Deportes Iquique (loan)	12	(2)
2021–2023	→ Sarmiento (loan)	56	(5)
2024	Instituto	9	(0)
2024–	Platense	88	(11)
- * Club domestic league appearances and goals as of 17:07, 22 November 2026 (UTC)

Guido Mainero (born 23 March 1995) is an Argentine professional footballer who plays as a winger for Platense.

== Career ==
Mainero joined Instituto's academy in 2002. He was moved into their first-team for the 2014 Primera B Nacional campaign. He made his professional debut on 5 November 2014 during a win over Boca Unidos, which was the first of thirty-two appearances in his opening three seasons. In his fourth, he netted four goals throughout the year; notably the first against Villa Dálmine in April 2017. In January 2018, Mainero completed a transfer to Argentine Primera División side Vélez Sarsfield. His first appearance in the top-flight came in a 2–0 defeat to Chacarita Juniors on 5 February.

In July 2019, Mainero completed a season-long loan move to Defensa y Justicia. He made twelve appearances in all competitions whilst scoring two goals; in the league versus Talleres and Rosario Central. His 100th career appearance arrived on 3 March 2020 in the Copa Libertadores versus Santos; in what was his last match for Defensa due to the COVID-19 pandemic. He featured for Vélez on 31 October versus Huracán, before departing on loan in November to Chilean team Deportes Iquique. After debuting against Cobresal on 23 November, Mainero scored on 8 December versus Unión Española. After returning from loan in June 2021, he was loaned out once again, this time to Sarmiento until the end of 2022.

== Career statistics ==
As of 29 December 2020.

Club statistics
Club	Season	League			Cup		League Cup		Continental		Other		Total	
Club	Season	Division	Apps	Goals	Apps	Goals	Apps	Goals	Apps	Goals	Apps	Goals	Apps	Goals
Instituto	2014	Primera B Nacional	5	0	0	0	—		—		0	0	5	0
Instituto	2015	Primera B Nacional	14	0	1	0	—		—		0	0	15	0
Instituto	2016	Primera B Nacional	11	0	1	0	—		—		0	0	12	0
Instituto	2016–17	Primera B Nacional	28	4	0	0	—		—		0	0	28	4
Instituto	2017–18	Primera B Nacional	12	2	2	0	—		—		0	0	14	2
Instituto	Total		70	6	4	0	—		—		0	0	74	6
Vélez Sarsfield	2017–18	Argentine Primera División	8	0	0	0	—		—		0	0	8	0
Vélez Sarsfield	2018–19	Argentine Primera División	5	0	1	0	0	0	—		0	0	6	0
Vélez Sarsfield	2019–20	Argentine Primera División	0	0	0	0	0	0	0	0	0	0	0	0
Vélez Sarsfield	2020–21 (Note: Soccerway counts Copa de la Liga Profesional appearances as league appearances.)	Argentine Primera División	1	0	0	0	0	0	0	0	0	0	1	0
Vélez Sarsfield	Total		14	0	1	0	0	0	0	0	0	0	15	0
Defensa y Justicia (loan)	2019–20	Argentine Primera División	10	2	1	0	—		1 (Note: Appearance(s) in the Copa Libertadores)	0	0	0	12	2
Deportes Iquique (loan)	2020	Chilean Primera División	4	1	0	0	—		—		0	0	4	1
Career total			98	9	6	0	—		1	0	0	0	105	9

== Honours ==
Platense

- Argentine Primera División: 2025 Apertura
