= Club Atlético Platense =

Argentine football club

Platense
- Full name: Club Atlético Platense
- Nicknames: Calamares; Tinta de calamar Marrón
- Founded: 25 May 1905; 121 years ago
- Ground: Estadio Ciudad de Vicente López
- Capacity: 28,530
- Chairman: Gastón Arcieri
- Manager: Martín Palermo
- League: Primera División
- 2024: 6th (Champions via play-offs)
- Website: cap.org.ar
Home colours	Away colours	Third colours

Club Atlético Platense is an Argentine sports club based in Florida, Buenos Aires. The club nickname is Calamar (Squid) after the journalist Antonio Palacio Zino said that the team moved "like a squid in its ink".

Although the club hosts many activities, Platense is mostly known for its football team. A historic team in Argentina, they won their first league title in their 120 years of existence in the 2025 Apertura, beating Huracán in the final.

== History ==
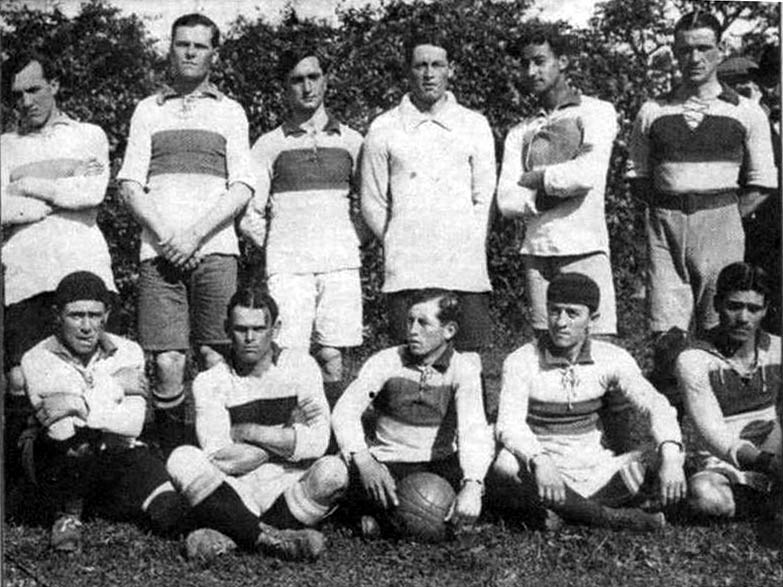
Platense squad in 1913

Founded on 25 May 1905, Platense played in the second division from 1956 to 1964, and from 1972 to 1976, when the team finally won its first title, the Primera B championship that allowed Platense to play in the Primera División. The club achieved cult status in the late 1970s as they repeatedly staved off relegation through a series of "last-day miracles" (relegating other teams such as Temperley after defeating them in decisive matches played to keep a place in the first division. Platense survived at the top level of Argentine football until finally succumbing to relegation in 1999.

This would be the beginning of a steep decline: Platense was subsequently relegated to the regionalised third division, Primera B Metropolitana, at the end of the 2001–02 season. On 17 May 2006, Platense won its second title and was promoted back to the Argentine second division Nacional B. But on 8 May 2010 The Squid would be relegated again to the third category. On 2 May 2018, Platense was directly promoted to the second division after winning the Primera B Metropolitana title in a victory over club Estudiantes de Caseros. In 2021, Platense would make their return to the Primera División for the first time in 22 years after defeating Estudiantes de Río Cuarto on penalties to earn promotion.

In 2023, Platense reached the final of the league cup, defeating Godoy Cruz in a heart-stopping penalty shootout. After almost 20 penalties taken, right back Raul Lozano converted the final penalty, leading the team to play their first final in more than 80 years. Platense lost the final against Rosario Central, achieving a historic runner-up finish.

The club's main claim to fame during these years is the success of Momo and David Trezeguet, who had debuted at Platense but after playing only 5 matches in Argentine Primera División was transferred to AS Monaco.

Platense's fans base can be found in Vicente López, Olivos and Florida towns (all of them part of the Vicente López Partido), as well as in Villa Urquiza and Saavedra neighbourhoods. The club is also cited in Bioy Casares's book El Sueño de los héroes ("Dream of Heroes" ISBN 0-7043-2634-5). Among its supporters, the Tango music singer Roberto Goyeneche and the British author Chris Moss were probably the most notable fans.

On the 1st of June 2025, Guido Mainero scored the only goal of the game as Platense defeated Huracán 1-0 in the Apertura Final to become Primera División champions for the first time in the club's history.

== Team image ==
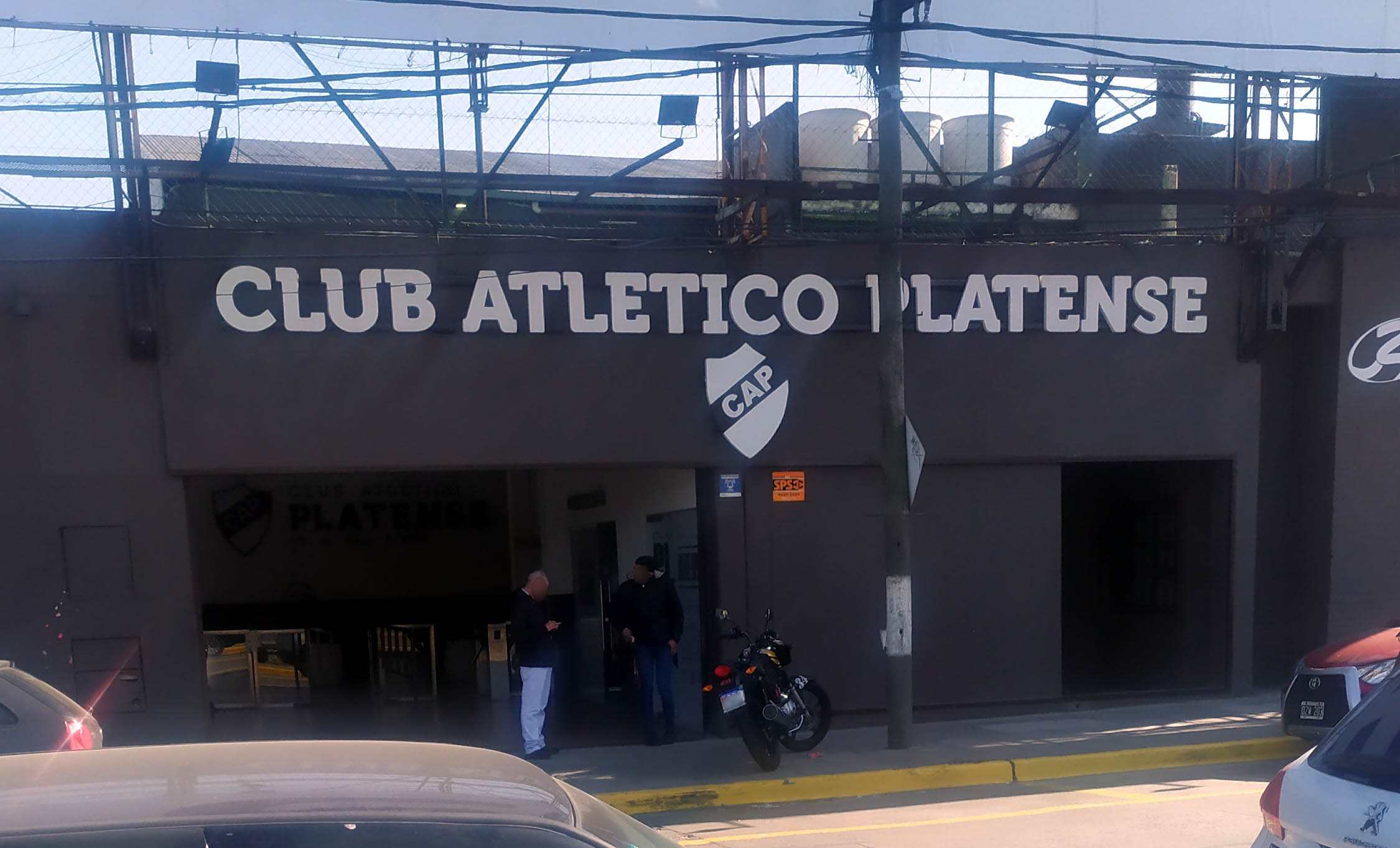
Entrance to the C.A. Platense pictured in 2024

According to the official version, the first Platense shirts were red with black sleeves (the colors of the Platense stable), but the club then adopted the colors of the jacket (white) and cap (brown) worn by the jockey who won the race in 1905.

Nevertheless, another historians state that Platense wore white shirts (with no brown elements) until 1908, when a club executive added a horizontal (brown) patch to the shirts with the purpose of covering the mud stains caused by the frequent flooding in the zone where the stadium stood, (Av. del Libertador and Manuela Pedraza in Belgrano, Buenos Aires).

The club has issued some red shirts (as alternate kits) to commemorate the first colors of the club. The model released in 1997 and made by Puma caused great controversy among their fans due to its similarity with the Argentinos Juniors (which had a fierce rivalry with Platense) kit.

Along their history, Platense has also introduced some variants to the brown and white colors, such as a vertical stripes shirt worn in 1922 (which had a commemorative edition in 2012). During a long period of their history, Platense also wore a brown shirt with white sleeves.

=== Kit history ===
1905–07 (Note: The precise date when Platense adopted the white and brown colors is unclear although it is believed that it happened soon after their foundation. Some sources mention 1907.)	Classic kit (Note: This is regarded as the 'classic' shirt model, although Platense have also worn white only (1971, 1976), maroon only (1953–55, 1977), and even other shirt models along their history.)	1922 (Note: Although Platense have varied their models several times along their history, this is included due to be distinctive from the others.)

== Players ==
=== Current squad ===
As of 10 September 2026

No.	Pos.	Nation	Player
1	GK	ARG	Brian Bustos
3	DF	ARG	Tomás Silva
4	DF	ARG	Agustín Lagos (on loan from Vélez Sarsfield)
5	MF	ARG	Iván Gómez
6	DF	ARG	Eugenio Raggio
7	FW	ARG	Guido Mainero
9	FW	ARG	Tomás Nasif (on loan from River Plate)
10	MF	ARG	Franco Zapiola
11	FW	URU	Nicolás López
13	DF	ARG	Ignacio Vázquez (captain)
15	MF	ARG	Maximiliano Amarfil (on loan from Cipolletti)
16	FW	ARG	Gastón Togni (on loan from Defensa y Justicia)
17	MF	ARG	Felipe Bussio (on loan from Vélez Sarsfield)
18	FW	ARG	Bautista Merlini
19	FW	PAR	Héctor Bobadilla (on loan from Cerro Porteño)
20	FW	ARG	Luciano Giménez (on loan from Estudiantes-LP)
21	FW	ARG	Augusto Lotti

No.	Pos.	Nation	Player
22	GK	ARG	Nicolás Sumavil
23	MF	ARG	Leonardo Heredia (on loan from Argentinos Juniors)
24	MF	URU	Martín Barrios (on loan from Racing Club)
25	DF	ARG	Juan Ignacio Saborido
26	MF	ARG	Pablo Ferreira
27	MF	ARG	Santiago Dalmasso (on loan from Boca Juniors)
28	FW	ARG	Manuel Tucker
29	FW	ARG	Franco Minerva
30	GK	ARG	Juan Pablo Cozzani
31	DF	ARG	Víctor Cuesta
32	DF	ARG	Santiago Quirós (on loan from Racing Club)
33	FW	ARG	Juan Carlos Gauto (on loan from Basel)
34	DF	ARG	Mateo Mendía (on loan from Boca Juniors)
38	DF	ARG	Celías Ingenthron
42	DF	ARG	Gonzalo Goñi
43	FW	ARG	Nicolás Retamar (on loan from Ferro Carril Oeste)
79	FW	ARG	Bruno Sepúlveda
99	FW	ARG	Gonzalo Lencina
—	DF	ARG	Fabricio López (on loan from Deportivo Armenio)

=== Reserve squad ===
Note: Flags indicate national team as defined under FIFA eligibility rules; some limited exceptions apply. Players may hold more than one non-FIFA nationality.

No.	Pos.	Nation	Player
35	MF	ARG	Demian Troya
36	GK	ARG	Joaquín Giudice
37	GK	ARG	Santino Cambiasso
40	MF	ARG	Nicolás Ortiz
41	DF	ARG	Thiago Currado
44	DF	ARG	Agustín Maglione
45	DF	ARG	Tomás Giménez
46	DF	ARG	Lucas Testa
48	MF	ARG	Agustín Funes

No.	Pos.	Nation	Player
49	MF	ARG	Santiago Bouhet
50	MF	ARG	Salvador Rixner
51	FW	ARG	Lucas Zelaya
52	MF	ARG	Ariel Ramírez
53	FW	ARG	Luca Bastilla
54	FW	ARG	Fausto San Pedro
55	FW	PAR	Alejandro Vera
56	DF	ARG	Axel Guzmán

=== Out on loan ===
Note: Flags indicate national team as defined under FIFA eligibility rules; some limited exceptions apply. Players may hold more than one non-FIFA nationality.

No.	Pos.	Nation	Player
2	DF	ARG	Juan Pablo Pignani (at Central Córdoba until 31 December 2026)
8	DF	ARG	Fernando Juárez (at Central Córdoba until 31 December 2026)
18	DF	ARG	Santiago Postel (at Deportivo Cuenca until 31 December 2026)

No.	Pos.	Nation	Player
28	FW	ARG	Agustín Alonso (at Chaco For Ever until 31 December 2026)
40	DF	ARG	Gonzalo Valdivia (at Mitre until 31 December 2026)

== Honours ==
=== League ===
- Primera División (1): 2025 Apertura
- Primera B Metropolitana (3): 1976. 2005–06, 2017–18
- Primera C (1): 1924 AAm

== Statistics ==
- Seasons in First División: 76
- Seasons in Second Division: 26
- Seasons in Third Division: 13
- Best position in Primera División: Champions in 2025
- Best position in Copa Argentina: Quarter-finals in 1970, 2018
- Best position in Copa de la Liga Profesional: Runner-up in 2023
- Longest victory: 8–0 to Argentino de Quilmes in 1939
- All-time top scorer: Daniel Vega (2002–2021) with 86 goals
- All-time most capped player: Enrique Topini (1959–1973) with 324 games
