= 2025 Estudiantes de La Plata season =

Estudiantes de La Plata
2025 season
- President: Juan Sebastián Verón
- Manager: Eduardo Domínguez
- Stadium: Estadio Jorge Luis Hirschi
- Torneo Apertura: Round of 16
- Torneo Clausura: Champions (7th title)
- Copa Argentina: Round of 32
- Copa Libertadores: Quarter-finals
- Supercopa Internacional: Runner-up
- Trofeo de Campeones: Champions (2nd title)
- Average home league attendance: 32,384
Home colours	Away colours	Third colours

The 2025 season was the 120th for Club Estudiantes de La Plata and their 11th consecutive season in the Primera División. On 13 December, Estudiantes won their 7th title, beating Racing on penalties in the Torneo Clausura final.

The club also competed in the Copa Argentina, Supercopa Internacional, Copa Libertadores, and Trofeo de Campeones de la Liga Profesional.

== Squad ==
=== Current squad ===
As of 31 January 2025

Note: Flags indicate national team as defined under FIFA eligibility rules; some limited exceptions apply. Players may hold more than one non-FIFA nationality.

No.	Pos.	Nation	Player
1	GK	ARG	Fabricio Iacovich
2	DF	ARG	Facundo Rodríguez
4	DF	ARG	Román Gómez
5	MF	ARG	Santiago Ascacíbar
6	DF	ARG	Santiago Núñez
7	MF	ARG	José Sosa (captain)
8	MF	URU	Gabriel Neves
9	FW	ARG	Guido Carrillo
10	FW	URU	Tiago Palacios
11	MF	ARG	Facundo Farías
12	GK	ARG	Matías Mansilla
13	DF	ARG	Gastón Benedetti
14	DF	URU	Sebastián Boselli (on loan from River Plate)

No.	Pos.	Nation	Player
15	DF	PAR	Santiago Arzamendia
16	FW	URU	Mauro Méndez
17	FW	ARG	Joaquín Tobio Burgos
18	FW	COL	Edwuin Cetré
19	FW	COL	Alexis Manyoma
20	DF	ARG	Eric Meza
21	MF	ARG	Ezequiel Piovi
22	MF	ARG	Alexis Castro
23	FW	ARG	Luciano Giménez
24	MF	ARG	Bautista Kociubinski
25	MF	ARG	Cristian Medina
27	FW	ARG	Lucas Alario
29	FW	ARG	Fabricio Pérez

=== Transfers In ===
Pos.	Player	Transferred from	Fee	Date	Source
MF	(Argentina) Cristian Medina	(Argentina) Boca Juniors	US$15,000,000	18 January 2025	
DF	(Argentina) Santiago Núñez	(Mexico) Santos Laguna	Undisclosed	27 January 2025	
MF	(Argentina) Lucas Piovi	(Ecuador) LDU Quito	Undisclosed	28 January 2025	
MF	(Argentina) Facundo Farías	(United States) Inter Miami CF	Undisclosed	1 February 2025	
DF	(Argentina) Ramiro Funes Mori	(Argentina) River Plate	Free	22 February 2025	
GK	(Uruguay) Fernando Muslera	(Turkey) Galatasaray	Free	24 June 2025	
FW	(Argentina) Matías Godoy	(Argentina) Instituto	Loan return	30 June 2025	
DF	(Argentina) Juan Guasone	(Italy) Salernitana	Loan return	30 June 2025	
DF	(Argentina) Leandro González Pírez	(Argentina) River Plate	Free	11 July 2025	

=== Transfers Out ===
Pos.	Player	Transferred to	Fee	Date	Source
MF	(Argentina) Enzo Pérez	(Argentina) River Plate	Free	3 January 2025	
DF	(Argentina) Juan Guasone	(Italy) Salernitana	Loan	14 January 2025	
FW	(Argentina) Matías Godoy	(Argentina) Instituto	Loan	16 January 2025	
MF	(Chile) Javier Altamirano	Universidad de Chile	Loan	21 January 2025	
FW	(Uruguay) Mauro Méndez	(Argentina) Banfield	Loan	17 July 2025	
FW	(Colombia) Alexis Manyoma	(United States) Colorado Rapids	Loan	8 August 2025	

== Competitions ==
=== Overall record ===
Competition	First match	Last match	Starting round	Final position	Record							
Competition	First match	Last match	Starting round	Final position	Pld	W	D	L	GF	GA	GD	Win %
Torneo Apertura	25 January 2025	10 May 2025	Matchday 1	Round of 16	17	5	7	5	18	21	−3	29.41
Torneo Clausura	13 July 2025	13 December	Matchday 1	Winner	20	9	4	7	21	19	+2	45.00
Copa Argentina	25 February 2025	1 June 2025	Round of 64	Round of 32	2	1	1	0	3	2	+1	50.00
Supercopa Internacional	8 July 2025		Finals	Runner-up	1	0	0	1	0	2	−2	0.00
Copa Libertadores	1 April 2025	25 September 2025	Group stage	Quarter-finals	10	6	1	3	14	7	+7	60.00
Trofeo de Campeones	20 December 2025		Finals	Winner	1	1	0	0	2	1	+1	100.00
Total					51	22	13	16	58	52	+6	43.14

Source: Competitions

=== Primera División ===
==== Torneo Apertura ====
===== League table =====
Pos	Team	Pld	W	D	L	GF	GA	GD	Pts	Qualification
6	Independiente Rivadavia	16	7	6	3	20	17	+3	27	Advance to round of 16
7	Barracas Central	16	7	5	4	20	18	+2	26	Advance to round of 16
8	Estudiantes (LP)	16	5	6	5	18	19	−1	21	Advance to round of 16
9	Newell's Old Boys	16	5	4	7	12	15	−3	19	
10	Defensa y Justicia	16	5	4	7	18	22	−4	19	

Source: AFA

===== Results by round =====
Round	1	2	3	4	5	6	7	8	9	10	11	12	13
Ground	H	A	H	A	H	A	H	A	A	H	A	H	A
Result	W	D	W	D	W	D	W	W	L	D	L	L	D
Position													

A = Away; H = Home; W = Win; D = Draw; L = Loss

===== Matches =====
25 January 2025 1	Estudiantes	3–1	Unión	La Plata
19:15 UTC−3	Palacios 8'; Tobio Burgos 11'; Ascacíbar 21'	Report	Verde 80'	Stadium: Estadio Jorge Luis Hirschi

29 January 2025 2	Huracán	0–0	Estudiantes	Buenos Aires
19:15 UTC−3		Report		Stadium: Estadio Tomás Adolfo Ducó

3 February 2025 3	Estudiantes	2–0	Racing	La Plata
19:15 UTC−3	Ascacíbar 34'; Neves 58'	Report		Stadium: Estadio Jorge Luis Hirschi

7 February 2025 4	Independiente Rivadavia	2–2	Estudiantes	Mendoza
22:15 UTC−3	Villa 80'; Sartori 83'	Report	Cetré 58'; Neves 81'	Stadium: Estadio Bautista Gargantini

11 February 2025 5	Estudiantes	1–0	Banfield	La Plata
20:00 UTC−3	Alario 78' (pen.)	Report		Stadium: Estadio Jorge Luis Hirschi

15 February 2025 6	Aldovisi	2–2	Estudiantes	Mar del Plata
17:00 UTC−3	Mottes 57'; Torres 77' (pen.)	Report	Ascacíbar 12'; Sosa 81'	Stadium: Estadio José María Minella

21 February 2025 7	Estudiantes	3–2	Central Córdoba	La Plata
19:15 UTC−3	Giménez 69'; Tobio Burgos 71'; Arzamendia 84'	Report	Perelló 44'; Heredia 51'	Stadium: Estadio Jorge Luis Hirschi

1 March 2025 8	River Plate	0–2	Estudiantes	Buenos Aires
19:15 UTC−3		Report	Castro 9'; Ascacíbar 90+4'	Stadium: Estadio Más Monumental

9 March 2025 9	Defensa y Justicia	1–0	Estudiantes	Buenos Aires
17:00 UTC−3	Togni 87'	Report		Stadium: Estadio Norberto "Tito" Tomaghello

15 March 2025 10	Estudiantes	1–1	Newell's Old Boys	La Plata
18:30 UTC−3	Palacios 26'		Herrera 45+1'	Stadium: Estadio Jorge Luis Hirschi

27 March 2025 11	Barracas Central	2–1	Estudiantes	Sarandí
18:00 UTC−3	Tapia 24'; Bruera 88'	Report	Palacios 83'	Stadium: Estadio Julio Humberto Grondona

4 April 2025 12	Estudiantes	0–1	Belgrano	La Plata
19:00 UTC−3		Report	Fernández 41'	Stadium: Estadio Jorge Luis Hirschi

13 April 2025 13	Gimnasia	1–1	Estudiantes	La Plata
18:00 UTC−3	Castro 33'	Report	Giménez 90+3'	Stadium: Estadio Juan Carmelo Zerillo

19 April 2025 14	Boca Juniors	2–0	Estudiantes	Buenos Aires
20:30 UTC−3	Palacios 48'; Merentiel 63'	Report		Stadium: La Bombonera; Referee: Nazareno Arasa

28 April 2025 15	Estudiantes	0–0	Tigre	La Plata
19:30 UTC−3		Report		Stadium: Estadio Jorge Luis Hirschi

2 May 2025 16	Argentinos Juniors	4–0	Estudiantes	Buenos Aires
15:30 UTC−3	Molina 26', 27'; Lescano 60'; Herrera 65'	Report		Stadium: Estadio Diego Armando Maradona

===== Final stages =====
10 May 2025 Round of 16	Rosario Central	2–0	Estudiantes	Rosario
16:30	Quintana 87'; Campaz 90+5'	Report		Stadium: Gigante de Arroyito; Referee: Andrés Merlos

==== Torneo Clausura ====
===== League table =====
Pos	Team	Pld	W	D	L	GF	GA	GD	Pts	Qualification
6	Barracas Central	16	5	8	3	19	17	+2	23	Advance to round of 16
7	Tigre	16	5	7	4	14	13	+1	22	Advance to round of 16
8	Estudiantes (LP)	16	6	3	7	17	18	−1	21	Advance to round of 16
9	Banfield	16	6	3	7	15	21	−6	21	
10	Belgrano	16	4	8	4	13	11	+2	20	

Source: AFA

===== Matches =====
14 July 2025 1	Unión	1–0	Estudiantes	Santa Fe
21:15 UTC−3	Martínez 21'	Report		Stadium: Estadio 15 de Abril

21 July 2025 2	Estudiantes	2–1	Huracán	La Plata
19:00 UTC−3	Cetré 65'; Castro 70'	Report	Pereyra 3'	Stadium: Estadio Jorge Luis Hirschi

26 July 2025 3	Racing	0–1	Estudiantes	Avellaneda
21:15 UTC−3		Report	Carrillo 55'	Stadium: El Cilindro

7 August 2025 4	Estudiantes	2–1	Independiente Rivadavia	La Plata
21:00 UTC−3	Pérez 8'; González Pírez 40'	Report	Villa 90+4'	Stadium: Estadio Jorge Luis Hirschi

17 August 2025 5	Banfield	3–2	Estudiantes	Banfield
16:15 UTC−3	Auzmendi 54'; Ríos 61'; Río 63'	Report	Arzamendia 20'; Gómez 45'	Stadium: Estadio Florencio Sola

25 August 2025 6	Estudiantes	1–0	Aldosivi	La Plata
19:15 UTC−3	González Pírez 12'	Report		Stadium: Estadio Jorge Luis Hirschi

30 August 2025 7	Central Córdoba	2–0	Estudiantes	Santiago del Estero
17:00 UTC−3	Muslera 5' (o.g.); Perelló 10'	Report		Stadium: Alfredo Terrera

13 September 2025 8	Estudiantes	1–2	River Plate	La Plata
19:00 UTC−3	Núñez 90+1'	Report	Galoppo 6'; Fernández 13'	Stadium: Estadio Jorge Luis Hirschi

22 September 2025 9	Estudiantes	1–0	Defensa y Justicia	La Plata
19:00 UTC−3	Delgado 76' (o.g.)	Report		Stadium: Estadio Jorge Luis Hirschi

30 September 2025 10	Newell's Old Boys	1–1	Estudiantes	Rosario
19:00 UTC−3	Lollo 90+1'	Report	Meza 75'	Stadium: Estadio Marcelo Bielsa

5 October 2025 11	Estudiantes	1–1	Barracas Central	La Plata
16:30 UTC−3	Carrillo 33'	Report	Candia 49'	Stadium: Estadio Jorge Luis Hirschi

11 October 2025 12	Belgrano	1–1	Estudiantes	Córdoba
22:15 UTC−3	Fernández 68'	Report	Compagnucci 90+4' (o.g.)	Stadium: El Gigante de Alberdi

19 October 2025 13	Estudiantes	2–0	Gimnasia y Esgrima	La Plata
15:00 UTC−3	Cetre 45+1'; Carrillo 52'	Report		Stadium: Estadio Jorge Luis Hirschi

2 November 2025 14	Estudiantes	1–2	Boca Juniors	La Plata
16:00 UTC−3	Cetré 58' (pen.)	Report	Zeballos 48'; Merentiel 90+6' (pen.)	Stadium: Estadio Jorge Luis Hirschi; Referee: Leandro Rey Hilfer

9 November 2025 15	Tigre	1–0	Estudiantes	Victoria
21:30 UTC−3	Cabrera 24'	Report		Stadium: Estadio José Dellagiovanna

16 November 2025 16	Estudiantes	1–2	Argentinos Juniors	La Plata
20:15 UTC−3	Tobio Burgos 63'	Report	López 23'; Lescano 65'	Stadium: Estadio Jorge Luis Hirschi

===== Final stages =====
23 November 2025 Round of 16	Rosario Central	0–1	Estudiantes	Rosario
17:30		Report	Cetré 30'	Stadium: Gigante de Arroyito; Referee: Pablo Dóvalo

29 November 2025 Quarter-finals	Central Córdoba	0–1	Estudiantes	Santiago del Estero
21:30		Report	Palacios 64'	Stadium: Único Madre de Ciudades; Referee: Yael Falcón Pérez

8 December 2025 Semi-finals	Gimnasia y Esgrima	0–1	Estudiantes	La Plata
17:00		Report	Palacios 61'	Stadium: Juan Carmelo Zerillo; Referee: Facundo Tello

13 December 2025 Final	Racing	1–1 (a.e.t.) (4–5 p)	Estudiantes	Santiago del Estero
21:00	Martínez 80'	Report	Carrillo 90+2'	Stadium: Estadio Único Madre de Ciudades; Referee: Nicolás Ramírez
	Penalties
	Martínez (penalty scored); Vietto (penalty scored); García Basso (penalty scored); Martirena (penalty missed); Sosa (penalty scored); Pardo (penalty missed)		(penalty scored) Sosa; (penalty missed) Cetré; (penalty scored) Alario; (penalty scored) Tobio Burgos; (penalty scored) Meza; (penalty scored) Rodríguez

=== Copa Argentina ===
25 February 2025 Round of 64	Estudiantes	2–1	Sarmiento (LB)	Santa Fe
	Tobio Burgos 18'; Pérez 89'	Report	Ochoa 73'	Stadium: 15 de Abril

1 June 2025 Round of 32	Estudiantes	1–1 (2–4 p)	Aldosivi	Florencio Varela
13:10	Castro 15'	Report	Giani 25'	Stadium: Norberto "Tito" Tomaghello; Referee: Bryan Ferreyra
	Penalties
	Castro (penalty missed); Benedetti (penalty scored); Arzamendia (penalty missed); Ascacíbar (penalty scored)		(penalty scored) Torres; (penalty scored) Preciado; (penalty scored) Breitenbruch; (penalty scored) Guerrico

=== Copa Libertadores ===
==== Group stage ====
Pos	Team	Pld	W	D	L	GF	GA	GD	Pts	Qualification	EST	BOT	UCH	CBO
1	(Argentina) Estudiantes	6	4	0	2	11	5	+6	12	Advance to round of 16	—	1–0	1–2	2–0
2	(Brazil) Botafogo	6	4	0	2	8	5	+3	12	Advance to round of 16	3–2	—	1–0	2–0
3	Universidad de Chile	6	3	1	2	8	6	+2	10	Transfer to Copa Sudamericana	0–3	1–0	—	4–0
4	(Venezuela) Carabobo	6	0	1	5	2	13	−11	1		0–2	1–2	1–1	—

Source: CONMEBOL

1 April 2025 1	Carabobo (Venezuela)	0–2	(Argentina) Estudiantes	Valencia, Venezuela
18:00 UTC−4		Report	Núñez 45'; Ascacíbar 73' (pen.)	Stadium: Estadio Misael Delgado; Attendance: 5,372; Referee: Jhon Ospina (Colombia)

8 April 2025 2	Estudiantes (Argentina)	1–2	Universidad de Chile	La Plata, Argentina
21:30 UTC−3	Piovi 3'	Report	Aránguiz 7' (pen.); Zaldivia 10'	Stadium: Estadio Jorge Luis Hirschi; Referee: Derlis López (Paraguay)

23 April 2025 3	Estudiantes (Argentina)	1–0	(Brazil) Botafogo	La Plata, Argentina
21:30 UTC−3	Carrillo 38'	Report		Stadium: Estadio Jorge Luis Hirschi; Referee: Gustavo Tejera (Uruguay)

7 May 2025 4	Universidad de Chile	0–3	(Argentina) Estudiantes	Santiago, Chile
20:00 UTC−4		Report	Palacios 22'; Ascacíbar 31'; Carrillo 39'	Stadium: Estadio Nacional Julio Martínez Prádanos; Referee: Andrés Rojas (Colombia)

14 May 2025 5	Botafogo (Brazil)	3–2	(Argentina) Estudiantes	Rio de Janeiro, Brazil
21:30 UTC−3	Rwan 42'; Igor Jesus 52'; Artur 85'	Report	Palacios 64' (pen.), 77'	Stadium: Estádio Olímpico Nilton Santos; Attendance: 26,613; Referee: Juan Benítez (Paraguay)

27 May 2025 6	Estudiantes (Argentina)	2–0	(Venezuela) Carabobo	La Plata, Argentina
21:30 UTC−3	Cetré 10'; Giménez 24'	Report		Stadium: Estadio Jorge Luis Hirschi; Referee: Augusto Menéndez (Peru)

==== Final stages ====
The draw for the round of 16 was held on 2 June 2025, 12:00 PYT (UTC−3) at the CONMEBOL headquarters in Luque, Paraguay.

==== Round of 16 ====
13 August 2025 First leg	Cerro Porteño (Paraguay)	0–1	(Argentina) Estudiantes	Asunción, Paraguay
19:00 UTC−3		Report	Ascacíbar 90+8' (pen.)	Stadium: Estadio General Pablo Rojas; Referee: Piero Maza (Chile)

20 August 2025 Second leg	Estudiantes (Argentina)	0–0 (1–0 agg.)	(Paraguay) Cerro Porteño	La Plata, Argentina
19:00 UTC−3		Report		Stadium: Estadio Jorge Luis Hirschi; Referee: Jesús Valenzuela (Venezuela)

==== Quarter-finals ====
18 September 2025 First leg	Flamengo (Brazil)	2–1	(Argentina) Estudiantes	Rio de Janeiro, Brazil
21:30 UTC−3	Pedro 1'; Varela 9'	Report	Léo Pereira 90+1' (o.g.)	Stadium: Estádio do Maracanã; Referee: Andrés Rojas (Colombia)

25 September 2025 Second leg	Estudiantes (Argentina)	1–0 (2–2 agg.) (2–4 p)	(Brazil) Flamengo	La Plata, Argentina
21:30 UTC−3	Benedetti 45+2'	Report		Stadium: Estadio Jorge Luis Hirschi; Referee: Piero Maza (Chile)
	Penalties
	Sosa (penalty scored); Benedetti (penalty missed); Cetré (penalty scored); Ascacíbar (penalty missed)		(penalty scored) Jorginho; (penalty scored) Luiz Araújo; (penalty scored) Carrascal; (penalty scored) Léo Pereira

=== Supercopa Internacional ===
8 July 2025 Final	Estudiantes	0–2	Vélez Sarsfield	Avellaneda
20:30 UTC-3		Report	Galván 52'; Romero 73'	Stadium: Estadio Libertadores de América; Referee: Darío Herrera

=== Trofeo de Campeones ===
20 December 2025 Final	Estudiantes	2–1	Platense	San Nicolás de los Arroyos
18:00 UTC−3	Alario 79', 90'	Report	Zapiola 49'	Stadium: Estadio Único de San Nicolás; Referee: Leandro Rey Hilfer
