= 2025 Torneo Clausura final =

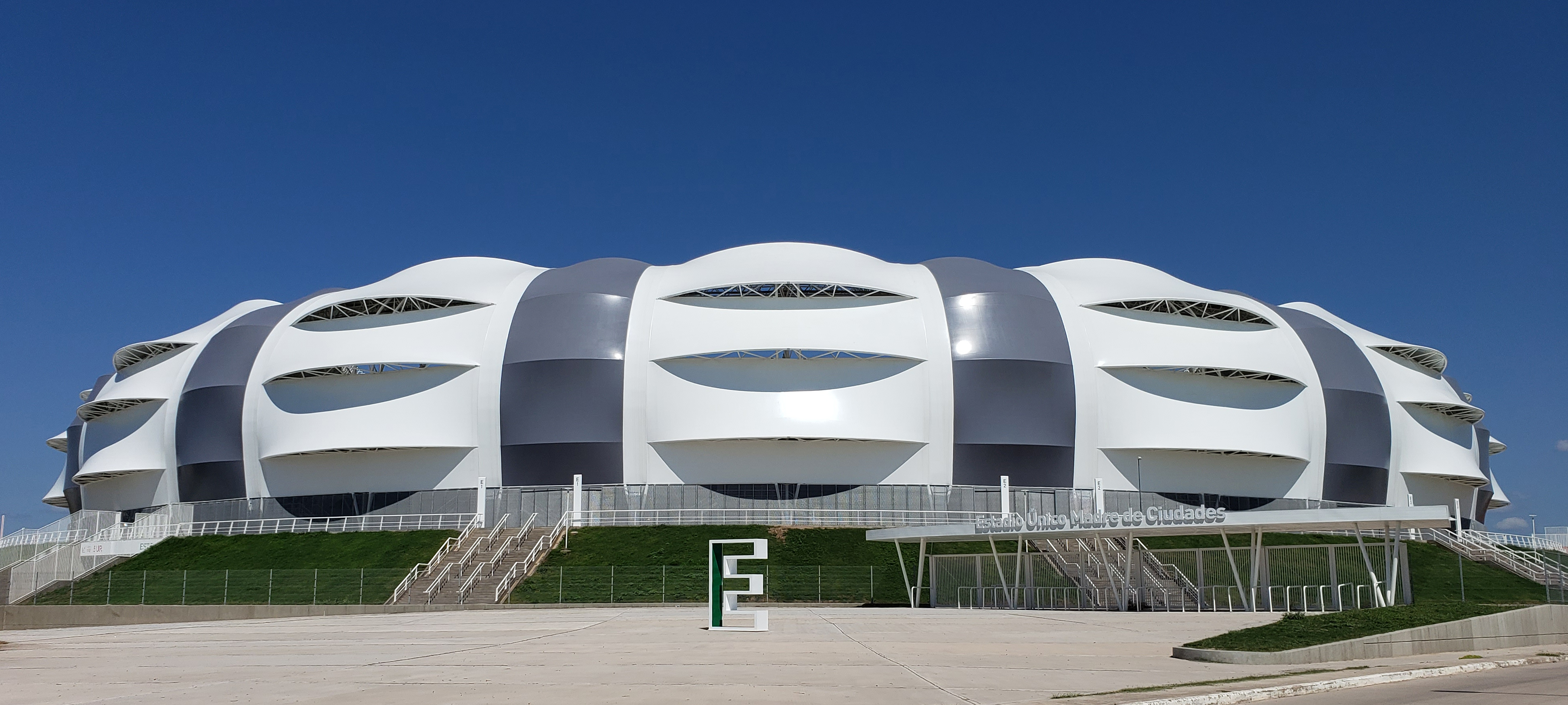
- Estadio Único Madre de Ciudades, venue
- Event: 2025 Torneo Clausura
Racing	Estudiantes (LP)
1	1
- After extra time Estudiantes (LP) won 5–4 on penalties
- Date: 13 December 2025
- Venue: Único Madre de Ciudades, Santiago del Estero
- Referee: Nicolás Ramírez
- Attendance: 33,500

The 2025 Torneo Clausura final was the last match of the 2025 Torneo Clausura of the 2025 Argentine Primera División. It was held at the Estadio Único Madre de Ciudades in Santiago del Estero on 13 December 2025, between Racing and Estudiantes (LP).

Estudiantes (LP) won their seventh Argentine Primera División title by defeating Racing 5–4 in a penalty shootout after a 1–1 draw in extra time. As champions, Estudiantes (LP) qualified for the 2026 Copa Libertadores and the 2025 Trofeo de Campeones.

== Qualified teams ==
Team	Previous finals app.
Racing	**1913**, **1915**, **1951**, 1967 Met.
Estudiantes (LP)	**1967 Met.**, 1968 Met., **1983 Nac.**, **2006 Ap.**

Bold indicates winning years

== Road to the final ==
Note: In all results below, the score of the finalist is given first (H: home; A: away).

Racing		Round	Estudiantes (LP)	
Opponent	Result	Group stage	Opponent	Result
Barracas Central	0–1 (H)	Matchday 1	Unión	0–1 (A)
Belgrano	1–0 (A)	Matchday 2	Huracán	2–1 (H)
Estudiantes (LP)	0–1 (H)	Matchday 3	Racing	1–0 (A)
Boca Juniors	1–1 (A)	Matchday 4	Independiente Rivadavia	2–1 (H)
Tigre	1–2 (H)	Matchday 5	Banfield	2–3 (A)
Argentinos Juniors	1–4 (A)	Matchday 6	Aldosivi	1–0 (H)
Unión	2–3 (H)	Matchday 7	Central Córdoba (SdE)	0–2 (A)
San Lorenzo	2–0 (H)	Matchday 8	River Plate	1–2 (H)
Huracán	2–0 (A)	Matchday 9	Defensa y Justicia	1–0 (H)
Independiente	0–0 (H)	Matchday 10	Newell's Old Boys	1–1 (A)
Independiente Rivadavia	0–0 (H)	Matchday 11	Barracas Central	1–1 (H)
Banfield	3–1 (A)	Matchday 12	Belgrano	1–1 (A)
Aldosivi	1–0 (H)	Matchday 13	Gimnasia y Esgrima (LP)	2–0 (H)
Central Córdoba (SdE)	0–0 (A)	Matchday 14	Boca Juniors	1–2 (H)
Defensa y Justicia	1–0 (H)	Matchday 15	Tigre	0–1 (A)
Newell's Old Boys	1–0 (A)	Matchday 16	Argentinos Juniors	1–2 (H)
**Zone A third place**: Pos / Team / Pld / W / D / L / GF / GA / GD / Pts; 1 / Boca Juniors / 16 / 8 / 5 / 3 / 28 / 12 / +16 / 29; 2 / Unión / 16 / 6 / 7 / 3 / 20 / 13 / +7 / 25; **3** / Racing / **16** / **7** / **4** / **5** / **16** / **13** / **+3** / 25; 4 / Central Córdoba (SdE) / 16 / 5 / 9 / 2 / 17 / 11 / +6 / 24; 5 / Argentinos Juniors / 16 / 7 / 3 / 6 / 18 / 13 / +5 / 24; 6 / Barracas Central / 16 / 5 / 8 / 3 / 19 / 17 / +2 / 23; 7 / Tigre / 16 / 5 / 7 / 4 / 14 / 13 / +1 / 22; 8 / Estudiantes (LP) / 16 / 6 / 3 / 7 / 17 / 18 / −1 / 21; Source: AFA		Final standings	**Zone A eighth place**: Pos / Team / Pld / W / D / L / GF / GA / GD / Pts; 1 / Boca Juniors / 16 / 8 / 5 / 3 / 28 / 12 / +16 / 29; 2 / Unión / 16 / 6 / 7 / 3 / 20 / 13 / +7 / 25; 3 / Racing / 16 / 7 / 4 / 5 / 16 / 13 / +3 / 25; 4 / Central Córdoba (SdE) / 16 / 5 / 9 / 2 / 17 / 11 / +6 / 24; 5 / Argentinos Juniors / 16 / 7 / 3 / 6 / 18 / 13 / +5 / 24; 6 / Barracas Central / 16 / 5 / 8 / 3 / 19 / 17 / +2 / 23; 7 / Tigre / 16 / 5 / 7 / 4 / 14 / 13 / +1 / 22; **8** / Estudiantes (LP) / **16** / **6** / **3** / **7** / **17** / **18** / **−1** / 21; Source: AFA	
Racing		Round	Estudiantes (LP)	
Opponent	Result	Final stages	Opponent	Result
River Plate	3–2 (H)	Round of 16	Rosario Central	1–0 (A)
Tigre	0–0 (4–2 (p)) (H)	Quarter-finals	Central Córdoba (SdE)	1–0 (A)
Boca Juniors	1–0 (A)	Semi-finals	Gimnasia y Esgrima (LP)	1–0 (A)

== Match ==
Ignacio Rodríguez and Elías Torres (Racing) and Gabriel Neves (Estudiantes (LP)) missed the final due to injuries.

=== Details ===
13 December 2025
21:00

Racing	1–1 (a.e.t.)	Estudiantes (LP)
Martínez 80'	Report	Carrillo 90+2'
Penalties
Martínez (penalty scored); Vietto (penalty scored); García Basso (penalty scored); Martirena (penalty missed); Sosa (penalty scored); Pardo (penalty missed)	4–5	(penalty scored) Sosa; (penalty missed) Cetré; (penalty scored) Alario; (penalty scored) Tobio Burgos; (penalty scored) Meza; (penalty scored) Rodríguez

Estadio Único Madre de Ciudades, Santiago del Estero
Attendance: 33,500
Referee: Nicolás Ramírez

**Racing**	**Estudiantes (LP)**

GK	25	(Argentina) Facundo Cambeses
RB	34	(Argentina) Facundo Mura		(substituted off) 86'
CB	23	(Argentina) Nazareno Colombo	(yellow card) 69'
CB	2	(Argentina) Agustín García Basso
LB	27	(Argentina) Gabriel Rojas
RM	5	(Argentina) Juan Nardoni		(substituted off) 100'
CM	13	(Argentina) Santiago Sosa (c)
LM	32	(Argentina) Agustín Almendra		(substituted off) 74'
RW	28	(Argentina) Santiago Solari		(substituted off) 74'
CF	9	(Argentina) Adrián Martínez	(yellow card) 46'
LW	7	(Colombia) Duván Vergara		(substituted off) 86'
Substitutes:
GK	21	(Chile) Gabriel Arias
DF	3	(Argentina) Marco Di Cesare
DF	6	(Argentina) Marcos Rojo
DF	15	(Uruguay) Gastón Martirena		(substituted on) 86'
DF	18	(Argentina) Franco Pardo	(yellow card) 90+4'	(substituted on) 86'
MF	8	(Argentina) Alan Forneris
MF	11	(Argentina) Matías Zaracho
MF	24	(Argentina) Adrián Fernández		(substituted on) 74'
MF	36	(Argentina) Bruno Zuculini		(substituted on) 100'
FW	10	(Argentina) Luciano Vietto			(substituted on) 118'
FW	17	(Argentina) Tomás Conechny		(substituted on) 74'	(substituted off) 118'
FW	77	(Uruguay) Adrián Balboa
Manager:
(Argentina) Gustavo Costas

GK	28	(Uruguay) Fernando Muslera
RB	4	(Argentina) Román Gómez	(yellow card) 33'	(substituted off) 82'
CB	6	(Argentina) Santiago Núñez		(substituted off) 95'
CB	14	(Argentina) Leandro González Pírez
LB	15	(Paraguay) Santiago Arzamendia		(substituted off) 88'
CM	5	(Argentina) Santiago Ascacíbar (c)
CM	21	(Argentina) Ezequiel Piovi		(substituted off) 82'
RW	10	(Uruguay) Tiago Palacios	(yellow card) 41'	(substituted off) 73'
AM	25	(Argentina) Cristian Medina		(substituted off) 88'
LW	18	(Colombia) Edwuin Cetré
CF	9	(Argentina) Guido Carrillo	(yellow card) 36'
Substitutes:
GK	1	(Argentina) Fabricio Iacovich
DF	2	(Argentina) Facundo Rodríguez		(substituted on) 95'
DF	13	(Argentina) Gastón Benedetti	(yellow card) 118'	(substituted on) 88'
DF	20	(Argentina) Eric Meza		(substituted on) 82'
DF	26	(Argentina) Ramiro Funes Mori
MF	7	(Argentina) José Sosa		(substituted on) 88'
MF	11	(Argentina) Facundo Farías
MF	22	(Argentina) Alexis Castro
MF	32	(Argentina) Mikel Amondarain
FW	17	(Argentina) Joaquín Tobio Burgos		(substituted on) 73'
FW	27	(Argentina) Lucas Alario		(substituted on) 82'
FW	29	(Argentina) Fabricio Pérez
Manager:
(Argentina) Eduardo Domínguez

Man of the Match:
(Argentina) Guido Carrillo (Estudiantes (LP))

Assistant referees:
Gabriel Chade
Maximiliano Del Yesso
Fourth official:
Pablo Dóvalo
Fifth official:
Mariana Duré
Video assistant referee:
Héctor Paletta
Assistant video assistant referees:
Hernán Mastrángelo

**Match rules**

- 90 minutes
- 30 minutes of extra time if necessary
- Penalty shoot-out if scores still level
- Twelve named substitutes
- Maximum of five substitutions, with a sixth allowed in extra time

=== Statistics ===
Overall
	Racing	Estudiantes (LP)
Goals scored	1	1
Total shots	14	13
Shots on target	8	8
Ball possession	54%	46%
Corner kicks	5	7
Fouls committed	10	13
Offsides	0	1
Yellow cards	3	4
Red cards	0	0
