= Valente Pierani =

Argentine footballer (born 2006)

Personal information
- Date of birth: 22 February 2006 (age 20)
- Place of birth: San Nicolás de los Arroyos, Argentina
- Height: 1.88 m (6 ft 2 in)
- Position: Centre-back

Team information
- Current team: Estudiantes de La Plata
- Number: 35

Senior career*
| Years | Team | Apps | (Gls) |
| 2024– | Estudiantes de La Plata | 3 | (0) |

International career^{‡}
| 2022–2023 | Argentina U17 | 3 | (0) |
| 2025– | Argentina U20 | 4 | (0) |
Medal record
Men's football
Representing Argentina
FIFA U-20 World Cup
| Runner-up | 2025 Chile |
South American U-20 Championship
| Silver medal – second place | 2025 Venezuela |
South American U-17 Championship
| Bronze medal – third place | 2023 Ecuador |
- * Club domestic league appearances and goals as of 14:02, 19 September 2025 (UTC) ‡ National team caps and goals as of 14:02, 19 September 2025 (UTC)

Valente Pierani (born 22 February 2006) is an Argentine professional footballer who plays as a centre-back for Argentine Primera División club Estudiantes de La Plata.

== Club career ==
Born in the city of San Nicolás de los Arroyos and trained at Club Somisa in that city, Pierani joined Estudiantes de La Plata at the age of 12. In November 2023, he signed his first professional contract.

Pierani was part of the squads that won the 2024 Copa de la Liga Profesional, Trofeo de Campeones de la Liga Profesional and the 2025 Liga Profesional de Fútbol Clausura.

On 19 January 2026, Pierani made his official debut in the Primera División, entering during the second half of Estudiantes' 4–0 victory over Ituzaingó, corresponding to the round of 32 of the 2026 Copa Argentina.

== International career ==
In October 2021, Pierani was called up for the first time by Pablo Aimar to begin training with the Argentina U-17 national team for the South American Championship, which he ultimately did not participate in.

In September 2023, he was again called up to the Argentina under-17 national team by Diego Placente in preparation for the 2023 FIFA U-17 World Cup held in Indonesia.

In July 2024, Pierani was called up by Placente to join the Argentina under-20 national team for the COTIF L'Alcudia youth tournament.

Pierani was named to their 23-man squad for the 2025 South American U-20 Championship on 6 January 2025.

Pierani made the final Argentina U20 squad for the 2025 FIFA U-20 World Cup. After starting the tournament with the team, he was ruled out in the semifinals due to a knee sprain. The Argentine national team finished the tournament as runners-up.

== Personal life ==
Pierani is the son of former footballer Jorge Pierani.

== Honours ==
Estudiantes de La Plata

- AFA Liga Profesional de Fútbol: 2025 Clausura
- Copa de la Liga Profesional: 2024
- Trofeo de Campeones (LPF): 2024, 2025
