= Bautista Kociubinski =

Argentine footballer

Personal information
- Full name: Bautista Kociubinski
- Date of birth: 26 April 2001 (age 25)
- Place of birth: La Plata, Argentina
- Height: 1.81 m (5 ft 11 in)
- Position: Midfielder

Team information
- Current team: Estudiantes de La Plata
- Number: 52

Senior career*
Years	Team	Apps	(Gls)
2021–	Estudiantes	37	(1)
2022	→ Aldosivi (loan)	8	(1)
2023	→ Atlético Tucumán (loan)	21	(2)
2025–2026	→ Montevideo City (loan)	28	(1)
- * Club domestic league appearances and goals as of 17:50, 21 November 2026 (UTC)

Bautista Kociubisnki (born 26 April 2001) is an Argentine professional footballer who plays for Estudiantes in the Argentine Primera División.

== Career ==
In May 2017, at the age of 16, he was called up by coach Nelson Vivas to begin training with the first-team squad. A product of the youth academy at Club Estudiantes de La Plata, he made his first-team debut on September 25, 2021, in a Primera División match that ended in a 1–1 draw against Platense.

In July 2025, he was sent on a one-year loan to Montevideo City Torque of the Uruguayan Primera División, with no loan fee and an option to purchase.

== Honours ==
Estudiantes

- Copa de la Liga Profesional: 2024
- Trofeo de Campeones de la Liga Profesional: 2024
