= Román Gómez (footballer) =

Argentine footballer (born 2004)

Personal information
- Full name: Román Agustín Gómez
- Date of birth: 14 July 2004 (age 22)
- Place of birth: Quilmes, Argentina
- Height: 1.81 m (5 ft 11 in)
- Position: Right-back

Team information
- Current team: Bahia
- Number: 31

Youth career
- Estudiantes

Senior career*
Years	Team	Apps	(Gls)
2024–2025	Estudiantes	27	(1)
2026–	Bahia	22	(1)
- * Club domestic league appearances and goals as of 21:51, 12 November 2026 (UTC)

Román Agustín Gómez (born 14 July 2004) is an Argentine professional footballer who plays as a right-back for Campeonato Brasileiro Série A club Bahia.

== Career ==
=== Estudiantes ===
Born in Quilmes, Gómez played for the youth sides of Estudiantes de La Plata, and made his first team debut on 9 March 2024, starting in a 3–1 Copa de la Liga Profesional away loss to Sarmiento, as his side was already qualified to the following stage. He signed his first professional contract with the club on 10 August, being definitely promoted to the main squad shortly after.

Gómez became a regular starter in the 2025 Clausura Tournament, and scored his first senior goal on 17 August of that year, netting Estudiantes' second in a 3–2 loss at Banfield.

=== Bahia ===
On 8 January 2026, Campeonato Brasileiro Série A side Bahia announced the signing of Gómez on a five-year contract.

== Personal life ==
Gómez is the nephew of former footballer and current manager Pablo Quatrocchi.

== Career statistics ==
As of 12 November 2026

Appearances and goals by club, season and competition
Club	Season	League			Cup (Note: Includes Copa Argentina, Copa do Brasil)		Continental		State league (Note: Includes Campeonato Baiano)		Other		Total	
Club	Season	Division	Apps	Goals	Apps	Goals	Apps	Goals	Apps	Goals	Apps	Goals	Apps	Goals
Estudiantes	2024	Liga Profesional	6	0	0	0	0	0	—		0	0	6	0
Estudiantes	2025	Liga Profesional	21	1	1	0	3 (Note: Appearance(s) in Copa Libertadores)	0	—		1 (Note: Appearance(s) in Trofeo de Campeones de la Liga Profesional)	0	26	1
Estudiantes	Total		27	1	1	0	3	0	—		1	0	32	1
Bahia	2026	Série A	17	1	0	0	2	0	5	0	—		24	1
Career total			44	2	1	0	5	0	5	0	1	0	56	2

== Honours ==
Estudiantes

- Copa de la Liga Profesional: 2024
- Trofeo de Campeones de la Liga Profesional: 2024, 2025
- Liga Profesional de Fútbol: 2025 Clausura

Bahia

- Campeonato Baiano: 2026
