= Matías Mansilla (goalkeeper) =

Argentine footballer

Personal information
- Full name: Matías Lisandro Mansilla
- Date of birth: 15 January 1996 (age 30)
- Place of birth: Los Juríes, Santiago del Estero, Argentina
- Height: 1.92 m (6 ft 4 in)
- Position: Goalkeeper

Team information
- Current team: Unión Santa Fe (on loan from Estudiantes)
- Number: 21

Youth career
- Huracán
- Midland

Senior career*
Years	Team	Apps	(Gls)
2015–2020	Midland	109	(0)
2020–2023	Deportivo Morón	11	(0)
2021–2022	→ Patronato (loan)	17	(0)
2023–2024	Central Córdoba SdE	24	(0)
2024–	Estudiantes	59	(0)
2025	→ Atlético Tucumán (loan)	15	(0)
2026–	→ Unión Santa Fe (loan)	34	(0)
- * Club domestic league appearances and goals as of 17:29, 22 November 2026 (UTC)

Matías Lisandro Mansilla (born 15 January 1996) is an Argentine professional footballer who plays as a goalkeeper for Unión Santa Fe, on loan from Estudiantes.

== Career ==
Mansilla came through the youth setup at Midland, after joining from Huracán. In July 2020, he moved up to the Primera Nacional to join Deportivo Morón, signing a contract until June 2023. In June 2021, he joined Liga Profesional side Patronato on loan for a year and a half. On 30 October 2022, he featured on the bench in the final as Patronato won the 2022 Copa Argentina, beating Talleres 1–0.

Ahead of the 2023 season, he signed for Central Córdoba SdE.

In January 2024, he joined Estudiantes, with the club acquiring 90% of his economic rights on a 3-year contract. On 30 April, Mansilla helped Estudiantes to the final of the Copa de la Liga Profesional, saving two penalties in a shootout against Boca Juniors. In the final on 5 May, Estudiantes won with Mansilla saving three penalties in a shootout victory against Vélez Sarsfield. On 21 December, he started in another final against Vélez Sarsfield, as Estudiantes won 3–0 in the 2024 Trofeo de Campeones.

In July 2025, he was loaned to Atlético Tucumán for 12 months with an option to buy. On 23 July, he played a key role in knocking Boca Juniors out of the Copa Argentina by a score of 2–1.

On 8 January 2026, he was joined Unión Santa Fe, again leaving Estudiantes on loan for a year with an option to buy. On 29 January, he kept a clean sheet on his debut in a 0–0 draw against Platense.

== Honours ==
Patronato

- Copa Argentina: 2022

Estudiantes

- Copa de la Liga Profesional: 2024
- Trofeo de Campeones de la Liga Profesional: 2024
