= Javier Altamirano =

Chilean footballer (born 1999)

Personal information
- Full name: Javier Adolfo Altamirano Altamirano
- Date of birth: 21 September 1999 (age 27)
- Place of birth: Talcahuano, Chile
- Height: 1.72 m (5 ft 8 in)
- Position: Attacking midfielder

Team information
- Current team: Universidad de Chile
- Number: 19

Youth career
- 2011–2017: Huachipato

Senior career*
| Years | Team | Apps | (Gls) |
| 2017–2023 | Huachipato | 149 | (15) |
| 2023–2026 | Estudiantes | 17 | (1) |
| 2025–2026 | → Universidad de Chile (loan) | 26 | (5) |
| 2026– | Universidad de Chile | 7 | (1) |

International career^{‡}
| 2023– | Chile | 8 | (0) |
- * Club domestic league appearances and goals as of 22:28, 14 March 2026 (UTC) ‡ National team caps and goals as of 30 March 2026

Javier Adolfo Altamirano Altamirano (born Javier Adolfo Urzúa Altamirano; 21 September 1999) is a Chilean footballer who plays as an attacking midfielder for Universidad de Chile and the Chile national team.

== Club career ==
Born in Talcahuano, Altamirano is a product of Huachipato's youth system, joining their youth side in 2011, aged 12. He made his professional debut for Huachipato on May 18, 2017, starting in a 1–4 home defeat against Santiago Wanderers in the last match of the 2017 Clausura in Chile. Altamirano would establish himself as a starter for Huachipato during 2018, and scored his first professional goal on October 20, 2018, in a 2–0 home win against Unión La Calera. In a match against Deportes Antofagasta on August 12, 2019, Altamirano scored his first career hattrick during a 4–3 home win at Estadio CAP. He'd make his international club competition debut for Huachipato on February 12, 2020, starting in a 1–0 home win against Deportivo Pasto for the 2020 Copa Sudamericana first stage, in an eventual second round exit. Altamirano was a starter during Huachipato's 2021 Copa Sudamericana campaign, scoring his first club international goal in a 1–1 home draw against Rosario Central in an eventual group stage exit. Altamirano remained a starter for Huachipato during the relegation threatened 2021 and 2022 seasons, and was considered to be Huachipato's best player, and one of the most promising players in Chilean football in 2023.

In August 2023, Altamirano was transferred to Estudiantes, for three and a half years. In January 2025, he was loaned out to Universidad de Chile on a one-year deal. In November 2025, Universidad de Chile announced his purchase on a deal for three years until 2028.

== International career ==
After taking part in training microcycles of Chile's squad at under-23 level, Altamirano made his international debut in a friendly match against Cuba on 11 June 2023 as a starter.

On March 17, 2024, Altamirando suffered an epileptic seizure on the pitch.

== Personal life ==
On 2019, Altamirano changed his surname from Urzúa to Altamirano, to honour his mother and grandparents, who raised him.

== Career statistics ==
=== International ===
As of match played 30 March 2026.

Appearances and goals by national team and year
| National team | Year | Apps | Goals |
|---|---|---|---|
| Chile | 2023 | 1 | 0 |
| Chile | 2025 | 5 | 0 |
| Chile | 2026 | 2 | 0 |
| Total | | 8 | 0 |

== Honours ==
Estudiantes

- Copa Argentina: 2023
- Copa de la Liga Profesional: 2024
- Trofeo de Campeones de la Liga Profesional: 2024
