= Gastón Benedetti =

Argentine footballer

Personal information
- Full name: Gastón Benedetti Taffarel
- Date of birth: 21 March 2001 (age 25)
- Place of birth: Larroque, Entre Ríos, Argentina
- Height: 1.74 m (5 ft 9 in)
- Position: Defender

Team information
- Current team: Estudiantes de La Plata
- Number: 13

Youth career
- 2012-2022: Estudiantes de La Plata

Senior career*
Years	Team	Apps	(Gls)
2022–	Estudiantes	107	(3)
2022	→ Guillermo Brown (loan)	17	(0)
- * Club domestic league appearances and goals as of 17:25, 21 November 2026 (UTC)

Gastón Benedetti Taffarel (born 29 March 2001) is an Argentine professional footballer who plays for Estudiantes in the Argentine Primera División.

== Career ==
From Larroque, Entre Ríos. He joined Estudiantes de La Plata in 2012. In 2018 Benedetti had progressed to the reserve side and was categorised as a left-winger but was beginning to play deeper on occasion as well. He played as Estudiantes won the Youth Super League in 2019. He later became captain of the reserve team.

Benedetti spent the 2022 season on loan at Guillermo Brown in Puerto Madryn, playing seventeen times for them in the Primera Nacional.

In 2023 he was given a place at left-back for Estudiantes by manager Eduardo Dominguez, making his debut in a 3–0 league win over Newells Old Boys on 31 March 2023. He was given a run in the side and they didn't lose in his first eight matches in all competitions, and in his ninth he scored his first and second goals for the club, in a 2–0 win over Velez Sarsfield, with the second goal assisted by debutant Axel Atum.

== Honours ==
Estudiantes

- Copa Argentina: 2023
- Copa de la Liga Profesional: 2024
- Trofeo de Campeones de la Liga Profesional: 2024, 2025
- Primera División: 2025 Clausura
