= Guido Carrillo =

Argentine professional footballer

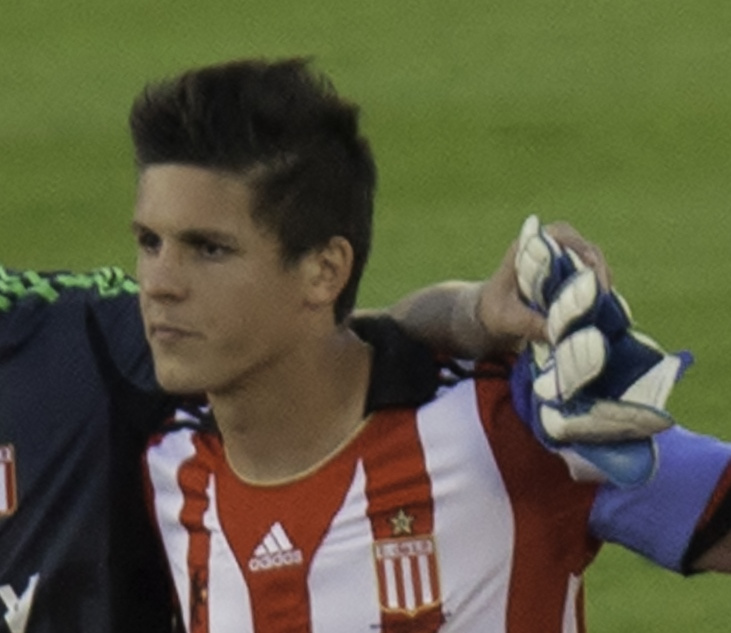
- Carrillo in 2014

Personal information
- Full name: Guido Marcelo Carrillo
- Date of birth: 25 May 1991 (age 35)
- Place of birth: Magdalena, Argentina
- Height: 1.88 m (6 ft 2 in)
- Position: Striker

Team information
- Current team: Estudiantes
- Number: 9

Youth career
- Estudiantes

Senior career*
Years	Team	Apps	(Gls)
2011–2015	Estudiantes	118	(28)
2015–2016	Monaco B	1	(0)
2015–2018	Monaco	65	(15)
2018–2020	Southampton	7	(0)
2018–2020	→ Leganés (loan)	56	(7)
2020–2022	Elche	50	(5)
2022	Henan Songshan Longmen	13	(2)
2023–	Estudiantes	104	(22)
- * Club domestic league appearances and goals as of 17:22, 21 November 2026 (UTC)

Guido Marcelo Carrillo (born 25 May 1991) is an Argentine professional footballer who plays as a striker for Argentine Primera División club Estudiantes, which he captains.

Carrillo is a product of the Estudiantes academy and made his professional debut for the club in 2011. He moved to Monaco in July 2015. Carrillo joined Southampton in January 2018. He had two consecutive loan spells with Leganés. In October 2020, Carrillo joined Elche after his contract was mutually terminated with Southampton. In August 2022, he moved to Henan Songshan Longmen before rejoining Estudiantes in January 2023.

== Club career ==
=== Estudiantes ===
Carrillo played for Estudiantes for most of his early professional career. He was a fan favourite at the Estadio Ciudad de La Plata, having graduated through the youth academy and making his first-team debut in 2011. In February 2015, Estudiantes beat Barcelona Guayaquil 2–0 in their Libertadores Cup opener, played at La Plata “Único” stadium. Guido Carrillo scored three times for the “Pincha”, giving Estudiantes their first three points in the tournament.

=== Monaco ===
On 3 July 2015, Monaco announced the signing of Carrillo on a five-year contract. His former club Estudiantes had previously stated it had agreed a $10 million transfer offer (about €8.8 million). He scored his first goal for the club in a 3–1 away win over BSC Young Boys in the third qualifying round of that season's Champions League.

=== Southampton ===
On 25 January 2018, Carrillo joined Premier League side Southampton for a fee reported to be in the region of £19 million on a three-and-a-half-year deal. He made his first appearance on 27 January as an 80th-minute substitute in a 1–0 victory over Watford in the FA Cup.

On 8 July 2018, Carrillo rejoined former manager Mauricio Pellegrino, when he joined CD Leganés on a season-long loan. On 1 September 2019, he was loaned again to the same club until the end of 2019–20 season. He failed to make much of an impact during his second season with Leganés as the club were relegated from La Liga.

=== Later career ===
On 5 October 2020, Carrillo joined Spanish side Elche CF on a free transfer after an agreement was reached to terminate his contract with Southampton where he made just ten appearances for the club.

On 30 August 2022, Carrillo completed a move to Chinese Super League club Henan Songshan Longmen on a free transfer.

On 10 January 2023, Carrillo rejoined Estudiantes on a contract until December 2024. In September 2024, he signed a two-year contract extension. On 6 September 2026, Carrillo signed another two-year contract extension.

== Career statistics ==
=== Club ===
As of match played 1 November 2026

Appearances and goals by club, season and competition
Club	Season	League			National Cup		League Cup		Continental		Other		Total	
Club	Season	Division	Apps	Goals	Apps	Goals	Apps	Goals	Apps	Goals	Apps	Goals	Apps	Goals
Estudiantes (LP)	2010–11	Primera División	4	0	—		—		—		—		4	0
Estudiantes (LP)	2011–12	Primera División	22	2	1	1	—		—		—		23	3
Estudiantes (LP)	2012–13	Primera División	29	4	1	0	—		—		—		30	4
Estudiantes (LP)	2013–14	Primera División	37	13	3	1	—		—		—		40	14
Estudiantes (LP)	2014	Primera División	16	5	0	0	—		6	3	—		22	8
Estudiantes (LP)	2015	Primera División	11	4	1	2	—		10	7	—		22	13
Estudiantes (LP)	Total		118	28	6	4	0	0	16	10	0	0	140	42
Monaco B	2015–16	Championnat de France Amateur	1	0	—								1	0
Monaco	2015–16	Ligue 1	31	4	2	0	0	0	7	1	—		40	5
Monaco	2016–17	Ligue 1	19	7	2	1	2	0	8	0	—		31	8
Monaco	2017–18	Ligue 1	15	4	1	3	2	1	5	0	1	0	24	8
Monaco	Total		65	15	5	4	4	1	20	1	1	0	95	21
Southampton	2017–18	Premier League	7	0	3	0	0	0	—		—		10	0
Leganés (loan)	2018–19	La Liga	32	6	1	0	—		—		—		33	6
Leganés (loan)	2019–20	La Liga	24	1	3	3	—		—		—		27	4
Leganés (loan)	Total		56	7	4	3	0	0	0	0	0	0	60	10
Elche	2020–21	La Liga	21	3	1	0	—		—		—		22	3
Elche	2021–22	La Liga	29	2	3	2	—		—		—		32	4
Elche	Total		50	5	4	2	0	0	0	0	0	0	54	7
Henan Songshan Longmen	2022	Chinese Super League	13	2	0	0	—		—		—		13	2
Estudiantes (LP)	2023	Primera Divisíon	17	1	3	2	4	1	8	4	1 (Note: Appearance in Supercopa Argentina)	0	33	8
Estudiantes (LP)	2024	Primera División	19	7	1	0	12	5	4	1	1 (Note: Appearance in Trofeo de Campeones de la Liga Profesional)	0	37	13
Estudiantes (LP)	2025	Primera División	28	4	0	0	1	0	8	2	2 (Note: Appearance in Trofeo de Campeones de la Liga Profesional and Supercopa Internacional)	0	39	6
Estudiantes (LP)	2026	Primera División	24	4	4	3	0	0	12	3	0	0	40	10
Estudiantes (LP)	Total		88	16	8	5	17	6	32	10	4	0	149	37
Career total			398	73	30	18	21	7	68	21	5	0	522	119

== Honours ==
Monaco

- Ligue 1: 2016–17

Estudiantes

- Copa Argentina: 2023
- Copa de la Liga Profesional: 2024
- Trofeo de Campeones de la Liga Profesional: 2024, 2025
- Primera División: 2025 Clausura
