= José Sosa =

Argentine footballer (born 1985)

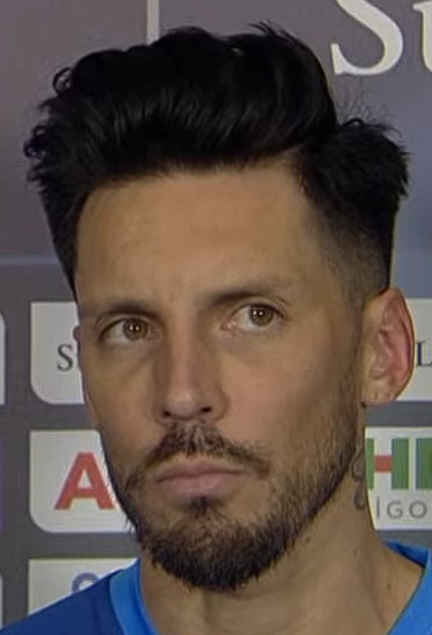
- Sosa playing for Fenerbahçe in 2021

Personal information
- Full name: José Ernesto Sosa
- Date of birth: 19 June 1985 (age 41)
- Place of birth: Carcarañá, Argentina
- Height: 1.81 m (5 ft 11 in)
- Position: Midfielder

Team information
- Current team: Estudiantes
- Number: 7

Youth career
- CA Carcarañá
- Estudiantes

Senior career*
Years	Team	Apps	(Gls)
2002–2007	Estudiantes	142	(12)
2007–2010	Bayern Munich	35	(2)
2010	→ Estudiantes (loan)	17	(3)
2010–2011	Napoli	24	(1)
2011–2014	Metalist Kharkiv	64	(17)
2014	→ Atlético Madrid (loan)	15	(0)
2014	→ Beşiktaş (loan)	3	(0)
2014–2016	Beşiktaş	55	(12)
2016–2018	AC Milan	18	(0)
2017–2018	→ Trabzonspor (loan)	25	(0)
2018–2020	Trabzonspor	56	(14)
2020–2022	Fenerbahçe	53	(4)
2022–	Estudiantes	106	(7)

International career^{‡}
2003	Argentina U20	4	(0)
2008	Argentina Olympic	5	(0)
2005–2013	Argentina	19	(1)
Medal record
Representing Argentina
Men's Football
Gold medal – first place	2008 Beijing	Team competition
- * Club domestic league appearances and goals as of 16:33, 18 October 2026 (UTC) ‡ National team caps and goals as of 15 October 2013

José Ernesto Sosa (born 19 June 1985) is an Argentine professional footballer who plays as a midfielder for Argentina Primera Division club Estudiantes de La Plata. He also represented the Argentina national team.

== Club career ==
=== Estudiantes ===
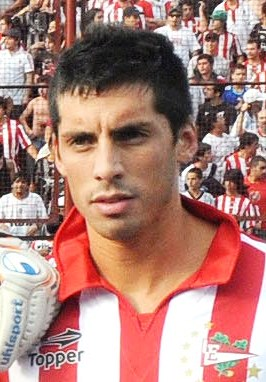
Sosa with Estudiantes

Sosa played for Estudiantes between 2002 and 2007. He was a favorite of interim coach Carlos Bilardo, and together with Marcelo Carrusca started helping the team improve their standing in the Argentine league. The highlight of his tenure with Estudiantes was being a key piece in the 7–0 defeat of derby rivals Gimnasia on 15 October 2006, and then his role in helping the team win their first league title since 1983 by scoring the equalizing goal from a free kick against Boca Juniors in the 2006 Apertura final playoff game.

=== Bayern Munich ===
On 24 February 2007, a deal was announced between Estudiantes and Bayern Munich, in which Sosa would be transferred to Bayern Munich for an undisclosed fee. Sosa stayed with Estudiantes for the remainder of the Clausura 2007 tournament.

On 29 October 2009, Bayern Munich announced that the Argentine midfielder will be loaned to his former club Estudiantes for the remainder of the season, even though he was not registered to play the 2009 World Club Championship finals.

=== Napoli ===
On 30 August 2010, Sosa joined Italian side Napoli for €2 million fee (including €100,000 solidarity contribution to youth clubs of Sosa), signing a four-year deal.

=== Metalist Kharkiv ===
On 26 July 2011, it was announced that Jose Sosa had joined the Ukrainian team Metalist Kharkiv for €1.9 million. For his tenure with Metalist, Sosa adopted the number 11 jersey honoring his admired ex-teammate Juan Sebastián Verón, and has been instrumental in the team's successful Europa League campaign. On 28 June 2012, Sosa was named as the new captain of FC Metalist Kharkiv.

On 1 January 2014, it was announced that he will join Atlético Madrid on six-month loan. With the Spaniards, he won the Spanish Liga and played in the 2014 UEFA Champions League Final against Real Madrid, coming on as a substitute, as Atlético lost 4–1 after extra time.

=== Beşiktaş ===
On 31 August 2014, Sosa was signed by Turkish club Beşiktaş on loan from Metalist Kharkiv. On 15 October 2014, the club announced that the buying option has been used, making Sosa's move to the Turkish side definitive, for €3.4 million. In the 2015–16 season, Sosa served 12 assists in 2015–16 Süper Lig, at least 4 more than any other player.

=== AC Milan ===
On 17 August 2016, Sosa joined Italian club AC Milan for €7.5 million fee, signing a two-year deal. He made his debut for Milan on 27 August 2016, coming off the bench in the 80th minute during a 4–2 loss away against his former club Napoli.

Following Riccardo Montolivo's long-term injury sustained in October 2016, Sosa assumed the role of a deep-lying playmaker, alternatively known as regista, operating in front of the team's defense line in 4–3–3 formation. Adapting to the change of position from his usual attacking midfielder role, he cited Juan Sebastián Verón as inspiration.

=== Trabzonspor ===
On 8 September 2017, Sosa moved back to Turkey, joining Süper Lig club Trabzonspor on loan with an option to make the deal permanent until 2020. On 15 January 2018, Trabzonspor exercised the option and paid a €3.4 million fee to Milan.

=== Fenerbahçe ===
On 22 August 2020, Sosa signed a two-year contract with another Süper Lig club, Fenerbahçe. He made his debut for Fenerbahçe on 11 September 2020, coming off the bench in the 77th minute against Çaykur Rizespor, and scored from the penalty spot in 87th minute.

=== Return to Estudiantes de La Plata ===
On 9 August 2022, Sosa returned to his youth club Estudiantes de la Plata to play for a third time, signing a contract binding him to the club until June 2024.

== International career ==
Sosa played for Argentina Under-20 team during the 2003 FIFA World Youth Championship.

National coach Alfio Basile drafted Sosa for the senior national team on 28 February 2007. Sosa said to the press that he will "never forget this Tuesday" in which he achieved two of his childhood dreams (the transfer to a major European club and the call to the national team).

He made his debut as a substitute at a friendly match against Mexico on 9 March 2007. He started his first match against Chile, on 18 April 2007. His first goal with the Albiceleste arrived on 23 January 2010, in a 3–2 win in a friendly match against Costa Rica, scoring the opening goal of the game with a header on 10 minutes.

Sosa was not called to the World Cup 2010 team by then-manager Diego Maradona, but was reinstated by new coach Alejandro Sabella for the World Cup 2014 qualifiers, and has been featured in several games since 2011.

== Career statistics ==
=== Club ===
As of match played on 22 October 2026.

Appearances and goals by club, season and competition
Club	Season	League			Cup		Continental		Other		Total	
Club	Season	Division	Apps	Goals	Apps	Goals	Apps	Goals	Apps	Goals	Apps	Goals
Estudiantes	2002–03	Primera División	7	1	—		—		—		7	1
Estudiantes	2003–04	Primera División	28	1	—		—		—		28	1
Estudiantes	2004–05	Primera División	33	4	—		—		—		33	4
Estudiantes	2005–06	Primera División	36	3	—		12 (Note: Appearances in Copa Libertadores)	0	—		48	3
Estudiantes	2006–07	Primera División	38	3	—		—		—		38	3
Estudiantes	Total		142	12	—		12	0	—		154	12
Bayern Munich	2007–08	Bundesliga	15	0	3	0	6 (Note: Appearances in UEFA Europa League)	0	1 (Note: Appearance in the DFL-Ligapokal)	0	25	0
Bayern Munich	2008–09	Bundesliga	17	2	1	0	3 (Note: Appearances in UEFA Champions League)	0	—		21	2
Bayern Munich	2009–10	Bundesliga	3	0	2	0	1	0	—		6	0
Bayern Munich	2010–11	Bundesliga	0	0	0	0	—		1 (Note: Appearance in the DFL-Supercup)	0	1	0
Bayern Munich	Total		35	2	6	0	10	0	2	0	53	2
Estudiantes (loan)	2009–10	Primera División	17	3	—		9	2	—		26	5
Napoli	2010–11	Serie A	24	1	1	0	6	0	—		31	1
Metalist Kharkiv	2011–12	Ukrainian Premier League	26	5	0	0	12	2	—		38	7
Metalist Kharkiv	2012–13	Ukrainian Premier League	21	7	0	0	7	0	—		28	7
Metalist Kharkiv	2013–14	Ukrainian Premier League	17	5	1	0	2	0	—		20	5
Metalist Kharkiv	Total		64	17	1	0	21	2	—		86	19
Atlético Madrid (loan)	2013–14	La Liga	15	0	4	0	5	0	—		24	0
Beşiktaş	2014–15	Süper Lig	27	5	3	0	7	0	—		37	5
Beşiktaş	2015–16	Süper Lig	31	7	5	1	5	1	—		41	9
Beşiktaş	Total		58	12	8	1	12	1	—		78	14
Milan	2016–17	Serie A	18	0	1	0	—		0	0	19	0
Trabzonspor	2017–18	Süper Lig	25	0	2	0	—		—		27	0
Trabzonspor	2018–19	Süper Lig	29	5	1	0	—		—		30	5
Trabzonspor	2019–20	Süper Lig	29	9	6	1	7	1	—		42	11
Trabzonspor	Total		83	14	9	1	7	1	—		99	16
Fenerbahçe	2020–21	Süper Lig	34	4	2	0	—		—		36	4
Fenerbahçe	2021–22	Süper Lig	19	0	0	0	8	0	—		27	0
Fenerbahçe	Total		53	4	2	0	8	0	—		63	4
Estudiantes	2022	Primera División	2	0	—		0	0	—		2	0
Estudiantes	2023	Primera División	29	3	6	0	7 (Note: Appearances in Copa Sudamericana)	0	—		42	3
Estudiantes	2024	Primera División	37	3	2	0	6	0	2 (Note: One appearance in Supercopa Argentina, one appearance in Trofeo de Campeones de la Superliga Argentina)	0	47	3
Estudiantes	2025	Primera División	24	1	2	0	8	0	1 (Note: Appearance in Trofeo de Campeones de la Superliga Argentina)	0	35	1
Estudiantes	2026	Primera División	14	0	3	0	3	0	0	0	20	0
Estudiantes	Total		106	7	13	0	24	0	3	0	146	7
Career Total			615	72	45	2	114	6	5	0	779	80

=== International ===
As of 15 October 2013

Argentina
Year	Apps	Goals
2005	1	0
2006	0	0
2007	1	0
2008	3	0
2009	0	0
2010	1	1
2011	7	0
2012	5	0
2013	1	0
Total	19	1

No.	Date	Venue	Opponent	Score	Result	Competition	Ref.
1	26 January 2010	San Juan, Argentina	Costa Rica	1–0	3–2	Friendly	

== Honours ==
Estudiantes de La Plata

- Argentine Primera División: Apertura 2006, Clausura 2025
- Copa Argentina: 2023
- Copa de la Liga Profesional: 2024
- Trofeo de Campeones de la Liga Profesional: 2024, 2025

Bayern Munich

- Bundesliga: 2007–08
- DFB-Pokal: 2007–08
- DFL-Ligapokal: 2007
- DFL-Supercup: 2010

Atlético Madrid

- La Liga: 2013–14

Beşiktaş

- Süper Lig: 2015–16

Milan

- Supercoppa Italiana: 2016

Trabzonspor

- Turkish Cup: 2019–20

Argentina

- Summer Olympics Gold Medal: 2008

Individual

- Süper Lig top assists: 2015–16 (12 assists)
