= 2024 Trofeo de Campeones de la Liga Profesional =

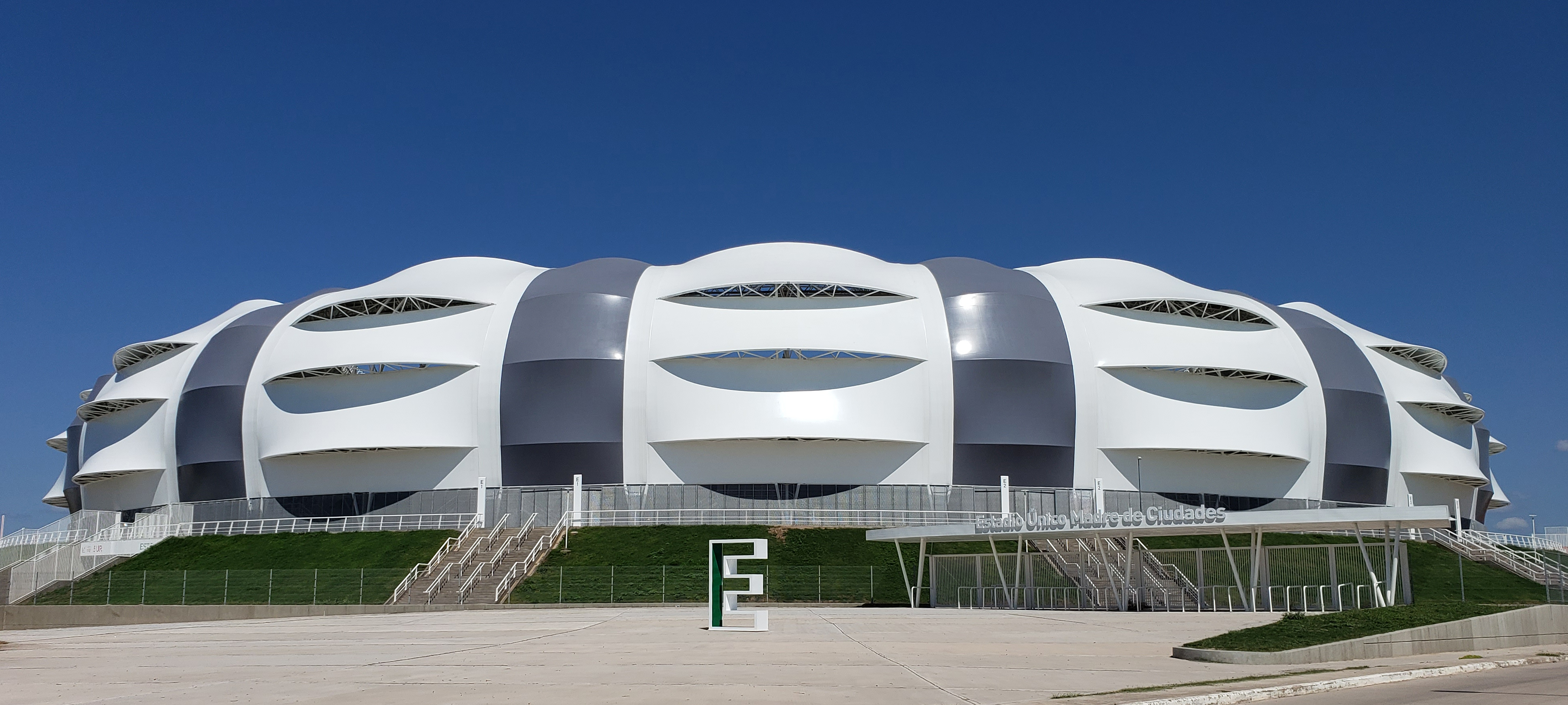
- Estadio Único Madre de Ciudades, venue
- Event: Trofeo de Campeones (LPF)
Vélez Sarsfield	Estudiantes (LP)
0	3
- Date: December 21, 2024
- Venue: Estadio Único Madre de Ciudades, Santiago del Estero
- Man of the Match: Enzo Pérez (Estudiantes (LP))
- Referee: Leandro Rey Hilfer

The 2024 Trofeo de Campeones de la Liga Profesional (officially the Trofeo de Campeones Betano 2024 for sponsorship reasons) was the fifth edition of the Trofeo de Campeones de la Liga Profesional, an annual football match contested by the winners of Primera División and Copa de la Liga Profesional competitions, similar to the defunct Trofeo de Campeones de la Superliga Argentina.

The final was contested by Vélez Sarsfield (2024 Primera División champions) and Estudiantes (LP) (2024 Copa de la Liga Profesional champions) on 21 December 2024 at Estadio Único Madre de Ciudades in Santiago del Estero.

Estudiantes (LP) defeated Vélez Sarsfield 3–0 to win their first title.

== Qualified teams ==
Team	Qualification	Previous app.
Vélez Sarsfield	2024 Primera División champions	(none)
Estudiantes (LP)	2024 Copa LPF champions	(none)

== Match details ==
Coach Gustavo Quinteros (Vélez Sarsfield) was not on the bench due to his daughter's wedding. He was replaced by assistant coach Leandro Desábato.

Thiago Fernández (Vélez Sarsfield) missed the match because of an ACL injury to his right knee.

21 December 2024
21:00

Vélez Sarsfield	0–3	Estudiantes (LP)
	Report	Marchiori 24' (o.g.); Manyoma 28'; Carrillo 76'

Estadio Único Madre de Ciudades, Santiago del Estero
Referee: Leandro Rey Hilfer

Vélez Sarsfield	Estudiantes (LP)

GK	1	(Argentina) Tomás Marchiori
DF	4	(Argentina) Joaquín García
DF	2	(Argentina) Emanuel Mammana
DF	31	(Argentina) Valentín Gómez
DF	3	(Argentina) Elías Gómez	(yellow card) 55'
MF	32	(Argentina) Christian Ordóñez
MF	26	(Argentina) Agustín Bouzat (c)	(yellow card) 27'	(substituted off) 76'
MF	28	(Argentina) Maher Carrizo		(substituted off) 75'
MF	22	(Argentina) Claudio Aquino
MF	20	(Argentina) Francisco Pizzini		(substituted off) 59'
FW	9	(Argentina) Braian Romero
Substitutes:
GK	12	(Uruguay) Randall Rodríguez
DF	6	(Argentina) Aarón Quirós
DF	14	(Argentina) Agustín Lagos
DF	19	(Argentina) Leonel Roldán
DF	23	(Argentina) Patricio Pernicone
DF	34	(Argentina) Damián Fernández
MF	5	(Syria) Jalil Elías
MF	35	(Argentina) Santiago Cáseres
FW	7	(Uruguay) Michael Santos		(substituted in) 59'
FW	11	(Argentina) Matías Pellegrini		(substituted in) 76'
FW	36	(Argentina) Álvaro Montoro		(substituted in) 75'
FW	47	(Argentina) Benjamín Bosch
Manager:
(Argentina) Leandro Desábato (assistant)

GK	12	(Argentina) Matías Mansilla
DF	20	(Argentina) Eric Meza	(yellow card) 41'
DF	14	(Uruguay) Sebastián Boselli
DF	26	(Argentina) Luciano Lollo
DF	13	(Argentina) Gastón Benedetti
MF	22	(Argentina) Enzo Pérez
MF	5	(Argentina) Santiago Ascacíbar (c)
MF	19	(Colombia) Alexis Manyoma		(substituted off) 74'
MF	32	(Uruguay) Tiago Palacios		(substituted off) 81'
MF	38	(Argentina) Joaquín Tobio Burgos	(yellow card) 64'	(substituted off) 69'
FW	9	(Argentina) Guido Carrillo	(yellow card) 78'	(substituted off) 81'
Substitutes:
GK	1	(Argentina) Fabricio Iacovich
DF	2	(Argentina) Facundo Rodríguez
DF	6	(Argentina) Federico Fernández
DF	15	(Paraguay) Santiago Arzamendia
DF	31	(Argentina) Román Gómez
MF	7	(Argentina) José Sosa		(substituted in) 81'
MF	8	(Uruguay) Gabriel Neves		(substituted in) 74'
MF	17	(Chile) Javier Altamirano
MF	24	(Argentina) Bautista Kociubinski
FW	10	(Argentina) Pablo Piatti	(yellow card) 83'	(substituted in) 69'
FW	18	(Colombia) Edwuin Cetré
FW	23	(Argentina) Luciano Giménez		(substituted in) 81'
Manager:
(Argentina) Eduardo Domínguez

Player of the Match:
Enzo Pérez (Estudiantes (LP))

Assistant referees:
Facundo Rodríguez
Sebastián Raineri
Fourth official:
Andrés Gariano
Fifth official:
Iván Aliende
Video assistant referee:
Hernán Mastrángelo
Assistant video assistant referees:
Juan Del Fueyo

Match rules

- 90 minutes
- 30 minutes of extra time if necessary
- Penalty shoot-out if scores still level
- Twelve named substitutes
- Maximum of five substitutions, with a sixth allowed in extra time

=== Statistics ===
Overall
	Vélez Sarsfield	Estudiantes (LP)
Goals scored	0	3
Total shots	16	17
Shots on target	14	10
Ball possession	64%	36%
Corner kicks	3	5
Fouls committed	7	12
Offsides	2	1
Yellow cards	2	4
Red cards	0	0
