= Eric Meza =

Argentine professional footballer

Personal information
- Full name: Eric Exequiel Meza
- Date of birth: 8 April 1999 (age 27)
- Place of birth: Santa Fe, Argentina
- Height: 1.76 m (5 ft 9 in)
- Position: Right-back

Team information
- Current team: Estudiantes
- Number: 20

Youth career
- Unión Santa Fe
- 2009–2020: Colón

Senior career*
Years	Team	Apps	(Gls)
2020–2023	Colón	93	(7)
2024–	Estudiantes	79	(2)
- * Club domestic league appearances and goals as of 17:31, 21 November 2026 (UTC)

Eric Exequiel Meza (born 8 April 1999) is an Argentine professional footballer who plays as a right-back for Estudiantes.

== Career ==
Born in Santa Fe, Meza joined Colón's youth categories in 2009, from city rivals Unión de Santa Fe. After eleven years in their academy, manager Eduardo Domínguez moved him into the first-team squad in 2020.

After being an unused substitute in several 2020 Copa de la Liga Profesional group stage matches, Meza made his first team debut on 28 November 2020, replacing Gonzalo Piovi in a 2–1 defeat to Independiente at the Estadio Brigadier General Estanislao López. The following 12 January, he signed his first professional contract with the club, after agreeing to a three-year deal.

Meza became a regular starter for Colón during the 2021 season, and scored his first senior goal on 13 August of that year, in a 1–0 home win over Gimnasia y Esgrima La Plata. He scored another three goals during that year, as his side qualified to the Copa Libertadores.

Meza was still a first-choice ahead of Jonathan Sandoval and Augusto Schott during the 2022 campaign, but suffered an injury in September of that year which sidelined him for the remainder of the tournament.

== Career statistics ==
As of 29 November 2020.

Appearances and goals by club, season and competition
Club	Season	League			Cup (Note: Includes the Copa Argentina)		Continental (Note: Includes the Copa Libertadores)		Other (Note: Includes the Trofeo de Campeones de la Liga Profesional)		Total	
Club	Season	Division	Apps	Goals	Apps	Goals	Apps	Goals	Apps	Goals	Apps	Goals
Colón	2020–21	Primera División	3 (Note: Soccerway counts Copa de la Liga Profesional appearances as league appearances.)	0	2	0	—		—		5	0
Colón	2021	Primera División	31	4	—		—		1	0	32	4
Colón	2022	Primera División	24	0	2	0	8	1	—		34	1
Colón	2023	Primera División	18	1	1	0	—		—		19	1
Career total			76	5	5	0	8	1	1	0	90	6

== Honours ==
Estudiantes

- Copa de la Liga Profesional: 2024
- Trofeo de Campeones de la Liga Profesional: 2024, 2025
- Primera División: 2025 Clausura
