= Joaquín Tobio Burgos =

Argentine footballer

Personal information
- Full name: Joaquín Tobio Burgos
- Date of birth: 14 December 2004 (age 21)
- Place of birth: Chascomús, Buenos Aires Province, Argentina
- Height: 1.77 m (5 ft 10 in)
- Position: Forward

Team information
- Current team: Estudiantes
- Number: 17

Youth career
- Tiro Federal Chacosmús
- Club Atlético Chacosmús
- 2022–2024: Estudiantes

Senior career*
Years	Team	Apps	(Gls)
2024–	Estudiantes	49	(6)
- * Club domestic league appearances and goals as of 17:28, 21 November 2026 (UTC)

Joaquín Tobio Burgos (born 14 December 2004) is an Argentine professional footballer who plays as a forward for Argentine Primera División club Estudiantes.

== Career ==
=== Early career ===
Tobio Burgos played for the youth teams of Tiro Federal Chacosmús and Club Atlético Chacosmús, before having unsuccessful trials at River Plate, Argentinos Juniors and Defensa y Justicia. In 2022, he joined Estudiantes.

=== Estudiantes ===
In April 2024, he was included in the Estudiantes squad for the Copa Libertadores. He signed his first professional contract with the club on 15 August, lasting until the end of 2026. He made his Liga Profesional debut on October, coming on as a substitute in the 67th minute of a 2–1 win against Banfield, scoring his side's second goal of the game. On 11 November, he scored again in a 1–1 draw against San Lorenzo. His good performances earned him a starting position for the Trofeo de Campeones de la Liga Profesional on 21 December, which Estudiantes won 3–0 against Vélez Sarsfield.

He scored in this first game of the 2025 Apertura in a 3–1 win against Unión de Santa Fe. He missed a significant portion of the second half of the season after suffering a pelvic stress fracture. In December, he helped his club to winning the Clausura and Trofeo de Campeones de la Liga Profesional titles, scoring a penalty in the shootout after coming off the bench in the former and starting the latter.

On 11 August 2026, he scored his first goal in continental competition in a 1–1 draw in the round of 16 of the Copa Libertadores against Universidad Católica.

== Career statistics ==
As of 24 September 2026

Appearances and goals by club, season and competition
Club	Season	League			Cup (Note: Includes Copa Argentina)		Continental		Other		Total	
Club	Season	Division	Goals	Apps	Apps	Goals	Apps	Goals	Apps	Goals	Apps	Goals
Estudiantes	2024	Liga Profesional	10	2	—		—		1 (Note: Appearance in Trofeo de Campeones de la Liga Profesional)	0	11	2
Estudiantes	2025	Liga Profesional	17	3	2	1	3 (Note: Appearance(s) in Copa Libertadores)	0	1	0	23	4
Estudiantes	2026	Liga Profesional	18	1	3	0	6	1	—		27	2
Estudiantes	Total		45	6	5	1	9	1	2	0	59	8
Career total			45	6	5	1	9	1	2	0	59	8

== Honours ==
Estudiantes

- Trofeo de Campeones: 2024, 2025
- Primera División: 2025 Clausura
- Supercopa Argentina: 2025
