= 2026 Estudiantes de La Plata season =

Estudiantes de La Plata
2026 season
- Manager: Alexander Medina
- Stadium: Estadio Jorge Luis Hirschi
- Primera División: Torneo Apertura: 1st
- Copa Libertadores: Group stage
- Top goalscorer: League: All: Tiago Palacios (5)

The 2026 season is the 121st season of Club Estudiantes de La Plata, where it competes in Primera División, Copa Argentina, and Copa Libertadores.

== Transfers ==
=== In ===
Pos.	Player	Transferred from	Fee	Date	Source
FW	(Argentina) Adolfo Gaich	(Russia) Krylia Sovetov Samara	Loan return	14 January 2026	
DF	(Argentina) Eros Mancuso	(Brazil) Fortaleza	Loan	22 January 2026	
MF	(Argentina) Brian Aguirre	(Argentina) Boca Juniors	Loan	27 January 2026	
DF	(Argentina) Tomás Palacios	(Italy) Inter Milan	Loan	27 January 2026	

== Competitions ==
=== Overall record ===
Competition	First match	Last match	Starting round	Record							
Competition	First match	Last match	Starting round	Pld	W	D	L	GF	GA	GD	Win %
Primera División	2026		Matchday 1	0	0	0	0	0	0	+0	—
Copa Libertadores	8 April 2026			0	0	0	0	0	0	+0	—
Total				0	0	0	0	0	0	+0	—

Last updated: 25 April 2026
Source: Competitions

=== Primera División ===
==== Torneo Apertura ====
Pos	Team	Pld	W	D	L	GF	GA	GD	Pts	Qualification
1	Estudiantes (LP)	16	9	4	3	19	7	+12	31	Advance to round of 16
2	Boca Juniors	16	8	6	2	22	9	+13	30	Advance to round of 16
3	Vélez Sarsfield	16	7	7	2	18	12	+6	28	Advance to round of 16
4	Talleres (C)	16	7	5	4	17	13	+4	26	Advance to round of 16
5	Independiente	16	6	6	4	24	20	+4	24	Advance to round of 16

Source: AFA

===== Results by round =====
Round	1	2	3	4	5	6	7
Ground	H	A	H	A	H	A	H
Result	L	W	W	L	W	W	D
Position							

Updated to match(es) played on 25 April 2026. Source:
A = Away; H = Home; W = Win; D = Draw; L = Loss

13 March 2026 10	Estudiantes	0–1	Lanús
20:00

17 March 2026 11	Gimnasia de Mendoza	1–2	Estudiantes
21:15

23 March 2026 12	Estudiantes	5–0	Central Córdoba
19:00

3 April 2026 13	San Lorenzo	1–0	Estudiantes
19:30

11 April 2026 14	Estudiantes	2–1	Unión
17:15

18 April 2026 15	Instituto	0–1	Estudiantes
17:15

25 April 2026 16	Estudiantes	0–0	Talleres
17:00

=== Copa Libertadores ===
==== Group stage ====
Group A

Pos	Team	Pld	W	D	L	GF	GA	GD	Pts	Qualification
1	(Brazil) Flamengo	6	5	1	0	14	2	+12	16	Advance to round of 16
2	(Argentina) Estudiantes	6	2	3	1	6	5	+1	9	Advance to round of 16
3	(Colombia) Independiente Medellín	6	2	1	3	6	11	−5	7	Transfer to Copa Sudamericana
4	(Peru) Cusco	6	0	1	5	4	12	−8	1	

Source: CONMEBOL
Rules for classification: 1) Points; 2) Head-to-head points; 3) Head-to-head goal difference; 4) Head-to-head goals scored; 5) Goal difference; 6) Goals scored; 7) Red cards; 8) Yellow cards; 9) Drawing of lots.

Round	1	2	3
Ground	A	H	H
Result	D	W	
Position			

A = Away; H = Home; W = Win; D = Draw; L = Loss

8 April 2026 1	Independiente Medellín (Colombia)	1–1	(Argentina) Estudiantes	Colombia
19:00 UTC−5

14 April 2026 2	Estudiantes (Argentina)	2–1	(Peru) Cusco
19:00 UTC−3	Farías 28'; Palacios 48'		Colitto 31'

29 April 2026 3	Estudiantes (Argentina)	1–1	(Brazil) Flamengo	La Plata
21:30 UTC−5	Carrillo 55'		Luiz Araújo 33'	Stadium: Estadio Jorge Luis Hirschi; Referee: Piero Maza (Chile)
