= Luciano Giménez =

Argentine footballer

Personal information
- Full name: Luciano Giménez Alanda
- Date of birth: 18 February 2000 (age 26)
- Place of birth: Salta, Argentina
- Height: 1.87 m (6 ft 2 in)
- Position: Forward

Team information
- Current team: Platense (on loan from Estudiantes)
- Number: 20

Youth career
- Central Norte
- 2016–2020: Boca Juniors

Senior career*
Years	Team	Apps	(Gls)
2020–2023	Boca Juniors	0	(0)
2020–2021	→ Central Norte (loan)	26	(5)
2022	→ Chaco For Ever (loan)	30	(2)
2023	→ Chacarita Juniors (loan)	33	(13)
2024	Cuiabá	11	(1)
2024–	Estudiantes	22	(2)
2025–2026	→ Huracán (loan)	18	(2)
2026–	→ Platense (loan)	4	(1)
- * Club domestic league appearances and goals as of 17:13, 22 November 2026 (UTC)

Luciano Giménez Alanda (born 18 February 2000) is an Argentine professional footballer who plays as a forward for Platense, on loan from Estudiantes.

== Career ==
Born in Salta, Giménez joined Boca Juniors' youth setup in April 2016, from hometown side Central Norte. On 13 November 2020, after finishing his formation, he returned to his previous club on loan.

After making his senior debut with Central in the 2020 Torneo Federal A, Giménez moved to Primera Nacional side Chaco For Ever on 8 February 2022, also on loan. He was regularly used by his new side, but only scored twice in 30 appearances.

On 5 January 2023, Giménez agreed to a deal with Chacarita Juniors also in the second division, still owned by Boca. On 27 November, after being the club's top goalscorer during the season with 13 goals, Chacarita bought 50% of his economic rights for a rumoured fee of US$ 500,000.

On 7 February 2024, Giménez was announced at Campeonato Brasileiro Série A side Cuiabá on a four-year contract.

On 19 July 2024, Giménez returned to Argentina to sign for Primera División club Estudiantes. On 15 July 2025, he joined Huracán on a year-long loan.

== Career statistics ==
As of 22 August 2024.

Club statistics
Club	Season	League			Cup		Continental		State league		Other		Total	
Club	Season	Division	Apps	Goals	Apps	Goals	Apps	Goals	Apps	Goals	Apps	Goals	Apps	Goals
Central Norte	2020	Torneo Federal A	7	1	—		—		—		—		7	1
Central Norte	2021	Torneo Federal A	19	4	—		—		—		—		19	4
Central Norte	Total		26	5	—		—		—		—		26	5
Chaco For Ever	2022	Primera Nacional	30	2	0	0	—		—		—		30	2
Chacarita Juniors	2023	Primera Nacional	33	13	1	0	—		—		—		34	13
Cuiabá Esporte Clube	2024	Série A	6	0	1	0	3 (Note: Appearance(s) in Copa Sudamericana)	0	5 (Note: Appearance(s) in Campeonato Mato-Grossense)	1	3 (Note: Appearance(s) in Copa Verde)	1	18	2
Estudiantes	2024	Primera División	5	0	—		—		—		—		5	0
Career total			100	20	2	0	3	0	5	1	3	1	113	22

== Honours ==
Estudiantes

- Trofeo de Campeones de la Liga Profesional: 2024
- Primera División: 2025 Clausura
