= Edwuin Cetré =

Colombian footballer (born 1998)

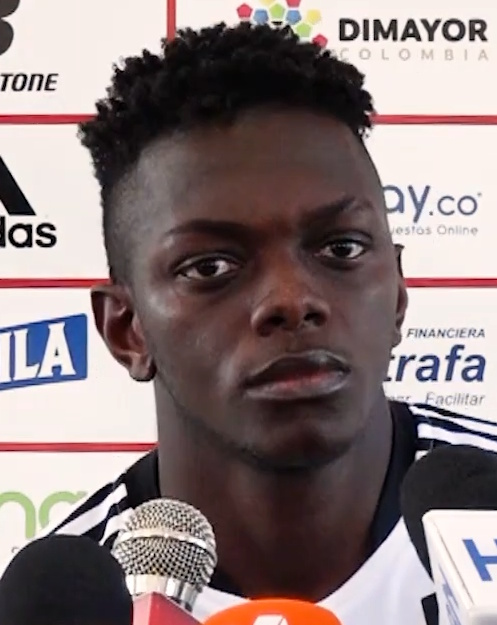
- Cetré in 2023

Personal information
- Full name: Edwuin Steven Cetré Angulo
- Date of birth: 1 January 1998 (age 28)
- Place of birth: Valle del Cauca, Colombia
- Height: 1.74 m (5 ft 9 in)
- Position: Midfielder

Team information
- Current team: Estudiantes de La Plata
- Number: 18

Youth career
- –2015: Boca Juniors de Cali

Senior career*
Years	Team	Apps	(Gls)
2016	Rocha	9	(1)
2017–2018	Santos Laguna Premier	27	(6)
2018–2019	Santos Laguna	15	(1)
2019–2022	Atlético Junior	161	(21)
2023–2024	Independiente Medellín	68	(20)
2024–	Estudiantes	95	(13)

International career^{‡}
2013	Colombia U15	2	(1)
2014–2015	Colombia U17	8	(2)
2020	Colombia U23	7	(4)
- * Club domestic league appearances and goals as of 17:29, 21 November 2026 (UTC) ‡ National team caps and goals as of 20 February 2020

Edwuin Steven Cetré Angulo (born 1 January 1998), is a Colombian footballer who currently plays as a winger for Estudiantes de La Plata.

== Club career ==
Cetré joined Uruguayan Segunda División side Rocha F.C. in early 2016. However, by early 2017, he was playing for Santos Laguna affiliate Santos Laguna Premier in the Segunda División de México. On 10 May 2018 Cetré made his play off debut with Santos Laguna and quickly scored his first goal during the second half of the first leg semifinal against Club America.

After the Clausura 2018 championship, Cetré was warned by Santos Laguna, on numerous occasions, about his indiscipline and nightlife; however, the midfielder ignored it. After his 21st birthday, on 1 January, the player and his agent requested a contract extension. Due to his indiscipline, the club refused to offer him a new contract. The club then offered Cetré to go on loan at Tampico Madero, but he rejected the offer. Cetré started the preseason for the Clausura 2019 with the club, but was not registered to the squad. The player then left the club on 28 January 2019 and it was rumored, that he was looking for an Argentine club to play for. However, he ended up joining Atlético Junior.

In September 2020, Cetré was part of the Junior squad that won the Superliga Colombiana, entering as a substitute in both matches.

In January 2023, Cetré joined Independiente Medellín. On 30 November 2023, Cetré scored twice in a 2–1 victory against Millonarios. His goals helped his club make the finals against his former club Junior, and Cetré scored in the second leg; although Medellin won the match, Junior had won the first leg and then won on penalties to win the title.

In January 2026, Cetré almost joined Campeonato Brasileiro Série A side Athletico PR.The 28-year-old player almost signed with Athletico Paranaense for three seasons and he would be the most expensive signing in the club's history: 6 million dollars (R$ 31 million). However, Estudiantes de La Plata, from Argentina, announced late Sunday afternoon (1), the cancellation of the transfer of Colombian striker, Edwuin Cetré, to Athletico. According to the Argentinian club, the deal fell through after "last-minute disagreements between the two clubs."

== International career ==
Cetré was first called up for the Colombian under-17 side for the Copa México de Naciones in 2014. He also played at the 2015 South American Under-17 Football Championship, scoring the only goal in the final against Brazil.

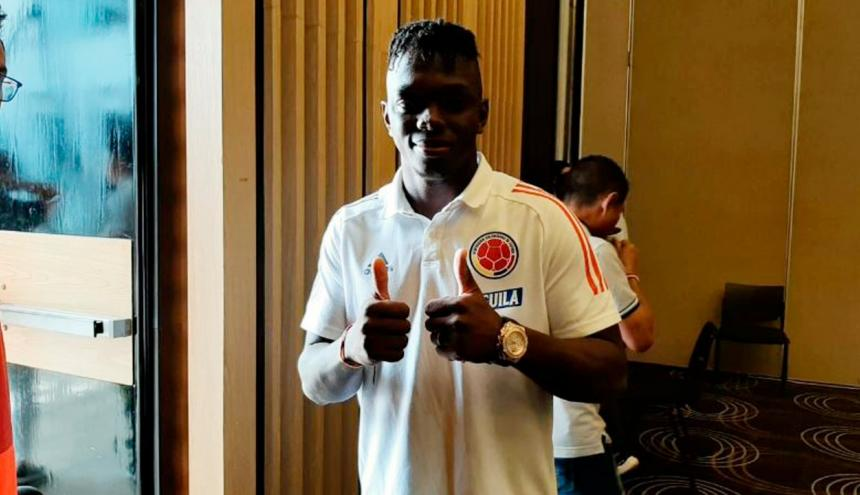
Cetré with Colombia under-23 in 2020

== Career statistics ==
=== Club ===
As of 22 December 2018.

Club	Season	League			Cup		Continental		Other		Total	
Club	Season	Division	Apps	Goals	Apps	Goals	Apps	Goals	Apps	Goals	Apps	Goals
Rocha	2016	Uruguayan Segunda División	9	1	0	0	–		0	0	9	1
Santos Laguna Premier	2017	Liga Premier de México	27	6	0	0	–		0	0	27	6
Santos Laguna	2017–18	Liga MX	11	1	4 (Note: Appearances in the Copa MX)	0	–		0	0	15	1
Santos Laguna	2018–19	Liga MX	4	0	0	0	0	0	0	0	4	0
Career total			51	8	4	0	0	0	0	0	55	8

== Honours ==
Santos Laguna

- Liga MX: Clausura 2018

Junior de Barranquilla

- Superliga Colombiana: 2020

Estudiantes

- Copa de la Liga Profesional: 2024
- Trofeo de Campeones de la Liga Profesional: 2024, 2025
- Primera División: 2025 Clausura
