= Tiago Palacios =

Uruguayan footballer (born 2001)

Personal information
- Full name: Tiago Asahel Palacios
- Date of birth: 28 March 2001 (age 25)
- Place of birth: Buenos Aires, Argentina
- Height: 1.65 m (5 ft 5 in)
- Positions: Winger; attacking midfielder

Team information
- Current team: Estudiantes
- Number: 10

Youth career
- 2011–2017: River Plate
- 2018–2020: Platense

Senior career*
Years	Team	Apps	(Gls)
2020–2021	Platense	13	(0)
2021–2024	Montevideo City Torque	68	(15)
2021	→ Platense (loan)	13	(1)
2024–	Estudiantes	94	(16)

International career^{‡}
2024	Uruguay U23	6	(0)
- * Club domestic league appearances and goals as of 17:23, 21 November 2026 (UTC) ‡ National team caps and goals as of 2 February 2024

Tiago Asahel Palacios (born 28 March 2001) is a professional footballer who plays as a winger for Estudiantes. Born in Argentina, he represents Uruguay at international level.

== Club career ==
Palacios joined the youth system of River Plate in 2011, he remained there for six years before being released in December 2017. In February 2018, he moved to Platense.

Palacios signed his first professional contract with Platense on 3 January 2020. He was soon promoted into Juan Pablo Pumpido's first-team squad, with his senior debut arriving on 6 March during a home Primera Nacional defeat to Alvarado; he replaced Gonzalo Bazán with twenty-six minutes remaining. His first start came four days later in a Copa Argentina round of sixty-four loss to Deportivo Madryn of Torneo Federal A at the Estadio Ciudad de Caseros.

Palacios made ten appearances in the club's promotion-winning campaign of 2020. On 6 February 2021, Platense revealed that they had reached an agreement with Uruguayan Primera División side Montevideo City Torque for the $380,000 transfer of Palacios. Torque didn't officially announce the acquisition until 22 February, a day after the midfielder had made his Argentine Primera División debut in a victory on the road against Argentinos Juniors. He scored his first senior goal in his third top-flight appearance on 6 March versus Godoy Cruz.

== International career ==
Born in Argentina, Palacios is of Uruguayan descent through his mother. In January 2024, he was named in Uruguay's squad for the 2024 CONMEBOL Pre-Olympic Tournament.

In September 2024, Palacios received his first call-up to the Uruguay national team for FIFA World Cup qualification matches against Paraguay and Venezuela.

== Career statistics ==
As of 2 January 2026.

Club	Division	Season	League		Cup		Continental		Total	
Club	Division	Season	Apps	Goals	Apps	Goals	Apps	Goals	Apps	Goals
Platense	Primera Nacional	2019-20	2	0	1	0	—		3	0
Platense	Primera Nacional	2020	10	0	—		—		10	0
Platense	Argentine Primera División	2021 (Note: Soccerway counts Copa de la Liga Profesional appearances as league appearances.)	3	0	11	1	—		14	1
Platense	Total		15	0	12	1	0	0	27	1
Montevideo City Torque	Uruguayan Primera División	2022	33	6	1	1	1 (Note: Appearance(s) in Copa Libertadores)	0	35	7
Montevideo City Torque	Uruguayan Primera División	2023	35	9	—		—		35	9
Montevideo City Torque	Total		68	15	1	1	1	0	70	16
Estudiantes	Argentine Primera División	2024	24	3	15	4	4	0	43	7
Estudiantes	Argentine Primera División	2025	35	5	1	0	10	3	46	8
Estudiantes	Total		59	8	16	4	14	3	89	15
Career total			142	23	29	6	15	3	186	32

== Honours ==
Estudiantes

- Copa de la Liga Profesional: 2024
- Trofeo de Campeones de la Liga Profesional: 2024
- Primera División: 2025 Clausura
