= Joaquín García (footballer, born 2001) =

Argentine footballer (born 2001)

Joaquin García
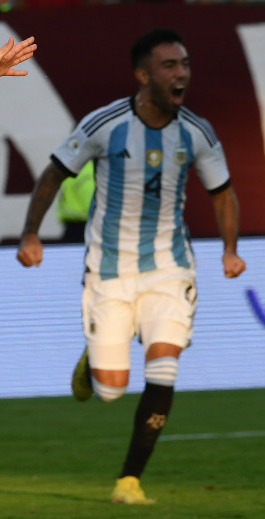
- García in 2024

Personal information
- Full name: Roberto Joaquin Garcia
- Date of birth: 21 August 2001 (age 25)
- Height: 1.81 m (5 ft 11 in)
- Position: Defender

Team information
- Current team: Velez Sarsfield
- Number: 4

Senior career*
| Years | Team | Apps | (Gls) |
| 2021– | Velez Sarsfield | 70 | (3) |

International career
| 2024– | Argentina U23 | 5 | (0) |
- * Club domestic league appearances and goals as of 16:49, 16 June 2026 (UTC)

Roberto Joaquín García (born 20 August 2001) is an Argentine footballer who plays for Velez Sarsfield.

== Club career ==
A youth product of Velez Sarsfield, he joined the club at eight years-old. He made his first team debut in March 2021 against Defensa y Justicia. In January 2023 he signed a new two-year contract with the club. He scored his first league goal on 10 October 2023 against Atlético Tucumán. In April 2024, he reached the final of the 2024 Copa de la Liga Profesional with Velez.

== International career ==
He was called up by Javier Mascherano to the Argentina U23 team for the 2024 Olympic Qualifiers in January 2024, and the side went on to secure qualification for the 2024 Olympic Games. In June 2024, he was named in the provisional squad for the 2024 Paris Olympics.

== Style of play ==
He plays as a full back on the right side of defence.

== Honours ==
Vélez Sarsfield

- Argentine Primera División: 2024
