= Santiago Núñez =

Argentine footballer

Personal information
- Full name: Santiago Misael Núñez
- Date of birth: 29 April 2000 (age 26)
- Place of birth: Roque Pérez, Buenos Aires, Argentina
- Height: 1.86 m (6 ft 1 in)
- Position: Centre-back

Team information
- Current team: Estudiantes
- Number: 6

Youth career
- Club Atlético Roque Pérez
- Estudiantes

Senior career*
Years	Team	Apps	(Gls)
2022–2024	Estudiantes	32	(0)
2024–2025	Santos Laguna	24	(0)
2025–	Estudiantes	51	(2)
- * Club domestic league appearances and goals as of 17:17, 21 November 2026 (UTC)

Santiago Misael Núñez is an Argentine professional footballer who plays as a centre-back for Estudiantes.

== Career ==
Núñez started his youth career with Club Atlético Roque Pérez, prior to moving to the academy of Estudiantes.

He made his senior debut for Estudiantes on 23 April 2022 in a 2–2 draw against Colón. He scored his first goal the following year, on 19 April against Tacuary in the Copa Sudamericana.

On 13 December 2023, he was part of the starting team as Estudiantes won the 2023 Copa Argentina.

In December 2023, he signed for Santos Laguna in Liga MX for approximately $2.5 million.

In January 2025, he returned to Estudiantes, signing a five-year contract.

== Career statistics ==
As of 10 April 2024.

Appearances and goals by club, season and competition
Club	Season	League			Cup		League Cup		Continental		Other		Total	
Club	Season	Division	Apps	Goals	Apps	Goals	Apps	Goals	Apps	Goals	Apps	Goals	Apps	Goals
Estudiantes	2022	Primera División	2	0	0	0	2	0	1	0	—		5	0
Estudiantes	2023	Primera División	16	0	4	0	12	0	12	1	—		44	1
Estudiantes	Total		18	0	4	0	14	0	13	1	0	0	49	1
Santos Laguna	2023–24	Liga MX	12	0	—		—		—		—		12	0
Career total			40	0	4	0	14	0	13	1	0	0	61	1

== Honours ==
Estudiantes

- Copa Argentina: 2023
- Primera División: 2025 Clausura
- Trofeo de Campeones de la Liga Profesional: 2025
