= Franco Pardo =

Argentine footballer (born 1997)

Personal information
- Date of birth: 5 April 1997 (age 29)
- Place of birth: Córdoba, Argentina
- Height: 1.83 m (6 ft 0 in)
- Position: Centre-back

Team information
- Current team: Santos Laguna
- Number: 18

Youth career
- Belgrano

Senior career*
Years	Team	Apps	(Gls)
2017–2021	Belgrano	8	(0)
2021–2022	Estudiantes RC	32	(2)
2022–2023	Palestino	27	(0)
2023	All Boys	26	(1)
2023–2025	Unión Santa Fe	61	(5)
2025–2026	Racing Club	10	(0)
2026–	Santos Laguna	0	(0)
- * Club domestic league appearances and goals as of 18:05, 1 January 2026 (UTC)

Franco Pardo (born 5 April 1997) is an Argentine footballer who plays as a centre-back for Liga MX club Santos Laguna.

== Career ==
Pardo started his Belgrano career in May 2017, making his professional debut on 8 May in an away win versus Vélez Sarsfield as a second-half substitute for Matías Suárez. Having suffered a serious knee injury soon after, Pardo returned to the first-team set-up in May 2019 for a Copa Argentina encounter with Deportivo Riestra.

In February 2021, Pardo joined Estudiantes de Río Cuarto. A year later, in February 2022, Pardo moved to Chilean Primera División club Palestino.

On 12 June 2026, Pardo joined Santos Laguna.

== Career statistics ==
As of 8 May 2019.

Club statistics
Club	Season	League			Cup		League Cup		Continental		Other		Total	
Club	Season	Division	Apps	Goals	Apps	Goals	Apps	Goals	Apps	Goals	Apps	Goals	Apps	Goals
Belgrano	2016–17	Primera División	1	0	0	0	—		0	0	0	0	1	0
Belgrano	2017–18	Primera División	0	0	0	0	—		—		0	0	0	0
Belgrano	2018–19	Primera División	0	0	1	0	0	0	—		0	0	1	0
Career total			1	0	1	0	0	0	0	0	0	0	2	0
