= Estadio Único Madre de Ciudades =

Football stadium in Santiago del Estero, Argentina

Coordinates: 27°45′58″S 64°16′12″W

Unique Madre de Ciudades Stadium
- Estadio Único Madre de Ciudades
- Estadio Único de Santiago del Estero

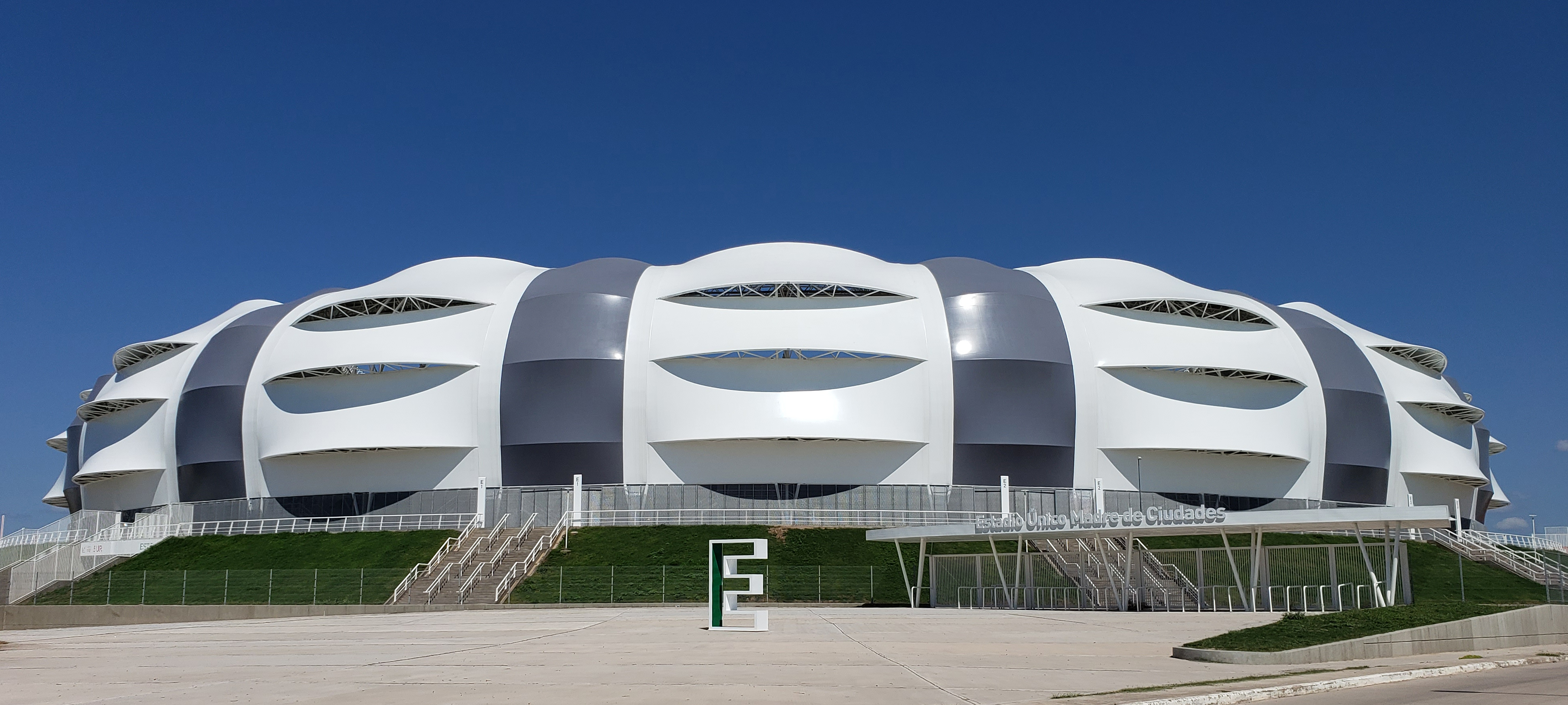
- East entrance of the stadium
- Interactive map of Unique Madre de Ciudades Stadium
- Full name: Estadio Único Madre de Ciudades
- Location: Belgrano Avenue, Santiago del Estero, Argentina
- Owner: Government of Santiago del Estero
- Capacity: 30,000 (expandable to 42,000)
- Surface: Grass
- Field size: 105 x 70 m

Construction
- Built: June 2018 – May 2020
- Opened: 4 March 2021; 5 years ago
- Cost: AR$ 1,500 million
- Architect: Luciani Asociados Arquitectos – Enrique Lombardi
- Builders: MIJOVI; Astori

Tenants
- Teams: Central Córdoba; C.A. Mitre; Argentina national football team (2021–); Argentina national rugby team (2022–); Competitions: Copa Argentina final (2020); Supercopa Argentina (2022–); Trofeo de Campeones LPF (2021–); Supercopa Argentina (2022–); Liga Profesional finals (2025–)

The Estadio Único Madre de Ciudades is a football stadium located in the city of Santiago del Estero in the homonymous province of Argentina. The stadium was inaugurated on 4 March 2021, before the 2019 Supercopa Argentina match contested by River Plate and Racing Club. The President of Argentina Alberto Fernández attended the ceremony.

The Estadio Único was expected to host some matches during the binational 2020 Copa América to be held in Argentina and Colombia. However, due to the COVID-19 pandemic, the tournament was rescheduled to 2021 and eventually moved to Brazil. The stadium held its first international match on 3 June 2021, hosting the 2022 FIFA World Cup qualification match between Chile and Argentina. Since then, the stadium has hosted several domestic cup competitions finals such as Copa Argentina, Supercopa Argentina, Trofeo de Campeones, and top division league Liga Profesional finals.

The stadium, the largest venue in the province, is owned and administered by the provincial government and has a seating capacity of over 30,000 spectators. The stadium facilities include a restaurant, a museum, a game room, and parking lots.

== History ==
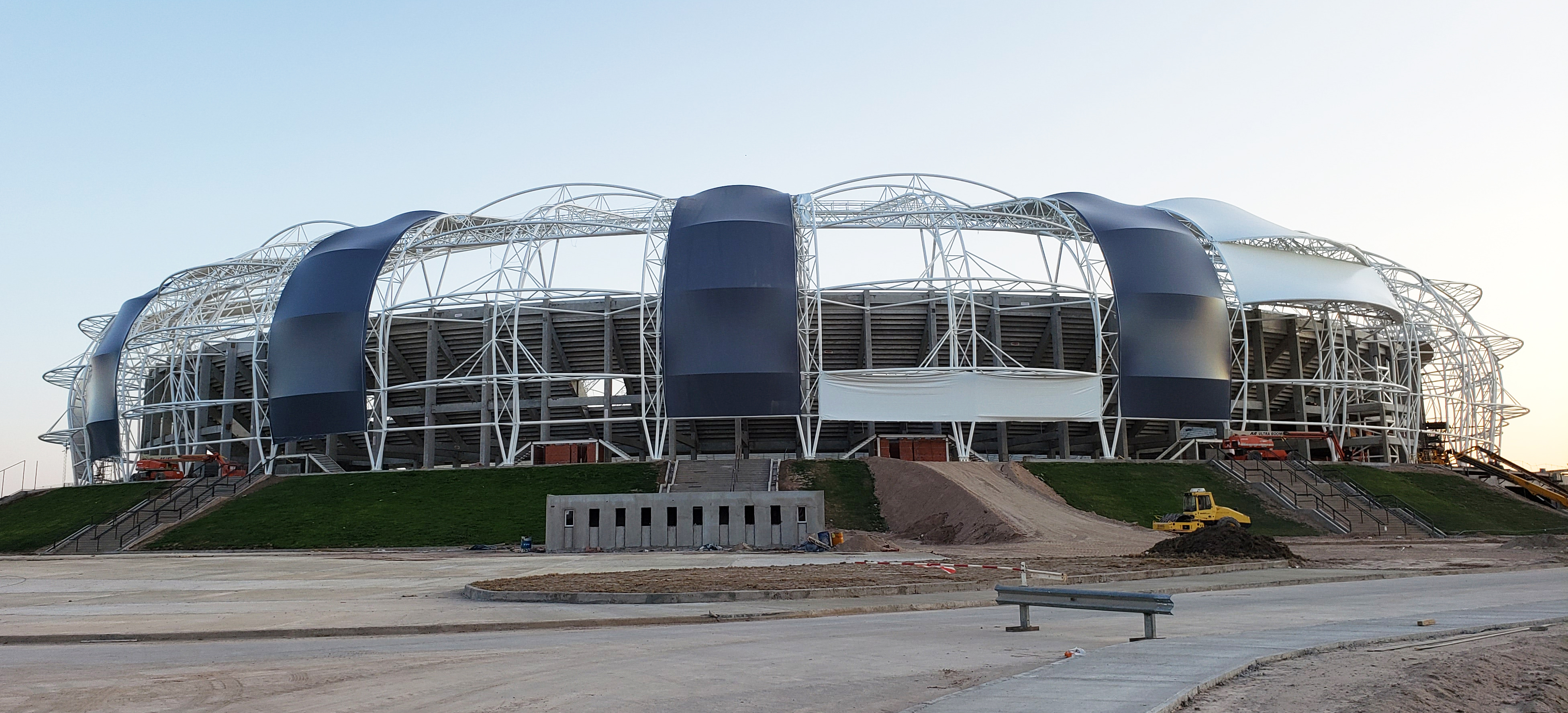
The stadium being built during January 2020

On 13 April 2018, Santiago del Estero's governor Gerardo Zamora, along with the Argentine Football Association (AFA)'s president Claudio Tapia, presented a new stadium project in the province, which was accepted. Both authorities signed an agreement for the stadium to host qualification matches for the Argentina national football team and to be nominated as one of the host stadiums during the 2021 Copa América, since Argentina and Colombia were organizing the event.

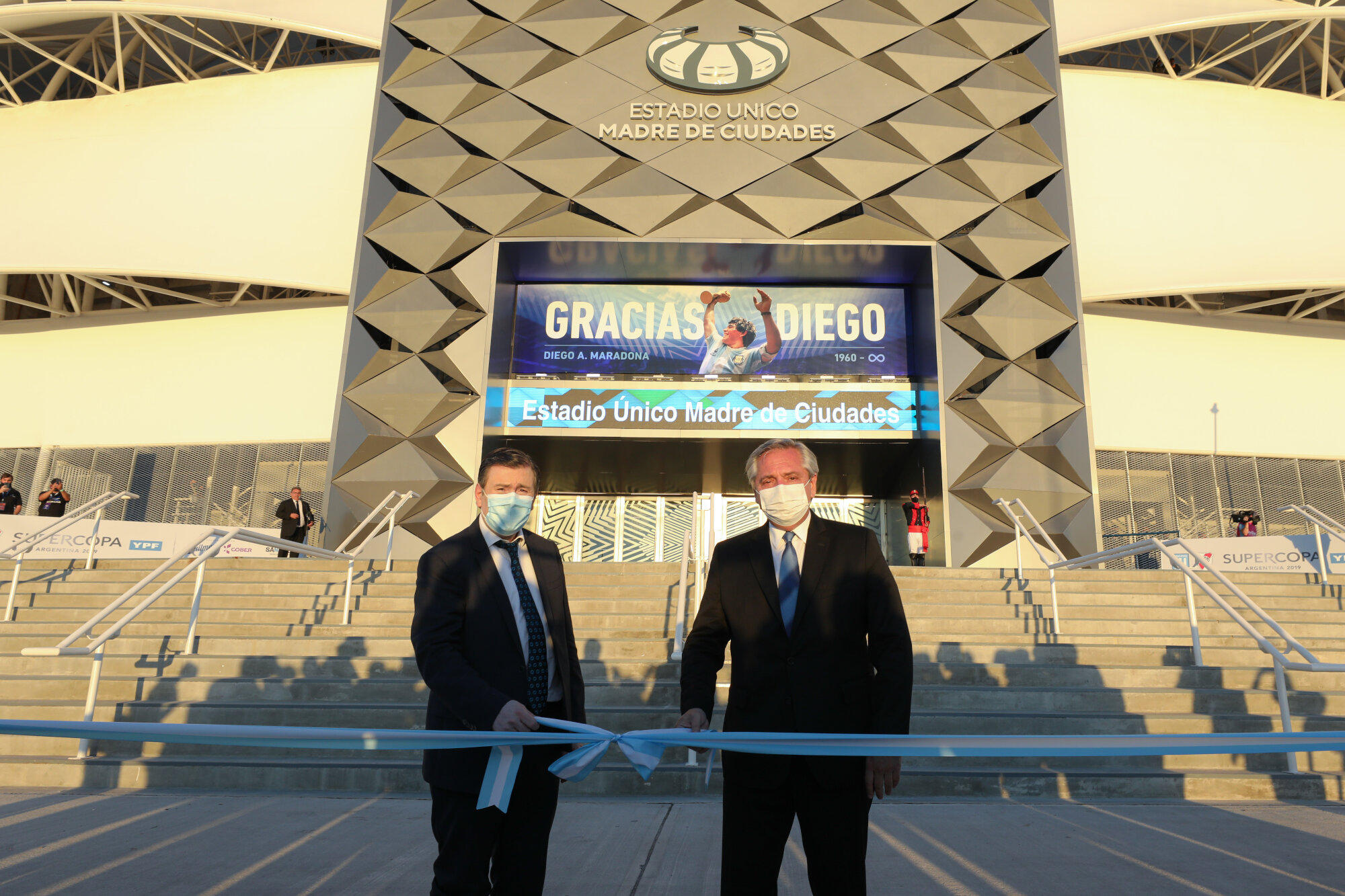
Santiago del Estero governor Gerardo Zamora and Argentine president Alberto Fernández at the inauguration of the Estadio Único on 4 March 2021

Another objective for the stadium was to be one of the potential hosts of the 2030 FIFA World Cup if the Southern Cone's bid was chosen as the winning venue to host it by FIFA.

Construction started in June 2018, and in July 2019, the Estadio Único was confirmed as one of the hosts of the 2021 Copa América. However, in November of that year, CONMEBOL questioned that nomination after seeing the low progresson construction. Finally, on 3 December 2019, the stadium was again confirmed to be one of the hosts of the final tournament.

After the draw, the stadium was scheduled to host two matches, between Uruguay and Paraguay and Chile against Paraguay, on 27 June. However, the immediate emergence of the COVID-19 pandemic worldwide disrupted the tournament's organization, so the cup was postponed to the next year. In May 2020, the stadium was chosen to host the Copa Sudamericana finals for three years, and in August, CONMEBOL gave the stadium a match between Chile and Paraguay on 23 June 2021.

== Name ==
The stadium was named "Estadio Único Madre de Ciudades" (in English, Mother of Cities Stadium). This name was chosen as a tribute to Santiago del Estero, founded on 25 July 1553. As the oldest city of Argentina, it gained the nickname "Madre de Ciudades", which was used by the Spanish Empire before founding more cities across northern Argentina.

== Features ==
In 2010, the architect and former president of Estudiantes de La Plata, Enrique Lombardi, named the project as the winner of a local competition. The stadium was built on a site located to the north of the city of Santiago del Estero on the banks of the Dulce River. The land is surrounded by Carretero Bridge and the city's botanical garden, and is connected to the Tren al Desarrollo by a station.

The project itself consists of a cylindrical stadium with fully covered grandstands, with a capacity of 29,000 seated spectators. It includes VIP sectors, restaurant spaces and a covered parking lot with a capacity for 400 cars. In addition, the stadium was designed with a main access plaza, a sports museum and a press area. The design complies with FIFA, CONMEBOL and AFA standards. The plaza includes a bronze statue of Diego Maradona measuring 5 metres (16 ft).

== Sporting events ==
=== Football ===
The first notable event held in the stadium was the 2019 Supercopa Argentina played by River Plate against Racing Club on 4 March 2021. The stadium was expected to host some matches of the 2021 Copa América, but the tournament was eventually moved to Brazil. The stadium is expected to host some matches of the 2023 FIFA U-20 World Cup.

=== 2023 FIFA U-20 World Cup ===
Date	Time (UTC−03)	Team 1	Result	Team 2	Round	Attendance
20 May 2023	15:00	Guatemala	0–1	New Zealand	Group A	15,100
20 May 2023	18:00	Argentina	2–1	Uzbekistan	Group A	37,233
23 May 2023	15:00	Uzbekistan	2–2	New Zealand	Group A	12,243
23 May 2023	18:00	Argentina	3–0	Guatemala	Group A	37,033
26 May 2023	15:00	Ecuador	9–0	Fiji	Group B	9,958
26 May 2023	18:00	Uzbekistan	2–0	Guatemala	Group A	15,357
1 Jun 2023	14:30	Gambia	0–1	Uruguay	Round of 16	7,644
1 Jun 2023	18:00	Ecuador	2–3	South Korea	Round of 16	12,492
4 Jun 2023	14:30	South Korea	1–0 (a.e.t.)	Nigeria	Quarter-finals	10,298
4 Jun 2023	18:00	United States	0–2	Uruguay	Quarter-finals	18,474

=== Argentina matches and domestic cups finals ===
Date	Event	Team #1	Score	Team #2	Attend.
5 Mar 2021	2019 Supercopa Argentina	Racing	0–5	River Plate	0 (Note: No spectators allowed because of the COVID-19 pandemic.)
3 Jun 2021	2022 World Cup Qualification	Argentina	1–1	Chile	0
8 Dec 2021	2020 Copa Argentina Final	Talleres (C)	0–0 (4–5 p)	Boca Juniors	30,000
18 Dec 2021	2021 Trofeo de Campeones	River Plate	4–0	Colón	
1 Mar 2023	2022 Supercopa Argentina	Boca Juniors	3–0	Patronato	
28 Mar 2023	Friendly	Argentina	7–0	Curaçao	42,000
22 Dec 2023	2023 Trofeo de Campeones	Rosario Central	0–2	River Plate	n/a
21 Dec 2024	2024 Trofeo de Campeones	Vélez Sarsfield	0–3	Estudiantes (LP)	n/a
1 Jun 2025	2025 Torneo Apertura final	Huracán	0–1	Platense	n/a
13 Dec 2025	2025 Torneo Clausura final	Racing	1–1 (4–5 p)	Estudiantes (LP)	

=== Rugby ===
The stadium hosted its first ever international rugby union match as Argentina hosted Scotland on Saturday 16 July in the third test match of a three test series between the two sides during the 2022 July rugby union tests.

Date	Event	Home team	Score	Away team	Att.	Ref.
16 Jul 2022	2022 mid-year test	Argentina	34–31	Scotland	30,000	
21 Sep 2024	Rugby Championship	Argentina	29–28	South Africa	25,000	
18 Jul 2026	Nations Championship	Argentina	24–31	England	22,225	

== Controversy ==
The construction of the stadium received criticism by some parts of the press for being carried out in the midst of the economic crisis that plagued the country, the government's struggle to restructure Argentina's debt. The stadium was also criticized for being considered a priority of the provincial government, ahead of the existing poverty situation in the province of Santiago del Estero (about 70%). According to the INDEC, Santiago del Estero ranks first in the provinces in a critical state of unemployment throughout Argentina and ranks relatively low compared to other provinces on the Human Development Index.

The provincial governor, Gerardo Zamora, defended the construction of the stadium by arguing it helped promote Santiago del Estero as a "headquarters for international football" and a "tourism hotspot", as well as by citing the direct and indirect creation of jobs in its construction process.

== See also ==
- List of football stadiums in Argentina

Preceded by (various venues in Poland)	FIFA U-20 World Cup; 2023	Succeeded by TBD
