= 2024 Copa de la Liga Profesional =

Tournament details
- Country: Argentina
- Dates: 25 January – 5 May 2024
- Teams: 28

Final positions
- Champions: Estudiantes (LP) (1st title)
- 2025 Copa Libertadores: Estudiantes (LP)

Tournament statistics
- Matches played: 203
- Goals scored: 451 (2.22 per match)
- Top goal scorer: Miguel Borja (13 goals)

The 2024 Copa de la Liga Profesional (officially the Copa Sur Finanzas 2024 for sponsorship reasons) was the fifth and final edition of the Copa de la Liga Profesional, an Argentine domestic cup. It began on 25 January and ended on 5 May 2024.

The competition was contested by 28 teams, 26 returning from the 2023 season as well as 2 promoted teams from the 2023 Primera Nacional (Independiente Rivadavia and Deportivo Riestra). Rosario Central were the defending champions but they were eliminated in the Group stage.

After a 1–1 draw in the final, Estudiantes (LP) won 4–3 on penalties against Vélez Sarsfield to claim their first title in the tournament. As champions, Estudiantes (LP) qualified for the 2025 Copa Libertadores and the 2024 Trofeo de Campeones.

== Format ==
For the group stage, the 28 teams were drawn into two groups of fourteen teams each, playing on a single round-robin basis. Additionally, each team played one interzonal match against its rival team in the other zone. In each group, the top four teams advanced to the quarter-finals. The final stages (quarter-finals, semi-finals and final) were played on a single-legged basis.

== Draw ==
The 28 teams were drawn into two groups of fourteen containing one team from each of the interzonal matches. The groups were the same as the 2023 Copa de la Liga Profesional, except that the 2023 relegated teams, Colón and Arsenal, were replaced by the 2023 promoted teams, Independiente Rivadavia and Deportivo Riestra, respectively.

== Group stage ==
In the group stage, each group was played on a single round-robin basis. Additionally, in the seventh round, each team played one interzonal match against its rival team in the other zone. Teams were ranked according to the following criteria: 1. Points (3 points for a win, 1 point for a draw, and 0 points for a loss); 2. Goal difference; 3. Goals scored; 4. Head-to-head results; 5. Fair play ranking; 6. Draw.

The top four teams of each group advanced to the quarter-finals.

=== Zone A ===
Pos	Team	Pld	W	D	L	GF	GA	GD	Pts	Qualification
1	River Plate	14	7	6	1	26	10	+16	27	Advance to quarter-finals
2	Argentinos Juniors	14	7	5	2	25	14	+11	26	Advance to quarter-finals
3	Barracas Central	14	7	5	2	20	15	+5	26	Advance to quarter-finals
4	Vélez Sarsfield	14	7	4	3	14	13	+1	25	Advance to quarter-finals
5	Talleres (C)	14	6	6	2	24	16	+8	24	
6	Independiente	14	6	5	3	14	10	+4	23	
7	Instituto	14	5	2	7	18	17	+1	17	
8	Banfield	14	4	5	5	14	15	−1	17	
9	Huracán	14	4	4	6	12	12	0	16	
10	Gimnasia y Esgrima (LP)	14	5	1	8	18	23	−5	16	
11	Rosario Central	14	4	3	7	10	18	−8	15	
12	Deportivo Riestra	14	3	4	7	8	16	−8	13	
13	Atlético Tucumán	14	1	7	6	8	23	−15	10	
14	Independiente Rivadavia	14	2	2	10	13	25	−12	8	

Source: AFA

=== Zone B ===
Pos	Team	Pld	W	D	L	GF	GA	GD	Pts	Qualification
1	Godoy Cruz	14	9	2	3	16	6	+10	29	Advance to quarter-finals
2	Estudiantes (LP)	14	8	3	3	19	9	+10	27	Advance to quarter-finals
3	Defensa y Justicia	14	7	5	2	17	13	+4	26	Advance to quarter-finals
4	Boca Juniors	14	7	4	3	20	12	+8	25	Advance to quarter-finals
5	Racing	14	7	3	4	24	11	+13	24	
6	Lanús	14	7	2	5	20	14	+6	23	
7	Newell's Old Boys	14	6	3	5	13	15	−2	21	
8	Unión	14	5	5	4	16	14	+2	20	
9	Platense	14	4	6	4	10	14	−4	18	
10	San Lorenzo	14	3	7	4	10	14	−4	16	
11	Belgrano	14	3	5	6	19	21	−2	14	
12	Central Córdoba (SdE)	14	2	5	7	10	20	−10	11	
13	Sarmiento (J)	14	2	3	9	9	19	−10	9	
14	Tigre	14	1	2	11	7	25	−18	5	

Source: AFA

=== Results ===
==== Zone A ====
Home \ Away	ARG	ATU	BAN	BAR	DRI	GLP	HUR	IND	IRI	INS	RIV	ROS	TAL	VEL
Argentinos Juniors			4–2	3–3	2–0	2–0			2–1			3–0		
Atlético Tucumán	0–0		0–3			3–2			2–2		0–0	1–1		0–0
Banfield				0–0	2–0		0–2	0–1		0–2			0–0	1–2
Barracas Central		2–0					1–0	2–2		3–2	0–2		2–1	1–1
Deportivo Riestra		1–0		0–1			0–0	1–0			0–3		0–1	1–2
Gimnasia y Esgrima (LP)			1–2	2–0	2–1		3–1		2–3	1–3				
Huracán	1–1	4–0						0–0			1–0	2–0	1–2	
Independiente	2–1	1–1				0–1					1–1	1–0	2–2	
Independiente Rivadavia			1–2	1–3	1–2		2–0	0–1		0–2				0–1
Instituto	1–2	3–0			0–0		2–0	0–2			1–3		2–2	
River Plate	1–1		1–1			3–1			2–0			2–1		5–0
Rosario Central			0–0	1–2	1–1	2–1			1–0	1–0				
Talleres (C)	2–1	4–1				0–1			1–1		2–2	4–1		1–0
Vélez Sarsfield	0–0					3–1	1–0	0–1		1–0		1–0		

Source: AFA
Legend: Blue = home team win; Yellow = draw; Red = away team win.

==== Zone B ====
Home \ Away	BEL	BOC	CCO	DYJ	EST	GOD	LAN	NOB	PLA	RAC	SLO	SAR	TIG	UNI
Belgrano				1–1		0–1	0–1			0–4	1–1	4–1		
Boca Juniors	3–2		2–0	0–0		1–0				4–2	2–1	1–1		
Central Córdoba (SdE)	2–2					0–2		0–1		1–3	0–0	3–0		
Defensa y Justicia			1–1		1–0		0–4	1–0	3–0					2–1
Estudiantes (LP)	1–0	1–0	5–0					2–0	1–2	0–0			2–0	
Godoy Cruz				2–0	1–2		1–0	1–1				1–0	1–0	0–0
Lanús		2–1	0–1		1–2			0–2	3–0					2–2
Newell's Old Boys	1–0	1–3							0–0	0–4	2–2		1–0	
Platense	1–1	0–0	1–0			1–2				0–0	0–0		3–1	
Racing				1–1		0–2	2–0				4–1	0–1	3–0	0–1
San Lorenzo				0–2	1–1	1–0	0–2					1–0	2–0	0–0
Sarmiento (J)				2–3	3–1		0–1	0–1	0–1					1–2
Tigre	1–4	0–2	1–0	0–1			2–3					0–0		0–1
Unión	1–2	1–0	2–2		0–1			1–3	0–0					

Source: AFA
Legend: Blue = home team win; Yellow = draw; Red = away team win.

==== Interzonal matches ====
Home	Score	Away
Sarmiento (J)	0–0	Barracas Central
Unión	4–1	Independiente Rivadavia
Huracán	0–0	San Lorenzo
Gimnasia y Esgrima (LP)	0–0	Estudiantes (LP)
Newell's Old Boys	0–1	Rosario Central
Independiente	0–1	Racing
River Plate	1–1	Boca Juniors
Belgrano	2–2	Talleres (C)
Argentinos Juniors	3–1	Platense
Vélez Sarsfield	2–2	Tigre
Defensa y Justicia	1–1	Deportivo Riestra
Lanús	1–1	Banfield
Central Córdoba (SdE)	0–0	Atlético Tucumán
Instituto	0–2	Godoy Cruz

Source:AFA
Legend: Blue = home team win; Yellow = draw; Red = away team win.

== Final stages ==
Starting from the quarter-finals, the teams played a single-elimination tournament on a single-leg basis with the following rules:

- The quarter-finals and the semi-finals were played at a neutral venue, with the higher-seeded serving as the home team.
  - If tied, a penalty shoot-out would be used to determine the winners.
- The Final was played at a neutral venue.
  - If tied, extra time would be played. If the score is still tied after extra time, a penalty shoot-out would be used to determine the champions.

=== Bracket ===
Quarter-finals
Estudiantes (LP)	3
Barracas Central	0
River Plate	2
Boca Juniors	3
Argentinos Juniors (p)	1 (3)
Defensa y Justicia	1 (2)
Godoy Cruz	1
Vélez Sarsfield	2

Semi-finals
Estudiantes (LP) (p)	1 (3)
Boca Juniors	1 (1)
Argentinos Juniors	0 (2)
Vélez Sarsfield (p)	0 (4)

Final
Estudiantes (LP) (p)	1 (4)
Vélez Sarsfield	1 (3)

=== Quarter-finals ===
Team 1	Score	Team 2
River Plate	2–3	Boca Juniors
Godoy Cruz	1–2	Vélez Sarsfield
Argentinos Juniors	1–1 (3–2 p)	Defensa y Justicia
Estudiantes (LP)	3–0	Barracas Central

==== Matches ====
20 April 2024
15:30

Argentinos Juniors	1–1	Defensa y Justicia
A. Rodríguez 85'	Report	Bogarín 10'
Penalties
Oroz (penalty scored); Moyano (penalty missed); Gondou (penalty missed); Verón (penalty scored); Montiel (penalty missed); D. Rodríguez (penalty scored)	3–2	(penalty scored) Aguilera; (penalty missed) Burgos; (penalty missed) Godoy; (penalty missed) Soto; (penalty scored) López; (penalty missed) Molinas

Estadio Florencio Sola, Banfield
Referee: Andrés Merlos

20 April 2024
18:30

Estudiantes (LP)	3–0	Barracas Central
Carrillo 1', 61'; Correa 85'	Report

Estadio Ciudad de Vicente López, Florida
Referee: Darío Herrera

20 April 2024
21:30

Godoy Cruz	1–2	Vélez Sarsfield
Altamira 17'	Report	Romero 23', 67'

Estadio Único, Villa Mercedes
Referee: Sebastián Zunino

21 April 2024
15:30

River Plate	2–3	Boca Juniors
Borja 9'; P. Díaz 90+6'	Report	Merentiel 45', 66'; Cavani 61'

Estadio Mario Alberto Kempes, Córdoba
Attendance: 55,000
Referee: Yael Falcón Pérez

=== Semi-finals ===
Team 1	Score	Team 2
Estudiantes (LP)	1–1 (3–1 p)	Boca Juniors
Argentinos Juniors	0–0 (2–4 p)	Vélez Sarsfield

==== Matches ====
28 April 2024
15:30

Argentinos Juniors	0–0	Vélez Sarsfield
	Report
Penalties
Verón (penalty scored); Heredia (penalty missed); Moyano (penalty scored); Gondou (penalty missed)	2–4	(penalty missed) Méndez; (penalty scored) Vecino; (penalty scored) García; (penalty scored) Cáseres; (penalty scored) Lobato

Estadio Único de San Nicolás, San Nicolás de los Arroyos
Referee: Facundo Tello

30 April 2024
20:00

Estudiantes (LP)	1–1	Boca Juniors
Cetré 75' (pen.)	Report	Merentiel 40'
Penalties
Cetré (penalty missed); Mancuso (penalty scored); Carrillo (penalty scored); Méndez (penalty scored)	3–1	(penalty missed) Cavani; (penalty missed) Merentiel; (penalty scored) Zenón; (penalty missed) Figal

Estadio Mario Alberto Kempes, Córdoba
Referee: Nazareno Arasa

=== Final ===
5 May 2024
15:30

Estudiantes (LP)	1–1 (a.e.t.)	Vélez Sarsfield
Mancuso 13'	Report	Sarco 62'
Penalties
Piatti (penalty scored); Mancuso (penalty missed); Correa (penalty scored); Cetré (penalty scored); Ascacíbar (penalty missed); Zuqui (penalty scored)	4–3	(penalty scored) Mammana; (penalty scored) Sarco; (penalty missed) García; (penalty missed) Cáseres; (penalty scored) Lobato; (penalty missed) Montoro

Estadio Único Madre de Ciudades, Santiago del Estero
Referee: Nicolás Ramírez

== Season statistics ==
=== Top goalscorers ===
Rank	Player	Club	Goals
1	(Colombia) Miguel Borja	River Plate	13
2	(Argentina) Adrián Martínez	Racing	12
3	(Uruguay) Ignacio Ramírez	Newell's Old Boys	8
4	(Uruguay) Edinson Cavani	Boca Juniors	7
4	(Uruguay) Miguel Merentiel	Boca Juniors	7
6	(Argentina) Alan Lescano	Argentinos Juniors	6
6	(Argentina) Maximiliano Romero	Argentinos Juniors	6
6	(Argentina) Lucas Passerini	Belgrano	6
6	(Argentina) Damián Puebla	Instituto	6
6	(Argentina) Walter Bou	Lanús	6
6	(Argentina) Facundo Colidio	River Plate	6
6	(Paraguay) Adam Bareiro	San Lorenzo	6
6	(Argentina) Federico Girotti	Talleres (C)	6
6	(Argentina) Braian Romero	Vélez Sarsfield	6

Source: AFA

=== Top assists ===
Rank	Player	Club	Goals
1	(Argentina) Esequiel Barco	River Plate	6
2	(Argentina) Gastón Lodico	Instituto	5
2	(Argentina) Claudio Aquino	Vélez Sarsfield	5
4	(Argentina) Nicolás Oroz	Argentinos Juniors	4
4	(Argentina) Marcelo Estigarribia	Atlético Tucumán	4
4	(Argentina) Bruno Sepúlveda	Banfield	4
4	(Peru) Luis Advíncula	Boca Juniors	4
4	(Argentina) Kevin Zenón	Boca Juniors	4
4	(Argentina) Kevin López	Defensa y Justicia	4
4	(Argentina) Pablo de Blasis	Gimnasia y Esgrima (LP)	4
4	(Argentina) Tomás Conechny	Godoy Cruz	4
4	(Argentina) Matías Reali	Independiente Rivadavia	4
4	(Argentina) Santiago Solari	Racing	4
4	(Argentina) Ignacio Fernández	River Plate	4
4	(Paraguay) Ramón Sosa	Talleres (C)	4
4	(Argentina) Lucas Gamba	Unión	4

Source: AFA

== See also ==
- 2024 Argentine Primera División
- 2024 Copa Argentina
