= Copa de la Liga Profesional =

Official Argentine football competition

- The trophy awarded to the champions
- Organiser(s): Liga Profesional de Fútbol (LPF)
- Founded: 2020; 6 years ago
- Abolished: 2025; 1 year ago
- Region: Argentina
- Qualifier for: Copa Libertadores; Trofeo de Campeones
- Last champions: Estudiantes (LP) (2024)
- Most championships: Boca Juniors (2 titles)
- Broadcasters: ESPN Premium; TNT Sports; ESPN; TyC Sports
- Website: ligaprofesional.ar
- 2024 Copa de la Liga Profesional

The Copa de la Liga Profesional (English: Professional League Cup; officially named "Copa Diego Armando Maradona" in its first edition) was an official Argentine football cup competition. The cup was planned and organised by the "Liga Profesional de Fútbol", a body linked to the Argentine Football Association (AFA) that replaced the defunct Superliga Argentina. This cup was conceived as a contingency competition after the schedule for a regular league season had been repeatedly delayed because of the COVID-19 pandemic.

After the death of Diego Maradona in November 2020, the competition was named after him. Nevertheless, the LPF executives decided to suppress the "Diego Maradona" name to keep distance from the conflict between Maradona's heirs and lawyer Matías Morla, owner of the brand and former representative of Maradona.

Boca Juniors was the first champion of the competition, after beating Banfield in the final.

== Format ==
The first edition was contested by the 24 teams that had taken part in the 2019–20 Primera División championship, drawn into six groups of four teams each, playing on a double round-robin basis. In each zone, the top two teams advanced to the "Fase Campeón" while the bottom two teams advanced to the "Fase Complementación".

In the Fase Campeón, the 12 qualified teams were split into two groups of six teams each, where they played a single round-robin tournament. The winners of each group played the final match at a neutral venue. The winner of the Fase Campeón final were crowned champion of the cup also qualifying for Copa Libertadores.

On the other hand, teams in Fase Complementación played under the same format as in the Fase Campeón. The winners of the Fase Complementación final played a match against the Fase Campeón runners-up with the winners qualifying for the Copa Sudamericana.

The second edition had a similar format with a total of 26 teams including two promoted from Primera Nacional. Teams were drawn into two groups of 13 teams each, playing on a single round-robin a total of 13 rounds.

== List of champions ==
- (In bracket, title count):

Ed.	Year	Champion	Score	Runner-up	Venue	Province
1	2020	Boca Juniors (1)	1–1 (5–3 (p))	Banfield	del Bicentenario	San Juan
2	2021	Colón (1)	3–0	Racing	del Bicentenario	San Juan
3	2022	Boca Juniors (2)	3–0	Tigre	Mario Kempes	Córdoba
4	2023	Rosario Central (1)	1–0	Platense	Madre de Ciudades	Santiago del Estero
5	2024	Estudiantes (LP) (1)	1–1 (4–3 (p))	Vélez Sarsfield	Madre de Ciudades	Santiago del Estero

== Titles by club ==
Rank	Club	Titles	Runn.	Seasons won	Seasons run.
1	Boca Juniors	2	—	2020, 2022	—
2	Colón	1	—	2021	—
2	Rosario Central	1	—	2023	—
2	Estudiantes (LP)	1	—	2024	—
—	Banfield	0	1	—	2020
—	Racing	0	1	—	2021
—	Tigre	0	1	—	2022
—	Platense	0	1	—	2023
—	Vélez Sarsfield	0	1	—	2024

== Top scorers ==
Top 5 goalscorers, all-time (only group stage games)

Updated as of 8 January 2024

Rank	Nat.	Player	Years	Goals	Apps	Ratio
1	(Uruguay)	Miguel Merentiel	2020–	21	41	0.51
2	(Argentina)	Luis Rodríguez	2020–	21	44	0.48
3	(Argentina)	Cristian Tarragona	2020-	18	54	0.33
4	(Paraguay)	Gabriel Ávalos	2020-	16	42	0.38
5	(Argentina)	Mauro Boselli	2022–2023	14	20	0.7

== Historical table ==
Pos.	Club	Part.	Titles	Pld	W	D	L	GF	GA	GD	Pts
1	River Plate	5	0	71	37	18	16	131	68	+63	129
2	Vélez Sarsfield	5	0	71	35	21	15	89	66	+23	126
3	Boca Juniors	5	2	74	33	26	15	106	66	+40	125
4	Racing	5	0	72	31	24	17	107	72	+35	117
5	Estudiantes (LP)	5	1	71	28	23	20	90	67	+23	107
6	Argentinos Juniors	5	0	70	27	25	18	93	76	+17	106
7	Banfield	5	0	68	27	23	18	79	61	+18	104
8	Independiente	5	0	68	26	23	19	77	62	+15	101
9	Talleres (C)	5	0	67	23	24	20	84	79	+5	93
10	Rosario Central	5	1	70	25	17	28	80	88	-8	92
11	Newell's Old Boys	5	0	66	25	14	17	75	77	-2	89
12	Godoy Cruz	5	0	69	22	23	24	78	87	-9	89
13	Huracán	5	0	67	23	19	25	79	80	-1	88
14	Defensa y Justicia	5	0	68	22	22	24	85	93	-8	88
15	San Lorenzo	5	0	66	19	29	18	67	70	-3	86
16	Unión	5	0	66	21	23	22	67	73	-6	86
17	Gimnasia y Esgrima (LP)	5	0	66	23	17	26	85	95	-10	86
18	Colón	4	1	55	23	16	16	83	58	+25	85
19	Lanús	5	0	66	22	18	26	78	80	-2	84
20	Atlético Tucumán	5	0	66	19	21	26	76	94	-18	78
21	Central Córdoba (SdE)	5	0	66	16	24	26	63	92	-29	72
22	Platense	4	0	58	15	19	24	49	75	-26	64
23	Barracas Central	3	0	43	16	11	16	47	63	-16	59
24	Sarmiento (J)	4	0	55	13	19	23	44	70	-26	58
25	Arsenal	4	0	52	13	17	22	56	72	-16	56
26	Aldosivi	3	0	39	12	7	20	43	69	-17	43
27	Tigre	3	0	45	10	12	23	34	55	-21	42
28	Instituto	2	0	28	9	10	9	29	24	+5	37
29	Belgrano	2	0	29	8	11	10	40	41	-1	35
30	Patronato	3	0	38	8	4	26	27	58	-31	28
31	Deportivo Riestra	1	0	14	3	4	7	8	16	-8	13
32	Independiente Rivadavia	1	0	14	2	2	10	13	25	-12	8
