= Trofeo de Campeones de la Liga Profesional =

Trofeo de Campeones (LPF)
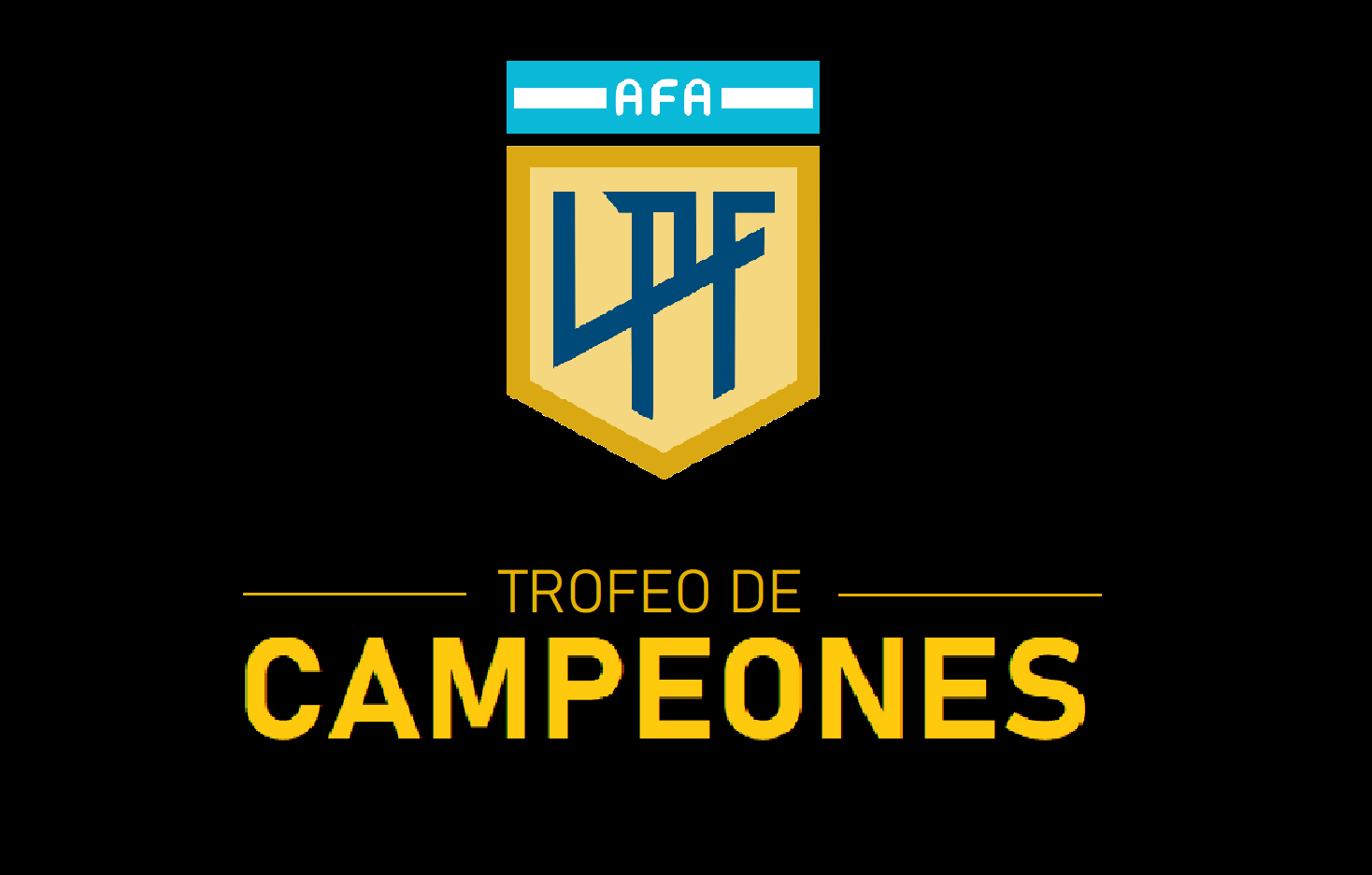
- Organiser(s): AFA
- Founded: 2020; 6 years ago
- Region: Argentina
- Teams: 2
- Related competitions: Liga Profesional; Supercopa Internacional; Supercopa Argentina; Copa LPF (former)
- Current champions: Estudiantes (LP) (2nd title)
- Most championships: Estudiantes (LP); River Plate (2 titles each)
- Broadcaster(s): Fox Sports; TNT Sports

The Trofeo de Campeones de la Liga Profesional (English: Professional League Champions Trophy) is an official national football cup of Argentina organized by the Argentine Football Association (AFA) and contested by the winners of the Apertura Tournament and Clausura Tournament.

The competition is successor of Trofeo de Campeones organised by defunct Superliga Argentina, which was only played once.

== Overview ==
The first edition was planned to be held in 2020 but it was suspended due to the COVID-19 pandemic therefore the trophy was first contested in 2021 when River Plate (2021 Primera División champion) and Colón (2021 Copa de la Liga Profesional champion) faced each other. The match was held in Estadio Único Madre de Ciudades in Santiago del Estero on December 18, 2021. River Plate beat Colón 4–0, winning their first Trofeo de Campeones title.

In October 2022, the AFA determined that the postponed 2020 edition would be held on 1 March 2023. As Boca Juniors won both the 2019–20 Primera División and the 2020 Copa LPF, River Plate and Banfield (the runners-up in those competitions) played a semi-final on 22 February 2023 to determine who would play Boca Juniors in the final.

As Copa de la Liga was discontinued, since 2025 the Trofeo de Campeones is contested by the winners of Apertura and Clausura tournaments. The winner of this cup is also eligible to play other national cups such as Supercopa Argentina and Supercopa Internacional.

== List of champions ==
Keys

- PD: Winner of Primera División.
- CLP: Winner of Copa de la Liga Profesional.
- TA: Winner of Torneo Apertura
- TC: Winner of Torneo Clausura
- (In bracket, title count)

Ed.	Year	Winner	Score	Runner-up	Venue	City
1	2020	(not held due to scheduling problems)				
2	2021	River Plate (PD) (1)	4–0	Colón (CLP)	Estadio Único Madre de Ciudades	Santiago del Estero
3	2022	Racing (PD) (Note: As runner-up.) (1)	2–1	Boca Juniors (PD)	Estadio Único La Pedrera	Villa Mercedes
4	2023	River Plate (PD) (2)	2–0	Rosario Central (CLP)	Estadio Único Madre de Ciudades	Santiago del Estero
5	2024	Estudiantes (LP) (CLP) (1)	3–0	Vélez Sarsfield (PD)	Estadio Único Madre de Ciudades	Santiago del Estero
6	2025	Estudiantes (LP) (TC) (2)	2–1	Platense (TA)	Estadio Único de San Nicolás	San Nicolás

== Titles by club ==
Rank	Club	Titles	Runn.	Seasons won	Seasons run.
1	River Plate	2	—	2021, 2023	—
1	Estudiantes (LP)	2	—	2024, 2025	—
2	Racing	1	—	2022	—
—	Colón	0	1	—	2021
—	Boca Juniors	0	1	—	2022
—	Rosario Central	0	1	—	2023
—	Vélez Sarsfield	0	1	—	2024
—	Platense	0	1	—	2025
