= 2024 Copa Argentina final =

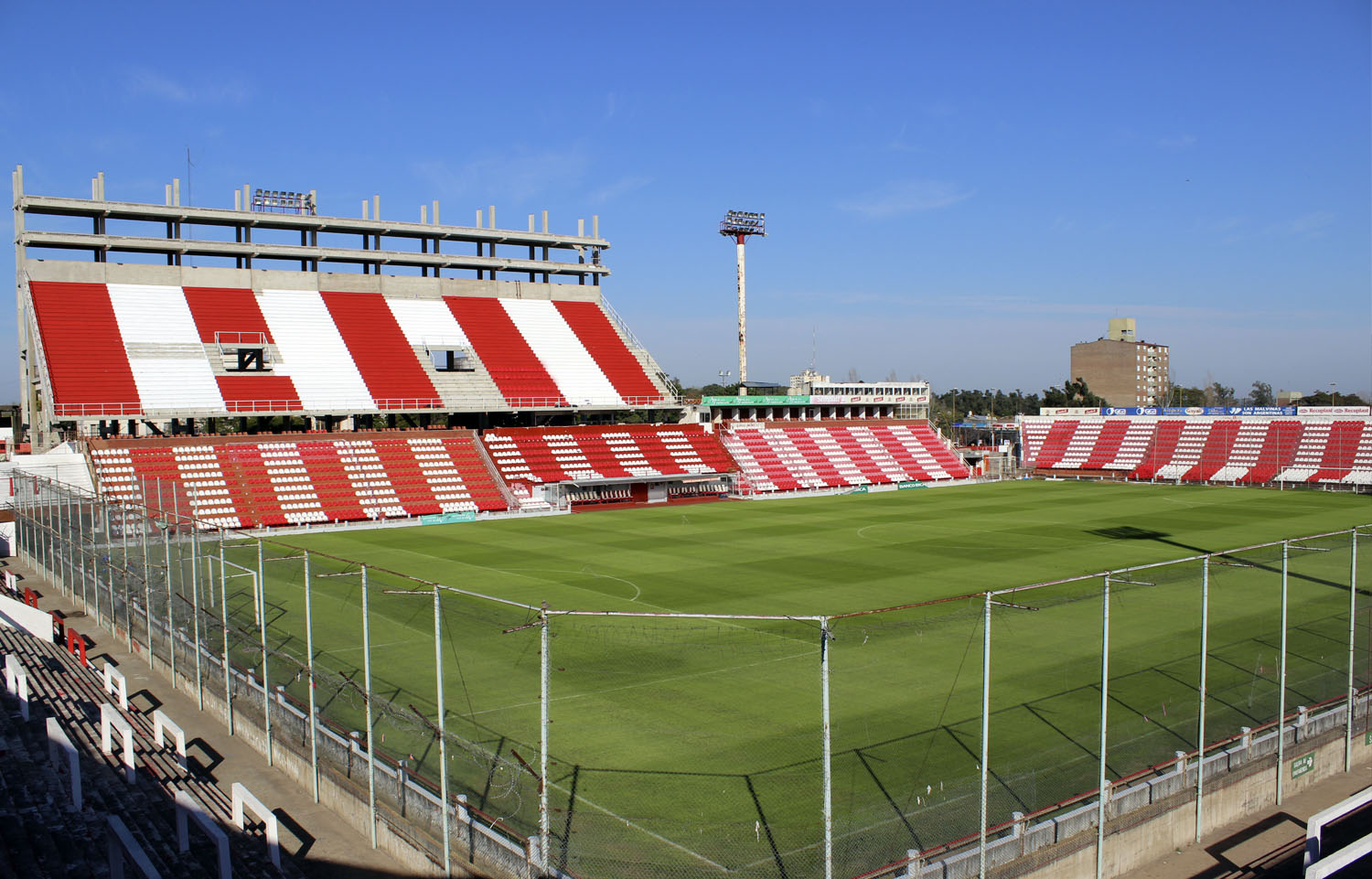
- Estadio 15 de Abril, venue
- Event: 2024 Copa Argentina
Vélez Sarsfield	Central Córdoba (SdE)
0	1
- Date: 11 December 2024
- Venue: Estadio 15 de Abril, Santa Fe
- Man of the Match: Matías Godoy (Central Córdoba (SdE))
- Referee: Yael Falcón Pérez

The 2024 Copa Argentina final was the 63rd and final match of the 2024 Copa Argentina. It was played on 11 December 2024 at Estadio 15 de Abril in Santa Fe between Vélez Sarsfield and Central Córdoba (SdE).

Central Córdoba (SdE) defeated Vélez Sarsfield 1–0 to win their first title in the tournament. As winners, they qualified for the group stage of the 2025 Copa Libertadores and earned the right to play the winners of the 2024 Argentine Primera División in the 2024 Supercopa Argentina.

== Qualified teams ==
Team	Previous finals app.
Vélez Sarsfield	None^{1}
Central Córdoba (SdE)	1 (2019)

Bold indicates winning years

Note

1. Vélez Sarsfield reached the final of the 1970 Copa Argentina but the competition was abandoned as the second leg of the final was never played.

== Road to the final ==
Vélez Sarsfield			Round	Central Córdoba (SdE)		
Opponent	Venue	Score		Opponent	Venue	Score
Sportivo Las Parejas	Florida	2–1	Round of 64	Quilmes	Turdera	3–1
Arsenal	Quilmes	2–1	Round of 32	Estudiantes (LP)	Córdoba	2–1
San Lorenzo	Avellaneda	3–1	Round of 16	Newell's Old Boys	San Nicolás de los Arroyos	0–0 (3–2 p)
Independiente	Lanús	1–0	Quarter-finals	Temperley	San Nicolás de los Arroyos	2–1
Boca Juniors	Córdoba	4–3	Semi-finals	Huracán	San Nicolás de los Arroyos	2–1

== Match details ==
Thiago Fernández (Vélez Sarsfield) missed the final because of an ACL injury to his right knee.

11 December 2024
21:10

Vélez Sarsfield	0–1	Central Córdoba (SdE)
	Report	Godoy 53'

Estadio 15 de Abril, Santa Fe
Referee: Yael Falcón Pérez

**Vélez Sarsfield**	**Central Córdoba (SdE)**

GK	1	(Argentina) Tomás Marchiori
DF	4	(Argentina) Joaquín García		(substituted off) 72'
DF	2	(Argentina) Emanuel Mammana
DF	31	(Argentina) Valentín Gómez
DF	3	(Argentina) Elías Gómez
MF	5	(Syria) Jalil Elías
MF	32	(Argentina) Christian Ordóñez		(substituted off) 46'
MF	26	(Argentina) Agustín Bouzat (c)	(yellow card) 31'
FW	28	(Argentina) Maher Carrizo		(substituted off) 80'
FW	9	(Argentina) Braian Romero		(substituted off) 72'
FW	11	(Argentina) Matías Pellegrini		(substituted off) 59'
Substitutes:
GK	12	(Uruguay) Randall Rodríguez
DF	6	(Argentina) Aarón Quirós
DF	14	(Argentina) Agustín Lagos		(substituted on) 72'
DF	19	(Argentina) Leonel Roldán
DF	23	(Argentina) Patricio Pernicone
DF	34	(Argentina) Damián Fernández
MF	20	(Argentina) Francisco Pizzini		(substituted on) 72'
MF	22	(Argentina) Claudio Aquino		(substituted on) 46'
MF	35	(Argentina) Santiago Cáseres
FW	7	(Uruguay) Michael Santos		(substituted on) 59'
FW	36	(Argentina) Álvaro Montoro		(substituted on) 80'
FW	48	(Argentina) Francisco Montoro
Manager:
(Bolivia) Gustavo Quinteros			(yellow card) 41'

GK	1	(Argentina) Luis Ingolotti
DF	2	(Argentina) Lucas Abascia		(substituted off) 46'
DF	15	(Uruguay) Yonatthan Rak
DF	6	(Argentina) Sebastián Valdez (c)
MF	13	(Argentina) Rafael Barrios
MF	32	(Argentina) Kevin Vázquez	(yellow card) 58'
MF	25	(Paraguay) José Florentín	(yellow card) 43'
MF	26	(Argentina) Juan Andrés Meli
MF	8	(Argentina) Rodrigo Atencio		(substituted off) 86'
MF	11	(Argentina) Matías Godoy	(yellow card) 70'	(substituted off) 73'
FW	29	(Argentina) Favio Cabral	(yellow card) 90+6'	(substituted off) 90+7'
Substitutes:
GK	23	(Argentina) Lautaro Bursich
DF	3	(Argentina) Leonardo Marchi
DF	4	(Argentina) Iván Pillud
DF	16	(Uruguay) Federico Andueza
DF	20	(Argentina) Fernando Martínez		(substituted on) 86'
MF	5	(Argentina) Cristian Vega
MF	10	(Argentina) Elías Cabrera
MF	27	(Uruguay) Nicolás Quagliata
MF	38	(Argentina) Manuel Palavecino
FW	7	(Argentina) Matías Benítez		(substituted on) 90+7'
FW	18	(Colombia) Luis Angulo		(substituted on) 46'
FW	21	(Argentina) Alexis Segovia		(substituted on) 73'
Manager:
(Argentina) Omar De Felippe			(yellow card) 58'

Man of the Match:
(Argentina) Matías Godoy (Central Córdoba (SdE))

Assistant referees:
Juan Pablo Belatti
Gabriel Chade
Fourth official:
Brian Ferreyra
Fifth official:
Eric Grünmann

**Match rules**

- 90 minutes.
- Penalty shoot-out if scores still level.
- Twelve named substitutes.
- Maximum of five substitutions.

=== Statistics ===
Overall
Vélez Sarsfield	Vélez Sarsfield	Central Córdoba (SdE)
Goals scored	0	1
Total shots	12	5
Shots on target	7	2
Ball possession	64%	36%
Corner kicks	9	1
Fouls committed	10	13
Offsides	2	1
Yellow cards	2	5
Red cards	0	0
