= 2025 Central Córdoba de Santiago del Estero season =

Central Córdoba de Santiago del Estero
2025 season
- Manager: Omar De Felippe
- Stadium: Alfredo Terrera
- Torneo Apertura: 11th
- Torneo Clausura: Quarter-finals
- Copa Argentina: Round of 64
- Supercopa Argentina: Runner-up
- Copa Libertadores: Group stage
- Copa Sudamericana: Round of 16
Home colours	Away colours	Third colours

The 2025 season was the 119th for Club Atlético Central Córdoba and their 6th consecutive season in the Primera División. The club also participated in the Copa Argentina, Supercopa Argentina, Copa Libertadores, and Copa Sudamericana.

== Squad ==
=== Current squad ===
As of 1 February, 2025.

Note: Flags indicate national team as defined under FIFA eligibility rules; some limited exceptions apply. Players may hold more than one non-FIFA nationality.

No.	Pos.	Nation	Player
1	GK	ARG	Alan Aguerre
2	DF	ARG	Lucas Abascia (on loan from Ñublense)
3	DF	ARG	Leonardo Marchi
4	DF	ARG	Iván Pillud
5	MF	ARG	Cristian Vega
6	DF	ARG	Facundo Mansilla
7	FW	COL	Luis Angulo (on loan from Talleres)
8	MF	ARG	Iván Gómez (on loan from Atlético Platense)
9	FW	ARG	Lucas Varaldo
10	FW	ARG	Gastón Verón (on loan from Argentinos Juniors)
11	FW	ARG	Matías Perelló (on loan from Argentinos Juniors)
12	MF	ARG	Leonardo Heredia (on loan from Argentinos Juniors)
13	GK	ARG	Javier Vallejos
14	DF	ARG	Gonzalo Trindade (on loan from River Plate)
15	MF	URU	Sebastián Cristóforo
16	MF	ARG	Manuel Palavecino

No.	Pos.	Nation	Player
17	DF	ARG	Yuri Casermeiro
18	FW	ARG	David Zalazar (on loan from Talleres)
19	DF	ARG	Lautaro Rivero (on loan from River Plate)
20	DF	ARG	Fernando Martínez
21	MF	ARG	Dylan Glaby
23	GK	ARG	Lautaro Bursich
24	DF	ARG	Braian Cufré
25	MF	PAR	José Florentín
26	MF	ARG	Diego Barrera (on loan from Talleres)
27	FW	URU	Nicolás Quagliata (on loan from PAOK)
29	FW	ARG	Favio Cabral (on loan from Mitre (SdE))
30	DF	ARG	Lautaro Montoya (on loan from Estudiantes BA)
32	DF	ARG	Jonathan Galván (on loan from Argentinos Juniors)
33	DF	ARG	Santiago Moyano
—	GK	ARG	Juan Pablo Zozaya (on loan from Estudiantes de La Plata)

=== Transfers In ===
Pos.	Player	Transferred from	Fee	Date	Source
DF	(Argentina) Braian Cufré	Unattached		3 January 2025	
MF	(Argentina) Dylan Glaby	(Chile) Coquimbo Unido	Loan	16 January 2025	
MF	(Argentina) Lucas Besozzi	(Argentina) Lanús	Loan	24 June 2025	

=== Transfers Out ===
Pos.	Player	Transferred to	Fee	Date	Source
MF	(Argentina) Dylan Glaby	(Chile) Coquimbo Unido	Loan return	30 June 2025	

== Competitions ==
=== Overall record ===
Competition	First match	Last match	Starting round	Final position	Record							
Competition	First match	Last match	Starting round	Final position	Pld	W	D	L	GF	GA	GD	Win %
Torneo Apertura	26 January 2025	2 May 2025	Matchday 1	11th	16	5	3	8	21	22	−1	31.25
Torneo Clausura	11 July 2025	29 November 2025	Matchday 1	Quarter-finals	18	6	9	3	19	13	+6	33.33
Copa Argentina	22 March 2025		Round of 64	Round of 64	1	0	0	1	0	1	−1	0.00
Supercopa Argentina	6 September 2025		Finals	Runner-up	1	0	0	1	0	2	−2	0.00
Copa Libertadores	3 April 2025	28 May 2025	Group stage	Group stage	6	3	2	1	7	7	+0	50.00
Copa Sudamericana	15 July 2025	21 August 2025	Play-offs	Round of 16	4	2	1	1	4	1	+3	50.00
Total					46	16	15	15	51	46	+5	34.78

Source: Competitions

=== Primera División ===
==== Torneo Apertura ====
===== League table =====
Pos	Team	Pld	W	D	L	GF	GA	GD	Pts
9	Newell's Old Boys	16	5	4	7	12	15	−3	19
10	Defensa y Justicia	16	5	4	7	18	22	−4	19
11	Central Córdoba (SdE)	16	5	3	8	21	22	−1	18
12	Belgrano	16	3	8	5	13	23	−10	17
13	Aldosivi	16	4	3	9	18	28	−10	15

Source: AFA

===== Results by round =====
Round	1
Ground	H
Result	
Position	

A = Away; H = Home; W = Win; D = Draw; L = Loss

===== Matches =====
Win Draw Loss Postponed

26 January 2025 1	Central Córdoba	1–0	Aldosivi	Santiago del Estero
21:00 UTC−3	Verón 74'	Report		Stadium: Alfredo Terrera

30 January 2025 2	Central Córdoba	2–0	Atlético Tucumán	Santiago del Estero
21:30 UTC−3	Heredia 44'; Gómez 55'	Report		Stadium: Estadio Único Madre de Ciudades

3 February 2025 3	Defensa y Justicia	2–1	Central Córdoba	Gobernador Costa
17:00 UTC−3	Togni 65', 79'	Report	Angulo 63'	Stadium: Estadio Norberto "Tito" Tomaghello

7 February 2025 4	Central Córdoba	2–0	Newell's Old Boys	Santiago del Estero
20:00 UTC−3	Heredia 36'; Florentín 90+7'	Report		Stadium: Estadio Único Madre de Ciudades

11 February 2025 5	Barracas Central	3–3	Central Córdoba	Sarandí
17:45 UTC−3	Candia 55'; Ruiz 73'; Insúa 90+6' (pen.)		Florentín 62'; Bruera 75' (o.g.); Rivero 80'	Stadium: Estadio Julio Humberto Grondona

15 February 2025 6	Central Córdoba	4–0	Belgrano	Santiago del Estero
19:15 UTC−3	Cabral 18'; Florentín 42'; Rivero 61'; Barrera 87'	Report		Stadium: Estadio Único Madre de Ciudades

21 February 2025 7	Estudiantes	3–2	Central Córdoba	La Plata
19:15 UTC−3	Giménez 69'; Tobio Burgos 71'; Arzamendia 84'	Report	Perelló 44'; Heredia 51'	Stadium: Estadio Jorge Luis Hirschi

28 February 2025 8	Central Córdoba	0–0	Deportivo Riestra	Santiago del Estero
22:15 UTC−3		Report		Stadium: Estadio Único Madre de Ciudades

7 March 2025 9	Central Córdoba	0–3	Boca Juniors	Santiago del Estero
21:15 UTC−3		Report	Giménez 16'; Florentín 36' (o.g.); Merentiel 89'	Stadium: Único Madre de Ciudades; Referee: Yael Falcón Pérez

17 March 2025 10	Tigre	1–2	Central Córdoba	Victoria
19:00 UTC−3	Oviedo 72'	Report	Verón 80' (pen.); Heredia 90+1'	Stadium: Estadio José Dellagiovanna

29 March 2025 11	Central Córdoba	1–1	Argentinos Juniors	Santiago del Estero
18:30 UTC−3	Perelló 81'		Molina 69'	Stadium: Estadio Único Madre de Ciudades

6 April 2025 12	Unión	1–0	Central Córdoba	Santa Fe
15:30 UTC−3	Gamba 30'	Report		Stadium: Estadio 15 de Abril

14 April 2025 13	Central Córdoba	1–2	Huracán	Santiago del Estero
18:00 UTC−3	Leonardo Heredia 42' (pen.)	Report	Mazzantti 32'; Miljevic 58' (pen.)	Stadium: Estadio Único Madre de Ciudades

18 April 2025 14	Racing	1–0	Central Córdoba	Avellaneda
19:15 UTC−3	Zuculini 45'	Report		Stadium: El Cilindro

28 April 2025 15	Central Córdoba	1–2	Independiente Rivadavia	Santiago del Estero
21:45 UTC−3	Verón 72' (pen.)	Report	Sartori 76'; Cardillo 81'	Stadium: Estadio Alfredo Terrera

2 May 2025 16	Banfield	3–1	Central Córdoba	Banfield
15:30 UTC−3	Río 1', 35'; Arturia 63'	Report	Verón 77'	Stadium: Estadio Florencio Sola

==== Torneo Clausura ====
===== League table =====
Pos	Team	Pld	W	D	L	GF	GA	GD	Pts	Qualification
2	Unión	16	6	7	3	20	13	+7	25	Advance to round of 16
3	Racing	16	7	4	5	16	13	+3	25	Advance to round of 16
4	Central Córdoba (SdE)	16	5	9	2	17	11	+6	24	Advance to round of 16
5	Argentinos Juniors	16	7	3	6	18	13	+5	24	Advance to round of 16
6	Barracas Central	16	5	8	3	19	17	+2	23	Advance to round of 16

Source: AFA

===== Matches =====
11 July 2025 1	Aldosivi	0–0	Central Córdoba	Mar del Plata
15:30 UTC−3		Report		Stadium: Estadio José María Minella

18 July 2025 2	Atlético Tucumán	1–1	Central Córdoba	Tucumán
21:30 UTC−3	Díaz 19'	Report	Perelló 61'	Stadium: Estadio Monumental José Fierro

28 July 2025 3	Central Córdoba	2–1	Defensa y Justicia	Santiago del Estero
18:00 UTC−3	Besozzi 10'; Verón 90+3'	Report	Pérez 54'	Stadium: Alfredo Terrera

8 August 2025 4	Newell's Old Boys	1–1	Central Córdoba	Rosario
21:00 UTC−3	Maroni 85'	Report	Verón 90'	Stadium: Estadio Marcelo Bielsa

17 August 2025 5	Central Córdoba	1–1	Barracas Central	Santiago del Estero
16:15 UTC−3	Abascia 60'	Report	Ruiz 16'	Stadium: Alfredo Terrera

25 August 2025 6	Belgrano	0–3	Central Córdoba	Córdoba
19:00 UTC−3		Report	Verón 3'; Barrera 53', 84'	Stadium: El Gigante de Alberdi

30 August 2025 7	Central Córdoba	2–0	Estudiantes	Santiago del Estero
17:00 UTC−3	Muslera 5' (o.g.); Perelló 10'	Report		Stadium: Alfredo Terrera

12 September 2025 8	Deportivo Riestra	2–0	Central Córdoba	Buenos Aires
14:30 UTC−3	Alonso 33'; Goitía 70'	Report		Stadium: Estadio Guillermo Laza

21 September 2025 9	Boca Juniors	2–2	Central Córdoba	Buenos Aires
16:45 UTC−3	Battaglia 41'; Merentiel 56'	Report	Florentín 62'; Gómez 83'	Stadium: La Bombonera; Referee: Yael Falcón Pérez

26 September 2025 10	Central Córdoba	0–1	Tigre	Santiago del Estero
21:15 UTC−3		Report	Cabrera 60'	Stadium: Estadio Único Madre de Ciudades

3 October 2025 11	Argentinos Juniors	0–0	Central Córdoba	Buenos Aires
21:15 UTC−3		Report		Stadium: Diego Armando Maradona

10 October 2025 12	Central Córdoba	3–1	Unión	Santiago del Estero
16:45 UTC−3	Galván 35'; Besozzi 62'; Perelló 90+5'	Report	Colazo 79'	Stadium: Estadio Único Madre de Ciudades

22 October 2025 13	Huracán	0–1	Central Córdoba	Buenos Aires
19:30 UTC−3		Report	Martínez 34'	Stadium: Estadio Tomás Adolfo Ducó

3 November 2025 14	Central Córdoba	0–0	Racing	Santiago del Estero
18:00 UTC−3		Report		Stadium: Estadio Único Madre de Ciudades

10 November 2025 15	Independiente Rivadavia	0–0	Central Córdoba	Mendoza
21:15 UTC−3		Report		Stadium: Estadio Bautista Gargantini

16 November 2025 16	Central Córdoba	1–1	Banfield	Santiago del Estero
20:15 UTC−3	Heredia 45+2'	Report	Río 78'	Stadium: Estadio Único Madre de Ciudades

===== Final stages =====
22 November 2025 Round of 16	Central Córdoba	2–1	San Lorenzo	Santiago del Estero
22:00	Varaldo 66' (pen.); Florentín 90'	Report	Gulli 45'	Stadium: Único Madre de Ciudades; Referee: Nazareno Arasa

29 November 2025 Quarter-finals	Central Córdoba	0–1	Estudiantes	Santiago del Estero
21:30		Report	Palacios 64'	Stadium: Único Madre de Ciudades; Referee: Yael Falcón Pérez

=== Copa Argentina ===
22 March 2025 Round of 64	Central Córdoba	0–1	Quilmes	Córdoba
21:30 UTC−3		Report	Machado 77'	Stadium: El Gigante de Alberdi; Referee: Pablo Echavarría

=== Supercopa Argentina ===
6 September 2025 Final	Vélez Sarsfield	2–0	Central Córdoba	Rosario
15:00 UTC−3	Gordon 50', 86'	Report		Stadium: Estadio Gigante de Arroyito; Referee: Facundo Tello

=== Copa Libertadores ===
==== Group stage ====
Pos	Team	Pld	W	D	L	GF	GA	GD	Pts	Qualification	LDQ	FLA	CCO	TAC
1	(Ecuador) LDU Quito	6	3	2	1	8	4	+4	11	Advance to round of 16	—	0–0	3–0	2–0
2	(Brazil) Flamengo	6	3	2	1	6	3	+3	11	Advance to round of 16	2–0	—	1–2	1–0
3	(Argentina) Central Córdoba	6	3	2	1	7	7	0	11	Transfer to Copa Sudamericana	0–0	1–1	—	2–1
4	(Venezuela) Deportivo Táchira	6	0	0	6	4	11	−7	0		2–3	0–1	1–2	—

Source: CONMEBOL
Rules for classification: 1) Points; 2) Goal difference; 3) Goals scored; 4) Away goals scored; 5) CONMEBOL ranking.

3 April 2025 1	Central Córdoba (Argentina)	0–0	(Ecuador) LDU Quito	Santiago del Estero
19:00 UTC−3		Report		Stadium: Estadio Único Madre de Ciudades; Attendance: 12,132; Referee: Leodán González (Uruguay)

9 April 2025 2	Flamengo (Brazil)	1–2	(Argentina) Central Córdoba	Rio de Janeiro, Brazil
21:30 UTC−3	De la Cruz 60'	Report	Heredia 24' (pen.); Florentín 44'	Stadium: Estádio do Maracanã; Referee: Cristian Garay (Chile)

24 April 2025 3	Central Córdoba (Argentina)	2–1	(Venezuela) Deportivo Táchira	Santiago del Estero
19:00 UTC−3	Angulo 4'; Quagliata 19'	Report	Requena 37'	Stadium: Estadio Único Madre de Ciudades; Referee: Jhon Ospina (Colombia)

7 May 2025 4	Central Córdoba (Argentina)	1–1	(Brazil) Flamengo	Santiago del Estero
21:30 UTC−3	Verón 61'	Report	De Arrascaeta 10'	Stadium: Estadio Único Madre de Ciudades; Referee: Felipe González (Chile)

13 May 2025 5	Deportivo Táchira (Venezuela)	1–2	(Argentina) Central Córdoba	San Cristóbal, Venezuela
18:00 UTC−4	Castillo 75'	Report	Galván 20'; Verón 76'	Stadium: Estadio Polideportivo de Pueblo Nuevo; Referee: Mathías de Armas (Uruguay)

28 May 2025 6	LDU Quito (Ecuador)	3–0	(Argentina) Central Córdoba	Quito, Ecuador
19:30 UTC−5	Alvarado 15'; Alzugaray 44', 53'	Report		Stadium: Estadio Rodrigo Paz Delgado; Referee: Felipe González (Chile)

=== Copa Sudamericana ===
==== Knockout round play-offs ====
15 July 2025 First leg	Central Córdoba (Argentina)	0–0	(Uruguay) Cerro Largo	Santiago del Estero
19:00 UTC−3		Report		Stadium: Estadio Único Madre de Ciudades (Note: Central Córdoba will play their knockout round play-off home match at Estadio Único Madre de Ciudades, Santiago del Estero instead of their regular stadium Estadio Alfredo Terrera, Santiago del Estero.); Attendance: 11,222; Referee: Roberto Pérez (Peru)

22 July 2025 Second leg	Cerro Largo (Uruguay)	0–3 (0–3 agg.)	(Argentina) Central Córdoba	Montevideo
19:00 UTC−3		Report	Perelló 14'; Heredia 58'; Barrera 90'	Stadium: Estadio Centenario (Note: Cerro Largo will play their knockout round play-off home match at Estadio Centenario, Montevideo instead of their regular stadium Estadio Arquitecto Antonio Eleuterio Ubilla, Melo which did not meet CONMEBOL requirements for this round.); Attendance: 1,267; Referee: Anderson Daronco (Brazil)

==== Round of 16 ====
14 August 2025 First leg	Central Córdoba (Argentina)	1–0	(Argentina) Lanús	Santiago del Estero
21:30 UTC−3	Verón 58'	Report		Stadium: Estadio Único Madre de Ciudades; Attendance: 11,763; Referee: Kevin Ortega (Peru)

21 August 2025 Second leg	Lanús (Argentina)	1–0 (1–1 agg.) (4–2 p)	(Argentina) Central Córdoba	Lanús
21:30 UTC−3	Aquino 90+1'	Report		Stadium: Estadio Ciudad de Lanús; Attendance: 14,999; Referee: Cristian Garay (Chile)
	Penalties
	Bou (penalty scored); Izquierdoz (penalty scored); Marcich (penalty scored); Moreno (penalty scored)		(penalty missed) Verón; (penalty missed) Cufré; (penalty scored) Galván; (penalty scored) Vera
