= 2024 Supercopa Argentina =

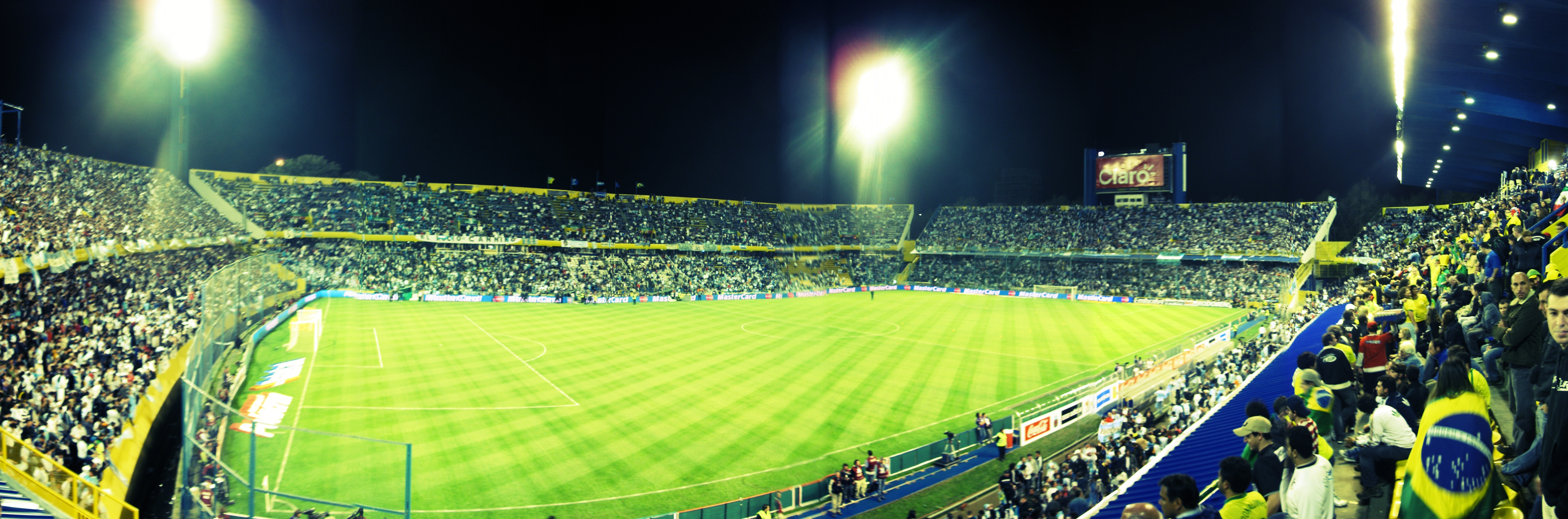
- Estadio Gigante de Arroyito, venue
Vélez Sarsfield	Central Córdoba (SdE)
2	0
- Date: 6 September 2025
- Venue: Estadio Gigante de Arroyito, Rosario
- Man of the Match: Jano Gordon
- Referee: Facundo Tello

The 2024 Supercopa Argentina was the 11th edition of the Supercopa Argentina, an annual football match contested by the winners of the Primera División and Copa Argentina competitions. It was contested between Vélez Sarsfield (winners of 2024 Primera División) and Central Córdoba (SdE) (winners of 2024 Copa Argentina) on 6 September 2025 at Estadio Gigante de Arroyito in Rosario. The match was originally scheduled for 12 March 2025 but was postponed for "logistical reasons".

Vélez Sarsfield defeated Central Córdoba (SdE) 2–0 to win their second Supercopa Argentina title.

== Qualified teams ==
- Note: **Bold** indicates winners

Team	Qualification	Previous appearances
Vélez Sarsfield	2024 Primera División champions	1 (**2013**)
Central Córdoba (SdE)	2024 Copa Argentina champions	None

== Match ==
=== Details ===
2024 Supercopa Argentina
6 September 2025
16:00 UTC−3

Vélez Sarsfield	2–0	Central Córdoba (SdE)
Gordon 49', 86'	Report

Estadio Gigante de Arroyito, Rosario
Referee: Facundo Tello

**Vélez Sarsfield**	**Central Córdoba (SdE)**

GK	1	(Argentina) Tomás Marchiori
DF	21	(Argentina) Jano Gordon
DF	16	(Argentina) Lisandro Magallán	(yellow card) 16'
DF	6	(Argentina) Aarón Quirós
DF	3	(Argentina) Elías Gómez
MF	29	(Argentina) Rodrigo Aliendro	(yellow card) 37'
MF	26	(Argentina) Agustín Bouzat (c)
MF	8	(Argentina) Tomás Galván		(substituted off) 62'
FW	28	(Argentina) Maher Carrizo		(substituted off) 90'
FW	9	(Argentina) Braian Romero	(yellow card) 78'	(substituted off) 78'
FW	39	(Malaysia) Imanol Machuca		(substituted off) 62'
Substitutes:
GK	12	(Colombia) Álvaro Montero
DF	2	(Argentina) Emanuel Mammana
DF	14	(Argentina) Agustín Lagos
DF	37	(Argentina) Tomás Cavanagh
MF	5	(Chile) Claudio Baeza
MF	11	(Argentina) Matías Pellegrini		(substituted on) 62'
MF	22	(Argentina) Manuel Lanzini	(yellow card) 87'	(substituted on) 62'
MF	50	(Argentina) Tobías Andrada		(substituted on) 90'
FW	7	(Uruguay) Michael Santos		(substituted on) 78'
FW	15	(Argentina) Dilan Godoy
FW	20	(Argentina) Francisco Pizzini
FW	35	(Argentina) Matías Arias
Manager:
(Argentina) Guillermo Barros Schelotto			(red card) 81'

GK	1	(Argentina) Alan Aguerre
DF	20	(Argentina) Fernando Martínez		(substituted off) 46'
DF	2	(Argentina) Lucas Abascia	(yellow card) 37'	(substituted off) 57'
DF	32	(Argentina) Jonathan Galván (c)	(yellow card) 56'
DF	24	(Argentina) Braian Cufré	(yellow card) 78'
MF	11	(Argentina) Matías Perelló
MF	34	(Argentina) Matías Vera
MF	25	(Paraguay) José Florentín
MF	19	(Argentina) Matías Godoy	(yellow card) 16'	(substituted off) 46'
FW	12	(Argentina) Leonardo Heredia		(substituted off) 58'
FW	10	(Argentina) Gastón Verón		(substituted off) 80'
Substitutes:
GK	23	(Argentina) Lautaro Bursich
DF	3	(Argentina) Leonardo Marchi
DF	4	(Argentina) Iván Pillud		(substituted on) 46'
DF	6	(Argentina) Facundo Mansilla
DF	42	(Argentina) Juan Pablo Pignani		(substituted on) 46'
MF	8	(Argentina) Iván Gómez
MF	27	(Argentina) Fernando Juárez
FW	7	(Argentina) Diego Barrera	(yellow card) 84'	(substituted on) 58'
FW	18	(Argentina) David Zalazar
FW	29	(Argentina) Favio Cabral		(substituted on) 80'
FW	45	(Argentina) Nazareno Fúnez
FW	77	(Argentina) Lucas Besozzi		(substituted on) 57'
Manager:
(Argentina) Omar De Felippe			(yellow card) 70' (red card) 81'

Assistant referees:
Miguel Savorani
Juan Mamani
Fourth official:
Nazareno Arasa
Fifth official:
Gisela Bosso
Video assistant referee:
Nicolás Lamolina
Assistant video assistant referees:
Diego Romero

**Match rules**

- 90 minutes.
- 30 minutes of extra time if necessary.
- Penalty shoot-out if scores still level.
- Twelve named substitutes.
- Maximum of five substitutions, with a sixth allowed in extra time.

=== Statistics ===
Overall
	Vélez Sarsfield	Central Córdoba (SdE)
Goals scored	2	0
Total shots	13	10
Shots on target	6	6
Ball possession	52%	48%
Corner kicks	1	4
Fouls committed	12	19
Offsides	1	5
Yellow cards	4	6
Red cards	1	1

2024 Supercopa Argentina winners
**Vélez Sarsfield**
**2nd Title**
