= 2024 Copa Argentina =

Tournament details
- Country: Argentina
- Dates: 25 January – 11 December 2024
- Teams: 64

Final positions
- Champions: Central Córdoba (SdE) (1st title)
- Runners-up: Vélez Sarsfield
- 2025 Copa Libertadores: Central Córdoba (SdE)

Tournament statistics
- Matches played: 63
- Goals scored: 142 (2.25 per match)
- Top goal scorer(s): Rodrigo Atencio; Edinson Cavani (4 goals each)

Awards
- Best player: Luis Ingolotti

The 2024 Copa Argentina (officially the Copa Argentina AXION energy 2024 for sponsorship reasons) was the fourteenth edition of the Copa Argentina, and the twelfth since the relaunch of the tournament in 2011. The competition began on 25 January and ended on 11 December 2024. Estudiantes (LP) were the defending champions but were eliminated in the round of 32.

Central Córdoba (SdE) defeated Vélez Sarsfield 1–0 in the final to win their first title in the tournament. As winners, they qualified for the 2025 Copa Libertadores group stage and earned the right to play against the winners of the 2024 Argentine Primera División in the 2024 Supercopa Argentina.

== Teams ==
The 64 teams that took part in this competition included: all twenty-eight teams from the Primera División; fifteen teams of the Primera Nacional; five from the Primera B, four from the Primera C; two from the Primera D and ten teams from Federal A.

=== First Level ===
==== Primera División ====
All twenty-eight teams of the 2023 tournament qualified.

- Argentinos Juniors
- Arsenal
- Atlético Tucumán
- Banfield
- Barracas Central
- Belgrano
- Boca Juniors
- Central Córdoba (SdE)
- Colón
- Defensa y Justicia
- Estudiantes (LP)^{TH}
- Gimnasia y Esgrima (LP)
- Godoy Cruz
- Huracán
- Independiente
- Instituto
- Lanús
- Newell's Old Boys
- Platense
- Racing
- River Plate
- Rosario Central
- San Lorenzo
- Sarmiento (J)
- Talleres (C)
- Tigre
- Unión
- Vélez Sarsfield

=== Second Level ===
==== Primera Nacional ====
The top 7 teams in each group plus the best eighth-placed one of the 2023 tournament qualified.

- Agropecuario Argentino
- Almirante Brown
- Atlético de Rafaela
- Chacarita Juniors
- Defensores de Belgrano
- Deportivo Maipú
- Deportivo Riestra
- Estudiantes (RC)
- Gimnasia y Esgrima (M)
- Independiente Rivadavia
- Mitre (SdE)
- Quilmes
- San Martín (SJ)
- San Martín (T)
- Temperley

=== Third Level ===
==== Primera B Metropolitana ====
The champions and the top four teams of the 2023 Primera B tournament qualified.

- Argentino (Q)
- Comunicaciones
- Los Andes
- San Miguel
- Talleres (RdE)

==== Torneo Federal A ====
The top two teams plus the two best third-placed teams of each zone of the 2023 tournament qualified.

- Argentino (MM)
- Central Norte
- Ciudad de Bolivar
- Douglas Haig
- Gimnasia y Tiro
- Independiente (Ch)
- Juventud Unida Universitario
- Sportivo Las Parejas
- Olimpo
- Villa Mitre

=== Fourth Level ===
==== Primera C Metropolitana ====
The champions, the top two teams and the winners of the "Torneo Reducido" of the 2023 Primera C tournament qualified.

- Excursionistas
- Laferrere
- Midland
- San Martín (B)

=== Fifth Level ===
==== Primera D Metropolitana ====
The champions and the winners of the "First Tournament" of 2023 Primera D qualified.

- Centro Español
- El Porvenir

== Round and draw dates ==
Phase	Round	Draw date	Dates
Final stage	Round of 64	19 December 2023	25 January–15 May 2024
Final stage	Round of 32	19 December 2023	2 May–17 July 2024
Final stage	Round of 16	19 December 2023	31 July–7 September 2024
Final stage	Quarterfinals	19 December 2023	18 September–23 October 2024
Final stage	Semifinals	19 December 2023	24 October–27 November 2024
Final stage	Final	19 December 2023	11 December 2024

== Final rounds ==
=== Draw ===
The draw for the finals rounds was held on 19 December 2023, 14:00 at the AFA Futsal Stadium in Ezeiza. The 64 qualified teams were divided into four groups. The historical rivals that play in the Argentine First Division and are champions of AFA tournaments were paired and directly assigned to Group 1. The teams in Group 2, Group 3 and Group 4 were seeded according to their historical performance and division, with the teams in Group 2 also divided into pairs of historical rivals. From Group 1 and Group 2, the first team drawn was placed in a predetermined bracket and its historical rival was placed in the other. The matches were drawn from the respective confronts: Group 1 vs. Group 3; Group 2 vs. Group 4. With this draw format, historical rivals could only play against each other in the final

Group 1		Group 3	Group 4
Boca Juniors; Independiente; Huracán; Estudiantes (LP); Newell's Old Boys; Argentinos Juniors; Banfield	River Plate; Racing; San Lorenzo; Gimnasia y Esgrima (LP); Rosario Central; Vélez Sarsfield; Lanús	Argentino (MM); Central Norte; Centro Español; Ciudad de Bolivar; Douglas Haig; El Porvenir; Excursionistas; Gimnasia y Tiro; Independiente (Ch); Juventud Unida Universitario; Laferrere; Midland; Olimpo; San Martín (B); Sportivo Las Parejas; Villa Mitre	Agropecuario Argentino; Argentino (Q); Atlético de Rafaela; Chacarita Juniors; Comunicaciones; Defensores de Belgrano; Estudiantes (RC); Gimnasia y Esgrima (M); Los Andes; Mitre (SdE); Quilmes; San Martín (SJ); San Martín (T); San Miguel; Talleres (RdE); Temperley
Group 2		Argentino (MM); Central Norte; Centro Español; Ciudad de Bolivar; Douglas Haig; El Porvenir; Excursionistas; Gimnasia y Tiro; Independiente (Ch); Juventud Unida Universitario; Laferrere; Midland; Olimpo; San Martín (B); Sportivo Las Parejas; Villa Mitre	Agropecuario Argentino; Argentino (Q); Atlético de Rafaela; Chacarita Juniors; Comunicaciones; Defensores de Belgrano; Estudiantes (RC); Gimnasia y Esgrima (M); Los Andes; Mitre (SdE); Quilmes; San Martín (SJ); San Martín (T); San Miguel; Talleres (RdE); Temperley
Colón; Belgrano; Godoy Cruz; Arsenal; Barracas Central; Atlético Tucumán; Tigre; Instituto; Almirante Brown	Unión; Talleres (C); Independiente Rivadavia; Defensa y Justicia; Deportivo Riestra; Central Córdoba (SdE); Platense; Deportivo Maipú; Sarmiento (J)	Argentino (MM); Central Norte; Centro Español; Ciudad de Bolivar; Douglas Haig; El Porvenir; Excursionistas; Gimnasia y Tiro; Independiente (Ch); Juventud Unida Universitario; Laferrere; Midland; Olimpo; San Martín (B); Sportivo Las Parejas; Villa Mitre	Agropecuario Argentino; Argentino (Q); Atlético de Rafaela; Chacarita Juniors; Comunicaciones; Defensores de Belgrano; Estudiantes (RC); Gimnasia y Esgrima (M); Los Andes; Mitre (SdE); Quilmes; San Martín (SJ); San Martín (T); San Miguel; Talleres (RdE); Temperley

=== Bracket ===
==== Upper bracket ====
Round of 64
Boca Juniors	3
Central Norte	0
Almirante Brown (p)	3 (3)
San Martín (T)	3 (1)
Talleres (C)	3
Agropecuario Argentino	0
Colón	2
Los Andes	1
Rosario Central (p)	1 (4)
Douglas Haig	1 (3)
Barracas Central (p)	0 (4)
San Miguel	0 (2)
Atlético Tucumán	4
Defensores de Belgrano	0
Gimnasia y Esgrima (LP)	2
Centro Español	1
San Lorenzo	1
Independiente (Ch)	0
Tigre	1 (4)
Chacarita Juniors (p)	1 (5)
Arsenal	1
Estudiantes (RC)	0
Vélez Sarsfield	2
Sportivo Las Parejas	1
Lanús	0
El Porvenir	1
Godoy Cruz (p)	0 (4)
San Martín (SJ)	0 (3)
Deportivo Maipú	1 (7)
Juventud Unida Universitario (p)	1 (8)
Independiente	3
Laferrere	0

Round of 32
Boca Juniors	2
Almirante Brown	1
Talleres (C)	1
Colón	0
Rosario Central	0
Barracas Central	1
Atlético Tucumán	1
Gimnasia y Esgrima (LP)	2
San Lorenzo	2
Chacarita Juniors	0
Arsenal	1
Vélez Sarsfield	2
El Porvenir	0
Godoy Cruz	4
Juventud Unida Universitario	0
Independiente	2

Round of 16
Boca Juniors (p)	1 (8)
Talleres (C)	1 (7)
Barracas Central	0
Gimnasia y Esgrima (LP)	1
San Lorenzo	1
Vélez Sarsfield	3
Godoy Cruz	0
Independiente	3

Quarterfinals
Boca Juniors (p)	1 (2)
Gimnasia y Esgrima (LP)	1 (1)
Vélez Sarsfield	1
Independiente	0

Semifinals
Boca Juniors	3
Vélez Sarsfield	4

==== Lower bracket ====
Round of 64
Racing	3
San Martín (B)	0
Instituto	1
Talleres (RdE)	2
Independiente Rivadavia	1
Argentino (Q)	0
Banfield	6
Ciudad de Bolivar	0
Argentinos Juniors	2
Gimnasia y Tiro	1
Defensa y Justicia	1
Atlético de Rafaela	2
Platense (p)	0 (4)
Olimpo	0 (2)
Huracán (p)	0 (4)
Villa Mitre	0 (2)
Estudiantes (LP)	3
Argentino (MM)	0
Central Córdoba (SdE)	3
Quilmes	1
Deportivo Riestra	1
Comunicaciones	0
Newell's Old Boys	2
Midland	0
Unión	1
Gimnasia y Esgrima (M)	2
Belgrano	1
Mitre (SdE)	2
Sarmiento (J)	1 (3)
Temperley (p)	1 (4)
River Plate	3
Excursionistas	0

Round of 32
Racing	1
Talleres (RdE)	2
Independiente Rivadavia	1
Banfield	2
Argentinos Juniors	1
Atlético de Rafaela	0
Platense	0 (4)
Huracán (p)	0 (5)
Estudiantes (LP)	1
Central Córdoba (SdE)	2
Deportivo Riestra	0
Newell's Old Boys	1
Gimnasia y Esgrima (M)	0
Mitre (SdE)	1
Temperley (p)	1 (5)
River Plate	1 (4)

Round of 16
Talleres (RdE) (p)	1 (4)
Banfield	1 (3)
Argentinos Juniors	1 (4)
Huracán (p)	1 (5)
Central Córdoba (SdE) (p)	0 (3)
Newell's Old Boys	0 (2)
Mitre (SdE)	0 (2)
Temperley (p)	0 (3)

Quarterfinals
Talleres (RdE)	0
Huracán	1
Central Córdoba (SdE)	2
Temperley	1

Semifinals
Huracán	1
Central Córdoba (SdE)	2

=== Round of 64 ===
The Round of 64 had 10 qualified teams from the Torneo Federal A, 11 qualified teams from the Metropolitan Zone (5 teams from Primera B Metropolitana; 4 teams from Primera C Metropolitana and 2 teams from Primera D Metropolitana), 15 teams from Primera Nacional and 28 teams from Primera División. The round was played between 25 January and 15 May 2024, in a single knock-out match format. The 32 winning teams advanced to the Round of 32.

23 March 2024	Boca Juniors	3–0	Central Norte	Santiago del Estero, Pcia. de Santiago del Estero
20:30	Cavani 17', 56'; Merentiel 74'	Report		Stadium: Único Madre de Ciudades; Referee: Facundo Tello

7 February 2024	River Plate	3–0	Excursionistas	Santa Fe, Pcia. de Santa Fe
21:45	Borja 49'; Mastantuono 68'; Ruberto 90+3'	Report		Stadium: Brigadier General Estanislao López; Referee: Hernán Mastrángelo

21 March 2024	Racing	3–0	San Martín (B)	La Plata, Pcia. de Buenos Aires
20:15	A. Martínez 57'; Carbonero 67'; Salas 83'	Report		Stadium: Juan Carmelo Zerillo; Referee: Fernando Rapallini

22 March 2024	Independiente	3–0	Laferrere	Lanús, Pcia. de Buenos Aires
17:15	Luna 41'; Mancuello 63' (pen.); Quiñónez 76' (pen.)	Report		Stadium: Ciudad de Lanús – Néstor Díaz Pérez; Referee: Hernán Mastrángelo

28 February 2024	San Lorenzo	1–0	Independiente (Ch)	Quilmes, Pcia. de Buenos Aires
21:10	Tarragona 59'	Report		Stadium: Centenario Ciudad de Quilmes; Referee: Daniel Zamora

3 April 2024	Huracán	0–0 (4–2 p)	Villa Mitre	Quilmes, Pcia. de Buenos Aires
21:10		Report		Stadium: Centenario Ciudad de Quilmes; Referee: Fernando Echenique
	Penalties
	Pussetto (penalty scored); Soñora (penalty scored); Pereyra (penalty scored); Echeverría (penalty scored)		(penalty scored) Manchafico; (penalty missed) González Gatica; (penalty scored) Mancinelli; (penalty missed) Vivani

25 January 2024	Estudiantes (LP)	3–0	Argentino (MM)	Lanús, Pcia. de Buenos Aires
19:45	Correa 19'; Méndez 40', 87' (pen.)	Report		Stadium: Ciudad de Lanús – Néstor Díaz Pérez; Referee: Sebastián Martínez

6 February 2024	Gimnasia y Esgrima (LP)	2–1	Centro Español	Quilmes, Pcia. de Buenos Aires
20:00	Mammini 13'; Sánchez 17'	Report	Ledesma 28' (o.g.)	Stadium: Centenario Ciudad de Quilmes; Referee: Yamil Possi

14 March 2024	Rosario Central	1–1 (4–3 p)	Douglas Haig	Santa Fe, Pcia. de Santa Fe
19:45	Cervera 17'	Report	Olego 39'	Stadium: 15 de Abril; Referee: Fernando Echenique
	Penalties
	Malcorra (penalty scored); M. Martínez (penalty scored); Komar (penalty missed); Sández (penalty scored); Hernández (penalty missed); Lo Celso (penalty scored)		(penalty scored) Ibarra; (penalty missed) Díaz; (penalty missed) Sandona; (penalty scored) Cuello; (penalty scored) Olego; (penalty missed) Stancato

22 March 2024	Newell's Old Boys	2–0	Midland	Santa Fe, Pcia. de Santa Fe
15:00	E. Fernández 59', 82'	Report		Stadium: Brigadier General Estanislao López; Referee: Luis Lobo Medina

15 March 2024	Argentinos Juniors	2–1	Gimnasia y Tiro	Caseros, Pcia. de Buenos Aires
19:15	Viveros 18'; Perelló 82'	Report	Busse 38'	Stadium: Ciudad de Caseros; Referee: Andrés Gariano

21 February 2024	Vélez Sarsfield	2–1	Sportivo Las Parejas	Florida, Pcia. de Buenos Aires
21:10	Osorio 32'; Aquino 88'	Report	Guidara 69' (o.g.)	Stadium: Ciudad de Vicente López; Referee: Fernando Espinoza

15 March 2024	Lanús	0–1	El Porvenir	Florencio Varela, Pcia. de Buenos Aires
17:00		Report	Quinteros 17'	Stadium: Norberto "Tito" Tomaghello; Referee: Brian Ferreyra

9 April 2024	Banfield	6–0	Ciudad de Bolivar	Florida, Pcia. de Buenos Aires
18:30	Maciel 11'; Sepúlveda 20'; González 41', 59'; Giménez 69', 83'	Report		Stadium: Ciudad de Vicente López; Referee: Fabricio Llobet

17 April 2024	Unión	1–2	Gimnasia y Esgrima (M)	Junín, Pcia. de Buenos Aires
21:15	B. Pittón 28'	Report	Silba 17'; Solís 88'	Stadium: Eva Perón; Referee: Pablo Echavarría

8 May 2024	Colón	2–1	Los Andes	Junín, Pcia. de Buenos Aires
18:05	Fernández Colombo 61' (o.g.); Lago 72'	Report	Páez 75'	Stadium: Eva Perón; Referee: Fernando Echenique

14 March 2024	Talleres (C)	3–0	Agropecuario Argentino	Quilmes, Pcia. de Buenos Aires
17:30	M. Portillo 38'; Bustos 81'; Martínez 90+2'	Report		Stadium: Centenario Ciudad de Quilmes; Referee: Nicolás Lamolina

7 February 2024	Belgrano	1–2	Mitre (SdE)	Junín, Pcia. de Buenos Aires
19:15	Barinaga 68'	Report	Romero 45+4' (pen.); Posse 60'	Stadium: Eva Perón; Referee: Andrés Gariano

27 March 2024	Independiente Rivadavia	1–0	Argentino (Q)	La Punta, Pcia. de San Luis
17:45	Petrasso 84'	Report		Stadium: Provincial Juan Gilberto Funes; Referee: Lucas Comesaña

25 March 2024	Godoy Cruz	0–0 (4–3 p)	San Martín (SJ)	La Punta, Pcia. de San Luis
17:15		Report		Stadium: Provincial Juan Gilberto Funes; Referee: Darío Herrera
	Penalties
	Conechny (penalty scored); Poggi (penalty scored); Cejas (penalty scored); Barrios (penalty scored); Arce (penalty missed)		(penalty scored) F. González; (penalty scored) Zacaría; (penalty scored) Olguín; (penalty missed) Cáseres; (penalty missed) Casa

8 May 2024	Arsenal	1–0	Estudiantes (RC)	Quilmes, Pcia. de Buenos Aires
15:05	Domingo 43' (pen.)	Report		Stadium: Centenario Ciudad de Quilmes; Referee: Julio Barraza

21 March 2024	Defensa y Justicia	1–2	Atlético de Rafaela	Junín, Pcia. de Buenos Aires
17:45	Togni 35'	Report	Portillo 8'; Vidal 18'	Stadium: Eva Perón; Referee: Juan Pafundi

7 February 2024	Deportivo Riestra	1–0	Comunicaciones	Turdera, Pcia. de Buenos Aires
17:00	Benegas 90+15' (pen.)	Report		Stadium: Alfredo Beranger; Referee: Joaquín Gil

10 April 2024	Barracas Central	0–0 (4–2 p)	San Miguel	Turdera, Pcia. de Buenos Aires
17:00		Report		Stadium: Alfredo Beranger; Referee: Andrés Gariano
	Penalties
	Mater (penalty scored); Zalazar (penalty scored); Candia (penalty scored); Arce (penalty scored)		(penalty scored) Rojas; (penalty scored) Kippes; (penalty missed) Melivilo; (penalty missed) Ferrero

20 March 2024	Atlético Tucumán	4–0	Defensores de Belgrano	Santa Fe, Pcia. de Santa Fe
21:10	Bajamich 50'; Estigarribia 84'; Castro Ponce 90', 90+2'	Report		Stadium: 15 de Abril; Referee: Pablo Dóvalo

2 April 2024	Central Córdoba (SdE)	3–1	Quilmes	Turdera, Pcia. de Buenos Aires
16:00	Sanabria 34'; Kalinski 36'; Atencio 41'	Report	Parisi 50'	Stadium: Alfredo Beranger; Referee: Andrés Gariano

25 March 2024	Platense	0–0 (4–2 p)	Olimpo	Caseros, Pcia. de Buenos Aires
19:30		Report		Stadium: Ciudad de Caseros; Referee: Leandro Rey Hilfer
	Penalties
	Pellegrino (penalty scored); Suso (penalty scored); Marcich (penalty missed); Hachen (penalty scored); Vázquez (penalty scored)		(penalty missed) Osurak; (penalty scored) Affranchino; (penalty missed) Hadad; (penalty scored) Osinaga

21 February 2024^{a}	Tigre	1–1 (4–5 p)	Chacarita Juniors	Sarandí, Pcia. de Buenos Aires
17:10	Alemán 50'	Report	Salinas 52'	Stadium: Julio Humberto Grondona; Referee: Ariel Penel
	Penalties
	Ortega (penalty scored); Nardelli (penalty scored); Alemán (penalty scored); Sánchez Miño (penalty missed); Garay (penalty scored)		(penalty scored) Pisano; (penalty scored) Pombo; (penalty scored) Salinas; (penalty scored) Rodríguez; (penalty scored) Brandán

18 April 2024	Deportivo Maipú	1–1 (7–8 p)	Juventud Unida Universitario	Córdoba, Pcia. de Córdoba
16:00	Rasic 68'	Report	T. Garro 81'	Stadium: El Gigante de Alberdi; Referee: Gastón Monsón Brizuela
	Penalties
	Ostachuk (penalty missed); Moyano (penalty scored); Viguet (penalty scored); Ortega (penalty scored); Ramírez (penalty scored); Rasic (penalty scored); Coronel (penalty scored); Lioi (penalty scored); Mansilla (penalty missed)		(penalty missed) De Hoyos; (penalty scored) Persia; (penalty scored) Riera; (penalty scored) M. Gómez; (penalty scored) T. Garro; (penalty scored) Tello; (penalty scored) J. Gómez; (penalty scored) Ojeda; (penalty scored) E. Garro

3 April 2024	Instituto	1–2	Talleres (RdE)	Rafaela, Pcia. de Santa Fe
19:00	Bay 3'	Report	Enrique 61' (pen.); Monserrat 69'	Stadium: Nuevo Monumental; Referee: Leandro Rey Hilfer

27 February 2024	Sarmiento (J)	1–1 (3–4 p)	Temperley	Caseros, Pcia. de Buenos Aires
17:10	Paredes 41'	Report	Sánchez 68'	Stadium: Ciudad de Caseros; Referee: Nazareno Arasa
	Penalties
	Ferreyra (penalty missed); Quiroz (penalty scored); Amarilla (penalty missed); Díaz (penalty scored); Mónaco (penalty scored)		(penalty missed) Da Campo; (penalty scored) Krüger; (penalty scored) Frías; (penalty scored) Angelini; (penalty scored) Arturia

15 May 2024	Almirante Brown	3–3 (3–1 p)	San Martín (T)	Santa Fe, Pcia. de Santa Fe
17:15	Almada 4'; Gauna 25'; Díaz 37'	Report	Banegas 56', 80'; Klusener 90+4'	Stadium: Brigadier General Estanislao López; Referee: Andrés Gariano
	Penalties
	Vera (penalty scored); Iglesias (penalty missed); Gauna (penalty scored); Stable (penalty missed); Miño (penalty scored)		(penalty scored) Klusener; (penalty missed) Arias; (penalty missed) Hernández; (penalty missed) Moreno

Notes

a. Referee Ariel Penel suspended the match in the 51st minute after Fernando Brandán (Chacarita Juniors) was hit on the head by a bottle thrown from the stands. On 7 March 2024, the AFA Disciplinary Court decided to resume the match and play the remaining 39 minutes on a date to be determined in Sarandí behind closed doors. Tigre had to pay Chacarita Juniors' travel expenses and a fine. The match was resumed on 17 April 2024 at 15:40.

=== Round of 32 ===
This round had 32 qualified teams from the Round of 64. The round was played between 2 May and 17 July 2024, in a single knock-out match format. The 16 winning teams advanced to the Round of 16.

19 June 2024	Boca Juniors	2–1	Almirante Brown	Mendoza, Pcia. de Mendoza
21:10	Merentiel 45+2'; Cavani 52'	Report	Vera 77'	Stadium: Malvinas Argentinas; Referee: Pablo Echavarría

6 June 2024	Talleres (C)	1–0	Colón	Rosario, Pcia. de Santa Fe
21:10	Girotti 45+3'	Report		Stadium: Marcelo Bielsa; Referee: Nicolás Ramírez

8 July 2024	Rosario Central	0–1	Barracas Central	Florida, Pcia. de Buenos Aires
16:00		Report	Candia 45+2'	Stadium: Ciudad de Vicente López; Referee: Pablo Dóvalo

22 May 2024	Atlético Tucumán	1–2	Gimnasia y Esgrima (LP)	Santa Fe, Pcia. de Santa Fe
21:10	Estigarribia 84' (pen.)	Report	De Blasis 73' (pen.); Colazo 90'	Stadium: Brigadier General Estanislao López; Referee: Jorge Baliño

7 June 2024	San Lorenzo	2–0	Chacarita Juniors	Santa Fe, Pcia. de Santa Fe
20:00	Leguizamón 7', 23'	Report		Stadium: Brigadier General Estanislao López; Referee: Leandro Rey Hilfer

5 June 2024	Arsenal	1–2	Vélez Sarsfield	Quilmes, Pcia. de Buenos Aires
21:15	D. Fernández 88' (o.g.)	Report	Pizzini 47'; T. Fernández 79'	Stadium: Centenario Ciudad de Quilmes; Referee: Andrés Gariano

29 May 2024	El Porvenir	0–4	Godoy Cruz	Córdoba, Pcia. de Córdoba
15:30		Report	Pino 5'; Badaloni 50'; Fernández 81'; Ulariaga 84'	Stadium: El Gigante de Alberdi; Referee: Nicolás Lamolina

3 May 2024	Juventud Unida Universitario	0–2	Independiente	Lanús, Pcia. de Buenos Aires
21:30		Report	Canelo 60'; Luna 88'	Stadium: Ciudad de Lanús – Néstor Díaz Pérez; Referee: Fernando Rapallini

2 May 2024	Racing	1–2	Talleres (RdE)	Quilmes, Pcia. de Buenos Aires
21:10	Salas 66'	Report	Duré 6'; Guzmán 90+3'	Stadium: Centenario Ciudad de Quilmes; Referee: Pablo Echavarría

30 May 2024	Independiente Rivadavia	1–2	Banfield	Córdoba, Pcia. de Córdoba
15:30	Ramis 70'	Report	Sepúlveda 39'; Giménez 51'	Stadium: Mario Alberto Kempes; Referee: Pablo Echavarría

5 June 2024	Argentinos Juniors	1–0	Atlético de Rafaela	San Nicolás de los Arroyos, Pcia. de Buenos Aires
19:00	Gondou 90'	Report		Stadium: Único de San Nicolás; Referee: Juan Pafundi

8 June 2024	Platense	0–0 (4–5 p)	Huracán	Quilmes, Pcia. de Buenos Aires
17:20		Report		Stadium: Centenario Ciudad de Quilmes; Referee: Yael Falcón Pérez
	Penalties
	Vázquez (penalty scored); Saborido (penalty scored); Marcich (penalty scored); Rivero (penalty scored); Russo (penalty missed); Angulo (penalty missed)		(penalty missed) Pussetto; (penalty scored) Carrizo; (penalty scored) Soñora; (penalty scored) Alarcón; (penalty scored) Garate; (penalty scored) Alfonso

17 July 2024	Estudiantes (LP)	1–2	Central Córdoba (SdE)	Córdoba, Pcia. de Córdoba
18:00	Piatti 62'	Report	Atencio 13', 50'	Stadium: El Gigante de Alberdi; Referee: Andrés Gariano

16 May 2024	Deportivo Riestra	0–1	Newell's Old Boys	Paraná, Pcia. de Entre Ríos
17:10		Report	May 23'	Stadium: Presbítero Bartolomé Grella; Referee: Ariel Penel

15 May 2024	Gimnasia y Esgrima (M)	0–1	Mitre (SdE)	Caseros, Pcia. de Buenos Aires
15:00		Report	Triverio 90+2'	Stadium: Ciudad de Caseros; Referee: Lucas Cavallero

21 May 2024	Temperley	1–1 (5–4 p)	River Plate	Mendoza, Pcia. de Mendoza
21:10	Martínez 90+1'	Report	Barco 50'	Stadium: Malvinas Argentinas; Referee: Sebastián Zunino
	Penalties
	Ilarregui (penalty scored); Souto (penalty scored); Scolari (penalty scored); Ibáñez (penalty missed); López (penalty scored); Segovia (penalty scored)		(penalty scored) Colidio; (penalty missed) Barco; (penalty scored) Simón; (penalty scored) Fonseca; (penalty scored) Sant'Anna; (penalty missed) Martínez

=== Round of 16 ===
This round had 16 qualified teams from the Round of 32. The round was played between 31 July and 7 September 2024, in a single knock-out match format. The 8 winning teams advanced to the quarterfinals.

7 September 2024	Boca Juniors	1–1 (8–7 p)	Talleres (C)	Mendoza, Pcia. de Mendoza
20:00	Aguirre 15'	Report	Girotti 19'	Stadium: Malvinas Argentinas; Referee: Andrés Merlos
	Penalties
	Zeballos (penalty scored); Giménez (penalty scored); Zenón (penalty scored); Lema (penalty scored); Fernández (penalty missed); Blanco (penalty scored); Saralegui (penalty scored); Medina (penalty missed); Anselmino (penalty missed); Barinaga (penalty scored); Brey (penalty scored)		(penalty scored) Tarragona; (penalty scored) Ortegoza; (penalty missed) Martínez; (penalty scored) J. Portillo; (penalty scored) Benavídez; (penalty scored) M. A. Galarza; (penalty scored) Suárez; (penalty missed) Mantilla; (penalty missed) Moyano; (penalty scored) Ruiz Rodríguez; (penalty missed) Herrera

22 August 2024	Barracas Central	0–1	Gimnasia y Esgrima (LP)	Lanús, Pcia. de Buenos Aires
17:00		Report	Domínguez 53'	Stadium: Ciudad de Lanús – Néstor Díaz Pérez; Referee: Darío Herrera

6 August 2024	San Lorenzo	1–3	Vélez Sarsfield	Avellaneda, Pcia. de Buenos Aires
21:10	Cuello 61'	Report	Ordóñez 10'; Romero 82'; Carrizo 90+2'	Stadium: Libertadores de América; Referee: Fernando Rapallini

28 August 2024	Godoy Cruz	0–3	Independiente	Córdoba, Pcia. de Córdoba
21:10		Report	Montiel 56'; López 73'; Tarzia 88'	Stadium: Mario Alberto Kempes; Referee: Pablo Echavarría

15 August 2024	Talleres (RdE)	1–1 (4–3 p)	Banfield	Quilmes, Pcia. de Buenos Aires
17:00	Duré 43'	Report	Y. Rodríguez 22'	Stadium: Centenario Ciudad de Quilmes; Referee: Fernando Echenique
	Penalties
	Enrique (penalty scored); Achucarro (penalty missed); Duré (penalty scored); Pulicastro (penalty missed); Molina (penalty scored); Denis (penalty scored)		(penalty missed) Bisanz; (penalty scored) De Ritis; (penalty missed) Echeverría; (penalty scored) Galván; (penalty scored) Cañete; (penalty missed) Bonifacio

14 August 2024	Argentinos Juniors	1–1 (4–5 p)	Huracán	Avellaneda, Pcia. de Buenos Aires
19:00	A. Rodríguez 90+2'	Report	Ábila 53'	Stadium: Libertadores de América; Referee: Nazareno Arasa
	Penalties
	D. Rodríguez (penalty scored); Verón (penalty scored); Molina (penalty missed); Prieto (penalty scored); Galván (penalty scored); Herrera (penalty missed)		(penalty missed) Carrizo; (penalty scored) Fattori; (penalty scored) Echeverría; (penalty scored) Alarcón; (penalty scored) Pereyra; (penalty scored) Tobio

21 August 2024	Central Córdoba (SdE)	0–0 (3–2 p)	Newell's Old Boys	San Nicolás de los Arroyos, Pcia. de Buenos Aires
19:00		Report		Stadium: Único de San Nicolás; Referee: Jorge Baliño
	Penalties
	Vázquez (penalty scored); Meli (penalty scored); Varaldo (penalty missed); Atencio (penalty missed); Abascia (penalty scored)		(penalty missed) Carabajal; (penalty scored) Pérez; (penalty scored) Salcedo; (penalty missed) Velázquez; (penalty missed) Miljevic

31 July 2024	Mitre (SdE)	0–0 (2–3 p)	Temperley	San Nicolás de los Arroyos, Pcia. de Buenos Aires
21:10		Report		Stadium: Único de San Nicolás; Referee: Silvio Trucco
	Penalties
	Romero (penalty missed); Posse (penalty missed); Isa Luna (penalty scored); Piris (penalty scored); G. Díaz (penalty missed)		(penalty scored) Ilarregui; (penalty missed) Souto; (penalty missed) Frías; (penalty scored) Ayunta; (penalty scored) Arturia

=== Quarterfinals ===
This round had 8 qualified teams from the Round of 36. The round was played between 18 September and 23 October 2024, in a single knock-out match format. The 4 winning teams advanced to the semifinals.

23 October 2024	Boca Juniors	1–1 (2–1 p)	Gimnasia y Esgrima (LP)	Rosario, Pcia. de Santa Fe
21:10	Anselmino 8'	Report	De Blasis 65'	Stadium: Marcelo Bielsa; Referee: Jorge Baliño
	Penalties
	Rojo (penalty scored); Merentiel (penalty missed); Figal (penalty scored); Giménez (penalty missed)		(penalty scored) De Blasis; (penalty missed) Castillo; (penalty missed) Troyansky; (penalty missed) Morales; (penalty missed) Zalazar

27 September 2024	Vélez Sarsfield	1–0	Independiente	Lanús, Pcia. de Buenos Aires
18:00	Aquino 54'	Report		Stadium: Ciudad de Lanús – Néstor Díaz Pérez; Referee: Fernando Rapallini

19 September 2024	Talleres (RdE)	0–1	Huracán	Avellaneda, Pcia. de Buenos Aires
19:00		Report	Ramírez 32'	Stadium: Libertadores de América; Referee: Pablo Dóvalo

18 September 2024	Central Córdoba (SdE)	2–1	Temperley	San Nicolás de los Arroyos, Pcia. de Buenos Aires
21:10	Florentín 50'; Cabral 57'	Report	Baldunciel 5'	Stadium: Único de San Nicolás; Referee: Nazareno Arasa

=== Semifinals ===
This round had 4 qualified teams from the quarterfinals. The round was played between 24 October and 27 November 2024, in a single knock-out match format. The 2 winning teams advanced to the final.

27 November 2024	Boca Juniors	3–4	Vélez Sarsfield	Córdoba, Pcia. de Córdoba
21:10	Cavani 44'; Zeballos 70'; Belmonte 80'	Report	Pizzini 7'; Figal 20' (o.g.); Bouzat 84', 89'	Stadium: Mario Alberto Kempes; Referee: Pablo Echavarría

24 October 2024	Huracán	1–2	Central Córdoba (SdE)	San Nicolás de los Arroyos, Pcia. de Buenos Aires
19:00	De la Fuente 7'	Report	Atencio 18'; Florentín 37'	Stadium: Único de San Nicolás; Referee: Silvio Trucco

=== Final ===
11 December 2024
21:10

Vélez Sarsfield	0–1	Central Córdoba (SdE)
	Report	Godoy 53'

15 de Abril, Santa Fe
Referee: Yael Falcón Pérez

== Top goalscorers ==
Rank	Player	Club	Goals
1	(Argentina) Rodrigo Atencio	Central Córdoba (SdE)	4
1	(Uruguay) Edinson Cavani	Boca Juniors	4
3	(Argentina) Milton Giménez	Banfield	3
4	(Argentina) Claudio Aquino	Vélez Sarsfield	2
4	(Argentina) Nahuel Banegas	San Martín (T)	2
4	(Argentina) Agustín Bouzat	Vélez Sarsfield	2
4	(Argentina) Tomás Castro Ponce	Atlético Tucumán	2
4	(Argentina) Pablo de Blasis	Gimnasia y Esgrima (LP)	2
4	(Argentina) Fernando Duré	Talleres (RdE)	2
4	(Argentina) Marcelo Estigarribia	Atlético Tucumán	2
4	(Argentina) Esteban Fernández	Newell's Old Boys	2
4	(Paraguay) José Florentín	Central Córdoba (SdE)	2
4	(Argentina) Federico Girotti	Talleres (C)	2
4	(Argentina) Matías González	Banfield	2
4	(Paraguay) Iván Leguizamón	San Lorenzo	2
4	(Argentina) Alex Luna	Independiente	2
4	(Uruguay) Mauro Méndez	Estudiantes (LP)	2
4	(Uruguay) Miguel Merentiel	Boca Juniors	2
4	(Argentina) Francisco Pizzini	Vélez Sarsfield	2
4	(Argentina) Maximiliano Salas	Racing	2
4	(Argentina) Bruno Sepúlveda	Banfield	2

Source: Copa Argentina

== Team of the tournament ==
Team
Goalkeeper	Defenders	Midfielders	Forwards
Juan Francisco Rago (Temperley)	Fernando Duré (Talleres (RdE)); Lucas Abascia (Quilmes/Central Córdoba (SdE)); Valentín Gómez (Vélez Sarsfield)	José Florentín (Vélez Sarsfield/Central Córdoba (SdE)); Agustín Bouzat (Vélez Sarsfield); Rodrigo Atencio (Central Córdoba (SdE)); Claudio Aquino (Vélez Sarsfield)	Francisco Pizzini (Vélez Sarsfield); Edinson Cavani (Boca Juniors); Matías Godoy (Central Córdoba (SdE))
Substitutes
Luis Ingolotti (Central Córdoba (SdE)); Leandro Brey (Boca Juniors)	Sebastián Valdez (Central Córdoba (SdE)); Fabio Pereyra (Huracán); Fernando Martínez (Temperley/Central Córdoba (SdE))	Williams Alarcón (Huracán); Fernando Enrique (Talleres (RdE)); Kevin Vázquez (Central Córdoba (SdE)); Pablo de Blasis (Gimnasia y Esgrima (LP)); Alex Luna (Independiente)	Federico Girotti (Talleres (C)); Milton Giménez (Banfield/Boca Juniors)
Coach
Omar De Felippe (Central Córdoba (SdE))

Source: Copa Argentina

== See also ==
- 2024 Argentine Primera División
- 2024 Copa de la Liga Profesional
