= Elías Cabrera =

Argentine footballer

Personal information
- Full name: Elías Lautaro Cabrera
- Date of birth: 25 February 2003 (age 23)
- Place of birth: Merlo, Buenos Aires, Argentina
- Height: 1.72 m (5 ft 8 in)
- Position: Midfielder

Team information
- Current team: Atlético Nacional (on loan from Vélez Sarsfield)
- Number: 22

Youth career
- 2010–2022: Vélez Sarsfield

Senior career*
Years	Team	Apps	(Gls)
2022–	Vélez Sarsfield	27	(1)
2024	→ Central Córdoba SdE (loan)	20	(0)
2025–2026	→ Tigre (loan)	43	(2)
2026–	→ Atlético Nacional (loan)	5	(1)

International career
2019	Argentina U16	6	(2)
2022	Argentina U20	1	(0)
- * Club domestic league appearances and goals as of 16:55, 5 October 2026 (UTC)

Elías Lautaro Cabrera (born 25 February 2003) is an Argentine professional footballer who plays as a midfielder for Atlético Nacional, on loan from Vélez Sarsfield.

== Career ==
=== Vélez Sarsfield ===
Cabrera came through the youth setup at Vélez Sarsfield, signing his first contract in 2019, which he extended for 3 years in 2021. On 26 October 2022, he made his debut in a 3–1 win against Central Córdoba SdE. On 7 June 2023, he scored in a 5–1 win against Deportivo Español in the Copa Argentina.

==== Loan to Central Córdoba SdE ====
On 5 July 2024, he was loaned to Central Córdoba SdE. He was part of the squad that won the Copa Argentina in 2024, being an unused substitute in the final.

==== Loan to Tigre ====
On 20 January 2025, he was loaned to Tigre. He scored his first goal for the club on 26 September in a 1–0 win against his former club, Central Córdoba. On 9 November, he again scored the winner in a 1–0 victory, this time against Estudiantes. On 15 January 2026, his loan was extended for another season, with an option to buy.

== Career statistics ==
As of 5 March 2026

Appearances and goals by club, season and competition
Club	Season	League			Cup (Note: Includes Copa Argentina)		Continental		Other		Total	
Club	Season	Division	Goals	Apps	Apps	Goals	Apps	Goals	Apps	Goals	Apps	Goals
Vélez Sarsfield	2022	Liga Profesional	1	0	0	0	—		—		1	0
Vélez Sarsfield	2023	Liga Profesional	24	1	2	1	—		—		26	2
Vélez Sarsfield	2024	Liga Profesional	2	0	0	0	—		—		2	0
Vélez Sarsfield	Total		27	1	2	1	0	0	0	0	29	2
Central Córdoba SdE (loan)	2024	Liga Profesional	20	0	3	0	—		—		23	0
Tigre (loan)	2025	Liga Profesional	30	2	3	0	—		—		33	2
Tigre (loan)	2026	Liga Profesional	4	0	1	0	—		—		5	0
Tigre (loan)	Total		34	2	4	0	0	0	0	0	38	2
Career total			81	3	9	1	0	0	0	0	90	4

== Honours ==
Central Córdoba SdE

- Copa Argentina: 2024
