= Jano (disambiguation) =

Jano is municipality of Honduras.

Jano may also refer to:

== Places ==
- Pico Jano, mountain of Spain

== People ==
- Jano (footballer, born 1980), Spanish footballer
- Jano (footballer, born 1986), Spanish footballer
- Avishai Jano (born 1970), Israeli footballer
- Vittorio Jano (1891–1965), Italian automobile designer
- Jean Leguay (artist) alias Jano (born 1955), French artist
- Jano Gordon (born 2004), Argentine footballer
- Jano ter Horst (born 2002), German footballer
- Jano Köhler (1873–1941), Czech painter
