= Luis Ingolotti =

Argentine footballer (born 2000)

Personal information
- Full name: Luis Ignacio Ingolotti
- Date of birth: 14 January 2000 (age 26)
- Place of birth: Pilar, Argentina
- Height: 1.84 m (6 ft 0 in)
- Position: Goalkeeper

Team information
- Current team: Atlético Tucumán
- Number: 1

Youth career
- Sportivo Pilar
- Vélez Sarsfield
- Platense
- 2015–2017: Aldosivi

Senior career*
Years	Team	Apps	(Gls)
2017–2024	Aldosivi	18	(0)
2024–2025	Central Córdoba SdE	34	(0)
2025–2026	Gimnasia LP	3	(0)
2026–	Atlético Tucumán	32	(0)

International career
- Argentina U17
- Argentina U20
- * Club domestic league appearances and goals as of 17:28, 9 November 2026 (UTC)

Luis Ignacio Ingolotti (born 14 January 2000) is an Argentine professional footballer who plays as a goalkeeper for Atlético Tucumán.

== Club career ==
Ingolotti started with Sportivo Pilar, before having stints with Vélez Sarsfield and Platense. In 2015, Ingolotti joined Aldosivi. He made the first-team's substitute's bench in November 2017 for a Primera B Nacional draw away to Guillermo Brown; in a campaign that ended with promotion to the top-flight. He was an unused sub a further eight times across the next three years. Ingolotti's senior debut came on 14 January 2021, his 21st birthday, as he played the full duration of a 4–4 draw away to Defensa y Justicia in the Copa de la Liga Profesional; goalkeepers ahead of him, Luciano Pocrnjic and Fabián Assmann, were unavailable.

== International career ==
Ingolotti received call-ups from Argentina at U17 and U20 level; for the latter, he was selected in Fernando Batista's preliminary squad for the 2020 CONMEBOL Pre-Olympic Tournament in Colombia, though didn't make the final cut.

== Style of play ==
Up until the age of seven or eight, Ingolotti played as a forward. One day, with a goalkeeper missing for a match, he was selected to go in goal by virtue of being the tallest player - he would remain in that position.

== Personal life ==
On 2 January 2021, it was confirmed that Ingolotti had tested asymptomatically positive for COVID-19; amid the global pandemic.

== Career statistics ==
As of 17 January 2021

Appearances and goals by club, season and competition
Club	Season	League			National cup		League cup		Continental		Other		Total	
Club	Season	Division	Apps	Goals	Apps	Goals	Apps	Goals	Apps	Goals	Apps	Goals	Apps	Goals
Aldosivi	2017–18	Argentine Primera División	0	0	0	0	—		—		0	0	0	0
Aldosivi	2018–19	Argentine Primera División	0	0	0	0	0	0	—		0	0	0	0
Aldosivi	2019–20	Argentine Primera División	0	0	0	0	0	0	—		0	0	0	0
Aldosivi	2020–21 (Note: Soccerway counts Copa de la Liga Profesional appearances as league appearances.)	Argentine Primera División	1	0	0	0	0	0	—		0	0	1	0
Career total			1	0	0	0	0	0	0	0	0	0	1	0

== Honours ==
Central Córdoba (SdE)

- Copa Argentina: 2024
