= Sebastián Valdez =

Argentine footballer (born 1995)

Personal information
- Full name: Sebastián Anibal Váldez
- Date of birth: 6 November 1995 (age 31)
- Place of birth: Buenos Aires, Argentina
- Position: Centre-back

Team information
- Current team: Independiente
- Number: 36

Youth career
- Los Andes

Senior career*
Years	Team	Apps	(Gls)
2016–2020	Los Andes	72	(2)
2020–2023	Almagro	59	(0)
2023–2025	Central Córdoba SdE	50	(0)
2025–	Independiente	43	(0)
- * Club domestic league appearances and goals as of 17:54, 6 June 2026 (UTC)

Sebastián Anibal Váldez (born 6 November 1995) is an Argentine professional footballer who plays as a centre-back for Independiente.

== Career ==
Valdez began with Los Andes. Marcelo Barrera was the manager who selected Valdez for his senior debut, picking him to start a 3–3 draw with Villa Dálmine on 2 June 2016. Thirty further appearances subsequently arrived for the Primera B Nacional club across his next two seasons.

== Career statistics ==
As of 14 February 2019.

Appearances and goals by club, season and competition
Club	Season	League			Cup		Continental		Other		Total	
Club	Season	Division	Apps	Goals	Apps	Goals	Apps	Goals	Apps	Goals	Apps	Goals
Los Andes	2016	Primera B Nacional	1	0	0	0	—		0	0	1	0
Los Andes	2016–17	Primera B Nacional	12	0	0	0	—		0	0	12	0
Los Andes	2017–18	Primera B Nacional	18	0	0	0	—		0	0	18	0
Los Andes	2018–19	Primera B Nacional	11	0	0	0	—		0	0	11	0
Career total			42	0	0	0	—		0	0	42	0

== Honours ==
Central Córdoba (SdE)

- Copa Argentina: 2024
