= Luis Angulo =

Colombian footballer (born 2004)

Personal information
- Full name: Luis Miguel Angulo Sevillano
- Date of birth: 23 March 2004 (age 22)
- Place of birth: Magüí Payán, Colombia
- Height: 1.74 m (5 ft 9 in)
- Position: Forward

Team information
- Current team: Peñarol (on loan from Talleres de Córdoba)
- Number: 77

Youth career
- 2014: K10
- 2014–2020: Distrito
- 2021: Alianza Petrolera

Senior career*
Years	Team	Apps	(Gls)
2021–2023	Alianza Petrolera	56	(5)
2023–	Talleres de Córdoba	17	(0)
2024	→ Platense (loan)	5	(0)
2024–2025	→ Central Córdoba SdE (loan)	33	(4)
2026–	→ Peñarol (loan)	5	(1)

International career^{‡}
- Colombia U15
2021	Colombia U17		
2022	Colombia U19	5	(0)
2021–	Colombia U20	4	(0)
- * Club domestic league appearances and goals as of 18:46, 17 March 2026 (UTC) ‡ National team caps and goals as of 16:53, 21 June 2023 (UTC)

Luis Miguel Angulo Sevillano (born 23 March 2004) is a Colombian footballer who currently plays as a forward for Peñarol, on loan from Talleres de Córdoba.

== Club career ==
Born in Magüí Payán, Angulo moved to Cali at the age of ten. He initially joined an academy named K10, before spending seven years at another academy - Distrito FC. He joined professional side Alianza Petrolera in early 2021, and was fast-tracked through their academy system into the first-team at the age of seventeen.

Having made his first-team debut shortly after joining, in April 2021, Angulo spent the next two seasons establishing himself in the first team, notably scoring twice against Atlético Nacional on two separate occasions in May 2023.

On 1 August 2023, Angulo signed for Argentine Primera División club Talleres de Córdoba on a contract until 2027.

In March 2024, Angulo joined Platense on loan until December.

On 24 June 2024, Angulo joined Central Córdoba SdE on loan.

== International career ==
Angulo has represented Colombia from under-15 to under-20 level. He was initially called up to the under-20 preliminary squad for the 2023 FIFA U-20 World Cup, but was not selected for the final squad by coach Héctor Cárdenas.

== Career statistics ==
=== Club ===
As of 18 March 2024

Appearances and goals by club, season and competition
Club	Season	League			Cup		Other		Total	
Club	Season	Division	Apps	Goals	Apps	Goals	Apps	Goals	Apps	Goals
Alianza Petrolera	2021	Categoría Primera A	8	1	4 (Note: Appearances in the Copa Colombia)	0	0	0	12	1
Alianza Petrolera	2022	Categoría Primera A	27	1	0	0	0	0	27	1
Alianza Petrolera	2023	Categoría Primera A	21	3	0	0	0	0	21	3
Alianza Petrolera	Total		56	5	4	0	0	0	60	5
Talleres de Córdoba	2023	Argentine Primera División	3	0	1	0	0	0	4	0
Talleres de Córdoba	2024	Argentine Primera División	1	0	0	0	0	0	1	0
Talleres de Córdoba	Total		4	0	1	0	0	0	5	0
Career total			56	5	4	0	0	0	60	5

== Honours ==
Central Córdoba (SdE)

- Copa Argentina: 2024
