= 2024 Supercopa Internacional =

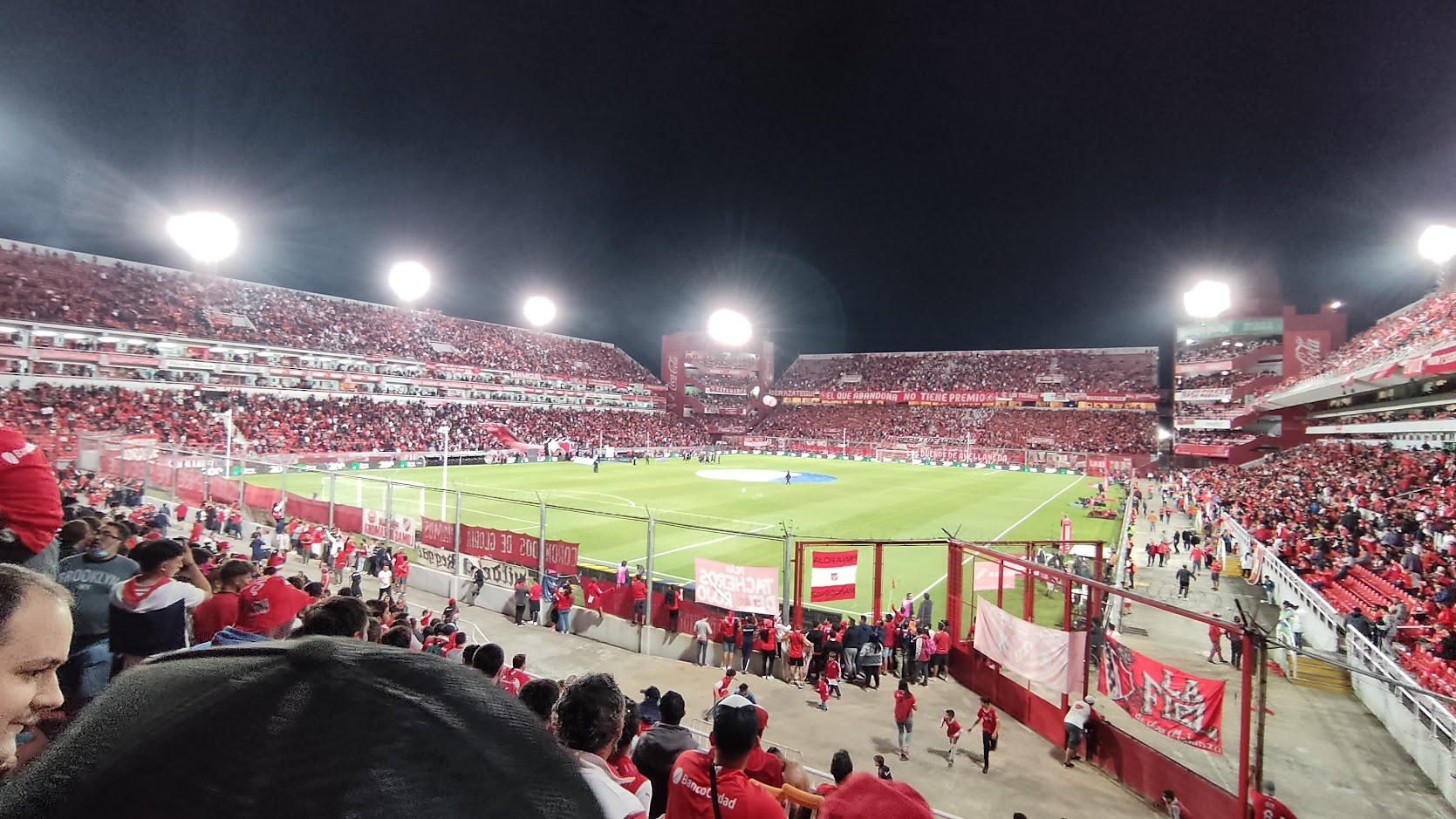
- Estadio Libertadores de América, venue
Estudiantes (LP)	Vélez Sarsfield
0	2
- Date: 8 July 2025
- Venue: Estadio Libertadores de América, Avellaneda
- Referee: Darío Herrera

The 2024 Supercopa Internacional (officially the Supercopa Internacional Sur Finanzas 2025 for sponsorship reasons) was the third edition of the Supercopa Internacional, an annual football match contested by the winners of the Trofeo de Campeones de la Liga Profesional and the best team in the Argentine Primera División aggregate table for the season.

The trophy was contested by Estudiantes (LP) (winners of 2024 Trofeo de Campeones) and Vélez Sarsfield (best team in the 2024 Primera División aggregate table). It was the third final played between both clubs within the last year, with the previous two matches being won by Estudiantes (2024 Copa de la Liga final and 2024 Trofeo de Campeones).

The Supercopa Internacional was originally scheduled to be played in Abu Dhabi, but the tournament's organizers, AFA and the Abu Dhabi Sports Council, cancelled the agreement between them and the competition has moved to another venues since then. The match was held on 8 July 2025, at the Estadio Libertadores de América in Avellaneda. Although the tournament was originally supposed to be played outside of Argentina, this was the first Supercopa Internacional played inside the country.

Vélez Sarsfield defeated Estudiantes (LP) 2–0 to win their first title.

== Qualified teams ==
- Note: **Bold** indicates winners

Team	Qualification	Previous appearances
Estudiantes (LP)	2024 Trofeo de Campeones champions	(none)
Vélez Sarsfield	2024 Primera División aggregate table best team	(none)

== Match ==
=== Details ===
2024 Supercopa Internacional
8 July 2025
20:30 UTC-3

Estudiantes (LP)	0–2	Vélez Sarsfield
	Report	Galván 52'; Romero 73'

Estadio Libertadores de América, Avellaneda
Referee: Darío Herrera

**Estudiantes (LP)**	**Vélez Sarsfield**

GK	28	(Uruguay) Fernando Muslera
DF	20	(Argentina) Eric Meza
DF	6	(Argentina) Santiago Núñez	(yellow card) 14'
DF	2	(Argentina) Facundo Rodríguez
DF	13	(Argentina) Gastón Benedetti	(yellow card) 90'
MF	5	(Argentina) Santiago Ascacíbar (c)
MF	8	(Uruguay) Gabriel Neves		(substituted off) 77'
MF	10	(Uruguay) Tiago Palacios	(yellow card) 31'
MF	25	(Argentina) Cristian Medina	(yellow card) 57'	(substituted off) 78'
MF	19	(Colombia) Alexis Manyoma		(substituted off) 70'
FW	9	(Argentina) Guido Carrillo
Substitutions:
GK	12	(Argentina) Matías Mansilla
DF	15	(Paraguay) Santiago Arzamendia
DF	26	(Argentina) Ramiro Funes Mori
DF	35	(Argentina) Valente Pierani
MF	7	(Argentina) José Sosa
MF	11	(Argentina) Facundo Farías		(substituted on) 77'
MF	21	(Argentina) Ezequiel Piovi
MF	22	(Argentina) Alexis Castro		(substituted on) 78'
FW	16	(Uruguay) Mauro Méndez
FW	18	(Colombia) Edwuin Cetré	(red card) 90+5'	(substituted on) 70'
FW	23	(Argentina) Luciano Giménez
FW	27	(Argentina) Lucas Alario
Manager:
(Argentina) Eduardo Domínguez

GK	1	(Argentina) Tomás Marchiori
DF	21	(Argentina) Jano Gordon
DF	2	(Argentina) Emanuel Mammana
DF	31	(Argentina) Valentín Gómez
DF	3	(Argentina) Elías Gómez
MF	8	(Argentina) Tomás Galván		(substituted off) 60'
MF	5	(Chile) Claudio Baeza	(yellow card) 22'	(substituted off) 86'
MF	26	(Argentina) Agustín Bouzat (c)	(yellow card) 60'
FW	39	(Malaysia) Imanol Machuca		(substituted off) 75'
FW	9	(Argentina) Braian Romero	(yellow card) 14'
FW	28	(Argentina) Maher Carrizo
Substitutions:
GK	42	(Argentina) Lautaro Garzón
DF	6	(Argentina) Aarón Quirós
DF	14	(Argentina) Agustín Lagos
DF	16	(Argentina) Lisandro Magallán		(substituted on) 86'
MF	11	(Argentina) Matías Pellegrini		(substituted on) 75'
MF	19	(Argentina) Leonel Roldán
MF	50	(Argentina) Tobías Andrada		(substituted on) 60'
FW	15	(Argentina) Dilan Godoy
FW	17	(Argentina) Álex Verón
FW	18	(Argentina) Manuel Fernández
FW	20	(Argentina) Francisco Pizzini
FW	48	(Argentina) Matias Arias
Manager:
(Argentina) Guillermo Barros Schelotto

Assistant referees:
Cristian Navarro
Pablo Acevedo
Fourth official:
Sebastián Zunino
Fifth official:
Gerardo Lencina
Video assistant referee:
Lucas Novelli
Assistant video assistant referees:
Héctor Paletta

**Match rules**

- 90 minutes.
- 30 minutes of extra time if necessary.
- Penalty shoot-out if scores still level.
- Twelve named substitutes.
- Maximum of five substitutions, with a sixth allowed in extra time.

=== Statistics ===
Overall
	Estudiantes (LP)	Vélez Sarsfield
Goals scored	0	2
Total shots	12	8
Shots on target	9	4
Ball possession	57%	43%
Corner kicks	6	4
Fouls committed	13	15
Offsides	3	0
Yellow cards	4	3
Red cards	1	0

2024 Supercopa Internacional winners
**Vélez Sarsfield**
**1st Title**
