= Tobías Andrada =

Argentine footballer (born 2005)

Personal information
- Full name: Tobías Luciano Andrada
- Date of birth: 2 February 2007 (age 19)
- Place of birth: Villa Luzuriaga, Argentina
- Height: 1.81 m (5 ft 11 in)
- Position: Midfielder

Team information
- Current team: River Plate
- Number: 50

Youth career
- 2014–2025: Vélez Sarsfield

Senior career*
Years	Team	Apps	(Gls)
2025–2026	Vélez Sarsfield	24	(1)
2026–	River Plate	6	(1)

International career^{‡}
2025–	Argentina U20	7	(0)
Medal record
Men's football
Representing Argentina
FIFA U-20 World Cup
Runner-up	2025 Chile
- * Club domestic league appearances and goals as of 17:05, 12 September 2026 (UTC) ‡ National team caps and goals as of 14:02, 19 September 2025 (UTC)

Tobías Luciano Andrada (born 2 February 2007) is an Argentine professional footballer who plays as a midfielder for Argentine Primera División club River Plate.

== Club career ==
A youth product of Vélez Sarsfield since the age of 7, Andrada signed his first contract with the club on 10 May 2025 until 2028. He made his senior and professional debut with Vélez Sarsfield in the 2024 Supercopa Internacional on 8 July 2025, a 2–0 win over Estudiantes de La Plata where he came on as a late substitute.

On 1 August 2026, Andrada joined River Plate, signing a contract until December 31, 2030.

== International career ==
Andrada made the final Argentina U20 squad for the 2025 FIFA U-20 World Cup.

== Honours ==
Vélez Sarsfield

- Supercopa Internacional: 2024
- Supercopa Argentina: 2024
