= Ivo Mammini =

Argentine footballer

Personal information
- Date of birth: 15 April 2003 (age 23)
- Place of birth: La Plata, Argentina
- Height: 1.78 m (5 ft 10 in)
- Position: Centre-forward

Team information
- Current team: FC Rànger's

Youth career
- Club VRADI
- 2012–2020: Gimnasia LP

Senior career*
Years	Team	Apps	(Gls)
2020–2026	Gimnasia LP	54	(5)
2026–	FC Rànger's	0	(0)
- * Club domestic league appearances and goals as of 18:22, 14 October 2026 (UTC)

Ivo Mammini (born 15 April 2003) is an Argentine professional footballer who plays as a centre-forward for FC Rànger's.

== Career ==
Mammini began with local side Club VRADI, before signing with Gimnasia y Esgrima in 2012. He spent the next eight years progressing through their youth system, which culminated with the centre-forward netting over fifty goals between 2017 and 2020. Mammini was promoted into the first-team in January 2020 under manager Diego Maradona. His senior debut arrived on 25 February in a Copa Argentina round of sixty-four victory over Sportivo Barracas, as he replaced Horacio Tijanovich for the final few minutes against Primera D Metropolitana opposition. He signed his first professional contract in the succeeding June.

In October 2026, he was signed by FC Rànger's of the Primera Divisió of Andorra.

== Career statistics ==
As of 20 February 2021.

Appearances and goals by club, season and competition
Club	Season	League			Cup		League Cup		Continental		Other		Total	
Club	Season	Division	Apps	Goals	Apps	Goals	Apps	Goals	Apps	Goals	Apps	Goals	Apps	Goals
Gimnasia y Esgrima	2019–20	Primera División	0	0	1	0	0	0	—		0	0	1	0
Gimnasia y Esgrima	2020–21 (Note: Soccerway counts 2020 Copa de la Liga Profesional appearances as league appearances.)	Primera División	0	0	0	0	0	0	—		0	0	0	0
Gimnasia y Esgrima	2021 (Note: Soccerway counts 2021 Copa de la Liga Profesional appearances as league appearances.)	Primera División	1	0	0	0	—		—		0	0	1	0
Career total			1	0	1	0	0	0	—		0	0	2	0
