= Rodrigo Atencio =

Argentine footballer (born 2002)

Personal information
- Full name: Rodrigo Uriel Atencio
- Date of birth: 30 June 2002 (age 24)
- Place of birth: Rosario, Argentina
- Height: 1.75 m (5 ft 9 in)
- Position: Winger

Team information
- Current team: Independiente Rivadavia (on loan from Sport Recife)
- Number: 19

Youth career
- Independiente

Senior career*
Years	Team	Apps	(Gls)
2022–2025	Independiente	6	(0)
2024	→ Central Córdoba (loan)	40	(4)
2025–	Sport Recife	22	(1)
2026–	→ Independiente Rivadavia (loan)	16	(0)
- * Club domestic league appearances and goals as of 16:36, 11 July 2026 (UTC)

Rodrigo Uriel Atencio (born 30 June 2002) is an Argentine footballer who plays mainly as a right winger for Independiente Rivadavia, on loan from Brazilian club Sport Recife.

== Career ==
=== Independiente ===
Born in Rosario, Atencio was an Independiente youth graduate. He made his first team – and Primera División – debut on 30 April 2022, coming on as a late substitute for Lucas González in a 1–0 away loss to Lanús.

In August 2023, Atencio was close to a loan move to fellow top tier side Sarmiento, but was kept in the squad after the arrival of Carlos Tevez as manager.

==== Loan to Central Córdoba ====
On 21 January 2024, Atencio moved to Central Córdoba de Santiago del Estero on loan for one year. He was an important player for Central Córdoba during the season, notably scoring four goals in the club's 2024 Copa Argentina winning campaign.

=== Sport Recife ===
On 24 January 2025, Atencio was announced at Campeonato Brasileiro Série A side Sport Recife on a five-year contract.

== Career statistics ==
As of 20 January 2025.

Club	Season	League			Cup		Continental		Other		Total	
Club	Season	Division	Apps	Goals	Apps	Goals	Apps	Goals	Apps	Goals	Apps	Goals
Independiente	2022	Primera División	1	0	0	0	0	0	—		1	0
Independiente	2023	Primera División	5	0	0	0	—		—		5	0
Independiente	Total		6	0	0	0	—		—		6	0
Central Córdoba (loan)	2024	Primera División	40 (Note: Soccerway counts Copa de la Liga Profesional appearances as league appearances.)	4	6	4	—		—		46	8
Sport Recife	2025	Série A	0	0	0	0	—		0	0	0	0
Career total			46	4	6	4	0	0	0	0	52	8

== Honours ==
Central Córdoba (SdE)

- Copa Argentina: 2024
