= Jano Gordon =

Argentine footballer (born 2005)

Personal information
- Full name: Jano Ieremía Gordon
- Date of birth: 16 June 2004 (age 22)
- Place of birth: Ituzaingó, Argentina
- Height: 1.82 m (6 ft 0 in)
- Position: Right-back

Team information
- Current team: Vélez Sarsfield
- Number: 21

Youth career
- 2011–2025: Vélez Sarsfield

Senior career*
Years	Team	Apps	(Gls)
2025–	Vélez Sarsfield	25	(1)
- * Club domestic league appearances and goals as of 17:02, 16 June 2026 (UTC) ‡ National team caps and goals as of 14:02, 19 September 2025 (UTC)

Jano Ieremía Gordon (born 16 June 2004) is an Argentine professional footballer who plays as a right-back for Argentine Primera División club Vélez Sarsfield.

== Club career ==
Gordon joined the youth academy of Vélez Sarsfield at the age of 7, and worked his way up all of their youth categories. On 12 July 2024, he signed his first professional contract with the club until 31 December 2026. He made his senior and professional debut with Vélez Sarsfield in a 2–0 Argentine Primera División loss to Instituto on 3 February 2025. He scored both goals in the 2024 Supercopa Argentina, a 2–0 win over Central Córdoba, helping his team win the trophy. On 11 July 2025, he extended his contract with Vélez Sarsfield until 2028.

== Honours ==
Vélez Sarsfield

- Supercopa Internacional: 2024
- Supercopa Argentina: 2024
