= José Florentín =

Paraguayan footballer (born 1996)

Personal information
- Full name: José Ignacio Florentín Bobadilla
- Date of birth: 5 July 1996 (age 30)
- Place of birth: Juan Emilio O'Leary, Paraguay
- Height: 1.81 m (5 ft 11 in)
- Position: Midfielder

Team information
- Current team: Independiente Rivadavia
- Number: 25

Youth career
- Guaraní

Senior career*
Years	Team	Apps	(Gls)
2019–2021	Guaraní	68	(17)
2022–2024	Vélez Sarsfield	55	(5)
2024–2026	Central Córdoba SdE	44	(7)
2026–	Independiente Rivadavia	16	(3)

International career^{‡}
2021–	Paraguay	3	(0)
- * Club domestic league appearances and goals as of 16:32, 11 July 2026 (UTC) ‡ National team caps and goals as of 21:02, 25 March 2022 (UTC)

José Ignacio Florentín Bobadilla (born 5 July 1996), known as José Florentín, is a Paraguayan footballer who plays for Independiente Rivadavia.

== International career ==
He made his debut for the Paraguay national football team on 2 September 2021 in a World Cup qualifier against Ecuador, a 0–2 away loss. He substituted Richard Sánchez in the 85th minute.

== Honours ==
Central Córdoba (SdE)

- Copa Argentina: 2024
