= Nicolás Monserrat =

Argentine professional footballer

Personal information
- Full name: Alexis Nicolás Monserrat
- Date of birth: 8 September 1996 (age 30)
- Place of birth: Argentina
- Height: 1.85 m (6 ft 1 in)
- Position: Centre-back

Team information
- Current team: Güemes

Youth career
- Tristán Suárez

Senior career*
Years	Team	Apps	(Gls)
2015–2018	Tristán Suárez	51	(0)
2018–2019	Almirante Brown	13	(0)
2019–2021	Argentino de Quilmes	24	(1)
2021	Almagro	2	(0)
2022–2024	Talleres RE	68	(4)
2025–	Güemes	25	(6)
- * Club domestic league appearances and goals as of 16:49, 13 August 2025 (UTC)

Alexis Nicolás Monserrat (born 8 September 1996) is an Argentine professional footballer who plays as a midfielder for Güemes.

== Career ==
Tristán Suárez were Monserrat's first club, as he began featuring for them in Primera B Metropolitana from 2015. Twenty-six appearances came in the aforementioned campaign, sixteen of which were as a starter. He didn't appear in the 2016 Primera B Metropolitana, though returned in 2016–17 to play twenty-five times; all but one was a start. However, Monserrat played just one minute of senior football in the succeeding season, which led to his departure from Tristán Suárez in July 2018 to Almirante Brown. He made his debut during a defeat to Estudiantes in the third tier on 20 August.

== Career statistics ==
As of 24 April 2019.

Appearances and goals by club, season and competition
Club	Season	League			Cup		League Cup		Continental		Other		Total	
Club	Season	Division	Apps	Goals	Apps	Goals	Apps	Goals	Apps	Goals	Apps	Goals	Apps	Goals
Tristán Suárez	2015	Primera B Metropolitana	25	0	0	0	—		—		1 (Note: Appearance(s) in the Primera B Metropolitana play-offs)	0	26	0
Tristán Suárez	2016	Primera B Metropolitana	0	0	0	0	—		—		0	0	0	0
Tristán Suárez	2016–17	Primera B Metropolitana	25	0	0	0	—		—		0	0	25	0
Tristán Suárez	2017–18	Primera B Metropolitana	1	0	0	0	—		—		0	0	1	0
Tristán Suárez	Total		51	0	0	0	—		—		1	0	52	0
Almirante Brown	2018–19	Primera B Metropolitana	13	0	0	0	—		—		0	0	13	0
Career total			64	0	0	0	—		—		1	0	65	0
