= Lucas Abascia =

Argentine footballer (born 1995)

Personal information
- Full name: Lucas Nicolás Abascia
- Date of birth: 10 December 1995 (age 30)
- Place of birth: Rosario, Argentina
- Height: 1.82 m (6 ft 0 in)
- Position: Centre-back

Team information
- Current team: Querétaro
- Number: 2

Youth career
- Bancario
- Rosario Central

Senior career*
Years	Team	Apps	(Gls)
2016	Tiro Federal	13	(3)
2017–2022	Sportivo Las Parejas	56	(0)
2021–2022	→ Deportivo Morón (loan)	52	(2)
2023–2025	Ñublense	17	(1)
2024	→ Quilmes (loan)	12	(0)
2024–2025	→ Central Córdoba SdE (loan)	43	(1)
2026–	Querétaro	16	(0)
- * Club domestic league appearances and goals as of 17:39, 12 March 2026 (UTC)

Lucas Nicolás Abascia (born 10 December 1995) is an Argentine professional footballer who plays as a centre-back for Liga MX club Querétaro.

== Club career ==
Born in Rosario, Argentina, Abascia was with both Bancario and Rosario Central as a youth player. At professional level, he started his career with Tiro Federal in the 2016 Torneo Federal B.

In January 2017, he switched to Sportivo Las Parejas, with whom he won the 2019 Copa Santa Fe. In 2021, he joined on loan to Deportivo Morón for two seasons.

In 2023, Abascia moved to Chile and signed with Ñublense in the Chilean Primera División. The next year, he was loaned out to Quilmes on a one-year deal with an option to buy.

On 24 June 2024, Abascia joined Central Córdoba SdE on loan.

== Personal life ==
On December 16, 2023, Abascia married Luciana Scrifignano.

== Honours ==
Central Córdoba (SdE)

- Copa Argentina: 2024
