= Omar De Felippe =

Argentine footballer (born 1962)

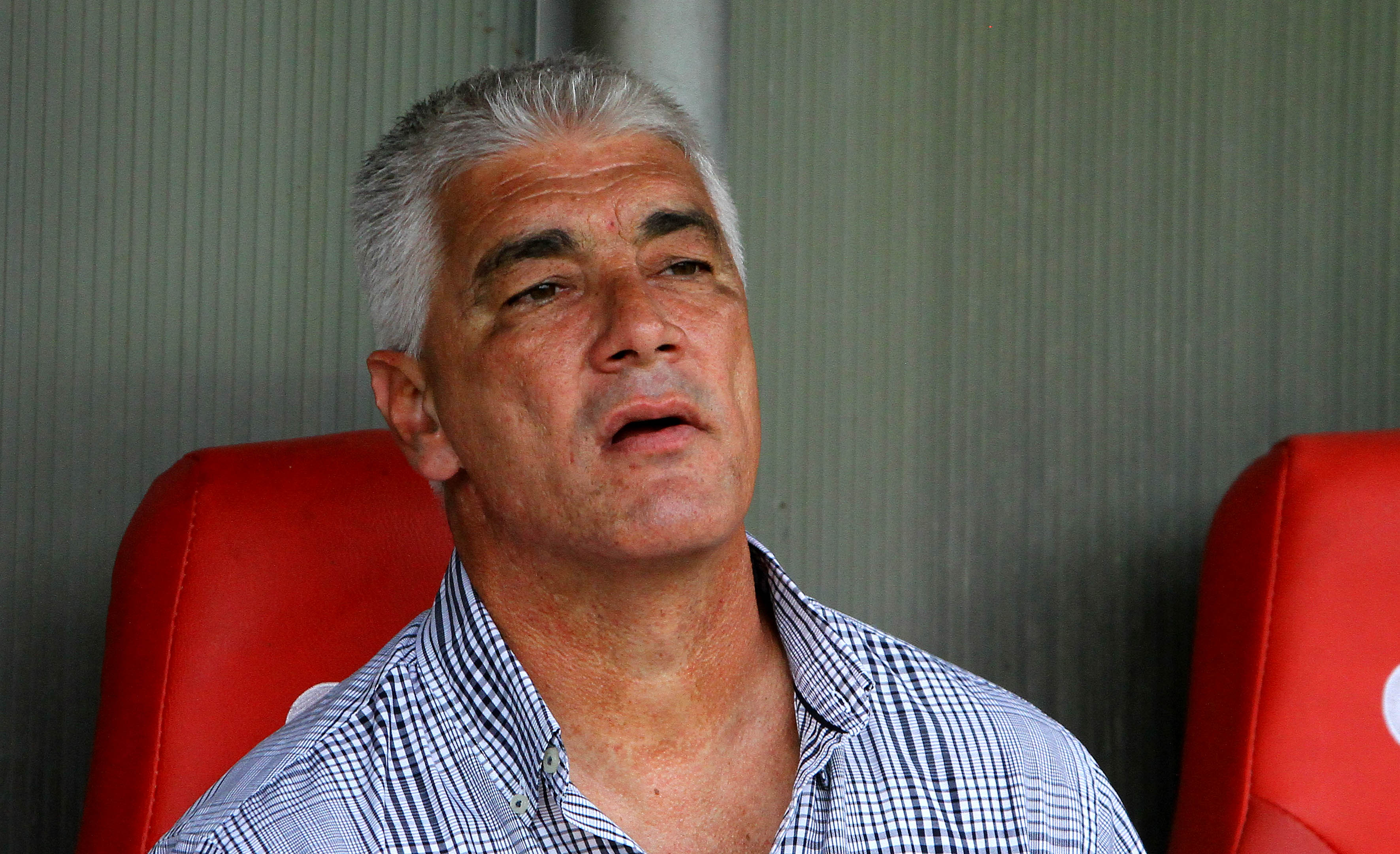
- De Felippe in 2015

Personal information
- Full name: Omar Osvaldo De Felippe
- Date of birth: 3 April 1962 (age 64)
- Place of birth: Buenos Aires, Argentina
- Position: Defender

Team information
- Current team: Talleres (manager)

Youth career
- Huracán

Senior career*
| Years | Team | Apps | (Gls) |
| 1983–1985 | Huracán | 28 | (0) |
| 1986 | Once Caldas | | |
- Olimpo
- Villa Mitre
| 1989–1990 | Arsenal de Sarandí | 17 | (2) |
- San Telmo

Managerial career
- 2009–2011: Olimpo
- 2012–2013: Quilmes
- 2013–2014: Independiente
- 2015–2016: Emelec
- 2016–2017: Vélez Sarsfield
- 2018: Newell's Old Boys
- 2021: Atlético Tucumán
- 2022: Platense
- 2023: Central Córdoba
- 2024–2025: Central Córdoba
- 2026–: Talleres
- * Club domestic league appearances and goals

Omar Osvaldo De Felippe (born 3 April 1962) is an Argentine soldier, war veteran, football coach and footballer, who played as a defender. He is the current manager of Talleres.

== Career ==
Born in Ciudad Madero, Buenos Aires, De Felippe began playing football with local side Huracán. He was playing for the club's third team when the Malvinas war began in 1982, and he was drafted into the infantry forces fighting for Argentina.

After the war, De Felippe returned to Huracán, where he would make his debut in the Argentine Primera División. He had a brief spell playing in Colombia with Once Caldas, before returning to Argentina to play in the regional leagues with Olimpo, Villa Mitre, Arsenal de Sarandí and San Telmo.

After he retired from playing, De Felippe began a career as a football manager. He led Club Olimpo, Quilmes and Independiente through promotion to the Primera División.

== Personal ==
De Felippe's brother, Walter Fabián, is a former professional footballer who also played in the Primera División with Huracán.

== Honours ==
=== Manager ===
Olimpo

- Primera B Nacional: 2009–10

Emelec

- Serie A: 2015

Central Córdoba

- Copa Argentina: 2024
