= Leonardo Marchi =

Argentine professional footballer

Personal information
- Full name: Leonardo Marchi Rivero
- Date of birth: 17 September 1996 (age 30)
- Place of birth: La Plata, Argentina
- Height: 1.80 m (5 ft 11 in)
- Position: Left-back

Team information
- Current team: Central Córdoba SdE
- Number: 3

Youth career
- Gimnasia y Esgrima
- 2015–2018: Defensa y Justicia

Senior career*
Years	Team	Apps	(Gls)
2018–2020	Defensa y Justicia	0	(0)
2018–2020	→ Arsenal de Sarandí (loan)	0	(0)
2020–2023	Arsenal de Sarandí	13	(0)
2021	→ Mitre (loan)	3	(0)
2023–2024	Giouchtas	9	(0)
2024–	Central Córdoba SdE	18	(0)
- * Club domestic league appearances and goals as of 17:17, 12 November 2026 (UTC)

Leonardo Marchi Rivero (born 17 September 1996) is an Argentine professional footballer who plays as a left-back for Central Córdoba SdE.

== Career ==
Marchi joined the system of Defensa y Justicia from Gimnasia y Esgrima in 2015. In July 2018, Marchi left on loan to Primera B Nacional side Arsenal de Sarandí for twelve months. He failed to make an appearance as they won promotion to the Primera División; though was on the bench six total times. His loan expired on 30 June 2019, though he remained for one further season but only featured for their reserves. In August 2020, Marchi signed a new contract with Arsenal; lasting until December 2021. His senior bow soon came, aged twenty-four, against Racing Club on 14 November 2020.

== Personal life ==
Marchi is the son of Sergio Marchi, who was the secretary general of the Futbolistas Argentinos Agremiados, Argentina's players' union.

== Career statistics ==
As of 16 November 2020.

Appearances and goals by club, season and competition
Club	Season	League			Cup		League Cup		Continental		Other		Total	
Club	Season	Division	Apps	Goals	Apps	Goals	Apps	Goals	Apps	Goals	Apps	Goals	Apps	Goals
Defensa y Justicia	2018–19	Primera División	0	0	0	0	0	0	0	0	0	0	0	0
Defensa y Justicia	2019–20	Primera División	0	0	0	0	0	0	0	0	0	0	0	0
Defensa y Justicia	Total		0	0	0	0	0	0	0	0	0	0	0	0
Arsenal de Sarandí (loan)	2018–19	Primera B Nacional	0	0	0	0	0	0	—		0	0	0	0
Arsenal de Sarandí (loan)	2019–20	Primera División	0	0	0	0	0	0	—		0	0	0	0
Arsenal de Sarandí	2020–21 (Note: Soccerway counts Copa de la Liga Profesional appearances as league appearances.)	Primera División	1	0	0	0	0	0	—		0	0	1	0
Arsenal de Sarandí	Total		1	0	0	0	0	0	—		0	0	1	0
Career total			1	0	0	0	0	0	0	0	0	0	1	0

== Honours ==
Central Córdoba (SdE)

- Copa Argentina: 2024
