= Tomás Galván =

Argentine professional footballer

Personal information
- Full name: Tomás Ezequiel Galván
- Date of birth: 11 April 2000 (age 26)
- Place of birth: El Talar, Argentina
- Height: 1.72 m (5 ft 8 in)
- Position: Midfielder

Team information
- Current team: River Plate
- Number: 26

Youth career
- 2005–2006: El Talar
- 2006–2021: River Plate

Senior career*
Years	Team	Apps	(Gls)
2021–	River Plate	38	(7)
2022	→ Defensa y Justicia (loan)	28	(2)
2023	→ Colón (loan)	26	(5)
2024	→ Tigre (loan)	36	(2)
2025–2026	→ Vélez Sarsfield (loan)	18	(2)
- * Club domestic league appearances and goals as of 20:50, 19 September (UTC)

Tomás Ezequiel Galván (born 11 April 2000) is an Argentine professional footballer who plays as a midfielder for Argentine Primera Division club River Plate.

== Club career ==
Galván is youth product of River Plate, having joined their academy at the age of 6. In 2021, he signed a contract keeping him at the club until 31 December 2022. He debuted for River Plate in an Argentine Primera División match against their rivals Boca Juniors in the Superclásico. The game was 1–1 before heading to overtime, and finished 4–2 in penalties.

In January 2022, Galván joined Defensa y Justicia on a one-year dry loan. A year later, in January 2023, he moved on a new loan spell, this time at Colón.

== Honours ==
Vélez Sarsfield

- Supercopa Internacional: 2024
