= Facundo Mansilla =

Argentine footballer (born 1999)

Personal information
- Full name: Zahir Facundo Mansilla
- Date of birth: 27 February 1999 (age 27)
- Place of birth: Rosario, Argentina
- Height: 1.90 m (6 ft 3 in)
- Position: Defender

Team information
- Current team: Central Córdoba SdE
- Number: 6

Youth career
- 2013–2021: Newell's Old Boys

Senior career*
| Years | Team | Apps | (Gls) |
| 2021–2026 | Newell's Old Boys | 50 | (2) |
| 2024 | → Sport Boys (loan) | 24 | (0) |
| 2025 | → Central Córdoba SdE (loan) | 7 | (0) |
| 2026– | Central Córdoba SdE | 21 | (1) |
- * Club domestic league appearances and goals as of 17:17, 12 November 2026 (UTC)

Zahir Facundo Mansilla (born 27 February 1999) is an Argentine professional footballer who plays as a defender for Central Córdoba SdE.

== Career ==
Born in Rosario, Mansilla joined the Newell's Old Boys youth set-up in 2013. He made his first-team debut on 17 May 2021 against Sarmiento in the Copa Argentina. He made his league debut in a 3–2 win over Talleres de Córdoba on 17 July 2021. On 4 September 2021, it was announced that Mansilla had signed a new contract with the club until December 2023, and he scored the first goal of his career later that day with a volley in a 1–1 draw against Colón.
