= Favio Cabral =

Argentine footballer

Personal information
- Full name: Favio Benjamín Cabral
- Date of birth: 5 February 2001 (age 25)
- Place of birth: Villa Corina, Argentina
- Height: 1.87 m (6 ft 2 in)
- Position: Forward

Team information
- Current team: Chacarita Juniors (on loan from Mitre)

Youth career
- Talleres

Senior career*
Years	Team	Apps	(Gls)
2020–2023	Talleres	6	(0)
2021	→ Curicó Unido (loan)	1	(0)
2022	→ Almagro (loan)	3	(0)
2022	→ Douglas Haig (loan)	18	(6)
2023	→ Cipolletti (loan)	33	(12)
2023–2024	Talleres RdE	2	(0)
2024–	Mitre	16	(3)
2024–2025	→ Central Córdoba SdE (loan)	33	(5)
2026–	→ Chacarita Juniors (loan)	3	(0)
- * Club domestic league appearances and goals as of 17:36, 12 March 2026 (UTC)

Favio Benjamín Cabral (born 5 February 2001) is an Argentine professional footballer who plays as a forward for Primera Nacional side Chacarita Juniors, on loan from Mitre.

== Professional career ==
In May 2019, Cabral signed his first professional contract with Talleres . Cabral made his professional debut for Talleres in a 4-1 Argentine Primera División loss to Defensa y Justicia on 26 January 2020.

In April 2021, he was loaned to Chilean Primera División side Curicó Unido with an option to buy. After returning, he was sent out on a new loan spell in January 2022, this time to Primera Nacional side Club Almagro until the end of the year. However, the spell at Almagro was terminated before time, and Cabral instead joined Douglas Haig in June 2022 on loan until the end of the year.

== Honours ==
Central Córdoba (SdE)

- Copa Argentina: 2024
