= Patricio Ostachuk =

Argentine footballer

Personal information
- Full name: Javier Patricio Ostachuk
- Date of birth: 5 May 2000 (age 26)
- Place of birth: Oberá, Argentina
- Height: 1.80 m (5 ft 11 in)
- Position: Centre-back

Team information
- Current team: Atlanta (on loan from Independiente)

Youth career
- 2004–2014: Olimpia / San Antonio
- 2015: Newell's Old Boys
- 2016–2020: Independiente

Senior career*
Years	Team	Apps	(Gls)
2020–	Independiente	23	(0)
2024	→ Deportivo Maipú (loan)	26	(0)
2025	→ Tristán Suárez (loan)	33	(1)
2026–	→ Atlanta (loan)	3	(0)
- * Club domestic league appearances and goals as of 16:28, 24 April 2026 (UTC)

Javier Patricio Ostachuk (born 5 May 2000) is an Argentine professional footballer who plays as a centre-back for Atlanta on loan from Independiente.

== Career ==
Patrick Ostachuk began his youth career as a midfielder in 2004, aged four, with Olimpia de Oberá; which would later be known as Olimpia / San Antonio after a merger. In 2014, Ostachuk had a number of trials with Newell's Old Boys - who would sign him in 2015. However, Ostachuk remained at Newell's for just one year before departing. 2016 saw Ostachuk, following a trial, join Independiente. He made the breakthrough into first-team football in 2020, having transitioned into a centre-back in the preceding years. Ostachuk made his senior debut on 6 December 2020 during a Copa de la Liga Profesional victory over Defensa y Justicia.

== Career statistics ==
As of 7 December 2020

Appearances and goals by club, season and competition
Club	Season	League			National cup		League cup		Continental		Other		Total	
Club	Season	Division	Apps	Goals	Apps	Goals	Apps	Goals	Apps	Goals	Apps	Goals	Apps	Goals
Independiente	2020–21 (Note: Soccerway counts Copa de la Liga Profesional appearances as league appearances.)	Argentine Primera División	1	0	0	0	0	0	0	0	0	0	1	0
Career total			1	0	0	0	0	0	0	0	0	0	1	0
