= Claudio Aquino =

Argentine footballer (born 1991)

Personal information
- Full name: Claudio Ezequiel Aquino
- Date of birth: July 24, 1991 (age 35)
- Place of birth: Adrogué, Argentina Nationality = Paraguay
- Height: 1.72 m (5 ft 7 1/2 in)
- Positions: Winger; midfielder

Team information
- Current team: Colo-Colo
- Number: 10

Senior career*
Years	Team	Apps	(Gls)
2009–2012	Ferro Carril Oeste	27	(1)
2012–2013	Defensa y Justicia	17	(2)
2013–2015	Godoy Cruz	32	(4)
2015–2017	Independiente	27	(1)
2016	→ Fluminense (loan)	2	(0)
2017	→ Belgrano (loan)	13	(0)
2017–2018	Unión Santa Fe	7	(0)
2018–2020	Guaraní	56	(12)
2020–2023	Cerro Porteño	113	(29)
2023–2024	Vélez Sarsfield	57	(15)
2025–	Colo-Colo	0	(0)
- * Club domestic league appearances and goals as of 10 January 2025

Claudio Ezequiel Aquino (born 24 July 1991) is an Argentine professional footballer who plays as a winger or midfielder for Colo-Colo in the Chilean Primera División.

== Career ==
In 2016, Aquino joined Brazilian club Fluminense on loan from Independiente.

In 2025, Aquino moved to Chile and signed with Colo-Colo, taking the number 10.

== Honours ==
Vélez Sarsfield

- Argentine Primera División: 2024
