= Francisco Pizzini =

Argentine footballer

Personal information
- Full name: Francisco Andrés Pizzini
- Date of birth: 19 September 1993 (age 33)
- Place of birth: Bahía Blanca, Argentina
- Height: 1.79 m (5 ft 10 1/2 in)
- Position: Left winger

Team information
- Current team: Emelec
- Number: 10

Youth career
- Independiente

Senior career*
Years	Team	Apps	(Gls)
2011–2021	Independiente	59	(2)
2016–2017	→ Olimpo (loan)	44	(3)
2020–2021	→ Defensa y Justicia (loan)	21	(2)
2021–2022	Defensa y Justicia	40	(11)
2022–2023	Talleres	42	(5)
2023–2026	Vélez Sarsfield	81	(8)
2026–	Emelec	2	(0)
- * Club domestic league appearances and goals as of 21:15, 14 March 2026 (UTC)

Francisco Andrés Pizzini (born 19 September 1993 in Bahía Blanca) is an Argentine football player, who plays as a winger for Ecuadorian Serie A club Emelec.

== Club career ==
Pizzini debuted with Independiente in a 0 - 3 defeat against All Boys on 12 May 2012. In July 2014 he scored the only 2 goals of the match against Belgrano for the round of 16 of the 2013–14 Copa Argentina.

== Career statistics ==
As of 9 April 2025.

Club statistics
Club	Division	League			Cup		Continental		Total	
Club	Division	Season	Apps	Goals	Apps	Goals	Apps	Goals	Apps	Goals
Independiente	Primera División	2011-12	4	0	1	0	—		5	0
Independiente	Primera División	2012-13	7	0	—		—		7	0
Independiente	Primera B Nacional	2013-14	20	1	1	0	—		21	1
Independiente	Primera División	2014	15	1	2	2	—		17	1
Independiente	Primera División	2015	7	0	1	0	—		8	0
Olimpo	Primera División	2016	15	0	1	1	—		16	1
Olimpo	Primera División	2016-17	29	3	2	0	—		31	3
Olimpo	Total		44	3	3	1	0	0	47	4
Independiente	Primera División	2017-18	—		—		—		0	0
Independiente	Primera División	2018-19	5	0	3	0	4	0	12	0
Independiente	Primera División	2019-20	2	0	1	0	4	0	7	0
Independiente	Total		60	2	9	2	8	0	77	4
Defensa y Justicia	Primera División	2019-20	5	1	3	0	4	0	12	1
Defensa y Justicia	Primera División	2020	—		6	0	9	1	15	1
Defensa y Justicia	Primera División	2021	22	7	10	1	4	1	36	9
Defensa y Justicia	Primera División	2022	4	1	15	3	2	0	21	4
Defensa y Justicia	Total		31	9	34	4	19	2	84	15
Talleres	Primera División	2022	20	2	4	0	4	0	28	2
Talleres	Primera División	2023	22	3	1	0	—		23	3
Talleres	Total		42	5	5	0	4	0	51	5
Vélez Sarsfield	Primera División	2023	—		14	0	—		14	0
Vélez Sarsfield	Primera División	2024	27	4	22	5	—		49	9
Vélez Sarsfield	Primera División	2025	11	0	1	0	1	1	13	1
Vélez Sarsfield	Total		38	4	37	5	1	1	76	10
Career total			215	23	88	12	32	3	335	38

== Honours ==
Vélez Sarsfield

- Argentine Primera División: 2024
- Supercopa Internacional: 2024
