= Agustín Bouzat =

Argentine footballer (born 1994)

- Bouzat with Houston Dynamo FC in 2026

Personal information
- Date of birth: 28 March 1994 (age 32)
- Place of birth: Bahía Blanca, Argentina
- Height: 1.70 m (5 ft 7 in)
- Position: Midfielder

Team information
- Current team: Houston Dynamo
- Number: 30

Youth career
- Liniers

Senior career*
Years	Team	Apps	(Gls)
2011–2012	Liniers	12	(0)
2012–2018	Boca Juniors	3	(0)
2016–2017	→ Defensa y Justicia (loan)	39	(3)
2018–2026	Vélez Sarsfield	188	(11)
2022–2023	→ Colo-Colo (loan)	38	(1)
2026–	Houston Dynamo	17	(1)
- * Club domestic league appearances and goals as of 17:54, 21 August 2026 (UTC)

Agustín Bouzat (born 28 March 1994) is an Argentine professional footballer who plays as a midfielder for Houston Dynamo.

== Career ==
Bouzat started his senior career in 2011 with Liniers, playing twelve times in Torneo Argentino B. He joined Boca Juniors of the Argentine Primera División in early 2012. In January 2016, Bouzat completed a season-long loan move to fellow Primera División team Defensa y Justicia. He scored on his professional debut, in a 2–2 draw with Unión Santa Fe on 7 February. In total, Bouzat went on to make forty-five appearances for the club and scored three goals. He returned to Boca Juniors ahead of the 2017–18 campaign and made his league debut on 23 September 2017 in a 0–4 win against Vélez Sarsfield.

Ahead of January 2018, Bouzat departed Boca Juniors to join Vélez Sarsfield. His first appearance for Vélez came versus former club Defensa y Justicia on 27 January.

In June 2022, he was loaned to Colo-Colo by Vélez Sarsfield on a deal for eighteen months with an option to buy.

On 13 January 2026, Bouzat joined Major League Soccer side Houston Dynamo until June 2028.

== Career statistics ==
As of 23 June 2020.

Club statistics
Club	Season	League			Cup		League Cup		Continental		Other		Total	
Club	Season	Division	Apps	Goals	Apps	Goals	Apps	Goals	Apps	Goals	Apps	Goals	Apps	Goals
Liniers	2011–12	Torneo Argentino B	12	0	0	0	—		—		0	0	12	0
Boca Juniors	2011–12	Primera División	0	0	0	0	—		0	0	0	0	0	0
Boca Juniors	2012–13	Primera División	0	0	0	0	—		0	0	0	0	0	0
Boca Juniors	2013–14	Primera División	0	0	0	0	—		0	0	0	0	0	0
Boca Juniors	2014	Primera División	0	0	0	0	—		0	0	0	0	0	0
Boca Juniors	2015	Primera División	0	0	0	0	—		0	0	0	0	0	0
Boca Juniors	2016	Primera División	0	0	0	0	—		0	0	0	0	0	0
Boca Juniors	2016–17	Primera División	0	0	0	0	—		0	0	0	0	0	0
Boca Juniors	2017–18	Primera División	3	0	2	0	—		0	0	0	0	5	0
Boca Juniors	Total		3	0	2	0	—		0	0	0	0	5	0
Defensa y Justicia (loan)	2016	Primera División	9	1	1	0	—		—		0	0	10	1
Defensa y Justicia (loan)	2016–17	Primera División	30	2	2	0	—		3 (Note: Appearance(s) in Copa Sudamericana)	0	0	0	35	2
Defensa y Justicia (loan)	Total		39	3	3	0	—		3	0	0	0	45	3
Vélez Sarsfield	2017–18	Primera División	15	2	0	0	—		—		0	0	15	2
Vélez Sarsfield	2018–19	Primera División	23	4	1	0	4	1	—		0	0	28	5
Vélez Sarsfield	2019–20	Primera División	19	0	0	0	0	0	—		0	0	19	0
Vélez Sarsfield	Total		57	6	1	0	4	1	0	0	0	0	62	7
Career total			111	9	6	0	4	1	3	0	0	0	124	10

== Honours ==
Colo-Colo

- Chilean Primera División: 2022
- Copa Chile: 2023

Vélez Sarsfield

- Argentine Primera División: 2024
- Supercopa Internacional: 2024
