= Copa Argentina =

Football cup competition

- Organiser(s): AFA
- Founded: 1969; 2011 (relaunch)
- Region: Argentina
- Teams: 64 (2025)
- Qualifier for: Copa Libertadores; Supercopa Argentina
- Related competitions: Primera División; Supercopa Argentina
- Current champions: Independiente Rivadavia (2025)
- Most championships: Boca Juniors (4 titles)
- Broadcasters: TyC Sports (Argentina); Fanatiz (worldwide exc. Brazil, through TyC Internacional channel); Xsports (Brazil)
- Website: copaargentina.org
- 2026 Copa Argentina

The Copa Argentina (English: Argentine Cup), officially known as the Copa Argentina "AXION energy" due to sponsorship reasons, is an official football cup competition organized by the Argentine Football Association (AFA).

The first editions of the championship were contested by teams playing in Primera División that did not earn eligibility to participate in the Copa Libertadores of the following year, and the best placed clubs playing in regional leagues.

The tournament was re-launched in 2011, with teams of all divisions that form the Argentine football league system taking part of the championship. The winner of Copa Argentina qualifies for the Supercopa Argentina against the reigning champions of Primera División.

Boca Juniors is the most successful team with four titles won, the latest in 2019–20.

== History ==
=== Background ===
The "Campeonato de la República" (or Copa General Pedro Ramírez) had been the first Argentine cup contested by clubs playing not only in Primera División but in regional leagues as well, with a total of 35 teams in the first edition. The cup was held from 1943 to 1945.

A new international competition, "Copa Ganadores de Copa (also known as "Recopa Sudamericana"), organised by CONMEBOL in 1970 as a South American counterpart of UEFA Cup Winners' Cup, served as inspiration to the Argentine Association to create a new competition, with the winner team being eligible to play the 1970 edition of Copa Ganadores de Copa.

=== First edition: 1969 ===
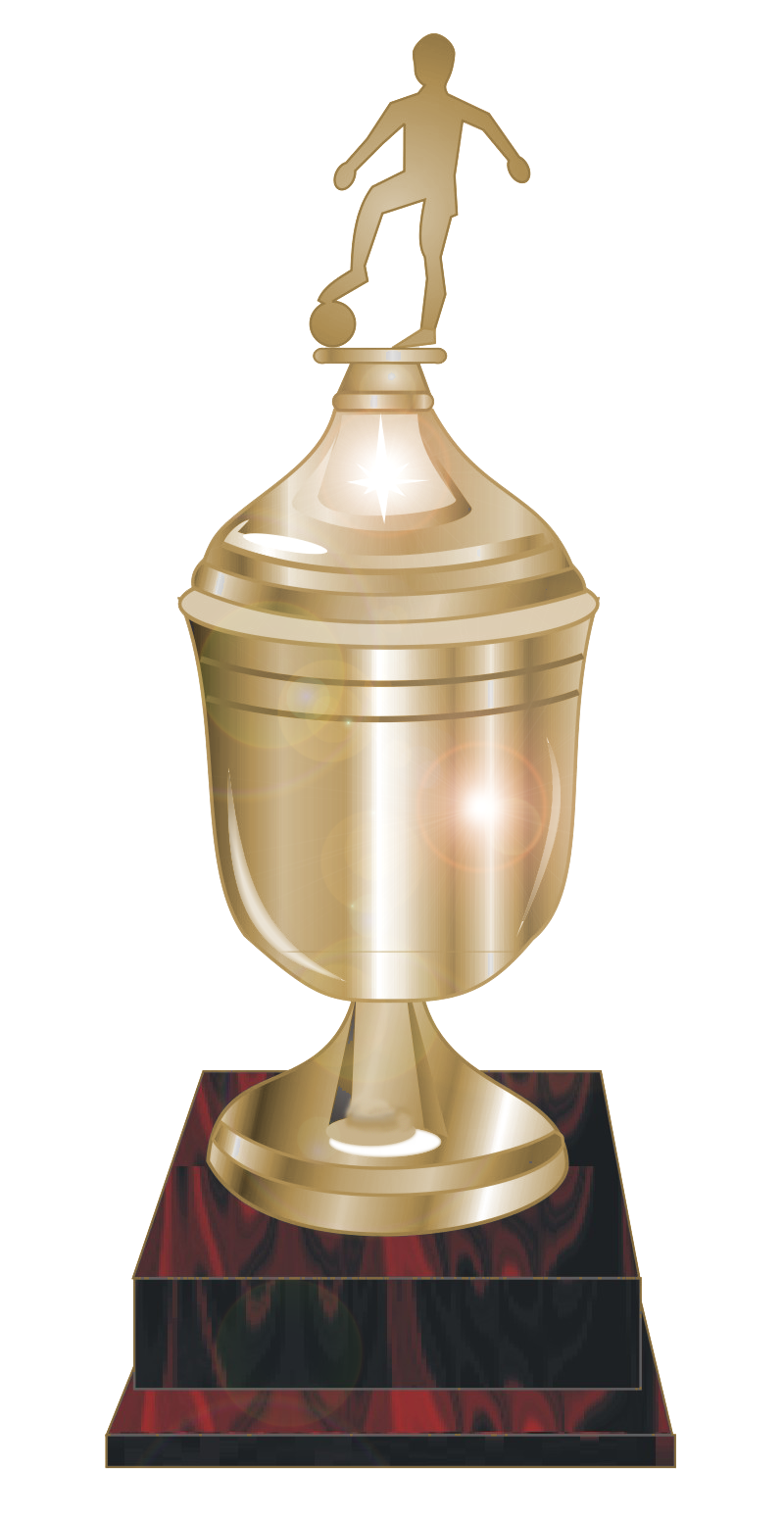
The original trophy of Copa Argentina, awarded in 1969 and 1970. When the competition was relaunched in 2011, a new cup was designed for the occasion

The competition was contested by 32 teams using a two-legged elimination format. Two points were awarded for winning a leg, one for a draw and null for a loss. The teams having more points would qualify to the next round. If both teams had the same number of points, it would be determined by the total number of goals, total number of goals conceded, and penalty shootout accordingly.

All teams in the Primera División Argentina participated in the competition with some top teams from the regional leagues, except teams that had already qualified to the Copa Libertadores, namely, Vélez Sársfield and River Plate, the winners and runners-up of 1968 Nacional respectively, and Estudiantes (LP), the champions of 1968 Copa Libertadores.

Boca Juniors and Atlanta entered the final. Boca won the tournament by defeating Atlanta 3–2 on aggregate after two matches were played.

However, as Boca later won the 1969 Nacional and qualified to the 1970 Copa Libertadores, Atlanta qualified to the 1970 "Copa Ganadores de Copa" as the runner-up.

=== Second edition: 1970 ===
Apart from teams that had got the Copa Libertadores eligibility, namely Boca Juniors and River Plate, the champions and runners-up of Nacional 1969, and Estudiantes (LP), who won the Copa Libertadores 1969, all clubs in the Primera División Argentina participated this competition. The champions of Primera B, Ferro, also took part in the tournament, along with 13 top clubs from regional leagues.

Copa Argentina 1970 never finished. 32 teams played the competition and San Lorenzo and Vélez Sársfield entered the final. The tournament had been lasting for a long period in that year. Starting in March 1970, the first leg of the final was played in March 1971. At that time, the Copa Ganadores de Copa, which the winner of Copa Argentina would be qualifying for, had already started. Moreover, as Huracán Buceo and Deportes Concepción, the two other team in the same group with the Argentine representative in the Copa Ganadores de Copa, had not confirmed their participation, so the organizer announced the Copa Ganadores de Copa would become a friendly tournament. Therefore, after the first leg of the Copa Argentina final was held, which the teams drew 2–2, the second leg was never played. No Argentine teams participated in the Copa Ganadores de Copa 1971.

=== Relaunch ===
The rescheduling of the Copa Argentina, officialized in 2011, included 186 teams of 7 divisions of the Argentine football league system in a knock-out system competition. All the matches were disputed in neutral locations. The teams of the first division were included in rounds of 32. The champion of the tournament qualified for the next edition of Copa Sudamericana.

For the relaunching of the tournament, a new trophy was designed. The cup, made of aluminium, was manufactured at the Norberto Ambrosetti factory of Lobos, Buenos Aires.

The 2012 final between Boca and Racing was scheduled many times due to fixture congestion. The match was finally played on August 8, 2012, at the Estadio del Bicentenario in San Juan. Boca Juniors won its second trophy after defeating Racing by 2–1.

The 2012–13 Copa Argentina was scheduled to begin October 23, 2012 in a new two-phase knock-out competition. Arsenal defeated San Lorenzo and won its first trophy of this competition.

== Champions ==
The following is the list of Copa Argentina winners with the finals played:

- (In bracket, title count):

Ed.	Year	Champion	Score(s)	Runner-up	Venue(s)	City
1	1969	Boca Juniors (1)	3–1, 0–1 (Note: Two-legged format, Boca Juniors won 3–2 on goal difference.)	Atlanta	Gasómetro (Note: Venue for both matches.)	Buenos Aires
2	1970	(no champion crowned) (Note: The competition was abandoned as the second leg between San Lorenzo and Vélez Sarsfield was never played. In the first leg, both teams had tied 2–2)			Estadio Atlanta	Buenos Aires
3	2011–12	Boca Juniors (2)	2–1	Racing	Bicentenario	San Juan
4	2012–13	Arsenal (1)	3–0	San Lorenzo	Bicentenario	Catamarca
5	2013–14	Huracán (1)	0–0 (5–4, p)	Rosario Central	Bicentenario	San Juan
6	2014–15	Boca Juniors (3)	2–0	Rosario Central	Mario A. Kempes	Córdoba
7	2015–16	River Plate (1)	4–3	Rosario Central	Mario A. Kempes	Córdoba
8	2016–17	River Plate (2)	2–1	Atlético Tucumán	Malvinas Argentinas	Mendoza
9	2017–18	Rosario Central (1)	1–1 (4–1, p)	Gimnasia y Esgrima (LP)	Malvinas Argentinas	Mendoza
10	2018–19	River Plate (3)	3–0	Central Córdoba (SdE)	Malvinas Argentinas	Mendoza
11	2019–20	Boca Juniors (4)	0–0 (5–4, p)	Talleres (C)	Madre de Ciudades	Santiago del Estero
–	2020–21	(Not held because of COVID-19 pandemic in Argentina)				
12	2021–22	Patronato (1)	1–0	Talleres (C)	Malvinas Argentinas	Mendoza
13	2023	Estudiantes (LP) (1)	1–0	Defensa y Justicia	Ciudad de Lanús	Lanús
14	2024	Central Córdoba (SdE) (1)	1–0	Vélez Sarsfield	15 de Abril	Santa Fe
15	2025	Independiente Rivadavia (1)	2–2 (5–3, p)	Argentinos Juniors	Monumental Presidente Perón	Córdoba
16	2026					

== Titles by club ==
Rank	Club	Titles	Runners-up	Seasons won	Seasons runner-up
1	Boca Juniors	4	—	1969, 2011–12, 2014–15, 2019–20	—
2	River Plate	3	—	2015–16, 2016–17, 2018–19	—
3	Rosario Central	1	3	2017–18	2013–14, 2014–15, 2015–16
3	Central Córdoba (SdE)	1	1	2024	2018–19
3	Arsenal	1	—	2012–13	—
3	Huracán	1	—	2013–14	—
3	Patronato	1	—	2021–22	—
3	Estudiantes (LP)	1	—	2023	—
3	Independiente Rivadavia	1	—	2025	—
—	Talleres (C)	—	2	—	2019–20, 2021–22
—	Atlanta	—	1	—	1969
—	Racing	—	1	—	2011–12
—	San Lorenzo	—	1	—	2012–13
—	Atlético Tucumán	—	1	—	2016–17
—	Gimnasia y Esgrima (LP)	—	1	—	2017–18
—	Defensa y Justicia	—	1	—	2023
—	Vélez Sarsfield	—	1	—	2024
—	Argentinos Juniors	—	1	—	2025

== Top Scorers ==
=== By season ===
Ed.	Player	Goals	Club
1969	(Argentina) Daniel Quevedo	7	Lanús
1970	(Argentina) Rubén Ayala	5	San Lorenzo
2011–12	(Argentina) Ramón Ábila	3	Sarmiento (J)
2012–13	(Argentina) Daniel Bazán Vera	5	Tristán Suárez
2013–14	(Argentina) Mariano Gorosito	5	Luján
2013–14	(Uruguay) Walter Ibáñez	5	Sanjustino (Santa Fe)
2014–15	(Argentina) Luis Luna	5	Vélez Sársfield (SdE)
2015–16	(Argentina) Lucas Alario	7	River Plate
2016–17	(Argentina) Maximiliano Tunessi	7	Sol de Mayo (Viedma)
2017–18	(Argentina) Héctor M. Rueda	5	Dep. Rincón (Neuquén)
2017–18	(Argentina) Luis A. Silba	5	Sarmiento (R)
2018–19	(Argentina) Christian Duma	4	Douglas Haig
2019–20	(Uruguay) Michael Santos	4	Talleres (C)
2021–22	(Argentina) Jesús Dátolo	4	Banfield
2021–22	(Argentina) Marcelo L. Estigarribia	4	Patronato
2023	(Paraguay) Gabriel Ávalos	3	Argentinos Juniors
2023	(Argentina) Enzo A. Fernández	3	Almagro
2023	(Uruguay) Miguel Merentiel	3	Boca Juniors
2024	(Argentina) Rodrigo Atencio	4	Central Córdoba (S)
2024	(Uruguay) Edinson Cavani	4	Boca Juniors
2025	(Argentina) Tomás Molina	5	Argentinos Juniors

=== All-time ===
Rank.	Player	Goals
1	(Argentina) Ramón Ábila	15
2	(Uruguay) Martín Cauteruccio	12
3	(Argentina) Ignacio Scocco	11
4	(Argentina) Ignacio Fernández	10
4	(Argentina) Nicolás Blandi	10
5	(Argentina) Darío Benedetto	9
5	(Argentina) José Sand	9

== See also ==
- List of Argentine football national cups
- Argentine Primera División
- Supercopa Argentina
