= Central Córdoba de Santiago del Estero =

Argentine sports club

Coordinates: 27°47′37.8″S 64°15′51.6″W

Central Córdoba
- Full name: Club Atlético Central Córdoba
- Nickname: El Ferroviario (The Railroad)
- Founded: 3 June 1919; 107 years ago
- Ground: Estadio Alfredo Terrera
- Capacity: 20,000
- Chairman: José Félix Alfano
- Manager: Sebastián Domínguez
- League: Argentine Primera División
- 2024: 22nd
- Website: cacentralcordoba.com
Home colours	Away colours	Third colours

Club Atlético Central Córdoba is an Argentine sports club based in Santiago del Estero. The club is mostly known for its football team, which currently plays in the Argentine Primera División, first division of the Argentine football league system. The club was founded by a group of railway workers and named after the Córdoba Central Railway in a similar manner to the other Central Córdoba club based in Rosario.

== History ==
Central Córdoba has played at the highest level of Argentine football on 2 occasions, more specifically in the 1967 and 1971 Nacional championships. In the 1967 Nacional, Central Córdoba finished 14th of 16 teams, having reached its peak with the 2–1 victory over Boca Juniors in La Bombonera.

In 1971 Central Córdoba finished 13th out of 14 teams in group B, with their most significant achievement being a 1–1 draw to Boca Juniors, although soon later the team would be heavily defeated at the hands of San Lorenzo by 7–1.

On 8 June 2019, Central Córdoba won promotion to the Primera División after defeating Sarmiento in the 2018–19 promotion play-off finals. It marked their return to the top-flight for the first time in 48 years. In their first season back they finished 18th in the table.

The club made the final of the 2018–19 Copa Argentina for the first time in its history. They kicked off their run while still in the Primera B, beating Nueva Chicago 1–0, in the round of 32 they beat All Boys by the same score, then beat Villa Mitre to set up a quarter-final with Estudiantes de La Plata, winning 1–0. In the semi-final they beat Lanus by the same score to set up the final with River Plate on 13 December 2019, losing 3–0 in Mendoza.

On 11 December 2024 they beat Vélez Sarsfield 1–0, with a long range goal by Matías Godoy, to win the 2024 Copa Argentina in Santa Fe. It was the first major trophy in the history of the club, along by their first ever qualification to an international competition, the 2025 Copa Libertadores. They became the first and only team from the Santiago del Estero Province to win these achievements.

== Players ==
=== Current squad ===
As of 23 September 2026

Note: Flags indicate national team as defined under FIFA eligibility rules; some limited exceptions apply. Players may hold more than one non-FIFA nationality.

No.	Pos.	Nation	Player
1	GK	ARG	Alan Aguerre (captain)
2	DF	ARG	Alejandro Maciel (on loan from Olimpia)
3	DF	ARG	Leonardo Marchi
5	MF	ARG	Tiago Cravero (on loan from Belgrano)
6	DF	ARG	Facundo Mansilla
7	FW	ARG	Diego Barrera (on loan from Talleres)
8	MF	ARG	Fernando Juárez (on loan from Platense)
9	FW	ARG	Lucas Varaldo
10	MF	ARG	Marco Iacobellis (on loan from All Boys)
11	MF	ARG	Horacio Tijanovich
12	GK	ARG	Máximo Alvarez
13	DF	ARG	José Gómez
17	DF	ARG	Yuri Casermeiro
18	MF	ARG	Lucas González (on loan from Defensa y Justicia)
19	FW	ARG	Ezequiel Naya (on loan from Estudiantes)

No.	Pos.	Nation	Player
20	DF	ARG	Fernando Martínez
21	DF	COL	Felipe Aguilar
22	MF	ARG	Matías Vera
23	DF	PAR	Darío Cáceres
25	GK	ARG	Javier Vallejos
26	DF	ARG	Lucas Bernabéu
27	FW	URU	Michael Santos (on loan from Vélez Sarsfield)
28	FW	ARG	Leonardo Sequeira (on loan from Huracán)
29	FW	ARG	Joaquín Flores (on loan from Club Atlético River Plate)
33	DF	ARG	Santiago Moyano
37	FW	ARG	Alan Daian Laprida (on loan from Independiente)
42	DF	ARG	Juan Pablo Pignani (on loan from Platense)
47	FW	ARG	Martín Cuitiño
55	MF	PAR	Juan Cardozo (on loan from Argentinos Juniors)

=== Out on loan ===
Note: Flags indicate national team as defined under FIFA eligibility rules; some limited exceptions apply. Players may hold more than one non-FIFA nationality.

No.	Pos.	Nation	Player

== Current staff ==
Position	Name
Head coach	(Argentina) Lucas Pusineri
Assistant coach	(Argentina) Emiliano Romero
Assistant coach	(Argentina) Matías Villavicencio
Fitness coach	(Argentina) Juan Manuel López
Fitness coach	(Argentina) Francisco Galván
Fitness coach	(Argentina) Guillermo Torrens
Goalkeeper coach	(Argentina) Ariel Trejo
Video analyst	(Argentina) Llamil Godoy
Kit man	(Argentina) Waldo Carol
Kit man	(Argentina) Nahuel Umbides
Kit man	(Argentina) Daniel Corbalán
Kit man	(Argentina) Federico Anríquez
Director of medical department	(Argentina) Mariano De Marco
Doctor	(Argentina) Mario Herrera
Doctor	(Argentina) Horacio Abregú
Kinesiologist	(Argentina) Juan Tarchini
Kinesiologist	(Argentina) Gonzalo Pérez
Kinesiologist	(Argentina) Juan Cruz Simón
Nutritionist	(Argentina) Gianfranco Mayuli
Nutritionist	(Argentina) Nahuel Padilla
Masseur	(Argentina) Diego Trejo

== Honours ==
=== National ===
- Copa Argentina (1): 2024

Titles won in lower divisions:

- Torneo Federal A (2): 2014, 2017–18
- Torneo del Interior (1): 1986
- Torneo Argentino B (1): 1997–98

=== Regional ===
Liga Santiagueña de Fútbol

- Primera A LSF (48): 1945, 1957(2), 1959 (2), 1960 (2), 1961 (2), 1962, 1963 (2), 1964 (2), 1965 (2), 1966, 1967, 1969(2), 1970, 1971 (3), 1972, 1974, 1975 (2), 1976, 1978, 1980, 1981, 1983 (2), 1984 (3), 1985 (2), 1986, 1988 (Revalida), 1990 (Revalida), Clausura 1995, Apertura 1997, Ronda Final 1998, Liguilla 1999, 2010, 2023
- Primera B LSF (2): 1923, 2001
- Copa Santiago (1): 2014
