= 2022 Primera Nacional =

38th season of the second-tier football league in Argentina

Primera Nacional
- Season: 2022
- Dates: 11 February – 19 November 2022
- Champions: Belgrano (1st title)
- Promoted: Belgrano; Instituto
- Relegated: Sacachispas; Santamarina
- Matches: 682
- Goals: 1,382 (2.03 per match)
- Top goalscorer: Pablo Vegetti (17 goals)
- Biggest home win: Chacarita Juniors 5–0 Alvarado (27 March); San Martín (SJ) 5–0 Sacachispas (3 July)
- Biggest away win: San Telmo 0–4 Villa Dálmine (27 March); Villa Dálmine 1–5 Gimnasia y Esgrima (M) (2 April); San Martín (T) 0–4 Mitre (SdE) (22 April); Dep. Riestra 0–4 Gimnasia y Esgrima (J) (7 May); Santamarina 0–4 Instituto (17 June)
- Highest scoring: Tristán Suárez 3–4 Nueva Chicago (18 March); Villa Dálmine 4–3 Nueva Chicago (14 July)

The 2022 Argentine Primera Nacional, also known as the Campeonato de Primera Nacional Torneo Malvinas Argentinas 2022, was the 38th season of the Primera Nacional, the second-tier competition of Argentine football. The season began on 11 February and ended on 19 November 2022. Thirty-seven teams competed in the league, thirty-three returning from the 2021 season, two teams promoted from Torneo Federal A and two from Primera B Metropolitana.

Belgrano were the champions, clinching direct promotion as well as their first title in the competition with two matches in hand and a 3–2 victory over Brown (A) on 25 September 2022. Instituto were the other promoted team, winning the Torneo Reducido after defeating Estudiantes (BA) in the final.

== Format ==
Thirty-seven teams played each other once for a total of thirty-six rounds. The top-placed team was the champion and also earned promotion to the Primera División. The teams placed from second to thirteenth place competed in the "Torneo Reducido" for the second promotion berth after the regular season ended, with the team placed second entering in the third round, the team placed third entering in the second round and the remaining teams entering in the first round. The bottom two teams were relegated at the end of the season, as relegation was reinstated after being suspended for two years due to the COVID-19 pandemic.

The draw to decide the fixture of the season was held on 13 January 2022 at the Argentine Football Association's Ezeiza offices.

== Club information ==
=== Stadia and locations ===
Locations of the 2022 Primera Nacional teams outside Greater Buenos Aires.
Locations of the 2022 Primera Nacional teams within Greater Buenos Aires.

Club	City	Province	Stadium	Capacity
Agropecuario Argentino	Carlos Casares	Buenos Aires	Ofelia Rosenzuaig	8,000
All Boys	Buenos Aires	—	Islas Malvinas	12,199
Almagro	José Ingenieros	Buenos Aires	Tres de Febrero	12,500
Almirante Brown	Isidro Casanova	Buenos Aires	Fragata Presidente Sarmiento	25,000
Alvarado	Mar del Plata	Buenos Aires	José María Minella	35,180
Atlanta	Buenos Aires	—	Don León Kolbowsky	14,000
Atlético de Rafaela	Rafaela	Santa Fe	Nuevo Monumental	16,000
Belgrano	Córdoba	Córdoba	Julio César Villagra	30,000
Brown	Adrogué	Buenos Aires	Lorenzo Arandilla	4,500
Chacarita Juniors	Villa Maipú	Buenos Aires	Chacarita Juniors	19,000
Chaco For Ever	Resistencia	Chaco	Juan Alberto García	23,000
Defensores de Belgrano	Buenos Aires	—	Juan Pasquale	9,000
Deportivo Madryn	Puerto Madryn	Chubut	Abel Sastre	8,000
Deportivo Maipú	Maipú	Mendoza	Omar Higinio Sperdutti	8,000
Deportivo Morón	Morón	Buenos Aires	Nuevo Francisco Urbano	32,000
Deportivo Riestra	Buenos Aires	—	Guillermo Laza	3,000
Estudiantes	Caseros	Buenos Aires	Ciudad de Caseros	16,740
Estudiantes	Río Cuarto	Córdoba	Antonio Candini	15,000
Ferro Carril Oeste	Buenos Aires	—	Ricardo Etcheverry	24,442
Flandria	Jáuregui	Buenos Aires	Carlos V	5,000
Gimnasia y Esgrima	Jujuy	Jujuy	23 de Agosto	23,200
Gimnasia y Esgrima	Mendoza	Mendoza	Víctor Legrotaglie	11,500
Güemes	Santiago del Estero	Santiago del Estero	Arturo Miranda	15,000
Guillermo Brown	Puerto Madryn	Chubut	Raúl Conti	15,000
Independiente Rivadavia	Mendoza	Mendoza	Bautista Gargantini	24,000
Instituto	Córdoba	Córdoba	Presidente Perón	26,535
Mitre	Santiago del Estero	Santiago del Estero	José y Antonio Castiglione	10,500
Nueva Chicago	Buenos Aires	—	Nueva Chicago	28,500
Quilmes	Quilmes	Buenos Aires	Centenario	35,200
Sacachispas	Buenos Aires	—	Roberto Larrosa	4,000
San Martín	San Juan	San Juan	Ingeniero Hilario Sánchez	17,000
San Martín	Tucumán	Tucumán	La Ciudadela	30,250
San Telmo	Dock Sud	Buenos Aires	Osvaldo Baletto	2,000
Santamarina	Tandil	Buenos Aires	Municipal General San Martín	8,762
Temperley	Temperley	Buenos Aires	Alfredo Beranger	13,000
Tristán Suárez	Tristán Suárez	Buenos Aires	20 de Octubre	15,000
Villa Dálmine	Campana	Buenos Aires	El Coliseo de Mitre y Puccini	12,000

== League table ==
Pos	Team	Pld	W	D	L	GF	GA	GD	Pts	Promotion, qualification or relegation
1	Belgrano (C, P)	36	24	7	5	48	23	+25	79	Promotion to Primera División and qualification for Copa Argentina
2	Instituto (P)	36	19	11	6	47	23	+24	68	Advance to Torneo Reducido semi-finals and qualification for Copa Argentina
3	San Martín (T)	36	17	15	4	45	21	+24	66	Advance to Torneo Reducido second round and qualification for Copa Argentina
4	Gimnasia y Esgrima (M)	36	17	13	6	41	20	+21	64	Advance to Torneo Reducido first round and qualification for Copa Argentina
5	All Boys	36	15	15	6	45	33	+12	60	Advance to Torneo Reducido first round and qualification for Copa Argentina
6	Estudiantes (RC)	36	14	16	6	39	29	+10	58	Advance to Torneo Reducido first round and qualification for Copa Argentina
7	Estudiantes (BA)	36	16	9	11	33	27	+6	57	Advance to Torneo Reducido first round and qualification for Copa Argentina
8	Almagro	36	16	9	11	35	33	+2	57	Advance to Torneo Reducido first round and qualification for Copa Argentina
9	Independiente Rivadavia	36	15	11	10	45	34	+11	56	Advance to Torneo Reducido first round and qualification for Copa Argentina
10	Chaco For Ever	36	13	16	7	38	28	+10	55	Advance to Torneo Reducido first round and qualification for Copa Argentina
11	Deportivo Riestra	36	12	18	6	34	26	+8	54	Advance to Torneo Reducido first round and qualification for Copa Argentina
12	Defensores de Belgrano	36	13	15	8	37	30	+7	54	Advance to Torneo Reducido first round and qualification for Copa Argentina
13	Deportivo Morón	36	12	17	7	31	21	+10	53	Advance to Torneo Reducido first round and qualification for Copa Argentina
14	San Martín (SJ)	36	15	6	15	50	42	+8	51	Qualification for Copa Argentina
15	Chacarita Juniors	36	12	12	12	48	44	+4	48	Qualification for Copa Argentina
16	Ferro Carril Oeste	36	12	11	13	32	34	−2	47	
17	Deportivo Madryn	36	10	16	10	44	42	+2	46	
18	Atlanta	36	11	13	12	33	32	+1	46	
19	Quilmes	36	11	13	12	42	46	−4	46	
20	Deportivo Maipú (Note: Deportivo Maipú were deducted 3 points as punishment for incidents in their match against Tristán Suárez.)	36	11	15	10	39	32	+7	45	
21	Mitre (SdE)	36	11	12	13	36	37	−1	45	
22	Brown (A)	36	11	11	14	39	39	0	44	
23	Gimnasia y Esgrima (J)	36	11	11	14	38	50	−12	44	
24	Guillermo Brown	36	12	7	17	30	43	−13	43	
25	Almirante Brown	36	9	15	12	38	43	−5	42	
26	Temperley	36	9	14	13	34	41	−7	41	
27	Güemes	36	8	15	13	28	35	−7	39	
28	San Telmo	36	9	12	15	36	52	−16	39	
29	Atlético de Rafaela	36	8	14	14	40	43	−3	38	
30	Agropecuario Argentino	36	7	17	12	25	30	−5	38	
31	Villa Dálmine	36	7	17	12	36	48	−12	38	
32	Alvarado	36	8	13	15	31	46	−15	37	
33	Tristán Suárez	36	7	14	15	37	44	−7	35	
34	Nueva Chicago	36	6	14	16	33	48	−15	32	
35	Flandria	36	6	13	17	30	49	−19	31	
36	Santamarina (R)	36	6	11	19	29	58	−29	29	Relegation to Torneo Federal A
37	Sacachispas (R)	36	3	18	15	21	41	−20	27	Relegation to Primera B Metropolitana

Source: AFA
Rules for classification: 1) points; 2) play-off (only for deciding promotion or relegation); 3) goal difference; 4) goals scored; 5) head-to-head points; 6) head-to-head goal difference; 7) head-to-head goals scored.
(C) Champions; (P) Promoted; (R) Relegated

== Results ==
Home \ Away	AGA	ALL	ALM	CAB	ALV	ATL	ATR	BEL	BRO	CHA	CFE	DBE	DEM	DMA	DMO	DRI	EBA	ERC	FCO	FLA	GEJ	GEM	GÜE	GBR	IND	INS	MIT	NCH	QUI	SAC	SMA	SMT	STE	SAN	TEM	TRI	VDA
Agropecuario Argentino	—	—	2–2	1–1	—	1–0	—	0–1	1–1	—	0–0	—	—	2–0	0–0	—	—	0–1	—	0–0	—	0–1	2–0	1–1	2–1	2–0	2–0	—	—	—	—	1–1	—	1–2	—	—	—
All Boys	0–0	—	—	—	3–1	1–0	—	—	1–0	—	2–2	—	1–1	—	—	1–1	—	—	3–1	—	2–0	1–1	—	1–0	—	—	—	3–0	3–1	2–1	—	2–2	—	1–0	2–0	—	2–2
Almagro	—	0–0	—	—	1–0	—	3–1	—	—	1–3	—	0–1	1–1	1–0	—	0–1	1–1	—	—	—	2–0	—	—	—	1–0	0–1	2–1	—	—	—	1–0	—	2–1	—	1–1	1–0	1–0
Almirante Brown	—	2–2	0–0	—	—	—	1–0	—	—	4–2	—	2–3	—	2–1	1–1	1–1	1–0	2–2	—	0–1	—	—	—	—	2–0	0–1	2–0	—	—	—	1–0	—	1–1	—	—	2–2	2–2
Alvarado	0–0	—	—	0–2	—	3–1	—	0–1	1–2	—	0–3	—	—	—	0–1	—	—	0–1	1–1	2–2	—	0–0	2–1	1–0	—	—	—	0–0	3–0	1–1	—	3–1	—	3–0	—	—	—
Atlanta	—	—	1–1	1–1	—	—	0–0	1–1	—	1–1	3–1	0–2	—	0–0	1–1	—	1–0	0–0	—	3–1	—	4–1	3–1	—	0–2	0–0	0–1	—	—	—	—	—	—	—	—	1–0	—
Atlético de Rafaela	2–2	4–1	—	—	4–0	—	—	—	1–0	—	—	—	1–1	—	—	0–2	1–2	—	0–1	—	3–0	—	—	4–1	—	—	—	1–1	1–2	1–1	3–0	1–1	2–1	—	1–0	—	1–1
Belgrano	—	2–1	2–1	1–0	—	—	1–0	—	—	3–0	—	3–0	—	1–0	1–0	2–1	2–1	0–0	—	2–0	—	—	—	—	1–1	1–0	1–3	—	—	—	2–0	—	3–1	—	—	4–1	—
Brown (A)	—	—	3–0	0–0	—	1–2	—	2–3	—	—	1–2	0–0	—	1–2	1–0	—	—	1–1	—	3–0	—	1–2	1–1	2–0	1–1	2–1	0–3	—	—	—	—	—	—	0–1	—	1–0	—
Chacarita Juniors	1–1	2–0	—	—	5–0	—	3–1	—	2–1	—	—	—	0–2	—	—	1–1	0–1	—	1–1	—	0–0	—	—	—	—	—	—	3–1	2–2	0–1	1–1	0–0	4–1	—	2–2	—	0–0
Chaco For Ever	—	—	0–1	0–0	—	—	1–0	3–1	—	2–0	—	1–0	—	2–2	1–0	—	0–0	3–0	—	2–2	—	1–0	0–0	—	1–1	1–2	1–0	—	—	—	2–1	—	—	—	—	1–0	—
Defensores de Belgrano	0–0	1–1	—	—	2–1	—	1–1	—	—	2–0	—	—	1–2	—	—	1–0	1–0	—	2–2	—	1–2	—	—	—	—	—	—	1–1	1–0	1–1	2–0	0–0	0–0	—	0–2	—	0–0
Deportivo Madryn	1–0	—	—	2–0	1–1	4–1	—	1–1	1–1	—	3–2	—	—	—	0–1	—	—	—	1–3	3–2	—	2–0	0–1	0–1	—	—	—	1–0	1–1	2–0	—	1–2	—	1–1	—	—	—
Deportivo Maipú	—	1–1	—	—	0–1	—	0–0	—	—	1–1	—	3–1	2–2	—	—	2–2	0–1	—	—	—	3–0	—	—	—	1–1	1–1	1–0	1–0	—	—	2–2	—	2–0	—	2–1	1–1	4–0
Deportivo Morón	—	0–0	3–0	—	—	—	2–0	—	—	0–1	—	1–1	—	1–0	—	1–1	0–1	2–2	—	—	1–1	—	—	—	1–1	1–0	1–0	—	—	—	0–0	—	3–1	—	1–1	0–0	1–0
Deportivo Riestra	1–0	—	—	—	3–0	1–0	—	—	1–0	—	1–1	—	0–0	—	—	—	—	—	1–0	—	0–4	0–0	1–0	1–1	—	—	—	3–0	1–1	2–0	—	0–0	—	2–0	1–2	—	1–1
Estudiantes (BA)	2–0	2–0	—	—	2–0	—	—	—	1–0	—	—	—	0–0	—	—	0–0	—	—	1–2	—	1–0	—	—	3–2	—	—	—	1–0	2–1	1–1	1–0	0–0	2–0	1–0	0–0	—	2–2
Estudiantes (RC)	—	1–1	1–0	—	—	—	0–0	—	—	2–0	—	0–2	1–1	0–1	—	2–0	2–1	—	—	—	3–1	—	—	—	4–1	1–1	0–0	—	—	—	3–1	—	2–1	—	0–0	1–1	4–1
Ferro Carril Oeste	2–2	—	2–0	1–0	—	1–0	—	2–0	0–1	—	0–0	—	—	0–1	1–2	—	—	0–0	—	1–2	—	0–0	1–0	1–0	0–0	—	—	—	—	1–1	—	1–4	—	1–0	—	—	—
Flandria	—	0–1	0–3	—	—	—	2–1	—	—	1–2	—	1–1	—	1–1	0–0	0–0	1–2	0–1	—	—	0–0	—	—	—	0–1	0–4	0–0	—	—	—	4–0	—	3–3	—	—	0–1	3–1
Gimnasia y Esgrima (J)	1–0	—	—	3–0	3–2	1–1	—	1–0	3–3	—	1–1	—	0–0	—	—	—	—	—	0–1	—	—	0–3	0–2	3–1	—	—	—	2–0	3–1	1–1	—	1–1	—	1–0	3–0	—	—
Gimnasia y Esgrima (M)	—	—	1–0	1–0	—	—	1–1	0–1	—	2–1	—	0–1	—	1–1	1–0	—	1–0	2–0	—	2–1	—	—	1–1	—	2–0	2–0	3–0	—	—	—	0–1	—	3–0	—	—	0–0	—
Güemes	—	0–2	1–2	2–1	—	—	1–1	0–1	—	0–1	—	0–0	—	2–1	0–0	—	1–1	2–0	—	0–0	—	—	—	—	0–0	1–1	1–1	—	—	—	1–1	—	0–1	—	—	0–0	—
Guillermo Brown	—	—	0–1	3–1	—	1–0	—	0–1	—	0–0	1–0	0–3	—	0–1	0–0	—	—	0–1	—	1–0	—	0–1	1–1	—	3–2	2–0	2–1	—	—	—	—	—	—	1–0	—	1–0	—
Independiente Rivadavia	—	1–1	—	—	1–0	—	1–0	—	—	2–3	—	3–1	3–0	—	—	2–0	2–0	—	—	—	3–1	—	—	—	—	1–2	1–0	1–0	1–0	—	0–0	—	4–0	—	1–1	2–1	0–0
Instituto	—	2–0	—	—	0–0	—	0–0	—	—	2–0	—	2–1	3–1	—	—	1–1	1–0	—	3–2	—	4–0	—	—	—	—	—	—	2–1	0–0	1–0	2–1	—	2–0	—	1–0	3–0	0–0
Mitre (SdE)	—	1–0	—	—	0–0	—	2–2	—	—	0–3	—	0–0	1–0	—	—	1–1	2–0	—	1–1	—	2–0	—	—	—	—	1–1	—	0–0	1–3	—	0–1	—	2–1	—	1–2	2–1	3–2
Nueva Chicago	1–0	—	2–3	2–2	—	1–0	—	0–1	0–0	—	1–0	—	—	—	1–1	—	—	0–0	0–1	0–1	—	1–1	0–2	2–2	—	—	—	—	2–1	1–1	—	0–0	—	4–0	—	—	—
Quilmes	1–1	—	1–1	2–0	—	1–3	—	0–0	1–1	—	2–0	—	—	1–0	2–1	—	—	1–1	2–1	1–0	—	0–0	0–2	1–0	—	—	—	—	—	1–1	—	2–2	—	2–0	—	—	—
Sacachispas	0–0	—	0–1	0–1	—	0–0	—	1–1	1–2	—	0–1	—	—	1–1	0–2	—	—	0–1	—	1–1	—	0–0	0–2	0–0	3–1	—	1–1	—	—	—	—	0–2	—	2–1	—	—	—
San Martín (SJ)	3–0	0–1	—	—	0–0	0–1	—	—	3–2	—	—	—	3–2	—	—	0–1	—	—	1–0	—	3–0	—	—	4–1	—	—	—	3–1	2–1	5–0	—	0–2	2–1	4–0	4–1	—	4–0
San Martín (T)	—	—	2–0	2–0	—	0–0	—	1–0	2–1	—	0–0	—	—	1–0	0–0	—	—	2–0	—	3–0	—	0–0	4–0	1–0	2–0	0–0	0–4	—	—	—	—	—	—	4–0	—	1–0	—
San Telmo	0–0	1–1	—	—	0–1	1–0	—	—	1–1	—	1–1	—	2–1	—	—	0–0	—	—	2–0	—	0–0	—	—	4–1	—	—	—	1–1	3–2	0–0	—	1–0	—	1–1	3–1	—	0–4
Santamarina	—	—	0–0	2–2	—	1–2	3–1	0–1	—	2–1	2–2	1–1	—	0–0	1–2	—	—	1–1	—	1–1	—	0–2	4–2	—	0–3	0–4	1–1	—	—	—	—	—	—	—	—	0–0	—
Temperley	2–0	—	—	1–1	0–0	0–2	—	1–1	0–1	—	0–0	—	1–1	—	—	—	—	—	1–0	2–0	—	1–1	1–0	0–1	—	—	—	2–2	2–3	1–0	—	1–2	—	3–1	—	—	—
Tristán Suárez	0–0	0–1	—	—	3–3	—	4–0	—	—	3–2	—	0–2	1–1	—	—	1–1	2–0	—	0–0	—	2–2	—	—	—	—	—	—	3–4	2–2	2–1	3–0	—	0–2	—	2–1	—	1–1
Villa Dálmine	1–0	—	—	—	1–1	0–0	—	0–1	0–1	—	0–0	—	3–3	—	—	—	—	—	1–0	—	3–0	1–5	0–0	1–2	—	—	—	4–3	2–0	0–0	—	2–0	—	0–3	0–0	—	—

Source: AFA
Legend: Blue = home team win; Yellow = draw; Red = away team win.

== Torneo Reducido ==
Teams ending in positions 2 to 13 played the Torneo Reducido for the second and last promotion berth to Primera División, in which teams were seeded in each round according to their final placement in the first stage of the tournament. The first two rounds were played over a single leg, at the stadium of the higher-seeded team. The semi-finals and finals were played over two legs, with the higher-seeded team hosting the second leg. In all rounds, the higher-seeded team advanced in case of a tie.

=== First round ===
15 October 2022	Estudiantes (BA)	3–0	Chaco For Ever	Caseros
18:10 UTC−3	Castelli 7'; Pereyra 19' (pen.); Bolzicco 90+2'	Report		Stadium: Ciudad de Caseros; Referee: Sebastián Zunino

15 October 2022	All Boys	0–2	Defensores de Belgrano	Buenos Aires
20:10 UTC−3		Report	Aguirre 45'; Benegas 90+1'	Stadium: Islas Malvinas; Referee: Yamil Possi

16 October 2022	Gimnasia y Esgrima (M) (bsr)	1–1	Deportivo Morón	Mendoza
13:10 UTC−3	Ciccolini 41' (pen.)	Report	Zárate 11'	Stadium: Víctor Legrotaglie; Referee: Gastón Brizuela

16 October 2022	Almagro	1–2	Independiente Rivadavia	José Ingenieros
18:05 UTC−3	Servetto 18'	Report	Navarro 24'; Quiroga 44'	Stadium: Tres de Febrero; Referee: Pablo Giménez

16 October 2022	Estudiantes (RC)	1–0	Deportivo Riestra	Río Cuarto
18:10 UTC−3	Arturia 26'	Report		Stadium: Antonio Candini; Referee: José Carreras

=== Second round ===
22 October 2022	Gimnasia y Esgrima (M)	1–0	Independiente Rivadavia	Mendoza
16:50 UTC−3	Solari 23'	Report		Stadium: Víctor Legrotaglie; Referee: Leandro Rey Hilfer

22 October 2022	San Martín (T)	0–3	Defensores de Belgrano	Tucumán
21:10 UTC−3		Report	Benegas 9', 60'; Olivares 49'	Stadium: La Ciudadela; Referee: Fernando Espinoza

23 October 2022	Estudiantes (RC)	0–1	Estudiantes (BA)	Río Cuarto
19:05 UTC−3		Report	Castelli 8'	Stadium: Antonio Candini; Referee: Nicolás Ramírez

=== Semi-finals ===
Team 1	Agg.	Team 2	1st leg	2nd leg
Defensores de Belgrano	0–2	Instituto	0–0	0–2
Estudiantes (BA)	2–0	Gimnasia y Esgrima (M)	1–0	1–0

==== First leg ====
29 October 2022	Estudiantes (BA)	1–0	Gimnasia y Esgrima (M)	Caseros
21:10 UTC−3	Castelli 33'	Report		Stadium: Ciudad de Caseros; Referee: Pablo Giménez

30 October 2022	Defensores de Belgrano	0–0	Instituto	Buenos Aires
18:05 UTC−3		Report		Stadium: Juan Pasquale; Referee: Silvio Trucco

==== Second leg ====
5 November 2022	Gimnasia y Esgrima (M)	0–1 (0–2 agg.)	Estudiantes (BA)	Mendoza
17:00 UTC−3		Report	Cantero 87'	Stadium: Víctor Legrotaglie; Referee: Pablo Dóvalo

5 November 2022	Instituto	2–0 (2–0 agg.)	Defensores de Belgrano	Córdoba
21:10 UTC−3	S. Rodríguez 34'; Bochi 90+1'	Report		Stadium: Presidente Perón; Referee: Andrés Merlos

=== Finals ===
The winners of this double-legged series were the second team promoted to Primera División.

2022 Torneo Reducido finals
(2nd. promotion playoffs)
12 November 2022
20:10 UTC−3
First leg

Estudiantes (BA)	0–0	Instituto
	Report

Estadio Ciudad de Caseros, Caseros
Referee: Luis Lobo Medina

19 November 2022
20:10 UTC−3
Second leg

Instituto	1–1	Estudiantes (BA)
Alarcón 56'	Report	Randazzo 13'

Estadio Presidente Perón, Córdoba
Referee: Fernando Espinoza

Team details

Instituto (C)
Estudiantes (BA)

GK	1	(Argentina) Jorge Carranza (c)
DF	4	(Argentina) Giuliano Cerato	Booked
DF	6	(Argentina) Fernando Alarcón
DF	2	(Argentina) Matías Ferreira	Booked
DF	3	(Argentina) Sebastián Corda	Booked
MF	8	(Argentina) Gabriel Graciani
MF	7	(Argentina) Claudio Pombo		Substituted off
MF	5	(Argentina) Roberto Bochi
MF	10	(Argentina) Franco Watson		Substituted off
MF	11	(Argentina) Santiago Rodríguez
FW	9	(Argentina) Patricio Cucchi		Substituted off
Substitutes:
DF	13	(Argentina) Agustín Gómez		Substituted on
MF	15	(Argentina) Nicolás Watson		Substituted on
MF	19	(Argentina) Jonathan Dellarosa		Substituted on
FW	20	(Argentina) Nicolás Mazzola		Substituted on Substituted off
Manager:
(Argentina) Lucas Bovaglio

GK	1	(Argentina) Lucas Bruera
DF	4	(Argentina) Delfor Minervino
DF	2	(Argentina) Juan Cruz Randazzo	Booked
DF	6	(Argentina) Stefano Brundo	Booked
DF	3	(Argentina) Lautaro Lusnig	Sent off (straight red)
MF	8	(Argentina) Sebastián Mayorga		Substituted off
MF	5	(Argentina) Nicolás Pelaitay
MF	7	(Argentina) Enzo Acosta		Substituted off
MF	10	(Argentina) Facundo Pereyra (c)		Substituted off
FW	11	(Argentina) Alan Cantero		Substituted off
FW	9	(Argentina) Facundo Castelli	Booked	Substituted off
Substitutes:
DF	14	(Argentina) Diego F. López		Substituted on
FW	17	(Argentina) Elías Alderete		Substituted on	Booked Sent off (straight red)
FW	18	(Argentina) Franco Lonardi		Substituted on
FW	19	(Argentina) Tomás Bolzicco		Substituted on
FW	20	(Argentina) Lautaro Parisi		Substituted on
Manager:
(Argentina) Walter Otta

Tied 1–1 on aggregate, Instituto won on having a better season record.

== Season statistics ==
=== Top scorers ===
Rank	Player	Club	Goals
1	(Argentina) Pablo Vegetti	Belgrano	17
2	(Argentina) Octavio Bianchi	All Boys	15
3	(Argentina) Luis Silba	Estudiantes (RC)	14
3	(Argentina) Matías Giménez	San Martín (SJ)	14
3	(Argentina) Braian Oyola	Tristán Suárez	14
6	(Argentina) Nicolás Servetto	Almagro	13
6	(Argentina) Claudio Bieler	Atlético de Rafaela	13
6	(Argentina) Mateo Acosta	Brown (A)	13
6	(Argentina) Enzo Díaz	Ferro Carril Oeste	13
6	(Argentina) Gabriel Graciani	Instituto	13

== See also ==
- 2022 Argentine Primera División
- 2022 Torneo Federal A
- 2021–22 Copa Argentina
