= 2023 Copa Argentina =

Tournament details
- Country: Argentina
- Dates: 24 January – 13 December 2023
- Teams: 64

Final positions
- Champions: Estudiantes (LP) (1st title)
- Runners-up: Defensa y Justicia
- 2024 Copa Libertadores: Estudiantes (LP)

Tournament statistics
- Matches played: 63
- Goals scored: 149 (2.37 per match)
- Top goal scorer(s): Gabriel Ávalos; Enzo Ariel Fernández; Miguel Merentiel (3 goals each)

Awards
- Best player: José Sosa

The 2023 Copa Argentina (officially the Copa Argentina AXION energy 2023 for sponsorship reasons) was the thirteenth edition of the Copa Argentina football tournament, and the eleventh since the relaunch of the tournament in 2011. The competition began on 24 January and ended on 13 December 2023. Patronato, the defending champions, were eliminated in the round of 32.

Estudiantes (LP) defeated Defensa y Justicia 1–0 in the final to win their first title in the tournament. As winners, they qualified for the 2024 Copa Libertadores group stage and earned the right to play against the winners of the 2023 Argentine Primera División in the 2023 Supercopa Argentina.

== Teams ==
Sixty-four teams took part in this competition: All twenty-eight teams from the Primera División; fifteen teams of the Primera Nacional; five from the Primera B, four from the Primera C; two from the Primera D and ten teams from Federal A.

=== First Level ===
==== Primera División ====
All twenty-eight teams of the 2022 tournament qualified.

- Aldosivi
- Argentinos Juniors
- Arsenal
- Atlético Tucumán
- Banfield
- Barracas Central
- Boca Juniors
- Central Córdoba (SdE)
- Colón
- Defensa y Justicia
- Estudiantes (LP)
- Gimnasia y Esgrima (LP)
- Godoy Cruz
- Huracán
- Independiente
- Lanús
- Newell's Old Boys
- Patronato^{TH}
- Platense
- Racing
- River Plate
- Rosario Central
- San Lorenzo
- Sarmiento (J)
- Talleres (C)
- Tigre
- Unión
- Vélez Sarsfield

=== Second Level ===
==== Primera Nacional ====
The top fifteen teams of the 2022 tournament qualified.

- All Boys
- Almagro
- Belgrano
- Chacarita Juniors
- Chaco For Ever
- Defensores de Belgrano
- Deportivo Morón
- Deportivo Riestra
- Estudiantes (BA)
- Estudiantes (RC)
- Gimnasia y Esgrima (M)
- Independiente Rivadavia
- Instituto
- San Martín (SJ)
- San Martín (T)

=== Third Level ===
==== Primera B Metropolitana ====
The champion and the top three teams of the 2022 Primera B tournament and the winner of "2021 Torneo Complemento" qualified.

- Colegiales
- Comunicaciones
- Defensores Unidos
- Deportivo Armenio
- Ituzaingó

==== Torneo Federal A ====
The top five teams of each zone of the 2022 tournament qualified.

- Central Norte
- Ciudad de Bolívar
- Gimnasia y Tiro
- Independiente (Ch)
- Olimpo
- Racing (C)
- San Martín (F)
- Sarmiento (R)
- Sol de Mayo
- Villa Mitre

=== Fourth Level ===
==== Primera C Metropolitana ====
The champion and the top three teams of the 2022 Primera C tournament qualified.

- Argentino (M)
- Claypole
- Deportivo Español
- Excursionistas

=== Fifth Level ===
==== Primera D Metropolitana ====
The top team of 2022 Primera D tournament and the winner of "Torneo Complemento" qualified.

- Centro Español
- Yupanqui

== Round and draw dates ==
Phase	Round	Draw date	Dates
Final stage	Round of 64	3 November 2022	24 January–27 June 2023
Final stage	Round of 32	3 November 2022	19 July–15 August 2023
Final stage	Round of 16	3 November 2022	23 August–10 September 2023
Final stage	Quarterfinals	3 November 2022	10–15 October 2023
Final stage	Semifinals	3 November 2022	22–23 November 2023
Final stage	Final	3 November 2022	13 December 2023

== Final rounds ==
=== Draw ===
The draw for the final rounds was held on 3 November 2022, 17:00 at AFA Futsal Stadium in Ezeiza. The 64 qualified teams were divided in four groups. Teams were seeded by their historical performance and division. Champions of AFA tournaments playing in Argentine Primera División were allocated to Group A. The matches were drawn from the respective confronts: A vs. C; B vs. D. Some combinations were avoided for security reasons.

Group A	Group B	Group C	Group D
Argentinos Juniors; Arsenal; Banfield; Boca Juniors; Colón; Estudiantes (LP); Gimnasia y Esgrima (LP); Huracán; Independiente; Lanús; Newell's Old Boys; Patronato; Racing; River Plate; Rosario Central; San Lorenzo; Tigre; Vélez Sarsfield	Aldosivi; Atlético Tucumán; Barracas Central; Belgrano; Central Córdoba (SdE); Defensa y Justicia; Gimnasia y Esgrima (M); Godoy Cruz; Instituto; Platense; San Martín (T); Sarmiento (J); Talleres (C); Unión	Argentino (M)^{[1]}; Central Norte; Centro Español^{[1]}; Ciudad de Bolívar; Claypole^{[1]}; Deportivo Español; Excursionistas; Gimnasia y Tiro; Independiente (Ch); Olimpo; Racing (C); San Martín (F); Sarmiento (R); Sol de Mayo; Villa Mitre; Yupanqui	All Boys; Almagro; Chacarita Juniors; Chaco For Ever; Colegiales; Comunicaciones; Defensores de Belgrano; Defensores Unidos ^{[1]}; Deportivo Armenio; Deportivo Morón; Deportivo Riestra; Estudiantes (BA); Estudiantes (RC); Independiente Rivadavia; Ituzaingó; San Martín (SJ)

^{1} The draw was held before the identities of Primera B champions (Defensores Unidos), Primera C champions (Argentino (M)), Primera C (4) (Claypole) and Primera D Torneo Complemento champions (Centro Español) were known.

=== Bracket ===
==== Upper bracket ====
Round of 64
River Plate	3
Racing (C)	0
Talleres (C)	2
Chacarita Juniors	0
Colón	2
Colegiales	0
Lanús	3
Sol de Mayo	1
Gimnasia y Esgrima (LP)	1 (5)
Excursionistas (p)	1 (6)
Unión	1 (3)
Almagro (p)	1 (4)
Barracas Central	1
Estudiantes (BA)	0
Boca Juniors	2
Olímpo	1
Racing	3
San Martín (F)	1
San Martín (T)	2
Deportivo Morón	0
Instituto	2
Deportivo Riestra	1
Huracán	4
Yupanqui	1
Independiente	3
Ciudad de Bolívar	0
Central Córdoba (SdE)	3
Comunicaciones	0
Gimnasia y Esgrima (M)	0 (2)
All Boys (p)	0 (4)
Estudiantes (LP)	3
Independiente (Ch)	0

Round of 32
River Plate	0
Talleres (C)	1
Colón	2
Lanús	0
Excursionistas	1
Almagro	4
Barracas Central	1
Boca Juniors	2
Racing	2
San Martín (T)	1
Instituto	0
Huracán	2
Independiente (p)	0 (7)
Central Córdoba (SdE)	0 (6)
All Boys	0
Estudiantes (LP)	1

Round of 16
Talleres (C) (p)	2 (3)
Colón	2 (1)
Almagro	2 (3)
Boca Juniors (p)	2 (4)
Racing	3
Huracán	5
Independiente	1 (1)
Estudiantes (LP) (p)	1 (3)

Quarterfinals
Talleres (C)	1 (1)
Boca Juniors (p)	1 (4)
Huracán	0
Estudiantes (LP)	2

Semifinals
Boca Juniors	2
Estudiantes (LP)	3

==== Lower bracket ====
Round of 64
Arsenal	1 (6)
Villa Mitre (p)	1 (7)
Godoy Cruz	3
Defensores Unidos	1
Sarmiento (J)	0 (5)
Chaco For Ever (p)	0 (6)
Rosario Central	4
Central Norte	1
Banfield	3
Argentino (M)	0
Atlético Tucumán	1
Estudiantes (RC)	3
Defensa y Justicia	3
Ituzaingó	2
Tigre	1 (4)
Centro Español (p)	1 (5)
San Lorenzo	3
Sarmiento (R)	0
Platense	2
Defensores de Belgrano	0
Belgrano	2
Independiente Rivadavia	0
Newell's Old Boys	0
Claypole	1
Patronato	2
Gimnasia y Tiro	0
Argentinos Juniors	3
Deportivo Armenio	0
Aldosivi	0
San Martín (SJ)	1
Vélez Sarsfield	5
Deportivo Español	1

Round of 32
Villa Mitre (p)	0 (4)
Godoy Cruz	0 (2)
Chaco For Ever	1
Rosario Central	0
Banfield	0
Estudiantes (RC)	1
Defensa y Justicia	1
Centro Español	0
San Lorenzo (p)	0 (4)
Platense	0 (3)
Belgrano	1
Claypole	0
Patronato	1
Argentinos Juniors	2
San Martín (SJ) (p)	2 (5)
Vélez Sarsfield	2 (4)

Round of 16
Villa Mitre	0 (3)
Chaco For Ever (p)	0 (4)
Estudiantes (RC)	0 (5)
Defensa y Justicia (p)	0 (6)
San Lorenzo	1
Belgrano	0
Argentinos Juniors	0
San Martín (SJ)	1

Quarterfinals
Chaco For Ever	1 (6)
Defensa y Justicia (p)	1 (7)
San Lorenzo	1
San Martín (SJ)	0

Semifinals
Defensa y Justicia	1
San Lorenzo	0

=== Round of 64 ===
The Round of 64 had 10 qualified teams from the Torneo Federal A, 11 qualified teams from the Metropolitan Zone (5 teams from Primera B Metropolitana; 4 teams from Primera C Metropolitana and 2 teams from Primera D Metropolitana), 15 teams from Primera Nacional and 28 teams from Primera División. The round was played between 24 January and 27 June 2023, in a single knock-out match format. The 32 winning teams advanced to the Round of 32.

8 March 2023	River Plate	3–0	Racing (C)	Santiago del Estero, Pcia. de Santiago del Estero
21:10	Borja 44'; Beltrán 57'; González Pírez 68'	Report		Stadium: Único Madre de Ciudades; Referee: Sebastián Zunino

7 June 2023	Vélez Sarsfield	5–1	Deportivo Español	Quilmes, Pcia. de Buenos Aires
19:40	Prestianni 20'; Brizuela 30'; Cabrera 33'; Janson 37', 50'	Report	Yossini 58'	Stadium: Centenario Ciudad de Quilmes; Referee: Franco Acita

2 May 2023	Arsenal	1–1 (6–7 p)	Villa Mitre	Junín, Pcia. de Buenos Aires
17:10	Toloza 76' (pen.)	Report	Jara 43'	Stadium: Eva Perón; Referee: Adrián Franklin
	Penalties
	Leal (penalty missed); Peña Biafore (penalty scored); Vega (penalty scored); Guzmán (penalty scored); Toloza (penalty scored); Breitenbruch (penalty scored); Souto (penalty scored); Peinipil (penalty missed)		(penalty scored) Tunessi; (penalty scored) Manchafico; (penalty scored) González Gatica; (penalty missed) Mancinelli; (penalty scored) Peralta; (penalty scored) López; (penalty scored) Dauwalder; (penalty scored) Moyano

8 February 2023	Estudiantes (LP)	3–0	Independiente (Ch)	Quilmes, Pcia. de Buenos Aires
18:45	Méndez 37'; Guasone 41'; Boselli 89'	Report		Stadium: Centenario Ciudad de Quilmes; Referee: Nazareno Arasa

22 February 2023	Racing	3–1	San Martín (F)	Resistencia, Chaco
21:40	Opazo 42'; G. Rojas 85'; Guerrero 89'	Report	Chiquichano 1'	Stadium: Centenario; Referee: Nicolás Ramírez

8 February 2023	Tigre	1–1 (4–5 p)	Centro Español	Morón, Pcia. de Buenos Aires
21:15	Badaloni 1'	Report	Senn 55'	Stadium: Nuevo Francisco Urbano; Referee: Sebastián Zunino
	Penalties
	Retegui (penalty missed); Colidio (penalty scored); Flores (penalty scored); Castro (penalty scored); Zabala (penalty scored); Montoya (penalty missed)		(penalty scored) Ramasco; (penalty scored) Gayoso; (penalty scored) Ponce; (penalty scored) Ruiz; (penalty missed) Benítez; (penalty scored) Pellico

15 March 2023	San Lorenzo	3–0	Sarmiento (R)	Santa Fe, Pcia. de Santa Fe
21:00	Pérez 22'; Blandi 44', 52'	Report		Stadium: Brigadier General Estanislao López; Referee: Nicolás Ramírez

25 March 2023	Boca Juniors	2–1	Olimpo	Resistencia, Chaco
19:00	Sández 35'; Benedetto 77' (pen.)	Report	Hadad 89'	Stadium: Centenario; Referee: Lucas Comesaña

22 February 2023	Gimnasia y Esgrima (LP)	1–1 (5–6 p)	Excursionistas	Florencio Varela, Pcia. de Buenos Aires
17:00	Lescano 53'	Report	Barrios 75'	Stadium: Norberto "Tito" Tomaghello; Referee: Fernando Espinoza
	Penalties
	Enrique (penalty scored); Contín (penalty missed); Ramírez (penalty missed); Lescano (penalty scored); Morales (penalty scored); Napolitano (penalty scored); Melluso (penalty scored); Domínguez (penalty missed)		(penalty missed) Billordo; (penalty scored) Barrios; (penalty scored) F. González; (penalty scored) Puleio; (penalty missed) Mateo; (penalty scored) Ferraro; (penalty scored) Piedra; (penalty scored) Bembo

22 February 2023	Newell's Old Boys	0–1	Claypole	San Nicolás de los Arroyos, Pcia. de Buenos Aires
19:20		Report	Llodrá 48'	Stadium: Único de San Nicolás; Referee: Rodrigo Rivero

19 June 2023	Banfield	3–0	Argentino (M)	La Plata, Pcia. de Buenos Aires
17:05	Digiano 19' (o.g.); Giménez 39', 66'	Report		Stadium: Único Diego Armando Maradona; Referee: Germán Delfino

1 February 2023	Huracán	4–1	Yupanqui	Caseros, Pcia. de Buenos Aires
21:30	Garro 25'; Cordero 39'; Cóccaro 70' (pen.); Hezze 84'	Report	Paulides 41'	Stadium: Ciudad de Caseros; Referee: Lucas Comesaña

26 March 2023	Independiente	3–0	Ciudad de Bolívar	La Plata, Pcia. de Buenos Aires
18:00	Cauteruccio 15'; Vallejo 65'; Giménez Rojas 88'	Report		Stadium: Único Diego Armando Maradona; Referee: Ariel Penel

24 May 2023	Rosario Central	4–1	Central Norte	San Nicolás de los Arroyos, Pcia. de Buenos Aires
16:00	Campaz 41'; Suraci 63' (o.g.); Mallo 81'; Cortez 90+2'	Report	Vella 30'	Stadium: Único de San Nicolás; Referee: Julio Barraza

24 January 2023	Patronato	2–0	Gimnasia y Tiro	Santa Fe, Pcia. de Santa Fe
19:40	C. González 65'; Russo 83'	Report		Stadium: Brigadier General Estanislao López; Referee: Nazareno Arasa

11 May 2023	Lanús	3–1	Sol de Mayo	Caseros, Pcia. de Buenos Aires
20:05	Lema 3'; Esquivel 27'; Sand 44'	Report	Jerović 51'	Stadium: Ciudad de Caseros; Referee: Diego Ceballos

26 April 2023	Colón	2–0	Colegiales	San Nicolás de los Arroyos, Pcia. de Buenos Aires
21:30	Pierotti 6'; Arrúa 49'	Report		Stadium: Único de San Nicolás; Referee: Nicolás Ramírez

15 March 2023	Argentinos Juniors	3–0	Deportivo Armenio	La Plata, Pcia. de Buenos Aires
18:45	Ávalos 3', 51' (pen.); Verón 64'	Report		Stadium: Juan Carmelo Zerillo; Referee: Lucas Comesaña

8 March 2023	Sarmiento (J)	0–0 (5–6 p)	Chaco For Ever	Santa Fe, Pcia. de Santa Fe
17:10		Report		Stadium: Brigadier General Estanislao López; Referee: Pablo Giménez
	Penalties
	López (penalty scored); Donatti (penalty scored); Toledo (penalty scored); Quiroga (penalty scored); Quinteros (penalty scored); Melano (penalty missed)		(penalty scored) Ibarra; (penalty scored) Romero; (penalty scored) Boasso; (penalty scored) Garay; (penalty scored) Allende; (penalty scored) Maccari

24 May 2023	Central Córdoba (SdE)	3–0	Comunicaciones	La Rioja, Pcia. de La Rioja
14:00	Gamba 3', 85'; Jourdan 87'	Report		Stadium: Carlos Augusto Mercado Luna; Referee: Nazareno Arasa

7 June 2023	Instituto	2–1	Deportivo Riestra	San Salvador de Jujuy, Pcia. de Jujuy
21:45	Martínez 10', 51'	Report	Alarcón 77' (pen.)	Stadium: 23 de Agosto; Referee: Luis Lobo Medina

16 May 2023	Atlético Tucumán	1–3	Estudiantes (RC)	Santa Fe, Pcia. de Santa Fe
20:00	Ruiz Rodríguez 56'	Report	Reynaga 73', 80'; Villalba 90+2'	Stadium: Brigadier General Estanislao López; Referee: Jorge Baliño

26 April 2023	Belgrano	2–0	Independiente Rivadavia	La Rioja, Pcia. de La Rioja
15:30	Susvielles 87'; Hesar 90+4'	Report		Stadium: Carlos Augusto Mercado Luna; Referee: Luis Lobo Medina

9 May 2023	Unión	1–1 (3–4 p)	Almagro	San Nicolás de los Arroyos, Pcia. de Buenos Aires
20:05	Machuca 23'	Report	Cuello 53'	Stadium: Único de San Nicolás; Referee: Andrés Gariano
	Penalties
	Corvalán (penalty scored); Aued (penalty scored); Gordillo (penalty scored); Machuca (penalty missed); Cañete (penalty missed); Del Blanco (penalty missed)		(penalty missed) Ferreyra; (penalty scored) Schönfeld; (penalty scored) Varaldo; (penalty missed) Solé; (penalty scored) Martínez; (penalty scored) Rogoski

10 May 2023	Barracas Central	1–0	Estudiantes (BA)	Florida, Pcia. de Buenos Aires
21:10	Insúa 90+6'	Report		Stadium: Ciudad de Vicente López; Referee: Fernando Echenique

3 May 2023	Platense	2–0	Defensores de Belgrano	Quilmes, Pcia. de Buenos Aires
17:10	Sabella 62' (pen.); Quiroga 90+4'	Report		Stadium: Centenario Ciudad de Quilmes; Referee: Pablo Giménez

1 February 2023	Defensa y Justicia	3–2	Ituzaingó	La Plata, Pcia. de Buenos Aires
19:00	Fernández 8', 61'; Barbona 10'	Report	Soria 52'; Sosa 72'	Stadium: Juan Carmelo Zerillo; Referee: Luis Lobo Medina

19 April 2023	San Martín (T)	2–0	Deportivo Morón	Santa Fe, Pcia. de Santa Fe
16:10	Banegas 56'; Verón 79'	Report		Stadium: 15 de Abril; Referee: Carlos Córdoba

17 May 2023	Gimnasia y Esgrima (M)	0–0 (2–4 p)	All Boys	La Plata, Pcia. de Buenos Aires
21:10		Report		Stadium: Juan Carmelo Zerillo; Referee: Franco Acita
	Penalties
	Bersano (penalty missed); Castro (penalty scored); Olivarez (penalty scored); Nasta (penalty missed)		(penalty missed) Muñoz; (penalty scored) Zárate; (penalty scored) Bovone; (penalty scored) Pardo; (penalty scored) Gatti

27 June 2023	Godoy Cruz	3–1	Defensores Unidos	Córdoba, Pcia. de Córdoba
17:10	Arce 37'; S. Rodríguez 68'; Conechny 77'	Report	Disanto 20'	Stadium: El Gigante de Alberdi; Referee: Nazareno Arasa

14 June 2023	Aldosivi	0–1	San Martín (SJ)	Caseros, Pcia. de Buenos Aires
13:30		Report	Blanco 90+5' (pen.)	Stadium: Ciudad de Caseros; Referee: Ariel Penel

6 June 2023	Talleres (C)	2–0	Chacarita Juniors	La Rioja, Pcia. de La Rioja
14:00	Sosa 6'; Bustos 15'	Report		Stadium: Carlos Augusto Mercado Luna; Referee: Andrés Gariano

=== Round of 32 ===
This round had 32 qualified teams from the Round of 64. The round was played between 19 July and 15 August 2023, in a single knock-out match format. The 16 winning teams advanced to the Round of 16.

20 July 2023	River Plate	0–1	Talleres (C)	Mendoza, Pcia. de Mendoza
22:00		Report	Garro 42'	Stadium: Malvinas Argentinas; Referee: Fernando Rapallini

15 August 2023	Colón	2–0	Lanús	Junín, Pcia. de Buenos Aires
17:00	Galván 30'; Benítez 82'	Report		Stadium: Eva Perón; Referee: Pablo Echavarría

26 July 2023	Excursionistas	1–4	Almagro	Morón, Pcia. de Buenos Aires
18:00	Villagra 83'	Report	Alderete 27'; Fernández 37', 61', 90+3'	Stadium: Nuevo Francisco Urbano; Referee: Pablo Dóvalo

20 July 2023	Barracas Central	1–2	Boca Juniors	Santiago del Estero, Pcia. de Santiago del Estero
19:00	Puig 64'	Report	Medina 45'; Merentiel 48'	Stadium: Único Madre de Ciudades; Referee: Leandro Rey Hilfer

19 July 2023	Racing	2–1	San Martín (T)	Córdoba, Pcia. de Córdoba
21:00	Piovi 22'; Gómez 38'	Report	Dening 75'	Stadium: Mario Alberto Kempes; Referee: Pablo Echavarría

9 August 2023	Instituto	0–2	Huracán	Santa Fe, Pcia. de Santa Fe
17:30		Report	Mazzantti 38'; Gauto 77'	Stadium: Brigadier General Estanislao López; Referee: Pablo Dóvalo

15 August 2023	Independiente	0–0 (7–6 p)	Central Córdoba (SdE)	Córdoba, Pcia. de Córdoba
21:30		Report		Stadium: Mario Alberto Kempes; Referee: Fernando Echenique
	Penalties
	Cauteruccio (penalty scored); Costa (penalty scored); Giménez Rojas (penalty scored); Elizalde (penalty scored); Báez (penalty scored); Sayago (penalty missed); Pozzo (penalty scored); K. López (penalty scored)		(penalty scored) Pittón; (penalty scored) Canto; (penalty scored) Valdez; (penalty scored) Angelini; (penalty scored) Rodríguez; (penalty missed) Soraire; (penalty scored) Mansilla; (penalty missed) Álvez

25 July 2023	All Boys	0–1	Estudiantes (LP)	Quilmes, Pcia. de Buenos Aires
15:30		Report	Méndez 38'	Stadium: Centenario Ciudad de Quilmes; Referee: Juan Pafundi

20 July 2023	Villa Mitre	0–0 (4–2 p)	Godoy Cruz	Turdera, Pcia. de Buenos Aires
16:00		Report		Stadium: Alfredo Beranger; Referee: Germán Delfino
	Penalties
	Manchafico (penalty scored); González Gatica (penalty scored); Mancinelli (penalty scored); López (penalty scored)		(penalty missed) Ramírez; (penalty scored) Conechny; (penalty scored) Abrego; (penalty missed) Fernández

2 August 2023	Chaco For Ever	1–0	Rosario Central	Córdoba, Pcia. de Córdoba
18:00	Dellarossa 87'	Report		Stadium: Mario Alberto Kempes; Referee: José Carreras

3 August 2023	Banfield	0–1	Estudiantes (RC)	La Plata, Pcia. de Buenos Aires
17:00		Report	Talpone 22'	Stadium: Único Diego Armando Maradona; Referee: Jorge Baliño

19 July 2023	Defensa y Justicia	1–0	Centro Español	La Plata, Pcia. de Buenos Aires
18:00	Bogarín 57'	Report		Stadium: Juan Carmelo Zerillo; Referee: Sebastián Martínez

26 July 2023	San Lorenzo	0–0 (4–3 p)	Platense	Lanús, Pcia. de Buenos Aires
21:10		Report		Stadium: Ciudad de Lanús – Néstor Díaz Pérez; Referee: Yael Falcón Pérez
	Penalties
	Luján (penalty missed); Martegani (penalty scored); Campi (penalty scored); Bareiro (penalty scored); Batalla (penalty scored)		(penalty scored) Rossi; (penalty missed) Taborda; (penalty scored) Servetto; (penalty scored) Marcich; (penalty missed) Martínez

3 August 2023	Belgrano	1–0	Claypole	Junín, Pcia. de Buenos Aires
21:15	Barrea 43'	Report		Stadium: Eva Perón; Referee: Julio Barraza

25 July 2023	Patronato	1–2	Argentinos Juniors	Junín, Pcia. de Buenos Aires
18:00	Russo 90+4'	Report	Verón 12'; Ávalos 35'	Stadium: Eva Perón; Referee: Silvio Trucco

20 July 2023	San Martín (SJ)	2–2 (5–4 p)	Vélez Sarsfield	Córdoba, Pcia. de Córdoba
13:45	Grahl 53'; Heredia 89'	Report	Lobato 75'; Pelaitay 76' (o.g.)	Stadium: El Gigante de Alberdi; Referee: Andrés Merlos
	Penalties
	Vega (penalty scored); Donato (penalty scored); Ludueña (penalty scored); Regalado (penalty scored); Monllor (penalty scored)		(penalty scored) Cabrera; (penalty missed) Ortega; (penalty scored) Prestianni; (penalty scored) Osorio; (penalty scored) J. Fernández

=== Round of 16 ===
This round had the 16 qualified teams from the Round of 32. The round was played between 23 August and 10 September 2023, in a single knock-out match format. The 8 winning teams advanced to the Quarterfinals.

30 August 2023	Talleres (C)	2–2 (3–1 p)	Colón	Mendoza, Pcia. de Mendoza
14:00	Sosa 57'; Benavídez 61'	Report	Galván 39'; Toledo 79'	Stadium: Malvinas Argentinas; Referee: Pablo Giménez
	Penalties
	Bustos (penalty scored); Sequeira (penalty missed); Benavídez (penalty scored); Sosa (penalty missed); Catalán (penalty scored)		(penalty missed) Toledo; (penalty scored) Meza; (penalty missed) Espínola; (penalty missed) Nardelli

10 September 2023	Almagro	2–2 (3–4 p)	Boca Juniors	La Rioja, Pcia. de La Rioja
17:30	Silvera 58'; Maidana 74'	Report	Bullaude 25'; Blondel 45'	Stadium: Carlos Augusto Mercado Luna; Referee: Luis Lobo Medina
	Penalties
	Basualdo (penalty missed); Ferreyra (penalty scored); Achucarro (penalty scored); Conechny (penalty scored); Maidana (penalty missed)		(penalty scored) Zeballos; (penalty scored) Benedetto; (penalty missed) Merentiel; (penalty scored) Figal; (penalty scored) Rojo

9 September 2023	Racing	3–5	Huracán	Córdoba, Pcia. de Córdoba
20:10	Oroz 26'; Romero 52', 57'	Report	Carrizo 6'; Souto 21'; Benítez 40'; Fértoli 46'; Pussetto 67'	Stadium: Mario Alberto Kempes; Referee: Fernando Echenique

9 September 2023	Independiente	1–1 (1–3 p)	Estudiantes (LP)	Mendoza, Pcia. de Mendoza
15:15	González 29'	Report	F. Fernández 36'	Stadium: Malvinas Argentinas; Referee: Andrés Merlos
	Penalties
	Mancuello (penalty scored); Giménez Rojas (penalty missed); Laso (penalty missed); Canelo (penalty missed)		(penalty scored) Sosa; (penalty scored) Benedetti; (penalty scored) Mancuso

23 August 2023	Villa Mitre	0–0 (3–4 p)	Chaco For Ever	Quilmes, Pcia. de Buenos Aires
14:00		Report		Stadium: Centenario Ciudad de Quilmes; Referee: Brian Ferreyra
	Penalties
	Manchafico (penalty scored); González Gatica (penalty scored); Peralta (penalty missed); Mancinelli (penalty scored); López (penalty missed)		(penalty scored) Díaz; (penalty scored) Allende; (penalty scored) Romero; (penalty scored) Bruno

6 September 2023	Estudiantes (RC)	0–0 (5–6 p)	Defensa y Justicia	Santa Fe, Pcia. de Santa Fe
21:10		Report		Stadium: Brigadier General Estanislao López; Referee: Nazareno Arasa
	Penalties
	Maffini (penalty scored); Valiente (penalty scored); Flores (penalty scored); Leyes (penalty scored); Reynaga (penalty scored); Castet (penalty missed)		(penalty scored) Cardona; (penalty scored) Ríos; (penalty scored) Barbona; (penalty scored) Sant'Anna; (penalty scored) Pratto; (penalty scored) Bogarín

30 August 2023	San Lorenzo	1–0	Belgrano	Santa Fe, Pcia. de Santa Fe
18:30	Girotti 10'	Report		Stadium: Brigadier General Estanislao López; Referee: Sebastián Zunino

30 August 2023	Argentinos Juniors	0–1	San Martín (SJ)	Córdoba, Pcia. de Córdoba
16:15		Report	Vega 87'	Stadium: El Gigante de Alberdi; Referee: Luis Lobo Medina

=== Quarterfinals ===
This round had the 8 qualified teams from the Round of 16. The round was played between 10 and 15 October 2023, in a single knock-out match format. The 4 winning teams advanced to the Semifinals.

15 October 2023	Talleres (C)	1–1 (1–4 p)	Boca Juniors	Mendoza, Pcia. de Mendoza
21:10	Benavídez 22'	Report	Cavani 57' (pen.)	Stadium: Malvinas Argentinas; Referee: Fernando Echenique
	Penalties
	Bustos (penalty missed); Barrera (penalty scored); Benavídez (penalty missed)		(penalty scored) Benedetto; (penalty scored) Figal; (penalty scored) Cavani; (penalty scored) Barco

13 October 2023	Huracán	0–2	Estudiantes (LP)	Rosario, Pcia. de Santa Fe
17:00		Report	Souto 11' (o.g.); Ascacíbar 41'	Stadium: Marcelo Bielsa; Referee: Nicolás Ramírez

11 October 2023	Chaco For Ever	1–1 (6–7 p)	Defensa y Justicia	Santa Fe, Pcia. de Santa Fe
21:10	Dellarossa 68'	Report	Togni 66'	Stadium: 15 de Abril; Referee: Fabricio Llobet
	Penalties
	Fernández (penalty scored); Allende (penalty scored); Iritier (penalty scored); Villagra (penalty missed); Monteseirín (penalty scored); Bayk (penalty scored); Nievas (penalty scored); Barbieri (penalty missed)		(penalty scored) Cardona; (penalty missed) Ríos; (penalty scored) Castellani; (penalty scored) Barbona; (penalty scored) Pratto; (penalty scored) Bogarín; (penalty scored) Soto; (penalty scored) Tripichio

10 October 2023	San Lorenzo	1–0	San Martín (SJ)	La Punta, Pcia. de San Luis
17:00	Girotti 34' (pen.)	Report		Stadium: Provincial Juan Gilberto Funes; Referee: Fernando Espinoza

=== Semifinals ===
This round had the 4 qualified teams from the Quarter-finals. The round was played on 22 and 23 November 2023, in a single knock-out match format. The 2 winning teams advanced to the Final.

22 November 2023	Boca Juniors	2–3	Estudiantes (LP)	Córdoba, Pcia. de Córdoba
21:10	Merentiel 28', 43'	Report	Carrillo 2'; Boselli 46'; Figal 64' (o.g.)	Stadium: Mario Alberto Kempes; Referee: Yael Falcón Pérez

23 November 2023	Defensa y Justicia	1–0	San Lorenzo	Lanús, Pcia. de Buenos Aires
21:10	Solari 33'	Report		Stadium: Ciudad de Lanús – Néstor Díaz Pérez; Referee: Pablo Dóvalo

=== Final ===
13 December 2023
21:10

Estudiantes (LP)	1–0	Defensa y Justicia
Carrillo 53'	Report

Ciudad de Lanús – Néstor Díaz Pérez, Lanús
Referee: Nicolás Ramírez

== Top goalscorers ==
Rank	Player	Club	Goals
1	(Paraguay) Gabriel Ávalos	Argentinos Juniors	3
1	(Argentina) Enzo Ariel Fernández	Almagro	3
1	(Uruguay) Miguel Merentiel	Boca Juniors	3
4	(Argentina) Gastón Benavídez	Talleres (C)	2
4	(Argentina) Nicolás Blandi	San Lorenzo	2
4	(Argentina) Mauro Boselli	Estudiantes (LP)	2
4	(Argentina) Guido Carrillo	Estudiantes (LP)	2
4	(Argentina) Jonathan Dellarossa	Chaco For Ever	2
4	(Argentina) Nicolás Fernández	Defensa y Justicia	2
4	(Argentina) Tomás Galván	Colón	2
4	(Argentina) Lucas Gamba	Central Córdoba (SdE)	2
4	(Argentina) Milton Giménez	Banfield	2
4	(Argentina) Federico Girotti	San Lorenzo	2
4	(Argentina) Lucas Janson	Vélez Sarsfield	2
4	(Argentina) Adrián Martínez	Instituto	2
4	(Uruguay) Mauro Méndez	Estudiantes (LP)	2
4	(Argentina) Renzo Reynaga	Estudiantes (RC)	2
4	(Argentina) Maximiliano Romero	Racing	2
4	(Argentina) Ignacio Russo	Patronato	2
4	(Paraguay) Ramón Sosa	Talleres (C)	2
4	(Argentina) Gastón Verón	Argentinos Juniors	2

Source: Copa Argentina

== Team of the tournament ==
Team
Goalkeeper	Defenders	Midfielders	Forwards
Enrique Bologna (Defensa y Justicia)	Eros Mancuso (Estudiantes (LP)); Rafa Pérez (San Lorenzo); Tomás Cardona (Defensa y Justicia)	Alexis Vega (San Martín (SJ)); José Sosa (Estudiantes (LP)); Enzo Ariel Fernández (Almagro); Gastón Togni (Defensa y Justicia)	Jonathan Dellarossa (Chaco For Ever); Guido Carrillo (Estudiantes (LP)); Miguel Merentiel (Boca Juniors)
Substitutes
Luciano Silva (Chaco For Ever); Augusto Batalla (San Lorenzo)	Leonardo Godoy (Estudiantes (LP)); Gastón Benavídez (Talleres (C))	Cristian Medina (Boca Juniors); Tomás Galván (Colón)	Ramón Sosa (Talleres (C)); Gabriel Ávalos (Argentinos Juniors); Nicolás Fernández (Defensa y Justicia); Federico Girotti (San Lorenzo); Mauro Boselli (Estudiantes (LP)); Mauro Méndez (Estudiantes (LP))
Coach
Eduardo Domínguez (Estudiantes (LP))

Source: Copa Argentina

== See also ==
- 2023 Argentine Primera División
- 2023 Copa de la Liga Profesional
