= 2023 Copa Argentina final =

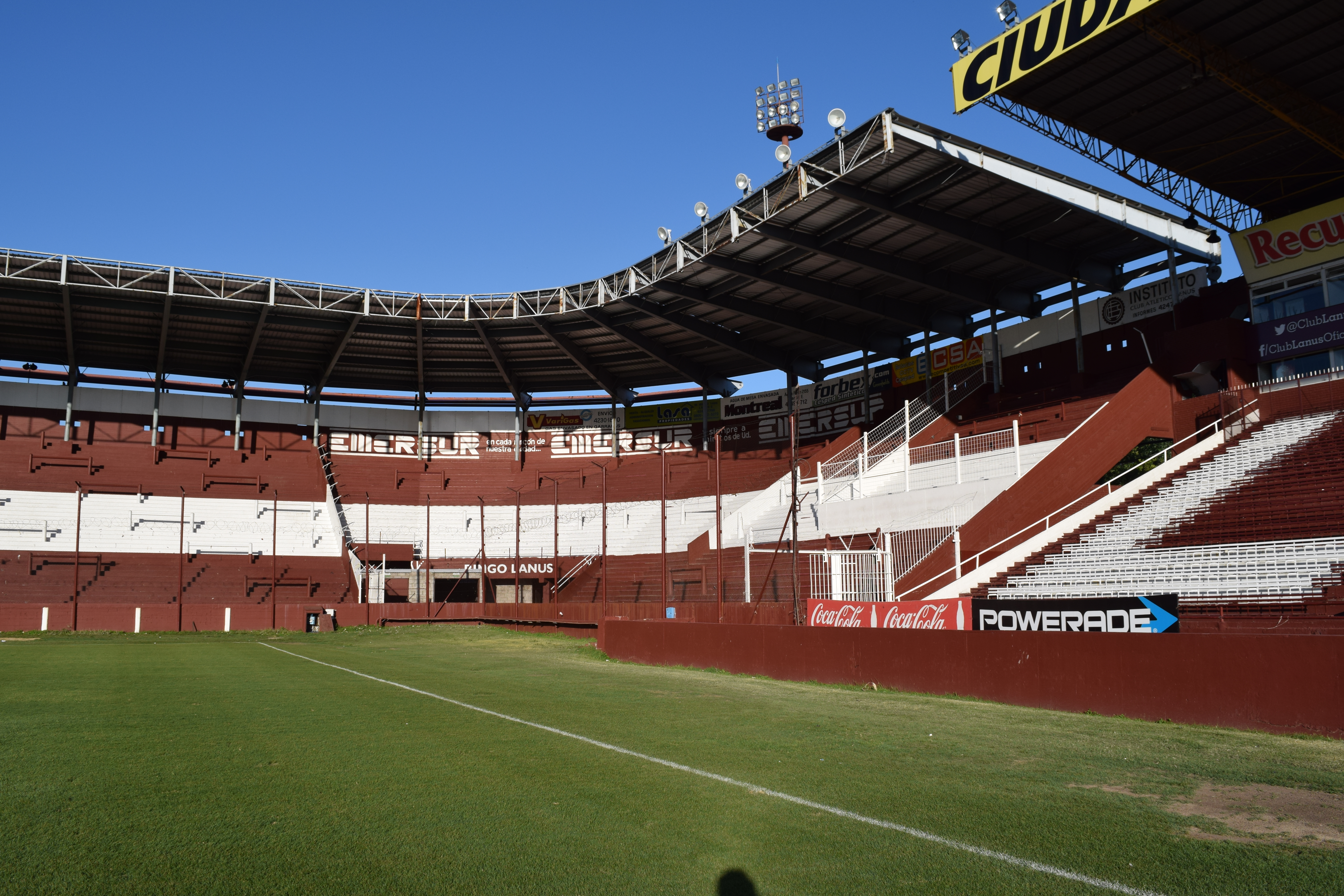
- Estadio Ciudad de Lanús – Néstor Díaz Pérez, venue
- Event: 2023 Copa Argentina
Estudiantes (LP)	Defensa y Justicia
1	0
- Date: 13 December 2023
- Venue: Estadio Ciudad de Lanús – Néstor Díaz Pérez, Lanús
- Man of the Match: Leonardo Godoy (Estudiantes (LP))
- Referee: Nicolás Ramírez

The 2023 Copa Argentina final was the 63rd and final match of the 2023 Copa Argentina. It was played on 13 December 2023 at Estadio Ciudad de Lanús – Néstor Díaz Pérez in Lanús between Estudiantes (LP) and Defensa y Justicia.

Estudiantes (LP) defeated Defensa y Justicia by a 1–0 score to win their first title in the tournament. As winners, they qualified for the 2024 Copa Libertadores group stage and earned the right to play against the winners of the 2023 Argentine Primera División in the 2023 Supercopa Argentina.

== Qualified teams ==
Team	Previous finals app.
Estudiantes (LP)	None
Defensa y Justicia	None

Bold indicates winning years

== Road to the final ==
Estudiantes (LP)			Round	Defensa y Justicia		
Opponent	Venue	Score		Opponent	Venue	Score
Independiente (Ch)	Quilmes	3–0	Round of 64	Ituzaingó	La Plata	3–2
All Boys	Quilmes	1–0	Round of 32	Centro Español	La Plata	1–0
Independiente	Mendoza	1–1 (3–1 p)	Round of 16	Estudiantes (RC)	Santa Fe	0–0 (6–5 p)
Huracán	Rosario	2–0	Quarter-finals	Chaco For Ever	Santa Fe	1–1 (7–6 p)
Boca Juniors	Córdoba	3–2	Semi-finals	San Lorenzo	Lanús	1–0

== Match details ==
13 December 2023
21:10

Estudiantes (LP)	1–0	Defensa y Justicia
Carrillo 53'	Report

Estadio Ciudad de Lanús – Néstor Díaz Pérez, Lanús
Referee: Nicolás Ramírez

**Estudiantes (LP)**	**Defensa y Justicia**

GK	21	(Argentina) Mariano Andújar (c)
DF	29	(Argentina) Leonardo Godoy
DF	4	(Argentina) Santiago Núñez
DF	2	(Argentina) Zaid Romero
DF	14	(Argentina) Eros Mancuso	(yellow card) 82'	(substituted off) 88'
MF	30	(Argentina) Jorge Rodríguez
MF	8	(Argentina) Fernando Zuqui
MF	7	(Argentina) José Sosa	(yellow card) 68'	(substituted off) 78'
MF	10	(Argentina) Benjamín Rollheiser		(substituted off) 71'
MF	15	(Argentina) Franco Zapiola		(substituted off) 46'
FW	9	(Argentina) Guido Carrillo	(yellow card) 71'	(substituted off) 71'
Substitutes:
GK	1	(Argentina) Fabricio Iacovich
DF	6	(Argentina) Ezequiel Muñoz
DF	13	(Argentina) Gastón Benedetti		(substituted on) 88'
DF	26	(Argentina) Luciano Lollo
DF	32	(Argentina) Federico Fernández		(substituted on) 78'
MF	5	(Argentina) Santiago Ascacíbar		(substituted on) 71'
MF	19	(Colombia) Alexis Manyoma
MF	40	(Argentina) Axel Atum
MF	47	(Chile) Javier Altamirano
FW	16	(Uruguay) Mauro Méndez
FW	17	(Argentina) Mauro Boselli		(substituted on) 71'
FW	31	(Argentina) Pablo Piatti	(yellow card) 86' (yellow-red card) 90+4'	(substituted on) 46'
Manager:
(Argentina) Eduardo Domínguez

GK	23	(Argentina) Enrique Bologna
DF	32	(Uruguay) Agustín Sant'Anna
DF	2	(Argentina) Julián Malatini
DF	25	(Argentina) Tomás Cardona (c)
DF	3	(Argentina) Alexis Soto	(yellow card) 21' (yellow-red card) 84'
MF	30	(Argentina) Gonzalo Castellani		(substituted off) 67'
MF	8	(Argentina) Julián López	(yellow card) 55'	(substituted off) 83'
MF	27	(Argentina) Santiago Germán Solari	(yellow card) 15'	(substituted off) 73'
MF	19	(Argentina) David Barbona		(substituted off) 73'
MF	11	(Argentina) Gastón Togni	(yellow card) 86'
FW	29	(Argentina) Nicolás Fernández	(yellow card) 38'
Substitutes:
GK	22	(Uruguay) Cristopher Fiermarin
DF	4	(Argentina) Nicolás Tripichio
DF	14	(Argentina) Ezequiel Cannavo
DF	21	(Argentina) Santiago Ramos Mingo
DF	26	(Paraguay) Darío Cáceres
MF	7	(Argentina) Manuel Agustín Duarte
MF	10	(Paraguay) Rodrigo Bogarín		(substituted on) 67'
MF	15	(Argentina) Tomás Escalante
MF	17	(Argentina) Gabriel Alanís		(substituted on) 73'
FW	9	(Argentina) Andrés Ríos
FW	18	(Argentina) Lucas Pratto		(substituted on) 73'
FW	28	(Argentina) Lautaro Fedele		(substituted on) 83'
Manager:
(Argentina) Julio Vaccari

Man of the Match:
(Argentina) Leonardo Godoy (Estudiantes (LP))

Assistant referees:
Diego Bonfá
Ezequiel Brailovzsky
Fourth official:
Ariel Penel
Fifth official:
Mariana de Almeida

**Match rules**

- 90 minutes.
- Penalty shoot-out if scores still level.
- Twelve named substitutes.
- Maximum of five substitutions.

=== Statistics ===
Overall
	Estudiantes (LP)	Defensa y Justicia
Goals scored	1	0
Total shots	11	14
Shots on target	8	9
Ball possession	47%	53%
Corner kicks	4	0
Fouls committed	11	14
Offsides	3	1
Yellow cards	5	6
Red cards	1	1
