= 2024 Copa de la Liga Profesional final =

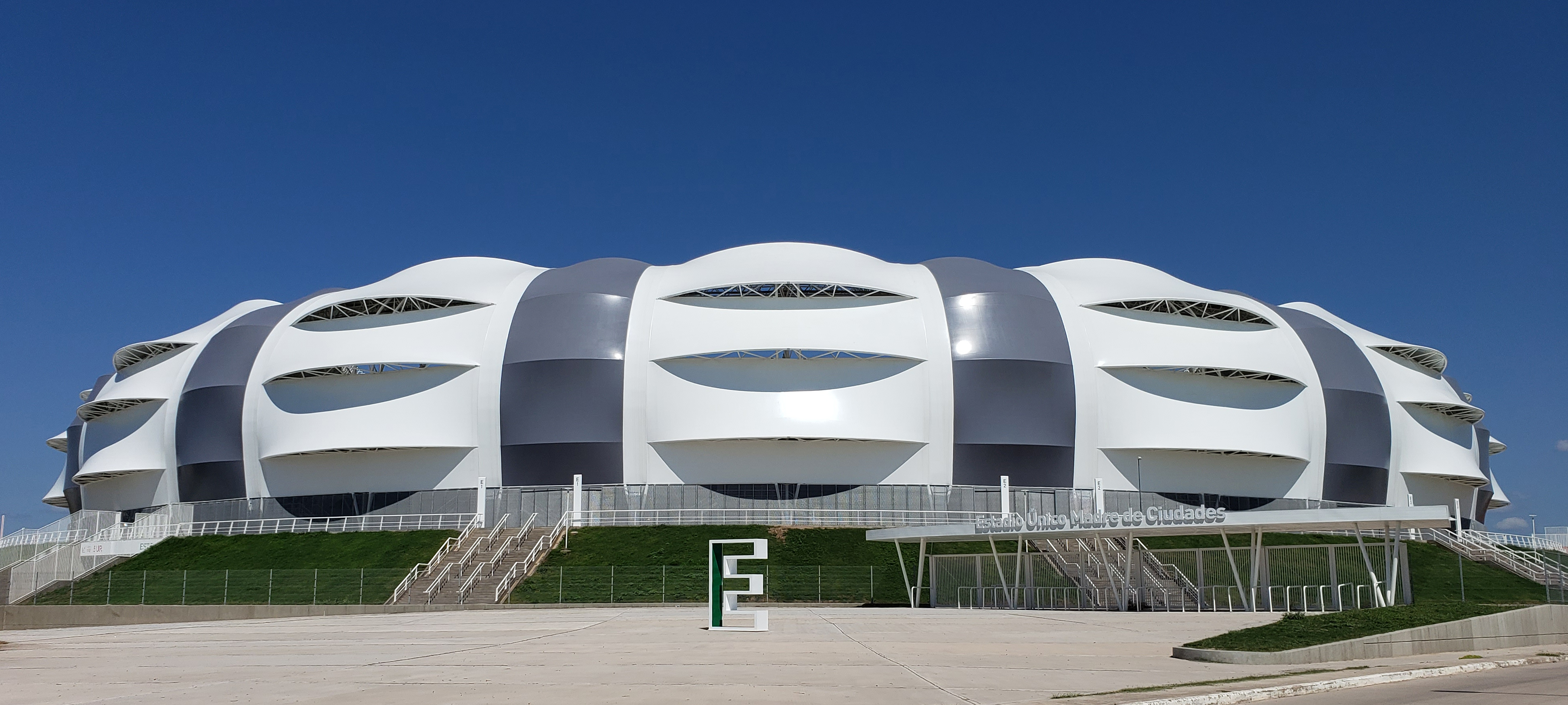
- Estadio Único Madre de Ciudades, venue
- Event: 2024 Copa de la Liga Profesional
Estudiantes (LP)	Vélez Sarsfield
1	1
- Estudiantes (LP) won 4–3 on penalties
- Date: 5 May 2024
- Venue: Único Madre de Ciudades, Santiago del Estero
- Man of the Match: Matías Mansilla (Estudiantes (LP))
- Referee: Nicolás Ramírez

The 2024 Copa de la Liga Profesional final was the final match of the 2024 Copa de la Liga Profesional, the fifth edition of this national cup. It was held in the Estadio Único Madre de Ciudades in Santiago del Estero on 5 May 2024 between Estudiantes (LP) and Vélez Sarsfield. Both clubs contested their first Copa de la Liga Profesional final.

After a 1–1 draw, Estudiantes (LP) won 4–3 on penalties to claim their first title in the tournament. As champions, Estudiantes (LP) qualified for the 2025 Copa Libertadores and the 2024 Trofeo de Campeones.

== Qualified teams ==
Team	Previous finals app.
Estudiantes (LP)	None
Vélez Sarsfield	None

Bold indicates winning years

== Road to the final ==
Note: In all results below, the score of the finalist is given first (H: home; A: away; N: neutral venue).

Estudiantes (LP)		Round	Vélez Sarsfield	
Opponent	Result	Group stage	Opponent	Result
Belgrano	1–0 (H)	Matchday 1	Barracas Central	1–1 (A)
Unión	1–0 (A)	Matchday 2	Independiente	0–1 (H)
Racing	0–0 (H)	Matchday 3	River Plate	0–5 (A)
Tigre	2–0 (H)	Matchday 4	Gimnasia y Esgrima (LP)	3–1 (H)
San Lorenzo	1–1 (A)	Matchday 5	Deportivo Riestra	2–1 (A)
Newell's Old Boys	2–0 (H)	Matchday 6	Huracán	1–0 (H)
Gimnasia y Esgrima (LP)	0–0 (A)	Matchday 7	Tigre	2–2 (H)
Godoy Cruz	2–1 (A)	Matchday 8	Atlético Tucumán	0–0 (A)
Platense	1–2 (H)	Matchday 9	Rosario Central	1–0 (H)
Sarmiento (J)	1–3 (A)	Matchday 10	Banfield	2–1 (A)
Boca Juniors	1–0 (H)	Matchday 11	Instituto	1–0 (H)
Defensa y Justicia	0–1 (A)	Matchday 12	Talleres (C)	0–1 (A)
Central Córdoba (SdE)	5–0 (H)	Matchday 13	Argentinos Juniors	0–0 (H)
Lanús	2–1 (A)	Matchday 14	Independiente Rivadavia	1–0 (A)
**Zone B runners-up**: Pos / Team / Pld / W / D / L / GF / GA / GD / Pts; 1 / Godoy Cruz / 14 / 9 / 2 / 3 / 16 / 6 / +10 / **29**; **2** / Estudiantes (LP) / **14** / **8** / **3** / **3** / **19** / **9** / **+10** / **27**; 3 / Defensa y Justicia / 14 / 7 / 5 / 2 / 17 / 13 / +4 / **26**; 4 / Boca Juniors / 14 / 7 / 4 / 3 / 20 / 12 / +8 / **25**; 5 / Racing / 14 / 7 / 3 / 4 / 24 / 11 / +13 / **24**; Source: AFA		Final standings	**Zone A 4th place**: Pos / Team / Pld / W / D / L / GF / GA / GD / Pts; 1 / River Plate / 14 / 7 / 6 / 1 / 26 / 10 / +16 / **27**; 2 / Argentinos Juniors / 14 / 7 / 5 / 2 / 25 / 14 / +11 / **26**; 3 / Barracas Central / 14 / 7 / 5 / 2 / 20 / 15 / +5 / **26**; **4** / Vélez Sarsfield / **14** / **7** / **4** / **3** / **14** / **13** / **+1** / **25**; 5 / Talleres (C) / 14 / 6 / 6 / 2 / 24 / 16 / +8 / **24**; Source: AFA	
Estudiantes (LP)		Round	Vélez Sarsfield	
Opponent	Result	Final stages	Opponent	Result
Barracas Central	3–0 (N)	Quarter-finals	Godoy Cruz	2–1 (N)
Boca Juniors	1–1 (3–1 (p)) (N)	Semi-finals	Argentinos Juniors	0–0 (4–2 (p)) (N)

== Match details ==
5 May 2024
15:30

Estudiantes (LP)	1–1 (a.e.t.)	Vélez Sarsfield
Mancuso 13'	Report	Sarco 62'
Penalties
Piatti (penalty scored); Mancuso (penalty missed); Correa (penalty scored); Cetré (penalty scored); Ascacíbar (penalty missed); Zuqui (penalty scored)	4–3	(penalty scored) Mammana; (penalty scored) Sarco; (penalty missed) García; (penalty missed) Cáseres; (penalty scored) Lobato; (penalty missed) Montoro

Estadio Único Madre de Ciudades, Santiago del Estero
Referee: Nicolás Ramírez

**Estudiantes (LP)**	**Vélez Sarsfield**

GK	12	(Argentina) Matías Mansilla
RB	14	(Argentina) Eros Mancuso
CB	26	(Argentina) Luciano Lollo
CB	2	(Argentina) Zaid Romero
LB	13	(Argentina) Gastón Benedetti	(yellow card) 28' (red card) 69'
CM	5	(Argentina) Santiago Ascacíbar	(yellow card) 51'
CM	22	(Argentina) Enzo Pérez	(yellow card) 77'	(substituted off) 86'
RM	32	(Uruguay) Tiago Palacios		(substituted off) 74'
AM	7	(Argentina) José Sosa (c)		(substituted off) 46'
LM	18	(Colombia) Edwuin Cetré	(yellow card) 90+3'
CF	9	(Argentina) Guido Carrillo		(substituted off) 73'
Substitutes:
GK	1	(Argentina) Fabricio Iacovich
GK	25	(Argentina) Juan Pablo Zozaya
DF	4	(Argentina) Santiago Flores
DF	6	(Argentina) Federico Fernández
DF	20	(Argentina) Eric Meza	(yellow card) 102'	(substituted in) 74'
MF	8	(Argentina) Fernando Zuqui		(substituted in) 46'
MF	15	(Argentina) Franco Zapiola
MF	19	(Colombia) Alexis Manyoma
MF	29	(Argentina) Axel Atum
FW	10	(Argentina) Pablo Piatti		(substituted in) 86'
FW	16	(Uruguay) Mauro Méndez
FW	27	(Argentina) Javier Correa	(yellow card) 76'	(substituted in) 73'
Manager:
(Argentina) Eduardo Domínguez

GK	1	(Argentina) Tomás Marchiori
RB	4	(Argentina) Joaquín García
CB	34	(Argentina) Damián Fernández	(yellow card) 46' (red card) 58'
CB	31	(Argentina) Valentín Gómez	(yellow card) 129'
LB	3	(Argentina) Elías Gómez	(yellow card) 33'	(substituted off) 61'
CM	32	(Argentina) Christian Ordóñez	(yellow card) 24'
CM	26	(Argentina) Agustín Bouzat		(substituted off) 98'
RM	20	(Argentina) Francisco Pizzini		(substituted off) 87'
AM	22	(Argentina) Claudio Aquino (c)		(substituted off) 87'
LM	27	(Argentina) Thiago Fernández		(substituted off) 66'
CF	18	(Uruguay) Thiago Vecino		(substituted off) 61'
Substitutes:
GK	42	(Argentina) Lautaro Garzón
DF	2	(Argentina) Emanuel Mammana		(substituted in) 61'
DF	29	(Argentina) Leonardo Jara
DF	37	(Argentina) Tomás Cavanagh		(substituted in) 66'
MF	10	(Argentina) Elías Cabrera
MF	11	(Argentina) Matías Pellegrini
MF	21	(Argentina) Ignacio Méndez
MF	35	(Argentina) Santiago Cáseres		(substituted in) 98'
MF	36	(Argentina) Álvaro Montoro		(substituted in) 87'
FW	14	(Brazil) Lenny Lobato		(substituted in) 87'
FW	17	(Uruguay) Rodrigo Piñeiro
FW	30	(Argentina) Alejo Sarco		(substituted in) 61'
Manager:
(Bolivia) Gustavo Quinteros

Man of the Match:
Matías Mansilla (Estudiantes (LP))

Assistant referees:
Maximiliano Del Yesso
Sebastián Raineri
Fourth official:
Leandro Rey Hilfer
Fifth official:
Pablo González
Video assistant referee:
Héctor Paletta
Assistant video assistant referees:
Pablo Dóvalo

**Match rules**

- 90 minutes
- 30 minutes of extra time if necessary
- Penalty shoot-out if scores still level
- Twelve named substitutes
- Maximum of five substitutions, with a sixth allowed in extra time

=== Statistics ===
Overall
	Estudiantes (LP)	Vélez Sarsfield
Goals scored	1	1
Total shots	13	18
Shots on target	7	8
Ball possession	50%	50%
Corner kicks	7	3
Fouls committed	24	15
Offsides	2	0
Yellow cards	6	4
Red cards	1	1
