= 2023 Supercopa Argentina =

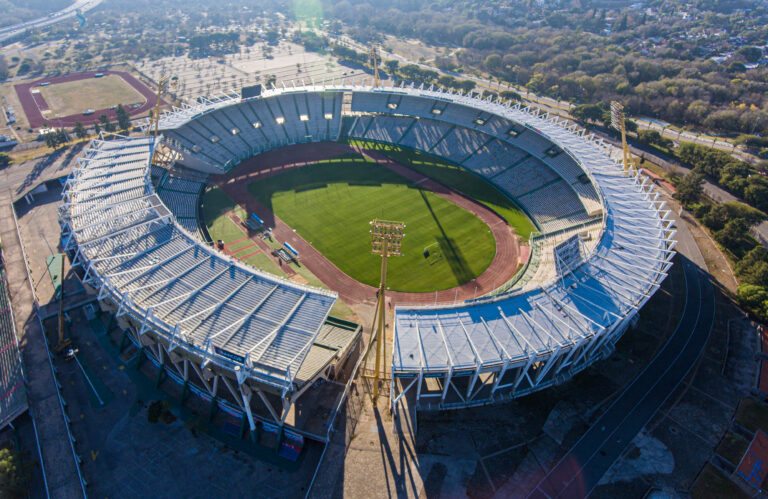
- Estadio Mario Alberto Kempes, venue
- Event: Supercopa Argentina
River Plate	Estudiantes (LP)
2	1
- Date: 13 March 2024
- Venue: Estadio Mario Alberto Kempes, Córdoba
- Man of the Match: Rodrigo Aliendro
- Referee: Yael Falcón Pérez

The 2023 Supercopa Argentina was the tenth edition of the Supercopa Argentina, an annual football match played between the winners of the Argentine Primera División and Copa Argentina. The match was contested by the 2023 Primera División champions River Plate and the 2023 Copa Argentina winners Estudiantes (LP) on 13 March 2024 at the Estadio Mario Alberto Kempes, Córdoba. River Plate were appearing in the competition for the fifth time, while Estudiantes were making their first appearance.

River Plate qualified as a result of winning the Argentine Primera División, finishing 11 points ahead of the second-placed team. Estudiantes entered the competition after winning the Copa Argentina final against Defensa y Justicia 1–0.

Watched by a crowd of 55,000, Javier Correa gave Estudiantes an early lead after scoring in the second minute of play. River Plate equalised in the 79th minute when Zaid Romero scored an own goal, and they later completed the comeback courtesy of a long-range shot from Rodrigo Aliendro in stoppage time. Following a 2–1 scoreline, River Plate secured their third Supercopa Argentina title.

== Background ==
Founded in 2012, the Supercopa Argentina was established as a contest between the Primera División champions and Copa Argentina winners, taking inspiration from its European variations. The annual football match was originally meant for the champions of the latter competition and the Copa Campeonato, which paired the Torneo Inicial and Torneo Final winners, as single tournaments with only one champion per season were not held in Argentina. The top division was later changed to have 30 teams compete during the 2015 season, effectively ending the purpose of the Copa Campeonato. From that year until 2025, whichever team won the league title qualified for the Supercopa Argentina as the league reigning champions.

== Qualified teams ==
- Note: **Bold** indicates winners

Team	Qualification	Previous appearances
River Plate	2023 Primera División champions	4 (2014, 2016, **2017**, **2019**)
Estudiantes (LP)	2023 Copa Argentina champions	None

== Match ==
=== Details ===
13 March 2024
21:10 UTC-3

River Plate	2–1	Estudiantes (LP)
Romero 79' (o.g.); Aliendro 90+1'	Report	Correa 2'

Estadio Mario Alberto Kempes, Córdoba
Referee: Yael Falcón Pérez

**River Plate**	**Estudiantes (LP)**

GK	1	(Argentina) Franco Armani (c)
RB	2	(Uruguay) Sebastián Boselli
CB	14	(Argentina) Leandro González Pírez	(yellow card) 40'	(substituted off) 46'
CB	17	(Chile) Paulo Díaz
LB	20	(Argentina) Milton Casco		(substituted off) 75'
CM	26	(Argentina) Ignacio Fernández		(substituted off) 66'
CM	5	(Argentina) Matías Kranevitter		(substituted off) 66'
RW	36	(Argentina) Pablo Solari
AM	21	(Argentina) Esequiel Barco
LW	11	(Argentina) Facundo Colidio		(substituted off) 87'
CF	9	(Colombia) Miguel Borja
Substitutes:
GK	33	(Argentina) Ezequiel Centurión
DF	6	(Paraguay) David Martínez
DF	13	(Argentina) Enzo Díaz		(substituted on) 75'
DF	15	(Argentina) Marcelo Herrera
DF	27	(Uruguay) Agustín Sant'Anna
MF	4	(Italy) Nicolás Fonseca
MF	8	(Argentina) Agustín Palavecino
MF	19	(Argentina) Claudio Echeverri		(substituted on) 66'
MF	23	(Argentina) Rodrigo Villagra	(yellow card) 87'	(substituted on) 66'
MF	29	(Argentina) Rodrigo Aliendro	(yellow card) 90+2'	(substituted on) 87'
MF	30	(Argentina) Franco Mastantuono
MF	31	(Argentina) Santiago Simón		(substituted on) 46'
Manager:
(Argentina) Martín Demichelis

GK	12	(Argentina) Matías Mansilla
RB	14	(Argentina) Eros Mancuso		(substituted off) 77'
CB	6	(Argentina) Federico Fernández
CB	2	(Argentina) Zaid Romero
LB	20	(Argentina) Eric Meza
RM	7	(Argentina) José Sosa (c)	(yellow card) 17'	(substituted off) 65'
CM	5	(Argentina) Santiago Ascacíbar
CM	22	(Argentina) Enzo Pérez		(substituted off) 77'
LM	17	(Chile) Javier Altamirano	(yellow card) 39'	(substituted off) 55'
CF	18	(Colombia) Edwuin Cetré
CF	27	(Argentina) Javier Correa		(substituted off) 65'
Substitutes:
GK	25	(Argentina) Juan Pablo Zozaya
DF	4	(Argentina) Santiago Flores		(substituted on) 77'
DF	13	(Argentina) Gastón Benedetti
DF	26	(Argentina) Luciano Lollo
MF	8	(Argentina) Fernando Zuqui	(yellow card) 67'	(substituted on) 55'
MF	15	(Argentina) Franco Zapiola
MF	19	(Colombia) Alexis Manyoma
MF	24	(Argentina) Bautista Kociubinski		(substituted on) 77'
FW	9	(Argentina) Guido Carrillo		(substituted on) 65'
FW	16	(Uruguay) Mauro Méndez
FW	23	(Argentina) Ezequiel Naya
FW	32	(Uruguay) Tiago Palacios		(substituted on) 65'
Manager:
(Argentina) Eduardo Domínguez

**Assistant referees**
Maximiliano Del Yesso
Facundo Rodríguez
**Fourth official**
Pablo Echavarría
**Fifth official**
Hugo Páez
**Video assistant referee**
Hernán Mastrángelo
**Assistant video assistant referees**
Salomé di Iorio

**Match rules**

- 90 minutes
- 30 minutes of extra time if necessary
- Penalty shoot-out if scores still level
- Twelve named substitutes, of which up to five may be used

=== Statistics ===
Overall
Statistic	River Plate	Estudiantes (LP)
Goals scored	2	1
Total shots	17	9
Shots on target	12	7
Ball possession	62%	38%
Corner kicks	12	2
Fouls committed	12	14
Offsides	0	0
Yellow cards	3	3
Red cards	0	0

2023 Supercopa Argentina winners
**River Plate**
**3rd Title**
