= Iván Pavón =

Argentine professional footballer

Personal information
- Full name: Iván Alejandro Pavón
- Date of birth: 3 April 1998 (age 28)
- Place of birth: Argentina
- Position: Defender

Senior career*
Years	Team	Apps	(Gls)
2017–2019	Barracas Central	0	(0)
2017–2018	→ Yupanqui	4	(0)
2018–2019	→ Deportivo Español	6	(0)
- * Club domestic league appearances and goals as of 01:40, 5 September 2020 (UTC)

Iván Alejandro Pavón (born 3 April 1998) is an Argentine professional footballer who plays as a defender.

== Career ==
Pavón's career began with Barracas Central. In 2017, Pavón completed a loan move to Primera D Metropolitana's Yupanqui. Four matches followed. In 2018, Pavón was loaned out for a second time - joining Deportivo Español of Primera B Metropolitana. He made his first appearances for them in November 2018 against Justo José de Urquiza and Almirante Brown, with further appearances versus Deportivo Riestra and Acassuso following across the next six months as they were relegated.

== Career statistics ==
As of 5 September 2020.

Appearances and goals by club, season and competition
Club	Season	League			Cup		League Cup		Continental		Other		Total	
Club	Season	Division	Apps	Goals	Apps	Goals	Apps	Goals	Apps	Goals	Apps	Goals	Apps	Goals
Barracas Central	2017–18	Primera B Metropolitana	0	0	0	0	—		—		0	0	0	0
Barracas Central	2018–19	Primera B Metropolitana	0	0	0	0	—		—		0	0	0	0
Barracas Central	Total		0	0	0	0	—		—		0	0	0	0
Yupanqui (loan)	2017–18	Primera D Metropolitana	4	0	0	0	—		—		0	0	4	0
Deportivo Español (loan)	2018–19	Primera B Metropolitana	4	0	0	0	—		—		0	0	4	0
Career total			8	0	0	0	—		—		0	0	8	0
