= Fabricio Iacovich =

Argentine footballer (born 2002)

Personal information
- Date of birth: 29 January 2002 (age 24)
- Place of birth: La Plata, Argentina
- Height: 1.97 m (6 ft 6 in)
- Position: Goalkeeper

Team information
- Current team: Estudiantes (LP)
- Number: 1

Youth career
- Nueva Alianza
- Estudiantes (LP)

Senior career*
Years	Team	Apps	(Gls)
2024–	Estudiantes (LP)	13	(0)

International career
2023–2024	Argentina U23	4	(0)
- * Club domestic league appearances and goals as of 17:16, 21 November 2026 (UTC)

Fabricio Iacovich (born 29 January 2002) is an Argentine footballer who plays as a goalkeeper for Estudiantes de La Plata.

He signed his first professional contract at Estudiantes in May 2022 but did not make his debut in the Argentine Primera División until December 2024, remaining on the bench as they won several trophies. He made his international debut for Argentina under-23 in October 2023 and was chosen for the 2024 Olympics, but as a reserve and did not travel.

== Early and personal life ==
Born and raised in La Plata in Buenos Aires Province, Iacovich is of Croatian descent and holds that country's passport. He is nicknamed "El Ruso" (The Russian).

When Iacovich was 13, his mother died of suicide while he was travelling with the club Nueva Alianza.

== Club career ==
Iacovich played for Nueva Alianza in amateur leagues in La Plata. After initially being rejected by Estudiantes de La Plata, they took him into their academy. In mid-2020, Italian club Roma negotiated a one-year loan with the option to sign him, but the deal fell through due to issues around his citizenship.

In May 2022, Iacovich signed his first professional contract, lasting until the end of 2024. The following March, as a regular in the reserve team and training with the first team, he added another year to the deal; he was at the time the club's fourth-choice goalkeeper, with Mariano Andújar the first. At the start of 2024, as Estudiantes were planning the future after Andújar's retirement, Iacovich's contract was extended to the end of 2026. He sat on the bench as the club won the 2023 Copa Argentina final, the 2024 Copa de la Liga Profesional final and the 2024 Trofeo de Campeones de la Liga Profesional.

On 13 December 2024, in the last fixture of the Argentine Primera División season, Iacovich made his professional debut in a 2–2 draw at home to Argentinos Juniors. He did not play a league game again until the following 22 September in a 1–0 win over Defensa y Justicia also at the Estadio Jorge Luis Hirschi, in which first-choice players were rested between the two legs of a Copa Libertadores semi-final with Brazil's Flamengo; following the 62nd-minute substitution of José Sosa, he ended the game as the club's captain.

== International career ==
In October 2023, still awaiting his professional club debut, Iacovich was called up for the first time to the Argentina under-23 team by manager Javier Mascherano, for two friendlies against Venezuela. He made his debut in the first of those games, a goalless draw on 13 October in Ezeiza. At the start of 2024, he was chosen for the CONMEBOL Pre-Olympic Tournament, but Leandro Brey played all the games of the successful qualification.

Iacovich was chosen for the 2024 Olympic tournament in France. Having failed to get senior international goalkeeper Emiliano Martínez released from Aston Villa to take part, Mascherano succeeded in getting Gerónimo Rulli cleared to play by Ajax, meaning he would be first-choice goalkeeper in the 18-man squad and Brey back-up; Iacovich was one of four emergency reserve players and did not travel.

== Honours ==
Estudiantes (LP)

- Copa Argentina: 2023
- Copa de la Liga Profesional: 2024
- Trofeo de Campeones de la Liga Profesional: 2024, 2025
- Primera División: 2025 Clausura
