= Iván Zafarana =

Argentine footballer

Personal information
- Full name: Iván Matías Zafarana
- Date of birth: 22 April 1995 (age 31)
- Place of birth: Sarandí, Argentina
- Height: 1.84 m (6 ft 0 in)
- Position: Defender

Team information
- Current team: All Boys

Youth career
- El Porvenir

Senior career*
Years	Team	Apps	(Gls)
2016–2018	El Porvenir	80	(12)
2018–2019	Deportivo Merlo	36	(1)
2019–2021	JJ Urquiza	27	(0)
2021–2023	Estudiantes BA	48	(2)
2023–2026	San Martín Tucumán	10	(0)
2024	→ Gimnasia de Jujuy (loan)	3	(0)
2025	→ Unión San Felipe (loan)	8	(0)
2025	→ All Boys (loan)	17	(0)
2026–	All Boys	5	(1)
- * Club domestic league appearances and goals as of 17:33, 25 March 2026 (UTC)

Iván Matías Zafarana (born 22 April 1995) is an Argentine footballer who plays as a defender for Argentinian club All Boys.

== Career ==
Zafarana started his career with El Porvenir in 2016, then in the Primera D, winning the league title and getting the promotion to the Primera C.

In June 2018, Zafarana signed with Deportivo Merlo. The next season, he switched to JJ Urquiza.

On 9 July 2021, Zafarana signed with Estudiantes de Buenos Aires in the Primera B Nacional.

Two seasons later, Zafarana joined San Martín de Tucumán. In the second half of 2024, he moved to Gimnasia y Esgrima de Jujuy on a one-year loan with an option to buy. For the 2025 season, he was loaned out to Chilean club Unión San Felipe.
