= Franco Quinteros =

Argentine footballer

Personal information
- Full name: Franco Agustín Quinteros
- Date of birth: 13 October 1998 (age 28)
- Place of birth: Rosario, Argentina
- Height: 1.78 m (5 ft 10 in)
- Position: Left-back

Team information
- Current team: Estudiantes BA

Youth career
- Banfield

Senior career*
Years	Team	Apps	(Gls)
2020–2025	Banfield	38	(0)
2022–2023	→ Sarmiento (loan)	24	(2)
2025–	Estudiantes BA	38	(0)
- * Club domestic league appearances and goals as of 16:06, 28 April 2026 (UTC)

Franco Agustín Quinteros (born 13 October 1998) is an Argentine professional footballer who plays as a left-back for Estudiantes BA.

== Professional career ==
On 11 June 2019, Quinteros signed his first professional contract with Banfield. Quinteros made his professional debut with Banfield in a 3-3 Argentine Primera División tie with Patronato on 26 January 2020. In June 2022, Quinteros joined Sarmiento on a one-year loan deal. On 7 January 2025, Club Atlético Estudiantes announced his signing on Instagram. He signed a one-year deal.
