= Facundo Castelli =

Argentine professional footballer

Personal information
- Date of birth: 18 February 1995 (age 31)
- Place of birth: Nono, Argentina
- Height: 1.83 m (6 ft 0 in)
- Position: Forward

Team information
- Current team: Mushuc Runa (on loan from Estudiantes BA)

Youth career
- Instituto

Senior career*
Years	Team	Apps	(Gls)
2014–2020	Instituto	60	(7)
2019–2020	→ Sarmiento (loan)	11	(0)
2021–2023	Deportivo Maipú	43	(6)
2022–	Estudiantes BA	21	(6)
2023	→ Central Córdoba (loan)	18	(1)
2023–	→ Delfín (loan)	12	(4)
2024–2025	→ Emelec (loan)	31	(9)
2026–	→ Mushuc Runa (loan)	0	(0)
- * Club domestic league appearances and goals as of 18 March 2026

Facundo Castelli (born 18 February 1995) is an Argentine professional footballer who plays as a forward for Mushuc Runa, on loan from Estudiantes BA.

== Career ==
Castelli began with Instituto. He made the first three appearances of his career throughout the 2015 Primera B Nacional, in-between seasons where he didn't feature in the league though was on the substitutes bench twice. His first professional league appearance came on 7 March 2015 against Central Córdoba, but his senior bow arrived in the preceding July versus Arsenal de Sarandí in the Copa Argentina. Castelli netted his first goal in December 2016 in a win over Gimnasia y Esgrima. The 2017–18 season saw the forward score six goals in the league, which included braces over Estudiantes and Juventud Unida respectively.

Castelli spent 2019–20 out on loan with Sarmiento. Eleven appearances followed, prior to his return to his parent club. In March 2021, Castelli moved to Primera Nacional club Deportivo Maipú. In June 2022, Castelli joined Estudiantes de Buenos Aires on loan until 31 December 2023, free of charge and with a purchase option.

== Career statistics ==
As of 18 July 2020.

Club statistics
Club	Season	League			Cup		League Cup		Continental		Other		Total	
Club	Season	Division	Apps	Goals	Apps	Goals	Apps	Goals	Apps	Goals	Apps	Goals	Apps	Goals
Instituto	2014	Primera B Nacional	0	0	1	0	—		—		0	0	1	0
Instituto	2015	Primera B Nacional	3	0	0	0	—		—		0	0	3	0
Instituto	2016	Primera B Nacional	0	0	0	0	—		—		0	0	0	0
Instituto	2016–17	Primera B Nacional	26	1	0	0	—		—		0	0	26	1
Instituto	2017–18	Primera B Nacional	15	6	1	0	—		—		1 (Note: Appearance(s) in the Primera B Nacional play-offs)	0	17	6
Instituto	2018–19	Primera B Nacional	13	0	0	0	—		—		0	0	13	0
Instituto	2019–20	Primera B Nacional	0	0	0	0	—		—		0	0	0	0
Instituto	Total		57	7	2	0	—		—		1	0	60	7
Sarmiento (loan)	2019–20	Primera B Nacional	11	0	0	0	—		—		0	0	11	0
Career total			68	7	2	0	—		—		1	0	71	7
