= Lautaro Lusnig =

Argentine professional footballer

Personal information
- Full name: Lautaro Cruz Lusnig
- Date of birth: 14 October 1998 (age 28)
- Place of birth: Buenos Aires, Argentina
- Height: 1.78 m (5 ft 10 in)
- Position: Centre-back

Team information
- Current team: Deportivo Táchira
- Number: 3

Youth career
- All Boys

Senior career*
Years	Team	Apps	(Gls)
2018–2021	All Boys	39	(0)
2022–2025	Estudiantes BA	90	(0)
2026–	Deportivo Táchira	4	(0)
- * Club domestic league appearances and goals as of 10 March 2026

Lautaro Cruz Lusnig (born 14 October 1998) is an Argentine professional footballer who plays as a centre-back for Venezuelan club Deportivo Táchira.

== Career ==
Lusnig started his career with All Boys. He appeared five times in the 2017–18 campaign in Primera B Nacional, including for his debut which came in a 1–1 draw against Independiente Rivadavia on 2 February. After relegation in 2017–18, Lusnig played in twelve fixtures in the first part of the subsequent Primera B Metropolitana campaign.

In January 2022, Lusnig joined Estudiantes de Buenos Aires.

== Career statistics ==
As of 12 April 2019.

Appearances and goals by club, season and competition
Club	Season	League			Cup		Continental		Other		Total	
Club	Season	Division	Apps	Goals	Apps	Goals	Apps	Goals	Apps	Goals	Apps	Goals
All Boys	2017–18	Primera B Nacional	5	0	0	0	—		0	0	5	0
All Boys	2018–19	Primera B Metropolitana	22	0	0	0	—		0	0	22	0
Career total			27	0	0	0	—		0	0	27	0
