= Juan Pablo Zozaya =

Argentine footballer

Personal information
- Full name: Juan Pablo Zozaya
- Date of birth: 13 August 2001 (age 25)
- Place of birth: Necochea, Argentina
- Height: 1.87 m (6 ft 2 in)
- Position: Goalkeeper

Team information
- Current team: Magallanes (on loan from Estudiantes LP)

Youth career
- Club Del Valle
- Rivadavia
- Independiente San Cayetano
- 2015–2023: Estudiantes LP

Senior career*
Years	Team	Apps	(Gls)
2023–	Estudiantes LP	1	(0)
2024	→ Arsenal de Sarandí (loan)	5	(0)
2025	→ Central Córdoba SdE (loan)	2	(0)
2026	→ Almagro (loan)	2	(0)
2026–	→ Magallanes (loan)	0	(0)
- * Club domestic league appearances and goals as of 2 August 2026

Juan Pablo Zozaya (born 13 August 2001) is an Argentine footballer who plays as a goalkeeper for Chilean club Magallanes on loan from Estudiantes de La Plata.

== Club career ==
Born in Necochea, Argentina, Zozaya was with clubs Del Valle, Rivadavia and Independiente de San Cayetano before joining the Estudiantes de La Plata youth ranks in 2015. As a member of them, he won the 2023 Copa Argentina and the 2024 Copa de la Liga Profesional and made his professional debut in the 3–0 home victory against Argentino de Monte Maíz on 25 January 2024 in the Copa Argentina.

In June 2024, Zozaya was loaned out to Arsenal de Sarandí in the Primera Nacional. The next two years, he was sent on loan to Central Córdoba de Santiago del Estero in the Argentine Primera División and Almagro.

In August 2026, Zozaya moved abroad and joined on loan to Chilean club Magallanes.

== Personal life ==
Juan Pablo is a distant relative of historical player for Estudiantes de La Plata, Alberto Zozaya.

== Honours ==
Estudiantes

- Copa Argentina: 2023
- Copa de la Liga Profesional: 2024
