= Alan Cantero =

Argentine footballer (born 1998)

Personal information
- Full name: Alan Martín Cantero
- Date of birth: 28 June 1998 (age 28)
- Place of birth: San Juan, Argentina
- Height: 1.84 m (6 ft 0 in)
- Position: Forward

Team information
- Current team: Godoy Cruz

Youth career
- Sportivo Peñarol

Senior career*
Years	Team	Apps	(Gls)
2016–2020	Sportivo Peñarol	32	(7)
2020–	Godoy Cruz	16	(0)
2022	→ Estudiantes BA (loan)	36	(4)
2023–2024	→ Barracas Central (loan)	51	(6)
2025	→ Alianza Lima (loan)	21	(3)
- * Club domestic league appearances and goals as of 18:11, 10 January 2025 (UTC)

Alan Martín Cantero (born 28 June 1998) is an Argentine professional footballer who plays as a centre-forward for Alianza Lima.

== Career ==
Cantero came through the youth ranks at Sportivo Peñarol. He was promoted into the Torneo Federal B club's senior set-up in 2016, making his debut in the local league at the age of eighteen. They won promotion from the newly created Torneo Regional Federal Amateur in 2019, with Cantero scoring twice in a 2–1 win over Independiente de Chivilcoy in a promotion play-off final. In Torneo Federal A, the centre-forward netted league goals against Estudiantes, Huracán Las Heras, Sol de Mayo, Sportivo Desamparados and Olimpo before the season's curtailment; he also scored a brace over Desamparados in the Copa Argentina.

In June 2020, Cantero departed Sportivo Peñarol at the expiration of his contract and subsequently joined Primera División side Godoy Cruz. After going unused on the substitute's bench against River Plate a month prior, he made his debut on 14 December during a Copa de la Liga Profesional draw away to Central Córdoba; replacing Tomás Badaloni with eleven minutes left.

In February 2022, Cantero joined Primera Nacional club Estudiantes de Buenos Aires on a loan deal until the end of the year.

== Career statistics ==
As of 15 December 2020.

Appearances and goals by club, season and competition
Club	Season	League			Cup		League Cup		Continental		Other		Total	
Club	Season	Division	Apps	Goals	Apps	Goals	Apps	Goals	Apps	Goals	Apps	Goals	Apps	Goals
Sportivo Peñarol	2019–20	Torneo Federal A	19	5	2	2	—		—		0	0	21	7
Godoy Cruz	2020–21 (Note: Soccerway counts Copa de la Liga Profesional appearances as league appearances.)	Primera División	1	0	0	0	0	0	—		0	0	1	0
Career total			20	5	2	2	0	0	—		0	0	22	7
