= Mateo Maccari =

Argentine footballer

Personal information
- Full name: Mateo Ignacio Maccari
- Date of birth: 29 December 2000 (age 25)
- Place of birth: Rosario, Argentina
- Height: 1.82 m (6 ft 0 in)
- Position: Central midfielder

Team information
- Current team: Deportivo Cuenca
- Number: 30

Youth career
- Newell's Old Boys

Senior career*
Years	Team	Apps	(Gls)
2020–2025	Newell's Old Boys	10	(0)
2022	→ Agropecuario (loan)	24	(0)
2023–2024	→ Chaco For Ever (loan)	35	(1)
2025–	Deportivo Cuenca	23	(0)
- * Club domestic league appearances and goals as of 22 February 2026

Mateo Ignacio Maccari (born 29 December 2000) is an Argentine professional footballer who plays as a central midfielder for Ecuadorian Serie A club Deportivo Cuenca.

== Career ==
Maccari came through the youth ranks at Newell's Old Boys. He made the breakthrough into first-team football under manager Frank Darío Kudelka in mid-2020, initially as an unused substitute for Copa de la Liga Profesional matches with Talleres and Boca Juniors. Maccari made his senior debut in the same competition on 14 November, featuring for the final moments of a victory away to Lanús.

== Career statistics ==
As of 22 February 2026.

Appearances and goals by club, season and competition
Club	Division	League			Cup		Continental		Total	
Club	Division	Season	Apps	Goals	Apps	Goals	Apps	Goals	Apps	Goals
Newell's Old Boys	Primera División	2020	-		1	0	-		1	0
Newell's Old Boys	Primera División	2021	9	0	0	0	0	0	9	0
Newell's Old Boys	Total		9	0	1	0	0	0	10	0
Agropecuario	Primera B Nacional	2022	25	0	3	0	-		28	0
Chaco For Ever	Primera B Nacional	2023	27	1	3	0	-		30	1
Chaco For Ever	Primera B Nacional	2024	8	0	0	0	-		8	0
Chaco For Ever	Total		35	1	3	0	-		38	1
Deportivo Cuenca	Ecuadorian Serie A	2025	22	0	2	0	-		24	0
Deportivo Cuenca	Ecuadorian Serie A	2026	1	0	0	0	-		1	0
Deportivo Cuenca	Total		23	0	2	0	-		25	0
Career total			92	1	9	0	0	0	101	1
