= Tomás Cavanagh =

Argentine professional footballer

Personal information
- Full name: Tomás Bernardo Cavanagh
- Date of birth: 5 January 2001 (age 25)
- Place of birth: Amenábar, Argentina
- Height: 1.83 m (6 ft 0 in)
- Position: Left-back

Team information
- Current team: Danubio (on loan from Vélez Sarsfield)
- Number: 31

Youth career
- 2015–2020: Vélez Sarsfield

Senior career*
Years	Team	Apps	(Gls)
2020–	Vélez Sarsfield	13	(0)
2022	→ Talleres (loan)	1	(0)
2024	→ Tigre (loan)	6	(0)
2026–	→ Danubio (loan)	5	(0)
- * Club domestic league appearances and goals as of 19:05, 17 March 2026 (UTC)

Tomás Bernardo Cavanagh (born 5 January 2001) is an Argentine professional footballer who plays as a left-back for Danubio, on loan from Vélez Sarsfield.

== Career ==
Cavanagh joined the youth ranks of Vélez Sarsfield in 2015. He made the breakthrough into their first-team in 2020, with manager Mauricio Pellegrino selecting him to play in friendly matches against the likes of Nueva Chicago and Platense; he was sent off in the latter encounter. He was initially an unused substitute seven times before making his bow, including for three Copa Sudamericana fixtures. Cavanagh's senior debut did arrive on 5 December in the Copa de la Liga Profesional against Patronato, with the left-back coming on in place of Tomás Guidara for the final ten minutes of a 0–0 draw.

In January 2022, Cavanagh was loaned out to fellow league club Talleres de Córdoba with a purchase option, until the end of 2022.

In September 2024, Cavanagh was loaned out to Tigre until the end of 2024.

== Personal life ==
Born in Argentina, Cavanagh is of Irish descent.

== Career statistics ==
As of 29 December 2020.

Appearances and goals by club, season and competition
Club	Season	League			Cup		League Cup		Continental		Other		Total	
Club	Season	Division	Apps	Goals	Apps	Goals	Apps	Goals	Apps	Goals	Apps	Goals	Apps	Goals
Vélez Sarsfield	2020–21 (Note: Soccerway counts Copa de la Liga Profesional appearances as league appearances.)	Primera División	4	0	0	0	0	0	0	0	0	0	4	0
Career total			4	0	0	0	0	0	0	0	0	0	4	0
