= Tomás Bolzicco =

Argentine footballer

Personal information
- Date of birth: 29 November 1994 (age 31)
- Place of birth: Santa Fe, Argentina
- Height: 1.88 m (6 ft 2 in)
- Position: Forward

Team information
- Current team: Chaco For Ever

Senior career*
Years	Team	Apps	(Gls)
2013–2016	Unión	8	(0)
2016	Unión La Calera	6	(0)
2017	Atlético Paraná	9	(1)
2017–2018	Sportivo Las Parejas	27	(3)
2018–2019	J.J. de Urquiza	29	(6)
2019	Aurora	16	(3)
2020	Villa San Carlos	7	(1)
2020–2023	Estudiantes	95	(19)
2022	→ Macará (loan)	12	(1)
2023–2024	Reggina	24	(4)
2024	Fasano	12	(0)
2024	Sanremese	1	(0)
2025–2026	Alvarado	32	(4)
2026–	Chaco For Ever	4	(0)
- * Club domestic league appearances and goals as of 16:40, 25 April 2026 (UTC)

Tomás Bolzicco (born 29 November 1994) is an Argentine footballer who plays as a forward for Chaco For Ever.
