= Ramiro Ruiz Rodríguez =

Argentine footballer

Personal information
- Full name: Ramiro Ruiz Rodríguez
- Date of birth: 21 March 2000 (age 26)
- Place of birth: Tucumán, Argentina
- Position: Forward

Team information
- Current team: Atlético Tucumán
- Number: 18

Youth career
- Atlético Tucumán

Senior career*
Years	Team	Apps	(Gls)
2020–	Atlético Tucumán	152	(14)
2024	→ Talleres (loan)	18	(0)
- * Club domestic league appearances and goals as of 16:42, 26 May 2026 (UTC)

Ramiro Ruiz Rodríguez (born 21 March 2000) is an Argentine professional footballer who plays as a forward for Atlético Tucumán.

== Professional career ==
Ruiz Rodríguez made his professional debut with Atlético Tucumán in a 2-2 Argentine Primera División tie with Lanús on 23 February 2020. He scored his first professional goal against Racing Club de Avellaneda on November 1, 2020.
