= Estudiantes de Buenos Aires =

Argentine sports club

Estudiantes
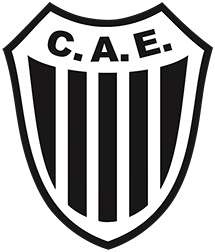
- Full name: Club Atlético Estudiantes
- Nicknames: Pincha; Matador
- Founded: 15 August 1898; 128 years ago
- Ground: Estadio Ciudad de Caseros, Caseros, Buenos Aires
- Capacity: 16,740
- Manager: Alfredo Grelak
- League: Primera Nacional
- 2025: Primera Nacional Zone B, 3rd of 18
- Website: caestudiantes.com.ar
Home colours	Away colours	Third colours

Club Atlético Estudiantes, usually called Estudiantes de Caseros or Estudiantes de Buenos Aires, is an Argentine football club from Caseros, Buenos Aires. The club is mostly known for its football team, which currently plays in the Primera B Nacional, the second division of the Argentine football league system.

Apart from football, the club hosts other disciplines such as handball, karate, roller skating and taekwondo.

== History ==
=== The beginning ===
By 1897 football in Argentina was practised almost exclusively by English people that lived in Buenos Aires. Three of those immigrants, called Hansen, McHardy and Fitz Simons, encouraged a group of Argentine young people to join them in order to form a team. The club was officially founded on 15 August 1898, and the name was taken from the High School they attended: Colegion Nacional Sur.

The young native players soon learned from the English men, who taught them the basics of playing football. By 1899 the name had been changed to Estudiantes, which was easier to pronounce by team's followers from the standgrounds.

=== First achievements ===
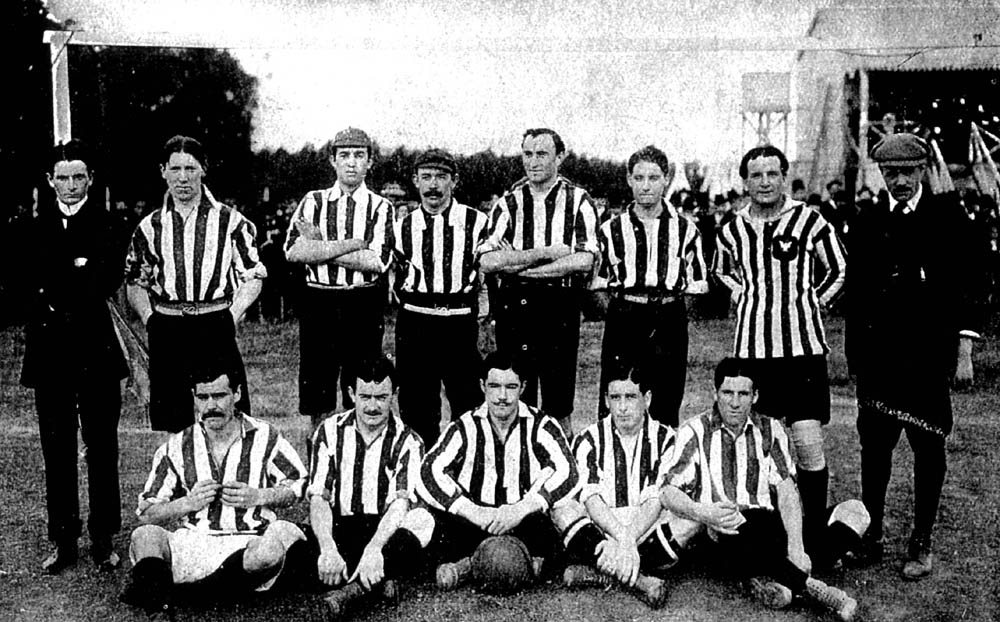
Estudiantes team of 1907

In 1904 Estudiantes promoted to Primera División. By then, the club had built a stadium, placed in Palermo, Buenos Aires where it played its home games. During the amateur years Estudiantes won its first title, the Copa de Competencia Jockey Club in 1910, defeating Gimnasia y Esgrima de Buenos Aires by 3–1 at the final.

The team also reached three Copa de Honor Municipalidad de Buenos Aires finals in 1906, 1909 and 1913 but could not win the trophy. The recognition earned during those years encouraged the managers to put the team on tours over other provinces of Argentina. These tours would also help to spread the playing of football in the rest of Argentina, increasing the popularity of this sport amongst its population. The first tour was in 1907 where Estudiantes played some matches against local teams. One of them was on May 5, 1907, when Estudiantes defeated Newell's Old Boys by 3–2. That was the first team the Rosarino team faced a squad from Buenos Aires.

Nevertheless, the most important tour took part in Brazil in 1910. Never before an Argentine football team had played outside the Río de la Plata. Estudiantes played four matches in Brazil, winning all of them. The squad scored 24 goals and conceded 3. Back in Buenos Aires, the players were received and acclaimed by a crowd and were also invited to numerous receptions due to their great performance.

=== Primera División ===
Estudiantes playing Porteño, 18 Jul 1915.

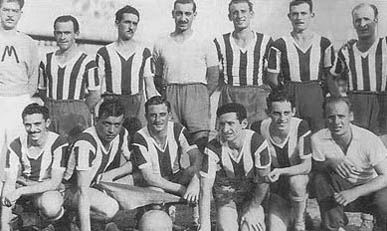
The 1942 team which won the first championship for the club.

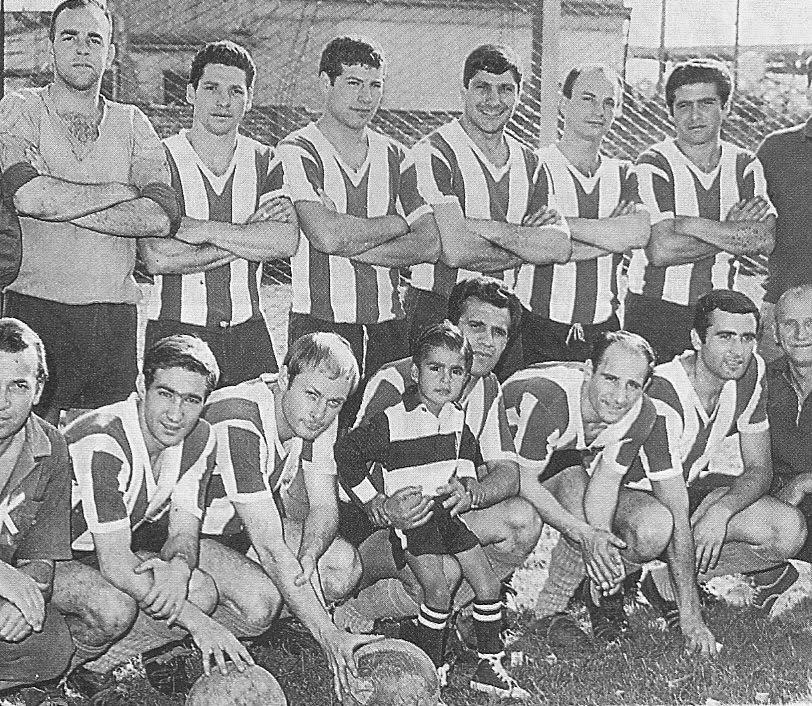
In 1966 the team won the Primera C title.

In 1928 Estudiantes merged with Sportivo Devoto, which allowed the club to incorporate some players from that club who would become notable playing for Estudiantes. Some of them were wing Nardini, forward Luis Sánchez and midfielders Horacio Méndez and Antonio Martínez. Those players, along with Estudiantes' former players such as Muschetti, Closas and Camilo Méndez formed a team that played memorable matches against Boca Juniors and River Plate. Nevertheless, the difference between called "small" teams and the "big" ones (because of being less popular than Boca, River or Independiente) was considerable. That was more visible when the Professional era began in 1931 in Argentina with the creation of Liga Argentina. Estudiantes remained in the amateur league (which had been left by the called "big ones"), which soon lost interest so fans choose the professional championship, where their teams had moved to. Moreover, most of Estudiantes' notable players were seduced by good offers from other clubs and soon left the team. Some of the footballers that left Estudiantes were Nardini and Martínez (transferred to Boca), "Huesito" Sánchez (to Platense), Closas (to San Lorenzo de Almagro) and Camilo Méndez (acquired by River Plate).

=== Losing territory ===
Once the fusion between the Professional League and Amateur League was finalized, Estudiantes started its run in the second division. In 1940 the club was sent down to the third division (now Primera C Metropolitana) after finishing in the penultimate position of the tournament. Two years after, the club obtained the championship and were promoted back to Primera B, after defeating Liniers in the finals.

Some highlights for Estudiantes were the great campaign of 1947, with Juan Calicchio being the top scorer with 36 goals in 40 matches played. Banfield's notable forward Gustavo Albella was the second top-scorer with 35 goals. In 1959 Estudiantes was relegated to the fourth division (Primera D) after finishing in last place. In May 1963 the club inaugurated its stadium in Caseros, Greater Buenos Aires, in a match against Sacachispas. That same year Estudiantes was relegated to Primera C after a restructuring of the Argentine league system. This lasted to 1966 when Estudiantes won another title, promoting to Primera B again.

=== Back to First Division ===
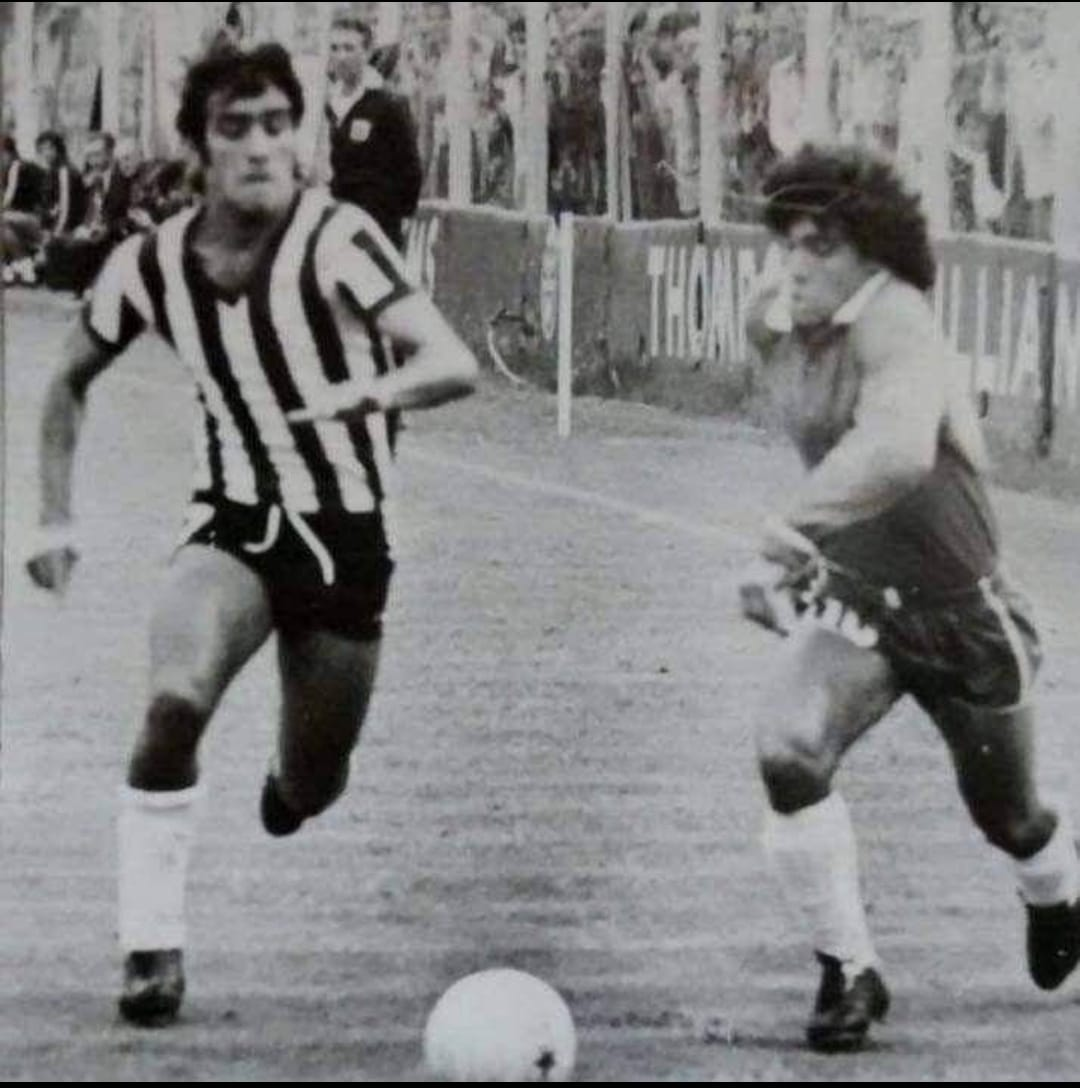
Jalil, from Estudiantes, and a young Diego Maradona, from Argentinos Juniors, during a match corresponding to the 1978 Metropolitano Championship

In 1974 Estudiantes had a great season and reached the second division championship final. The decisive match was against Unión de Santa Fe; Estudiantes lost 1–0 and was not able to reach promotion into the Primera División.

That loss affected players' performances and the following seasons Estudiantes did not have great campaigns; in 1975 Estudiantes finished last and in 1976 they finished 12th. However, for the 1977 season Estudiantes strengthened their team and won the championship, returning to Primera División after four decades. In the campaign Estudiantes played a total of 36 matches, winning 17 with 14 draws and 5 defeats. Estudiantes suffered in the final fourteen matches, winning just three, but important draws combined with poor results from other team eventually helped them win the championship title under manager Ricardo Trigilli.

During the 1978 season in Primera, one of the most important matches Estudiantes played was against Boca Juniors. The game ended up in a 1–1 tie, which allowed Quilmes a great chance to obtain the championship (which the "Cervecero" finally took advantage of). However at the end of the season, Estudiantes went down again.

=== Institutional development ===
Back in the Primera B, Estudiantes (still being coached by Trigilli) built two new stands to increase the stadium capacity. Trigilli left in 1982, where the team had poor performances, almost being relegated to Primera C. Trigilli came back in 1983 and Estudiantes qualified to the promotion playoffs searching for a place in Primera, where they were eliminated by Deportivo Italiano.

In 1986, Argentine football was restructured again, and therefore the Primera B Nacional was created as the second division. Estudiantes could not qualify to be in that tournament (finished 10th and only 8 were able to play in Nacional B) so the squad went to Primera B, renamed "Primera B Metropolitana", although it was a third division of the league system.

In 1988 the club inaugurated a new grandstand which a capacity of 10,000 seats.

=== 1990s and 2000s: Bouncing divisions, Deep cup campaigns ===
After poor performances in past seasons, Estudiantes brought Ricardo Trigilli back as its coach. Under his command, the team could keep its place in the third division. In the 1995–96 season Estudiantes achieved the so long-awaited promotion to Nacional B, defeating its historical rival Almagro with a memorable 5–1 scoreline in the second final match (after finishing 2–2 the first game). Trigilli achieved the record of being the team's coach in the two promotions obtained by the club, 1977 and 1995–96.

In the 1998–99 season Estudiantes was relegated to Primera B Metropolitana again, along with Atlanta. Only a year lasted until the team's return to Primera B Nacional by defeating Sarmiento de Junín. In 2001 Estudiantes was relegated to Primera B Metropolitana again.

In the 2012–13 Copa Argentina with the team still in the third tier, Estudiantes made the semi-finals in a memorable campaign where they eliminated River Plate, Banfield, and Talleres, before losing to San Lorenzo on penalties after a 1–1 draw.

=== 2019–present: New heights ===
In April 2019, after a stellar campaign in the third tier, Estudiantes achieved promotion to the second-tier for the first time in 18 years. Also in 2019, Estudiantes had a fairytale run in the Copa Argentina. Still in the third tier, Estudiantes began their run in the round of 64 by eliminating 2012 Copa Sudamericana runner ups Tigre 3–0. In the round of 32, they eliminated Arsenal de Sarandí 3–2. Now in the round of 16, they were faced against the biggest surprise of the tournament, fifth division club Real Pilar who had eliminated first division club Vélez Sarsfield and by doing so made history by becoming the first fifth division club to eliminate a first division club from the cup. Real Pilar was leading the match 1-0 until a 97th minute volley from Lautaro Montoya tied the match and sent the match into a penalty shootout, with Estudiantes winning the shootout and qualifying for the quarter finals. In the quarterfinals they were drawn with Copa Sudamericana finalists Colón, with the match ending 2-2 and Estudiantes winning another penalty shootout to qualify for the semi-finals. In the semi-finals they were drawn with another Buenos Aires club and Argentine powerhouse River Plate, where Estudiantes held the match to a narrow 1–0 scoreline until Exequiel Palacios scored in the 96th minute for the 2–0 victory which put an end to the club's memorable run.

In the 2022 Primera Nacional, Estudiantes finished the regular season in seventh place out of 37, which gave them a berth into the promotion playoffs. Estudiantes beat Chaco For Ever 4–0 on aggregate in the first round, then beat Gimnasia y Esgrima de Mendoza 2–0 on aggregate to set up a final with Instituto. The first leg ended in a 0–0 draw, and in the second leg, Estudiantes opened the scoring but then Instituto tied the match in the second half. The match finished 1–1 and Instituto achieved promotion to the top tier based on a better season record; although Estudiantes missed out on promotion this was a memorable campaign that had them a goal away from being in the top tier of Argentine football for the first time in decades.

== Club facilities ==
The club was founded in Buenos Aires, in the corner of Blandengues Avenue (today Avenida del Libertador) and calle Oro. In 1920 it moved to Figueroa Alcorta and Dorrego Avenues and then in 1931 moved again to Villa Devoto, location where the club is based in today. In 1963 Estudiantes opened its own stadium in Caseros, Buenos Aires.

== Badge evolution ==
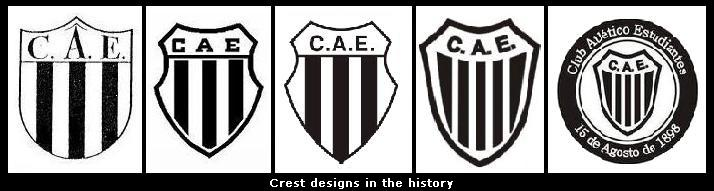

== Current squad ==
As of 17 July 2022

Note: Flags indicate national team as defined under FIFA eligibility rules; some limited exceptions apply. Players may hold more than one non-FIFA nationality.

No.	Pos.	Nation	Player
1	GK	ARG	Lucas Bruera
2	DF	ARG	Juan Randazzo
3	DF	ARG	Nicolás Fernández
4	DF	ARG	Delfor Minervino
5	MF	ARG	Nicolás Pelaitay
6	DF	ARG	Stefano Brundo
7	MF	ARG	Enzo Acosta (loan from Quilmes)
8	MF	ARG	Sebastián Mayorga
9	FW	ARG	Facundo Castelli (loan from Maipú)
10	MF	ARG	Facundo Pereyra
11	FW	ARG	Kevin González
12	GK	ARG	Daniel Monllor

No.	Pos.	Nation	Player
13	DF	ARG	Iván Zafarana
14	DF	ARG	Diego López
15	MF	ARG	Iván Smith (loan from Racing Club)
16	MF	ARG	Fernando Miranda (loan from Ferro)
17	FW	ARG	Ramon Villalba
18	FW	ARG	Franco Lonardi
19	FW	ARG	Tomás Bolzicco
20	FW	ARG	Lautaro Parisi
22	DF	ARG	Lautaro Lusnig
23	FW	ARG	Alan Cantero (loan from Godoy Cruz)
24	FW	ARG	Emiliano López
57	MF	ARG	Luca Andrada (loan from Racing Club)

=== Out on loan ===
Note: Flags indicate national team as defined under FIFA eligibility rules; some limited exceptions apply. Players may hold more than one non-FIFA nationality.

No.	Pos.	Nation	Player
21	DF	ARG	Martín Garay (at Atlético Tucumán until 31 December 2022)
25	FW	ARG	Juan Pablo Ruíz (at Ferro Carril Oeste until 31 December 2022)
26	FW	ARG	Lautaro Díaz (at Independiente del Valle until 30 June 2023)
37	FW	ARG	Nicolás Toloza (at Flandria until 31 December 2022)

== Honours ==
- Copa de Competencia Jockey Club (1): 1910
- Segunda División (3): 1906, (Note: As many clubs used to do by those years, Estudiantes played this tournament with a reserve team (called "Estudiantes II"), so the senior team was playing in Primera División by then.) 1977, 1999–00
- Primera C (4): 1903, 1904, 1942, 1966
