= Rodrigo Bogarín =

Paraguayan footballer (born 1997)

Personal information
- Full name: Rodrigo Manuel Bogarín Giménez
- Date of birth: 24 May 1997 (age 29)
- Place of birth: Lambaré, Paraguay
- Height: 1.82 m (6 ft 0 in)
- Position: Right midfielder

Team information
- Current team: Barracas Central
- Number: 28

Youth career
- 2007–2010: Atlético Colegiales
- 2010–2014: Guaraní

Senior career*
Years	Team	Apps	(Gls)
2014–2018	Guaraní	108	(24)
2019–2023	Libertad	79	(9)
2023–2026	Defensa y Justicia	52	(4)
2025	→ Querétaro (loan)	30	(2)
2026–	Barracas Central	5	(0)

International career
2014	Paraguay U17	2	(1)
2015–2017	Paraguay U20	5	(2)
- * Club domestic league appearances and goals as of 17:07, 3 June 2026 (UTC)

Rodrigo Manuel Bogarín Giménez (born 24 May 1997) is a Paraguayan professional footballer who plays as a right midfielder for Argentine club Barracas Central.

== Career ==
In January 2019, Bogarín joined Club Libertad.

== Personal life ==
Bogarín has a sister, Dahiana Bogarín, who represents Paraguay at women's youth levels.
