= Axel Atum =

Argentine footballer (born 2006)

Personal information
- Date of birth: 2 January 2006 (age 20)
- Place of birth: Gualeguaychú, Entre Ríos
- Position: Midfielder

Team information
- Current team: Estudiantes de La Plata
- Number: 40

Youth career
- 2010-2017: Central Entre Rios
- 2017–2023: Estudiantes de La Plata

Senior career*
Years	Team	Apps	(Gls)
2023–	Estudiantes de La Plata	13	(0)
2025–2026	→ Racing Montevideo (loan)	6	(0)
- * Club domestic league appearances and goals as of 16:34, 27 May 2026 (UTC)

Axel Atum (born 2 January 2006) is an Argentine footballer who plays as a midfielder for Argentine Primera División club Estudiantes de La Plata.

== Early life ==
From Gualeguaychú, Entre Ríos, he played for Central Entrerriano prior to joining Estudiantes de La Plata aged eleven years-old. He trained with the Argentina national under-17 football team under Pablo Aimar.

== Career ==
In January 2023, just after he turned seventeen years-old, Atum made his debut in the Estudiantes de La Plata reserve team. In April 2023 he received his first call-up to the Estudiantes de La Plata first team squad under coach Eduardo Dominguez and was given first team squad number 40.

On May 8, 2023, he made his first team debut in the Argentine Primera Division as a substitute in a 2–0 win over Velez Sarsfield. He was credited with an assist for Gastón Benedetti to score the second goal.

In January 2025, he moved abroad to join Uruguayan Primera División side Racing Montevideo, on a year-long loan with an option to buy.

== Career statistics ==
As of match played on 13 October 2023

Club statistics
Club	Season	League			National Cup		League Cup		Other		Total	
Club	Season	Division	Apps	Goals	Apps	Goals	Apps	Goals	Apps	Goals	Apps	Goals
Estudiantes (LP)	2023	Argentine Primera División	2	0	1	0	3	0	—		6	0
Career totals			2	0	1	0	3	0	0	0	6	0

== Personal life ==
His father, Walter Atum, helped him with his dream to play football.

== Honours ==
Estudiantes

- Copa de la Liga Profesional: 2024
