= Club Social y Deportivo Yupanqui =

Argentine football club

Yupanqui
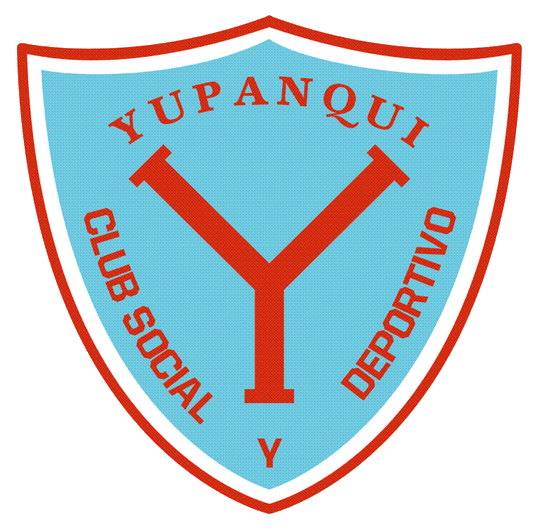
- Full name: Club Social y Deportivo Yupanqui
- Nickname(s): Los Traperos; Los Pochas
- Founded: 12 October 1935; 89 years ago
- Ground: (None)
- Chairman: (Argentina) Dante Majori
- Manager: (Argentina) Juan Gabriel Palermo
- League: Primera C
- 2022: 1st (champions)
Home colours	Away colours

Club Social y Deportivo Yupanqui is an Argentine football club that currently plays in the Primera C Metropolitana, the fourth division of the Argentine league system. The club was named by searching for unusual words in the dictionary. Yupanqui was picked up because the meaning of the Quechua word, "the posterity will talk about you".

== History ==
Yupanqui gained some notoriety in Argentina after a Coca-Cola television advertisement where it was referred to as the club with the least fans in Argentina.

Before the Coca-Cola advertisement, the average number of fans that would show up to each game was between 5 and 7. After the advertisement, about 50 new club members joined. Even after the spike in recognition, the money they made was used for several projects such as restoring bathrooms, build a theater, a chess room, and the soccer team didn't receive any funding, even though they were solely responsible for all the recognition the club had received.

== Players ==
Note: Flags indicate national team as defined under FIFA eligibility rules; some limited exceptions apply. Players may hold more than one non-FIFA nationality.

No.	Pos.	Nation	Player
—	GK	ARG	Darío Alemán
—	FW	ARG	Nahuel La Sala

== Titles ==
- Primera D (1): 2022
