= Nicolás Pelaitay =

Argentine footballer

Personal information
- Full name: Nicolás Pelaitay
- Date of birth: 27 December 1992 (age 33)
- Place of birth: Nueve de Julio, Argentina
- Height: 1.68 m (5 ft 6 in)
- Position: Midfielder

Team information
- Current team: San Martín SJ

Youth career
- 2009–2013: San Martín SJ

Senior career*
Years	Team	Apps	(Gls)
2013–2021	San Martín SJ	108	(2)
2021–2023	Estudiantes BA	35	(0)
2023–	San Martín SJ	88	(2)
- * Club domestic league appearances and goals as of 18:57, 19 March 2026 (UTC)

Nicolás Pelaitay (born 27 December 1992) is an Argentine professional footballer who plays as a midfielder for San Martín SJ.

== Career ==
San Martín signed Pelaitay in 2009. His senior career with them got underway in early 2013, when he was an unused substitute for Argentine Primera División fixtures with Racing Club and Unión Santa Fe. In May 2013, Pelaitay made his professional bow during a 2–1 win versus Argentinos Juniors. In the following campaign of 2013–14, in Primera B Nacional following relegation, Pelaitay netted his first goal in an away defeat to Unión Santa Fe on 24 March 2014. In his opening six seasons with San Martín, he scored twice in sixty-five matches in all competitions.

At the end of July 2021, Pelaitay moved to Primera Nacional side Estudiantes de Buenos Aires, signing a deal until the end of 2022.

== Career statistics ==
As of 22 May 2018.

Club statistics
Club	Season	League			Cup (Note: Includes the Copa Argentina)		League Cup		Continental		Other		Total	
Club	Season	Division	Apps	Goals	Apps	Goals	Apps	Goals	Apps	Goals	Apps	Goals	Apps	Goals
San Martín	2012–13	Primera División	1	0	0	0	—		—		0	0	1	0
San Martín	2013–14	Primera B Nacional	13	1	1	0	—		—		0	0	14	1
San Martín	2014	Primera B Nacional	8	0	0	0	—		—		0	0	8	0
San Martín	2015	Primera División	21	0	1	0	—		—		0	0	22	0
San Martín	2016	Primera División	4	0	1	0	—		—		0	0	5	0
San Martín	2016–17	Primera División	14	1	1	0	—		—		0	0	15	1
San Martín	2017–18	Primera División	9	0	0	0	—		—		0	0	9	0
Career total			70	2	4	0	—		—		0	0	74	2
