= Eros Mancuso =

Argentine footballer

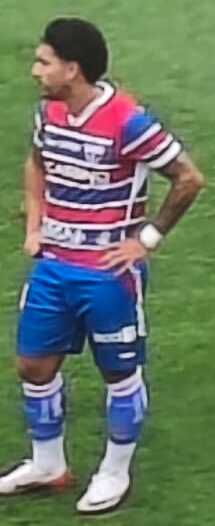
- Mancuso playing for Fortaleza in 2025

Personal information
- Full name: Eros Nazareno Mancuso
- Date of birth: 17 April 1999 (age 27)
- Place of birth: Haedo, Buenos Aires, Argentina
- Height: 1.67 m (5 ft 6 in)
- Position: Right-back

Team information
- Current team: Estudiantes (on loan from Fortaleza)
- Number: 40

Youth career
- Boca Juniors

Senior career*
Years	Team	Apps	(Gls)
2021–2022	Boca Juniors	6	(1)
2022–2024	Estudiantes	48	(5)
2024–	Fortaleza	47	(2)
2026–	→ Estudiantes (loan)	25	(1)
- * Club domestic league appearances and goals as of 17:44, 21 November 2026 (UTC)

Eros Nazareno Mancuso (born 17 April 1999) is an Argentine footballer who plays as a right-back for Estudiantes, on loan from Brazilian club Fortaleza.

== Career statistics ==
=== Club ===
As of 18 August 2021.

Club	Season	League			Cup		Continental		Other		Total	
Club	Season	Division	Apps	Goals	Apps	Goals	Apps	Goals	Apps	Goals	Apps	Goals
Boca Juniors	2021	Argentine Primera División	2	0	0	0	0	0	0	0	2	0
Career total			2	0	0	0	0	0	0	0	2	0

== Honours ==
Boca Juniors

- Copa Argentina: 2020

Estudiantes

- Copa Argentina: 2023
- Copa de la Liga Profesional: 2024
