= 2026 Copa Libertadores qualifying stages =

The 2026 Copa Libertadores qualifying stages were played from 3 February to 12 March 2026. A total of 19 teams competed in the qualifying stages to decide four of the 32 places in the group stage of the 2026 Copa Libertadores.

== Draw ==
The draw for the qualifying stages was held on 18 December 2025, 12:00 PYT (UTC−3), at the CONMEBOL Convention Centre in Luque, Paraguay.

Teams were seeded by their CONMEBOL Clubs ranking as of 15 December 2025 (shown in parentheses), taking into account the following three factors:

1. Performance in the last 10 years, taking into account Copa Libertadores and Copa Sudamericana results in the period 2016–2025.
2. Historical coefficient, taking into account Copa Libertadores and Copa Sudamericana results in the period 1960–2015 and 2002–2015 respectively.
3. Local tournament champion, with bonus points awarded to domestic league champions of the last 10 years.

For the first stage, the six teams were drawn into three ties (E1–E3), with the teams from Pot 1 hosting the second leg.

First stage draw
Pot 1	Pot 2
(Peru) Alianza Lima (40); (Venezuela) Deportivo Táchira (50); (Ecuador) Universidad Católica (60)	(Paraguay) 2 de Mayo (247); (Uruguay) Juventud (287); (Bolivia) The Strongest (41)

1. ^{†} The identity of the team from Bolivia was not known at the time of the draw and it was seeded in Pot 2.

For the second stage, the 16 teams were drawn into eight ties (C1–C8), with the teams from Pot 1 hosting the second leg. Teams from the same association could not be drawn into the same tie, excluding the three winners of the first stage, which were seeded in Pot 2 and whose identity was not known at the time of the draw, and could be drawn into the same tie with another team from the same association.

Second stage draw
Pot 1	Pot 2
(Brazil) Botafogo (19); (Peru) Sporting Cristal (38); (Paraguay) Guaraní (44); (Colombia) Independiente Medellín (45); (Argentina) Argentinos Juniors (47); (Colombia) Deportes Tolima (57); (Brazil) Bahia (63); (Chile) Huachipato (71)	(Uruguay) Liverpool (85); (Venezuela) Carabobo (128); (Chile) O'Higgins (166); (Bolivia) Nacional Potosí (92); (Ecuador) Barcelona (28); First stage winner E1; First stage winner E2; First stage winner E3

1. ^{†} The identity of the teams from Bolivia and Ecuador was not known at the time of the draw and they were seeded in Pot 2.

For the third stage, the eight winners of the second stage were allocated without any draw into the following four ties (G1–G4), with the team in each tie with the higher CONMEBOL ranking hosting the second leg.

- Second stage winner C1 vs. Second stage winner C8
- Second stage winner C2 vs. Second stage winner C7
- Second stage winner C3 vs. Second stage winner C6
- Second stage winner C4 vs. Second stage winner C5

== Format ==
In the qualifying stages, each tie was played on a home-and-away two-legged basis. If tied on aggregate, extra time would not be played, and a penalty shoot-out was used to determine the winner (Regulations Article 2.4.3).

== Bracket ==
The qualifying stages were structured as follows:

- First stage (6 teams): The three winners of the first stage advanced to the second stage to join the 13 teams which were given byes to the second stage.
- Second stage (16 teams): The eight winners of the second stage advanced to the third stage.
- Third stage (8 teams): The four winners of the third stage advanced to the group stage to join the 28 direct entrants. The four teams eliminated in the third stage entered the Copa Sudamericana group stage.

The bracket was decided based on the first stage draw and second stage draw, which was held on 18 December 2025.

=== Winner G1 ===
First stage
(Uruguay) Juventud (p)	0	4	4 (4)
(Ecuador) Universidad Católica	1	3	4 (3)

Second stage
(Uruguay) Juventud	0	2	2
(Paraguay) Guaraní	0	1	1
(Uruguay) Liverpool	1	0	1
(Colombia) Independiente Medellín	2	0	2

Third stage
(Uruguay) Juventud	1	1	2
(Colombia) Independiente Medellín	1	2	3

=== Winner G2 ===
First stage
(Bolivia) The Strongest	2	0	2 (3)
(Venezuela) Deportivo Táchira (p)	1	1	2 (5)

Second stage
(Chile) O'Higgins (p)	1	1	2 (4)
(Brazil) Bahia	0	2	2 (3)
(Venezuela) Deportivo Táchira	0	1	1 (0)
(Colombia) Deportes Tolima (p)	1	0	1 (3)

Third stage
(Chile) O'Higgins	1	0	1
(Colombia) Deportes Tolima	0	2	2

=== Winner G3 ===
First stage
(Paraguay) 2 de Mayo	1	1	2
(Peru) Alianza Lima	0	1	1

Second stage
(Venezuela) Carabobo	1	2	3
(Chile) Huachipato	0	1	1
(Paraguay) 2 de Mayo	2	0	2 (4)
(Peru) Sporting Cristal (p)	2	0	2 (5)

Third stage
(Venezuela) Carabobo	0	2	2 (2)
(Peru) Sporting Cristal (p)	1	1	2 (3)

=== Winner G4 ===
Second stage
(Ecuador) Barcelona (p)	0	1	1 (5)
(Argentina) Argentinos Juniors	1	0	1 (4)
(Bolivia) Nacional Potosí	1	0	1
(Brazil) Botafogo	0	2	2

Third stage
(Ecuador) Barcelona	1	1	2
(Brazil) Botafogo	1	0	1

== First stage ==
=== Summary ===
The first legs were played on 3–5 February, and the second legs were played on 10–12 February 2026.

Team 1	Agg.	Team 2	1st leg	2nd leg
The Strongest (Bolivia)	2–2 (3–5 p)	(Venezuela) Deportivo Táchira	2–1	0–1
Juventud (Uruguay)	4–4 (4–3 p)	(Ecuador) Universidad Católica	0–1	4–3
2 de Mayo (Paraguay)	2–1	(Peru) Alianza Lima	1–0	1–1

=== Matches ===
3 February 2026
20:30 UTC−4

The Strongest (Bolivia)	2–1	(Venezuela) Deportivo Táchira
Arrascaita 56' (pen.); Ábrego 82' (pen.)	Report	Calzadilla 63'

Estadio Hernando Siles, La Paz
Attendance: 10,992
Referee: Paulo Zanovelli (Brazil)
10 February 2026
20:30 UTC−4

Deportivo Táchira (Venezuela)	1–0	(Bolivia) The Strongest
Pollero 32'	Report
Penalties
González (penalty scored); Balza (penalty scored); Fratta (penalty scored); Pollero (penalty scored); Camargo (penalty scored)	5–3	(penalty scored) Castro; (penalty scored) Roca; (penalty missed) Saucedo; (penalty scored) Cuéllar

Estadio Polideportivo de Pueblo Nuevo, San Cristóbal
Referee: Derlis López (Paraguay)

Tied 2–2 on aggregate, Deportivo Táchira won on penalties and advanced to the second stage (Match C2).

5 February 2026
21:30 UTC−3

Juventud (Uruguay)	0–1	(Ecuador) Universidad Católica
	Report	Chancellor 47'

Estadio Centenario, Montevideo (Note: Juventud played their first stage home match at Estadio Centenario, Montevideo instead of their regular stadium Estadio Parque Artigas Las Piedras, Las Piedras which did not meet CONMEBOL requirements.)
Attendance: 1,798
Referee: Gery Vargas (Bolivia)
12 February 2026
19:30 UTC−5

Universidad Católica (Ecuador)	3–4	(Uruguay) Juventud
Fajardo 6', 75'; Chancellor 64'	Report	Sánchez 25'; Barrandeguy 45+2' (pen.); Lago 49' (pen.); Pernicone 90+2'
Penalties
Cangá (penalty scored); Palacios (penalty scored); Anangonó (penalty scored); Chancellor (penalty missed); Cacciabue (penalty missed)	3–4	(penalty scored) Barrandeguy; (penalty scored) Cruz; (penalty missed) Gómez; (penalty scored) Peralta; (penalty scored) Mimbacas

Estadio Olímpico Atahualpa, Quito
Referee: Yael Falcón Pérez (Argentina)

Tied 4–4 on aggregate, Juventud won on penalties and advanced to the second stage (Match C1).

4 February 2026
21:30 UTC−3

2 de Mayo (Paraguay)	1–0	(Peru) Alianza Lima
Acosta 84'	Report

Estadio Río Parapití, Pedro Juan Caballero
Referee: José Burgos (Uruguay)
11 February 2026
19:30 UTC−5

Alianza Lima (Peru)	1–1	(Paraguay) 2 de Mayo
Advíncula 63'	Report	Ayala 74' (pen.)

Estadio Alejandro Villanueva, Lima
Referee: Flavio de Souza (Brazil)

2 de Mayo won 2–1 on aggregate and advanced to the second stage (Match C3).

== Second stage ==
=== Summary ===
The first legs were played on 17–19 February, and the second legs were played on 24–26 February 2026.

Team 1	Agg.	Team 2	1st leg	2nd leg
Juventud (Uruguay)	2–1	(Paraguay) Guaraní	0–0	2–1
Deportivo Táchira (Venezuela)	1–1 (0–3 p)	(Colombia) Deportes Tolima	0–1	1–0
2 de Mayo (Paraguay)	2–2 (4–5 p)	(Peru) Sporting Cristal	2–2	0–0
Barcelona (Ecuador)	1–1 (5–4 p)	(Argentina) Argentinos Juniors	0–1	1–0
Nacional Potosí (Bolivia)	1–2	(Brazil) Botafogo	1–0	0–2
Carabobo (Venezuela)	3–1	(Chile) Huachipato	1–0	2–1
O'Higgins (Chile)	2–2 (4–3 p)	(Brazil) Bahia	1–0	1–2
Liverpool (Uruguay)	1–2	(Colombia) Independiente Medellín	1–2	0–0

=== Matches ===
19 February 2026
19:00 UTC−3

Juventud (Uruguay)	0–0	(Paraguay) Guaraní
	Report

Parque Alfredo Víctor Viera, Montevideo (Note: Juventud played their second stage home match at Parque Alfredo Víctor Viera, Montevideo (originally scheduled at Estadio Centenario, Montevideo) instead of their regular stadium Estadio Parque Artigas Las Piedras, Las Piedras which did not meet CONMEBOL requirements.)
Referee: Rafael Klein (Brazil)
26 February 2026
19:00 UTC−3

Guaraní (Paraguay)	1–2	(Uruguay) Juventud
Servio 56' (pen.)	Report	Barrandeguy 50'; Peralta 90+4'

Estadio Defensores del Chaco, Asunción (Note: Guaraní played their home match at Estadio Defensores del Chaco, Asunción instead of their regular stadium Estadio Rogelio Livieres, Asunción which was being rebuilt.)
Referee: Cristian Garay (Chile)

Juventud won 2–1 on aggregate and advanced to the third stage (Match G1).

19 February 2026
20:30 UTC−4

Deportivo Táchira (Venezuela)	0–1	(Colombia) Deportes Tolima
	Report	Flórez 65'

Estadio Polideportivo de Pueblo Nuevo, San Cristóbal
Referee: Hernán Heras (Uruguay)
26 February 2026
19:30 UTC−5

Deportes Tolima (Colombia)	0–1	(Venezuela) Deportivo Táchira
	Report	L. González 90+4' (pen.)
Penalties
López (penalty scored); Sandoval (penalty scored); Rovira (penalty missed); Guzmán (penalty scored)	3–0	(penalty missed) L. González; (penalty missed) Balza; (penalty missed) Pollero

Estadio Manuel Murillo Toro, Ibagué
Referee: Leandro Rey Hilfer (Argentina)

Tied 1–1 on aggregate, Deportes Tolima won on penalties and advanced to the third stage (Match G2).

17 February 2026
21:30 UTC−3

2 de Mayo (Paraguay)	2–2	(Peru) Sporting Cristal
Cáceres 83'; Cristiano 84' (o.g.)	Report	Yotún 62' (pen.); Martínez 87' (o.g.)

Estadio Río Parapití, Pedro Juan Caballero
Attendance: 11,594
Referee: Carlos Betancur (Colombia)
24 February 2026
19:30 UTC−5

Sporting Cristal (Peru)	0–0	(Paraguay) 2 de Mayo
	Report
Penalties
Yotún (penalty scored); Benavente (penalty missed); Távara (penalty scored); Gonzáles (penalty scored); González (penalty scored); Cristiano (penalty scored)	5–4	(penalty scored) Romero; (penalty scored) Colman; (penalty scored) Ruiz Díaz; (penalty missed) Cáceres; (penalty scored) Ayala; (penalty missed) Coronel

Estadio Miguel Grau, Callao (Note: The Sporting Cristal vs. 2 de Mayo match, originally scheduled to be held at Estadio Nacional, Lima, was moved to Estadio Miguel Grau, Callao.)
Referee: Andrés Matonte (Uruguay)

Tied 2–2 on aggregate, Sporting Cristal won on penalties and advanced to the third stage (Match G3).

18 February 2026
19:30 UTC−5

Barcelona (Ecuador)	0–1	(Argentina) Argentinos Juniors
	Report	Porcel 90+1'

Estadio Monumental Isidro Romero Carbo, Guayaquil
Referee: Fernando Véjar (Chile)
25 February 2026
21:30 UTC−3

Argentinos Juniors (Argentina)	0–1	(Ecuador) Barcelona
	Report	Quiñónez 66'
Penalties
Lescano (penalty scored); López (penalty scored); Lozano (penalty scored); Morales (penalty missed); Giaccone (penalty scored); Riquelme (penalty missed); Godoy (penalty missed)	4–5	(penalty scored) Quiñónez; (penalty scored) Báez; (penalty scored) Villalba; (penalty missed) Martínez; (penalty scored) Parrales; (penalty missed) Rangel; (penalty scored) Céliz

Estadio Diego Armando Maradona, Buenos Aires
Referee: Esteban Ostojich (Uruguay)

Tied 1–1 on aggregate, Barcelona won on penalties and advanced to the third stage (Match G4).

18 February 2026
20:30 UTC−4

Nacional Potosí (Bolivia)	1–0	(Brazil) Botafogo
Baldomar 47'	Report

Estadio Víctor Agustín Ugarte, Potosí
Referee: Augusto Aragón (Ecuador)
25 February 2026
21:30 UTC−3

Botafogo (Brazil)	2–0	(Bolivia) Nacional Potosí
Alex Telles 5'; Danilo 45+6'	Report

Estádio Olímpico Nilton Santos, Rio de Janeiro
Attendance: 28,318
Referee: Piero Maza (Chile)

Botafogo won 2–1 on aggregate and advanced to the third stage (Match G4).

17 February 2026
18:00 UTC−4

Carabobo (Venezuela)	1–0	(Chile) Huachipato
Tortolero 35'	Report

Estadio Misael Delgado, Valencia
Referee: Andrés Rojas (Colombia)
24 February 2026
19:00 UTC−3

Huachipato (Chile)	1–2	(Venezuela) Carabobo
Martínez 87'	Report	Ramírez 29'; Tortolero 42'

Estadio Huachipato-CAP Acero, Talcahuano
Attendance: 4,328
Referee: Rodrigo Pereira (Brazil)

Carabobo won 3–1 on aggregate and advanced to the third stage (Match G3).

18 February 2026
19:00 UTC−3

O'Higgins (Chile)	1–0	(Brazil) Bahia
González 4'	Report

Estadio El Teniente, Rancagua
Attendance: 8,282
Referee: Javier Feres (Uruguay)
25 February 2026
19:00 UTC−3

Bahia (Brazil)	2–1	(Chile) O'Higgins
Willian José 1', 45+1'	Report	Castillo 54'
Penalties
Everaldo (penalty scored); Luciano Juba (penalty scored); Dell (penalty missed); Rodrigo Nestor (penalty scored); Éverton Ribeiro (penalty missed)	3–4	(penalty scored) González; (penalty missed) Castillo; (penalty scored) Pavez; (penalty scored) Vecino; (penalty scored) Brizuela

Arena Fonte Nova, Salvador
Attendance: 46,046
Referee: Maximiliano Ramírez (Argentina)

Tied 2–2 on aggregate, O'Higgins won on penalties and advanced to the third stage (Match G2).

17 February 2026
21:30 UTC−3

Liverpool (Uruguay)	1–2	(Colombia) Independiente Medellín
Strasorier 64'	Report	Fydriszewski 52'; H. Palacios 90+2'

Parque Alfredo Víctor Viera, Montevideo (Note: Liverpool played their home matches at Parque Alfredo Víctor Viera, Montevideo (originally scheduled at Estadio Centenario, Montevideo) instead of their regular stadium Estadio Belvedere, Montevideo which was being rebuilt.)
Referee: Bruno Arleu (Brazil)
24 February 2026
19:30 UTC−5

Independiente Medellín (Colombia)	0–0	(Uruguay) Liverpool
	Report

Estadio Atanasio Girardot, Medellín
Referee: Anderson Daronco (Brazil)

Independiente Medellín won 2–1 on aggregate and advanced to the third stage (Match G1).

== Third stage ==
=== Summary ===
The first legs were played on 3–5 March, and the second legs were played on 10–12 March 2026.

Team 1	Agg.	Team 2	1st leg	2nd leg
Juventud (Uruguay)	2–3	(Colombia) Independiente Medellín	1–1	1–2
O'Higgins (Chile)	1–2	(Colombia) Deportes Tolima	1–0	0–2
Carabobo (Venezuela)	2–2 (2–3 p)	(Peru) Sporting Cristal	0–1	2–1
Barcelona (Ecuador)	2–1	(Brazil) Botafogo	1–1	1–0

=== Matches ===
5 March 2026
21:30 UTC−3

Juventud (Uruguay)	1–1	(Colombia) Independiente Medellín
Larregui 74'	Report	Larrosa 32'

Estadio Gran Parque Central, Montevideo (Note: Juventud played their third stage home match at Estadio Gran Parque Central, Montevideo instead of their regular stadium Estadio Parque Artigas Las Piedras, Las Piedras which did not meet CONMEBOL requirements.)
Referee: Augusto Menéndez (Peru)
12 March 2026
19:30 UTC−5

Independiente Medellín (Colombia)	2–1	(Uruguay) Juventud
H. Palacios 14'; Fydriszewski 82'	Report	Barrandeguy 25'

Estadio Atanasio Girardot, Medellín
Referee: Juan Gabriel Benítez (Paraguay)

Independiente Medellín won 3–2 on aggregate and advanced to the group stage.

4 March 2026
21:30 UTC−3

O'Higgins (Chile)	1–0	(Colombia) Deportes Tolima
F. González 45+8'	Report

Estadio El Teniente, Rancagua
Attendance: 8,097
Referee: Andrés Matonte (Uruguay)
11 March 2026
19:30 UTC−5

Deportes Tolima (Colombia)	2–0	(Chile) O'Higgins
Hernández 38'; Torres 87'	Report

Estadio Manuel Murillo Toro, Ibagué
Referee: Anderson Daronco (Brazil)

Deportes Tolima won 2–1 on aggregate and advanced to the group stage.

4 March 2026
18:00 UTC−4

Carabobo (Venezuela)	0–1	(Peru) Sporting Cristal
	Report	Yotún 14' (pen.)

Estadio Misael Delgado, Valencia
Referee: Ramon Abatti (Brazil)
11 March 2026
17:00 UTC−5

Sporting Cristal (Peru)	1–2	(Venezuela) Carabobo
Castro 50'	Report	Castillo 4', 29'
Penalties
Yotún (penalty scored); Ávila (penalty missed); González (penalty scored); Gonzáles (penalty missed); Cristiano (penalty scored)	3–2	(penalty scored) Cova; (penalty missed) Orozco; (penalty missed) Aponte; (penalty scored) Núñez; (penalty missed) Moreno

Estadio Alejandro Villanueva, Lima (Note: Sporting Cristal played their third stage home match at Estadio Alejandro Villanueva, Lima instead of their regular stadium Estadio Alberto Gallardo, Lima which did not meet CONMEBOL requirements.)
Referee: Gustavo Tejera (Uruguay)

Tied 2–2 on aggregate, Sporting Cristal won on penalties and advanced to the group stage.

3 March 2026
19:30 UTC−5

Barcelona (Ecuador)	1–1	(Brazil) Botafogo
Villalba 22'	Report	Matheus Martins 66'

Estadio Monumental Isidro Romero Carbo, Guayaquil
Referee: Wilmar Roldán (Colombia)
10 March 2026
21:30 UTC−3

Botafogo (Brazil)	0–1	(Ecuador) Barcelona
	Report	Céliz 8'

Estádio Olímpico Nilton Santos, Rio de Janeiro
Referee: Piero Maza (Chile)

Barcelona won 2–1 on aggregate and advanced to the group stage.
