= 2026 Copa Libertadores group stage =

The 2026 Copa Libertadores group stage was played from 7 April to 28 May 2026. A total of 32 teams competed in the group stage to decide the 16 places in the final stages of the 2026 Copa Libertadores.

== Draw ==
The draw for the group stage was held on 19 March 2026, 20:00 PYT (UTC−3), at the CONMEBOL Convention Centre in Luque, Paraguay.

Teams were seeded by their CONMEBOL Clubs ranking as of 15 December 2025 (shown in parentheses), taking into account the following three factors:

1. Performance in the last 10 years, taking into account Copa Libertadores and Copa Sudamericana results in the period 2016–2025.
2. Historical coefficient, taking into account Copa Libertadores and Copa Sudamericana results in the period 1960–2015 and 2002–2015 respectively.
3. Local tournament champion, with bonus points awarded to domestic league champions of the last 10 years.

For the group stage, the 32 teams were drawn into eight groups (Groups A–H) of four containing a team from each of the four pots. Teams from the same association could not be drawn into the same group, excluding the four winners of the third stage, which were allocated to Pot 4 and could be drawn into the same group with another team from the same association.

Group stage draw
Pot 1	Pot 2	Pot 3	Pot 4
(Brazil) Flamengo (2); (Brazil) Palmeiras (1); (Argentina) Boca Juniors (4); (Uruguay) Peñarol (5); (Uruguay) Nacional (8); (Ecuador) LDU Quito (10); (Brazil) Fluminense (11); (Ecuador) Independiente del Valle (16)	(Argentina) Lanús (21); (Paraguay) Libertad (17); (Argentina) Estudiantes (18); (Paraguay) Cerro Porteño (20); (Brazil) Corinthians (22); (Bolivia) Bolívar (23); (Brazil) Cruzeiro (29); (Peru) Universitario (32)	(Colombia) Junior (34); (Chile) Universidad Católica (35); (Argentina) Rosario Central (48); (Colombia) Santa Fe (53); (Bolivia) Always Ready (64); (Chile) Coquimbo Unido (82); (Venezuela) Deportivo La Guaira (114); (Peru) Cusco (142)	(Venezuela) Universidad Central (179); (Argentina) Platense (223); (Argentina) Independiente Rivadavia (No rank); (Brazil) Mirassol (No rank); (Colombia) Independiente Medellín (45); (Colombia) Deportes Tolima (57); (Peru) Sporting Cristal (38); (Ecuador) Barcelona (28)

Notes

1. ^{TH} The defending Copa Libertadores champions were automatically allocated to Group A and the position A1.
2. ^{CS} The defending Copa Sudamericana champions were seeded in Pot 2.
3. ^{Q3} The third stage winners were seeded in Pot 4.

The following are the four winners of the third stage of qualifying which joined the 28 direct entrants in the group stage.

Match	Third stage winners
G1	(Colombia) Independiente Medellín
G2	(Colombia) Deportes Tolima
G3	(Peru) Sporting Cristal
G4	(Ecuador) Barcelona

== Format ==
In the group stage, each group was played on a home-and-away round-robin basis. The winners and runners-up of each group advanced to the round of 16 of the final stages. The third-placed teams of each group entered the knockout round play-offs of the 2026 Copa Sudamericana.

=== Tiebreakers ===
Tiebreakers were changed starting from this edition, with head-to-head performance being prioritized over overall goal difference and goals scored. Disciplinary performance (red and yellow cards) was also included, removing away goals scored as well as placement in the CONMEBOL ranking as tiebreakers. The full order of tiebreaking criteria, according to Regulations Article 2.4.2, was as follows:

1. Points
2. Head-to-head points
3. Head-to-head goal difference
4. Head-to-head goals scored
5. Overall goal difference
6. Overall goals scored
7. Fewest red cards
8. Fewest yellow cards
9. Drawing of lots

== Schedule ==
The schedule of each matchday was as follows (Regulations Article 2.2.2).

Matchday	Dates	Matches
Matchday 1	7–9 April 2026	Team 4 vs. Team 2, Team 3 vs. Team 1
Matchday 2	14–16 April 2026	Team 2 vs. Team 3, Team 1 vs. Team 4
Matchday 3	28–30 April 2026	Team 2 vs. Team 1, Team 4 vs. Team 3
Matchday 4	5–7 May 2026	Team 3 vs. Team 2, Team 4 vs. Team 1
Matchday 5	19–21 May 2026	Team 1 vs. Team 2, Team 3 vs. Team 4
Matchday 6	26–28 May 2026	Team 1 vs. Team 3, Team 2 vs. Team 4

== Groups ==
=== Group A ===
Pos	Team	Pld	W	D	L	GF	GA	GD	Pts	Qualification	FLA	EST	DIM	CUS
1	(Brazil) Flamengo	6	5	1	0	14	2	+12	16	Advance to round of 16	—	1–0	4–1	3–0
2	(Argentina) Estudiantes	6	2	3	1	6	5	+1	9	Advance to round of 16	1–1	—	1–0	2–1
3	(Colombia) Independiente Medellín	6	2	1	3	6	11	−5	7	Transfer to Copa Sudamericana	0–3 (Note: The Independiente Medellín v Flamengo match was suspended at 0–0 in the 5th minute of play due to disturbances by Independiente Medellín fans. The match was abandoned after a one-hour wait, with CONMEBOL confirming its cancellation and referring the matter to its Disciplinary Commission, which subsequently awarded Flamengo a 3–0 win.)	1–1	—	1–0
4	(Peru) Cusco	6	0	1	5	4	12	−8	1		0–2	1–1	2–3	—

Source: CONMEBOL
Notes:
8 April 2026
19:00 UTC−5

Independiente Medellín (Colombia)	1–1	(Argentina) Estudiantes
F. Chaverra 63'	Report	Palacios 4'

Estadio Atanasio Girardot, Medellín
Referee: Alexis Herrera (Venezuela)
8 April 2026
19:30 UTC−5

Cusco (Peru)	0–2	(Brazil) Flamengo
	Report	Bruno Henrique 59'; De Arrascaeta 90+2'

Estadio Garcilaso, Cusco
Referee: Derlis López (Paraguay)

14 April 2026
19:00 UTC−3

Estudiantes (Argentina)	2–1	(Peru) Cusco
Farías 28'; Palacios 48'	Report	Colitto 31'

Estadio Jorge Luis Hirschi, La Plata
Referee: José Cabero (Chile)
16 April 2026
21:30 UTC−3

Flamengo (Brazil)	4–1	(Colombia) Independiente Medellín
Lucas Paquetá 15'; Bruno Henrique 45'; De Arrascaeta 49'; Pedro 90+6'	Report	González 40'

Estádio do Maracanã, Rio de Janeiro
Attendance: 55,311
Referee: Andrés Matonte (Uruguay)

29 April 2026
21:30 UTC−3

Estudiantes (Argentina)	1–1	(Brazil) Flamengo
Carrillo 55'	Report	Luiz Araújo 33'

Estadio Jorge Luis Hirschi, La Plata
Referee: Piero Maza (Chile)
30 April 2026
21:00 UTC−5

Independiente Medellín (Colombia)	1–0	(Peru) Cusco
Fydriszewski 87'	Report

Estadio Atanasio Girardot, Medellín
Referee: Gery Vargas (Bolivia)

6 May 2026
17:00 UTC−5

Cusco (Peru)	1–1	(Argentina) Estudiantes
Colitto 37'	Report	Palacios 58'

Estadio Garcilaso, Cusco
Referee: Guillermo Guerrero (Ecuador)
7 May 2026
19:30 UTC−5

Independiente Medellín (Colombia)	0–3 Awarded (Note: The Independiente Medellín v Flamengo match was suspended at 0–0 in the 5th minute of play due to disturbances by Independiente Medellín fans. The match was abandoned after a one-hour wait, with CONMEBOL confirming its cancellation and referring the matter to its Disciplinary Commission, which subsequently awarded Flamengo a 3–0 win.)	(Brazil) Flamengo

Estadio Atanasio Girardot, Medellín
Referee: Jesús Valenzuela (Venezuela)

20 May 2026
21:30 UTC−3

Flamengo (Brazil)	1–0	(Argentina) Estudiantes
Pedro 65'	Report

Estádio do Maracanã, Rio de Janeiro
Referee: Esteban Ostojich (Uruguay)
20 May 2026
21:00 UTC−5

Cusco (Peru)	2–3	(Colombia) Independiente Medellín
Choi 78'; Fuentes 90+4'	Report	Fydriszewski 13'; Perlaza 90+1'; Serna 90+7'

Estadio Garcilaso, Cusco
Referee: Fernando Véjar (Chile)

26 May 2026
21:30 UTC−3

Flamengo (Brazil)	3–0	(Peru) Cusco
Bruno Henrique 80', 84'; Lucas Paquetá 90+1' (pen.)	Report

Estádio do Maracanã, Rio de Janeiro
Referee: José Burgos (Uruguay)
26 May 2026
21:30 UTC−3

Estudiantes (Argentina)	1–0	(Colombia) Independiente Medellín
Amondarain 90+1'	Report

Estadio Jorge Luis Hirschi, La Plata
Referee: Juan Gabriel Benítez (Paraguay)

=== Group B ===
Pos	Team	Pld	W	D	L	GF	GA	GD	Pts	Qualification	COQ	TOL	NAC	UNI
1	(Chile) Coquimbo Unido	6	3	1	2	8	6	+2	10	Advance to round of 16	—	3–0	1–1	2–1
2	(Colombia) Deportes Tolima	6	2	2	2	7	6	+1	8 (Note: Head-to-head goal difference: Deportes Tolima +1, Nacional −1.)	Advance to round of 16	3–0	—	3–0	0–0
3	(Uruguay) Nacional	6	2	2	2	7	9	−2	8	Transfer to Copa Sudamericana	1–0	3–1	—	0–0
4	(Peru) Universitario	6	1	3	2	5	6	−1	6		0–2	0–0	4–2	—

Source: CONMEBOL
Notes:
7 April 2026
21:00 UTC−5

Deportes Tolima (Colombia)	0–0	(Peru) Universitario
	Report

Estadio Manuel Murillo Toro, Ibagué
Referee: Wilton Sampaio (Brazil)
8 April 2026
18:00 UTC−4

Coquimbo Unido (Chile)	1–1	(Uruguay) Nacional
Fernández 90+5'	Report	Coates 22'

Estadio Municipal Francisco Sánchez Rumoroso, Coquimbo
Referee: Raphael Claus (Brazil)

14 April 2026
19:00 UTC−3

Nacional (Uruguay)	3–1	(Colombia) Deportes Tolima
Gómez 48'; Coates 64'; López 87'	Report	Rovira 80'

Estadio Gran Parque Central, Montevideo
Referee: Yael Falcón Pérez (Argentina)
14 April 2026
21:00 UTC−5

Universitario (Peru)	0–2	(Chile) Coquimbo Unido
	Report	Zavala 13'; Johansen 49'

Estadio Monumental, Lima
Referee: Ramon Abatti (Brazil)

28 April 2026
21:00 UTC−5

Deportes Tolima (Colombia)	3–0	(Chile) Coquimbo Unido
Guzmán 59' (pen.); Sandoval 66'; González 78'	Report

Estadio Manuel Murillo Toro, Ibagué
Referee: Anderson Daronco (Brazil)
29 April 2026
21:00 UTC−5

Universitario (Peru)	4–2	(Uruguay) Nacional
Fara 40'; Valera 46'; Alzugaray 81'; Carabalí 90+1'	Report	Gómez 14' (pen.); Silvera 71'

Estadio Monumental, Lima
Referee: Carlos Benítez (Paraguay)

6 May 2026
21:00 UTC−5

Deportes Tolima (Colombia)	3–0	(Uruguay) Nacional
Sandoval 45+7' (pen.); Mosquera 78'; González 89'	Report

Estadio Manuel Murillo Toro, Ibagué
Referee: Raphael Claus (Brazil)
7 May 2026
20:00 UTC−4

Coquimbo Unido (Chile)	2–1	(Peru) Universitario
Vadalá 50', 72'	Report	Valera 33'

Estadio Municipal Francisco Sánchez Rumoroso, Coquimbo
Referee: Maximiliano Ramírez (Argentina)

19 May 2026
18:00 UTC−4

Coquimbo Unido (Chile)	3–0	(Colombia) Deportes Tolima
Fernández 27'; Zavala 45+4'; Johansen 55'	Report

Estadio Municipal Francisco Sánchez Rumoroso, Coquimbo
Referee: Wilton Sampaio (Brazil)
20 May 2026
19:00 UTC−3

Nacional (Uruguay)	0–0	(Peru) Universitario
	Report

Estadio Gran Parque Central, Montevideo
Referee: Darío Herrera (Argentina)

26 May 2026
21:30 UTC−3

Nacional (Uruguay)	1–0	(Chile) Coquimbo Unido
Gómez 7'	Report

Estadio Gran Parque Central, Montevideo
Referee: Paulo Zanovelli (Brazil)
26 May 2026
19:30 UTC−5

Universitario (Peru)	0–0	(Colombia) Deportes Tolima
	Report

Estadio Monumental, Lima
Referee: Maximiliano Ramírez (Argentina)

=== Group C ===
Pos	Team	Pld	W	D	L	GF	GA	GD	Pts	Qualification	IRI	FLU	BOL	DLG
1	(Argentina) Independiente Rivadavia	6	5	1	0	15	6	+9	16	Advance to round of 16	—	1–1	1–0	4–1
2	(Brazil) Fluminense	6	2	2	2	7	7	0	8	Advance to round of 16	1–2	—	2–1	3–1
3	(Bolivia) Bolívar	6	1	2	3	6	8	−2	5	Transfer to Copa Sudamericana	1–3	2–0	—	1–1
4	(Venezuela) Deportivo La Guaira	6	0	3	3	6	13	−7	3		2–4	0–0	1–1	—

Source: CONMEBOL
7 April 2026
19:00 UTC−3

Independiente Rivadavia (Argentina)	1–0	(Bolivia) Bolívar
Lampe 1' (o.g.)	Report

Estadio Malvinas Argentinas, Mendoza (Note: Independiente Rivadavia played their home matches at Estadio Malvinas Argentinas, Mendoza instead of their regular stadium Estadio Bautista Gargantini, Mendoza which did not meet CONMEBOL requirements.)
Referee: José Cabero (Chile)
7 April 2026
18:00 UTC−4

Deportivo La Guaira (Venezuela)	0–0	(Brazil) Fluminense
	Report

Estadio Olímpico de la UCV, Caracas
Referee: José Burgos (Uruguay)

14 April 2026
20:00 UTC−4

Bolívar (Bolivia)	1–1	(Venezuela) Deportivo La Guaira
Romero 79'	Report	Londoño 29'

Estadio Hernando Siles, La Paz
Referee: Anthony Díaz (Ecuador)
15 April 2026
21:30 UTC−3

Fluminense (Brazil)	1–2	(Argentina) Independiente Rivadavia
Arana 10'	Report	Sartori 37'; Arce 51'

Estádio do Maracanã, Rio de Janeiro
Attendance: 27,058
Referee: Jhon Ospina (Colombia)

30 April 2026
18:00 UTC−4

Bolívar (Bolivia)	2–0	(Brazil) Fluminense
Robson Matheus 6', 61'	Report

Estadio Hernando Siles, La Paz
Referee: Derlis López (Paraguay)
30 April 2026
19:00 UTC−3

Independiente Rivadavia (Argentina)	4–1	(Venezuela) Deportivo La Guaira
Arce 27', 45+2', 64'; Villa 45' (pen.)	Report	Ortiz 32'

Estadio Malvinas Argentinas, Mendoza
Referee: Augusto Menéndez (Peru)

6 May 2026
18:00 UTC−4

Deportivo La Guaira (Venezuela)	1–1	(Bolivia) Bolívar
Meza 31'	Report	Justiniano 90+4'

Estadio Olímpico de la UCV, Caracas
Referee: Bryan Loayza (Ecuador)
6 May 2026
21:30 UTC−3

Independiente Rivadavia (Argentina)	1–1	(Brazil) Fluminense
Arce 66'	Report	John Kennedy 90+1'

Estadio Malvinas Argentinas, Mendoza
Referee: Gustavo Tejera (Uruguay)

19 May 2026
19:00 UTC−3

Fluminense (Brazil)	2–1	(Bolivia) Bolívar
Acosta 6'; John Kennedy 70'	Report	Melgar 24'

Estádio do Maracanã, Rio de Janeiro
Referee: Andrés Matonte (Uruguay)
21 May 2026
18:00 UTC−4

Deportivo La Guaira (Venezuela)	2–4	(Argentina) Independiente Rivadavia
Osio 29'; Castellanos 80'	Report	Arce 20', 60', 76'; Villa 34'

Estadio Olímpico de la UCV, Caracas
Referee: Mario Díaz de Vivar (Paraguay)

27 May 2026
21:30 UTC−3

Fluminense (Brazil)	3–1	(Venezuela) Deportivo La Guaira
Savarino 10' (pen.); Hércules 28'; Canobbio 66'	Report	Londoño 12'

Estádio do Maracanã, Rio de Janeiro
Referee: José Cabero (Chile)
27 May 2026
20:30 UTC−4

Bolívar (Bolivia)	1–3	(Argentina) Independiente Rivadavia
Cauteruccio 55'	Report	Bucca 45+7'; Villa 90+2'; Crego 90+5'

Estadio Ramón Tahuichi Aguilera, Santa Cruz de la Sierra (Note: Bolívar played their home match against Independiente Rivadavia at Estadio Ramón Tahuichi Aguilera, Santa Cruz de la Sierra instead of their regular stadium Estadio Hernando Siles, La Paz due to the 2026 Bolivian protests.)
Referee: Guillermo Guerrero (Ecuador)

=== Group D ===
Pos	Team	Pld	W	D	L	GF	GA	GD	Pts	Qualification	UCA	CRU	BOC	BSC
1	(Chile) Universidad Católica	6	4	1	1	8	4	+4	13	Advance to round of 16	—	0–0	1–2	2–0
2	(Brazil) Cruzeiro	6	3	2	1	8	3	+5	11	Advance to round of 16	1–2	—	1–0	4–0
3	(Argentina) Boca Juniors	6	2	1	3	6	5	+1	7	Transfer to Copa Sudamericana	0–1	1–1	—	3–0
4	(Ecuador) Barcelona	6	1	0	5	2	12	−10	3		1–2	0–1	1–0	—

Source: CONMEBOL
7 April 2026
19:00 UTC−5

Barcelona (Ecuador)	0–1	(Brazil) Cruzeiro
	Report	Matheus Pereira 53'

Estadio Monumental Isidro Romero Carbo, Guayaquil
Referee: Juan Gabriel Benítez (Paraguay)
7 April 2026
20:30 UTC−4

Universidad Católica (Chile)	1–2	(Argentina) Boca Juniors
Díaz 83'	Report	Paredes 16'; Bareiro 65'

Claro Arena, Santiago
Referee: Gustavo Tejera (Uruguay)

14 April 2026
21:00 UTC−3

Boca Juniors (Argentina)	3–0	(Ecuador) Barcelona
Di Lollo 39'; Ascacíbar 81'; Herrera 90+4'	Report

La Bombonera, Buenos Aires
Referee: Wilmar Roldán (Colombia)
15 April 2026
19:00 UTC−3

Cruzeiro (Brazil)	1–2	(Chile) Universidad Católica
Matheus Pereira 60' (pen.)	Report	Giani 29'; Martínez 90+4'

Mineirão, Belo Horizonte
Attendance: 43,929
Referee: Carlos Betancur (Colombia)

28 April 2026
21:30 UTC−3

Cruzeiro (Brazil)	1–0	(Argentina) Boca Juniors
Villarreal 83'	Report

Mineirão, Belo Horizonte
Referee: Esteban Ostojich (Uruguay)
29 April 2026
19:00 UTC−5

Barcelona (Ecuador)	1–2	(Chile) Universidad Católica
Céliz 79'	Report	Zampedri 17'; Montes 22'

Estadio Monumental Isidro Romero Carbo, Guayaquil
Referee: Roberto Pérez (Peru)

5 May 2026
19:00 UTC−5

Barcelona (Ecuador)	1–0	(Argentina) Boca Juniors
Villalba 73'	Report

Estadio Monumental Isidro Romero Carbo, Guayaquil
Referee: Carlos Betancur (Colombia)
6 May 2026
22:00 UTC−4

Universidad Católica (Chile)	0–0	(Brazil) Cruzeiro
	Report

Claro Arena, Santiago
Referee: Andrés Rojas (Colombia)

19 May 2026
21:30 UTC−3

Boca Juniors (Argentina)	1–1	(Brazil) Cruzeiro
Merentiel 15'	Report	Fagner 54'

La Bombonera, Buenos Aires
Referee: Jesús Valenzuela (Venezuela)
21 May 2026
20:30 UTC−4

Universidad Católica (Chile)	2–0	(Ecuador) Barcelona
Zampedri 77', 84'	Report

Claro Arena, Santiago
Referee: Juan Gabriel Benítez (Paraguay)

28 May 2026
21:30 UTC−3

Boca Juniors (Argentina)	0–1	(Chile) Universidad Católica
	Report	Montes 34'

La Bombonera, Buenos Aires
Referee: Wilmar Roldán (Colombia)
28 May 2026
21:30 UTC−3

Cruzeiro (Brazil)	4–0	(Ecuador) Barcelona
Matheus Pereira 5', 71'; Christian 52'; Sinisterra 55'	Report

Mineirão, Belo Horizonte
Referee: Andrés Matonte (Uruguay)

=== Group E ===
Pos	Team	Pld	W	D	L	GF	GA	GD	Pts	Qualification	COR	PLA	SFE	PEÑ
1	(Brazil) Corinthians	6	3	2	1	8	4	+4	11	Advance to round of 16	—	0–2	2–0	2–0
2	(Argentina) Platense	6	3	1	2	8	7	+1	10	Advance to round of 16	0–2	—	2–1	1–1
3	(Colombia) Santa Fe	6	2	2	2	6	7	−1	8	Transfer to Copa Sudamericana	1–1	2–1	—	1–1
4	(Uruguay) Peñarol	6	0	3	3	4	8	−4	3		1–1	1–2	0–1	—

Source: CONMEBOL
9 April 2026
21:00 UTC−3

Platense (Argentina)	0–2	(Brazil) Corinthians
	Report	Kayke 53'; Yuri Alberto 70'

Estadio Ciudad de Vicente López, Florida
Referee: Piero Maza (Chile)
9 April 2026
21:00 UTC−5

Santa Fe (Colombia)	1–1	(Uruguay) Peñarol
Olivera 20'	Report	Arezo 59'

Estadio El Campín, Bogotá
Referee: Jesús Valenzuela (Venezuela)

15 April 2026
21:30 UTC−3

Corinthians (Brazil)	2–0	(Colombia) Santa Fe
Raniele 51'; Gustavo Henrique 80'	Report

Neo Química Arena, São Paulo
Attendance: 39,371
Referee: Juan Gabriel Benítez (Paraguay)
16 April 2026
21:30 UTC−3

Peñarol (Uruguay)	1–2	(Argentina) Platense
Arezo 58'	Report	Mainero 22'; Zapiola 63' (pen.)

Estadio Campeón del Siglo, Montevideo
Referee: Derlis López (Paraguay)

29 April 2026
19:00 UTC−3

Platense (Argentina)	2–1	(Colombia) Santa Fe
Nasif 57'; Mendía 63'	Report	Fagúndez 90+4'

Estadio Ciudad de Vicente López, Florida
Referee: Alexis Herrera (Venezuela)
30 April 2026
21:00 UTC−3

Corinthians (Brazil)	2–0	(Uruguay) Peñarol
Gustavo Henrique 11'; Lingard 25'	Report

Neo Química Arena, São Paulo
Referee: Cristian Garay (Chile)

6 May 2026
19:30 UTC−5

Santa Fe (Colombia)	1–1	(Brazil) Corinthians
Rodallega 59'	Report	Gustavo Henrique 90+3'

Estadio El Campín, Bogotá
Referee: Kevin Ortega (Peru)
7 May 2026
19:00 UTC−3

Platense (Argentina)	1–1	(Uruguay) Peñarol
Lagos 39'	Report	Batista 29'

Estadio Ciudad de Vicente López, Florida
Referee: Juan Gabriel Benítez (Paraguay)

19 May 2026
19:00 UTC−5

Santa Fe (Colombia)	2–1	(Argentina) Platense
Scarpeta 48'; Rodallega 71'	Report	Lotti 73'

Estadio El Campín, Bogotá
Referee: Cristian Garay (Chile)
21 May 2026
21:30 UTC−3

Peñarol (Uruguay)	1–1	(Brazil) Corinthians
Olivera 19'	Report	Labyad 63'

Estadio Campeón del Siglo, Montevideo
Referee: Piero Maza (Chile)

27 May 2026
21:30 UTC−3

Peñarol (Uruguay)	0–1	(Colombia) Santa Fe
	Report	Zapata 13'

Estadio Campeón del Siglo, Montevideo
Referee: Kevin Ortega (Peru)
27 May 2026
21:30 UTC−3

Corinthians (Brazil)	0–2	(Argentina) Platense
	Report	Zapiola 21' (pen.), 57'

Neo Química Arena, São Paulo
Referee: Alexis Herrera (Venezuela)

=== Group F ===
Pos	Team	Pld	W	D	L	GF	GA	GD	Pts	Qualification	CCP	PAL	CRI	JUN
1	(Paraguay) Cerro Porteño	6	4	1	1	6	2	+4	13	Advance to round of 16	—	1–1	2–0	1–0
2	(Brazil) Palmeiras	6	3	2	1	10	5	+5	11	Advance to round of 16	0–1	—	2–1	4–1
3	(Peru) Sporting Cristal	6	2	0	4	6	9	−3	6	Transfer to Copa Sudamericana	1–0	0–2	—	2–0
4	(Colombia) Junior	6	1	1	4	5	11	−6	4		0–1	1–1	3–2	—

Source: CONMEBOL
8 April 2026
19:30 UTC−5

Junior (Colombia)	1–1	(Brazil) Palmeiras
Gutiérrez 10' (pen.)	Report	Sosa 56'

Estadio Jaime Morón León, Cartagena (Note: Junior played their home matches at Estadio Jaime Morón León, Cartagena instead of their regular stadium Estadio Metropolitano Roberto Meléndez, Barranquilla which was closed for remodeling works to host the 2026 Copa Sudamericana final.)
Referee: Maximiliano Ramírez (Argentina) (Note: Referee Facundo Tello from Argentina, who was originally assigned to the Junior v Palmeiras match, was replaced by Maximiliano Ramírez from Argentina.)
8 April 2026
21:00 UTC−5

Sporting Cristal (Peru)	1–0	(Paraguay) Cerro Porteño
Vizeu 82'	Report

Estadio Miguel Grau, Callao (Note: The Sporting Cristal vs. Cerro Porteño match, originally scheduled to be played at Estadio Nacional, Lima, was first moved to Estadio Alejandro Villanueva, Lima after Estadio Nacional was temporarily closed due to the poor state of the field of play. On 3 April 2026, Estadio Alejandro Villanueva was also closed due to safety reasons, ultimately leading to move the match to Estadio Miguel Grau, Callao.)
Referee: Darío Herrera (Argentina)

14 April 2026
19:00 UTC−3

Cerro Porteño (Paraguay)	1–0	(Colombia) Junior
Torres 57'	Report

Estadio General Pablo Rojas, Asunción
Referee: Esteban Ostojich (Uruguay)
16 April 2026
19:00 UTC−3

Palmeiras (Brazil)	2–1	(Peru) Sporting Cristal
Murilo 27'; López 80' (pen.)	Report	J. González 41'

Allianz Parque, São Paulo
Attendance: 35,118
Referee: Piero Maza (Chile)

28 April 2026
21:00 UTC−5

Sporting Cristal (Peru)	2–0	(Colombia) Junior
S. González 52'; Cabellos 90+1'	Report

Estadio Alejandro Villanueva, Lima (Note: Sporting Cristal played their home matches against Junior and Palmeiras at Estadio Alejandro Villanueva, Lima (originally scheduled at Estadio Nacional, Lima) instead of their regular stadium Estadio Alberto Gallardo, Lima which did not meet CONMEBOL requirements.)
Attendance: 7,847
Referee: Maximiliano Ramírez (Argentina)
29 April 2026
21:30 UTC−3

Cerro Porteño (Paraguay)	1–1	(Brazil) Palmeiras
Carlos Miguel 72' (o.g.)	Report	Arias 33'

Estadio General Pablo Rojas, Asunción
Referee: Gustavo Tejera (Uruguay)

5 May 2026
17:00 UTC−5

Sporting Cristal (Peru)	0–2	(Brazil) Palmeiras
	Report	López 32'; Sosa 50'

Estadio Alejandro Villanueva, Lima
Referee: Darío Herrera (Argentina)
7 May 2026
21:00 UTC−5

Junior (Colombia)	0–1	(Paraguay) Cerro Porteño
	Report	Vegetti 13'

Estadio Jaime Morón León, Cartagena
Referee: Piero Maza (Chile)

20 May 2026
21:30 UTC−3

Palmeiras (Brazil)	0–1	(Paraguay) Cerro Porteño
	Report	Vegetti 48'

Nubank Parque, São Paulo
Referee: Yael Falcón Pérez (Argentina)
20 May 2026
21:00 UTC−5

Junior (Colombia)	3–2	(Peru) Sporting Cristal
Muriel 9', 36'; Pérez 28'	Report	Yotún 45+5'; Cazonatti 56'

Estadio Jaime Morón León, Cartagena
Referee: Leandro Rey Hilfer (Argentina)

28 May 2026
19:00 UTC−3

Palmeiras (Brazil)	4–1	(Colombia) Junior
Arias 6', 45'; Allan 40'; Andreas Pereira 51'	Report	Muriel 36'

Nubank Parque, São Paulo
Referee: Cristian Garay (Chile)
28 May 2026
19:00 UTC−3

Cerro Porteño (Paraguay)	2–0	(Peru) Sporting Cristal
Vegetti 51'; C. Domínguez 67' (pen.)	Report

Estadio General Pablo Rojas, Asunción
Referee: Piero Maza (Chile)

=== Group G ===
Pos	Team	Pld	W	D	L	GF	GA	GD	Pts	Qualification	LDQ	MIR	LAN	CAR
1	(Ecuador) LDU Quito	6	4	0	2	8	5	+3	12	Advance to round of 16	—	2–0	2–0	3–2
2	(Brazil) Mirassol	6	4	0	2	7	4	+3	12	Advance to round of 16	2–0	—	1–0	2–0
3	(Argentina) Lanús	6	3	0	3	3	7	−4	9	Transfer to Copa Sudamericana	1–0	1–0	—	1–0
4	(Bolivia) Always Ready	6	1	0	5	7	9	−2	3		0–1	1–2	4–0	—

Source: CONMEBOL
7 April 2026
20:00 UTC−4

Always Ready (Bolivia)	0–1	(Ecuador) LDU Quito
	Report	Villamil 90+4'

Estadio Municipal de Villa Ingenio, El Alto
Referee: Carlos Ortega (Colombia)
8 April 2026
19:00 UTC−3

Mirassol (Brazil)	1–0	(Argentina) Lanús
João Victor 60'	Report

Estádio José Maria de Campos Maia, Mirassol
Attendance: 6,595
Referee: Jhon Ospina (Colombia)

14 April 2026
21:00 UTC−5

LDU Quito (Ecuador)	2–0	(Brazil) Mirassol
Y. Quiñónez 6'; Quintero 34'	Report

Estadio Rodrigo Paz Delgado, Quito
Referee: Roberto Pérez (Peru)
16 April 2026
19:00 UTC−3

Lanús (Argentina)	1–0	(Bolivia) Always Ready
Valois 67'	Report

Estadio Ciudad de Lanús, Lanús
Referee: Alexis Herrera (Venezuela)

28 April 2026
19:00 UTC−3

Lanús (Argentina)	1–0	(Ecuador) LDU Quito
Cardozo 74'	Report

Estadio Ciudad de Lanús, Lanús
Referee: José Cabero (Chile)
29 April 2026
19:00 UTC−3

Mirassol (Brazil)	2–0	(Bolivia) Always Ready
Eduardo 10'; Alesson 80'	Report

Estádio José Maria de Campos Maia, Mirassol
Referee: Carlos Ortega (Colombia)

5 May 2026
20:30 UTC−4

Always Ready (Bolivia)	4–0	(Argentina) Lanús
Gómez 26'; Triverio 45'; Amoroso 46'; Suárez 89'	Report

Estadio Municipal de Villa Ingenio, El Alto
Referee: Roberto Pérez (Peru)
7 May 2026
19:00 UTC−3

Mirassol (Brazil)	2–0	(Ecuador) LDU Quito
Oliveira 47'; Reinaldo 61' (pen.)	Report

Estádio José Maria de Campos Maia, Mirassol
Referee: Alexis Herrera (Venezuela)

19 May 2026
21:00 UTC−3

Always Ready (Bolivia)	1–2	(Brazil) Mirassol
Maraude 75'	Report	Shaylon 11'; Nathan Fogaça 82'

Estadio La Huerta, Asunción (Paraguay) (Note: The Always Ready v Mirassol match was moved to Estadio La Huerta in Asunción (Paraguay) due to civil unrest in Bolivia.)
Referee: José Burgos (Uruguay)
20 May 2026
19:30 UTC−5

LDU Quito (Ecuador)	2–0	(Argentina) Lanús
Peña Biafore 74' (o.g.); Cornejo 90+1'	Report

Estadio Rodrigo Paz Delgado, Quito
Referee: Andrés Rojas (Colombia)

26 May 2026
17:00 UTC−5

LDU Quito (Ecuador)	3–2	(Bolivia) Always Ready
Y. Quiñónez 7'; Deyverson 77', 89'	Report	Triverio 18'; Nava 40'

Estadio Rodrigo Paz Delgado, Quito
Referee: Fernando Véjar (Chile)
26 May 2026
19:00 UTC−3

Lanús (Argentina)	1–0	(Brazil) Mirassol
Medina 22'	Report

Estadio Ciudad de Lanús, Lanús
Referee: Carlos Benítez (Paraguay)

=== Group H ===
Pos	Team	Pld	W	D	L	GF	GA	GD	Pts	Qualification	IDV	ROS	UCV	LIB
1	(Ecuador) Independiente del Valle	6	4	1	1	11	6	+5	13 (Note: Head-to-head points: Independiente del Valle 4, Rosario Central 1.)	Advance to round of 16	—	1–0	3–1	4–1
2	(Argentina) Rosario Central	6	4	1	1	9	1	+8	13	Advance to round of 16	0–0	—	4–0	1–0
3	(Venezuela) Universidad Central	6	3	0	3	7	11	−4	9	Transfer to Copa Sudamericana	2–0	0–3	—	3–1
4	(Paraguay) Libertad	6	0	0	6	4	13	−9	0		2–3	0–1	0–1	—

Source: CONMEBOL
Notes:
9 April 2026
18:00 UTC−4

Universidad Central (Venezuela)	3–1	(Paraguay) Libertad
Cuesta 30'; Murillo 88'; Solé 90+6' (pen.)	Report	Melgarejo 61'

Estadio Olímpico de la UCV, Caracas
Referee: Flavio de Souza (Brazil)
9 April 2026
19:00 UTC−3

Rosario Central (Argentina)	0–0	(Ecuador) Independiente del Valle
	Report

Estadio Gigante de Arroyito, Rosario
Referee: Wilmar Roldán (Colombia)

15 April 2026
19:00 UTC−3

Libertad (Paraguay)	0–1	(Argentina) Rosario Central
	Report	Copetti 83'

Estadio La Huerta, Asunción
Referee: Raphael Claus (Brazil)
15 April 2026
21:00 UTC−5

Independiente del Valle (Ecuador)	3–1	(Venezuela) Universidad Central
Alcívar 44'; González 45+5', 63'	Report	Bolívar 21'

Estadio Banco Guayaquil, Quito
Referee: Jordi Espinoza (Peru)

28 April 2026
19:00 UTC−3

Libertad (Paraguay)	2–3	(Ecuador) Independiente del Valle
Melgarejo 37', 85' (pen.)	Report	González 33', 51', 65'

Estadio La Huerta, Asunción
Referee: Carlos Betancur (Colombia)
28 April 2026
20:00 UTC−4

Universidad Central (Venezuela)	0–3	(Argentina) Rosario Central
	Report	Ovando 35'; Di María 53' (pen.); Copetti 90+3'

Estadio Olímpico de la UCV, Caracas
Referee: José Burgos (Uruguay)

5 May 2026
19:00 UTC−3

Rosario Central (Argentina)	1–0	(Paraguay) Libertad
Ovando 57'	Report

Estadio Gigante de Arroyito, Rosario
Referee: Wilton Sampaio (Brazil)
5 May 2026
20:00 UTC−4

Universidad Central (Venezuela)	2–0	(Ecuador) Independiente del Valle
Zapata 54'; Cuesta 67'	Report

Estadio Olímpico de la UCV, Caracas
Referee: Gery Vargas (Bolivia)

19 May 2026
19:00 UTC−3

Rosario Central (Argentina)	4–0	(Venezuela) Universidad Central
Véliz 22'; Pizarro 39'; Di María 71'; Ruben 88'	Report

Estadio Gigante de Arroyito, Rosario
Referee: Flavio de Souza (Brazil)
19 May 2026
21:00 UTC−5

Independiente del Valle (Ecuador)	4–1	(Paraguay) Libertad
Sornoza 38'; González 43'; Lerma 64'; Reasco 90+5'	Report	Melgarejo 45+3'

Estadio Banco Guayaquil, Quito
Referee: Anderson Daronco (Brazil)

27 May 2026
17:00 UTC−5

Independiente del Valle (Ecuador)	1–0	(Argentina) Rosario Central
Sornoza 64' (pen.)	Report

Estadio Banco Guayaquil, Quito
Referee: Raphael Claus (Brazil)
27 May 2026
19:00 UTC−3

Libertad (Paraguay)	0–1	(Venezuela) Universidad Central
	Report	Cuesta 62'

Estadio La Huerta, Asunción
Referee: Rafael Klein (Brazil)
