= 2026 Copa Libertadores final =

Final match of the 67th Copa Libertadores edition

- Promotional poster of the final
- Event: 2026 Copa Libertadores
Palmeiras	Estudiantes
(Brazil)	(Argentina)
- Date: 28 November 2026
- Venue: Estadio Centenario, Montevideo
- Referee: Jesús Valenzuela (Venezuela)

The 2026 Copa Libertadores final will be the final match of the 2026 Copa Libertadores, the 67th edition of South America's premier club association football tournament organized by CONMEBOL. The match will be played by Brazilian club Palmeiras and Argentine team Estudiantes on 28 November 2026 at Estadio Centenario in Montevideo, Uruguay.

The winners will qualify for the 2026 FIFA Intercontinental Cup and the 2029 FIFA Club World Cup, as well as the 2027 Recopa Sudamericana and the 2027 Copa Libertadores group stage.

== Venue ==
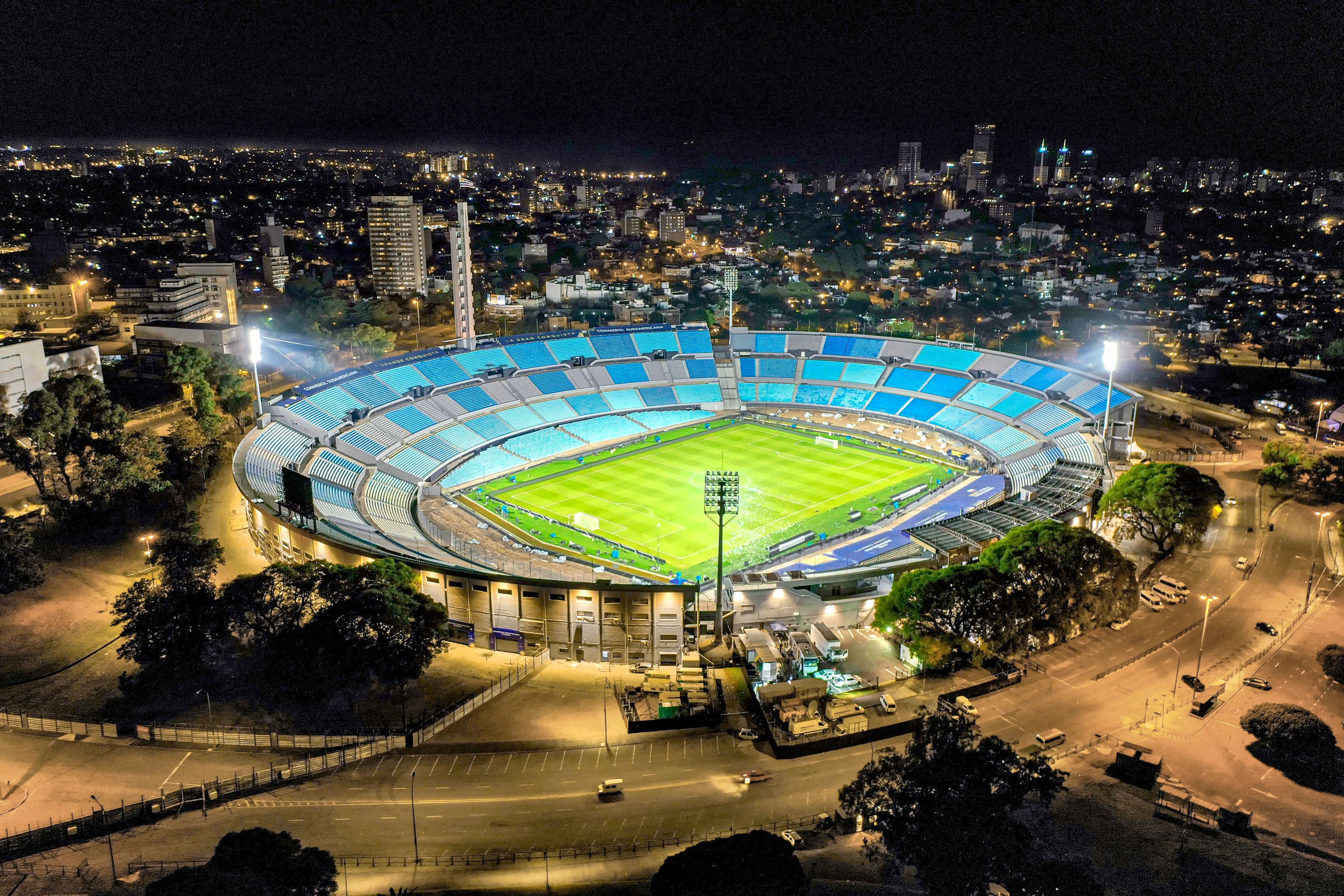
The Estadio Centenario in Montevideo will host the final.

The venue was confirmed by CONMEBOL president Alejandro Domínguez on 29 November 2025, prior to the 2025 final. It will take place at the Estadio Centenario in Montevideo, Uruguay. Montevideo was the sole candidate city to host the final, making the decision straightforward for CONMEBOL.

The stadium will host a single-match Copa Libertadores final for the second time—the first being the 2021 final—joining the Maracanã in Rio de Janeiro (2020 and 2023) and the Estadio Monumental in Lima (2019 and 2025) as stadiums to host more than one single-leg final.

Our council decided that next year's final will be held in Montevideo. It will be at the Centenario, right where the 2030 FIFA World Cup will begin.

— Alejandro Domínguez, CONMEBOL president, in an interview with ESPN,

The stadium has hosted several landmark matches in South American football. It hosted the very first match in Copa Libertadores history during the 1960 edition on 19 April 1960, between Peñarol and Jorge Wilstermann (a 7–1 victory for the Uruguayan side). It also hosted the first leg of the inaugural final on 12 June 1960, a 1–1 draw between Peñarol and Olimpia, which secured Peñarol's title as the first tournament champions after winning the away leg 1–0. A total of 15 final matches were played at the stadium through 2011, when Peñarol drew 0–0 with Santos in the last two-legged final series played in Uruguay (with Santos going on to win the title).

== Teams ==
This will be the eight appearance in a Copa Libertadores final for Palmeiras, who won three of those in 1999, 2020, and 2021, the latter of which was also played at Estadio Centenario. The Brazilian side qualified for its second final in a row and fourth in seven years. In Estudiantes' case, this will be their sixth Copa Libertadores final, with three titles in a row from 1968 to 1970 and only one defeat to Uruguayan side Nacional in 1971. Their most recent appearance in the decisive series of the competition was in 2009, when they defeated Cruzeiro.

This will also be the fourth Copa Libertadores match between Palmeiras and Estudiantes, as well as the second time both teams will face each other in a Copa Libertadores final, with both having played the final series of the 1968 edition. The first leg was played on 2 May in La Plata, and it ended in a 2–1 win for the Argentine side with goals by Juan Ramón Verón and Eduardo Flores for Estudiantes, and Servílio scoring for the Brazilian team. The second leg was held five days later at Pacaembu Stadium in São Paulo, in which Palmeiras won 3–1 with a brace by Tupãzinho and another goal by Rinaldo, with Verón scoring once again for Estudiantes. Since each team won one match in the series, a tiebreaker match was played on 16 May at Estadio Centenario in Montevideo, which ended with Estudiantes winning 2–0 with goals by Felipe Ribaudo and Verón, thus claiming their first Copa Libertadores title.

Team	Previous finals appearances (bold indicates winners)
(Brazil) Palmeiras	7 (1961, 1968, **1999**, 2000, **2020**, **2021**, 2025)
(Argentina) Estudiantes	5 (**1968**, **1969**, **1970**, 1971, **2009**)

== Road to the final ==
Note: In all scores below, the score of the home team is given first.

(Brazil) Palmeiras			Round	(Argentina) Estudiantes		
Opponent	Venue	Score		Opponent	Venue	Score
Bye			Qualifying stages	Bye		
Group F			Group stage	Group A		
(Colombia) Junior	Away	1–1	Group stage	(Colombia) Independiente Medellín	Away	1–1
(Peru) Sporting Cristal	Home	2–1	Group stage	(Peru) Cusco	Home	2–1
(Paraguay) Cerro Porteño	Away	1–1	Group stage	(Brazil) Flamengo	Home	1–1
(Peru) Sporting Cristal	Away	0–2	Group stage	(Peru) Cusco	Away	1–1
(Paraguay) Cerro Porteño	Home	0–1	Group stage	(Brazil) Flamengo	Away	1–0
(Colombia) Junior	Home	4–1	Group stage	(Colombia) Independiente Medellín	Home	1–0
Pos / Team / Pld / Pts; 1 / (Paraguay) Cerro Porteño / 6 / 13; 2 / (Brazil) Palmeiras / 6 / 11; 3 / (Peru) Sporting Cristal / 6 / 6; 4 / (Colombia) Junior / 6 / 4; Source: CONMEBOL			Group stage	Pos / Team / Pld / Pts; 1 / (Brazil) Flamengo / 6 / 16; 2 / (Argentina) Estudiantes / 6 / 9; 3 / (Colombia) Independiente Medellín / 6 / 7; 4 / (Peru) Cusco / 6 / 1; Source: CONMEBOL		
Seed 11			Final stages	Seed 14		
(Paraguay) Cerro Porteño (won 2–1 on aggregate)	Home	1–1	Round of 16	(Chile) Universidad Católica (won 4–1 on aggregate)	Home	1–1
(Paraguay) Cerro Porteño (won 2–1 on aggregate)	Away	0–1	Round of 16	(Chile) Universidad Católica (won 4–1 on aggregate)	Away	0–3
(Ecuador) LDU Quito (tied 3–3 on aggregate, won on penalties)	Home	1–0	Quarter-finals	(Brazil) Corinthians (won 2–1 on aggregate)	Home	1–1
(Ecuador) LDU Quito (tied 3–3 on aggregate, won on penalties)	Away	3–2 (3–4 p)	Quarter-finals	(Brazil) Corinthians (won 2–1 on aggregate)	Away	0–1
(Brazil) Fluminense (tied 2–2 on aggregate, won on penalties)	Away	1–2	Semi-finals	(Brazil) Flamengo (tied 0–0 on aggregate, won on penalties)	Home	0–0
(Brazil) Fluminense (tied 2–2 on aggregate, won on penalties)	Home	0–1 (5–3 p)	Semi-finals	(Brazil) Flamengo (tied 0–0 on aggregate, won on penalties)	Away	0–0 (2–3 p)

== Format ==
The final will be played as a single match at a pre-selected venue, with the higher-seeded team designated as the "home" team for administrative purposes. If scores are level after full time, 30 minutes of extra time will be played. If still tied after extra time, a penalty shoot-out will be used to determine the winner.

== Prize money ==
The champion will receive $25 million USD —$1 million more than the previous edition. In total accumulated prize money across all stages, the winner will earn up to $40 million USD. The runner-up will receive the same amount as in the previous edition, alongside unchanged prize structures for earlier rounds.

== Halftime show ==
For the first time in the history of the Copa Libertadores, a halftime show was scheduled to take place during the match, featuring Brazilian DJ and singer Pedro Sampaio. CONMEBOL stated that the seven-minute performance would take place off the pitch, respecting the sporting schedule and keeping football as the main focus of the evening.

== Match ==
=== Details ===
28 November 2026
17:00 UTC−3

Palmeiras (Brazil)	v	(Argentina) Estudiantes

Estadio Centenario, Montevideo
Referee: Jesús Valenzuela (Venezuela)

Palmeiras	Estudiantes

Assistant referees:
Jorge Urrego (Venezuela)
Tulio Moreno (Venezuela)
Fourth official:
Alexis Herrera (Venezuela)
Fifth official:
Jhon Gallego (Colombia)
Video assistant referee:
Juan Soto (Venezuela)
Assistant video assistant referees:
Yender Herrera (Venezuela)
Alexander Guzmán (Colombia)
David Rodríguez (Colombia)

Match rules:
- 90 minutes
- 30 minutes of extra time if necessary
- Penalty shoot-out if scores still level
- Twelve named substitutes
- Maximum of five substitutions, with a sixth allowed in extra time

== See also ==
- 2026 Copa Sudamericana final
- 1968 Copa Libertadores finals – contested by the same teams
