= 2026 Copa Libertadores final stages =

The 2026 Copa Libertadores final stages are being played from 11 August to 28 November 2026. A total of 16 teams compete in the final stages deciding the champions of the 2026 Copa Libertadores, with the final to be played at Estadio Centenario in Montevideo, Uruguay.

== Qualified teams ==
The winners and runners-up of each of the eight groups in the group stage advanced to the round of 16.

| Group | Winners | Runners-up |
|---|---|---|
| A | (Brazil) Flamengo | (Argentina) Estudiantes |
| B | (Chile) Coquimbo Unido | (Colombia) Deportes Tolima |
| C | (Argentina) Independiente Rivadavia | (Brazil) Fluminense |
| D | (Chile) Universidad Católica | (Brazil) Cruzeiro |
| E | (Brazil) Corinthians | (Argentina) Platense |
| F | (Paraguay) Cerro Porteño | (Brazil) Palmeiras |
| G | (Ecuador) LDU Quito | (Brazil) Mirassol |
| H | (Ecuador) Independiente del Valle | (Argentina) Rosario Central |

=== Seeding ===
Starting from the round of 16, the teams were seeded according to their results in the group stage, with the group winners (Pot 1) seeded 1–8, and the group runners-up (Pot 2) seeded 9–16.

| Seed | Grp | Team | Pld | W | D | L | GF | GA | GD | Pts | Round of 16 draw |
|---|---|---|---|---|---|---|---|---|---|---|---|
| 1 | A | (Brazil) Flamengo | 6 | 5 | 1 | 0 | 14 | 2 | +12 | 16 | Pot 1 |
| 2 | C | (Argentina) Independiente Rivadavia | 6 | 5 | 1 | 0 | 15 | 6 | +9 | 16 | Pot 1 |
| 3 | H | (Ecuador) Independiente del Valle | 6 | 4 | 1 | 1 | 11 | 6 | +5 | 13 | Pot 1 |
| 4 | D | (Chile) Universidad Católica | 6 | 4 | 1 | 1 | 8 | 4 | +4 | 13 | Pot 1 |
| 5 | F | (Paraguay) Cerro Porteño | 6 | 4 | 1 | 1 | 6 | 2 | +4 | 13 | Pot 1 |
| 6 | G | (Ecuador) LDU Quito | 6 | 4 | 0 | 2 | 8 | 5 | +3 | 12 | Pot 1 |
| 7 | E | (Brazil) Corinthians | 6 | 3 | 2 | 1 | 8 | 4 | +4 | 11 | Pot 1 |
| 8 | B | (Chile) Coquimbo Unido | 6 | 3 | 1 | 2 | 8 | 6 | +2 | 10 | Pot 1 |
| 9 | H | (Argentina) Rosario Central | 6 | 4 | 1 | 1 | 9 | 1 | +8 | 13 | Pot 2 |
| 10 | G | (Brazil) Mirassol | 6 | 4 | 0 | 2 | 7 | 4 | +3 | 12 | Pot 2 |
| 11 | F | (Brazil) Palmeiras | 6 | 3 | 2 | 1 | 10 | 5 | +5 | 11 | Pot 2 |
| 12 | D | (Brazil) Cruzeiro | 6 | 3 | 2 | 1 | 8 | 3 | +5 | 11 | Pot 2 |
| 13 | E | (Argentina) Platense | 6 | 3 | 1 | 2 | 8 | 7 | +1 | 10 | Pot 2 |
| 14 | A | (Argentina) Estudiantes | 6 | 2 | 3 | 1 | 6 | 5 | +1 | 9 | Pot 2 |
| 15 | B | (Colombia) Deportes Tolima | 6 | 2 | 2 | 2 | 7 | 6 | +1 | 8 | Pot 2 |
| 16 | C | (Brazil) Fluminense | 6 | 2 | 2 | 2 | 7 | 7 | 0 | 8 | Pot 2 |

Source: CONMEBOL
Rules for classification: 1) Higher position in group; 2) Points; 3) Goal difference; 4) Goals scored; 5) Fewest number of red cards; 6) Fewest number of yellow cards; 7) Drawing of lots (Regulations Article 2.4.2).

== Format ==
Starting from the round of 16, the teams play a single-elimination tournament with the following rules:

- In the round of 16, quarter-finals and semi-finals, each tie was played on a home-and-away two-legged basis, with the higher-seeded team hosting the second leg (Regulations Article 2.2.3.2). If tied on aggregate, extra time was not played, and a penalty shoot-out was used to determine the winners (Regulations Article 2.4.3).
- The final is played as a single match at a venue pre-selected by CONMEBOL, with the higher-seeded team designated as the "home" team for administrative purposes (Regulations Article 2.2.3.5). If tied after regulation, 30 minutes of extra time will be played. If still tied after extra time, a penalty shoot-out will be used to determine the winners (Regulations Article 2.4.4).

== Draw ==
The draw for the round of 16 was held on 29 May 2026, 12:00 PYT (UTC−3) at the CONMEBOL headquarters in Luque, Paraguay. For the round of 16, the 16 teams were drawn into eight ties (A–H) between a group winner (Pot 1) and a group runner-up (Pot 2), with the group winners hosting the second leg. Teams from the same association or the same group could be drawn into the same tie (Regulations Article 2.2.3.2).

== Bracket ==
The bracket starting from the round of 16 was determined as follows:

| Round | Matchups |
|---|---|
| Round of 16 | (Group winners host second leg, matchups decided by draw): Match A; Match B; Match C; Match D; Match E; Match F; Match G; Match H |
| Quarter-finals | (Higher-seeded team host second leg): Match S1: Winner A vs. Winner H; Match S2: Winner B vs. Winner G; Match S3: Winner C vs. Winner F; Match S4: Winner D vs. Winner E |
| Semi-finals | (Higher-seeded team host second leg): Match F1: Winner S1 vs. Winner S4; Match F2: Winner S2 vs. Winner S3 |
| Final | (Higher-seeded team designated as "home" team): Winner F1 vs. Winner F2 |

The bracket was decided based on the round of 16 draw, which was held on 29 May 2026.

Round of 16
16 | (Brazil) Fluminense (p) | 0 | 1 | 1 (5)
2 | (Argentina) Independiente Rivadavia | 0 | 1 | 1 (4)
13 | (Argentina) Platense (p) | 1 | 0 | 1 (7)
8 | (Chile) Coquimbo Unido | 1 | 0 | 1 (6)
11 | (Brazil) Palmeiras | 1 | 1 | 2
5 | (Paraguay) Cerro Porteño | 1 | 0 | 1
10 | (Brazil) Mirassol | 1 | 0 | 1 (4)
6 | (Ecuador) LDU Quito (p) | 1 | 0 | 1 (5)
14 | (Argentina) Estudiantes | 1 | 3 | 4
4 | (Chile) Universidad Católica | 1 | 0 | 1
9 | (Argentina) Rosario Central | 0 | 0 | 0
7 | (Brazil) Corinthians | 0 | 1 | 1
15 | (Colombia) Deportes Tolima | 0 | 1 | 1
3 | (Ecuador) Independiente del Valle | 1 | 3 | 4
12 | (Brazil) Cruzeiro | 1 | 1 | 2
1 | (Brazil) Flamengo | 1 | 2 | 3

Quarter-finals
16 | (Brazil) Fluminense | 2 | 1 | 3
13 | (Argentina) Platense | 0 | 2 | 2
11 | (Brazil) Palmeiras (p) | 1 | 2 | 3 (4)
6 | (Ecuador) LDU Quito | 0 | 3 | 3 (3)
14 | (Argentina) Estudiantes | 1 | 1 | 2
7 | (Brazil) Corinthians | 1 | 0 | 1
3 | (Ecuador) Independiente del Valle | 0 | 1 | 1
1 | (Brazil) Flamengo | 2 | 1 | 3

Semi-finals
16 | (Brazil) Fluminense | 1 | 1 | 2 (3)
11 | (Brazil) Palmeiras (p) | 2 | 0 | 2 (5)
14 | (Argentina) Estudiantes (p) | 0 | 0 | 0 (3)
1 | (Brazil) Flamengo | 0 | 0 | 0 (2)

Final
28 November – Montevideo
11 | (Brazil) Palmeiras
14 | (Argentina) Estudiantes

== Round of 16 ==
=== Summary ===
The first legs were played on 11–13 and 18 August, and the second legs were played on 18–20 and 25 August 2026.

| Team 1 | Agg. | Team 2 | 1st leg | 2nd leg |
|---|---|---|---|---|
| Estudiantes (Argentina) | 4–1 | (Chile) Universidad Católica | 1–1 | 3–0 |
| Mirassol (Brazil) | 1–1 (4–5 p) | (Ecuador) LDU Quito | 1–1 | 0–0 |
| Fluminense (Brazil) | 1–1 (5–4 p) | (Argentina) Independiente Rivadavia | 0–0 | 1–1 |
| Deportes Tolima (Colombia) | 1–4 | (Ecuador) Independiente del Valle | 0–1 | 1–3 |
| Cruzeiro (Brazil) | 2–3 | (Brazil) Flamengo | 1–1 | 1–2 |
| Platense (Argentina) | 1–1 (7–6 p) | (Chile) Coquimbo Unido | 1–1 | 0–0 |
| Palmeiras (Brazil) | 2–1 | (Paraguay) Cerro Porteño | 1–1 | 1–0 |
| Rosario Central (Argentina) | 0–1 | (Brazil) Corinthians | 0–0 | 0–1 |

=== Matches ===
11 August 2026
21:30 UTC−3

| Estudiantes (Argentina) | 1–1 | (Chile) Universidad Católica |
|---|---|---|
| Tobio Burgos 4' | Report | Zampedri 80' |

Estadio Jorge Luis Hirschi, La Plata
Referee: Raphael Claus (Brazil)
18 August 2026
20:30 UTC−4

| Universidad Católica (Chile) | 0–3 | (Argentina) Estudiantes |
|---|---|---|
| | Report | Correa 44'; Carrillo 53', 83' |

Claro Arena, Santiago
Referee: Wilmar Roldán (Colombia)

Estudiantes won 4–1 on aggregate and advanced to the quarter-finals (Match S1).

13 August 2026
19:00 UTC−3

| Mirassol (Brazil) | 1–1 | (Ecuador) LDU Quito |
|---|---|---|
| Eduardo 15' | Report | Estrada 82' |

Estádio José Maria de Campos Maia, Mirassol
Referee: Alexis Herrera (Venezuela)
20 August 2026
17:00 UTC−5

| LDU Quito (Ecuador) | 0–0 | (Brazil) Mirassol |
|---|---|---|
| | Report |
Penalties
| Deyverson (penalty scored); Pretell (penalty scored); Estrada (penalty scored); Allala (penalty scored); Cornejo (penalty scored) | 5–4 | (penalty missed) Victor Luis; (penalty scored) Alesson; (penalty scored) Carlos Eduardo; (penalty scored) Neto Moura; (penalty scored) Bruno Santos |

Estadio Rodrigo Paz Delgado, Quito
Referee: Yael Falcón Pérez (Argentina)

Tied 1–1 on aggregate, LDU Quito won on penalties and advanced to the quarter-finals (Match S2).

11 August 2026
19:00 UTC−3

| Fluminense (Brazil) | 0–0 | (Argentina) Independiente Rivadavia |
|---|---|---|
| | Report |

Estádio do Maracanã, Rio de Janeiro
Referee: Cristián Garay (Chile)
18 August 2026
19:00 UTC−3

| Independiente Rivadavia (Argentina) | 1–1 | (Brazil) Fluminense |
|---|---|---|
| Arce 90+7' (pen.) | Report | Serna 75' |
Penalties
| Fernández (penalty scored); Villalba (penalty scored); Florentín (penalty missed); Salas (penalty scored); Arce (penalty scored); Atencio (penalty missed) | 4–5 | (penalty scored) Thiago Silva; (penalty missed) Acosta; (penalty scored) Renê; (penalty scored) Hércules; (penalty scored) Martinelli; (penalty scored) Guga |

Estadio Malvinas Argentinas, Mendoza (Note: Independiente Rivadavia played their home match at Estadio Malvinas Argentinas, Mendoza instead of their regular stadium Estadio Bautista Gargantini, Mendoza which did not meet CONMEBOL requirements.)
Referee: Andrés Rojas (Colombia)

Tied 1–1 on aggregate, Fluminense won on penalties and advanced to the quarter-finals (Match S3).

18 August 2026 (Note: Both legs of the Deportes Tolima v Independiente del Valle series, originally scheduled for 11 and 18 August 2026, were postponed for one week due to the 2026 Colombia earthquake.)
19:30 UTC−5

| Deportes Tolima (Colombia) | 0–1 | (Ecuador) Independiente del Valle |
|---|---|---|
| | Report | Rodríguez 11' |

Estadio Manuel Murillo Toro, Ibagué
Referee: Wilton Sampaio (Brazil)
25 August 2026
19:30 UTC−5

| Independiente del Valle (Ecuador) | 3–1 | (Colombia) Deportes Tolima |
|---|---|---|
| Romero 59'; González 70'; Perelló 90+5' | Report | Hernández 84' |

Estadio Banco Guayaquil, Quito
Referee: Darío Herrera (Argentina)

Independiente del Valle won 4–1 on aggregate and advanced to the quarter-finals (Match S4).

12 August 2026
21:30 UTC−3

| Cruzeiro (Brazil) | 1–1 | (Brazil) Flamengo |
|---|---|---|
| Arroyo 53' | Report | Lucas Paquetá 67' |

Mineirão, Belo Horizonte
Referee: Yael Falcón Pérez (Argentina)
19 August 2026
21:30 UTC−3

| Flamengo (Brazil) | 2–1 | (Brazil) Cruzeiro |
|---|---|---|
| De Arrascaeta 35'; Samuel Lino 62' | Report | Romero 51' |

Estádio do Maracanã, Rio de Janeiro
Referee: Gustavo Tejera (Uruguay)

Flamengo won 3–2 on aggregate and advanced to the quarter-finals (Match S4).

12 August 2026
19:00 UTC−3

| Platense (Argentina) | 1–1 | (Chile) Coquimbo Unido |
|---|---|---|
| Giménez 35' | Report | Vadalá 90+4' |

Estadio Ciudad de Vicente López, Florida
Referee: Juan Gabriel Benítez (Paraguay)
19 August 2026
18:00 UTC−4

| Coquimbo Unido (Chile) | 0–0 | (Argentina) Platense |
|---|---|---|
| | Report |
Penalties
| Galani (penalty scored); Johansen (penalty scored); Hernández (penalty scored); Cornejo (penalty scored); Sánchez (penalty scored); Azócar (penalty scored); Cordero (penalty missed) | 6–7 | (penalty scored) Lagos; (penalty scored) Mendía; (penalty scored) López; (penalty scored) Giménez; (penalty scored) Zapiola; (penalty scored) Cozzani; (penalty scored) Barrios |

Estadio Municipal Francisco Sánchez Rumoroso, Coquimbo
Referee: Roberto Pérez (Peru)

Tied 1–1 on aggregate, Platense won on penalties and advanced to the quarter-finals (Match S3).

12 August 2026
19:00 UTC−3

| Palmeiras (Brazil) | 1–1 | (Paraguay) Cerro Porteño |
|---|---|---|
| López 82' | Report | Carlos Miguel 90+3' (o.g.) |

Nubank Parque, São Paulo
Referee: Gustavo Tejera (Uruguay)
19 August 2026
19:00 UTC−3

| Cerro Porteño (Paraguay) | 0–1 | (Brazil) Palmeiras |
|---|---|---|
| | Report | Gómez 41' |

Estadio General Pablo Rojas, Asunción
Referee: Facundo Tello (Argentina)

Palmeiras won 2–1 on aggregate and advanced to the quarter-finals (Match S2).

13 August 2026
21:30 UTC−3

| Rosario Central (Argentina) | 0–0 | (Brazil) Corinthians |
|---|---|---|
| | Report |

Estadio Gigante de Arroyito, Rosario
Referee: Andrés Matonte (Uruguay)
20 August 2026
21:30 UTC−3

| Corinthians (Brazil) | 1–0 | (Argentina) Rosario Central |
|---|---|---|
| Bidon 80' | Report |

Neo Química Arena, São Paulo
Referee: Alexis Herrera (Venezuela)

Corinthians won 1–0 on aggregate and advanced to the quarter-finals (Match S1).

== Quarter-finals ==
=== Summary ===
The first legs were played on 8–10 September, and the second legs were played on 15–17 September 2026.

| Team 1 | Agg. | Team 2 | 1st leg | 2nd leg |
|---|---|---|---|---|
| Estudiantes (Argentina) | 2–1 | (Brazil) Corinthians | 1–1 | 1–0 |
| Palmeiras (Brazil) | 3–3 (4–3 p) | (Ecuador) LDU Quito | 1–0 | 2–3 |
| Fluminense (Brazil) | 3–2 | (Argentina) Platense | 2–0 | 1–2 |
| Independiente del Valle (Ecuador) | 1–3 | (Brazil) Flamengo | 0–2 | 1–1 |

=== Matches ===
9 September 2026
21:30 UTC−3

| Estudiantes (Argentina) | 1–1 | (Brazil) Corinthians |
|---|---|---|
| Castro 4' | Report | Kaio César 49' |

Estadio Jorge Luis Hirschi, La Plata
Referee: Esteban Ostojich (Uruguay)
16 September 2026
21:30 UTC−3

| Corinthians (Brazil) | 0–1 | (Argentina) Estudiantes |
|---|---|---|
| | Report | Castro 87' |

Neo Química Arena, São Paulo
Referee: Jesús Valenzuela (Venezuela)

Estudiantes won 2–1 on aggregate and advanced to the semi-finals (Match F1).

9 September 2026
19:00 UTC−3

| Palmeiras (Brazil) | 1–0 | (Ecuador) LDU Quito |
|---|---|---|
| Giay 26' | Report |

Nubank Parque, São Paulo
Referee: Jesús Valenzuela (Venezuela)
16 September 2026
17:00 UTC−5

| LDU Quito (Ecuador) | 3–2 | (Brazil) Palmeiras |
|---|---|---|
| Segovia 15'; Estrada 90', 90+3' | Report | Marlon Freitas 10'; Vitor Roque 73' (pen.) |
Penalties
| Deyverson (penalty scored); L. Rodríguez (penalty missed); Estrada (penalty scored); Cornejo (penalty scored); Segovia (penalty missed) | 3–4 | (penalty scored) Vitor Roque; (penalty scored) Maurício; (penalty scored) Piquerez; (penalty missed) Lucas Evangelista; (penalty scored) Felipe Anderson |

Estadio Rodrigo Paz Delgado, Quito
Referee: Wilmar Roldán (Colombia)

Tied 3–3 on aggregate, Palmeiras won on penalties and advanced to the semi-finals (Match F2).

8 September 2026
19:00 UTC−3

| Fluminense (Brazil) | 2–0 | (Argentina) Platense |
|---|---|---|
| Nonato 21'; Hulk 31' | Report |

Estádio do Maracanã, Rio de Janeiro
Referee: Andrés Matonte (Uruguay)
15 September 2026
19:00 UTC−3

| Platense (Argentina) | 2–1 | (Brazil) Fluminense |
|---|---|---|
| Mainero 30'; Sepúlveda 45+2' | Report | Canobbio 57' |

Estadio Ciudad de Vicente López, Florida
Referee: Cristián Garay (Chile)

Fluminense won 3–2 on aggregate and advanced to the semi-finals (Match F2).

10 September 2026
19:30 UTC−5

| Independiente del Valle (Ecuador) | 0–2 | (Brazil) Flamengo |
|---|---|---|
| | Report | Bruno Henrique 61'; Léo Pereira 75' |

Estadio Olímpico Atahualpa, Quito (Note: Independiente del Valle played their quarter-finals home match at Estadio Olímpico Atahualpa, Quito instead of their regular stadium Estadio Banco Guayaquil, Quito which did not meet capacity requirements for this round.)
Referee: Facundo Tello (Argentina)
17 September 2026
21:30 UTC−3

| Flamengo (Brazil) | 1–1 | (Ecuador) Independiente del Valle |
|---|---|---|
| De Arrascaeta 83' | Report | Reasco 31' |

Estádio do Maracanã, Rio de Janeiro
Referee: Andrés Matonte (Uruguay)

Flamengo won 3–1 on aggregate and advanced to the semi-finals (Match F1).

== Semi-finals ==
=== Summary ===
The first legs were played on 14 and 15 October, and the second legs were played on 21 and 22 October 2026.

| Team 1 | Agg. | Team 2 | 1st leg | 2nd leg |
|---|---|---|---|---|
| Estudiantes (Argentina) | 0–0 (3–2 p) | (Brazil) Flamengo | 0–0 | 0–0 |
| Fluminense (Brazil) | 2–2 (3–5 p) | (Brazil) Palmeiras | 1–2 | 1–0 |

=== Matches ===
15 October 2026
21:30 UTC−3

| Estudiantes (Argentina) | 0–0 | (Brazil) Flamengo |
|---|---|---|
| | Report |

Estadio Jorge Luis Hirschi, La Plata
Referee: Juan Gabriel Benítez (Paraguay)
22 October 2026
21:30 UTC−3

| Flamengo (Brazil) | 0–0 | (Argentina) Estudiantes |
|---|---|---|
| | Report |
Penalties
| De Arrascaeta (penalty scored); Jorginho (penalty missed); Lucas Paquetá (penalty missed); Léo Pereira (penalty scored); Bruno Henrique (penalty missed) | 2–3 | (penalty scored) Sosa; (penalty missed) Cetré; (penalty scored) Mancuso; (penalty scored) Ti. Palacios |

Estádio do Maracanã, Rio de Janeiro
Referee: Gustavo Tejera (Uruguay)

Tied 0–0 on aggregate, Estudiantes won on penalties and advanced to the final.

14 October 2026
21:30 UTC−3

| Fluminense (Brazil) | 1–2 | (Brazil) Palmeiras |
|---|---|---|
| Wesley Natã 90+3' | Report | López 45'; Marlon Freitas 85' |

Estádio do Maracanã, Rio de Janeiro
Referee: Facundo Tello (Argentina)
21 October 2026
21:30 UTC−3

| Palmeiras (Brazil) | 0–1 | (Brazil) Fluminense |
|---|---|---|
| | Report | Hércules 82' |
Penalties
| Maurício (penalty scored); Gómez (penalty scored); Sosa (penalty scored); Piquerez (penalty scored); Marlon Freitas (penalty scored) | 5–3 | (penalty scored) Thiago Silva; (penalty scored) Hércules; (penalty scored) Arana; (penalty missed) Nonato |

Nubank Parque, São Paulo
Referee: Esteban Ostojich (Uruguay)

Tied 2–2 on aggregate, Palmeiras won on penalties and advanced to the final.

== Final ==
The final will be played on 28 November 2026 at Estadio Centenario in Montevideo, Uruguay.

28 November 2026
--:-- UTC−3

| Palmeiras (Brazil) | v | (Argentina) Estudiantes |

Estadio Centenario, Montevideo
