= 2026 Copa Libertadores =

67th Copa Libertadores edition

Copa CONMEBOL Libertadores 2026
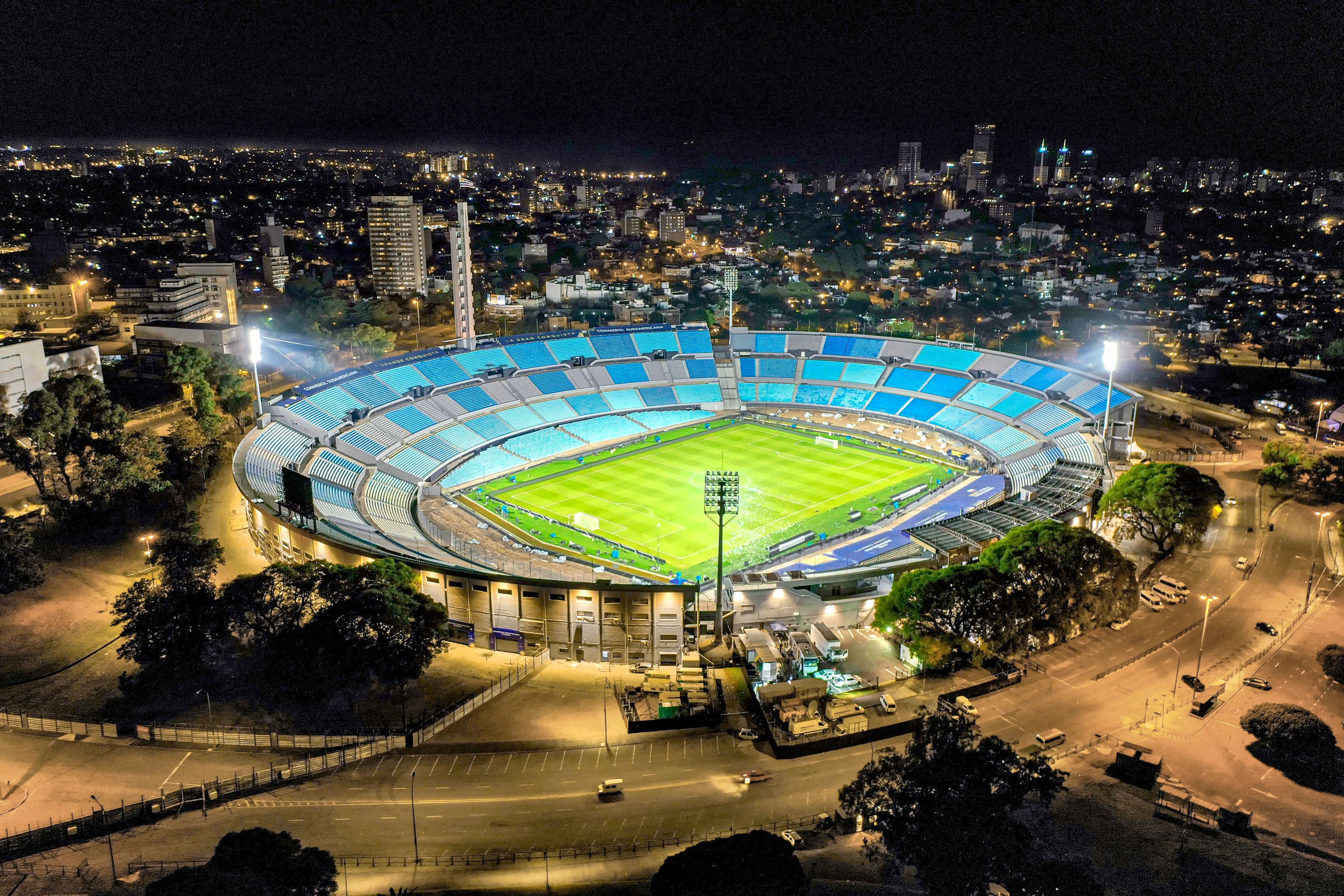
- The Estadio Centenario in Montevideo will host the final

Tournament details
- Dates: 3 February – 28 November 2026
- Teams: 47 (from 10 associations)

Tournament statistics
- Matches played: 154
- Goals scored: 322 (2.09 per match)
- Top scorer: (Paraguay) Álex Arce (9 goals)
- All statistics correct as of 22 October 2026.

The 2026 Copa CONMEBOL Libertadores is the 67th edition of the CONMEBOL Libertadores (also referred to as the Copa Libertadores), South America's premier club football tournament organized by CONMEBOL. The competition began on 3 February and is scheduled to end on 28 November 2026, with the final to be played at Estadio Centenario in Montevideo, Uruguay.

The winners of the 2026 Copa Libertadores will earn the right to play against the winners of the 2026 Copa Sudamericana in the 2027 Recopa Sudamericana. They will also automatically qualify for the 2026 FIFA Intercontinental Cup, the 2029 FIFA Club World Cup and the 2027 Copa Libertadores group stage.

Flamengo were the defending champions, but they were knocked out by Estudiantes in the semi-finals.

== Teams ==
The following 47 teams from the 10 CONMEBOL member associations qualified for the tournament:

- Copa Libertadores champions
- Copa Sudamericana champions
- Brazil: 7 berths
- Argentina: 6 berths
- All other associations: 4 berths each

The entry stage was determined as follows:

- Group stage: 28 teams
  - Copa Libertadores champions
  - Copa Sudamericana champions
  - Teams which qualified for berths 1–5 from Argentina and Brazil
  - Teams which qualified for berths 1–2 from all other associations
- Second stage: 13 teams
  - Teams which qualified for berths 6–7 from Brazil
  - Team which qualified for berth 6 from Argentina
  - Teams which qualified for berths 3–4 from Chile and Colombia
  - Teams which qualified for berth 3 from all other associations
- First stage: 6 teams
  - Teams which qualified for berth 4 from Bolivia, Ecuador, Paraguay, Peru, Uruguay and Venezuela

Association	Team (Berth)	Entry stage	Qualification method
Argentina (6 + 1 berths)	Lanús (Copa Sudamericana)	Group stage	2025 Copa Sudamericana champions
Argentina (6 + 1 berths)	Platense (Argentina 1)	Group stage	2025 Apertura champions
Argentina (6 + 1 berths)	Estudiantes (Argentina 2)	Group stage	2025 Clausura champions
Argentina (6 + 1 berths)	Independiente Rivadavia (Argentina 3)	Group stage	2025 Copa Argentina champions
Argentina (6 + 1 berths)	Rosario Central (Argentina 4)	Group stage	2025 Liga Profesional aggregate table best team not yet qualified
Argentina (6 + 1 berths)	Boca Juniors (Argentina 5)	Group stage	2025 Liga Profesional aggregate table 2nd best team not yet qualified
Argentina (6 + 1 berths)	Argentinos Juniors (Argentina 6)	Second stage	2025 Liga Profesional aggregate table 3rd best team not yet qualified
Bolivia (4 berths)	Always Ready (Bolivia 1)	Group stage	2025 División Profesional champions
Bolivia (4 berths)	Bolívar (Bolivia 2)	Group stage	2025 División Profesional runners-up
Bolivia (4 berths)	Nacional Potosí (Bolivia 3)	Second stage	2025 Copa Bolivia champions
Bolivia (4 berths)	The Strongest (Bolivia 4)	First stage	2025 División Profesional best team not yet qualified
Brazil (7 + 1 berths)	Flamengo (Title holders)	Group stage	2025 Copa Libertadores champions
Brazil (7 + 1 berths)	Corinthians (Brazil 1)	Group stage	2025 Copa do Brasil champions
Brazil (7 + 1 berths)	Palmeiras (Brazil 2)	Group stage	2025 Campeonato Brasileiro Série A runners-up
Brazil (7 + 1 berths)	Cruzeiro (Brazil 3)	Group stage	2025 Campeonato Brasileiro Série A 3rd place
Brazil (7 + 1 berths)	Mirassol (Brazil 4)	Group stage	2025 Campeonato Brasileiro Série A 4th place
Brazil (7 + 1 berths)	Fluminense (Brazil 5)	Group stage	2025 Campeonato Brasileiro Série A 5th place
Brazil (7 + 1 berths)	Botafogo (Brazil 6)	Second stage	2025 Campeonato Brasileiro Série A 6th place
Brazil (7 + 1 berths)	Bahia (Brazil 7)	Second stage	2025 Campeonato Brasileiro Série A 7th place
Chile (4 berths)	Coquimbo Unido (Chile 1)	Group stage	2025 Liga de Primera champions
Chile (4 berths)	Universidad Católica (Chile 2)	Group stage	2025 Liga de Primera runners-up
Chile (4 berths)	O'Higgins (Chile 3)	Second stage	2025 Liga de Primera 3rd place
Chile (4 berths)	Huachipato (Chile 4)	Second stage	2025 Copa Chile champions
Colombia (4 berths)	Santa Fe (Colombia 1)	Group stage	2025 Apertura champions
Colombia (4 berths)	Junior (Colombia 2)	Group stage	2025 Finalización champions
Colombia (4 berths)	Deportes Tolima (Colombia 3)	Second stage	2025 Primera A aggregate table best team not yet qualified
Colombia (4 berths)	Independiente Medellín (Colombia 4)	Second stage	2025 Primera A aggregate table 2nd best team not yet qualified
Ecuador (4 berths)	Independiente del Valle (Ecuador 1)	Group stage	2025 Serie A champions
Ecuador (4 berths)	LDU Quito (Ecuador 2)	Group stage	2025 Serie A runners-up
Ecuador (4 berths)	Barcelona (Ecuador 3)	Second stage	2025 Serie A best team not yet qualified
Ecuador (4 berths)	Universidad Católica (Ecuador 4)	First stage	2025 Copa Ecuador champions
Paraguay (4 berths)	Cerro Porteño (Paraguay 1)	Group stage	2025 Copa de Primera (Apertura or Clausura) champions with better record in aggregate table
Paraguay (4 berths)	Libertad (Paraguay 2)	Group stage	2025 Copa de Primera tournament (Apertura or Clausura) champions with worse record in aggregate table
Paraguay (4 berths)	Guaraní (Paraguay 3)	Second stage	2025 Copa de Primera aggregate table best team not yet qualified
Paraguay (4 berths)	2 de Mayo (Paraguay 4)	First stage	2025 Copa Paraguay runners-up
Peru (4 berths)	Universitario (Peru 1)	Group stage	2025 Liga 1 champions
Peru (4 berths)	Cusco (Peru 2)	Group stage	2025 Liga 1 runners-up
Peru (4 berths)	Sporting Cristal (Peru 3)	Second stage	2025 Liga 1 3rd place
Peru (4 berths)	Alianza Lima (Peru 4)	First stage	2025 Liga 1 4th place
Uruguay (4 berths)	Nacional (Uruguay 1)	Group stage	2025 Liga AUF Uruguaya champions
Uruguay (4 berths)	Peñarol (Uruguay 2)	Group stage	2025 Liga AUF Uruguaya runners-up
Uruguay (4 berths)	Liverpool (Uruguay 3)	Second stage	2025 Liga AUF Uruguaya aggregate table best team not yet qualified
Uruguay (4 berths)	Juventud (Uruguay 4)	First stage	2025 Liga AUF Uruguaya aggregate table 2nd best team not yet qualified
Venezuela (4 berths)	Universidad Central (Venezuela 1)	Group stage	2025 Liga FUTVE champions
Venezuela (4 berths)	Deportivo La Guaira (Venezuela 2)	Group stage	2025 Liga FUTVE aggregate table 1st place
Venezuela (4 berths)	Carabobo (Venezuela 3)	Second stage	2025 Liga FUTVE runners-up
Venezuela (4 berths)	Deportivo Táchira (Venezuela 4)	First stage	2025 Liga FUTVE aggregate table best team not yet qualified

Notes

1. Paraguay (PAR): Since the 2025 Copa Paraguay champions General Caballero (JLM) were relegated and therefore became ineligible to qualify for South American competitions, the Paraguay 4 berth was awarded to the Copa Paraguay runners-up, 2 de Mayo.

== Schedule ==
The schedule of the competition is as follows:

Schedule for 2026 Copa Libertadores
Stage	Draw date	First leg	Second leg
First stage	18 December 2025	3–5 February 2026	10–12 February 2026
Second stage	18 December 2025	17–19 February 2026	24–26 February 2026
Third stage	18 December 2025	3–5 March 2026	10–12 March 2026
Group stage	19 March 2026	Matchday 1: 7–9 April 2026; Matchday 2: 14–16 April 2026; Matchday 3: 28–30 April 2026; Matchday 4: 5–7 May 2026; Matchday 5: 19–21 May 2026; Matchday 6: 26–28 May 2026	
Round of 16	29 May 2026	11–13 August 2026	18–20 August 2026
Quarter-finals	29 May 2026	8–10 September 2026	15–17 September 2026
Semi-finals	29 May 2026	14–15 October 2026	21–22 October 2026
Final	29 May 2026	28 November 2026 at Estadio Centenario, Montevideo	

== Draws ==
Location of teams of the 2026 Copa Libertadores.
Brown: Group A; Red: Group B; Orange: Group C;
Yellow: Group D; Green: Group E; Blue: Group F;
Purple: Group G; Pink: Group H; White: Play-off rounds.

The draw for the qualifying stages was held on 18 December 2025, 12:00 PYT (UTC−3), at the CONMEBOL Convention Centre in Luque, Paraguay.

Teams were seeded by their CONMEBOL Clubs ranking as of 15 December 2025 (shown in parentheses), taking into account the following three factors:

1. Performance in the last 10 years, taking into account Copa Libertadores and Copa Sudamericana results in the period 2016–2025.
2. Historical coefficient, taking into account Copa Libertadores and Copa Sudamericana results in the period 1960–2015 and 2002–2015 respectively.
3. Local tournament champion, with bonus points awarded to domestic league champions of the last 10 years.

For the first stage, the six teams were drawn into three ties (E1–E3), with the teams from Pot 1 hosting the second leg.

First stage draw
Pot 1	Pot 2
(Peru) Alianza Lima (40); (Venezuela) Deportivo Táchira (50); (Ecuador) Universidad Católica (60)	(Paraguay) 2 de Mayo (247); (Uruguay) Juventud (287); (Bolivia) The Strongest (41)

1. ^{†} The identity of the team from Bolivia was not known at the time of the draw and it was seeded in Pot 2.

For the second stage, the 16 teams were drawn into eight ties (C1–C8), with the teams from Pot 1 hosting the second leg. Teams from the same association could not be drawn into the same tie, excluding the three winners of the first stage, which were seeded in Pot 2 and whose identity was not known at the time of the draw, and could be drawn into the same tie with another team from the same association.

Second stage draw
Pot 1	Pot 2
(Brazil) Botafogo (19); (Peru) Sporting Cristal (38); (Paraguay) Guaraní (44); (Colombia) Independiente Medellín (45); (Argentina) Argentinos Juniors (47); (Colombia) Deportes Tolima (57); (Brazil) Bahia (63); (Chile) Huachipato (71)	(Uruguay) Liverpool (85); (Venezuela) Carabobo (128); (Chile) O'Higgins (166); (Bolivia) Nacional Potosí (92); (Ecuador) Barcelona (28); First stage winner E1; First stage winner E2; First stage winner E3

1. ^{†} The identity of the teams from Bolivia and Ecuador was not known at the time of the draw and they were seeded in Pot 2.

For the third stage, the eight winners of the second stage were allocated without any draw into the following four ties (G1–G4), with the team in each tie with the higher CONMEBOL ranking hosting the second leg.

- Second stage winner C1 vs. Second stage winner C8
- Second stage winner C2 vs. Second stage winner C7
- Second stage winner C3 vs. Second stage winner C6
- Second stage winner C4 vs. Second stage winner C5

The draw for the group stage was held on 19 March 2026, 20:00 PYT (UTC−3), at the CONMEBOL Convention Centre in Luque, Paraguay. For the group stage, the 32 teams were drawn into eight groups (Groups A–H) of four containing a team from each of the four pots. Teams from the same association could not be drawn into the same group, excluding the four winners of the third stage, which were allocated to Pot 4 and could be drawn into the same group with another team from the same association.

Group stage draw
Pot 1	Pot 2	Pot 3	Pot 4
(Brazil) Flamengo (2); (Brazil) Palmeiras (1); (Argentina) Boca Juniors (4); (Uruguay) Peñarol (5); (Uruguay) Nacional (8); (Ecuador) LDU Quito (10); (Brazil) Fluminense (11); (Ecuador) Independiente del Valle (16)	(Argentina) Lanús (21); (Paraguay) Libertad (17); (Argentina) Estudiantes (18); (Paraguay) Cerro Porteño (20); (Brazil) Corinthians (22); (Bolivia) Bolívar (23); (Brazil) Cruzeiro (29); (Peru) Universitario (32)	(Colombia) Junior (34); (Chile) Universidad Católica (35); (Argentina) Rosario Central (48); (Colombia) Santa Fe (53); (Bolivia) Always Ready (64); (Chile) Coquimbo Unido (82); (Venezuela) Deportivo La Guaira (114); (Peru) Cusco (142)	(Venezuela) Universidad Central (179); (Argentina) Platense (223); (Argentina) Independiente Rivadavia (No rank); (Brazil) Mirassol (No rank); (Colombia) Independiente Medellín (45); (Colombia) Deportes Tolima (57); (Peru) Sporting Cristal (38); (Ecuador) Barcelona (28)

Notes

1. ^{TH} The defending Copa Libertadores champions were automatically allocated to Group A and the position A1.
2. ^{CS} The defending Copa Sudamericana champions were seeded in Pot 2.
3. ^{Q3} The third stage winners were seeded in Pot 4.

The draw for the round of 16 was held on 29 May 2026, 12:00 PYT (UTC−3) at the CONMEBOL headquarters in Luque, Paraguay. For the round of 16, the 16 teams were drawn into eight ties (A–H) between a group winner (Pot 1) and a group runner-up (Pot 2), with the group winners hosting the second leg. Teams from the same association or the same group could be drawn into the same tie (Regulations Article 2.2.3.2).

== Qualifying stages ==
In the qualifying stages, each tie was played on a home-and-away two-legged basis. If tied on aggregate, extra time would not be played, and a penalty shoot-out was used to determine the winner (Regulations Article 2.4.3). The qualifying stages were structured as follows:

- First stage (6 teams): The three winners of the first stage advanced to the second stage to join the 13 teams which were given byes to the second stage.
- Second stage (16 teams): The eight winners of the second stage advanced to the third stage.
- Third stage (8 teams): The four winners of the third stage advanced to the group stage to join the 28 direct entrants. The four teams eliminated in the third stage entered the Copa Sudamericana group stage.

=== First stage ===
Team 1	Agg.	Team 2	1st leg	2nd leg
The Strongest (Bolivia)	2–2 (3–5 p)	(Venezuela) Deportivo Táchira	2–1	0–1
Juventud (Uruguay)	4–4 (4–3 p)	(Ecuador) Universidad Católica	0–1	4–3
2 de Mayo (Paraguay)	2–1	(Peru) Alianza Lima	1–0	1–1

=== Second stage ===
Team 1	Agg.	Team 2	1st leg	2nd leg
Juventud (Uruguay)	2–1	(Paraguay) Guaraní	0–0	2–1
Deportivo Táchira (Venezuela)	1–1 (0–3 p)	(Colombia) Deportes Tolima	0–1	1–0
2 de Mayo (Paraguay)	2–2 (4–5 p)	(Peru) Sporting Cristal	2–2	0–0
Barcelona (Ecuador)	1–1 (5–4 p)	(Argentina) Argentinos Juniors	0–1	1–0
Nacional Potosí (Bolivia)	1–2	(Brazil) Botafogo	1–0	0–2
Carabobo (Venezuela)	3–1	(Chile) Huachipato	1–0	2–1
O'Higgins (Chile)	2–2 (4–3 p)	(Brazil) Bahia	1–0	1–2
Liverpool (Uruguay)	1–2	(Colombia) Independiente Medellín	1–2	0–0

=== Third stage ===
Team 1	Agg.	Team 2	1st leg	2nd leg
Juventud (Uruguay)	2–3	(Colombia) Independiente Medellín	1–1	1–2
O'Higgins (Chile)	1–2	(Colombia) Deportes Tolima	1–0	0–2
Carabobo (Venezuela)	2–2 (2–3 p)	(Peru) Sporting Cristal	0–1	2–1
Barcelona (Ecuador)	2–1	(Brazil) Botafogo	1–1	1–0

== Group stage ==
In the group stage, each group was played on a home-and-away round-robin basis. The winners and runners-up of each group advanced to the round of 16 of the final stages. The third-placed teams of each group entered the knockout round play-offs of the 2026 Copa Sudamericana.

=== Group A ===
Pos	Team	Pld	W	D	L	GF	GA	GD	Pts	Qualification	FLA	EST	DIM	CUS
1	(Brazil) Flamengo	6	5	1	0	14	2	+12	16	Round of 16	—	1–0	4–1	3–0
2	(Argentina) Estudiantes	6	2	3	1	6	5	+1	9	Round of 16	1–1	—	1–0	2–1
3	(Colombia) Independiente Medellín	6	2	1	3	6	11	−5	7	Copa Sudamericana	0–3 (Note: The Independiente Medellín v Flamengo match was suspended at 0–0 in the 5th minute of play due to disturbances by Independiente Medellín fans. The match was abandoned after a one-hour wait, with CONMEBOL confirming its cancellation and referring the matter to its Disciplinary Commission, which subsequently awarded Flamengo a 3–0 win.)	1–1	—	1–0
4	(Peru) Cusco	6	0	1	5	4	12	−8	1		0–2	1–1	2–3	—

Source: CONMEBOL

=== Group B ===
Pos	Team	Pld	W	D	L	GF	GA	GD	Pts	Qualification	COQ	TOL	NAC	UNI
1	(Chile) Coquimbo Unido	6	3	1	2	8	6	+2	10	Round of 16	—	3–0	1–1	2–1
2	(Colombia) Deportes Tolima	6	2	2	2	7	6	+1	8 (Note: Head-to-head goal difference: Deportes Tolima +1, Nacional −1.)	Round of 16	3–0	—	3–0	0–0
3	(Uruguay) Nacional	6	2	2	2	7	9	−2	8	Copa Sudamericana	1–0	3–1	—	0–0
4	(Peru) Universitario	6	1	3	2	5	6	−1	6		0–2	0–0	4–2	—

Source: CONMEBOL

=== Group C ===
Pos	Team	Pld	W	D	L	GF	GA	GD	Pts	Qualification	IRI	FLU	BOL	DLG
1	(Argentina) Independiente Rivadavia	6	5	1	0	15	6	+9	16	Round of 16	—	1–1	1–0	4–1
2	(Brazil) Fluminense	6	2	2	2	7	7	0	8	Round of 16	1–2	—	2–1	3–1
3	(Bolivia) Bolívar	6	1	2	3	6	8	−2	5	Copa Sudamericana	1–3	2–0	—	1–1
4	(Venezuela) Deportivo La Guaira	6	0	3	3	6	13	−7	3		2–4	0–0	1–1	—

Source: CONMEBOL

=== Group D ===
Pos	Team	Pld	W	D	L	GF	GA	GD	Pts	Qualification	UCA	CRU	BOC	BSC
1	(Chile) Universidad Católica	6	4	1	1	8	4	+4	13	Round of 16	—	0–0	1–2	2–0
2	(Brazil) Cruzeiro	6	3	2	1	8	3	+5	11	Round of 16	1–2	—	1–0	4–0
3	(Argentina) Boca Juniors	6	2	1	3	6	5	+1	7	Copa Sudamericana	0–1	1–1	—	3–0
4	(Ecuador) Barcelona	6	1	0	5	2	12	−10	3		1–2	0–1	1–0	—

Source: CONMEBOL

=== Group E ===
Pos	Team	Pld	W	D	L	GF	GA	GD	Pts	Qualification	COR	PLA	SFE	PEÑ
1	(Brazil) Corinthians	6	3	2	1	8	4	+4	11	Round of 16	—	0–2	2–0	2–0
2	(Argentina) Platense	6	3	1	2	8	7	+1	10	Round of 16	0–2	—	2–1	1–1
3	(Colombia) Santa Fe	6	2	2	2	6	7	−1	8	Copa Sudamericana	1–1	2–1	—	1–1
4	(Uruguay) Peñarol	6	0	3	3	4	8	−4	3		1–1	1–2	0–1	—

Source: CONMEBOL

=== Group F ===
Pos	Team	Pld	W	D	L	GF	GA	GD	Pts	Qualification	CCP	PAL	CRI	JUN
1	(Paraguay) Cerro Porteño	6	4	1	1	6	2	+4	13	Round of 16	—	1–1	2–0	1–0
2	(Brazil) Palmeiras	6	3	2	1	10	5	+5	11	Round of 16	0–1	—	2–1	4–1
3	(Peru) Sporting Cristal	6	2	0	4	6	9	−3	6	Copa Sudamericana	1–0	0–2	—	2–0
4	(Colombia) Junior	6	1	1	4	5	11	−6	4		0–1	1–1	3–2	—

Source: CONMEBOL

=== Group G ===
Pos	Team	Pld	W	D	L	GF	GA	GD	Pts	Qualification	LDQ	MIR	LAN	CAR
1	(Ecuador) LDU Quito	6	4	0	2	8	5	+3	12	Round of 16	—	2–0	2–0	3–2
2	(Brazil) Mirassol	6	4	0	2	7	4	+3	12	Round of 16	2–0	—	1–0	2–0
3	(Argentina) Lanús	6	3	0	3	3	7	−4	9	Copa Sudamericana	1–0	1–0	—	1–0
4	(Bolivia) Always Ready	6	1	0	5	7	9	−2	3		0–1	1–2	4–0	—

Source: CONMEBOL

=== Group H ===
Pos	Team	Pld	W	D	L	GF	GA	GD	Pts	Qualification	IDV	ROS	UCV	LIB
1	(Ecuador) Independiente del Valle	6	4	1	1	11	6	+5	13 (Note: Head-to-head points: Independiente del Valle 4, Rosario Central 1.)	Round of 16	—	1–0	3–1	4–1
2	(Argentina) Rosario Central	6	4	1	1	9	1	+8	13	Round of 16	0–0	—	4–0	1–0
3	(Venezuela) Universidad Central	6	3	0	3	7	11	−4	9	Copa Sudamericana	2–0	0–3	—	3–1
4	(Paraguay) Libertad	6	0	0	6	4	13	−9	0		2–3	0–1	0–1	—

Source: CONMEBOL

== Final stages ==
Starting from the round of 16, the teams play a single-elimination tournament with the following rules:

- In the round of 16, quarter-finals and semi-finals, each tie is played on a home-and-away two-legged basis, with the higher-seeded team hosting the second leg (Regulations Article 2.2.3.2). If tied on aggregate, extra time will not be played, and a penalty shoot-out will be used to determine the winners (Regulations Article 2.4.3).
- The final is played as a single match at a venue pre-selected by CONMEBOL, with the higher-seeded team designated as the "home" team for administrative purposes (Regulations Article 2.2.3.5). If tied after regulation, 30 minutes of extra time will be played. If still tied after extra time, a penalty shoot-out will be used to determine the winners (Regulations Article 2.4.4).

=== Qualified teams ===
Group	Winners	Runners-up
A	(Brazil) Flamengo	(Argentina) Estudiantes
B	(Chile) Coquimbo Unido	(Colombia) Deportes Tolima
C	(Argentina) Independiente Rivadavia	(Brazil) Fluminense
D	(Chile) Universidad Católica	(Brazil) Cruzeiro
E	(Brazil) Corinthians	(Argentina) Platense
F	(Paraguay) Cerro Porteño	(Brazil) Palmeiras
G	(Ecuador) LDU Quito	(Brazil) Mirassol
H	(Ecuador) Independiente del Valle	(Argentina) Rosario Central

=== Seeding ===
Starting from the round of 16, the teams were seeded according to their results in the group stage, with the group winners (Pot 1) seeded 1–8, and the group runners-up (Pot 2) seeded 9–16.

Seed	Grp	Team	Pld	W	D	L	GF	GA	GD	Pts	Round of 16 draw
1	A	(Brazil) Flamengo	6	5	1	0	14	2	+12	16	Pot 1
2	C	(Argentina) Independiente Rivadavia	6	5	1	0	15	6	+9	16	Pot 1
3	H	(Ecuador) Independiente del Valle	6	4	1	1	11	6	+5	13	Pot 1
4	D	(Chile) Universidad Católica	6	4	1	1	8	4	+4	13	Pot 1
5	F	(Paraguay) Cerro Porteño	6	4	1	1	6	2	+4	13	Pot 1
6	G	(Ecuador) LDU Quito	6	4	0	2	8	5	+3	12	Pot 1
7	E	(Brazil) Corinthians	6	3	2	1	8	4	+4	11	Pot 1
8	B	(Chile) Coquimbo Unido	6	3	1	2	8	6	+2	10	Pot 1
9	H	(Argentina) Rosario Central	6	4	1	1	9	1	+8	13	Pot 2
10	G	(Brazil) Mirassol	6	4	0	2	7	4	+3	12	Pot 2
11	F	(Brazil) Palmeiras	6	3	2	1	10	5	+5	11	Pot 2
12	D	(Brazil) Cruzeiro	6	3	2	1	8	3	+5	11	Pot 2
13	E	(Argentina) Platense	6	3	1	2	8	7	+1	10	Pot 2
14	A	(Argentina) Estudiantes	6	2	3	1	6	5	+1	9	Pot 2
15	B	(Colombia) Deportes Tolima	6	2	2	2	7	6	+1	8	Pot 2
16	C	(Brazil) Fluminense	6	2	2	2	7	7	0	8	Pot 2

Source: CONMEBOL
Rules for classification: 1) Higher position in group; 2) Points; 3) Goal difference; 4) Goals scored; 5) Fewest number of red cards; 6) Fewest number of yellow cards; 7) Drawing of lots (Regulations Article 2.4.2).

=== Bracket ===
The bracket was decided based on the round of 16 draw, which was held on 29 May 2026.

Round of 16
16	(Brazil) Fluminense (p)	0	1	1 (5)
2	(Argentina) Independiente Rivadavia	0	1	1 (4)
13	(Argentina) Platense (p)	1	0	1 (7)
8	(Chile) Coquimbo Unido	1	0	1 (6)
11	(Brazil) Palmeiras	1	1	2
5	(Paraguay) Cerro Porteño	1	0	1
10	(Brazil) Mirassol	1	0	1 (4)
6	(Ecuador) LDU Quito (p)	1	0	1 (5)
14	(Argentina) Estudiantes	1	3	4
4	(Chile) Universidad Católica	1	0	1
9	(Argentina) Rosario Central	0	0	0
7	(Brazil) Corinthians	0	1	1
15	(Colombia) Deportes Tolima	0	1	1
3	(Ecuador) Independiente del Valle	1	3	4
12	(Brazil) Cruzeiro	1	1	2
1	(Brazil) Flamengo	1	2	3

Quarter-finals
16	(Brazil) Fluminense	2	1	3
13	(Argentina) Platense	0	2	2
11	(Brazil) Palmeiras (p)	1	2	3 (4)
6	(Ecuador) LDU Quito	0	3	3 (3)
14	(Argentina) Estudiantes	1	1	2
7	(Brazil) Corinthians	1	0	1
3	(Ecuador) Independiente del Valle	0	1	1
1	(Brazil) Flamengo	2	1	3

Semi-finals
16	(Brazil) Fluminense	1	1	2 (3)
11	(Brazil) Palmeiras (p)	2	0	2 (5)
14	(Argentina) Estudiantes (p)	0	0	0 (3)
1	(Brazil) Flamengo	0	0	0 (2)

Final
28 November – Montevideo
11	(Brazil) Palmeiras
14	(Argentina) Estudiantes

=== Round of 16 ===
Team 1	Agg.	Team 2	1st leg	2nd leg
Estudiantes (Argentina)	4–1	(Chile) Universidad Católica	1–1	3–0
Mirassol (Brazil)	1–1 (4–5 p)	(Ecuador) LDU Quito	1–1	0–0
Fluminense (Brazil)	1–1 (5–4 p)	(Argentina) Independiente Rivadavia	0–0	1–1
Deportes Tolima (Colombia)	1–4	(Ecuador) Independiente del Valle	0–1	1–3
Cruzeiro (Brazil)	2–3	(Brazil) Flamengo	1–1	1–2
Platense (Argentina)	1–1 (7–6 p)	(Chile) Coquimbo Unido	1–1	0–0
Palmeiras (Brazil)	2–1	(Paraguay) Cerro Porteño	1–1	1–0
Rosario Central (Argentina)	0–1	(Brazil) Corinthians	0–0	0–1

=== Quarter-finals ===
Team 1	Agg.	Team 2	1st leg	2nd leg
Estudiantes (Argentina)	2–1	(Brazil) Corinthians	1–1	1–0
Palmeiras (Brazil)	3–3 (4–3 p)	(Ecuador) LDU Quito	1–0	2–3
Fluminense (Brazil)	3–2	(Argentina) Platense	2–0	1–2
Independiente del Valle (Ecuador)	1–3	(Brazil) Flamengo	0–2	1–1

=== Semi-finals ===
Team 1	Agg.	Team 2	1st leg	2nd leg
Estudiantes (Argentina)	0–0 (3–2 p)	(Brazil) Flamengo	0–0	0–0
Fluminense (Brazil)	2–2 (3–5 p)	(Brazil) Palmeiras	1–2	1–0

=== Final ===
The final will be played on 28 November 2026 at Estadio Centenario in Montevideo, Uruguay.

28 November 2026
--:-- UTC−3

Palmeiras (Brazil)	v	(Argentina) Estudiantes

Estadio Centenario, Montevideo

== Statistics ==
As of 22 October 2026

=== Top scorers ===
Rank	Player	Team	1Q1	1Q2	2Q1	2Q2	3Q1	3Q2	GS1	GS2	GS3	GS4	GS5	GS6	⅛F1	⅛F2	QF1	QF2	SF1	SF2	F	Total
1	(Paraguay) Álex Arce	(Argentina) Independiente Rivadavia								1	3	1	3			1						9
2	(Paraguay) Carlos González	(Ecuador) Independiente del Valle								2	3		1			1						7
3	(Brazil) Bruno Henrique	(Brazil) Flamengo							1	1				2			1					5
4	(Paraguay) Lorenzo Melgarejo	(Paraguay) Libertad							1		2		1									4
4	(Brazil) Matheus Pereira	(Brazil) Cruzeiro							1	1				2								4
4	(Chile) Fernando Zampedri	(Chile) Universidad Católica									1		2		1							4
4	(Uruguay) Giorgian de Arrascaeta	(Brazil) Flamengo							1	1						1		1				4
4	(Argentina) Francisco Fydriszewski	(Colombia) Independiente Medellín			1			1			1		1									4
4	(Argentina) José Manuel López	(Brazil) Palmeiras								1		1			1				1			4

Source: CONMEBOL Libertadores

== See also ==
- 2026 Copa Sudamericana
