= Manuel Fernández (Uruguayan footballer) =

Uruguayan–Chilean footballer (born 1989)

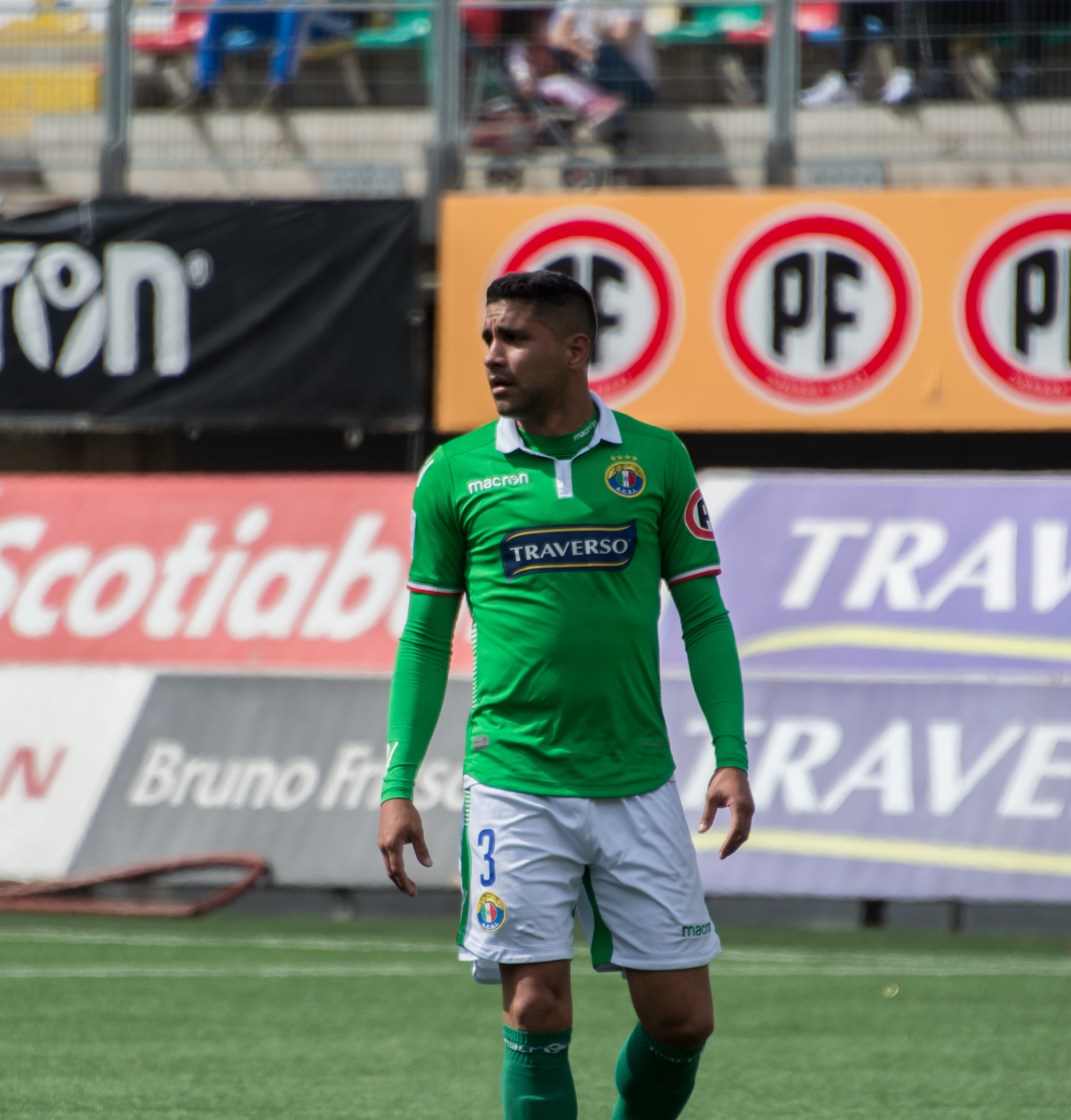
- Fernández with Audax Italiano in 2018

Personal information
- Full name: Manuel Elías Fernández Guzmán
- Date of birth: 25 January 1989 (age 37)
- Place of birth: Montevideo, Uruguay
- Height: 1.81 m (5 ft 11 in)
- Position: Defender

Team information
- Current team: Coquimbo Unido
- Number: 3

Youth career
- El Puente FC
- Racing Montevideo

Senior career*
| Years | Team | Apps | (Gls) |
| 2011–2014 | Racing Montevideo | 73 | (4) |
| 2014–2016 | Deportes Concepción | 54 | (3) |
| 2016–2017 | Coquimbo Unido | 26 | (3) |
| 2017–2021 | Audax Italiano | 93 | (3) |
| 2022–2023 | Unión Española | 40 | (3) |
| 2024– | Coquimbo Unido | 18 | (0) |
- * Club domestic league appearances and goals as of 25 January 2024

Manuel Elías Fernández Guzmán (born 25 January 1989) is an Uruguayan naturalized Chilean footballer that currently plays for Primera División de Chile side Coquimbo Unido.

== Career ==
As a youth player, Fernández was with club El Puente FC.

In 2024, Fernández returned to Coquimbo Unido in the Chilean Primera División after his stint in 2016–17 and won the 2025 league title, the first one for the club.

== Personal life ==
Fernández naturalized Chilean by residence in 2023.

== Honours ==
Coquimbo Unido

- Chilean Primera División: 2025
- Supercopa de Chile: 2026
- Copa de La Liga: 2026
