= Federico Barrandeguy =

Uruguayan footballer (born 1996)

Personal information
- Full name: Federico Barrandeguy Martino
- Date of birth: 8 May 1996 (age 30)
- Place of birth: Ombúes de Lavalle, Uruguay
- Height: 1.76 m (5 ft 9 in)
- Position: Right-back

Team information
- Current team: CA Juventud
- Number: 24

Senior career*
Years	Team	Apps	(Gls)
2015–2019	Montevideo Wanderers	73	(3)
2020–2021	Botafogo	21	(0)
2022–2023	Plaza Colonia	31	(4)
2023–2024	Rampla Juniors	35	(1)
2025–	CA Juventud	30	(0)
- * Club domestic league appearances and goals as of 1 October 2025

Federico Barrandeguy Martino (born 8 May 1996) is a Uruguayan footballer who plays as a defender for CA Juventud.
