= Luis Sandoval (footballer) =

Colombian footballer (born 1999)

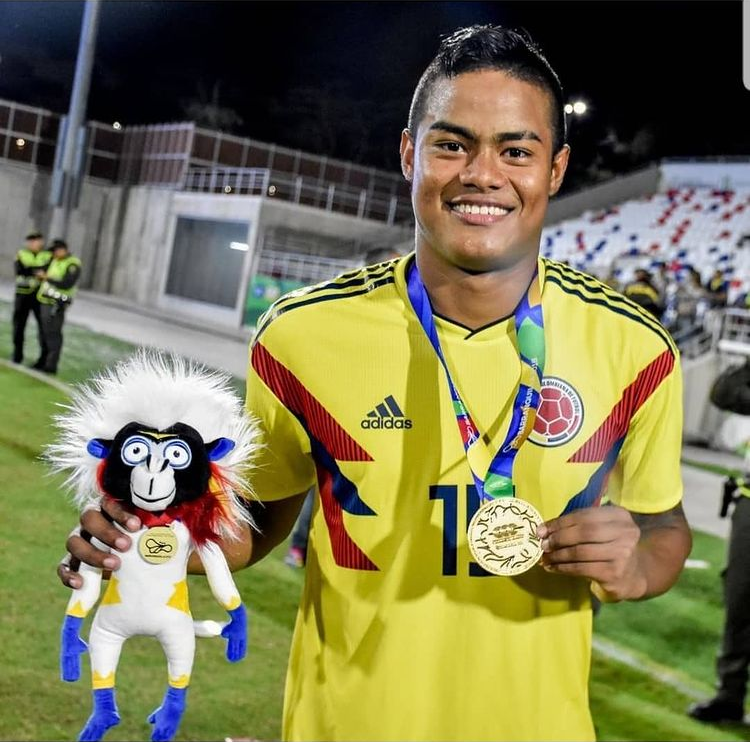

Personal information
- Full name: Luis Fernando Sandoval Oyola
- Date of birth: 1 June 1999 (age 27)
- Place of birth: Soledad, Atlántico, Colombia
- Height: 1.83 m (6 ft 0 in)
- Position: Forward

Team information
- Current team: Deportes Tolima (on loan from Independiente Medellín)
- Number: 9

Senior career*
| Years | Team | Apps | (Gls) |
| 2017–2023 | Atlético Junior | 32 | (6) |
| 2017 | → Barranquilla (loan) | 27 | (3) |
| 2018–2019 | → Barranquilla (loan) | 13 | (8) |
| 2023–2024 | Deportivo Cali | 27 | (12) |
| 2024 | Real Cartagena | 9 | (1) |
| 2024– | Independiente Medellín | 57 | (8) |
| 2026– | → Deportes Tolima (loan) | 12 | (6) |

International career^{‡}
| 2018-2019 | Colombia U20 | 10 | (2) |
| 2020 | Colombia U23 | 5 | (0) |
- * Club domestic league appearances and goals as of 11 December 2025 ‡ National team caps and goals as of 16 May 2019

Luis Fernando Sandoval Oyola (born 1 June 1999) is a Colombian footballer who currently plays as a forward for Deportes Tolima, on loan from Independiente Medellín. He played in the 2019 FIFA U-20 World Cup with Colombia U20.

== Career statistics ==
=== Club ===
As of 1 June 2025.

| Club | Division | League | | | Cup | | Continental | | Total | |
| Club | Division | Season | Apps | Goals | Apps | Goals | Apps | Goals | Apps | Goals |
|---|---|---|---|---|---|---|---|---|---|---|
| Barranquilla | Categoría Primera B | 2017 | 27 | 3 | 5 | 0 | — | | 32 | 3 |
| Barranquilla | Categoría Primera B | 2018 | 6 | 5 | — | | — | | 6 | 5 |
| Barranquilla | Categoría Primera B | 2019 | 7 | 3 | — | | — | | 7 | 3 |
| Barranquilla | Categoría Primera B | 2022 | 19 | 5 | — | | — | | 19 | 5 |
| Barranquilla | Total | | 59 | 16 | 5 | 0 | 0 | 0 | 64 | 16 |
| Atlético Junior | Categoría Primera A | 2018 | 2 | 0 | — | | — | | 2 | 0 |
| Atlético Junior | Categoría Primera A | 2019 | 12 | 3 | 1 | 0 | — | | 13 | 3 |
| Atlético Junior | Categoría Primera A | 2020 | 2 | 0 | 1 | 0 | 1 | 0 | 4 | 0 |
| Atlético Junior | Categoría Primera A | 2021 | 4 | 0 | — | | — | | 4 | 0 |
| Atlético Junior | Categoría Primera A | 2023 | 12 | 3 | — | | 1 | 0 | 13 | 3 |
| Atlético Junior | Total | | 32 | 6 | 2 | 0 | 2 | 0 | 36 | 6 |
| Fortaleza | Categoría Primera B | 2021 | 17 | 7 | — | | — | | 17 | 7 |
| Águilas Doradas | Categoría Primera A | 2022 | 7 | 0 | 2 | 0 | — | | 9 | 0 |
| Deportivo Cali | Categoría Primera A | 2023 | 21 | 9 | 2 | 1 | — | | 23 | 10 |
| Deportivo Cali | Categoría Primera A | 2024 | 6 | 3 | — | | — | | 6 | 3 |
| Deportivo Cali | Total | | 27 | 12 | 2 | 1 | 0 | 0 | 29 | 13 |
| Real Cartagena | Categoría Primera B | 2024 | 9 | 1 | 2 | 0 | — | | 11 | 1 |
| Independiente Medellín | Categoría Primera A | 2024 | 15 | 2 | 6 | 2 | 4 | 0 | 25 | 4 |
| Independiente Medellín | Categoría Primera A | 2025 | 19 | 3 | — | | — | | 19 | 3 |
| Independiente Medellín | Total | | 34 | 5 | 6 | 2 | 4 | 0 | 44 | 7 |
| Career total | | | 185 | 47 | 19 | 3 | 6 | 0 | 210 | 50 |

== Honours ==
=== Colombia U20 ===
- Central American and Caribbean Games: 2018
