= Santiago González (footballer, born 1999) =

Argentine footballer (born 1999)

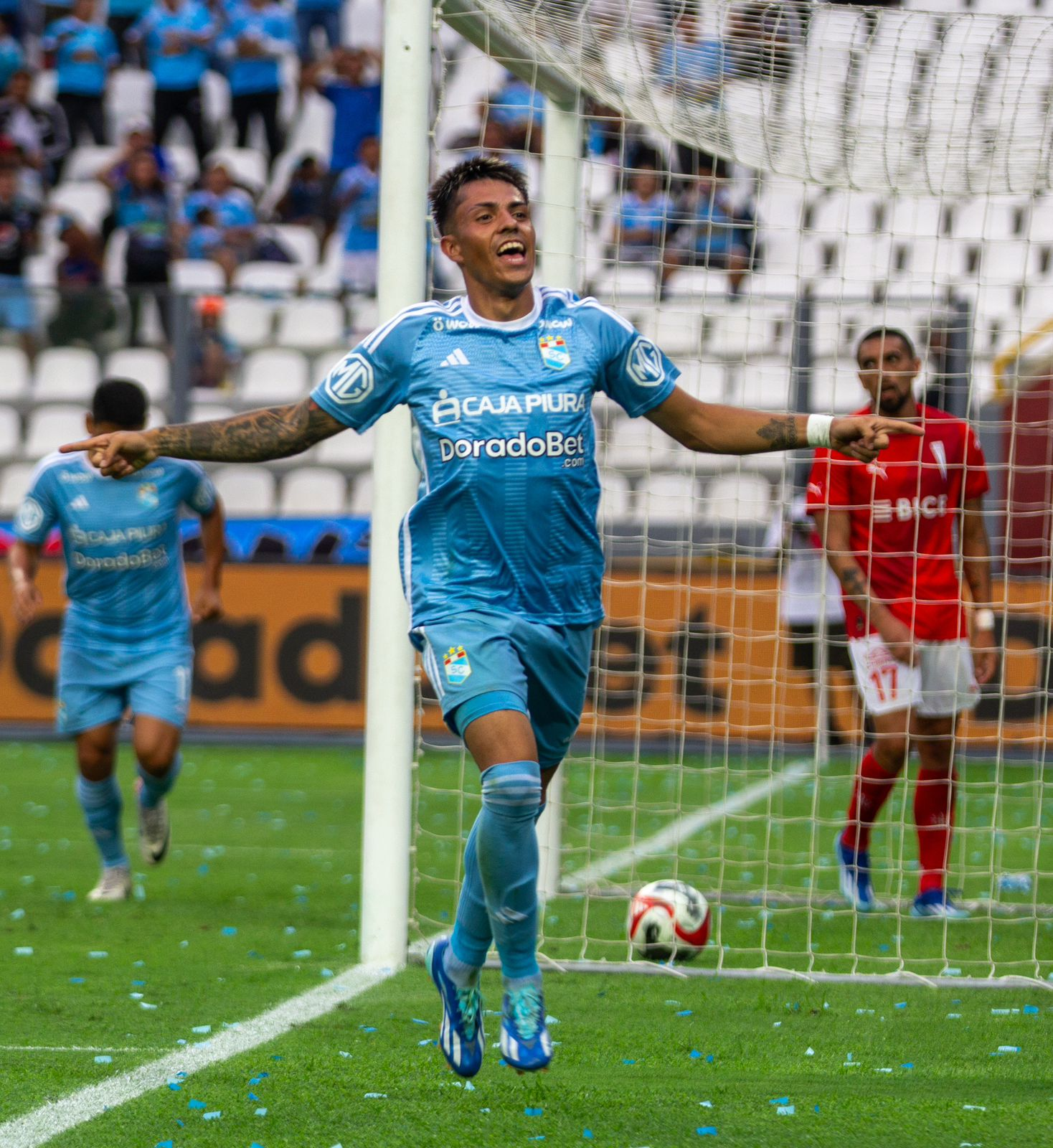

Personal information
- Full name: Santiago Emanuel González Puga
- Date of birth: 25 July 1999 (age 27)
- Place of birth: San Martín, Mendoza, Argentina
- Height: 1.69 m (5 ft 7 in)
- Position: Winger

Team information
- Current team: Sporting Cristal
- Number: 7

Senior career*
Years	Team	Apps	(Gls)
2016–2017	Deportivo Guaymallén		
2016–2017	→ Rodeo del Medio (loan)		
2017–2018	Deportivo Maipú	24	(8)
2018–2019	San Lorenzo	0	(0)
2019	→ Nueva Chicago (loan)	11	(0)
2020–2021	Gimnasia Mendoza	23	(2)
2021–2023	Deportivo Maipú	91	(12)
2024–	Sporting Cristal	29	(12)
- * Club domestic league appearances and goals as of 15:02, 25 September 2024 (UTC)

Santiago Emanuel González Puga (born 25 July 1999) is an Argentine footballer who plays as a winger for Peruvian club Sporting Cristal.

== Career ==
Born in San Martín in Mendoza Province, González began playing for Deportivo Guaymallén in the Torneo Federal C, in the fifth tier of the Argentine football league system, moving on loan to Deportivo Rodeo del Medio (Torneo Federal B), and then on to Deportivo Maipú (Torneo Federal A). He helped the last of those clubs into the last 32 of the Copa Argentina prior to his departure in 2018, scoring a goal and assisting another in a 3–0 win over Chacarita Juniors.

González had trialled for San Lorenzo de Almagro when he was 14. In May 2018, the 18-year-old signed a four-year deal with the club, who paid US$65,000 for 80% of his economic rights; two clauses would lead to future payments of $100,000 and $200,000. He was called up for one Argentine Primera División game on 7 October, remaining unused in a 2–0 loss at Banfield. In June 2019, he was loaned to Nueva Chicago of the Primera B Nacional without the option to purchase.

Remaining in the second tier but returning to his home province, González moved to Gimnasia Mendoza for 2020. He said that he had not adapted to football in Buenos Aires or the elite league. In July 2021 he went back to Deportivo Maipú on a deal until the end of 2024. He scored eight goals and assisted seven in 2023, as his team missed out on promotion.

Before the start of 2024, Sporting Cristal of the Peruvian Primera División announced the signing of González on a three-year deal, taking him out of Argentina for the first time in his career. On 9 March, he equalised in a 2–1 win away to capital city rivals Alianza Lima. In early September, having contributed 12 goals and a leading 14 assists, he was estimated to be the most valuable player in the league with a transfer value of €1.8 million.

== Personal life ==
By the time of his first professional contract at 18, González already had several tattoos, including of the Virgin Mary and a rosary. He said that he dedicated all of his goals to God.
