= Nicolás Ramírez (referee) =

- Full name: Nicolás Ramírez
- Born: November 18, 1986 (age 39); González Catán, Buenos Aires, Argentina
- Other occupation: Administrative employee

Domestic
| Years | League | Role |
| 2017– | Primera División (Argentina) | Referee |

International
| Years | League | Role |
| 2023– | FIFA listed | Referee |

Nicolás Ramírez (born 18 November 1986) is an Argentine football referee who officiates in the Argentine Primera División and has been a FIFA-listed referee since 2023.

== Early life and background ==
Ramírez was born on 18 November 1986 in González Catán, Buenos Aires Province.

Outside of refereeing, he works in administrative roles for a social work organization (obra social). Ramírez is married and has two sons, Félix and Lázaro. His lifestyle, often portrayed as humble and routine, contrasts with the high-pressure environment of Argentina's top football matches.

== Refereeing career ==
=== Domestic career ===
Ramírez began officiating in Argentina's professional football leagues during the 2010s and made his debut in the Argentine Primera División during the 2017–18 Superliga Argentina season. One of his early top-flight matches was the fixture between Chacarita Juniors and Temperley on Matchday 25 of the 2017–18 campaign.

Since then, he has refereed numerous matches in the Argentine Primera División and other national competitions. Statistical platforms record his performance data, including the number of matches, yellow and red cards, and penalties awarded.

=== International career ===
In January 2023, Ramírez was included in the official list of FIFA international referees representing Argentina, making him eligible to officiate international and continental fixtures under CONMEBOL and FIFA jurisdiction.

Argentine sports media have described Ramírez as an authoritative referee with a calm demeanor on the pitch and noted his professional attitude and balanced decision-making.
