= Francisco Fydriszewski =

Argentine footballer

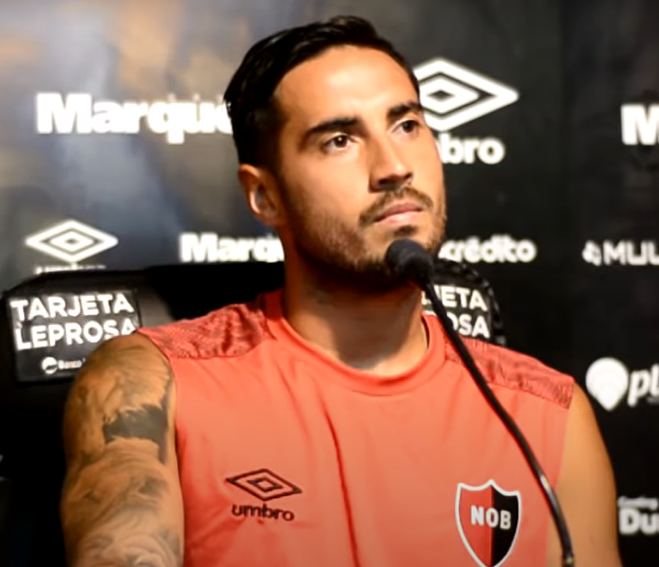
- Fydriszewski in 2019

Personal information
- Full name: Francisco David Fydriszewski
- Date of birth: 13 April 1993 (age 33)
- Place of birth: Rosario, Argentina
- Height: 1.85 m (6 ft 1 in)
- Position: Forward

Team information
- Current team: Atlético Junior
- Number: 19

Senior career*
| Years | Team | Apps | (Gls) |
| 2014–2023 | Newell's Old Boys | 19 | (3) |
| 2015–2016 | → Villa Dálmine (loan) | 29 | (9) |
| 2016–2017 | → Argentinos Juniors (loan) | 35 | (13) |
| 2017–2018 | → Lugo (loan) | 14 | (1) |
| 2018–2019 | → Deportes Antofagasta (loan) | 4 | (0) |
| 2020 | → LDU Portoviejo (loan) | 13 | (6) |
| 2021–2022 | → Aucas (loan) | 52 | (27) |
| 2023–2024 | Barcelona SC | 38 | (21) |
| 2024 | San Lorenzo | 4 | (0) |
| 2025–2026 | Independiente Medellín | 43 | (15) |
| 2026– | Atlético Junior | 10 | (2) |
- * Club domestic league appearances and goals as of 31 July 2026

Francisco David Fydriszewski (born 13 April 1993) is an Argentine professional footballer who plays as a forward for Categoría Primera A club Junior de Barranquilla.

He is often nicknamed Polaco due to his Polish heritage.
