= Juan Gabriel Benítez =

Paraguayan football referee (born 1982)

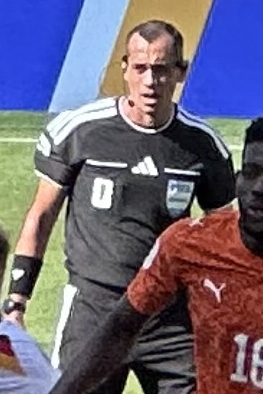
- Benítez at the 2026 FIFA World Cup
- Born: 23 October 1982 (age 43); Asunción, Paraguay

Domestic
Years	League	Role
2015–present	APF División de Honor	Referee

International
Years	League	Role
2019–present	FIFA listed	Referee

Juan Gabriel Benítez Mareco (born 23 October 1982) is a Paraguayan football referee who has been on the FIFA International Referees List since 2019.

== Career ==
Benítez was born in Asunción, Paraguay, on 23 October 1982. He played basketball in his youth, representing the youth team of Paraguay at two South American Championships in the 1990s. After reading a report about referees in the 2010 FIFA World Cup and how well-formed in languages and culture they were, Benítez decided to pursue a career as a professional referee. He began leading matches in the APF División de Honor—Paraguay's top-tier league—in 2015 and earned his FIFA badge in 2019.

Benítez has overseen important matches in his home country's league, including the Paraguayan clásico between Cerro Porteño and Club Olimpia. In 2024, the city of Luque declared Benítez persona non grata following a heated match between Sportivo Luqueño and Club Libertad where the locals saw themselves negatively affected by Benítez's decisions.

Within CONMEBOL and inter-continental tournaments, Benítez has overseen matches at Copa Sudamericana and Copa Libertadores. His performances often draw criticism when games are heated or physically intense, with some commentators like Miguel Scime of Infobae saying that Benítez handles quiet matches better. Scime alleged that Benítez's high record of yellow and red cards shows that Benítez lacks resources to deal with these matches beyond sanctions.

Other competitions for Benítez at the international level include CONMEBOL qualification games for the FIFA World Cup, the 2024 Copa América in the United States, and being selected for the 2026 FIFA World Cup.

== Selected performances ==
2026 FIFA World Cup – North America
Date	Match	Result	Round	Venue
20 June 2026	Germany – Ivory Coast	2–1	Group stage	BMO Field, Toronto
