= 2026 Copa Sudamericana group stage =

The 2026 Copa Sudamericana group stage was played from 7 April to 28 May 2026. A total of 32 teams competed in the group stage to decide 16 of the 24 places in the final stages of the 2026 Copa Sudamericana.

== Draw ==
The draw for the group stage was held on 19 March 2026, 20:00 PYT (UTC−3), at the CONMEBOL Convention Centre in Luque, Paraguay.

Teams were seeded by their CONMEBOL Clubs ranking as of 15 December 2025 (shown in parentheses), taking into account the following three factors:

1. Performance in the last 10 years, taking into account Copa Libertadores and Copa Sudamericana results in the period 2016–2025.
2. Historical coefficient, taking into account Copa Libertadores and Copa Sudamericana results in the period 1960–2015 and 2002–2015 respectively.
3. Local tournament champion, with bonus points awarded to domestic league champions of the last 10 years.

For the group stage, the 32 teams were drawn into eight groups (Groups A–H) of four containing a team from each of the four pots. The four losers of the Copa Libertadores third stage were seeded into Pot 4. Teams from the same association could not be drawn into the same group.

Group stage draw
Pot 1	Pot 2	Pot 3	Pot 4
(Argentina) River Plate (3); (Brazil) Atlético Mineiro (6); (Brazil) São Paulo (7); (Argentina) Racing (9); (Brazil) Grêmio (14); (Paraguay) Olimpia (15); (Brazil) Santos (27); (Colombia) América de Cali (36)	(Argentina) San Lorenzo (37); (Brazil) Red Bull Bragantino (43); (Chile) Palestino (52); (Colombia) Millonarios (54); (Venezuela) Caracas (56); (Brazil) Vasco da Gama (61); (Peru) Cienciano (76); (Argentina) Tigre (97)	(Chile) Audax Italiano (100); (Bolivia) Blooming (110); (Venezuela) Academia Puerto Cabello (116); (Uruguay) Boston River (123); (Uruguay) Montevideo City Torque (135); (Ecuador) Deportivo Cuenca (137); (Bolivia) Independiente Petrolero (159); (Ecuador) Macará (211)	(Peru) Alianza Atlético (283); (Argentina) Barracas Central (No rank); (Argentina) Deportivo Riestra (No rank); (Paraguay) Recoleta (No rank); (Uruguay) Juventud (287); (Chile) O'Higgins (166); (Venezuela) Carabobo (128); (Brazil) Botafogo (19)

Notes

1. ^{CLQ3} The Copa Libertadores third stage losers were seeded in Pot 4.

The following are the four losers of the third stage of the 2026 Copa Libertadores qualifying stages which joined the 12 direct entrants and the 16 Copa Sudamericana first stage winners in the group stage.

Match	Third stage losers
G1	(Uruguay) Juventud
G2	(Chile) O'Higgins
G3	(Venezuela) Carabobo
G4	(Brazil) Botafogo

== Format ==
In the group stage, each group was played on a home-and-away round-robin basis. The winners of each group advanced to the round of 16 of the final stages, whilst the runners-up of each group advanced to the knockout round play-offs of the final stages.

=== Tiebreakers ===
Tiebreakers were changed starting from this edition, with head-to-head performance being prioritized over overall goal difference and goals scored. Disciplinary performance (red and yellow cards) was also included, removing away goals scored as well as placement in the CONMEBOL ranking as tiebreakers. The full order of tiebreaking criteria, according to Regulations Article 2.4.3, was as follows:

1. Points
2. Head-to-head points
3. Head-to-head goal difference
4. Head-to-head goals scored
5. Overall goal difference
6. Overall goals scored
7. Red cards
8. Yellow cards
9. Drawing of lots

== Schedule ==
The schedule of each matchday was as follows (Regulations Article 2.2.2).

Matchday	Dates	Matches
Matchday 1	7–9 April 2026	Team 4 vs. Team 2, Team 3 vs. Team 1
Matchday 2	14–16 April 2026	Team 2 vs. Team 3, Team 1 vs. Team 4
Matchday 3	28–30 April 2026	Team 2 vs. Team 1, Team 4 vs. Team 3
Matchday 4	5–7 May 2026	Team 3 vs. Team 2, Team 4 vs. Team 1
Matchday 5	19–21 May 2026	Team 1 vs. Team 2, Team 3 vs. Team 4
Matchday 6	26–28 May 2026	Team 1 vs. Team 3, Team 2 vs. Team 4

== Groups ==
=== Group A ===
Pos	Team	Pld	W	D	L	GF	GA	GD	Pts	Qualification	MAC	TIG	AME	AAS
1	(Ecuador) Macará	6	2	4	0	6	3	+3	10	Advance to round of 16	—	2–2	1–1	0–0
2	(Argentina) Tigre	6	2	3	1	8	5	+3	9 (Note: Head-to-head points: Tigre 4, América de Cali 1.)	Advance to knockout round play-offs	0–1	—	2–0	2–0
3	(Colombia) América de Cali	6	2	3	1	6	5	+1	9		0–0	1–1	—	2–1
4	(Peru) Alianza Atlético	6	0	2	4	2	9	−7	2		0–2	1–1	0–2	—

Source: CONMEBOL
Notes:
7 April 2026
21:00 UTC−5

Alianza Atlético (Peru)	1–1	(Argentina) Tigre
Robaldo 73'	Report	Russo 9'

Estadio Miguel Grau, Callao (Note: Alianza Atlético played their home matches at Estadio Miguel Grau, Callao instead of their regular stadium Estadio Campeones del 36, Sullana which did not meet CONMEBOL requirements.)
Attendance: 1,267
Referee: Paulo Zanovelli (Brazil)
9 April 2026
19:30 UTC−5 (Note: The kickoff of the Macará vs. América de Cali match, originally scheduled for 21:00 local time, was brought forward to 19:30 local time.)

Macará (Ecuador)	1–1	(Colombia) América de Cali
Escobar 12' (o.g.)	Report	Valencia 24'

Estadio Bellavista, Ambato
Referee: Carlos Benítez (Paraguay)

15 April 2026
21:00 UTC−5

América de Cali (Colombia)	2–1	(Peru) Alianza Atlético
Valencia 44'; Guzmán 55' (pen.)	Report	Muñoz 31'

Estadio Pascual Guerrero, Cali
Referee: Anderson Daronco (Brazil)
16 April 2026
19:00 UTC−3

Tigre (Argentina)	0–1	(Ecuador) Macará
	Report	Paz 54'

Estadio José Dellagiovanna, Victoria
Referee: Rafael Klein (Brazil)

30 April 2026
21:00 UTC−3

Tigre (Argentina)	2–0	(Colombia) América de Cali
Garay 14'; Russo 28'	Report

Estadio José Dellagiovanna, Victoria
Referee: Mathías De Armas (Uruguay)
30 April 2026
21:00 UTC−5

Alianza Atlético (Peru)	0–2	(Ecuador) Macará
	Report	Posse 4'; Miranda 34'

Estadio Miguel Grau, Callao
Referee: David Ojeda (Paraguay)

6 May 2026
19:00 UTC−5

Macará (Ecuador)	2–2	(Argentina) Tigre
Zenobio 38' (o.g.); Posse 75'	Report	Romero 17', 51'

Estadio Bellavista, Ambato
Referee: Paulo Zanovelli (Brazil)
6 May 2026
21:00 UTC−5

Alianza Atlético (Peru)	0–2	(Colombia) América de Cali
	Report	Murillo 56'; Ángel 68' (pen.)

Estadio Miguel Grau, Callao
Referee: Ramon Abatti (Brazil)

19 May 2026
21:00 UTC−5

América de Cali (Colombia)	1–1	(Argentina) Tigre
Ángel 53'	Report	Romero 11'

Estadio Pascual Guerrero, Cali
Referee: Bruno Arleu (Brazil)
21 May 2026
21:00 UTC−5

Macará (Ecuador)	0–0	(Peru) Alianza Atlético
	Report

Estadio Bellavista, Ambato
Referee: Matheus Candançan (Brazil)

28 May 2026
19:30 UTC−5

América de Cali (Colombia)	0–0	(Ecuador) Macará
	Report

Estadio Pascual Guerrero, Cali
Referee: Mario Díaz de Vivar (Paraguay)
28 May 2026
21:30 UTC−3

Tigre (Argentina)	2–0	(Peru) Alianza Atlético
Saralegui 47'; Barrionuevo 77'	Report

Estadio José Dellagiovanna, Victoria
Referee: David Ojeda (Paraguay)

=== Group B ===
Pos	Team	Pld	W	D	L	GF	GA	GD	Pts	Qualification	CAM	CIE	JUV	APC
1	(Brazil) Atlético Mineiro	6	3	1	2	8	6	+2	10	Advance to round of 16	—	2–0	2–1	1–0
2	(Peru) Cienciano	6	2	2	2	5	7	−2	8	Advance to knockout round play-offs	1–0	—	1–1	2–0
3	(Uruguay) Juventud	6	1	4	1	10	7	+3	7 (Note: Head-to-head points: Juventud 4, Academia Puerto Cabello 1.)		2–2	1–1	—	4–0
4	(Venezuela) Academia Puerto Cabello	6	2	1	3	6	9	−3	7		2–1	3–0	1–1	—

Source: CONMEBOL
Notes:
8 April 2026
22:00 UTC−4

Academia Puerto Cabello (Venezuela)	2–1	(Brazil) Atlético Mineiro
Castillo 16'; Ramos 39'	Report	Dudu 27'

Estadio Misael Delgado, Valencia (Note: Academia Puerto Cabello played their home matches at Estadio Misael Delgado, Valencia instead of their regular stadium La Bombonerita, Puerto Cabello which did not meet CONMEBOL requirements.)
Referee: Yael Falcón Pérez (Argentina)
9 April 2026
19:00 UTC−3

Juventud (Uruguay)	1–1	(Peru) Cienciano
Roldán 36'	Report	Garcés 88'

Estadio Centenario, Montevideo (Note: Juventud played their home matches at Estadio Centenario, Montevideo instead of their regular stadium Estadio Parque Artigas, Las Piedras which did not meet CONMEBOL requirements.)
Referee: Bryan Loayza (Ecuador)

16 April 2026
19:00 UTC−3

Atlético Mineiro (Brazil)	2–1	(Uruguay) Juventud
Bernard 43'; Cassierra 90'	Report	F. Pérez 55'

Arena MRV, Belo Horizonte
Attendance: 18,120
Referee: Carlos Ortega (Colombia)
16 April 2026
21:00 UTC−5

Cienciano (Peru)	2–0	(Venezuela) Academia Puerto Cabello
Garcés 11'; Hohberg 79'	Report

Estadio Garcilaso, Cusco
Referee: Ivo Méndez (Bolivia)

29 April 2026
19:00 UTC−3

Juventud (Uruguay)	4–0	(Venezuela) Academia Puerto Cabello
Mimbacas 6', 45+1' (pen.); Roldán 25'; Lago 45+3'	Report

Estadio Centenario, Montevideo
Referee: Nazareno Arasa (Argentina)
29 April 2026
19:30 UTC−5

Cienciano (Peru)	1–0	(Brazil) Atlético Mineiro
Bandiera 30'	Report

Estadio Garcilaso, Cusco
Referee: Yael Falcón Pérez (Argentina)

5 May 2026
19:00 UTC−3

Juventud (Uruguay)	2–2	(Brazil) Atlético Mineiro
Lago 78'; M. Pérez 87'	Report	Minda 37'; Vitor Hugo 77'

Estadio Centenario, Montevideo
Referee: Leandro Rey Hilfer (Argentina)
5 May 2026
20:30 UTC−4

Academia Puerto Cabello (Venezuela)	3–0	(Peru) Cienciano
González 33'; Flores 49'; Castillo 60'	Report

Estadio Misael Delgado, Valencia
Referee: Derlis Benítez (Paraguay)

21 May 2026
19:00 UTC−3

Atlético Mineiro (Brazil)	2–0	(Peru) Cienciano
Renan Lodi 27'; Bernard 39'	Report

Arena MRV, Belo Horizonte
Referee: Carlos Ortega (Colombia)
21 May 2026
18:00 UTC−4

Academia Puerto Cabello (Venezuela)	1–1	(Uruguay) Juventud
Flores 26'	Report	Peralta 6'

Estadio Misael Delgado, Valencia
Referee: Diego Ulloa (Colombia)

27 May 2026
19:00 UTC−3

Atlético Mineiro (Brazil)	1–0	(Venezuela) Academia Puerto Cabello
Bernard 62'	Report

Arena MRV, Belo Horizonte
Referee: Leandro Rey Hilfer (Argentina)
27 May 2026
17:00 UTC−5

Cienciano (Peru)	1–1	(Uruguay) Juventud
Becerra 20'	Report	Cecchini 62'

Estadio Garcilaso, Cusco
Referee: Yael Falcón Pérez (Argentina)

=== Group C ===
Pos	Team	Pld	W	D	L	GF	GA	GD	Pts	Qualification	SPA	OHI	MIL	BOR
1	(Brazil) São Paulo	6	3	3	0	6	1	+5	12	Advance to round of 16	—	2–0	1–1	2–0
2	(Chile) O'Higgins	6	3	1	2	8	6	+2	10	Advance to knockout round play-offs	0–0	—	2–0	2–0
3	(Colombia) Millonarios	6	2	2	2	7	7	0	8		0–0	1–2	—	1–0
4	(Uruguay) Boston River	6	1	0	5	5	12	−7	3		0–1	3–2	2–4	—

Source: CONMEBOL
7 April 2026
20:00 UTC−4

O'Higgins (Chile)	2–0	(Colombia) Millonarios
Castillo 12'; González 83'	Report

Estadio El Teniente, Rancagua
Referee: Roberto Pérez (Peru)
7 April 2026
21:30 UTC−3

Boston River (Uruguay)	0–1	(Brazil) São Paulo
	Report	Bobadilla 61'

Estadio Centenario, Montevideo (Note: Boston River played their home matches at Estadio Centenario, Montevideo instead of their regular stadium Estadio Campeones Olímpicos, Florida which did not meet CONMEBOL requirements.)
Referee: Leandro Rey Hilfer (Argentina)

14 April 2026
19:00 UTC−3

São Paulo (Brazil)	2–0	(Chile) O'Higgins
Luciano 8'; Artur 55'	Report

Estádio do Morumbi, São Paulo
Attendance: 19,990
Referee: Darío Herrera (Argentina)
15 April 2026 (Note: The Millonarios vs. Boston River match, originally scheduled for 14 April, was rescheduled to 15 April.)
21:00 UTC−5

Millonarios (Colombia)	1–0	(Uruguay) Boston River
Quintero 84'	Report

Estadio El Campín, Bogotá
Attendance: 28,597
Referee: Guillermo Guerrero (Ecuador)

28 April 2026
19:30 UTC−5

Millonarios (Colombia)	0–0	(Brazil) São Paulo
	Report

Estadio El Campín, Bogotá
Referee: Juan Gabriel Benítez (Paraguay)
28 April 2026
22:00 UTC−4

O'Higgins (Chile)	2–0	(Uruguay) Boston River
Sarrafiore 4'; González 59'	Report

Estadio El Teniente, Rancagua
Referee: Augusto Aragón (Ecuador)

7 May 2026
19:00 UTC−3

Boston River (Uruguay)	2–4	(Colombia) Millonarios
Hornos 18'; González 75'	Report	Contreras 50' (pen.), 85'; L. Castro 81' (pen.); B. Castro 90+6'

Estadio Centenario, Montevideo
Referee: Carlos Gariano (Argentina)
7 May 2026
18:00 UTC−4

O'Higgins (Chile)	0–0	(Brazil) São Paulo
	Report

Estadio El Teniente, Rancagua
Referee: Yael Falcón Pérez (Argentina)

19 May 2026
21:30 UTC−3

São Paulo (Brazil)	1–1	(Colombia) Millonarios
Luciano 9'	Report	Cabezas Hurtado 81'

Estádio do Morumbi, São Paulo
Referee: Kevin Ortega (Peru)
20 May 2026
19:00 UTC−3

Boston River (Uruguay)	3–2	(Chile) O'Higgins
Muñoa 21'; González 41'; Ramírez 65'	Report	Vecino 48'; Castillo 78'

Estadio Centenario, Montevideo
Referee: Ivo Méndez (Bolivia)

26 May 2026
19:00 UTC−3

São Paulo (Brazil)	2–0	(Uruguay) Boston River
Artur 5'; Acosta 18' (o.g.)	Report

Estádio do Morumbi, São Paulo
Referee: Augusto Menéndez (Peru)
26 May 2026
17:00 UTC−5

Millonarios (Colombia)	1–2	(Chile) O'Higgins
Contreras 54'	Report	Yáñez 7'; Robledo 38'

Estadio El Campín, Bogotá
Referee: Darío Herrera (Argentina)

=== Group D ===
Pos	Team	Pld	W	D	L	GF	GA	GD	Pts	Qualification	REC	SAN	SLO	CUE
1	(Paraguay) Recoleta	6	1	5	0	6	5	+1	8	Advance to round of 16	—	1–1	1–1	0–0
2	(Brazil) Santos	6	1	4	1	8	6	+2	7	Advance to knockout round play-offs	1–1	—	2–2	3–0
3	(Argentina) San Lorenzo	6	1	4	1	6	5	+1	7		0–1	1–1	—	2–0
4	(Ecuador) Deportivo Cuenca	6	1	3	2	3	7	−4	6		2–2	1–0	0–0	—

Source: CONMEBOL
8 April 2026
19:00 UTC−3

Recoleta (Paraguay)	1–1	(Argentina) San Lorenzo
Wlk 13'	Report	Auzmendi 17'

Estadio Defensores del Chaco, Asunción (Note: Recoleta played their home matches at Estadio Defensores del Chaco, Asunción instead of their regular stadium Estadio Roque Battilana, Asunción which did not meet CONMEBOL requirements.)
Referee: Cristian Garay (Chile)
8 April 2026
17:00 UTC−5

Deportivo Cuenca (Ecuador)	1–0	(Brazil) Santos
Brazão 60' (o.g.)	Report

Estadio Alejandro Serrano Aguilar, Cuenca
Referee: Gery Vargas (Bolivia)

14 April 2026
21:30 UTC−3

Santos (Brazil)	1–1	(Paraguay) Recoleta
Neymar 4'	Report	Ortiz 45+1' (pen.)

Estádio Urbano Caldeira, Santos
Attendance: 9,648
Referee: Fernando Véjar (Chile)
16 April 2026
21:30 UTC−3

San Lorenzo (Argentina)	2–0	(Ecuador) Deportivo Cuenca
Romaña 62'; Tripichio 72'	Report

Estadio Pedro Bidegain, Buenos Aires
Referee: Yender Herrera (Venezuela)

28 April 2026
19:00 UTC−3

San Lorenzo (Argentina)	1–1	(Brazil) Santos
Cuello 27'	Report	Gabriel 33'

Estadio Pedro Bidegain, Buenos Aires
Referee: Jhon Ospina (Colombia)
28 April 2026
21:30 UTC−3

Recoleta (Paraguay)	0–0	(Ecuador) Deportivo Cuenca
	Report

Estadio Defensores del Chaco, Asunción
Referee: Jordi Espinoza (Peru)

5 May 2026
21:30 UTC−3

Recoleta (Paraguay)	1–1	(Brazil) Santos
Galeano 86'	Report	Neymar 41'

Estadio Río Parapití, Pedro Juan Caballero (Note: Recoleta played their home match against Santos at Estadio Río Parapití, Pedro Juan Caballero instead of the originally scheduled Estadio Defensores del Chaco, Asunción.)
Referee: Cristian Garay (Chile)
5 May 2026
21:00 UTC−5

Deportivo Cuenca (Ecuador)	0–0	(Argentina) San Lorenzo
	Report

Estadio Alejandro Serrano Aguilar, Cuenca
Referee: José Cabero (Chile)

19 May 2026
21:00 UTC−5

Deportivo Cuenca (Ecuador)	2–2	(Paraguay) Recoleta
Cardozo 26' (o.g.); González 56'	Report	Ríos 12'; Noguera 37'

Estadio Alejandro Serrano Aguilar, Cuenca
Referee: Roberto Pérez (Peru)
20 May 2026
19:00 UTC−3

Santos (Brazil)	2–2	(Argentina) San Lorenzo
Bontempo 1'; Gabriel 45+2'	Report	De Ritis 72'; Auzmendi 85'

Estádio Urbano Caldeira, Santos
Referee: Alexis Herrera (Venezuela)

26 May 2026
21:30 UTC−3

Santos (Brazil)	3–0	(Ecuador) Deportivo Cuenca
Gabriel 14'; Ferrero 49' (o.g.); Bontempo 56'	Report

Estádio Urbano Caldeira, Santos
Referee: Jhon Ospina (Colombia)
26 May 2026
21:30 UTC−3

San Lorenzo (Argentina)	0–1	(Paraguay) Recoleta
	Report	Wlk 37'

Estadio Pedro Bidegain, Buenos Aires
Referee: Carlos Ortega (Colombia)

=== Group E ===
Pos	Team	Pld	W	D	L	GF	GA	GD	Pts	Qualification	BOT	CAR	RAC	IPE
1	(Brazil) Botafogo	6	5	1	0	15	5	+10	16	Advance to round of 16	—	1–1	2–1	3–0
2	(Venezuela) Caracas	6	2	3	1	9	9	0	9	Advance to knockout round play-offs	1–3	—	1–1	1–0
3	(Argentina) Racing	6	2	2	2	11	9	+2	8		2–3	2–2	—	2–0
4	(Bolivia) Independiente Petrolero	6	0	0	6	3	15	−12	0		0–3	2–3	1–3	—

Source: CONMEBOL
7 April 2026
18:00 UTC−4

Independiente Petrolero (Bolivia)	1–3	(Argentina) Racing
Thomaz 45+8' (pen.)	Report	G. Sosa 27'; Martirena 37'; Fernández 90+4'

Estadio Olímpico Patria, Sucre
Referee: Augusto Menéndez (Peru)
9 April 2026
19:00 UTC−3

Botafogo (Brazil)	1–1	(Venezuela) Caracas
Cabral 50'	Report	Correa 43'

Estádio Olímpico Nilton Santos, Rio de Janeiro
Attendance: 11,931
Referee: Kevin Ortega (Peru)

15 April 2026
18:00 UTC−4

Caracas (Venezuela)	1–0	(Bolivia) Independiente Petrolero
Correa 55'	Report

Estadio Olímpico de la UCV, Caracas
Referee: Bryan Loayza (Ecuador)
15 April 2026
19:00 UTC−3

Racing (Argentina)	2–3	(Brazil) Botafogo
S. Sosa 4'; Martínez 64'	Report	Cabral 23'; Júnior Santos 41'; Danilo 90+3'

El Cilindro, Avellaneda
Attendance: 0 (Note: Racing played their home matches behind closed doors as they were punished for the use of pyrotechnics by their fans in their 2025 Copa Libertadores semi-final match against Flamengo.)
Referee: Cristian Garay (Chile)

28 April 2026
19:00 UTC−3

Botafogo (Brazil)	3–0	(Bolivia) Independiente Petrolero
Ponte 15'; Montoro 62'; Newton 77'	Report

Estádio Olímpico Nilton Santos, Rio de Janeiro
Referee: Fernando Véjar (Chile)
29 April 2026
18:00 UTC−4

Caracas (Venezuela)	1–1	(Argentina) Racing
Yendis 46'	Report	Pérez 42'

Estadio Olímpico de la UCV, Caracas
Referee: Andrés Matonte (Uruguay)

5 May 2026
18:00 UTC−4

Independiente Petrolero (Bolivia)	2–3	(Venezuela) Caracas
Rivas 55'; J. Cristaldo 58'	Report	Rodríguez 4' (o.g.); Fernández 15'; Correa 67'

Estadio Olímpico Patria, Sucre
Referee: Joel Alarcón (Peru)
6 May 2026
21:30 UTC−3

Botafogo (Brazil)	2–1	(Argentina) Racing
Di Cesare 19' (o.g.); Danilo 74'	Report	Martínez 49'

Estádio Olímpico Nilton Santos, Rio de Janeiro
Referee: Wilmar Roldán (Colombia)

20 May 2026
21:00 UTC−3

Independiente Petrolero (Bolivia)	0–3	(Brazil) Botafogo
	Report	Medina 24'; Barrera 82'; Gutiérrez 87' (o.g.)

Estadio La Huerta, Asunción (Paraguay) (Note: The Independiente Petrolero v Botafogo match was moved to Estadio La Huerta in Asunción (Paraguay) due to civil unrest in Bolivia.)
Referee: Guillermo Guerrero (Ecuador)
21 May 2026
21:00 UTC−3

Racing (Argentina)	2–2	(Venezuela) Caracas
Martirena 5'; Martínez 37' (pen.)	Report	Rojas 1' (o.g.); Gudiño 74'

El Cilindro, Avellaneda
Attendance: 0
Referee: Jhon Ospina (Colombia)

27 May 2026
19:00 UTC−3

Racing (Argentina)	2–0	(Bolivia) Independiente Petrolero
Vergara 18'; Miljevic 59'	Report

El Cilindro, Avellaneda
Attendance: 0
Referee: Augusto Aragón (Ecuador)
27 May 2026
18:00 UTC−4

Caracas (Venezuela)	1–3	(Brazil) Botafogo
Ramos 36' (o.g.)	Report	Ramos 61'; Kauan Toledo 72'; Correa 90+2'

Estadio Olímpico de la UCV, Caracas
Referee: Carlos Betancur (Colombia)

=== Group F ===
Pos	Team	Pld	W	D	L	GF	GA	GD	Pts	Qualification	MCT	GRE	DRI	PAL
1	(Uruguay) Montevideo City Torque	6	4	1	1	11	5	+6	13	Advance to round of 16	—	1–0	4–1	1–0
2	(Brazil) Grêmio	6	3	2	1	8	3	+5	11	Advance to knockout round play-offs	2–2	—	1–0	2–0
3	(Argentina) Deportivo Riestra	6	1	2	3	4	10	−6	5		2–1	0–3	—	0–0
4	(Chile) Palestino	6	0	3	3	1	6	−5	3		0–2	0–0	1–1	—

Source: CONMEBOL
8 April 2026
19:00 UTC−3

Deportivo Riestra (Argentina)	0–0	(Chile) Palestino
	Report

Estadio Pedro Bidegain, Buenos Aires (Note: Deportivo Riestra played their home matches at Estadio Pedro Bidegain, Buenos Aires instead of their regular stadium Estadio Guillermo Laza, Buenos Aires which did not meet CONMEBOL requirements.)
Referee: Guillermo Guerrero (Ecuador)
8 April 2026
21:30 UTC−3

Montevideo City Torque (Uruguay)	1–0	(Brazil) Grêmio
Agüero 49'	Report

Estadio Centenario, Montevideo (Note: Montevideo City Torque played their home matches at Estadio Centenario, Montevideo instead of their regular stadium Estadio Charrúa, Montevideo which did not meet CONMEBOL requirements.)
Referee: Augusto Aragón (Ecuador)

14 April 2026
19:00 UTC−3

Grêmio (Brazil)	1–0	(Argentina) Deportivo Riestra
Amuzu 87'	Report

Arena do Grêmio, Porto Alegre
Attendance: 13,518
Referee: Gery Vargas (Bolivia)
14 April 2026
20:30 UTC−4

Palestino (Chile)	0–2	(Uruguay) Montevideo City Torque
	Report	Rodríguez 11'; Gallegos 63' (o.g.)

Estadio Municipal de La Cisterna, Santiago
Referee: Derlis Benítez (Paraguay)

29 April 2026
19:00 UTC−3

Deportivo Riestra (Argentina)	2–1	(Uruguay) Montevideo City Torque
Randazzo 26', 40'	Report	Silvera 19'

Estadio Pedro Bidegain, Buenos Aires
Referee: Bryan Loayza (Ecuador)
29 April 2026
20:30 UTC−4

Palestino (Chile)	0–0	(Brazil) Grêmio
	Report

Estadio Municipal de La Cisterna, Santiago
Referee: Guillermo Guerrero (Ecuador)

5 May 2026
19:00 UTC−3

Deportivo Riestra (Argentina)	0–3	(Brazil) Grêmio
	Report	Carlos Vinícius 30' (pen.); Amuzu 59'; Braithwaite 73'

Estadio Pedro Bidegain, Buenos Aires
Referee: Mario Díaz de Vivar (Paraguay)
6 May 2026
19:00 UTC−3

Montevideo City Torque (Uruguay)	1–0	(Chile) Palestino
Pizzichillo 51'	Report

Estadio Centenario, Montevideo
Referee: Yender Herrera (Venezuela)

19 May 2026
19:00 UTC−3

Montevideo City Torque (Uruguay)	4–1	(Argentina) Deportivo Riestra
Arce 8' (o.g.); Goitía 28' (o.g.); Rodríguez 57'; Agüero 89'	Report	Díaz 61'

Estadio Centenario, Montevideo
Referee: Augusto Aragón (Ecuador)
20 May 2026
21:00 UTC−3

Grêmio (Brazil)	2–0	(Chile) Palestino
Braithwaite 4'; Pavon 68'	Report

Arena do Grêmio, Porto Alegre
Referee: Carlos Benítez (Paraguay)

26 May 2026
19:00 UTC−3

Grêmio (Brazil)	2–2	(Uruguay) Montevideo City Torque
Gabriel Mec 47'; Carlos Vinícius 89' (pen.)	Report	Rodríguez 37'; Pizzichillo 83'

Arena do Grêmio, Porto Alegre
Referee: Jesús Valenzuela (Venezuela)
26 May 2026
18:00 UTC−4

Palestino (Chile)	1–1	(Argentina) Deportivo Riestra
Da Silva 42'	Report	Randazzo 28'

Estadio Municipal de La Cisterna, Santiago
Referee: Michael Espinoza (Peru)

=== Group G ===
Pos	Team	Pld	W	D	L	GF	GA	GD	Pts	Qualification	OLI	VAS	AUD	BAR
1	(Paraguay) Olimpia	6	4	1	1	10	6	+4	13	Advance to round of 16	—	3–1	3–1	0–0
2	(Brazil) Vasco da Gama	6	3	1	2	10	6	+4	10	Advance to knockout round play-offs	3–0	—	1–2	3–0
3	(Chile) Audax Italiano	6	2	1	3	7	9	−2	7		0–2	1–2	—	2–0
4	(Argentina) Barracas Central	6	0	3	3	2	8	−6	3		1–2	0–0	1–1	—

Source: CONMEBOL
7 April 2026
19:00 UTC−3

Barracas Central (Argentina)	0–0	(Brazil) Vasco da Gama
	Report

Estadio Florencio Sola, Banfield (Note: Barracas Central played their home matches at Estadio Florencio Sola, Banfield instead of their regular stadium Estadio Claudio Chiqui Tapia, Buenos Aires which did not meet CONMEBOL requirements.)
Referee: Carlos Betancur (Colombia)
8 April 2026
20:00 UTC−4

Audax Italiano (Chile)	0–2	(Paraguay) Olimpia
	Report	Lezcano 23'; Alfaro 35'

Estadio Bicentenario de La Florida, Santiago
Referee: Andrés Matonte (Uruguay)

14 April 2026
21:00 UTC−3

Vasco da Gama (Brazil)	1–2	(Chile) Audax Italiano
Brenner 45+3'	Report	Vadulli 62'; Troyansky 86' (pen.)

Estádio São Januário, Rio de Janeiro
Attendance: 13,084
Referee: Hernán Heras (Uruguay)
15 April 2026
21:00 UTC−3

Olimpia (Paraguay)	0–0	(Argentina) Barracas Central
	Report

Estadio Defensores del Chaco, Asunción (Note: Olimpia played their home matches at Estadio Defensores del Chaco, Asunción instead of their regular stadium Estadio Osvaldo Domínguez Dibb, Asunción which was being rebuilt.)
Referee: Andrés Rojas (Colombia)

28 April 2026
21:00 UTC−3

Barracas Central (Argentina)	1–1	(Chile) Audax Italiano
Bogarín 42'	Report	Loyola 90+5'

Estadio Florencio Sola, Banfield
Referee: Kevin Ortega (Peru)
30 April 2026
19:00 UTC−3

Vasco da Gama (Brazil)	3–0	(Paraguay) Olimpia
Rodríguez 39'; Nuno Moreira 51'; Adson 55'	Report

Estádio São Januário, Rio de Janeiro
Referee: Jesús Valenzuela (Venezuela)

6 May 2026
18:00 UTC−4

Audax Italiano (Chile)	1–2	(Brazil) Vasco da Gama
Saldivia 5' (o.g.)	Report	Spinelli 64' (pen.); França 71'

Estadio Bicentenario de La Florida, Santiago
Referee: Jhon Ospina (Colombia)
6 May 2026
21:00 UTC−3

Barracas Central (Argentina)	1–2	(Paraguay) Olimpia
Morales 9'	Report	Cardozo 34'; Franco 90'

Estadio Florencio Sola, Banfield
Referee: Andrés Matonte (Uruguay)

19 May 2026
18:00 UTC−4

Audax Italiano (Chile)	2–0	(Argentina) Barracas Central
Piña 45'; Coelho 88'	Report

Estadio Bicentenario de La Florida, Santiago
Referee: Gery Vargas (Bolivia)
20 May 2026
19:00 UTC−3

Olimpia (Paraguay)	3–1	(Brazil) Vasco da Gama
Gamarra 67'; Sandoval 85'; Ferreira 90+4'	Report	Cuesta 45+4'

Estadio Defensores del Chaco, Asunción
Referee: Wilmar Roldán (Colombia)

27 May 2026
19:00 UTC−3

Olimpia (Paraguay)	3–1	(Chile) Audax Italiano
Rodríguez 71'; Quintana 72'; Cardozo 75'	Report	Cáceres 66' (o.g.)

Estadio Defensores del Chaco, Asunción
Referee: Gustavo Tejera (Uruguay)
27 May 2026
19:00 UTC−3

Vasco da Gama (Brazil)	3–0	(Argentina) Barracas Central
Adson 32', 45+2'; Rojas 55'	Report

Estádio São Januário, Rio de Janeiro
Referee: Esteban Ostojich (Uruguay)

=== Group H ===
Pos	Team	Pld	W	D	L	GF	GA	GD	Pts	Qualification	RIV	RBB	CBO	BLO
1	(Argentina) River Plate	6	4	2	0	9	3	+6	14	Advance to round of 16	—	1–1	1–0	3–0
2	(Brazil) Red Bull Bragantino	6	3	1	2	12	5	+7	10	Advance to knockout round play-offs	0–1	—	2–0	3–2
3	(Venezuela) Carabobo	6	3	0	3	6	5	+1	9		1–2	1–0	—	2–0
4	(Bolivia) Blooming	6	0	1	5	3	17	−14	1		1–1	0–6	0–2	—

Source: CONMEBOL
8 April 2026 (Note: The Blooming vs. River Plate match, originally scheduled for 9 April, was rescheduled to 8 April.)
20:30 UTC−4

Blooming (Bolivia)	1–1	(Argentina) River Plate
Vásquez 53'	Report	Driussi 35'

Estadio Ramón Tahuichi Aguilera, Santa Cruz de la Sierra
Referee: Andrés Rojas (Colombia)
9 April 2026
20:30 UTC−4

Carabobo (Venezuela)	1–0	(Brazil) Red Bull Bragantino
Neira 9'	Report

Estadio Misael Delgado, Valencia
Referee: Hernán Heras (Uruguay)

15 April 2026
21:30 UTC−3

River Plate (Argentina)	1–0	(Venezuela) Carabobo
Driussi 66'	Report

Estadio Monumental, Buenos Aires
Referee: Kevin Ortega (Peru)
16 April 2026
21:30 UTC−3

Red Bull Bragantino (Brazil)	3–2	(Bolivia) Blooming
Fernando 16' (pen.); Pitta 64', 90+6'	Report	Hinojosa 45+1'; Villarroel 53' (pen.)

Estádio Cícero de Souza Marques, Bragança Paulista
Attendance: 2,358
Referee: Carlos Benítez (Paraguay)

30 April 2026
18:00 UTC−4

Carabobo (Venezuela)	2–0	(Bolivia) Blooming
Tortolero 6', 39'	Report

Estadio Misael Delgado, Valencia
Referee: Anthony Díaz (Ecuador)
30 April 2026
21:30 UTC−3

Red Bull Bragantino (Brazil)	0–1	(Argentina) River Plate
	Report	Martínez Quarta 90+3'

Estádio Cícero de Souza Marques, Bragança Paulista
Referee: Wilmar Roldán (Colombia)

7 May 2026
20:30 UTC−4

Blooming (Bolivia)	0–6	(Brazil) Red Bull Bragantino
	Report	Rodriguinho 5', 61'; Gustavo Neves 11'; Eduardo Sasha 45'; Gustavo Marques 49'; Fernando 59'

Estadio Ramón Tahuichi Aguilera, Santa Cruz de la Sierra
Referee: Augusto Menéndez (Peru)
7 May 2026
20:30 UTC−4

Carabobo (Venezuela)	1–2	(Argentina) River Plate
Núñez 77' (pen.)	Report	Meza 59'; Salas 90+6'

Estadio Misael Delgado, Valencia
Referee: Derlis López (Paraguay)

20 May 2026
21:30 UTC−3

River Plate (Argentina)	1–1	(Brazil) Red Bull Bragantino
Pereyra 90+3'	Report	Alix Vinicius 35'

Estadio Monumental, Buenos Aires
Referee: Gustavo Tejera (Uruguay)
21 May 2026
20:30 UTC−4

Blooming (Bolivia)	0–2	(Venezuela) Carabobo
	Report	Ramírez 10'; Mendoza 56'

Estadio Ramón Tahuichi Aguilera, Santa Cruz de la Sierra
Referee: Mathías De Armas (Uruguay)

27 May 2026
21:30 UTC−3

River Plate (Argentina)	3–0	(Bolivia) Blooming
Salas 57'; Vera 72' (pen.); Silva 84'	Report

Estadio Monumental, Buenos Aires
Referee: Roberto Pérez (Peru)
27 May 2026
21:30 UTC−3

Red Bull Bragantino (Brazil)	2–0	(Venezuela) Carabobo
Pitta 76'; Fernando 90+3'	Report

Estádio Cícero de Souza Marques, Bragança Paulista
Referee: Andrés Rojas (Colombia)
