= 2026 Copa Sudamericana final stages =

The 2026 Copa Sudamericana final stages were played from 21 July to 21 November 2026. A total of 24 teams competed in the final stages to decide the champions of the 2026 Copa Sudamericana, with the final played at Estadio Metropolitano Roberto Meléndez in Barranquilla, Colombia.

== Qualified teams ==
The winners and runners-up of each of the eight groups in the Copa Sudamericana group stage as well as the third-placed teams of each of the eight groups in the Copa Libertadores group stage advanced to the final stages. The eight Copa Sudamericana group runners-up faced the eight Copa Libertadores group third-placed teams in the knockout round play-offs, whilst the eight Copa Sudamericana group winners directly advanced to the round of 16.

=== Copa Sudamericana group stage winners and runners-up ===
Group	Winners	Runners-up
A	(Ecuador) Macará	(Argentina) Tigre
B	(Brazil) Atlético Mineiro	(Peru) Cienciano
C	(Brazil) São Paulo	(Chile) O'Higgins
D	(Paraguay) Recoleta	(Brazil) Santos
E	(Brazil) Botafogo	(Venezuela) Caracas
F	(Uruguay) Montevideo City Torque	(Brazil) Grêmio
G	(Paraguay) Olimpia	(Brazil) Vasco da Gama
H	(Argentina) River Plate	(Brazil) Red Bull Bragantino

=== Copa Libertadores group stage third-placed teams ===
Group	Third-placed teams
A	(Colombia) Independiente Medellín
B	(Uruguay) Nacional
C	(Bolivia) Bolívar
D	(Argentina) Boca Juniors
E	(Colombia) Santa Fe
F	(Peru) Sporting Cristal
G	(Argentina) Lanús
H	(Venezuela) Universidad Central

=== Seeding ===
For the final stages, the teams were seeded according to their results in the group stage, with the Copa Sudamericana group winners seeded 1–8, the Copa Sudamericana group runners-up seeded 9–16, and the Copa Libertadores group third-placed teams seeded 17–24. For the round of 16 draw, the seeds 1–8 made up Pot 1, and the eight knockout round play-offs winners (seeds 9–24) made up Pot 2, keeping their seed number. Teams from the same association could play each other from the knockout round play-offs onwards.

Seed	Grp	Team	Pld	W	D	L	GF	GA	GD	Pts	Qualification
1	SE1	(Brazil) Botafogo	6	5	1	0	15	5	+10	16	Round of 16
2	SH1	(Argentina) River Plate	6	4	2	0	9	3	+6	14	Round of 16
3	SF1	(Uruguay) Montevideo City Torque	6	4	1	1	11	5	+6	13	Round of 16
4	SG1	(Paraguay) Olimpia	6	4	1	1	10	6	+4	13	Round of 16
5	SC1	(Brazil) São Paulo	6	3	3	0	6	1	+5	12	Round of 16
6	SA1	(Ecuador) Macará	6	2	4	0	6	3	+3	10	Round of 16
7	SB1	(Brazil) Atlético Mineiro	6	3	1	2	8	6	+2	10	Round of 16
8	SD1	(Paraguay) Recoleta	6	1	5	0	6	5	+1	8	Round of 16
9	SF2	(Brazil) Grêmio	6	3	2	1	8	3	+5	11	Play-off Match A
10	SH2	(Brazil) Red Bull Bragantino	6	3	1	2	12	5	+7	10	Play-off Match B
11	SG2	(Brazil) Vasco da Gama	6	3	1	2	9	6	+3	10	Play-off Match C
12	SC2	(Chile) O'Higgins	6	3	1	2	8	6	+2	10	Play-off Match D
13	SA2	(Argentina) Tigre	6	2	3	1	8	5	+3	9	Play-off Match E
14	SE2	(Venezuela) Caracas	6	2	3	1	9	9	0	9	Play-off Match F
15	SB2	(Peru) Cienciano	6	2	2	2	5	7	−2	8	Play-off Match G
16	SD2	(Brazil) Santos	6	1	4	1	8	6	+2	7	Play-off Match H
17	LH	(Venezuela) Universidad Central	6	3	0	3	7	11	−4	9	Play-off Match H
18	LG	(Argentina) Lanús	6	3	0	3	3	7	−4	9	Play-off Match G
19	LE	(Colombia) Santa Fe	6	2	2	2	6	7	−1	8	Play-off Match F
20	LB	(Uruguay) Nacional	6	2	2	2	7	9	−2	8	Play-off Match E
21	LD	(Argentina) Boca Juniors	6	2	1	3	6	5	+1	7	Play-off Match D
22	LA	(Colombia) Independiente Medellín	6	2	1	3	6	11	−5	7	Play-off Match C
23	LF	(Peru) Sporting Cristal	6	2	0	4	6	9	−3	6	Play-off Match B
24	LC	(Bolivia) Bolívar	6	1	2	3	6	8	−2	5	Play-off Match A

Source: CONMEBOL Sudamericana, CONMEBOL Libertadores
Rules for classification: 1) Higher position in group; 2) Points; 3) Goal difference; 4) Goals scored; 5) Red cards; 6) Yellow cards; 7) Drawing of lots (Regulations Article 2.4.3).

== Format ==
Starting from the knockout round play-offs, the teams played a single-elimination tournament with the following rules:

- In the knockout round play-offs, round of 16, quarter-finals and semi-finals, each tie was played on a home-and-away two-legged basis, with the higher-seeded team hosting the second leg (Regulations Article 2.2.3). If tied on aggregate, extra time was not played, and a penalty shoot-out was used to determine the winners (Regulations Article 2.4.4).
- The final was played as a single match at a venue pre-selected by CONMEBOL, with the higher-seeded team designated as the "home" team for administrative purposes (Regulations Article 2.2.6). If tied after regulation, 30 minutes of extra time would be played. If still tied after extra time, a penalty shoot-out would be used to determine the winners (Regulations Article 2.4.5).

== Draw ==
The draw for the round of 16 was held on 29 May 2026, 12:00 PYT (UTC−3) at the CONMEBOL headquarters in Luque, Paraguay. For the round of 16, the 16 teams were drawn into eight ties (A–H) between a Copa Sudamericana group winner (Pot 1) and a knockout round play-offs winner (Pot 2), with the group winners hosting the second leg. Teams from the same association or the same group could be drawn into the same tie (Regulations Articles 2.2.3.2).

== Bracket ==
The bracket starting from the round of 16 was determined as follows:

Round	Matchups
Knockout round play-offs	(Group runners-up host second leg, matchups pre-determined): Play-offs Match A: Seed 9 vs. Seed 24; Play-offs Match B: Seed 10 vs. Seed 23; Play-offs Match C: Seed 11 vs. Seed 22; Play-offs Match D: Seed 12 vs. Seed 21; Play-offs Match E: Seed 13 vs. Seed 20; Play-offs Match F: Seed 14 vs. Seed 19; Play-offs Match G: Seed 15 vs. Seed 18; Play-offs Match H: Seed 16 vs. Seed 17
Round of 16	(Group winners host second leg, matchups decided by draw): Match A; Match B; Match C; Match D; Match E; Match F; Match G; Match H
Quarter-finals	(Higher-seeded team host second leg): Match S1: Winner A vs. Winner H; Match S2: Winner B vs. Winner G; Match S3: Winner C vs. Winner F; Match S4: Winner D vs. Winner E
Semi-finals	(Higher-seeded team host second leg): Match F1: Winner S1 vs. Winner S4; Match F2: Winner S2 vs. Winner S3
Final	(Higher-seeded team designated as "home" team): Winner F1 vs. Winner F2

The bracket was decided based on the round of 16 draw, which was held on 29 May 2026.

Knockout round play-offs
17	(Venezuela) Universidad Central	1	2	3
16	(Brazil) Santos	4	4	8
23	(Peru) Sporting Cristal	0	0	0
10	(Brazil) Red Bull Bragantino	0	1	1
18	(Argentina) Lanús	2	0	2
15	(Peru) Cienciano	0	4	4
20	(Uruguay) Nacional	0	2	2
13	(Argentina) Tigre	3	1	4
21	(Argentina) Boca Juniors (p)	1	0	1 (4)
12	(Chile) O'Higgins	0	1	1 (3)
24	(Bolivia) Bolívar	3	1	4
9	(Brazil) Grêmio	2	0	2
19	(Colombia) Santa Fe	2	3	5
14	(Venezuela) Caracas	0	0	0
22	(Colombia) Independiente Medellín	2	0	2
11	(Brazil) Vasco da Gama	2	1	3

Round of 16
16	(Brazil) Santos	2	0	2
6	(Ecuador) Macará	1	0	1
10	(Brazil) Red Bull Bragantino	0	2	2
7	(Brazil) Atlético Mineiro	1	2	3
15	(Peru) Cienciano	6	0	6
1	(Brazil) Botafogo	1	1	2
13	(Argentina) Tigre	0	1	1
3	(Uruguay) Montevideo City Torque	1	2	3
21	(Argentina) Boca Juniors	3	4	7
8	(Paraguay) Recoleta	1	0	1
24	(Bolivia) Bolívar	1	1	2
5	(Brazil) São Paulo	1	3	4
19	(Colombia) Santa Fe (p)	0	1	1 (8)
2	(Argentina) River Plate	0	1	1 (7)
11	(Brazil) Vasco da Gama	0	4	4
4	(Paraguay) Olimpia	0	1	1

Quarter-finals
16	(Brazil) Santos	2	2	4 (1)
7	(Brazil) Atlético Mineiro (p)	0	4	4 (3)
15	(Peru) Cienciano	2	0	2
3	(Uruguay) Montevideo City Torque	0	3	3
21	(Argentina) Boca Juniors	1	1	2
5	(Brazil) São Paulo	0	1	1
19	(Colombia) Santa Fe	0	0	0
11	(Brazil) Vasco da Gama	0	2	2

Semi-finals
7	(Brazil) Atlético Mineiro	3	0	3
3	(Uruguay) Montevideo City Torque	0	2	2
21	(Argentina) Boca Juniors	0	3	3
11	(Brazil) Vasco da Gama	1	1	2

Final
21 November – Barranquilla
7	(Brazil) Atlético Mineiro	0
21	(Argentina) Boca Juniors	2

== Knockout round play-offs ==
=== Summary ===
The first legs were played on 21–23 July, and the second legs were played on 28–30 July 2026.

Team 1	Agg.	Team 2	1st leg	2nd leg
Bolívar (Bolivia)	4–2	(Brazil) Grêmio	3–2	1–0
Sporting Cristal (Peru)	0–1	(Brazil) Red Bull Bragantino	0–0	0–1
Independiente Medellín (Colombia)	2–3	(Brazil) Vasco da Gama	2–2	0–1
Boca Juniors (Argentina)	1–1 (4–3 p)	(Chile) O'Higgins	1–0	0–1
Nacional (Uruguay)	2–4	(Argentina) Tigre	0–3	2–1
Santa Fe (Colombia)	5–0	(Venezuela) Caracas	2–0	3–0
Lanús (Argentina)	2–4	(Peru) Cienciano	2–0	0–4
Universidad Central (Venezuela)	3–8	(Brazil) Santos	1–4	2–4

=== Matches ===
23 July 2026
18:00 UTC−4

Bolívar (Bolivia)	3–2	(Brazil) Grêmio
Cauteruccio 2'; Robson Matheus 18'; Asprilla 58'	Report	Villasanti 16'; Tetê 23'

Estadio Hernando Siles, La Paz
Referee: Roberto Pérez (Peru)
30 July 2026
19:00 UTC−3

Grêmio (Brazil)	0–1	(Bolivia) Bolívar
	Report	Asprilla 16'

Arena do Grêmio, Porto Alegre
Attendance: 25,010
Referee: Piero Maza (Chile)

Bolívar won 4–2 on aggregate and advanced to the round of 16.

22 July 2026
19:30 UTC−5

Sporting Cristal (Peru)	0–0	(Brazil) Red Bull Bragantino
	Report

Estadio Nacional, Lima (Note: Sporting Cristal played their home match at Estadio Nacional, Lima instead of their regular stadium Estadio Alberto Gallardo, Lima which did not meet CONMEBOL requirements.)
Referee: Leandro Rey Hilfer (Argentina)
29 July 2026
21:30 UTC−3

Red Bull Bragantino (Brazil)	1–0	(Peru) Sporting Cristal
Pedro Henrique 59'	Report

Estádio Cícero de Souza Marques, Bragança Paulista
Attendance: 2,192
Referee: Esteban Ostojich (Uruguay)

Red Bull Bragantino won 1–0 on aggregate and advanced to the round of 16.

22 July 2026
17:00 UTC−5

Independiente Medellín (Colombia)	2–2	(Brazil) Vasco da Gama
Montaño 45+4', 72'	Report	Varela 46' (o.g.); Spinelli 86'

Estadio Atanasio Girardot, Medellín
Attendance: 0 (Note: Independiente Medellín played their home match behind closed doors as they were punished for the incidents by their fans in their 2026 Copa Libertadores group stage match against Flamengo.)
Referee: Piero Maza (Chile)
29 July 2026
19:00 UTC−3

Vasco da Gama (Brazil)	1–0	(Colombia) Independiente Medellín
Thiago Mendes 85'	Report

Estádio São Januário, Rio de Janeiro
Attendance: 15,835
Referee: Maximiliano Ramírez (Argentina)

Vasco da Gama won 3–2 on aggregate and advanced to the round of 16.

23 July 2026
21:30 UTC−3

Boca Juniors (Argentina)	1–0	(Chile) O'Higgins
Merentiel 44'	Report

La Bombonera, Buenos Aires
Referee: Andrés Matonte (Uruguay)
30 July 2026
20:30 UTC−4

O'Higgins (Chile)	1–0	(Argentina) Boca Juniors
González 72'	Report
Penalties
González (penalty scored); Castillo (penalty scored); Vecino (penalty missed); Pavez (penalty missed); Brizuela (penalty scored)	3–4	(penalty scored) Paredes; (penalty scored) Merentiel; (penalty scored) Figal; (penalty missed) Aranda; (penalty scored) Blanco

Estadio El Teniente, Rancagua
Referee: Wilmar Roldán (Colombia)

Tied 1–1 on aggregate, Boca Juniors won on penalties and advanced to the round of 16.

21 July 2026
19:00 UTC−3

Nacional (Uruguay)	0–3	(Argentina) Tigre
	Report	Elías 2'; Russo 45+4'; Cabrera 90'

Estadio Gran Parque Central, Montevideo
Referee: Carlos Betancur (Colombia)
28 July 2026
19:00 UTC−3

Tigre (Argentina)	1–2	(Uruguay) Nacional
López 82'	Report	Gómez 11'; Silvera 31'

Estadio José Dellagiovanna, Victoria
Referee: Flavio de Souza (Brazil)

Tigre won 4–2 on aggregate and advanced to the round of 16.

23 July 2026
19:30 UTC−5

Santa Fe (Colombia)	2–0	(Venezuela) Caracas
Rodallega 30'; Fagúndez 84'	Report

Estadio El Campín, Bogotá
Referee: Guillermo Guerrero (Ecuador)
30 July 2026
20:30 UTC−4

Caracas (Venezuela)	0–3	(Colombia) Santa Fe
	Report	Bustos 56'; Figueroa 77' (o.g.); Fagúndez 83'

Estadio Metropolitano, Cabudare (Note: Caracas played their home match at Estadio Metropolitano, Cabudare instead of their regular stadium Estadio Olímpico de la UCV, Caracas due to the impact of the 2026 Venezuela earthquakes.)
Referee: Anderson Daronco (Brazil)

Santa Fe won 5–0 on aggregate and advanced to the round of 16.

22 July 2026
21:30 UTC−3

Lanús (Argentina)	2–0	(Peru) Cienciano
Watson 35'; Carrera 90+5'	Report

Estadio Ciudad de Lanús, Lanús
Referee: Alexis Herrera (Venezuela)
29 July 2026
19:30 UTC−5

Cienciano (Peru)	4–0	(Argentina) Lanús
Garcés 7', 45+1'; Hohberg 40', 90+5'	Report

Estadio Garcilaso, Cusco
Referee: Carlos Betancur (Colombia)

Cienciano won 4–2 on aggregate and advanced to the round of 16.

21 July 2026
20:30 UTC−4

Universidad Central (Venezuela)	1–4	(Brazil) Santos
Ruiz 87'	Report	Bontempo 35'; Menino 57'; Thaciano 67'; Rony 84'

Estadio Misael Delgado, Valencia (Note: Universidad Central played their home match at Estadio Misael Delgado, Valencia instead of their regular stadium Estadio Olímpico de la UCV, Caracas due to the impact of the 2026 Venezuela earthquakes.)
Referee: Gery Vargas (Bolivia)
28 July 2026
21:30 UTC−3

Santos (Brazil)	4–2	(Venezuela) Universidad Central
Miguelito 39'; Gabriel 56'; Menino 65'; Rony 90+5'	Report	Sosa 1'; Mottes 72'

Estádio Urbano Caldeira, Santos
Attendance: 6,864
Referee: Carlos Benítez (Paraguay)

Santos won 8–3 on aggregate and advanced to the round of 16.

== Round of 16 ==
=== Summary ===
The first legs were played on 11–13 and 19 August, and the second legs were played on 18–20 and 26 August 2026.

Team 1	Agg.	Team 2	1st leg	2nd leg
Boca Juniors (Argentina)	7–1	(Paraguay) Recoleta	3–1	4–0
Red Bull Bragantino (Brazil)	2–3	(Brazil) Atlético Mineiro	0–1	2–2
Cienciano (Peru)	6–2	(Brazil) Botafogo	6–1	0–1
Vasco da Gama (Brazil)	4–1	(Paraguay) Olimpia	0–0	4–1
Santa Fe (Colombia)	1–1 (8–7 p)	(Argentina) River Plate	0–0	1–1
Tigre (Argentina)	1–3	(Uruguay) Montevideo City Torque	0–1	1–2
Santos (Brazil)	2–1	(Ecuador) Macará	2–1	0–0
Bolívar (Bolivia)	2–4	(Brazil) São Paulo	1–1	1–3

=== Matches ===
11 August 2026
19:00 UTC−3

Boca Juniors (Argentina)	3–1	(Paraguay) Recoleta
Ascacíbar 49'; Delgado 51'; Flores 62'	Report	Ríos 5'

Estadio Tomás Adolfo Ducó, Buenos Aires (Note: Boca Juniors played their home match against Recoleta at Estadio Tomás Adolfo Ducó, Buenos Aires instead of their regular stadium La Bombonera, Buenos Aires due to refurbishment works on the field of play.)
Referee: Piero Maza (Chile)
18 August 2026
19:00 UTC−3

Recoleta (Paraguay)	0–4	(Argentina) Boca Juniors
	Report	Ascacíbar 30'; Villa 43'; Merentiel 52'; Velasco 77'

Estadio Defensores del Chaco, Asunción (Note: Recoleta played their home match at Estadio Defensores del Chaco, Asunción instead of their regular stadium Estadio Roque Battilana, Asunción which did not meet CONMEBOL requirements.)
Referee: Andrés Matonte (Uruguay)

Boca Juniors won 7–1 on aggregate and advanced to the quarter-finals (Match S1).

12 August 2026
19:00 UTC−3

Red Bull Bragantino (Brazil)	0–1	(Brazil) Atlético Mineiro
	Report	Cuello 73'

Estádio Cícero de Souza Marques, Bragança Paulista
Attendance: 3,879
Referee: Leandro Rey Hilfer (Argentina)
19 August 2026
19:00 UTC−3

Atlético Mineiro (Brazil)	2–2	(Brazil) Red Bull Bragantino
Maycon 52'; Cuello 90+3'	Report	Eric Ramires 45+8'; Eduardo Sasha 81'

Arena MRV, Belo Horizonte
Attendance: 30,026
Referee: Maximiliano Ramírez (Argentina)

Atlético Mineiro won 3–2 on aggregate and advanced to the quarter-finals (Match S2).

13 August 2026
19:30 UTC−5

Cienciano (Peru)	6–1	(Brazil) Botafogo
Succar 18', 30', 78'; Bandiera 20', 62'; Martinich 35'	Report	Matheus Martins 49'

Estadio Garcilaso, Cusco
Referee: Augusto Aragón (Ecuador)
20 August 2026
21:30 UTC−3

Botafogo (Brazil)	1–0	(Peru) Cienciano
Danilo Pereira 8'	Report

Estádio Olímpico Nilton Santos, Rio de Janeiro
Attendance: 22,408
Referee: Juan Gabriel Benítez (Paraguay)

Cienciano won 6–2 on aggregate and advanced to the quarter-finals (Match S3).

13 August 2026
19:00 UTC−3

Vasco da Gama (Brazil)	0–0	(Paraguay) Olimpia
	Report

Estádio São Januário, Rio de Janeiro
Attendance: 18,985
Referee: Darío Herrera (Argentina)
20 August 2026
19:00 UTC−3

Olimpia (Paraguay)	1–4	(Brazil) Vasco da Gama
Matus 15'	Report	Thiago Mendes 29'; David 36'; Adson 70'; Spinelli 84'

Estadio Defensores del Chaco, Asunción (Note: Olimpia played their home match at Estadio Defensores del Chaco, Asunción instead of their regular stadium Estadio Osvaldo Domínguez Dibb, Asunción which is being rebuilt.)
Referee: Esteban Ostojich (Uruguay)

Vasco da Gama won 4–1 on aggregate and advanced to the quarter-finals (Match S4).

19 August 2026 (Note: Both legs of the Santa Fe v River Plate series, originally scheduled for 12 and 19 August 2026, were postponed for one week due to the 2026 Colombia earthquake.)
19:30 UTC−5

Santa Fe (Colombia)	0–0	(Argentina) River Plate
	Report

Estadio El Campín, Bogotá
Referee: Jesús Valenzuela (Venezuela)
26 August 2026
21:30 UTC−3

River Plate (Argentina)	1–1	(Colombia) Santa Fe
Driussi 52'	Report	Fagúndez 80' (pen.)
Penalties
Almada (penalty scored); Correa (penalty scored); Otamendi (penalty scored); Freitas (penalty scored); Borré (penalty missed); Martínez Quarta (penalty missed); Vera (penalty scored); González (penalty missed); Acuña (penalty scored); Meza (penalty scored); S. Beltrán (penalty missed)	7–8	(penalty scored) Lovera; (penalty scored) D. Torres; (penalty missed) Olivera; (penalty scored) L. Palacios; (penalty scored) Fagúndez; (penalty missed) J. Torres; (penalty scored) Scarpeta; (penalty missed) Angulo; (penalty scored) H. Palacios; (penalty scored) Mafla; (penalty scored) Asprilla

Estadio Monumental, Buenos Aires
Referee: Esteban Ostojich (Uruguay)

Tied 1–1 on aggregate, Santa Fe won on penalties and advanced to the quarter-finals (Match S4).

12 August 2026
19:00 UTC−3

Tigre (Argentina)	0–1	(Uruguay) Montevideo City Torque
	Report	Pizzichillo 53'

Estadio José Dellagiovanna, Victoria
Referee: Ramon Abatti (Brazil)
19 August 2026
21:30 UTC−3

Montevideo City Torque (Uruguay)	2–1	(Argentina) Tigre
Rodríguez 39', 45+4' (pen.)	Report	Moreno 41'

Estadio Centenario, Montevideo (Note: Montevideo City Torque played their home matches at Estadio Centenario, Montevideo instead of their regular stadium Estadio Charrúa, Montevideo which did not meet CONMEBOL requirements.)
Referee: Guillermo Guerrero (Ecuador)

Montevideo City Torque won 3–1 on aggregate and advanced to the quarter-finals (Match S3).

13 August 2026
19:00 UTC−3

Santos (Brazil)	2–1	(Ecuador) Macará
Gabriel 44'; Willian Arão 76'	Report	Posse 5'

Estádio Urbano Caldeira, Santos
Attendance: 10,257
Referee: Kevin Ortega (Peru)
20 August 2026
17:00 UTC−5

Macará (Ecuador)	0–0	(Brazil) Santos
	Report

Estadio Bellavista, Ambato
Referee: Cristián Garay (Chile)

Santos won 2–1 on aggregate and advanced to the quarter-finals (Match S2).

11 August 2026
20:30 UTC−4

Bolívar (Bolivia)	1–1	(Brazil) São Paulo
Melgar 63'	Report	Arboleda 23'

Estadio Hernando Siles, La Paz
Referee: Wilmar Roldán (Colombia)
18 August 2026
21:30 UTC−3

São Paulo (Brazil)	3–1	(Bolivia) Bolívar
Luciano 18'; Calleri 68' (pen.); Sabino 76'	Report	Asprilla 61'

Estádio do Morumbi, São Paulo
Attendance: 42,087
Referee: Kevin Ortega (Peru)

São Paulo won 4–2 on aggregate and advanced to the quarter-finals (Match S1).

== Quarter-finals ==
=== Summary ===
The first legs were played on 8–10 September, and the second legs were played on 15–17 September 2026.

Team 1	Agg.	Team 2	1st leg	2nd leg
Boca Juniors (Argentina)	2–1	(Brazil) São Paulo	1–0	1–1
Santos (Brazil)	4–4 (1–3 p)	(Brazil) Atlético Mineiro	2–0	2–4
Cienciano (Peru)	2–3	(Uruguay) Montevideo City Torque	2–0	0–3
Santa Fe (Colombia)	0–2	(Brazil) Vasco da Gama	0–0	0–2

=== Matches ===
8 September 2026
21:30 UTC−3

Boca Juniors (Argentina)	1–0	(Brazil) São Paulo
Merentiel 52'	Report

La Bombonera, Buenos Aires
Referee: Piero Maza (Chile)
15 September 2026
21:30 UTC−3

São Paulo (Brazil)	1–1	(Argentina) Boca Juniors
Duarte 89'	Report	Lozano 60'

Estádio do Morumbi, São Paulo
Referee: Gustavo Tejera (Uruguay)

Boca Juniors won 2–1 on aggregate and advanced to the semi-finals (Match F1).

9 September 2026
19:00 UTC−3

Santos (Brazil)	2–0	(Brazil) Atlético Mineiro
Arão 31'; Oliva 68'	Report

Estádio Urbano Caldeira, Santos
Referee: Alexis Herrera (Venezuela)
16 September 2026
19:00 UTC−3

Atlético Mineiro (Brazil)	4–2	(Brazil) Santos
Bernard 1'; Reinier 20', 41'; Cuello 90+2'	Report	Lyanco 28' (o.g.); Gabriel 72'
Penalties
Scarpa (penalty scored); Igor Gomes (penalty scored); Fred (penalty missed); Borbas (penalty scored)	3–1	(penalty missed) Gabriel; (penalty missed) Schmidt; (penalty scored) Bontempo; (penalty missed) Arthur

Arena MRV, Belo Horizonte
Referee: Facundo Tello (Argentina)

Tied 4–4 on aggregate, Atlético Mineiro won on penalties and advanced to the semi-finals (Match F2).

10 September 2026
19:30 UTC−5

Cienciano (Peru)	2–0	(Uruguay) Montevideo City Torque
Souza 28'; Amondarain 42'	Report

Estadio Garcilaso, Cusco
Referee: Wilton Sampaio (Brazil)
17 September 2026
21:30 UTC−3

Montevideo City Torque (Uruguay)	3–0	(Peru) Cienciano
Rodríguez 38', 57'; Da Silva 90+2'	Report

Estadio Centenario, Montevideo
Referee: Maximiliano Ramírez (Argentina)

Montevideo City Torque won 3–2 on aggregate and advanced to the semi-finals (Match F2).

8 September 2026
17:00 UTC−5

Santa Fe (Colombia)	0–0	(Brazil) Vasco da Gama
	Report

Estadio El Campín, Bogotá
Referee: Darío Herrera (Argentina)
15 September 2026
19:00 UTC−3

Vasco da Gama (Brazil)	2–0	(Colombia) Santa Fe
Bruno Duarte 37'; David 65'	Report

Estádio São Januário, Rio de Janeiro
Referee: Alexis Herrera (Venezuela)

Vasco da Gama won 2–0 on aggregate and advanced to the semi-finals (Match F1).

== Semi-finals ==
=== Summary ===
The first legs were played on 13 and 14 October, and the second legs were played on 20 and 21 October 2026.

Team 1	Agg.	Team 2	1st leg	2nd leg
Boca Juniors (Argentina)	3–2	(Brazil) Vasco da Gama	0–1	3–1
Atlético Mineiro (Brazil)	3–2	(Uruguay) Montevideo City Torque	3–0	0–2

=== Matches ===
13 October 2026
21:30 UTC−3

Boca Juniors (Argentina)	0–1	(Brazil) Vasco da Gama
	Report	Adson 25'

La Bombonera, Buenos Aires
Referee: Piero Maza (Chile)
20 October 2026
21:30 UTC−3

Vasco da Gama (Brazil)	1–3	(Argentina) Boca Juniors
Rodríguez 66'	Report	Di Lollo 4'; Merentiel 34'; Paredes 88'

Estádio do Maracanã, Rio de Janeiro (Note: Vasco da Gama played their semi-finals home match at Estádio do Maracanã, Rio de Janeiro instead of their regular stadium Estádio São Januário, Rio de Janeiro which did not meet capacity requirements for this round.)
Referee: Jesús Valenzuela (Venezuela)

Boca Juniors won 3–2 on aggregate and advanced to the final.

14 October 2026
19:00 UTC−3

Atlético Mineiro (Brazil)	3–0	(Uruguay) Montevideo City Torque
Reinier 37'; Bernard 42'; Borbas 80'	Report

Arena MRV, Belo Horizonte
Referee: Carlos Betancur (Colombia)
21 October 2026
19:00 UTC−3

Montevideo City Torque (Uruguay)	2–0	(Brazil) Atlético Mineiro
Silva 89'; Kagelmacher 90+3'	Report

Estadio Centenario, Montevideo
Referee: Cristián Garay (Chile)

Atlético Mineiro won 3–2 on aggregate and advanced to the final.

== Final ==
The final was played on 21 November 2026 at Estadio Metropolitano Roberto Meléndez in Barranquilla, Colombia.

21 November 2026
17:30 UTC−5

Atlético Mineiro (Brazil)	0–2	(Argentina) Boca Juniors
	Report	Ascacíbar 16'; Merentiel 48'

Estadio Metropolitano Roberto Meléndez, Barranquilla
Referee: Andrés Matonte (Uruguay)
