= 2026 Torneo Apertura final =

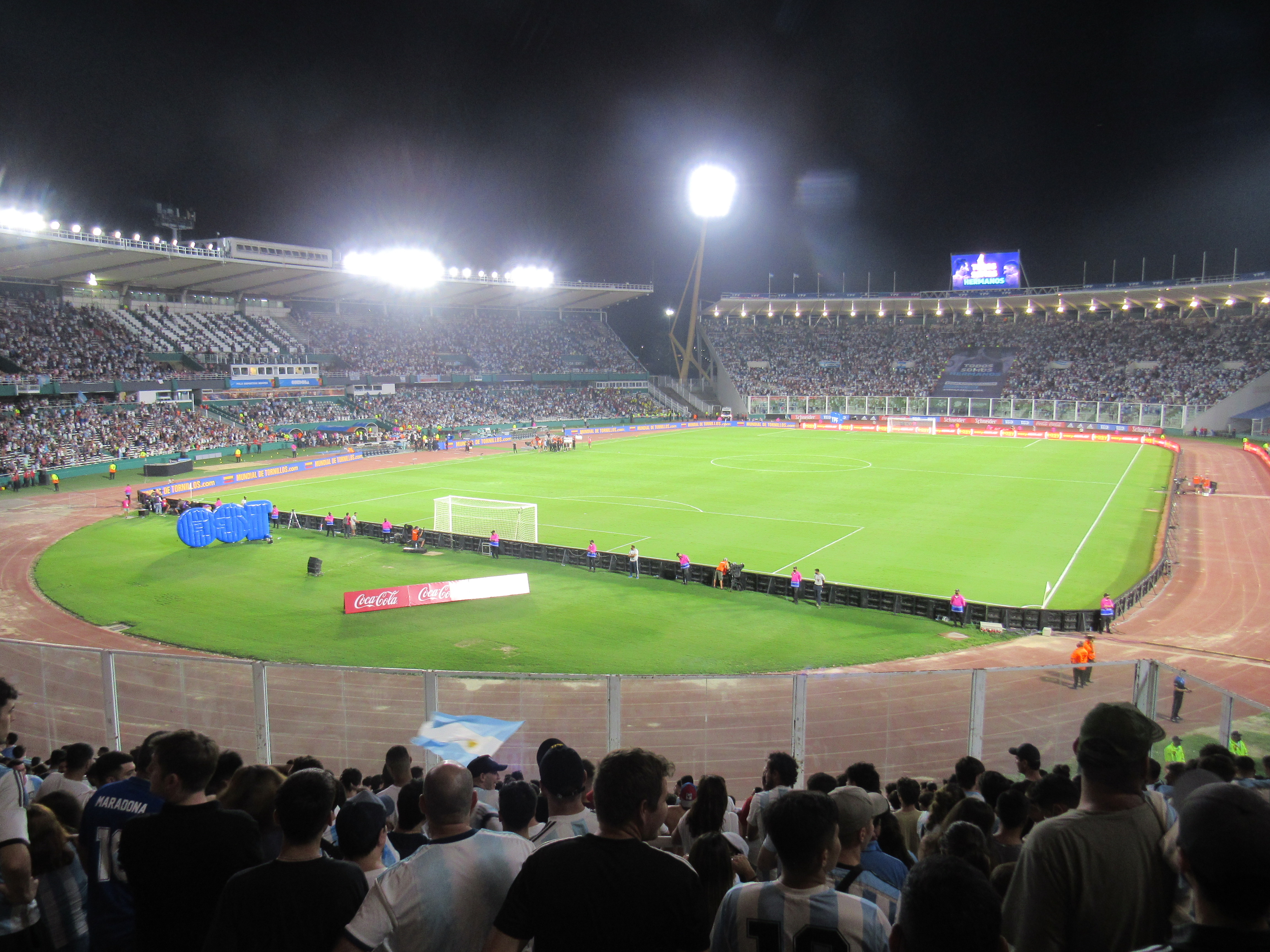
- Estadio Mario Alberto Kempes, venue
- Event: 2026 Torneo Apertura
River Plate	Belgrano
2	3
- Date: 24 May 2026
- Venue: Estadio Mario Alberto Kempes, Córdoba
- Referee: Yael Falcón Pérez
- Attendance: 57,000

The 2026 Torneo Apertura final was the last match of the 2026 Torneo Apertura of the 2026 Argentine Primera División. It was held at the Estadio Mario Alberto Kempes in Córdoba on 24 May 2026, between River Plate and Belgrano. It was River Plate's ninth Primera División final (they had won four of them), while Belgrano were making their debut as finalists in the top division of Argentine football.

Both teams had previously played in the thirteenth round of the Torneo Apertura group stage. On 5 April 2026, River Plate defeated Belgrano 3–0 in a match held at the Estadio Monumental in Buenos Aires, with goals from Galván (2) and Colidio securing the win.

The match also resembled the 2011 Argentine Primera División relegation playoffs, in which Belgrano defeated River Plate 3–1 on aggregate, earning promotion to the Primera División while River Plate were relegated to the second division for the first time in their history. Manager Ricardo Zielinski, assistant manager Juan Carlos Olave (former goalkeeper) and Franco Vázquez were all part of the 2011 Belgrano team and were present at the 2026 Torneo Apertura final.

Belgrano won their first title in the highest division after they defeated River Plate 3–2. As champions, Belgrano qualified for the 2027 Copa Libertadores and the 2026 Trofeo de Campeones.

== Qualified teams ==
Team	Previous finals app.
River Plate	**1932**, **1936**, 1969 Met, 1972 Nac, 1976 Nac, 1978 Nac, **1979 Met**, **1981 Nac**, 1984 Nac
Belgrano	(none)

- Bold: indicates winning years
- Met: Campeonato Metropolitano
- Nac: Campeonato Nacional

== Road to the final ==
Note: In all results below, the score of the finalist is given first (H: home; A: away; N: neutral venue).

River Plate		Round	Belgrano	
Opponent	Result	Group stage	Opponent	Result
Barracas Central	1–0 (A)	Matchday 1	Rosario Central	2–1 (A)
Gimnasia y Esgrima (LP)	2–0 (H)	Matchday 2	Tigre	1–1 (H)
Rosario Central	0–0 (A)	Matchday 3	Argentinos Juniors	0–0 (A)
Tigre	1–4 (H)	Matchday 4	Banfield	1–0 (H)
Argentinos Juniors	0–1 (A)	Matchday 5	Independiente Rivadavia	1–0 (A)
Vélez Sarsfield	0–1 (A)	Matchday 6	Defensa y Justicia	1–1 (A)
Banfield	3–1 (H)	Matchday 7	Atlético Tucumán	3–1 (H)
Independiente Rivadavia	1–1 (A)	Matchday 8	Huracán	1–3 (A)
Atlético Tucumán	0–1 (H)	Matchday 9	Sarmiento (J)	4–0 (H)
Huracán	2–1 (A)	Matchday 10	Estudiantes (RC)	1–0 (A)
Sarmiento (J)	2–0 (H)	Matchday 11	Talleres (C)	0–0 (H)
Estudiantes (RC)	2–0 (A)	Matchday 12	Racing	1–2 (H)
Belgrano	3–0 (H)	Matchday 13	River Plate	0–3 (A)
Racing	2–0 (A)	Matchday 14	Aldosivi	1–0 (H)
Boca Juniors	0–1 (H)	Matchday 15	Barracas Central	0–0 (A)
Aldosivi	3–1 (H)	Matchday 16	Gimnasia y Esgrima (LP)	0–1 (H)
**Zone B second place**: Pos / Team / Pld / W / D / L / GF / GA / GD / Pts; 1 / Independiente Rivadavia / 16 / 10 / 4 / 2 / 29 / 15 / +14 / **34**; **2** / River Plate / **16** / **9** / **2** / **5** / **22** / **12** / **+10** / **29**; 3 / Argentinos Juniors / 16 / 8 / 5 / 3 / 17 / 13 / +4 / **29**; 4 / Rosario Central / 16 / 8 / 4 / 4 / 20 / 16 / +4 / **28**; 5 / Belgrano / 16 / 7 / 5 / 4 / 17 / 13 / +4 / **26**; Source: AFA		Final standings	**Zone B fifth place**: Pos / Team / Pld / W / D / L / GF / GA / GD / Pts; 3 / Argentinos Juniors / 16 / 8 / 5 / 3 / 17 / 13 / +4 / **29**; 4 / Rosario Central / 16 / 8 / 4 / 4 / 20 / 16 / +4 / **28**; **5** / Belgrano / **16** / **7** / **5** / **4** / **17** / **13** / **+4** / **26**; 6 / Gimnasia y Esgrima (LP) / 16 / 8 / 2 / 6 / 19 / 19 / 0 / **26**; 7 / Huracán / 16 / 5 / 7 / 4 / 17 / 13 / +4 / **22**; Source: AFA	
River Plate		Round	Belgrano	
Opponent	Result	Final stages	Opponent	Result
San Lorenzo	2–2 (4–3 p) (H)	Round of 16	Talleres (C)	1–0 (A)
Gimnasia y Esgrima (LP)	2–0 (H)	Quarter-finals	Unión	2–0 (H)
Rosario Central	1–0 (H)	Semi-finals	Argentinos Juniors	1–1 (4–3 p) (A)

== Match details ==
Sebastián Driussi, Juan Portillo, Agustín Ruberto and Matías Viña (all from River Plate) and Lisandro López (from Belgrano) all missed the match due to injury.

24 May 2026
15:30

River Plate	2–3	Belgrano
Colidio 18'; Galván 59'	Report	Morales 26'; Fernández 85' (pen.), 88'

Estadio Mario Alberto Kempes, Córdoba
Attendance: 57,000
Referee: Yael Falcón Pérez

**River Plate**	**Belgrano**

GK	41	(Argentina) Santiago Beltrán
RB	16	(Argentina) Fabricio Bustos
CB	28	(Argentina) Lucas Martínez Quarta (c)
CB	13	(Argentina) Lautaro Rivero
LB	21	(Argentina) Marcos Acuña		(substituted off) 69'
DM	6	(Argentina) Aníbal Moreno	(yellow card) 2'	(substituted off) 90+1'
DM	15	(Argentina) Fausto Vera
RM	24	(Argentina) Juan Cruz Meza		(substituted off) 89'
LM	26	(Argentina) Tomás Galván		(substituted off) 90+1'
AM	11	(Argentina) Facundo Colidio
CF	35	(Argentina) Joaquín Freitas
Substitutes:
GK	1	(Argentina) Franco Armani	(yellow card) 80'
DF	20	(Argentina) Germán Pezzella		(substituted on) 69'
DF	29	(Argentina) Gonzalo Montiel
DF	31	(Argentina) Facundo González
MF	8	(Argentina) Maximiliano Meza
MF	10	(Colombia) Juan Fernando Quintero		(substituted on) 89'
MF	19	(Ecuador) Kendry Páez		(substituted on) 90+1'
MF	22	(Colombia) Kevin Castaño
MF	34	(Argentina) Giuliano Galoppo
MF	44	(Argentina) Lucas Silva
FW	7	(Argentina) Maximiliano Salas		(substituted on) 90+1'
FW	25	(Argentina) Lautaro Pereyra
Manager:
(Argentina) Eduardo Coudet			(red card) 90'

GK	25	(Uruguay) Thiago Cardozo
RB	45	(Argentina) Agustín Falcón
CB	14	(Argentina) Leonardo Morales
CB	2	(Argentina) Alexis Maldonado		(substituted off) 46'
LB	3	(Argentina) Adrián Spörle
CM	21	(Argentina) Adrián Sánchez	(yellow card) 73'
CM	5	(Argentina) Santiago Longo		(substituted off) 62'
RM	24	(Argentina) Emiliano Rigoni		(substituted off) 90+1'
AM	10	(Armenia) Lucas Zelarayán (c)
LM	53	(Argentina) Juan Velázquez		(substituted off) 62'
CF	9	(Argentina) Lucas Passerini	(yellow card) 48'	(substituted off) 75'
Substitutes:
GK	23	(Argentina) Manuel Vicentini
DF	13	(Argentina) Álvaro Ocampo		(substituted on) 46'
DF	16	(Uruguay) Federico Ricca		(substituted on) 90+1'
DF	26	(Paraguay) Alcides Benítez
MF	11	(Argentina) Francisco González Metilli
MF	20	(Argentina) Franco Vázquez	(yellow card) 90+3'	(substituted on) 62'
MF	30	(Argentina) Gonzalo Zelarayán
MF	32	(Argentina) Julián Mavilla
MF	51	(Argentina) Ramiro Hernandes		(substituted on) 62'
FW	22	(Argentina) Nicolás Fernández		(substituted on) 75'
FW	37	(Argentina) Lautaro Gutiérrez
FW	42	(Argentina) Jeremías Lucco
Manager:
(Argentina) Ricardo Zielinski

Man of the Match:
(Argentina) Nicolás Fernández (Belgrano)

Assistant referees:
Facundo Rodríguez
Maximiliano Del Yesso
Fourth official:
Luis Lobo Medina
Fifth official:
Pablo Gualtieri
Video assistant referee:
Leandro Rey Hilfer
Assistant video assistant referees:
Salomé di Iorio

**Match rules**

- 90 minutes
- 30 minutes of extra time if necessary
- Penalty shoot-out if scores still level
- Twelve named substitutes
- Maximum of five substitutions, with a sixth allowed in extra time

=== Statistics ===
Overall
	River Plate	Belgrano
Goals scored	2	3
Total shots	8	13
Shots on target	6	9
Ball possession	58%	42%
Corner kicks	6	4
Fouls committed	7	11
Offsides	2	3
Yellow cards	2	3
Red cards	1	0
