= 2026 Copa Sudamericana first stage =

The 2026 Copa Sudamericana first stage was played from 3 to 5 March 2026. A total of 32 teams competed in the first stage to decide 16 of the 32 places in the group stage of the 2026 Copa Sudamericana.

== Draw ==
The draw for the first stage was held on 18 December 2025, 12:00 PYT (UTC−3), at the CONMEBOL Convention Centre in Luque, Paraguay.

For the first stage, the 32 teams involved were divided into eight pots according to their national association. The 32 teams were drawn into 16 ties, with the four teams from each national association being drawn against a rival from the same association in two ties per association. The first team drawn in each tie hosted the match.

First stage draw
Bolivia	Chile	Colombia	Ecuador
(Bolivia) San Antonio Bulo Bulo; (Bolivia) Blooming; (Bolivia) Independiente Petrolero; (Bolivia) Guabirá	Universidad de Chile; (Chile) Audax Italiano; (Chile) Palestino; (Chile) Cobresal	(Colombia) Atlético Nacional; (Colombia) América de Cali; (Colombia) Atlético Bucaramanga; (Colombia) Millonarios	(Ecuador) Orense; (Ecuador) Libertad; (Ecuador) Macará; (Ecuador) Deportivo Cuenca
Paraguay	Peru	Uruguay	Venezuela
(Paraguay) Sportivo Trinidense; (Paraguay) Nacional; (Paraguay) Recoleta; (Paraguay) Olimpia	(Peru) Alianza Atlético; (Peru) Melgar; (Peru) Deportivo Garcilaso; (Peru) Cienciano	(Uruguay) Defensor Sporting; (Uruguay) Boston River; (Uruguay) Racing; (Uruguay) Montevideo City Torque	(Venezuela) Academia Puerto Cabello; (Venezuela) Monagas; (Venezuela) Caracas; (Venezuela) Metropolitanos

1. ^{†} The identity of the teams from Bolivia and Ecuador was not known at the time of the draw.

== Format ==
In the first stage, each tie was played on a single-leg basis, with the winner being decided in a penalty shoot-out in case of a draw after 90 minutes.

The 16 winners of the first stage advanced to the group stage to join the 12 teams directly qualified for that stage (six from Argentina and six from Brazil), and four teams transferred from the Copa Libertadores (the four teams eliminated in the third stage of qualifying).

== Matches ==
Matches were played on 3–5 March 2026.

Team 1	Score	Team 2
Independiente Petrolero (Bolivia)	0–0 (3–2 p)	(Bolivia) Guabirá
Blooming (Bolivia)	3–0	(Bolivia) San Antonio Bulo Bulo
Universidad de Chile	1–2	(Chile) Palestino
Cobresal (Chile)	1–1 (2–3 p)	(Chile) Audax Italiano
Atlético Nacional (Colombia)	1–3	(Colombia) Millonarios
América de Cali (Colombia)	2–1	(Colombia) Atlético Bucaramanga
Deportivo Cuenca (Ecuador)	3–0	(Ecuador) Libertad
Orense (Ecuador)	0–1	(Ecuador) Macará
Nacional (Paraguay)	1–1 (4–5 p)	(Paraguay) Recoleta
Sportivo Trinidense (Paraguay)	0–1	(Paraguay) Olimpia
Alianza Atlético (Peru)	2–0	(Peru) Deportivo Garcilaso
Cienciano (Peru)	1–1 (5–4 p)	(Peru) Melgar
Montevideo City Torque (Uruguay)	1–0	(Uruguay) Defensor Sporting
Boston River (Uruguay)	1–0	(Uruguay) Racing
Academia Puerto Cabello (Venezuela)	0–0 (5–3 p)	(Venezuela) Monagas
Caracas (Venezuela)	0–0 (4–3 p)	(Venezuela) Metropolitanos

3 March 2026
18:00 UTC−4

Independiente Petrolero (Bolivia)	0–0	(Bolivia) Guabirá
	Report
Penalties
J. Cristaldo (penalty scored); G. Cristaldo (penalty scored); Torres (penalty missed); Navarro (penalty scored)	3–2	(penalty missed) Rafinha; (penalty scored) Maciel; (penalty missed) Robles; (penalty scored) Ferrufino; (penalty missed) Peredo

Estadio Olímpico Patria, Sucre
Referee: Álex Cajas (Ecuador)

Independiente Petrolero advanced to the group stage (BOL 1).

4 March 2026
18:00 UTC−4

Blooming (Bolivia)	3–0	(Bolivia) San Antonio Bulo Bulo
Garcés 65'; Vásquez 83'; Hinojosa 86'	Report

Estadio Ramón Tahuichi Aguilera, Santa Cruz de la Sierra
Referee: Alexis Herrera (Venezuela)

Blooming advanced to the group stage (BOL 2).

4 March 2026
21:30 UTC−3

Universidad de Chile	1–2	(Chile) Palestino
Guerrero 90+4'	Report	Da Silva 85'; Garguez 90+6'

Estadio Nacional Julio Martínez Prádanos, Santiago
Attendance: 0 (Note: Universidad de Chile played their home match behind closed doors as punishment for the events of their 2025 Copa Sudamericana match against Independiente.)
Referee: Raphael Claus (Brazil)

Palestino advanced to the group stage (CHI 1).

3 March 2026
21:30 UTC−3 (Note: The kickoff of the Cobresal v Audax Italiano match was delayed until 23:10 local time due to a power outage at Estadio Zorros del Desierto.)

Cobresal (Chile)	1–1	(Chile) Audax Italiano
Pino 85'	Report	Matus 45+1'
Penalties
Pino (penalty scored); Frías (penalty missed); Yanis (penalty missed); Sandoval (penalty scored); Nadruz (penalty missed)	2–3	(penalty scored) Collao; (penalty scored) Rojas; (penalty scored) Coelho; (penalty missed) Chiaverano

Estadio Zorros del Desierto, Calama (Note: Cobresal played their home match at Estadio Zorros del Desierto, Calama instead of their regular stadium Estadio El Cobre, El Salvador which did not meet CONMEBOL requirements.)
Referee: Andrés Rojas (Colombia)

Audax Italiano advanced to the group stage (CHI 2).

4 March 2026
19:30 UTC−5

Atlético Nacional (Colombia)	1–3	(Colombia) Millonarios
Rodríguez 28'	Report	Contreras 21', 75'; L. Castro 42' (pen.)

Estadio Atanasio Girardot, Medellín
Referee: Wilton Sampaio (Brazil)

Millonarios advanced to the group stage (COL 1).

5 March 2026
19:30 UTC−5

América de Cali (Colombia)	2–1	(Colombia) Atlético Bucaramanga
Guzmán 45+3' (pen.); Palacios 55'	Report	Sambueza 23'

Estadio Pascual Guerrero, Cali
Referee: Facundo Tello (Argentina)

América de Cali advanced to the group stage (COL 2).

4 March 2026
21:00 UTC−5

Deportivo Cuenca (Ecuador)	3–0	(Ecuador) Libertad
Díaz 22'; Mosquera 67'; Leguizamón 90+4'	Report

Estadio Alejandro Serrano Aguilar, Cuenca (Note: The Deportivo Cuenca vs. Libertad match, originally scheduled to be held at Estadio George Capwell, Guayaquil, was moved to Deportivo Cuenca's regular stadium Estadio Alejandro Serrano Aguilar, Cuenca.)
Referee: Yael Falcón Pérez (Argentina)

Deportivo Cuenca advanced to the group stage (ECU 1).

5 March 2026
21:00 UTC−5

Orense (Ecuador)	0–1	(Ecuador) Macará
	Report	Blanc 68'

Estadio 9 de Mayo, Machala
Referee: José Cabero (Chile)

Macará advanced to the group stage (ECU 2).

5 March 2026
19:00 UTC−3

Nacional (Paraguay)	1–1	(Paraguay) Recoleta
Valdez 85'	Report	Parzajuk 45+4'
Penalties
Bailone (penalty scored); Prieto (penalty scored); Valdez (penalty missed); H. Benítez (penalty scored); Colmán (penalty scored); Gaona Lugo (penalty missed)	4–5	(penalty scored) Garay; (penalty scored) Báez; (penalty scored) Espínola; (penalty scored) Ferreira; (penalty missed) Franco; (penalty scored) Piris

Estadio Defensores del Chaco, Asunción (Note: Nacional played their home match at Estadio Defensores del Chaco, Asunción instead of their regular stadium Estadio Arsenio Erico, Asunción which did not meet CONMEBOL requirements.)
Referee: José Burgos (Uruguay)

Recoleta advanced to the group stage (PAR 1).

4 March 2026
21:30 UTC−3

Sportivo Trinidense (Paraguay)	0–1	(Paraguay) Olimpia
	Report	Lezcano 35'

Estadio Defensores del Chaco, Asunción (Note: Sportivo Trinidense played their home match at Estadio Defensores del Chaco, Asunción instead of their regular stadium Estadio Martín Torres, Asunción which did not meet CONMEBOL requirements.)
Referee: Piero Maza (Chile)

Olimpia advanced to the group stage (PAR 2).

3 March 2026
21:00 UTC−5

Alianza Atlético (Peru)	2–0	(Peru) Deportivo Garcilaso
Flores 22'; Coronel 90+8'	Report

Estadio Mansiche, Trujillo (Note: Alianza Atlético played their home match at Estadio Mansiche, Trujillo instead of their regular stadium Estadio Campeones del 36, Sullana which did not meet CONMEBOL requirements.)
Referee: Augusto Aragón (Ecuador)

Alianza Atlético advanced to the group stage (PER 1).

5 March 2026
19:30 UTC−5

Cienciano (Peru)	1–1	(Peru) Melgar
Becerra 51'	Report	Ramos 72'
Penalties
Hohberg (penalty scored); Succar (penalty scored); Robles (penalty scored); Souza (penalty scored); Amondarain (penalty scored)	5–4	(penalty scored) Vidales; (penalty scored) Zegarra; (penalty scored) De Santis; (penalty scored) Alcántar; (penalty missed) Cuesta

Estadio Garcilaso, Cusco
Referee: Flavio de Souza (Brazil)

Cienciano advanced to the group stage (PER 2).

3 March 2026
19:00 UTC−3

Montevideo City Torque (Uruguay)	1–0	(Uruguay) Defensor Sporting
Romero 47'	Report

Estadio Centenario, Montevideo (Note: Montevideo City Torque played their home match at Estadio Centenario, Montevideo (originally scheduled at Parque Alfredo Víctor Viera, Montevideo) instead of their regular stadium Estadio Charrúa, Montevideo which did not meet CONMEBOL requirements.)
Referee: Carlos Benítez (Paraguay)

Montevideo City Torque advanced to the group stage (URU 1).

5 March 2026
19:00 UTC−3

Boston River (Uruguay)	1–0	(Uruguay) Racing
Martínez 81'	Report

Estadio Centenario, Montevideo (Note: Boston River played their home match at Estadio Centenario, Montevideo instead of their regular stadium Estadio Campeones Olímpicos, Florida which did not meet CONMEBOL requirements.)
Referee: Juan Gabriel Benítez (Paraguay)

Boston River advanced to the group stage (URU 2).

3 March 2026
20:30 UTC−4

Academia Puerto Cabello (Venezuela)	0–0	(Venezuela) Monagas
	Report
Penalties
Pernía (penalty scored); Contreras (penalty scored); Hernández (penalty scored); Bamba (penalty scored); Castillo (penalty scored)	5–3	(penalty scored) Jaramillo; (penalty scored) Ossa; (penalty scored) Basante; (penalty missed) Peralta

Estadio Misael Delgado, Valencia (Note: Academia Puerto Cabello played their home match at Estadio Misael Delgado, Valencia instead of their regular stadium La Bombonerita, Puerto Cabello which did not meet CONMEBOL requirements.)
Referee: Gery Vargas (Bolivia)

Academia Puerto Cabello advanced to the group stage (VEN 1).

4 March 2026
18:00 UTC−4

Caracas (Venezuela)	0–0	(Venezuela) Metropolitanos
	Report
Penalties
Maestre (penalty scored); Márquez (penalty scored); Mago (penalty missed); Reinoso (penalty scored); La Mantía (penalty scored)	4–3	(penalty missed) Miku; (penalty missed) Ortiz; (penalty scored) Ramírez; (penalty scored) Ayine; (penalty scored) Garcés

Estadio Olímpico de la UCV, Caracas
Referee: Carlos Betancur (Colombia)

Caracas advanced to the group stage (VEN 2).
