= Jorge González (Paraguayan football manager) =

Paraguayan football manager (born 1975)

Personal information
- Full name: Jorge Osmar González Frutos
- Date of birth: 6 May 1975 (age 51)
- Place of birth: Asunción, Paraguay

Team information
- Current team: Recoleta FC (manager)

Managerial career
- Years: Team
- 2022–2024: Deportivo Recoleta (assistant)
- 2024–: Recoleta

Jorge Osmar González Frutos (born 6 May 1975) is a Paraguayan football manager, currently in charge of Recoleta.

== Career ==
Born in Asunción, González was a futsal player before becoming a manager in the category. In the end of 2021, he joined Deportivo Recoleta's football side, and worked as a sporting manager, an administrator, a sporting advisor and assistant manager at the club.

On 9 July 2024, González was named manager of Recoleta in the place of Víctor González. He led the club to a promotion to the Primera División as champions of the 2024 División Intermedia, remaining unbeaten in the process.

In November 2024, González was confirmed as manager of Recoleta for the upcoming season. He led the club to their first-ever continental competition, after qualifying to the 2026 Copa Sudamericana.

== Honours ==
Deportivo Recoleta

- División Intermedia: 2024
