= Lucas Silva (footballer, born 2007) =

Argentine footballer (born 2007)

- Silva in 2026

Personal information
- Full name: Lucas Gabriel Silva
- Date of birth: 26 February 2007 (age 19)
- Place of birth: La Dulce, Necochea, Buenos Aires
- Height: 1.73 m (5 ft 8 in)
- Position: Midfielder

Team information
- Current team: River Plate
- Number: 44

Youth career
- Deportivo La Dulce
- 2016–: River Plate

Senior career*
Years	Team	Apps	(Gls)
2026–	River Plate	5	(0)
- * Club domestic league appearances and goals

Lucas Gabriel Silva (born 26 February 2007) is an Argentine professional association football player who plays as a central midfielder or defensive midfielder for Argentine Primera División club River Plate.

== Career ==
=== Early career ===
Silva began playing as a striker for Deportivo La Dulce, a club in Necochea. He joined River Plate in 2016 when he was 9 years old, after being recruited by a scouting team that held a trial in that city.

=== River Plate ===
He made his professional debut in the final minute in the 3–1 victory against Club Atlético Aldosivi for the 2026 Torneo Apertura on April 25, 2026. His debut was the shortest in the club's history, as he entered with twelve seconds remaining.

He made his international cup debut in the 0–1 victory against Red Bull Bragantino, corresponding to the group stage of the 2026 Copa Sudamericana. In that match he provided the assist for the winning goal, scored by Lucas Martínez Quarta.

He scored his first goal in the 3–0 victory against Blooming for the group stage of the Copa Sudamericana.
