= 2026 Copa Sudamericana =

25th Copa Sudamericana edition

Copa CONMEBOL Sudamericana 2026
- The Estadio Metropolitano Roberto Meléndez in Barranquilla hosted the final

Tournament details
- Dates: 3 March – 21 November 2026
- Teams: 44+12 (from 10 associations)

Final positions
- Champions: (Argentina) Boca Juniors (3rd title)
- Runners-up: (Brazil) Atlético Mineiro

Tournament statistics
- Matches played: 157
- Goals scored: 362 (2.31 per match)
- Top scorer: (Uruguay) Salomón Rodríguez (7 goals)

The 2026 Copa CONMEBOL Sudamericana was the 25th edition of the CONMEBOL Sudamericana (also referred to as the Copa Sudamericana), South America's secondary club football tournament organized by CONMEBOL. The competition began on 3 March and ended on 21 November 2026, with the final played at Estadio Metropolitano Roberto Meléndez in Barranquilla, Colombia.

Argentine club Boca Juniors were the champions, winning their third Copa Sudamericana title after defeating Brazilian side Atlético Mineiro 2–0 in the final. By winning the tournament, Boca Juniors earned the right to play against the winners of the 2026 Copa Libertadores in the 2027 Recopa Sudamericana and they also automatically qualified for the 2027 Copa Libertadores group stage.

Argentine club Lanús were the titleholders, defending their title after placing third in their Copa Libertadores group, but they were eliminated by Cienciano in the knockout round play-offs.

== Teams ==
The following 44 teams from the 10 CONMEBOL associations qualified for the tournament:

- Argentina and Brazil: 6 berths each
- All other associations: 4 berths each

The entry stage was determined as follows:

- Group stage: 12 teams (teams from Argentina and Brazil)
- First stage: 32 teams (teams from all other associations)

Association	Team (Berth)	Entry stage	Qualification method
Argentina (6 berths)	River Plate (Argentina 1)	Group stage	2025 Liga Profesional aggregate table best team not qualified for 2026 Copa Libertadores
Argentina (6 berths)	Racing (Argentina 2)	Group stage	2025 Liga Profesional aggregate table 2nd best team not qualified for 2026 Copa Libertadores
Argentina (6 berths)	Deportivo Riestra (Argentina 3)	Group stage	2025 Liga Profesional aggregate table 3rd best team not qualified for 2026 Copa Libertadores
Argentina (6 berths)	San Lorenzo (Argentina 4)	Group stage	2025 Liga Profesional aggregate table 4th best team not qualified for 2026 Copa Libertadores
Argentina (6 berths)	Tigre (Argentina 5)	Group stage	2025 Liga Profesional aggregate table 5th best team not qualified for 2026 Copa Libertadores
Argentina (6 berths)	Barracas Central (Argentina 6)	Group stage	2025 Liga Profesional aggregate table 6th best team not qualified for 2026 Copa Libertadores
Bolivia (4 berths)	San Antonio Bulo Bulo (Bolivia 1)	First stage	2025 División Profesional best team not qualified for 2026 Copa Libertadores
Bolivia (4 berths)	Blooming (Bolivia 2)	First stage	2025 División Profesional 2nd best team not qualified for 2026 Copa Libertadores
Bolivia (4 berths)	Independiente Petrolero (Bolivia 3)	First stage	2025 División Profesional 3rd best team not qualified for 2026 Copa Libertadores
Bolivia (4 berths)	Guabirá (Bolivia 4)	First stage	2025 División Profesional 4th best team not qualified for 2026 Copa Libertadores
Brazil (6 berths)	São Paulo (Brazil 1)	Group stage	2025 Campeonato Brasileiro Série A best team not qualified for 2026 Copa Libertadores
Brazil (6 berths)	Grêmio (Brazil 2)	Group stage	2025 Campeonato Brasileiro Série A 2nd best team not qualified for 2026 Copa Libertadores
Brazil (6 berths)	Red Bull Bragantino (Brazil 3)	Group stage	2025 Campeonato Brasileiro Série A 3rd best team not qualified for 2026 Copa Libertadores
Brazil (6 berths)	Atlético Mineiro (Brazil 4)	Group stage	2025 Campeonato Brasileiro Série A 4th best team not qualified for 2026 Copa Libertadores
Brazil (6 berths)	Santos (Brazil 5)	Group stage	2025 Campeonato Brasileiro Série A 5th best team not qualified for 2026 Copa Libertadores
Brazil (6 berths)	Vasco da Gama (Brazil 6)	Group stage	2025 Campeonato Brasileiro Série A 6th best team not qualified for 2026 Copa Libertadores
Chile (4 berths)	Universidad de Chile (Chile 1)	First stage	2025 Liga de Primera best team not qualified for 2026 Copa Libertadores
Chile (4 berths)	Audax Italiano (Chile 2)	First stage	2025 Liga de Primera 2nd best team not qualified for 2026 Copa Libertadores
Chile (4 berths)	Palestino (Chile 3)	First stage	2025 Liga de Primera 3rd best team not qualified for 2026 Copa Libertadores
Chile (4 berths)	Cobresal (Chile 4)	First stage	2025 Liga de Primera 4th best team not qualified for 2026 Copa Libertadores
Colombia (4 berths)	Atlético Nacional (Colombia 1)	First stage	2025 Copa Colombia champions
Colombia (4 berths)	América de Cali (Colombia 2)	First stage	2025 Primera A aggregate table 2nd best team not qualified for 2026 Copa Libertadores
Colombia (4 berths)	Atlético Bucaramanga (Colombia 3)	First stage	2025 Primera A aggregate table 3rd best team not qualified for 2026 Copa Libertadores
Colombia (4 berths)	Millonarios (Colombia 4)	First stage	2025 Primera A aggregate table 4th best team not qualified for 2026 Copa Libertadores
Ecuador (4 berths)	Orense (Ecuador 1)	First stage	2025 Serie A best team not qualified for 2026 Copa Libertadores
Ecuador (4 berths)	Libertad (Ecuador 2)	First stage	2025 Serie A 2nd best team not qualified for 2026 Copa Libertadores
Ecuador (4 berths)	Macará (Ecuador 3)	First stage	2025 Serie A second hexagonal winners
Ecuador (4 berths)	Deportivo Cuenca (Ecuador 4)	First stage	2025 Serie A second hexagonal runners-up
Paraguay (4 berths)	Sportivo Trinidense (Paraguay 1)	First stage	2025 Copa de Primera aggregate table best team not qualified for 2026 Copa Libertadores
Paraguay (4 berths)	Nacional (Paraguay 2)	First stage	2025 Copa de Primera aggregate table 2nd best team not qualified for 2026 Copa Libertadores
Paraguay (4 berths)	Recoleta (Paraguay 3)	First stage	2025 Copa de Primera aggregate table 3rd best team not qualified for 2026 Copa Libertadores
Paraguay (4 berths)	Olimpia (Paraguay 4)	First stage	2025 Copa de Primera aggregate table 4th best team not qualified for 2026 Copa Libertadores
Peru (4 berths)	Alianza Atlético (Peru 1)	First stage	2025 Liga 1 aggregate table best team not qualified for 2026 Copa Libertadores
Peru (4 berths)	Melgar (Peru 2)	First stage	2025 Liga 1 aggregate table 2nd best team not qualified for 2026 Copa Libertadores
Peru (4 berths)	Deportivo Garcilaso (Peru 3)	First stage	2025 Liga 1 aggregate table 3rd best team not qualified for 2026 Copa Libertadores
Peru (4 berths)	Cienciano (Peru 4)	First stage	2025 Liga 1 aggregate table 4th best team not qualified for 2026 Copa Libertadores
Uruguay (4 berths)	Defensor Sporting (Uruguay 1)	First stage	2025 Liga AUF Uruguaya aggregate table best team not qualified for 2026 Copa Libertadores
Uruguay (4 berths)	Boston River (Uruguay 2)	First stage	2025 Liga AUF Uruguaya aggregate table 2nd best team not qualified for 2026 Copa Libertadores
Uruguay (4 berths)	Racing (Uruguay 3)	First stage	2025 Liga AUF Uruguaya aggregate table 3rd best team not qualified for 2026 Copa Libertadores
Uruguay (4 berths)	Montevideo City Torque (Uruguay 4)	First stage	2025 Liga AUF Uruguaya aggregate table 4th best team not qualified for 2026 Copa Libertadores
Venezuela (4 berths)	Academia Puerto Cabello (Venezuela 1)	First stage	2025 Clausura runners-up
Venezuela (4 berths)	Monagas (Venezuela 2)	First stage	2025 Liga FUTVE aggregate table 2nd best team not qualified for 2026 Copa Libertadores
Venezuela (4 berths)	Caracas (Venezuela 3)	First stage	2025 Liga FUTVE aggregate table 3rd best team not qualified for 2026 Copa Libertadores
Venezuela (4 berths)	Metropolitanos (Venezuela 4)	First stage	2025 Liga FUTVE aggregate table 4th best team not qualified for 2026 Copa Libertadores

A further 12 teams eliminated from the 2026 Copa Libertadores were transferred to the Copa Sudamericana, entering the group stage and the knockout round play-offs.

Teams eliminated in third stage	Entry stage
(Uruguay) Juventud	Group stage
(Chile) O'Higgins	Group stage
(Venezuela) Carabobo	Group stage
(Brazil) Botafogo	Group stage
Third-placed teams in group stage	Entry stage
(Colombia) Independiente Medellín	Knockout round play-offs
(Uruguay) Nacional	Knockout round play-offs
(Bolivia) Bolívar	Knockout round play-offs
(Argentina) Boca Juniors	Knockout round play-offs
(Colombia) Santa Fe	Knockout round play-offs
(Peru) Sporting Cristal	Knockout round play-offs
(Argentina) Lanús	Knockout round play-offs
(Venezuela) Universidad Central	Knockout round play-offs

== Schedule ==
The schedule of the competition is as follows:

Schedule for 2026 Copa Sudamericana
Stage	Draw date	First leg	Second leg
First stage	18 December 2025	3–5 March 2026	
Group stage	19 March 2026	Matchday 1: 7–9 April 2026; Matchday 2: 14–16 April 2026; Matchday 3: 28–30 April 2026; Matchday 4: 5–7 May 2026; Matchday 5: 19–21 May 2026; Matchday 6: 26–28 May 2026	
Knockout round play-offs	No draw	21–23 July 2026	28–30 July 2026
Round of 16	29 May 2026	11–13 August 2026	18–20 August 2026
Quarter-finals	29 May 2026	8–10 September 2026	15–17 September 2026
Semi-finals	29 May 2026	13–14 October 2026	20–21 October 2026
Final	29 May 2026	21 November 2026 at Estadio Metropolitano Roberto Meléndez, Barranquilla	

== Draws ==
Location of teams of the 2026 Copa Sudamericana.
Brown: Group A; Red: Group B; Orange: Group C;
Yellow: Group D; Green: Group E; Blue: Group F;
Purple: Group G; Pink: Group H; White: First stage;
Turquoise: Knockout round play-offs entrants.
(L) Teams transferred from the 2026 Copa Libertadores.

The draw for the first stage was held on 18 December 2025, 12:00 PYT (UTC−3), at the CONMEBOL Convention Centre in Luque, Paraguay.

For the first stage, the 32 teams involved were divided into eight pots according to their national association. The 32 teams were drawn into 16 ties, with the four teams from each national association being drawn against a rival from the same association in two ties per association. The first team drawn in each tie hosted the match. The draw for the group stage was held on 19 March 2026, 20:00 PYT (UTC−3), at the CONMEBOL Convention Centre in Luque, Paraguay.

Teams were seeded by their CONMEBOL Clubs ranking as of 15 December 2025 (shown in parentheses), taking into account the following three factors:

1. Performance in the last 10 years, taking into account Copa Libertadores and Copa Sudamericana results in the period 2016–2025.
2. Historical coefficient, taking into account Copa Libertadores and Copa Sudamericana results in the period 1960–2015 and 2002–2015 respectively.
3. Local tournament champion, with bonus points awarded to domestic league champions of the last 10 years.

For the group stage, the 32 teams were drawn into eight groups (Groups A–H) of four containing a team from each of the four pots. The four losers of the Copa Libertadores third stage were seeded into Pot 4. Teams from the same association could not be drawn into the same group.

Group stage draw
Pot 1	Pot 2	Pot 3	Pot 4
(Argentina) River Plate (3); (Brazil) Atlético Mineiro (6); (Brazil) São Paulo (7); (Argentina) Racing (9); (Brazil) Grêmio (14); (Paraguay) Olimpia (15); (Brazil) Santos (27); (Colombia) América de Cali (36)	(Argentina) San Lorenzo (37); (Brazil) Red Bull Bragantino (43); (Chile) Palestino (52); (Colombia) Millonarios (54); (Venezuela) Caracas (56); (Brazil) Vasco da Gama (61); (Peru) Cienciano (76); (Argentina) Tigre (97)	(Chile) Audax Italiano (100); (Bolivia) Blooming (110); (Venezuela) Academia Puerto Cabello (116); (Uruguay) Boston River (123); (Uruguay) Montevideo City Torque (135); (Ecuador) Deportivo Cuenca (137); (Bolivia) Independiente Petrolero (159); (Ecuador) Macará (211)	(Peru) Alianza Atlético (283); (Argentina) Barracas Central (No rank); (Argentina) Deportivo Riestra (No rank); (Paraguay) Recoleta (No rank); (Uruguay) Juventud (287); (Chile) O'Higgins (166); (Venezuela) Carabobo (128); (Brazil) Botafogo (19)

Notes

1. ^{CLQ3} The Copa Libertadores third stage losers were seeded in Pot 4.

The draw for the round of 16 was held on 29 May 2026, 12:00 PYT (UTC−3) at the CONMEBOL headquarters in Luque, Paraguay. For the round of 16, the 16 teams were drawn into eight ties (A–H) between a Copa Sudamericana group winner (Pot 1) and a knockout round play-offs winner (Pot 2), with the group winners hosting the second leg. Teams from the same association or the same group could be drawn into the same tie (Regulations Articles 2.2.3.2).

== First stage ==
In the first stage, each tie was played on a single-leg basis, with the winner being decided in a penalty shoot-out in case of a draw after 90 minutes.

The 16 winners of the first stage advanced to the group stage to join the 12 teams directly qualified for that stage (six from Argentina and six from Brazil), and four teams transferred from the Copa Libertadores (the four teams eliminated in the third stage of qualifying).

Team 1	Score	Team 2
Independiente Petrolero (Bolivia)	0–0 (3–2 p)	(Bolivia) Guabirá
Blooming (Bolivia)	3–0	(Bolivia) San Antonio Bulo Bulo
Universidad de Chile	1–2	(Chile) Palestino
Cobresal (Chile)	1–1 (2–3 p)	(Chile) Audax Italiano
Atlético Nacional (Colombia)	1–3	(Colombia) Millonarios
América de Cali (Colombia)	2–1	(Colombia) Atlético Bucaramanga
Deportivo Cuenca (Ecuador)	3–0	(Ecuador) Libertad
Orense (Ecuador)	0–1	(Ecuador) Macará
Nacional (Paraguay)	1–1 (4–5 p)	(Paraguay) Recoleta
Sportivo Trinidense (Paraguay)	0–1	(Paraguay) Olimpia
Alianza Atlético (Peru)	2–0	(Peru) Deportivo Garcilaso
Cienciano (Peru)	1–1 (5–4 p)	(Peru) Melgar
Montevideo City Torque (Uruguay)	1–0	(Uruguay) Defensor Sporting
Boston River (Uruguay)	1–0	(Uruguay) Racing
Academia Puerto Cabello (Venezuela)	0–0 (5–3 p)	(Venezuela) Monagas
Caracas (Venezuela)	0–0 (4–3 p)	(Venezuela) Metropolitanos

== Group stage ==
In the group stage, each group was played on a home-and-away round-robin basis. The winners of each group advanced to the round of 16 of the final stages, whilst the runners-up of each group advanced to the knockout round play-offs of the final stages.

=== Group A ===
Pos	Team	Pld	W	D	L	GF	GA	GD	Pts	Qualification	MAC	TIG	AME	AAS
1	(Ecuador) Macará	6	2	4	0	6	3	+3	10	Round of 16	—	2–2	1–1	0–0
2	(Argentina) Tigre	6	2	3	1	8	5	+3	9 (Note: Head-to-head points: Tigre 4, América de Cali 1.)	Knockout round play-offs	0–1	—	2–0	2–0
3	(Colombia) América de Cali	6	2	3	1	6	5	+1	9		0–0	1–1	—	2–1
4	(Peru) Alianza Atlético	6	0	2	4	2	9	−7	2		0–2	1–1	0–2	—

Source: CONMEBOL

=== Group B ===
Pos	Team	Pld	W	D	L	GF	GA	GD	Pts	Qualification	CAM	CIE	JUV	APC
1	(Brazil) Atlético Mineiro	6	3	1	2	8	6	+2	10	Round of 16	—	2–0	2–1	1–0
2	(Peru) Cienciano	6	2	2	2	5	7	−2	8	Knockout round play-offs	1–0	—	1–1	2–0
3	(Uruguay) Juventud	6	1	4	1	10	7	+3	7 (Note: Head-to-head points: Juventud 4, Academia Puerto Cabello 1.)		2–2	1–1	—	4–0
4	(Venezuela) Academia Puerto Cabello	6	2	1	3	6	9	−3	7		2–1	3–0	1–1	—

Source: CONMEBOL

=== Group C ===
Pos	Team	Pld	W	D	L	GF	GA	GD	Pts	Qualification	SPA	OHI	MIL	BOR
1	(Brazil) São Paulo	6	3	3	0	6	1	+5	12	Round of 16	—	2–0	1–1	2–0
2	(Chile) O'Higgins	6	3	1	2	8	6	+2	10	Knockout round play-offs	0–0	—	2–0	2–0
3	(Colombia) Millonarios	6	2	2	2	7	7	0	8		0–0	1–2	—	1–0
4	(Uruguay) Boston River	6	1	0	5	5	12	−7	3		0–1	3–2	2–4	—

Source: CONMEBOL

=== Group D ===
Pos	Team	Pld	W	D	L	GF	GA	GD	Pts	Qualification	REC	SAN	SLO	CUE
1	(Paraguay) Recoleta	6	1	5	0	6	5	+1	8	Round of 16	—	1–1	1–1	0–0
2	(Brazil) Santos	6	1	4	1	8	6	+2	7	Knockout round play-offs	1–1	—	2–2	3–0
3	(Argentina) San Lorenzo	6	1	4	1	6	5	+1	7		0–1	1–1	—	2–0
4	(Ecuador) Deportivo Cuenca	6	1	3	2	3	7	−4	6		2–2	1–0	0–0	—

Source: CONMEBOL

=== Group E ===
Pos	Team	Pld	W	D	L	GF	GA	GD	Pts	Qualification	BOT	CAR	RAC	IPE
1	(Brazil) Botafogo	6	5	1	0	15	5	+10	16	Round of 16	—	1–1	2–1	3–0
2	(Venezuela) Caracas	6	2	3	1	9	9	0	9	Knockout round play-offs	1–3	—	1–1	1–0
3	(Argentina) Racing	6	2	2	2	11	9	+2	8		2–3	2–2	—	2–0
4	(Bolivia) Independiente Petrolero	6	0	0	6	3	15	−12	0		0–3	2–3	1–3	—

Source: CONMEBOL

=== Group F ===
Pos	Team	Pld	W	D	L	GF	GA	GD	Pts	Qualification	MCT	GRE	DRI	PAL
1	(Uruguay) Montevideo City Torque	6	4	1	1	11	5	+6	13	Round of 16	—	1–0	4–1	1–0
2	(Brazil) Grêmio	6	3	2	1	8	3	+5	11	Knockout round play-offs	2–2	—	1–0	2–0
3	(Argentina) Deportivo Riestra	6	1	2	3	4	10	−6	5		2–1	0–3	—	0–0
4	(Chile) Palestino	6	0	3	3	1	6	−5	3		0–2	0–0	1–1	—

Source: CONMEBOL

=== Group G ===
Pos	Team	Pld	W	D	L	GF	GA	GD	Pts	Qualification	OLI	VAS	AUD	BAR
1	(Paraguay) Olimpia	6	4	1	1	10	6	+4	13	Round of 16	—	3–1	3–1	0–0
2	(Brazil) Vasco da Gama	6	3	1	2	10	6	+4	10	Knockout round play-offs	3–0	—	1–2	3–0
3	(Chile) Audax Italiano	6	2	1	3	7	9	−2	7		0–2	1–2	—	2–0
4	(Argentina) Barracas Central	6	0	3	3	2	8	−6	3		1–2	0–0	1–1	—

Source: CONMEBOL

=== Group H ===
Pos	Team	Pld	W	D	L	GF	GA	GD	Pts	Qualification	RIV	RBB	CBO	BLO
1	(Argentina) River Plate	6	4	2	0	9	3	+6	14	Round of 16	—	1–1	1–0	3–0
2	(Brazil) Red Bull Bragantino	6	3	1	2	12	5	+7	10	Knockout round play-offs	0–1	—	2–0	3–2
3	(Venezuela) Carabobo	6	3	0	3	6	5	+1	9		1–2	1–0	—	2–0
4	(Bolivia) Blooming	6	0	1	5	3	17	−14	1		1–1	0–6	0–2	—

Source: CONMEBOL

== Final stages ==
Starting from the knockout round play-offs, the teams played a single-elimination tournament with the following rules:

- In the knockout round play-offs, round of 16, quarter-finals and semi-finals, each tie was played on a home-and-away two-legged basis, with the higher-seeded team hosting the second leg (Regulations Article 2.2.3). If tied on aggregate, extra time was not played, and a penalty shoot-out was used to determine the winners (Regulations Article 2.4.4).
- The final was played as a single match at a venue pre-selected by CONMEBOL, with the higher-seeded team designated as the "home" team for administrative purposes (Regulations Article 2.2.6). If tied after regulation, 30 minutes of extra time would be played. If still tied after extra time, a penalty shoot-out would be used to determine the winners (Regulations Article 2.4.5).

=== Seeding ===
For the final stages, the teams were seeded according to their results in the group stage, with the Copa Sudamericana group winners seeded 1–8, the Copa Sudamericana group runners-up seeded 9–16, and the Copa Libertadores group third-placed teams seeded 17–24. For the round of 16 draw, the seeds 1–8 made up Pot 1, and the eight knockout round play-offs winners (seeds 9–24) made up Pot 2, keeping their seed number. Teams from the same association could play each other from the knockout round play-offs onwards.

Seed	Grp	Team	Pld	W	D	L	GF	GA	GD	Pts	Qualification
1	SE1	(Brazil) Botafogo	6	5	1	0	15	5	+10	16	Round of 16
2	SH1	(Argentina) River Plate	6	4	2	0	9	3	+6	14	Round of 16
3	SF1	(Uruguay) Montevideo City Torque	6	4	1	1	11	5	+6	13	Round of 16
4	SG1	(Paraguay) Olimpia	6	4	1	1	10	6	+4	13	Round of 16
5	SC1	(Brazil) São Paulo	6	3	3	0	6	1	+5	12	Round of 16
6	SA1	(Ecuador) Macará	6	2	4	0	6	3	+3	10	Round of 16
7	SB1	(Brazil) Atlético Mineiro	6	3	1	2	8	6	+2	10	Round of 16
8	SD1	(Paraguay) Recoleta	6	1	5	0	6	5	+1	8	Round of 16
9	SF2	(Brazil) Grêmio	6	3	2	1	8	3	+5	11	Play-off Match A
10	SH2	(Brazil) Red Bull Bragantino	6	3	1	2	12	5	+7	10	Play-off Match B
11	SG2	(Brazil) Vasco da Gama	6	3	1	2	9	6	+3	10	Play-off Match C
12	SC2	(Chile) O'Higgins	6	3	1	2	8	6	+2	10	Play-off Match D
13	SA2	(Argentina) Tigre	6	2	3	1	8	5	+3	9	Play-off Match E
14	SE2	(Venezuela) Caracas	6	2	3	1	9	9	0	9	Play-off Match F
15	SB2	(Peru) Cienciano	6	2	2	2	5	7	−2	8	Play-off Match G
16	SD2	(Brazil) Santos	6	1	4	1	8	6	+2	7	Play-off Match H
17	LH	(Venezuela) Universidad Central	6	3	0	3	7	11	−4	9	Play-off Match H
18	LG	(Argentina) Lanús	6	3	0	3	3	7	−4	9	Play-off Match G
19	LE	(Colombia) Santa Fe	6	2	2	2	6	7	−1	8	Play-off Match F
20	LB	(Uruguay) Nacional	6	2	2	2	7	9	−2	8	Play-off Match E
21	LD	(Argentina) Boca Juniors	6	2	1	3	6	5	+1	7	Play-off Match D
22	LA	(Colombia) Independiente Medellín	6	2	1	3	6	11	−5	7	Play-off Match C
23	LF	(Peru) Sporting Cristal	6	2	0	4	6	9	−3	6	Play-off Match B
24	LC	(Bolivia) Bolívar	6	1	2	3	6	8	−2	5	Play-off Match A

Source: CONMEBOL Sudamericana, CONMEBOL Libertadores
Rules for classification: 1) Higher position in group; 2) Points; 3) Goal difference; 4) Goals scored; 5) Red cards; 6) Yellow cards; 7) Drawing of lots (Regulations Article 2.4.3).

=== Bracket ===
The bracket was decided based on the round of 16 draw, which was held on 29 May 2026.

Knockout round play-offs
17	(Venezuela) Universidad Central	1	2	3
16	(Brazil) Santos	4	4	8
23	(Peru) Sporting Cristal	0	0	0
10	(Brazil) Red Bull Bragantino	0	1	1
18	(Argentina) Lanús	2	0	2
15	(Peru) Cienciano	0	4	4
20	(Uruguay) Nacional	0	2	2
13	(Argentina) Tigre	3	1	4
21	(Argentina) Boca Juniors (p)	1	0	1 (4)
12	(Chile) O'Higgins	0	1	1 (3)
24	(Bolivia) Bolívar	3	1	4
9	(Brazil) Grêmio	2	0	2
19	(Colombia) Santa Fe	2	3	5
14	(Venezuela) Caracas	0	0	0
22	(Colombia) Independiente Medellín	2	0	2
11	(Brazil) Vasco da Gama	2	1	3

Round of 16
16	(Brazil) Santos	2	0	2
6	(Ecuador) Macará	1	0	1
10	(Brazil) Red Bull Bragantino	0	2	2
7	(Brazil) Atlético Mineiro	1	2	3
15	(Peru) Cienciano	6	0	6
1	(Brazil) Botafogo	1	1	2
13	(Argentina) Tigre	0	1	1
3	(Uruguay) Montevideo City Torque	1	2	3
21	(Argentina) Boca Juniors	3	4	7
8	(Paraguay) Recoleta	1	0	1
24	(Bolivia) Bolívar	1	1	2
5	(Brazil) São Paulo	1	3	4
19	(Colombia) Santa Fe (p)	0	1	1 (8)
2	(Argentina) River Plate	0	1	1 (7)
11	(Brazil) Vasco da Gama	0	4	4
4	(Paraguay) Olimpia	0	1	1

Quarter-finals
16	(Brazil) Santos	2	2	4 (1)
7	(Brazil) Atlético Mineiro (p)	0	4	4 (3)
15	(Peru) Cienciano	2	0	2
3	(Uruguay) Montevideo City Torque	0	3	3
21	(Argentina) Boca Juniors	1	1	2
5	(Brazil) São Paulo	0	1	1
19	(Colombia) Santa Fe	0	0	0
11	(Brazil) Vasco da Gama	0	2	2

Semi-finals
7	(Brazil) Atlético Mineiro	3	0	3
3	(Uruguay) Montevideo City Torque	0	2	2
21	(Argentina) Boca Juniors	0	3	3
11	(Brazil) Vasco da Gama	1	1	2

Final
21 November – Barranquilla
7	(Brazil) Atlético Mineiro	0
21	(Argentina) Boca Juniors	2

=== Knockout round play-offs ===
Team 1	Agg.	Team 2	1st leg	2nd leg
Bolívar (Bolivia)	4–2	(Brazil) Grêmio	3–2	1–0
Sporting Cristal (Peru)	0–1	(Brazil) Red Bull Bragantino	0–0	0–1
Independiente Medellín (Colombia)	2–3	(Brazil) Vasco da Gama	2–2	0–1
Boca Juniors (Argentina)	1–1 (4–3 p)	(Chile) O'Higgins	1–0	0–1
Nacional (Uruguay)	2–4	(Argentina) Tigre	0–3	2–1
Santa Fe (Colombia)	5–0	(Venezuela) Caracas	2–0	3–0
Lanús (Argentina)	2–4	(Peru) Cienciano	2–0	0–4
Universidad Central (Venezuela)	3–8	(Brazil) Santos	1–4	2–4

=== Round of 16 ===
Team 1	Agg.	Team 2	1st leg	2nd leg
Boca Juniors (Argentina)	7–1	(Paraguay) Recoleta	3–1	4–0
Red Bull Bragantino (Brazil)	2–3	(Brazil) Atlético Mineiro	0–1	2–2
Cienciano (Peru)	6–2	(Brazil) Botafogo	6–1	0–1
Vasco da Gama (Brazil)	4–1	(Paraguay) Olimpia	0–0	4–1
Santa Fe (Colombia)	1–1 (8–7 p)	(Argentina) River Plate	0–0	1–1
Tigre (Argentina)	1–3	(Uruguay) Montevideo City Torque	0–1	1–2
Santos (Brazil)	2–1	(Ecuador) Macará	2–1	0–0
Bolívar (Bolivia)	2–4	(Brazil) São Paulo	1–1	1–3

=== Quarter-finals ===
Team 1	Agg.	Team 2	1st leg	2nd leg
Boca Juniors (Argentina)	2–1	(Brazil) São Paulo	1–0	1–1
Santos (Brazil)	4–4 (1–3 p)	(Brazil) Atlético Mineiro	2–0	2–4
Cienciano (Peru)	2–3	(Uruguay) Montevideo City Torque	2–0	0–3
Santa Fe (Colombia)	0–2	(Brazil) Vasco da Gama	0–0	0–2

=== Semi-finals ===
Team 1	Agg.	Team 2	1st leg	2nd leg
Boca Juniors (Argentina)	3–2	(Brazil) Vasco da Gama	0–1	3–1
Atlético Mineiro (Brazil)	3–2	(Uruguay) Montevideo City Torque	3–0	0–2

=== Final ===
The final was played on 21 November 2026 at Estadio Metropolitano Roberto Meléndez in Barranquilla, Colombia.

21 November 2026
17:30 UTC−5

Atlético Mineiro (Brazil)	0–2	(Argentina) Boca Juniors
	Report	Ascacíbar 16'; Merentiel 48'

Estadio Metropolitano Roberto Meléndez, Barranquilla
Referee: Andrés Matonte (Uruguay)

== Statistics ==
=== Top scorers ===
Rank	Player	Team	1S	GS1	GS2	GS3	GS4	GS5	GS6	KPO1	KPO2	⅛F1	⅛F2	QF1	QF2	SF1	SF2	F	Total
1	(Uruguay) Salomón Rodríguez	(Uruguay) Montevideo City Torque			1			1	1				2		2				7
2	(Brazil) Gabriel Barbosa	(Brazil) Santos				1		1	1		1	1			1				6
3	(Uruguay) Miguel Merentiel	(Argentina) Boca Juniors								1			1	1			1	1	5
3	(Argentina) Rodrigo Contreras	(Colombia) Millonarios	2				2		1										5
3	(Brazil) Bernard	(Brazil) Atlético Mineiro			1			1	1						1	1			5
3	(Brazil) Adson	(Brazil) Vasco da Gama				1			2				1			1			5
7	(Ecuador) Carlos Garcés	(Peru) Cienciano		1	1						2								4

Source: CONMEBOL Sudamericana

== See also ==
- 2026 Copa Libertadores
