= Jeremías Lucco =

Argentine footballer

Personal information
- Full name: Jeremías Nicolás Lucco Piccoli
- Date of birth: 10 December 2005 (age 20)
- Place of birth: Colonia Tirolesa, Córdoba, Argentina
- Height: 1.69 m (5 ft 7 in)
- Position: Attacking midfielder

Team information
- Current team: Defensa y Justicia (on loan from Belgrano)

Youth career
- Sportivo Colonia Tirolesa
- Belgrano

Senior career*
Years	Team	Apps	(Gls)
2023–	Belgrano	21	(2)
2026–	→ Defensa y Justicia (loan)	0	(0)
- * Club domestic league appearances and goals as of 16:45, 2 August 2026 (UTC)

Jeremías Nicolás Lucco Piccoli (born 10 December 2005) is an Argentine footballer who plays as an attacking midfielder for Argentine Primera División club Defensa y Justicia, on loan from Belgrano.

== Club career ==
Born in Colonia Tirolesa, Córdoba, Argentina, Lucco was with local club Sportivo Colonia Tirolesa before joining Belgrano. He made his professional debut in the 4–1 away loss against Racing Club on 27 November 2023 for the Copa de la Liga Profesional.

The next year, Lucco took part in the 2024 Copa Sudamericana and scored his first goal in the 1–4 away win against Tigre on 29 March. He scored a second goal in the 3–1 win against the classic rival, Instituto, on 11 November of the same year.

== International career ==
In 2024, Lucco took part in training sessions of Argentina U20 under Javier Mascherano.

== Honours ==
Belgrano

- Primera División: 2026 Apertura
