= Daniel Piña =

Chilean footballer

Personal information
- Full name: Daniel Aldair Piña Torres
- Date of birth: 16 November 2001 (age 24)
- Place of birth: Maipú, Santiago, Chile
- Height: 1.89 m (6 ft 2 in)
- Position: Centre-back

Team information
- Current team: Juárez
- Number: 26

Youth career
- 2010–2022: Audax Italiano

Senior career*
Years	Team	Apps	(Gls)
2022–2026	Audax Italiano	49	(1)
2023	→ Trasandino (loan)	16	(1)
2026–	Juárez	1	(0)
- * Club domestic league appearances and goals as of 19 September 2026

Daniel Aldair Piña Torres (born 16 November 2001) is a Chilean footballer who plays as a centre-back for Liga MX club Juárez.

== Club career ==
Born in Maipú commune, Santiago de Chile, Piña joined the Audax Italiano youth ranks in 2010, was promoted to the first team in 2022 and signed his first professional contract on 2 February alongside his fellow Tomás Ahumada. He made his senior debut in the 1–3 away win against San Antonio Unido on 25 June 2022 for the Copa Chile. He was sent on loan to Trasandino de Los Andes in the Segunda División Profesional de Chile during 2023 and scored his first goal in the 1–1 draw against Deportes Limache on 15 October.

On 11 September 2026, Piña signed a three-year contract with Liga MX side Juárez.

== Personal life ==
He is the older brother of Audax Italiano goalkeeper Cristóbal Piña.
