= Estadio Roque Battilana =

Multi-purpose stadium in Asunción, Paraguay

- Interactive map of Estadio Roque Battilana
- Location: Asunción, Paraguay
- Coordinates: 25.295103°S 57.588881°W
- Owner: Recoleta FC
- Capacity: 6,000
- Surface: Artificial turf

Construction
- Opened: 2002

Tenant
- Deportivo Recoleta

The Estadio Roque Battilana is a multi-purpose stadium, that is located in Asunción, Paraguay. In this scenario, with a capacity for 6,000 people, it serves as host of the football team Recoleta FC.
