= Arnaldo Castillo =

Paraguayan naturalized Chilean footballer

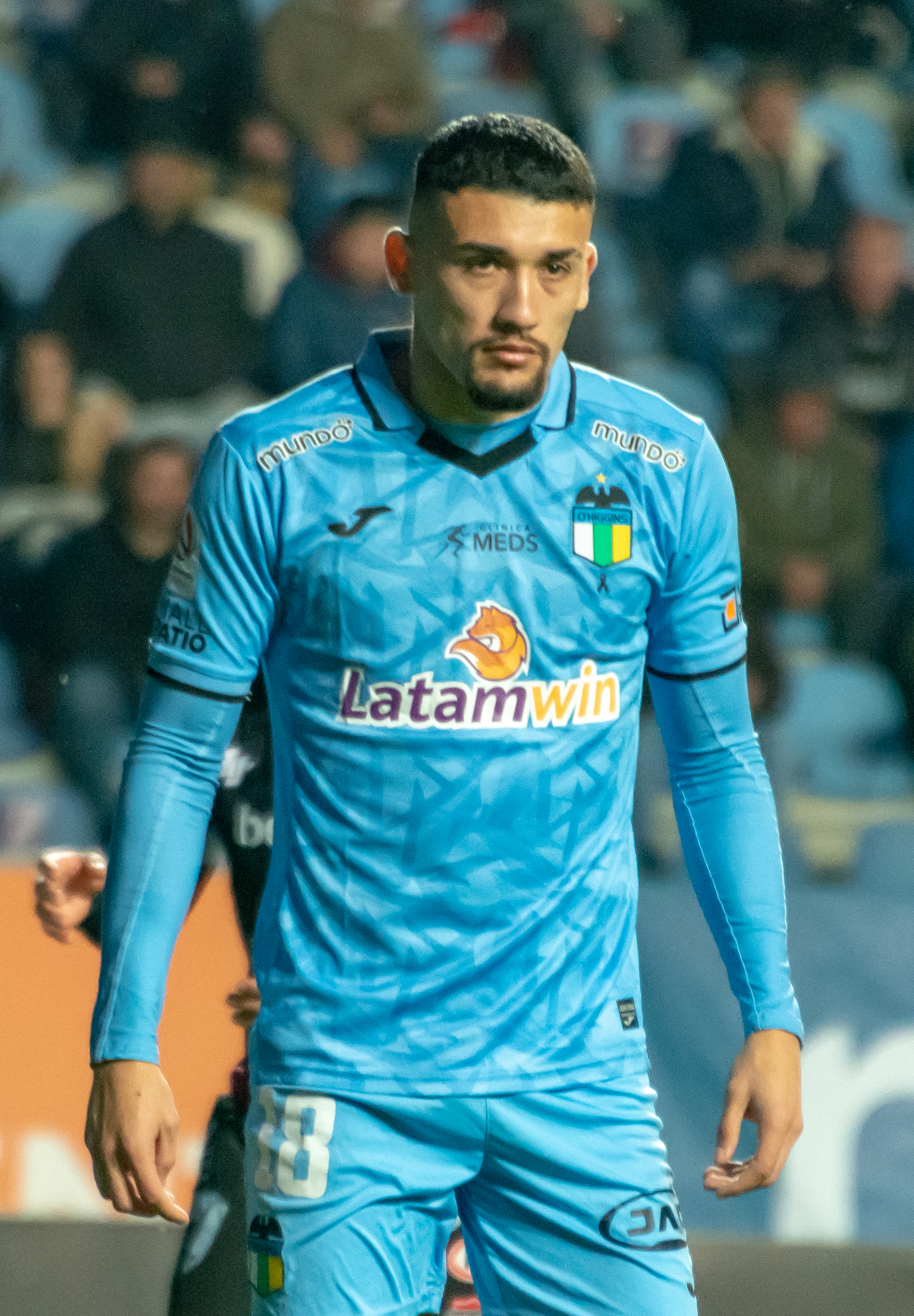
- Castillo with O'Higgins in 2023.

Personal information
- Full name: Arnaldo Castillo Benega
- Date of birth: 9 May 1997 (age 29)
- Place of birth: Ciudad del Este, Paraguay
- Height: 1.86 m (6 ft 1 in)
- Position: Forward

Team information
- Current team: O'Higgins
- Number: 18

Youth career
- Yguazú Nippon (Paraguay)
- Universidad de Concepción

Senior career*
Years	Team	Apps	(Gls)
2016–2019	Universidad de Concepción	1	(0)
2017	→ Naval (loan)	13	(5)
2018	→ Fernández Vial (loan)	22	(9)
2019	→ Iberia (loan)	22	(9)
2020–2021	Iberia	20	(12)
2021	Deportes Puerto Montt	32	(10)
2022	Universidad de Concepción	25	(11)
2023–	O'Higgins	94	(18)
- * Club domestic league appearances and goals as of 4 February 2026

Arnaldo Castillo Benega (Ciudad del Este, Paraguay; 9 May 1997) is a Paraguayan-Chilean footballer who plays as a forward and currently plays for O'Higgins of the Primera División de Chile.

== Career ==
Originally from Ciudad del Este, he came to youth football at the Universidad de Concepción in Chile at the age of 17. In 2017 he was loaned to Naval and in 2018 to Arturo Fernández Vial. He then plays two seasons in Iberia.

Castillo with O'Higgins in 2023 against Universidad de Chile.

In 2021 he was announced as a reinforcement of Deportes Puerto Montt of the Primera B de Chile, where he had a great campaign where he scored 10 goals. In December 2021, his return to Universidad de Concepción is announced. In December 2022, he was announced as O'Higgins ' reinforcement of the Primera División de Chile.

He debuted with the Rancagua's team on February 6, 2023, in a 0-1 loss against Huachipato. His first conquest with the "Capo de Provincia" came on March 4, 2023, scoring with a header and at 90 + 6 'the final 2-2 draw against Curicó Unido at Estadio El Teniente.

== Eligibility ==
Since Castillo has Chilean Citizenship through naturalization principles in September 2023, he is eligible to play for Chile and play as a Chilean player at Campeonato Nacional since 2024.

In March 2026, Castillo was shortlisted to the Paraguay squad for the friendly matches against Greece and Morocco.

== Career statistics ==
=== Club ===
Statistics for O'Higgins.

Club	Season	League			Cup		Continental		Others		Total	
Club	Season	Division	Apps	Goals	Apps	Goals	Apps	Goals	Apps	Goals	Apps	Goals
O'Higgins	2023	Liga de Primera	24	4	2	1	-	-	-	-	26	5
O'Higgins	2024	Liga de Primera	25	3	1	1	-	-	-	-	26	4
O'Higgins	2025	Liga de Primera	23	3	5	1	-	-	-	-	28	4
O'Higgins	2026	Liga de Primera	22	8	13	8	12	3	-	-	47	19
O'Higgins	Total		94	18	21	11	12	3	-	-	127	32
