= Yael Falcón =

Argentine football referee (born 1988)

- Born: Yael Falcón Pérez; 15 December 1988 (age 37); Buenos Aires, Argentina
- Other occupation: Physical education teacher; Lifeguard

Domestic
Years	League	Role
2019–present	AFA Liga Profesional de Fútbol	Referee

International
Years	League	Role
2022–present	FIFA listed	Referee

Yael Falcón Pérez (born 15 December 1988) is an Argentine football referee who has been on the FIFA International Referees List since 2022.

== Career ==
=== National ===
Born in Buenos Aires in December 1988, Falcón began refereeing matches in the Primera C division of Argentine football in 2017. On 22 July of that year, Falcón was labelled a hero for his actions in assisting player Isaías Olariaga of Club Atlético San Miguel, who suffered from convulsions following a head collision with a rival, Javier Velázquez of Defensores Unidos. Falcón's knowledge in first aid helped stabilize Olariaga until an ambulance arrived and took him to Hospital Argerich, where he made a full recovery. Falcón credited his training as a lifeguard and the training that he had received in San Bernardo del Tuyú, where he worked the summer season as a lifeguard.

Falcón made his debut in the 2018–19 Superliga Argentina in a match between Unión de Santa Fe and Newell's Old Boys. By then, he had taken part in eight Primera B Nacional matches and two Copa Argentinas. Among his most renowned performances are the 2023 Supercopa Argentina between Club Atlético River Plate and Estudiantes de La Plata and two Superclásico games between River Plate and Boca Juniors in 2023 and 2024. One of his most controversial matches was a match between River Plate and Club Atlético Platense in the Estadio Monumental, where he made detrimental decisions against Platense in a crucial game for the team that ultimately managed to ascend to the top-tier league. During the penalty shootout draw after the match ended in a tie, Platense's captain Ignacio Vázquez did not make eye contact with Falcón and did not address him directly due to his anger. Falcón later apologized to Platense's players and managers for the mistakes he committed.

In May 2026, Falcón was selected as the referee of the Torneo Apertura final between River Plate and Club Atlético Belgrano at the Estadio Mario Alberto Kempes in Córdoba.

=== International ===
A May 2025 note by Clarín described Falcón as a favourite of Claudio Tapia, the president of the Argentine Football Association. His career quickly rose in prominence, with the coordinator of the referees' body, former referee Federico Beligoy, assigning several matches in the Primera B and the AFA Liga Profesional de Fútbol to Falcón. He was subsequently promoted to international FIFA status in 2022.

International competitions within CONMEBOL for Falcón include Copa Sudamericana and Copa Libertadores editions and qualification matches for the 2026 FIFA World Cup, making his debut on 20 March 2025 in a match between Peru and Bolivia. In 2024, Falcón was chosen for the 2024 Copa América in the United States, where he oversaw a single group stage match for Group D between Costa Rica and Paraguay at the Q2 Stadium in Austin, Texas. Falcón had another controversial performance, this time at a game between Alianza Lima of Peru and Deportes Iquique during the 2025 Copa Libertadores's third round.

Between 2023 and 2024, Falcón also refereed in Saudi football after the Saudis submitted a request for professional referees. Also outside CONMEBOL, Falcón was appointed as a referee for the 2023 FIFA U-20 World Cup in his native Argentina. Falcón was appointed as a referee for the men's tournament of the 2024 Summer Olympics. In April 2026 FIFA named Falcón as a central referee for the 2026 edition of the FIFA World Cup along with fellow Argentine assistant referees Facundo Rodríguez and Maximiliano Del Yesso.

== Personal life ==
Falcón is a physical education teacher by profession and, in addition to his refereeing activities, was a municipal employee in the city of Lanús from 2020 to 2023. In 2017, he was honored by the Argentine Olympic Committee for his courageous reaction during the Primera C match where he is credited with saving Olariaga's life following a head collision. He also worked for the local government of Mayor Néstor Grindetti in Lanús (2015–2023).

Falcón resides in Lanús.

== Selected performances ==
2024 Copa América – United States
Date	Match	Result	Round	Venue
2 July 2024	Costa Rica – Paraguay	2–1	Group stage	Q2 Stadium, Austin, Texas
2024 Summer Olympics – Men's tournament – Paris
Date	Match	Result	Round	Venue
24 July 2024	France – United States	3–0	Group stage	Stade Vélodrome, Marseille
2 August 2024	Morocco – United States	4–0	Quarter-finals	Parc des Princes, Paris
2026 Torneo Apertura
Date	Match	Result	Round	Venue
24 May 2026	River Plate – Belgrano	2–3	Final	Estadio Mario Alberto Kempes, Córdoba
2026 FIFA World Cup – North America
Date	Match	Result	Round	Venue
14 June 2026	Sweden – Tunisia	5–1	Group stage	Estadio BBVA, Guadalupe, Nuevo León
24 June 2026	Czech Republic – Mexico	0–3	Group stage	Estadio Azteca, Mexico City
2 July 2026	Switzerland – Algeria	2–0	Round of 32	BC Place, Vancouver
