= Facundo González (footballer, born 2006) =

Argentine footballer (born 2006)

Personal information
- Full name: Facundo Martín González
- Date of birth: 3 April 2006 (age 20)
- Place of birth: San Francisco, Córdoba.
- Height: 1.80 m (5 ft 11 in)
- Position: Defender

Team information
- Current team: River Plate
- Number: 31

Youth career
- Tarzanito
- Centro Deportivo River
- 2016–: River Plate

Senior career*
Years	Team	Apps	(Gls)
2026–	River Plate	2	(0)

International career
2021–2023	Argentina U17	6	(1)
- * Club domestic league appearances and goals

Facundo Martín González (born 3 April 2006) is an Argentine professional association football player who plays as an left-back for Argentine Primera División club River Plate.

== Club career ==
=== Early career ===
González was born on 3 April 2026 on San Francisco, Argentina. He took his first steps in his hometown, playing for amateur clubs like Tarzanito and Centro Deportivo River. In 2016, after a trial in Buenos Aires, he joined the Club Atlético River Plate's youth academy.

=== River Plate ===
In his years during River's academy, González played as an attacking midfielder. It wasn't until the following year that the coaches recognized his physical and technical potential and moved him back on the field, first as a center-back and occasionally as a left-back, the position he occupies today.

In January 2026, he was called up by Marcelo Gallardo to participate in preseason with the senior team. He made his unofficial debut in a friendly match against Millonarios, which ended in a 1-0 victory.

He would make his official debut on 26 February 2026 in a match against Banfield as a starting player in the Marcelo Gallardo's farewell as River's historic coach.

== International career ==
González was called up by Pablo Aimar to play with the Argentina national under-17 football team, where he played 6 matches and scored 1 goal.
