= Salomón Rodríguez =

Uruguayan footballer (born 2000)

Personal information
- Full name: Ederson Salomón Rodríguez Lima
- Date of birth: 16 February 2000 (age 26)
- Place of birth: San Gregorio de Polanco, Uruguay
- Height: 1.87 m (6 ft 2 in)
- Position: Forward

Team information
- Current team: Montevideo City Torque (on loan from Colo-Colo)
- Number: 9

Youth career
- Rentistas

Senior career*
Years	Team	Apps	(Gls)
2020–2021	Rentistas	54	(15)
2022–2024	Godoy Cruz	75	(19)
2025–	Colo-Colo	17	(1)
2026–	→ Montevideo City Torque (loan)	23	(14)
- * Club domestic league appearances and goals as of 09:13, 27 September 2026 (UTC)

Ederson Salomón Rodríguez Lima (born 16 February 2000) is a Uruguayan professional footballer who plays as a forward for Liga AUF Uruguaya club Montevideo City Torque, on loan from Chilean club Colo-Colo.

== Career ==
=== Club career ===
Rodríguez made his league debut for the club on 16 February 2020, coming on as a 70th-minute substitute for Renato César in a 2–0 home victory over Nacional.

On 1 February 2022, Salomón joined Argentine Primera División club Godoy Cruz on a three-year deal.

On 17 January 2025, Rodríguez signed with Colo-Colo in the Chilean Primera División. The next year, he was loaned out to Montevideo City Torque.
