= Recoleta FC =

Paraguayan football club

Recoleta
- Full name: Recoleta Football Club
- Nicknames: Los Canarios, Los Funebreros
- Founded: February 12, 1931; 95 years ago
- Ground: Estadio Roque Battilana
- Capacity: 6,000
- Chairman: Luis Vidal
- Manager: Jorge González
- League: División de Honor
- 2025: División de Honor, 6th of 12
Home colours	Away colours

Recoleta FC, previously known as Club Deportivo Recoleta or simply known as Recoleta, is a Paraguayan association football club from the neighbourhood of the same name in Asunción. Founded in 1931, it currently plays in the Paraguayan Primera División after winning the 2024 División Intermedia championship.

== History ==
Deportivo Recoleta was founded on 12 February 1931 following the merger of the clubs 2 de Julio and Unión Pacífico. It took its name from the neighborhood where the Recoleta church was located, with Juan Gardel as its first chairman. In 1941, it bought the plot of land where Estadio Roque Battilana is currently located. The club gained its nickname of Funebrero (undertaker) due to the location of the stadium, as it is located behind the Recoleta Cemetery.

The club first competed in the Federación Paraguaya de Deportes (Paraguayan Sports Federation) from 1936 to 1948, in which it won four tournaments in 1938, 1940, 1942 and 1943, joining the Paraguayan Football Association in 1949.

In 1971 Deportivo Recoleta won the Segunda de Ascenso (third tier) championship, earning promotion to the Primera de Ascenso, and in 1997 it became one of the clubs that took part in the first División Intermedia championship, which it won in 2001 allowing them to compete in the Paraguayan Primera División for the first time in history. However, their participation in the top flight was short-lived as they were relegated after just one season, and they were further relegated back to the third tier the following season.

In 2015, both Deportivo Recoleta and Sportivo Ameliano gained promotion from the Primera División C to the Primera División B for the 2016 season, with Recoleta defeating Ameliano in the final to win the Primera C title. They competed in Primera B until the 2022 season, in which they won the title as well as promotion back to the División Intermedia after winning 20 matches, drawing eight and losing four for a total of 68 points.

After spending two seasons in División Intermedia, Deportivo Recoleta won their second title in the second tier in 2024, returning to Primera División for the 2025 season.

In the club's second season in the top flight, they managed to finish 6th in the league, which was enough for them to qualify for the Copa Sudamericana, being this the first time they qualified for any CONMEBOL-sanctioned competition in their history.

== Notable players ==
To appear in this section a player must have either:

- Played at least 125 games for the club.
- Set a club record or won an individual award while at the club.
- Been part of a national team at any time.
- Played in the first division of any other football association (outside of Paraguay).
- Played in a continental and/or intercontinental competition.

- 2000's
- (Paraguay) Aureliano Torres (2002–2003)
- (Paraguay) Osvaldo Mendoza (2003)
- 2010's
- (Paraguay) Roberto Acuña (2015, 2016–)
- (Paraguay) Derlis Ortiz

Non-CONMEBOL players

- (Cameroon) Tobie Mimboe (1993)

== Honours ==
- Paraguayan Second Division: 2

2001, 2024

- Paraguayan Third Division: 2

1971, 2022

== Other disciplines ==
=== Futsal ===
The club's futsal division plays in the Liga Premium, the first division of the Paraguayan futsal league system.

=== Volleyball ===
The women's volleyball team has reached the Top 4 of the South American Women's Volleyball Club Championship twice.
