= 2025 Barracas Central season =

Barracas Central
2025 season
- Chairman: Matías Tapia
- Manager: Ruben Insua
- Stadium: Estadio Claudio Chiqui Tapia
- Torneo Apertura: Round of 16
- Torneo Clausura: Quarter-finals
- Copa Argentina: Round of 64
Home colours	Away colours	Third colours

The 2025 season was the 121st for Club Atlético Barracas Central and their 4th consecutive season in the Primera División. The club also participated in the Copa Argentina.

== Squad ==
=== Current squad ===
As of 25 January, 2025

Note: Flags indicate national team as defined under FIFA eligibility rules; some limited exceptions apply. Players may hold more than one non-FIFA nationality.

No.	Pos.	Nation	Player
2	DF	ARG	Nicolás Capraro
5	MF	ARG	Dardo Miloc
6	DF	ARG	Rodrigo Insúa
7	FW	ARG	Facundo Bruera (on loan from San Lorenzo de Almagro)
8	MF	ARG	Siro Rosane
9	FW	ARG	Gonzalo Morales (on loan from Boca Juniors)
10	FW	ARG	Nahuel Barrios (on loan from San Lorenzo de Almagro)
11	MF	ARG	Javier Ruiz (on loan from Independiente)
13	DF	ARG	Rafael Barrios
14	DF	ARG	Kevin Jappert
18	FW	ARG	Facundo Krüger (on loan from Atlético Temperley)
19	MF	ARG	Tomás Porra

No.	Pos.	Nation	Player
20	FW	URU	Jhonatan Candia
23	MF	ARG	Iván Tapia
24	MF	ARG	Manuel Duarte (on loan from Defensa y Justicia)
26	DF	ARG	Agustín Irazoque
28	GK	ARG	Marcos Ledesma (on loan from Defensa y Justicia)
30	GK	ARG	Marcelo Miño (on loan from Ferro Carril Oeste)
31	DF	ARG	Nicolás Demartini
32	DF	ARG	Fernando Tobio
33	MF	SYR	Facundo Mater (on loan from Argentinos)
36	FW	ARG	Alex Juarez
79	MF	ARG	Maximiliano Puig
—	MF	ARG	Ignacio Tapia (on loan from Belgrano)

=== Transfers In ===
Pos.	Player	Transferred from	Fee	Date	Source
MF	(Argentina) Dylan Glaby	(Chile) Coquimbo Unido	Loan	1 July 2025	

=== Transfers Out ===
Pos.	Player	Transferred to	Fee	Date	Source
DF	(Argentina) Gonzalo Goñi	(Argentina) Platense	Free	4 February 2025	

== Competitions ==
=== Overall record ===
Competition	First match	Last match	Starting round	Final position	Record							
Competition	First match	Last match	Starting round	Final position	Pld	W	D	L	GF	GA	GD	Win %
Torneo Apertura	24 January 2025	12 May 2025	Matchday 1	Round of 16	17	7	5	5	20	21	−1	41.18
Torneo Clausura	12 July 2025	1 December 2025	Matchday 1	Quarter-finals	18	6	8	4	20	19	+1	33.33
Copa Argentina	17 April 2025		Round of 64	Round of 64	1	0	0	1	0	2	−2	0.00
Total					36	13	13	10	40	42	−2	36.11

Source: Competitions

=== Primera División ===
==== Torneo Apertura ====
===== League table =====
Pos	Team	Pld	W	D	L	GF	GA	GD	Pts	Qualification
5	Tigre	16	8	3	5	18	12	+6	27	Advance to round of 16
6	Independiente Rivadavia	16	7	6	3	20	17	+3	27	Advance to round of 16
7	Barracas Central	16	7	5	4	20	18	+2	26	Advance to round of 16
8	Estudiantes (LP)	16	5	6	5	18	19	−1	21	Advance to round of 16
9	Newell's Old Boys	16	5	4	7	12	15	−3	19	

Source: AFA

===== Results by round =====
Round	1
Ground	H
Result	
Position	

A = Away; H = Home; W = Win; D = Draw; L = Loss

===== Matches =====
24 January 2025 1	Barracas Central	1–3	Racing	Sarandí
17:00 UTC−3	Bruera 21'	Report	Vietto 30'; Martínez 74'; Balboa 90+2'	Stadium: Estadio Julio Humberto Grondona

28 January 2025 2	Independiente Rivadavia	0–0	Barracas Central	Mendoza
21:30 UTC−3		Report		Stadium: Estadio Bautista Gargantini

1 February 2025 3	Barracas Central	1–0	Banfield	Sarandí
17:00 UTC−3	Jappert 18'	Report		Stadium: Estadio Julio Humberto Grondona

6 February 2025 4	Aldosivi	1–3	Barracas Central	Mar del Plata
17:00 UTC−3	Rami 90+7'	Report	Candia 28', 35'; Bruera 89'	Stadium: Estadio José María Minella

11 February 2025 5	Barracas Central	3–3	Central Córdoba	Sarandí
17:45 UTC−3	Candia 55'; Ruiz 73'; Insúa 90+6' (pen.)		Florentín 62'; Bruera 75' (o.g.); Rivero 80'	Stadium: Estadio Julio Humberto Grondona

15 February 2025 6	Defensa y Justicia	1–1	Barracas Central	Gobernador Costa
17:00 UTC−3	Miritello 37'	Report	Insúa 90+9' (pen.)	Stadium: Estadio Norberto "Tito" Tomaghello

24 February 2025 7	Barracas Central	2–0	Newell's Old Boys	Sarandí
17:00 UTC−3	Candia 2'; Duarte 90+1'			Stadium: Estadio Julio Humberto Grondona

3 March 2025 8	Barracas Central	1–2	Godoy Cruz	Sarandí
17:00 UTC−3	Bruera 51'	Report	Martínez 26', 90'	Stadium: Estadio Julio Humberto Grondona

8 March 2025 9	Sarmiento	1–1	Barracas Central	Junín
21:30 UTC−3	Magnín 65'	Report	Morales 90+7'	Stadium: Estadio Eva Perón

16 March 2025 10	Belgrano	1–1	Barracas Central	Córdoba
21:00 UTC−3	Fernández 31'	Report	Tobio 36'	Stadium: El Gigante de Alberdi

27 March 2025 11	Barracas Central	2–1	Estudiantes	Sarandí
18:00 UTC−3	Tapia 24'; Bruera 88'	Report	Palacios 83'	Stadium: Estadio Julio Humberto Grondona

6 April 2025 12	Boca Juniors	1–0	Barracas Central	Buenos Aires
18:00 UTC−3	Battaglia 39'	Report		Stadium: La Bombonera; Referee: Fernando Echenique

12 April 2025 13	Barracas Central	1–0	Tigre	Buenos Aires
18:00 UTC−3	Candia 16'	Report		Stadium: Estadio Claudio Chiqui Tapia

22 April 2025 14	Argentinos Juniors	3–0	Barracas Central	Buenos Aires
19:00 UTC−3	Molina 31'; Jappert 42' (o.g.); Herrera 47'	Report		Stadium: Estadio Diego Armando Maradona

28 April 2025 15	Barracas Central	2–1	Unión	Buenos Aires
15:00 UTC−3	Candia 43'; Bruera 86'	Report	Palacios 33'	Stadium: Estadio Claudio Chiqui Tapia

3 May 2025 16	Huracán	0–1	Barracas Central	Buenos Aires
21:00 UTC−3		Report	Jappert 49'	Stadium: Estadio Tomás Adolfo Ducó

===== Final stages =====
12 May 2025 Round of 16	River Plate	3–0	Barracas Central	Buenos Aires
20:30	Díaz 11'; Fernández 42'; Acuña 87'	Report		Stadium: Mâs Monumental; Referee: Sebastián Zunino

==== Torneo Clausura ====
===== League table =====
Pos	Team	Pld	W	D	L	GF	GA	GD	Pts	Qualification
4	Central Córdoba (SdE)	16	5	9	2	17	11	+6	24	Advance to round of 16
5	Argentinos Juniors	16	7	3	6	18	13	+5	24	Advance to round of 16
6	Barracas Central	16	5	8	3	19	17	+2	23	Advance to round of 16
7	Tigre	16	5	7	4	14	13	+1	22	Advance to round of 16
8	Estudiantes (LP)	16	6	3	7	17	18	−1	21	Advance to round of 16

Source: AFA

===== Matches =====
12 July 2025 1	Racing	0–1	Barracas Central	Avellaneda
20:45 UTC−3		Report	Insúa 90+13' (pen.)	Stadium: El Cilindro

20 July 2025 2	Barracas Central	0–3	Independiente Rivadavia	Buenos Aires
14:30 UTC−3		Report	Retamar 48', 52'; Arce 90+1'	Stadium: Estadio Claudio Chiqui Tapia

28 July 2025 3	Banfield	1–3	Barracas Central	Banfield
20:00 UTC−3	Auzmendi 33'	Report	Ruiz 20'; Tobio 35'; Jappert 44'	Stadium: Estadio Florencio Sola

10 August 2025 4	Barracas Central	3–1	Aldosivi	Buenos Aires
15:00 UTC−3	Bruera 28', 58'; Morales 48'	Report	Serrago 50'	Stadium: Estadio Claudio Chiqui Tapia

17 August 2025 5	Central Córdoba	1–1	Barracas Central	Santiago del Estero
16:15 UTC−3	Abascia 60'	Report	Ruiz 16'	Stadium: Alfredo Terrera

22 August 2025 6	Barracas Central	1–1	Defensa y Justicia	Buenos Aires
15:30 UTC−3	Tapia 90+6'	Report	Miritello 60'	Stadium: Estadio Claudio Chiqui Tapia

29 August 2025 7	Newell's Old Boys	1–2	Barracas Central	Rosario
19:00 UTC−3	González 20'	Report	Bruera 45+2'; Tapia 58'	Stadium: Estadio Marcelo Bielsa

13 September 2025 8	Godoy Cruz	0–0	Barracas Central	Godoy Cruz
14:30 UTC−3		Report		Stadium: Estadio Feliciano Gambarte

20 August 2025 9	Barracas Central	0–1	Sarmiento	Buenos Aires
14:30 UTC−3		Report	Villalba 22'	Stadium: Estadio Claudio Chiqui Tapia

29 September 2025 10	Barracas Central	1–1	Belgrano	Buenos Aires
15:30 UTC−3	Candia 16'	Report	Jara 49'	Stadium: Estadio Claudio Chiqui Tapia

5 October 2025 11	Estudiantes	1–1	Barracas Central	La Plata
16:30 UTC−3	Carrillo 33'	Report	Candia 49'	Stadium: Estadio Jorge Luis Hirschi

20 October 2025 13	Tigre	2–2	Barracas Central	Victoria
21:30 UTC−3	Russo 83'; Medina 90+3'	Report	Candia 27'; Morales 84'	Stadium: Estadio José Dellagiovanna

27 October 2025 12	Barracas Central	1–3	Boca Juniors	Buenos Aires
16:00 UTC−3	Insúa 19'	Report	Giménez 52', 55'; Merentiel 65'	Stadium: Claudio Tapia; Referee: Nicolás Lamolina
Note: Match postponed due to the death of Miguel Ángel Russo.

1 November 2025 14	Barracas Central	2–0	Argentinos Juniors	Buenos Aires
16:00 UTC−3	Bruera 4', 86'	Report		Stadium: Estadio Claudio Chiqui Tapia

8 November 2025 15	Unión	0–0	Barracas Central	Santa Fe
21:30 UTC−3		Report		Stadium: Estadio 15 de Abril

17 November 2025 16	Barracas Central	1–1	Huracán	Buenos Aires
17:00 UTC−3	Insúa 78'	Report	Ojeda 28'	Stadium: Estadio Claudio Chiqui Tapia

===== Final stages =====
24 November 2025 Round of 16	Deportivo Riestra	0–1 (a.e.t.)	Barracas Central	Buenos Aires
17:00		Report	Blandi 115'	Stadium: Estadio Guillermo Laza; Referee: Nicolás Ramírez

1 December 2025 Quarter-finals	Barracas Central	0–2	Gimnasia y Esgrima	Buenos Aires
17:00		Report	Panaro 21'; F. Torres 90+2'	Stadium: Estadio Claudio Chiqui Tapia; Referee: Hernán Mastrángelo

=== Copa Argentina ===
17 April 2025 Round of 64	Barracas Central	0–2	Defensores de Belgrano	Sarandí
17:00		Report	Bruera 46' (o.g.); González 84'	Stadium: Julio Humberto Grondona; Referee: Nicolás Lamolina
