= Estadio Claudio Chiqui Tapia =

Football stadium in Buenos Aires, Argentina

Claudio "Chiqui" Tapia Stadium
- Estadio Claudio "Chiqui" Tapia

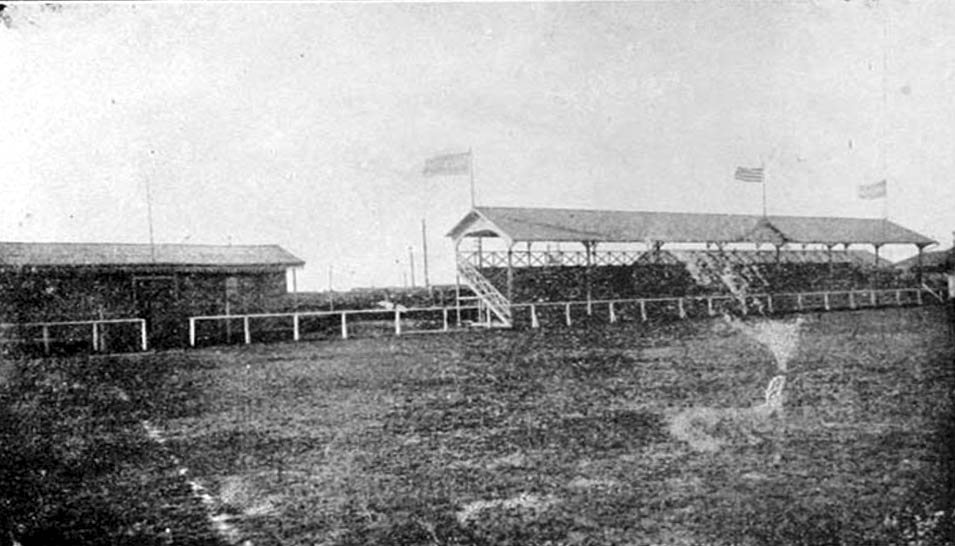
- The stadium in 1922
- Interactive map of Claudio "Chiqui" Tapia Stadium
- Full name: Estadio Claudio Fabián Tapia
- Former names: Estadio Olavarría y Luna (1916–2008)
- Address: Avenida Olavaría 3400; Buenos Aires; Argentina
- Coordinates: 34°38′49″S 58°23′47″W
- Owner: Barracas Central
- Capacity: 12,000
- Surface: Grass
- Field size: 101 x 68 m

Construction
- Opened: 1916; 110 years ago
- Renovated: 1970, 2004, 2006, 2011, 2021
- Expanded: 2023–25

Tenant
- Barracas Central (1916–present)

Estadio Claudio "Chiqui" Tapia is a football stadium located in the Barracas neighborhood of Buenos Aires, Argentina. The stadium has a capacity of 12,000 spectators and is the home ground of Barracas Central.

Having been opened in 1916, the stadium is one of the oldest in the city of Buenos Aires.

== History ==
Inaugurated in 1916, the stadium was initially called "Estadio Olavarría y Luna", being renamed to "Estadio Claudio Fabián Tapia" in 2008, as an honour to "Chiqui" Tapia, who was the president of the club at that time. Tapia had been also player of the club.

The stadium its original structure of wooden grandstands until 1970, when the club replaced them by cement stands, also removing the roof in the official grandstand. In 2006, a new grandstand for visitors was inaugurated on one of the sides. Five years later, eight press boxes were inaugurated. The royal boxes were named "Julio Grondona" and "Hugo Moyano" (then president of Club Atlético Independiente and father-in-law of Tapia).

After Barracas Central promoted to Primera División in 2021 after beating Quilmes on penalties, the team had to play their home matches in other stadiums because the Barracas venue did not meet security requirements that the Argentine Football Association demanded. However, in August 2022 AFA lifted the restrictions, allowing the stadium to be used.

The stadium was reinaugurated in July 2025, after being expanded from 6,000 to 12,000 spectators. It is expected that the stadium increases its capacity to 18,000 spectators after a second stage of expansion. Work had begun in mid-2023 and included the demolition of old stands, the construction of two new side stands, and a complete renovation of the playing field, installing a modern drainage system. The locker rooms were also renovated. Apart from that, a lighting system was installed. The refurbished stadium was reopened to host Barracas Central vs Independiente Rivadavia match of 2025 Torneo Clausura.

== See also ==
- List of football stadiums in Argentina
