= Claudio Tapia =

Argentine football executive

Claudio Fabián Tapia
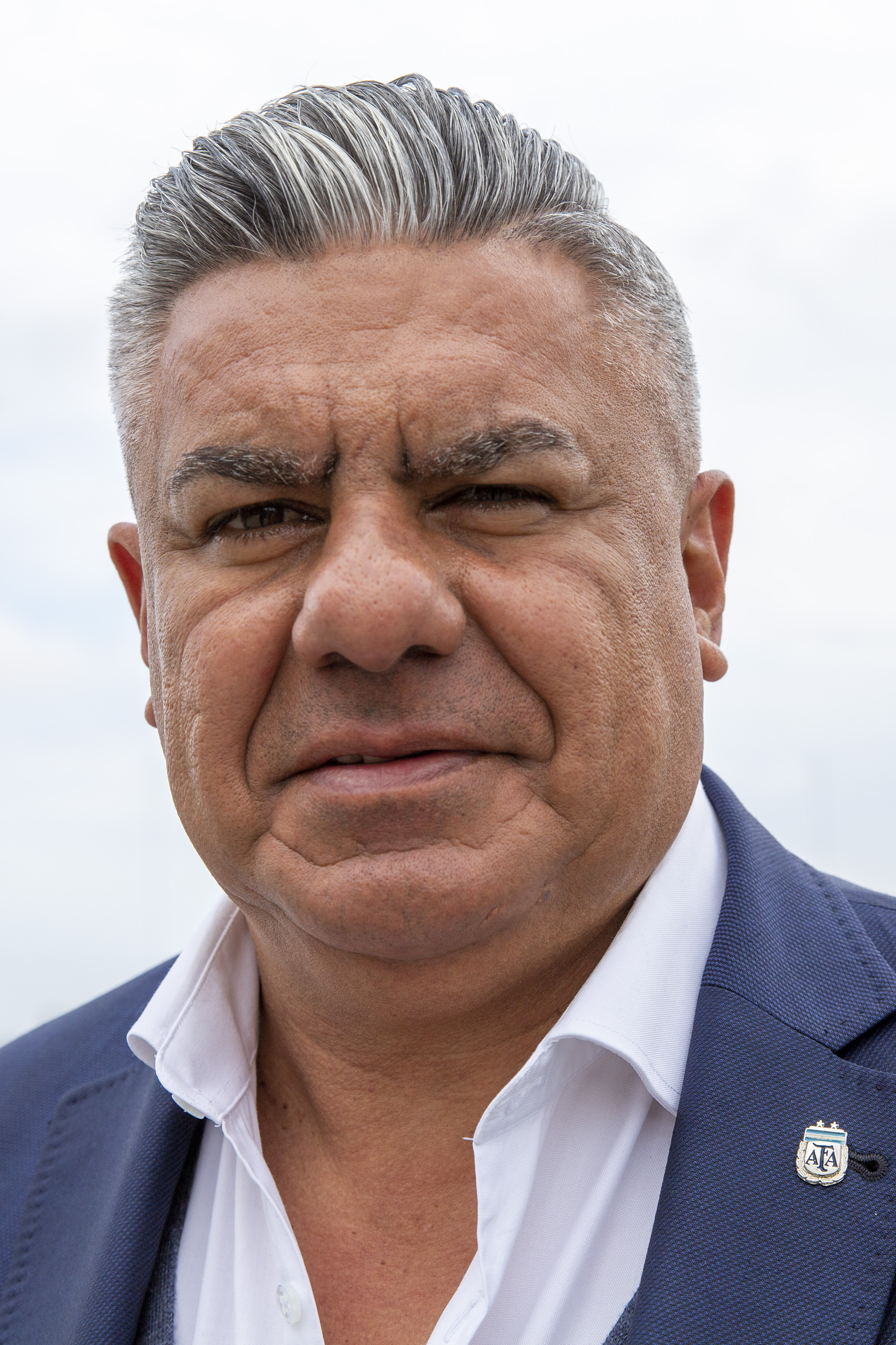
- Tapia in 2020
- Born: 22 September 1967 (age 59); Concepción, San Juan, Argentina
- Other name: Chiqui
- Occupation: Football executive
- Known for: President of the Argentine Football Association
- Notable work: President of Barracas Central (2001–2020); President of the AFA (2017–present); Member of the FIFA Council (2025–present); President of CEAMSE (2025–present)

Claudio Fabián "Chiqui" Tapia (born 22 September 1967) is an Argentine football executive who has been president of the Argentine Football Association (AFA) since March 2017. He also presides over the Liga Profesional de Fútbol, the entity that organises the Primera División championship, and since 2025 he has been a member of the FIFA Council representing CONMEBOL. At club level, Tapia was president of Barracas Central from 2001 to 2020.

During his AFA presidency, the Argentina national football team won the 2021 Copa América, the 2022 Finalissima, the 2022 FIFA World Cup and the 2024 Copa América. His tenure has also drawn significant controversy, including allegations of refereeing favouritism towards Barracas Central, a prolonged dispute with the government of Javier Milei over the introduction of privately owned football clubs, the awarding of a league title to Rosario Central in 2025, and a money-laundering investigation into Sur Finanzas, a financial firm that sponsored the AFA.

Tapia was also vice-president (2015–2024) and is now president (2025–present) of CEAMSE (Spanish: Coordinación Ecológica Área Metropolitana Sociedad del Estado), a public company that operates on the handling and processing of municipal solid waste in Greater Buenos Aires.

== Early life ==
Tapia was born on 22 September 1967 in Concepción, San Juan Province, to Washington Tapia and Leonor Olivera. As a child, he moved with his family to Buenos Aires, where he studied in San Telmo and grew up in the Barracas neighbourhood.

Tapia played in Independiente's youth divisions and then as a striker for Barracas Central, where he was part of the senior squad, before moving to Sportivo Dock Sud. After his playing career ended prematurely, he started working at the Argentine lorry drivers' union (Sindicato de Camioneros).

== Club career ==
In 2000, a group of members of Barracas Central invited him to return to the club, and Tapia became its president in June 2001. Under his leadership, Barracas Central won the 2009–10 (es) Primera C championship, and the 2018–19 (es) Primera B Metropolitana championship, promoting to Primera Nacional, the second level of Argentine football. His tenure at Barracas Central ended in March 2020, after more than 18 years. His son Matías replaced him as president of the club.

== AFA presidency ==
Within the AFA, Tapia sat on the executive committee for the Primera C division and was later appointed the association's tournaments secretary. In 2015 he became second vice-president of the AFA.

Tapia was voted president of the AFA on 29 March 2017, with a mandate until 2021. The vote was passed with 40 votes in favour and 3 abstentions. He replaced Luis Segura, who was forced to resign when fraud charges were brought against him in June 2016.

Shortly after taking office, Tapia dismissed national team coach Edgardo Bauza and appointed Jorge Sampaoli, who was in turn dismissed after Argentina's poor showing at the 2018 FIFA World Cup in Russia; Lionel Scaloni, initially a caretaker, was confirmed as permanent head coach in November 2018. Under Scaloni, Argentina won the 2021 Copa América, the 2022 Finalissima against Italy, the 2022 FIFA World Cup in Qatar — the country's first world title in 36 years — and the 2024 Copa América. On 25 March 2025, Argentina became the first team to qualify for the 2026 FIFA World Cup, finishing the South American qualifiers in first place with 38 points. In the tournament, Argentina reached their second consecutive World Cup final, and Scaloni was hoping to become the first coach to win back-to-back World Cups since Vittorio Pozzo of Italy, but they lost to Spain after extra time. Following the defeat, Tapia acknowledged the loss, urged Scaloni to remain in his position, and doubled down on his support, publicly stating that Scaloni remains his "Plans A, B, and C" for the future of the national team.

In May 2020, in the AFA's first virtual assembly, Tapia was re-elected by acclamation for the 2021–2025 term; the same assembly dissolved the Superliga and created the Liga Profesional de Fútbol under the AFA's control.

On 17 October 2024, an AFA assembly re-elected Tapia unopposed for a new term running until 2029, with Juan Román Riquelme as first vice-president; the assembly also abolished that season's relegations and approved a 30-team top flight. Argentina's corporate regulator, the Inspección General de Justicia, had challenged the assembly as irregular, but an appeals court upheld its decisions.

In May 2025, CONMEBOL designated Tapia as its representative on the FIFA Council, replacing Ednaldo Rodrigues, and in November 2025 he was ratified in the seat until 2027.

== Controversies ==
=== Refereeing and Barracas Central ===
Since Barracas Central's promotion to the Primera División, the club — presided over by Tapia's son Matías and captained by his son Iván — has been the subject of repeated public allegations of favourable refereeing. In November 2025, deregulation minister Federico Sturzenegger publicised a statistical report claiming that Barracas Central's results improved in a "statistically significant" way after Tapia became AFA president, and an Argentine referees' union (SADRA) accused the AFA of "irregularities" and "manipulation of results" in referee appointments. Tapia and the AFA have rejected the allegations.

=== Dispute over club ownership ===
Tapia defends the Argentine model of clubs as non-profit civil associations and has publicly opposed the introduction of privately owned clubs (sociedades anónimas deportivas, SAD), promoted first by Mauricio Macri and later by the government of Javier Milei. The dispute escalated into a prolonged confrontation between the AFA and the national government.

=== Rosario Central title and Estudiantes sanctions ===
On 20 November 2025, the Liga Profesional, chaired by Tapia, proclaimed Rosario Central "2025 league champion" for topping the annual aggregate table — a trophy not provided for in the tournament regulations — prompting widespread criticism from clubs, former players and the national government. In protest, Estudiantes de La Plata players turned their backs during the guard of honour for the new champions. The AFA disciplinary tribunal suspended Estudiantes president Juan Sebastián Verón from football activity for six months, banned the eleven starting players for two matches and fined the club; Estudiantes appealed Verón's suspension.

=== Sur Finanzas investigation ===
Since late 2025, Argentine federal courts have been investigating Sur Finanzas — a financial firm owned by businessman Ariel Vallejo, an associate of Tapia, which sponsored the AFA and several clubs — for suspected money laundering, tax evasion and criminal conspiracy. In February 2026 some thirty raids were carried out in connection with the firm, and in May 2026 prosecutors requested that Vallejo also be indicted for fraudulent administration. The main target of the investigation is Vallejo; media reports describe Tapia as linked to the firm through its sponsorship contracts, without any charge against him.

=== Messi's Farewell ===
On 15 September 2026, Tapia made an official communication with AFA inviting back Lionel Messi to partake in a farewell match dedicated to him on 6 October 2026 against Benin. This match would also serve as Nicolás Otamendi's final farewell match as members of Argentina's national football team. The opponent selection drew critiques from many as Benin has "almost no football relevancy" with Argentina, adding that teams such as Brazil and Uruguay would have been the best choices and if those countries did not work, countries such as Colombia, Ecuador, Chile, or Paraguay would have been fine substitutions. The match ended 3-0 with Messi scoring one goal, assisting Otamendi's goal, and assisting the final goal. At the end of the match Messi received a gift in the form of a drone show that "recreated the most memorable parts in his life, in the colors of the Argentine flag," however, at the start of the show the drones formed an advertisement of Sancor Seguros (an AFA sponsor) prompting a harsh reaction from much of the Argentine public.

== Personal life ==
Tapia is married to Paola Moyano, daughter of former Secretary General of the CGT, Hugo Moyano. The couple has four children. His sons Iván and Matías are footballers; Matías retired to succeed his father as president of Barracas Central in 2020.
