= 2026 Barracas Central season =

Barracas Central
2026 season
- Manager: Rubén Darío Insúa
- Stadium: Estadio Claudio Chiqui Tapia
- Primera División: Torneo Apertura: 7th

Club Atlético Barracas Central is competing in the 2026 Primera División, its 115th season overall and its fifth consecutive season in the top division. The club is also participating in the Copa Argentina and is making its first-ever appearance in a continental competition, the Copa Sudamericana.

== Transfers ==
=== In ===
Pos.	Player	Transferred from	Fee	Date	Source
FW	(Armenia) Norberto Briasco	(Argentina) Boca Juniors	Loan	16 January 2026	
GK	(Paraguay) Juan Espínola	(Argentina) Newell's Old Boys	Loan	22 January 2026	
MF	(Argentina) Damián Martínez	(Argentina) Atlético Tucumán		18 February 2026	

== Competitions ==
=== Primera División ===
==== Torneo Apertura ====
Pos	Team	Pld	W	D	L	GF	GA	GD	Pts	Qualification
7	Huracán	16	5	7	4	17	13	+4	22	Advance to round of 16
8	Racing	16	5	6	5	17	15	+2	21	Advance to round of 16
9	Barracas Central	16	5	6	5	15	15	0	21	
10	Tigre	16	4	8	4	18	15	+3	20	
11	Sarmiento (J)	16	6	1	9	13	20	−7	19	

Source: AFA

==== Results summary ====
Overall								Home						Away					
Pld	W	D	L	GF	GA	GD	Pts	W	D	L	GF	GA	GD	W	D	L	GF	GA	GD
15	5	6	4	14	13	+1	21	3	2	2	8	6	+2	2	4	2	6	7	−1

==== Matches ====
24 January 2026 1	Barracas	0–1	River Plate
17:00

28 January 2026 2	Aldosivi	0–0	Barracas
17:00

1 February 2026 3	Barracas	1–1	Deportivo Riestra
17:00

9 February 2026 4	Barracas	2–0	Gimnasia y Esgrima
17:00

15 February 2026 5	Rosario Central	2–0	Barracas
22:00

21 February 2026 6	Platense	1–0	Barracas
17:00

25 February 2026 7	Barracas	2–1	Tigre
17:00

1 March 2026 8	Argentinos Juniors	1–1	Barracas
19:15

11 March 2026 10	Independiente Rivadavia	1–2	Barracas
22:00

16 March 2026 11	Barracas	2–1	Atlético Tucumán
15:30

23 March 2026 12	Huracán	0–0	Barracas
21:15

2 April 2026 13	Barracas	1–2	Sarmiento
15:00

11 April 2026 14	Estudiantes de Río Cuarto	1–2	Barracas
21:45

20 April 2026 15	Barracas	0–0	Belgrano
15:00

24 April 2026 16	Racing	1–1	Barracas	Avellaneda
21:30	Fernandez (red card) 6'; Zaracho 30'		Tobio 80'	Stadium: Estadio Presidente Perón; Referee: Pablo Echavarría

=== Copa Argentina ===
5 February 2026	Barracas	2–2 (4–3 p)	Temperley
21:15

=== Copa Sudamericana ===
==== Group stage ====
Group G

Pos	Team	Pld	W	D	L	GF	GA	GD	Pts	Qualification
1	(Brazil) Vasco da Gama	4	2	1	1	6	3	+3	7 (Note: Head-to-head points: Vasco da Gama 3, Olimpia 0.)	Advance to round of 16
2	(Paraguay) Olimpia	4	2	1	1	4	4	0	7	Advance to knockout round play-offs
3	(Chile) Audax Italiano	4	1	1	2	4	6	−2	4	
4	(Argentina) Barracas Central	4	0	3	1	2	3	−1	3	

Updated to match(es) played on 6 May 2026. Source: CONMEBOL
Rules for classification: 1) Points; 2) Head-to-head points; 3) Head-to-head goal difference; 4) Head-to-head goals scored; 5) Goal difference; 6) Goals scored; 7) Red cards; 8) Yellow cards; 9) Drawing of lots.
Notes:

7 April 2026 1	Barracas (Argentina)	0–0	(Brazil) Vasco da Gama
19:00

15 April 2026 2	Olimpia (Paraguay)	0–0	(Argentina) Barracas

28 April 2026 3	Barracas (Argentina)	v	(Chile) Audax Italiano
21:00
