= Kevin Jappert =

Argentine footballer

Personal information
- Full name: Kevin Jhon Jappert
- Date of birth: 25 February 2004 (age 22)
- Place of birth: Ramona, Argentina
- Height: 1.89 m (6 ft 2 in)
- Position: Centre-back

Team information
- Current team: Barracas Central (on loan from Atlético Rafaela)
- Number: 14

Youth career
- Atlético Rafaela

Senior career*
Years	Team	Apps	(Gls)
2022–	Atlético Rafaela	37	(4)
2025–	→ Barracas Central (loan)	44	(4)
- * Club domestic league appearances and goals as of 18:10, 9 September 2026 (UTC)

Kevin Jhon Jappert (born 25 February 2004) is an Argentine professional footballer who plays as a centre-back for Barracas Central, on loan from Atlético Rafaela.

== Career ==
=== Atlético Rafaela ===
Jappert came through the youth setup at Atlético Rafaela, where he made his debut in the Primera Nacional on 29 May 2022 in a 2–2 draw against Mitre. He signed his first professional contract on 15 February 2024. He scored his first goal on 28 April in a 2–1 defeat against San Martín SJ. He established himself in the first team during this season, occasionally taking on the captaincy for some games.

==== Barracas Central (loan) ====
On 18 January 2025, he was loaned to Liga Profesional club Barracas Central for two years for a fee of $600,000. He made his debut on 29 January in a 0–0 draw against Independiente Rivadavia, before scoring his first goal for the club a few days later on 1 February in a 1–0 win against Banfield. Across his first season, he quickly established himself in the team as a regular.

He made his debut in continental competition on 15 April 2026, coming on as a substitute in a 0–0 draw against Paraguayan club Olimpia in the Copa Sudamericana. He scored an own goal as Barracas Central were knocked out of the Copa Argentina in a 3–1 loss to Estudiantes on 27 August.

== Career statistics ==
As of 9 September 2026

Appearances and goals by club, season and competition
Club	Season	League			Cup (Note: Includes Copa Argentina)		Continental		Other		Total	
Club	Season	Division	Goals	Apps	Apps	Goals	Apps	Goals	Apps	Goals	Apps	Goals
Atlético Rafaela	2022	Primera Nacional	1	0	—		—		—		1	0
Atlético Rafaela	2023	Primera Nacional	0	0	—		—		—		0	0
Atlético Rafaela	2024	Primera Nacional	36	4	1	0	—		—		37	4
Atlético Rafaela	Total		37	4	1	0	0	0	0	0	38	4
Barracas Central (loan)	2025	Liga Profesional	27	3	—		—		—		27	3
Barracas Central (loan)	2026	Liga Profesional	17	1	3	0	5 (Note: Appearances in Copa Sudamericana)	0	—		25	1
Barracas Central (loan)	Total		44	4	3	0	5	0	0	0	52	4
Career total			81	8	4	0	5	0	0	0	90	8
