= Juan Mignaburu =

Argentine politician (c. 1870–1940)

Juan Ricardo Mignaburu
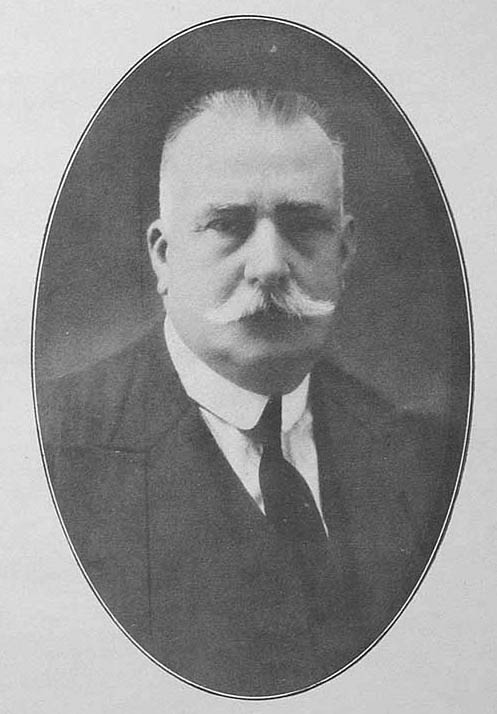

President of the Asociación Amateurs de Football
- In office 1919–1920

Personal details
- Born: c. 1870 Buenos Aires, Argentina
- Died: c. 1940 Buenos Aires, Argentina
- Occupation: Politician
- Profession: Jurist

Juan Mignaburu (c. 1870–1930s) was an Argentine politician, who served as president of the Asociación Amateurs de Football in 1919. He also took care of the management of the Club Atlético Independiente, being his president in 1911–1912, 1917–1918 and 1920–1921.

Mignaburu was also coach of Independiente, in 1912 he directed the final against Club Atlético Porteño.

The Argentine Football Association set a tournament that bears his name and which was played on five occasions between Argentina and Uruguay, with five Argentine triumphs between 1935 and 1943.
