= Gonzalo Morales (footballer) =

Argentine footballer (born 2003)

Personal information
- Full name: Gonzalo Javier Morales
- Date of birth: 4 March 2003 (age 23)
- Place of birth: Córdoba, Argentina
- Height: 1.78 m (5 ft 10 in)
- Position: Centre-forward

Team information
- Current team: Barracas Central (on loan from Boca Juniors)
- Number: 9

Youth career
- Deportivo Atalaya
- 2015–2022: Boca Juniors

Senior career*
Years	Team	Apps	(Gls)
2022–	Boca Juniors	6	(1)
2023–2024	→ Unión Santa Fe (loan)	42	(8)
2025–	→ Barracas Central (loan)	36	(4)
- * Club domestic league appearances and goals as of 17:02, 3 June 2026 (UTC)

Gonzalo Javier Morales (born 4 March 2003) is an Argentine professional footballer who plays as a centre-forward for Barracas Central, on loan from Boca Juniors.

== Career ==
=== Early career ===
Morales played for Deportivo Atalaya at youth level, before coming through the youth setup at Boca Juniors.

=== Boca Juniors ===
He signed his first professional contract at the club in 2021, signing until 2026. On 23 September 2022, he made his debut in a game against Godoy Cruz, coming on as a second-half substitute for Óscar Romero. He made his first start on 28 September against Quilmes in the Copa Argentina, marking it with his first goal. On 2 October, he scored his first league goal in a 1–0 win against Vélez Sarsfield.

==== Loan to Unión Santa Fe ====
On 11 August 2023, he joined fellow Liga Profesional side Unión Santa Fe on an 18-month loan. He scored 9 times in all competitions in his time at Unión.

==== Loan to Barracas Central ====
Upon his return to Boca after his loan at Unión, he was again loaned out on 6 January 2025, this time to Barracas Central. He scored his first goal for the club on 8 March, scoring an equaliser in the 7th minute of second half stoppage time in a 1–1 draw against Sarmiento.

== Career statistics ==
As of 4 March 2026

Appearances and goals by club, season and competition
Club	Season	League			Cup (Note: Includes Copa Argentina)		Continental		Other		Total	
Club	Season	Division	Goals	Apps	Apps	Goals	Apps	Goals	Apps	Goals	Apps	Goals
Boca Juniors	2022	Liga Profesional	5	1	2	1	—		—		7	2
Boca Juniors	2023	Liga Profesional	1	0	1	0	—		—		2	0
Boca Juniors	Total		6	1	3	1	0	0	0	0	9	2
Unión Santa Fe (loan)	2023	Liga Profesional	14	4	—		—		—		14	4
Unión Santa Fe (loan)	2024	Liga Profesional	28	4	1	0	—		—		29	4
Unión Santa Fe (loan)	Total		42	8	1	0	0	0	0	0	43	8
Barracas Central (loan)	2025	Liga Profesional	25	3	1	0	—		—		26	3
Barracas Central (loan)	2026	Liga Profesional	6	0	1	0	—		—		7	0
Barracas Central (loan)	Total		31	3	2	0	0	0	0	0	33	3
Career total			79	12	6	1	0	0	0	0	85	13

== Honours ==
Boca Juniors

- Liga Profesional: 2022
