= Rodrigo Insúa =

Argentine footballer (born 1997)

Personal information
- Full name: Rodrigo Axel Insúa
- Date of birth: 16 December 1997 (age 28)
- Place of birth: Buenos Aires, Argentina
- Height: 1.81 m (5 ft 11 in)
- Positions: Midfielder; left-back

Team information
- Current team: Barracas Central
- Number: 6

Youth career
- Boca Juniors
- 2017–2019: Aldosivi

Senior career*
Years	Team	Apps	(Gls)
2019–2020	Aldosivi	0	(0)
2019–2020	→ Chacarita Juniors (loan)	9	(0)
2020–2022	Chacarita Juniors	27	(2)
2022–2023	Deportivo Riestra	35	(2)
2023–	Barracas Central	115	(11)
- * Club domestic league appearances and goals as of 16:58, 3 June 2026 (UTC)

Rodrigo Axel Insúa (born 16 December 1997) is an Argentine professional footballer who plays as a midfielder or left-back for Barracas Central.

== Career ==
Insúa came through the youth setup at Boca Juniors before being released aged 20. He then joined Aldosivi, for whom he played in the reserves.

He started his professional career with Primera Nacional club Chacarita Juniors, who he joined on loan in August 2019. The following year he signed permanently for the club.

In 2022, he signed for Deportivo Riestra, despite having verbally agreed to join Estudiantes de Río Cuarto after his Chacarita contract expired.

In 2023, he moved up to the Liga Profesional to join Barracas Central. He scored his first goal for Barracas on 11 May 2023 in the Copa Argentina, as he scored a free-kick against Estudiantes de Buenos Aires in the 6th minute of second half of a 1–0 victory. He scored the only goal for Barracas in a 3–1 defeat to Boca Juniors on 27 October 2025, a shot 35 yards after controlling the ball on his chest within the centre circle. On 1 November, he made his 100th appearance in all competitions for Barracas. Insúa scored his, and his team's, first goal of the 2026 season on 1 February, a penalty in the 14th minute of added time to equalise in a 1–1 draw against Deportivo Riestra.

== Personal life ==
He is the son of coach and former footballer Rubén Darío Insúa and his brother, Robertino, is also a footballer.

== Career statistics ==
As of 22 January 2026

Appearances and goals by club, season and competition
Club	Season	League			Cup (Note: Includes Copa Argentina)		Continental		Other		Total	
Club	Season	Division	Goals	Apps	Apps	Goals	Apps	Goals	Apps	Goals	Apps	Goals
Chacarita Juniors (loan)	2019–20	Primera Nacional	9	0	—		—		—		9	0
Chacarita Juniors	2020	Primera Nacional	6	0	—		—		—		6	0
Chacarita Juniors	2021	Primera Nacional	21	2	—		—		—		21	2
Chacarita Juniors	Chacarita Juniors Total		36	2	0	0	0	0	0	0	36	2
Deportivo Riestra	2022	Primera Nacional	35	2	—		—		—		35	2
Barracas Central	2023	AFA Liga Profesional de Fútbol	28	0	2	1	—		—		30	1
Barracas Central	2024	AFA Liga Profesional de Fútbol	40	3	2	0	—		—		42	3
Barracas Central	2025	AFA Liga Profesional de Fútbol	31	5	1	0	—		—		32	5
Barracas Central	Total		99	8	5	1	0	0	0	0	104	9
Career total			170	12	5	1	0	0	0	0	175	13
