= Luis Segura (football administrator) =

Argentinian football administrator

- Known for: Former member of the FIFA Council
- Title: President of the Argentine Football Association (AFA)
- Term: 2014–2016
- Predecessor: Julio Grondona
- Successor: Damián Dupiellet (acting)

Luis Segura is an Argentinian football administrator, and a member of the FIFA Council, the main decision-making body of FIFA, the governing body of association football.

In 2014, Segura succeeded Julio Grondona, who had been in charge from 1979 until his death in 2014, as president of the Argentine Football Association (AFA). Segura remained in post until June 2016, when he was charged with "aggravated administrative fraud". Segura has been replaced on an interim basis by the AFA's executive secretary, Damián Dupiellet.
