= Ignacio Tapia (footballer, born 2004) =

Argentine footballer

Personal information
- Date of birth: 1 September 2004 (age 22)
- Place of birth: Primero de Mayo, Córdoba, Argentina
- Height: 1.68 m (5 ft 6 in)
- Position: Midfielder

Team information
- Current team: Ñublense (on loan from Belgrano)
- Number: 19

Youth career
- 2010–2011: Unión Empalme
- Cultural La Para
- Belgrano La Para
- 2011–2021: Belgrano

Senior career*
Years	Team	Apps	(Gls)
2021–	Belgrano	10	(0)
2025	→ Barracas Central (loan)	9	(1)
2026–	→ Ñublense (loan)	1	(0)

International career
2019	Argentina U15	3	(0)
- * Club domestic league appearances and goals as of 2 February 2026

Ignacio Tapia (born 1 September 2004) is an Argentine footballer who plays as an attacking midfielder for Chilean club Ñublense, on loan from Belgrano.

== Club career ==
Born in Primero de Mayo, Córdoba, Tapia started his career with Unión Empalme at the age of six, before moving to Belgrano a year later. He also spent time with local sides Sociedad Cultural de La Para and Sportivo Belgrano de La Para.

In November 2021, he signed a new three-year contract with Belgrano.

In January 2026, Tapia moved abroad and joined Chilean club Ñublense on a one-year loan.

== Career statistics ==
=== Club ===
As of 21 July 2022.

Club	Season	League			Cup		Other		Total	
Club	Season	Division	Apps	Goals	Apps	Goals	Apps	Goals	Apps	Goals
Belgrano	2021	Primera Nacional	3	0	0	0	0	0	3	0
Belgrano	2022	Primera Nacional	1	0	0	0	0	0	1	0
Career total			4	0	0	0	0	0	4	0
