= Party of Culture, Education and Labour =

Argentine political party

Party of Culture, Education and Labour Partido de la Cultura, la Educación y el Trabajo
- Leader: Hugo Moyano
- Founded: 12 February 2013; 12 years ago
- Split from: Justicialist Party
- Membership (2017): ▼23,345
- Ideology: Peronism; Syndicalism; Labourism
- Political position: Centre-left
- National affiliation: Homeland Force
- Seats in the Chamber of Deputies: 1 / 257
- Seats in the Senate: 0 / 72

The Party of Culture, Education and Labour (Spanish: Partido de la Cultura, la Educación y el Trabajo; CET), also sometimes simply known as the CET Party (Spanish: Partido CET), is a minor Peronist and labourist political party in Argentina founded in 2013 by teamsters' union leader and former Secretary General of the CGT, Hugo Moyano. The party is closely allied with the Justicialist Party, and presently forms part of the Unión por la Patria, the ruling coalition which supported the President Alberto Fernández.

It presently has minimal representation at the federal level, with Hugo Moyano's son, Facundo Moyano, serving in the Argentine Chamber of Deputies since 2011 (and having been a member of CET since its foundation in 2013). Up until 2019, Jorge Taboada, a member of the party, was National Deputy representing Chubut Province. The party also became a part of the Fuerza Patria coalition, and fielded one candidate on its behalf, Hugo Moyano Jr., in the Buenos Aires list for the 2025 Argentine legislative election.

== Ideology ==
The CET was founded by Hugo Moyano, the leader of the "rebel" faction of the General Confederation of Labour, the Truck Drivers' Union (MTA). Moyano was a strong support of the Néstor Kirchner, as well as Cristina Fernández de Kirchner during her first term. In 2009, he became the vice-president of the Justicialist Party in the Buenos Aires Province, and in 2010 he became the president of the party in the province following the resignation of Alberto Balestrini. However, he resigned from his post in 2011 in protest to the Peronist old guard being replaced by members of La Cámpora on the electoral lists for the 2011 Argentine general election. From there, Moyano decided to start an independent political party that would force concessions in favor for trade unionists.

The party is considered Peronist, syndicalist, and labourist. It considers itself a "superior alternative" to Kirchnerism, stating that despite its left-wing narrative, Kirchnerism "has become neoliberal". It seeks to represent "a combative left that is not tainted by the rottenness of the [Kirchnerist] services, that defends class independence and fights for the workers to truly govern." However, the Trotskyist La Izquierda Diario criticized the party representatives for meeting with formerly Menemist and socially conservative politicians. According to the party's founder, Moyano, the party's "intention is to maintain a party that reflects the essence of Peronism, which is the workers. Without them, it would be a liberal party." Moyano became known for criticizing the Kirchnerist governments for what he perceived as fiscal conservatism, "right-wing rhetoric" and failure to live up to the promises of social inclusion. He demanded additional taxes on the financial sector and renationalization of the Banco Hipotecario, arguing that while Kirchnerism renationalized many state-owned companies, it failed to reverse privatization in the banking sector. Despite its criticism of Peronism, ahead of the 2019 election the party joined the Kirchnerist bloc in order to ensure the representation of trade unionists on the Peronist electoral lists.

== Election results ==
=== President ===
Election	Candidate	Coalition	First round		Second round		Result
Election	Candidate	Coalition	Votes	%	Votes	%	Result
2015	Sergio Massa	United for a New Alternative	5,386,977	21.39 (3rd)			✗ Defeated
2019	Alberto Fernández	Frente de Todos	12,473,709	48.10 (1st)	—N/a		✓ Elected

=== Chamber of Deputies ===
Election	Votes	%	Seats won	Total seats	Position	Presidency	Notes
2015	4,115,826	17.6 (#3rd)	2	2 / 257	Minority	Mauricio Macri (PRO—Cambiemos)	within United for a New Alternative
2019	11,359,508	45.50 (#1st)	1	1 / 257	Minority	Alberto Fernández (PJ—FDT)	within Frente de Todos
2021							
2023							
2025							

== See also ==
- Trade unions in Argentina
- General Confederation of Labour (Argentina)
