= Hugo Moyano =

Argentine labour leader (born 1944)

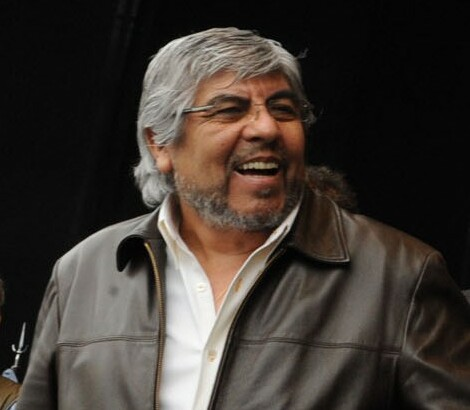

Secretary General of the General Confederation of Labour
- In office July 14, 2004 – August 25, 2016
- Preceded by: Rodolfo Daer
- Succeeded by: Carlos Acuña; Héctor Daer; Juan Carlos Schmid

Provincial Deputy of Buenos Aires
- In office December 10, 1987 – December 9, 1991
- Constituency: Fifth Electoral District

Personal details
- Born: January 9, 1944 (age 82) La Plata, Argentina
- Party: CET Party (since 2013)
- Other political affiliations: Justicialist Party (until 2013)
- Spouse(s): Olga Mariani; Patricia Villares; Liliana Zulet
- Children: Facundo Moyano (son)
- Occupation: Trade union official
- Profession: Trucker
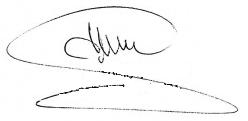
- Signature

Hugo Moyano (born January 9, 1944) is an Argentine labour leader who was secretary general of the CGT, the country's largest trade union, from 2004 to 2012. A schism developed within the CGT during 2012, and Moyano was elected to head the CGT's dissident faction. He was also the president of Club Atlético Independiente, one of the biggest football clubs in the country, and treasurer of the Argentine Football Association. He is the founder and leader of the Party of Culture, Education and Labour (CET).

== Biography ==
=== Early life and career ===
Moyano was born in La Plata in 1944. His family settled in seaside Mar del Plata early in his childhood and he entered the labour force in his teens as an employee of Expresos y Mudanzas, a local moving company. He was elected shop steward in 1962 and soon became a leader in the Mar del Plata local of the Teamsters' Union, a member of the CGT labour federation. He was elected head of the local in 1972. He married three times: to Olga Mariani (with whom he had two sons), to Patricia Villares (four children) and to Liliana Zulet (a daughter). Several of his children are active in trade unionism and politics, such as Pablo Hugo (adjunct secretary of the Teamsters' Union) and Facundo Facundo, a congressman.

Moyano reached an agreement with the right-wing National University Round Table (CNU) to jointly establish the Peronist Union Youth (JSP) in 1973. His entry into politics was made amid fast-growing tensions between the far left and far right fringes of Peronism, shortly after the end of its political banning. A staunch opponent of the Peronist left, he joined the JPRA, a rightist counterpart to the influential, left-wing Peronist Youth (JP). Both the JSP and JPRA maintained close links with José López Rega (head of the Argentine Anticommunist Alliance).

The keystone of Peronist support, the CGT, became one of the targets of the Dirty War following the March 1976 coup, but union activity was banned and thousands of their members "disappeared". Restrictions were later eased and the CGT was reconstituted under the beer workers' leader, Saúl Ubaldini, in 1980. Moyano was named head of the CGT's Mar del Plata delegation and was arrested during numerous demonstrations against the regime's economic policies. After these policies' collapse in 1981 and the loss of the Falklands War the following year, a general election was called for 1983, before which Moyano was named head of the Mar del Plata chapter of the late Juan Perón's Justicialist Party.

=== Trade union leadership ===
Elections at the Buenos Aires Province Teamsters' Union in 1984 resulted in Moyano's promotion to adjunct secretary general and, in 1987, he was elected secretary general of the union. A Peronist sweep in the September 1987 mid-term elections sent Moyano to the Buenos Aires Province Chamber of Deputies.

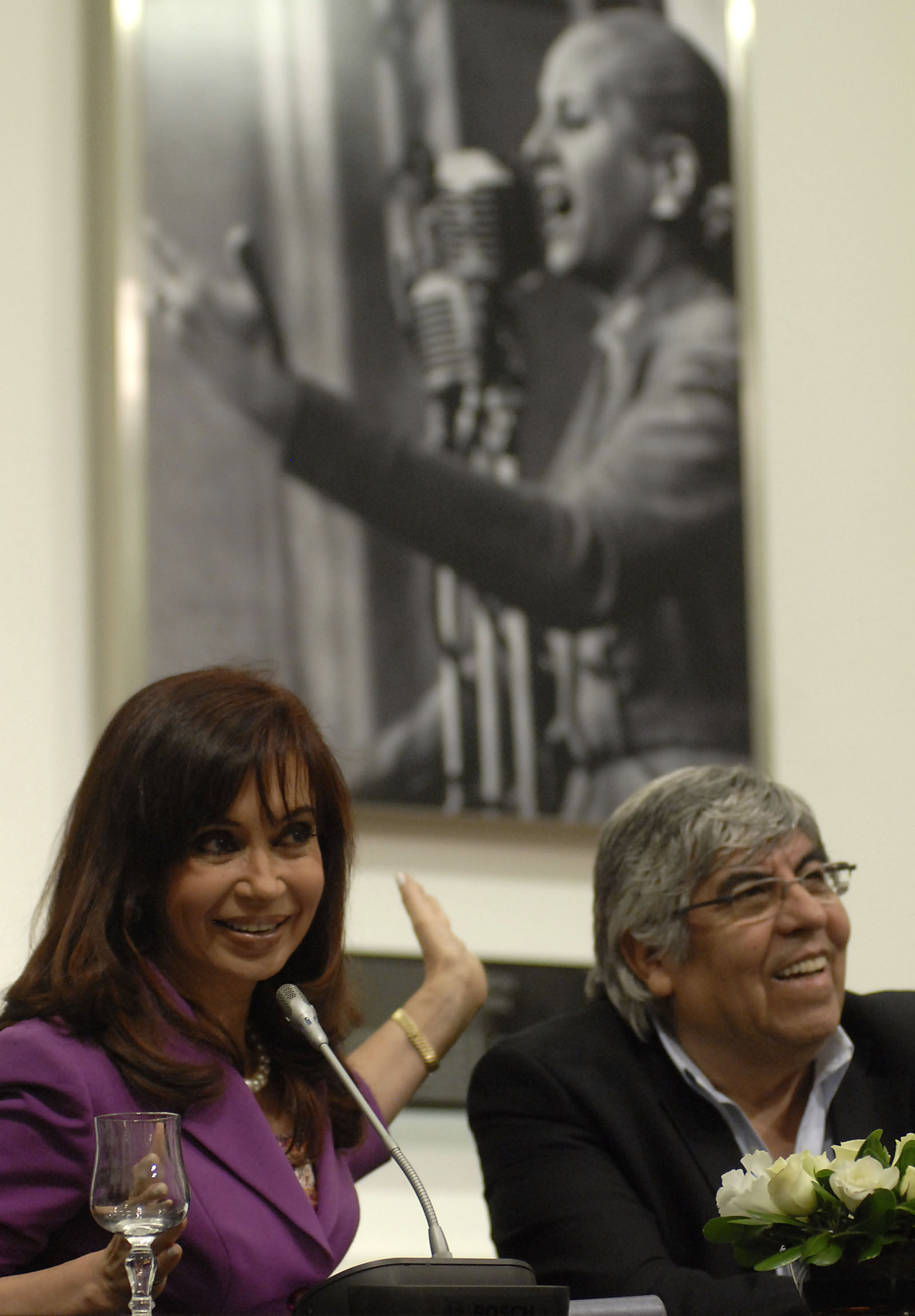
President Cristina Fernández de Kirchner and Hugo Moyano share the stage beneath an image of former First Lady Eva Perón. The alliance of Moyano and Kirchnerism was a centerpiece of Argentine political life during her first term.

He stepped down from his position following his first term in 1991 to assume the speakership of the National Teamsters' Union, and was elected its adjunct secretary general in 1992. He assumed chairmanship of the union's health plan on that occasion and, in April, established the 15 de Diciembre Teamsters' Mutual Association. Like many in the CGT, he became increasingly distanced from President Carlos Menem, who was elected in 1989 as a Peronist and on a populist platform, but had adopted free-market economics since, and by 1995 presided over an unemployment rate of 18% and stagnant wages. The Teamsters' Union helped lead a series of general strikes in 1996, though under the banner of the "Argentine Workers' Movement" (MTA) — a dissenting, intransigent faction within the CGT.

An August 1997 meeting of the Transport Workers' Confederation of the Mercosur Common Market area resulted in Moyano's election as its secretary general. This was followed by a November 1998 election as vice president of the Transport Workers' Section for the Latin America Committee of the International Transport Workers' Federation (ITF), in London.

Apart from shows of force like the 1996 general strikes, however, the CGT's leadership remained generally conciliatory with the anti-labour Menem for the sake of the Justicialist Party, whose defeats in the October 1997 mid-term elections bode poorly for their chances in 1999 (elections they went on to lose). Moyano's rapprochement with the CGT's pragmatic secretary general during the late 1990s, Rodolfo Daer, was again strained in 2000, when President Fernando de la Rúa's plans to make Argentina's labour laws more flexible led to a new schism within the CGT and, in March, Moyano led the MTA as one of two major breakaway unions.

The collapse of de la Rúa's government in late 2001 made way for the parliamentary selection of former Buenos Aires Province governor, Eduardo Duhalde, whose alliance to Moyano helped lead to the gathering of most of the CGT under a trio of Moyano, Susana Rueda of the Nurses' Union and José Luis Lingieri of the Water Works Union. A reunited CGT elected Moyano secretary general in July 2004. Benefiting from a close alliance with the administrations of Néstor and Cristina Kirchner, Moyano leveraged his role as head of the Council on Salaries (an officially sanctioned advisory board) to secure a stronger collective bargaining position and frequent increases in the minimum wage, while opposing restrictive economic policy proposals.

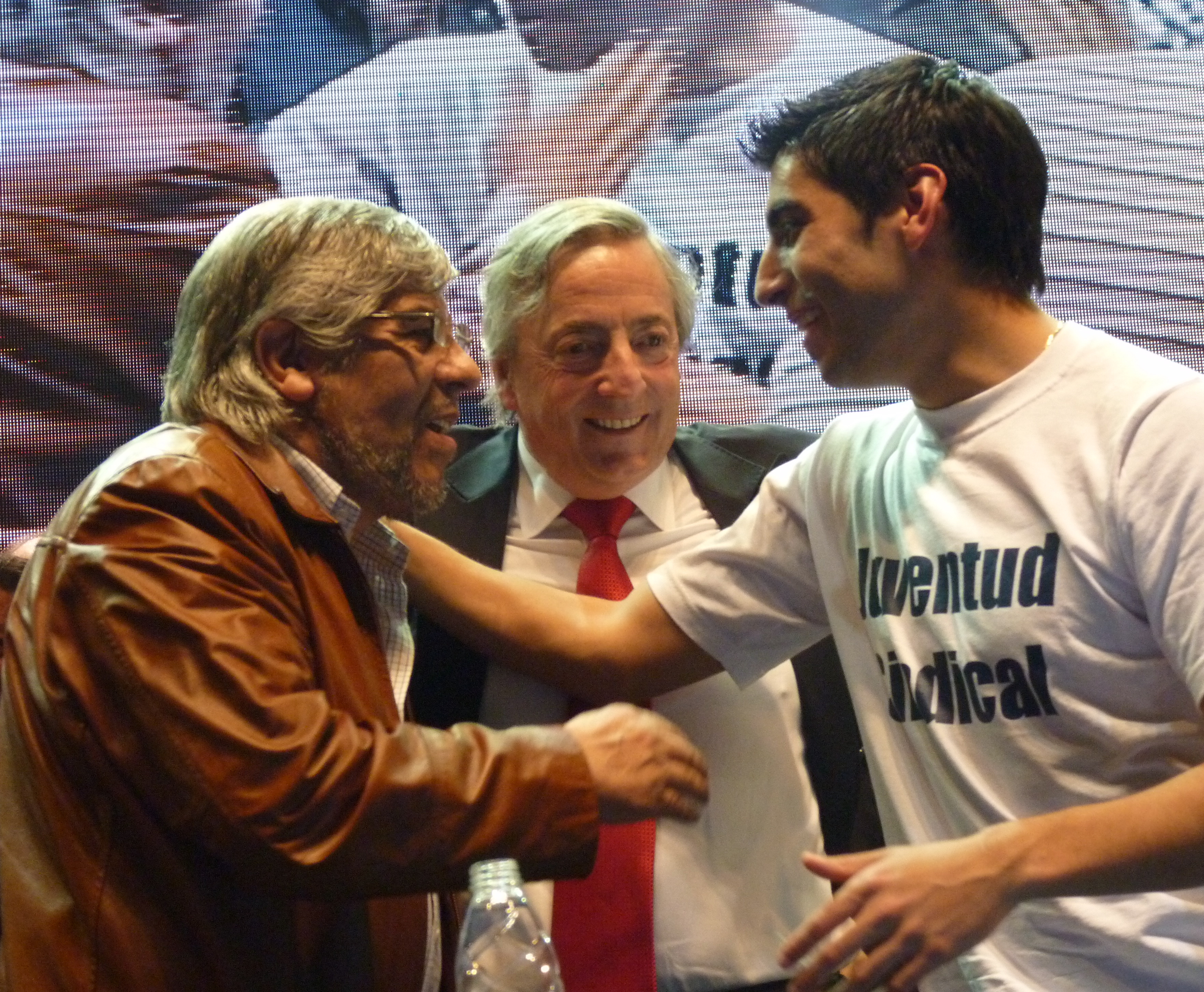
Hugo Moyano with President Néstor Kirchner and his son Facundo Moyano

The labour leader was shaken by the November 2007 murder of Abel Beroiz, the longtime treasurer of the Teamsters' Union and a close adviser of Moyano's. The arrest of his presumptive assassin the following March yielded information of a possible plot against Moyano, and the case remains pending in court. Amid the 2008 Argentine government conflict with the agricultural sector over a planned rise in export taxes, Moyano proposed the creation of a "CGT-TV" and a related radio station. Long-standing differences with the Restaurant Workers' leader, Luis Barrionuevo, led to a new, July 2008, schism within the CGT, whereby Barrionuevo led 40 unions into a "Blue-and-White CGT". Moyano secured his re-election as CGT head, however, and retained the support of 134 unions, including most of the larger ones.

The Teamsters' Union, by then headed by the CGT leader's son Pablo Moyano, staged a blockade of Buenos Aires distribution plants operated by Clarín and La Nación, the nation's two leading newspapers, on November 6, 2009. Relations between the government (allied to Moyano) and the news media had become strained in the preceding months.

Moyano's numerous business interests, as well as those of his wife, Liliana Zulet de Moyano, and other family members, later came under growing media and judicial scrutiny. The prosecutor general of Switzerland, Erwin Beyeler, reportedly requested copies of court files on March 10, 2011, related to money laundering investigations of the Moyanos, and, in response, Moyano threatened to call a general strike. The ambassador of Switzerland to Argentina, Johannes Matyassy, clarified that the Swiss investigation was limited to Ricardo Depresbiteris, proprietor of the Covelia waste transport company, and that no files pertaining to the Moyanos had been requested.

Moyano, his wife, his son Pablo Moyano, and other relatives and associates were later implicated by the Office of Economic Crimes and Money Laundering (PROCELAC) in four cases of racketeering totaling over 570 million pesos (US$100 million) involving Teamster Union accounts and three Moyano family shell corporations located in the same Florida Street address. The cases were formally submitted to prosecutors in September 2013.

Moyano lost his second wife and a son due to health problems during 2011. His support for President Cristina Kirchner dimmed during her reelection campaign, when she refused Moyano's demands to have more CGT officials included in the Front for Victory party list for Congress. He resigned his executive posts within the Justicialist Party, including that of president of the Buenos Aires Province chapter, in February 2012 following a two-year tenure. Moyano's alliance with the Kirchner administration effectively ended with a series of strikes called by the Trucking Workers' Union (led by his son, Pablo) during June 2012. The administration's decision to file legal charges and levy fines against the Truckers' Union for failing to abide by labour dispute mediation requirements, was followed by Moyano's own call for a 10-hour general strike on June 27. This break with the administration caused a schism within the CGT, whereby most of the larger unions rallied behind the Steelworkers' Union (UOM) leader, Antonio Caló, who was elected secretary general of the Official CGT in October 2012 while Moyano continued to lead the now Dissident CGT in a loose alliance with Barrionuevo and Pablo Micheli of the Dissident CTA.

== Personal life ==
Moyano is the father-in-law of Claudio Tapia, president of the Argentine Football Association since 2017. His grandsons, Facundo, Iván and Matías, are footballers.
