= Facundo Moyano =

Argentine trade unionist and politician

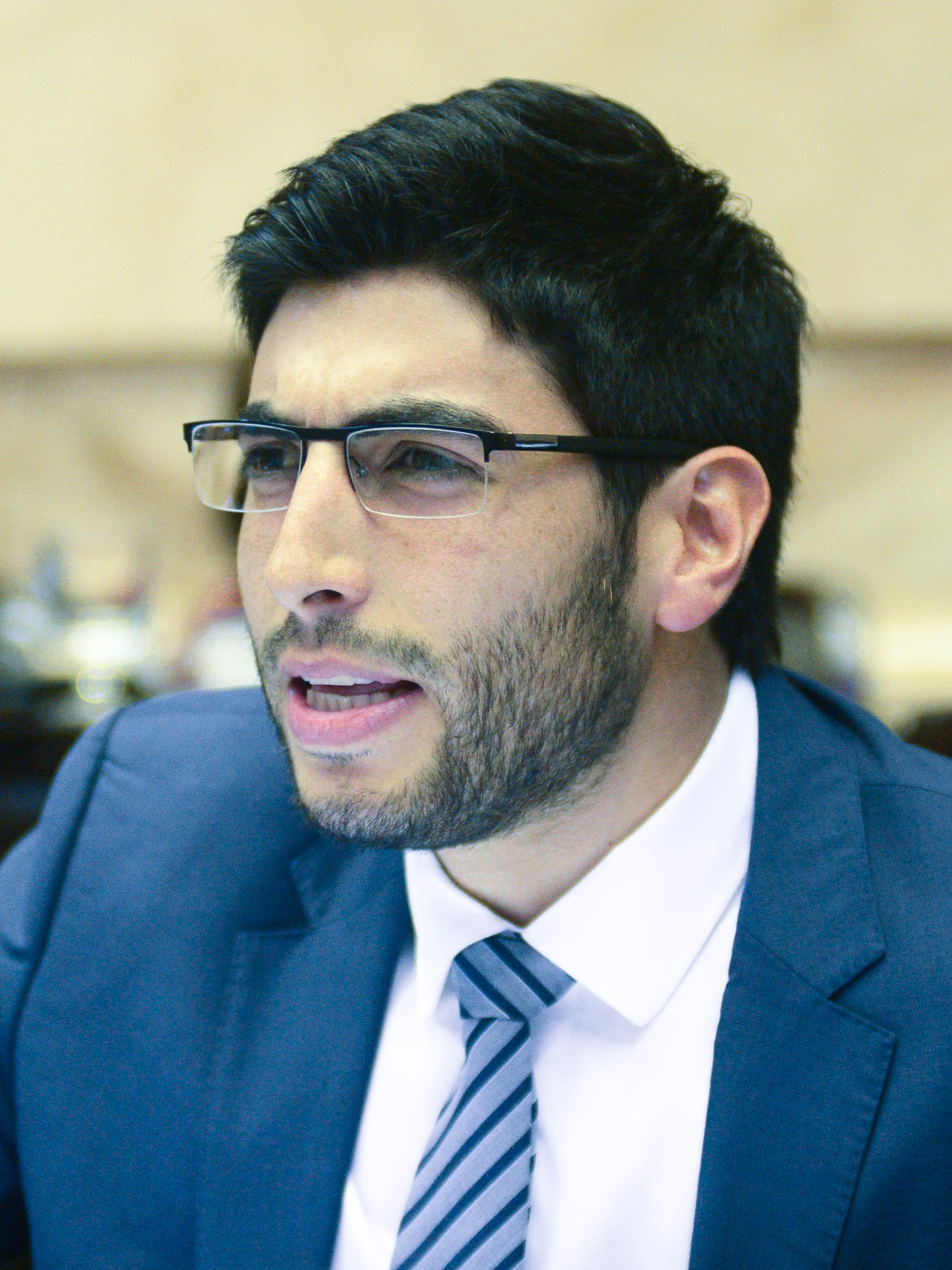
- Moyano in 2014

National Deputy
- In office 4 December 2011 – 12 August 2021
- Constituency: Buenos Aires

Personal details
- Born: 25 December 1984 (age 41) Mar del Plata, Argentina
- Party: Justicialist Party (until 2013); Renewal Front (2013–2018); CET Party (2013–present)
- Other political affiliations: Front for Victory (2011–2013); United for a New Alternative (2015–2017); Frente de Todos (2019–2021)
- Spouse: Eva Bargiela
- Parent: Hugo Moyano (father)

Juan Facundo Moyano (born 25 December 1984) is an Argentine trade unionist and politician. A member of the Party of Culture, Education and Labour (CET), Moyano was a National Deputy for Buenos Aires Province from 2011 to 2021.

From 2009 to 2017, Moyano was Secretary General of the Sindicato Único de Trabajadores de los Peajes y Afines (SUTPA, the toll booth workers' union). Moyano is the son of Hugo Moyano, one of Argentina's most prominent union leaders and former Secretary General of the General Confederation of Labour.

== Early life and education ==
Juan Facundo Moyano was born on 25 December 1984 in Mar del Plata, the fifth of Hugo Moyano's nine children, and the first by his second wife, Elvira Cortés. Hugo Moyano is widely considered to be one of the most prominent union leaders in Argentina, having presided over the Buenos Aires Province Teamsters' Union (Sindicato de Choferes de Camiones de Buenos Aires) since 1987.

He has lived in Buenos Aires since he was 20 years old. He has a degree on Image Assessment and Public Consulting from Universidad Camilo José Cela.

== Career ==
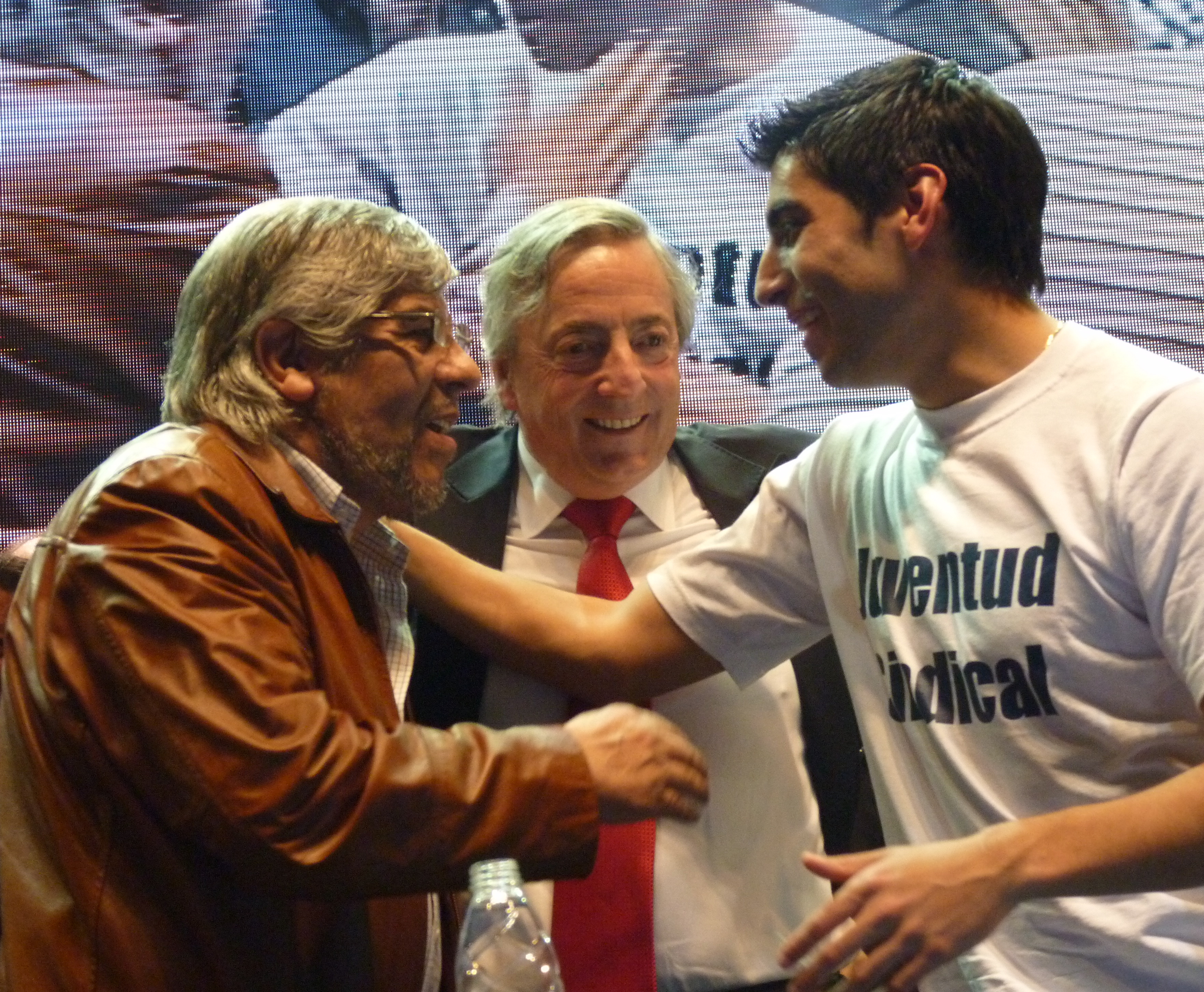
Facundo Moyano with President Néstor Kirchner and his father Hugo Moyano.

Moyano has been active in union politics since 2005. In 2006, he co-founded the Sindicato Único de Trabajadores de los Peajes y Afines (SUTPA), a specialized union for toll booth workers in the Greater Buenos Aires, organized within the General Confederation of Labour (CGT). SUTPA gained major concessions from private contractors in 2007 and 2008. In March 2009, Moyano was elected Secretary General of the union, and was re-elected in 2013, after which the union introduced term limits for the position.

=== National Deputy ===
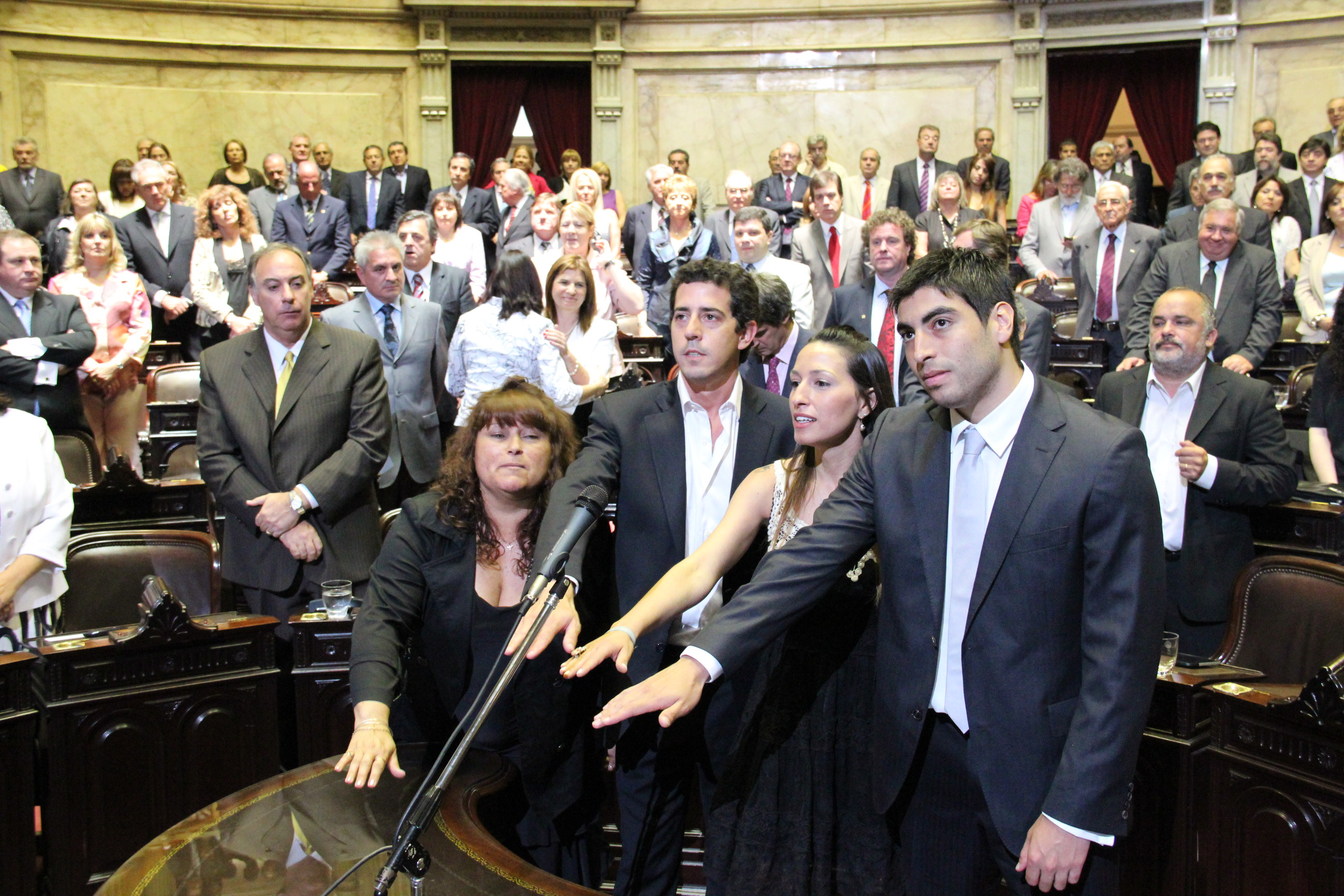
Moyano (to the right) being sworn in as deputy for his first term, in 2011.

Moyano was first elected to the Chamber of Deputies in 2011, as the 11th candidate in the Front for Victory list in Buenos Aires Province. He was elected and sat in the Front for Victory bloc, aligned with the government of then-president Cristina Fernández de Kirchner. By 2012, however, the relationship between the CGT and Fernández de Kirchner's government had deteriorated, and in 2013, Moyano split from the FPV bloc. That year, Hugo Moyano founded the Party of Culture, Education and Labour (CET Party), which Facundo Moyano joined. In the Chamber of Deputies, Moyano formed part of the Renewal Front bloc, led by Sergio Massa.

Ahead of the 2015 legislative election, Moyano was the first deputy candidate in the United for a New Alternative (UNA) list in Buenos Aires Province. The UNA list received 20.98% of the popular vote in Buenos Aires Province, and Moyano was re-elected. In 2018, Moyano and a group of deputies broke ranks with the Renewal Front and formed the Red por Argentina parliamentary bloc. Before the 2019 general election, the CET Party, alongside the entirety of the CGT, joined forces with other Peronist political groups and formed the Frente de Todos (FDT) to back the presidential candidacy of Alberto Fernández. Moyano was the eleventh candidate in the FDT deputies list in Buenos Aires Province, which received 51.64% of the vote, allowing for Moyano to be re-elected.

As deputy, Moyano introduced legislation on labour affairs and on transport. In 2020, he introduced a bill to reduce the legal alcohol levels for drivers to 0. For the 2019–2023 term, Moyano was part of the parliamentary commissions on Science and Technology, Sports, Population and Human Development, Industry, Labour Legislation, and Transport. He was a vocal supporter of the legalization of abortion in Argentina, voting in favour of the two Voluntary Interruption of Pregnancy bills that were debated by the Argentine Congress in 2018 and 2020.

Moyano resigned from his seat in the Chamber of Deputies on 12 August 2021.

== Personal life ==
Moyano's romantic life has been subject to media scrutiny. He has been intermittently linked to models Nicole Neumann and Eva Bargiela. On 15 October 2021, Moyano and Bargiela married in a private ceremony in Palermo, Buenos Aires.

In March 2021, during the COVID-19 pandemic in Argentina, Moyano stated that he would not get the vaccine, and called COVID-19 a "very psychosomatic, very strange disease". He would later apologize and retract his statements. Moyano had previously tested positive for COVID-19.

== Electoral history ==
Electoral history of Facundo Moyano
Election	Office	List	#	District	Votes			Result	Ref.
Election	Office	List	#	District	Total	%	P.	Result	Ref.
2011	National Deputy	Front for Victory	11	Buenos Aires Province	4,592,054	57.10%	1st (Note: Presented on an electoral list. The data shown represents the share of the vote the entire party/alliance received in that constituency.)	Elected	
2015	National Deputy	United for a New Alternative	1	Buenos Aires Province	1,888,415	20.98%	3rd	Elected	
2019	National Deputy	Frente de Todos	11	Buenos Aires Province	5,113,359	52.64%	1st	Elected	
