= Facundo Bruera =

Argentine professional footballer

Personal information
- Date of birth: 23 September 1998 (age 28)
- Place of birth: La Plata, Argentina
- Height: 1.93 m (6 ft 4 in)
- Position: Forward

Team information
- Current team: Barracas Central (on loan from San Lorenzo)
- Number: 77

Youth career
- Estudiantes

Senior career*
Years	Team	Apps	(Gls)
2017–2018	Estudiantes	0	(0)
2017–2018	→ Independiente Rivadavia (loan)	3	(0)
2018–2020	Quilmes	19	(2)
2020–2023	Brown de Adrogué	39	(16)
2022	→ Nacional (loan)	42	(19)
2023–2024	Olimpia	43	(12)
2024–	San Lorenzo	1	(0)
2024–2026	→ Barracas Central (loan)	60	(14)
2026–	→ Barracas Central (loan)	1	(0)
- * Club domestic league appearances and goals as of 18:13, 3 August 2026 (UTC)

Facundo Bruera (born 23 September 1998) is an Argentine professional footballer who plays as a forward for Barracas Central, on loan from San Lorenzo.

== Career ==
=== Club ===
Bruera began his career with Estudiantes of the Argentine Primera División. In August 2017, Bruera signed his first professional contract with Estudiantes and was immediately loaned out to Primera B Nacional side Independiente Rivadavia. His senior debut came on 5 November 2017 as Independiente Rivadavia drew 2–2 with Flandria. Quilmes completed the signing of Bruera in August 2018.

=== International ===
Bruera was called up to train with the Argentina U20 team ahead of the 2016 COTIF Tournament, but he wasn't selected for the final squad by manager Ariel Paolorossi.

== Career statistics ==
As of 12 May 2025.

Club statistics
Club	Division	League			Cup		Continental		Total	
Club	Division	Season	Apps	Goals	Apps	Goals	Apps	Goals	Apps	Goals
Independiente Rivadavia	Primera B Nacional	2017-18	3	0	—		—		3	0
Quilmes	Primera B Nacional	2018-19	7	1	—		—		7	1
Quilmes	Primera B Nacional	2019-20	12	1	—		—		12	1
Quilmes	Total		19	2	0	0	0	0	19	2
Brown de Adrogué	Primera B Nacional	2020	5	0	—		—		5	0
Brown de Adrogué	Primera B Nacional	2021	32	16	—		—		32	16
Brown de Adrogué	Total		39	16	0	0	0	0	37	16
Nacional	Paraguayan Primera División	A-2022	21	12	—		2	0	23	12
Nacional	Paraguayan Primera División	C-2022	20	7	3	3	—		23	10
Nacional	Total		41	19	3	3	2	0	46	22
Olimpia	Paraguayan Primera División	A-2023	16	4	0	0	3	1	19	5
Olimpia	Paraguayan Primera División	C-2023	11	3	1	0	2	1	14	4
Olimpia	Paraguayan Primera División	A-2024	12	5	0	0	0	0	12	5
Olimpia	Total		39	12	1	0	5	2	45	14
San Lorenzo	Argentine Primera División	2024	1	0	1	0	1	0	3	0
Barracas Central	Argentine Primera División	2024	11	3	—		—		11	3
Barracas Central	Argentine Primera División	2025	16	5	1	0	—		17	5
Barracas Central	Total		27	8	1	0	0	0	28	8
Career total			169	57	6	3	8	2	183	62
