= Facundo Mater =

Syrian footballer (born 1998)

Facundo Mater فاكوندو مطر
Personal information
- Full name: Facundo Leonel Mater
- Date of birth: 23 July 1998 (age 28)
- Place of birth: Buenos Aires, Argentina
- Height: 1.65 m (5 ft 5 in)
- Position: Midfielder

Team information
- Current team: Universidad de Concepción (on loan from Barracas Central)
- Number: 9

Youth career
- Nueva Chicago

Senior career*
Years	Team	Apps	(Gls)
2016–2020	Nueva Chicago	55	(1)
2020–2025	Argentinos Juniors	3	(0)
2021	→ Almirante Brown (loan)	17	(0)
2022–2025	→ Barracas Central (loan)	124	(5)
2026–	Barracas Central	0	(0)
2026–	→ Universidad de Concepción (loan)	1	(0)

International career^{‡}
2024–	Syria	1	(0)
- * Club domestic league appearances and goals as of 1 February 2026 ‡ National team caps and goals as of 19:37, 19 November 2024 (UTC)

Facundo Leonel Mater (Arabic: فاكوندو ليونيل مطر; born 23 July 1998) is a professional footballer who plays as a midfielder for Chilean club Universidad de Concepción on loan from Barracas Central. Born in Argentina, he represents Syria at international level.

== Club career ==
Mater's senior career began in June 2016 with Nueva Chicago, when he was an unused substitute for a Primera B Nacional encounter with Los Andes. He made his professional football debut during the 2016–17 season in a game against Argentinos Juniors, which preceded further appearances that season versus Instituto, Chacarita Juniors and San Martín. Mater was selected seventeen more times in 2017–18.

Ended his contract with Argentinos Juniors in 2025, Mater signed with Barracas Central and was loaned out to Chilean club Universidad de Concepción in January 2026.

== International career ==
On 19 November 2024, Mater made his international debut for Syria in a 4–0 friendly loss to Russia.

== Career statistics ==
As of 26 February 2019.

Appearances and goals by club, season and competition
Club	Season	League			Cup		Continental		Other		Total	
Club	Season	Division	Apps	Goals	Apps	Goals	Apps	Goals	Apps	Goals	Apps	Goals
Nueva Chicago	2016	Primera B Nacional	0	0	0	0	—		0	0	0	0
Nueva Chicago	2016–17	Primera B Nacional	4	0	0	0	—		0	0	4	0
Nueva Chicago	2017–18	Primera B Nacional	17	0	0	0	—		0	0	17	0
Nueva Chicago	2018–19	Primera B Nacional	11	0	0	0	—		0	0	11	0
Career total			32	0	0	0	—		0	0	32	0
