= Matías Tapia =

Argentine professional footballer

Personal information
- Full name: Matías Fabián Tapia
- Date of birth: 26 January 1996 (age 30)
- Place of birth: Buenos Aires, Argentina
- Position: Centre-back

Team information
- Current team: Barracas Central (president)

Youth career
- Barracas Central

Senior career*
Years	Team	Apps	(Gls)
2019	Barracas Central	4	(0)
- * Club domestic league appearances and goals

Matías Fabián Tapia (born 26 January 1996) is an Argentine former professional footballer who played as a centre-back.

== Playing career ==
Tapia is a product of Barracas Central's youth ranks. Salvador Daniele selected Tapia for his professional debut on 22 February 2019, as the defender came off the substitutes bench in a 6–0 victory over Comunicaciones in Primera B Metropolitana; as he played alongside his brother. Another appearance came two months later in the Copa Argentina against Unión Santa Fe. They won promotion at the end of his first season. On 5 December 2019, a 23-year old Tapia announced his retirement from professional football after just five senior appearances.

== Post-playing career ==
In March 2020, Tapia became president of Barracas Central; aged 24.

== Personal life ==
Tapia's brother, Iván, also plays football professionally. They are the sons of Claudio Tapia and grandsons of Hugo Moyano. Their cousin, Facundo Moyano, is also a footballer.

== Career statistics ==
As of 23 October 2020.

Appearances and goals by club, season and competition
Club	Season	League			Cup		League Cup		Continental		Other		Total	
Club	Season	Division	Apps	Goals	Apps	Goals	Apps	Goals	Apps	Goals	Apps	Goals	Apps	Goals
Barracas Central	2018–19	Primera B Metropolitana	2	0	1	0	—		—		0	0	3	0
Barracas Central	2019–20	Primera B Nacional	2	0	0	0	—		—		0	0	2	0
Career total			4	0	1	0	—		—		0	0	5	0

== Honours ==
Barracas Central

- Primera B Metropolitana: 2018–19
