= Iván Tapia =

Argentine professional footballer

Personal information
- Date of birth: 23 November 1998 (age 27)
- Place of birth: Buenos Aires, Argentina
- Positions: Attacking midfielder; winger

Team information
- Current team: Barracas Central
- Number: 10

Youth career
- Barracas Central

Senior career*
Years	Team	Apps	(Gls)
2015–2024	Barracas Central	191	(24)
2024	San Lorenzo	5	(0)
2024–	Barracas Central	67	(3)
- * Club domestic league appearances and goals as of 17:02, 3 June 2026 (UTC)

Iván Tapia (born 23 November 1998) is an Argentine professional footballer who plays as an attacking midfielder for Barracas Central. He is the son of Claudio Tapia.

== Career ==
Tapia started his career with Barracas Central. He appeared for his senior bow in the 2015 Primera B Metropolitana under manager Marcelo Barrera, coming off the bench at the interval of a 5–4 victory over Deportivo Riestra on 14 November. No appearances followed in the subsequent 2016 season, though he returned in 2016–17 to play fourteen times. Tapia scored his first goal in a 2–2 draw with Defensores de Belgrano in April 2018, with another arriving in February 2019 against Comunicaciones; a match his brother also participated in.

== Personal life ==
Tapia's brother Matías and father Claudio also played football professionally for Barracas Central. His grandfather Hugo Moyano and cousin Facundo Moyano also have a footballing background.

== Career statistics ==
As of 18 April 2023.

Appearances and goals by club, season and competition
Club	Season	League			Cup		League Cup		Continental		Other		Total	
Club	Season	Division	Apps	Goals	Apps	Goals	Apps	Goals	Apps	Goals	Apps	Goals	Apps	Goals
Barracas Central	2015	Primera B	1	0	0	0	—		—		0	0	1	0
Barracas Central	2016–17	Primera B	14	0	0	0	—		—		0	0	14	0
Barracas Central	2017–18	Primera B	10	1	0	0	—		—		0	0	10	1
Barracas Central	2018–19	Primera B	21	3	0	0	—		—		0	0	21	3
Barracas Central	2019–20	Primera Nacional	20	1	1	0	—		—		0	0	21	1
Barracas Central	2020	Primera Nacional	8	1	0	0	—		—		0	0	8	1
Barracas Central	2021	Primera Nacional	36	5	0	0	—		—		0	0	36	5
Barracas Central	2022	Primera División	40	7	2	0	—		—		0	0	42	7
Barracas Central	2023	Primera División	12	1	0	0	—		—		0	0	12	1
Career total			162	19	3	1	—		—		0	0	165	20

== Honours ==
Barracas Central

- Primera B Metropolitana: 2018–19
