= Jhonatan Candia =

Uruguayan footballer (born 1995)

Personal information
- Full name: Jhonatan Marcelo Candia Hernández
- Date of birth: 15 March 1995 (age 31)
- Place of birth: Montevideo, Uruguay
- Height: 1.71 m (5 ft 7 in)
- Position: Forward

Team information
- Current team: Barracas Central
- Number: 20

Youth career
- Liverpool Montevideo

Senior career*
| Years | Team | Apps | (Gls) |
| 2013–2018 | Liverpool Montevideo | 45 | (5) |
| 2018–2019 | Boston River | 7 | (0) |
| 2019–2020 | Villa Española | 22 | (10) |
| 2020–2021 | Arsenal de Sarandí | 20 | (6) |
| 2021–2022 | Huracán | 43 | (8) |
| 2022–2024 | Rosario Central | 21 | (1) |
| 2023 | → Audax Italiano (loan) | 10 | (0) |
| 2024– | Barracas Central | 70 | (11) |

International career
| 2014 | Uruguay U20 | 2 | (0) |
- * Club domestic league appearances and goals as of 17:05, 3 June 2026 (UTC)

Jhonatan Marcelo Candia Hernández (born 15 March 1995) is an Uruguayan professional footballer who plays as a forward for Barracas Central.

== Professional career ==
Candia made his professional debut with Liverpool Montevideo in a 1-1 Uruguayan Primera División tie with Central Español on 6 April 2013.

== International career ==
Candia represented the Uruguay U20s in 2014.

== Honours ==
Liverpool Montevideo;

- Uruguayan Segunda División: 2014-15
