= Marcelo Miño =

Argentine footballer

Personal information
- Full name: Marcelo Agustín Miño
- Date of birth: 21 August 1997 (age 29)
- Place of birth: Guatimozín, Argentina
- Height: 1.86 m (6 ft 1 in)
- Position: Goalkeeper

Team information
- Current team: Barracas Central
- Number: 30

Youth career
- Atlético Guatimozín
- Arias Foot Ball Club
- Vélez Sarsfield
- Rosario Central

Senior career*
Years	Team	Apps	(Gls)
2018–2022	Rosario Central	8	(0)
2021–2022	→ Ferro (loan)	70	(0)
2023–2026	Ferro	15	(0)
2024–2025	→ Barracas Central (loan)	15	(0)
2026–	Barracas Central	11	(0)

International career
2017	Argentina U20	1	(0)
- * Club domestic league appearances and goals as of 17:08, 3 June 2026 (UTC)

Marcelo Agustín Miño (born 21 August 1997) is an Argentine professional footballer who plays as a goalkeeper for Barracas Central.

== Career ==
=== Club ===
Atlético Guatimozín and Arias Foot Ball Club were youth teams of Miño, prior to him signing with Vélez Sarsfield and subsequently Rosario Central. He was first chosen in a senior matchday squad in April 2018, when manager Leonardo Fernández selected the goalkeeper on the substitutes bench for an Argentine Primera División victory over Patronato. After his breakthrough in 2017–18, Miño made his professional debut in 2018–19 during a fixture with former club Vélez Sarsfield on 3 December 2018.

On 11 March 2021, Miño joined Primera Nacional club Ferro Carril Oeste on a loan deal for the rest of 2022. On 6 January 2022, the loan spell was extended for one further year. On 12 September he joined the club on a permanent basis.

On 8 January 2024, Miño joined Barracas Central on loan until the end of the season, with an option to buy. In January 2025, Ferro announced that he had rescinded his contract with club and that he was signing with Barracas until the end of the season.

=== International ===
Miño represented Argentina at the 2017 FIFA U-20 World Cup in South Korea; winning one cap in his nation's final Group A match against Guinea on 26 May.

== Career statistics ==
As of 13 March 2026.

Appearances and goals by club, season and competition
Club	Season	League			Cup		League Cup		Total	
Club	Season	Division	Apps	Goals	Apps	Goals	Apps	Goals	Apps	Goals
Rosario Central	2017–18	Primera División	0	0	0	0	—		0	0
Rosario Central	2018–19	Primera División	1	0	0	0	—		1	0
Rosario Central	2020–21	Primera División	0	0	0	0	7	0	7	0
Rosario Central	Total		1	0	0	0	7	0	8	0
Ferro (loan)	2021	Primera División	35	0	0	0	—		35	0
Ferro (loan)	2022	Primera División	35	0	1	0	—		36	0
Ferro	2023	Primera División	15	0	0	0	—		15	0
Ferro	Total		85	0	1	0	0	0	86	0
Barracas Central (loan)	2024	Primera División	10	0	1	0	—		11	0
Barracas Central	2025	Primera División	5	0	0	0	—		5	0
Barracas Central	2026	Primera División	9	0	0	0	—		9	0
Barracas Central	Total		24	0	1	0	0	0	25	0
Career total			110	0	2	0	7	0	119	0
