= Siro Rosane =

Argentine professional footballer

Personal information
- Full name: Siro Ignacio Rosane
- Birth name: Siro Cabral
- Date of birth: 7 June 2000 (age 26)
- Place of birth: Río Cuarto, Argentina
- Height: 1.77 m (5 ft 10 in)
- Position: Midfielder

Team information
- Current team: Estudiantes RC (on loan from Barracas Central)
- Number: 8

Youth career
- Estudiantes RC
- 2016–2020: San Lorenzo

Senior career*
| Years | Team | Apps | (Gls) |
| 2020–2023 | San Lorenzo | 35 | (1) |
| 2023– | Barracas Central | 80 | (1) |
| 2026– | → Estudiantes RC (loan) | 26 | (0) |
- * Club domestic league appearances and goals as of 17:44, 8 November 2026 (UTC)

Siro Ignacio Cabral Rosané (born 7 June 2000) is an Argentine professional footballer who plays as a midfielder for Estudiantes RC, on loan from Barracas Central.

== Career ==
Rosane joined the youth ranks of San Lorenzo from hometown club Estudiantes in 2016. He was moved into the first-team squad of manager Diego Dabove in 2020, notably training and featuring in friendly matches. At the end of the year, Rosane was an unused substitute for six matches in the 2020 Copa de la Liga Profesional. He signed his first professional contract on 14 January 2021. Just over a month later, Rosane made his senior debut during a Copa Argentina round of sixty-four victory at the Estadio José María Minella against Primera D Metropolitana outfit Liniers; he replaced Manuel Insaurralde after eleven minutes.

== Style of play ==
Rosane is a central midfielder, though has youth experience of playing as a defensive midfielder.

== Personal life ==
Rosane was born as Siro Cabral, though later changed his name to Siro Rosane - Cabral belongs to his father, who abandoned the family, while Rosane was his mother's surname. Following the passing of his mother, Paola, via a motorcycle accident, Rosane spent the later years of adolescence living with grandfather and former professional footballer Carlos. His uncle, Nelson, also played pro football. Rosane has two footballing brothers in Gino and Vito, who play as a left winger and goalkeeper respectively. In January 2021, it was confirmed that Rosane had tested positive for COVID-19 amid the pandemic.

== Career statistics ==
As of 19 February 2021.

Appearances and goals by club, season and competition
| Club | Season | League | | | Cup | | League Cup | | Continental | | Other | | Total | |
| Club | Season | Division | Apps | Goals | Apps | Goals | Apps | Goals | Apps | Goals | Apps | Goals | Apps | Goals |
|---|---|---|---|---|---|---|---|---|---|---|---|---|---|---|
| San Lorenzo | 2020–21 (Note: Soccerway counts 2020 Copa de la Liga Profesional appearances as league appearances.) | Primera División | 0 | 0 | 0 | 0 | 0 | 0 | — | | 0 | 0 | 0 | 0 |
| San Lorenzo | 2021 (Note: Soccerway counts 2021 Copa de la Liga Profesional appearances as league appearances.) | Primera División | 0 | 0 | 1 | 0 | — | | 0 | 0 | 0 | 0 | 1 | 0 |
| Career total | | | 0 | 0 | 1 | 0 | 0 | 0 | 0 | 0 | 0 | 0 | 1 | 0 |
