= Julio Grondona =

Argentine football executive (1931–2014)

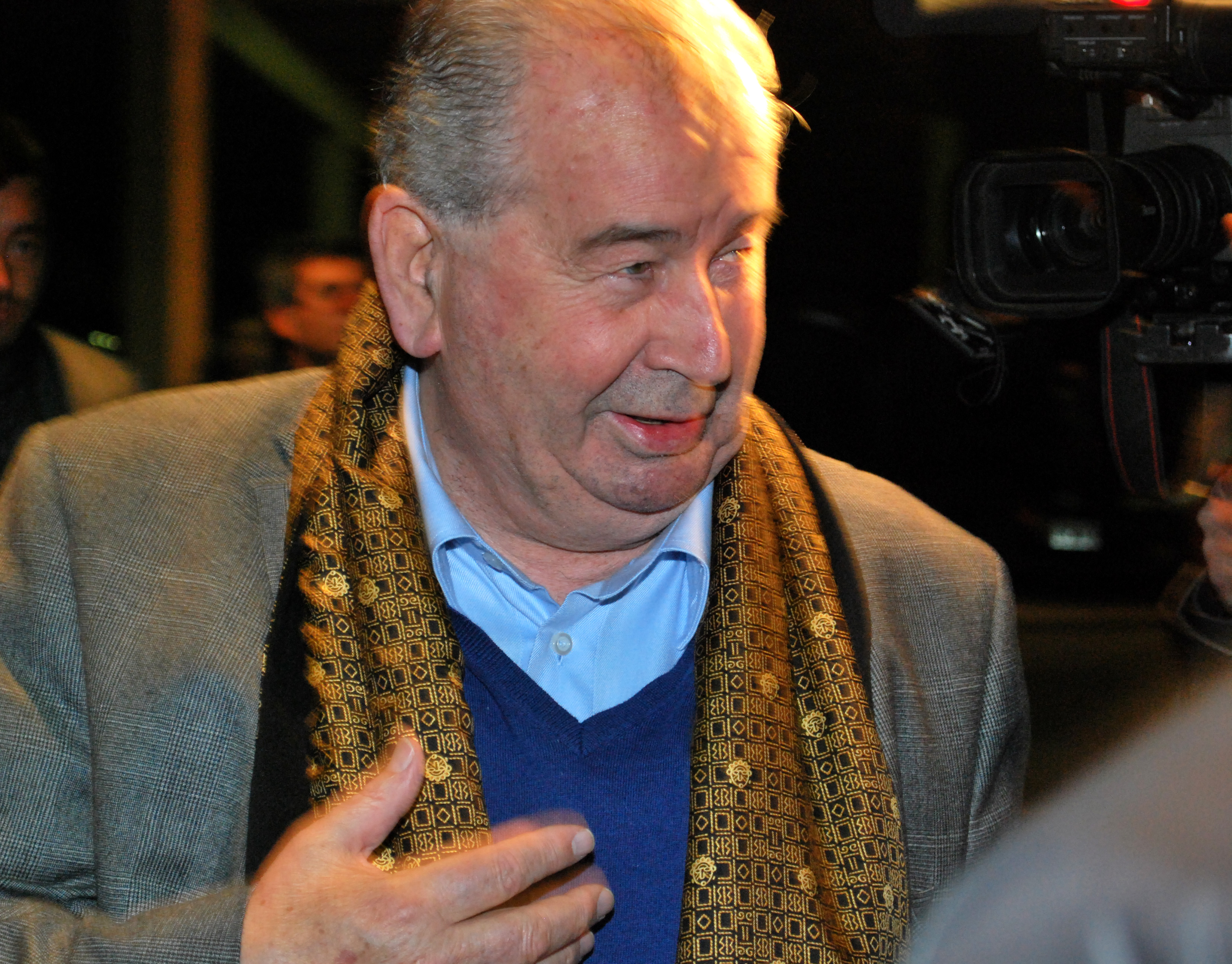
- Grondona in 2009.
- Born: Julio Humberto Grondona; 18 September 1931; Avellaneda, Argentina
- Died: 30 July 2014 (aged 82); Buenos Aires, Argentina
- Occupations: Chairman of AFA (1979–2014); Vice-President of FIFA (1988–2014)

Julio Humberto Grondona (18 September 1931 – 30 July 2014) was an Argentine football executive. He served as president of the Argentine Football Association (Asociación del Fútbol Argentino) from 1979 until his death in 2014. He also served as Senior Vice-President of FIFA (Fédération Internationale de Football Association).

== Biography ==
=== Arsenal Fútbol Club ===
Julio Grondona's career in football began in 1956, when he and his brother Héctor founded Arsenal Fútbol Club, inspired by the homonymous English side, in Sarandí, Avellaneda, Buenos Aires. The team's colours, light blue and red, were chosen because of two different reasons. The light blue represents the sky and the red stripe, is in honor to Julio's grandfather, who was a fan of River Plate.

Grondona was president of the club for nearly twenty years, from 1957 to 1976, when he was elected president of Club Atlético Independiente. Under his leadership the club was promoted from the lowest rank in the Argentine football league system, the Primera D, in 1962 and once again in 1964, when the team won the Primera C title.

=== Club Atlético Independiente ===
While holding the Arsenal de Sarandi presidency, he also held positions in neighboring club Independiente, where he was elected as chair of the professional football subcommittee in 1962. While he was in that role, the team won the 1963 Argentine Primera División, the Copa Libertadores in 1964 and 1965 and the Campeonato Nacional in 1967.

In 1970 his Lista Roja lost the club's elections, and he left the club until his return as president in 1976, when he defeated the ruling José Epelbóim in the elections. Under Grondona, Independiente won the 1977 Campeonato Nacional in Córdoba against locals Talleres with eight players on the pitch, and the 1978 Campeonato Nacional, beating River Plate in the final.

=== Argentine Football Association ===
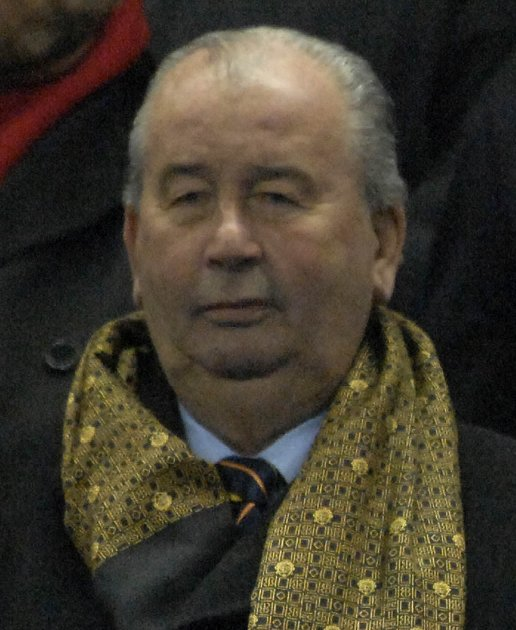
Grondona in 2007.

In 1979 Grondona was elected to succeed Huracán's David Bracuto as head of the Argentine Football Association, immediately after Argentina's 1978 FIFA World Cup win.

During his tenure Argentina reached three World Cup finals (all of them against Germany, winning in 1986 and losing in 1990 and 2014), three Olympic finals (obtaining the silver medal in Atlanta 1996 and gold in Athens 2004 and Beijing 2008) and won six FIFA U-20 World Cups (1979, 1995, 1997, 2001, 2005 and 2007).

=== Death ===
Grondona died of an aortic aneurysm at the age of 82 on 30 July 2014 at Buenos Aires, Argentina

== Controversy ==
Grondona caused controversy in 2003 when, in response to a journalist's question about referee standards in Argentina, he said: "I do not believe a Jew can ever be a referee at this level. It's hard work and you know, Jews don't like hard work." In another incident, he went on record saying "Jews don't like it when it gets rough."

On 31 May 2011, in an interview with German press, when asked about who he voted for to receive the 2018 and 2030 World Cup hosting rights Grondona said, "Yes, I voted for Argentina, because a vote for the US would be like a vote for England, and that is not possible [...] But with the English bid I said: Let us be brief. If you give back the Islas Malvinas (Falkland Islands), which belong to us, you will get my vote. They then became sad and left." Grondona later apologized for his attack on England.

In 2014 his son, Humberto, a FIFA official, admitted illegally selling tickets for games at the World Cup in Brazil.

On 2 June 2015, FIFA blamed Julio Grondona for approving, in 2007, corrupt payments at the centre of the United States Department of Justice investigation known as FIFA-gate that led to the 47-count indictment against football officials and sports marketing executives.

== In popular culture ==
Luis Margani portrayed Grondona in the 2020 Amazon Prime Video original series El Presidente.

== See also ==
- Estadio Julio H. Grondona
