= Barracas Central =

Association football club in Argentina

- Full name: Club Atlético Barracas Central
- Nicknames: Baraqueños; Guapo; Los Camioneros; La Malla Enteriza
- Founded: 5 April 1904; 122 years ago
- Ground: Estadio Claudio Fabián Tapia
- Capacity: 12,000
- Chairman: Matías Tapia
- Manager: Damián Ayude
- League: Primera División
- 2024: 28th
- Website: barracascentral.com
Home colours	Away colours	Third colours

Club Atlético Barracas Central is an Argentine professional football club from the district of Barracas, Buenos Aires. Established in 1904, Barracas Central returned to the Primera División, the top level of the Argentine football league system, in the 2022 season after the team won the Torneo Reducido.

The club play their home matches at Estadio Claudio Chiqui Tapia, with capacity for 12,000 spectators.

== History ==
=== Foundation and early years ===
Felipe Cámpora, a truck driver, founded Club Atlético Barracas Central on 5 April 1904 under the name "Barracas Central del Sud”. Cámpora carried out the project and became the first president of the entity. During the early years of the club's foundation, the founders would each contribute 75¢ cents until 1906 where a monthly fee was paid. In 1911 Barracas joined the Argentine Football Association under the name “Villa Soldati” and began participating in the Argentine football intermediate division.

In 1913 the club officially changed its name to "Barracas Central". The team crowned champion of the second division, División Intermedia, therefore gaining promotion to the Primera División, where Barracas would play until 1931 when football became professional in Argentina, with a new dissident league, Liga Argentina de Football organizing its own championships. Barracas Central stayed in the official league (that remained amateur) until 1934 when both leagues merged, being all the amateur teams relegated to the second division.

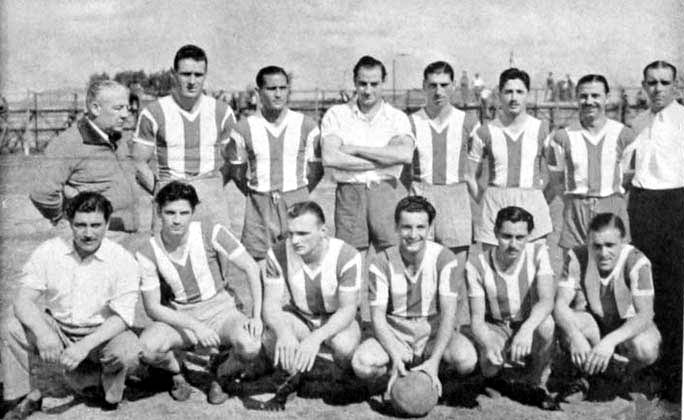
Barracas Central in 1944. That team won the Primera C title

In 1939 Barracas Central was near to promote to the first division, playing a hexagonal tournament which was eventually won by Banfield as Barracas and All Boys both finished second. The team could not escape relegation in 1941 where it would stay in the third division (Primera C) until 1944 when Barracas Central went through the season undefeated, with 14 wins and 2 draws, winning the competition.

By 1948 the club managed to get back up to the second division, but the AFA undertook a restructuring of the competitions, introducing the Division's A, B, C and D. The clubs that would take part in the C and D division's were generally the ones which did not meet stadium requirements, as chosen by the Argentine Football Federation, Barracas would play in the C and D leagues along with All Boys, Defensores de Belgrano and Estudiantes de Buenos Aires among others. From 1950 to 1970, Barracas played in the Division C when their best performance came in 1957 when they ranked in third position among 18 teams.

=== 1980–2000 ===
Despite a steady performance in the 1970 season, Barracas Central finished in the relegation zone, alongside Flandria, in 1980. The two played off in a single fixture, where Flandria avoided relegation by defeating Barracas 2–1. This sent Barracas down to the Primera D Metropolitana for the 1981 season. The 1981 Primera D was split into two zones, where which Barracas Central and Defensa y Justicia had both finished in first place in their respective zones, promoting both teams to the Primera C. After almost gaining promotion to the Primera B Metropolitana, Barracas fell short in 1985 and were relegated to the Primera D. The following years saw poor results from the squad until the 1988–89 season, which was the first year that the Argentine Football Association saw that seasons would begin in the middle of each year, Barracas managed to earn themselves a play-off position where which they would go on to beat Fénix, Villa San Carlos and Sacachispas to get it back to the Primera C.

The success was short lived as Barracas would finish in second last spot among 19 teams in the 1989–90 season, relegating the team back to the Primera D. Over two years, Barracas Central strengthen and once more climbed the ladder to Primera C. Those were the years when the club fought against relegation, rather than for promotion.

=== 2000–10 ===
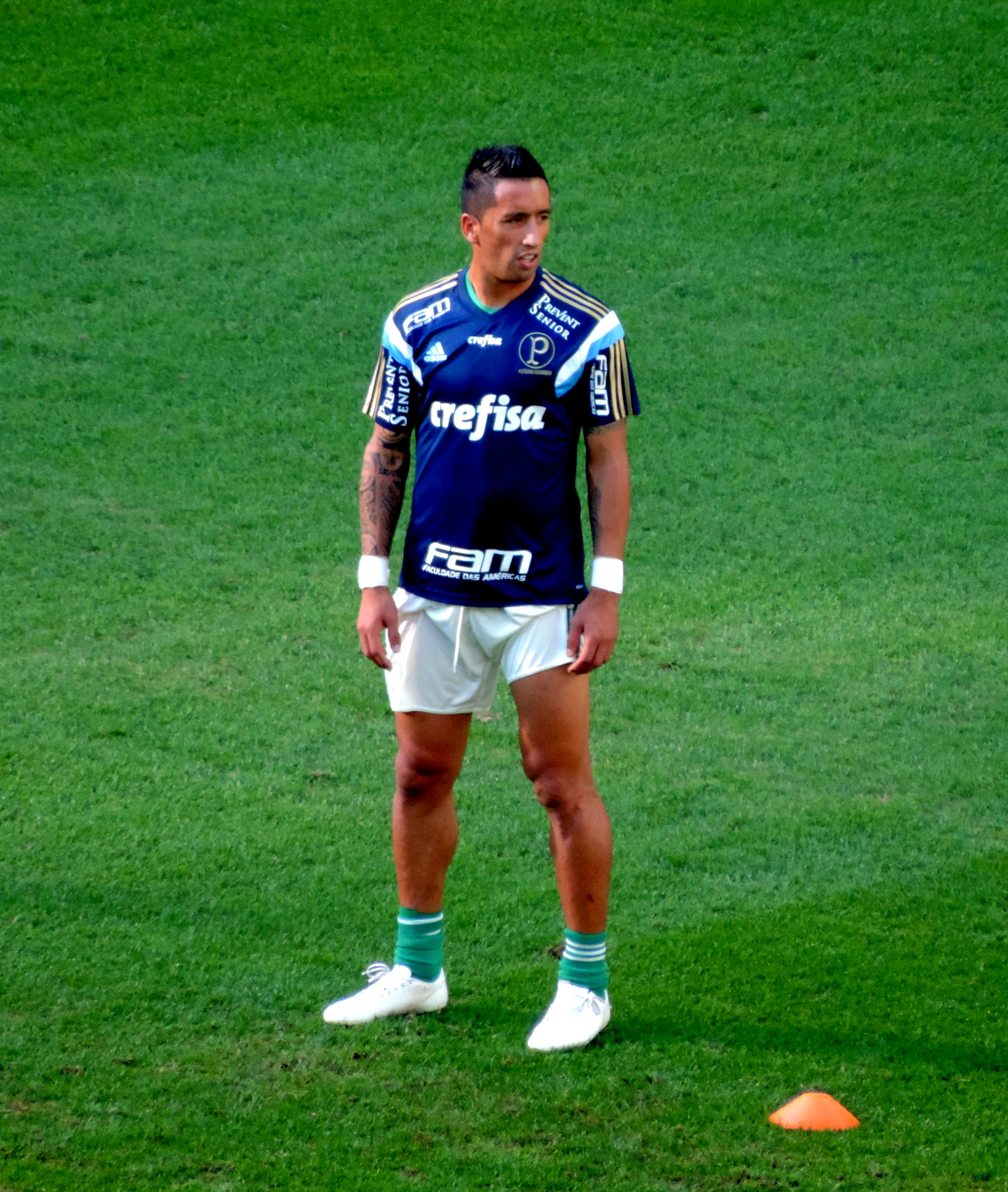
Lucas Barrios was formed at the club's youth academy

Having won the Primera C Metropolitana's Apertura title of 2003, Barracas Central could have achieved direct success of winning the Clausura of 2004. However, Barracas finished in fourth place which saw them face Argentino de Rosario in a two-legged play-off to determine who would gain promotion to the Primera B Metropolitana. The two sides met at Newell's Old Boys' Estadio Marcelo Bielsa for the first-leg which saw Barracas Central lose by 2–1. The second leg was played at Huracán's Estadio Tomás Adolfo Ducó which saw Barracas win by 2–1. The game was then decided by a penalty shootout which saw the side from Rosario win at 5–4 to gain promotion in place of Barracas. A few years later, in the 2006–2007 season, Barracas reached the same position again where which they would again face Argentino de Rosario in a play-off. Like 2004, Argentino de Rosario went out as winners, breaking the hearts of Los Baraqueños. The 2007–2008 season saw Barracas lead the table at one point but faded to finish fifth. Once more Barracas would feature in the play-offs, this time against Club El Porvenir which earnt them a tie with San Telmo, who had finished near the bottom of the Primera B Metropolitana. San Telmo won 3–2 at home and then lost 1–0 away, which meant their result was sufficient to satisfy their position in the Primera B Metropolitana while Barracas would once again stay in the Primera C.

=== Promotion to Primera B ===
The Primera C Metropolitana 2009–2011 season kicked off highly for Barracas, winning 21 games throughout the season and losing just 7. Barracas eventually finished in first position on the table, tied with Excursionistas with 73 points, Barracas were immediately promoted to the Primera B Metropolitana for the 2010–2011 where rivals Barracas Bolívar would finish in last place, seeing them relegated to the Primera D Metropolitana season. The defying moment which saw Barracas officially gain promotion to the Argentine third division was in a 1–0 victory against Excursianistas which was played at Club Atlético Atlanta's Estadio Don León Kolbovski behind closed doors, only allowing a small number of fans for each team, the goal came in the 94th minute by striker Carlos Salóm, whose attractive performance eventually earned him a spot with Argentine First Division club Olimpo.

Prior to the season, the club saw 9 new signings to the first-team after the departure of fan favourite Carlos Salóm. Barracas welcomed former Lanús goalkeeper Horacio Ramirez, who arrived back in Argentina from Peru's Coronel Bolognesi in January 2010, as well as 22-year-old striker Jorge Gonzalez from Puerto Rico's River Plate. Barracas kicked off the opening game at home in a 1–0 loss against Acassuso, it was not until round 6 where which they gained their first victory which was a 3–0 win at home against Nueva Chicago which saw two goals by new signing Sebastian Matos. Barracas finished in seventh spot on the table with 64 points earning them a play-off promotion tie with Nueva Chicago. Both teams tied 3–3, Sebastian Matos scoring two goals including an equaliser on 89 minutes. Nueva Chicago were promoted having finished in a higher position on the table.

=== Return to Primera ===
In December 2021, Barracas Central returned to Primera División after 87 years playing in lower divisions. Barracas beat Quilmes 0–0 (5–4, (p)) in the Torneo Reducido final. Therefore, Barracas promoted along with Tigre, which had been crowned champion of the 2021 Primera Nacional season.

== Stadium ==
Since 1916 the club's stadium is at the intersection of the streets Olavarria and Luna in the Capital federal, Argentina. Its construction, fencing, dressing rooms, offices, forums, were carried out in stages and by 1930 the stadium ultimately catered for 7,500 spectators. Until 1970, the stadium's structure remained almost entirely of wood, however it was all demolished, leaving only four cement steps on one side of the field to seat the Barracas fans.

In late 2004, having suffered for a long time due to the bad state of the field, extensive work was carried out which resulted in proper water drainage that allowed just over two seasons to allow the field to be in excellent condition. In 2006 the club decided to build a grandstand full of cement to the visiting public with capacity for 600 spectators. The grandstands were constructed in the same place as to where the wooden grandstands were based in the past. In 2010, the club decided to move the Hooligans base from behind the goals to the side of the field, adding four more cement steps. The stadium sits approximately 30 metres from Club Atlético Huracán's Estadio Tomás Adolfo Ducó and is also located next to La Villa of Barracas.

== Players ==
=== Current squad ===
As of 23 September 2026

Note: Flags indicate national team as defined under FIFA eligibility rules; some limited exceptions apply. Players may hold more than one non-FIFA nationality.

No.	Pos.	Nation	Player
1	GK	PAR	Juan Espínola (on loan from Newell's Old Boys)
2	DF	ARG	Nicolás Capraro
4	DF	ARG	Damián Martínez
5	MF	ARG	Dardo Miloc
6	DF	ARG	Rodrigo Insúa
7	FW	ARG	Juan Barbieri
8	MF	ARG	Tomás Porra
9	FW	ARG	Gonzalo Morales (on loan from Boca Juniors)
10	MF	ARG	Iván Tapia (captain)
11	FW	ARM	Norberto Briasco (on loan from Boca Juniors)
13	DF	ARG	Rafael Barrios
14	DF	ARG	Kevin Jappert (on loan from Atlético Rafaela)
15	DF	URU	Yonatthan Rak
16	MF	ARG	Iván Guaraz
17	DF	ARG	Elías Pereyra
18	MF	ARG	Manuel Duarte
19	MF	ARG	Carlos Arce

No.	Pos.	Nation	Player
20	FW	URU	Jhonatan Candia
21	FW	ARG	Lucas Gamba
23	FW	PUR	Wilfredo Rivera
24	MF	ARG	Enzo Taborda (on loan from Independiente)
25	MF	COL	Yeison Gordillo
28	MF	PAR	Rodrigo Bogarín
30	GK	ARG	Marcelo Miño
31	DF	ARG	Nicolás Demartini (on loan from Temperley)
32	DF	ARG	Fernando Tobio
33	MF	ARG	Gonzalo Maroni (on loan from Boca Juniors)
34	FW	ARG	Nicolás Orsini
35	MF	ARG	Esteban Rolón
36	MF	ARG	Tomás Lavezzi
37	DF	ARG	Gastón Campi
38	GK	ARG	Juan Pablo Insúa
77	FW	ARG	Facundo Bruera (on loan from San Lorenzo)
79	MF	ARG	Maximiliano Puig

=== Reserve squad ===
Note: Flags indicate national team as defined under FIFA eligibility rules; some limited exceptions apply. Players may hold more than one non-FIFA nationality.

No.	Pos.	Nation	Player
51	DF	ARG	Lautaro Bilbao
53	DF	ARG	Tomás Guimarey
54	MF	ARG	Bruno Mascheroni
55	MF	ARG	Oziel Gorosito
56	MF	ARG	Leandro Ballota
57	FW	ARG	Gianluca Scarvaci

No.	Pos.	Nation	Player
58	FW	ARG	Octavio Vallejos
59	MF	ARG	Faustino Barreto
60	FW	ARG	Lucas Villagra
61	FW	ARG	Julián Tripepi
62	MF	ARG	Alejandro Rodríguez
63	DF	ARG	Alejandro Hermes

=== Out on loan ===
Note: Flags indicate national team as defined under FIFA eligibility rules; some limited exceptions apply. Players may hold more than one non-FIFA nationality.

No.	Pos.	Nation	Player
8	MF	ARG	Siro Rosané (at Estudiantes RC until 31 December 2026)
22	MF	ARG	Bahiano García (at Chaco For Ever until 31 December 2026)

No.	Pos.	Nation	Player
33	MF	SYR	Facundo Mater (at Universidad de Concepción until 31 December 2026)

=== Current coaching staff ===
Position	Staff
Head coach	(Argentina) Damián Ayude
Assistant coach	(Argentina) Rodrigo Lista
Fitness coach	(Argentina) Gustavo Rojas
Video analyst	(Argentina) Luciano Forciniti
Video analyst	(Argentina) Matías Manfredi
Goalkeeper coach	(Argentina) Lisandro Mendoza
Video scouting	(Argentina) Cristian Galván

== Honours ==
=== National ===
- División Intermedia (1): 1919 AAm
- Primera B Metropolitana (1): 2018–19
- Primera C (3): 1944, 1948, 2010
- Primera D (2): 1974, 1981
