= Argentine Football Association =

Governing body of association football in Argentina

Coordinates: 34°36′02″S 58°23′09″W

CONMEBOL
- Founded: 21 February 1893; 133 years ago
- Headquarters: Viamonte 1366, Buenos Aires, Argentina
- FIFA affiliation: 1 July 1912; 114 years ago
- CONMEBOL affiliation: 9 July 1916; 110 years ago
- President: Claudio Tapia
- Vice-President: Juan Román Riquelme
- Website: afa.com.ar

The Argentine Football Association (Spanish: Asociación del Fútbol Argentino, locally [asosjaˈsjon del ˈfuðβol aɾxenˈtino]; AFA) is the governing body of football in Argentina based in Buenos Aires. It organises the main divisions of Argentine league system (from Primera División to Torneo Regional Federal and Torneo Promocional Amateur), including domestic cups: Copa Argentina, Supercopa Argentina, Trofeo de Campeones de la Liga Profesional, and the Supercopa Internacional. The body also manages all of Argentina's national teams, including the Senior, U-20, U-17, U-15, Olympic, and women's squads. It also organizes the women's, children, youth, futsal, and other local leagues.

The AFA also organised all the Primera División championships from 1893 to 2016–17. From the 2017–18 season, the "Superliga Argentina", an entity which was administered independently and had its own statute, took over the Primera División championships. Nevertheless, the Superliga was contractually linked with the main football body. The last championship organised by the Superliga was 2019–20; shortly after the season ended the body was dissolved.

== History ==
The Argentine Association Football League (in English) was founded on 21 February 1893 by Alexander Watson Hutton, considered "the father" of Argentine football. The Argentine Association is the oldest in South America and one of the oldest outside Europe. In 1906, Florencio Martínez de Hoz became the first Argentine-born president of the association.

In 1912, the president of Gimnasia y Esgrima (BA), Ricardo Aldao, broke up with the association, establishing an own league, the "Federación Argentina de Football" which organized a parallel tournament. Some teams moved to the FAF were Gimnasia y Esgrima (LP), Independiente, Estudiantes (LP) and Atlanta. The league lasted until 1914 when rejoining Asociación Argentina de Football, forming a unique league for the 1915 season.

The second dissident league was formed in 1919 and named "Asociación Amateurs de Football", organizing its own championships (as FAF had done) until 1926 when it merged to the official association. The dissident league included some of the most prominent teams, such as River Plate, Racing, Independiente and San Lorenzo, with the exception of Boca Juniors that remained in the official "Asociación Argentina de Football".

When both leagues merged for the 1927 season, the association was again renamed to "Asociación Amateur Argentina de Football" until the professionalization of the sport in 1931 when it switched to "Liga Argentina de Football". The first round of the recently created professional championship was on 31 May 1931.

Despite football turning professional in Argentina, some clubs wanted to remain amateur, so they formed a new league, the "Asociación de Football Amateur y Profesionales", which organized a parallel tournament until 1934 when the dissident association merged with LAF on 3 November 1934 to form the "Asociación del Football Argentino" which has remained since.

In 2015, during the presidential elections to elect a new president for the body, there were two candidates to occupy Julio Humberto Grondona's chair, Marcelo Tinelli –who wanted a change in how things were going, like eliminating corruption between some clubs and the AFA– and Luis Segura, who had taken charge after Grondona's death, with the intention of extending his mandate.

With 75 presidents of different Argentine clubs voting, on election day something went wrong when the final count resulted in a draw of 38 to 38 (76 votes in total). The explanation given was that one of the electors put a double vote and that mistake was not reported. As a result, the executive committee decided to postpone the election.

After some meetings to put an end to the conflict, both candidates agreed to have another election in June 2016.

In June 2016, AFA president Luis Segura was charged with "aggravated administrative fraud". Segura has been replaced on an interim basis by the AFA's executive secretary, Damián Dupiellet.

In 2017, the association approved the creation of a new entity, named "Superliga Argentina de Fútbol", which would take over the organization of the Primera División championship. The main European football leagues such as the English Premier League or the Spanish La Liga, that are organized by associations dedicated exclusively to those championships and run as separate entities from their respective National Associations, served as inspiration for the creation of the Superliga.

The 2016–17 Primera División championship was the last tournament organized by the AFA. Starting with the 2017–18 season to 2019–20 season, the "Superliga Argentina", an entity administered by itself with its own statute, organised Primera División championships. In March 2020, AFA dissolved the Superliga and took over the Primera División again.

In 2026, FIFA opened disciplinary proceedings against the AFA and its players for a series of alleged breaches at the 2026 FIFA World Cup.

== Names ==
The body has been renamed several times since its establishment in 1893, in most of the cases translating the original English names to Spanish. The list of names is the following:

- Argentine Association Football League (1893–1903) (Note: The organisation was founded with the same name as its predecessor, the AAFL of 1891)
- Argentine Football Association (1903–1912)
- Asociación Argentina de Football (1912–1927)
- Asociación Amateur Argentina de Football (1927–1931)
- Asociación de Football Amateurs y Profesionales (1931–1934)
- Asociación del Fútbol Argentino (1934–present) (Note: Translated into Spanish as "Asociación del Fútbol Argentino" in 1946)

== Current board ==
As of 22 May 2024:

- President: Claudio Tapia
- Vice-presidents:
  - Jorge Amor Ameal (Boca Juniors)
  - Rodolfo D'Onofrio (River Plate)
  - David Garzón (Huracán)
  - Carlos Montaña (Def. de Belgrano)
  - Guillermo Raed (C.A. Mitre)
- General Secretary: Víctor Blanco
- Treasurer: Pablo Toviggino
- Executive Secretary: Luís M. Chebel
- Men's senior head coach: Lionel Scaloni
- Men's U-20 head coach: Diego Placente
- Women's head coach: Carlos Borrello
- National teams General Director: César Luis Menotti

== Competitions ==
=== Official Competitions ===
The men’s Argentina Football Association (AFA) has won three FIFA World Cups: 1978 (Daniel Passarella was the captain and Cesar Luis Menotti was the manager), 1986 (Diego Maradona for captain and Carlos Bilardo for manager), and 2022 (Lionel Messi was the captain and Lionel Scaloni was, and currently still is, the manager).

The list of official competitions organized by the Argentine Football Association since its creation in 1893 are:

Current competitions
Name	Organised
Primera División	1891, 1893–2017, 2020–present (Note: In fact, the first official "Primera División" championship was held in 1891 and organized by a precedent association, "Argentine Association Football League", dissolved at the end of the season. Since the 2017–18 season to the 2019–20 season, Primera División was organized by the Superliga Argentina de Fútbol.)
Primera B	1899–present
Primera C	1900–present
Copa Argentina	1969–1970, 2011–present (Note: The Copa Argentina was re-launched in 2011.)
Primera Nacional	1986–present
Primera División (Futsal)	1986–present
Primera División A (Women´s)	1991–present
Primera División B (Futsal) (es)	1998–present
Torneo del Interior (Women´s) (es)	2012–present
Supercopa Argentina	2012–present (Note: Contested by the champions of Primera División and Copa Argentina.)
Torneo Federal A	2014–present
Primera División C (Futsal)	2014–present
Primera División B (Women`s)	2016–present
Primera División D (Futsal)	2017–present
Torneo Regional Federal	2018–present
Liga Nacional de Futsal Argentina (es)	2018–present
Primera División C (Women´s)	2019–present
Trofeo de Campeones de la Liga Profesional	2020–present
Copa Federal de Fútbol Femenino (es)	2021–present
Supercopa Internacional	2022–present (Note: Contested by the champions of Primera División and Trofeo de Campeones.)
Torneo Promocional Amateur	2024–present
Defunct competitions
Copa de Honor Municipalidad de Buenos Aires	1905–1936
Copa de Competencia Jockey Club	1913–1933
Copa de Competencia La Nación	1913–1914
Copa Dr. Carlos Ibarguren	1913–1958
Copa Estímulo	1920–1926
Copa Presidente de la Nación	1927–1989 (Note: Created and first organised by dissident Asociación Amateurs de Football and contested by representatives of regional leagues. When the AAmF folded, the AFA took over the competition, organising it until its last edition in 1989.)
Copa Adrián C. Escobar	1939–1949
Campeonato de la República Copa Gral Pedro Ramírez	1943–1945 (Note: Also known as "Campeonato de la República", it received the name "Copa General de División Pedro Pablo Ramírez", due to the trophy having been donated by the de facto President of Argentina, Pedro P. Ramírez)
Copa de Competencia Británica	1944–1948
Primera D	1950–2023
Copa Suecia	1958 (Note: Held once to keep league teams in readiness while the 1958 FIFA World Cup was being played)
Torneo Regional	1967–1986
Torneo del Interior (es)	1986–1995
Copa Centenario de la AFA	1993 (Note: Held once to celebrate the 100th. anniversary of the Association)
Torneo Argentino A	1995–2014
Torneo Argentino B	1995–2014
Torneo Argentino C	2005–2014
Torneo Nacional de Futsal (es)	2008–2017
Copa Campeonato	2013–2014 (Note: Once Inicial and Final tournaments had finished, both winners played a match named "Superfinal". The Association had determined that the first edition (played in 2013) would be considered as a Primera División official title (2012–13 season), therefore Vélez Sársfield was awarded its 10th official championship after defeating Newell's Old Boys. Nevertheless, from the 2014 edition it was determined that the Superfinal would not be considered as a Primera División title but a national cup.)
Torneo Federal B	2014–2017
Torneo Federal C (es)	2015–2018
Copa Bicentenario	2016
Copa de la Liga Profesional	2020–2024

=== Dissident Competitions ===
The following table include competitions organized by dissident associations.

Other competitions
Name	Time	Association
Copa de Competencia (AAm)	1920–1926	Asociación Amateurs de Football
Copa Presidente de la Nación	1920–1926	Asociación Amateurs de Football (Note: The AFA took over the competition when the AAmF folded.)
Copa de Competencia (LAF)	1932–1933	Liga Argentina de Football
Copa Adrián Beccar Varela	1932–1933	Liga Argentina de Football

== Presidents ==
Official Association

Asociación del Fútbol Argentino
Period	President/s
1893–1896	Alexander Watson Hutton
1897–1898	Alfredo P. Boyd
1899	Charles Wibberley
1900–1905	Frank Chevallier Boutell
1906	Florencio Martínez de Hoz
1907–1908	Emilio Hansen
1909–1914	Hugo Wilson
1915–1917	Adolfo Orma
1918–1919	Ricardo Aldao
1919–1921	Federico Luzio
1921–1922	Benjamin Toulouse
1922–1924	Aldo Cantoni
1924–1926	Virgilio Tedin Uriburu
1926	Natalio Botana
1927–1929	Adrián Beccar Varela
1929–1932	Juan Pignier
1932	Carlos Anessi
1932–1933	Silvio Serra
1933–1934	José Claisse
1934	Alejandro Russo
1934	Tiburcio Padilla
1935	Ernesto F. Malbec
1936	Ángel Molinari
1937–1938	Eduardo Sánchez Terrero
1939–1940	Adrián Escobar
1941–1943	Ramón Castillo
1944	Jacinto Armando
1945	Agustín Nicolás Matienzo
1946	Eduardo J. Avalos
1947	Pedro Canaveri
1948–1949	Oscar Nicolini
1949	Cayetano Giardulli
1950–1953	Valentín Suárez
1954–1955	Domingo Peluffo
1955	Cecilio Conditi
1956	Arturo Bullrich (Note: Interventor)
1957–1965	Raúl Colombo
1966	Francisco Perette
1967–1968	Valentin Suárez
1968	Armando Ramos Ruiz
1969	Aldo J. Porri
1969	Oscar L. Ferrari
1969–1971	Juan Oneto Gaona
1971–1973	Raúl D'Onofrio
1973	Horacio Bruzzone
1973–1974	Baldomero Gigan
1974	Fernando Mitjans (Note: Director)
1974–1976	David Bracuto (Note: Expelled by the Argentine military dictatorship)
1976–1979	Alfredo Cantilo
1979–2014	Julio Grondona
2014–2016	Luis Segura
2016–2017	Armando Pérez
2017–present	Claudio Tapia

Dissident Associations

Federación Argentina de Football
Period	President/s
1912–1914	Ricardo Aldao

Asociación Amateurs de Football
Period	President/s
1919	Juan Mignaburu
1920–1926	Adrián Beccar Varela

Liga Argentina de Football (Note: When football became professional in Argentina, the teams that wanted to remain amateur formed this league that organized its own tournaments from 1931 to 1934, when it merged with the professional body, with all of its teams being relegated to the second division.)
Period	President/s
1931	Julio Planisi
1932–1934	Eduardo Larrandart
1934	Tiburcio Padilla

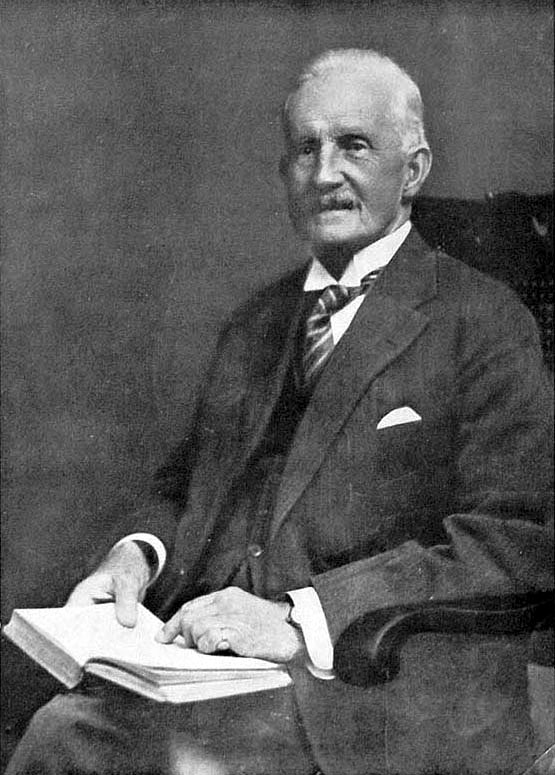
Alexander Watson Hutton, the first president of the Argentine Football Association in 1893

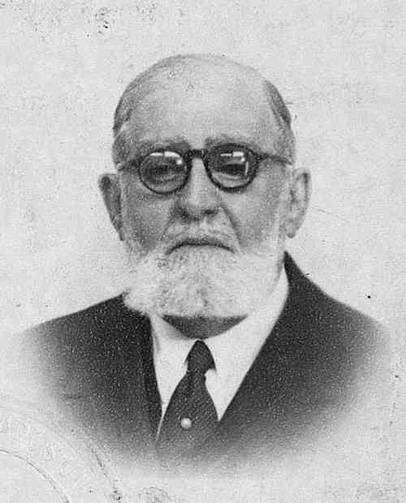
Ricardo Aldao (1918–19), had also presided dissident Federación Argentina de Football

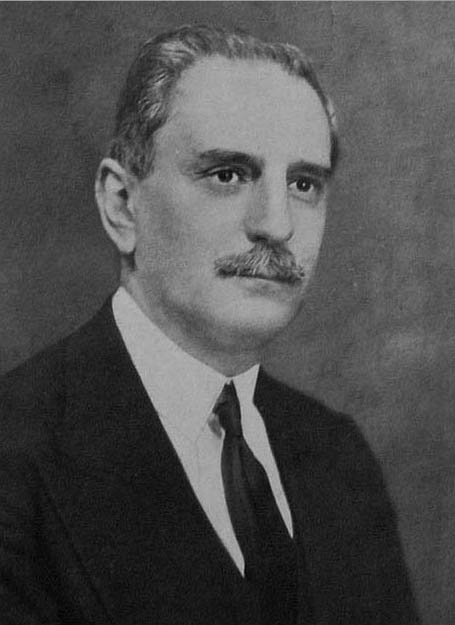
Adrián Beccar Varela presided from 1927 to his death in 1929

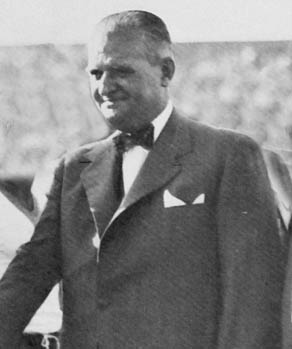
Adrián C. Escobar (1939–41)

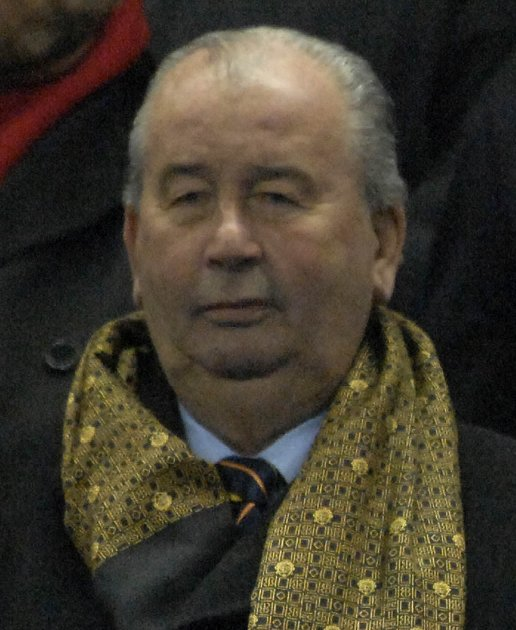
Julio Grondona had the longest tenure at the AFA, with 35 years as President of the body
