= 2025 Club Atlético Tigre season =

Club Atlético Tigre
2025 season
- Chairman: Martín Suárez
- Manager: Diego Dabove
- Stadium: Estadio José Dellagiovanna
- Torneo Apertura: Round of 16
- Torneo Clausura: Quarter-finals
- Copa Argentina: Quarter-finals
Home colours	Away colours

The 2025 season was the 123rd for Club Atlético Tigre and their 4th consecutive season in the Primera División. The club also participated in the Copa Argentina.

== Squad ==
=== Current squad ===
As of 19 March, 2025.

Note: Flags indicate national team as defined under FIFA eligibility rules; some limited exceptions apply. Players may hold more than one non-FIFA nationality.

No.	Pos.	Nation	Player
2	DF	ARG	Joaquín Laso
3	DF	ARG	Nahuel Banegas (on loan from San Martín (Tucumán))
4	DF	ARG	Martín Ortega
5	DF	URU	Ramón Arias
6	DF	ARG	Diego Sosa
7	FW	VEN	Eric Ramírez (on loan from Dynamo Kyiv)
8	DF	ARG	Martín Garay
9	FW	ARG	Ijiel Protti
10	FW	ARG	Lucas Besozzi
11	FW	ARG	Darío Sarmiento
12	GK	ARG	Felipe Zenobio
16	MF	ARG	Lorenzo Scipioni
17	MF	URU	Ignacio Neira
18	FW	PAR	Blas Armoa
19	FW	PAR	Alfio Oviedo

No.	Pos.	Nation	Player
20	MF	ARG	Héctor Fértoli
21	MF	ARG	Sebastián Medina
22	MF	ARG	Julián López
23	MF	ARG	Gonzalo Piñeiro
24	GK	ARG	Alan Sosa
27	MF	ARG	Santiago González
28	FW	PAR	Romeo Benítez
29	FW	ARG	Ignacio Russo
30	DF	ARG	Nehuén Paz
31	DF	ARG	Federico Tévez
33	MF	ARG	Elías Cabrera (on loan from Vélez Sarsfield)
34	FW	ARG	David Romero
40	DF	ARG	Alan Barrionuevo
47	MF	ARG	Jabes Saralegui (on loan from Boca Juniors)
77	MF	ARG	Maximiliano Zalazar (on loan from Boca Juniors)

=== Transfers In ===
Pos.	Player	Transferred from	Fee	Date	Source
MF	(Argentina) Lucas Besozzi	(Argentina) Lanús	Loan	16 January 2025	
FW	(Argentina) Braian Martínez	(Argentina) Independiente	Loan	20 June 2025	
DF	(Chile) Guillermo Soto	(Chile) Universidad Católica	Loan	26 June 2025	
DF	(Argentina) Tomás Cardona	(Brazil) Fortaleza	Loan	27 June 2025	

== Competitions ==
=== Overall record ===
Competition	First match	Last match	Starting round	Final position	Record							
Competition	First match	Last match	Starting round	Final position	Pld	W	D	L	GF	GA	GD	Win %
Torneo Apertura	23 January 2025	10 May 2025	Matchday 1	Round of 16	17	8	3	6	19	14	+5	47.06
Torneo Clausura	14 July 2025	1 December 2025	Matchday 1	Quarter-finals	18	6	8	4	15	13	+2	33.33
Copa Argentina	22 March 2025	5 September 2025	Round of 64	Quarter-finals	4	3	0	1	7	3	+4	75.00
Total					39	17	11	11	41	30	+11	43.59

Source: Competitions

=== Primera División ===
==== Torneo Apertura ====
===== League table =====
Pos	Team	Pld	W	D	L	GF	GA	GD	Pts	Qualification
3	Racing	16	9	1	6	26	16	+10	28	Advance to round of 16
4	Huracán	16	7	6	3	19	12	+7	27	Advance to round of 16
5	Tigre	16	8	3	5	18	12	+6	27	Advance to round of 16
6	Independiente Rivadavia	16	7	6	3	20	17	+3	27	Advance to round of 16
7	Barracas Central	16	7	5	4	20	18	+2	26	Advance to round of 16

Source: AFA

===== Results by round =====
Round	1
Ground	H
Result	
Position	

A = Away; H = Home; W = Win; D = Draw; L = Loss

===== Matches =====
23 January 2025 1	Tigre	3–0	Vélez Sarsfield	Victoria
21:00 UTC−3	Ignacio Russo 3', 9'; Ortega 47'	Report		Stadium: Estadio José Dellagiovanna

30 January 2025 2	Argentinos Juniors	1–0	Tigre	Buenos Aires
21:30 UTC−3	Rodríguez 20'	Report		Stadium: Estadio Diego Armando Maradona

3 February 2025 3	Tigre	1–0	Unión	Victoria
19:15 UTC−3	Paz 42'	Report		Stadium: Estadio José Dellagiovanna

8 February 2025 4	Huracán	2–0	Tigre	Buenos Aires
--:-- UTC−3	Tissera 17'; Miljevic 83' (pen.)	Report		Stadium: Estadio Tomás Adolfo Ducó

11 February 2025 5	Tigre	1–0	Racing	Victoria
22:15 UTC−3	Saralegui 4'	Report		Stadium: Estadio José Dellagiovanna

15 February 2025 6	Independiente Rivadavia	1–4	Tigre	Mendoza
19:15 UTC−3	Retamar 70'	Report	Romero 5', 25'; Ignacio Russo 55'; Valenti 90+1' (o.g.)	Stadium: Estadio Bautista Gargantini

24 February 2025 7	Tigre	1–0	Banfield	Victoria
21:00 UTC−3	Ignacio Russo 59'	Report		Stadium: Estadio José Dellagiovanna

1 March 2025 8	Talleres	1–2	Tigre	Córdoba
21:30 UTC−3	Benavídez 44'	Report	Romero 30'; Oviedo 66'	Stadium: Estadio Mario Alberto Kempes

9 March 2025 9	Aldosivi	0–2	Tigre	Mar del Plata
17:00 UTC−3		Report	Ignacio Russo 7'; Besozzi 81'	Stadium: Estadio José María Minella

17 March 2025 10	Tigre	1–2	Central Córdoba	Victoria
19:00 UTC−3	Oviedo 72'	Report	Verón 80' (pen.); Heredia 90+1'	Stadium: Estadio José Dellagiovanna

28 March 2025 11	Defensa y Justicia	1–2	Tigre	Gobernador Costa
17:00 UTC−3	Miritello 52'	Report	Paz 58'; Medina 79'	Stadium: Estadio Norberto "Tito" Tomaghello

7 April 2025 12	Tigre	0–2	Newell's Old Boys	Victoria
20:00 UTC−3			Cuesta 13'; Herrera 74'	Stadium: Estadio José Dellagiovanna

12 April 2025 13	Barracas Central	1–0	Tigre	Buenos Aires
18:00 UTC−3	Candia 16'	Report		Stadium: Estadio Claudio Chiqui Tapia

22 April 2025 14	Tigre	0–0	Belgrano	Victoria
--:-- UTC−3		Report		Stadium: Estadio José Dellagiovanna

28 April 2025 15	Estudiantes	0–0	Tigre	La Plata
19:30 UTC−3		Report		Stadium: Estadio Jorge Luis Hirschi

4 May 2025 16	Tigre	1–1	Boca Juniors	Victoria
18:00 UTC−3	Scipioni 45+2'	Report	Zenón 20'	Stadium: José Dellagiovanna; Referee: Facundo Tello

===== Final stages =====
10 May 2025 Round of 16	San Lorenzo	2–1	Tigre	Buenos Aires
14:00	Vombergar 3'; Cuello 88'	Report	Fértoli 48'	Stadium: Pedro Bidegain; Referee: Yael Falcón Pérez

==== Torneo Clausura ====
===== League table =====
Pos	Team	Pld	W	D	L	GF	GA	GD	Pts	Qualification
5	Argentinos Juniors	16	7	3	6	18	13	+5	24	Advance to round of 16
6	Barracas Central	16	5	8	3	19	17	+2	23	Advance to round of 16
7	Tigre	16	5	7	4	14	13	+1	22	Advance to round of 16
8	Estudiantes (LP)	16	6	3	7	17	18	−1	21	Advance to round of 16
9	Banfield	16	6	3	7	15	21	−6	21	

Source: AFA

===== Matches =====
14 July 2025 1	Vélez Sarsfield	2–1	Tigre	Buenos Aires
21:15 UTC−3	Galván 45'; Machuca 45+4'	Report	Sosa 85' (pen.)	Stadium: José Amalfitani Stadium

20 July 2025 2	Tigre	2–1	Argentinos Juniors	Victoria
21:00 UTC−3	Saralegui 52'; Russo 90'	Report	Prieto 56'	Stadium: Estadio José Dellagiovanna

25 July 2025 3	Unión	0–0	Tigre	Santa Fe
21:15 UTC−3		Report		Stadium: Estadio 15 de Abril

8 August 2025 4	Tigre	0–1	Huracán	Victoria
19:00 UTC−3		Report	Gil 57'	Stadium: Estadio José Dellagiovanna

15 August 2025 5	Racing	1–2	Tigre	Avellaneda
21:00 UTC−3	Balboa 43'	Report	Martínez 90' (pen.); Russo 90+3'	Stadium: El Cilindro

22 August 2025 6	Tigre	1–1	Independiente Rivadavia	Victoria
20:00 UTC−3	Martínez 90+12' (pen.)	Report	Amarfil 71'	Stadium: Estadio José Dellagiovanna

26 September 2025 10	Central Córdoba	0–1	Tigre	Santiago del Estero
21:15 UTC−3		Report	Cabrera 60'	Stadium: Estadio Único Madre de Ciudades

20 October 2025 13	Tigre	2–2	Barracas Central	Victoria
21:30 UTC−3	Russo 83'; Medina 90+3'	Report	Candia 27'; Morales 84'	Stadium: Estadio José Dellagiovanna

9 November 2025 15	Tigre	1–0	Estudiantes	Victoria
21:30 UTC−3	Cabrera 24'	Report		Stadium: Estadio José Dellagiovanna

16 November 2025 16	Boca Juniors	2–0	Tigre	Buenos Aires
20:15 UTC−3	Costa 72'; Cavani 90+2' (pen.)	Report		Stadium: La Bombonera; Referee: Darío Herrera

===== Final stages =====
26 November 2025 Round of 16	Lanús	0–1	Tigre	Lanús
21:30 UTC−3		Report	Romero 47'	Stadium: Ciudad de Lanús – Néstor Díaz Pérez; Referee: Leandro Rey Hilfer

1 December 2025 Quarter-finals	Racing	0–0 (a.e.t.) (4–2 p)	Tigre	Avellaneda
21:30		Report		Stadium: El Cilindro; Referee: Andrés Merlos
	Penalties
	Martínez (penalty scored); Fernández (penalty scored); Rojas (penalty scored); García Basso (penalty scored)		(penalty missed) Cardona; (penalty scored) Sosa; (penalty missed) Laso; (penalty scored) López

=== Copa Argentina ===
22 March 2025 Round of 64	Tigre	3–0	Berazategui	Morón
19:15	Oviedo 49', 62'; Russo 66'	Report		Stadium: Nuevo Francisco Urbano; Referee: Lucas Comesaña

26 June 2025 Round of 32	Tigre	2–0	Banfield	Morón
19:30	Scipioni 29'; Armoa 75'	Report		Stadium: Estadio Nuevo Francisco Urbano; Referee: Andrés Gariano

2 August 2025 Round of 16	San Lorenzo	0–1	Tigre	Morón
16:15		Report	Fértoli 25'	Stadium: Nuevo Francisco Urbano; Referee: Yael Falcón Pérez

5 September 2025 Quarter-finals	Tigre	1–3	Independiente Rivadavia	Rosario
21:10	Saralegui 20'	Report	Fernández 14'; Sartori 73'; Bonifacio 88'	Stadium: Marcelo Bielsa; Referee: Pablo Dóvalo
