= 2019 Copa de la Superliga =

2019 Copa de la Superliga Argentina
Tournament details
- Country: Argentina
- Dates: 12 April – 2 June 2019
- Teams: 26

Final positions
- Champions: Tigre (1st title)
- Runners-up: Boca Juniors
- Copa Libertadores: Tigre
- Copa Sudamericana: Argentinos Juniors

Tournament statistics
- Matches played: 49
- Goals scored: 110 (2.24 per match)
- Top goal scorer: Javier Toledo (6 goals)

The 2019 Copa de la Superliga Argentina (named Copa de la Superliga YPF Infinia 2019 due to sponsorship by YPF) was the first edition of the Copa de la Superliga Argentina, Argentina's football league cup competition open to all 26 participants in the Superliga Argentina for the 2018–19 season. The competition was planned by the executive committee of the Superliga Argentina throughout 2018 with a final approval being given on 12 December 2018, and was played from 12 April to 2 June 2019, after the conclusion of the Superliga season.

Tigre were the champions, beating Boca Juniors by a 2–0 score in the final match played at Estadio Mario Alberto Kempes in Córdoba.

== Format ==
The competition was played as a knockout tournament in its entirety, with the top six teams in the 2018–19 Superliga season receiving byes to the round of 16, and the remaining 20 teams starting the competition in the first round, where they were paired into 10 ties according to their league placement, with the winners advancing to the round of 16. Matchups in all rounds prior to the final were played as two-legged ties, with the team with the best placement in the league season hosting the second leg, whilst the final was played as a single match at a neutral ground.

If teams were tied on aggregate in all rounds prior to the final, the away goals rule was used. If still tied, a penalty shoot-out was used to determine the winner. In the final, 30 minutes of extra time would be played if both teams were tied, and if still tied at the end of extra time, the champions would be determined in a penalty shoot-out.

As champions, Tigre qualified for the group stage of the 2020 Copa Libertadores, with the runners-up being entitled to a berth to the 2020 Copa Sudamericana. However, that berth was passed to semifinalists Argentinos Juniors since runners-up Boca Juniors as well as the other semifinalist Atlético Tucumán qualified for the Copa Libertadores.

== Schedule ==
The competition schedule was unveiled by the Superliga Argentina on 27 March 2019.

Round	First leg	Second leg
First Round	12–15 April 2019	19–21 April 2019
Round of 16	26–29 April 2019	3–6 May 2019
Quarterfinals	11–12 May 2019	14–16 May 2019
Semifinals	18–19 May 2019	25–26 May 2019
Final	2 June 2019	

== Seeding ==
Teams were seeded 1–26 according to their placements in the Superliga Argentina season. Seeds 1–6 received a bye to the round of 16, and seeds 7–26 played the competition from the first round.

Pos	Team	Pld	W	D	L	GF	GA	GD	Pts	Starting round
1	Racing	25	17	6	2	43	16	+27	57	Round of 16
2	Defensa y Justicia	25	15	8	2	33	18	+15	53	Round of 16
3	Boca Juniors	25	15	6	4	42	18	+24	51	Round of 16
4	River Plate	25	13	6	6	42	21	+21	45	Round of 16
5	Atlético Tucumán	25	12	6	7	36	29	+7	42	Round of 16
6	Vélez Sarsfield	25	11	7	7	34	25	+9	40	Round of 16
7	Independiente	25	10	8	7	35	28	+7	38	First round
8	Unión	25	9	9	7	29	24	+5	36	First round
9	Tigre	25	9	9	7	39	42	−3	36	First round
10	Huracán	25	9	8	8	28	28	0	35	First round
11	Lanús	25	9	7	9	27	32	−5	34	First round
12	Talleres (C)	25	9	6	10	25	24	+1	33	First round
13	Aldosivi	25	9	6	10	21	24	−3	33	First round
14	Godoy Cruz	25	9	5	11	23	30	−7	32	First round
15	Newell's Old Boys	25	7	8	10	26	23	+3	29	First round
16	Banfield	25	6	11	8	27	31	−4	29	First round
17	Estudiantes (LP)	25	7	8	10	21	25	−4	29	First round
18	Gimnasia y Esgrima (LP)	25	8	5	12	21	32	−11	29	First round
19	Patronato	25	7	5	13	29	37	−8	26	First round
20	Rosario Central	25	6	8	11	16	26	−10	26	First round
21	San Martín (SJ)	25	6	7	12	24	34	−10	25	First round
22	Belgrano	25	4	12	9	16	23	−7	24	First round
23	San Lorenzo	25	3	14	8	21	30	−9	23	First round
24	Colón	25	4	11	10	21	33	−12	23	First round
25	San Martín (T)	25	4	11	10	25	38	−13	23	First round
26	Argentinos Juniors	25	5	7	13	15	28	−13	22	First round

Source: AFA
Rules for classification: 1) points; 2) play-off (only if needed to decide championship); 3) goal difference; 4) goals scored; 5) head-to-head points; 6) head-to-head goal difference; 7) head-to-head goals scored.

== First round ==
The 20 teams placed from seventh to twenty-sixth in the 2018–19 Superliga Argentina played in the first round of the competition. The higher-seeded team in each tie played the second leg at home.

Team 1	Agg.	Team 2	1st leg	2nd leg
Estudiantes (LP)	2–1	Banfield	0–1	2–0
San Martín (T)	1–4	Unión	1–1	0–3
Colón	2–3	Tigre	0–0	2–3
San Martín (SJ)	2–2 (2–3 p)	Talleres (C)	2–0	0–2
Rosario Central	2–3	Aldosivi	0–2	2–1
Belgrano	3–4	Lanús	3–2	0–2
Patronato	2–2 (4–5 p)	Godoy Cruz	1–1	1–1
Argentinos Juniors	4–3	Independiente	3–2	1–1
San Lorenzo	0–0 (4–3 p)	Huracán	0–0	0–0
Gimnasia y Esgrima (LP)	3–2	Newell's Old Boys	0–1	3–1

=== First leg ===
12 April 2019	Colón	0–0	Tigre	Santa Fe
19:00		Report		Stadium: Brigadier General Estanislao López; Referee: Patricio Loustau

12 April 2019	Gimnasia y Esgrima (LP)	0–1	Newell's Old Boys	La Plata
21:10		Report	M. Rodríguez 90+7' (pen.)	Stadium: Juan Carmelo Zerillo; Referee: Néstor Pitana

13 April 2019	San Martín (SJ)	2–0	Talleres (C)	San Juan
15:30	Osorio 48'; Dening 63'	Report		Stadium: Ingeniero Hilario Sánchez; Referee: Germán Delfino

13 April 2019	Belgrano	3–2	Lanús	Córdoba
17:45	Patiño 2'; Sequeira 11'; Lértora 56'	Report	Moreno 7'; Quignon 86'	Stadium: Julio César Villagra; Referee: Fernando Echenique

13 April 2019	San Martín (T)	1–1	Unión	San Miguel de Tucumán
20:00	Acevedo 90+1'	Report	Cuadra 33'	Stadium: La Ciudadela; Referee: Silvio Trucco

14 April 2019	Estudiantes (LP)	0–1	Banfield	La Plata
15:30		Report	Carranza 29'	Stadium: Ciudad de La Plata; Referee: Facundo Tello

14 April 2019	San Lorenzo	0–0	Huracán	Buenos Aires
17:45		Report		Stadium: Pedro Bidegain; Referee: Fernando Espinoza

14 April 2019	Argentinos Juniors	3–2	Independiente	Buenos Aires
20:00	Hauche 40', 82'; Spinelli 50'	Report	Pérez 25'; Domínguez 88'	Stadium: Diego Armando Maradona; Referee: Mauro Vigliano

15 April 2019	Patronato	1–1	Godoy Cruz	Paraná
19:00	Berterame 46'	Report	Cardona 61'	Stadium: Presbítero Bartolomé Grella; Referee: Jorge Baliño

15 April 2019	Rosario Central	0–2	Aldosivi	Rosario
21:10		Report	Ledesma 45+1' (o.g.); Videla 81'	Stadium: Dr. Lisandro de la Torre; Referee: Fernando Rapallini

=== Second leg ===
19 April 2019	Banfield	0–2 (1–2 agg.)	Estudiantes (LP)	Banfield
17:45		Report	Sánchez 28'; Bertolo 61' (o.g.)	Stadium: Florencio Sola; Referee: Germán Delfino

19 April 2019	Huracán	0–0 (0–0 agg.) (3–4 p)	San Lorenzo	Buenos Aires
20:00		Report		Stadium: Tomás Adolfo Ducó; Referee: Néstor Pitana
	Penalties
	Gamba (penalty scored); Barrios (penalty missed); Álvarez (penalty scored); Roa (penalty missed); Alderete (penalty scored)		(penalty scored) Reniero; (penalty scored) Rodríguez; (penalty scored) Loaiza; (penalty missed) Barrios; (penalty scored) Rentería

20 April 2019	Aldosivi	1–2 (3–2 agg.)	Rosario Central	Mar del Plata
13:15	Colman 78'	Report	Aguirre 34'; Barbieri 82'	Stadium: José María Minella; Referee: Fernando Espinoza

20 April 2019	Lanús	2–0 (4–3 agg.)	Belgrano	Lanús
15:30	Quignon 22'; Techera 49' (o.g.)	Report		Stadium: Ciudad de Lanús – Néstor Díaz Pérez; Referee: Darío Herrera

20 April 2019	Talleres (C)	2–0 (2–2 agg.) (3–2 p)	San Martín (SJ)	Córdoba
17:45	Moreno 45+1'; Pochettino 46'	Report		Stadium: Mario Alberto Kempes; Referee: Fernando Rapallini
	Penalties
	Moreno (penalty scored); Pochettino (penalty scored); Ramírez (penalty scored); Palacios (penalty missed)		(penalty scored) Grahl; (penalty missed) Bogado; (penalty scored) Prósperi; (penalty missed) Osorio; (penalty missed) Ardente

20 April 2019	Godoy Cruz	1–1 (2–2 agg.) (5–4 p)	Patronato	Mendoza
20:00	Viera 11'	Report	Ávalos 56'	Stadium: Malvinas Argentinas; Referee: Fernando Echenique
	Penalties
	García (penalty scored); Viera (penalty scored); González (penalty scored); Cardona (penalty scored); Bernardello (penalty scored)		(penalty scored) Bravo; (penalty scored) Carabajal; (penalty scored) Gissi; (penalty scored) Geminiani; (penalty missed) Berterame

21 April 2019	Tigre	3–2 (3–2 agg.)	Colón	Victoria
13:15	Janson 40' (pen.); Pérez Acuña 55'; Luna 80' (pen.)	Report	Leguizamón 31'; Bernardi 35'	Stadium: José Dellagiovanna; Referee: Mauro Vigliano

21 April 2019	Newell's Old Boys	1–3 (2–3 agg.)	Gimnasia y Esgrima (LP)	Rosario
15:30	M. Rodríguez 38'	Report	Silva 59', 85' (pen.); Piovi 74'	Stadium: Marcelo Bielsa; Referee: Diego Abal

21 April 2019	Unión	3–0 (4–1 agg.)	San Martín (T)	Santa Fe
17:45	Méndez 20'; Mazzola 48'; Troyansky 87'	Report		Stadium: 15 de Abril; Referee: Andrés Merlos

21 April 2019	Independiente	1–1 (3–4 agg.)	Argentinos Juniors	Avellaneda
20:00	Pérez 49'	Report	Batallini 74'	Stadium: Libertadores de América; Referee: Facundo Tello

== Bracket ==
Round of 16
1	Tigre	1	3	4
16	Unión	2	1	3
8	Estudiantes (LP)	1	0	1
9	Racing (a)	1	0	1
5	Talleres (C)	3	0	3
12	Atlético Tucumán	2	2	4
4	Aldosivi	1	0	1
13	River Plate	1	6	7
6	Argentinos Juniors	1	1	2
11	San Lorenzo	0	1	1
3	Gimnasia y Esgrima (LP)	1	2	3
14	Defensa y Justicia	0	0	0
7	Lanús	1	0	1
10	Vélez Sarsfield	2	2	4
2	Godoy Cruz	1	1	2
15	Boca Juniors	2	3	5

Quarterfinals
Tigre	2	1	3
Racing	0	2	2
Atlético Tucumán (a)	3	1	4
River Plate	0	4	4
Argentinos Juniors	0	2	2
Gimnasia y Esgrima (LP)	0	1	1
Vélez Sarsfield	0	0	0 (4)
Boca Juniors (p)	0	0	0 (5)

Semifinals
Tigre	5	1	6
Atlético Tucumán	0	0	0
Argentinos Juniors	0	0	0
Boca Juniors	0	1	1

Final
Tigre	2
Boca Juniors	0

== Round of 16 ==
The top six teams in the 2018–19 Superliga Argentina season entered the competition in this round, joining the 10 first round winners. The higher-seeded team in each tie played the second leg at home.

Team 1	Agg.	Team 2	1st leg	2nd leg
Estudiantes (LP)	1–1 (a)	Racing	1–1	0–0
Tigre	4–3	Unión	1–2	3–1
Talleres (C)	3–4	Atlético Tucumán	3–2	0–2
Aldosivi	1–7	River Plate	1–1	0–6
Lanús	1–4	Vélez Sarsfield	1–2	0–2
Godoy Cruz	2–5	Boca Juniors	1–2	1–3
Argentinos Juniors	2–1	San Lorenzo	1–0	1–1
Gimnasia y Esgrima (LP)	3–0	Defensa y Justicia	1–0	2–0

=== First leg ===
26 April 2019	Talleres (C)	3–2	Atlético Tucumán	Córdoba
21:10	Palacios 15'; Moreno 54', 77'	Report	Toledo 40', 88'	Stadium: Mario Alberto Kempes; Referee: Nicolás Lamolina

27 April 2019	Lanús	1–2	Vélez Sarsfield	Lanús
17:45	De la Vega 43'	Report	Giménez 21'; Almada 72'	Stadium: Ciudad de Lanús – Néstor Díaz Pérez; Referee: Fernando Espinoza

27 April 2019	Estudiantes (LP)	1–1	Racing	La Plata
20:00	Pellegrini 62'	Report	Cristaldo 35'	Stadium: Ciudad de La Plata; Referee: Fernando Echenique

28 April 2019	Argentinos Juniors	1–0	San Lorenzo	Buenos Aires
15:30	Torrén 7'	Report		Stadium: Diego Armando Maradona; Referee: Andrés Merlos

28 April 2019	Aldosivi	1–1	River Plate	Mar del Plata
17:45	Chávez 70'	Report	Pérez 43'	Stadium: José María Minella; Referee: Mauro Vigliano

28 April 2019	Godoy Cruz	1–2	Boca Juniors	Mendoza
20:00	Merentiel 61'	Report	Pavón 31'; Mas 87'	Stadium: Malvinas Argentinas; Referee: Silvio Trucco

29 April 2019	Tigre	1–2	Unión	Victoria
19:00	Luna 73'	Report	Mazzola 26'; M. Pittón 29'	Stadium: José Dellagiovanna; Referee: Ariel Penel

29 April 2019	Gimnasia y Esgrima (LP)	1–0	Defensa y Justicia	La Plata
21:10	Silva 45+4'	Report		Stadium: Juan Carmelo Zerillo; Referee: Darío Herrera

=== Second leg ===
3 May 2019	River Plate	6–0 (7–1 agg.)	Aldosivi	Buenos Aires
21:10	Borré 26'; De La Cruz 30', 52', 73'; Pratto 67'; Ferreira 83'	Report		Stadium: Monumental Antonio Vespucio Liberti; Referee: Germán Delfino

4 May 2019	Atlético Tucumán	2–0 (4–3 agg.)	Talleres (C)	San Miguel de Tucumán
15:30	Díaz 52'; Toledo 84' (pen.)	Report		Stadium: Monumental José Fierro; Referee: Jorge Baliño

4 May 2019	Unión	1–3 (3–4 agg.)	Tigre	Santa Fe
17:45	Cuadra 3'	Report	Gómez 23' (o.g.); Montillo 28'; González 66'	Stadium: 15 de Abril; Referee: Hernán Mastrángelo

4 May 2019	Racing (a)	0–0 (1–1 agg.)	Estudiantes (LP)	Avellaneda
20:00		Report		Stadium: Presidente Juan Domingo Perón; Referee: Diego Abal

5 May 2019	San Lorenzo	1–1 (1–2 agg.)	Argentinos Juniors	Buenos Aires
15:30	Herrera 66'	Report	Reniero 81' (o.g.)	Stadium: Pedro Bidegain; Referee: Pablo Echavarría
Note: The kickoff of the match, scheduled at 15:30, was delayed by 1 hour due to a clash of kits between both teams.

5 May 2019	Defensa y Justicia	0–2 (0–3 agg.)	Gimnasia y Esgrima (LP)	Florencio Varela
17:45		Report	Hurtado 65'; Comba 73'	Stadium: Norberto Tomaghello; Referee: Andrés Merlos

5 May 2019	Boca Juniors	3–1 (5–2 agg.)	Godoy Cruz	Buenos Aires
20:00	Ábila 6', 54'; Zárate 87'	Report	Prieto 79'	Stadium: Alberto J. Armando; Referee: Facundo Tello

6 May 2019	Vélez Sarsfield	2–0 (4–1 agg.)	Lanús	Buenos Aires
21:10	L. Fernández 12'; Bouzat 45'	Report		Stadium: José Amalfitani; Referee: Fernando Rapallini

== Quarterfinals ==
The higher-seeded team in each tie played the second leg at home.

Team 1	Agg.	Team 2	1st leg	2nd leg
Tigre	3–2	Racing	2–0	1–2
Atlético Tucumán	4–4 (a)	River Plate	3–0	1–4
Vélez Sarsfield	0–0 (4–5 p)	Boca Juniors	0–0	0–0
Argentinos Juniors	2–1	Gimnasia y Esgrima (LP)	0–0	2–1

=== First leg ===
11 May 2019	Tigre	2–0	Racing	Victoria
17:45	Montillo 52'; González 88'	Report		Stadium: José Dellagiovanna; Referee: Andrés Merlos

11 May 2019	Atlético Tucumán	3–0	River Plate	San Miguel de Tucumán
20:00	Barbona 34'; Toledo 37', 78'	Report		Stadium: Monumental José Fierro; Referee: Fernando Echenique

12 May 2019	Argentinos Juniors	0–0	Gimnasia y Esgrima (LP)	Buenos Aires
17:45		Report		Stadium: Diego Armando Maradona; Referee: Néstor Pitana

12 May 2019	Vélez Sarsfield	0–0	Boca Juniors	Buenos Aires
20:00		Report		Stadium: José Amalfitani; Referee: Diego Abal

=== Second leg ===
14 May 2019	Racing	2–1 (2–3 agg.)	Tigre	Avellaneda
19:00	Orbán 19'; López 37'	Report	Pérez Acuña 89'	Stadium: Presidente Juan Domingo Perón; Referee: Mauro Vigliano

14 May 2019	River Plate	4–1 (4–4 agg.)	Atlético Tucumán (a)	Buenos Aires
21:10	Fernández 14'; Pratto 40', 84'; Suárez 56'	Report	Toledo 50'	Stadium: Monumental Antonio Vespucio Liberti; Referee: Ariel Penel

16 May 2019	Gimnasia y Esgrima (LP)	1–2 (1–2 agg.)	Argentinos Juniors	La Plata
19:00	Silva 57'	Report	Mac Allister 18'; Sandoval 73'	Stadium: Juan Carmelo Zerillo; Referee: Andrés Merlos

16 May 2019	Boca Juniors	0–0 (0–0 agg.) (5–4 p)	Vélez Sarsfield	Buenos Aires
21:10		Report		Stadium: Alberto J. Armando; Referee: Fernando Espinoza
	Penalties
	Benedetto (penalty scored); Pavón (penalty scored); Zárate (penalty scored); Fabra (penalty scored); Buffarini (penalty scored)		(penalty scored) Giménez; (penalty missed) Cufré; (penalty scored) Salinas; (penalty scored) Almada; (penalty scored) L. Fernández

== Semifinals ==
The higher-seeded team in each tie played the second leg at home.

Team 1	Agg.	Team 2	1st leg	2nd leg
Tigre	6–0	Atlético Tucumán	5–0	1–0
Argentinos Juniors	0–1	Boca Juniors	0–0	0–1

=== First leg ===
18 May 2019	Tigre	5–0	Atlético Tucumán	Victoria
18:45	Menossi 15'; Cavallaro 40', 59'; Morales 54'; Colazo 56'	Report		Stadium: José Dellagiovanna; Referee: Darío Herrera

19 May 2019	Argentinos Juniors	0–0	Boca Juniors	Buenos Aires
18:45		Report		Stadium: Diego Armando Maradona; Referee: Mauro Vigliano

=== Second leg ===
25 May 2019	Atlético Tucumán	0–1 (0–6 agg.)	Tigre	San Miguel de Tucumán
18:45		Report	Silveira 62'	Stadium: Monumental José Fierro; Referee: Germán Delfino

26 May 2019	Boca Juniors	1–0 (1–0 agg.)	Argentinos Juniors	Buenos Aires
18:45	López 54'	Report		Stadium: Alberto J. Armando; Referee: Facundo Tello

== Final ==
2 June 2019
18:45

Tigre	2–0	Boca Juniors
González 23'; Janson 31' (pen.)	Report

Estadio Mario Alberto Kempes, Córdoba
Referee: Néstor Pitana

== Statistics ==
=== Top goalscorers ===
Rank	Player	Club	Goals
1	(Argentina) Javier Toledo	Atlético Tucumán	6
2	(Uruguay) Santiago Silva	Gimnasia y Esgrima (LP)	4
3	(Uruguay) Nicolás De La Cruz	River Plate	3
3	(Argentina) Federico González	Tigre	3
3	(Argentina) Lucas Pratto	River Plate	3
3	(Colombia) Dayro Moreno	Talleres (C)	3
7	(Argentina) Gabriel Hauche	Argentinos Juniors	2
7	(Argentina) Ramón Ábila	Boca Juniors	2
7	(Argentina) Pablo Pérez	Independiente	2
7	(Argentina) Facundo Quignon	Lanús	2
7	(Argentina) Maximiliano Rodríguez	Newell's Old Boys	2
7	(Argentina) Juan Cavallaro	Tigre	2
7	(Argentina) Lucas Janson	Tigre	2
7	(Argentina) Carlos Luna	Tigre	2
7	(Argentina) Walter Montillo	Tigre	2
7	(Argentina) Matías Pérez Acuña	Tigre	2
7	(Argentina) Pablo Cuadra	Unión	2
7	(Argentina) Nicolás Mazzola	Unión	2

Source: AFA

=== Awards ===
The following players were rewarded for their performances during the tournament.

- Best coach: (Argentina) Néstor Gorosito (Tigre)
- Best player: (Argentina) Walter Montillo (Tigre)
- Topscorer: (Argentina) Javier Toledo (Atlético Tucumán)
