= San Fernando, Buenos Aires =

San Fernando
- District
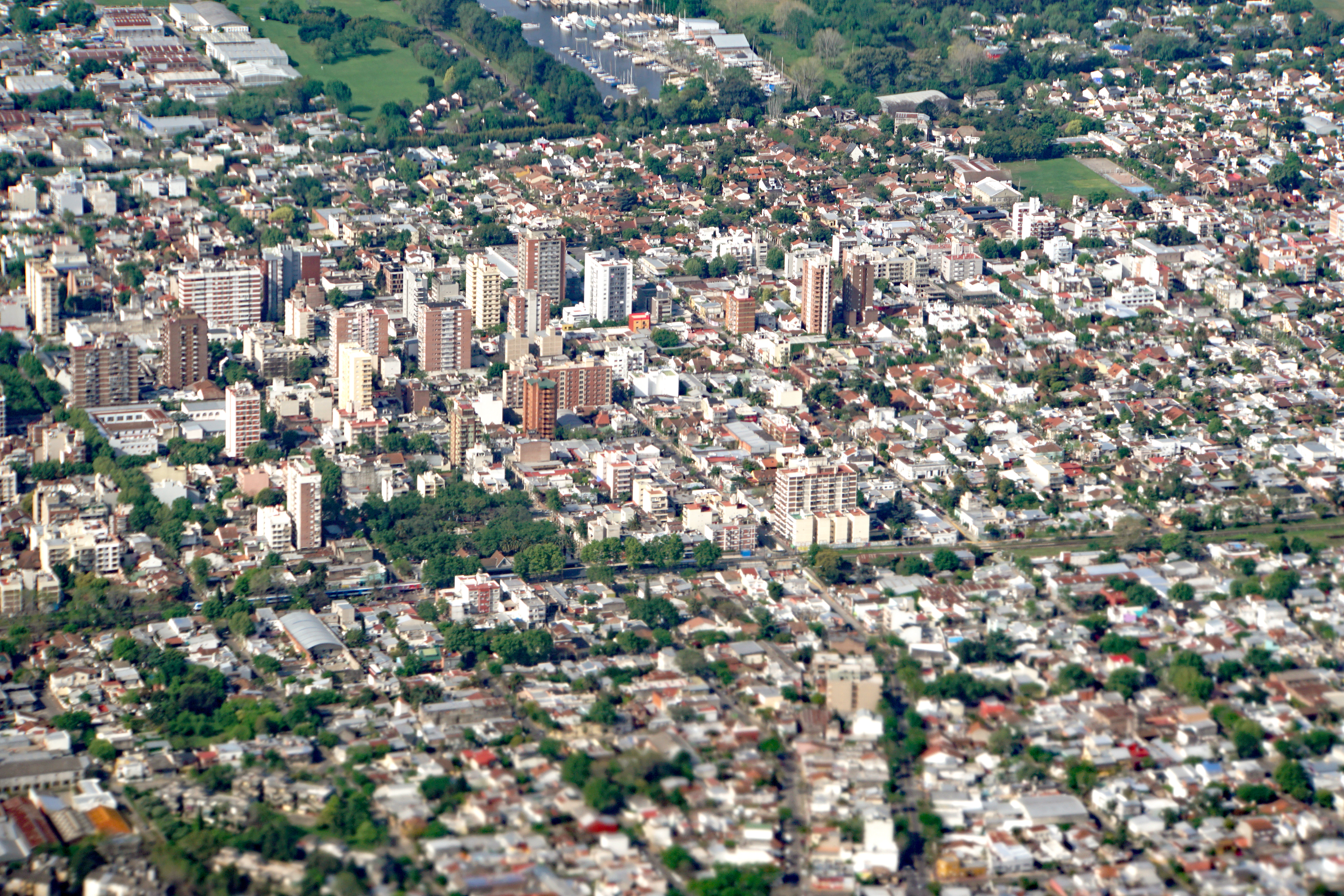
- Aerial view

- Location in Greater Buenos Aires
- Coordinates: 34°26′25″S 58°33′28″W
- Country: Argentina
- Province: Buenos Aires
- Partido: San Fernando

Population (2001 census [INDEC])
  - Total: 145,165
- CPA Base: B 1646
- Area code: +54 11

San Fernando is a city in the Gran Buenos Aires area, in Argentina, and capital of the San Fernando Partido, 20 km (12 mi) north of the city of Buenos Aires.

== Geography ==
Located in the northern area of Gran Buenos Aires, San Fernando is composed of two clearly differentiated areas: a densely populated mainland section, with predominance of industrial, commercial and service areas; and a section of Islands of the Paraná Delta of 950 km^{2} (370 sq mi). It is the nautical capital of Argentina.

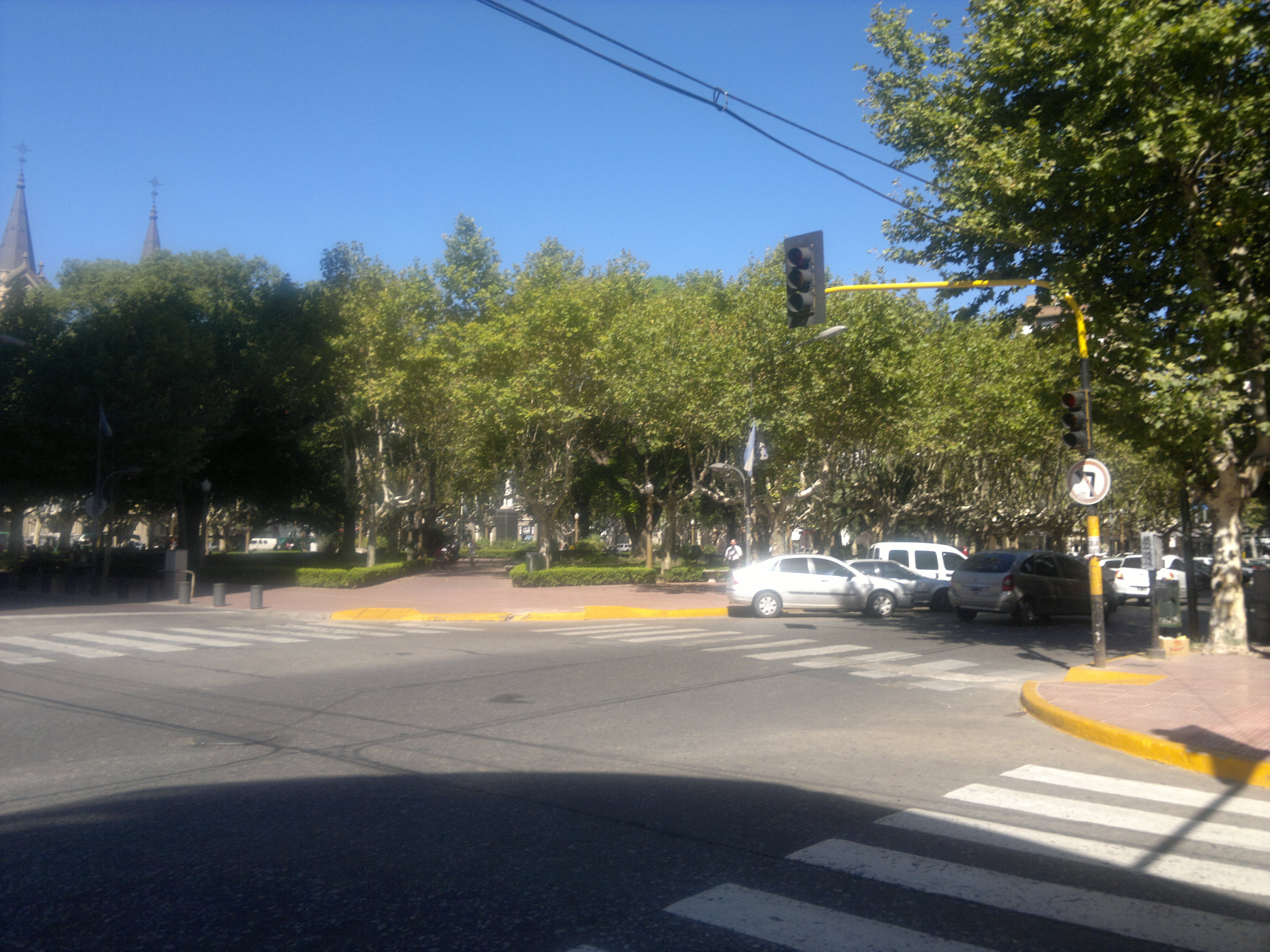
Mitre Square

The city is bordered by San Isidro and Tigre. Its continental area is composed of the towns of Virreyes, San Fernando and Victoria. The rest of its jurisdiction comprises the second and third sections of the Paraná Delta Islands.

=== Climate ===
Climate data for San Fernando, Buenos Aires (1991–2020, extremes 1995–present)
Month	Jan	Feb	Mar	Apr	May	Jun	Jul	Aug	Sep	Oct	Nov	Dec	Year
Record high °C (°F)	41.2 (106.2)	36.8 (98.2)	34.7 (94.5)	33.3 (91.9)	30.6 (87.1)	28.3 (82.9)	29.8 (85.6)	35.0 (95.0)	34.1 (93.4)	36.3 (97.3)	35.6 (96.1)	39.4 (102.9)	41.2 (106.2)
Mean daily maximum °C (°F)	29.5 (85.1)	28.2 (82.8)	26.2 (79.2)	22.7 (72.9)	18.9 (66.0)	16.2 (61.2)	15.4 (59.7)	17.7 (63.9)	19.3 (66.7)	22.1 (71.8)	25.4 (77.7)	28.3 (82.9)	22.5 (72.5)
Daily mean °C (°F)	24.6 (76.3)	23.5 (74.3)	21.5 (70.7)	17.8 (64.0)	14.2 (57.6)	11.2 (52.2)	10.6 (51.1)	12.5 (54.5)	14.5 (58.1)	17.6 (63.7)	20.6 (69.1)	23.0 (73.4)	17.6 (63.7)
Mean daily minimum °C (°F)	19.3 (66.7)	18.7 (65.7)	16.7 (62.1)	13.1 (55.6)	9.8 (49.6)	6.9 (44.4)	6.2 (43.2)	7.8 (46.0)	9.6 (49.3)	12.8 (55.0)	15.3 (59.5)	17.5 (63.5)	12.8 (55.0)
Record low °C (°F)	9.9 (49.8)	7.5 (45.5)	4.9 (40.8)	1.6 (34.9)	−3.4 (25.9)	−5.0 (23.0)	−4.0 (24.8)	−5.4 (22.3)	−0.8 (30.6)	2.0 (35.6)	3.3 (37.9)	6.2 (43.2)	−5.4 (22.3)
Average precipitation mm (inches)	114.4 (4.50)	122.6 (4.83)	119.2 (4.69)	106.2 (4.18)	81.3 (3.20)	52.5 (2.07)	68.6 (2.70)	70.7 (2.78)	78.6 (3.09)	111.8 (4.40)	113.7 (4.48)	104.3 (4.11)	1,143.9 (45.04)
Average precipitation days (≥ 0.1 mm)	7.5	7.2	6.8	7.5	6.0	5.3	5.9	6.2	6.4	8.3	7.4	7.7	82.2
Average snowy days	0.0	0.0	0.0	0.0	0.0	0.0	0.1	0.1	0.0	0.0	0.0	0.0	0.1
Average relative humidity (%)	66.0	70.7	73.6	76.9	80.3	79.7	78.3	74.4	71.2	70.9	66.6	64.6	72.8
Source: Servicio Meteorológico Nacional

=== Surface area ===
- Continental section: 23 km^{2} (8.9 sq mi)
- Delta section: 950 km^{2} (370 sq mi) (approx.)

=== Distances ===
- 28 km from the City of Buenos Aires.
- 95 km from the City of La Plata.

== Population ==
- Total population: 151,131
- Urban population: 147,409
- Rural population (delta): 3,058

=== Population by localities ===
- San Fernando: 68,806
- Victoria: 40,461
- Virreyes: 38,142
- Delta: 3,058

== Education ==
Buenos Aires International Christian Academy, an English-only Christian International school in Argentina, is located in San Fernando.
