= Martín Ortega =

Argentine footballer

Personal information
- Full name: Martín Yamir Ortega
- Date of birth: 20 August 1999 (age 27)
- Place of birth: Quilmes, Buenos Aires, Argentina
- Height: 1.83 m (6 ft 0 in)
- Position: Right-back

Team information
- Current team: Newell's Old Boys
- Number: 6

Youth career
- Quilmes

Senior career*
Years	Team	Apps	(Gls)
2019–2022	Quilmes	60	(3)
2022–2025	Tigre	65	(3)
2026–	Newell's Old Boys	9	(0)
- * Club domestic league appearances and goals as of 17:13, 11 September 2026 (UTC)

Martín Yamir Ortega (born 20 August 1999) is an Argentine professional footballer who plays as a right-back for Newell's Old Boys.

== Career ==
=== Quilmes ===
Ortega came through the youth setup at Quilmes and made his debut on 28 November in a Primera Nacional game against Santamarina, which Quilmes lost 1–0. He scored his first professional goal in a 3–1 win against Chacarita Juniors on 22 June 2021.

=== Tigre ===
On 8 July 2022, he signed for Liga Profesional club Tigre. He scored his first goal for the club on 26 February 2024 in a Copa de la Liga Profesional game against Vélez Sarsfield. After infrequent appearances in his first two seasons, he established himself in the team in 2024, with his performances leading him to being linked to European clubs including Sevilla and Cagliari. With his contract set to expire on 31 December 2025, he was unable to agree an extension and was left out of the team while it went unresolved. He left at the end of the year and was rumoured to be on Racing Club's shortlist to replace Facundo Mura.

=== Newell's Old Boys ===
After several months without a club, he joined Newell's Old Boys on 3 March 2026. He made his debut on 17 March in a 5–0 defeat against Lanús, in which he gave away a penalty after a handball.

== Career statistics ==
As of 10 September 2026

Appearances and goals by club, season and competition
Club	Season	League			Cup (Note: Includes Copa Argentina)		Continental		Other		Total	
Club	Season	Division	Goals	Apps	Apps	Goals	Apps	Goals	Apps	Goals	Apps	Goals
Quilmes	2020	Primera Nacional	7	0	—		—		—		7	0
Quilmes	2021	Primera Nacional	33	2	—		—		—		33	2
Quilmes	2022	Primera Nacional	20	1	—		—		—		20	1
Quilmes	Total		60	3	0	0	0	0	0	0	60	3
Tigre	2022	Liga Profesional	9	0	1	0	—		1 (Note: Appearances in Trofeo de Campeones)	0	11	0
Tigre	2023	Liga Profesional	14	0	—		3 (Note: Appearances in Copa Sudamericana)	0	—		17	0
Tigre	2024	Liga Profesional	29	2	1	0	—		—		30	2
Tigre	2025	Liga Profesional	13	1	1	0	—		—		14	1
Tigre	Total		65	3	3	0	3	0	1	0	72	3
Newell's Old Boys	2026	Liga Profesional	9	0	—		—		—		9	0
Career total			134	6	3	0	6	0	1	0	144	6
