= Santiago González =

Santiago González may refer to:

- Santiago González Bonorino (born 1975), Argentine rugby union player
- Santiago González (footballer, born 1992), Uruguayan football player
- Santiago González (footballer, born 1999), Argentine football player
- Santiago González (footballer, born 2003), Argentine football player
- Santiago González Iglesias (born 1988), Argentine rugby union player
- Santiago González Larraín (born 1956), Chilean engineer and government minister
- Santiago González Portillo (1818–1887), president of El Salvador in 1871–1876
- Santiago González Soto (born 1961), Mexican journalist and politician
- Santiago González (tennis) (born 1983), Mexican tennis player

== See also ==
- Luz M. Santiago González (born 1957), Puerto Rican politician
