= Jabes Saralegui =

Argentine footballer

Personal information
- Full name: Jabes Esteban Saralegui
- Date of birth: 12 April 2003 (age 23)
- Place of birth: General Ramírez, Entre Ríos, Argentina
- Height: 1.81 m (5 ft 11 in)
- Position: Midfielder

Team information
- Current team: Tigre (on loan from Boca Juniors)
- Number: 10

Youth career
- 2009–2014: Club Atlético y Deportivo Roma
- Club Atlético Unión
- Racing Club
- 2016–2022: Boca Juniors

Senior career*
Years	Team	Apps	(Gls)
2023–	Boca Juniors	32	(1)
2025–	→ Tigre (loan)	53	(2)
- * Club domestic league appearances and goals as of 17:47, 9 November 2026 (UTC)

Jabes Esteban Saralegui (born 12 April 2003) is an Argentine professional footballer who plays as a midfielder for Tigre, on loan from Boca Juniors.

== Career ==
Saralegui began his career at the age of six at Club Atlético y Deportivo Roma in his hometown, before signing for Club Atlético Unión in 2014. He later played in the youth teams of Racing Club before receiving an offer from Argentinos Juniors, which his father rejected. He later tried out for River Plate, but the move did not go through.

In 2016, he joined the youth setup at Boca Juniors, but was unable to sign for the club due to the transfer window being closed. Despite this, the club invited him to play in a few friendly matches and, after playing in a youth tournament, he joined the club's youth academy aged 13.

During the 2023 Copa Proyección, he was the team's top scorer, netting 3 goals in 9 matches. On 9 September, he started the 2023 Under-20 Intercontinental Cup final against AZ Alkmaar, which Boca won 4–1 in a penalty shootout after the game ended 1–1. He made his first team debut on 24 October, starting in a 2–1 defeat to Racing Club in the Copa de la Liga Profesional. Four days later, he played his first home game in a 0–0 draw against Estudiantes, being substituted for Valentín Barco after 60 minutes.

On 4 April 2024, he made his debut in continental competition as he started in a 0–0 against Nacional Potosí in the opening game of that year's Copa Sudamericana. He scored his first goal for the club on 1 August in the 95th minute of a 3–0 win over Banfield, after he came on as a substitute for Exequiel Zeballos in the 67th minute. On 7 September, he made his Copa Argentina against Talleres, coming on for Agustín Martegani. After a draw, the game went to a penalty shootout and Saralegui converted his spot kick as Boca won 8–7.

On 1 February 2025, he was loaned to Tigre until the end of the year, with an option to buy. He made his debut on 3 February in a 1–0 win against Unión Santa Fe, coming on as a substitute for Julián López in the 56th minute. He scored his first goal for the club 8 days later in another 1–0 win, this time over Racing Club. On 15 January 2026, Tigre announced that his loan was extended for another year, still retaining the buy option.

== Career statistics ==
As of 5 February 2026

Appearances and goals by club, season and competition
Club	Season	League			Cup (Note: Includes Copa Argentina)		Continental		Other		Total	
Club	Season	Division	Goals	Apps	Apps	Goals	Apps	Goals	Apps	Goals	Apps	Goals
Boca Juniors	2023	Liga Profesional	4	0	—		—		—		4	0
Boca Juniors	2024	Liga Profesional	28	1	2	0	8 (Note: Appearances in Copa Sudamericana)	0	—		38	1
Boca Juniors	Total		32	1	2	0	8	0	0	0	42	1
Tigre (loan)	2025	Liga Profesional	29	2	4	1	—		—		33	3
Tigre (loan)	2026	Liga Profesional	3	0	—		—		—		3	0
Tigre (loan)	Total		32	2	4	1	0	0	0	0	36	3
Career total			64	3	6	1	8	0	0	0	78	4
