= Edgardo Luis Paruzzo =

Argentine footballer (1954–2024)

- Paruzzo in the 1980s

Personal information
- Full name: Edgardo Luis Paruzzo
- Date of birth: 17 August 1954
- Place of birth: Roque Sáenz Peña, Chaco, Argentina
- Date of death: 2 September 2024 (aged 70)
- Place of death: San Fernando, Buenos Aires, Argentina
- Position: Forward

Youth career
- 1958–?: Rosario Central

Senior career*
Years	Team	Apps	(Gls)
1975	Concepción		(26)
1976–1979	Quilmes		
1979	Altos Hornos Zapla		
1980–1981	Tigre		
1981–1982	Atlético Bucaramanga	19	(6)
1982–1989	Tigre		
1989–1990	Almirante Brown		
1990–1992	San Miguel		
- * Club domestic league appearances and goals

Edgardo Luis Paruzzo (17 August 1954 – 2 September 2024) was an Argentine footballer who played as a forward. Nicknamed "Paru", he was primarily associated with playing for Tigre throughout the 1980s, contributing greatly to the club's performance throughout the decade to the point of being the club's third all-time scorer and a historical figure for the club.

== Career ==
Paruzzo was born on 17 August 1954 in Presidencia Roque Sáenz Peña. At the age of only 4, he would play for the youth sector of Rosario Central where he played for three years but did make it to the senior team. He briefly considered quitting football in favor for a banking career, but he then played for Concepción after being contacted to play for them where despite only playing a single season in the 1975 Argentine Primera División, he scored 26 goals. This caught the attention of Quilmes beginning in 1976 where he was part of the winning squad for the 1978 Campeonato Metropolitano and subsequently played in the 1979 Copa Libertadores.

He then briefly played for Altos Hornos Zapla where he competed in the 1979 Campeonato Nacional before arriving to play for Tigre beginning in the 1980 Argentine Primera División where he made his official debut for the club on 10 February 1980 in a match against Ferro Carril Oeste where he also scored his first goal for the club. Even in his initial years in the club, Paruzzo was valued for being able to score goals in any position that was available to him. This culminated in a 7–1 victory over Defensores de Belgrano where he scored five consecutive goals in the same match on 1 August 1981. After briefly going beyond borders to play for Colombian-based club Atlético Bucaramanga for six months where he scored 6 goals in 19 matches, he returned to play for Tigre in 1982 and for the next few years of his career, he was part of the main goalscoring lineup alongside Walter Fiori and Rolando Chaparro. Paruzzo was the main goal scorer in the 1986, 1987, 1988 and 1989 seasons with his hundredth goal being against Estación Quequén in 1988 during the 1988–89 Primera B Nacional with that tournament being the final one he had with the club with his final match being on 29 April 1989 against Temperley. His final record for the club had him make 345 appearances for the club with 105 goals scored, making him the third highest scorer in the club's history. He spent rest of 1989 and the first half of 1990 playing for Almirante Brown as his final years as a player were from 1990 to 1992 playing for San Miguel before retiring.

== Death ==
Paruzzo died at a clinic in San Fernando, Buenos Aires on 2 September 2024, at the age of 70.
