= Sebastián Medina =

Argentine footballer

Personal information
- Full name: Sebastián Luciano Emanuel Medina
- Date of birth: 15 March 2000 (age 26)
- Place of birth: Clorinda, Formosa, Argentina
- Height: 1.76 m (5 ft 9 in)
- Position: Attacking midfielder

Team information
- Current team: Tigre
- Number: 21

Youth career
- 2013–2020: River Plate

Senior career*
Years	Team	Apps	(Gls)
2020–2023	Guillermo Brown	30	(1)
2022	→ Patronato (loan)	37	(4)
2023–	Tigre	69	(3)
- * Club domestic league appearances and goals as of 17:52, 9 November 2026 (UTC)

Sebastián Luciano Emanuel Medina (born 15 March 2000) is an Argentine professional footballer who plays as an attacking midfielder for Tigre.

== Career ==
=== Guillermo Brown ===
Medina came through the youth setup at River Plate, before joining Primera Nacional club Guillermo Brown.

==== Loan to Patronato ====
On 2 February 2022, he joined Liga Profesional club Patronato on loan. In the Copa Argentina semi-final that year against Boca Juniors, he assisted Marcelo Estigarribia's goal in a 1–1 draw in regular time before they went on to win in the penalty shootout. He then started in the final, as Patronato beat Talleres 1–0.

=== Tigre ===
Ahead of the 2023 season, he permanently joined Tigre. On 19 October 2024, he scored the third goal in a 3–0 win against Boca Juniors, which was Fernando Gago's managerial debut for Boca. On 28 March 2025, he scored the winner in a 2–1 victory over Defensa y Justicia. In added time in a game against Barracas Central on 20 October, he scored an equaliser in the third minute of second half stoppage time in a 2–2 draw.

== Career statistics ==
As of 3 March 2026

Appearances and goals by club, season and competition
Club	Season	League			Cup (Note: Includes Copa Argentina)		Continental		Other		Total	
Club	Season	Division	Goals	Apps	Apps	Goals	Apps	Goals	Apps	Goals	Apps	Goals
Guillermo Brown	2020	Primera Nacional	7	0	—		—		—		7	0
Guillermo Brown	2021	Primera Nacional	23	1	—		—		—		23	1
Guillermo Brown	Total		30	1	0	0	0	0	0	0	30	1
Patronato (loan)	2022	Liga Profesional	37	4	5	0	—		—		42	4
Tigre	2023	Liga Profesional	13	0	1	0	3 (Note: Appearances in Copa Sudamericana)	0	—		17	0
Tigre	2024	Liga Profesional	17	1	0	0	—		—		17	1
Tigre	2025	Liga Profesional	27	2	3	0	—		—		30	2
Tigre	2026	Liga Profesional	5	0	0	0	—		—		5	0
Tigre	Total		62	3	4	0	3	0	0	0	69	3
Career total			129	8	9	0	3	0	0	0	141	8

== Honours ==
Patronato

- Copa Argentina: 2022
