= Felipe Zenobio =

Argentine footballer

Personal information
- Full name: Felipe Tomás Zenobio
- Date of birth: 22 May 2000 (age 26)
- Place of birth: Tigre, Argentina
- Height: 1.83 m (6 ft 0 in)
- Position: Goalkeeper

Team information
- Current team: Tigre
- Number: 12

Youth career
- Tigre

Senior career*
Years	Team	Apps	(Gls)
2020–	Tigre	104	(0)
2023	→ Agropecuario (loan)	13	(0)
- * Club domestic league appearances and goals as of 17:49, 9 November 2026 (UTC)

Felipe Tomás Zenobio (born 22 May 2000) is an Argentine professional footballer who plays as a goalkeeper for Tigre.

== Club career ==
He signed his first professional contract with Tigre on 30 September 2020, running until the end of December 2023. After an injury to Gonzalo Marinelli, Zenobio made his professional debut on 22 October in the Copa Libertadores where, despite losing 5–0 to Palmeiras, he saved a penalty from Luiz Adriano. He began to receive starts in the Primera Nacional in 2021 and, by 18 May, he went 699 minutes without conceding a goal. On 29 June, his contract was renewed until December 2025. In 2021, he was part of the side that won the Primera Nacional and achieved promotion to the Liga Profesional.

He initially struggled for game time in the top flight and was thus loaned out to Primera Nacional club Agropecuario on 26 January 2023. Upon his return to Tigre in 2024, he started his first game on 13 April in a 1–0 defeat against Unión Santa Fe. He soon established himself as the starting goalkeeper, before extending his contract on 3 January 2026 until the end of 2029. In 2026, he was a key part of the team as Tigre reached the round of 16 in the Copa Sudamericana.

== Career statistics ==
As of 2 October 2026

Appearances and goals by club, season and competition
Club	Season	League			Cup (Note: Includes Copa Argentina)		Continental		Other		Total	
Club	Season	Division	Apps	Goals	Apps	Goals	Apps	Goals	Apps	Goals	Apps	Goals
Tigre	2020	Primera Nacional	0	0	—		1 (Note: Appearances in Copa Libertadores)	0	—		1	0
Tigre	2021	Primera Nacional	13	0	—		—		—		13	0
Tigre	2022	Liga Profesional	0	0	—		—		—		0	0
Tigre	2024	Liga Profesional	26	0	—		—		—		26	0
Tigre	2025	Liga Profesional	35	0	3	0	—		—		38	0
Tigre	2026	Liga Profesional	24	0	2	0	10 (Note: Appearances in Copa Sudamericana)	0	—		36	0
Tigre	Total		98	0	5	0	11	0	0	0	114	0
Agropecuario (loan)	2023	Primera Nacional	13	0	—		—		—		13	0
Career total			111	0	5	0	11	0	0	0	127	0

== Honours ==
Tigre

- Primera Nacional: 2021
