= Chaco Martínez =

Argentine footballer (born 1999)

Personal information
- Full name: Braian Miguel Angel Martínez
- Date of birth: 18 August 1999 (age 27)
- Place of birth: Pampa del Infierno, Argentina
- Height: 1.60 m (5 ft 3 in)
- Position: Forward

Team information
- Current team: Everton (on loan from Independiente)

Youth career
- 2016–2020: Independiente

Senior career*
Years	Team	Apps	(Gls)
2020–	Independiente	64	(5)
2022	→ Aldosivi (loan)	29	(1)
2024	→ Everton (loan)	14	(4)
2025	→ Tigre (loan)	13	(2)
2026–	→ Everton (loan)	0	(0)
- * Club domestic league appearances and goals as of 17:36, 27 December 2025 (UTC)

Braian Miguel Angel "Chaco" Martínez (born 18 August 1999) is an Argentine professional footballer who plays as a forward for Everton de Viña del Mar, on loan from Independiente.

== Professional career ==
Martínez joined the youth academy of in 2016 Independiente. On 9 August 2019, he signed his first contract with Independiente. Martínez made his professional debut with Independiente in a 2-1 Argentine Primera División loss to River Plate on 19 January 2020.

On 2 February 2022, Martínez joined Aldosivi on a loan until the end of 2022.

In January 2024, Martínez joined Chilean Primera División side Everton on a loan for a year with an option to buy. He returned to them on loan in January 2026.
