= David Romero (footballer) =

Argentine footballer

Personal information
- Full name: José David Romero
- Date of birth: 25 March 2003 (age 23)
- Place of birth: Corrientes, Argentina
- Height: 1.79 m (5 ft 10 in)
- Position: Forward

Team information
- Current team: Parma
- Number: 9

Youth career
- 2017–2019: Talleres

Senior career*
Years	Team	Apps	(Gls)
2019–2026	Talleres	35	(4)
2024	→ Unión La Calera (loan)	11	(7)
2025	→ Tigre (loan)	20	(5)
2026	Tigre	12	(7)
2026–	Parma	4	(2)

International career
2019	Argentina U16		(1)
- * Club domestic league appearances and goals as of 15:19, 20 September 2026 (UTC)

José David Romero (born 25 March 2003), known as David Romero, is an Argentine footballer who plays as a forward for Serie A club Parma.

== Club career ==
Born in Corrientes, Argentina, Romero came to the Talleres de Córdoba youth system in 2017 and signed his first professional contract in March 2019, aged 18. He made his debut in the 2021 Copa Sudamericana match against Deportes Tolima on 28 April 2021.

In the second half of 2024, Romero moved on loan to Chile and joined Unión La Calera in the top division. He scored two goals in his debut against Palestino on 18 August.

On 14 August 2026, Romero signed a five-year contract with Parma in Italy.

== International career ==
In 2019, Romero was included in the Argentina under-16 squad for the Mondial Football Montaigú in France. He scored one goal against Portugal and Argentina became the champions.

Romero was called up to a training session of Argentina U20 under Javier Mascherano in July 2022.
