= San Fernando Partido =

San Fernando Partido de San Fernando
- Partido
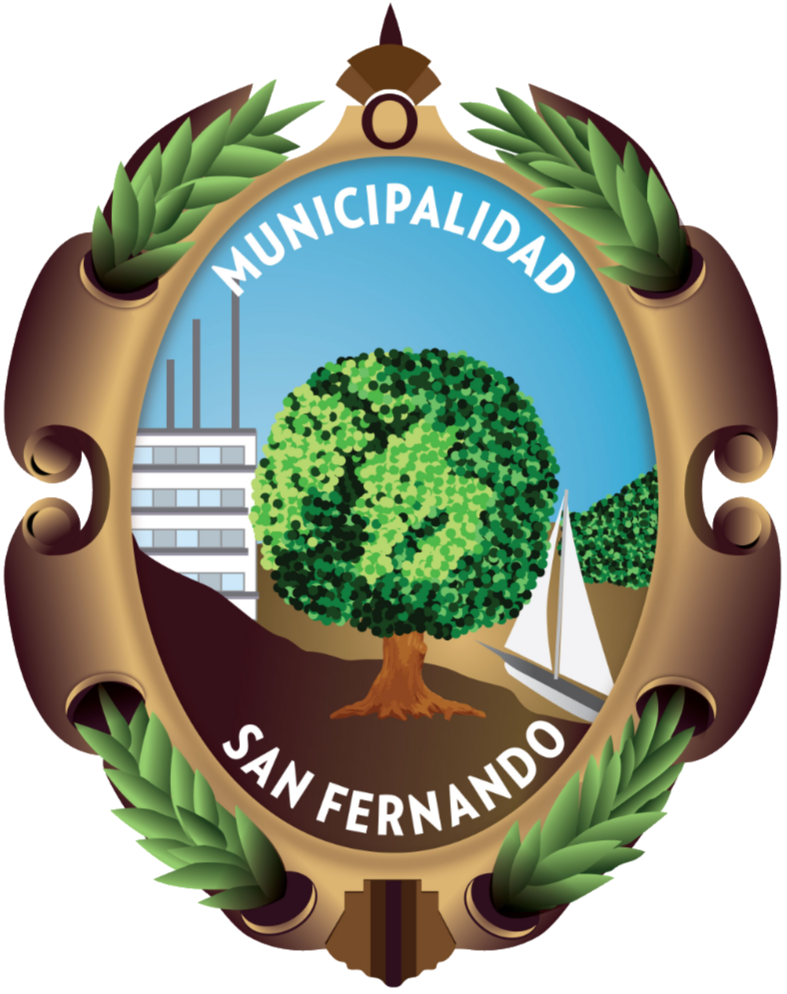
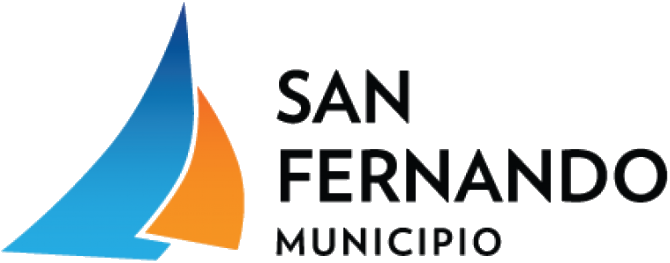
- Coat of arms Logo
- Location of San Fernando
- Location of continental part of San Fernando Partido in Greater Buenos Aires and Buenos Aires Province
- Coordinates: 34°27′S 58°34′W
- Country: Argentina
- Seat: San Fernando

Government
  - Intendant: Juan Andreotti (FR-FdT)

Area
  - Total: 950 km^{2} (370 sq mi)

Population
  - Total: 163,240
  - Density: 170/km^{2} (450/sq mi)
- Demonym: sanfernandino/a
- Postal Code: B1646
- IFAM: BUE114
- Area Code: 011
- Patron saint: Nuestra Señora de Aránzazu
- Website: www.sanfernando.gob.ar

San Fernando is a partido of Buenos Aires Province, Argentina, in the north of Greater Buenos Aires. Its capital is San Fernando. It is twenty-eight kilometers from the city of Buenos Aires.

== Population distribution (2010) ==
Of the 163,240 inhabitants recorded in the 2010 census, the distribution is:

- San Fernando: 76,726
- Victoria: 44,959
- Virreyes: 38,599
