= Diego Sosa (footballer, born 1997) =

Argentine footballer

Personal information
- Full name: Diego Alejandro Sosa
- Date of birth: 28 July 1997 (age 29)
- Place of birth: Buenos Aires, Argentina
- Height: 1.77 m (5 ft 10 in)
- Position: Left-back

Team information
- Current team: Instituto
- Number: 3

Youth career
- Tigre

Senior career*
Years	Team	Apps	(Gls)
2016–2026	Tigre	90	(4)
2017–2018	→ U. Española (loan)	14	(0)
2023	→ Racing de Montevideo (loan)	34	(1)
2024	→ Peñarol (loan)	19	(1)
2026–	Instituto	16	(1)
- * Club domestic league appearances and goals as of 18:00, 10 May 2026 (UTC)

Diego Alejandro Sosa (born 28 July 1997) is an Argentine footballer who plays for Instituto.
