= Matías Pérez Acuña =

Argentine footballer

Matías Pérez
Personal information
- Full name: Matías Pérez Acuña
- Date of birth: 9 February 1994 (age 32)
- Place of birth: Buenos Aires, Argentina
- Height: 1.80 m (5 ft 11 in)
- Position: Right back

Team information
- Current team: Almirante Brown

Youth career
- –2013: Vélez Sarsfield

Senior career*
Years	Team	Apps	(Gls)
2013–2018	Vélez Sarsfield	38	(1)
2016–2017	→ Quilmes (loan)	26	(1)
2018–2021	Tigre	26	(1)
2021–2022	Delfín SC	0	(0)
2021	→ Estudiantes BA (loan)	8	(0)
2022	Rapid București	2	(0)
2022–2023	Badajoz	21	(0)
2023–2024	Ordino	7	(0)
2024	CSM Alexandria	9	(0)
2025–	Almirante Brown	7	(1)
- * Club domestic league appearances and goals as of 18:12, 29 June 2025 (UTC)

Matías Pérez Acuña (born 9 February 1994) is an Argentine footballer who plays as a right full back for Almirante Brown.

== Career ==
Pérez Acuña played as a centre back in Vélez Sarsfield's youth divisions and debuted professionally in a 3–2 away victory against Rosario Central for the 2013 Inicial, replacing Fabián Cubero as right full back. He was the 32nd youth player who debuted in Vélez under Ricardo Gareca's coaching. The defender was an unused substitute in Vélez' victory over Arsenal de Sarandí for the 2013 Supercopa Argentina.

In an interview in 2014, the retired Argentine international right full back Javier Zanetti stated that Pérez Acuña was the best young player in his position of the Argentine league.

== Honours ==
Vélez Sarsfield

- Supercopa Argentina: 2013

Tigre

- Copa de la Superliga: 2019
- Trofeo de Campeones runner-up: 2019
