= Blas Armoa =

Paraguayan footballer (born 2000)

Personal information
- Full name: Blas Esteban Armoa Núñez
- Date of birth: 3 February 2000 (age 26)
- Place of birth: Luque, Paraguay
- Height: 1.77 m (5 ft 10 in)
- Position: Winger

Team information
- Current team: Gimnasia Mendoza (on loan from Tigre)
- Number: 27

Youth career
- Sportivo Luqueño

Senior career*
Years	Team	Apps	(Gls)
2017–2023	Sportivo Luqueño	95	(14)
2020–2021	→ Juárez (loan)	16	(0)
2022	→ Tigre (loan)	21	(8)
2023–	Tigre	82	(6)
2026–	→ Gimnasia Mendoza (loan)	7	(1)

International career
2017	Paraguay U17	6	(1)
2017	Paraguay U18	1	(0)
2019	Paraguay U20	2	(0)
- * Club domestic league appearances and goals as of 16:43, 10 May 2026 (UTC)

Blas Esteban Armoa Núñez (born 3 February 2000) is a Paraguayan professional footballer who plays as a winger for Argentine Primera División club Gimnasia Mendoza, on loan from Tigre.

== Club career ==
A youth academy product of Sportivo Luqueño, Armoa made his professional debut on 4 April 2017 in Luqueño's 3–2 defeat against Club Libertad. He scored his first goal on 15 April 2017 in his club's 2–1 win against General Díaz.

== International career ==
Armoa is a former Paraguayan youth international. He has played for Paraguay youth national teams at 2017 South American U-17 Championship, 2017 FIFA U-17 World Cup and 2019 South American U-20 Championship.

Armoa was also part of under-23 team squad which competed at 2020 CONMEBOL Pre-Olympic Tournament.
