= Alan Barrionuevo =

Argentine professional footballer

Personal information
- Full name: Alan Enzo David Barrionuevo
- Date of birth: 2 January 1997 (age 29)
- Place of birth: Argentina
- Height: 1.88 m (6 ft 2 in)
- Position: Centre-back

Team information
- Current team: Tigre
- Number: 20

Youth career
- Almirante Brown

Senior career*
Years	Team	Apps	(Gls)
2017–2025	Almirante Brown	133	(10)
2022	→ Central Córdoba SdE (loan)	5	(0)
2024	→ Deportivo Riestra (loan)	38	(3)
2025–	Tigre	45	(3)
- * Club domestic league appearances and goals as of 17:51, 9 November 2026 (UTC)

Alan Enzo David Barrionuevo (born 2 January 1997) is an Argentine professional footballer who plays centre-back for Tigre, on loan from Almirante Brown.

== Career ==
Barrionuevo started his career with Almirante Brown. He made his professional debut in Primera B Metropolitana on 6 May 2017 when he was selected off the bench in place of Josimar Mosquera during a 1–0 win over Tristán Suárez. In the following campaign, 2017–18 Primera B Metropolitana, Barrionuevo made the first three starts of his career in fixtures against San Miguel, Estudiantes and Barracas Central.

On 1 June 2022 it was confirmed that Barrionuevo would join Argentine Primera División club Central Córdoba SdE on a loan until the end of June 2023 with a purchase option.

== Career statistics ==
As of 19 April 2019.

Appearances and goals by club, season and competition
Club	Season	League			Cup		League Cup		Continental		Other		Total	
Club	Season	Division	Apps	Goals	Apps	Goals	Apps	Goals	Apps	Goals	Apps	Goals	Apps	Goals
Almirante Brown	2016–17	Primera B Metropolitana	1	0	0	0	—		—		0	0	1	0
Almirante Brown	2017–18	Primera B Metropolitana	4	0	0	0	—		—		0	0	4	0
Almirante Brown	2018–19	Primera B Metropolitana	7	0	0	0	—		—		0	0	7	0
Career total			12	0	0	0	—		—		0	0	12	0
