= Martín Garay =

Argentine professional footballer

Héctor Martín Garay
Personal information
- Full name: Héctor Martín Garay
- Date of birth: 12 June 1999 (age 27)
- Place of birth: Mina Clavero, Argentina
- Height: 1.67 m (5 ft 6 in)
- Positions: Right winger; right-back

Team information
- Current team: Tigre
- Number: 8

Youth career
- 2016–2017: Estudiantes

Senior career*
Years	Team	Apps	(Gls)
2017–2023	Estudiantes BA	79	(5)
2021	→ Patronato (loan)	26	(1)
2022	→ Atlético Tucumán (loan)	34	(0)
2023–	Tigre	96	(2)
- * Club domestic league appearances and goals as of 17:47, 9 November 2026 (UTC)

Héctor Martín Garay (born 12 June 1999) is an Argentine football player who plays as right winger or right-back for Tigre.

== Career ==
Garay's senior career started with Primera B Metropolitana team Estudiantes at the age of eighteen. He made his debut on 30 June 2017 during a league draw away from home against Colegiales, having replaced Federico Pellegrino off the bench with eighteen minutes remaining. His first start came in the succeeding season, 2017–18, in a goalless home draw with Acassuso on 5 December, while his first senior goal occurred in the final game of the campaign against UAI Urquiza on 15 May 2018. 2018–19 saw Estudiantes win promotion to Primera B Nacional, with Garay scoring once across twenty-four fixtures for the club.

Garay scored twice, versus Barracas Central and Temperley respectively, in his first six appearances at second tier level. After twenty-five matches and one more goal across two seasons in Primera Nacional, Garay departed on loan in February 2021 to Primera División side Patronato; penning terms until the succeeding December. Before leaving, the midfielder renewed his contract until the end of 2023 with El Pincha. He debuted in a 1–0 defeat away to Defensa y Justicia on 26 February.

On 13 January 2023, Garay signed permanently for Tigre.

== Career statistics ==
As of 11 December 2021.

Appearances and goals by club, season and competition
Club	Season	League			Cup		League Cup		Continental		Other		Total	
Club	Season	Division	Apps	Goals	Apps	Goals	Apps	Goals	Apps	Goals	Apps	Goals	Apps	Goals
Estudiantes	2016–17	Primera B Metropolitana	1	0	0	0	—		—		0	0	1	0
Estudiantes	2017–18	Primera B Metropolitana	23	1	0	0	—		—		0	0	23	1
Estudiantes	2018–19	Primera B Metropolitana	24	1	1	0	—		—		0	0	25	1
Estudiantes	2019–20	Primera Nacional	20	2	4	0	—		—		0	0	24	2
Estudiantes	2020	Primera Nacional	11	1	0	0	—		—		0	0	11	1
Estudiantes	2021	Primera Nacional	0	0	0	0	—		—		0	0	0	0
Estudiantes	Total		79	5	5	0	—		—		0	0	84	5
Patronato (loan)	2021 (Note: Soccerway counts Copa de la Liga Profesional appearances as league appearances.)	Primera División	16	1	10	0	—		0	0	0	0	26	1
Patronato (loan)	Total		16	1	10	0	—		—		0	0	26	1
Career total			95	6	15	0	—		0	0	0	0	110	6
