= Javier Toledo =

Argentine footballer

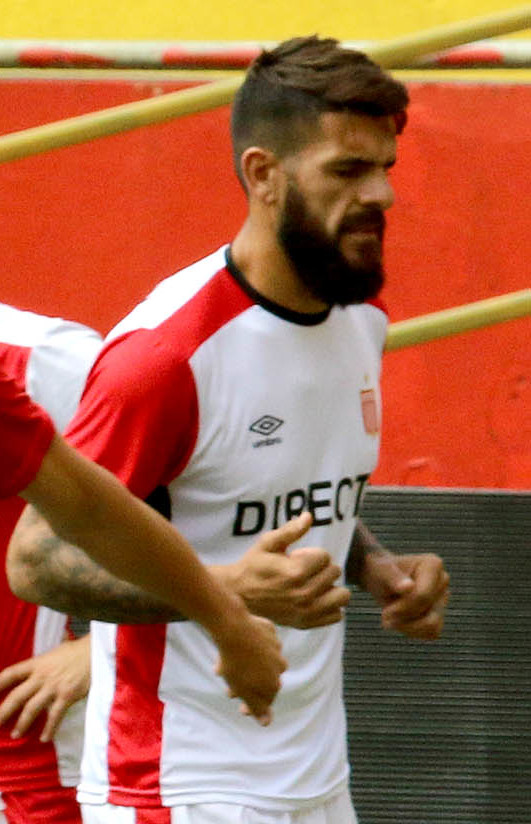
- Toledo at the 2017 Copa Libertadores

Personal information
- Full name: Javier Fabián Toledo
- Date of birth: April 24, 1986 (age 40)
- Place of birth: Marcos Juárez, Argentina
- Height: 1.90 m (6 ft 3 in)
- Position: Forward

Team information
- Current team: Temperley

Youth career
- 2002: Castro FC
- 2003–2004: Chacarita

Senior career*
Years	Team	Apps	(Gls)
2005–2007	Chacarita	41	(7)
2007	Sarmiento	20	(10)
2008	Cuenca	16	(3)
2008	Chacarita	28	(15)
2009–2010	Al-Ahli	15	(8)
2010	Paranaense	3	(0)
2010–2013	Rosario Central	64	(17)
2013–2014	Colo-Colo	11	(1)
2014	Peñarol	7	(1)
2014–2015	Lobos BUAP	13	(3)
2015–2016	San Martín SJ	22	(9)
2016–2017	Estudiantes	19	(5)
2017	Sol de América	16	(8)
2018–2021	Atlético Tucumán	64	(14)
2021	Sol de América	16	(4)
2022–2023	Sarmiento	59	(11)
2023–2024	Colón	47	(7)
2025–	Temperley	12	(0)
- * Club domestic league appearances and goals as of 17:46, 27 June 2025 (UTC)

Javier Fabián Toledo (born 24 April 1986 in Marcos Juárez, Córdoba) is an Argentine footballer who plays for Temperley.

== Career ==
Toledo began his career in the youth side for Chacarita and in January 2005 he was promoted to the Primera División Argentina team. After two years he left Chacarita Juniors to sign in February 2007 with Club Atlético Sarmiento, here he played one year then signed in January 2008 with the Ecuadorian top club Deportivo Cuenca. He played in the Serie A de Ecuador a half year with Deportivo Cuenca and in summer 2008 returned to his youth club Chacarita Juniors. In summer 2009 he left Chacarita and signed with the Saudi Professional League team Al-Ahli (Jeddah). On 2 February 2010 the Argentinean striker signed with Paranaense until December 2010.
