= Ignacio Russo =

Argentine footballer

Personal information
- Full name: Ignacio Russo Cordero
- Date of birth: 13 December 2000 (age 25)
- Place of birth: Rosario, Argentina
- Height: 1.75 m (5 ft 9 in)
- Position: Forward

Team information
- Current team: Tigre
- Number: 29

Youth career
- Gimnasia de Rosario
- ADIUR
- 2016–2020: Rosario Central

Senior career*
Years	Team	Apps	(Gls)
2020–2026	Rosario Central	7	(1)
2022	→ Chacarita Jrs. (loan)	33	(9)
2023	→ Patronato (loan)	33	(7)
2024	→ Instituto (loan)	38	(6)
2025	→ Tigre (loan)	35	(10)
2026–	Tigre	32	(8)
- * Club domestic league appearances and goals as of 17:57, 9 November 2026 (UTC)

Ignacio Russo Cordero (born 13 December 2000) is an Argentine professional footballer who plays as a forward for Tigre.

== Career ==
Russo started out in Rosario with Gimnasia y Esgrima, before later heading to ADIUR. 2016 saw the forward join Rosario Central. Before his breakthrough into the first-team, he scored three goals in twenty-eight matches for the academy and five goals in nineteen games for the reserves. Russo moved into the senior set-up in late-2020, initially appearing on the substitute's bench for fixtures with River Plate and Banfield in the Copa de la Liga Profesional. It was in that competition that he made his debut, as he featured for the final sixteen minutes of a draw away to Banfield on 4 December; having replaced Alan Bonansea.

On 11 January 2022, Russo joined Primera Nacional club Chacarita Juniors on a one-year loan deal.

== Personal life ==
Russo is the son of manager and former footballer Miguel Ángel Russo.

== Career statistics ==
As of 5 December 2020

Appearances and goals by club, season and competition
Club	Season	League			National cup		League cup		Continental		Other		Total	
Club	Season	Division	Apps	Goals	Apps	Goals	Apps	Goals	Apps	Goals	Apps	Goals	Apps	Goals
Rosario Central	2020–21 (Note: Soccerway counts Copa de la Liga Profesional appearances as league appearances.)	Argentine Primera División	1	0	0	0	0	0	—		0	0	1	0
Career total			1	0	0	0	0	0	—		0	0	1	0
