= Virreyes, Buenos Aires =

Virreyes
- Town
- Location in Greater Buenos Aires
- Coordinates: 34°27′S 58°32′W
- Country: Argentina
- Province: Buenos Aires
- Partido: San Fernando
- Elevation: 11 m (36 ft)

Population (2001 census [INDEC])
  - Total: 39,507
- CPA Base: B 1646
- Area code: +54 11

Virreyes is a town located in the San Fernando Partido of Buenos Aires Province, Argentina. It forms part of the Greater Buenos Aires urban conurbation.

== See also ==
- San Fernando Partido
