= Nahuel Banegas =

Argentine professional footballer

Personal information
- Full name: Nahuel Eugenio Banegas
- Date of birth: 6 October 1996 (age 30)
- Place of birth: Benavídez, Argentina
- Height: 1.76 m (5 ft 9 in)
- Position: Left-back

Team information
- Current team: Independiente (on loan from Tigre)
- Number: 5

Youth career
- Tigre

Senior career*
Years	Team	Apps	(Gls)
2018–2019	Puerto Nuevo	26	(1)
2019–2021	Villa Dálmine	17	(0)
2020–2021	→ Central Córdoba SdE (loan)	6	(0)
2021–2024	Central Córdoba SdE	17	(1)
2023	→ San Martín Tucumán (loan)	34	(4)
2024–2026	San Martín Tucumán	19	(3)
2024–2025	→ Tigre (loan)	30	(1)
2026–	Tigre	13	(0)
2026–	→ Independiente (loan)	1	(0)
- * Club domestic league appearances and goals as of 17:19, 3 October 2026 (UTC)

Nahuel Eugenio Banegas (born 6 October 1996) is an Argentine professional footballer who plays as a left-back for Argentine Primera Division club Independiente, on loan from Tigre.

== Career ==
Banegas came through the youth ranks at Tigre. In July 2018, Banegas departed to Primera D Metropolitana with Puerto Nuevo. One goal in twenty-six matches followed in 2018–19. July 2019 saw the left-back head to Villa Dálmine of Primera B Nacional. His first appearance came in a victory over Instituto on 17 August, which preceded a further sixteen matches for the club. On 31 August 2020, Banegas was loaned to Primera División side Central Córdoba SdE with a purchase option. He made his debut in a home defeat to Independiente in the Copa de la Liga Profesional on 1 November.

On 16 August 2021, Central Córdoba triggered the purchase option on Banega, signing him on a permanently deal until the end of 2023.

== Career statistics ==
As of 2 December 2020

Appearances and goals by club, season and competition
Club	Season	League			National cup		League cup		Continental		Other		Total	
Club	Season	Division	Apps	Goals	Apps	Goals	Apps	Goals	Apps	Goals	Apps	Goals	Apps	Goals
Puerto Nuevo	2018–19	Primera D Metropolitana	26	1	0	0	—		—		0	0	26	1
Villa Dálmine	2019–20	Primera B Nacional	17	0	0	0	—		—		0	0	17	0
Villa Dálmine	2020	Primera B Nacional	0	0	0	0	—		—		0	0	0	0
Villa Dálmine	Total		17	0	0	0	—		—		0	0	17	0
Central Córdoba (loan)	2020–21 (Note: Soccerway counts Copa de la Liga Profesional appearances as league appearances.)	Primera División	2	0	0	0	0	0	—		0	0	2	0
Career total			45	1	0	0	0	0	0	0	0	0	45	1
