= Santiago González (footballer, born 2003) =

Argentine footballer (born 2003)

Personal information
- Full name: Santiago Iván González
- Date of birth: 3 May 2003 (age 23)
- Place of birth: General Pacheco, Argentina
- Height: 1.82 m (6 ft 0 in)
- Position: Midfielder

Team information
- Current team: Tigre
- Number: 27

Youth career
- 2013–2023: Tigre

Senior career*
Years	Team	Apps	(Gls)
2024–	Tigre	63	(1)
- * Club domestic league appearances and goals as of 17:56, 9 November 2026 (UTC)

Santiago Iván González (born 3 May 2003) is an Argentine professional footballer who plays as a midfielder for Tigre.

== Career ==
Born in General Pacheco, González was a youth product of Tigre, having joined the side at the age of ten. He made his senior debut with the reserve team in 2021, and signed his professional contract on 10 January 2024, being promoted to the first team.

González made his first team debut on 29 March 2024, starting in a 4–1 home loss to Belgrano, as the club was already eliminated from the 2024 Copa de la Liga Profesional. He became a regular starter in the 2024 Primera División season, and scored his first professional goal on 7 October, netting the winner in a 2–1 away success over Atlético Tucumán.

On 11 March 2025, already established as a first-choice, González renewed his contract until 2026.

== Career statistics ==
As of 22 August 2025

Appearances and goals by club, season and competition
Club	Season	League			National Cup		Continental		Other		Total	
Club	Season	Division	Apps	Goals	Apps	Goals	Apps	Goals	Apps	Goals	Apps	Goals
Tigre	2024	Primera División	24 (Note: Soccerway counts Copa de la Liga Profesional appearances as league appearances.)	1	0	0	—		—		24	1
Tigre	2025	Primera División	22	0	3	0	—		—		25	0
Career total			46	1	3	0	0	0	0	0	49	1
