= General Ramírez =

Coordinates: 32°11′S 60°12′W

- Municipality and village
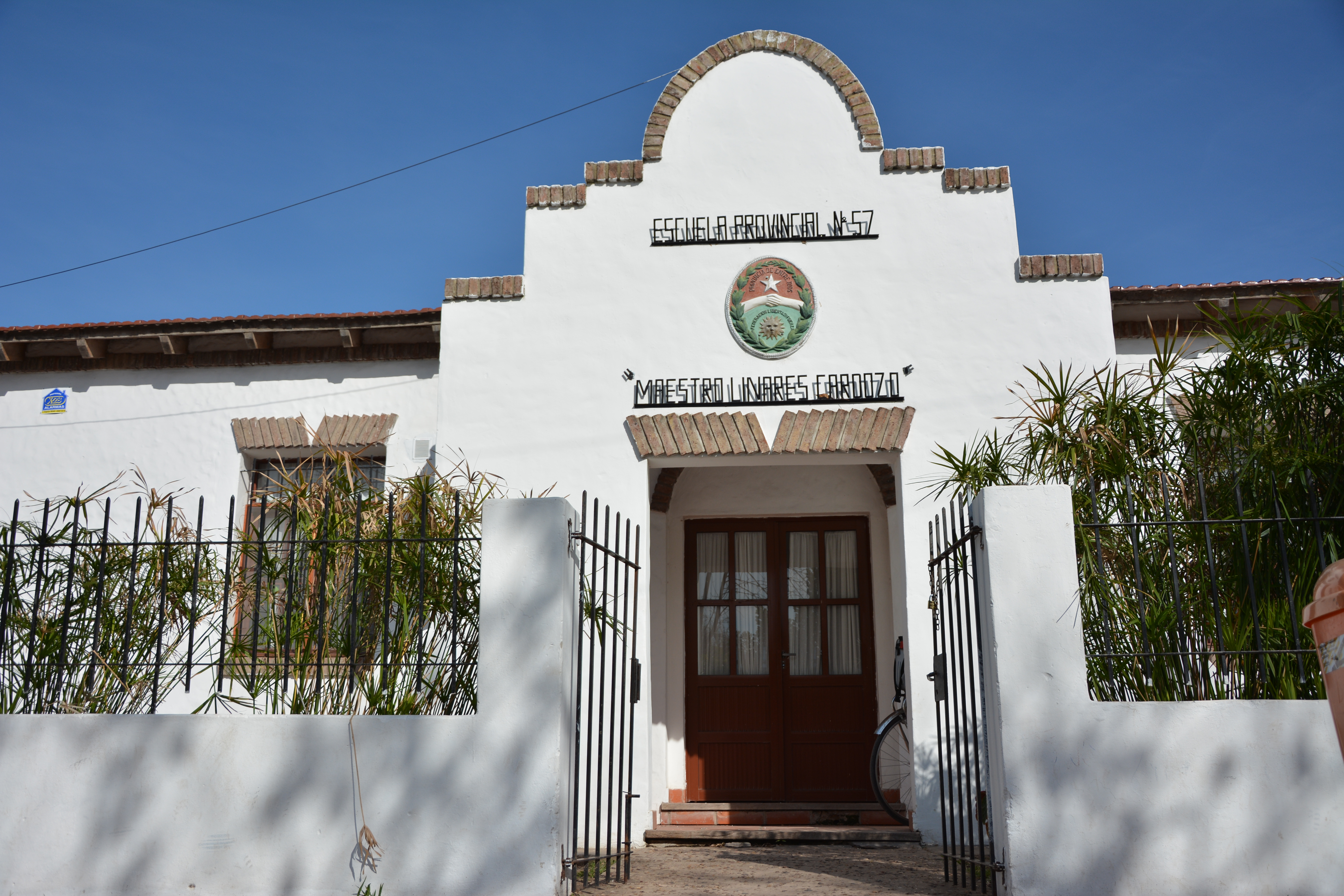
- Interactive map of General Ramírez
- Country: Argentina
- Province: Entre Ríos Province
- Time zone: UTC−3 (ART)

General Ramírez is a village and municipality in Entre Ríos Province in north-eastern Argentina.
