= Estadio José Dellagiovanna =

Football stadium in Victoria, Argentina

- Coliseo de Victoria

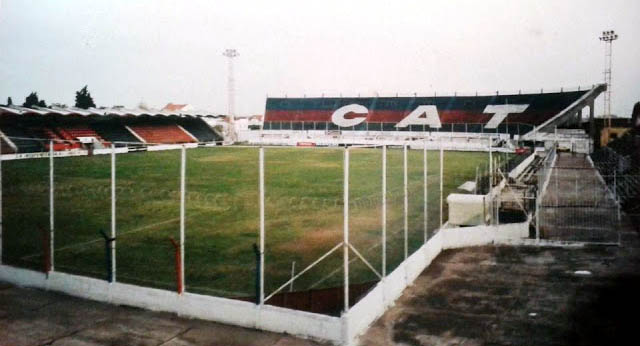
- Aerial view of the stadium in 2019
- Interactive map of Estadio José Dellagiovanna
- Full name: Estadio José Dellagiovanna
- Former names: Monumental de Victoria (1936–2009)
- Address: Av. Pres. Perón 2698; Victoria, Buenos Aires; Argentina
- Coordinates: 34°26′58″S 58°32′32″W
- Owner: Club Atlético Tigre
- Capacity: 26,282
- Surface: Grass
- Field size: 101 x 68 m

Construction
- Opened: September 20, 1936
- Renovated: 1955, 2006

Tenant
- Tigre (1936–present)

Estadio José Dellagiovanna (popularly known as the Coliseo de Victoria) is a stadium in Victoria, Buenos Aires, Argentina. It is the home venue of Club Atlético Tigre and was inaugurated in 1936. The stadium has a current capacity of 26,282 people.

The stadium also features a lighting system consisting of 4 towers with 13 spotlights each (2000 w) and 18 press booths. Its name honors José Dellagiovanna, former player and first president of C.A. Tigre, since 2009.

== History ==
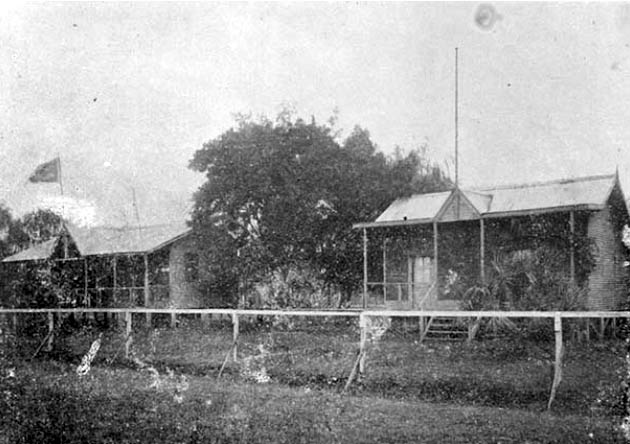
Tigre's former venue, Cancha del Lechero Ahogado, c. 1922

Prior to the construction of its own venue, Tigre played their home matches at neighbor Club San Fernando stadium. In December 1913 the club moved to a field on Rocha and Río de las Conchas in Rincón de Milberg district of Tigre Partido. That venue was popularly known as Lechero Ahogado ("drowned milkman") due to an urban legend based on the frequent river floodings. (Note: According to chronicles of that time, "there was no milkman drowned". It was a humorous metaphor to refer to the stadium's pitch because water did not drain when it rained so people used to say that "a milkman had drowned" there. The field's drain system would be later fixed.) The nickname was attributed to Uruguayan journalist Alfredo Palacio.

In February 1932 the stadium featured new grandstands, expanding its capacity. Nevertheless, its location made it difficult for spectators to access. In December 1935, Tigre acquired a more accessible land on Guido and Spano streets in the neighboring town of Victoria (5 km to the southeast). There the club began to build a new stadium, which was inaugurated on 20 September 1936 in a friendly match v Boca Juniors, won by the Zeneixes 4–1.

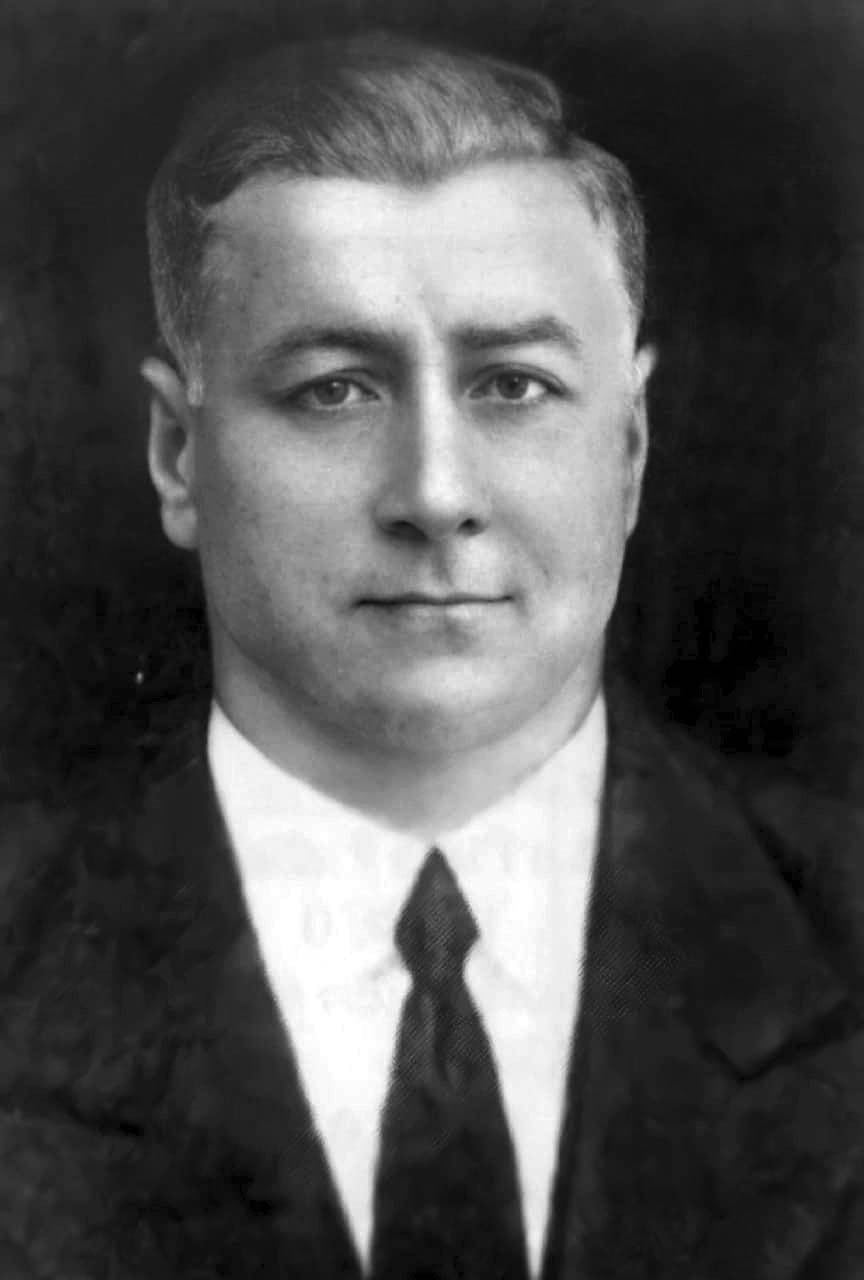
José Dellagiovanna, first president of Tigre. The stadium was named after him

New wooden grandstands (25 x 4 mt each) were added to one of the end sides on 11 de Septiembre Avenue in 1940. Two years later, a wooden stand was placed on another side. Concrete grandstands were first put in 1955, but the total of wooden structures would not been replaced until 2006.

The stadium did not have a name, being known as "Monumental de Victoria". In 2009 members of the club's executive committee voted for a name. José Dellagiovanna, who was not only Tigre's first president but player, treasurer, and manager of the club, won by 61%. Other names voted were Juan Marvezzi (all-time top scorer), and legendary Bernabé Ferreyra, among others.

Tigre drew an average home attendance of 16,325 in the 2024 Argentine Primera División.

== Events ==
Juan Perón was named Honorary President of the club in 1944. Raúl Alfonsín gave a speech at the stadium in 1983, prior to the general election that proclaimed him as president of Argentina. The club also hosted some concerts such as Pappo (1991), Damas Gratis (2019), Ratones Paranoicos, Los Nocheros, and Horacio Guarany.

== Gallery ==
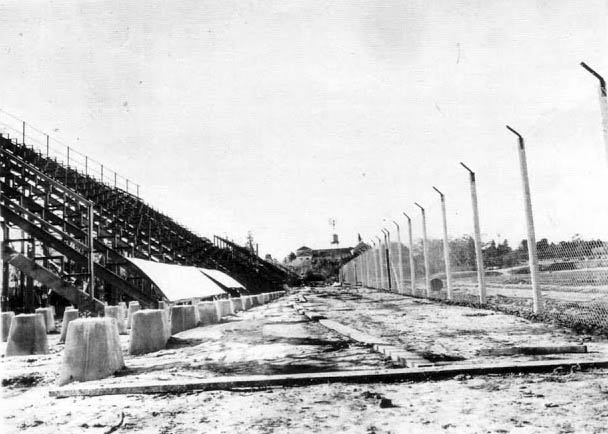
Under construction, 1936

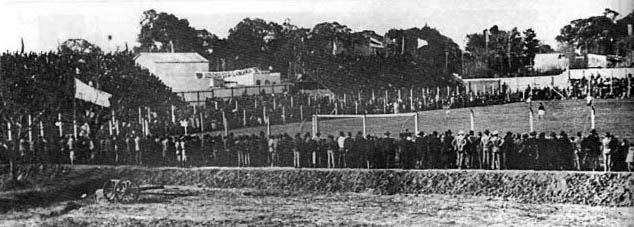
During a football match, 1936

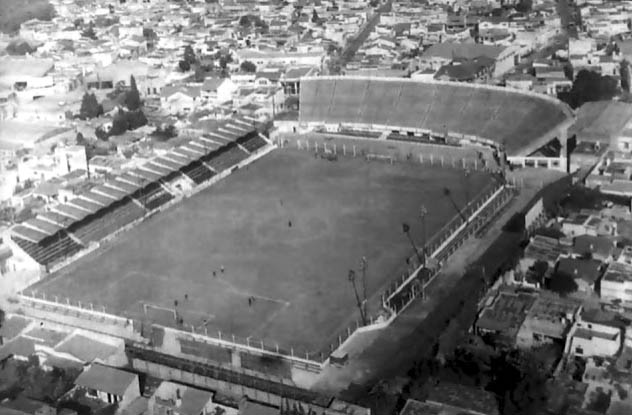
Aerial view, 1981

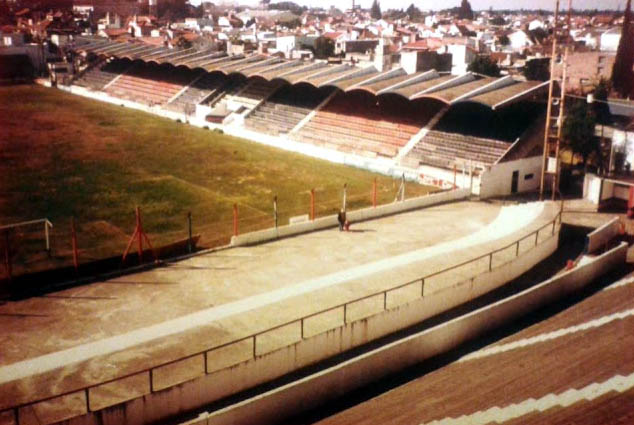
Roof stand, 1981

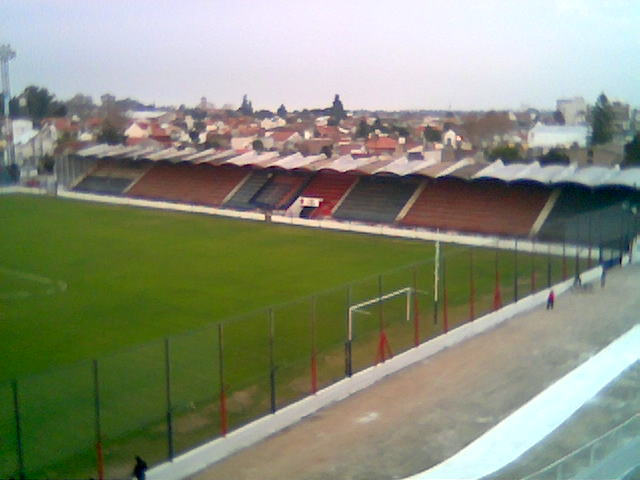
Roof stand, 2009
