= Victoria, Buenos Aires =

Victoria
- District
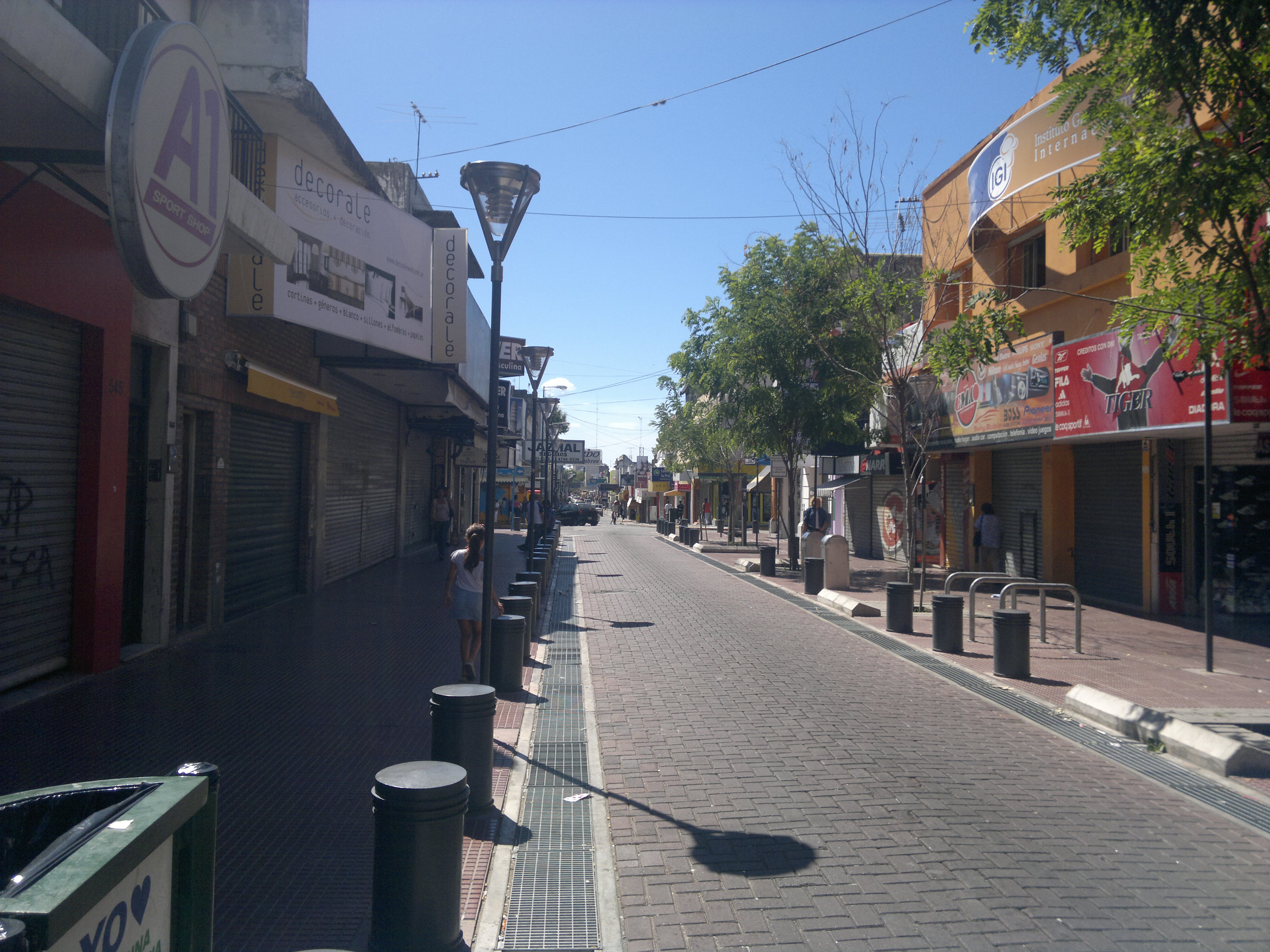

- Location in Greater Buenos Aires
- Coordinates: 34°27′S 58°34′W
- Country: Argentina
- Province: Buenos Aires
- Partido: San Fernando
- Elevation: 11 m (36 ft)

Population (2010 census)
  - Total: 30,623
- CPA Base: B 1644
- Area code: +54 11

Victoria is a city in San Fernando Partido of the urban agglomeration of Greater Buenos Aires.

The city gradually grew around a railway station on the Ferrocarril Central Argentino, which had been named after Queen Victoria of the United Kingdom.

It is home to Universidad de San Andrés.

Victoria is the home town of Club Atlético Tigre football club which play at the Estadio José Dellagiovanna.

== See also ==
- San Fernando Partido
