= Club Atlético Tigre =

Association football club in Argentina

Tigre
- Full name: Club Atlético Tigre
- Nicknames: El Matador (The Killer); Azules del Norte (Northern Blues) Dueño de Zona Norte (Owner of the Northern Zone)
- Founded: 3 August 1902; 124 years ago
- Ground: Estadio José Dellagiovanna
- Capacity: 26,282
- Chairman: Martín Suárez
- Manager: Diego Dabove
- League: Primera División
- 2025: 9th of 30
- Website: catigre.com.ar
Home colours	Away colours

Club Atlético Tigre is an Argentine professional football club located in Victoria, Buenos Aires. Tigre currently plays in the Primera División, the top level of the Argentine football league system, having secured promotion as the 2021 Primera Nacional champion. Its name comes from Tigre, the city in which it was founded. Since its foundation in 1902, the club's colors have been blue and red. Due to its history, Tigre is considered the biggest and most important club in the northern part of the province of Buenos Aires.

Tigre plays its home venues at Estadio José Dellagiovanna (named after its first president), which has a capacity of 26,282 spectators.

== History ==
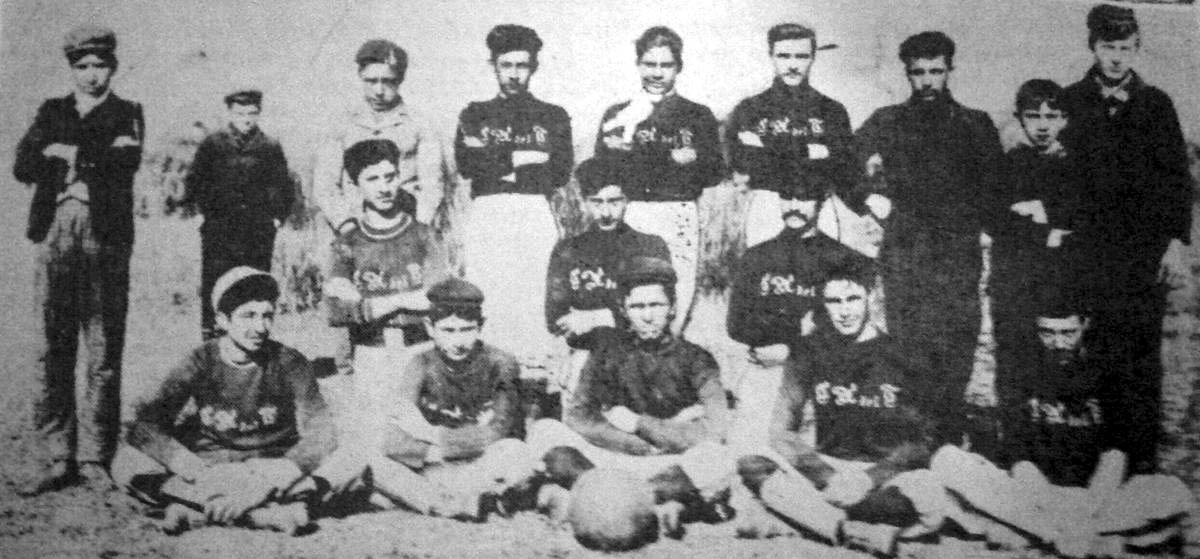
First team of Tigre, 1902

On 3 August 1902, a group of twelve young men led by José Dellagiovanna, met at his house in Partido de las Conchas (former name of Tigre Partido) with the purpose of establishing a sports club. The name given to the recently formed institution was "Club Atlético Juventud del Tigre", with Dellagiovanna elected as its first president. They played their first football match vs C.A. Las Conchas, won by Juventud del Tigre 3–1. The club wore a blue shirt with red collar, black short and socks.

In 1911, the team registered to the Argentine Football Association to be able to compete in official tournaments. By those times, the institution changed its name to "Club Atlético de Tigre". When dissident Federación Argentina de Football was established in 1912 after the first schism in Argentine football, Tigre affiliated to it. The team began to wear a striped blue and red shirt.

The first title won by the club came in 1912, when Tigre was crowned champion of División Intermedia (the second level by then), earning promotion to Primera División after beating Argentinos de Vélez Sarsfield 4–2 in the final held at Estadio G.E.B.A.

Tigre debuted in Primera División, the top division of Argentine football, on 1 May 1913 against Porteño; the match concluded in a 0–0 draw. The team played its home matches on a field located on Rocha street, near Reconquista River in Rincón de Milberg. Its first field was inaugurated on 2 December 1913. When a new schism came in 1919, Tigre registered to dissident Asociación Amateurs de Football, which lasted until 1927, when both leagues, AAmF and AFA joined.

In 1931, the first professional league of Argentina, Liga Argentina de Football, was created, with Tigre affiliating to it. Under professionalism, Tigre debuted on 31 May 1931 vs San Lorenzo at Estadio Viejo Gasómetro, and Tigre lost 4–2. Nevertheless, in 1934 a reduction in the number of Primera Division teams caused Tigre and Quilmes to be relegated into the Second Division. This meant Tigre left the top division after 21 consecutive seasons.

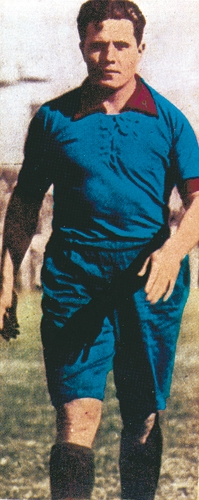
Bernabé Ferreyra, the first great player of the club

At the beginning of 1931, Tigre sold striker Bernabé Ferreyra to River Plate for m$n50,000. The transaction was described as "the most expensive pass for a player in the history of world football" by the local media. Ferreyra had played for Tigre during 6 years, with an average of +1 goal per game.

After the selling of Ferreyra, another forward, Juan Marvezzi, arrived to the club in 1937. He would score 116 goals over 173 matches between 1937 and 1943, becoming Tigre's all-time top scorer.

In October 1944, the club received then vice-president of Argentina, colonel Juan Domingo Perón, in front of a crowded stadium. The president of Tigre, Mario Piotti, appointed Perón –a confessed supporter of the club– as "honorary president" of the club.

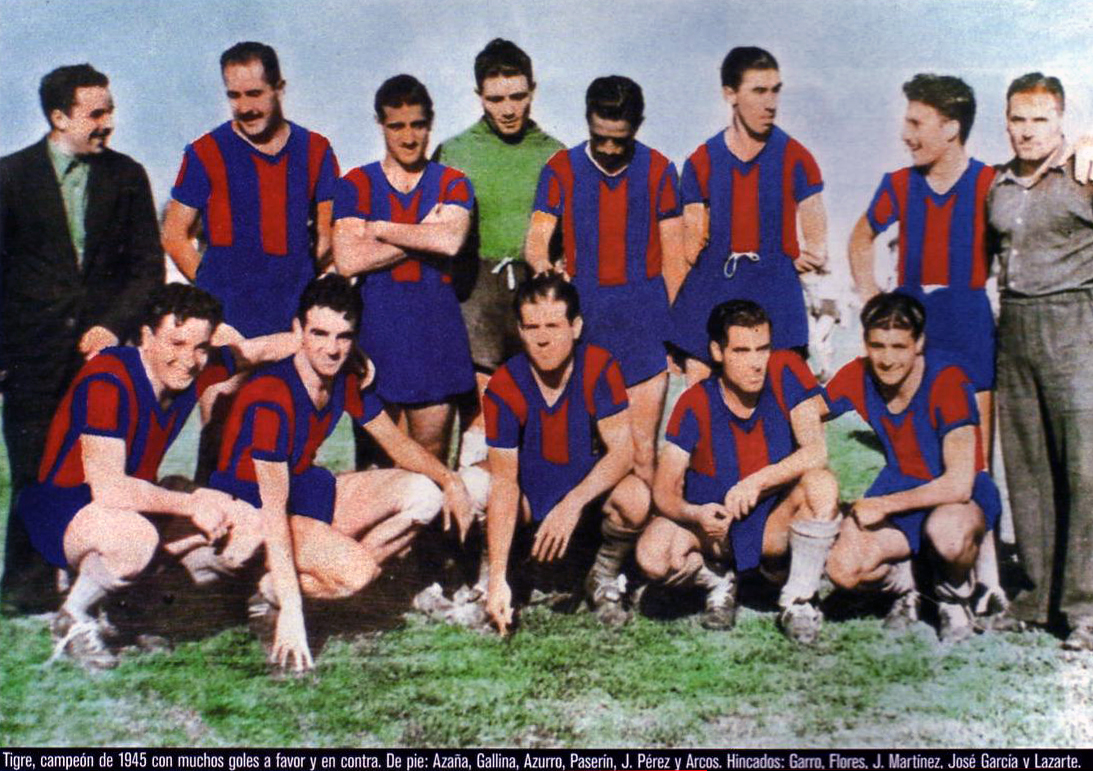
The 1945 team that won the Primera B title and achieved promotion to the Primera División

In 1945, Tigre won its first official title, the Second Division championship, which allowed the club to return to Primera. The club remained in the top level for a few seasons before being relegated again in 1950, along with Rosario Central.

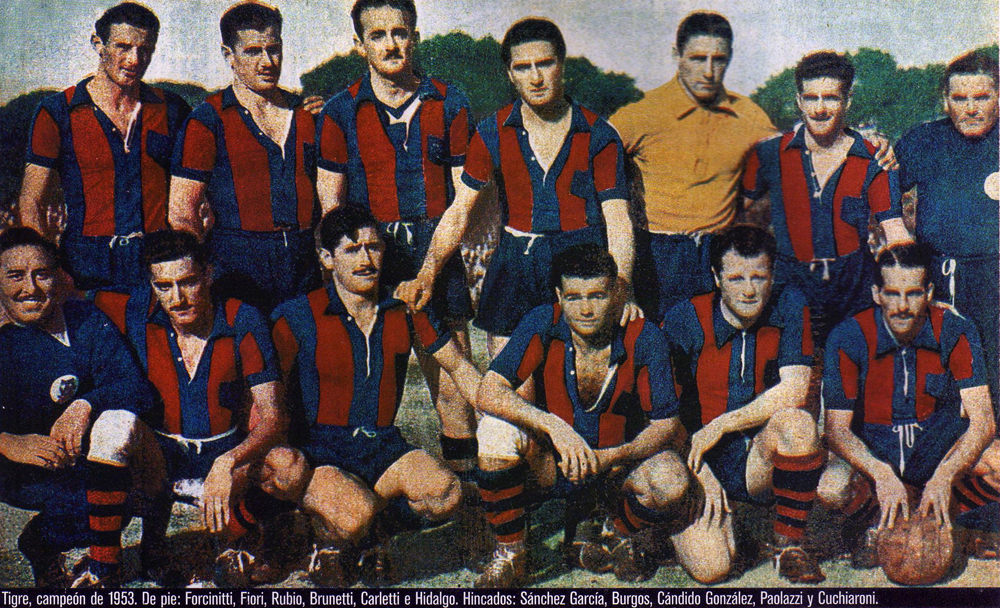
The 1953 that got another promotion to Primera that same year

Tigre remained in the second tier until 1953, when the team won its second title, and returned to Primera División again, where the club remained until another relegation in 1958. During that brief stint in the top level, Tigre got its best performance until then, finishing 6th in the 1955 season. It was at that time when Tigre was nicknamed El Matador (The Killer) by El Gráfico journalist Osvaldo Ardizzone.

Tigre returned to Primera División in 1967, after being promoted along with Club Atlético Los Andes in the "Reclasificatorio", a tournament contested by the last six teams of Metropolitano and the four top teams from Primera B. Nevertheless, the club would be relegated again, and in 1971 was sent to Primera C, the third division of Argentine by then.

In 1979, Tigre returned to Primera División, with Juan Carlos Lorenzo as the sports director. A curiosity of that year: while Tigre was on the rise, it sold more tickets than Racing Club, San Lorenzo de Almagro and Independiente. At national level, it finished 4th only behind Boca Juniors, River Plate and Rosario Central. The following season, after poor results, the club returned to the second tier

In 1982, Tigre and San Lorenzo set the attendance record in the second division. More than 70,000 tickets were sold for the match that was played at Estadio Monumental. As of today and by different regulations of AFA, it will hardly be exceeded at any time.

In 1991, the club was relegated into the third division (Primera B Metropolitana). In 1994, Tigre won the Clausura tournament of the Metropolitana, but lost the promotion final to the Apertura champion, Chacarita Juniors. Tigre was finally promoted to the Nacional B (Second tier) the following season, in 1995. However, the club only lasted there one season, and were directly relegated. In 1998, the club was promoted to Nacional B again, and was close to achieving promotion to the Primera Division the following season, but was eliminated in the playoffs.

In 2005, The team became two-time champion of the Primera B Metropolitana by winning both the Apertura and Clausura tournaments, with a record number of points obtained. In both tournaments, the team had only lost one match.

In the club's first season return in the second tier, the 2005–06 season, the club placed 7th in the overall table, one position away from qualifying for the playoffs. In the 2006–07 season, the club placed 5th in the overall table and got itself into the promotion playoffs, which was called the "Torneo Reducido". In the final, Tigre defeated Platense 2–0, which allowed the club to play the promotion playoff final. Tigre beat Nueva Chicago 3–1 over two legs, and would be able to play in the highest division of Argentine football after more than two decades.

In its first tournament on return, the 2007–08 season, Tigre finished runner-up of the Apertura tournament. The external factor to this campaign was the massive support; in almost all the matches of the tournament, Tigre sold out its tickets, both in Victoria and away from home. All this left the popular recognition in the football environment that Tigre had been widely the revelation of the tournament, and that Argentine football had recovered a great.

For the 2008 Apertura, Tigre was one goal away from becoming champion, but finished runner-up again. The club finished with a total of 39 points, tied for first place along with San Lorenzo and Boca Juniors, but ends as runner-up after playing a historic triangular final. It must be considered that the AFA modified, in the midst of their dispute, the rules of this tournament. Originally it had established that in the event of a tie for first place, the champion would be decided according to head-to-head results between the teams occupying that place. Tigre defeated San Lorenzo and Boca Juniors, both as visitors, so it was appropriate to award the club the title. However, with the imposed modification, the triangular had to be disputed.

In 2012 Clausura the club was runner-up in the Primera Division again. Tigre started the season thinking about not being in the relegation table, but ended up exceeding the expectations by fighting for the league title until the last date. At the end of that same year, after eliminating Colombian side Millonarios in the semifinals of the 2012 Copa Sudamericana, it reached its first international final in its history, where the club lost to São Paulo in the finals.

Despite having been relegated at the end of the 2018–19 Primera División championship, 2019 was the most successful year in the history of the club as Tigre won its first title in Primera División, the Copa de la Superliga, by beating Boca Juniors 2–0 in the final at Mario Kempes Stadium. Coached by Néstor Gorosito, Tigre's initial line-up was Gonzalo Marinelli; Matías Pérez Acuña, Gerardo Alcoba (c), Néstor Moiraghi, Nicolás Colazo; Sebastián Prediger, Lucas Menossi, Diego Alberto Morales, Walter Montillo, Lucas Janson; Federico González. The goals were scored by González and Janson. Besides, 20,000 supporters of El Matador travelled to Córdoba to attend the match.

That win allowed Tigre to play the Trofeo de Campeones vs Racing Club (winner of the 2018–19 league) at Estadio José María Minella in Mar del Plata. Nevertheless, Racing beat Tigre 2–0.

In 2020, Tigre was the only Argentine team that played the top continental competition, Copa Libertadores, that was not competing in the top division but in Primera B Nacional.

In November 2021, Tigre won the Primera Nacional title (also their first one in the division) after beating Barracas Central 1–0 in the final match. Therefore the Matador will play in the top division of Argentine professional football since the 2022 season.

== Kit evolution ==
During the first years of the club, the shirt was blue with a red collar. On the chest, the legend "Juventud del Tigre" (original club name). For the first game v C.A. Las Conchas, the team wore that shirt. A blue and red striped jersey appeared between 1911 and 1911, being alternated with the traditional blue.

With the affiliation to dissident "Asociación Amateurs de Football", in 1919, the regulation of the use of colors privileged San Lorenzo de Almagro in the use of a striped design. The now traditional blue with a red horizontal stripe began to be worn in the mid 1940s. During the 1960s, the club worn a blue and red hoops jersey that had been worn by Italian club Sampdoria.

== Stadium ==
Throughout its history, Club Atlético Tigre had 3 grounds, although the most popular is the current Estadio Jose Dellagiovanna, located in Victoria, Greater Buenos Aires.

In 1935 the land of Guido Spano was acquired and on 29 December the Foundation Stone was placed where the current Victoria stadium would be built. The land in front of the avenue was acquired with the certain possibility of expanding the number of supporters. Many internal struggles were generated by this determination. Former members, who did not understand at the time the perspective that this change offered to the club, decided to leave the institution. The president at that time was León Bourdieu.

It was inaugurated on 20 September 1936, in a friendly against Boca Juniors. On 27 September 1936, the first official match was played at the stadium, with Club Atlético Independiente beating Tigre 1-0 as part of the First Division league championship organized by the AFA. On 6 December, Tigre had its first victory at the stadium, defeating Ferro Carril Oeste 2–0.

== Players ==
=== Current squad ===
As of 23 September 2026

Note: Flags indicate national team as defined under FIFA eligibility rules; some limited exceptions apply. Players may hold more than one non-FIFA nationality.

No.	Pos.	Nation	Player
2	DF	ARG	Joaquín Laso (captain)
3	DF	ARG	Nahuel Banegas
4	DF	ARG	Valentín Moreno
5	MF	ARG	Bruno Leyes (on loan from Godoy Cruz)
7	MF	ARG	Simón Rivero (on loan from Boca Juniors)
8	DF	ARG	Martín Garay
10	MF	ARG	Jabes Saralegui (on loan from Boca Juniors)
11	MF	ARG	Tiago Serrago (on loan from River Plate)
12	GK	ARG	Felipe Zenobio
15	DF	ARG	Ángelo Marchese
16	MF	ARG	Nicolás Dubersarsky (on loan from Austin)
17	DF	CHI	Guillermo Soto (on loan from Universidad Católica)
18	FW	ARG	Manuel Fernández (on loan from Vélez Sarsfield)
19	FW	PAR	Alfio Oviedo

No.	Pos.	Nation	Player
20	DF	ARG	Alan Barrionuevo
21	MF	ARG	Sebastián Medina
22	FW	ARG	Santiago López (on loan from Independiente)
23	DF	ARG	Gonzalo Requena (on loan from Instituto)
24	DF	ARG	Federico Álvarez
25	MF	ARG	Ian Subiabre
26	GK	ARG	Lautaro Morales (on loan from Lanús)
27	MF	ARG	Santiago González
28	MF	ARG	Gonzalo Martínez
29	FW	ARG	Ignacio Russo
32	DF	ARG	Juan Villalba
33	FW	URU	Mauro Méndez
38	DF	ARG	Tomás Fernández
40	DF	ARG	Luciano Minniti
42	DF	URU	Ramón Arias

=== Reserve squad ===
Note: Flags indicate national team as defined under FIFA eligibility rules; some limited exceptions apply. Players may hold more than one non-FIFA nationality.

No.	Pos.	Nation	Player
1	GK	ARG	Luka Fuster
13	GK	ARG	Máximo Leguizamón
34	MF	ARG	Nicolás Afonso
35	FW	ARG	Jordan Andrusisen
36	MF	ARG	Lucian Carracedo
37	DF	ARG	Bautista Feversani
39	FW	ARG	Alejandro Medina
40	DF	ARG	Luciano Minniti
41	DF	ARG	Lucas Molas
43	FW	ARG	Benjamín Figueredo
44	MF	ARG	Gastón Pérez

No.	Pos.	Nation	Player
45	MF	ARG	Román Pesolilla
46	DF	ARG	Thiago Sanchez
47	MF	ARG	Alan Lezcano
48	DF	ARG	Román Saravia
49	FW	ARG	Brandon Leszczuk
50	MF	ARG	Ignacio Peluffo
51	FW	ARG	Santino Galesio
52	DF	ARG	Fabricio Córdoba
53	DF	ARG	Alex González
72	FW	PER	Marco Rivas

=== Out on loan ===
Note: Flags indicate national team as defined under FIFA eligibility rules; some limited exceptions apply. Players may hold more than one non-FIFA nationality.

No.	Pos.	Nation	Player
3	DF	ARG	Tomás Lecanda (at Agropecuario until 31 December 2026)
7	FW	ARG	Juan Cruz Esquivel (at Deportivo Morón until 31 December 2026)
11	FW	ARG	Darío Sarmiento (at Colón until 31 December 2026)
11	MF	ARG	Ezequiel Forclaz (at Estudiantes RC until 31 December 2026)
18	FW	PAR	Blas Armoa (at Gimnasia-M until 31 December 2026)

No.	Pos.	Nation	Player
22	DF	ARG	Brian Leizza (at Los Andes until 31 December 2026)
24	GK	ARG	Alan Sosa (at Patronato until 31 December 2026)
28	MF	ARG	Sebastián Sánchez (at Central Español until 31 December 2026)
31	DF	ARG	Federico Tévez (at Ferro Carril Oeste until 31 December 2026)
37	FW	ARG	Camilo Viganoni (at Los Andes until 31 December 2026)

== Player records ==
=== Most appearances ===
No.	Player	Pos.	Tenure	Match.
1	(Argentina) Martín Galmarini	MF	2002–08, 2010–13, 2014–2022	372
2	(Argentina) Pedro Pellegata	DF	1969–80	360
3	(Argentina) Adolfo Heisinger	FW	1914–29	346
4	(Argentina) Edgardo Luis Paruzzo	FW	1980–89	345
5	(Argentina) Juan Carlos Blengio	DF	2000–18	335

=== Top scorers ===
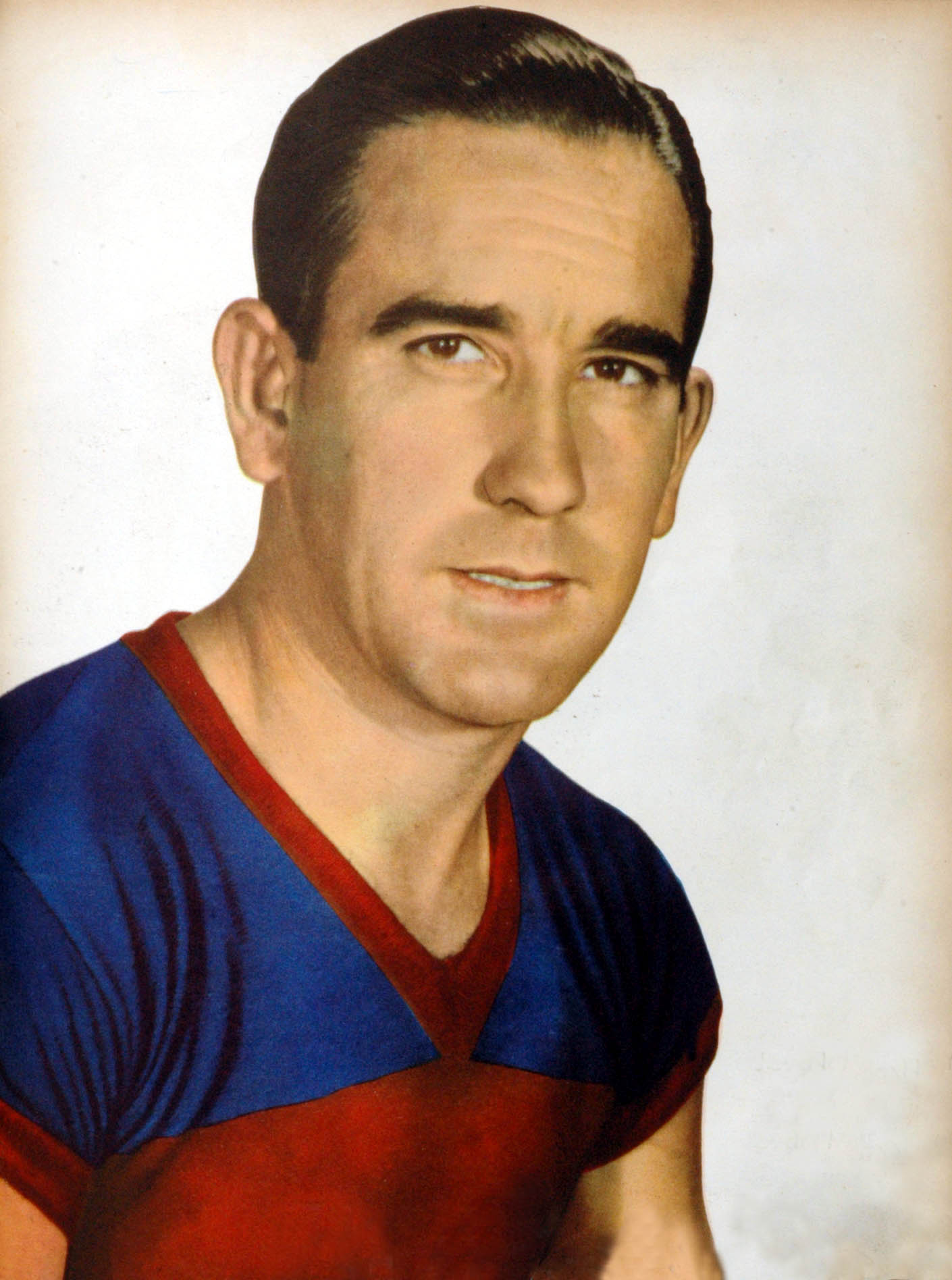
Juan Marvezzi, all-time top scorer for Tigre

No.	Player	Pos.	Tenure	Goals
1	(Argentina) Juan Marvezzi	FW	1937–43	116
2	(Argentina) Carlos Luna	FW	2004–05, 2008–10, 2011–12, 2014–2021	112
3	(Argentina) Edgardo Luis Paruzzo	FW	1980–89	105
4	(Argentina) Juan C. Haedo	FW	1924–34	91
5	(Argentina) Luis Cesáreo	FW	1948–60	81

== Managers ==
Last 10 managers of the football squad:

- (Argentina) Cristian Ledesma (2018)
- (Argentina) Mariano Echeverría (2018–2019)
- (Argentina) Néstor Gorosito (2019–2020)
- (Argentina) Juan Carlos Blengio (2020–2021)
- (Argentina) Diego Martínez (2021–2023)
- (Argentina) Juan Sara (2023)
- (Argentina) Lucas Pusineri (2023)
- (Argentina) Néstor Gorosito (2024)
- (Argentina) Sebastián Domínguez (2024)
- (Argentina) Diego Dabove (2025–)

== Honours ==
=== Official ===
- Copa de la Superliga (1): 2019
- Primera Nacional (1): 2021
- Primera B Metropolitana (4): 1945, 1953, 1979, 2004–05
- División Intermedia (1): 1912

=== Friendly ===
- Trofeo Jaime Sarlanga (1): 1967
- Torneo Preparación Copa Farrell (1): 1944
