= 2025 AFA Liga Profesional de Fútbol =

Liga Profesional de Fútbol
- Season: 2025
- Dates: 23 January – 13 December 2025
- Champions: Apertura: Platense (1st title); Clausura: Estudiantes (LP) (7th title); Campeón de Liga: Rosario Central (5th title)
- Relegated: Godoy Cruz; San Martín (SJ)
- Copa Libertadores: Platense; Estudiantes (LP); Rosario Central; Boca Juniors; Argentinos Juniors; Independiente Rivadavia (via Copa Argentina); Lanús (via Copa Sudamericana)
- Copa Sudamericana: River Plate; Racing; Deportivo Riestra; San Lorenzo; Tigre; Barracas Central
- Matches: 510
- Goals: 994 (1.95 per match)
- Top goalscorer: Apertura: Tomás Molina (10 goals); Clausura: Ronaldo Martínez (8 goals)
- Biggest home win: Atlético Tucumán 5–0 Sarmiento (J) (13 February 2025); Boca Juniors 5–0 Newell's Old Boys (5 October 2025)
- Biggest away win: Aldosivi 0–5 Defensa y Justicia (30 January 2025)
- Highest scoring: Barracas Central 3–3 Central Córdoba (SdE) (11 February 2025); Huracán 3–3 Aldosivi (5 April 2025); River Plate 4–2 Godoy Cruz (17 August 2025); Aldosivi 4–2 San Martin (SJ) (15 November 2025)
- Longest winning run: Boca Juniors (T. Apertura and T. Clausura); 6 games
- Longest unbeaten run: River Plate (10 T. Apertura, 8 T. Clausura); 18 games
- Longest winless run: Banfield (T. Apertura); Independiente (1 T. Apertura, 12 T. Clausura); 13 games
- Longest losing run: Four teams (T. Apertura and T. Clausura); 5 games

The 2025 Liga Profesional de Fútbol was the 135th season of top-flight professional football in Argentina. The league season began on 23 January and ended on 13 December 2025.

Thirty teams competed in the league: twenty-eight returning from the 2024 season as well as two promoted teams from the 2024 Primera Nacional (Aldosivi and San Martín (SJ)). Vélez Sarsfield were the defending champions, having won the 2024 Argentine Primera División tournament.

During the Torneo Apertura, the referee Yael Falcón Pérez suspended the match Godoy Cruz vs. Talleres (C) (4 February 2025, 3rd round) before the start of the second half after the assistant referee Diego Martín was hit on the head by an object thrown from the stands of the Estadio Víctor Legrotaglie. The AFA Disciplinary Court decided on 20 February 2025 to resume the match and play the second half on a date to be determined behind closed doors. Godoy Cruz were deducted three points and had to play six more games behind closed doors. They also had to pay the travel expenses of Talleres (C) and a fine. The match was resumed at Estadio Malvinas Argentinas on 22 March 2025. On 8 April 2025, the Court of Appeals returned the three points to Godoy Cruz and ended the punishment of the closed-door games.

On 21 April 2025, the AFA postponed three matches scheduled for that day in mourning for the death of Pope Francis. The postponed matches were played the following day. A moment of silence was also observed before the start of all matches scheduled to be played from 22 April to 27 April. Similarly, during the Torneo Clausura, the AFA postponed the Barracas Central v Boca Juniors match, which was scheduled for 11 October 2025, in mourning for Boca Juniors' manager Miguel Ángel Russo, who died on 8 October. A moment of silence was also observed before all matches scheduled between 9 and 12 October. The postponed match was played on 27 October.

Platense won their first national league championship on 1 June 2025, after defeating Huracán 1–0 in the Torneo Apertura Final. Estudiantes (LP) won their seventh first national league championship on 13 December 2025, by defeating Racing 5–4 in a penalty shootout after a 1–1 draw in extra time in the Torneo Clausura Final.

Additionally, the AFA created a new league title ("Campeón de Liga") and awarded Rosario Central retroactively for having been the team with the most points in the aggregate table. As the 2025 Tournament Rules stated that changes could be made (prior approval by the Executive Committee) with the season in progress president Claudio Tapia presented an initiative to award a league title to Rosario Central, which was approved and carried out by the committee in November. The title was awarded with retroactivity since this 2025 season and it was established by AFA that will be disputed in the future seasons too. The decision caused widespread controversy because the title was not included in the season's regulations, and Rosario Central did not win neither the Apertura nor the Clausura. Furthermore, the title was awarded while the Clausura tournament was still ongoing.

== Competition format ==
The competition format for this season consisted of two tournaments (Torneo Apertura and Torneo Clausura) each with five stages. In the first stage, the 30 teams were drawn into two groups or zones of fifteen teams each and played in a single round-robin format. In addition, each team played two inter-zone matches: the first against its rival from the other zone, and the second against a second team, determined by a draw. The top eight teams in each group advanced to the round of 16. The final stages (round of 16, quarter-finals, semi-finals and final) were played on a single-leg basis.

The winners of the Torneo Apertura and Torneo Clausura qualified for the 2026 Copa Libertadores as Argentina 1 and Argentina 2, respectively. Qualification for international tournaments was determined by the overall standings of the 2025 Primera División.

This season, two teams were relegated to the Primera Nacional. One team was relegated on the basis of coefficients, while the team that finished at the bottom of the 2025 aggregate table was also relegated.

== Club information ==
=== Stadia and locations ===
Locations of the 2025 Argentine Primera División teams outside Greater Buenos Aires.
Locations of the 2025 Argentine Primera División teams within Greater Buenos Aires.

Club	City	Stadium	Capacity
Aldosivi	Mar del Plata	José María Minella	35,180
Argentinos Juniors	Buenos Aires	Diego Armando Maradona	25,000
Atlético Tucumán	Tucumán	Monumental José Fierro	32,700
Banfield	Banfield	Florencio Sola	34,901
Barracas Central	Buenos Aires	Claudio "Chiqui" Tapia	4,400
Belgrano	Córdoba	Julio César Villagra	30,000
Boca Juniors	Buenos Aires	La Bombonera	54,000
Central Córdoba (SdE)	Santiago del Estero	Único Madre de Ciudades	30,000
Central Córdoba (SdE)	Santiago del Estero	Alfredo Terrera	16,000
Defensa y Justicia	Florencio Varela	Norberto "Tito" Tomaghello	12,000
Deportivo Riestra	Buenos Aires	Guillermo Laza	3,000
Estudiantes (LP)	La Plata	Jorge Luis Hirschi	30,000
Gimnasia y Esgrima (LP)	La Plata	Juan Carmelo Zerillo	24,544
Godoy Cruz	Godoy Cruz	Feliciano Gambarte	14,000
Godoy Cruz	Godoy Cruz	Malvinas Argentinas	42,000
Huracán	Buenos Aires	Tomás Adolfo Ducó	48,314
Independiente	Avellaneda	Libertadores de América	52,853
Independiente Rivadavia	Mendoza	Bautista Gargantini	24,000
Instituto	Córdoba	Juan Domingo Perón	26,535
Lanús	Lanús	Ciudad de Lanús - Néstor Díaz Pérez	46,619
Newell's Old Boys	Rosario	Marcelo Bielsa	38,095
Platense	Florida Este	Ciudad de Vicente López	28,530
Racing	Avellaneda	El Cilindro	55,880
River Plate	Buenos Aires	Mâs Monumental	83,196
Rosario Central	Rosario	Gigante de Arroyito	41,654
San Lorenzo	Buenos Aires	Pedro Bidegain	39,494
San Martín (SJ)	San Juan	Ingeniero Hilario Sánchez	26,500
Sarmiento (J)	Junín	Eva Perón	19,000
Talleres (C)	Córdoba	Mario Alberto Kempes	57,000
Tigre	Victoria	José Dellagiovanna	26,282
Unión	Santa Fe	15 de Abril	22,852
Vélez Sarsfield	Buenos Aires	José Amalfitani	45,540

=== Personnel and sponsoring ===
Club	Manager	Kit manufacturer	Shirt sponsors (front)	Other sponsors
Aldosivi	(Argentina) Guillermo Farré	Kappa	Rapicuotas	List: Front: None; Back: Plusmar, Guedikian Impresores, Grupo Moscuzza; Sleeves: SPI Astilleros; Shorts: None; Socks: None; Number: None
Argentinos Juniors	(Argentina) Nicolás Diez	Umbro	Rapicuotas	List: Front: BichoStore Tienda Online; Back: Angiocor, Lindo Campo, Vitta; Sleeves: Gráfica Led, DataCloud; Shorts: Angiocor, Pinturerías Megapint; Socks: None; Number: None
Atlético Tucumán	(Argentina) Hugo Colace (caretaker)	Kappa	Caja Popular de Ahorros	List: Front: Sporting; Back: Construyo al Costo, Flecha Bus; Sleeves: Casino Parque; Shorts: Sporting, Seguridad OMEGA; Socks: None; Number: None
Banfield	(Argentina) Pedro Troglio	Macron	Sur Finanzas	List: Front: None; Back: Multiled; Sleeves: Lomas de Zamora Partido, Sur Finanzas; Shorts: None; Socks: None; Number: None
Barracas Central	(Argentina) Rubén Darío Insúa	Il Ossso Sports	Sur Finanzas	List: Front: None; Back: Turbodisel; Sleeves: Passline, Gentech Suplementos Deportivos; Shorts: Horcrisa, Fusion Tex Revestimientos, Secco; Socks: None; Number: None
Belgrano	(Argentina) Ricardo Zielinski	Umbro	Banco Macro	List: Front: Sanos Salud; Back: Pauny, Playcet; Sleeves: None; Shorts: None; Socks: None; Number: Rio Uruguay Seguros
Boca Juniors	(Argentina) Claudio Úbeda (caretaker)	Adidas	Betsson	List: Front: None; Back: DirecTV; Sleeves: Cetrogar; Shorts: Pax Assistance; Socks: None; Number: None
Central Córdoba (SdE)	(Argentina) Omar De Felippe	Adhoc	Banco Santiago del Estero	List: Front: Santiago del Estero, Santiago del Estero Ciudad, Industria Santiago Metalúrgica, Mc Center Deportes; Back: Tarjeta Sol; Sleeves: None; Shorts: None; Socks: None; Number: None
Defensa y Justicia	(Argentina) Mariano Soso	KDY	Rapicuotas	List: Front: Tiper; Back: Viviendas Roca, Volkswagen Autotag; Sleeves: Pago 24; Shorts: None; Socks: None; Number: Rio Uruguay Seguros
Deportivo Riestra	(Argentina) Gustavo Benítez	Adidas	Speed Unlimited	List: Front: None; Back: Speed Unlimited; Sleeves: None; Shorts: Speed Unlimited; Socks: None; Number: None
Estudiantes (LP)	(Argentina) Eduardo Domínguez	RUGE	Saint-Gobain	List: Front: None; Back: Mateu Sports, Mejor Crédito; Sleeves: Bricks M2V; Shorts: None; Socks: None; Number: None
Gimnasia y Esgrima (LP)	(Argentina) Fernando Zaniratto (caretaker)	Givova	Rapicuotas	List: Front: Enova; Back: Construyo al Costo, Plusmar; Sleeves: Casablanca Pinturas; Shorts: Tamburini Amoblamientos; Socks: None; Number: Rio Uruguay Seguros
Godoy Cruz	(Argentina) Omar Asad	Fiume Sport	CATA Internacional	List: Front: None; Back: Mendoza, Banco Supervielle; Sleeves: Godoy Cruz, Ciudadano News; Shorts: Pinturas Wall, Zummy, Molico; Socks: None; Number: None
Huracán	(Argentina) Frank Kudelka	Kappa	Jeluz	List: Front: None; Back: Casablanca Pinturas, Leiva Joyas; Sleeves: Flecha Bus; Shorts: Laboratorio IMAT, Grupo A; Socks: None; Number: Rio Uruguay Seguros
Independiente	(Bolivia) Gustavo Quinteros	Puma	Sportsbet	List: Front: Rapicuotas; Back: Kanji, Pardo Hogar; Sleeves: Scienza Argentina; Shorts: BiBank; Socks: None; Number: Multiled, Rio Uruguay Seguros
Independiente Rivadavia	(Argentina) Alfredo Berti	Sport Lyon	Banco Macro	List: Front: None; Back: Edelcos; Sleeves: Diario UNO Mendoza; Shorts: ChangoMâs; Socks: None; Number: None
Instituto	(Argentina) Daniel Oldrá	Givova	Banco Macro	List: Front: Befol; Back: GS BIO, Tecnored Latam; Sleeves: GS BIO, Nueva Chevallier; Shorts: GEA Cobertura de Salud; Socks: None; Number: None
Lanús	(Argentina) Mauricio Pellegrino	Umbro	Mapei	List: Front: None; Back: None; Sleeves: Befol; Shorts: Nueva Chevallier, Pinturas Andina; Socks: None; Number: None
Newell's Old Boys	(Argentina) Lucas Bernardi (caretaker)	AIFIT	City Center Online	List: Front: Lotería de Santa Fe, Sedilé; Back: Hospital Italiano Rosario, DR Química, Multiled; Sleeves: Voss 2000; Shorts: Italmédica; Socks: None; Number: Rio Uruguay Seguros
Platense	(Argentina) Hernán Lamberti and (Argentina) Guillermo Báez (caretakers)	Hummel	Planes ESCO	List: Front: Transfarmaco, Empanadas Morita; Back: Civile Propiedades, Cilbrake Autopartes; Sleeves: Toshify; Shorts: Pinturas Andina, Emergencias Salud, Papelera Mas Pack; Socks: None; Number: None
Racing	(Argentina) Gustavo Costas	Kappa	Betsson	List: Front: None; Back: Cetrogar, Sur Finanzas; Sleeves: Rio Uruguay Seguros; Shorts: None; Socks: None; Number: EA Sports FC
River Plate	(Argentina) Marcelo Gallardo	Adidas	Betano	List: Front: None; Back: DirecTV; Sleeves: Assist Card; Shorts: None; Socks: None; Number: None
Rosario Central	(Argentina) Ariel Holan	Le Coq Sportif	City Center Online	List: Front: Lotería de Santa Fe, Techaarg; Back: Kanji; Sleeves: Voss 2000; Shorts: None; Socks: None; Number: Rio Uruguay Seguros
San Lorenzo	(Argentina) Damián Ayude	Atomik	IEB Más	List: Front: None; Back: Intermac Assistance, Flecha Bus; Sleeves: None; Shorts: Kanji; Socks: None; Number: None
San Martín (SJ)	(Argentina) Leandro Romagnoli	Mitre	Gobierno de San Juan	List: Front: None; Back: Banco San Juan, Pinturas Venier; Sleeves: Del Bono Hotels, Integral Distribuciones; Shorts: Crédito Millón, Piazza; Socks: None; Number: None
Sarmiento (J)	(Argentina) Facundo Sava	Coach	Naldo Digital	List: Front: Clínica La Pequeña Familia, FMC Argentina; Back: Laboratorio Quimeco, Alra sur Volkswagen, Aceros Perkusic; Sleeves: Sigma Agro; Shorts: Voy con Energía, Dinatech, Sistemas Junín, FD Agro, Nuseed, AGseed, Stoller; Socks: None; Number: None
Talleres (C)	(Argentina) Carlos Tevez	Le Coq Sportif	Holcim	List: Front: Advanta; Back: Riing; Sleeves: Terrawind; Shorts: MSC Cruceros; Socks: None; Number: None
Tigre	(Argentina) Diego Dabove	Kappa	Banco Macro	List: Front: None; Back: Banco Macro; Sleeves: Yomel Argentina; Shorts: Pinturas Andina; Socks: None; Number: None
Unión	(Argentina) Leonardo Madelón	Givova	OSPAT	List: Front: Vidalac, Transporte Pedrito, Multiled; Back: Flecha Bus, Gigared; Sleeves: Servicios Viales, Sin Culpa; Shorts: Flecha Bus, Sanatorio Santa Fe, Duracril, El Litoral; Socks: Vidalac; Number: None
Vélez Sarsfield	(Argentina) Guillermo Barros Schelotto	Macron	Saphirus	List: Front: None; Back: Banco Supervielle; Sleeves: Yerba Salam; Shorts: Turbodisel; Socks: None; Number: Rio Uruguay Seguros

=== Managerial changes ===
Team	Outgoing manager	Manner of departure	Date of vacancy	Position in table	Replaced by	Date of appointment
Lanús	(Argentina) Ricardo Zielinski	End of contract	13 December 2024	Pre-season	(Argentina) Mauricio Pellegrino	14 December 2024
Argentinos Juniors	(Argentina) Norberto Batista	End of caretaker spell	13 December 2024	Pre-season	(Argentina) Nicolás Diez	17 December 2024
Banfield	(Uruguay) Robinson Hernández	End of caretaker spell	13 December 2024	Pre-season	(Argentina) Ariel Broggi	14 December 2024
Instituto	(Argentina) Daniel Jiménez and (Argentina) Bruno Martelotto	End of caretaker spell	14 December 2024	Pre-season	(Argentina) Pedro Troglio	26 December 2024
Belgrano	(Argentina) Norberto Fernández	End of caretaker spell	14 December 2024	Pre-season	(Argentina) Walter Erviti	20 December 2024
Vélez Sarsfield	(Bolivia) Gustavo Quinteros	End of contract	25 December 2024	Pre-season	(Argentina) Sebastián Domínguez	6 January 2025
Tigre	(Argentina) Sebastián Domínguez	Signed by Vélez Sarsfield	2 January 2025	Pre-season	(Argentina) Diego Dabove	2 January 2025
Torneo Apertura changes
Gimnasia y Esgrima (LP)	(Uruguay) Marcelo Méndez	Resigned	30 January 2025	15th Zone B	(Argentina) Diego Flores ^{1}	10 February 2025
Belgrano	(Argentina) Walter Erviti	Sacked	8 February 2025	13th Zone A	(Argentina) Ricardo Zielinski ^{2}	12 February 2025
Atlético Tucumán	(Argentina) Facundo Sava	Resigned	8 February 2025	10th Zone B	(Argentina) Lucas Pusineri	9 February 2025
Godoy Cruz	(Argentina) Ernesto Pedernera	Demoted to reserve team manager	17 February 2025	11th Zone B	(Argentina) Esteban Solari	18 February 2025
Newell's Old Boys	(Argentina) Mariano Soso	Sacked	17 February 2025	13th Zone A	(Argentina) Cristian Fabbiani	19 February 2025
Deportivo Riestra	(Argentina) Cristian Fabbiani	Signed by Newell's Old Boys	17 February 2025	5th Zone B	(Argentina) Gustavo Benítez	18 February 2025
Vélez Sarsfield	(Argentina) Sebastián Domínguez	Resigned	2 March 2025	15th Zone B	(Argentina) Guillermo Barros Schelotto ^{3}	18 March 2025
Aldosivi	(Argentina) Andrés Yllana	Resigned	10 March 2025	15th Zone A	(Argentina) Mariano Charlier ^{4}	11 March 2025
San Martín (SJ)	(Argentina) Raúl Antuña	Resigned	17 March 2025	15th Zone B	(Argentina) Leandro Romagnoli	18 March 2025
Talleres (C)	(Uruguay) Alexander Medina	Mutual agreement	3 April 2025	10th Zone B	(Argentina) Pablo Guiñazú ^{5}	3 April 2025
Instituto	(Argentina) Pedro Troglio	Mutual agreement	8 April 2025	11th Zone B	(Argentina) Daniel Oldrá ^{6}	16 April 2025
Unión	(Argentina) Kily González	Mutual agreement	14 April 2025	13th Zone A	(Argentina) Leonardo Madelón ^{7}	27 April 2025
Banfield	(Argentina) Ariel Broggi	Resigned	26 April 2025	15th Zone A	(Argentina) Pedro Troglio	28 April 2025
Boca Juniors	(Argentina) Fernando Gago	Sacked	29 April 2025	1st Zone A	(Argentina) Mariano Herrón ^{5}	29 April 2025
Inter-tournament changes
Defensa y Justicia	(Argentina) Pablo De Muner	Mutual agreement	2 May 2025	N/A	(Argentina) Mariano Soso ^{8}	9 June 2025
Talleres (C)	(Argentina) Pablo Guiñazú	End of caretaker spell	3 May 2025	N/A	(Argentina) Diego Cocca ^{9}	28 May 2025
Gimnasia y Esgrima (LP)	(Argentina) Diego Flores	Sacked	11 May 2025	N/A	(Uruguay) Alejandro Orfila	28 May 2025
Boca Juniors	(Argentina) Mariano Herrón	End of caretaker spell	20 May 2025	N/A	(Argentina) Miguel Ángel Russo	30 May 2025
San Lorenzo	(Argentina) Miguel Ángel Russo	Signed by Boca Juniors	26 May 2025	N/A	(Argentina) Damián Ayude	4 June 2025
Platense	(Argentina) Favio Orsi and (Argentina) Sergio Gómez	Resigned	11 June 2025	N/A	(Argentina) Kily González	17 June 2025
Talleres (C)	(Argentina) Diego Cocca	Resigned	8 July 2025	N/A	(Argentina) Carlos Tevez	8 July 2025
Torneo Clausura changes
Sarmiento (J)	(Argentina) Javier Sanguinetti	Sacked	27 July 2025	13th Zone B	(Argentina) Facundo Sava	1 August 2025
Godoy Cruz	(Argentina) Esteban Solari	Mutual agreement	8 August 2025	12th Zone B	(Argentina) Walter Ribonetto	8 August 2025
Aldosivi	(Argentina) Mariano Charlier	Sacked	2 September 2025	15th Zone A	(Argentina) Guillermo Farré	3 September 2025
Independiente	(Argentina) Julio Vaccari	Resigned	13 September 2025	15th Zone B	(Bolivia) Gustavo Quinteros ^{10}	19 September 2025
Boca Juniors	(Argentina) Miguel Ángel Russo	Deceased	8 October 2025	1st Zone A	(Argentina) Claudio Úbeda ^{11}	9 October 2025
Gimnasia y Esgrima (LP)	(Uruguay) Alejandro Orfila	Sacked	13 October 2025	12th Zone B	(Argentina) Fernando Zaniratto ^{12}	14 October 2025
Newell's Old Boys	(Argentina) Cristian Fabbiani	Sacked	18 October 2025	14th Zone A	(Argentina) Lucas Bernardi ^{11}	22 October 2025
Godoy Cruz	(Argentina) Walter Ribonetto	Sacked	20 October 2025	14th Zone B	(Argentina) Omar Asad	21 October 2025
Atlético Tucumán	(Argentina) Lucas Pusineri	Sacked	26 October 2025	8th Zone B	(Argentina) Hugo Colace ^{12}	27 October 2025
Platense	(Argentina) Kily González	Mutual agreement	27 October 2025	13th Zone B	(Argentina) Hernán Lamberti and (Argentina) Guillermo Báez ^{11}	27 October 2025

Interim managers

1. Fernando Zaniratto was interim manager in the Torneo Apertura 3rd–4th rounds and the 2025 Copa Argentina round of 64.
2. (Argentina) Norberto Fernández and (Argentina) Julio Constantín were interim managers in the Torneo Apertura 5th round.
3. (Argentina) Marcelo Bravo was interim manager in the Torneo Apertura 9th–10th rounds.
4. Interim manager, but later promoted to manager.
5. Interim manager until the end of the Torneo Apertura.
6. (Argentina) Daniel Jiménez and (Argentina) Bruno Martelotto were interim managers in the Torneo Apertura 13th–14th rounds.
7. (Argentina) Nicolás Vazzoler was interim manager in the Torneo Apertura 14th–15th rounds and the 2025 Copa Sudamericana Group E 3rd round.
8. Tobías Kohan and Alejandro Kohan were interim managers in the 2025 Copa Sudamericana Group B 4th–6th rounds and the 2025 Copa Argentina round of 32.
9. (Argentina) Mariano Levisman was interim manager in the 2025 Copa Libertadores Group D 4th–6th rounds.
10. (Argentina) Carlos Matheu was interim manager in the Torneo Clausura 9th round.
11. Interim manager until the end of the Torneo Clausura.
12. Interim managers until the end of the Torneo Clausura. Zaniratto and Colace were promoted to managers after the end of the tournament.

=== Foreign players ===
- Players marked in **bold** joined the club during the inter-tournament period and only played with the respective team in the Torneo Clausura.
- Players who participated in the Torneo Apertura but left the team during the inter-tournament period are listed in the last column.

Club	Player 1	Player 2	Player 3	Player 4	Player 5	Player 6	Torneo Apertura
Aldosivi	(Uruguay) **Federico Gino**	(Ecuador) Ayrton Preciado	(Uruguay) **Emiliano Rodríguez**	(Paraguay) Fernando Román	(Colombia) **Alejandro Villarreal**		
Argentinos Juniors	(Uruguay) Mateo Antoni	(Uruguay) Rubén Bentancourt	(Uruguay) Leandro Lozano				List: (Uruguay) Joaquín Ardaiz; (Paraguay) Ariel Gamarra (dn); (Uruguay) Alan Rodríguez
Atlético Tucumán	(Paraguay) **Clever Ferreira**	(Uruguay) Juan González	(Uruguay) Franco Nicola	(Uruguay) **Maximiliano Villa**			List: (Uruguay) Matías de los Santos
Banfield	(Uruguay) Agustín Alaniz	(Colombia) **Danilo Arboleda**	(Colombia) **Frank Castañeda**	(Uruguay) **Mauro Méndez**	(Peru) Diego Romero		List: (Uruguay) Mathías De Ritis; (Ecuador) Damián Díaz (dn); (Paraguay) Paul Riveros
Barracas Central	(Uruguay) Jhonatan Candia	(Uruguay) Yonatthan Rak					
Belgrano	(Uruguay) **Thiago Cardozo**	(Peru) Bryan Reyna	(Uruguay) **Federico Ricca**	(Uruguay) **Rodrigo Saravia**			List: (Paraguay) Juan Espínola
Boca Juniors	(Chile) Williams Alarcón	(Uruguay) Edinson Cavani	(Spain) Ander Herrera	(Chile) Carlos Palacios			List: (Uruguay) Marcelo Saracchi
Central Córdoba (SdE)	(Uruguay) Sebastián Cristóforo	(Paraguay) José Florentín					List: (Colombia) Luis Angulo; (Uruguay) Nicolás Quagliata
Defensa y Justicia	(Uruguay) Lucas Ferreira	(Uruguay) **Juan Manuel Gutiérrez**	(Chile) César Pérez				List: (Colombia) Kevin Balanta
Deportivo Riestra	(Colombia) Yeison Murillo						
Estudiantes (LP)	(Colombia) Edwuin Cetré	(Uruguay) Gabriel Neves					List: (Uruguay) Sebastián Boselli; (Colombia) Alexis Manyoma; (Uruguay) Mauro Méndez
Gimnasia y Esgrima (LP)	(Venezuela) Jan Carlos Hurtado	(Uruguay) Enzo Martínez	(Colombia) **Juan José Pérez**	(Colombia) Alejandro Piedrahita	(Uruguay) Juan Pintado		List: (Uruguay) Martín Fernández; (Venezuela) Júnior Moreno
Godoy Cruz	(Paraguay) **Juan Escobar**	(Uruguay) Nicolás Fernández	(Uruguay) Vicente Poggi	(Chile) Bastián Yáñez			List: (Paraguay) Kevin Parzajuk; (Colombia) Juan José Pérez
Huracán	(Uruguay) **Facundo Waller**						List: (Colombia) Víctor Cantillo
Independiente	(Uruguay) **Matías Abaldo**	(Paraguay) Gabriel Ávalos	(Uruguay) Rodrigo Fernández	(Chile) Pablo Galdames	(Chile) Felipe Loyola		List: (Colombia) Álvaro Angulo; (Italy) Lucas Román (dn)
Independiente Rivadavia	(Paraguay) **Álex Arce**	(Uruguay) Leonard Costa	(Colombia) **Santiago Muñoz**	(Colombia) Sebastián Villa	(Paraguay) Iván Villalba		List: (Uruguay) Maximiliano Juambeltz; (Paraguay) Fernando Romero
Instituto	(Uruguay) Emanuel Beltrán	(Colombia) **Jhon Córdoba**	(Uruguay) **Matias Fonseca**	(Paraguay) Juan José Franco	(Paraguay) **Manuel Romero**		
Lanús	(Paraguay) **José Canale**	(Paraguay) Ronaldo Dejesús	(Colombia) Raúl Loaiza	(Uruguay) Gonzalo Pérez			
Newell's Old Boys	(Paraguay) **Josué Colmán**	(Paraguay) **Juan Espínola**	(Uruguay) **Martín Fernández**	(Paraguay) Carlos González	(Colombia) **Jherson Mosquera**	(Paraguay) Saúl Salcedo	List: (Paraguay) Fernando Cardozo; (Costa Rica) Keylor Navas
Platense	(Uruguay) Edgar Elizalde	(Peru) Juan Pablo Goicochea	(Paraguay) Ronaldo Martínez	(Chile) Maximiliano Rodríguez			List: (Syria) Tobías Cervera (dn)
Racing	(Uruguay) Adrián Balboa	(Uruguay) Martín Barrios	(Uruguay) Gastón Martirena	(Paraguay) Richard Sánchez	(Colombia) **Duván Vergara**		
River Plate	(Colombia) Miguel Borja	(Uruguay) **Sebastián Boselli**	(Colombia) Kevin Castaño	(Colombia) **Juan Fernando Quintero**			List: (Paraguay) Matías Rojas; (Chile) Gonzalo Tapia
Rosario Central	(Colombia) Jaminton Campaz	(Paraguay) Enzo Giménez	(Uruguay) Facundo Mallo				List: (Paraguay) Sebastián Ferreira
San Lorenzo	(Paraguay) Orlando Gill	(Colombia) **Diego Herazo**	(Colombia) Jhohan Romaña				List: (Spain) Iker Muniain; (Colombia) Jaime Peralta
San Martín (SJ)	(Uruguay) **Pablo García**						List: (Venezuela) Edwuin Pernía
Sarmiento (J)	(Uruguay) **Joaquín Ardaiz**	(Chile) Iván Morales	(Uruguay) Renzo Orihuela	(Colombia) Jhon Rentería	(Uruguay) Leandro Suhr		
Talleres (C)	(Colombia) **Luis Angulo**	(Venezuela) Miguel Navarro	(Colombia) Juan Portilla	(Brazil) Rick	(Brazil) **Rodrigo Guth**		List: (Paraguay) Matías Galarza (dn); (Paraguay) Blas Riveros
Tigre	(Uruguay) Ramón Arias	(Paraguay) Blas Armoa	(Paraguay) Alfio Oviedo	(Chile) **Guillermo Soto**			List: (Paraguay) Romeo Benítez; (Uruguay) Ignacio Neira; (Venezuela) Eric Ramírez
Unión	(Uruguay) **Emiliano Álvarez**	(Paraguay) **Fernando Díaz**	(Uruguay) **Maizon Rodríguez**				List: (Ecuador) José Enrique Angulo; (Uruguay) Thiago Cardozo; (Syria) Ezequiel Ham (dn)
Vélez Sarsfield	(Chile) Claudio Baeza	(Colombia) **Álvaro Montero**	(Uruguay) Michael Santos	(Chile) **Diego Valdés**			List: (Uruguay) Randall Rodríguez

==== Players holding Argentinian dual nationality ====
They did not take up a foreign slot.

- (Syria) **Tobías Cervera** (Aldosivi)
- (Paraguay) Juan José Cardozo (Argentinos Juniors)
- (Italy) **Lucas Román** (Atlético Tucumán)
- (Syria) Ignacio Abraham (Banfield)
- (Armenia) Tomás Adoryán (Banfield) ^{a}
- (Syria) Facundo Mater (Barracas Central)
- (Armenia) Lucas Zelarayán (Belgrano)
- (Peru) Luis Advíncula (Boca Juniors)
- (Switzerland) Lucas Blondel (Boca Juniors)
- (Colombia) Frank Fabra (Boca Juniors)
- (Uruguay) Miguel Merentiel (Boca Juniors) ^{b}
- (Brazil) **Lenny Lobato** (Defensa y Justicia)
- (Uruguay) Antony Alonso (Deportivo Riestra)
- (Uruguay) Franco Fagúndez (Deportivo Riestra)
- (Paraguay) Santiago Arzamendia (Estudiantes (LP))
- (Uruguay) **Fernando Muslera** (Estudiantes (LP))
- (Uruguay) Tiago Palacios (Estudiantes (LP))
- (Armenia) Norberto Briasco (Gimnasia y Esgrima (LP))
- (Mexico) Luca Martínez (Godoy Cruz)
- (Ecuador) Hernán Galíndez (Huracán)
- (Chile) Leonardo Gil (Huracán)
- (United States) Matko Miljevic (Huracán)
- (Chile) Luciano Cabral (Independiente)
- (Chile) Lautaro Millán (Independiente) ^{a}
- (Ecuador) Matías Klimowicz (Instituto)
- (Uruguay) Armando Méndez (Lanús)
- (Mexico) Thiago Gigena (Newell's Old Boys)
- (Venezuela) Andrew Pereira (Newell's Old Boys)
- (Chile) Gabriel Arias (Racing)
- (Brazil) Giorgio Costantini (River Plate)
- (Chile) Paulo Díaz (River Plate)
- (Paraguay) **Matías Galarza** (River Plate)
- (Italy) Agustín Módica (Rosario Central)
- (Paraguay) Agustín Sández (Rosario Central)
- (Slovenia) Andrés Vombergar (San Lorenzo)
- (Ecuador) Javier Burrai (Talleres (C))
- (Chile) Matías Catalán (Talleres (C))
- (Chile) Ulises Ortegoza (Talleres (C))
- (Syria) **Jalil Elías** (Tigre)
- (Malaysia) Imanol Machuca (Vélez Sarsfield) ^{c}

Source: AFA

a. Adoryán played his first international match during the inter-tournament period. Millán played his in September.
b. During the Torneo Apertura, Merentiel was listed as a foreign player. He obtained Argentine citizenship between the Torneo Apertura and Torneo Clausura.
c. Machuca played his first international match during the inter-tournament period. After investigating the Football Association of Malaysia for document falsification, FIFA announced, on 26 September 2025, that Machuca would be suspended from professional football for one year.

== Draw ==
The draw for the group stages was held on 20 December 2024, 14:30, at the AFA Futsal Stadium in Ezeiza. The 30 teams were drawn into two groups of fifteen containing one team from each of the interzonal matches.

Interzonal matches
Team 1	Team 2
Boca Juniors; Independiente; Huracán; Newell's Old Boys; Estudiantes (LP); Instituto; Banfield; Belgrano; Argentinos Juniors; Tigre; Godoy Cruz; Atlético Tucumán; Defensa y Justicia; Barracas Central; Aldosivi	River Plate; Racing; San Lorenzo; Rosario Central; Gimnasia y Esgrima (LP); Unión; Lanús; Talleres (C); Platense; Vélez Sarsfield; Independiente Rivadavia; Central Córdoba (SdE); Deportivo Riestra; Sarmiento (J); San Martín (SJ)

== Torneo Apertura ==
The 2025 Torneo Apertura (officially the Torneo Betano Apertura 2025 for sponsorship reasons) was the first tournament of the 2025 season. It began on 23 January and ended on 1 June 2025.

=== Group stage ===
In the group stage, each group was played on a single round-robin basis. In addition, each team played two inter-zone matches: the first against its rival from the other zone, and the second, in the eighth round, against a second team determined by a draw. Teams were ranked according to the following criteria: 1. Points (3 points for a win, 1 point for a draw, and 0 points for a loss); 2. Goal difference; 3. Goals scored; 4. Head-to-head results; 5. Fair play ranking; 6. Draw.

The top eight teams of each group advanced to the round of 16.

==== Standings ====
===== Zone A =====
Pos	Team	Pld	W	D	L	GF	GA	GD	Pts	Qualification
1	Argentinos Juniors	16	9	6	1	24	9	+15	33	Advance to round of 16
2	Boca Juniors	16	10	3	3	24	11	+13	33	Advance to round of 16
3	Racing	16	9	1	6	26	16	+10	28	Advance to round of 16
4	Huracán	16	7	6	3	19	12	+7	27	Advance to round of 16
5	Tigre	16	8	3	5	18	12	+6	27	Advance to round of 16
6	Independiente Rivadavia	16	7	6	3	20	17	+3	27	Advance to round of 16
7	Barracas Central	16	7	5	4	20	18	+2	26	Advance to round of 16
8	Estudiantes (LP)	16	5	6	5	18	19	−1	21	Advance to round of 16
9	Newell's Old Boys	16	5	4	7	12	15	−3	19	
10	Defensa y Justicia	16	5	4	7	18	22	−4	19	
11	Central Córdoba (SdE)	16	5	3	8	21	22	−1	18	
12	Belgrano	16	3	8	5	13	23	−10	17	
13	Aldosivi	16	4	3	9	18	28	−10	15	
14	Banfield	16	3	5	8	14	19	−5	14	
15	Unión	16	3	5	8	11	17	−6	14	

Source: AFA

===== Zone B =====
Pos	Team	Pld	W	D	L	GF	GA	GD	Pts	Qualification
1	Rosario Central	16	10	5	1	22	8	+14	35	Advance to round of 16
2	River Plate	16	8	7	1	21	9	+12	31	Advance to round of 16
3	Independiente	16	8	5	3	23	12	+11	29	Advance to round of 16
4	San Lorenzo	16	7	6	3	14	10	+4	27	Advance to round of 16
5	Deportivo Riestra	16	5	9	2	13	7	+6	24	Advance to round of 16
6	Platense	16	6	5	5	13	11	+2	23	Advance to round of 16
7	Lanús	16	4	8	4	13	11	+2	20	Advance to round of 16
8	Instituto	16	5	3	8	16	20	−4	18	Advance to round of 16
9	Godoy Cruz	16	3	8	5	8	18	−10	17	
10	Atlético Tucumán	16	5	1	10	17	21	−4	16	
11	Gimnasia y Esgrima (LP)	16	4	4	8	9	18	−9	16	
12	Sarmiento (J)	16	2	9	5	11	19	−8	15	
13	Vélez Sarsfield	16	4	2	10	7	22	−15	14	
14	Talleres (C)	16	2	7	7	11	15	−4	13	
15	San Martín (SJ)	16	2	3	11	5	18	−13	9	

Source: AFA

==== Results ====
In the group stage, teams played every other team in their group once (either home or away), plus two interzonal games, for a total of 16 rounds.

===== Zone A =====
Home \ Away	ALD	ARG	BAN	BAR	BEL	BOC	CCO	DYJ	EST	HUR	IRI	NOB	RAC	TIG	UNI
Aldosivi			2–1	1–3				0–5	2–2				0–2	0–2	2–1
Argentinos Juniors	0–2			3–0				4–1	4–0	1–1	0–0			1–0	
Banfield		1–2			1–1	0–1	3–1			0–0	1–1	3–0			
Barracas Central			1–0				3–3		2–1			2–0	1–3	1–0	2–1
Belgrano	2–0	1–1		1–1		1–3		2–0		1–1	0–3				
Boca Juniors	2–1	0–0		1–0				4–0	2–0	2–1	2–0				
Central Córdoba (SdE)	1–0	1–1			4–0	0–3				1–2	1–2	2–0			
Defensa y Justicia			0–1	1–1			2–1		1–0				1–2	1–2	0–0
Estudiantes (LP)			1–0		0–1		3–2					1–1	2–0	0–0	3–1
Huracán	3–3			0–1				1–1	0–0		2–0			2–0	1–0
Independiente Rivadavia	1–0			0–0				3–2	2–2				2–1	1–4	2–0
Newell's Old Boys	1–0	0–0			0–0	2–0		0–1		2–0	0–1				
Racing		2–3	4–1		4–0	2–0	1–0			0–1		1–0			
Tigre			1–0		0–0	1–1	1–2					0–2	1–0		1–0
Unión		0–1	3–1		1–1	1–1	1–0					1–1	0–1		

Source: AFA
Legend: Blue = home team win; Yellow = draw; Red = away team win.

===== Zone B =====
Home \ Away	ATU	DRI	GLP	GOD	IND	INS	LAN	PLA	RIV	ROS	SLO	SMA	SAR	TAL	VEL
Atlético Tucumán		0–3	0–1		2–0	3–2	1–0						5–0		1–2
Deportivo Riestra				3–0				1–0	0–0	0–0	0–0	0–0		0–0	
Gimnasia y Esgrima (LP)		1–1		3–0				1–0	0–3		0–2	1–0	0–0		
Godoy Cruz	1–0						0–0	1–1	0–0	0–3	0–0			0–0	
Independiente		0–0	2–0	4–0		2–0						2–0	2–1		3–0
Instituto		3–0	3–0	1–1							0–1	1–0	1–1		2–0
Lanús		0–2	0–0		1–1	4–1						1–0	2–0		0–0
Platense	2–1				1–1	1–0	0–0		1–1	0–0				2–1	
River Plate	1–0				2–0	1–0	1–0			2–2				1–1	4–1
Rosario Central	3–1		2–1		1–0	3–0	2–1						1–0		2–1
San Lorenzo	1–0				1–2		1–1	2–1	0–0	0–1				1–0	
San Martín (SJ)	0–1			1–0				0–2	0–2	0–0	0–1			0–1	
Sarmiento (J)		2–1		0–0				0–1	1–1		1–1	1–1		0–0	
Talleres (C)	1–1		2–0		2–3	1–2	0–1			0–0					0–1
Vélez Sarsfield		0–1	1–0	0–2				0–1			0–0	1–0	0–1		

Source: AFA
Legend: Blue = home team win; Yellow = draw; Red = away team win.

===== Interzonal matches =====
Home	Score	Away
Tigre	3–0	Vélez Sarsfield
Central Córdoba (SdE)	2–0	Atlético Tucumán
Argentinos Juniors	1–0	Platense
Deportivo Riestra	1–1	Defensa y Justicia
Unión	0–0	Instituto
Newell's Old Boys	1–2	Rosario Central
Huracán	2–0	San Lorenzo
Sarmiento (J)	1–1	Barracas Central
Independiente	1–1	Racing
Belgrano	1–1	Talleres (C)
Godoy Cruz	1–1	Independiente Rivadavia
Gimnasia y Esgrima (LP)	1–1	Estudiantes (LP)
Lanús	1–1	Banfield
River Plate	2–1	Boca Juniors
San Martín (SJ)	0–3	Aldosivi

Home	Score	Away
Boca Juniors	1–0	Rosario Central
Central Córdoba (SdE)	0–0	Deportivo Riestra
San Martín (SJ)	3–1	Belgrano
Aldosivi	2–2	Sarmiento (J)
River Plate	0–2	Estudiantes (LP)
Talleres (C)	1–2	Tigre
Unión	1–0	Gimnasia y Esgrima (LP)
Argentinos Juniors	2–0	Instituto
Independiente Rivadavia	1–1	Lanús
Vélez Sarsfield	0–2	Huracán
Barracas Central	1–2	Godoy Cruz
San Lorenzo	3–2	Racing
Atlético Tucumán	1–2	Newell's Old Boys
Banfield	0–0	Independiente
Platense	0–1	Defensa y Justicia

Source: AFA
Legend: Blue = home team win; Yellow = draw; Red = away team win.

=== Final stages ===
Starting from the round of 16, the teams played a single-elimination tournament on a single-leg basis with the following rules:

- In the round of 16, the quarter-finals, and the semi-finals, the higher-seeded team was the host.
  - If tied, a penalty shoot-out would be used to determine the winners.
- The Final was played at a neutral venue.
  - If tied, extra time would be played. If the score is still tied after extra time, a penalty shoot-out would be used to determine the champions.

==== Bracket ====
Round of 16
Boca Juniors (p)	0 (4)
Lanús	0 (2)
Independiente	1
Independiente Rivadavia	0
Rosario Central	2
Estudiantes (LP)	0
Huracán	3
Deportivo Riestra	2
Argentinos Juniors	3
Instituto	1
San Lorenzo	2
Tigre	1
River Plate	3
Barracas Central	0
Racing	0
Platense	1

Quarter-finals
Boca Juniors	0
Independiente	1
Rosario Central	0
Huracán	1
Argentinos Juniors	1 (7)
San Lorenzo (p)	1 (8)
River Plate	1 (2)
Platense (p)	1 (4)

Semi-finals
Independiente	0 (5)
Huracán (p)	0 (6)
San Lorenzo	0
Platense	1

Final
Huracán	0
Platense	1

==== Round of 16 ====
10 May 2025	San Lorenzo	2–1	Tigre	Buenos Aires
14:00	Vombergar 3'; Cuello 88'	Report	Fértoli 48'	Stadium: Pedro Bidegain; Referee: Yael Falcón Pérez

10 May 2025	Rosario Central	2–0	Estudiantes (LP)	Rosario
16:30	Quintana 87'; Campaz 90+5'	Report		Stadium: Gigante de Arroyito; Referee: Andrés Merlos

10 May 2025	Racing	0–1	Platense	Avellaneda
18:45		Report	Orsini 83'	Stadium: El Cilindro; Referee: Darío Herrera

10 May 2025	Boca Juniors	0–0 (4–2 p)	Lanús	Buenos Aires
21:00		Report		Stadium: La Bombonera; Referee: Leandro Rey Hilfer
	Penalties
	Rojo (penalty scored); Zeballos (penalty scored); Alarcón (penalty scored); Giménez (penalty scored)		(penalty missed) Canelo; (penalty scored) Moreno; (penalty missed) Aquino; (penalty scored) Carrera

11 May 2025	Independiente	1–0	Independiente Rivadavia	Avellaneda
15:30	Montiel 56'	Report		Stadium: Libertadores de América; Referee: Hernán Mastángelo

11 May 2025	Argentinos Juniors	3–1	Instituto	Buenos Aires
18:00	Molina 60'; Herrera 63'; Sosa 88'	Report	Requena 70'	Stadium: Diego Armando Maradona; Referee: Andrés Gariano

11 May 2025	Huracán	3–2	Deportivo Riestra	Buenos Aires
20:30	Ramírez 45+1', 68'; Sansotre 77' (o.g.)	Report	Alonso 58'; Benegas 81'	Stadium: Tomás Adolfo Ducó; Referee: Fernando Echenique

12 May 2025	River Plate	3–0	Barracas Central	Buenos Aires
20:30	Díaz 11'; Fernández 42'; Acuña 87'	Report		Stadium: Mâs Monumental; Referee: Sebastián Zunino

==== Quarter-finals ====
18 May 2025	Rosario Central	0–1	Huracán	Rosario
19:00		Report	Mazzantti 20'	Stadium: Gigante de Arroyito; Referee: Pablo Echavarría

19 May 2025	Argentinos Juniors	1–1 (7–8 p)	San Lorenzo	Buenos Aires
19:00	Molina 90+5'	Report	Vombergar 69'	Stadium: Diego Armando Maradona; Referee: Facundo Tello
	Penalties
	Lozano (penalty scored); Sosa (penalty scored); Prieto (penalty scored); Ardaiz (penalty scored); D. Rodríguez (penalty scored); Molina (penalty scored); Lescano (penalty scored); Romero (penalty missed)		(penalty scored) Vombergar; (penalty scored) Cuello; (penalty scored) Báez; (penalty scored) Herrera; (penalty scored) Domínguez; (penalty scored) Tripichio; (penalty scored) Reali; (penalty scored) Hernández

19 May 2025	Boca Juniors	0–1	Independiente	Buenos Aires
21:30		Report	Angulo 63'	Stadium: La Bombonera; Referee: Nicolás Ramírez

20 May 2025	River Plate	1–1 (2–4 p)	Platense	Buenos Aires
20:30	Mastantuono 90+12' (pen.)	Report	Taborda 29'	Stadium: Mâs Monumental; Referee: Yael Falcón Pérez
	Penalties
	Mastantuono (penalty scored); Borja (penalty scored); Castaño (penalty missed); Driussi (penalty missed)		(penalty scored) Vázquez; (penalty missed) Saborido; (penalty scored) Mainero; (penalty scored) Zapiola; (penalty scored) Schor

==== Semi-finals ====
24 May 2025	Independiente	0–0 (5–6 p)	Huracán	Avellaneda
18:30		Report		Stadium: Libertadores de América; Referee: Hernán Mastrángelo
	Penalties
	Ávalos (penalty missed); Montiel (penalty scored); Galdames (penalty scored); Loyola (penalty scored); Lomónaco (penalty scored); Angulo (penalty scored); Hidalgo (penalty missed)		(penalty scored) Sequeira; (penalty scored) Guidara; (penalty scored) Pellegrino; (penalty scored) Miljevic; (penalty missed) Gil; (penalty scored) Pereyra; (penalty scored) Mazzantti

25 May 2025	San Lorenzo	0–1	Platense	Buenos Aires
16:00		Report	Zapiola 71'	Stadium: Pedro Bidegain; Referee: Leandro Rey Hilfer

==== Final ====
1 June 2025
17:00

Huracán	0–1	Platense
	Report	Mainero 63'

Estadio Único Madre de Ciudades, Santiago del Estero
Referee: Facundo Tello

=== Statistics ===
==== Top goalscorers ====
Rank	Player	Club	Goals
1	(Argentina) Tomás Molina	Argentinos Juniors	10
2	(Argentina) Adrián Martínez	Racing	9
2	(Slovenia) Andrés Vombergar	San Lorenzo	9
4	(Argentina) Nicolás Fernández	Belgrano	8
4	(Paraguay) Gabriel Ávalos	Independiente	8
6	(Argentina) Elías Torres	Aldosivi	6
6	(Uruguay) Jhonatan Candia	Barracas Central	6
6	(Uruguay) Miguel Merentiel	Boca Juniors	6

Source: AFA

==== Top assists ====
Rank	Player	Club	Assists
1	(Argentina) Ignacio Malcorra	Rosario Central	5
2	(Argentina) Francisco Álvarez	Argentinos Juniors	4
2	(Argentina) Alan Lescano	Argentinos Juniors	4
2	(Argentina) Javier Ruiz	Barracas Central	4
2	(Colombia) Luis Angulo	Central Córdoba (SdE)	4
2	(Colombia) Sebastián Villa	Independiente Rivadavia	4
2	(Argentina) Éver Banega	Newell's Old Boys	4
2	(Argentina) Guido Mainero	Platense	4
2	(Uruguay) Gastón Martirena	Racing	4
2	(Argentina) Franco Mastantuono	River Plate	4
2	(Argentina) Gonzalo Montiel	River Plate	4

Source: AFA

== Torneo Clausura ==
The 2025 Torneo Clausura (officially the Torneo Betano Clausura 2025 for sponsorship reasons) was the second tournament of the 2025 season. It began on 11 July and ended on 13 December 2025.

=== Group stage ===
In the group stage, each group was played on a single round-robin basis. In addition, each team played two inter-zone matches: the first against its rival from the other zone, and the second, in the eighth round, against a second team determined by a draw. Teams were ranked according to the following criteria: 1. Points (3 points for a win, 1 point for a draw, and 0 points for a loss); 2. Goal difference; 3. Goals scored; 4. Head-to-head results; 5. Fair play ranking; 6. Draw.

The top eight teams of each group advanced to the round of 16. Teams in relegation or in the relegation play-offs would not be eligible to play in the final stages.

==== Standings ====
===== Zone A =====
Pos	Team	Pld	W	D	L	GF	GA	GD	Pts	Qualification
1	Boca Juniors	16	8	5	3	28	12	+16	29	Advance to round of 16
2	Unión	16	6	7	3	20	13	+7	25	Advance to round of 16
3	Racing	16	7	4	5	16	13	+3	25	Advance to round of 16
4	Central Córdoba (SdE)	16	5	9	2	17	11	+6	24	Advance to round of 16
5	Argentinos Juniors	16	7	3	6	18	13	+5	24	Advance to round of 16
6	Barracas Central	16	5	8	3	19	17	+2	23	Advance to round of 16
7	Tigre	16	5	7	4	14	13	+1	22	Advance to round of 16
8	Estudiantes (LP)	16	6	3	7	17	18	−1	21	Advance to round of 16
9	Banfield	16	6	3	7	15	21	−6	21	
10	Belgrano	16	4	8	4	13	11	+2	20	
11	Huracán	16	5	5	6	10	15	−5	20	
12	Defensa y Justicia	16	5	4	7	14	19	−5	19	
13	Aldosivi	16	5	3	8	13	18	−5	18	
14	Independiente Rivadavia	16	3	7	6	14	17	−3	16	
15	Newell's Old Boys	16	3	5	8	13	23	−10	14	

Source: AFA

===== Zone B =====
Pos	Team	Pld	W	D	L	GF	GA	GD	Pts	Qualification
1	Rosario Central	16	8	7	1	18	8	+10	31	Advance to round of 16
2	Lanús	16	9	3	4	20	13	+7	30	Advance to round of 16
3	Deportivo Riestra	16	8	4	4	19	12	+7	28	Advance to round of 16
4	Vélez Sarsfield	16	7	5	4	19	12	+7	26	Advance to round of 16
5	San Lorenzo	16	6	6	4	13	11	+2	24	Advance to round of 16
6	River Plate	16	6	4	6	20	15	+5	22	Advance to round of 16
7	Gimnasia y Esgrima (LP)	16	7	1	8	14	16	−2	22	Advance to round of 16
8	Talleres (C)	16	5	6	5	9	12	−3	21	Advance to round of 16
9	Sarmiento (J)	16	5	5	6	13	17	−4	20	
10	San Martín (SJ)	16	4	7	5	13	16	−3	19	
11	Independiente	16	4	6	6	14	13	+1	18	
12	Atlético Tucumán	16	5	3	8	17	22	−5	18	
13	Instituto	16	3	7	6	9	17	−8	16	
14	Godoy Cruz	16	1	9	6	11	19	−8	12	
15	Platense	16	2	6	8	12	25	−13	12	

Source: AFA

==== Results ====
In the group stage, teams played every other team in their group once (either home or away), plus two interzonal games, for a total of 16 rounds.

===== Zone A =====
Home \ Away	ALD	ARG	BAN	BAR	BEL	BOC	CCO	DYJ	EST	HUR	IRI	NOB	RAC	TIG	UNI
Aldosivi		0–2			0–0	0–2	0–0			2–0	3–1	0–0			
Argentinos Juniors			3–0		1–0	0–0	0–0					3–1	4–1		1–0
Banfield	0–1			1–3				0–0	3–2				1–3	1–0	0–0
Barracas Central	3–1	2–0			1–1	1–3		1–1		1–1	0–3				
Belgrano			2–1				0–3		1–1			3–0	0–1	0–0	0–0
Boca Juniors			2–0		1–2		2–2					5–0	1–1	2–0	1–1
Central Córdoba (SdE)			1–1	1–1				2–1	2–0				0–0	0–1	3–1
Defensa y Justicia	2–0	1–0			2–1	2–1				1–3	0–2	1–1			
Estudiantes (LP)	1–0	1–2		1–1		1–2		1–0		2–1	2–1				
Huracán		1–0	1–0		0–3	1–0	0–1					0–2	0–2		
Independiente Rivadavia		2–1	1–2		0–0	0–3	0–0			0–0		1–2			
Newell's Old Boys			1–2	1–2			1–1		1–1				0–1	1–1	0–1
Racing	1–0			0–1				1–0	0–1		0–0			1–2	2–3
Tigre	2–0	2–1		2–2				1–1	1–0	0–1	1–1				
Unión	0–2			0–0				3–0	1–0	1–1	2–2			0–0	

Source: AFA
Legend: Blue = home team win; Yellow = draw; Red = away team win.

===== Zone B =====
Home \ Away	ATU	DRI	GLP	GOD	IND	INS	LAN	PLA	RIV	ROS	SLO	SMA	SAR	TAL	VEL
Atlético Tucumán				2–1				2–0	2–0	0–0	1–2	2–1		3–0	
Deportivo Riestra	1–0		1–0		0–1	1–0	1–0						3–0		2–2
Gimnasia y Esgrima (LP)	1–0				1–0	0–1	1–2			0–3				1–2	2–0
Godoy Cruz		1–1	1–2		1–1	1–1						0–0	0–0		0–2
Independiente	3–0						0–2	3–0	0–0	1–0	1–1			1–2	
Instituto	2–0				0–0		0–0	1–1	0–4	1–3				0–0	
Lanús	3–1			2–0				2–1	1–1	0–1	2–1			1–0	
Platense		1–1	0–3	1–3							2–1	2–2	1–1		0–0
River Plate		1–2	0–1	4–2				3–1			0–0	2–0	0–1		
Rosario Central		1–1		1–1				1–0	2–1		0–0	0–0		1–1	
San Lorenzo		1–0	0–0	2–0		1–0						0–1	1–1		1–0
San Martín (SJ)		3–2	1–0		1–0	0–0	1–1						0–1		1–2
Sarmiento (J)	2–2		0–1		2–2	2–1	0–2			0–1					0–2
Talleres (C)		0–1		0–0				1–0	0–2		1–2	0–0	1–0		
Vélez Sarsfield	3–1				2–1	0–0	3–0		0–0	1–2				0–1	

Source: AFA
Legend: Blue = home team win; Yellow = draw; Red = away team win.

===== Interzonal matches =====
Home	Score	Away
Vélez Sarsfield	2–1	Tigre
Atlético Tucumán	1–1	Central Córdoba (SdE)
Platense	0–0	Argentinos Juniors
Defensa y Justicia	1–0	Deportivo Riestra
Instituto	0–4	Unión
Rosario Central	1–0	Newell's Old Boys
San Lorenzo	0–0	Huracán
Barracas Central	0–1	Sarmiento (J)
Racing	0–0	Independiente
Talleres (C)	0–0	Belgrano
Independiente Rivadavia	0–0	Godoy Cruz
Estudiantes (LP)	2–0	Gimnasia y Esgrima (LP)
Banfield	2–1	Lanús
Boca Juniors	2–0	River Plate
Aldosivi	4–2	San Martín (SJ)

Home	Score	Away
Belgrano	0–0	San Martín (SJ)
Deportivo Riestra	2–0	Central Córdoba (SdE)
Huracán	0–0	Vélez Sarsfield
Racing	2–0	San Lorenzo
Lanús	1–0	Independiente Rivadavia
Newell's Old Boys	2–0	Atlético Tucumán
Godoy Cruz	0–0	Barracas Central
Independiente	0–1	Banfield
Estudiantes (LP)	1–2	River Plate
Sarmiento (J)	2–0	Aldosivi
Gimnasia y Esgrima (LP)	1–3	Unión
Instituto	2–0	Argentinos Juniors
Rosario Central	1–1	Boca Juniors
Defensa y Justicia	1–2	Platense
Tigre	0–0	Talleres (C)

Source: AFA
Legend: Blue = home team win; Yellow = draw; Red = away team win.

=== Final stages ===
Starting from the round of 16, the teams played a single-elimination tournament on a single-leg basis with the following rules:

- In the round of 16, quarter-finals and semi-finals, the higher seed was the host team. However, the final was played at a neutral venue.
  - If tied, extra time would be played. If the score is still tied after extra time, a penalty shoot-out would be used to determine the champions.

==== Bracket ====
Round of 16
Boca Juniors	2
Talleres (C)	0
Vélez Sarsfield	0
Argentinos Juniors	2
Racing	3
River Plate	2
Lanús	0
Tigre	1
Deportivo Riestra	0
Barracas Central (a.e.t.)	1
Unión	1
Gimnasia y Esgrima (LP)	2
Central Córdoba (SdE)	2
San Lorenzo	1
Rosario Central	0
Estudiantes (LP)	1

Quarter-finals
Boca Juniors	1
Argentinos Juniors	0
Racing (p)	0 (4)
Tigre	0 (2)
Barracas Central	0
Gimnasia y Esgrima (LP)	2
Central Córdoba (SdE)	0
Estudiantes (LP)	1

Semi-finals
Boca Juniors	0
Racing	1
Gimnasia y Esgrima (LP)	0
Estudiantes (LP)	1

Final
Racing	1 (4)
Estudiantes (LP) (p)	1 (5)

==== Round of 16 ====
22 November 2025	Vélez Sarsfield	0–2	Argentinos Juniors	Buenos Aires
20:00		Report	López Muñoz 57', 61'	Stadium: José Amalfitani; Referee: Andrés Merlos

22 November 2025	Central Córdoba (SdE)	2–1	San Lorenzo	Santiago del Estero
22:00	Varaldo 66' (pen.); Florentín 90'	Report	Gulli 45'	Stadium: Único Madre de Ciudades; Referee: Nazareno Arasa

23 November 2025	Rosario Central	0–1	Estudiantes (LP)	Rosario
17:30		Report	Cetré 30'	Stadium: Gigante de Arroyito; Referee: Pablo Dóvalo

23 November 2025	Boca Juniors	2–0	Talleres (C)	Buenos Aires
20:00	Merentiel 28', 46'	Report		Stadium: La Bombonera; Referee: Sebastián Zunino

24 November 2025	Deportivo Riestra	0–1 (a.e.t.)	Barracas Central	Buenos Aires
17:00		Report	Blandi 115'	Stadium: Guillermo Laza; Referee: Nicolás Ramírez

24 November 2025	Racing	3–2	River Plate	Avellaneda
19:30	Solari 3'; Martínez Quarta 72' (o.g.); Martirena 90+2'	Report	Subiabre 61'; Quintero 63'	Stadium: El Cilindro; Referee: Facundo Tello

24 November 2025	Unión	1–2	Gimnasia y Esgrima (LP)	Santa Fe
22:00	Tarragona 53'	Report	Panaro 17'; Martínez 23'	Stadium: 15 de Abril; Referee: Sebastián Martínez

26 November 2025	Lanús	0–1	Tigre	Lanús
21:30		Report	Romero 47'	Stadium: Ciudad de Lanús – Néstor Díaz Pérez; Referee: Leandro Rey Hilfer

==== Quarter-finals ====
29 November 2025	Central Córdoba (SdE)	0–1	Estudiantes (LP)	Santiago del Estero
21:30		Report	Palacios 64'	Stadium: Único Madre de Ciudades; Referee: Yael Falcón Pérez

30 November 2025	Boca Juniors	1–0	Argentinos Juniors	Buenos Aires
18:30	Costa 4'	Report		Stadium: La Bombonera; Referee: Fernando Echenique

1 December 2025	Barracas Central	0–2	Gimnasia y Esgrima (LP)	Buenos Aires
17:00		Report	Panaro 21'; F. Torres 90+2'	Stadium: Claudio "Chiqui" Tapia; Referee: Hernán Mastrángelo

1 December 2025	Racing	0–0 (a.e.t.) (4–2 p)	Tigre	Avellaneda
21:30		Report		Stadium: El Cilindro; Referee: Andrés Merlos
	Penalties
	Martínez (penalty scored); Fernández (penalty scored); Rojas (penalty scored); García Basso (penalty scored)		(penalty missed) Cardona; (penalty scored) Sosa; (penalty missed) Laso; (penalty scored) López

==== Semi-finals ====
7 December 2025	Boca Juniors	0–1	Racing	Buenos Aires
19:00		Report	Martínez 74'	Stadium: La Bombonera; Referee: Darío Herrera

8 December 2025	Gimnasia y Esgrima (LP)	0–1	Estudiantes (LP)	La Plata
17:00		Report	Palacios 61'	Stadium: Juan Carmelo Zerillo; Referee: Facundo Tello

==== Final ====
13 December 2025
21:00

Racing	1–1 (a.e.t.)	Estudiantes (LP)
Martínez 80'	Report	Carrillo 90+2'
Penalties
Martínez (penalty scored); Vietto (penalty scored); García Basso (penalty scored); Martirena (penalty missed); Sosa (penalty scored); Pardo (penalty missed)	4–5	(penalty scored) Sosa; (penalty missed) Cetré; (penalty scored) Alario; (penalty scored) Tobio Burgos; (penalty scored) Meza; (penalty scored) Rodríguez

Estadio Único Madre de Ciudades, Santiago del Estero
Referee: Nicolás Ramírez

=== Statistics ===
==== Top goalscorers ====
Rank	Player	Club	Goals
1	(Paraguay) Ronaldo Martínez	Platense	8
2	(Uruguay) Miguel Merentiel	Boca Juniors	7
2	(Argentina) Marcelo Torres	Gimnasia y Esgrima (LP)	7
2	(Argentina) Rodrigo Castillo	Lanús	7
2	(Argentina) Ángel Di María	Rosario Central	7
6	(Argentina) Hernán López Muñoz	Argentinos Juniors	6
6	(Argentina) Jonathan Herrera	Deportivo Riestra	6
8	(Argentina) Facundo Bruera	Barracas Central	5
8	(Argentina) Milton Giménez	Boca Juniors	5
8	(Argentina) Giuliano Galoppo	River Plate	5
8	(Argentina) Alejo Véliz	Rosario Central	5
8	(Argentina) Alexis Cuello	San Lorenzo	5
8	(Argentina) Ignacio Russo	Tigre	5
8	(Argentina) Cristian Tarragona	Unión	5

Source: AFA

==== Top assists ====
Rank	Player	Club	Assists
1	(Argentina) Mateo Del Blanco	Unión	6
2	(Argentina) Nicolás Laméndola	Atlético Tucumán	5
2	(Colombia) Edwuin Cetré	Estudiantes (LP)	5
2	(Argentina) Gabriel Rojas	Racing	5
5	(Argentina) Facundo Bruera	Barracas Central	4
5	(Argentina) Leandro Paredes	Boca Juniors	4
5	(Argentina) Alexander Díaz	Deportivo Riestra	4

Source: AFA

== Aggregate table ==
=== International qualification ===
The 2025 Torneo Apertura champions, 2025 Torneo Clausura champions and 2025 Copa Argentina champions earned a berth to the 2026 Copa Libertadores. The remaining berths to the 2026 Copa Libertadores as well as the ones to the 2026 Copa Sudamericana were determined by an aggregate table from the group stages of the 2025 Torneo Apertura and 2025 Torneo Clausura. The top three teams in the aggregate table not already qualified for any international tournament qualified for the Copa Libertadores, while the next six teams qualified for the Copa Sudamericana.

=== Relegation ===
In this season, the bottom team of the aggregate table was relegated to the 2026 Primera Nacional. If two or more teams were level on points, extra matches would be played to decide which team would be relegated.

=== Campeón de Liga ===
On 20 November 2025, the AFA awarded Rosario Central the official title of "Campeón de Liga" for having earned the most points in the aggregate table.

Pos	Team	Pld	W	D	L	GF	GA	GD	Pts	Qualification or relegation
1	Rosario Central (C)	32	18	12	2	40	16	+24	66	Qualification for Copa Libertadores group stage
2	Boca Juniors	32	18	8	6	52	23	+29	62	Qualification for Copa Libertadores group stage
3	Argentinos Juniors	32	16	9	7	42	22	+20	57	Qualification for Copa Libertadores second stage
4	River Plate	32	14	11	7	41	24	+17	53	Qualification for Copa Sudamericana group stage
5	Racing	32	16	5	11	42	29	+13	53	Qualification for Copa Sudamericana group stage
6	Deportivo Riestra	32	13	13	6	32	19	+13	52	Qualification for Copa Sudamericana group stage
7	San Lorenzo	32	13	12	7	27	21	+6	51	Qualification for Copa Sudamericana group stage
8	Lanús	32	13	11	8	33	24	+9	50	Qualification for Copa Libertadores group stage (Note: Lanús, Platense, Estudiantes (LP) and Independiente Rivadavia qualified for the Copa Libertadores group stage by winning the 2025 Copa Sudamericana, the 2025 Torneo Apertura, the 2025 Torneo Clausura and the 2025 Copa Argentina, respectively.)
9	Tigre	32	13	10	9	32	25	+7	49	Qualification for Copa Sudamericana group stage
10	Barracas Central	32	12	13	7	39	35	+4	49	Qualification for Copa Sudamericana group stage
11	Independiente	32	12	11	9	37	25	+12	47	
12	Huracán	32	12	11	9	29	27	+2	47	
13	Independiente Rivadavia	32	10	13	9	34	34	0	43	Qualification for Copa Libertadores group stage
14	Central Córdoba (SdE)	32	10	12	10	38	33	+5	42	
15	Estudiantes (LP)	32	11	9	12	35	37	−2	42	Qualification for Copa Libertadores group stage
16	Vélez Sarsfield	32	11	7	14	26	34	−8	40	
17	Unión	32	9	12	11	31	30	+1	39	
18	Defensa y Justicia	32	10	8	14	32	41	−9	38	
19	Gimnasia y Esgrima (LP)	32	11	5	16	23	34	−11	38	
20	Belgrano	32	7	16	9	26	34	−8	37	
21	Banfield	32	9	8	15	29	40	−11	35	
22	Platense	32	8	11	13	25	36	−11	35	Qualification for Copa Libertadores group stage
23	Sarmiento (J)	32	7	14	11	24	36	−12	35	
24	Talleres (C)	32	7	13	12	20	27	−7	34	
25	Atlético Tucumán	32	10	4	18	34	43	−9	34	
26	Instituto	32	8	10	14	25	37	−12	34	
27	Newell's Old Boys	32	8	9	15	25	38	−13	33	
28	Aldosivi	32	9	6	17	31	46	−15	33	
29	Godoy Cruz (R)	32	4	17	11	19	37	−18	29	Relegation to Primera Nacional (Note: San Martín (SJ) were relegated based on coefficients.)
30	San Martín (SJ) (R)	32	6	10	16	18	34	−16	28	Relegation to Primera Nacional

Source: AFA
Rules for classification: 1) points; 2) goal difference; 3) goals scored; 4) head-to-head results 5) fair play ranking 6) drawing of lots.
(C) Champions; (R) Relegated

== Relegation based on coefficients ==
In addition to the relegation based on the aggregate table, one team was relegated at the end of the season based on coefficients, which took into consideration the points obtained by the clubs during the present season (aggregate table points) and the two previous seasons (only seasons at the top flight were counted). The total tally was then divided by the number of games played in the top flight over those three seasons, and an average was calculated. The team with the worst average at the end of the season was relegated to Primera Nacional.

Pos	Team	2023 Pts	2024 Pts	2025 Pts	Total Pts	Total Pld	Avg	Relegation
1	River Plate	85	70	53	208	114	1.825	
2	Boca Juniors	62	67	62	191	114	1.675	
3	Racing	60	70	53	183	114	1.605	
4	Rosario Central	65	47	66	178	114	1.561	
5	Talleres (C)	67	72	34	173	114	1.518	
6	Argentinos Juniors	54	56	57	167	114	1.465	
7	Estudiantes (LP)	62	63	42	167	114	1.465	
8	Lanús	57	59	50	166	114	1.456	
9	Vélez Sarsfield	49	76	40	165	114	1.447	
10	Independiente	51	63	47	161	114	1.412	
11	Huracán	51	62	47	160	114	1.404	
12	San Lorenzo	64	45	51	160	114	1.404	
13	Deportivo Riestra	—	48	52	100	73	1.37	
14	Godoy Cruz	63	64	29	156	114	1.368	
15	Defensa y Justicia	58	58	38	154	114	1.351	
16	Barracas Central	49	49	49	147	114	1.289	
17	Platense	54	57	35	146	114	1.281	
18	Unión	46	60	39	145	114	1.272	
19	Belgrano	57	49	37	143	114	1.254	
20	Instituto	52	53	34	139	114	1.219	
21	Independiente Rivadavia	—	46	43	89	73	1.219	
22	Atlético Tucumán	54	50	34	138	114	1.211	
23	Newell's Old Boys	53	49	33	135	114	1.184	
24	Tigre	47	39	49	135	114	1.184	
25	Central Córdoba (SdE)	48	42	42	132	114	1.158	
26	Gimnasia y Esgrima (LP)	45	48	38	131	114	1.149	
27	Banfield	53	41	35	129	114	1.132	
28	Aldosivi	—	—	33	33	32	1.031	
29	Sarmiento (J)	46	35	35	116	114	1.018	
30	San Martín (SJ) (R)	—	—	28	28	32	0.875	Relegation to Primera Nacional

Source: AFA

== Attendances ==
Pos	Team	Average attendance
1	River Plate	84,782
2	Talleres (C)	52,624
3	Boca Juniors	52,478
4	Racing	50,180
5	Rosario Central	46,755
6	San Lorenzo	46,349
7	Independiente	45,414
8	Newell's Old Boys	42,000
9	Belgrano	38,393
10	Estudiantes (LP)	32,384
11	Huracán	30,275
12	Gimnasia y Esgrima (LP)	28,290
13	Atlético Tucumán	26,652
14	Unión	26,491
15	Vélez Sarsfield	24,364
16	Independiente Rivadavia	23,147
17	Banfield	20,273
18	Tigre	17,735
19	San Martín (SJ)	17,447
20	Aldosivi	17,304
21	Godoy Cruz	17,250
22	Argentinos Juniors	16,858
23	Instituto	15,485
24	Platense	13,842
25	Lanús	12,745
26	Central Córdoba (SdE)	8,107
27	Defensa y Justicia	7,092
28	Sarmiento (J)	3,456
29	Deportivo Riestra	2,916
30	Barracas Central	510

== See also ==
- 2025 Copa Argentina
