= 2025 Club de Gimnasia y Esgrima La Plata season =

Club de Gimnasia y Esgrima La Plata
2025 season
- Manager: Marcelo Méndez (until 30 January); Alejandro Orfila; Fernando Zaniratto (from 14 October)
- Stadium: Estadio Juan Carmelo Zerillo
- Torneo Apertura: 11th
- Torneo Clausura: Semi-finals
- Copa Argentina: Round of 32
Home colours	Away colours

The 2025 season was the 138th for Club de Gimnasia y Esgrima La Plata and their 11th consecutive season in the Primera División. The club also took part in the Copa Argentina.

== Squad ==
=== Transfers In ===
Pos.	Player	Transferred from	Fee	Date	Source
DF	(Argentina) Renzo Giampaoli	(Argentina) Boca Juniors	Loan	16 January 2025	
FW	(Venezuela) Jan Carlos Hurtado	(Argentina) Boca Juniors	Free	27 February 2025	
FW	(Argentina) Maximiliano Zalazar	(Argentina) Boca Juniors	Loan	30 June 2025	
FW	(Colombia) Juan José Pérez	(Argentina) Godoy Cruz	Undisclosed	7 July 2025	
FW	(Argentina) Marcelo Torres	(United Arab Emirates) Dubai United	Undisclosed	8 July 2025	

=== Transfers Out ===
Pos.	Player	Transferred to	Fee	Date	Source
DF	(Argentina) Guillermo Enrique	(Peru) Alianza Lima	Loan	3 January 2025	

== Exhibition matches ==
15 January 2025	Defensor Sporting (Uruguay)	2–3	(Argentina) Gimnasia

16 January 2025	Uruguay U20	2–3	(Argentina) Gimnasia

18 January 2025	Cerro Largo (Uruguay)	0–1	(Argentina) Gimnasia

== Competitions ==
=== Overall record ===
Competition	First match	Last match	Starting round	Final position	Record							
Competition	First match	Last match	Starting round	Final position	Pld	W	D	L	GF	GA	GD	Win %
Torneo Apertura	25 January 2025	4 May 2025	Matchday 1	11th	16	4	4	8	9	18	−9	25.00
Torneo Clausura	12 July 2025	8 December 2025	Matchday 1	Semi-finals	19	9	1	9	18	18	+0	47.37
Copa Argentina	5 February 2025	11 May 2025	Round of 64	Round of 32	2	1	1	0	2	1	+1	50.00
Total					37	14	6	17	29	37	−8	37.84

Source: Competitions

=== Primera División ===
==== Torneo Apertura ====
===== League table =====
Pos	Team	Pld	W	D	L	GF	GA	GD	Pts
9	Godoy Cruz	16	3	8	5	8	18	−10	17
10	Atlético Tucumán	16	5	1	10	17	21	−4	16
11	Gimnasia y Esgrima (LP)	16	4	4	8	9	18	−9	16
12	Sarmiento (J)	16	2	9	5	11	19	−8	15
13	Vélez Sarsfield	16	4	2	10	7	22	−15	14

Source: AFA

===== Results by round =====
Round	1	2	3	4	5	6	7	8	9	10	11	12	13	14	15	16
Ground	A	H	A	H	A	H	A	A	H	A	H	A	H	H	A	H
Result	L	L	L	W	D	W	W	L	D	L	D	L	D	L	L	W
Position	13	15	15	10	11	10	6	6	6	9	8	10	11	13	14	11

A = Away; H = Home; W = Win; D = Draw; L = Loss

===== Matches =====
25 January 2025 1	Instituto	3–0	Gimnasia y Esgrima
19:15 UTC−3

29 January 2025 2	Gimnasia y Esgrima	0–2	San Lorenzo

2 February 2025 3	Independiente	2–0	Gimnasia y Esgrima

9 February 2025 4	Gimnasia y Esgrima	3–0	Godoy Cruz

13 February 2025 5	Lanús	0–0	Gimnasia y Esgrima

17 February 2025 6	Gimnasia y Esgrima	1–0	San Martín

23 February 2025 7	Atlético Tucumán	0–1	Gimnasia y Esgrima

1 March 2025 8	Unión	1–0	Gimnasia y Esgrima

10 March 2025 9	Gimnasia y Esgrima	1–1	Deportivo Riestra

15 March 2025 10	Rosario Central	2–1	Gimnasia y Esgrima

30 March 2025 11	Gimnasia y Esgrima	0–0	Sarmiento

5 April 2025 12	Talleres	2–0	Gimnasia y Esgrima

13 April 2025 13	Gimnasia y Esgrima	1–1	Estudiantes

18 April 2025 14	Gimnasia y Esgrima	0–3	River Plate

28 April 2025 15	Vélez Sarsfield	1–0	Gimnasia y Esgrima

4 May 2025 16	Gimnasia y Esgrima	1–0	Platense

==== Torneo Clausura ====
===== League table =====
Pos	Team	Pld	W	D	L	GF	GA	GD	Pts	Qualification
5	San Lorenzo	16	6	6	4	13	11	+2	24	Advance to round of 16
6	River Plate	16	6	4	6	20	15	+5	22	Advance to round of 16
7	Gimnasia y Esgrima (LP)	16	7	1	8	14	16	−2	22	Advance to round of 16
8	Talleres (C)	16	5	6	5	9	12	−3	21	Advance to round of 16
9	Sarmiento (J)	16	5	5	6	13	17	−4	20	

Source: AFA

===== Matches =====
12 July 2025 1	Gimnasia y Esgrima	0–1	Instituto	La Plata
18:30 UTC−3		Report	Luna 44'	Stadium: Estadio Juan Carmelo Zerillo

19 July 2025 2	San Lorenzo	0–0	Gimnasia y Esgrima	Buenos Aires
14:30 UTC−3		Report		Stadium: Estadio Pedro Bidegain

27 July 2025 3	Gimnasia y Esgrima	1–0	Independiente	La Plata
: UTC−3	Suso 24'	Report		Stadium: Estadio Juan Carmelo Zerillo

7 August 2025 4	Godoy Cruz	1–2	Gimnasia y Esgrima	Godoy Cruz
17:00 UTC−3	Auzmendi 90+1'	Report	Panaro 27'; Torres 30'	Stadium: Estadio Feliciano Gambarte

17 August 2025 5	Gimnasia y Esgrima	1–2	Lanús	La Plata
14:00 UTC−3	Torres 42'	Report	Canale 55'; Watson 62'	Stadium: Estadio Juan Carmelo Zerillo

23 August 2025 6	San Martín	1–0	Gimnasia y Esgrima	San Juan
20:00 UTC−3	Iacobellis 54' (pen.)	Report		Stadium: Estadio Ingeniero Hilario Sánchez

1 September 2025 7	Gimnasia y Esgrima	1–0	Atlético Tucumán	La Plata
14:00 UTC−3	Martínez 54' (o.g.)	Report		Stadium: Estadio Juan Carmelo Zerillo

14 September 2025 8	Gimnasia y Esgrima	1–3	Unión	La Plata
15:00 UTC−3	Torres 52'	Report	Del Blanco 47'; Tarragona 57'; Martínez 62'	Stadium: Estadio Juan Carmelo Zerillo

19 September 2025 9	Deportivo Riestra	1–0	Gimnasia y Esgrima	Buenos Aires
17:00 UTC−3	Céliz 54'	Report		Stadium: Estadio Guillermo Laza

27 September 2025 10	Gimnasia y Esgrima	0–3	Rosario Central	La Plata
14:30 UTC−3		Report	Véliz 2'; Giménez 83'; Di María 86'	Stadium: Estadio Juan Carmelo Zerillo

4 October 2025 11	Sarmiento	0–1	Gimnasia y Esgrima	Junín
14:30 UTC−3		Report	Torres 45+2' (pen.)	Stadium: Estadio Eva Perón

11 October 2025 12	Gimnasia y Esgrima	1–2	Talleres	La Plata
16:00 UTC−3	Merlini 7'	Report	Girotti 2'; Schott 90+3'	Stadium: Estadio Juan Carmelo Zerillo

19 October 2025 13	Estudiantes	2–0	Gimnasia y Esgrima	La Plata
15:00 UTC−3	Cetre 45+1'; Carrillo 52'	Report		Stadium: Estadio Jorge Luis Hirschi

2 November 2025 14	River Plate	0–1	Gimnasia y Esgrima	Buenos Aires
20:30 UTC−3		Report	M.Torres 55' (pen.)	Stadium: Estadio Monumental; Referee: Nazareno Arasa

10 November 2025 15	Gimnasia y Esgrima	2–0	Vélez Sarsfield	La Plata
17:00 UTC−3	Torres 34'; Merlo 68'	Report		Stadium: Estadio Juan Carmelo Zerillo

17 November 2025 16	Platense	0–3	Gimnasia y Esgrima	Florida
19:30 UTC−3		Report	Panaro 20'; M.Torres 41'; Torres 86'	Stadium: Estadio Ciudad de Vicente López

===== Final stages =====
24 November 2025 Round of 16	Unión	1–2	Gimnasia y Esgrima	Santa Fe
22:00	Tarragona 53'	Report	Panaro 17'; Martínez 23'	Stadium: 15 de Abril; Referee: Sebastián Martínez

1 December 2025 Quarter-finals	Barracas Central	0–2	Gimnasia y Esgrima	Buenos Aires
17:00		Report	Panaro 21'; F. Torres 90+2'	Stadium: Claudio "Chiqui" Tapia; Referee: Hernán Mastrángelo

8 December 2025 Semi-finals	Gimnasia y Esgrima	0–1	Estudiantes	La Plata
17:00		Report	Palacios 61'	Stadium: Juan Carmelo Zerillo; Referee: Facundo Tello

=== Copa Argentina ===
5 February 2025 Round of 64	Gimnasia y Esgrima	1–0	Deportivo Español	Quilmes
21:30	Castillo 51'	Report		Stadium: Centenario Ciudad de Quilmes; Referee: Franco Acita

11 May 2025 Round of 32	Central Córdoba (R)	1–1 (5–4 p)	Gimnasia y Esgrima	San Nicolás de los Arroyos
15:30	Marín 90'	Report	Merlini 70'	Stadium: Único de San Nicolás; Referee: Luis Lobo Medina
	Penalties
	Killer (penalty scored); Sierra (penalty scored); T. Ramírez (penalty scored); Marín (penalty missed); Di Vanni (penalty scored); Vranjicán (penalty scored)		(penalty missed) Castillo; (penalty scored) Suso; (penalty scored) Mammini; (penalty scored) Di Biasi; (penalty scored) Mamut; (penalty missed) Piedrahita
