= 2025 Club Atlético Aldosivi season =

Club Atlético Aldosivi
2025 season
- Manager: Andrés Yllana (until 11 March); Mariano Charlier
- Stadium: Estadio José María Minella
- Primera División: Apertura: 13th
- Copa Argentina: Round of 16

The 2025 season is the 110th since the establishment of Club Atlético Aldosivi and marks their return to the Primera División following promotion. The club will also participate in the Copa Argentina.

== Squad ==
=== Transfers In ===
Pos.	Player	Transferred from	Fee	Date	Source
DF	(Argentina) Tomás Kummer	(Argentina) Talleres de Córdoba II	Loan	15 January 2025	
FW	(Uruguay) Emiliano Rodríguez	(Colombia) Deportivo Cali	Free	23 July 2025	
FW	(Syria) Tobías Cervera	(Argentina) Rosario Central	Loan	23 July 2025	

== Competitions ==
=== Overall record ===
Competition	First match	Last match	Starting round	Record							
Competition	First match	Last match	Starting round	Pld	W	D	L	GF	GA	GD	Win %
Primera División	26 January 2025		Matchday 1	0	0	0	0	0	0	+0	—
Copa Argentina				0	0	0	0	0	0	+0	—
Total				0	0	0	0	0	0	+0	—

Source: Competitions

=== Primera División ===
==== Torneo Apertura ====
===== League table =====
Pos	Team	Pld	W	D	L	GF	GA	GD	Pts
11	Central Córdoba (SdE)	16	5	3	8	21	22	−1	18
12	Belgrano	16	3	8	5	13	23	−10	17
13	Aldosivi	16	4	3	9	18	28	−10	15
14	Banfield	16	3	5	8	14	19	−5	14
15	Unión	16	3	5	8	11	17	−6	14

Source: AFA

===== Results by round =====
Round	1
Ground	A
Result	
Position	

A = Away; H = Home; W = Win; D = Draw; L = Loss

===== Matches =====
26 January 2025 1	Central Córdoba	1–0	Aldosivi	Santiago del Estero
21:00 UTC−3	Verón 74'	Report		Stadium: Alfredo Terrera

30 January 2025 2	Aldosivi	0–5	Defensa y Justicia

2 February 2025 3	Newell's Old Boys	1–0	Aldosivi

6 February 2025 4	Aldosivi	1–3	Barracas Central

11 February 2025 5	Belgrano	2–0	Aldosivi

15 February 2025 6	Aldosivi	2–2	Estudiantes

22 February 2025 7	Boca Juniors	2–1	Aldosivi

1 March 2025 8	Aldosivi	2–2	Sarmiento

9 March 2025 9	Aldosivi	0–2	Tigre

14 March 2025 10	Argentinos Juniors	0–2	Aldosivi

27 March 2025 11	Aldosivi	2–1	Unión

5 April 2025 12	Huracán	3–3	Aldosivi

14 April 2025 13	Aldosivi	0–2	Racing

22 April 2025 14	Independiente Rivadavia	1–0	Aldosivi

26 April 2025 15	Aldosivi	2–1	Banfield

4 May 2025 16	San Martín	0–3	Aldosivi

==== Torneo Clausura ====
===== League table =====
Pos	Team	Pld	W	D	L	GF	GA	GD	Pts
11	Huracán	16	5	5	6	10	15	−5	20
12	Defensa y Justicia	16	5	4	7	14	19	−5	19
13	Aldosivi	16	5	3	8	13	18	−5	18
14	Independiente Rivadavia	16	3	7	6	14	17	−3	16
15	Newell's Old Boys	16	3	5	8	13	23	−10	14

Source: AFA

===== Matches =====
11 July 2025 1	Aldosivi	0–0	Central Córdoba	Mar del Plata
15:30 UTC−3		Report		Stadium: Estadio José María Minella

21 July 2025 2	Defensa y Justicia	2–0	Aldosivi	Gobernador Costa
21:15 UTC−3	Delgado 67'; Miritello 76'	Report		Stadium: Estadio Norberto "Tito" Tomaghello

26 July 2025 3	Aldosivi	0–0	Newell's Old Boys	Mar del Plata
14:30 UTC−3		Report		Stadium: Estadio José María Minella

10 August 2025 4	Barracas Central	3–1	Aldosivi	Buenos Aires
15:00 UTC−3	Bruera 28', 58'; Morales 48'	Report	Serrago 50'	Stadium: Estadio Claudio Chiqui Tapia

15 August 2025 5	Aldosivi	0–0	Belgrano	Mar del Plata
15:30 UTC−3		Report		Stadium: Estadio José María Minella

25 August 2025 6	Estudiantes	1–0	Aldosivi	La Plata
19:15 UTC−3	González Pírez 12'	Report		Stadium: Estadio Jorge Luis Hirschi

31 August 2025 7	Aldosivi	0–2	Boca Juniors	Mar del Plata
14:30 UTC−3		Report	Di Lollo 45+1'; Battaglia 80'	Stadium: José María Minella; Referee: Sebastián Zunino

=== Copa Argentina ===
19 March 2025 Round of 64	Aldosivi	1–1 (6–5 p)	Gimnasia y Tiro	Sarandí
15:45	Chávez 45+2'	Report	Galetto 31'	Stadium: Julio Humberto Grondona; Referee: Bruno Amiconi
	Penalties
	Torres (penalty scored); Guerrico (penalty scored); Serrago (penalty scored); Guzmán (penalty scored); Giani (penalty scored); Cerato (penalty scored)		(penalty scored) Díaz; (penalty scored) Monti; (penalty scored) Villalva; (penalty scored) Busse; (penalty scored) Galetto; (penalty missed) Morello

1 June 2025 Round of 32	Estudiantes	1–1 (2–4 p)	Aldosivi	Florencio Varela
13:10	Castro 15'	Report	Giani 25'	Stadium: Norberto "Tito" Tomaghello; Referee: Bryan Ferreyra
	Penalties
	Castro (penalty missed); Benedetti (penalty scored); Arzamendia (penalty missed); Ascacíbar (penalty scored)		(penalty scored) Torres; (penalty scored) Preciado; (penalty scored) Breitenbruch; (penalty scored) Guerrico

31 July 2025 Round of 16	Aldosivi	1–2	Argentinos Juniors	Florencio Varela
21:10	Cerato 45'	Report	Lescano 77'; Molina 84' (pen.)	Stadium: Norberto "Tito" Tomaghello; Referee: Fernando Espinoza
