= 1976 Liga Deportiva Universitaria de Quito season =

L.D.U. Quito
1976 season
- President: Rodrigo Paz
- Manager: Leonel Montoya
- Stadium: Estadio Olímpico Atahualpa
- Serie A: 4th
- Copa Libertadores: Semi-finals
- Top goalscorer: League: Polo Carrera (14 goals); All: Polo Carrera (17 goals)
Home colours	Away colours

Liga Deportiva Universitaria de Quito's 1976 season was the club's 46th year of existence, the 23rd year in professional football and the 16th in the top level of professional football in Ecuador.

== Squad ==
No.	Pos.	Nation	Player
—	GK	ECU	Adolfo Bolaños
—	GK	ARG	Miguel Ángel Leyes
—	GK	URU	Walter Maesso
—	DF	URU	Luis De Carlos
—	DF	ECU	Humboldt De La Torre
—	DF	ECU	Ramiro Del Pozo
—	DF	ECU	Fernando Villena
—	DF	ECU	Patricio Maldonado
—	DF	ECU	Ramiro Tobar (captain)
—	MF	ECU	Ángel Aguirre
—	MF	ECU	Polo Carrera
—	MF	URU	Juan Carlos Gómez

No.	Pos.	Nation	Player
—	MF	ECU	Juan Rivadeneira
—	MF	ECU	Roberto Sussman
—	MF	ECU	Jorge Tapia
—	FW	ECU	Ramiro Aguirre
—	FW	ECU	Marco Moreno
—	FW	ARG	Juan José Pérez
—	FW	ARG	Alberto Pinasco
—	FW	ARG	Rubén Scalise
—	FW	ECU	Gustavo Tapia
—	FW	ECU	Hernán Vaca
—	FW	URU	Oscar Zubía

== Competitions ==
=== Serie A ===
==== First stage ====
Pos	Team	Pld	W	D	L	GF	GA	GD	Pts	Qualification or relegation
1	El Nacional	18	13	2	3	36	21	+15	28	Qualified to the Liguilla Final
2	Emelec	18	9	5	4	29	24	+5	23	Qualified to the Liguilla Final
3	Deportivo Cuenca	18	8	5	5	34	21	+13	21	Qualified to the Liguilla Final
4	Audaz Octubrino	18	8	5	5	30	27	+3	21	
5	L.D.U. Quito	18	6	6	6	26	22	+4	18	
6	Barcelona	18	5	6	7	26	20	+6	16	
7	Universidad Católica	18	6	4	8	26	22	+4	16	
8	Aucas	18	6	4	8	18	28	−10	16	
9	América de Quito	18	4	4	10	23	36	−13	12	Relegated to the Serie B
10	9 de Octubre	18	3	3	12	11	38	−27	9	Relegated to the Serie B

===== Results =====
Home \ Away	9DO	CDA	SDA	AO	BSC	CDC	EN	CSE	LDQ	UC
9 de Octubre									1–1	
América de Quito									3–3	
Aucas									1–0	
Audaz Octubrino									1–1	
Barcelona									2–1	
Deportivo Cuenca									2–0	
El Nacional									1–0	
Emelec									2–1	
L.D.U. Quito	3–1	1–0	0–1	4–2	2–1	2–2	2–1	4–0		0–0
Universidad Católica									1–1	

Source: RSSSF
Legend: Blue = home team win; Yellow = draw; Red = away team win.

==== Second stage ====
Pos	Team	Pld	W	D	L	GF	GA	GD	Pts	Qualification or relegation
1	El Nacional	18	10	3	5	35	19	+16	23	Qualified to the Liguilla Final
2	L.D.U. Quito	18	8	5	5	27	21	+6	21	Qualified to the Liguilla Final
3	Deportivo Cuenca	18	8	4	6	28	20	+8	20	Qualified to the Liguilla Final
4	Emelec	18	6	7	5	23	19	+4	19	
5	Aucas	18	7	5	6	22	27	−5	19	
6	Barcelona	18	6	6	6	24	21	+3	18	
7	Carmen Mora	18	5	7	6	22	27	−5	17	
8	Universidad Católica	18	5	6	7	20	22	−2	16	
9	Deportivo Quito	18	5	6	7	18	26	−8	16	Relegated to the Serie B
10	Audaz Octubrino	18	3	5	10	17	34	−17	11	Relegated to the Serie B

===== Results =====
Home \ Away	SDA	AO	BSC	CME	CDC	SDQ	EN	CSE	LDQ	UC
Aucas									2–1	
Audaz Octubrino									0–2	
Barcelona									0–1	
Carmen Mora									4–3	
Deportivo Cuenca									2–1	
Deportivo Quito									0–1	
El Nacional									3–1	
Emelec									1–1	
L.D.U. Quito	2–3	0–0	2–0	2–1	0–0	1–1	2–2	2–1		3–1
Universidad Católica									0–2	

Source: RSSSF
Legend: Blue = home team win; Yellow = draw; Red = away team win.

==== Liguilla Final ====
Pos	Team	Pld	W	D	L	GF	GA	GD	Pts	Qualification
1	El Nacional	6	3	2	1	8	6	+2	14	Champions and Qualified to the 1977 Copa Libertadores
2	Deportivo Cuenca	6	3	1	2	5	5	0	9	
3	Emelec	6	3	1	2	6	8	−2	9	
4	L.D.U. Quito	6	1	0	5	6	7	−1	4	

Note: Includes bonus points earned in previous stages: El Nacional (6); D. Cuenca, Emelec & LDU Quito (2).

===== Results =====
Home \ Away	CDC	EN	CSE	LDQ
Deportivo Cuenca				2–1
El Nacional				1–0
Emelec				1–0
L.D.U. Quito	0–1	1–2	4–0	

Source: RSSSF
Legend: Blue = home team win; Yellow = draw; Red = away team win.

=== Copa Libertadores ===
==== First stage ====
Group 2 standings
Pos	Team	Pld	W	D	L	GF	GA	GD	Pts	Qualification	(Ecuador) LDQ	(Ecuador) CDC	(Bolivia) BOL	(Bolivia) GUA
1	(Ecuador) LDU Quito	6	3	2	1	10	5	+5	8	Qualified to the 1st Place Playoff	—	1–1	2–1	4–0
2	(Ecuador) Deportivo Cuenca	6	3	2	1	9	6	+3	8	Qualified to the 1st Place Playoff	0–0	—	3–1	1–0
3	(Bolivia) Bolívar	6	3	0	3	16	11	+5	6		3–2	4–2	—	7–1
4	(Bolivia) Guabirá	6	1	0	5	2	15	−13	2		0–1	0–2	1–0	—

Legend: Blue = home team win; Yellow = draw; Red = away team win.

March 14 First Stage	L.D.U. Quito (Ecuador)	1–1	(Ecuador) Deportivo Cuenca	Quito, Ecuador
	Zubía 26'	Report	Mesiano 29'	Stadium: Estadio Olímpico Atahualpa; Referee: Mario Canessa (Chile)

March 21 First Stage	L.D.U. Quito (Ecuador)	4–0	(Bolivia) Guabirá	Quito, Ecuador
	Pérez 32', 70' (pen.), 72', 88'	Report		Stadium: Estadio Olímpico Atahualpa; Referee: José Castro Lozada (Venezuela)

March 24 First Stage	L.D.U. Quito (Ecuador)	2–1	(Bolivia) Bolívar	Quito, Ecuador
	Pérez 17'; Carrera 65'	Report	Aragonés 35'	Stadium: Estadio Olímpico Atahualpa; Referee: José Martínez Bazan (Uruguay)

April 4 First Stage	Deportivo Cuenca (Ecuador)	0–0	(Ecuador) L.D.U. Quito	Cuenca, Ecuador
		Report		Stadium: Estadio Alejandro Serrano Aguilar; Referee: Enrique Labo Revoredo (Peru)

April 11 First Stage	Guabirá (Bolivia)	0–1	(Ecuador) L.D.U. Quito	Santa Cruz de la Sierra, Bolivia
		Report	Scalise 4'	Stadium: Estadio Ramón Tahuichi Aguilera; Referee: Gregorio da Rosa (Uruguay)

April 14 First Stage	Bolívar (Bolivia)	3–2	(Ecuador) L.D.U. Quito	La Paz, Bolivia
	Lird 3'; Aragonés 52'; Solórzano 84'	Report	G. Tapia 42'; Carrera 54'	Stadium: Estadio Libertador Simón Bolívar; Referee: Enrique Labo Revoredo] (Peru)

==== 1st Place Playoff ====
Playoff standings
Pos	Team	Pld	W	D	L	GF	GA	GD	Pts	Qualification
1	(Ecuador) LDU Quito	1	1	0	0	2	1	+1	2	Qualified to the Semi-Finals
2	(Ecuador) Deportivo Cuenca	1	0	0	1	1	2	−1	0	

April 22 First Stage	LDU Quito (Ecuador)	2–1 (a.e.t.)	(Ecuador) Deportivo Cuenca	Guayaquil, Ecuador
	Carrera 66'; Rivadeneira 115'	Report	Villagra 63'	Stadium: Estadio Modelo Alberto Spencer Herrera; Attendance: 50,000; Referee: Óscar Veiro (Argentina)

==== Semi-finals ====
Group 1 standings
Pos	Team	Pld	W	D	L	GF	GA	GD	Pts	Qualification	(Brazil) CRU	(Ecuador) LDQ	(Peru) ALI
1	(Brazil) Cruzeiro	4	4	0	0	18	3	+15	8	Qualified to the Final	—	4–1	7–1
2	(Ecuador) LDU Quito	4	1	0	3	4	10	−6	2		1–3	—	2–1
3	(Peru) Alianza Lima	4	1	0	3	4	13	−9	2		0–4	2–0	—

Legend: Blue = home team win; Yellow = draw; Red = away team win.

May 5 Semi-finals	L.D.U. Quito (Ecuador)	2–1	(Peru) Alianza Lima	Quito, Ecuador
	Scalise 66'; De Carlos 84'	Report	Velásquez 40'	Stadium: Estadio Olímpico Atahualpa; Referee: Guillermo Velásquez (Colombia)

May 9 Semi-finals	L.D.U. Quito (Ecuador)	1–3	(Brazil) Cruzeiro	Quito, Ecuador
	Carrera 66' (pen.)	Report	Palhinha 30', 56'; Joãozinho 58'	Stadium: Estadio Olímpico Atahualpa; Referee: Ángel Coerezza (Argentina)

May 26 Semi-finals	Alianza Lima (Peru)	2–0	(Ecuador) L.D.U. Quito	Lima, Peru
	Ravello 62', 69' (pen.)	Report		Stadium: Estadio Alejandro Villanueva; Referee: Arturo Ithurralde (Argentina)

May 30 Semi-finals	Cruzeiro (Brazil)	4–1	(Ecuador) L.D.U. Quito	Belo Horizonte, Brazil
	Nelinho 4' (pen.); Jairzinho 47'; Palhinha 72'; Ronaldo 74'	Report	G. Tapia 11'	Stadium: Mineirão; Referee: Ángel Coerezza (Argentina)
