= Rodolfo Flores =

Rodolfo Flores may refer to:

- Rodolfo P. Flores, Costa Rican politician
- Rodolfo Montiel Flores, Mexican subsistence farmer
- Diego Flores (footballer) (Rodolfo Diego Flores), Argentine football manager and player
