= Giuliano Cerato =

Argentine footballer

Personal information
- Full name: Giuliano Cerato
- Date of birth: 10 June 1998 (age 28)
- Place of birth: Río Cuarto, Córdoba, Argentina
- Height: 1.70 m (5 ft 7 in)
- Position: Right-back

Team information
- Current team: Instituto
- Number: 44

Youth career
- Vélez Sarsfield

Senior career*
Years	Team	Apps	(Gls)
2019–2022	Vélez Sarsfield	0	(0)
2019–2021	→ UAI Urquiza (loan)	61	(10)
2022–	Instituto	91	(4)
2025	→ Aldosivi (loan)	29	(2)
- * Club domestic league appearances and goals as of 18:17, 10 May 2026 (UTC)

Giuliano Cerato (born 10 June 1998) is an Argentine professional footballer who plays as a right-back for Instituto.

== Career ==
Cerato came through the youth setup at Vélez Sarsfield and signed his first professional contract on 28 June 2019. A few weeks later he left for Primera B Metropolitana side UAI Urquiza on a two-year loan. On 29 September he scored his first goals for the club as he netted twice in a 4–2 win over San Miguel.

On 28 December 2021, he rescinded his contract with Vélez, after his loan at UAI Urquiza ended, and then joined Primera Nacional club Instituto. The following season, he held down a starting position and helped Instituto achieve promotion to the Liga Profesional.

On 21 January 2025, he joined newly promoted side Aldosivi on loan for a year, with an option to buy. He scored against Huracán in a 2–0 on 12 October. Aldosivi did not exercise the buy option and he returned to Instituto. He scored his first goal since returning on 20 February 2026 in a 2–1 victory against Atlético Tucumán.

== Career statistics ==
As of 21 February 2026

Appearances and goals by club, season and competition
Club	Season	League			Cup (Note: Includes Copa Argentina)		Continental		Other		Total	
Club	Season	Division	Goals	Apps	Apps	Goals	Apps	Goals	Apps	Goals	Apps	Goals
UAI Urquiza (loan)	2019–20	Primera B Metropolitana	26	4	—		—		—		26	4
UAI Urquiza (loan)	2021	Primera B Metropolitana	35	6	—		—		—		35	6
UAI Urquiza (loan)	Total		61	10	0	0	0	0	0	0	61	10
Instituto	2022	Primera Nacional	30	2	—		—		—		30	2
Instituto	2023	Liga Profesional	22	0	1	0	—		—		23	0
Instituto	2024	Liga Profesional	23	0	1	0	—		—		24	0
Instituto	2026	Liga Profesional	6	1	—		—		—		6	1
Instituto	Total		81	3	2	0	0	0	0	0	83	3
Aldosivi (loan)	2025	Liga Profesional	29	2	3	1	—		—		32	3
Career total			171	15	5	1	0	0	0	0	176	16
