= Alejandro Villarreal =

Colombian footballer (born 2005)

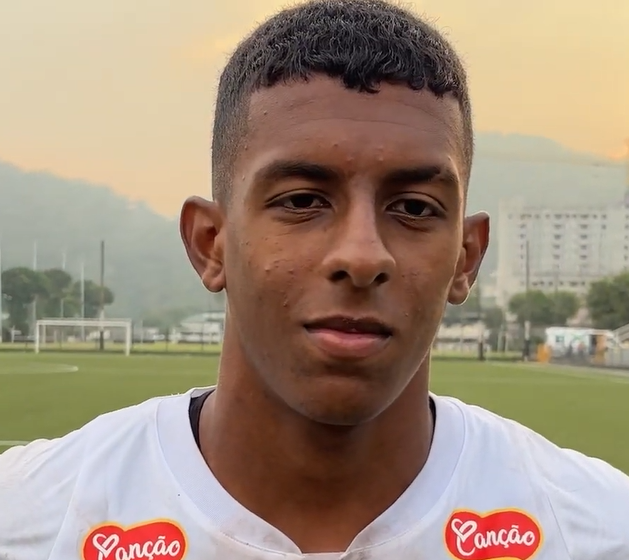
- Villarreal in 2024

Personal information
- Full name: Alejandro Villarreal Zuluaga
- Date of birth: 28 July 2005 (age 21)
- Place of birth: Medellín, Colombia
- Height: 1.86 m (6 ft 1 in)
- Position: Forward

Team information
- Current team: Caracas
- Number: 39

Youth career
- Leones del Sur
- América de Cali
- 2018–2024: Deportivo Cali
- 2024–2025: Santos

Senior career*
Years	Team	Apps	(Gls)
2024–2026	Santos	1	(0)
2025–2026	→ Aldosivi (loan)	11	(0)
2026–	Caracas	11	(2)

International career^{‡}
2025–	Colombia U20	6	(0)
Medal record
Men's football
Representing Colombia
South American U-20 Championship
Bronze medal – third place	2025 Venezuela
- * Club domestic league appearances and goals as of 17:41, 3 October 2026 (UTC) ‡ National team caps and goals as of 13:04, 18 February 2025 (UTC)

Alejandro Villarreal Zuluaga (born 28 July 2005) is a Colombian professional footballer who plays as a forward for Venezuelan club Caracas.

== Club career ==
=== Early career ===
Born in Medellín, Antioquia, Villarreal began his career in Cali at the age of six with EF Leones del Sur. He subsequently represented América de Cali before having a six-season spell in the youth sides of Deportivo Cali.

=== Santos ===
On 7 March 2024, Villarreal agreed to a deal with Brazilian club Santos, but his registration was not made on time as the Profeta only had an amateur deal at Deportivo Cali, which delayed the transfer clearance. He was only officially registered in July, and also trained with the first team squad; Cali also retained 10% of his economic rights.

Villarreal made his professional debut with Peixe on 17 August 2024, coming on as a second-half substitute for João Schmidt in a 1–0 Série B home loss to Avaí. He subsequently returned to the under-20 team.

=== Aldosivi ===
On 30 July 2025, Villarreal moved to Argentine Primera División side Aldosivi, with Santos retaining 20% over a future sale. He made his debut for the club on 15 August, replacing Tobías Cervera late into a 0–0 home draw against Belgrano.

== International career ==
On 20 August 2024, Villarreal was called up to the Colombia national under-20 team by manager César Torres for two friendlies against Uruguay, but was cut from the squad six days later.

== Career statistics ==
As of 21 April 2024

Club	Season	League			Cup		Continental		Total	
Club	Season	Division	Apps	Goals	Apps	Goals	Apps	Goals	Apps	Goals
Santos	2024	Série B	1	0	—		—		1	0
Aldosivi	2025	Argentine Primera División	1	0	—		—		1	0
Career total			2	0	0	0	0	0	2	0

== Honours ==
Santos

- Campeonato Brasileiro Série B: 2024
