= Diego Flores =

Diego Flores may refer to:

- Diego Flores (footballer) (born 1981), Argentine football manager and former footballer
- Diego Flores (chess player) (born 1982), Argentine chess player
- Diego Flores Hinojosa (born 1987), Mexican race walker
