= Fernando Zaniratto =

Argentine football manager and former player

Personal information
- Date of birth: 23 February 1981 (age 45)
- Place of birth: Saladillo, Argentina
- Height: 1.77 m (5 ft 10 in)
- Positions: Defender; defensive midfielder

Youth career
- Gimnasia La Plata

Senior career*
Years	Team	Apps	(Gls)
2001–2002	Gimnasia La Plata	25	(0)
2002–2003	Tiro Federal	17	(0)
2003–2004	Alghero		
2004–2005	La Palma Alghero		
2005–2006	Tempio	8	(0)
2006	Tortoli		
2006–2008	Castelsardo	33+	(0+)
2008–2009	Renato Curi Angolana		
2009–2010	Monterotondo		
2010–2011	Porto Torres		

Managerial career
- 2014–2015: Gimnasia La Plata (youth)
- 2015–2016: Villa San Carlos
- 2016–2017: Gimnasia La Plata (youth)
- 2017: Douglas Haig (assistant)
- 2017: Villa San Carlos (assistant)
- 2018–2021: SFP Gonnet
- 2021–2024: Gimnasia La Plata (youth)
- 2025: Gimnasia La Plata (reserves)
- 2025: Gimnasia La Plata (caretaker)
- 2025: Gimnasia La Plata (caretaker)
- 2026: Gimnasia La Plata
- * Club domestic league appearances and goals

Fernando Zaniratto (born 23 February 1981) is an Argentine professional football manager and former player who played as either a defender or a defensive midfielder.

== Playing career ==
Born in Saladillo, Buenos Aires, Zaniratto began his career with Gimnasia y Esgrima La Plata, making his first team – and Primera División – debut on 11 February 2001, in a 2–2 draw against San Lorenzo. Regularly used during that year, he lost space in 2002 and moved to Torneo Argentino A side Tiro Federal.

In 2003, Zaniratto moved to Italy and signed for Eccellenza side Alghero. In September 2004, after a brief period in Spain, he returned to the city to play for La Palma Alghero.

Zaniratto continued to play in the Italian lower levels until the end of his playing career, representing Tempio, Tortoli, Castelsardo, Renato Curi Angolana, Monterotondo and Porto Torres. He played in the Serie D with Castelsardo and Renato Curi for two consecutive years.

== Managerial career ==
After retiring, Zaniratto returned to Gimnasia in 2014, as a manager of the youth sides. He left to join Villa San Carlos in the following year, but returned to the club in 2016, as a coach of the fifth division.

In March 2017, Zaniratto became an assistant of Andrés Guglielminpietro at Douglas Haig. He returned to San Carlos in July, now as an assistant of Facundo Besada, before becoming the manager of amateur side SFP Gonnet in the following year.

Back to Gimnasia in 2021, Zaniratto was again in charge of the club's fifth division in the following year, before taking over the reserves on 19 December 2024. On 30 January 2025, he became the caretaker manager of the first team, after Marcelo Méndez resigned.

Back to the reserves after the arrival of Diego Flores, Zaniratto was again named caretaker on 14 October 2025, after Alejandro Orfila was sacked. On 17 December, he was permanently appointed manager of the club for the upcoming season.

Zaniratto was sacked from Gimnasia on 6 April 2026, after a 3–0 home loss to Huracán.
