= Ignacio Guerrico =

Argentine professional footballer

Personal information
- Date of birth: 9 July 1998 (age 28)
- Place of birth: La Plata, Argentina
- Height: 1.75 m (5 ft 9 in)
- Positions: Left-back; left midfielder

Team information
- Current team: Emelec
- Number: 3

Youth career
- 2012–2017: ADIP

Senior career*
Years	Team	Apps	(Gls)
2017–2018	ADIP	1	(0)
2018–2021	Villa San Carlos	37	(0)
2021–2024	Maribor	48	(0)
2021–2022	→ Tabor Sežana (loan)	9	(1)
2024–2026	Aldosivi	59	(0)
2026–	Emelec	2	(0)
- * Club domestic league appearances and goals as of 18:16, 9 March 2026 (UTC)

Ignacio Guerrico (born 9 July 1998) is an Argentine professional footballer who plays for Ecuadorian club Emelec. Primarily a left-back, he can also play as a left midfielder.

Guerrico also has Italian citizenship.

== Career ==
Guerrico began his career with Asociación Deportiva Infantil Platense (ADIP), where he made one appearance in Torneo Federal B, Argentina's fourth tier. In 2018, Guerrico moved across to Primera C Metropolitana's Villa San Carlos. They won promotion via the play-offs at the end of 2018–19, as he scored once (against Excursionistas in the final's first leg) across sixteen appearances. He made his Primera B Metropolitana debut on 26 August 2019 versus San Miguel, which preceded a further twenty-four appearances. With his contract set to expire on 31 January 2021, Guerrico was linked with moves to Europe and New Zealand. Overall, Guerrico made 53 appearances for Villa San Carlos in all competitions.

On 19 January 2021, Villa San Carlos announced that Guerrico had agreed a move to Slovenia with PrvaLiga outfit Maribor. He was officially revealed two days later, signing a two-year contract with the club.

== Career statistics ==
As of match played 20 April 2021

Appearances and goals by club, season and competition
Club	Season	League			National cup		Continental		Other		Total	
Club	Season	Division	Apps	Goals	Apps	Goals	Apps	Goals	Apps	Goals	Apps	Goals
ADIP	2017	Torneo Federal B	1	0	—		—		—		1	0
Villa San Carlos	2018–19	Primera C Metropolitana	12	0	—		—		4 (Note: Appearances in Primera C Metropolitana promotion play-offs)	1	16	1
Villa San Carlos	2019–20	Primera B Metropolitana	25	0	—		—		—		25	0
Villa San Carlos	Total		37	0	0	0	0	0	4	1	41 (Note: Incomplete; appearances in the Copa Argentina regional preliminary rounds are missing.)	1
Maribor	2020–21	Slovenian PrvaLiga	3	0	0	0	—		—		3	0
Career total			41	0	0	0	0	0	4	1	45	1
