= Mariano Charlier =

Argentine football manager

Personal information
- Date of birth: 20 April 1974 (age 52)
- Place of birth: Mar del Plata, Argentina

Youth career
- Years: Team
- Independiente MdP

Managerial career
- Independiente MdP (youth)
- 2010–2012: Unión de Mar del Plata (assistant)
- 2013–2014: Independiente MdP (youth)
- 2015–2021: Independiente MdP
- 2021–2022: Aldosivi (youth)
- 2023–2025: Aldosivi (reserves)
- 2023: Aldosivi (interim)
- 2025: Aldosivi (interim)
- 2025: Aldosivi

Mariano Charlier (born 20 April 1974) is an Argentine football manager.

== Career ==
Born in Mar del Plata, Charlier began his career managing the youth sides of hometown club Independiente de Mar del Plata, where he also played as a youth. After leaving the club to work as an assistant at Unión de Mar del Plata, he later returned to the side and was promoted to first team manager in 2015.

On 18 February 2021, Charlier left Independiente to join Aldosivi as a youth manager. Promoted to the reserves ahead of the 2023 season, he was appointed interim manager of the first team in September, after Walter Coyette resigned. He managed the club on seven occasions, having five draws and two losses.

After returning to the reserves, Charlier was again named interim of Aldosivi on 11 March 2025, after Andrés Yllana also resigned. On 3 April, after four wins in six matches, he was named as permanent manager of the club until the end of the 2025 Apertura tournament.

On 2 September 2025, Charlier was sacked by Aldosivi.

== Personal life ==
During the early stages of his managerial career, Charlier also worked as a lifeguard. His father Ricardo is also involved with football, being a secretary of the Liga Marplatense de Fútbol and also working at Independiente.
