= Miguel Leyes =

Argentine-Chilean footballer (born 1952)

Miguel Ángel Leyes (born 5 February 1952 in Buenos Aires, Argentina) is an Argentine naturalised Chilean former footballer and current manager who played for clubs in Argentina, Ecuador, Chile, Mexico and Ecuador.

== Teams ==
=== As player ===
- Huracán 1971–1975
- LDU Quito 1976
- Atlético Potosino 1976–1977
- Everton 1977–1978
- O'Higgins 1979–1980
- Colo-Colo 1981
- Universidad Católica 1982–1983
- Huracán 1984

=== As manager ===
- Rangers de Talca 1989
- Everton 1990

== Honours ==
Huracán

- Primera División Argentina - Campeonato Metropolitano: 1973, 1975

Colo-Colo

- Chilean Primera División Championship: 1981
