= Manuel Panaro =

Argentine professional footballer

Personal information
- Full name: Manuel Panaro Miramón
- Date of birth: 28 December 2002 (age 23)
- Place of birth: Bolívar, Argentina
- Height: 1.81 m (5 ft 11 in)
- Position: Forward

Team information
- Current team: Gimnasia LP
- Number: 7

Youth career
- Balonpié de Bolívar
- Aldosivi

Senior career*
Years	Team	Apps	(Gls)
2020–2024	Aldosivi	27	(1)
2024	Al Shahaniya	5	(3)
2024–	Gimnasia LP	51	(5)
- * Club domestic league appearances and goals as of 17:09, 9 July 2026 (UTC)

Manuel Panaro Miramón (born 28 December 2002) is an Argentine professional footballer who plays as a forward for Gimnasia LP.

== Career ==
Panaro began with local team Balonpié de Bolívar, before later joining Aldosivi. He progressed through their youth ranks, notably scoring for their reserves in a January 2020 friendly with Kimberley before making his competitive bow for them in February versus Banfield. Panaro was promoted into Guillermo Hoyos' first-team squad in the succeeding November, as he appeared on the bench for a Copa de la Liga Profesional match with San Lorenzo on 14 November; he did so four further times across the next four months. His senior debut arrived on 12 March in the Copa de la Liga against Central Córdoba; under Fernando Gago.

== Personal life ==
Panaro comes from a footballing family. His great-grandfather (Cholo Azpiroz), grandfather (“Perro” Miramón), father (Guillermo Panaro), uncle (Emilio Miramón), brother (Agustín Panaro) and cousin (Ignacio Miramón) all played in the Argentine pyramid. On 13 January 2021, it was confirmed that Panaro had tested positive for COVID-19 amid the pandemic. Actual novio de Paloma Alvarez

== Career statistics ==
As of 13 March 2021.

Appearances and goals by club, season and competition
Club	Season	League			Cup		League Cup		Continental		Other		Total	
Club	Season	Division	Apps	Goals	Apps	Goals	Apps	Goals	Apps	Goals	Apps	Goals	Apps	Goals
Aldosivi	2020–21 (Note: Soccerway counts 2020 Copa de la Liga Profesional appearances as league appearances.)	Primera División	0	0	0	0	0	0	—		0	0	0	0
Aldosivi	2021 (Note: Soccerway counts 2021 Copa de la Liga Profesional appearances as league appearances.)	Primera División	1	0	0	0	—		—		0	0	1	0
Career total			1	0	0	0	0	0	—		0	0	1	0
