= Martín Fernández (footballer, born 2001) =

Uruguayan footballer (born 2001)

Personal information
- Full name: Martín Alejandro Fernández Figueira
- Date of birth: 8 May 2001 (age 25)
- Place of birth: Montevideo, Uruguay
- Height: 1.84 m (6 ft 0 in)
- Position: Midfielder

Team information
- Current team: Atlante (on loan from Newell's Old Boys)
- Number: 25

Youth career
- Liverpool Montevideo

Senior career*
Years	Team	Apps	(Gls)
2019–2023	Liverpool Montevideo	56	(1)
2022–2023	→ Boston River (loan)	38	(1)
2024–2025	Boston River	16	(0)
2024–2025	→ Gimnasia La Plata (loan)	26	(0)
2025–	Newell's Old Boys	7	(0)
2026	→ Albacete (loan)	14	(0)
2026–	→ Atlante (loan)	2	(0)
- * Club domestic league appearances and goals as of 25 July 2026

Martín Alejandro Fernández Figueira (born 8 May 2001) is a Uruguayan professional footballer who plays as a midfielder for Liga MX club Atlante, on loan from AFA Liga Profesional de Fútbol club Newell's Old Boys.

== Club career ==
A youth academy graduate of Liverpool Montevideo, Fernández made his professional debut on 4 May 2019 in a 4–0 league win against Boston River.

On 2 February 2026, Fernández joined Spanish Segunda División side Albacete Balompié on a six-month loan deal from Newell's Old Boys.

== International career ==
Fernández is a former Uruguayan youth international.

== Career statistics ==
As of 9 October 2022

Club	Season	League			Cup		Continental		Other		Total	
Club	Season	Division	Apps	Goals	Apps	Goals	Apps	Goals	Apps	Goals	Apps	Goals
Liverpool Montevideo	2019	Uruguayan Primera División	10	0	—		0	0	—		10	0
Liverpool Montevideo	2020	Uruguayan Primera División	28	1	—		4 (Note: Appearances in Copa Sudamericana.)	0	0	0	32	1
Liverpool Montevideo	2021	Uruguayan Primera División	15	0	—		2 (Note: Appearances in Copa Libertadores.)	0	—		17	0
Liverpool Montevideo	Total		53	1	0	0	6	0	0	0	59	1
Boston River (loan)	2022	Uruguayan Primera División	13	0	1	0	—		—		14	0
Career total			66	1	1	0	6	0	0	0	73	1
