= Ariel Broggi =

Argentine former footballer

Personal information
- Full name: Ariel Esteban Broggi
- Date of birth: 15 January 1983 (age 43)
- Place of birth: San Martín, Argentina
- Height: 1.72 m (5 ft 8 in)
- Position: Left-back

Senior career*
| Years | Team | Apps | (Gls) |
| 2003–2007 | Vélez Sársfield | 101 | (1) |
| 2007–2013 | Banfield | 71 | (0) |
| 2009–2010 | → Ankaragücü (loan) | 19 | (0) |
| 2010–2011 | → Quilmes (loan) | 17 | (0) |

Managerial career
- 2018–2019: Racing Club (assistant)
- 2020: Internacional (assistant)
- 2020–2022: Celta (assistant)
- 2023: Atlético Mineiro (assistant)
- 2025: Banfield
- 2025–2026: Gimnasia (M)
- 2026–: River Plate (assistant)
- * Club domestic league appearances and goals

Ariel Esteban Broggi (born 15 January 1983) is an Argentine football coach and former professional player who played as a Left-back. He is currently part of Eduardo Coudet's coaching staff at River Plate.

Broggi played mainly as a left-back, appearing for Vélez Sársfield, Banfield, Ankaragücü and Quilmes.

== Career ==
Born in San Martín, Buenos Aires Province, Broggi started his career in 2003 at Vélez Sársfield where he played 100 games, scoring one goal. At the end of 2005 Clausura Tournament Broggi played most of the games in Vélez' championship winning campaign. However, he lost his place to Marcelo Bustamante at the end of the tournament. In 2007, he was transferred to Banfield.

On 31 August 2009 Broggi transferred on loan to Ankaragücü on a one-year contract. For the 2010–11 season, he returned to Argentina to play on loan with Quilmes.

== Managerial statistics ==
As of 10 August 2025

Managerial record by team and tenure
| Team | Nat | From | To | Record | | | | | | | |
| Team | Nat | From | To | G | W | D | L | GF | GA | GD | Win % |
|---|---|---|---|---|---|---|---|---|---|---|---|
| Banfield | (Argentina) | 11 December 2024 | 26 April 2025 | 16 | 3 | 5 | 8 | 12 | 18 | −6 | 18.75 |
| Gimnasia (M) | (Argentina) | 24 July 2025 | present | 3 | 3 | 0 | 0 | 5 | 0 | +5 | 100.00 |
| Total | | | | 19 | 6 | 5 | 8 | 17 | 18 | −1 | 31.58 |

== Honours ==
=== Player ===
Vélez Sársfield

- Argentine Primera División: 2005 Clausura

Banfield

- Argentine Primera División: 2009 Apertura

=== Manager ===
Gimnasia y Esgrima de Mendoza

- Primera Nacional: 2025
