= Lucas Román =

Italian-Argentinian footballer (born 2004)

Personal information
- Full name: Lucas Ayrton Román
- Date of birth: 10 February 2004 (age 22)
- Place of birth: Buenos Aires, Argentina
- Height: 1.59 m (5 ft 3 in)
- Position: Forward

Team information
- Current team: Dordrecht
- Number: 16

Youth career
- 2011–2022: Ferro Carril Oeste

Senior career*
Years	Team	Apps	(Gls)
2021–2023	Ferro Carril Oeste	27	(3)
2023–2025	Barcelona B	25	(1)
2024–2025	→ Cartagena (loan)	19	(2)
2025–2026	Independiente	1	(0)
2025–2026	→ Atlético Tucumán (loan)	1	(0)
2026–	Dordrecht	6	(0)

International career^{‡}
2022	Argentina U20	1	(0)
2023	Italy U20	1	(0)
- * Club domestic league appearances and goals as of 3 October 2026 ‡ National team caps and goals as of 02:09, 31 March 2023 (UTC)

Lucas Ayrton "Pocho" Román (born 10 February 2004) is a professional footballer who plays as a forward for Eerste Divisie club Dordrecht in the Netherlands. Born in Argentina, he has represented both Argentina and Italy in their youth teams.

== Club career ==
A youth product of Ferro Carril Oeste since the age of 6, Román signed his first professional contract with the side on 23 July 2020 until 2022. He made his professional debut with the club in a Primera Nacional match against Quilmes on 28 February 2022. He extended his contract with the club on 3 June 2022, until December 2023.

=== Barcelona ===
On 18 January 2023, Barcelona Atlètic announced an agreement with Ferro Carril Oeste to sign Román on a permanent deal, as the player signed a contract up to 30 June 2026, including a 400 million euro release clause.

In August 2024, Román joined Segunda División club FC Cartagena on a season-long loan deal.

=== Independiente ===
After his loan at Cartagena was mutually terminated, it was announced on 31 January 2025 that Román joined Argentine Primera División side Independiente permanently, signing a three-year contract.

On 22 July 2025, Román joined Atlético Tucumán on loan until the end of 2026.

=== Dordrecht ===
On 13 August 2026, Román signed a one-season contract with Dutch club Dordrecht.

== International career ==
Román has represented Argentina at under-13, under-15, under-17 and under-20 level.

With the latter youth national team, under head coach Javier Mascherano, the forward won the 2022 L'Alcúdia International Football Tournament, and was included in the preliminary squad for the 2023 South American U-20 Championship.

In August 2023, in virtue of his Italian passport, Román received his first call-up to the Italy under-20 national team.

== Playing style ==
Román is a left-footed forward who can also act as a winger. He is described as a mobile and creative forward who can start plays in the midfield or on the wing. He has a good shot from distance, and is known for his winning mentality.

== Personal life ==
Born in Argentina, Román also holds an Italian passport.

== Career statistics ==
=== Club ===
As of matches played 23 June 2024

Appearances and goals by club, season and competition
Club	Season	League			Cup		Other		Total	
Club	Season	Division	Apps	Goals	Apps	Goals	Apps	Goals	Apps	Goals
Ferro Carril Oeste	2022	Primera Nacional	27	3	0	0	0	0	27	3
Barcelona B	2022–23	Primera Federación	11	1	–		0	0	11	1
Barcelona B	2023–24	Primera Federación	14	0	–		3 (Note: Appearances in 2024 Primera Federación play-offs)	1	17	1
Barcelona B	Total		25	1	0	0	3	1	28	2
Career total			52	4	0	0	3	1	55	5
