= Franco Torres =

Argentine footballer

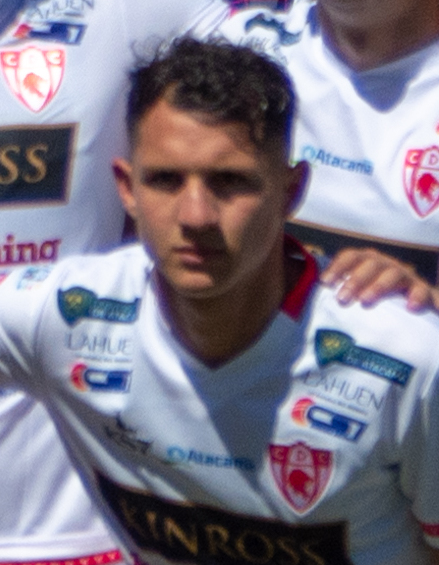

Personal information
- Full name: Franco Ramón Torres
- Date of birth: 25 May 1999 (age 27)
- Place of birth: San Luis del Palmar, Argentina
- Height: 1.72 m (5 ft 8 in)
- Position: Forward

Team information
- Current team: Gimnasia La Plata
- Number: 26

Youth career
- 2014–2019: Banfield
- 2019–2021: Gimnasia La Plata

Senior career*
Years	Team	Apps	(Gls)
2021–	Gimnasia La Plata	45	(5)
2022	→ Guillermo Brown (loan)	16	(1)
2024	→ Deportes Copiapó (loan)	23	(4)
- * Club domestic league appearances and goals as of 17:25, 9 July 2026 (UTC)

Franco Ramón Torres (born 25 May 1999) is an Argentine footballer who plays as a forward for Gimnasia La Plata.

== Club career ==
Born in San Luis del Palmar, Corrientes, Argentina, Torres was with Banfield for five years before joining Gimnasia y Esgrima de La Plata in 2019. He signed his first professional contract at the beginning of 2021 and made his debut in the Argentine Primera División match against Platense on 17 July of the same year.

In 2022, he was loaned out to Guillermo Brown in the Primera Nacional.

In 2024, he moved to Chile and joined Deportes Copiapó in the top division on a one-year loan with an option to buy.

== Career statistics ==
As of 10 August 2024.

Appearances and goals by club, season and competition
Club	Division	League			Cup		Continental		Total	
Club	Division	Season	Apps	Goals	Apps	Goals	Apps	Goals	Apps	Goals
Gimnasia La Plata	Argentine Primera División	2021	8	0	0	0	—		8	0
Gimnasia La Plata	Argentine Primera División	2023	10	1	0	0	4	1	14	2
Gimnasia La Plata	Total		18	1	0	0	4	1	22	2
Guillermo Brown	Primera B Nacional	2022	16	1	—		—		16	1
Deportes Copiapó	Chilean Primera División	2024	16	2	2	0	—		18	2
Career total			50	4	2	0	4	1	56	5
