= Alejandro Orfila (footballer) =

Uruguayan footballer and manager

Personal information
- Full name: Alejandro Miguel Orfila Colmenares
- Date of birth: 18 May 1976 (age 50)
- Place of birth: Montevideo, Uruguay
- Height: 1.80 m (5 ft 11 in)
- Position: Midfielder

Youth career
- Defensor Sporting

Senior career*
Years	Team	Apps	(Gls)
1997–1999	Miramar Misiones		
1999	Cerrito	22	(0)
1999–2003	Tigre	81	(2)
2003	Sportivo Italiano		
2003–2004	Temperley		
2004–2005	Sportivo Italiano		
2005–2007	Almirante Brown	67	(1)
2007–2008	Tristán Suárez	57	(1)
2009	Temperley		
2009	Deportivo Morón	10	(0)
2010	Villa San Carlos	18	(0)
2010–2012	Barracas Central	66	(1)
2012–2013	Colegiales	30	(1)
2013–2014	Talleres (RE)	34	(0)
2014	San Telmo	20	(0)
2015	Sacachispas	13	(0)
2015	San Miguel	16	(0)

Managerial career
- 2017: Comunicaciones
- 2017–2019: Ferro Carril Oeste
- 2019: Atlanta
- 2020: Defensor Sporting
- 2021: Belgrano
- 2022: Deportivo Morón
- 2022: Atlanta
- 2022–2023: Almirante Brown
- 2023: Temperley
- 2024: Barracas Central
- 2025: Gimnasia La Plata
- 2026: Cusco
- * Club domestic league appearances and goals

Alejandro Miguel Orfila Colmenares (born 18 May 1976) is a Uruguayan football manager and former player who played as a midfielder.

== Playing career ==
Orfila was born in Montevideo, and began his career with the youth sides of Defensor Sporting. After finishing his formation, he moved to Segunda División side Miramar Misiones, where he spent two years before having a brief spell at Cerrito.

In 1999, Orfila moved abroad and joined Argentine Primera B Nacional side Tigre. In 2003, after suffering relegation to the Primera B Metropolitana, he signed for fellow third division side Sportivo Italiano.

Orfila would play his career in the Argentine third division in the following ten years (aside from a short period winning the Primera C Metropolitana with Barracas Central in 2010), representing Temperley (two spells), Italiano, Almirante Brown, Tristán Suárez, Deportivo Morón, Villa San Carlos and Colegiales. He would appear in the fourth tier in the last two seasons of his career, playing for Talleres de Remedios de Escalada, San Telmo, Sacachispas and San Miguel.

== Managerial career ==
Shortly after retiring, Orfila worked as a coach of the Unionized Argentine Footballers in 2016 before being appointed manager of Comunicaciones on 5 January 2017, replacing Jorge Vivaldo. He led the club to the finals of the promotion play-offs in his first season, losing to Deportivo Riestra.

On 11 December 2017, Orfila left Comunicaciones to take over second division side Ferro Carril Oeste. He left on a mutual agreement on 9 February 2019, and was named Atlanta manager on 11 March.

Orfila left Atlanta in December 2019, and returned to his first club Defensor, now as manager. He was sacked on 12 November 2020, and returned to Argentina the following 7 February, after being presented at Belgrano.

Dismissed by Belgrano on 8 May 2021, and was announced as manager of Chilean side San Luis de Quillota nine days later. However, he did not take over the latter club, and was appointed manager of Morón on 6 December.

Orfila was relieved from his duties on 16 April 2022, and returned to Atlanta on 2 May. He only lasted six matches at the club, being sacked on 15 June.

On 25 October 2022, Orfila was appointed manager of another club he represented as a player, Almirante Brown. Dismissed the following 11 June, he was announced as manager of Temperley late in the month.

Orfila departed Temperley on 4 December 2023, and was appointed manager of Barracas Central in the Primera División nine days later.

Orfila resigned from Barracas on 27 August 2024, and took over fellow league team Gimnasia La Plata on 28 May 2025. Sacked on 13 October, he moved to Peru after being named Cusco FC manager on 30 March 2026, but was also dismissed on 9 June.

== Honours ==
Barracas Central

- Primera C Metropolitana: 2009–10
