= Diego Flores (footballer) =

Argentine footballer and manager

Personal information
- Full name: Rodolfo Diego Flores
- Date of birth: 11 December 1980 (age 45)
- Place of birth: Córdoba, Argentina
- Position: Midfielder

Team information
- Current team: Instituto (manager)

Senior career*
Years	Team	Apps	(Gls)
- Las Flores
2000–2006	Sportivo Belgrano Almafuerte		
- Progreso de Noetinger
2009	Sportivo Belgrano Almafuerte		
2013	Kingswood Castle		

Managerial career
- General Paz Juniors (youth)
- Taborín (youth)
- 2012: Sportivo Belgrano Almafuerte
- 2013: Kingswood Castle (youth)
- 2014–2015: Marseille (assistant)
- 2016: Lazio (assistant)
- 2017: Lille (assistant)
- 2018–2021: Leeds United (assistant)
- 2021–2022: Godoy Cruz
- 2023: Godoy Cruz
- 2024: San Martín de Tucumán
- 2025: Gimnasia La Plata
- 2025: Maccabi Haifa
- 2026–: Instituto
- * Club domestic league appearances and goals

Rodolfo Diego Flores (born 11 December 1980) is an Argentine football manager, and former player who played mainly as a midfielder. He is the current manager of Instituto.

== Career ==
Born in Córdoba, Flores only played amateur football before deciding he would become a coach at the age of 24. He began his managerial career with General Paz Juniors, later working at Taborín's youth categories and Sportivo Belgrano de Almafuerte before moving to Ireland in 2013 to study for UEFA qualifications.

While in Ireland, Flores worked as a barista in a coffeehouse and played for Dublin-based side Kingswood Castle; at the club, he also helped managing the youth teams. After leaving Ireland at the end of 2013, he moved to Southampton where he met Mauricio Pochettino, and later Marcelo Bielsa; after a chat with Diego Reyes, a member of Bielsa's staff, he was invited by Bielsa to join his coaching staff at Olympique de Marseille.

Flores worked under Bielsa for a total of seven years, at Lazio, Lille OSC and Leeds United. On 31 August 2021, he was appointed manager of Argentine Primera División side Godoy Cruz.

Flores' first professional match occurred on 5 September 2021, a 4–0 home routing of Gimnasia La Plata. The following April, he left the club on a mutual agreement.

On 3 November 2022, Flores returned to Godoy Cruz, after being appointed manager for the upcoming season, but again left the club the following 10 April, after being dismissed.

On 11 December 2023, Flores was named manager of San Martín de Tucumán. He led the club to the 2024 Primera Nacional final, losing to Aldosivi, but missed out promotion in the Torneo Reducido after being knocked out in the semifinals by Gimnasia y Esgrima de Mendoza; on 13 December 2024, he was sacked.

On 10 February 2025, Flores was named in charge of Gimnasia La Plata back in the top tier, but was dismissed on 11 May.

On 4 June 2025, Flores signed in Maccabi Haifa from Israeli Premier League for one year, but was sacked on 20 October 2025 after winning just 4 matches out of 11 in charge. On 12 February of the following year, he returned to the Argentine top tier after being named manager of Instituto.
