= Juan José Pérez =

Colombian footballer (born 2004)

Personal information
- Full name: Juan José Pérez Suaza
- Date of birth: 25 July 2004 (age 22)
- Place of birth: Quindío, Colombia
- Height: 1.69 m (5 ft 7 in)
- Positions: Midfielder; right winger

Team information
- Current team: Gimnasia LP
- Number: 20

Youth career
- Futbolcenter

Senior career*
Years	Team	Apps	(Gls)
2021–2023	América de Quito	37	(2)
2023	→ Emelec (loan)	5	(0)
2024	Deportivo Pereira	3	(0)
2024–2025	Godoy Cruz	13	(1)
2025–	Gimnasia LP	7	(0)

International career^{‡}
2022	Colombia U20	1	(0)
- * Club domestic league appearances and goals as of 17:21, 9 July 2026 (UTC) ‡ National team caps and goals as of 24 November 2022

Juan José Pérez Suaza (born 25 July 2004) is a Colombian footballer who plays as a midfielder or right-winger for Argentine club Gimnasia LP.

== Club career ==
Having emigrated to Ecuador from his native Colombia, Pérez' performances for América de Quito - with whom he made his debut in the Ecuadorian Serie B as a seventeen-year-old - drew the attention of Serie A side L.D.U. Quito. However, he would remain with América de Quito until February 2023, when he was loaned to Serie A side Emelec on an eighteen-month loan deal with a purchase option.

Neither Pérez nor Emelec had a good start to the 2023 season, with the club struggling for form and Pérez finding his opportunities limited. In May 2023, having only made three substitute appearances for the side, Pérez gave an interview with Ecuadorian media, attempting to rally the team and cheer up fans, stating: "keep a good attitude and keep your head held high". However, in July, having only made four more appearances for the club since speaking to the press, his agent, Chalo Vargas, stated in an interview with WQ Radio that Pérez had received an offer from an unnamed Spanish second division team. Later in the same month, he reached a mutual agreement with Emelec to have his contract terminated, and he returned to América de Quito.

== International career ==
Pérez was called up to the Colombia under-15 side for a micro-cycle in 2019.

== Career statistics ==
=== Club ===
As of 26 October 2023.

Appearances and goals by club, season and competition
Club	Season	League			Cup		Continental		Other		Total	
Club	Season	Division	Apps	Goals	Apps	Goals	Apps	Goals	Apps	Goals	Apps	Goals
América de Quito	2021	Ecuadorian Serie B	7	0	0	0	–		0	0	7	0
América de Quito	2022	Ecuadorian Serie B	19	2	0	0	–		0	0	19	2
América de Quito	2023	Ecuadorian Serie B	11	0	0	0	–		0	0	1	0
América de Quito	Total		37	2	0	0	0	0	0	0	37	2
Emelec (loan)	2023	Ecuadorian Serie A	5	0	0	0	2 (Note: Appearances in the Copa Sudamericana)	0	0	0	7	0
Career total			42	2	0	0	4	0	0	0	44	2
