= Club Atlético Aldosivi =

Association football club in Argentina

Aldosivi
- Full name: Club Atlético Aldosivi
- Nicknames: Tiburón (Shark); El Verde (The Green); El equipo de la Ciudad (The City team); El más grande de la Costa Atlantica (The greatest on the Atlantic Coast)
- Founded: 29 March 1913; 113 years ago
- Ground: Estadio José María Minella
- Capacity: 35,354
- Chairman: Hernán Tillous
- Manager: Israel Damonte
- League: Primera División
- 2025: 13th. of Zona A
- Website: aldosivi.com
Home colours	Away colours	Third colours

Club Atlético Aldosivi (usually called simply Aldosivi) is an Argentine football club based in the city of Mar del Plata, Buenos Aires Province. The senior squad plays since 2025 in the Primera División, the first division of the Argentine football league system.

The club also has a women's football section.

== History ==
=== Foundation ===
The club was founded on March 29, 1913, when a group of employees of the French company that was building the port of Mar del Plata by then, met at El Recreo coffee house to establish a club where they could play the sport they loved.

The club's name comes from the first two letters of the last name of engineers and owners of the company commissioned to build the port: Allard, Doulfus, Sillard, and Wiriott (the "w" was changed to a "v" because there was no "W" available to telegraph the official announcement).

The first colors were taken from the French flag (blue, white and red), worn by the team during its first years of existence. Some time later, a local store donated the green and yellow jerseys in vertical stripes to the club. It became Aldosivi definitive colors, worn to present days.

Pedro Seré was elected as club's first president. He also established the "Asociación Marplatense de Football" (the first local league), headquartered at the port of Mar del Plata on Figuero Alcorta street.

=== First success ===
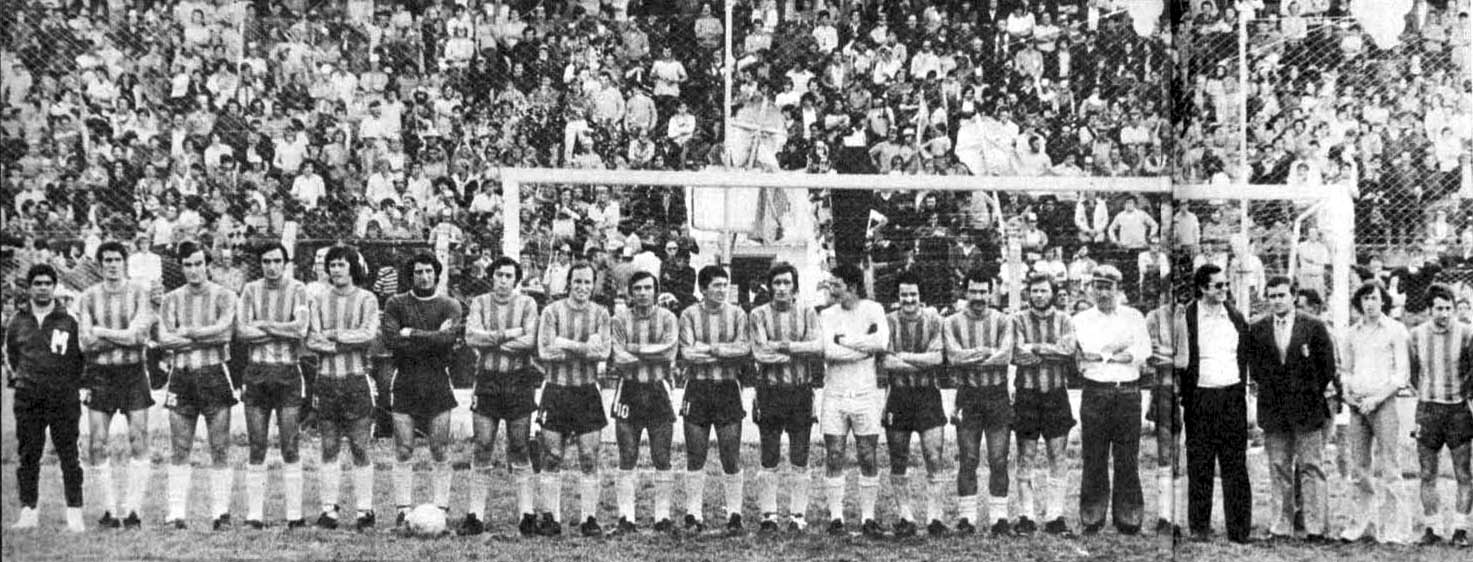
Players of Aldosivi that won the Liga Marplatense championship to play their first Torneo Nacional

With football as the main activity of the institution, the first notable achievement was the promotion to the first division of MDP in 1959. The Ministry of Public Works Stadium was Aldosivi's venue by then.

In 1973, Aldosivi played its first National Championship. The club returned to the top division competitions in 1975, achieving a well remembered win over Boca Juniors 2–1 at La Bombonera.

Apart from football, the club hosted other sports activities such as basketball, boxing and bowling, among others. These sections are no longer active.

In 1979, Aldosivi merged with two other clubs from Mar del Plata, Talleres and Banfield, and was known by the name Defensores del Puerto until 1981 when it returned to the traditional name, which it still uses today.

== Players ==
=== Current squad ===
As of 23 September 2026

Note: Flags indicate national team as defined under FIFA eligibility rules; some limited exceptions apply. Players may hold more than one non-FIFA nationality.

No.	Pos.	Nation	Player
2	DF	ARG	Leonardo Sigali
4	DF	ARG	Rodrigo González
5	MF	ARG	Nicolás Linares
7	FW	ARG	Natanael Guzmán (on loan from Plaza Colonia)
8	MF	ARG	Martín García
9	FW	ARG	Nicolás Cordero
10	MF	ARG	Nico Gaitán
11	FW	ARG	Agustín Palavecino (on loan from Estudiantes)
13	DF	ARG	Braian Cufré
14	DF	ARG	Elías López
15	MF	ARG	Francisco Perruzzi
16	FW	ARG	Bautista Dadín (on loan from River Plate)
17	DF	ARG	Federico Laurelli

No.	Pos.	Nation	Player
18	FW	ARG	Andrés Chávez
19	MF	ARG	Lucas Castro (captain)
21	FW	ARG	Matías Godoy (on loan from Estudiantes)
22	MF	ARG	Alan Sosa (on loan from Gimnasia LP)
23	GK	ARG	Ignacio Chicco
25	DF	ARG	Néstor Breitenbruch
27	FW	ARG	Tomás Fernández
28	DF	ARG	Santiago Moya (on loan from Huracán)
29	FW	SLO	Andrés Vombergar
32	DF	ARG	Joaquín Pombo
33	DF	ARG	Nicolás Zalazar
42	GK	ARG	Lucas Acosta

=== Reserve squad ===
Note: Flags indicate national team as defined under FIFA eligibility rules; some limited exceptions apply. Players may hold more than one non-FIFA nationality.

No.	Pos.	Nation	Player
24	FW	ARG	Felipe Anso
31	FW	ARG	Augusto Fernández
38	MF	ARG	Segundo Fernández

No.	Pos.	Nation	Player
40	MF	ARG	Joaquín Salinas
41	GK	PAR	Kevin Báez

==== Out on loan ====
Note: Flags indicate national team as defined under FIFA eligibility rules; some limited exceptions apply. Players may hold more than one non-FIFA nationality.

No.	Pos.	Nation	Player
14	MF	ARG	Elías Brítez (to San Telmo until 31 December 2026)

== Managers ==
- (Argentina) Andrés Rebottaro (2004–05; 2007–09)
- (Argentina) Julio Toresani (2007)
- (Argentina) Salvador Daniele (2010–11)
- (Argentina) Fernando Quiroz (2011–13; 2014–16)
- (Argentina) Sebastián Rambert (2013)
- (Argentina) Darío Franco (2013–14; 2016)
- (Argentina) Guillermo Hoyos (2019–21)
- (Argentina) Fernando Gago (2021)
- (Argentina) Martín Palermo (2021–22)
- (Argentina) Leandro Somoza (2022)
- (Argentina) Diego Villar (2022)
- (Argentina) Fernando Quiroz (2023)
- (Argentina) Walter Coyette (2023)
- (Argentina) Andrés Yllana (2023–25)
- (Argentina) Mariano Charlier (2025)
- (Argentina) Guillermo Farré (2025–)

== Titles ==
=== National ===
- Primera B Nacional (2): 2017–18, 2024

=== Regional ===
- Liga Marplatense de Fútbol
  - First Division (6): 1973, 1974, 1975, 1989, 1993, 1994
  - Second Division (3): 1923, 1959, 1983
  - Third Division (2): 1941, 1944
