= 2025 Argentinos Juniors season =

Argentinos Juniors
2025 season
- Chairman: Cristian Malaspina
- Manager: Nicolás Diez
- Stadium: Estadio Diego Armando Maradona
- Torneo Apertura: Quarter-finals
- Torneo Clausura: Quarter-finals
- Copa Argentina: Runners-up
Home colours	Away colours

The 2025 season was the 121st since the foundation of Asociación Atlética Argentinos Juniors and their 9th consecutive season in the Primera División. The club also competed in the Copa Argentina.

== Squad ==
=== Players ===
As of 22 January, 2025.

Note: Flags indicate national team as defined under FIFA eligibility rules; some limited exceptions apply. Players may hold more than one non-FIFA nationality.

No.	Pos.	Nation	Player
2	DF	ARG	Tobías Ramírez
3	DF	ARG	Luciano Sánchez
4	DF	ARG	Érik Godoy
5	MF	PAR	Juan Cardozo
6	DF	ARG	Román Vega
7	FW	ARG	Santiago Rodríguez
8	MF	URU	Alan Rodríguez (captain)
9	FW	ARG	Maximiliano Romero
10	MF	ARG	Alan Lescano
11	FW	ARG	José María Herrera
12	GK	ARG	Gonzalo Siri
13	FW	URU	Joaquín Ardaiz
14	DF	ARG	Kevin Coronel
15	MF	PAR	Ariel Gamarra
16	DF	ARG	Francisco Álvarez
17	MF	ARG	Cristian Ferreira

No.	Pos.	Nation	Player
18	FW	ARG	Ismael Sosa
19	FW	URU	Rubén Bentancourt
20	DF	ARG	Sebastián Prieto
21	MF	ARG	Nicolás Oroz
22	DF	URU	Leandro Lozano
23	DF	ARG	Thiago Santamaría
24	MF	ARG	Federico Fattori
25	MF	ARG	Lucas Gómez
27	FW	ARG	Tomás Molina
29	FW	ARG	Emiliano Viveros
30	FW	ARG	Manuel Brondo
33	DF	URU	Mateo Antoni
50	GK	ARG	Diego Rodríguez (vice captain)

=== Transfers In ===
Pos.	Player	Transferred from	Fee	Date	Source
DF	(Uruguay) Mateo Antoni	(Uruguay) Nacional	€2,100,000	3 January 2025	
MF	(Argentina) Federico Fattori	(Argentina) Huracán	€1,100,000	6 January 2025	
FW	(Uruguay) Rubén Bentancourt	(Uruguay) Nacional	Free	8 January 2025	
MF	(Argentina) Ismael Sosa	(Chile) Ñublense	Free	14 January 2025	
DF	(Uruguay) Leandro Lozano	(Uruguay) Nacional	Undisclosed	14 January 2025	
MF	(Argentina) Joaquín Gho	(Argentina) Sarmiento	Undisclosed	19 June 2025	
MF	(Argentina) Gabriel Florentín	(Russia) Orenburg	Free	29 June 2025	
DF	(Argentina) Claudio Bravo	(United States) Portland Timbers	Undisclosed	3 July 2025	
MF	(Argentina) Lautaro Giaccone	(Argentina) Rosario Central	$1,000,000	3 July 2025	
MF	(Argentina) Hernán López	(United States) San Jose Earthquakes	Loan	5 July 2025	

=== Transfers Out ===
Pos.	Player	Transferred to	Fee	Date	Source
MF	(Argentina) Francis Mac Allister	(Argentina) Instituto	Loan	2 January 2025	
DF	(Argentina) Lucas Villalba	(Brazil) Cruzeiro	€770,000	3 January 2025	
FW	(Argentina) Santiago Rodríguez	(Argentina) Sarmiento	Loan	20 June 2025	
MF	(Argentina) José María Herrera	(Brazil) Fortaleza	US$2,400,000	30 June 2025	
MF	(Argentina) Thiago Nuss	(Greece) OFI	€800,000	9 July 2025	
MF	(Argentina) Damián Batallini	(Bolivia) Bolívar	Loan	11 July 2025	
FW	(Argentina) Maximiliano Romero	(Chile) O'Higgins	Loan	25 July 2025	

== Exhibition matches ==
15 January 2025	Juventud de Las Piedras (Uruguay)	1–3	(Argentina) Argentinos Juniors

== Competitions ==
=== Overall record ===
Competition	First match	Last match	Starting round	Final position	Record							
Competition	First match	Last match	Starting round	Final position	Pld	W	D	L	GF	GA	GD	Win %
Torneo Apertura	26 January 2025	19 May 2025	Matchday 1	Quarter-finals	18	10	7	1	28	11	+17	55.56
Torneo Clausura	13 July 2025	30 November 2025	Matchday 1	Quarter-finals	18	8	3	7	20	14	+6	44.44
Copa Argentina	16 April 2025	5 November 2025	Round of 64	Runners-up	6	5	1	0	13	4	+9	83.33
Total					42	23	11	8	61	29	+32	54.76

Source: Competitions

=== Primera División ===
==== Torneo Apertura ====
===== League table =====
Pos	Team	Pld	W	D	L	GF	GA	GD	Pts	Qualification
1	Argentinos Juniors	16	9	6	1	24	9	+15	33	Advance to round of 16
2	Boca Juniors	16	10	3	3	24	11	+13	33	Advance to round of 16
3	Racing	16	9	1	6	26	16	+10	28	Advance to round of 16
4	Huracán	16	7	6	3	19	12	+7	27	Advance to round of 16
5	Tigre	16	8	3	5	18	12	+6	27	Advance to round of 16

Source: AFA

===== Results by round =====
Round	1
Ground	A
Result	
Position	

A = Away; H = Home; W = Win; D = Draw; L = Loss

===== Matches =====
Win Draw Loss Postponed

26 January 2025 1	Boca Juniors	0–0	Argentinos Juniors	Buenos Aires
19:00 UTC−3		Report		Stadium: La Bombonera; Referee: Pablo Dóvalo

30 January 2025 2	Argentinos Juniors	1–0	Tigre	Buenos Aires
21:30 UTC−3	Rodríguez 20'			Stadium: Estadio Diego Armando Maradona

3 February 2025 3	Argentinos Juniors	1–0	Platense	Buenos Aires
21:30 UTC−3	Érik Godoy 90+2'			Stadium: Estadio Diego Armando Maradona

7 February 2025 4	Unión	0–1	Argentinos Juniors	Santa Fe
22:15 UTC−3			Oroz 6'	Stadium: Estadio 15 de Abril

12 February 2025 5	Argentinos Juniors	1–1	Huracán	Buenos Aires
20:00 UTC−3	Herrera 9'		Ibáñez 57'	Stadium: Estadio Diego Armando Maradona

15 February 2025 6	Racing	2–3	Argentinos Juniors	Avellaneda
21:30 UTC−3	Lescano 22'; Molina 28'; Prieto 47'	Report	Barrios 82'; Di Cesare 88'	Stadium: El Cilindro

24 February 2025 7	Argentinos Juniors	0–0	Independiente Rivadavia	Buenos Aires
19:00 UTC−3				Stadium: Estadio Diego Armando Maradona

2 March 2025 8	Argentinos Juniors	2–0	Instituto	Buenos Aires
17:00 UTC−3	Rodríguez 55'; Molina 74'			Stadium: Estadio Diego Armando Maradona

7 March 2025 9	Banfield	1–2	Argentinos Juniors	Banfield
19:00 UTC−3	Rodríguez 8' (o.g.)		Molina 62'; Gómez 90+2'	Stadium: Estadio Florencio Sola

14 March 2025 10	Argentinos Juniors	0–2	Aldosivi	Buenos Aires
19:00 UTC−3			Giani 10'; Leiva 89'	Stadium: Estadio Diego Armando Maradona

29 March 2025 11	Central Córdoba	1–1	Argentinos Juniors	Santiago del Estero
18:30 UTC−3	Perelló 81'		Molina 69'	Stadium: Estadio Único Madre de Ciudades

6 April 2025 12	Argentinos Juniors	4–1	Defensa y Justicia	Buenos Aires
20:15 UTC−3	Viveros 6'; Lozano 13'; Molina 25'; Vega 32'		Osorio 53'	Stadium: Estadio Diego Armando Maradona

11 April 2025 13	Newell's Old Boys	0–0	Argentinos Juniors	Rosario
21:00 UTC−3				Stadium: Estadio Marcelo Bielsa

22 April 2025 14	Argentinos Juniors	3–0	Barracas Central	Buenos Aires
19:00 UTC−3	Molina 31'; Jappert 42' (o.g.); Herrera 47'	Report		Stadium: Estadio Diego Armando Maradona

26 April 2025 15	Belgrano	1–1	Argentinos Juniors	Córdoba
19:00 UTC−3	Fernández 21'	Report	Lescano 47'	Stadium: El Gigante de Alberdi

2 May 2025 16	Argentinos Juniors	4–0	Estudiantes	Buenos Aires
15:30 UTC−3	Molina 26', 27'; Lescano 60'; Herrera 65'	Report		Stadium: Estadio Diego Armando Maradona

===== Final stages =====
11 May 2025 Round of 16	Argentinos Juniors	3–1	Instituto	Buenos Aires
18:00 UTC−3	Molina 60'; Herrera 63'; Sosa 88'	Report	Requena 70'	Stadium: Diego Armando Maradona; Referee: Andrés Gariano

19 May 2025 Quarter-finals	Argentinos Juniors	1–1 (7–8 p)	San Lorenzo	Buenos Aires
19:00 UTC−3	Molina 90+5'	Report	Vombergar 69'	Stadium: Diego Armando Maradona; Referee: Facundo Tello
	Penalties
	Lozano (penalty scored); Sosa (penalty scored); Prieto (penalty scored); Ardaiz (penalty scored); D. Rodríguez (penalty scored); Molina (penalty scored); Lescano (penalty scored); Romero (penalty missed)		(penalty scored) Vombergar; (penalty scored) Cuello; (penalty scored) Báez; (penalty scored) Herrera; (penalty scored) Domínguez; (penalty scored) Tripichio; (penalty scored) Reali; (penalty scored) Hernández

==== Torneo Clausura ====
===== League table =====
Pos	Team	Pld	W	D	L	GF	GA	GD	Pts	Qualification
3	Racing	16	7	4	5	16	13	+3	25	Advance to round of 16
4	Central Córdoba (SdE)	16	5	9	2	17	11	+6	24	Advance to round of 16
5	Argentinos Juniors	16	7	3	6	18	13	+5	24	Advance to round of 16
6	Barracas Central	16	5	8	3	19	17	+2	23	Advance to round of 16
7	Tigre	16	5	7	4	14	13	+1	22	Advance to round of 16

Source: AFA

===== Matches =====
13 July 2025 1	Argentinos Juniors	0–0	Boca Juniors	Buenos Aires
--:-- UTC−3				Stadium: Diego Armando Maradona

20 July 2025 2	Tigre	2–1	Argentinos Juniors	Victoria
21:00 UTC−3	Saralegui 52'; Russo 90'	Report	Prieto 56'	Stadium: Estadio José Dellagiovanna

26 July 2025 3	Platense	0–0	Argentinos Juniors	Florida
19:00 UTC−3		Report		Stadium: Estadio Ciudad de Vicente López

10 August 2025 4	Argentinos Juniors	1–0	Unión	Buenos Aires
20:00 UTC−3	Lescano 44'	Report		Stadium: Diego Armando Maradona

16 August 2025 5	Huracán	1–0	Argentinos Juniors	Buenos Aires
16:15 UTC−3	Urzi 87'	Report		Stadium: Estadio Tomás Adolfo Ducó

24 August 2025 6	Argentinos Juniors	4–1	Racing	Buenos Aires
16:15 UTC−3	Lescano 28'; López 51'; Giménez 60'; Oroz 70'	Report	Conechny 26'	Stadium: Diego Armando Maradona

30 August 2025 7	Independiente Rivadavia	2–1	Argentinos Juniors	Mendoza
17:00 UTC−3	Sartori 5'; Fernández 17'	Report	López 10'	Stadium: Estadio Bautista Gargantini

14 September 2025 8	Instituto	2–0	Argentinos Juniors	Córdoba
15:00 UTC−3		Report	Luna 45' (pen.); Lodico 90+1' (pen.)	Stadium: Estadio Monumental Presidente Perón

21 September 2025 9	Argentinos Juniors	3–0	Banfield	Buenos Aires
19:00 UTC−3	Molina 51' (pen.), 74'; Lescano 80'	Report		Stadium: Diego Armando Maradona

27 September 2025 10	Aldosivi	0–2	Argentinos Juniors	Mar del Plata
14:30 UTC−3		Report	Cerato 76' (o.g.); López 80'	Stadium: Estadio José María Minella

3 October 2025 11	Argentinos Juniors	0–0	Central Córdoba	Buenos Aires
21:15 UTC−3		Report		Stadium: Diego Armando Maradona

10 October 2025 12	Defensa y Justicia	1–0	Argentinos Juniors	Gobernador Costa
16:15 UTC−3	Gutiérrez 47'	Report		Stadium: Estadio Norberto "Tito" Tomaghello

17 October 2025 13	Argentinos Juniors	3–1	Newell's Old Boys	Buenos Aires
21:15 UTC−3	Porcel 21', 25'; Florentín 44'	Report	Herrera 9'	Stadium: Diego Armando Maradona

1 November 2025 14	Barracas Central	2–0	Argentinos Juniors	Buenos Aires
16:00 UTC−3	Bruera 4', 86'	Report		Stadium: Estadio Claudio Chiqui Tapia

10 November 2025 15	Argentinos Juniors	1–0	Belgrano	Buenos Aires
21:15 UTC−3	Giaccone 32'	Report		Stadium: Diego Armando Maradona

16 November 2025 16	Estudiantes	1–2	Argentinos Juniors	La Plata
20:15 UTC−3	Tobio Burgos 63'	Report	López 23'; Lescano 65'	Stadium: Estadio Jorge Luis Hirschi

===== Final stages =====
22 November 2025 Round of 16	Vélez Sarsfield	0–2	Argentinos Juniors	Buenos Aires
20:00		Report	López Muñoz 57', 61'	Stadium: José Amalfitani; Referee: Andrés Merlos

30 November 2025 Quarter-finals	Boca Juniors	1–0	Argentinos Juniors	Buenos Aires
18:30	Costa 4'	Report		Stadium: La Bombonera; Referee: Fernando Echenique

=== Copa Argentina ===
16 April 2025 Round of 64	Argentinos Juniors	3–0	Central Norte	Caseros
18:35	Rodríguez 38' (o.g.); Molina 48'; Herrera 67'	Report		Stadium: Ciudad de Caseros; Referee: Andrés Gariano

28 May 2025 Round of 32	Excursionistas	0–3	Argentinos Juniors	Buenos Aires
17:00		Report	Molina 47'; Sosa 53'; Lozano 58'	Stadium: Pedro Bidegain; Referee: Juan Pafundi

31 July 2025 Round of 16	Aldosivi	1–2	Argentinos Juniors	Florencio Varela
21:10	Cerato 45'	Report	Lescano 77'; Molina 84' (pen.)	Stadium: Norberto "Tito" Tomaghello; Referee: Fernando Espinoza

8 September 2025 Quarter-finals	Argentinos Juniors	1–0	Lanús	Avellaneda
21:10	Molina 35'	Report		Stadium: El Cilindro; Referee: Darío Herrera

23 October 2025 Semi-finals	Belgrano	1–2	Argentinos Juniors	Rosario
21:10	Zelarayán 35'	Report	López 58'; Molina 80' (pen.)	Stadium: Gigante de Arroyito; Referee: Yael Falcón Pérez

5 November 2025 Final	Independiente Rivadavia	2–2 (5–3 p)	Argentinos Juniors	Córdoba
21:10	Arce 8'; Fernández 62'	Report	Lescano 63'; Godoy 90+7'	Stadium: Estadio Monumental Presidente Perón; Referee: Nicolás Ramírez
	Penalties
	Gómez (penalty scored); Villalba (penalty scored); Retamar (penalty scored); Studer (penalty scored); Villa (penalty scored)		(penalty scored) Lescano; (penalty scored) López Muñoz; (penalty scored) Giaccone; (penalty missed) Molina
