= 2025 San Lorenzo de Almagro season =

San Lorenzo de Almagro
2025 season
- Manager: Miguel Ángel Russo (until 27 May); Damián Ayude (from 4 June)
- Stadium: Estadio Pedro Bidegain
- Torneo Apertura: Semi-finals
- Torneo Clausura: Round of 16
- Copa Argentina: Round of 16
- Average home league attendance: 46,349
Home colours	Away colours	Third colours

The 2025 season was the 117th for Club Atlético San Lorenzo de Almagro and their 11th consecutive season in the Primera División. The club also competed in the Copa Argentina.

== Squad ==
=== Current squad ===
As of 24 January, 2025

Note: Flags indicate national team as defined under FIFA eligibility rules; some limited exceptions apply. Players may hold more than one non-FIFA nationality.

No.	Pos.	Nation	Player
1	GK	ARG	Facundo Altamirano
4	DF	COL	Jhohan Romaña
5	MF	ARG	Elián Irala
7	FW	ARG	Ezequiel Cerutti
9	FW	SLO	Andrés Vombergar
11	FW	ARG	Matías Reali
12	GK	PAR	Orlando Gill
15	MF	ARG	Emanuel Cecchini
16	DF	ARG	Nery Domínguez
19	MF	ARG	Manuel Insaurralde
21	DF	ARG	Malcom Braida (captain)
23	MF	ARG	Francisco Peruzzi

No.	Pos.	Nation	Player
24	DF	ARG	Nicolás Tripichio
25	GK	ARG	José Devecchi
26	MF	ARG	Juán Cruz Vega
28	FW	ARG	Alexis Cuello
30	DF	ARG	Nahuel Arias
32	DF	ARG	Ezequiel Herrera
36	DF	ARG	Daniel Herrera
37	DF	ARG	Elías Báez
51	DF	ARG	Maximiliano Zelaya
80	MF	ESP	Iker Muniain
99	FW	COL	Jaime Peralta

=== Transfers In ===
Pos.	Player	Transferred to	Fee	Date	Source
GK	(Argentina) José Devecchi	(Argentina) Atlético Tucumán	Loan return	31 December 2024	
DF	(Argentina) Francisco Flores	(Argentina) Atlético Tucumán	Loan return	31 December 2024	
MF	(Argentina) Diego Calcaterra	(Argentina) Sarmiento	Loan return	31 December 2024	
DF	(Argentina) Tomás Ariel Silva	(Argentina) Atlanta	Loan return	31 December 2024	
MF	(Argentina) Alexis Sabella	(Argentina) Colón	Loan return	31 December 2024	
DF	(Argentina) Jeremías James	(Argentina) Deportivo Riestra	Loan return	31 December 2024	
MF	(Argentina) Julián Palacios	(Greece) Asteras Tripolis	Loan return	31 December 2024	
FW	(Argentina) Alexis Cuello	(Argentina) Almagro	Undisclosed	1 January 2025	
MF	(Argentina) Emanuel Cecchini	(Chile) Audax Italiano	Free	3 January 2025	
FW	(Argentina) Alexander Díaz	(Argentina) Deportivo Riestra	Loan return	21 January 2025	
DF	(Argentina) Nery Domínguez	(Argentina) Lanús	Free	24 January 2025	
MF	(Argentina) Francisco Perruzzi	(Greece) Panserraikos	Loan return	27 January 2025	
FW	(Colombia) Jaime Peralta	(Colombia) Cúcuta Deportivo	Loan	31 January 2025	
DF	(Argentina) Jeremías James	(Argentina) Alvarado	Loan return	31 May 2025	
MF	(Argentina) Alexis Sabella	(Argentina) Atlanta	Loan return	30 June 2025	

=== Transfers Out ===
Pos.	Player	Transferred to	Fee	Date	Source
FW	(Argentina) Francisco Fydriszewski	(Colombia) Independiente Medellín	Free	8 January 2025	
MF	(Argentina) Ignacio Vallejos	(Argentina) Colegiales	Loan	9 January 2025	
MF	(Spain) Iker Muniain		Contract terminated	21 June 2025	
MF	(Argentina) Elián Irala	(United Arab Emirates) Shabab Al-Ahli	US$2,800,000	9 July 2025	

== Exhibition matches ==
13 January 2025	Nacional (Uruguay)	0–1	(Argentina) San Lorenzo

16 January 2025	Peñarol (Uruguay)	0–1	(Argentina) San Lorenzo

19 January 2025	San Lorenzo (Argentina)	0–0 (5–4 p)	(Ecuador) Independiente del Valle

== Competitions ==
=== Overall record ===
Competition	First match	Last match	Starting round	Final position	Record							
Competition	First match	Last match	Starting round	Final position	Pld	W	D	L	GF	GA	GD	Win %
Torneo Apertura	25 January 2025	25 May 2025	Matchday 1	Semi-finals	19	8	7	4	17	13	+4	42.11
Torneo Clausura	11 July 2025	22 November 2025	Matchday 1	Round of 16	17	6	6	5	14	13	+1	35.29
Copa Argentina	23 March 2025	2 August 2025	Round of 64	Round of 16	3	0	2	1	0	1	−1	0.00
Total					39	14	15	10	31	27	+4	35.90

Source: Competitions

=== Primera División ===
==== Torneo Apertura ====
===== League table =====
Pos	Team	Pld	W	D	L	GF	GA	GD	Pts	Qualification
2	River Plate	16	8	7	1	21	9	+12	31	Advance to round of 16
3	Independiente	16	8	5	3	23	12	+11	29	Advance to round of 16
4	San Lorenzo	16	7	6	3	14	10	+4	27	Advance to round of 16
5	Deportivo Riestra	16	5	9	2	13	7	+6	24	Advance to round of 16
6	Platense	16	6	5	5	13	11	+2	23	Advance to round of 16

Source: AFA

===== Results by round =====
Round	1
Ground	H
Result	
Position	

A = Away; H = Home; W = Win; D = Draw; L = Loss

===== Matches =====
25 January 2025 1	San Lorenzo	1–0	Talleres	Buenos Aires
17:00 UTC−3	Vombergar 81'	Report		Stadium: Estadio Pedro Bidegain

29 January 2025 2	Gimnasia	0–2	San Lorenzo	La Plata
17:00 UTC−3		Report	Vombergar 74'; Cecchini 83'	Stadium: Estadio Juan Carmelo Zerillo

2 February 2025 3	San Lorenzo	0–0	River Plate	Buenos Aires
17:00 UTC−3		Report		Stadium: Estadio Pedro Bidegain; Referee: Darío Herrera

8 February 2025 4	Vélez Sarsfield	0–0	San Lorenzo	Buenos Aires
18:00 UTC−3		Report		Stadium: José Amalfitani Stadium

13 February 2025 5	San Lorenzo	2–1	Platense	Buenos Aires
20:00 UTC−3	Vombergar 44' (pen.), 90+1' (pen.)	Report	Taborda 31'	Stadium: Estadio Pedro Bidegain

17 February 2025 6	Instituto	0–1	San Lorenzo	Córdoba
21:30 UTC−3		Report	Vombergar 45+4' (pen.)	Stadium: Estadio Juan Domingo Perón

23 February 2025 7	Huracán	2–0	San Lorenzo	Buenos Aires
18:00 UTC−3	Pereyra 11'; Cabral 90'	Report		Stadium: Estadio Tomás Adolfo Ducó

3 March 2025 8	San Lorenzo	3–2	Racing	Buenos Aires
19:00 UTC−3	Braida 2', 86'; Peralta 90+1'	Report	Mura 30'; Balboa 50'	Stadium: Estadio Pedro Bidegain; Attendance: 46,792

8 March 2025 9	San Lorenzo	1–2	Independiente	Buenos Aires
17:00 UTC−3	Vombergar 22' (pen.)	Report	Millán 12'; Loyola 74'	Stadium: Estadio Pedro Bidegain

14 March 2025 10	Godoy Cruz	0–0	San Lorenzo	Mendoza
21:00 UTC−3		Report		Stadium: Estadio Malvinas Argentinas

28 March 2025 11	San Lorenzo	1–1	Lanús	Buenos Aires
19:15 UTC−3	Muniain 65'	Report	Moreno 82'	Stadium: Estadio Pedro Bidegain

4 April 2025 12	San Martín	0–1	San Lorenzo	San Juan
22:00 UTC−3		Report	Cerutti 69'	Stadium: Estadio Ingeniero Hilario Sánchez

12 April 2025 13	San Lorenzo	1–0	Atlético Tucumán	Buenos Aires
15:30 UTC−3	Vombergar 57'	Report		Stadium: Estadio Pedro Bidegain

20 April 2025 14	Deportivo Riestra	0–0	San Lorenzo	Buenos Aires
15:30 UTC−3		Report		Stadium: Estadio Guillermo Laza

26 April 2025 15	San Lorenzo	0–1	Rosario Central	Buenos Aires
17:00 UTC−3		Report	Copetti 90+1'	Stadium: Estadio Pedro Bidegain

3 May 2025 16	Sarmiento	1–1	San Lorenzo	Junín
16:00 UTC−3	Vombergar 36' (o.g.)	Report	Molina 87' (o.g.)	Stadium: Estadio Eva Perón

===== Final stages =====
10 May 2025 Round of 16	San Lorenzo	2–1	Tigre	Buenos Aires
14:00	Vombergar 3'; Cuello 88'	Report	Fértoli 48'	Stadium: Pedro Bidegain; Referee: Yael Falcón Pérez

19 May 2025 Quarter-finals	Argentinos Juniors	1–1 (7–8 p)	San Lorenzo	Buenos Aires
19:00	Molina 90+5'	Report	Vombergar 69'	Stadium: Diego Armando Maradona; Referee: Facundo Tello
	Penalties
	Lozano (penalty scored); Sosa (penalty scored); Prieto (penalty scored); Ardaiz (penalty scored); D. Rodríguez (penalty scored); Molina (penalty scored); Lescano (penalty scored); Romero (penalty missed)		(penalty scored) Vombergar; (penalty scored) Cuello; (penalty scored) Báez; (penalty scored) Herrera; (penalty scored) Domínguez; (penalty scored) Tripichio; (penalty scored) Reali; (penalty scored) Hernández

25 May 2025 Semi-finals	San Lorenzo	0–1	Platense	Buenos Aires
16:00		Report	Zapiola 71'	Stadium: Pedro Bidegain; Referee: Leandro Rey Hilfer

==== Torneo Clausura ====
===== League table =====
Pos	Team	Pld	W	D	L	GF	GA	GD	Pts	Qualification
3	Deportivo Riestra	16	8	4	4	19	12	+7	28	Advance to round of 16
4	Vélez Sarsfield	16	7	5	4	19	12	+7	26	Advance to round of 16
5	San Lorenzo	16	6	6	4	13	11	+2	24	Advance to round of 16
6	River Plate	16	6	4	6	20	15	+5	22	Advance to round of 16
7	Gimnasia y Esgrima (LP)	16	7	1	8	14	16	−2	22	Advance to round of 16

Source: AFA

===== Matches =====
11 July 2025 1	Talleres	1–2	San Lorenzo	Córdoba
20:00 UTC−3	Sequeira 45+2'	Report	Cuello 3'; Portilla 85' (o.g.)	Stadium: Estadio Mario Alberto Kempes

19 July 2025 2	San Lorenzo	0–0	Gimnasia	Buenos Aires
14:30 UTC−3		Report		Stadium: Estadio Pedro Bidegain

27 July 2025 3	River Plate	0–0	San Lorenzo	Buenos Aires
20:45 UTC−3		Report		Stadium: Estadio Monumental

7 August 2025 4	San Lorenzo	1–0	Vélez Sarsfield	Buenos Aires
19:00 UTC−3	Cuello 28'	Report		Stadium: Estadio Pedro Bidegain

16 August 2025 5	Platense	2–1	San Lorenzo	Florida
14:15 UTC−3	Martínez 5', 45+4'	Report	Báez 26'	Stadium: Estadio Ciudad de Vicente López

23 August 2025 6	San Lorenzo	1–0	Instituto	Buenos Aires
14:30 UTC−3	Salinardi 47'	Report		Stadium: Estadio Pedro Bidegain

30 August 2025 7	San Lorenzo	0–0	Huracán	Buenos Aires
14:45 UTC−3		Report		Stadium: Estadio Pedro Bidegain

12 September 2025 8	Racing	2–0	San Lorenzo	Avellaneda
19:00 UTC−3	Colombo 37'; Solari 58'	Report		Stadium: El Cilindro

21 September 2025 9	Independiente	1–1	San Lorenzo	Avellaneda
14:30 UTC−3	Tripichio 68' (o.g.)	Report	Gulli 37'	Stadium: Estadio Libertadores de América; Referee: Sebastían Zunino

27 September 2025 10	San Lorenzo	2–0	Godoy Cruz	Buenos Aires
16:45 UTC−3	Hernández 45'; Cuello 53' (pen.)	Report		Stadium: Estadio Pedro Bidegain

4 October 2025 11	Lanús	2–1	San Lorenzo	Lanús
21:15 UTC−3	Marcich 29'; Bou 53'	Report	Herazo 78'	Stadium: Estadio Ciudad de Lanús; Referee: Leandro Rey Hilfer

10 October 2025 12	San Lorenzo	0–1	San Martín	Buenos Aires
16:45 UTC−3		Report	González 77'	Stadium: Estadio Pedro Bidegain

20 October 2025 13	Atlético Tucumán	1–2	San Lorenzo	Tucumán
21:15 UTC−3	Ortiz 9'	Report	Cuello 45+7' (pen.); Tripichio 50'	Stadium: Estadio Monumental José Fierro

31 October 2025 14	San Lorenzo	1–0	Deportivo Riestra	Buenos Aires
19:00 UTC−3	Cuello 51'	Report		Stadium: Estadio Pedro Bidegain

7 November 2025 15	Rosario Central	0–0	San Lorenzo	Rosario
21:00 UTC−3		Report		Stadium: Estadio Gigante de Arroyito; Referee: Facundo Tello

15 November 2025 16	San Lorenzo	1–1	Sarmiento	Buenos Aires
19:30 UTC−3	Tripichio 2'	Report	Villalba 90+3'	Stadium: Estadio Pedro Bidegain

===== Final stages =====
22 November 2025 Round of 16	Central Córdoba	2–1	San Lorenzo	Santiago del Estero
22:00	Varaldo 66' (pen.); Florentín 90'	Report	Gulli 45'	Stadium: Estadio Único Madre de Ciudades; Referee: Nazareno Arasa

=== Copa Argentina ===
23 March 2025 Round of 64	San Lorenzo	0–0 (6–5 p)	Sportivo Las Parejas	San Nicolás de los Arroyos
19:15		Report		Stadium: Único de San Nicolás; Referee: Daniel Zamora
	Penalties
	Braida (penalty missed); Muniain (penalty scored); Reali (penalty scored); Cecchini (penalty missed); Vombergar (penalty scored); E. Herrera (penalty scored); Báez (penalty scored); Romaña (penalty scored)		(penalty scored) Britos; (penalty missed) Blanco; (penalty missed) Albertinazzi; (penalty scored) Fernández; (penalty scored) Aa. Martínez; (penalty scored) Arcando; (penalty scored) Yocco; (penalty missed) Herranz

5 July 2025 Round of 32	San Lorenzo	0–0 (4–3 p)	Quilmes	Lanús
16:45		Report		Stadium: Ciudad de Lanús – Néstor Díaz Pérez; Referee: Luis Lobo Medina
	Penalties
	Vombergar (penalty scored); Cuello (penalty scored); E. Herrera (penalty scored); Báez (penalty scored)		(penalty scored) Allende; (penalty scored) Belinetz; (penalty missed) Aranda; (penalty scored) Ramírez; (penalty missed) Flores

2 August 2025 Round of 16	San Lorenzo	0–1	Tigre	Morón
16:15		Report	Fértoli 25'	Stadium: Nuevo Francisco Urbano; Referee: Yael Falcón Pérez
