= 2024 San Lorenzo de Almagro season =

San Lorenzo de Almagro
2024 season
- Manager: Leandro Romagnoli (from 19 April)
- Stadium: Estadio Pedro Bidegain
- Primera División: 25th
- Copa Argentina: Round of 16
- Average home league attendance: 41,691

The 2024 season was the 116th in the history of San Lorenzo de Almagro and the club's 10th consecutive in the top flight. They will participate in the Primera División, Copa Argentina, Copa de la Liga Profesional, as well as the Copa Libertadores.

Competition began on 27 January and the season is scheduled to conclude on 15 December.

== Squad ==
As of 6 August 2024

Note: Flags indicate national team as defined under FIFA eligibility rules; some limited exceptions apply. Players may hold more than one non-FIFA nationality.

| No. | Pos. | Nation | Player |
|---|---|---|---|
| 4 | DF | COL | Jhohan Romaña |
| 5 | MF | ARG | Eric Remedi |
| 6 | MF | COL | Carlos Sánchez |
| 7 | FW | ARG | Ezequiel Cerutti |
| 8 | FW | ARG | Matías Reali |
| 9 | FW | SVN | Andrés Vombergar |
| 10 | FW | ARG | Nahuel Barrios |
| 11 | FW | PAR | Iván Leguizamón |
| 13 | GK | ARG | Facundo Altamirano (captain) |
| 16 | GK | ARG | Lautaro López Kaleniuk |
| 17 | MF | ARG | Elián Irala |
| 18 | MF | ARG | Cristian Ferreira (on loan from River Plate) |

| No. | Pos. | Nation | Player |
|---|---|---|---|
| 19 | MF | ARG | Manuel Insaurralde |
| 21 | MF | ARG | Malcom Braida |
| 22 | DF | ARG | Gastón Campi |
| 23 | DF | ARG | Gastón Hernández |
| 24 | DF | ARG | Nicolás Tripichio |
| 25 | GK | ARG | Gastón Gómez (on loan from Racing Club) |
| 28 | FW | ARG | Alexis Cuello (on loan from Club Almagro) |
| 29 | MF | ARG | Sebastián Blanco |
| 30 | DF | ARG | Nahuel Arias |
| 32 | FW | ARG | Facundo Bruera |
| 35 | DF | ARG | Gonzalo Luján |
| 77 | FW | ARG | Nahuel Bustos |

== Competitions ==
=== Overall record ===
| Competition | First match | Last match | Starting round | Final position | Record | | | | | | | |
| Competition | First match | Last match | Starting round | Final position | Pld | W | D | L | GF | GA | GD | Win % |
|---|---|---|---|---|---|---|---|---|---|---|---|---|
| Primera División | 12 May 2024 | 15 December 2024 | Matchday 1 | | 9 | 1 | 4 | 4 | 5 | 8 | −3 | 11.11 |
| Copa Argentina | 28 February 2024 | 6 August 2024 | Round of 64 | Round of 16 | 3 | 2 | 0 | 1 | 4 | 3 | +1 | 66.67 |
| Copa de la Liga Profesional | 27 January 2024 | | | | 0 | 0 | 0 | 0 | 0 | 0 | +0 | — |
| Copa Libertadores | | | | | 0 | 0 | 0 | 0 | 0 | 0 | +0 | — |
| Total | | | | | 12 | 3 | 4 | 5 | 9 | 11 | −2 | 25.00 |

Source: Competitions

=== Primera División ===
==== League table ====
| Pos | Team | Pld | W | D | L | GF | GA | GD | Pts |
|---|---|---|---|---|---|---|---|---|---|
| 22 | Central Córdoba (SdE) | 27 | 8 | 7 | 12 | 29 | 36 | −7 | 31 |
| 23 | Argentinos Juniors | 27 | 8 | 6 | 13 | 22 | 28 | −6 | 30 |
| 24 | San Lorenzo | 27 | 7 | 8 | 12 | 20 | 26 | −6 | 29 |
| 25 | Newell's Old Boys | 27 | 7 | 7 | 13 | 22 | 35 | −13 | 28 |
| 26 | Sarmiento (J) | 27 | 5 | 11 | 11 | 18 | 28 | −10 | 26 |

Source: AFA
Rules for classification: 1) points; 2) goal difference; 3) goals scored; 4) head-to-head results; 5) fair play ranking 6) drawing of lots.

==== Results summary ====
| Overall | | | | | | | | Home | | | | | | Away | | | | | |
| Pld | W | D | L | GF | GA | GD | Pts | W | D | L | GF | GA | GD | W | D | L | GF | GA | GD |
|---|---|---|---|---|---|---|---|---|---|---|---|---|---|---|---|---|---|---|---|
| 0 | 0 | 0 | 0 | 0 | 0 | 0 | 0 | 0 | 0 | 0 | 0 | 0 | 0 | 0 | 0 | 0 | 0 | 0 | 0 |

Last updated: 11 August 2024.

==== Results by round ====
| Round | 1 | 2 | 3 | 4 | 5 | 6 | 7 | 8 | 9 | 10 |
|---|---|---|---|---|---|---|---|---|---|---|
| Ground | A | H | A | H | A | H | A | H | A | H |
| Result | L | D | P | L | L | D | W | D | D | L |
| Position | 18 | 19 | 22 | 26 | 27 | 27 | 24 | 23 | 25 | 25 |

Updated to match(es) played on August 2024. Source: Worldfootball
A = Away; H = Home; W = Win; D = Draw; L = Loss

==== Matches ====
The dates for the first four rounds were announced on 6 May.

| 12 May 2024 1 | Deportivo Riestra | 1–0 | San Lorenzo |
| 15:30 UTC−3 |

| 20 May 2024 2 | San Lorenzo | 1–1 | CA Lanús |
| 19:00 UTC−3 |

| 25 May 2024 3 | Godoy Cruz | 1–1; Abandoned | San Lorenzo |
| 17:30 UTC−3 |

| 3 June 2024 4 | San Lorenzo | 0–1 | Sarmiento Junín |
| 17:00 UTC−3 |

| 15 June 2024 5 | Unión de Santa Fe | 2–1 | San Lorenzo |
| 16:00 UTC−3 |

| 20 July 2024 6 | San Lorenzo | 1–1 | CA Huracán |
| 17:00 UTC−3 |

| 23 July 2024 7 | Gimnasia La Plata | 0–1 | San Lorenzo |
| 18:45 UTC−3 |

| 27 July 2024 8 | San Lorenzo | 1–1 | Newell's Old Boys |
| 17:00 UTC−3 |

| 3 August 2024 9 | Independiente | 0–0 | San Lorenzo |
| 19:15 UTC−3 |

| 10 August 2024 10 | San Lorenzo | 0–1 | Atlético Tucumán |
| 14:30 UTC−3 |

| 18 August 2024 11 | Boca Juniors | 3–2 | San Lorenzo | Buenos Aires |
| 14:30 UTC−3 | | | | Stadium: La Bombonera |

=== Copa Argentina ===
| 28 February 2024 Round of 64 | San Lorenzo | 1–0 | Independiente de Chivilcoy | Quilmes |
| 21:10 UTC−3 | Tarragona 60' | | | Stadium: Estadio Centenario Ciudad de Quilmes; Referee: Edgardo Daniel Zamora |

| 7 June 2024 Round of 32 | San Lorenzo | 2–0 | Chacarita Juniors | Santa Fe |
| 20:00 UTC−3 | Leguizamón 8', 24' | | Tarragona (red card) 82' | Stadium: Estadio Brigadier General Estanislao López; Referee: Leandro Rey Hilfer |

=== Copa de la Liga Profesional ===
| 27 January 2024 1 | v |
