= 2025 Instituto Atlético Central Córdoba season =

Instituto Atlético Central Córdoba
2025 season
- Chairman: Juan Manuel Cavagliatto
- Manager: Daniel Oldrá
- Stadium: Estadio Juan Domingo Perón
- Torneo Apertura: Round of 16
- Torneo Clausura: Pre-season
- Copa Argentina: Round of 32
Home colours	Away colours

The 2025 season is the 115th for Instituto Atlético Central Córdoba and their 2nd consecutive season in the Primera División. The club will also take part in the Copa Argentina.

== Squad ==
=== Transfers In ===
Pos.	Player	Transferred from	Fee	Date	Source
MF	(Argentina) Francis Mac Allister	(Argentina) Argentinos Juniors	Loan	2 January 2025	
DF	(Uruguay) Emanuel Beltrán	(Uruguay) Boston River	Loan	6 January 2025	
DF	(Argentina) Elías Pereyra	(Argentina) Godoy Cruz	Loan	6 January 2025	
FW	(Argentina) Matías Godoy	(Argentina) Estudiantes de La Plata	Loan	16 January 2025	
FW	(Italy) Matias Fonseca	(Uruguay) Racing Montevideo	Undisclosed	19 June 2025	
MF	(Argentina) Juan Ignacio Méndez	(Argentina) Newell's Old Boys	Loan	24 July 2025	

== Exhibition matches ==
18 January 2025	Montevideo Wanderers (Uruguay)	1–0	(Argentina) Instituto
	90+6' (pen.)

21 January 2025 Friendly	Defensor Sporting (Uruguay)	1–1 (4–5 p)	(Argentina) Instituto

== Competitions ==
=== Overall record ===
Competition	First match	Last match	Starting round	Final position	Record							
Competition	First match	Last match	Starting round	Final position	Pld	W	D	L	GF	GA	GD	Win %
Torneo Apertura	25 January 2025	11 May 2025	Matchday 1	Round of 16	16	5	3	8	17	23	−6	31.25
Torneo Clausura	12 July 2025		Matchday 1		0	0	0	0	0	0	+0	—
Copa Argentina	3 April 2025	3 July 2025	Round of 64	Round of 32	2	1	1	0	3	0	+3	50.00
Total					18	6	4	8	20	23	−3	33.33

Last updated: 9 July 2025
Source: Competitions

=== Primera División ===
==== Torneo Apertura ====
===== League table =====
Pos	Team	Pld	W	D	L	GF	GA	GD	Pts	Qualification
6	Platense	16	6	5	5	13	11	+2	23	Advance to round of 16
7	Lanús	16	4	8	4	13	11	+2	20	Advance to round of 16
8	Instituto	16	5	3	8	16	20	−4	18	Advance to round of 16
9	Godoy Cruz	16	3	8	5	8	18	−10	17	
10	Atlético Tucumán	16	5	1	10	17	21	−4	16	

Source: AFA

===== Results by round =====
Round	1
Ground	H
Result	
Position	

A = Away; H = Home; W = Win; D = Draw; L = Loss

===== Matches =====
25 January 2025 1	Instituto	3–0	Gimnasia y Esgrima	Córdoba
19:15 UTC−3	Suárez 34' (pen.); Luna 75'; Acevedo 90+5'	Report		Stadium: Estadio Juan Domingo Perón

29 January 2025 2	River Plate	1–0	Instituto	Buenos Aires
21:30 (UTC−3)	Montiel 90'	Report		Stadium: Estadio Monumental; Referee: Yael Falcón Pérez

2 February 2025 3	Instituto	2–0	Vélez Sarsfield	Córdoba
21:30 UTC−3	Lodico 43'; Batallini 51'	Report		Stadium: Estadio Juan Domingo Perón

9 February 2025 4	Platense	1–0	Instituto	Florida
17:00 UTC−3	Lotti 56'	Report		Stadium: Estadio Ciudad de Vicente López

13 February 2025 5	Unión	0–0	Instituto	Santa Fe
22:15 UTC−3		Report		Stadium: Estadio 15 de Abril

17 February 2025 6	Instituto	0–1	San Lorenzo	Córdoba
21:30 UTC−3		Report	Vombergar 45+4' (pen.)	Stadium: Estadio Juan Domingo Perón

22 February 2025 7	Independiente	2–0	Instituto	Avellaneda
18:00 UTC−3	Angulo 53'; Mancuello 71' (pen.)	Report		Stadium: Estadio Libertadores de América

2 March 2025 8	Argentinos Juniors	2–0	Instituto	Buenos Aires
17:00 UTC−3	Rodríguez 55'; Molina 74'			Stadium: Estadio Diego Armando Maradona

9 March 2025 9	Instituto	1–1	Godoy Cruz	Córdoba
21:30 UTC−3	Batallini 42'	Report	Andino 37'	Stadium: Estadio Juan Domingo Perón

17 March 2025 10	Lanús	4–1	Instituto	Lanús
22:00 UTC−3	Carrera 44'; Segovia 61'; Moreno 70'; Canelo 90+2'	Report	Luna 18'	Stadium: Estadio Ciudad de Lanús

29 March 2025 11	Instituto	1–0	San Martín	Córdoba
16:30 UTC−3	Zalazar 86'	Report		Stadium: Estadio Juan Domingo Perón

7 April 2025 12	Atlético Tucumán	3–2	Instituto	Tucumán
21:00 UTC−3	Coronel 45'; Brizuela 49'; Laméndola 90+1'	Report	Luna 56', 81'	Stadium: Estadio Monumental José Fierro

13 April 2025 13	Instituto	3–0	Deportivo Riestra	Córdoba
15:30 UTC−3	Lodico 48', 61'; Randazzo 87' (o.g.)	Report		Stadium: Estadio Juan Domingo Perón

20 April 2025 14	Rosario Central	3–0	Instituto	Rosario
20:30 UTC−3	López 8': Duarte 68'; Copetti 90+4'	Report		Stadium: Estadio Gigante de Arroyito

27 April 2025 15	Instituto	1–1	Sarmiento	Córdoba
--:-- UTC−3	Lodico 67'	Report	Giménez 54'	Stadium: Estadio Juan Domingo Perón

3 May 2025 16	Talleres	1–2	Instituto	Córdoba
16:00 UTC−3	Galarza 13'	Report	Luna 43'; Puebla 80'	Stadium: Estadio Mario Alberto Kempes; Referee: Darío Herrera

===== Final stages =====
11 May 2025 Round of 16	Argentinos Juniors	3–1	Instituto	Buenos Aires
18:00 UTC−3	Molina 60'; Herrera 63'; Sosa 88'	Report	Requena 70'	Stadium: Diego Armando Maradona; Referee: Andrés Gariano

==== Torneo Clausura ====
===== League table =====
Pos	Team	Pld	W	D	L	GF	GA	GD	Pts	Qualification
7	Atlético Tucumán	12	4	3	5	13	13	0	15	Advance to round of 16
8	Sarmiento (J)	11	4	3	4	9	11	−2	15	Advance to round of 16
9	Instituto	12	3	6	3	7	11	−4	15	
10	San Martín (SJ)	12	3	5	4	9	11	−2	14	
11	Talleres (C)	12	3	5	4	7	10	−3	14	

Updated to match(es) played on 13 October 2025. Source: AFA

===== Matches =====
12 July 2025 1	Gimnasia y Esgrima	0–1	Instituto	La Plata
18:30 UTC−3		Report	Luna 44'	Stadium: Estadio Juan Carmelo Zerillo

19 July 2025 2	Instituto	0–4	River Plate	Córdoba
21:00 UTC−3		Report	Colidio 44'; Lencina 45+2', 67'; Galoppo 89'	Stadium: Estadio Monumental Presidente Perón

26 July 2025 3	Vélez Sarsfield	0–0	Instituto	Buenos Aires
19:00 UTC−3		Report		Stadium: José Amalfitani Stadium

10 August 2025 4	Instituto	1–1	Platense	Córdoba
17:00 UTC−3	Puebla 18'	Report	Martínez 90+5'	Stadium: Estadio Monumental Presidente Perón

15 August 2025 5	Instituto	0–4	Unión	Córdoba
19:00 UTC−3		Report	Pittón 8', 33'; Estigarribia 11'; Martínez 18'	Stadium: Estadio Monumental Presidente Perón

=== Copa Argentina ===
3 April 2025 Round of 64	Instituto	3–0	Deportivo Madryn	Caseros
18:45	Lázaro 8'; L. Klimowicz 45', 52'	Report		Stadium: Ciudad de Caseros; Referee: Ariel Penel

3 July 2025 Round of 32	Instituto	0–0 (2–3 p)	Huracán	Rosario
19:45		Report		Stadium: Marcelo Bielsa; Referee: Andrés Gariano
	Penalties
	Alarcón (penalty missed); Lodico (penalty missed); Rodríguez (penalty scored); Puebla (penalty scored); Luna (penalty missed)		(penalty missed) Gil; (penalty scored) Sequeira; (penalty scored) Guidara; (penalty scored) Pereyra
