= Facundo Gulli =

Argentine footballer (born 2005)

Personal information
- Date of birth: 25 September 2005 (age 21)
- Place of birth: Carapachay, Argentina
- Height: 1.78 m (5 ft 10 in)
- Position: Attacking midfielder

Team information
- Current team: San Lorenzo
- Number: 10

Youth career
- Argentinos Juniors
- 2016–2025: San Lorenzo

Senior career*
Years	Team	Apps	(Gls)
2025–	San Lorenzo	42	(3)
- * Club domestic league appearances and goals as of 17:56, 21 November 2026 (UTC)

Facundo Gulli (born 25 September 2005) is an Argentine footballer who plays as an attacking midfielder for San Lorenzo.

== Career ==
Born in Carapachay, Gulli joined San Lorenzo's youth sides in 2016, from Argentinos Juniors. After making his debut with the reserve team in 2024, he signed his first professional contract with the club on 26 June 2025, agreeing to a deal until December 2028, and was promoted to the main squad.

Gulli made his senior debut on 5 July 2025, starting in a 0–0 home draw (4–3 penalty win) over Quilmes, for the year's Copa Argentina. His Primera División debut occurred fourteen days later, as he came on as a late substitute for Andrés Vombergar in a 0–0 home draw against Gimnasia y Esgrima La Plata.

Gulli scored his first professional goal on 21 September 2025, netting the opener in a 1–1 away draw against Independiente.

== Career statistics ==
As of 25 May 2026

Club	Season	League			Cup		Continental		Other		Total	
Club	Season	Division	Apps	Goals	Apps	Goals	Apps	Goals	Apps	Goals	Apps	Goals
San Lorenzo	2025	Liga Profesional	12	2	1	0	—		—		13	2
San Lorenzo	2026	Liga Profesional	16	0	1	0	5 (Note: Appearance(s) in Copa Sudamericana)	0	—		22	0
Career total			28	2	2	0	5	0	0	0	35	2
