= 2026 San Lorenzo de Almagro season =

San Lorenzo de Almagro
2026 season
- Manager: Gustavo Álvarez
- Stadium: Estadio Pedro Bidegain
- Primera División: 6th
- Copa Argentina: Round of 32
- Copa Sudamericana: Group stage
- Top goalscorer: Alexis Cuello (4)

The 2026 season is the 118th season in the history of Club Atlético San Lorenzo de Almagro. In addition to the Primera División, the club participates in the Copa Argentina and the Copa Libertadores.

== Transfers ==
=== In ===
| Pos. | Player | Transferred from | Fee | Date | Source |
|---|---|---|---|---|---|
| DF | (Argentina) Gregorio Rodríguez | (Peru) Melgar | Loan | 19 January 2026 | |
| MF | (Argentina) Gonzalo Abrego | (Argentina) Godoy Cruz | Loan | 27 January 2026 | |
| DF | (Uruguay) Mathías De Ritis | (Uruguay) Peñarol | Undisclosed | 27 January 2026 | |
| DF | (Uruguay) Guzmán Corujo | (Colombia) Deportivo Cali | Undisclosed | 27 January 2026 | |
| FW | (Argentina) Rodrigo Auzmendi | (Argentina) Banfield | Loan | 10 March 2026 | |
| FW | (Argentina) Gustavo Del Prete | (Mexico) Atlas | Free | 28 July 2026 | |

== Competitions ==
=== Overall record ===
| Competition | First match | Last match | Starting round | Record | | | | | | | |
| Competition | First match | Last match | Starting round | Pld | W | D | L | GF | GA | GD | Win % |
|---|---|---|---|---|---|---|---|---|---|---|---|
| Primera División | 23 January 2026 | | Matchday 1 | 15 | 5 | 7 | 3 | 13 | 12 | +1 | 33.33 |
| Copa Argentina | 20 March 2026 | | Round of 64 | 1 | 1 | 0 | 0 | 5 | 0 | +5 | 100.00 |
| Copa Sudamericana | 8 April 2026 | | | 1 | 1 | 0 | 0 | 5 | 0 | +5 | 100.00 |
| Total | | | | 17 | 7 | 7 | 3 | 23 | 12 | +11 | 41.18 |

Source: Competitions

=== Primera División ===
==== Results by round ====
| Round | 1 | 2 | 3 | 4 | 5 | 6 | 7 | 8 | 9 | 10 | 11 | 12 | 13 | 14 | 15 | 16 |
|---|---|---|---|---|---|---|---|---|---|---|---|---|---|---|---|---|
| Ground | H | A | H | A | A | H | H | A | H | A | H | A | H | A | H | A |
| Result | L | W | W | L | D | W | D | D | P | D | L | D | W | D | D | W |
| Position | | | | | | | | | | | | | | | | |

A = Away; H = Home; W = Win; D = Draw; L = Loss

| 23 January 2026 1 | San Lorenzo | 2–3 | Lanús |
| 19:00 |

| 27 January 2026 2 | Gimnasia de Mendoza | 0–1 | San Lorenzo |
| 20:00 |

| 31 January 2026 3 | San Lorenzo | 1–0 | Central Córdoba |
| 17:30 |

| 8 February 2026 4 | Huracán | 1–0 | San Lorenzo |
| 19:15 |

| 13 February 2026 5 | Unión | 0–0 | San Lorenzo |
| 22:15 |

| 22 February 2026 6 | San Lorenzo | 2–0 | Estudiantes de Río Cuarto |
| 17:00 |

| 24 February 2026 7 | San Lorenzo | 1–1 | Instituto |
| 19:15 |

| 28 February 2026 8 | Talleres | 0–0 | San Lorenzo |
| 22:15 |

| 11 March 2026 10 | Boca Juniors | 1–1 | San Lorenzo |
| 19:45 |

| 16 March 2026 11 | San Lorenzo | 2–5 | Defensa y Justicia |
| 18:30 |

| 25 March 2026 12 | Deportivo Riestra | 1–1 | San Lorenzo |
| 19:00 |

| 3 April 2026 13 | San Lorenzo | 1–0 | Estudiantes de La Plata |
| 19:30 |

| 12 April 2026 14 | Newell's Old Boys | 0–0 | San Lorenzo |
| 15:00 |

| 20 April 2026 15 | San Lorenzo | 0–0 | Vélez Sarsfield |
| 19:30 |

| 24 April 2026 16 | Platense | 0–1 | San Lorenzo |
| 21:30 |

| 2 May 2026 9 | San Lorenzo | 1–2 | Independiente |
| 18:45 |

=== Copa Argentina ===
| 20 March 2026 Round of 64 | San Lorenzo | 5–0 | Deportivo Rincón |
| 21:15 |

=== Copa Sudamericana ===
==== Group stage ====
| Pos | Team | Pld | W | D | L | GF | GA | GD | Pts | Qualification |
|---|---|---|---|---|---|---|---|---|---|---|
| 1 | (Paraguay) Recoleta | 6 | 1 | 5 | 0 | 6 | 5 | +1 | 8 | Advance to round of 16 |
| 2 | (Brazil) Santos | 6 | 1 | 4 | 1 | 8 | 6 | +2 | 7 | Advance to knockout round play-offs |
| 3 | (Argentina) San Lorenzo | 6 | 1 | 4 | 1 | 6 | 5 | +1 | 7 | |
| 4 | (Ecuador) Deportivo Cuenca | 6 | 1 | 3 | 2 | 3 | 7 | −4 | 6 | |

Source: CONMEBOL
Rules for classification: 1) Points; 2) Head-to-head points; 3) Head-to-head goal difference; 4) Head-to-head goals scored; 5) Goal difference; 6) Goals scored; 7) Red cards; 8) Yellow cards; 9) Drawing of lots.

| Round | 1 | 2 | 3 | 4 |
|---|---|---|---|---|
| Ground | A | H | H | A |
| Result | D | W | D | D |
| Position | | | | |

Updated to match(es) played on 5 May 2026. Source:
A = Away; H = Home; W = Win; D = Draw; L = Loss

| 8 April 2026 1 | Recoleta (Paraguay) | 1–1 | (Argentina) San Lorenzo | Asunción, Paraguay |
| 19:00 UTC−3 | Marotta (yellow card) 11'; Wlk 13'; Echeguren (yellow card) 51'; Monzon (yellow card) 82' | | Auzmendi 17'; De Ritis (yellow card) 74' | Stadium: Estadio Defensores del Chaco; Referee: Cristián Garay (Chile) |

| 16 April 2026 2 | San Lorenzo (Argentina) | 2–0 | (Ecuador) Deportivo Cuenca | Buenos Aires |
| 21:30 UTC−3 | Romaña 63'; Tripichio 73'; Gill (yellow card) 90' | | Postel (yellow card) 54'; Klimowicz (yellow card) 90+1' | Stadium: Estadio Pedro Bidegain; Referee: Yender Herrera (Venezuela) |

| 28 April 2026 3 | San Lorenzo (Argentina) | 1–1 | (Brazil) Santos | Buenos Aires |
| 19:00 UTC−3 | | | | Stadium: Estadio Pedro Bidegain; Referee: Jhon Ospina (Colombia) |

| 5 May 2026 4 | Deportivo Cuenca (Ecuador) | 0–0 | (Argentina) San Lorenzo | Cuenca, Ecuador |
| 21:00 UTC−5 | | | | Stadium: Estadio Alejandro Serrano Aguilar |
