= Santiago Rodríguez =

Santiago Rodríguez may refer to:

- Santiago Rodríguez Masagó, Dominican military leader
- Santiago Rodríguez Province, province of the Dominican Republic
- Santiago Luis Polanco Rodríguez (born 1961), Dominican American former drug dealer
- Santiago Rodriguez (pianist), Cuban musician
- Santiago Rodríguez (footballer, born 2000), Uruguayan footballer
- Santiago Rodríguez (footballer, born 1997), Argentine footballer
