= Francisco Flores (Argentine footballer) =

Argentine footballer (born 2002)

Personal information
- Full name: Alexis Francisco Flores
- Date of birth: 11 January 2002 (age 24)
- Place of birth: Munro, Argentina
- Height: 1.82 m (6 ft 0 in)
- Position: Centre-back

Team information
- Current team: Deportivo Morón (on loan from San Lorenzo)

Youth career
- Club de Olivos
- 2014–2020: San Lorenzo

Senior career*
Years	Team	Apps	(Gls)
2020–	San Lorenzo	26	(0)
2023–2024	→ Atlético Tucumán (loan)	27	(0)
2025	→ Quilmes (loan)	27	(0)
2026–	→ Deportivo Morón (loan)	0	(0)

International career
2017	Argentina U15		
2018–2019	Argentina U17	13	(2)
2020–	Argentina U20		
- * Club domestic league appearances and goals as of 18:16, 13 March 2026 (UTC)

Alexis Francisco Flores (born 11 January 2002) is an Argentine professional footballer who plays as a centre-back for Deportivo Morón, on loan from San Lorenzo.

== Club career ==
Flores concurrently played for three clubs, including Club de Olivos, before joining San Lorenzo at the end of 2014. He was promoted into the first-team in 2020, when manager Diego Monarriz selected him to start and finish a Torneos de Verano friendly with Talleres on 11 January. He was subsequently on the bench for two competitive fixtures in March under caretaker managers Leandro Romagnoli and Hugo Tocalli. It was, after six further matches as an unused sub, under Mariano Soso that Flores would make his debut, as he replaced Alexis Sabella during a Copa de la Liga Profesional win away to Atlético Tucumán on 29 December.

== International career ==
Flores represented Argentina at various youth levels. He was a part of the squad that won the 2017 South American U-15 Championship, with the centre-back scoring a goal during a draw with Chile on 11 November. Two years later, Flores made seven appearances as they won the 2019 South American U-17 Championship in Peru. At the subsequent FIFA U-17 World Cup, Flores scored a goal against Cameroon. He also featured at numerous friendly tournaments at youth level, as well as appearing in U17 friendlies with the United States and, scoring against, New Zealand. In December 2020, Flores received a call-up from the U20s.

== Style of play ==
Flores is primarily a centre-back, though did start out his youth career as a central midfielder.

== Career statistics ==
As of 30 December 2020.

Appearances and goals by club, season and competition
Club	Season	League			Cup		League Cup		Continental		Other		Total	
Club	Season	Division	Apps	Goals	Apps	Goals	Apps	Goals	Apps	Goals	Apps	Goals	Apps	Goals
San Lorenzo	2019–20	Primera División	0	0	0	0	0	0	—		0	0	0	0
San Lorenzo	2020–21 (Note: Soccerway counts Copa de la Liga Profesional appearances as league appearances.)	Primera División	1	0	0	0	0	0	—		0	0	1	0
Career total			1	0	0	0	0	0	—		0	0	1	0

== Honours ==
Argentina U15

- South American U-15 Championship: 2017

Argentina U17

- South American U-17 Championship: 2019
