= Ariel Gamarra =

Paraguayan footballer

Personal information
- Full name: Pablo Ariel Gamarra González
- Date of birth: 26 February 2003 (age 23)
- Place of birth: Asunción, Paraguay.
- Height: 1.75 m (5 ft 9 in)
- Position: Midfielder

Team information
- Current team: Argentinos Juniors

Youth career
- Argentinos Juniors

Senior career*
Years	Team	Apps	(Gls)
2023–	Argentinos Juniors	29	(0)
2025–2026	→ Puebla (loan)	14	(0)

International career
2022–2023	Paraguay U20	6	(0)
- * Club domestic league appearances and goals as of 17:45, 5 September 2025 (UTC)

Pablo Ariel Gamarra González (born Asunción, February 2003) is a Paraguayan footballer who plays as a midfielder for Argentine Primera División club Argentinos Juniors.

== Career ==
After coming through the Argentinos Juniors youth setup, he signed his first professional contract for the club on 12 September 2022, signing until the end of 2026. After breaking through in the 2024 season, he suffered from a lack of opportunities in 2025.

In July 2025, he moved abroad to sign for Liga MX club Puebla on loan, joining up again with former manager Pablo Guede. On 9 August 2025, he was sent off in a 7–0 loss to Tigres.

== International career ==
In 2023, he played for Paraguay at the South American U-20 Championship.

== Career statistics ==
As of 5 September 2025

Club	Season	League			Cup		Continental		Other		Total	
Club	Season	Division	Apps	Goals	Apps	Goals	Apps	Goals	Apps	Goals	Apps	Goals
Argentinos Juniors	2024	Primera División	25	0	2	0	2 (Note: Appearance(s) in Copa Sudamericana)	0	—		29	0
Argentinos Juniors	2025	Primera División	4	0	—		—		—		4	0
Puebla	2025–26	Liga MX	5	0	—		—		3 (Note: Appearance(s) in Leagues Cup)	0	8	0
Career total			34	0	2	0	2	0	3	0	41	0
