= Jorge Sotomayor =

Argentine footballer

Personal information
- Full name: Jorge Luis Sotomayor
- Date of birth: 29 March 1988 (age 38)
- Place of birth: Munro, Buenos Aires, Argentina
- Height: 1.80 m (5 ft 11 in)
- Position: Centre-back

Team information
- Current team: Deportivo Mixco
- Number: 6

Youth career
- River Plate

Senior career*
Years	Team	Apps	(Gls)
2005–2007	River Plate	0	(0)
2008–2009	Deportes La Serena	34	(2)
2009	Fortaleza	0	(0)
2009	Colegiales	5	(0)
2010–2011	Deportes Antofagasta	27	(0)
2011–2012	Colegiales	1	(0)
2012–2016	Unión San Felipe	76	(4)
2012	Unión San Felipe B	20	(0)
2016–2017	Rangers	41	(2)
2018	Deportes Melipilla	26	(2)
2019	Cobán Imperial	35	(2)
2020–2021	Cobán Imperial	34	(0)
2021–	Deportivo Mixco	67	(3)

International career
2005	Argentina U17	3	(0)
- * Club domestic league appearances and goals as of 13 May 2024

Jorge Luis Sotomayor (born 29 March 1988) is an Argentine footballer for Guatemalan club Deportivo Mixco.

== Career ==
He played during several years in Chilean football. There, he defended clubs such as Deportes La Serena, Unión San Felipe or Deportes Melipilla.

In January 2009, he signed with Brazilian club Fortaleza alongside his compatriot Jonathan Guerazar from Deportes La Serena.

In his homeland, he had two stints with Colegiales in 2009 and 2011–12.

In 2019, he signed with Guatemalan club Cobán Imperial. He rejoined them in 2020.
