= Matías Giménez (footballer, born 1999) =

Argentine footballer

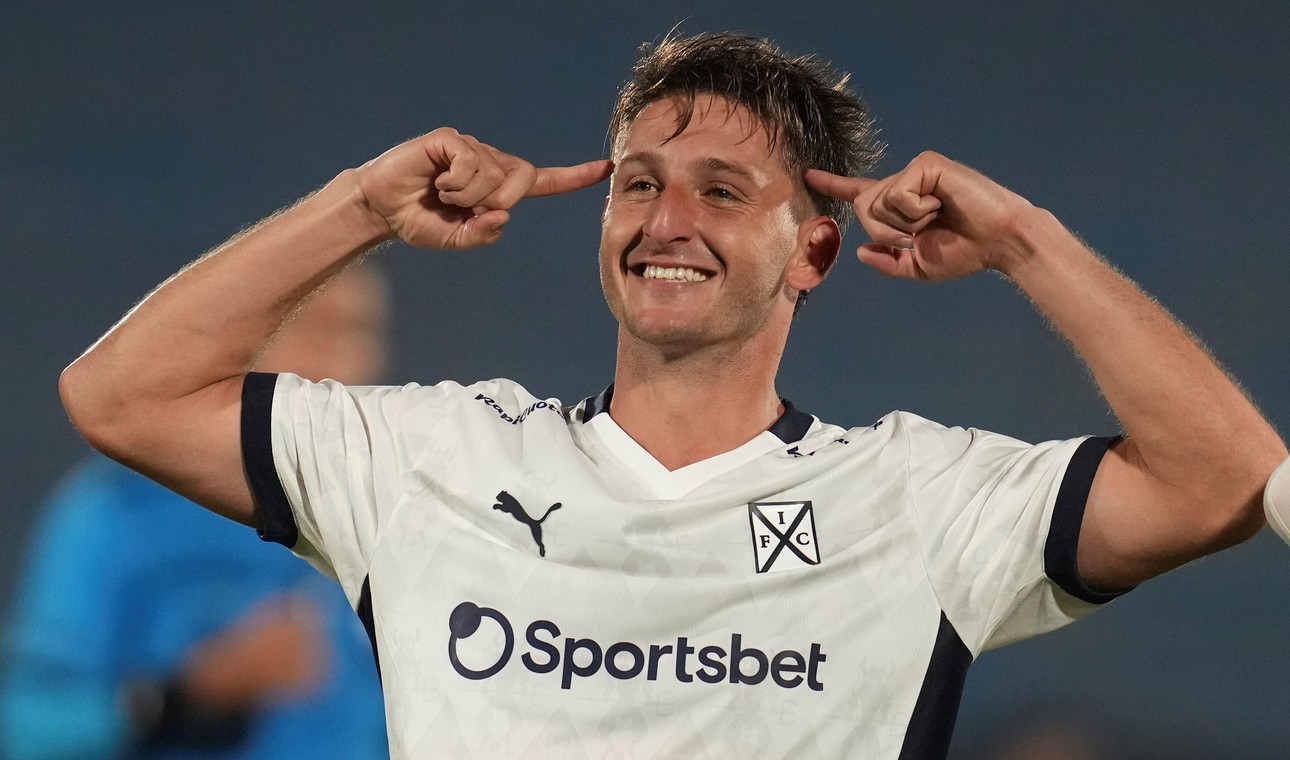

Personal information
- Full name: Matías Daniel Giménez Rojas
- Date of birth: 6 March 1999 (age 27)
- Place of birth: San Juan, Argentina
- Height: 1.85 m (6 ft 1 in)
- Position: Centre-forward

Team information
- Current team: Argentinos Juniors
- Number: 34

Youth career
- San Martín SJ

Senior career*
Years	Team	Apps	(Gls)
2019–2023	San Martín SJ	90	(24)
2023–2025	Independiente	64	(11)
2025–	Argentinos Juniors	8	(1)
- * Club domestic league appearances and goals as of 18:00, 19 February 2026 (UTC)

Matías Daniel Giménez Rojas (born 6 March 1999) is a Colombian professional footballer who plays as a centre-forward for Argentinos Juniors.

== Career ==
=== San Martín SJ ===
Giménez came through the youth setup at San Martín SJ, where he made his first team debut on 24 August 2019 in a 1–0 defeat to Estudiantes BA. He scored his first goal on 21 December 2020 in a 1–1 draw against Mitre.

=== Independiente ===
In January 2023, he joined Liga Profesional club Independiente for a fee around $800,000. He made his debut on 28 January in a 1–0 victory against Talleres. He scored his first goal for the club on 18 March 2023, in a 2–2 draw against Colón. He scored again a week later in a 3–0 win over Ciudad de Bolívar in the Copa Argentina. On 7 May 2025, he scored twice in the Copa Sudamericana in a 5–1 away win at Uruguayan side Boston River.

=== Argentinos Juniors ===
In July 2025, he permanently joined fellow Liga Profesional club Argentinos Juniors, signing a contract until the end of 2029. On 22 September in a 3–0 win against Banfield, he suffered an anterior cruciate ligament rupture with an estimated recovery time being at least 6 months.

== Career statistics ==
As of 19 February 2026

Appearances and goals by club, season and competition
Club	Season	League			Cup (Note: Includes Copa Argentina)		Continental		Other		Total	
Club	Season	Division	Goals	Apps	Apps	Goals	Apps	Goals	Apps	Goals	Apps	Goals
San Martín SJ	2019–20	Primera Nacional	15	0	—		—		—		15	0
San Martín SJ	2020	Primera Nacional	9	2	2	1	—		—		11	3
San Martín SJ	2021	Primera Nacional	30	8	—		—		—		30	8
San Martín SJ	2022	Primera Nacional	36	14	—		—		—		36	14
San Martín SJ	Total		90	24	2	1	0	0	0	0	92	25
Independiente	2023	Liga Profesional	40	9	3	1	—		—		43	10
Independiente	2024	Liga Profesional	8	2	—		—		—		8	2
Independiente	2025	Liga Profesional	16	0	2	0	4 (Note: Appearances in Copa Sudamericana)	2	—		22	2
Independiente	Total		64	11	5	1	4	2	0	0	73	14
Argentinos Juniors	2025	Liga Profesional	8	1	2	0	—		—		10	1
Career total			162	36	9	2	4	2	0	0	175	40
