= Ezequiel Herrera =

Argentine footballer (born 2003)

Personal information
- Full name: Ezequiel Ernesto Herrera Gómez
- Date of birth: 22 January 2003 (age 23)
- Place of birth: Benavídez, Argentina
- Height: 1.80 m (5 ft 11 in)
- Position: Right-back

Team information
- Current team: San Lorenzo
- Number: 32

Youth career
- San Lorenzo

Senior career*
Years	Team	Apps	(Gls)
2021–	San Lorenzo	66	(1)
2024	→ Colón (loan)	30	(0)
- * Club domestic league appearances and goals as of 18:09, 21 November 2026 (UTC)

Ezequiel Ernesto Herrera Gómez (born 22 January 2003) is an Argentine footballer who plays as a right-back for San Lorenzo.

== Career ==
Born in Benavídez, Herrera was a San Lorenzo youth graduate, and made his senior – and Primera División – debut on 12 December 2021, coming on as a late substiute for Gino Peruzzi in a 3–2 home win over Newell's Old Boys. On 25 May 2022, after another four first team appearances, he signed his first professional contract with the club.

On 24 January 2024, after being rarely used, Herrera was loaned to Primera Nacional side Colón until the end of the year. Despite being regularly used, the club opted not to activate the buyout clause.

Back to Ciclón for the 2025 season, Herrera established himself as a regular starter, and renewed his link until December 2027 on 10 April of that year. He scored his first senior goal on 2 May 2026, but in a 2–1 home loss to Independiente.

== Career statistics ==
As of 1 July 2026

Club	Season	League			Cup		Continental		Other		Total	
Club	Season	Division	Apps	Goals	Apps	Goals	Apps	Goals	Apps	Goals	Apps	Goals
San Lorenzo	2021	Liga Profesional	1	0	0	0	—		—		1	0
San Lorenzo	2022	Liga Profesional	4 (Note: Soccerway counts Copa de la Liga Profesional appearances as league appearances.)	0	0	0	—		—		4	0
San Lorenzo	2023	Liga Profesional	2	0	0	0	1 (Note: Appearance(s) in Copa Sudamericana)	0	—		3	0
San Lorenzo	2025	Liga Profesional	32	0	3	0	—		—		35	0
San Lorenzo	2026	Liga Profesional	16	1	1	0	6	0	—		23	1
San Lorenzo	Total		55	1	4	0	7	0	—		66	1
Colón (loan)	2024	Primera Nacional	30	0	2	0	—		—		32	0
Career total			85	1	6	0	7	0	0	0	98	1
