= Munro, Buenos Aires =

Munro
- District
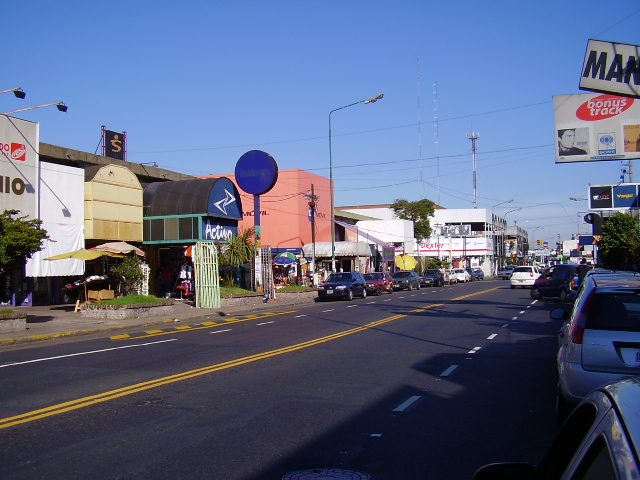
- Munro commercial center on Avenida Mitre

- Location in Greater Buenos Aires
- Coordinates: 34°32′S 58°31′W
- Country: Argentina
- Province: Buenos Aires
- Partido: Vicente López
- Founded: 30 April 1912
- Elevation: 26 m (85 ft)

Population (2001 census [INDEC])
  - Total: 35,844
- CPA Base: B 1605
- Area code: +54 11

Munro is a city of the Vicente López Partido in northern Greater Buenos Aires, Argentina, best known for its jeans and apparel stores and outlets. It is located some 20 km from the downtown of the city.

It is bordered by the neighborhoods of Villa Adelina, Carapachay and Martínez on the north; Villa Ballester on the west; Florida Este in the south; and Olivos to the east. The border streets are Mariano Moreno, Bartolomé Mitre Avenue, Paraná, National Highway 9 (Panamericana), Antonio Malaver, Alexander Fleming, Luis María Drago, Primera Junta, Montes de Oca, Capitán Cajaraville, Juramento, Carlos Calvo, Albarellos, and Belgrano.

There are many sports clubs in Munro such as Unión Vecinal de Fomento Munro (founded on 1922), Olivos Rugby Club (1927), Club Unión de Munro (1946), Club Social y Deportivo Industrial Munro (1947).

Some of Munro's local industries are: Atanor, Fabriloza, Colorín, Virulana, Ripán, Telagoma, Bayer, Gillette and other factories of clothing, lumber, steel, food, etc. In the town were located the Lumiton filming studios (they still exist today as a museum of the movies filmed there).

== History ==
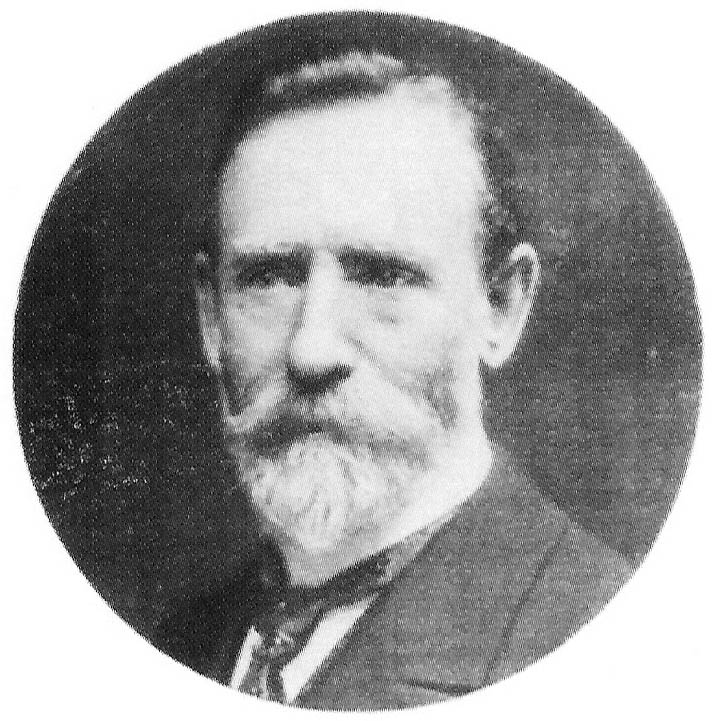
The neighborhood owes its name to Duncan M. Munro, a Scottish manager of Córdoba Central Railway that donated lands to build the station

Although a grocery store (known as "Pualpería del Fondo de la Legua" and owned by merchant Gregorio Rodríguez) had existed on the corner of Avenida Mitre and Vélez Sarsfield by 1850, the neighborhood of Munro was born with the construction of a station of the Córdoba Central rail line (now Ferrocarril General Belgrano) on April 30, 1912. The English railway company, associated to the Compañía Argentina de Tierras del Norte, acquired lands near the railway and charged its station chief, Alfredo Dionisio Godoy, the lands sale. The station has its name after Scottish immigrant Duncan Mackay Munro (1844–1929), who managed several railway companies in Argentina including Buenos Aires and Ensenada, Santa Fe, and Córdoba Central. Munro was also a member of committees for road construction and agriculture and a founding member of the Scottish Church of Buenos Aires. Munro donated lands to build the train station and a park in the current "Munro" district. Besides, Munro's daughter, Adelina Munro Drysdale, would be later honored giving her name to the Villa Adelina district. Another neighboring town named after her, "Drysdale", was then changed to Carapachay.

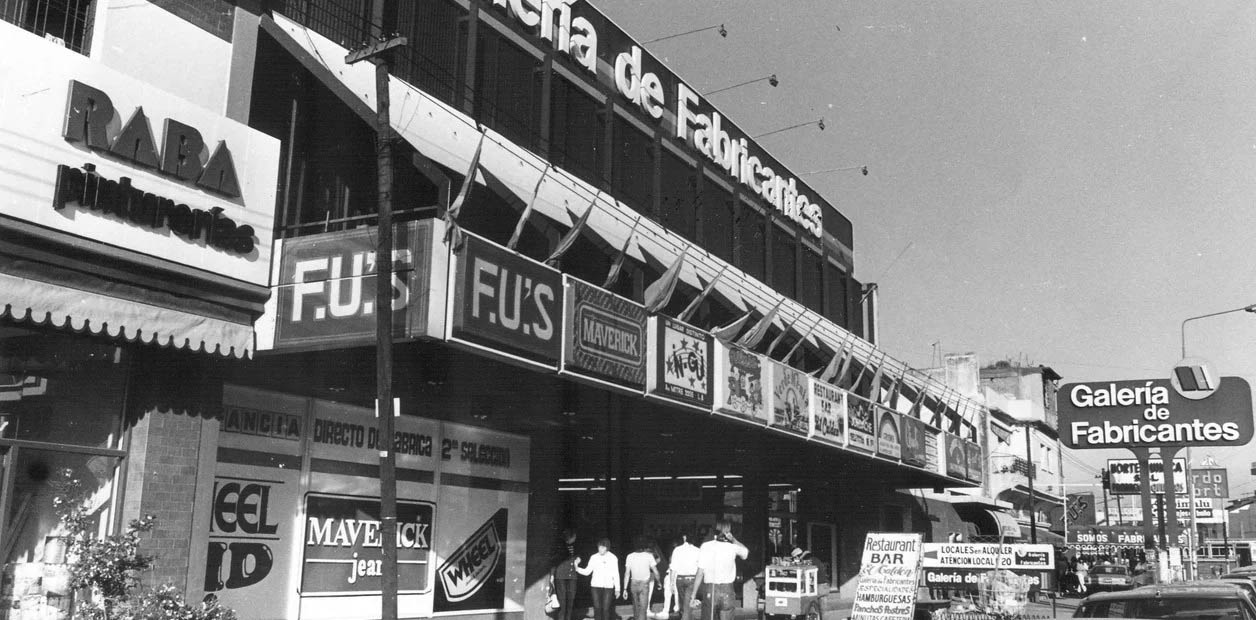
The commercial centre of Munro on Avenida Mitre in the 1980s

On June 11, 1922, 49 neighbors led by Alfredo Dionisio Godoy founded the Unión Vecinal de Fomento de Munro. With the population growth, many stores were opened that formed an important commercial center. Munro was also the site of Lumiton Studios, a movie production house founded by local radio pioneer Enrique Susini which, from 1931 to 1952, turned out over 180 full-length films and became among the best-known in Argentine cinema. On November 11, 1961, the partido's first school was founded: School Nº4 Domingo Faustino Sarmiento. On March 22, 1965, the Santa María Reina church was founded, and since 1996 it has belonged to the San Isidro Obispado.

Avenida Mitre consolidated as the main commercial center of the neighborhood after American jeans manufacturers Lee and Wrangler opened their shops there in the early 1970s. Levi's arrived in 1976. They commercialized second-choice clothing with good sales.

In 1981 Mitre Avenue was repaired, thus modernizing the commercial center. In 1984, the Governor of Buenos Aires Alejandro Armendáriz promulgated a decree that named the city "Capital de la Indumentaria" to promote selling clothing in the district. During the 1970s and 1980s, the commercial center was a great success and one of the main drivers of the economy of Vicente López Partido. The boom of the textile industry brought a lot of people to Munro in search of jeans (the most popular of its products) but also t-shirts, and sweaters, which could be bought at affordable prices, as much as 50% less than other stores.

In 1995 the Centro Cultural Munro (Munro Cultural Center) was inaugurated with a capacity for 870 people.

== Population ==
The city area is approximately 5.8 km² and is populated by 35,844 (2001 census [INDEC]), being the third most populous city in the partido, with 13.1% of its total population. In 1991 there were 36,188 citizens, which implies a 1% drop compared to 2001.

== Education ==
There are few educational institutions located at Munro. The renowned includes:

- Institute of Integral Education Munro
- Clases Particulares De Inglés Y Matemática
- Escuela Primaria No. 32 "MARIA LUISA IRIBARNE DE ORTIZ"
- Higher Institute of Teacher Training and Technical No. 77

The area once had a German school, Deutsche Schule Munro.

== Notable people ==
- Julio Bocca
- Jorge Sotomayor (born 1988), Argentine footballer
- Miguel Abuelo

== Sports ==
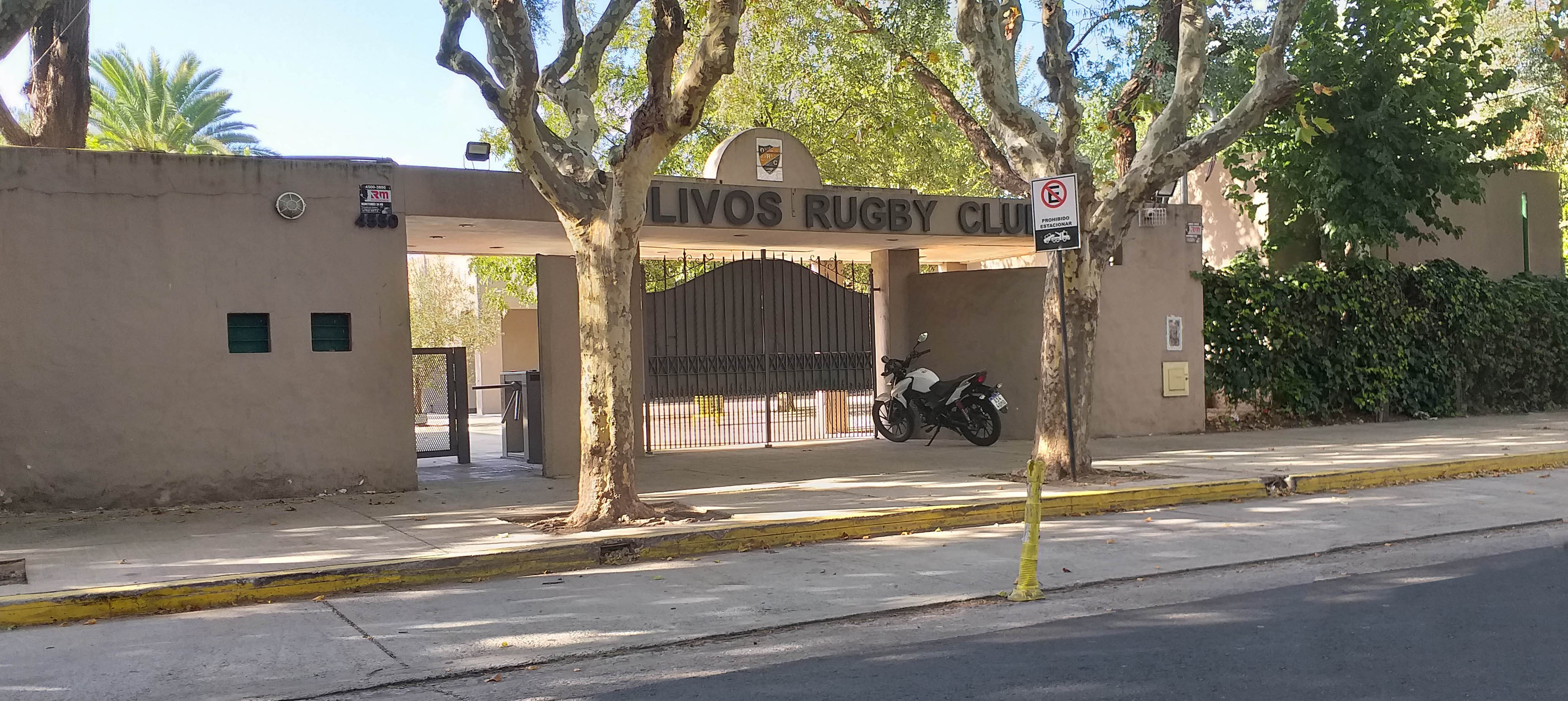
Main entrance to Olivos Rugby Club, Munro's most notable sports club

The most important activity is football, with several social clubs hosting the sport apart from other activities. Club Atlético Colegiales was established in 1908 as "Club Atlético Libertarios Unidos" in the city of Buenos Aires. The club is affiliated with the Argentine Football Association and has played in the competitions organized by the body since then. Colegiales moved to their new location on Antonio Malaver and Gervasio Posadas streets (then Munro, currently Florida Oeste) in 1948, where the institution has been located since then.

Rugby union and field hockey are represented by the Olivos Rugby Club, established in 1927. The rugby teams compete in tournaments organized by the Unión de Rugby de Buenos Aires (URBA).

== Gallery ==
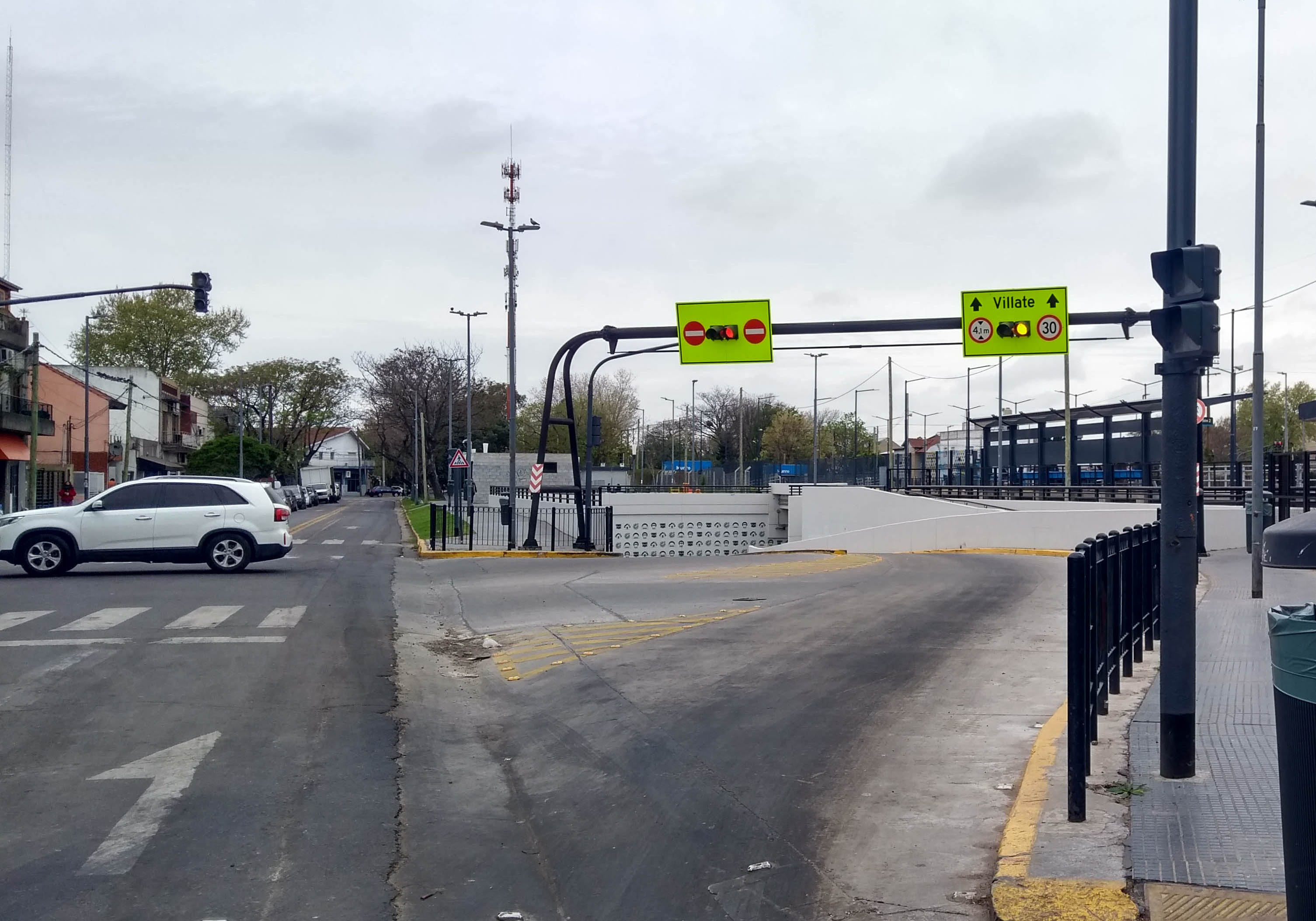
Underpass on Baigorria street

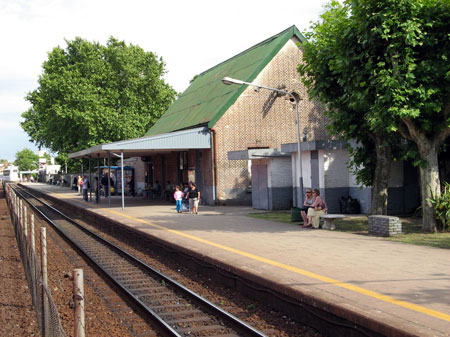
Train station

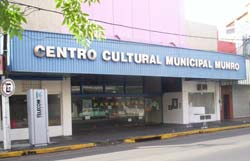
Cultural Center

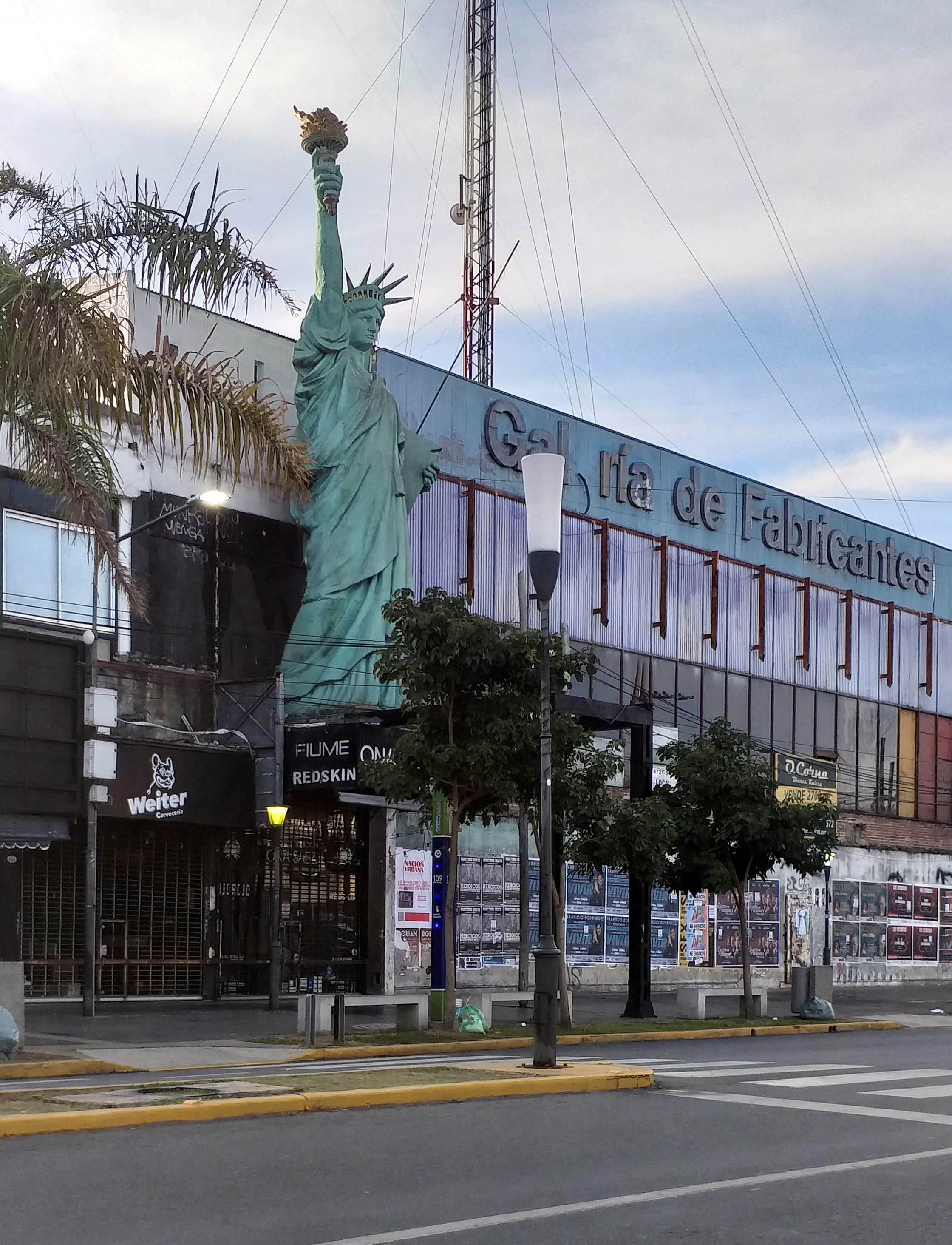
Replica of Statue of Liberty

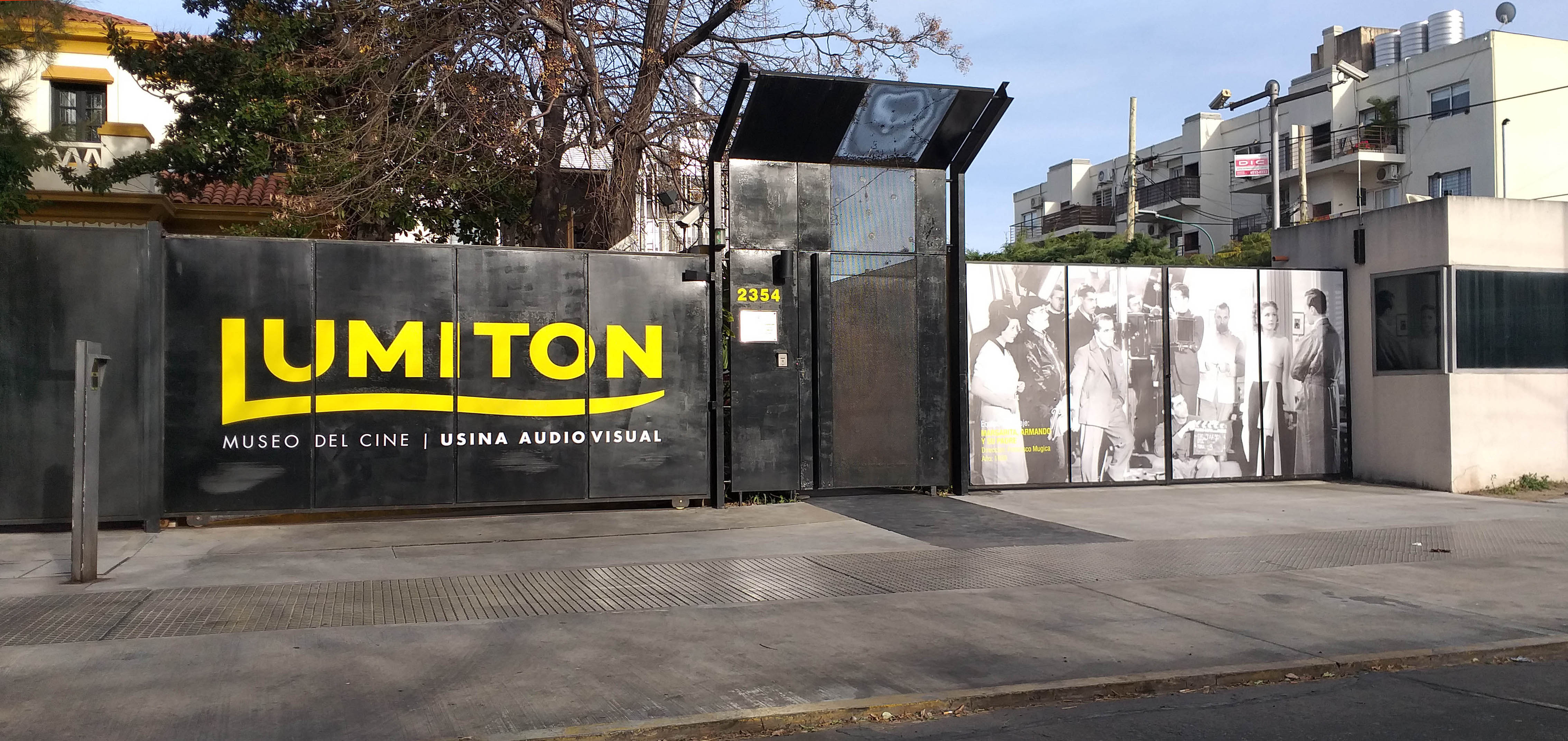
Lumiton Museum of Cinema
