= José María Herrera =

Argentine footballer

Personal information
- Full name: José María Herrera Ares
- Date of birth: 16 April 2003 (age 23)
- Place of birth: San Miguel de Tucumán, Argentina
- Height: 1.72 m (5 ft 8 in)
- Position: Winger

Team information
- Current team: Red Bull Bragantino
- Number: 32

Youth career
- Argentinos Juniors

Senior career*
Years	Team	Apps	(Gls)
2022–2025	Argentinos Juniors	82	(9)
2025	Fortaleza	19	(2)
2026–	Red Bull Bragantino	24	(1)

International career
2019	Argentina U16	3	(1)
- * Club domestic league appearances and goals as of 7 April 2026

José María Herrera Ares (born 16 April 2003) is an Argentine professional footballer who plays as a winger for Campeonato Brasileiro Série A club Red Bull Bragantino.

== Career ==
Herrera came through the youth system at Argentinos Juniors and made his debut with the first team on 11 June 2022 in a 1–0 defeat against Sarmiento. He scored his first goal in the next month in a 3–1 win against Barracas Central. in the 2024 season, he began to start more frequently and earned plaudits for his performances.

=== Fortaleza ===
In June 2025, Herrera moved abroad to join Campeonato Brasileiro Série A side Fortaleza for a fee of $2.4 million, signing a 5-year contract.

== Career statistics ==
As of match played 3 December 2025

Appearances and goals by club, season and competition
Club	Season	League			National cup (Note: Includes Copa Argentina)		Continental		Other		Total	
Club	Season	Division	Goals	Apps	Apps	Goals	Apps	Goals	Apps	Goals	Apps	Goals
Argentinos Juniors	2022	Argentine Primera División	20	1	0	0	—		—		20	1
Argentinos Juniors	2023	Argentine Primera División	13	0	0	0	1 (Note: Appearance(s) in Copa Libertadores)	0	—		14	0
Argentinos Juniors	2024	Argentine Primera División	32	4	2	0	4 (Note: Appearances in Copa Sudamericana)	0	—		38	4
Argentinos Juniors	2025	Argentine Primera División	17	4	2	1	—		—		19	5
Argentinos Juniors	Total		82	9	4	1	5	0	0	0	91	10
Fortaleza	2025	Série A	19	2	—		2	0	0	0	21	2
Career total			101	11	4	1	7	0	0	0	113	12
