= Jeremías James =

Argentine footballer

Personal information
- Full name: Jeremías James Griffiths
- Date of birth: 29 January 2001 (age 25)
- Place of birth: Trelew, Chubut, Argentina
- Height: 1.91 m (6 ft 3 in)
- Position: Centre-back

Team information
- Current team: Magallanes
- Number: 41

Youth career
- Los Aromos
- Huracán de Trelew
- C.A.I.
- 2019: Racing de Trelew
- 2019–2021: San Lorenzo

Senior career*
Years	Team	Apps	(Gls)
2022–2025	San Lorenzo	12	(0)
2023	→ Barracas Central (loan)	2	(0)
2024	→ Deportivo Riestra (loan)	2	(1)
2025	→ Alvarado (loan)	8	(0)
2025	→ Magallanes (loan)	11	(0)
2026–	Magallanes	0	(0)
- * Club domestic league appearances and goals as of 4 February 2026

Jeremías James Griffiths (born 29 January 2001), known as Jeremías James, is an Argentine footballer who plays as a centre-back for Chilean club Magallanes.

== Club career ==
Born in Trelew, Argentina, James was with the local clubs Los Aromos, Huracán de Trelew, C.A.I. and Racing de Trelew before joining San Lorenzo de Almagro. A left-footed defender, he signed his first professional contract and was promoted to the senior team under Pedro Troglio in January 2022. On 9 July of the same year, he suffered an ACL injury in the match against Boca Juniors.

In October 2023, James was loaned out to Barracas Central. The next year, he was loaned out to Deportivo Riestra and scored his first goal at professional level in the 2–1 away loss against Instituto on 1 December.

In 2025, James was loaned out to Alvarado in the Primera B Nacional. In the second half of the same year, he moved to Chile and joined Magallanes.

Back to San Lorenzo, James rejoined Magallanes in February 2026.

== Personal life ==
At the age of nine, James was diagnosed with leukemia and recovered around December 2010.

He is of Welsh descent, and his grandfather, Horacio "Galenso" Griffiths, is a well-known football coach at the Liga de Fútbol Valle del Chubut.
