= Gonzalo Requena =

Argentine footballer (born 2003)

Personal information
- Date of birth: 4 March 2003 (age 23)
- Place of birth: San Francisco, Argentina
- Height: 1.85 m (6 ft 1 in)
- Position: Centre-back

Team information
- Current team: Tigre (on loan from Instituto)
- Number: 23

Senior career*
Years	Team	Apps	(Gls)
2023–	Instituto	39	(2)
2026	→ Krylia Sovetov Samara (loan)	2	(0)
2026–	→ Tigre (loan)	4	(0)
- * Club domestic league appearances and goals as of 17:53, 9 November 2026 (UTC)

Gonzalo Requena (born 4 March 2003) is an Argentine football player who plays as a centre-back for Tigre, on loan from Instituto.

== Career ==
On 19 February 2026, Requena moved to Russian club Krylia Sovetov Samara on loan until the end of 2026.

He made his debut in the Russian Premier League for Krylia Sovetov on 8 March 2026 in a game against Dynamo Makhachkala.

On 19 July 2026, Krylia Sovetov terminated the loan early by mutual consent.

== Career statistics ==
As of 7 April 2026

Club	Season	League			Cup		Other		Total	
Club	Season	Division	Apps	Goals	Apps	Goals	Apps	Goals	Apps	Goals
Instituto	2023	Argentine Primera División	0	0	—		—		0	0
Instituto	2024	Argentine Primera División	25	2	—		2 (Note: Appearances in Copa de la Liga Profesional)	0	27	2
Instituto	2025	Argentine Primera División	14	0	1	0	1 (Note: Appearances in Apertura play-offs)	1	16	1
Instituto	2026	Argentine Primera División	0	0	—		—		0	0
Instituto	Total		39	2	1	0	3	1	43	3
Krylia Sovetov Samara (loan)	2025–26	Russian Premier League	2	0	1	0	—		3	0
Career total			41	2	2	0	3	1	46	3
