= Joaquín Gho =

Argentine professional footballer

Personal information
- Date of birth: 14 May 2003 (age 23)
- Place of birth: Lincoln, Argentina
- Position: Right midfielder

Team information
- Current team: Argentinos Juniors
- Number: 28

Youth career
- Rivadavia
- 2016–2020: Sarmiento

Senior career*
Years	Team	Apps	(Gls)
2020–2025	Sarmiento	72	(4)
2025–	Argentinos Juniors	8	(0)
- * Club domestic league appearances and goals as of 17:19, 22 December 2025 (UTC)

Joaquín Gho (born 14 May 2003) is an Argentine professional footballer who plays as a right midfielder for Sarmiento.

== Career ==
Gho began his career aged three with Rivadavia, remaining until the age of thirteen when he departed for Sarmiento in 2016. He spent the next four years progressing through their youth system, notably finishing as the top scorer at his level in his final two years in it. Gho made the jump into the club's first-team squad in December 2020 under manager Iván Delfino, who resigned after selecting the right midfielder on the bench for three fixtures in Primera B Nacional. His senior debut arrived in Mario Sciacqua's first match, as the new coach subbed him on with five minutes left of a win away to Deportivo Riestra on 28 December.

In June 2025, Gho joined Argentinos Juniors, signing a contract until the end of 2029.

== Personal life ==
Gho's father, Juan Carlos, worked as a technical director; notably for Rivadavia.

== Career statistics ==
As of 4 January 2021.

Appearances and goals by club, season and competition
Club	Season	League			Cup		League Cup		Continental		Other		Total	
Club	Season	Division	Apps	Goals	Apps	Goals	Apps	Goals	Apps	Goals	Apps	Goals	Apps	Goals
Sarmiento	2020	Primera B Nacional	2	0	0	0	—		—		0	0	2	0
Career total			2	0	0	0	—		—		0	0	2	0
