= Alan Lescano =

Argentine footballer

Personal information
- Full name: Alan Hernán Lescano
- Date of birth: 11 November 2001 (age 25)
- Place of birth: San Carlos de Bolívar, Buenos Aires, Argentina
- Height: 1.82 m (6 ft 0 in)
- Position: Midfielder

Team information
- Current team: Vasco da Gama
- Number: 22

Youth career
- Gimnasia LP

Senior career*
Years	Team	Apps	(Gls)
2022–2023	Gimnasia LP	24	(3)
2023–2026	Argentinos Juniors	109	(23)
2026–	Vasco da Gama	2	(1)
- * Club domestic league appearances and goals as of 17:54, 3 October 2026 (UTC)

Alan Hernán Lescano (born 11 November 2001) is an Argentine professional footballer who plays as a midfielder for Campeonato Brasileiro Série A club Vasco da Gama.

== Career ==
Lescano came through the youth system at Gimnasia LP, signing his first contract in April 2022. He made his debut on 30 April in a 6–0 win against Patronato. On 22 February 2023, he scored his first goal in a Copa Argentina game against Excursionistas.

On 31 July 2023, he permanently joined Argentinos Juniors, signing a contract until December 2027. He made his debut on 21 August, coming on as a substitute in the 88th minute for Javier Cabrera.

In September 2026, Lescano was signed by the Brazilian club Vasco da Gama until December 2029. He made his debut on 12 September, coming off the bench in the 73th minute and providing an assist in the 2–1 away win against Grêmio. Lescano scored his first goal in the following match, converting a penalty in the 5–0 victory over Coritiba.

== Career statistics ==
As of 22 December 2025.

Appearances and goals by club, season and competition
Club	Season	League			Cup (Note: Includes Copa Argentina)		Continental		Other		Total	
Club	Season	Division	Apps	Goals	Apps	Goals	Apps	Goals	Apps	Goals	Apps	Goals
Gimnasia LP	2022	Argentine Primera División	4	0	0	0	—		—		4	0
Gimnasia LP	2023	Argentine Primera División	20	3	1	1	5 (Note: Appearances in Copa Sudamericana)	1	—		26	5
Gimnasia LP	Total		24	3	1	1	5	1	0	0	30	5
Argentinos Juniors	2023	Argentine Primera División	9	0	1	0	0	0	—		10	0
Argentinos Juniors	2024	Argentine Primera División	41	11	2	0	2 (Note: Appearances in Copa Sudamericana)	1	—		45	12
Argentinos Juniors	2025	Argentine Primera División	34	7	5	2	—		—		39	9
Argentinos Juniors	Total		84	18	8	2	2	1	0	0	94	21
Career total			108	21	9	3	7	2	0	0	124	26
