= Manuel Insaurralde =

Argentine footballer

Personal information
- Full name: Carlos Manuel Insaurralde
- Date of birth: 31 January 1999 (age 27)
- Place of birth: Formosa, Argentina
- Height: 1.76 m (5 ft 9 1/2 in)
- Position: Central midfielder

Team information
- Current team: San Lorenzo
- Number: 8

Youth career
- 2005–2014: Internacionale de Obrero
- 2014–2015: Boca Unidos
- 2015–2018: San Lorenzo

Senior career*
Years	Team	Apps	(Gls)
2018–	San Lorenzo	46	(1)
2020	→ Universidad Católica (loan)	22	(0)
2021–2022	→ Gimnasia LP (loan)	43	(0)

International career
2019	Argentina U20	5	(0)
- * Club domestic league appearances and goals as of 17:55, 21 November 2026 (UTC)

Carlos Manuel Insaurralde (born 31 January 1999) is an Argentine professional footballer who plays as a central midfielder for San Lorenzo.

== Club career ==
Insaurralde spent his opening youth years with local team Internacionale de Obrero from 2005, prior to joining Boca Unidos' system in 2014. In 2015, following an unsuccessful trial with River Plate, Insaurralde joined San Lorenzo. He was promoted into the club's senior squad three years later, when he was selected for his professional debut on 22 October 2018 against San Martín; featuring for seventy-six minutes of a 2–1 victory.

After eleven appearances, Insaurralde left on loan in January 2020 to Ecuadorian Serie A side Universidad Católica until the end of the year. He participated in twenty-three matches during the 2020 campaign, which included a Copa Sudamericana bow on 12 February against Lanús.

In July 2021, Insaurralde once again left on loan, this time to Gimnasia La Plata on a deal until the end of 2022, with a purchase option for 50% of his card.

== International career ==
In December 2018, Insaurralde was selected by Argentina for the 2019 South American U-20 Championship in Chile. He featured four times as they lost in the final to Ecuador.

== Career statistics ==
As of 2 January 2021.

Club statistics
Club	Season	League			Cup		League Cup		Continental		Other		Total	
Club	Season	Division	Apps	Goals	Apps	Goals	Apps	Goals	Apps	Goals	Apps	Goals	Apps	Goals
San Lorenzo	2018–19	Primera División	7	0	2	0	1	0	0	0	0	0	10	0
San Lorenzo	2019–20	Primera División	1	0	0	0	0	0	—		0	0	1	0
San Lorenzo	2020–21	Primera División	0	0	0	0	0	0	—		0	0	0	0
San Lorenzo	Total		8	0	2	0	1	0	0	0	0	0	11	0
Universidad Católica (loan)	2020	Serie A	22	0	0	0	—		1 (Note: Appearance(s) in the Copa Sudamericana)	0	0	0	23	0
Career total			30	0	2	0	1	0	1	0	0	0	34	0
