= Santiago Rodríguez (footballer, born 1997) =

Argentine footballer

Personal information
- Full name: Santiago Alejandro Rodríguez
- Date of birth: 23 August 1997 (age 29)
- Place of birth: Arizona, San Luis, Argentina
- Height: 1.71 m (5 ft 7 in)
- Position: Centre-forward

Team information
- Current team: Gimnasia Mendoza (on loan from Argentinos Juniors)
- Number: 11

Youth career
- Estudiantes SL

Senior career*
Years	Team	Apps	(Gls)
2015–2020	Estudiantes SL	108	(13)
2020–2023	Almagro	38	(6)
2022	→ Instituto (loan)	39	(8)
2023–2024	Instituto	53	(10)
2024–	Argentinos Juniors	22	(0)
2025	→ Sarmiento (loan)	11	(0)
2026–	→ Gimnasia Mendoza (loan)	11	(1)
- * Club domestic league appearances and goals as of 16:38, 10 May 2026 (UTC)

Santiago Alejandro Rodríguez (born 23 August 1997) is an Argentine professional footballer who plays as a midfielder or centre-forward for Gimnasia Mendoza, on loan from Argentinos Juniors.

== Career ==
Rodríguez came through the youth setup at Estudiantes SL, making his first team debut on 12 May 2015 in the Primera Nacional against Central Córdoba SdE. He scored his first goal later that season against Instituto. On 30 September 2020, he joined Almagro.

On 3 January 2022, he joined Instituto on loan and helped them to promotion to the Liga Profesional. On 15 December, his loan was made permanent as Instituto bought 50% of his rights, signing him to a three-year contract. In March 2024, he extended his contract until December 2026. On May 18, he scored from 40 metres in a 1–1 draw against Unión Santa Fe.

On 29 August 2025, he permanently joined Argentinos Juniors for a fee over $3 million.

On 19 June, he was loaned to Sarmiento.

On 13 January 2026, he was loaned to newly promoted Gimnasia Mendoza. Ahead of joining Gimnasia, he had undergone a goal drought with his last goal coming in 2024. He ended this drought on 25 February, scoring in a 1–1 draw against Independiente.
