= Matías Reali =

Argentine footballer

Personal information
- Full name: Matías Reali
- Date of birth: 14 November 1997 (age 28)
- Place of birth: La Plata, Argentina
- Height: 1.65 m (5 ft 5 in)
- Position: Winger

Team information
- Current team: Independiente Rivadavia
- Number: 80

Youth career
- Gimnasia LP

Senior career*
Years	Team	Apps	(Gls)
2018–2019	Everton de La Plata	8	(3)
2019–2020	Defensores de Cambaceres	9	(4)
2020	Ciclón		
2020–2021	Círculo Deportivo	32	(5)
2021–2022	Altos Hornos Zapla	5	(2)
2022–2024	Gimnasia Jujuy	27	(3)
2023	→ Independiente Rivadavia	31	(2)
2024	Independiente Rivadavia	19	(1)
2024–2026	San Lorenzo	61	(0)
2026–	Independiente Rivadavia	1	(0)
- * Club domestic league appearances and goals as of 18:03, 12 October 2026 (UTC)

Matías Reali (born 14 November 1997) is an Argentine professional footballer who plays as a winger for Independiente Rivadavia.

== Career ==
Reali came through the youth setup at Gimnasia LP, where he stayed until the age of 21, but did not make a senior appearance. After leaving Gimnasia, he spent time in the lower divisions at Everton de La Plata, before joining Villa San Carlos on trial for 15 days. After the trial, he then joined Villa San Carlos' local rivals Defensores de Cambaceres, where he scored 4 goals to become the team's top goalscorer for the season. In 2020, he moved abroad to Bolivia to join Copa Simón Bolívar club Ciclón, coached by Roberto Sosa. The league was suspended due to the COVID-19 pandemic and he moved back to Argentina on 26 October, signing for Círculo Deportivo. In 2021, he played for Altos Hornos Zapla in the Torneo Regional Federal Amateur and his performances secured a move up to the Primera Nacional, signing for Gimnasia Jujuy.

In 2023, he joined Independiente Rivadavia on loan. He scored in the Primera Nacional semi-final against Deportivo Maipú, but received was sent off and was thus suspended for the final, in which Rivadavia beat Almirante Brown to secure promotion to the Liga Profesional. They exercised the buy option of the loan on November 30 for a fee of $200,000. He scored his first Liga Profesional goal on 12 May 2024 in a 2–0 win against Lanús. He was also promoted to the club's captaincy during the 2024 season.

In June 2024, Reali joined San Lorenzo for $1.8 million, after the transfer was initially held up due to a payment dispute. On 3 July, he made his debut in a 2–0 defeat to Progreso in the Rio de la Plata series.
