= Carapachay =

- District
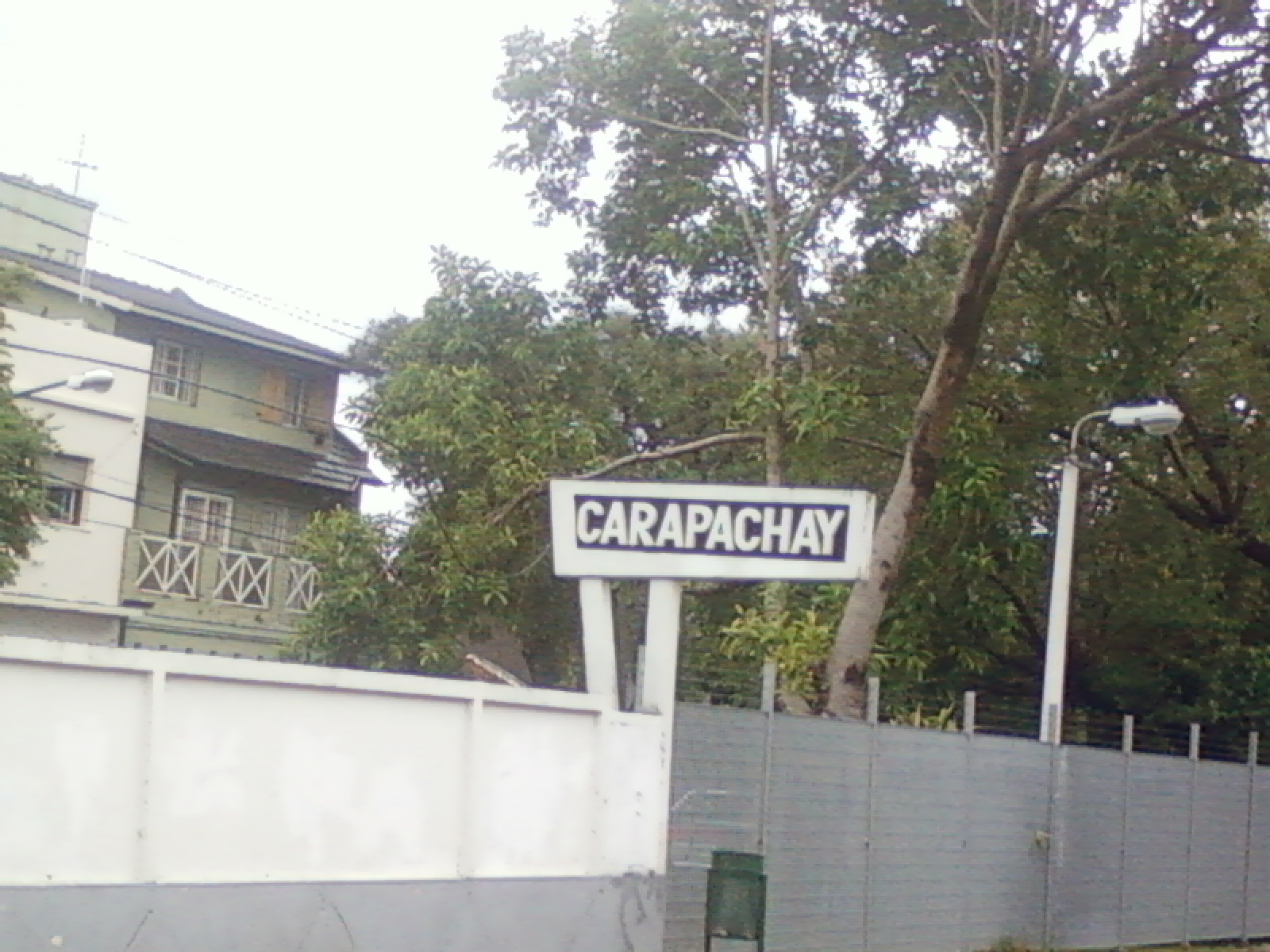
- Carapachay train station.

- Location in Greater Buenos Aires
- Coordinates: 34°31′S 58°32′W
- Country: Argentina
- Province: Buenos Aires
- Partido: Vicente López
- Founded: 1949
- Elevation: 1 m (3.3 ft)

Population (2001 census [INDEC])
  - Total: 15,181
- CPA Base: B 1606
- Area code: +54 11

Carapachay is a town located in Vicente López Partido in Argentina. It forms part of the Greater Buenos Aires agglomeration.

== History ==
In 1909 the Ferrocarril Central Córdoba, which subsequently became the Ferrocarril General Manuel Belgrano, crossed the territory that was to become Carapachay. In 1943 the first train stopped at Parada Km 18, which was renamed Estación Carapachay in 1946. In 1949 the district was officially founded, and in 1964 the name Carapachay was officially recognised.
