= Alan Rodríguez (Uruguayan footballer) =

Uruguayan football player (born 2000)

Personal information
- Full name: Alan Jesús Rodríguez Guaglianoni
- Date of birth: 25 January 2000 (age 26)
- Place of birth: Canelones, Uruguay
- Height: 1.71 m (5 ft 7 in)
- Position: Midfielder

Team information
- Current team: Rosario Central (on loan from Internacional)
- Number: 88

Youth career
- 2011–2019: Defensor Sporting

Senior career*
Years	Team	Apps	(Gls)
2019–2021	Defensor Sporting	50	(6)
2021–2022	Boston River	51	(6)
2022–2025	Argentinos Juniors	64	(5)
2025–	Internacional	27	(0)
2026–	→ Rosario Central (loan)	0	(0)

International career
2017	Uruguay U17	3	(0)
- * Club domestic league appearances and goals as of 17:35, 8 August 2026 (UTC)

Alan Jesús Rodríguez Guaglianoni (born 25 January 2000) is a Uruguayan professional footballer who plays as a midfielder for AFA Liga Profesional de Fútbol club Rosario Central, on loan from Campeonato Brasileiro Série A club Internacional.

== Career ==
He joined the youth set up at Defensor Sporting as an 11 year old. He made his league debut on 17 February, 2019, as a 74 minute substitute for Matías Santos as Defensor Sporting played a home tie against Peñarol at the Estadio Luis Franzini.

In April 2021 after 11 seasons in total with Defensor Sporting in which he had broken into the first team and made 50 appearances, scored 6 goals and given 3 assists, Rodríguez agreed to join Boston River. This came after a reported transfer to Europe with a Belgian club had previously fallen through.

Whilst at Boston River Rodríguez was awarded the club captaincy. After starting 22 of the 24 matches played by Boston River during the 2022 season he was signed by Argentinos Juniors as a replacement for Fausto Vera who himself was moving to Brazilian club Corinthians. A contract for Rodríguez was signed until December 2026 and Boston River negotiated a 50% profit sell on clause in the deal. During his time in Uruguay he had three times been awarded the AUF player of the month; October 2019, November-December 2021, as well as June 2022. After making his debut for Argentinos in August 2022 he explained why he wanted to join the club saying he had been attracted to the move “because of the intensity of Argentine football, much faster, because of its people, the club and its coach”.
