= Alexis Sabella =

Argentine footballer

Personal information
- Full name: Alexis Amadeo Sabella
- Date of birth: 20 June 2001 (age 25)
- Place of birth: Florentino Ameghino, Argentina
- Height: 1.78 m (5 ft 10 in)
- Position: Midfielder

Team information
- Current team: Deportes Puerto Montt
- Number: 18

Youth career
- 2016–2020: San Lorenzo

Senior career*
Years	Team	Apps	(Gls)
2020–2025	San Lorenzo	39	(3)
2022–2023	→ Platense (loan)	22	(1)
2024	→ Colón (loan)	21	(2)
2025	→ Atlanta (loan)	6	(0)
2025	Magallanes	10	(0)
2026–	Deportes Puerto Montt	0	(0)
- * Club domestic league appearances and goals as of 13 January 2026

Alexis Amadeo Sabella (born 20 June 2001) is an Argentine professional footballer who plays as an attacking midfielder or winger for Chilean club Deportes Puerto Montt.

== Career ==
Sabella joined the San Lorenzo youth ranks midway through 2016. He was promoted into their first-team squad four years later, initially as an unused substitute for a Primera División win away to Aldosivi on 1 March 2020. His senior debut eventually arrived on 7 November 2020 against Estudiantes in the Copa de la Liga Profesional, as he came off the bench to replace Lucas Menossi with thirteen minutes left of a 2–0 victory.

After ending his contract with San Lorenzo, Sabella moved to Chile and joined Magallanes in the Liga de Ascenso. The next season, he switched to Deportes Puerto Montt.

== Career statistics ==
As of 8 November 2020.

Appearances and goals by club, season and competition
Club	Season	League			Cup		League Cup		Continental		Other		Total	
Club	Season	Division	Apps	Goals	Apps	Goals	Apps	Goals	Apps	Goals	Apps	Goals	Apps	Goals
San Lorenzo	2019–20	Primera División	0	0	0	0	0	0	—		0	0	0	0
San Lorenzo	2020–21 (Note: Soccerway counts Copa de la Liga Profesional appearances as league appearances.)	Primera División	1	0	0	0	0	0	—		0	0	1	0
Career total			1	0	0	0	0	0	—		0	0	1	0
