= Alex Luna (footballer) =

Argentine professional footballer

Personal information
- Full name: Alex Nahuel Luna
- Date of birth: 31 March 2004 (age 22)
- Place of birth: Rafaela, Argentina
- Height: 1.74 m (5 ft 9 in)
- Position: Attacking midfielder

Team information
- Current team: Instituto
- Number: 10

Youth career
- 9 de Julio
- Rafaela

Senior career*
Years	Team	Apps	(Gls)
2020–2026	Rafaela	80	(3)
2024	→ Independiente (loan)	29	(1)
2025	→ Instituto (loan)	32	(8)
2026–	Instituto	15	(5)

International career
- Argentina U15
- Argentina U17
- * Club domestic league appearances and goals as of 18:07, 10 May 2026 (UTC)

Alex Nahuel Luna (born 31 March 2004) is an Argentine professional footballer who plays as an attacking midfielder for Instituto.

== Club career ==
Luna came through the youth ranks at Atlético de Rafaela, having joined at the age of nine from 9 de Julio. He scored sixteen goals in Rafaela's academy in 2019–20, finishing as their top scorer. He was promoted into the first-team set-up in 2020 under manager Walter Otta, with the midfielder signing his first professional contract on 2 October; penning terms until December 2022, amid interest from clubs from home and abroad. Luna would then make his senior debut at the age of sixteen on 7 December during a Primera B Nacional victory over Tigre, after he replaced Facundo Soloa with eighteen minutes left.

== International career ==
Before his professional debut for Atlético de Rafaela, Luna had already received call-ups from Argentina's U15s and U17s. He won the Vlatko Marković Tournament with the former.

== Personal life ==
Luna is of Spanish descent, through his great-grandmother.

== Career statistics ==
As of 14 December 2020.

Appearances and goals by club, season and competition
Club	Season	League			National cup		League cup		Continental		Other		Total	
Club	Season	Division	Apps	Goals	Apps	Goals	Apps	Goals	Apps	Goals	Apps	Goals	Apps	Goals
Atlético de Rafaela	2020	Primera B Nacional	1	0	0	0	—		—		0	0	1	0
Career total			1	0	0	0	—		—		0	0	1	0

== Honours ==
Argentina U15

- Vlatko Marković Tournament: 2019
