= Gastón Hernández =

Argentine footballer

Personal information
- Full name: Gastón Alan Hernández
- Date of birth: 19 January 1998 (age 28)
- Place of birth: San Rafael, Mendoza, Argentina
- Height: 1.85 m (6 ft 1 in)
- Position: Centre-back

Team information
- Current team: San Lorenzo
- Number: 33

Youth career
- Huracán San Rafael
- 2016–2019: San Lorenzo

Senior career*
| Years | Team | Apps | (Gls) |
| 2019– | San Lorenzo | 101 | (4) |
| 2020–2021 | → San Martín SJ (loan) | 20 | (0) |
- * Club domestic league appearances and goals as of 17:20, 4 June 2026 (UTC)

Gastón Alan Hernández (born 19 January 1998) is an Argentine professional footballer who plays as a centre-back for San Lorenzo.

== Career ==
Born in San Rafael, Hernández started his career with Huracán de San Rafael in the Torneo Argentino B. In 2016, aged 18, he joined the San Lorenzo youth setup, signing his first professional contract in 2019. In 2020, he was loaned out to Primera Nacional side San Martín SJ until the end of 2021, where he made his debut on 29 November against Nueva Chicago. However, his loan was interrupted by an ACL injury.

He returned to San Lorenzo in 2022, making his first team debut on 16 April against Platense. He scored his first goal on 17 August in a 2–0 win over Platense. In 2023, he captained the side for the first time in a game against Belgrano. On 18 November, he signed a new contract until the end of 2024. On 23 January 2024, San Lorenzo announced his sale of 85% of his economic rights to Super League Greece club Olympiacos for $4 million. Four days later, however, the transfer fell through. He suffered another ruptured ACL in a game against Platense on 10 March 2024. He made his first team return on 14 February 2025, coming 341 days after the injury. In December 2025, he signed a new contract until the end of 2027 with a release clause of $10 million.

== Career statistics ==
As of 19 January 2026

Appearances and goals by club, season and competition
| Club | Season | League | | | Cup (Note: Includes Copa Argentina) | | Continental | | Other | | Total | |
| Club | Season | Division | Goals | Apps | Apps | Goals | Apps | Goals | Apps | Goals | Apps | Goals |
|---|---|---|---|---|---|---|---|---|---|---|---|---|
| San Martín SJ | 2020 | Primera Nacional | 9 | 0 | 2 | 0 | — | | — | | 11 | 0 |
| San Martín SJ | 2021 | Primera Nacional | 11 | 0 | — | | — | | — | | 11 | 0 |
| San Martín SJ | Total | | 20 | 0 | 2 | 0 | 0 | 0 | 0 | 0 | 22 | 0 |
| San Lorenzo | 2022 | AFA Liga Profesional de Fútbol | 24 | 1 | — | | — | | — | | 24 | 1 |
| San Lorenzo | 2023 | AFA Liga Profesional de Fútbol | 35 | 2 | 5 | 0 | 8 (Note: Appearances in Copa Sudamericana) | 0 | — | | 48 | 2 |
| San Lorenzo | 2024 | AFA Liga Profesional de Fútbol | 8 | 0 | — | | — | | — | | 8 | 0 |
| San Lorenzo | 2025 | AFA Liga Profesional de Fútbol | 25 | 1 | 2 | 0 | — | | — | | 27 | 1 |
| San Lorenzo | Total | | 92 | 4 | 7 | 0 | 8 | 0 | 0 | 0 | 107 | 4 |
| Career total | | | 112 | 4 | 9 | 0 | 8 | 0 | 0 | 0 | 131 | 4 |
