= Andrés Vombergar =

Slovenian footballer (born 1994)

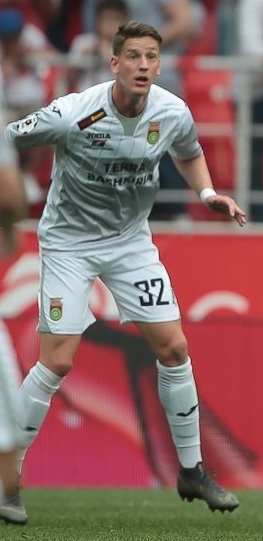
- Vombergar with Ufa in 2019

Personal information
- Date of birth: 20 November 1994 (age 31)
- Place of birth: Villa Luzuriaga, Argentina
- Height: 1.88 m (6 ft 2 in)
- Position: Forward

Team information
- Current team: Aldosivi
- Number: 29

Youth career
- River Plate

Senior career*
Years	Team	Apps	(Gls)
2014–2015	Ituzaingó	15	(7)
2015–2017	Fénix	57	(14)
2016–2017	→ Los Andes (loan)	36	(13)
2017–2019	Olimpija Ljubljana	32	(14)
2019–2020	Ufa	28	(2)
2020–2021	Olimpija Ljubljana	33	(11)
2021–2022	Atlético San Luis	22	(2)
2022–2023	San Lorenzo	36	(11)
2023–2024	Ittihad Kalba	23	(8)
2024–2025	San Lorenzo	40	(8)
2026–	Aldosivi	12	(7)

International career
2019	Slovenia B	1	(1)
2022–2025	Slovenia	5	(1)
- * Club domestic league appearances and goals as of 17:52, 6 November 2026 (UTC)

Andrés Vombergar (born 20 November 1994) is a professional footballer who plays as a forward for Aldosivi. Born in Argentina, he represented the Slovenia national team internationally.

== Early life ==
Vombergar was born in Argentina to Slovenian parents and grew up bilingual.

== Club career ==
Vombergar began his senior career with Ituzaingó in 2014. In early 2015, he moved to Fénix, where he played for two seasons and scored a total of 14 league goals. In 2016, Vombergar was loaned to Los Andes.

On 28 July 2017, Vombergar signed a contract with Slovenian club Olimpija Ljubljana. In February 2019, Vombergar signed a three-and-a-half-year contract with the Russian team Ufa.

On 14 September 2020, Ufa announced his return to Olimpija. In July 2021, Vombergar joined Mexican side Atlético San Luis, reportedly for a transfer fee of €300,000.

In July 2022, Vombergar joined San Lorenzo on a contract until 31 December 2023.

On 25 June 2023, Emirati club Ittihad Kalba announced the signing of Vombergar, after rescinding his contract with San Lorenzo.

On 19 July 2024, Vombergar returned to San Lorenzo, signing a contract until December 2025.

== International career ==
A Slovene Argentine, Vombergar was eligible to play for either Argentina or Slovenia at international level, and chose to represent the latter. He debuted with the Slovenia senior team on 17 November 2022 in a friendly match against Romania, ending in a 2–1 victory.

== Career statistics ==
=== Club ===
As of 18 April 2025

Appearances and goals by club, season and competition
Club	Season	League			National cup (Note: Includes Copa Argentina, Slovenian Cup)		Continental (Note: Includes UEFA Europa League, Copa Sudamericana, Copa Libertadores)		Other (Note: Includes Russian relegation play-offs, UAE League Cup)		Total	
Club	Season	Division	Apps	Goals	Apps	Goals	Apps	Goals	Apps	Goals	Apps	Goals
Fénix	2015	Primera B Metropolitana	38	10	1	0	—		—		39	10
Fénix	2016	Primera B Metropolitana	19	4	0	0	—		—		19	4
Fénix	Total		57	14	1	0	0	0	0	0	58	14
Los Andes (loan)	2016–17	Primera Nacional	36	13	0	0	—		—		36	13
Olimpija Ljubljana	2017–18	Slovenian PrvaLiga	16	4	1	0	—		—		17	4
Olimpija Ljubljana	2018–19	Slovenian PrvaLiga	16	10	1	1	0	0	—		17	11
Olimpija Ljubljana	Total		32	14	2	1	0	0	0	0	34	15
Ufa	2018–19	Russian Premier League	11	1	0	0	—		2	0	13	1
Ufa	2019–20	Russian Premier League	14	1	1	0	—		—		15	1
Ufa	2020–21	Russian Premier League	3	0	0	0	—		—		3	0
Ufa	Total		28	2	1	0	0	0	2	0	31	2
Olimpija Ljubljana	2020–21	Slovenian PrvaLiga	33	11	3	2	1	1	—		37	14
Atlético San Luis	2021–22	Liga MX	22	2	—		—		—		22	2
San Lorenzo	2022	Primera División	17	6	0	0	—		—		17	6
San Lorenzo	2023	Primera División	19	5	1	0	5	0	—		25	5
San Lorenzo	Total		36	11	1	0	5	0	0	0	42	11
Kalba	2023–24	UAE Pro League	23	8	0	0	—		6	2	29	10
San Lorenzo	2024	Primera División	18	1	1	0	1	0	—		20	1
San Lorenzo	2025	Primera División	13	7	1	0	—		—		14	7
San Lorenzo	Total		31	8	2	0	1	0	0	0	34	8
Career total			298	83	10	3	7	1	8	2	323	89

=== International ===
Appearances and goals by national team and year
National team	Year	Apps	Goals
Slovenia
Slovenia	2022	1	0
Slovenia	2023	1	0
Slovenia	2024	1	0
Slovenia	2025	2	1
Total		5	1

Scores and results list Slovenia's goal tally first, score column indicates score after each Vombergar goal.

List of international goals scored by Andrés Vombergar
No.	Date	Venue	Opponent	Score	Result	Competition
1	10 June 2025	Stadion Z'dežele, Celje, Slovenia	Bosnia and Herzegovina	2–0	2–1	Friendly

== Honours ==
Olimpija Ljubljana

- Slovenian PrvaLiga: 2017–18
- Slovenian Cup: 2017–18, 2020–21
