= Alexis Cuello =

Argentine footballer

Personal information
- Full name: Alexis Ricardo Cuello
- Date of birth: 18 February 2000 (age 26)
- Place of birth: Dock Sud, Argentina
- Height: 1.70 m (5 ft 7 in)
- Position: Forward

Team information
- Current team: San Lorenzo
- Number: 9

Youth career
- Racing Club

Senior career*
Years	Team	Apps	(Gls)
2019–2023	Racing Club	0	(0)
2019–2020	→ Barracas Central (loan)	5	(0)
2020–2021	→ Instituto (loan)	24	(2)
2023–2025	Almagro	33	(7)
2024	→ San Lorenzo (loan)	28	(4)
2025–	San Lorenzo	65	(12)
- * Club domestic league appearances and goals as of 17:56, 21 November 2026 (UTC)

Alexis Ricardo Cuello (born 18 February 2000) is an Argentine footballer currently playing as a forward for San Lorenzo.

== Career statistics ==
=== Club ===
As of 26 January 2025.

Club	Division	League			Cup		Continental		Total	
Club	Division	Season	Apps	Goals	Apps	Goals	Apps	Goals	Apps	Goals
Barracas Central	Primera B Nacional	2019-20	5	0	—		—		5	0
Instituto	Primera B Nacional	2020	4	1	—		—		4	1
Instituto	Primera B Nacional	2021	20	1	—		—		20	1
Instituto	Total		24	2	0	0	0	0	24	2
Almagro	Primera B Nacional	2023	33	7	2	1	—		35	8
San Lorenzo	Primera División	2024	26	4	4	1	6	3	36	8
San Lorenzo	Primera División	2025	1	0	—		—		1	0
San Lorenzo	Total		27	4	4	1	6	3	37	8
Career total			89	13	6	2	6	3	101	18
