= Nicolás Tripichio =

Argentine footballer

Personal information
- Full name: Nicolás Martín Tripichio
- Date of birth: 5 January 1996 (age 30)
- Place of birth: Buenos Aires, Argentina
- Height: 1.75 m (5 ft 9 in)
- Position: Right-back

Team information
- Current team: San Lorenzo
- Number: 24

Youth career
- 2003–2015: Vélez Sarsfield

Senior career*
Years	Team	Apps	(Gls)
2015–2018	Vélez Sarsfield	28	(1)
2018–2024	Defensa y Justicia	126	(9)
2020	→ Guaraní (loan)	3	(0)
2024–	San Lorenzo	73	(2)

International career
2011	Argentina U-15	7	(0)
2013	Argentina U-17	15	(0)
2015	Argentina U-20	12	(0)
- * Club domestic league appearances and goals as of 18:03, 21 November 2026 (UTC)

Nicolás Martín Tripichio (born 5 January 1996) is an Argentine footballer who plays as a right-back for San Lorenzo in the Argentine Primera División.

== Club career ==
Under Miguel Ángel Russo's coaching, Tripichio debuted professionally for Vélez Sarsfield in a 1–1 draw with Newell's Old Boys, in the 2015 Argentine Primera División. Although he mostly plays as a right full back, in that game he played as a left winger.

== International career ==
Under Miguel Ángel Lemme's coaching, Tripichio took part of the Argentina national under-15 football team that finished third in the 2011 South American Under-15 Football Championship.

In 2013, the defender took part of the squad of the Argentina national under-17 football team that won the South American Under-17 Football Championship at home, under Humberto Grondona's coaching.

He also took part of the 2013 FIFA U-17 World Cup. Tripichio also won with the Argentina national under-20 football team the 2015 South American Youth Football Championship.

== Honours ==
Defensa y Justicia

- Copa Sudamericana (1): 2020
- Recopa Sudamericana (1): 2021

Argentina U-17

- South American Under-17 Football Championship (1): 2013

Argentina U-20

- South American Youth Football Championship (1): 2015
