= Estadio Pedro Bidegain =

Football stadium in Buenos Aires, Argentina

Coordinates: 34°39′7″S 58°26′24″W

Pedro Bidegain Stadium
- Estadio Pedro Bidegain
- Nuevo Gasómetro

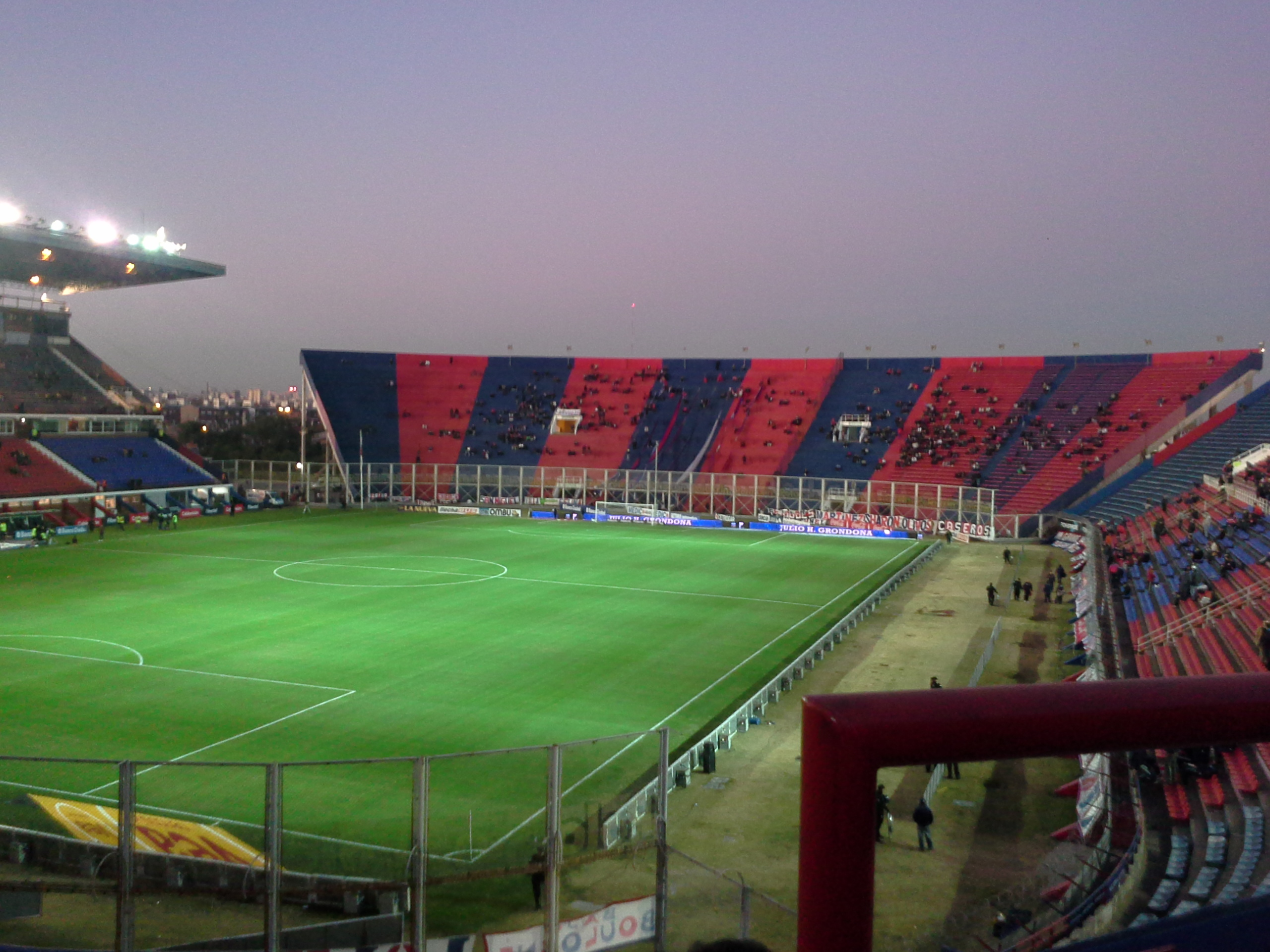
- View of the stadium in 2015
- Interactive map of Pedro Bidegain Stadium
- Full name: Estadio Pedro Bidegain
- Address: Av. Perito Moreno 2145; Buenos Aires; Argentina
- Owner: San Lorenzo
- Capacity: 47,964; 31,814 (international)
- Surface: Grass
- Field size: 110 x 70 m

Construction
- Opened: 16 December 1993; 32 years ago

Tenant
- San Lorenzo (1995–present)

Website
- sanlorenzo.com.ar/nuevogasometro

Nuevo Gasómetro (Spanish pronunciation: [nweβo gaˈsometɾo]; lit. 'New Gasometer', named after the club's former venue, El Gasómetro), officially known as Pedro Bidegain Stadium (Spanish: Estadio Pedro Bidegain, pronounced [estaðjo ˈpeðɾo βiðeˈɣajn]; named after the club's former president Pedro Bidegain) is an association football stadium in Buenos Aires, Argentina. Located in the southern part of the Flores district, it is the home of San Lorenzo.

== History ==
After playing their home games in other stadiums, the Nuevo Gasómetro was inaugurated in a friendly match v Chilean club Universidad Católica. The first official match held in the stadium was San Lorenzo 1 v Belgrano (C) 0.

The stadium was named after Pedro Bidegain, president of the club between 1929 and 1930. The stadium has the bigger field of Argentina, measuring 110 x 70 meters.

Since its inauguration, the stadium has been refurbished several times, starting in 1997 with the construction of new grandstands on its sides. In 2014, the lighting was completely renovated.

== Sporting events ==
The Pedro Bidegain stadium has not been a current venue for matches of national football teams, with only three games hosted there. National sides to have played at Pedro Bidegain were Bolivia, Colombia, Senegal, and Jordan.

== Return to Boedo ==
San Lorenzo fans wish to return to their original home (Viejo Gasómetro), and won a court action saying that supermarket chain Carrefour should sell back the land that their supermarket is now built on. In July 2019, the club took ownership of the land where the Viejo Gasómetro stood.

== See also ==
- List of football stadiums in Argentina
- Lists of stadiums
