= 2026 Copa Argentina =

Tournament details
- Country: Argentina
- Dates: 18 January – 2 December 2026
- Teams: 64
- 2027 Copa Libertadores: Platense

Tournament statistics
- Matches played: 62
- Goals scored: 156 (2.52 per match)
- Top goal scorer(s): Guido Carrillo; Tomás Fernández; Nicolás Laméndola; Adrián Martínez; Enner Valencia (3 goals each)
- All statistics correct as of 14 November 2026.

The 2026 Copa Argentina (officially the Copa Argentina AXION energy 2026 for sponsorship reasons) is the sixteenth edition of the Copa Argentina, and the fourteenth since the relaunch of the tournament in 2011. The competition began on 18 January and will end on 2 December 2026. Independiente Rivadavia were the defending champions, but they were eliminated in the quarterfinals.

The tournament final will be played between Boca Juniors and Platense. Since Boca Juniors qualified for the 2027 Copa Libertadores by winning the 2026 Copa Sudamericana, Platense also secured a spot in the tournament—a spot awarded to the Copa Argentina champions, regardless of whether they finish first or second.

== Teams ==
The 64 teams that take part in this competition include: all thirty teams from the Primera División; fifteen teams of the Primera Nacional; five from the Primera B, four from the Primera C, and ten teams from Federal A.

=== First Level ===
==== Primera División ====
All thirty teams of the 2025 tournament qualified.

- Aldosivi
- Argentinos Juniors
- Atlético Tucumán
- Banfield
- Barracas Central
- Belgrano
- Boca Juniors
- Central Córdoba (SdE)
- Defensa y Justicia
- Deportivo Riestra
- Estudiantes (LP)
- Gimnasia y Esgrima (LP)
- Godoy Cruz
- Huracán
- Independiente
- Independiente Rivadavia^{TH}
- Instituto
- Lanús
- Newell's Old Boys
- Platense
- Racing
- River Plate
- Rosario Central
- San Lorenzo
- San Martín (SJ)
- Sarmiento (J)
- Talleres (C)
- Tigre
- Unión
- Vélez Sarsfield

=== Second Level ===
==== Primera Nacional ====
The top 7 teams in each group plus the best eighth-placed one of the 2025 tournament qualified.

- Agropecuario Argentino
- Atlanta
- Chaco For Ever
- Deportivo Madryn
- Deportivo Maipú
- Deportivo Morón
- Estudiantes (BA)
- Estudiantes (RC)
- Gimnasia y Esgrima (J)
- Gimnasia y Esgrima (M)
- Gimnasia y Tiro
- San Martín (T)
- San Miguel
- Temperley
- Tristán Suárez

=== Third Level ===
==== Primera B Metropolitana ====
The champions, the winners of the "Torneo Reducido" and the top three teams of the 2025 Primera B tournament qualified.

- Acassuso
- Argentino (M)
- Deportivo Armenio
- Midland
- Real Pilar

==== Torneo Federal A ====
The top five teams of each zone from the Second Stage of the 2025 tournament qualified.

- Argentino (MM)
- Atenas (RC)
- Atlético de Rafaela
- Ciudad de Bolivar
- Deportivo Rincón
- Gimnasia y Esgrima (Ch)
- Olimpo
- San Martín (F)
- Sarmiento (LB)
- Sportivo Belgrano

=== Fourth Level ===
==== Primera C Metropolitana ====
The champions, the runners-up, the winners of the "Torneo Reducido" and the winners of the "Torneo Reducido" additional tournament of the 2025 Primera C tournament qualified.

- Claypole
- Deportivo Camioneros
- Ituzaingó
- Sportivo Barracas

== Round and draw dates ==
Phase	Round	Draw date	Dates
Final stage	Round of 64	10 December 2025	18 January–15 April 2026
Final stage	Round of 32	10 December 2025	22 April–17 July 2026
Final stage	Round of 16	10 December 2025	12 August–2 September 2026
Final stage	Quarterfinals	10 December 2025	9 September–1 October 2026
Final stage	Semifinals	10 December 2025	28 October–14 November 2026
Final stage	Final	10 December 2025	2 December 2026

== Final rounds ==
=== Draw ===
The draw for the finals rounds was held on 10 December 2025, 13:00 at the AFA Futsal Stadium in Ezeiza. The 64 qualified teams were divided into six groups. The Big Five and Huracán were paired and placed directly in Group 1. The other historical rivals that play in the Argentine First Division were paired and placed in Groups 2 and 3. The Torneo Federal and Primera Nacional teams were placed directly in Groups 4 and 6, respectively, while Primera B Metropolitana and Primera C Metropolitana were placed in Group 5. From Group 1 to Group 3, the first team drawn was placed in a predetermined bracket and its historical rival was placed in the other. The matches were drawn from the respective confronts: Group 1 vs. Group 4; Group 2 vs. Group 5 and Group 3 vs. Group 6. With this draw format, historical rivals could only play against each other in the final.

Group 1		Group 6	
Boca Juniors; Independiente; Huracán	River Plate; Racing; San Lorenzo	Agropecuario Argentino; Atlanta; Chaco For Ever; Deportivo Madryn; Deportivo Maipú; Deportivo Morón; Estudiantes (BA); Gimnasia y Esgrima (J); Gimnasia y Tiro; San Martín (T); San Miguel; Temperley; Tristán Suárez	
Group 2		Agropecuario Argentino; Atlanta; Chaco For Ever; Deportivo Madryn; Deportivo Maipú; Deportivo Morón; Estudiantes (BA); Gimnasia y Esgrima (J); Gimnasia y Tiro; San Martín (T); San Miguel; Temperley; Tristán Suárez	
Estudiantes (LP); Newell's Old Boys; Argentinos Juniors; Vélez Sarsfield; Banfield; Belgrano	Gimnasia y Esgrima (LP); Rosario Central; Platense; Tigre; Lanús; Talleres (C)	Agropecuario Argentino; Atlanta; Chaco For Ever; Deportivo Madryn; Deportivo Maipú; Deportivo Morón; Estudiantes (BA); Gimnasia y Esgrima (J); Gimnasia y Tiro; San Martín (T); San Miguel; Temperley; Tristán Suárez	
Group 3		Group 4	Group 5
Gimnasia y Esgrima (M); Barracas Central; Atlético Tucumán; Aldosivi; Instituto; Unión; Godoy Cruz	Independiente Rivadavia; Deportivo Riestra; Central Córdoba (SdE); Sarmiento (J); Estudiantes (RC); Defensa y Justicia; San Martín (SJ)	Argentino (MM); Atenas (RC); Atlético de Rafaela; Ciudad de Bolivar; Deportivo Rincón; Gimnasia y Esgrima (Ch); Olimpo; San Martín (F); Sarmiento (LB); Sportivo Belgrano	Acassuso; Argentino (M); Deportivo Armenio; Midland; Real Pilar; Claypole; Deportivo Camioneros; Ituzaingó; Sportivo Barracas

=== Bracket ===
==== Upper bracket ====
Round of 64
San Lorenzo	5
Deportivo Rincón	0
Deportivo Riestra	1
Deportivo Maipú	0
Newell's Old Boys	0
Acassuso	2
Gimnasia y Esgrima (LP)	4
Deportivo Camioneros	1
Banfield	3
Real Pilar	0
Estudiantes (RC)	0 (3)
San Martín (T) (p)	0 (4)
Godoy Cruz	0
Deportivo Morón	1
Argentinos Juniors	1 (5)
Midland (p)	1 (6)
Racing	1
San Martín (F)	0
Defensa y Justicia	2
Chaco For Ever	1
Central Córdoba (SdE)	2 (4)
Gimnasia y Esgrima (J) (p)	2 (5)
Belgrano	3
Atlético de Rafaela	0
Vélez Sarsfield	4
Deportivo Armenio	1
Gimnasia y Esgrima (M)	0 (3)
Gimnasia y Tiro (p)	0 (4)
Sarmiento (J)	1
Tristán Suárez	0
Boca Juniors	2
Gimnasia y Esgrima (Ch)	0

Round of 32
San Lorenzo	1 (4)
Deportivo Riestra (p)	1 (5)
Acassuso	0
Gimnasia y Esgrima (LP)	3
Banfield (p)	1 (5)
San Martín (T)	1 (4)
Deportivo Morón	1
Midland	2
Racing	4
Defensa y Justicia	1
Gimnasia y Esgrima (J)	2 (2)
Belgrano (p)	2 (4)
Vélez Sarsfield	2
Gimnasia y Tiro	0
Sarmiento (J)	0
Boca Juniors	2

Round of 16
Deportivo Riestra (p)	1 (4)
Gimnasia y Esgrima (LP)	1 (2)
Banfield (p)	2 (4)
Midland	2 (3)
Racing	1
Belgrano	0
Vélez Sarsfield	0 (3)
Boca Juniors (p)	0 (4)

Quarterfinals
Deportivo Riestra	1 (6)
Banfield (p)	1 (7)
Racing	2
Boca Juniors	3

Semifinals
Banfield	0
Boca Juniors	3

==== Lower bracket ====
Round of 64
River Plate	1
Ciudad de Bolivar	0
Aldosivi	3
San Miguel	0
Independiente Rivadavia	2
Estudiantes (BA)	0
Tigre	2
Claypole	0
Talleres (C)	2
Argentino (M)	0
Atlético Tucumán	2
Sportivo Barracas	1
Unión	2
Agropecuario Argentino	0
Independiente	4
Atenas (RC)	2
Platense	1
Argentino (MM)	0
San Martín (SJ)	2
Deportivo Madryn	0
Instituto	2
Atlanta	0
Lanús	4
Sarmiento (LB)	1
Estudiantes (LP)	4
Ituzaingó	0
Rosario Central	2
Sportivo Belgrano	0
Barracas Central (p)	2 (4)
Temperley	2 (3)
Huracán	2
Olimpo	1

Round of 32
River Plate	1
Aldosivi	3
Independiente Rivadavia	1
Tigre	0
Talleres (C)	0
Atlético Tucumán	3
Unión	0
Independiente	2
Platense (p)	0 (4)
San Martín (SJ)	0 (3)
Instituto	2
Lanús	1
Estudiantes (LP)	3
Rosario Central	0
Barracas Central	1
Huracán	0

Round of 16
Aldosivi	0
Independiente Rivadavia	2
Atlético Tucumán	4
Independiente	0
Platense (p)	1 (3)
Instituto	1 (1)
Estudiantes (LP)	3
Barracas Central	1

Quarterfinals
Independiente Rivadavia	1 (2)
Atlético Tucumán (p)	1 (3)
Platense	1
Estudiantes (LP)	0

Semifinals
Atlético Tucumán	1 (4)
Platense (p)	1 (5)

=== Round of 64 ===
The Round of 64 had 10 qualified teams from the Torneo Federal A, 9 qualified teams from the Metropolitan Zone (5 teams from Primera B Metropolitana and 4 teams from Primera C Metropolitana), 15 teams from Primera Nacional and 30 teams from Primera División. The round was played in a single knock-out match format between 18 January and 15 April 2026. The 32 winning teams advanced to the Round of 32.

20 March 2026	San Lorenzo	5–0	Deportivo Rincón	Quilmes, Pcia. de Buenos Aires
21:15	Corujo 21'; Vietto 39'; Herrera 43' (o.g.); Cuello 79'; Reali 85'	Report		Stadium: Centenario Ciudad de Quilmes; Referee: Álvaro Carranza

29 March 2026	Huracán	2–1	Olimpo	Caseros, Pcia. de Buenos Aires
18:00	Romero 21'; Blondel 61'	Report	Coacci 36'	Stadium: Ciudad de Caseros; Referee: Yael Falcón Pérez

17 February 2026	River Plate	1–0	Ciudad de Bolivar	Villa Mercedes, Pcia. de San Luis
22:00	Quintero 86' (pen.)	Report		Stadium: Único de Villa Mercedes; Referee: Nicolás Ramírez

24 February 2026	Boca Juniors	2–0	Gimnasia y Esgrima (Ch)	Salta, Pcia. de Salta
21:15	Bareiro 40', 57'	Report		Stadium: Padre Ernesto Martearena; Referee: Facundo Tello

28 March 2026	Racing	1–0	San Martín (F)	Banfield, Pcia. de Buenos Aires
21:15	A. Martínez 34'	Report		Stadium: Florencio Sola; Referee: Andrés Gariano

27 March 2026	Independiente	4–2	Atenas (RC)	Florencio Varela, Pcia. de Buenos Aires
17:00	F. Valdez 20'; Pussetto 37'; Cabral 41'; Tempone 70'	Report	Quiroga 90'; Rivadero 90+1'	Stadium: Norberto "Tito" Tomaghello; Referee: Fernando Espinoza

4 February 2026	Platense	1–0	Argentino (MM)	Caseros, Pcia. de Buenos Aires
21:15	Cuesta 90'	Report		Stadium: Ciudad de Caseros; Referee: Juan Pablo Loustau

21 January 2026	Argentinos Juniors	1–1 (5–6 p)	Midland	Lanús, Pcia. de Buenos Aires
21:15	Lescano 22'	Report	Campana 55'	Stadium: Ciudad de Lanús – Néstor Díaz Pérez; Referee: Luis Lobo Medina
	Penalties
	Lescano (penalty scored); Lozano (penalty scored); Mac Allister (penalty scored); Álvarez (penalty scored); Fernández (penalty missed); Ramírez (penalty scored); Infantino (penalty missed); Porcel (penalty missed)		(penalty scored) Roseti; (penalty scored) Vico; (penalty scored) Cao; (penalty missed) Díaz Laharque; (penalty scored) Porro; (penalty scored) Cepeda; (penalty missed) Violini; (penalty scored) Leguiza

25 March 2026	Banfield	3–0	Real Pilar	Turdera, Pcia. de Buenos Aires
21:15	Perrotta 29', 36'; Anselmo 82'	Report		Stadium: Alfredo Beranger; Referee: Leandro Rey Hilfer

18 January 2026	Lanús	4–1	Sarmiento (LB)	Caseros, Pcia. de Buenos Aires
21:15	Moreno 43' (pen.), 73'; Castillo 61'; Guzmán 85' (o.g.)	Report	Roldán 58'	Stadium: Ciudad de Caseros; Referee: Bruno Amiconi

4 February 2026	Talleres (C)	2–0	Argentino (M)	Rosario, Pcia. de Santa Fe
19:00	Baroni 89'; Depietri 90+7'	Report		Stadium: Marcelo Bielsa; Referee: Maximiliano Macheroni

27 March 2026	Belgrano	3–0	Atlético de Rafaela	Villa Mercedes, Pcia. de San Luis
22:15	Rigoni 35'; Gutiérrez 72' (pen.); Passerini 90+2' (pen.)	Report		Stadium: Único de Villa Mercedes; Referee: Jorge Baliño

7 April 2026	Vélez Sarsfield	4–1	Deportivo Armenio	Sarandí, Pcia. de Buenos Aires
18:30	Quirós 12'; Andrada 31', 68'; Godoy 44'	Report	Dávila 71'	Stadium: Julio Humberto Grondona; Referee: Pablo Giménez

17 February 2026	Tigre	2–0	Claypole	Morón, Pcia. de Buenos Aires
19:45	Arias 57'; Romero 90+5'	Report		Stadium: Nuevo Francisco Urbano; Referee: Julio Barraza

19 January 2026	Estudiantes (LP)	4–0	Ituzaingó	Banfield, Pcia. de Buenos Aires
21:15	Gayoso 52' (o.g.); Castro 59'; Farías 62'; Carrillo 87'	Report		Stadium: Florencio Sola; Referee: Daniel Zamora

9 April 2026	Gimnasia y Esgrima (LP)	4–1	Deportivo Camioneros	Banfield, Pcia. de Buenos Aires
21:00	M. Torres 6' (pen.); Steimbach 30'; Zalazar 65'; Fernández 70'	Report	Aguirre 12'	Stadium: Florencio Sola; Referee: Maximiliano Macheroni

29 March 2026	Newell's Old Boys	0–2	Acassuso	Rafaela, Pcia. de Santa Fe
20:15		Report	Schlotthauer 21'; Petillo 74'	Stadium: Nuevo Monumental; Referee: Pablo Echavarría

11 February 2026	Rosario Central	2–0	Sportivo Belgrano	Santa Fe, Pcia. de Santa Fe
19:00	J. Fernández 5'; Véliz 40'	Report		Stadium: 15 de Abril; Referee: Leandro Rey Hilfer

18 January 2026	Independiente Rivadavia	2–0	Estudiantes (BA)	Villa Mercedes, Pcia. de San Luis
19:00	Arce 23'; Ríos 71'	Report		Stadium: Único de Villa Mercedes; Referee: Sebastián Zunino

15 April 2026	Gimnasia y Esgrima (M)	0–0 (3–4 p)	Gimnasia y Tiro	Lomas de Zamora, Pcia. de Buenos Aires
14:10		Report		Stadium: Eduardo Gallardón; Referee: Nahuel Viñas
	Penalties
	Cortez (penalty missed); Cingolani (penalty missed); Recalde (penalty scored); Ceballos (penalty missed); Módica (penalty scored); Rodríguez (penalty scored); Mondino (penalty missed)		(penalty scored) Contín; (penalty missed) Sivetti; (penalty missed) Guanini; (penalty scored) Villarreal; (penalty missed) W. Montoya; (penalty scored) Rojas; (penalty scored) Galetto

11 February 2026	Central Córdoba (SdE)	2–2 (4–5 p)	Gimnasia y Esgrima (J)	Salta, Pcia. de Salta
21:15	Iacobellis 15'; Vera 53'	Report	Casa 35'; Cachi 48'	Stadium: Padre Ernesto Martearena; Referee: Andrés Gariano
	Penalties
	Santos (penalty scored); Iacobellis (penalty missed); Aguerre (penalty scored); Vera (penalty scored); Maciel (penalty scored)		(penalty scored) Lazarte; (penalty scored) Cachi; (penalty scored) Paradela; (penalty scored) Gallardo; (penalty scored) López

25 March 2026	Atlético Tucumán	2–1	Sportivo Barracas	Caseros, Pcia. de Buenos Aires
19:00	Díaz 20'; Ferreira 87'	Report	Gómez 80'	Stadium: Ciudad de Caseros; Referee: Sebastián Martínez

1 April 2026	Instituto	2–0	Atlanta	Rafaela, Pcia. de Santa Fe
21:15	Galeano 20' (o.g.); Luna 88'	Report		Stadium: Nuevo Monumental; Referee: Bruno Amiconi

7 April 2026	Estudiantes (RC)	0–0 (3–4 p)	San Martín (T)	Córdoba, Pcia. de Córdoba
16:00		Report		Stadium: El Gigante de Alberdi; Referee: Yamil Possi
	Penalties
	Ferreira (penalty scored); Valiente (penalty scored); Morro (penalty scored); Ostchega (penalty missed); Lozano (penalty missed)		(penalty scored) Briñone; (penalty scored) K. López; (penalty scored) Cisnero; (penalty scored) García

25 February 2026	Godoy Cruz	0–1	Deportivo Morón	Victoria, Pcia. de Buenos Aires
21:15		Report	Contreras 26'	Stadium: José Dellagiovanna; Referee: Pablo Giménez

25 February 2026	San Martín (SJ)	2–0	Deportivo Madryn	Caseros, Pcia. de Buenos Aires
17:00	Monje 46'; Murillo 90+3'	Report		Stadium: Ciudad de Caseros; Referee: Juan Pafundi

30 March 2026	Unión	2–0	Agropecuario Argentino	Rosario, Pcia. de Santa Fe
21:15	Tarragona 45+1', 90+4'	Report		Stadium: Marcelo Bielsa; Referee: Sebastián Zunino

1 April 2026	Defensa y Justicia	2–1	Chaco For Ever	Banfield, Pcia. de Buenos Aires
19:00	Molinas 25'; Hausch 36'	Report	Enríquez 16'	Stadium: Florencio Sola; Referee: Daniel Zamora

8 April 2026	Sarmiento (J)	1–0	Tristán Suárez	Sarandí, Pcia. de Buenos Aires
21:10	Magnín 90+4'	Report		Stadium: Julio Humberto Grondona; Referee: Gonzalo Pereira

17 February 2026	Aldosivi	3–0	San Miguel	Florencio Varela, Pcia. de Buenos Aires
17:00	Novillo 23'; Fernández 57'; Brochero 83' (o.g.)	Report		Stadium: Norberto "Tito" Tomaghello; Referee: Bruno Amiconi

5 February 2026	Barracas Central	2–2 (4–3 p)	Temperley	Sarandí, Pcia. de Buenos Aires
21:15	Bruera 57', 81'	Report	Aguiñagalde 31'; Werro 43'	Stadium: Julio Humberto Grondona; Referee: Nazareno Arasa
	Penalties
	Campi (penalty scored); Briasco (penalty scored); Bruera (penalty scored); Insúa (penalty scored)		(penalty scored) Nardelli; (penalty scored) Krüger; (penalty missed) Molina; (penalty scored) Angelini; (penalty missed) Arregui

5 February 2026	Deportivo Riestra	1–0	Deportivo Maipú	Caseros, Pcia. de Buenos Aires
19:00	Stringa 43'	Report		Stadium: Ciudad de Caseros; Referee: Daniel Zamora

=== Round of 32 ===
This round had 32 qualified teams from the Round of 64. It was played between 22 April and 17 July 2026 in a single knock-out match format. The 16 winning teams advanced to the Round of 16.

17 July 2026	San Lorenzo	1–1 (4–5 p)	Deportivo Riestra	Morón, Pcia. de Buenos Aires
18:45	Reali 25'	Report	González 51'	Stadium: Nuevo Francisco Urbano; Referee: Álvaro Carranza
	Penalties
	Cuello (penalty scored); Herrera (penalty scored); Córdoba (penalty missed); Tripichio (penalty scored); Auzmendi (penalty scored)		(penalty scored) Bracamonte; (penalty scored) Miño; (penalty scored) Benegas; (penalty scored) González; (penalty scored) Céliz

22 April 2026	Acassuso	0–3	Gimnasia y Esgrima (LP)	Caseros, Pcia. de Buenos Aires
19:00		Report	F. Torres 52'; Giampaoli 55'; N. Barros Schelotto 85'	Stadium: Ciudad de Caseros; Referee: Juan Cruz Robledo

8 May 2026	Banfield	1–1 (5–4 p)	San Martín (T)	Salta, Pcia. de Salta
21:10	Méndez 79'	Report	Borasi 45'	Stadium: Padre Ernesto Martearena; Referee: Ariel Penel
	Penalties
	Sepúlveda (penalty scored); Gómez (penalty scored); Meriano (penalty scored); Perrotta (penalty scored); Méndez (penalty scored)		(penalty scored) Briñone; (penalty scored) Castro; (penalty scored) L. Ferreyra; (penalty scored) Peñalba; (penalty missed) Gallardo

22 April 2026	Deportivo Morón	1–2	Midland	Turdera, Pcia. de Buenos Aires
21:15	Burruchaga 71'	Report	Perales 43'; Rogoski 78'	Stadium: Alfredo Beranger; Referee: Fabricio Llobet

16 July 2026	Racing	4–1	Defensa y Justicia	Quilmes, Pcia. de Buenos Aires
18:45	Miljevic 4'; Rojo 32' (pen.); Sosa 58'; A. Martínez 87'	Report	L. Fernández 51'	Stadium: Centenario Ciudad de Quilmes; Referee: Pablo Dóvalo

30 May 2026	Gimnasia y Esgrima (J)	2–2 (2–4 p)	Belgrano	Santiago del Estero, Pcia. de Santiago del Estero
15:30	Lazarte 20'; Molina 72'	Report	González Metilli 18'; Rigoni 90+3'	Stadium: Único Madre de Ciudades; Referee: Daniel Zamora
	Penalties
	Bianchi (penalty missed); Pombo (penalty scored); Argañaraz (penalty missed); Dematei (penalty scored)		(penalty scored) Rigoni; (penalty scored) Fernández; (penalty scored) Vázquez; (penalty scored) González Metilli

30 April 2026	Vélez Sarsfield	2–0	Gimnasia y Tiro	Caseros, Pcia. de Buenos Aires
21:15	Godoy 44'; Valdés 90'	Report		Stadium: Ciudad de Caseros; Referee: Felipe Viola

16 July 2026	Sarmiento (J)	0–2	Boca Juniors	Rosario, Pcia. de Santa Fe
21:45		Report	Velasco 50'; Flores 70'	Stadium: Marcelo Bielsa; Referee: Nazareno Arasa

17 July 2026	River Plate	1–3	Aldosivi	Salta, Pcia. de Salta
21:45	Borré 86'	Report	Fernández 11', 56'; Cordero 29'	Stadium: Padre Ernesto Martearena; Referee: Andrés Gariano

12 July 2026	Independiente Rivadavia	1–0	Tigre	Córdoba, Pcia. de Córdoba
16:15	Gómez 35' (pen.)	Report		Stadium: El Gigante de Alberdi; Referee: Leandro Rey Hilfer

20 May 2026	Talleres (C)	0–3	Atlético Tucumán	Rosario, Pcia. de Santa Fe
17:00		Report	Tesuri 3'; Godoy 57'; Laméndola 76'	Stadium: Marcelo Bielsa; Referee: Andrés Gariano

22 May 2026	Unión	0–2	Independiente	Rosario, Pcia. de Santa Fe
20:00		Report	Montiel 5'; Gutiérrez 23'	Stadium: Marcelo Bielsa; Referee: Sebastián Zunino

13 May 2026	Platense	0–0 (4–3 p)	San Martín (SJ)	Turdera, Pcia. de Buenos Aires
16:15		Report		Stadium: Alfredo Beranger; Referee: Bruno Amiconi
	Penalties
	Mainero (penalty scored); Mendía (penalty scored); Lagos (penalty scored); Zapiola (penalty scored)		(penalty missed) González; (penalty scored) Fúnez; (penalty scored) Marchio; (penalty scored) Zuliani; (penalty missed) Murillo

30 May 2026	Instituto	2–1	Lanús	Rosario, Pcia. de Santa Fe
18:00	Córdoba 35'; Lázaro 90+3'	Report	Besozzi 79'	Stadium: Marcelo Bielsa; Referee: Nazareno Arasa

31 May 2026	Estudiantes (LP)	3–0	Rosario Central	Córdoba, Pcia. de Córdoba
15:30	Carrillo 3'; Palacios 25' (pen.); Amondarain 86'	Report		Stadium: Mario Alberto Kempes; Referee: Leandro Rey Hilfer

2 June 2026	Barracas Central	1–0	Huracán	Sarandí, Pcia. de Buenos Aires
21:10	Martínez 65'	Report		Stadium: Julio Humberto Grondona; Referee: Sebastián Zunino

=== Round of 16 ===
This round had 16 qualified teams from the Round of 32. It was played between 12 August and 2 September 2026 in a single knock-out match format. The 8 winning teams advanced to the quarterfinals.

18 August 2026	Deportivo Riestra	1–1 (4–2 p)	Gimnasia y Esgrima (LP)	Florencio Varela, Pcia. de Buenos Aires
17:00	Benegas 38'	Report	Seoane 53'	Stadium: Norberto "Tito" Tomaghello; Referee: Pablo Echavarría
	Penalties
	Benegas (penalty scored); Miño (penalty scored); González (penalty scored); Céliz (penalty scored)		(penalty scored) Fernández; (penalty scored) Janson; (penalty missed) Auzmendi; (penalty missed) Colazo

18 August 2026	Banfield	2–2 (4–3 p)	Midland	Morón, Pcia. de Buenos Aires
21:15	Machado 15' (pen.); Adoryán 22'	Report	Marín 48'; Recalde 52'	Stadium: Nuevo Francisco Urbano; Referee: Bruno Amiconi
	Penalties
	Sepúlveda (penalty missed); Anselmo (penalty scored); Zalazar (penalty scored); Meriano (penalty scored); Gómez (penalty scored)		(penalty missed) Roseti; (penalty missed) Cao; (penalty scored) Recalde; (penalty scored) Flores; (penalty scored) Leguiza

19 August 2026	Racing	1–0	Belgrano	Villa Mercedes, Pcia. de San Luis
19:15	Conechny 4'	Report		Stadium: Único de Villa Mercedes; Referee: Sebastián Zunino

2 September 2026	Vélez Sarsfield	0–0 (3–4 p)	Boca Juniors	Córdoba, Pcia. de Córdoba
21:15		Report		Stadium: Mario Alberto Kempes; Referee: Sebastián Zunino
	Penalties
	Gómez (penalty missed); García (penalty scored); Escobar (penalty scored); Aliendro (penalty scored); Silvero (penalty missed)		(penalty scored) Blanco; (penalty scored) Zenón; (penalty missed) Valencia; (penalty scored) Flores; (penalty scored) Palacios

26 August 2026	Aldosivi	0–2	Independiente Rivadavia	Banfield, Pcia. de Buenos Aires
19:15		Report	Ríos 17'; Florentín 90+4'	Stadium: Florencio Sola; Referee: Andrés Gariano

12 August 2026	Atlético Tucumán	4–0	Independiente	Rosario, Pcia. de Santa Fe
19:15	Laméndola 31', 69'; Brondo 48'; Nicola 53'	Report		Stadium: Marcelo Bielsa; Referee: Facundo Tello

27 August 2026	Platense	1–1 (3–1 p)	Instituto	Rosario, Pcia. de Santa Fe
21:15	Silva 53'	Report	Tissera 28'	Stadium: Marcelo Bielsa; Referee: Leandro Rey Hilfer
	Penalties
	Zapiola (penalty scored); Lagos (penalty scored); Merlini (penalty scored)		(penalty missed) Sosa; (penalty missed) Suárez; (penalty scored) Galván; (penalty missed) Acevedo

27 August 2026	Estudiantes (LP)	3–1	Barracas Central	Florencio Varela, Pcia. de Buenos Aires
19:00	Jappert 39' (o.g.); Rodríguez 51'; Carrillo 88'	Report	Briasco 83'	Stadium: Norberto "Tito" Tomaghello; Referee: Nicolás Ramírez

=== Quarterfinals ===
This round had 8 qualified teams from the Round of 16. The round was played between 9 September and 1 October 2026, in a single knock-out match format. The 4 winning teams advanced to the semifinals.

9 September 2026	Deportivo Riestra	1–1 (6–7 p)	Banfield	Turdera, Pcia. de Buenos Aires
19:00	Stringa 45'	Report	Adoryán 50'	Stadium: Alfredo Beranger; Referee: Nicolás Ramírez
	Penalties
	Bracamonte (penalty scored); Miño (penalty scored); Benegas (penalty scored); González (penalty scored); Céliz (penalty scored); Ramírez (penalty scored); Quintana (penalty missed)		(penalty scored) Machado; (penalty scored) Anselmo; (penalty scored) Álvarez; (penalty scored) Meriano; (penalty scored) Rodríguez; (penalty scored) Adoryán; (penalty scored) Oviedo

27 September 2026	Racing	2–3	Boca Juniors	Rosario, Pcia. de Santa Fe
17:00	Lodico 18'; A. Martínez 46'	Report	Valencia 72', 80', 90+5'	Stadium: Gigante de Arroyito; Referee: Andrés Gariano

16 September 2026	Independiente Rivadavia	1–1 (2–3 p)	Atlético Tucumán	Lomas de Zamora, Pcia. de Buenos Aires
19:00	Arce 45+2' (pen.)	Report	Canelo 90+2'	Stadium: Eduardo Gallardón; Referee: Jorge Baliño
	Penalties
	Sartori (penalty scored); Studer (penalty scored); Villalba (penalty missed); Vigo (penalty missed); Arce (penalty missed)		(penalty scored) Díaz; (penalty scored) Granillo; (penalty missed) Ferreira; (penalty scored) Canelo

1 October 2026	Platense	1–0	Estudiantes (LP)	Florencio Varela, Pcia. de Buenos Aires
21:15	Lencina 83'	Report		Stadium: Norberto "Tito" Tomaghello; Referee: Facundo Tello

=== Semifinals ===
This round had 4 qualified teams from the quarterfinals. The round was played on 28 October and 14 November 2026, in a single knock-out match format. The 2 winning teams advanced to the final.

14 November 2026	Banfield	0–3	Boca Juniors	Mendoza, Pcia. de Mendoza
19:00		Report	Ascacíbar 45+1'; Villa 63'; Lozano 73'	Stadium: Malvinas Argentinas; Referee: Nazareno Arasa

28 October 2026	Atlético Tucumán	1–1 (4–5 p)	Platense	Salta, Pcia. de Salta
21:15	Tesuri 36'	Report	Retamar 58'	Stadium: Padre Ernesto Martearena; Referee: Sebastián Zunino
	Penalties
	Canelo (penalty scored); Granillo (penalty scored); Ferreira (penalty scored); Godoy (penalty scored); Compagnucci (penalty missed)		(penalty scored) Lagos; (penalty scored) Zapiola; (penalty scored) Sepúlveda; (penalty scored) Vázquez; (penalty scored) Mainero

=== Final ===
2 December 2026

Boca Juniors	63	Platense

== Top goalscorers ==
As of 14 November 2026

Rank	Player	Club	Goals
1	(Argentina) Guido Carrillo	Estudiantes (LP)	3
1	(Argentina) Tomás Fernández	Aldosivi	3
1	(Argentina) Nicolás Laméndola	Atlético Tucumán	3
1	(Argentina) Adrián Martínez	Racing	3
1	(Ecuador) Enner Valencia	Boca Juniors	3
6	(Armenia) Tomás Adoryán	Banfield	2
6	(Argentina) Tobías Andrada	Vélez Sarsfield	2
6	(Paraguay) Álex Arce	Independiente Rivadavia	2
6	(Paraguay) Adam Bareiro	Boca Juniors	2
6	(Argentina) Facundo Bruera	Barracas Central	2
6	(Argentina) Dilan Godoy	Vélez Sarsfield	2
6	(Argentina) Marcelino Moreno	Lanús	2
6	(Argentina) Tiziano Perrotta	Banfield	2
6	(Argentina) Matías Reali	San Lorenzo	2
6	(Argentina) Emiliano Rigoni	Belgrano	2
6	(Argentina) Gonzalo Ríos	Independiente Rivadavia	2
6	(Argentina) Ángel Stringa	Deportivo Riestra	2
6	(Argentina) Cristian Tarragona	Unión	2
6	(Argentina) Renzo Tesuri	Atlético Tucumán	2

Source: Copa Argentina

== See also ==
- 2026 AFA Liga Profesional de Fútbol
