= 2025 Club Atlético Belgrano season =

Club Atlético Belgrano
2025 season
- Manager: Walter Erviti (until 8 February); Ricardo Zielinski
- Stadium: El Gigante de Alberdi
- Torneo Apertura: 12th
- Torneo Clausura: 10th
- Copa Argentina: Semi-finals
Home colours	Away colours	Third colours

The 2025 season is the 120th for Club Atlético Belgrano and their 2nd consecutive season in the Primera División. The club will also take part in the Copa Argentina.

== Squad ==
=== Transfers In ===
Pos.	Player	Transferred from	Fee	Date	Source
DF	(Armenia) Lucas Zelarayán	(Saudi Arabia) Al Fateh	Free	1 January 2025	
DF	(Uruguay) Federico Ricca	(Belgium) OH Leuven	Free	26 June 2025	
GK	(Uruguay) Thiago Cardozo	(Argentina) Unión	Loan	4 July 2025	

=== Transfers Out ===
Pos.	Player	Transferred to	Fee	Date	Source
FW	(Argentina) Gonzalo Lencina	(Colombia) Deportes Tolima	Undisclosed	15 January 2025	
MF	(Chile) Matías Marín	(Chile) Unión Española	Loan	17 January 2025	

== Exhibition matches ==
16 January 2025	Montevideo Wanderers (Uruguay)	1–3	(Argentina) Belgrano

19 January 2025	Progreso (Uruguay)	0–0 (3–5 p)	(Argentina) Belgrano

== Competitions ==
=== Overall record ===
Competition	First match	Last match	Starting round	Record							
Competition	First match	Last match	Starting round	Pld	W	D	L	GF	GA	GD	Win %
Primera División	24 January 2025		Matchday 1	0	0	0	0	0	0	+0	—
Copa Argentina				0	0	0	0	0	0	+0	—
Total				0	0	0	0	0	0	+0	—

Source: Competitions

=== Primera División ===
==== Torneo Apertura ====
===== League table =====
Pos	Team	Pld	W	D	L	GF	GA	GD	Pts
10	Defensa y Justicia	16	5	4	7	18	22	−4	19
11	Central Córdoba (SdE)	16	5	3	8	21	22	−1	18
12	Belgrano	16	3	8	5	13	23	−10	17
13	Aldosivi	16	4	3	9	18	28	−10	15
14	Banfield	16	3	5	8	14	19	−5	14

Source: AFA

===== Results by round =====
Round	1
Ground	H
Result	
Position	

A = Away; H = Home; W = Win; D = Draw; L = Loss

===== Matches =====
24 January 2025 1	Belgrano	1–1	Huracán	Córdoba
21:00 UTC−3	Zabala 34' (o.g.)	Report	Mazzantti 38'	Stadium: El Gigante de Alberdi

30 January 2025 2	Racing	4–0	Belgrano	Avellaneda
19:15 UTC−3	Martínez 20', 68'; Vietto 62'; Balboa 82'	Report		Stadium: El Cilindro

3 February 2025 3	Belgrano	0–3	Independiente Rivadavia	Córdoba
21:30 UTC−3		Report	Villa 7' (pen.), 45+2'; Gómez 17'	Stadium: El Gigante de Alberdi

7 February 2025 4	Banfield	1–1	Belgrano	Banfield
17:45 UTC−3	Rivera 34'	Report	Jara 90+9'	Stadium: Estadio Florencio Sola

11 February 2025 5	Belgrano	2–0	Aldosivi	Córdoba
22:15 UTC−3	Fernández 5'; Troilo 54'	Report		Stadium: El Gigante de Alberdi

15 February 2025 6	Central Córdoba	4–0	Belgrano	Santiago del Estero
19:15 UTC−3	Cabral 18'; Florentín 42'; Rivero 61'; Barrera 87'	Report		Stadium: Estadio Único Madre de Ciudades

23 February 2025 7	Belgrano	2–0	Defensa y Justicia	Córdoba, Argentina
21:00 UTC−3	Fernández 38', 57'	Report		Stadium: El Gigante de Alberdi

28 February 2025 8	San Martín	3–1	Belgrano	San Juan
22:15 UTC−3	Fernández 53'; Iacobellis 55'; González 90+2'	Report	Fernández 51'	Stadium: Estadio Ingeniero Hilario Sánchez

9 March 2025 9	Newell's Old Boys	0–0	Belgrano	Rosario
21:30 UTC−3				Stadium: Estadio Marcelo Bielsa

16 March 2025 10	Belgrano	1–1	Barracas Central	Córdoba
21:00 UTC−3	Fernández 31'	Report	Tobio 36'	Stadium: El Gigante de Alberdi

30 March 2025 11	Belgrano	1–1	Talleres	Córdoba
--:-- UTC−3	Jara 66' (pen.)	Report	Rick 19'	Stadium: El Gigante de Alberdi; Referee: Sebastían Zunino

4 April 2025 12	Estudiantes	0–1	Belgrano	La Plata
19:00 UTC−3		Report	Fernández 41'	Stadium: Estadio Jorge Luis Hirschi

12 April 2025 13	Belgrano	1–3	Boca Juniors	Córdoba
20:30 UTC−3	Menossi 59'	Report	Rojo 37'; Zenón 60'; Palacios 75'	Stadium: Julio César Villagra; Referee: Hernán Mastrángelo

22 April 2025 14	Tigre	0–0	Belgrano	Victoria
--:-- UTC−3		Report		Stadium: Estadio José Dellagiovanna

26 April 2025 15	Belgrano	1–1	Argentinos Juniors	Córdoba
19:00 UTC−3	Fernández 21'	Report	Lescano 47'	Stadium: El Gigante de Alberdi

2 May 2025 16	Unión	1–1	Belgrano	Santa Fe
18:00 UTC−3	Gamba 38'	Report	Fernández 1'	Stadium: Estadio 15 de Abril

==== Torneo Clausura ====
===== League table =====
Pos	Team	Pld	W	D	L	GF	GA	GD	Pts	Qualification
8	Estudiantes (LP)	16	6	3	7	17	18	−1	21	Advance to round of 16
9	Banfield	16	6	3	7	15	21	−6	21	
10	Belgrano	16	4	8	4	13	11	+2	20	
11	Huracán	16	5	5	6	10	15	−5	20	
12	Defensa y Justicia	16	5	4	7	14	19	−5	19	

Source: AFA

===== Matches =====
12 July 2025 1	Huracán	0–3	Belgrano	Buenos Aires
18:30 UTC−3		Report	Jara 4'; Zelarayán 56'; Passerini 90+5'	Stadium: Estadio Tomás Adolfo Ducó

20 July 2025 2	Belgrano	0–1	Racing	Córdoba
19:00 UTC−3		Report	Vergara 51'	Stadium: El Gigante de Alberdi

25 July 2025 3	Independiente Rivadavia	0–0	Belgrano	Mendoza
21:15 UTC−3		Report		Stadium: Estadio Bautista Gargantini

9 August 2025 4	Belgrano	2–1	Banfield	Córdoba
20:45 UTC−3	Compagnucci 19'; Zelarayán 48'	Report	Méndez 57'	Stadium: El Gigante de Alberdi

15 August 2025 5	Aldosivi	0–0	Belgrano	Mar del Plata
15:30 UTC−3		Report		Stadium: Estadio José María Minella

25 August 2025 6	Belgrano	0–3	Central Córdoba	Córdoba
19:00 UTC−3		Report	Verón 3'; Barrera 53', 84'	Stadium: El Gigante de Alberdi

31 August 2025 7	Defensa y Justicia	2–1	Belgrano	Gobernador Costa
16:45 UTC−3	Delgado 8'; Miritello 75'	Report	Jara 30'	Stadium: Estadio Norberto "Tito" Tomaghello

11 September 2025 8	Belgrano	0–0	San Martín	Córdoba
20:00 UTC−3		Report		Stadium: El Gigante de Alberdi

29 September 2025 10	Barracas Central	1–1	Belgrano	Buenos Aires
15:30 UTC−3	Candia 16'	Report	Jara 49'	Stadium: Estadio Claudio Chiqui Tapia

11 October 2025 12	Belgrano	1–1	Estudiantes	Córdoba
22:15 UTC−3	Fernández 68'	Report	Compagnucci 90+4' (o.g.)	Stadium: El Gigante de Alberdi

=== Copa Argentina ===
16 April 2025 Round of 64	Belgrano	3–1	Real Pilar	Rafaela
21:10	Compagnucci 14'; Fernández 24', 34'	Report	Quignon 48' (o.g.)	Stadium: Nuevo Monumental; Referee: Nazareno Arasa

27 June 2025 Round of 32	Belgrano	3–2	Defensores de Belgrano	Villa Mercedes
21:10	Passerini 37' (pen.); Compagnucci 68'; Ostchega 80'	Report	Aguirre 7', 58'	Stadium: Único de Villa Mercedes; Referee: Sebastián Martínez

1 August 2025 Round of 16	Belgrano	2–0	Independiente	Rosario
17:10	Jara 45+1'; Zelarayán 71'	Report		Stadium: Gigante de Arroyito; Referee: Fernando Echenique

17 September 2025 Quarter-finals	Newell's Old Boys	1–3	Belgrano	Villa Mercedes
18:00	González 8'	Report	Jara 23', 77'; L. López 50'	Stadium: Único de Villa Mercedes; Referee: Leandro Rey Hilfer

23 October 2025 Semi-finals	Belgrano	1–2	Argentinos Juniors	Rosario
21:10	Zelarayán 35'	Report	López 58'; Molina 80' (pen.)	Stadium: Gigante de Arroyito; Referee: Yael Falcón Pérez
