= 2025 San Martín de San Juan season =

San Martín de San Juan
2025 season
- Primera División: Pre-season
- Copa Argentina: Pre-season

The 2025 season is the 120th for Club Atlético San Martín de San Juan and their first season back in the Primera División following promotion. The club will also participate in the Copa Argentina.

== Squad ==
=== Transfers In ===
Pos.	Player	Transferred to	Fee	Date	Source
MF	(Argentina) Diego González	(Chile) Unión Española	Undisclosed	13 March 2025	

== Competitions ==
=== Overall record ===
Competition	First match	Last match	Starting round	Record							
Competition	First match	Last match	Starting round	Pld	W	D	L	GF	GA	GD	Win %
Primera División	24 January 2025		Matchday 1	0	0	0	0	0	0	+0	—
Copa Argentina				0	0	0	0	0	0	+0	—
Total				0	0	0	0	0	0	+0	—

Source: Competitions

=== Primera División ===
==== Torneo Apertura ====
===== League table =====
Pos	Team	Pld	W	D	L	GF	GA	GD	Pts
11	Gimnasia y Esgrima (LP)	16	4	4	8	9	18	−9	16
12	Sarmiento (J)	16	2	9	5	11	19	−8	15
13	Vélez Sarsfield	16	4	2	10	7	22	−15	14
14	Talleres (C)	16	2	7	7	11	15	−4	13
15	San Martín (SJ)	16	2	3	11	5	18	−13	9

Source: AFA

===== Results by round =====
Round	1
Ground	H
Result	
Position	

A = Away; H = Home; W = Win; D = Draw; L = Loss

===== Matches =====
24 January 2025 1	San Martín	v	Atlético Tucumán
21:30 UTC−3

==== Torneo Clausura ====
===== League table =====
Pos	Team	Pld	W	D	L	GF	GA	GD	Pts	Qualification
8	Talleres (C)	16	5	6	5	9	12	−3	21	Advance to round of 16
9	Sarmiento (J)	16	5	5	6	13	17	−4	20	
10	San Martín (SJ)	16	4	7	5	13	16	−3	19	
11	Independiente	16	4	6	6	14	13	+1	18	
12	Atlético Tucumán	16	5	3	8	17	22	−5	18	

Source: AFA

===== Results by round =====
Round	1
Ground	
Result	
Position	

A = Away; H = Home; W = Win; D = Draw; L = Loss

===== Matches =====
13 July 2025 1	Atlético Tucumán	2–1	San Martín	Tucumán
16:30 UTC−3	Nicola 4'; Laméndola 90+5'	Report	Ferreira 90+1' (o.g.)	Stadium: Estadio Monumental José Fierro

21 July 2025 2	San Martín	3–2	Deportivo Riestra	San Juan
16:30 UTC−3	Tijanovich 29', 58' (pen.); Salle 79'	Report	Céliz 41'; Obredor 90'	Stadium: Estadio Ingeniero Hilario Sánchez

26 July 2025 3	Rosario Central	0–0	San Martín	Rosario
17:00 UTC−3		Report		Stadium: Estadio Gigante de Arroyito

9 August 2025 4	San Martín	0–1	Sarmiento	San Juan
14:30 UTC−3		Report	González 78'	Stadium: Estadio Ingeniero Hilario Sánchez

18 August 2025 5	Talleres	0–0	San Martín	Córdoba
21:00 UTC−3		Report		Stadium: Estadio Mario Alberto Kempes; Referee: Nazareno Arasa

=== Copa Argentina ===
26 March 2025 Round of 64	San Martín	0–0 (3–0 p)	Gimnasia y Esgrima (J)	Córdoba
17:00		Report		Stadium: El Gigante de Alberdi; Referee: Bryan Ferreyra
	Penalties
	Anselmo (penalty scored); Iacobellis (penalty scored); F. González (penalty scored)		(penalty missed) Dematei; (penalty missed) Duré; (penalty missed) Noble

2 July 2025 Round of 32	Racing	3–1	San Martín	La Punta
18:45	Martínez 28', 78'; Balboa 73'	Report	Tijanovich 19'	Stadium: Provincial Juan Gilberto Funes; Referee: Fernando Echenique
