= 2025 Club Atlético Banfield season =

Club Atlético Banfield
2025 season
- Manager: Ariel Broggi (until 27 April); Pedro Troglio (from 29 April)
- Stadium: Estadio Florencio Sola
- Primera División: Apertura: 14th
- Copa Argentina: Round of 32
- Average home league attendance: 20,273
Home colours	Away colours	Third colours

The 2025 season is the 129th for Club Atlético Banfield and their 11th consecutive season in the Primera División. The club will also compete in the Copa Argentina.

== Squad ==
=== Transfers In ===
Pos.	Player	Transferred from	Fee	Date	Source
GK	(Peru) Diego Romero	(Peru) Universitario	Loan	2 January 2025	
MF	(Argentina) Martín Río	(Mexico) Querétaro	Loan	5 January 2025	
MF	(Argentina) Santiago López García	(Argentina) Gimnasia y Esgrima de Mendoza	Loan	15 January 2025	
FW	(Argentina) Tomás Nasif	(Argentina) River Plate II	Loan	15 January 2025	
FW	(Uruguay) Agustín Alaniz	(Uruguay) Racing Club de Montevideo	U$S 900.000	15 January 2025	
FW	(Argentina) Rodrigo Auzmendi	(Honduras) Motagua	Undisclosed	1 June 2025	
DF	(Argentina) Sergio Vittor	Kuwait SC	Free	25 June 2025	
FW	(Uruguay) Mauro Méndez	(Argentina) Estudiantes	Loan	17 July 2025	

=== Transfers Out ===
Pos.	Player	Transferred to	Fee	Date	Source
MF	(Argentina) Braian Galván	(Greece) Panserraikos	Free	2 February 2025	
MF	(Argentina) Gerónimo Rivera	(United Arab Emirates) Al Wahda	US$2,000,000	12 July 2025	
DF	(Argentina) Ramiro Di Luciano	(Russia) CSKA Moscow	US$1,300,000	18 August 2025	

== Friendlies ==
2 July 2025 Friendly	Desportiva Ferroviária (Brazil)	0–1	(Argentina) Banfield	Cariacica, Brazil
20:00 UTC−3		Report	Adoryán 48'	Stadium: Estádio Engenheiro Alencar Araripe

6 July 2025 Vitória Cup	Cruzeiro (Brazil)	1–0	(Argentina) Banfield	Cariacica, Brazil
16:00 UTC−3				Stadium: Estádio Kleber Andrade

== Competitions ==
=== Overall record ===
Competition	First match	Last match	Starting round	Record							
Competition	First match	Last match	Starting round	Pld	W	D	L	GF	GA	GD	Win %
Primera División	23 January 2025		Matchday 1	0	0	0	0	0	0	+0	—
Copa Argentina				0	0	0	0	0	0	+0	—
Total				0	0	0	0	0	0	+0	—

Source: Competitions

=== Primera División ===
==== Torneo Apertura ====
===== League table =====
Pos	Team	Pld	W	D	L	GF	GA	GD	Pts
11	Central Córdoba (SdE)	16	5	3	8	21	22	−1	18
12	Belgrano	16	3	8	5	13	23	−10	17
13	Aldosivi	16	4	3	9	18	28	−10	15
14	Banfield	16	3	5	8	14	19	−5	14
15	Unión	16	3	5	8	11	17	−6	14

Source: AFA

===== Results by round =====
Round	1
Ground	A
Result	
Position	

A = Away; H = Home; W = Win; D = Draw; L = Loss

===== Matches =====
Win Draw Loss Postponed

23 January 2025 1	Defensa y Justicia	0–1	Banfield	Gobernador Costa
21:30 UTC−3		Report	Nasif 59'	Stadium: Estadio Norberto "Tito" Tomaghello

27 January 2025 2	Banfield	3–0	Newell's Old Boys	Banfield
20:00 UTC−3	Nasif 30' (pen.), 55'; Alaniz 45+1'			Stadium: Estadio Florencio Sola

1 February 2025 3	Barracas Central	1–0	Banfield	Sarandí
17:00 UTC−3	Jappert 18'	Report		Stadium: Estadio Julio Humberto Grondona

7 February 2025 4	Banfield	1–1	Belgrano	Banfield
17:45 UTC−3	Rivera 34'	Report	Jara 90+9'	Stadium: Estadio Florencio Sola

11 February 2025 5	Estudiantes	1–0	Banfield	La Plata
20:00 UTC−3	Alario 78' (pen.)	Report		Stadium: Estadio Jorge Luis Hirschi

14 February 2025 6	Banfield	0–1	Boca Juniors	Banfield
20:00 UTC−3		Report	Di Lollo 86'	Stadium: Florencio Solá; Referee: Pablo Dóvalo

24 February 2025 7	Tigre	1–0	Banfield	Victoria
21:00 UTC−3	Ignacio Russo 59'	Report		Stadium: Estadio José Dellagiovanna

4 March 2025 8	Banfield	0–0	Independiente	Banfield
19:30 UTC−3		Report		Stadium: Estadio Florencio Sola

7 March 2025 9	Banfield	1–2	Argentinos Juniors	Banfield
19:00 UTC−3	Rodríguez 8' (o.g.)		Molina 62'; Gómez 90+2'	Stadium: Estadio Florencio Sola

17 March 2025 10	Unión	3–1	Banfield	Santa Fe
21:30 UTC−3	Ezequiel Ham 45+2'; Estigarribia 79'; Díaz 90+4'	Report	Adoryan 49'	Stadium: Estadio 15 de Abril

28 March 2025 11	Banfield	0–0	Huracán	Banfield
19:15 UTC−3		Report		Stadium: Estadio Florencio Sola

6 April 2025 12	Racing	4–1	Banfield	Avellaneda
20:15 UTC−3	Martínez 42', 47', 55'; Solari 76'		Alaniz 90+1'	Stadium: El Cilindro

11 April 2025 13	Banfield	1–1	Independiente Rivadavia	Banfield
17:45 UTC−3	López García 12'	Report	Sartori 84'	Stadium: Estadio Florencio Sola

19 April 2025 14	Lanús	1–1	Banfield	Lanús
16:15 UTC−3	Salvio 26' (pen.)	Report	Rivera 76'	Stadium: Estadio Ciudad de Lanús

26 April 2025 15	Aldosivi	2–1	Banfield	Mar del Plata
15:00 UTC−3	Mottes 39'; Preciado 67'	Report	Vega 88' (pen.)	Stadium: Estadio José María Minella

2 May 2025 16	Banfield	3–1	Central Córdoba	Banfield
15:30 UTC−3	Río 1', 35'; Arturia 63'	Report	Verón 77'	Stadium: Estadio Florencio Sola

==== Torneo Clausura ====
===== League table =====
Pos	Team	Pld	W	D	L	GF	GA	GD	Pts	Qualification
7	Tigre	16	5	7	4	14	13	+1	22	Advance to round of 16
8	Estudiantes (LP)	16	6	3	7	17	18	−1	21	Advance to round of 16
9	Banfield	16	6	3	7	15	21	−6	21	
10	Belgrano	16	4	8	4	13	11	+2	20	
11	Huracán	16	5	5	6	10	15	−5	20	

Source: AFA

===== Matches =====
14 July 2025 1	Banfield	0–0	Defensa y Justicia	Banfield
19:00 UTC−3		Report		Stadium: Estadio Florencio Sola

20 July 2025 2	Newell's Old Boys	1–2	Banfield	Rosario
16:45 UTC−3	Banega 59'	Report	Auzmendi 44'; Méndez 73'	Stadium: Estadio Marcelo Bielsa

28 July 2025 3	Banfield	1–3	Barracas Central	Banfield
20:00 UTC−3	Auzmendi 33'	Report	Ruiz 20'; Tobio 35'; Jappert 44'	Stadium: Estadio Florencio Sola

9 August 2025 4	Belgrano	2–1	Banfield	Córdoba
20:45 UTC−3	Compagnucci 19'; Zelarayán 48'	Report	Méndez 57'	Stadium: El Gigante de Alberdi

17 August 2025 5	Banfield	3–2	Estudiantes	Banfield
16:15 UTC−3	Auzmendi 54'; Ríos 61'; Río 63'	Report	Arzamendia 20'; Gómez 45'	Stadium: Estadio Florencio Sola

24 August 2025 6	Boca Juniors	2–0	Banfield	Buenos Aires
18:15 UTC−3	Merentiel 54'; Cavani 81'	Report		Stadium: La Bombonera; Referee: Nicolás Lamolina

17 August 2025 7	Banfield	1–0	Tigre	Banfield
16:15 UTC−3	Méndez 68'	Report		Stadium: Estadio Florencio Sola

13 September 2025 8	Independiente	0–1	Banfield	Avellaneda
16:45 UTC−3		Report	Río 37'	Stadium: Estadio Libertadores de América

=== Copa Argentina ===
1 April 2025 Round of 64	Banfield	1–0	Villa Mitre	Florencio Varela
19:00	Alaniz 30'			Stadium: Estadio Norberto "Tito" Tomaghello; Referee: Pablo Dóvalo

26 June 2025 Round of 32	Tigre	2–0	Banfield	Morón
19:30	Scipioni 29'; Armoa 75'	Report		Stadium: Estadio Nuevo Francisco Urbano
