= 2025 Club Atlético Sarmiento season =

Club Atlético Sarmiento
2025 season
- Chairman: Fernando Chiófalo
- Manager: Javier Sanguinetti
- Stadium: Estadio Eva Perón
- Torneo Apertura: 12th
- Torneo Clausura: Pre-season
- Copa Argentina: Round of 64
Home colours	Away colours	Third colours

The 2025 season is the 114th for Club Atlético Sarmiento and their 5th consecutive season in the Primera División. The club will also take part in the Copa Argentina.

== Squad ==
=== Transfers In ===
Pos.	Player	Transferred from	Fee	Date	Source
DF	(Argentina) Alex Vigo	(Argentina) Talleres	Loan	20 January 2025	
MF	(Argentina) Elián Giménez	(Argentina) River Plate	Loan	22 January 2025	
MF	(Argentina) Carlos Villalba	(Argentina) Talleres	Loan	15 February 2025	
FW	(Uruguay) Joaquín Ardaiz	(Argentina) Argentinos Juniors	Loan	13 June 2025	
MF	(Argentina) David Gallardo	(Argentina) Agropecuario	Loan return	18 June 2025	
FW	(Argentina) Santiago Rodríguez	(Argentina) Argentinos Juniors	Loan	20 June 2025	
MF	(Argentina) Benjamín Borasi	(Brazil) Paysandu	Loan return	30 June 2025	
MF	(Argentina) Jonathan Gómez	(Argentina) Rosario Central	Free	30 June 2025	
FW	(Argentina) Julián Contrera	(Argentina) Newell's Old Boys	Loan	30 June 2025	
MF	(Argentina) Gastón González	(Argentina) Defensa y Justicia	Loan	3 July 2025	
FW	(Argentina) Lucas Pratto	(Paraguay) Olimpia	Free	4 July 2025	

=== Transfers Out ===
Pos.	Player	Transferred to	Fee	Date	Source
MF	(Argentina) David Gallardo	(Argentina) Agropecuario	Loan	21 January 2025	
MF	(Argentina) David Gallardo	(Argentina) Mitre	Loan	19 June 2025	
MF	(Argentina) Joaquín Gho	(Argentina) Argentinos Juniors	Undisclosed	19 June 2025	
MF	(Argentina) Manuel Mónaco	(Colombia) La Equidad	Loan	25 June 2025	
MF	(Argentina) Bruno Liuzzi	(Chile) Concón National	Undisclosed	13 July 2025	
MF	(Argentina) Benjamín Borasi	(Brazil) Criciúma	Loan	24 July 2025	

== Competitions ==
=== Overall record ===
Competition	First match	Last match	Starting round	Final position	Record							
Competition	First match	Last match	Starting round	Final position	Pld	W	D	L	GF	GA	GD	Win %
Torneo Apertura	24 January 2025	3 May 2025	Matchday 1	12th	16	2	9	5	11	19	−8	12.50
Copa Argentina	9 April 2025		Round of 64	Round of 64	1	0	0	1	0	1	−1	0.00
Total					17	2	9	6	11	20	−9	11.76

Source: Competitions

=== Primera División ===
==== Torneo Apertura ====
===== League table =====
Pos	Team	Pld	W	D	L	GF	GA	GD	Pts
10	Atlético Tucumán	16	5	1	10	17	21	−4	16
11	Gimnasia y Esgrima (LP)	16	4	4	8	9	18	−9	16
12	Sarmiento (J)	16	2	9	5	11	19	−8	15
13	Vélez Sarsfield	16	4	2	10	7	22	−15	14
14	Talleres (C)	16	2	7	7	11	15	−4	13

Source: AFA

===== Results by round =====
Round	1
Ground	A
Result	
Position	

A = Away; H = Home; W = Win; D = Draw; L = Loss

===== Matches =====
24 January 2025 1	Independiente	2–1	Sarmiento	Avellaneda
19:15 UTC−3	Ávalos 15' (pen.), 48'	Report	Magnin 77' (pen.)	Stadium: Estadio Libertadores de América

==== Torneo Clausura ====
===== League table =====
Pos	Team	Pld	W	D	L	GF	GA	GD	Pts	Qualification
7	Talleres (C)	15	5	5	5	9	12	−3	20	Advance to round of 16
8	San Martín (SJ)	15	4	7	4	11	12	−1	19	Advance to round of 16
9	Sarmiento (J)	15	5	4	6	12	16	−4	19	
10	Atlético Tucumán	15	5	3	7	16	19	−3	18	
11	Gimnasia y Esgrima (LP)	14	5	1	8	9	16	−7	16	

Updated to match(es) played on 9 November 2025. Source: AFA

===== Results by round =====
Round	1
Ground	
Result	
Position	

A = Away; H = Home; W = Win; D = Draw; L = Loss

===== Matches =====
13 July 2025 1	Sarmiento	2–2	Independiente	Junín
14:15 UTC−3	Ardaiz 33'; Giménez 55'	Report	Ávalos 46' Loyola 83'	Stadium: Estadio Eva Perón

19 July 2025 2	Godoy Cruz	0–0	Sarmiento	Godoy Cruz
18:45 UTC−3		Report		Stadium: Estadio Feliciano Gambarte

25 July 2025 3	Sarmiento	0–2	Lanús	Junín
19:00 UTC−3		Report	Castillo 10', 43'	Stadium: Estadio Eva Perón

9 August 2025 4	San Martín	0–1	Sarmiento	San Juan
14:30 UTC−3		Report	González 78'	Stadium: Estadio Ingeniero Hilario Sánchez

18 August 2025 5	Sarmiento	2–2	Atlético Tucumán	Junín
19:00 UTC−3	Ardaiz 6', 45'	Report	Coronel 87'; Auzuqui 90+3'	Stadium: Estadio Eva Perón; Referee: Jorge Ignacio Baliño

=== Copa Argentina ===
9 April 2025 Round of 64	Sarmiento	0–1	Central Córdoba (R)	Caseros
21:10		Report	Marín 31'	Stadium: Ciudad de Caseros; Referee: Bruno Amiconi
