= 2026 Copa Argentina Final =

2026 Copa Argentina final
- Event: 2026 Copa Argentina
Boca Juniors	Platense
- Date: 2 December 2026

The 2026 Copa Argentina final was the 63rd and final match of the 2026 Copa Argentina. It was played on 2 December 2026 at TBD in TBD between Boca Juniors and Platense. TBD was the referee for the match.

The winners will qualify for the 2026 Supercopa Argentina. Since Boca Juniors qualified for the 2027 Copa Libertadores by winning the 2026 Copa Sudamericana, Platense also secured a spot in the tournament—a spot awarded to the Copa Argentina champions, regardless of whether they finish first or second.

== Qualified teams ==
Team	Previous finals app.
Boca Juniors	4 (**1969, 2011–12, 2014–15, 2019–20**)
Platense	None

Bold indicates winners

== Road to the final ==
Boca Juniors			Round	Platense		
Opponent	Venue	Score		Opponent	Venue	Score
Gimnasia y Esgrima (Ch) [es]	Salta	1–0	Round of 64	Argentino (MM) [es]	Caseros	1–0
Sarmiento (J)	Rosario	2–0	Round of 32	San Martín (SJ)	Turdera	0–0 (4–3 p)
Vélez Sarsfield	Córdoba	0–0 (4–3 p)	Round of 16	Instituto	Rosario	1–1 (3–1 p)
Racing	Rosario	3–2	Quarter-finals	Estudiantes (LP)	Florencio Varela	1–0
Banfield	Mendoza	3–0	Semi-finals	Atlético Tucumán	Salta	1–1 (5–4 p)

== Match details ==
2 December 2026

Boca Juniors	v	Platense
	Report

=== Statistics ===
Overall
	Boca Juniors	Platense
Goals scored		
Total shots		
Shots on target		
Ball possession	%	%
Corner kicks		
Fouls committed		
Offsides		
Yellow cards		
Red cards		
