= Alcides González =

Argentine footballer

Personal information
- Full name: Alcides González
- Date of birth: 4 September 1981 (age 45)
- Place of birth: Tres Lagunas, Argentina
- Position: Midfielder

Senior career*
Years	Team	Apps	(Gls)
2002–2008	Deportivo Español	122	(2)
2009	San Marcos	5	(0)
2010–2011	San Miguel	15	(1)
2011–2012	Midland	10	(0)
2013–2014	Deportivo Camioneros	12	(0)
Total		164	(3)
- * Club domestic league appearances and goals

Alcides González (born 4 September 1981) is an Argentine former soccer player who played as a midfielder.

== Teams ==
- (Argentina) Deportivo Español 2002–2008
- (Chile) San Marcos de Arica 2009
- (Argentina) San Miguel 2010–2011
- (Argentina) Midland 2011–2012
- (Argentina) Deportivo Camioneros 2013–2014
