= Hausch =

Hausch is a surname of German origin. Notable people with the surname include:

- Agustin Hausch (born 2003), Argentine footballer
- Gudrun Hausch (born 1969), German judoka
- Maylin Hausch, later known as Maylin Wende (born 1988), German pair skater
