= Tiziano Perrotta =

Argentine footballer (born 2006)

Personal information
- Date of birth: 25 November 2006 (age 19)
- Place of birth: Nueve de Julio, Argentina
- Height: 1.80 m (5 ft 11 in)
- Position: Forward

Team information
- Current team: Defensa y Justicia (on loan from Elche)
- Number: 17

Youth career
- Agustín Álvarez
- 2023–2025: Banfield

Senior career*
Years	Team	Apps	(Gls)
2025–2026	Banfield	17	(6)
2026–	Elche	0	(0)
2026–	→ Defensa y Justicia (loan)	0	(0)
- * Club domestic league appearances and goals as of 18:47, 10 August 2026 (UTC)

Tiziano Perrotta (born 25 November 2006) is an Argentine footballer who plays as a forward for Defensa y Justicia, on loan from La Liga club Elche.

== Career ==
=== Banfield ===
Born in Nueve de Julio, Buenos Aires, Perrotta began his career with hometown side Club Agustín Álvarez before joining the youth sides of Banfield in 2023.

Before joining Banfield, Perrotta trained at Academia Javier Mascherano from 2021 to 2023, located in Lincoln, Buenos Aires Province. At the age of 14, he made his debut for Academia in the Torneo Regional Federal Amateur, Argentina's regional amateur football competition.

He made his first team debut on 26 June 2025, coming on as a second-half substitute for Agustín Alaniz in a 2–0 Copa Argentina away loss to Tigre.

On 22 July 2025, Perrotta signed his first professional contract with the club, agreeing to a deal until December 2027. He was definitely promoted to the first team for the 2026 season, and scored his first goals on 21 February of that year, netting a brace in a 3–0 home win over Newell's Old Boys.

=== Elche ===
On 13 August 2026, La Liga side Elche announced the signing of Perrotta on a six-year deal, and he was immediately loaned out to Defensa y Justicia for one year.

== Career statistics ==
As of 10 August 2026

Club	Season	League			Cup		Continental		Other		Total	
Club	Season	Division	Apps	Goals	Apps	Goals	Apps	Goals	Apps	Goals	Apps	Goals
Banfield	2025	Liga Profesional	1	0	1	0	—		—		2	0
Banfield	2026	Liga Profesional	16	6	2	2	—		—		18	8
Career total			17	6	3	2	0	0	0	0	20	8
