= Mariano Troilo =

Argentine footballer

Personal information
- Full name: Mariano Emir Troilo
- Date of birth: 21 June 2003 (age 23)
- Place of birth: Córdoba, Argentina
- Height: 1.94 m (6 ft 4 in)
- Position: Centre-back

Team information
- Current team: Parma
- Number: 37

Youth career
- 2007–2013: EFUL
- 2013–2023: Belgrano

Senior career*
Years	Team	Apps	(Gls)
2023–2025	Belgrano	45	(2)
2025–	Parma	32	(1)

International career^{‡}
2026–	Argentina	1	(0)
- * Club domestic league appearances and goals as of 7 November 2026 ‡ National team caps and goals as of 23:45, 17 November 2026 (UTC)

Mariano Emir Troilo (born 21 June 2003) is an Argentine professional footballer who plays as a centre-back for Serie A club Parma and the Argentina national team.

== Club career ==
Troilo began playing football locally in the EFUL school at the age of 4, before joining Belgrano's youth academy at the age of 10 where he worked his way up their youth categories. On 7 April 2023, he signed his first professional contract with Belgrano until December 2024. On 4 August 2023, he made his senior and professional debut with Belgrano in a 1–0 Copa Argentina win over Claypole.

In August 2025, he left the Córdoba club after reaching an agreement with Parma of Italy. The transfer, valued at over €7 million, makes Troilo one of the most expensive sales in Belgrano's history and includes a 20% sell-on clause for any future transfer.

On 21 August 2025, Troilo signed a five-year contract with Parma.

== International career ==
Born in Argentina, Troilo is of Italian descent. On 15 May 2025, Troilo was called up to the Argentina national team for a set of 2026 FIFA World Cup qualification matches in June. He made his debut on 17 November 2026 in a friendly against Costa Rica.

== Career statistics ==
=== Club ===
As of match played 24 May 2026

Appearances and goals by club, season and competition
Club	Season	League			National cup		Continental		Other		Total	
Club	Season	Division	Apps	Goals	Apps	Goals	Apps	Goals	Apps	Goals	Apps	Goals
Belgrano	2023	Argentine Primera División	2	0	2	0	—		—		4	0
Belgrano	2024	Argentine Primera División	25	1	0	0	7 (Note: Appearances in Copa Sudamericana)	0	—		32	1
Belgrano	2025	Argentine Primera División	18	1	3	0	—		—		21	1
Belgrano	Total		45	2	5	0	7	0	0	0	57	2
Parma	2025–26	Serie A	21	1	2	0	—		—		23	1
Career total			66	3	7	0	7	0	0	0	70	3
