= Marcos Roseti =

Argentine professional footballer

Personal information
- Full name: Marcos Nahuel Roseti
- Date of birth: 3 August 1997 (age 29)
- Place of birth: Argentina
- Position: Forward

Team information
- Current team: Midland

Senior career*
Years	Team	Apps	(Gls)
2015–2019	Barracas Central	5	(0)
2017–2018	→ Sarmiento (loan)	0	(0)
2019–2020	Berazategui	30	(0)
2021–2023	Deportivo Laferrere	83	(9)
2023	Deportivo Iztapa	19	(5)
2024	Xelajú	9	(0)
2024–	Midland	32	(3)
2025	→ Quilmes (loan)	19	(0)
- * Club domestic league appearances and goals as of 17:05, 28 April 2026 (UTC)

Marcos Nahuel Roseti (born 3 August 1997) is an Argentine professional footballer who plays as a forward for Midland in the Primera Nacional of Argentina.

== Career ==
Roseti's career began with Barracas Central. He made his professional bow for the Primera B Metropolitana team on 14 November 2015 against Deportivo Riestra, coming off the bench after fifty minutes of an eventual 5–4 victory. Three further appearances followed in the 2016 season, though he didn't appear in the subsequent 2016–17. On 30 June 2017, Roseti joined Primera B Nacional's Sarmiento on loan. He remained for twelve months but didn't feature for their first-team. His next appearance for Barracas Central arrived in May 2019 versus All Boys.

After being loaned to Quilmes, in 2026 he returned to the Midland to play in the Primera Nacional.

== Career statistics ==
As of 14 May 2019.

Appearances and goals by club, season and competition
Club	Season	League			Cup		League Cup		Continental		Other		Total	
Club	Season	Division	Apps	Goals	Apps	Goals	Apps	Goals	Apps	Goals	Apps	Goals	Apps	Goals
Barracas Central	2015	Primera B Metropolitana	1	0	0	0	—		—		0	0	1	0
Barracas Central	2016	Primera B Metropolitana	3	0	0	0	—		—		0	0	3	0
Barracas Central	2016–17	Primera B Metropolitana	0	0	0	0	—		—		0	0	0	0
Barracas Central	2017–18	Primera B Metropolitana	0	0	0	0	—		—		0	0	0	0
Barracas Central	2018–19	Primera B Metropolitana	1	0	0	0	—		—		0	0	1	0
Barracas Central	Total		5	0	0	0	—		—		0	0	5	0
Sarmiento (loan)	2017–18	Primera B Nacional	0	0	0	0	—		—		0	0	0	0
Career total			5	0	0	0	—		—		0	0	5	0

== Honours ==
Barracas Central

- Primera B Metropolitana: 2018–19
