= Gastón González (footballer, born 2001) =

Argentine footballer

Personal information
- Full name: Gastón Nicolás González
- Date of birth: 27 June 2001 (age 25)
- Place of birth: Santa Fe, Argentina
- Height: 1.84 m (6 ft 0 in)
- Position: Winger

Team information
- Current team: Sarmiento (on loan from Defensa y Justicia)
- Number: 22

Youth career
- Unión Santa Fe

Senior career*
Years	Team	Apps	(Gls)
2019–2022	Unión Santa Fe	23	(5)
2022–2024	Orlando City	18	(0)
2024	→ Nacional (loan)	18	(1)
2025–	Defensa y Justicia	7	(0)
2025–	→ Sarmiento (loan)	26	(2)
- * Club domestic league appearances and goals as of 04:05, 10 November 2026 (UTC)

Gastón Nicolás González (born 27 June 2001) is an Argentine professional footballer who plays as a winger for Primera División club Sarmiento, on loan from Defensa y Justicia.

== Club career ==
=== Unión Santa Fe ===
González started his career with Unión Santa Fe. He made the breakthrough towards the end of the 2018–19 campaign, featuring for the final ten minutes of a Copa de la Superliga draw away to San Martín on 13 April 2019; having been substituted on by Leonardo Madelón in place of Augusto Lotti. On 21 December 2020, during his seventh career appearance, González scored his first senior goal in a 2–2 draw away to Rosario Central in the Copa de la Liga Profesional.

=== Orlando City ===
On 5 May 2022, Orlando City announced the signing of González as an U22 initiative player on a three-year contract with three additional option years although he was immediately placed on the Season Ending Injury list having torn his ACL in what was already scheduled to be his final appearance for Unión on 19 April. He made his debut for the club during the 2023 season and made a total of 21 appearances in all competitions but struggled for both game time and form, failing to score a goal but registering two assists. On 5 December 2024, it was announced that the club were allowing González's contract to expire and they were not interested in pursuing an extension.

==== Loan to Nacional ====
On 27 January 2024, it was announced González had joined Uruguayan Primera División team Nacional on a year-long loan with an option to buy. He made his debut on 6 February as a half-time substitute in a 2–1 defeat to Liverpool in the 2023 Copa Uruguay round of 16. González scored his first goal for the club after coming on as a 68th-minute substitute for Diego Zabala in a 2–0 victory over Montevideo Wanderers on 15 September.

=== Defensa y Justicia ===
On 25 January 2025, González was announced as a signing by Primera División club Defensa y Justicia on a one-year contract with an option to extend for three more seasons. On 15 February, González made his debut for the club when he subbed on in the 83rd-minute for Juan Miritello in a 1–1 draw with Barracas Central.

==== Loan to Sarmiento ====
On 3 July 2025, González joined fellow Primera División club Sarmiento on loan until the end of 2026, with an option to buy. Ten days later, González made his debut when he started in a 2–2 draw with Independiente in the opening match of Torneo Clausura. On 9 August, González scored his first goal for the club when he scored the lone goal of a 1–0 win at San Martín.

== International career ==
In 2019, González was selected to train against Argentina's senior squad at the Copa América in Brazil.

== Career statistics ==
As of 6 November 2026

Appearances and goals by club, season and competition
Club	Season	League			Cup (Note: Includes Copa Argentina, U.S. Open Cup and Copa Uruguay)		League cup		Continental (Note: Includes CONCACAF Champions Cup and Copa Sudamericana)		Other		Total	
Club	Season	Division	Apps	Goals	Apps	Goals	Apps	Goals	Apps	Goals	Apps	Goals	Apps	Goals
Unión Santa Fe	2018–19	Primera División	0	0	0	0	1 (Note: Appearance(s) in the Copa de la Superliga)	0	0	0	—		1	0
Unión Santa Fe	2019–20	Primera División	0	0	0	0	8 (Note: Appearance(s) in the Copa de la Liga Profesional)	2	1	0	—		9	2
Unión Santa Fe	2021	Primera División	23	5	—		13	0	—		—		36	5
Unión Santa Fe	2022	Primera División	0	0	1	0	11	1	1	0	—		13	1
Unión Santa Fe	Total		23	5	1	0	33	3	2	0	0	0	59	8
Orlando City	2022	Major League Soccer	0	0	0	0	0	0	—		—		0	0
Orlando City	2023	Major League Soccer	18	0	1	0	0	0	2	0	0	0	21	0
Orlando City	Total		18	0	1	0	0	0	2	0	0	0	21	0
Nacional (loan)	2024	Uruguayan Primera División	18	1	1	0	—		0	0	—		19	1
Defensa y Justicia	2025	Primera División	7	0	1	0	0	0	2	0	—		10	0
Sarmiento (loan)	2025	Primera División	10	1	—		—		—		—		10	1
Sarmiento (loan)	2026	Primera División	16	1	0	0	—		—		—		16	1
Career total			92	8	4	0	33	3	6	0	0	0	134	11
