= Benjamín Borasi =

Argentine footballer

Personal information
- Full name: Benjamín Manuel Borasi
- Date of birth: 11 November 1997 (age 29)
- Place of birth: Rojas, Argentina
- Height: 1.70 m (5 ft 7 in)
- Position: Forward

Team information
- Current team: Náutico (on loan from Sarmiento)

Youth career
- 2004–2016: El Huracán Rojas
- 2016–2019: Sarmiento

Senior career*
Years	Team	Apps	(Gls)
2019–	Sarmiento	30	(1)
2022	→ Flandria (loan)	35	(2)
2023	→ San Martín de San Juan (loan)	27	(4)
2024	→ São Luiz (loan)	7	(1)
2024–2025	→ Paysandu (loan)	28	(4)
2025	→ Criciúma (loan)	15	(1)
2026	→ San Martín Tucumán (loan)	12	(0)
2026–	→ Náutico (loan)	16	(2)
- * Club domestic league appearances and goals as of 18 November 2026

Benjamín Manuel Borasi (born 11 November 1997) is an Argentine professional footballer who plays as a forward for Náutico, on loan from Sarmiento.

== Career ==
Borasi began in the youth set-up of El Huracán Rojas in 2004, where he remained until 2016 when he signed for Sarmiento. He made the move into senior football in March 2019, playing the full duration of a Copa Argentina defeat to Primera B Metropolitana's All Boys at the Estadio Julio Humberto Grondona on 27 March. In January 2022, Borasi was loaned out to Primera Nacional club CSD Flandria for one year.

=== Paysandu ===
On 09 July 2024, Borasi joined Campeonato Brasileiro Série B club Paysandu.

== Honours ==
Paysandu

- Supercopa Grão-Pará: 2025
- Copa Verde:2025

== Career statistics ==
As of 28 March 2019.

Appearances and goals by club, season and competition
Club	Season	League			Cup		Continental		Other		Total	
Club	Season	Division	Apps	Goals	Apps	Goals	Apps	Goals	Apps	Goals	Apps	Goals
Sarmiento	2018–19	Primera B Nacional	0	0	1	0	—		0	0	1	0
Career total			0	0	1	0	—		0	0	1	0
