= Martín Río =

Argentine footballer (born 2001)

Personal information
- Date of birth: 14 March 2001 (age 25)
- Place of birth: Quilmes, Argentina
- Height: 1.75 m (5 ft 9 in)
- Position: Midfielder

Team information
- Current team: San Lorenzo (on loan from Talleres)

Youth career
- Quilmes
- Racing Club
- 2020: Haro Deportivo

Senior career*
Years	Team	Apps	(Gls)
2021	Talleres (RdE)	14	(1)
2022	Defensores de Belgrano	28	(0)
2023	Quilmes	31	(4)
2024–2026	Querétaro	15	(0)
2025	→ Banfield (loan)	31	(5)
2026	Banfield	0	(0)
2026–	Talleres	9	(1)
2026–	→ San Lorenzo (loan)	7	(0)
- * Club domestic league appearances and goals as of 18:07, 21 November 2026 (UTC)

Martín Río is an Argentine professional footballer who plays as a midfielder for San Lorenzo, on loan from Talleres.

== Career ==
=== Early career ===
Río began his career at an early age, joining the youth team of Quilmes and later going on to join Racing Club.

In 2020, aged 19, he joined Haro Deportivo in the Segunda División B, the third tier of the Spanish football league system. He did not make his debut, however, and was released after six months at the club.

=== Talleres (RdE) ===
In 2021, Río returned to Argentina to sign for third-tier side Talleres (RdE). He made his debut on 15 June in the 1–1 draw against Defensores Unidos on the 13th matchday of the Apertura tournament, coming on as a second-half substitute for Ignacio Ruano. He scored his first and only goal for the club in the 4–2 loss against Comunicaciones on 19 December.

=== Defensores de Belgrano ===
In January 2022, Río was announced a new signing for Defensores de Belgrano in the Primera Nacional. He made his debut on 12 February in a 1–1 draw against Flandria, coming on as a substitute for Agustín Benítez.

=== Quilmes ===
In 2023, Río returned to Quilmes. He went on to play 31 games for the club and scored 4 goals.

=== Querétaro ===
On 9 January 2024, Río again left Argentina and signed for Liga MX club Querétaro as a free agent.
