= Agustín Lagos =

Argentine footballer

Personal information
- Full name: Agustín Lagos
- Date of birth: 9 October 2001 (age 25)
- Place of birth: La Cañada, Argentina
- Position: Right-back

Team information
- Current team: Platense (on loan from Vélez Sarsfield)
- Number: 4

Youth career
- Atlético Tucumán

Senior career*
Years	Team	Apps	(Gls)
2020–2024	Atlético Tucumán	35	(0)
2024–	Vélez Sarsfield	20	(1)
2026–	→ Platense (loan)	18	(0)
- * Club domestic league appearances and goals as of 17:05, 22 November 2026 (UTC)

Agustín Lagos (born 8 October 2001) is an Argentine professional footballer who plays as a right-back for Platense, on loan from Vélez Sarsfield.

== Professional career ==
Lagos made his professional debut with Atlético Tucumán in a 2-2 Argentine Primera División tie with Lanús on 23 February 2020.

On 17 July, Lagos joined Vélez Sarsfield, signing a three-year contract.

== Career statistics ==
As of 26 September 2022.

Club statistics
Club	Division	League			Cup		Continental		Total	
Club	Division	Season	Apps	Goals	Apps	Goals	Apps	Goals	Apps	Goals
Atlético Tucumán	Primera División	2019-20	1	0	0	0	—		1	0
Atlético Tucumán	Primera División	2020-21	1	0	1	0	1	0	3	0
Atlético Tucumán	Primera División	2021	15	0	0	0	—		15	0
Atlético Tucumán	Primera División	2022	1	0	0	0	—		1	0
Atlético Tucumán	Primera División	2023	0	0	0	0	—		0	0
Career total			18	0	1	0	1	0	20	0

== Honours ==
Vélez Sarsfield

- Argentine Primera División: 2024
- Supercopa Internacional: 2024
