= Ramiro Di Luciano =

Argentine footballer (born 2004)

Personal information
- Full name: Ramiro Sebastián Di Luciano
- Date of birth: 21 January 2004 (age 22)
- Place of birth: Banfield, Argentina
- Height: 1.66 m (5 ft 5 in)
- Position: Right back

Team information
- Current team: Čukarički (on loan from CSKA Moscow)
- Number: 22

Youth career
- –2024: Banfield

Senior career*
Years	Team	Apps	(Gls)
2021–2025	Banfield	30	(0)
2025–	CSKA Moscow	2	(0)
2026–	→ Čukarički (loan)	0	(0)
- * Club domestic league appearances and goals as of 22 September 2025

Ramiro Sebastián Di Luciano (born 21 January 2004) is an Argentine professional footballer who plays as a right back for Serbian SuperLiga club Čukarički, on loan from Russian Premier League club CSKA Moscow.

== Early life ==
Di Luciano was born on 21 January 2004. Born in Banfield, Argentina, he is a native of the city.

== Career ==
As a youth player, Di Luciano joined the youth academy of Argentine side Banfield and was promoted to the club's senior team in 2021, where he made thirty league appearances and scored three goals. Argentine news InfoRegión wrote in 2025 that he was "one of the most important players in their squad" while playing for them.

Following his stint there, he signed for Russian side CSKA during the summer of 2025.

== Style of play ==
Di Luciano plays as a defender. Right-footed, he has received comparisons to Argentina international Javier Zanetti.

== Career statistics ==
As of 22 September 2025

Club	Season	League			Cup		Other		Total	
Club	Season	Division	Apps	Goals	Apps	Goals	Apps	Goals	Apps	Goals
Banfield	2021	Argentine Primera División	0	0	–		2 (Note: Appearances in Copa de la Liga Profesional)	0	2	0
Banfield	2023	Argentine Primera División	0	0	0	0	–		0	0
Banfield	2024	Argentine Primera División	14	0	0	0	–		14	0
Banfield	2025	Argentine Primera División	16	0	2	0	–		18	0
Banfield	Total		30	0	2	0	2	0	34	0
CSKA	2025–26	Russian Premier League	2	0	1	0	–		3	0
Career total			32	0	3	0	2	0	37	0
