= Carlos Villalba =

Argentinian footballer

Personal information
- Full name: Carlos Gabriel Villalba Rivas
- Date of birth: 19 July 1998 (age 28)
- Place of birth: Resistencia, Argentina
- Height: 1.75 m (5 ft 9 in)
- Position: Midfielder

Team information
- Current team: Sarmiento (on loan from Talleres)
- Number: 25

Youth career
- Talleres

Senior career*
Years	Team	Apps	(Gls)
2019–	Talleres	0	(0)
2020–2021	→ Rentistas (loan)	36	(1)
2022	→ Platense (loan)	24	(0)
2023	→ Emelec (loan)	20	(1)
2024	→ Platense (loan)	29	(0)
2025–	→ Sarmiento (loan)	36	(3)
- * Club domestic league appearances and goals as of 17:53, 2 June 2026 (UTC)

Carlos Gabriel Villalba Rivas (born 19 July 1998) is an Argentinian footballer who plays as a midfielder for Sarmiento, on loan from Talleres in the Argentine Primera División.

== Career ==
=== Rentistas ===
After moving to the club on loan prior to the 2020 season, Villalba made his league debut for Rentistas on 16 February 2020, playing the entirety of a 2–0 home victory over Nacional. He scored his first and only goal for the club nearly a year later, the first in a 2–1 victory over Cerro Largo. Rentistas wished to extend the loan into June 2021 following its expiry in early 2021, but the two clubs couldn't reach a deal and he returned to Talleres.
