= Emilio Porro =

Argentine professional footballer

Personal information
- Full name: Emilio Agustín Porro
- Date of birth: 27 May 1996 (age 30)
- Place of birth: Buenos Aires, Argentina
- Height: 1.82 m (6 ft 0 in)
- Position: Defender

Team information
- Current team: Ferrocarril Midland

Youth career
- All Boys

Senior career*
Years	Team	Apps	(Gls)
2017–2019	All Boys	50	(2)
2019–2021	Independiente Rivadavia	3	(0)
2021	All Boys de Santa Rosa	5	(0)
2022	Excursionistas		
2023	Acassuso		
2023	San Lorenzo de Alem		
2024	Ferrocarril Midland	2	(0)
2025	Sportivo Italiano	36	(5)
2026–	Ferrocarril Midland	4	(1)
- * Club domestic league appearances and goals as of 16:52, 28 April 2026 (UTC)

Emilio Agustín Porro (born 27 May 1996) is an Argentine professional footballer who plays as a defender for Ferrocarril Midland in the Primera Nacional of Argentina.

== Career ==
Porro began with All Boys. The 2016–17 campaign saw him make the breakthrough into their senior squad, with Porro appearing for his debut on 26 March 2017 versus Boca Unidos. He scored his first goal during his second appearance, netting the opener of a 2–2 draw with Independiente Rivadavia on 1 April. Forty-five further appearances followed across his opening three campaigns, the latter of which was in Primera B Metropolitana after 2017–18 relegation, before he scored for the second time against Defensores Unidos in February 2019.

In October 2021, Porro moved to All Boys de Santa Rosa.

In 2026, I will return to Ferrocarril Midland to compete in the Primera Nacional of Argentina.

== Career statistics ==
As of 12 April 2019.

Appearances and goals by club, season and competition
Club	Season	League			Cup		Continental		Other		Total	
Club	Season	Division	Apps	Goals	Apps	Goals	Apps	Goals	Apps	Goals	Apps	Goals
All Boys	2016–17	Primera B Nacional	22	1	1	0	—		0	0	23	1
All Boys	2017–18	Primera B Nacional	11	0	0	0	—		0	0	11	0
All Boys	2018–19	Primera B Metropolitana	16	1	0	0	—		0	0	16	1
Career total			49	2	1	0	—		0	0	50	2
