= Maximiliano Rogoski =

Argentine professional footballer

Personal information
- Full name: Maximiliano Juan Rogoski
- Date of birth: 17 June 1994 (age 32)
- Place of birth: Argentina
- Position: Midfielder

Team information
- Current team: Ferrocarril Midland

Youth career
- Tigre

Senior career*
Years	Team	Apps	(Gls)
2015–2019	Leandro N. Alem	97	(11)
2019–	Ferrocarril Midland	134	(24)
2021	→ Arsenal de Sarandí (loan)	7	(0)
2023	→ Almagro (loan)	10	(0)
2024	→ Talleres RdE (loan)	12	(0)
- * Club domestic league appearances and goals as of 17:04, 28 April 2026 (UTC)

Maximiliano Juan Rogoski (born 17 June 1994) is an Argentine professional footballer who plays as a midfielder for Ferrocarril Midland.

== Career ==
Rogoski is a product of the Tigre academy. In 2015, the midfielder completed a move to Primera D Metropolitana team Leandro N. Alem. He scored three goals in thirty-five matches across 2015–16 and 2016–17 as the club won promotion as runners-up. In Primera C Metropolitana, Rogoski featured in sixty-two matches and netted eight goals in two seasons. Midway through 2019, Rogoski headed across the fourth tier to Ferrocarril Midland. Five goals in twenty-eight games occurred across the next eighteen months. In February 2021, Rogoski was signed on loan by Primera División side Arsenal de Sarandí.

Rogoski's top-flight debut arrived with Arsenal on 7 March 2021 during a 5–0 defeat at home to Estudiantes, as he replaced Ignacio Gariglio off the bench with twenty-four minutes remaining.

== Personal life ==
Born in Argentina, Rogoski is of Polish descent.

== Career statistics ==
As of 20 March 2021.

Appearances and goals by club, season and competition
Club	Season	League			Cup		League Cup		Continental		Other		Total	
Club	Season	Division	Apps	Goals	Apps	Goals	Apps	Goals	Apps	Goals	Apps	Goals	Apps	Goals
Ferrocarril Midland	2021	Primera C Metropolitana	0	0	0	0	—		—		0	0	0	0
Arsenal de Sarandí (loan)	2021 (Note: Soccerway counts Copa de la Liga Profesional appearances as league appearances.)	Primera División	1	0	0	0	—		—		0	0	1	0
Career total			1	0	0	0	—		—		0	0	1	0
