= Tres Lagunas =

- City
- Location of Tres Lagunas in Argentina
- Coordinates: 25°12′57″S 58°30′40″W
- Country: Argentina
- Province: Formosa

Government
  - mayor: José Guillermo Silva

Population
  - Total: 1,237 (as of 2,001)
- Time zone: UTC−3 (ART)
- CPA base: P3611
- Dialing code: 3717
- Climate: Cfa
- Website: www.treslagunas.gov.ar/

Tres Lagunas is a city in Formosa Province, Argentina. As of the 2001 INDEC census, the population was 1,237 and was an increase from 1991 census of 612 population.
