= Sebastián Zunino =

Argentine football referee

- Full name: Sebastián Alejandro Zunino
- Born: 21 January 1988 (age 38); Ramos Mejía, Buenos Aires Province, Argentina

Domestic
Years	League	Role
2022–	Argentine Primera División	Referee

International
Years	League	Role
2024–	FIFA	Referee

Sebastián Zunino (born 21 January 1988 in Ramos Mejía, Buenos Aires Province, Argentina) is an Argentine football referee. He officiates in the Argentine Primera División and was added to the FIFA International Referees List in 2024.

== Refereeing career ==
Zunino made his debut in the Argentine top flight on 27 January 2023, taking charge of the Liga Profesional match between Godoy Cruz and Platense in Mendoza. He was assisted by Ernesto Callegari and Juan Del Fueyo, with Franco Morón serving as fourth official. The fixture marked the opening round of the 2023 season and was Zunino's first match at Primera División level.

Prior to his promotion to the top division, Zunino officiated matches in lower categories of Argentine football, including the Primera Nacional, and has accumulated numerous appearances across domestic competitions since his professional debut. In recognition of his performances, he was added to the FIFA International Referees List in 2024, alongside fellow Argentine referee Nazareno Arasa.
