= Luciano Recalde =

Argentine footballer

Personal information
- Full name: Luciano Leonel Recalde
- Date of birth: 12 August 1995 (age 31)
- Place of birth: Granadero Baigorria, Argentina
- Height: 1.84 m (6 ft 1/2 in)
- Position: Centre-back

Team information
- Current team: Quilmes

Youth career
- Rosario Central

Senior career*
Years	Team	Apps	(Gls)
2016–2019	Rosario Central	3	(0)
2016–2017	→ Villa Dálmine (loan)	19	(0)
2019–2021	Platense	40	(2)
2022–2023	Cienciano	34	(0)
2023–2024	Deportivo Cuenca	28	(0)
2024–2025	Banfield	13	(0)
2025–2026	San Martín SJ	22	(0)
2026–	Quilmes	8	(0)
- * Club domestic league appearances and goals as of 17:26, 18 April 2026 (UTC)

Luciano Leonel Recalde (born 12 August 1995) is an Argentine professional footballer who plays as a centre-back for Quilmes.

== Career ==
Recalde's career got underway with Rosario Central of the Argentine Primera División. In January 2016, Recalde completed a loan move to Primera B Nacional team Villa Dálmine. A victory over Juventud Unida on 19 March marked his professional career debut, which was the first of five appearances during 2016. He remained with Villa Dálmine for the following campaign, 2016–17, and participated in fourteen further matches. January 2018 saw Recalde make his debut for Rosario Central, playing the full ninety minutes of a match with Gimnasia y Esgrima on 29 January.

== Career statistics ==
As of 18 May 2018.

Club statistics
Club	Season	League			Cup (Note: Includes the Copa Argentina)		League Cup		Continental (Note: Includes the Copa Libertadores and Copa Sudamericana)		Other		Total	
Club	Season	Division	Apps	Goals	Apps	Goals	Apps	Goals	Apps	Goals	Apps	Goals	Apps	Goals
Rosario Central	2016	Primera División	0	0	0	0	—		0	0	0	0	0	0
Rosario Central	2016–17	Primera División	0	0	0	0	—		—		0	0	0	0
Rosario Central	2017–18	Primera División	3	0	0	0	—		0	0	0	0	3	0
Rosario Central	Total		3	0	0	0	—		0	0	0	0	3	0
Villa Dálmine (loan)	2016	Primera B Nacional	5	0	0	0	—		—		0	0	5	0
Villa Dálmine (loan)	2016–17	Primera B Nacional	14	0	0	0	—		—		0	0	14	0
Villa Dálmine (loan)	Total		19	0	0	0	—		—		0	0	19	0
Career total			22	0	0	0	—		0	0	0	0	22	0
