= Tomás Nasif =

Argentine footballer (born 2004)

Personal information
- Date of birth: 2 January 2005 (age 21)
- Place of birth: Villa del Totoral, Córdoba
- Height: 1.85 m (6 ft 1 in)
- Position: Forward

Team information
- Current team: Platense (on loan from River Plate)
- Number: 9

Youth career
- 2015–2025: River Plate

Senior career*
Years	Team	Apps	(Gls)
2025–	River Plate	0	(0)
2025	→ Banfield (loan)	8	(3)
2026–	→ Platense (loan)	12	(2)
- * Club domestic league appearances and goals

Tomás Nasif (born 2 January 2004) is an Argentine professional association football player who plays as a striker for Argentine Primera División club Platense, on loan from River Plate.

== Club career ==
=== River Plate ===
Nasif emerged from Club Atlético River Plate's academy, where he arrived in 2015 when he was 11 years old.

On 2024 he became known after being top scorer in the Torneo Proyección, where River Plate's reserve squad became champions, after beating San Lorenzo and also winning the Trofeo de Campeones after beating Vélez where Nasif also scored.

=== Banfield ===
Despite his good season in 2024, he is not considered by Marcelo Gallardo for River's senior team due to the large number of forwards that River already had, so in January 2025 he went on loan to Banfield for one year without a buy option.

Nasif made his official debut on 23 January 2025, in a match against Defensa y Justicia for the 2025 Torneo Apertura. In his first match, he scored the only goal, giving Banfield the victory. In the following match against Newell's Old Boys, Banfield won 3–0 at home, with the young striker scoring a brace and providing an assist.

In a league match against Club Atlético Belgrano, he suffered a sprained left ankle, which would sideline him for several months. He left the game in the final minutes and was replaced by Marcos Arturia.

=== Platense ===
After playing only 9 matches in all of 2025 due to his injury, he signed a contract with Club Atlético Platense on 7 January 2026, on a 12-month loan without a fee or purchase option.

On 26 January 2026, he scored his first goal for Platense in a match against Instituto de Córdoba of the 2026 Torneo Apertura.

== Career statistics ==
=== Club ===
As of match played 7 May 2026.

Club	Division	Season	League		National cups ^{(1)}		Continental ^{(2)}		Total	
Club	Division	Season	Apps	Goals	Apps	Goals	Apps	Goals	Apps	Goals
Banfield	1.ª	2025	8	3	1	0	Inexistentes		9	3
Banfield	Total		8	3	1	0	0	0	9	3
Platense	1.ª	2026	12	2	1	0	3	1	16	3
Platense	Total		12	2	1	0	3	1	16	3
Career total			20	5	2	0	3	1	25	6
^{(1)} Includes Copa Argentina.^{(2)} Includes Copa Libertadores and Copa Sudamericana.
