= Agustín Hausch =

Argentine footballer

Personal information
- Full name: Agustín Hausch
- Date of birth: 21 May 2003 (age 23)
- Place of birth: Baradero, Argentina
- Height: 1.77 m (5 ft 10 in)
- Position: Forward

Team information
- Current team: Defensa y Justicia
- Number: 17

Youth career
- 2007–2020: San Lorenzo

Senior career*
Years	Team	Apps	(Gls)
2020–2025	San Lorenzo	13	(0)
2025–	Defensa y Justicia	24	(1)

International career
2019	Argentina U16	5	(1)
- * Club domestic league appearances and goals as of 17:05, 10 May 2026 (UTC)

Agustín Hausch (born 21 May 2003) is an Argentine professional footballer who plays as a forward for Defensa y Justicia.

== Professional career ==
On 5 July 2019, Hausch signed his first professional contract with San Lorenzo. Hausch made his professional debut with San Lorenzo in a 1-0 Argentine Primera División loss to Racing Club on 22 February 2020.

On 3 January 2025, Hausch joined Defensa y Justicia, signing a three-year contract.

== International career ==
Hausch is a youth international for Argentina, first representing the Argentina U16s in 2019.
