= Tomás Fernández (footballer, born 1998) =

Argentine footballer

Personal information
- Full name: Aldo Tomás Luján Fernández
- Date of birth: 11 February 1998 (age 28)
- Place of birth: Junín, Argentina
- Height: 1.73 m (5 ft 8 in)
- Position: Winger

Team information
- Current team: Aldosivi
- Number: 27

Youth career
- Ambos Mundos
- Boca Juniors

Senior career*
Years	Team	Apps	(Gls)
2018–2026	Boca Juniors	0	(0)
2018–2019	→ Agropecuario (loan)	13	(0)
2019–2021	→ Cerro Largo (loan)	40	(6)
2021	→ Tigre (loan)	19	(5)
2022	→ San Martín SJ (loan)	27	(4)
2023	→ Deportivo Maldonado (loan)	29	(7)
2024–2025	→ San Martín SJ (loan)	45	(7)
2026–	Aldosivi	18	(3)
- * Club domestic league appearances and goals as of 17:51, 6 November 2026 (UTC)

Aldo Tomás Luján Fernández (born 11 February 1998) is an Argentine professional footballer who plays as a winger for Aldosivi.

== Career ==
Fernández started his career with local team Ambos Mundos, before joining Boca Juniors; via a trial with Barcelona. Primera B Nacional side Agropecuario completed the loan signing of Fernández on 10 August 2018, with the forward making his professional debut for the newly promoted side on 31 August against Instituto. A 1–1 draw with Temperley on 15 September saw Fernández start for the first time in senior football.

== Career statistics ==
As of 2 November 2018.

Club statistics
Club	Season	League			Cup (Note: Includes the Copa Argentina)		League Cup		Continental (Note: Includes the Copa Libertadores)		Other		Total	
Club	Season	Division	Apps	Goals	Apps	Goals	Apps	Goals	Apps	Goals	Apps	Goals	Apps	Goals
Boca Juniors	2018–19	Primera División	0	0	0	0	—		0	0	0	0	0	0
Agropecuario (loan)	2018–19	Primera B Nacional	4	0	0	0	—		—		0	0	4	0
Career total			4	0	0	0	—		0	0	0	0	4	0
