= Federico Anselmo =

Argentine footballer (born 1994)

Personal information
- Full name: Federico Marcelo Anselmo
- Date of birth: 11 June 1994 (age 32)
- Place of birth: Las Acequias, Argentina
- Height: 1.86 m (6 ft 1 in)
- Position: Forward

Team information
- Current team: Banfield
- Number: 30

Youth career
- –2010: Talleres
- 2010–2014: Estudiantes

Senior career*
Years	Team	Apps	(Gls)
2014–2016	Estudiantes	6	(0)
2016	→ Rafaela (loan)	14	(5)
2016–2018	Unión Santa Fe	17	(1)
2017	→ Argentinos Juniors (loan)	3	(0)
2018–2019	Quilmes	22	(9)
2019–2020	Santa Fe	15	(0)
2020–2021	Palestino	4	(1)
2021–2022	Quilmes	31	(8)
2022–2023	Maldonado	19	(2)
2023–2024	Quilmes	35	(11)
2024–2025	Universitatea Cluj	18	(3)
2025–2026	San Martín SJ	17	(1)
2026–	Banfield	10	(0)
- * Club domestic league appearances and goals as of 17:56, 8 November 2026 (UTC)

Federico Marcelo Anselmo (born 17 April 1994) is an Argentine professional footballer who plays as a forward for Banfield.
