= Tomás Adoryán =

Footballer (born 2001)

Personal information
- Full name: Tomás Alexander Adoryán
- Date of birth: 22 September 2001 (age 25)
- Place of birth: San Pedro, Argentina
- Height: 1.77 m (5 ft 10 in)
- Position: Winger

Team information
- Current team: Banfield
- Number: 20

Youth career
- Banfield

Senior career*
| Years | Team | Apps | (Gls) |
| 2023– | Banfield | 50 | (3) |
| 2023–2024 | → Rampla Juniors (loan) | 43 | (5) |

International career^{‡}
| 2025– | Armenia | 2 | (0) |
- * Club domestic league appearances and goals as of 17:53, 8 November 2026 (UTC) ‡ National team caps and goals as of 9 June 2025

Tomás Alexander Adoryán (Armenian: Թոմաս Ալեքսանդր Ադորյան; born 22 September 2001) is a professional footballer who plays as a winger for Argentine Primera División club Banfield. Born in Argentina, he represents the Armenia national team.

== Club career ==
Born in the province of Misiones, he began playing football at the local Guaraní Antonio Franco and Crucero del Norte, joining Banfield at the age of 16.

On 9 March 2023, he made his debut for Banfield in Argentine Primera División.

In July 2023 he was loaned for a year to Uruguayan Rampla Juniors.

== International career ==
Born in Argentina, Adoryán is of Armenian descent through his great-grandfather.

In May 2025, he received his first call-up to the Armenia national team for a friendly matches against Kosovo and Montenegro.

Adoryán made his debut for the Armenia national team on 6 June 2025 in a friendly match against Kosovo.

== Career statistics ==
=== International ===
As of 9 June 2025

Armenia
| Year | Apps | Goals |
|---|---|---|
| 2025 | 2 | 0 |
| Total | 2 | 0 |
