= Gerónimo Rivera =

Argentine footballer

Personal information
- Full name: Luciano Gerónimo Rivera Flores
- Date of birth: 18 August 2003 (age 23)
- Place of birth: Temperley, Buenos Aires, Argentina
- Height: 1.68 m (5 ft 6 in)
- Position: Winger

Team information
- Current team: Al-Wahda
- Number: 17

Youth career
- Bartolomé Mitre
- Presidente Quintana
- 2011–2012: Lanús
- 2012–2022: Banfield

Senior career*
Years	Team	Apps	(Gls)
2023–2025	Banfield	64	(8)
2025–	Al-Wahda	5	(0)
- * Club domestic league appearances and goals as of 16 March 2026

Luciano Gerónimo Rivera Flores (born 18 August 2003), known as Gerónimo Rivera, is an Argentine football player who plays as a winger for UAE Pro League club Al-Wahda.

== Career ==
Born in Villa Sastre neighbourhood, Temperley, Argentina, Rivera played for the local clubs Bartolomé Mitre and Presidente Quintana before joining Lanús youth system. Shortly after, he joined the Banfield.

He signed his first professional contract in May 2023 and made his debut on 3 June in an Argentine Primera División match against Racing Club by replacing Emanuel Coronel at the minute 87. He scored by first time in September of the same year against Instituto.

On 12 July 2025, Banfield announced that they had sold 50% of his transfer to UAE Pro League side Al-Wahda for a fee around $2 million.

== Personal life ==
His parents are Gabriela, a housekeeper, and José, a builder.

Rivera is of Chilean descent since his paternal grandmother is Chilean. Despite he is eligible to play for both Argentina and Chile, he has stated his desire to represent his country of birth.

== Style of play ==
A left-footed winger inclined to offensive positions on both sides of the field, he can also operate as an attacking midfielder or second striker.
