= Sebastián González (footballer, born 1992) =

Argentine footballer

Sebastián Emanuel González Valdéz (born March 4, 1992) is an Argentine professional footballer who plays as a midfielder for San Martín SJ. He played for the Argentina U-17 in the FIFA U-17 World Cup Nigeria 2009.

== Teams ==
- (Argentina) San Lorenzo 2008–2013
- (Chile) Unión La Calera (loan) 2012–2013
- (Ecuador) Deportivo Cuenca 2013–2015
- (Chile) Everton 2015–2017
- (Chile) San Marcos de Arica 2017
- (Argentina) Ferro Carril Oeste 2018–2020
- (Argentina) Estudiantes BA 2020–2021
- (Argentina) San Martín SJ 2022–present
