= Turdera =

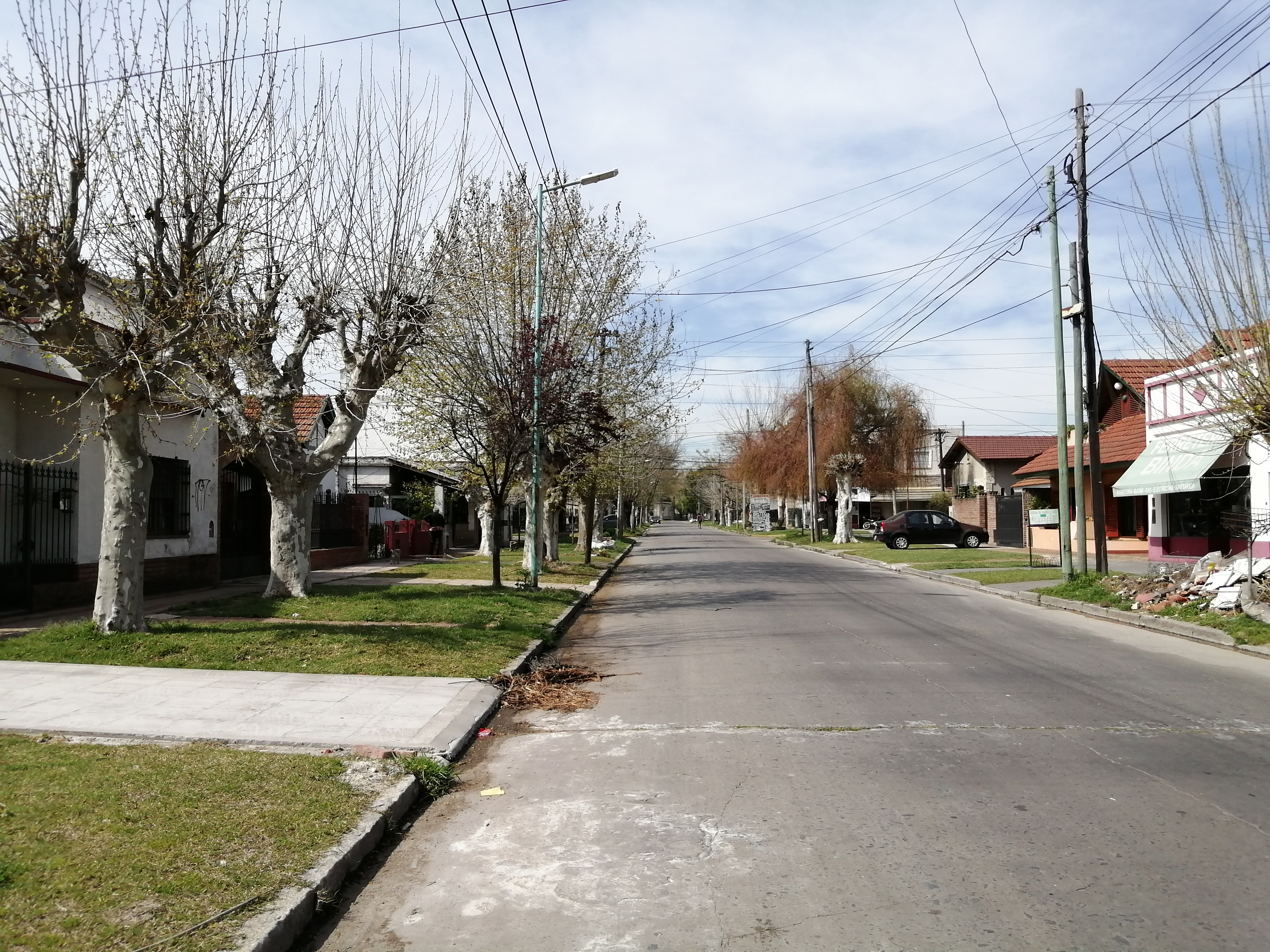
- Riego Núñez Street, Turdera.

- Location in Greater Buenos Aires
- Coordinates: 34°46′S 58°23′W
- Country: Argentina
- Province: Buenos Aires
- Partido: Lomas de Zamora
- Founded: 30 January 1910
- Elevation: 20 m (66 ft)

Population (2001 census [INDEC])
  - Total: 9,786
  - Density: 4,660/km^{2} (12,100/sq mi)
- CPA Base: B 1834
- Area code: +54 11

Turdera is a small district (localidad) of Lomas de Zamora Partido in Buenos Aires Province, Argentina. It forms part of the urban conurbation of Greater Buenos Aires.

Turdera only has an area of 2.1 km^{2} (0.81 sq mi), and is located between the much larger localidades of Temperley, Llavallol and Adrogué.
