= Nicolás Laméndola =

Argentine footballer

Personal information
- Full name: Nicolás Emanuel Laméndola
- Date of birth: 12 December 1998 (age 27)
- Place of birth: Argentina
- Height: 1.78 m (5 ft 10 in)
- Position: Midfielder

Team information
- Current team: Tucumán
- Number: 23

Youth career
- Tucumán

Senior career*
Years	Team	Apps	(Gls)
2020–	Tucumán	73	(6)
2022–2023	→ Rafaela (loan)	47	(4)
2024	→ Aldosivi (loan)	31	(4)
- * Club domestic league appearances and goals as of 17:38, 9 November 2026 (UTC)

Nicolás Emanuel Laméndola (born 12 December 1998) is an Argentine professional footballer who plays as a midfielder for Atlético Tucumán.

== Career ==
Laméndola came through the youth ranks at Atlético Tucumán. He was promoted into their senior set-up in early 2020, as he appeared on the substitute's bench for a Primera División home draw with Lanús on 22 February. He didn't come on that day, as he didn't for five further matches across the next year; including for a Copa Sudamericana encounter with Independiente in November. Laméndola's senior debut arrived on 6 March 2021 during a Copa de la Liga Profesional group stage away defeat against Lanús. On 30 May 2022, Laméndola joined Primera Nacional club Atlético de Rafaela on a loan deal until the end of December 2023.

== Career statistics ==
As of 16 March 2021.

Appearances and goals by club, season and competition
Club	Season	League			Cup		League Cup		Continental		Other		Total	
Club	Season	Division	Apps	Goals	Apps	Goals	Apps	Goals	Apps	Goals	Apps	Goals	Apps	Goals
Atlético Tucumán	2019–20	Primera División	0	0	0	0	0	0	0	0	0	0	0	0
Atlético Tucumán	2020–21 (Note: Soccerway counts 2020 Copa de la Liga Profesional appearances as league appearances.)	Primera División	0	0	0	0	0	0	0	0	0	0	0	0
Atlético Tucumán	2021 (Note: Soccerway counts 2021 Copa de la Liga Profesional appearances as league appearances.)	Primera División	2	0	0	0	—		—		0	0	2	0
Career total			2	0	0	0	0	0	0	0	0	0	2	0
