= David Gallardo =

Argentine footballer

Personal information
- Full name: Jonathan David Gallardo
- Date of birth: 28 February 1997 (age 29)
- Place of birth: Cañada de Gómez, Argentina
- Height: 1.80 m (5 ft 11 in)
- Position: Left winger

Team information
- Current team: Gimnasia Jujuy (on loan from Sarmiento)

Youth career
- Las Parejas

Senior career*
Years	Team	Apps	(Gls)
2013–2021	Las Parejas	57	(6)
2015	→ Unión Santa Fe (loan)	0	(0)
2018–2020	→ Villa Dálmine (loan)	24	(0)
2020–2021	→ Tigre (loan)	2	(0)
2021	→ Ferro Carril Oeste (loan)	36	(4)
2022–	Sarmiento	37	(0)
2023	→ Guaraní (loan)	14	(0)
2024	→ Ferro (loan)	9	(0)
2025	→ Agropecuario (loan)	6	(0)
2025	→ Mitre (loan)	15	(0)
2026–	→ Gimnasia Jujuy (loan)	8	(1)
- * Club domestic league appearances and goals as of 17:35, 28 April 2026 (UTC)

Jonathan David Gallardo (born 28 February 1997) is an Argentine professional footballer who plays as a left winger for Gimnasia Jujuy, on loan from Sarmiento.

== Career ==
Gallardo started his career with Sportivo Las Parejas. He began featuring for their first-team at the age of sixteen, featuring five times in Torneo Argentino B campaigns in 2013 and 2014. In January 2014, Gallardo had trials in Chilean football. His parent club won promotion in the following 2015 campaign, though Gallardo didn't play for them as he spent the year out on loan in Primera División side Unión Santa Fe's youth. Seven goals, including two against Gimnasia y Esgrima, in sixty-four fixtures back with Sportivo Las Parejas in all competitions subsequently came in the 2016, 2016–17 and 2017–18 tier three seasons.

Ahead of 2018–19, Gallardo completed a loan move to Primera B Nacional's Villa Dálmine; penning a season-long deal in May 2018. His bow for Villa Dálmine arrived on 28 July in the Copa Argentina against River Plate, which preceded his league debut in September versus Chacarita Juniors. He remained for the 2019–20 campaign, where he took his overall tally for the club to twenty-six games. He returned to Sportivo Las Parejas on 30 June 2020.

After loan spells at Tigre and Ferro Carril Oeste, Gallardo finally left Sportivo Las Parejas to join newly promoted Argentine Primera División club Sarmiento in January 2022 on a deal until the end of 2025.

== Career statistics ==
As of 9 July 2020.

Appearances and goals by club, season and competition
Club	Season	League			Cup		League Cup		Continental		Other		Total	
Club	Season	Division	Apps	Goals	Apps	Goals	Apps	Goals	Apps	Goals	Apps	Goals	Apps	Goals
Sportivo Las Parejas	2015	Torneo Federal A	0	0	0	0	—		—		0	0	0	0
Sportivo Las Parejas	2016	Torneo Federal A	9	1	0	0	—		—		0	0	9	1
Sportivo Las Parejas	2016–17	Torneo Federal A	20	2	3	1	—		—		2 (Note: Appearance(s) in the Torneo Federal A play-offs)	0	25	3
Sportivo Las Parejas	2017–18	Torneo Federal A	28	3	2	0	—		—		0	0	30	3
Sportivo Las Parejas	2018–19	Torneo Federal A	0	0	0	0	—		—		0	0	0	0
Sportivo Las Parejas	2019–20	Torneo Federal A	0	0	0	0	—		—		0	0	0	0
Sportivo Las Parejas	Total		57	6	5	1	—		—		2	0	64	7
Unión Santa Fe (loan)	2015	Primera División	0	0	0	0	—		—		0	0	0	0
Villa Dálmine (loan)	2018–19	Primera B Nacional	9	0	2	0	—		—		0	0	11	0
Villa Dálmine (loan)	2019–20	Primera B Nacional	15	0	0	0	—		—		0	0	15	0
Villa Dálmine (loan)	Total		24	0	2	0	—		—		0	0	26	0
Career total			63	6	7	1	—		—		2	0	72	7
