= Marco Iacobellis =

Argentine footballer

Personal information
- Full name: Marco Iacobellis Nahara
- Date of birth: 27 December 1999 (age 26)
- Place of birth: Fonavi, Argentina
- Height: 1.72 m (5 ft 8 in)
- Position: Forward

Team information
- Current team: Central Córdoba SdE (on loan from All Boys)
- Number: 10

Youth career
- Huracán
- 2015–2017: Platense
- 2017–2019: All Boys

Senior career*
Years	Team	Apps	(Gls)
2019–	All Boys	86	(6)
2024	→ Barracas Central (loan)	25	(2)
2025	→ San Martín SJ (loan)	20	(2)
2026–	→ Central Córdoba SdE (loan)	26	(1)
- * Club domestic league appearances and goals as of 17:19, 12 November 2026 (UTC)

Marco Iacobellis Nahara (born 27 December 1999) is an Argentine professional footballer who plays as a forward for Central Córdoba SdE, on loan from All Boys.

== Career ==
Iacobellis had a youth spell with Huracán up until 2015, with a two-year stint with Platense subsequently arriving before he joined the youth ranks of All Boys in 2017. Iacobellis made the breakthrough into senior football in March 2019, as Pablo Solchaga selected him off the substitutes bench during a Copa Argentina win away to Primera B Nacional's Sarmiento on 27 March.

== Career statistics ==
As of 18 April 2019.

Appearances and goals by club, season and competition
Club	Season	League			Cup		Continental		Other		Total	
Club	Season	Division	Apps	Goals	Apps	Goals	Apps	Goals	Apps	Goals	Apps	Goals
All Boys	2018–19	Primera B Metropolitana	0	0	1	0	—		0	0	1	0
Career total			0	0	1	0	—		0	0	1	0
