= Club Ferrocarril Midland =

Ferrocarril Midland
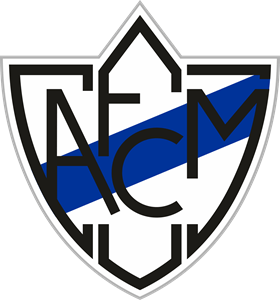
- Full name: Club Atlético Ferrocarril Midland
- Nickname: Funebreros
- Founded: 26 April 1914; 112 years ago
- Ground: Estadio Ferrocarril Midland, Libertad, Merlo Partido
- Capacity: 3,600
- Chairman: Agustín Orión
- Manager: Joaquín Iturrería
- League: Primera B
- 2025: 1° (Champion)
Home colours	Away colours	Third colours

Club Atlético Ferrocarril Midland is an Argentine football club based in the Libertad district of Merlo Partido, in the Greater Buenos Aires. The team currently plays in Primera Nacional, the second division of the Argentine football league system.

== History ==
The club was founded on June 28, 1914 by workers of the Buenos Aires Midland Railway with the objective to participate in some sports and other social activities. In 1929 the club was divided into two divisions: "Club Midland" and "Club Atlético Libertad", but they were reunited in 1933. After the merger, it was decided that club's colours would be white and blue.

Midland competed in the regional divisions until 1960 when the club gained its affiliation to the Argentine Football Association. One year later Midland started competing in the lowest league, Primera D Metropolitana. Between 1988 and 1989 Midland set a South American record reaching a mark of 50 consecutive games being undefeated. As a consequence of that notable campaign, the team won the Primera D title promoting to Primera C Metropolitana.

The club had a short run in the Primera C during the 1990s and even came to play in the Primera B after winning the Torneo Reducido in 1996.

In 2008-09 the team won the Primera D championship (their 3rd. title), therefore it was promoted to play in the Primera C Metropolitana. In 2023 Midland defeated Liniers 5–2 on goal difference, promoting to Primera B Metro for the second time in club's history.

In November 2025 Midland promoted to the second division of Argentina, Primera Nacional, after being crowned champion of the 2025 Primera B Metropolitana entire season. As Midland won both, Apertura and Clausura tournaments, the club secured promotion to the upper division.

== Rivalries ==
Midland's main rivals are Ituzaingó, Deportivo Merlo and Argentino Merlo, due to the fact that their stadiums are located close to each other.

== Players ==
=== Current squad ===
As of 8 March 2026 Note: Flags indicate national team as defined under FIFA eligibility rules; some limited exceptions apply. Players may hold more than one non-FIFA nationality.

No.	Pos.	Nation	Player
1	GK	ARG	Mauro Leguiza
2	DF	ARG	Genaro Cepeda
3	DF	ARG	Pablo Casarico
4	DF	ARG	Rodrigo Figueroa
5	MF	ARG	Maximiliano Rogoski (captain)
6	DF	ARG	Fernando González
7	MF	ARG	Dylan Aguilar
8	FW	ARG	Elías Torancio
9	FW	ARG	Rodrigo Cao
10	MF	ARG	Matías Abruzzese
11	FW	ARG	Agustín Campana
12	GK	ARG	Santiago Garcia Rossi
13	DF	ARG	Leonel Gigli
14	DF	ARG	Emilio Porro
15	MF	ARG	Jesús Camaño
16	DF	ARG	Mariano Penepil
17	MF	ARG	Matías Flores

No.	Pos.	Nation	Player
18	MF	ARG	Valentín Gargiulo
19	FW	ARG	Jeremías Perales
20	MF	ARG	Juan Cruz Vega
21	FW	ARG	Valentino Madalón
22	GK	ARG	Lucas Escobar
23	FW	ARG	Lucas Vicó
24	DF	ARG	Tomás Muia
25	DF	ARG	Pedro Castorani
26	DF	ARG	Joel Canalda (on loan from Instituto de Córdoba)
27	DF	ARG	Lautaro Díaz Laharque
28	MF	ARG	Nicolás Violini
29	MF	ARG	Marcos Roseti
31	FW	ARG	Santino Primante
32	MF	ARG	Gonzalo Emanuel Gómez
33	MF	ARG	Mauro Frattini
34	FW	ARG	Diago Guzmán (on loan from Instituto de Córdoba)

=== Reserve squad ===
Note: Flags indicate national team as defined under FIFA eligibility rules; some limited exceptions apply. Players may hold more than one non-FIFA nationality.

No.	Pos.	Nation	Player
41	DF	ARG	Mirko Olavarría

=== Out on loan ===
Note: Flags indicate national team as defined under FIFA eligibility rules; some limited exceptions apply. Players may hold more than one non-FIFA nationality.

No.	Pos.	Nation	Player
35	DF	ARG	Jeremías Kruger (at Talleres de Remedios de Escalada until 31 December 2026)
36	FW	ARG	Gonzalo Ariel Gómez (at Dock Sud until 31 December 2026)

== Titles ==
- Primera D (3): 1968, 1988–89, 2008–09
- Primera B Metropolitana (1): 2025
