= Gabriel Compagnucci =

Argentine footballer

Personal information
- Full name: Gabriel Carlos Compagnucci
- Date of birth: 29 August 1991 (age 35)
- Place of birth: Monte Buey, Argentina
- Height: 1.79 m (5 ft 10 in)
- Positions: Right-back; right midfielder

Team information
- Current team: Atlético Tucumán
- Number: 28

Youth career
- –2011: Sportivo Belgrano

Senior career*
Years	Team	Apps	(Gls)
2011	Sportivo Belgrano	1	(0)
2011–2013	Tiro Federal de Morteros	9	(0)
2014–2016	Douglas Haig	24	(0)
2016–2017	Alvarado	39	(6)
2017–2018	Almagro	24	(4)
2018	Unión Santa Fe	2	(0)
2019–2020	Patronato	29	(0)
2020–2021	Tigre	18	(1)
2021–2022	Newell's Old Boys	18	(1)
2022–2023	Belgrano	43	(1)
2023–2024	FC U Craiova	31	(0)
2024–2026	Belgrano	45	(1)
2026–	Atlético Tucumán	20	(0)
- * Club domestic league appearances and goals as of 17:40, 9 November 2026 (UTC)

Gabriel Carlos Compagnucci (born 29 August 1991) is an Argentine professional footballer who plays as a right-back or right midfielder for Atlético Tucumán.

== Career ==
Sportivo Belgrano were Compagnucci's first senior club, he featured once for them in the 2010–11 Torneo Argentino A. In 2011, Compagnucci joined Torneo Argentino B's Tiro Federal, with the midfielder subsequently remaining for one campaign whilst making nine appearances before departing in 2012. Two years later, in 2014, Douglas Haig of Primera B Nacional signed Compagnucci. He made his professional debut against Ferro Carril Oeste on 17 August, which was the first of twenty-five appearances for Douglas Haig. Compagnucci signed for Torneo Federal A team Alvarado in January 2016. Eight goals in forty-six games followed.

Compagnucci agreed to join Almagro for the 2017–18 Primera B Nacional campaign. He netted four goals, including two in one match with All Boys on 15 October 2017, as Almagro narrowly missed out on promotion after losing a championship play-off to Aldosivi. On 23 July 2018, Argentine Primera División side Unión Santa Fe completed the signing of Compagnucci. His first appearance in top-flight football arrived on 20 August against San Martín. Compagnucci terminated his contract in December, prior to joining Patronato on 1 January 2019.

On 27 June 2023, it was announced that Compagnucci was transferred to FC U Craiova in Romania. It was the Argentinian's first experience in Europe. On 13 May 2024, a day after the club's last-place finish and relegation to Liga II was confirmed, Compagnucci left FC U Craiova by mutual consent.

Compagnucci returned to Belgrano in June 2024, signing a contract until the end of 2025.

== Career statistics ==
As of 21 August 2024.

Club statistics
Club	Season	League			Cup (Note: Includes the Copa Argentina)		League Cup		Continental		Other		Total	
Club	Season	Division	Apps	Goals	Apps	Goals	Apps	Goals	Apps	Goals	Apps	Goals	Apps	Goals
Sportivo Belgrano	2010–11	Torneo Argentino A	1	0	0	0	—		—		—		1	0
Tiro Federal	2011–12	Torneo Argentino B	9	0	0	0	—		—		—		9	0
Douglas Haig	2014	Primera B Nacional	13	0	0	0	—		—		—		13	0
Douglas Haig	2015	Primera B Nacional	11	0	1	0	—		—		—		12	0
Douglas Haig	Total		24	0	1	0	—		—		—		25	0
Alvarado	2016	Torneo Federal A	12	3	0	0	—		—		4 (Note: Four appearances in the 2016 Torneo Federal A play-offs)	1 (Note: One goal in the 2016 Torneo Federal A play-offs)	16	4
Alvarado	2016–17	Torneo Federal A	27	3	2	1	—		—		1 (Note: One appearance in the 2016–17 Torneo Federal A play-offs)	0	30	4
Alvarado	Total		39	6	2	1	—		—		5	1	46	8
Almagro	2017–18	Primera B Nacional	24	4	0	0	—		—		2 (Note: Two appearances in the 2017–18 Primera B Nacional play-offs)	0	26	4
Unión Santa Fe	2018–19	Primera División	2	0	1	0	—		—		—		3	0
Patronato	2018–19	Primera División	10	0	0	0	—		—		1	0	0	0
Patronato	2019–20	Primera División	19	0	0	0	1	0	—		4	0	24	0
Patronato	Total		29	0	0	0	1	0	—		5	0	35	0
Tigre	2020	Primera Nacional	7	1	1	0	—		—		—		8	1
Tigre	2021	Primera Nacional	11	0	0	0	—		—		—		11	0
Tigre	Total		18	1	1	0	—		—		—		19	1
Newell's Old Boys	2021	Primera División	18	1	0	0	—		—		—		18	1
Belgrano	2022	Primera Nacional	25	1	1	0	—		—		—		3	0
Belgrano	2023	Primera División	18	0	1	0	—		—		—		3	0
Belgrano	Total		43	1	2	0	—		—		—		45	1
FC U Craiova	2023–24	Liga I	31	0	4	0	—		—		—		35	0
Belgrano	2024	Primera División	3	0	0	0	—		—		—		3	0
Career total			241	13	11	1	1	0	—		12	1	265	15

== Honours ==
Belgrano

- Primera Nacional: 2022
