= Club Atlético Sarmiento =

Argentine sports club

Sarmiento
- Full name: Club Atlético Sarmiento
- Nicknames: Verde; Verdolaga
- Founded: 1 April 1911; 115 years ago
- Ground: Estadio Eva Perón
- Capacity: 22,000
- Chairman: Fernando Chiófalo
- Manager: Facundo Sava
- League: Primera División
- 2023: 23rd
- Website: clubatleticosarmiento.com
Home colours	Away colours	Third colours

Club Atlético Sarmiento is an Argentine sports club based in Junín, Buenos Aires Province, Argentina. The club currently competes in Primera División, the top division of the Argentine football league system.

Founded in 1911 and affiliated to AFA in 1952, Sarmiento had two earlier stints in the Primera División (1981, 1982, 2015, 2016, and 2016–2017) before being promoted again before the 2021 season. The team's highest final position in the Primera División was 13th (of 18 teams) in 1981.

== Players ==
=== Current squad ===
As of 23 September 2026

Note: Flags indicate national team as defined under FIFA eligibility rules; some limited exceptions apply. Players may hold more than one non-FIFA nationality.

No.	Pos.	Nation	Player
1	GK	COL	Iván Arboleda
2	DF	ARG	Juan Manuel Insaurralde (captain)
3	DF	ARG	Lucas Suárez (on loan from Talleres)
4	DF	ARG	Juan Manuel Cabrera (on loan from Argentinos Juniors)
5	MF	ARG	Manuel García
6	DF	ARG	Gastón Arturia (on loan from Unión Santa Fe)
7	FW	ARG	Pablo Magnín
8	MF	ARG	Santiago Salle (on loan from Independiente)
9	FW	ARG	Diego Churín
10	FW	COL	Jhon Rentería
12	GK	ARG	Thyago Ayala
14	MF	ARG	Mauricio Martínez
15	MF	ARG	Cristian Zabala
17	DF	ARG	Jeremías Vallejos
18	MF	PAR	Osmar Giménez
19	FW	ARG	Julián Contrera (on loan from Newell's Old Boys)

No.	Pos.	Nation	Player
20	DF	ARG	Ulises Giménez (on loan from River Plate)
21	MF	ARG	Julián Mavilla (on loan from Belgrano)
22	FW	ARG	Gastón González (on loan from Defensa y Justicia)
23	MF	ARG	Elián Giménez
24	FW	ARG	Jonathan Herrera (on loan from Deportivo Riestra)
25	MF	ARG	Carlos Villalba (on loan from Talleres)
26	FW	ARG	Yair Arismendi
27	FW	PAR	Junior Marabel (on loan from Unión Santa Fe)
29	DF	ARG	Thiago Santamaría (on loan from Argentinos Juniors)
33	DF	ARG	Gabriel Díaz
34	DF	ARG	Agustín Seyral
39	DF	ARG	Joel Godoy
40	FW	ARG	Brandon Márquez
44	DF	URU	Renzo Orihuela (on loan from Montevideo City)
77	DF	ARG	Nicolás Pasquini

=== Reserve squad ===
Note: Flags indicate national team as defined under FIFA eligibility rules; some limited exceptions apply. Players may hold more than one non-FIFA nationality.

No.	Pos.	Nation	Player
23	GK	ARG	Danilo Monza
35	MF	ARG	Facundo Alaggia

No.	Pos.	Nation	Player
37	FW	ARG	Renzo Lobianco

=== Out on loan ===
Note: Flags indicate national team as defined under FIFA eligibility rules; some limited exceptions apply. Players may hold more than one non-FIFA nationality.

No.	Pos.	Nation	Player
16	DF	URU	Federico Andueza (at Progreso until 31 December 2026)
30	FW	ARG	David Gallardo (at Gimnasia Jujuy until 31 December 2026)

No.	Pos.	Nation	Player
31	FW	ARG	Benjamín Borasi (at San Martín de Tucumán until 31 December 2026)
36	DF	ARG	Santiago Morales (at Aucas until 31 December 2026)

== Honours ==
- Primera Nacional (1): 2020
- Primera B Metropolitana (2): 1980, 2003–04, 2011–12
- Primera C (1): 1977
