= San Martín de San Juan =

San Martín (San Juan)
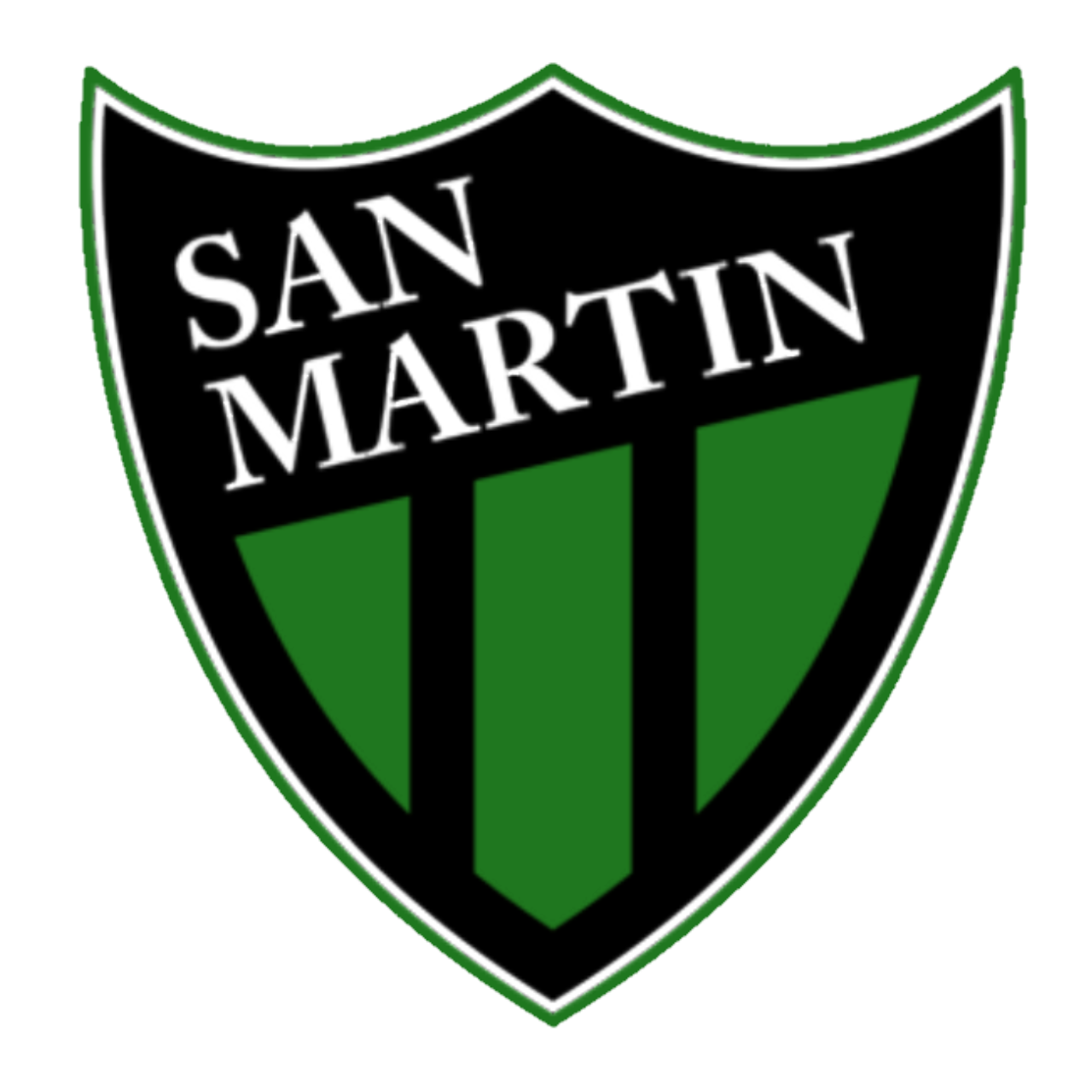
- Full name: Club Atlético San Martín
- Nickname: Verdinegro (Green-Blacks) Santo (Saint)
- Founded: 27 September 1907; 119 years ago
- Ground: Estadio Ingeniero Hilario Sánchez, San Juan, Argentina
- Capacity: 25,000
- Chairman: Jorge Miadosqui
- Manager: Alejandro Schiapparelli
- League: Primera Nacional
- 2025: 30th (relegated)
Home colours	Away colours	Third colours

Club Atlético San Martín, mostly known as San Martín de San Juan, is an Argentine football club from the city of San Juan. The team currently plays in the Primera Nacional, the second division of the Argentine football league system.

It was founded on 27 September 1907 and is considered the best club of the San Juan Province.

== History ==
Before 2015, San Martín had only played four seasons in the Argentine top flight. Its first appearance was in the 1970 Nacional championship, finishing bottom of the group after winning only four of 20 games. It again played in the Argentine First Division in the 2007–08 season being relegated immediately the next season. The squad gained the promotion to the first division for the third time during the 2010–11 season, after beating Gimnasia y Esgrima (LP) 1–0 and later 1–1 on aggregate in the play-off for the second automatic promotion place. The team was relegated during the 2013 Torneo Final.

The team were promoted to the first division in 2014, after finishing 2nd place in the league table. They secured their promotion on the final match-day, when they beat Ferro Carril Oeste 3–0.

San Martín played in the Argentine First Division from 2015 to 2019. The tournament was expanded to include 30 teams in 2015. It avoided relegation by placing 17th in the 2015 season, 13th in the 2016 season, 22nd in the 2016–17 season, and 18th in the 2017–18 season The team were relegated in the 2018–19 season. Although they finished 21st out of 26, they finished 24th in the average league table for coefficients, meaning they were relegated.

It currently plays most matches in the Estadio Ingeniero Hilario Sánchez, which has capacity for 19,000 spectators. It sometimes plays major games (notably against Boca Juniors and River Plate) in the Estadio San Juan del Bicentenario, which has capacity for 25,000 spectators.

== Uniforms ==
Since its foundation, the club has always worn a green and black kit. However, in 2002, they used a lighter-colored green for only one season, going black to the standard green and black.

Kit Manufacturers
Period	Manufacturer
1980–1982	Sportlandia
1983–1989	Adidas
1990	Uhlsport
1991–1992	Adidas
1993–1995	Puma
1995–1997	Lotto
1997–1999	Reusch
1999–2001	Kelme
2001–2002	Reusch
2002–2003	Ultra
2003–2005	Sport 2000
2006–2022	Mitre
2023–present	Fiume Sport

== Players ==
=== Current squad ===
As of 12 June 2025

Note: Flags indicate national team as defined under FIFA eligibility rules; some limited exceptions apply. Players may hold more than one non-FIFA nationality.

No.	Pos.	Nation	Player
1	GK	ARG	Matías Borgogno
2	DF	ARG	Rodrigo Cáseres
3	MF	ARG	Dante Álvarez
4	DF	ARG	Alejandro Molina
5	MF	ARG	Nicolás Pelaitay (captain)
6	DF	ARG	Luciano Recalde
8	FW	ARG	Horacio Tijanovich
9	FW	ARG	Federico González
10	MF	ARG	Sebastián González
11	FW	ARG	Ezequiel Montagna
12	GK	ARG	Federico Bonansea
13	GK	ARG	Maximiliano Velazco
14	DF	ARG	Damián Adín (loan from Dock Sud)
15	MF	ARG	Juan Cavallaro
16	FW	ARG	Ayrton Portillo (loan from Defensa y Justicia)
17	MF	ARG	Lucas Acosta
18	MF	ARG	Gastón Moreyra (loan from Godoy Cruz)

No.	Pos.	Nation	Player
19	MF	ARG	Tomás Escalante (loan from Defensa y Justicia)
20	DF	ARG	Esteban Burgos
21	MF	ARG	Nicolás Watson (loan from Huracán)
22	MF	ARG	Sebastián Jaurena
23	MF	ARG	Gino Olguín (loan from Villa Dálmine)
24	FW	VEN	Edwuin Pernía
25	FW	ARG	Franco Toloza
26	DF	ARG	Hernán Lópes
27	FW	ARG	Tomás Fernández (loan from Boca Juniors)
28	MF	ARG	Marco Iacobellis (loan from All Boys)
29	DF	ARG	Tomás Lecanda (loan from Tigre)
30	DF	ARG	Lucas Diarte (loan from Belgrano)
31	DF	ARG	Gonzalo Lucero
32	FW	ARG	Federico Anselmo
37	FW	ARG	Jonathan Menéndez
49	MF	ARG	Diego González

== Managers ==
- (Argentina) Dalcio Giovagnini (1999)
- (Argentina) Néstor Craviotto (2000)
- (Argentina) Ricardo Zielinski (2001)
- (Argentina) Roque Alfaro (2005)
- (Argentina) Julio César Toresani (Jan 2005–June 6)
- (Bolivia) Gustavo Quinteros (2006–07)
- (Argentina) Fernando Quiroz (2007–08)
- (Argentina) Néstor Craviotto (Jan 2009–June 9)
- (Argentina) Enrique Hrabina (July 2009–March 10)
- (Argentina) Fernando Quiroz (March 2010–June 10)
- (Argentina) Darío Franco (June 2010–March 11)
- (Argentina) Daniel Garnero (March 2011–April 12)
- (Argentina) Facundo Sava (April 2012–Sept 12)
- (Argentina) Gabriel Perrone (Sept 2012–March 13)
- (Argentina) Rubén Forestello (2013–14)
- (Argentina) Carlos Mayor (2015)
- (Argentina) Pablo Lavallén (2015–2016)
- (Argentina) Néstor Gorosito (2016–2018)
- (Argentina) Walter Coyette (2018–2019)
- (Argentina) Alfredo Grelak (2019–2020)

== Honours ==
=== National ===
- Torneo del Interior
  - Winners (3): 1990–91, 1992–93, 1994–95

=== Regional ===
- Campeonato de San Juan
  - Winners (4):1910, 1917, 1919, 1920
- Liga Sanjuanina de Fútbol
  - Winners (26): 1921, 1924, 1926, 1932, 1937, 1940, 1941, 1943, 1948, 1951, 1954, 1955, 1956, 1957, 1960, 1964, 1967, 1969, 1977, 1980, 1989, 1990, 1992, 1994, 1995, 2012
