= 2025 Independiente Rivadavia season =

Independiente Rivadavia
2025 season
- Chairman: Daniel Vila
- Manager: Alfredo Berti
- Stadium: Estadio Bautista Gargantini
- Torneo Apertura: Round of 16
- Torneo Clausura: 10th
- Copa Argentina: Champions
- Average home league attendance: 23,147
Home colours	Away colours

The 2025 season is the 110th for Club Sportivo Independiente Rivadavia and their 2nd consecutive season in the Primera División. The club will also participate in the Copa Argentina.

== Squad ==
=== Transfers In ===
Pos.	Player	Transferred from	Fee	Date	Source
DF	(Argentina) Pedro Souto	(Argentina) Temperley	Loan	13 January 2025	
MF	(Argentina) Leonel Bucca	(Portugal) Estrela Amadora	Free	11 June 2025	
FW	(Paraguay) Álex Arce	(Ecuador) LDU Quito	Undisclosed	4 July 2025	

=== Transfers Out ===
Pos.	Player	Transferred to	Fee	Date	Source
FW	(Argentina) Emiliano Saliadarre	(Argentina) Racing	Loan return	31 December 2024	
MF	(Argentina) Franco Romero	(Argentina) Defensa y Justicia	Loan return	31 December 2024	
DF	(Argentina) Tobías Ostchega	(Argentina) Belgrano	Loan return	31 December 2024	
MF	(Argentina) Agustín Mulet	(Argentina) Vélez Sarsfield	Loan return	31 December 2024	
DF	(Argentina) Bruno Bianchi	(Argentina) Atlético Tucumán	Loan return	31 December 2024	
DF	(Argentina) Imanol Segovia	(Argentina) Racing	Loan return	31 December 2024	
MF	(Argentina) Lautaro Ríos	(Argentina) Banfield	Loan return	31 December 2024	
MF	(Argentina) Diego Tonetto		Released	1 January 2025	
FW	(Argentina) Victorio Ramis		Released	1 January 2025	
DF	(Argentina) Luciano Abecasis		Released	1 January 2025	
DF	(Paraguay) Fredy Vera	(Paraguay) Sportivo Ameliano	Free	1 January 2025	
GK	(Argentina) Gonzalo Marinelli		Released	1 January 2025	
MF	(Syria) Ezequiel Ham	(Argentina) Unión de Santa Fe	Free	4 January 2025	
MF	(Argentina) Antonio Napolitano	(Argentina) Chacarita Juniors	Free	7 January 2025	
DF	(Argentina) Esteban Burgos	(Argentina) San Martín de San Juan	Free	16 January 2025	
MF	(Argentina) Juan Cavallaro	(Argentina) San Martín de San Juan	Free	18 January 2025	
DF	(Argentina) Matías Ruiz Díaz	(Argentina) Estudiantes de Río Cuarto	Free	20 January 2025	
FW	(Argentina) Federico Castro	(Argentina) Patronato	Free	20 January 2025	
FW	(Argentina) Mauricio Asenjo	(Argentina) Los Andes	Free	22 January 2025	
DF	(Argentina) Nahuel Gallardo	(Ecuador) Delfín	Free	27 January 2025	
DF	(Argentina) Federico Milo	(Argentina) Temperley	Free	31 January 2025	
MF	(Argentina) Gonzalo Ríos	(Argentina) Banfield	Loan (+US$85,000)	6 February 2025	
FW	(Paraguay) Jorge Sanguina	(Argentina) Colón	Undisclosed	6 February 2025	
MF	(Argentina) Gonzalo Álvez	(Argentina) Talleres	Loan return	31 May 2025	
MF	(Argentina) Luis Sequeira	(Argentina) Talleres	Loan return	30 June 2025	
FW	(Paraguay) Fernando Romero	(Paraguay) Sportivo Trinidense	Undisclosed	1 July 2025	
FW	(Paraguay) Iván Valdez	(Paraguay) Nacional	Loan	11 July 2025	

== Competitions ==
=== Overall record ===
Competition	First match	Last match	Starting round	Final position	Record							
Competition	First match	Last match	Starting round	Final position	Pld	W	D	L	GF	GA	GD	Win %
Torneo Apertura	23 January 2025	11 May 2025	Matchday 1	Round of 16	17	7	6	4	20	18	+2	41.18
Torneo Clausura	13 July 2025		Matchday 1		14	2	6	6	12	17	−5	14.29
Copa Argentina	16 April 2025	5 November 2025	Round of 64	Winner	6	3	3	0	10	6	+4	50.00
Total					37	12	15	10	42	41	+1	32.43

Last updated: 5 November 2025
Source: Competitions

=== Primera División ===
==== Torneo Apertura ====
===== League table =====
Pos	Team	Pld	W	D	L	GF	GA	GD	Pts	Qualification
4	Huracán	16	7	6	3	19	12	+7	27	Advance to round of 16
5	Tigre	16	8	3	5	18	12	+6	27	Advance to round of 16
6	Independiente Rivadavia	16	7	6	3	20	17	+3	27	Advance to round of 16
7	Barracas Central	16	7	5	4	20	18	+2	26	Advance to round of 16
8	Estudiantes (LP)	16	5	6	5	18	19	−1	21	Advance to round of 16

Source: AFA

===== Results by round =====
Round	1	2	3	4	5	6	7	8	9	10	11	12	13	14	15	16
Ground	A	H	A	H	A	H	A	H	H	A	H	A	A	H	A	H
Result	W	D	W	D	L	L	D	D	W	L	W	D	D	W	W	W
Position	4	5	2	5	7	10	10	10	9	10	9	8	9	6	6	6

A = Away; H = Home; W = Win; D = Draw; L = Loss

===== Matches =====
23 January 2025 1	Newell's Old Boys	0–1	Independiente Rivadavia	Rosario
21:30 UTC−3

28 January 2025 2	Independiente Rivadavia	0–0	Barracas Central

3 February 2025 3	Belgrano	0–3	Independiente Rivadavia

7 February 2025 4	Independiente Rivadavia	2–2	Estudiantes

11 February 2025 5	Boca Juniors	2–0	Independiente Rivadavia

15 February 2025 6	Independiente Rivadavia	1–4	Tigre

24 February 2025 7	Argentinos Juniors	0–0	Independiente Rivadavia

2 March 2025 8	Independiente Rivadavia	1–1	Lanús

10 March 2025 9	Independiente Rivadavia	2–0	Unión

15 March 2025 10	Huracán	2–0	Independiente Rivadavia

27 March 2025 11	Independiente Rivadavia	2–1	Racing

5 April 2025 12	Godoy Cruz	1–1	Independiente Rivadavia

11 April 2025 13	Banfield	1–1	Independiente Rivadavia

22 April 2025 14	Independiente Rivadavia	1–0	Aldosivi

28 April 2025 15	Central Córdoba	1–2	Independiente Rivadavia

2 May 2025 16	Independiente Rivadavia	3–2	Defensa y Justicia

===== Final stages =====
11 May 2025 Round of 16	Independiente	1–0	Independiente Rivadavia	Avellaneda
15:30	Montiel 56'	Report		Stadium: Libertadores de América; Referee: Hernán Mastángelo

==== Torneo Clausura ====
===== League table =====
Pos	Team	Pld	W	D	L	GF	GA	GD	Pts
11	Huracán	16	5	5	6	10	15	−5	20
12	Defensa y Justicia	16	5	4	7	14	19	−5	19
13	Aldosivi	16	5	3	8	13	18	−5	18
14	Independiente Rivadavia	16	3	7	6	14	17	−3	16
15	Newell's Old Boys	16	3	5	8	13	23	−10	14

Source: AFA

===== Matches =====
13 July 2025 1	Independiente Rivadavia	1–2	Newell's Old Boys	Mendoza
21:30 UTC−3	Studer 31'	Report	González 71'; Banega 88'	Stadium: Estadio Bautista Gargantini

20 July 2025 2	Barracas Central	0–3	Independiente Rivadavia	Buenos Aires
14:30 UTC−3		Report	Retamar 48', 52'; Arce 90+1'	Stadium: Estadio Claudio Chiqui Tapia

25 July 2025 3	Independiente Rivadavia	0–0	Belgrano	Mendoza
21:15 UTC−3		Report		Stadium: Estadio Bautista Gargantini

7 August 2025 4	Estudiantes	2–1	Independiente Rivadavia	La Plata
21:00 UTC−3	Pérez 8'; González Pírez 40'	Report	Villa 90+4'	Stadium: Estadio Jorge Luis Hirschi

17 August 2025 5	Independiente Rivadavia	0–3	Boca Juniors	Mendoza
20:30 UTC−3		Report	Centurión 29' (o.g.); Zeballos 87'; Velasco 89'	Stadium: Bautista Gargantini; Referee: Pablo Dóvalo

22 August 2025 6	Tigre	1–1	Independiente Rivadavia	Victoria
20:00 UTC−3	Martínez 90+12' (pen.)	Report	Amarfil 71'	Stadium: Estadio José Dellagiovanna

30 August 2025 7	Independiente Rivadavia	2–1	Argentinos Juniors	Mendoza
17:00 UTC−3	Sartori 5'; Fernández 17'	Report	López 10'	Stadium: Estadio Bautista Gargantini

12 September 2025 8	Lanús	1–0	Independiente Rivadavia	Lanús
21:15 UTC−3	Bou 56'	Report		Stadium: Estadio Ciudad de Lanús; Referee: Hernán Mastrángelo

=== Copa Argentina ===
16 April 2025 Round of 64	Independiente Rivadavia	1–0	Estudiantes (BA)	La Punta
16:10	Osella 16'	Report		Stadium: Provincial Juan Gilberto Funes; Referee: Fernando Echenique

2 July 2025 Round of 32	Platense	2–2 (1–3 p)	Independiente Rivadavia	Rosario
21:15	Picco 44'; Mainero 77' (pen.)	Report	Villa 11' (pen.); Retamar 55'	Stadium: Marcelo Bielsa; Referee: Pablo Dóvalo
	Penalties
	Vázquez (penalty missed); Mainero (penalty missed); Schor (penalty scored); Saborido (penalty missed)		(penalty missed) Studer; (penalty scored) Fernández; (penalty scored) Barbieri; (penalty scored) Cardillo

30 July 2025 Round of 16	Independiente Rivadavia	2–1	Central Córdoba (R)	La Punta
15:30	Villalba 44'; Cardillo 90+9'	Report	Marín 29'	Stadium: Provincial Juan Gilberto Funes; Referee: Pablo Echavarría

5 September 2025 Quarter-finals	Tigre	1–3	Independiente Rivadavia	Rosario
21:10	Saralegui 20'	Report	Fernández 14'; Sartori 73'; Bonifacio 88'	Stadium: Marcelo Bielsa; Referee: Pablo Dóvalo

24 October 2025 Semi-finals	Independiente Rivadavia	0–0 (4–3 p)	River Plate	Córdoba
22:10		Report		Stadium: Mario Alberto Kempes; Referee: Andrés Gariano
	Penalties
	Gómez (penalty scored); Costa (penalty missed); Sartori (penalty scored); Studer (penalty scored); Villa (penalty scored)		(penalty missed) Borja; (penalty missed) Galoppo; (penalty scored) Colidio; (penalty scored) Meza; (penalty scored) Montiel

5 November 2025 Final	Independiente Rivadavia	2–2 (5–3 p)	Argentinos Juniors	Córdoba
21:10	Arce 8'; Fernández 62'	Report	Lescano 63'; Godoy 90+7'	Stadium: Estadio Monumental Presidente Perón; Referee: Nicolás Ramírez
	Penalties
	Gómez (penalty scored); Villalba (penalty scored); Retamar (penalty scored); Studer (penalty scored); Villa (penalty scored)		(penalty scored) Lescano; (penalty scored) López Muñoz; (penalty scored) Giaccone; (penalty missed) Molina
