= 2025 Copa Argentina final =

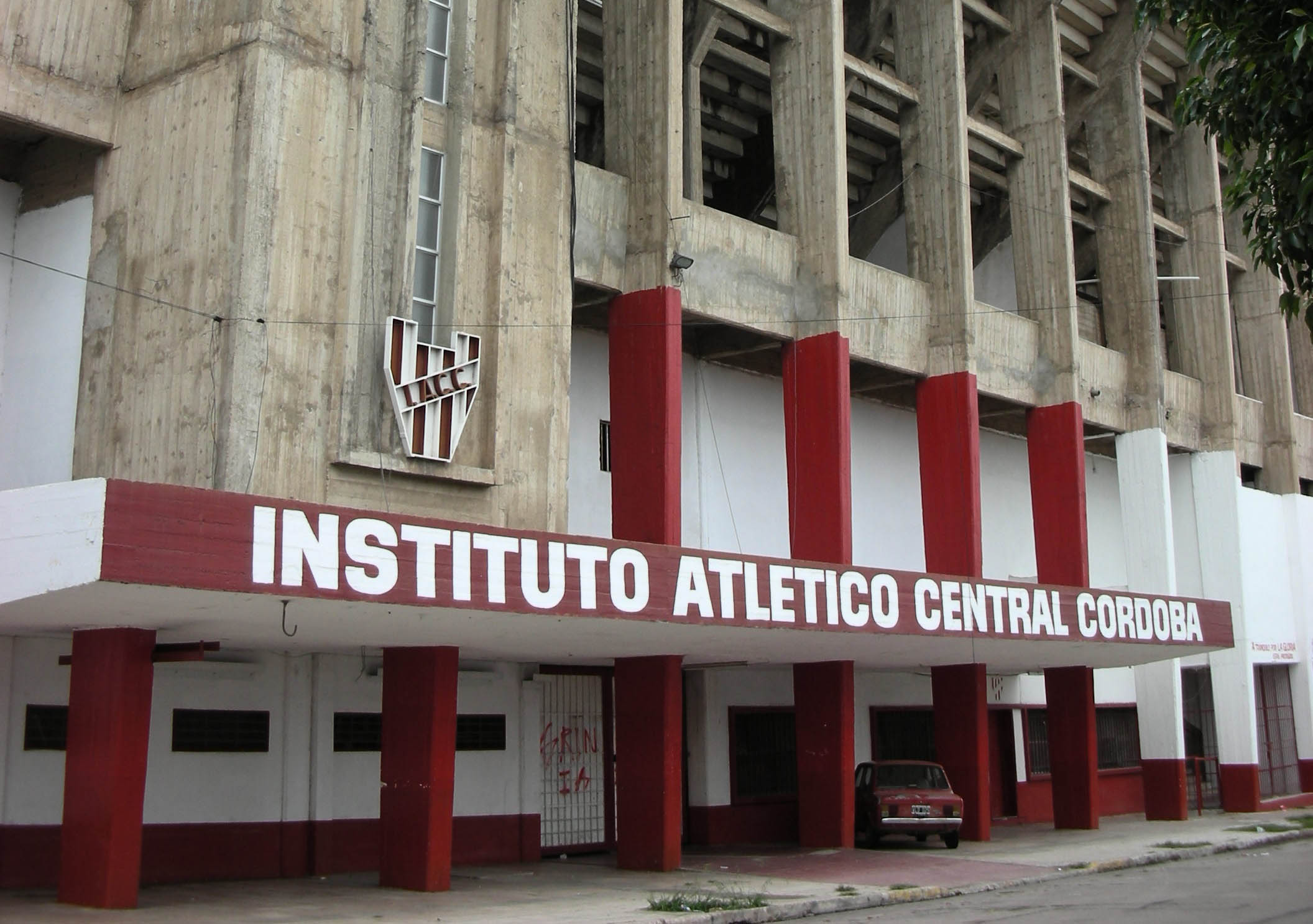
- Estadio Monumental Presidente Perón, venue
- Event: 2025 Copa Argentina
Independiente Rivadavia	Argentinos Juniors
2	2
- Independiente Rivadavia won 5–3 on penalties
- Date: 5 November 2025
- Venue: Estadio Monumental Presidente Perón, Córdoba
- Man of the Match: Sebastián Villa (Independiente Rivadavia)
- Referee: Nicolás Ramírez

The 2025 Copa Argentina final was the 63rd and final match of the 2025 Copa Argentina. It was played on 5 November 2025 at Estadio Monumental Presidente Perón in Córdoba between Independiente Rivadavia and Argentinos Juniors. Nicolás Ramírez was the referee for the match, which was the first in the tournament's history to use a video assistant referee (VAR).

On 11 October 2025, Diego Rodríguez, the starting goalkeeper for Argentinos Juniors, suffered an ACL injury in his right knee. Although the registration deadline had passed, Argentinos Juniors was permitted to register Sergio Romero as their new goalkeeper after he terminated his contract with Boca Juniors. Romero started in goal for the Copa Argentina semifinal and final.

Independiente Rivadavia defeated Argentinos Juniors in the final on penalties to win their first tournament title. As winners, Independiente Rivadavia qualified for the group stage of the 2026 Copa Libertadores and earned the right to play the winners of the 2025 Trofeo de Campeones in the 2025 Supercopa Argentina.

== Qualified teams ==
Team	Previous finals app.
Independiente Rivadavia	None
Argentinos Juniors	None

== Road to the final ==
Independiente Rivadavia			Round	Argentinos Juniors		
Opponent	Venue	Score		Opponent	Venue	Score
Estudiantes (BA)	La Punta	1–0	Round of 64	Central Norte	Caseros	3–0
Platense	Rosario	2–2 (3–1 p)	Round of 32	Excursionistas	Bajo Flores	3–0
Central Córdoba (R)	La Punta	2–1	Round of 16	Aldosivi	Florencio Varela	2–1
Tigre	Rosario	3–1	Quarter-finals	Lanús	Avellaneda	1–0
River Plate	Córdoba	0–0 (4–3 p)	Semi-finals	Belgrano	Rosario	2–1

== Match details ==
5 November 2025
21:10

Independiente Rivadavia	2–2	Argentinos Juniors
Arce 8'; Fernández 62'	Report	Lescano 63'; Godoy 90+7'
Penalties
Gómez (penalty scored); Villalba (penalty scored); Retamar (penalty scored); Studer (penalty scored); Villa (penalty scored)	5–3	(penalty scored) Lescano; (penalty scored) López Muñoz; (penalty scored) Giaccone; (penalty missed) Molina

Estadio Monumental Presidente Perón, Córdoba
Referee: Nicolás Ramírez

Independiente Rivadavia	Argentinos Juniors

GK	1	(Argentina) Ezequiel Centurión		(substituted off) 89'
DF	42	(Argentina) Sheyko Studer
DF	2	(Uruguay) Leonard Costa
DF	13	(Argentina) Alejo Osella	(yellow card) 59' (yellow-red card) 90+1'
MF	21	(Argentina) Mauricio Cardillo		(substituted off) 90'
MF	5	(Argentina) Tomás Bottari
MF	25	(Argentina) Maximiliano Amarfil	(yellow card) 5' (yellow-red card) 41'
MF	14	(Argentina) Luciano Gómez
MF	26	(Argentina) Matías Fernández	(yellow card) 20'	(substituted off) 65'
FW	22	(Colombia) Sebastián Villa (c)	(yellow card) 22'
FW	9	(Paraguay) Álex Arce	(yellow card) 69'	(substituted off) 69'
Substitutions:
GK	23	(Argentina) Gonzalo Marinelli		(substituted on) 89'
DF	4	(Argentina) Mauro Peinipil
DF	31	(Argentina) Matías Valenti
DF	36	(Argentina) Ezequiel Bonifacio
DF	40	(Paraguay) Iván Villalba	(yellow card) 72'	(substituted on) 69'
MF	8	(Argentina) Leonel Bucca
MF	11	(Argentina) Diego Tonetto		(substituted on) 90'
FW	7	(Argentina) Victorio Ramis
FW	18	(Colombia) Santiago Muñoz
FW	34	(Argentina) Nicolás Retamar		(substituted on) 65'
FW	43	(Argentina) Fabrizio Sartori
FW	44	(Argentina) Matías Bergara
Manager:
(Argentina) Alfredo Berti			(red card) 76'

GK	44	(Argentina) Sergio Romero
DF	22	(Uruguay) Leandro Lozano		(substituted off) 90+2'
DF	16	(Argentina) Francisco Álvarez	(yellow card) 51'
DF	25	(Argentina) Román Riquelme		(substituted off) 67'
DF	21	(Argentina) Gabriel Florentín		(substituted off) 46'
DF	20	(Argentina) Sebastián Prieto	(yellow card) 28'	(substituted off) 46'
MF	10	(Argentina) Alan Lescano (c)
MF	24	(Argentina) Federico Fattori		(substituted off) 71'
MF	23	(Argentina) Hernán López Muñoz
FW	27	(Argentina) Tomás Molina
FW	47	(Argentina) Diego Porcel
Substitutions:
GK	12	(Argentina) Gonzalo Siri
DF	2	(Argentina) Tobías Ramírez
DF	4	(Argentina) Érik Godoy		(substituted on) 90+2'
DF	14	(Argentina) Kevin Coronel
DF	26	(Argentina) Claudio Bravo
MF	7	(Argentina) Lautaro Giaccone		(substituted on) 46'
MF	8	(Argentina) Lucas Gómez
MF	11	(Argentina) Nicolás Oroz
MF	29	(Argentina) Emiliano Viveros		(substituted on) 46'
FW	18	(Argentina) Ismael Sosa		(substituted on) 67'
FW	19	(Uruguay) Rubén Bentancourt		(substituted on) 71'
FW	42	(Argentina) Lautaro Ovando
Manager:
(Argentina) Nicolás Diez

Man of the Match:
(Colombia) Sebastián Villa (Independiente Rivadavia)

Assistant referees:
Adrián Delbarba
Walter Ferreyra
Fourth official:
Fabrizio Llobet
Fifth official:
Eduardo Lucero
Video assistant referee:
Héctor Paletta
Assistant video assistant referees:
Pablo Dóvalo

Match rules

- 90 minutes.
- Penalty shoot-out if scores still level.
- Twelve named substitutes.
- Maximum of five substitutions.

=== Statistics ===
Overall
	Independiente Rivadavia	Argentinos Juniors
Goals scored	2	2
Total shots	8	22
Shots on target	6	19
Ball possession	23%	77%
Corner kicks	1	9
Fouls committed	17	9
Offsides	4	1
Yellow cards	8	2
Red cards	3	0
