= 2025 Supercopa Argentina =

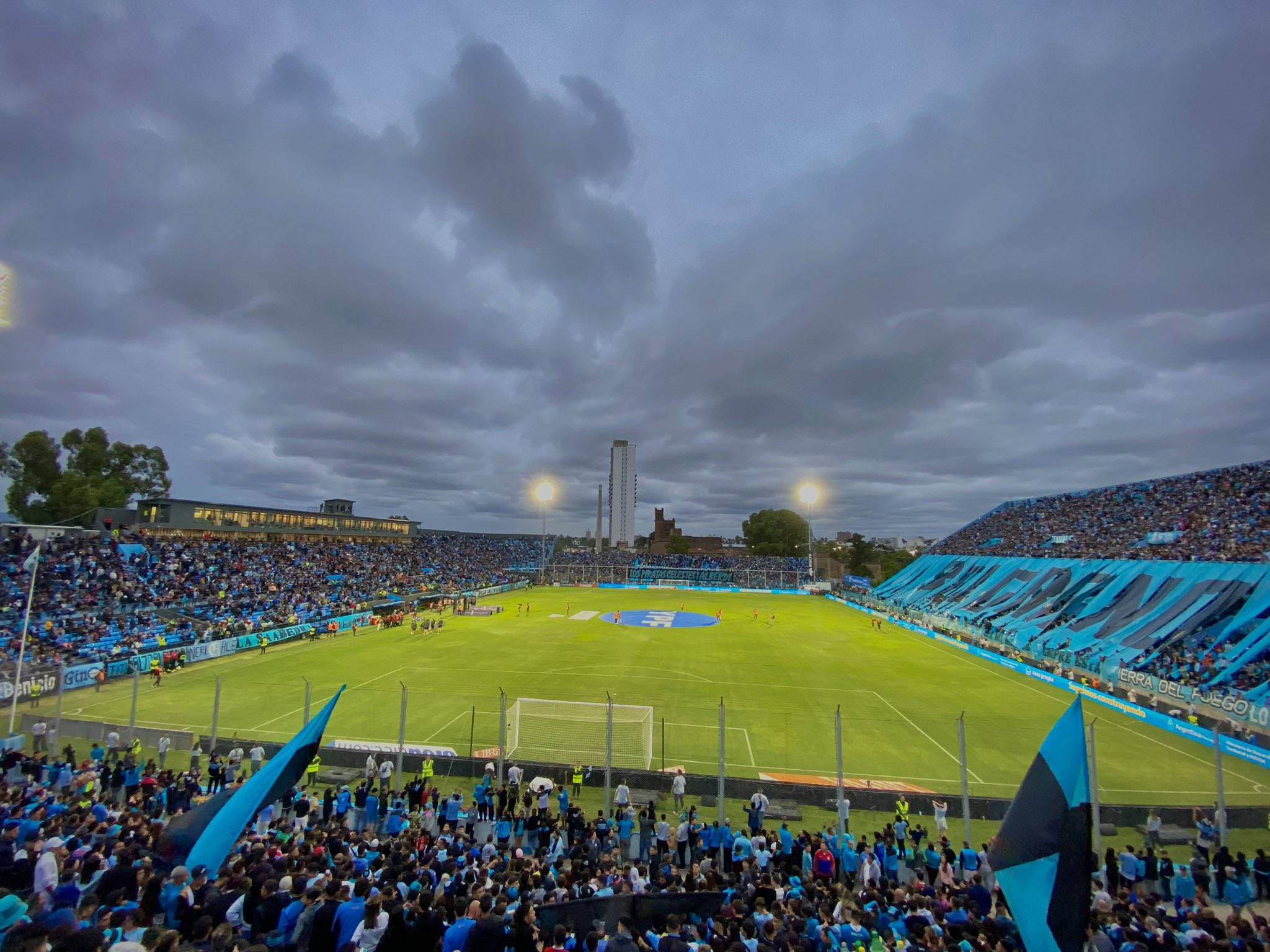
- Estadio Julio César Villagra, venue
Estudiantes (LP)	Independiente Rivadavia
3	2
- After extra time
- Date: 12 November 2026
- Venue: Estadio Julio César Villagra, Córdoba
- Man of the Match: Guido Carrillo
- Referee: Yael Falcón Pérez

The 2025 Supercopa Argentina was the 12th edition of the Supercopa Argentina, an annual football match contested by the winners of the Trofeo de Campeones de la Liga Profesional and Copa Argentina competitions.

It was contested between Estudiantes (LP) (winners of 2025 Trofeo de Campeones) and Independiente Rivadavia (winners of 2025 Copa Argentina) on 12 November 2026 at Estadio Julio César Villagra in Córdoba.

Previously, the champions of the Argentine Primera División tournament competed in the Supercopa Argentina, but with the return to a league system that includes two tournaments (Torneo Apertura and Torneo Clausura)—and, therefore, two champions—the Supercopa Argentina is now contested between the winners of the Trofeo de Campeones de la Liga Profesional, which pits the champions of both Primera División tournaments against each other, and the winners of the Copa Argentina.

The match was originally scheduled for 21 July 2026, but was postponed due to the Argentina national football team participation in the 2026 FIFA World Cup final and its subsequent return to Argentina.

Estudiantes (LP) defeated Independiente Rivadavia 3–2, after extra time, to win their first Supercopa Argentina title.

== Qualified teams ==
- Note: **Bold** indicates winners

Team	Qualification	Previous appearances
Estudiantes (LP)	2025 Trofeo de Campeones champions	1 (2023)
Independiente Rivadavia	2025 Copa Argentina champions	None

== Match ==
=== Details ===
2025 Supercopa Argentina
12 November 2026
20:00 UTC−3

Estudiantes (LP)	3–2 (a.e.t.)	Independiente Rivadavia
Carrillo 54'; Villalba 67' (o.g.); Alario 95'	Report	Florentín 88'; Villalba 90+5'

Estadio Julio César Villagra, Córdoba
Referee: Yael Falcón Pérez

**Estudiantes (LP)**	**Independiente Rivadavia**

GK	16	(Uruguay) Fernando Muslera
DF	4	(Argentina) Santiago Núñez
DF	14	(Argentina) Leandro González Pírez	(yellow card) 43'
DF	5	(Argentina) Marcos Rojo		(substituted off) 74'
MF	20	(Argentina) Eric Meza
MF	21	(Argentina) Ezequiel Piovi	(yellow card) 57'
MF	31	(Argentina) Baltasar Rodríguez		(substituted off) 109'
MF	17	(Argentina) Joaquín Tobio Burgos		(substituted off) 74'
FW	29	(Argentina) Fabricio Pérez		(substituted off) 65'
FW	9	(Argentina) Guido Carrillo (c)		(substituted off) 84'
FW	10	(Uruguay) Tiago Palacios		(substituted off) 74'
Substitutes:
GK	1	(Argentina) Fabricio Iacovich
DF	13	(Argentina) Gastón Benedetti
DF	24	(Argentina) Tomás Palacios		(substituted on) 74'
DF	40	(Argentina) Eros Mancuso		(substituted on) 109'
MF	7	(Argentina) José Sosa
MF	22	(Argentina) Alexis Castro		(substituted on) 65'
MF	34	(Colombia) Miguel Monsalve	(yellow card) 101'	(substituted on) 74'
MF	39	(Syria) Jalil Elías
MF	52	(Argentina) Bautista Kociubinski
FW	18	(Colombia) Edwuin Cetré		(substituted on) 74'
FW	19	(Argentina) Adolfo Gaich
FW	27	(Argentina) Lucas Alario	(yellow card) 98'	(substituted on) 84'
Manager:
(Uruguay) Alexander Medina			(red card) 115'

GK	21	(Argentina) Emmanuel Gómez Riga
DF	36	(Argentina) Ezequiel Bonifacio		(substituted off) 74'
DF	40	(Paraguay) Iván Villalba		(substituted off) 91'
DF	13	(Argentina) Alejo Osella	(red card) 90+1'	(substituted off) 74'
DF	3	(Argentina) Juan Elordi
MF	2	(Uruguay) Leonard Costa		(substituted off) 64'
MF	25	(Paraguay) José Florentín
MF	10	(Argentina) Matías Fernández	(yellow card) 115'
MF	77	(Argentina) Luis Sequeira		(substituted off) 74'
MF	8	(Argentina) Leonel Bucca		(substituted off) 55'
FW	9	(Paraguay) Álex Arce (c)	(yellow card) 62'
Substitutes:
GK	30	(Argentina) Nicolás Bolcato
DF	28	(Argentina) Alex Vigo
DF	42	(Argentina) Sheyko Studer		(substituted on) 74'
MF	5	(Argentina) Tomás Bottari		(substituted on) 91'
MF	11	(Argentina) Gonzalo Ríos		(substituted on) 55'
MF	27	(Argentina) Diego Crego
MF	34	(Argentina) Stefano Moreyra
FW	7	(Argentina) Victorio Ramis
FW	19	(Argentina) Rodrigo Atencio
FW	23	(Colombia) Luis Díaz		(substituted on) 74'
FW	43	(Argentina) Fabrizio Sartori		(substituted on) 64'
FW	80	(Argentina) Matías Reali	(yellow card) 93'	(substituted on) 74'
Manager:
(Argentina) Alfredo Berti

Assistant referees:
Facundo Rodríguez
Lucio Méndez
Fourth official:
Fabrizio Llobet
Fifth official:
José Castelli
Video assistant referee:
Héctor Paletta
Assistant video assistant referees:
Lucas Germánotta

**Match rules**

- 90 minutes.
- 30 minutes of extra time if necessary.
- Penalty shoot-out if scores still level.
- Twelve named substitutes.
- Maximum of five substitutions, with a sixth allowed in extra time.

=== Statistics ===
Overall
	Estudiantes (LP)	Independiente Rivadavia
Goals scored	3	2
Total shots	17	12
Shots on target	11	7
Ball possession	49%	51%
Corner kicks	7	3
Fouls committed	14	27
Offsides	0	2
Yellow cards	4	3
Red cards	1	1

2025 Supercopa Argentina winners
**Estudiantes (LP)**
**1st Title**
