= 2026 Independiente Rivadavia season =

Independiente Rivadavia
2026 season
- Manager: Alfredo Berti
- Stadium: Estadio Bautista Gargantini
- Primera División Torneo Apertura: 1st Round of 16
- Primera División Torneo Clausura: 7th
- Copa Argentina: Round of 16
- Copa Libertadores: Round of 16
- Top goalscorer: League: Alex Arce (5); All: Alex Arce (14)

The 2026 season is the 113th season in the history of Club Sportivo Independiente Rivadavia and their fourth season in the Argentine Primera División. The team also competes in the Copa Argentina alongside their debut participation in the Copa Libertadores, where they dominated their group with 16 points and 15 goals.

== Transfers ==
=== In ===
Pos.	Player	Transferred to	Fee	Date	Source
DF	(Argentina) Sheyko Studer	(Argentina) Talleres	Undisclosed	1 January 2026	
MF	(Paraguay) José Florentín	(Argentina) Central Córdoba	Free	7 January 2026	
GK	(Argentina) Ramiro Macagno	(Greece) Levadiakos	Loan	7 January 2026	
MF	(Argentina) Matías Alejandro Fernández	(Argentina) Excursionistas	Undisclosed (Note: Loan made permanent)	14 January 2026	
DF	(Argentina) Juan Manuel Elordi	(Argentina) Racing Club	Loan	14 January 2026	
MF	(Argentina) Stefano Moreyra	(Argentina) Instituto	Free	14 January 2026	
DF	(Argentina) Alejo Osella	(Argentina) Deportivo Armenio	Undisclosed	14 January 2026	
DF	(Argentina) Nahuel Arena	(Ecuador) Macará	Loan	17 January 2026	
FW	(Argentina) Rodrigo Atencio	(Brazil) Sport Recife	Loan	20 January 2026	
FW	(Argentina) Bautista Dadín	(Argentina) River Plate	Loan	20 January 2026	
MF	(Argentina) Kevin Alejandro Vázquez	(Argentina) Vélez Sarsfield	Loan	20 January 2026	
MF	(Argentina) Alessandro Riep	(Chile) Audax Italiano	Loan	25 January 2026	
MF	(Colombia) Luis Díaz	(Colombia) Envigado	Undisclosed	2 August 2026	
FW	(Argentina) Maximiliano Salas	(Argentina) River Plate	Loan	7 August 2026	

=== Out ===
Pos.	Player	Transferred to	Fee	Date	Source
MF	(Argentina) Mauricio Cardillo	(Argentina) San Lorenzo	Free	26 January 2026	
DF	(Argentina) Nahuel Arena	(Ecuador) Macará	Loan return	30 June 2026	
FW	(Argentina) Bautista Dadín	(Argentina) River Plate	Loan return	30 June 2026	
FW	(Colombia) Sebastián Villa	(Argentina) Boca Juniors	$6.5 million	17 July 2026	

== Competitions ==
=== Overall record ===
Competition	First match	Last match	Starting round	Final position	Record							
Competition	First match	Last match	Starting round	Final position	Pld	W	D	L	GF	GA	GD	Win %
Primera División Torneo_Apertura	24 January 2026	10 May 2026	Matchday 1	1st Round of 16	17	10	4	3	30	17	+13	58.82
Primera División Torneo_Clausura	26 July 2026		Matchday 1		4	2	1	1	5	4	+1	50.00
Copa Argentina	18 January 2026		Round of 64		2	2	0	0	3	0	+3	100.00
Copa Libertadores	8 April 2026		Group stage		7	5	2	0	15	6	+9	71.43
Total					30	19	7	4	53	27	+26	63.33

Last updated: 11 August 2026
Source: Competitions

=== Primera División ===
==== Torneo Apertura ====
Round	1	2	3	4	5	6	7	8	9	10	11	12	13	14	15	16
Ground	H	A	H	A	H	H	A	H	A	H	A	H	A	H	A	H
Result	W	W	W	W	L	W	D	D	D	L	W	W	W	W	D	W
Position																

A = Away; H = Home; W = Win; D = Draw; L = Loss

24 January 2026 1	Independiente Rivadavia	2–1	Atlético Tucumán

28 January 2026 2	Huracán	1–2	Independiente Rivadavia

4 February 2026 3	Independiente Rivadavia	2–1	Sarmiento

10 February 2026 4	Estudiantes de Río Cuarto	0–1	Independiente Rivadavia

15 February 2026 5	Independiente Rivadavia	0–1	Belgrano

21 February 2026 6	Independiente Rivadavia	3–2	Independiente

26 February 2026 7	Racing Club	1–1	Independiente Rivadavia

3 March 2026 8	Independiente Rivadavia	1–1	River Plate

12 March 2026 10	Independiente Rivadavia	1–2	Barracas

15 March 2026 11	Gimnasia y Esgrima	2–3	Independiente Rivadavia

23 March 2026 12	Independiente Rivadavia	2–0	Rosario Central

2 April 2026 13	Tigre	0–2	Independiente Rivadavia

11 April 2026 14	Independiente Rivadavia	3–1	Argentinos Juniors

20 April 2026 15	Banfield	0–0	Independiente Rivadavia

26 April 2026 16	Independiente Rivadavia	5–1	Gimnasia de Mendoza

3 May 2026 9	Aldosivi	1–1	Independiente Rivadavia

===== Play-offs =====
10 May 2026 Round of 16	Independiente Rivadavia	1–2	Unión

==== Torneo Clausura ====
Round	1	2	3	4
Ground	A	H	A	H
Result	D	W	L	W
Position				

Updated to match(es) played on 7 August 2026. Source:
A = Away; H = Home; W = Win; D = Draw; L = Loss

26 July 2026 1	Atlético Tucumán	0–0	Independiente Rivadavia

31 July 2026 2	Independiente Rivadavia	2–1	Huracán

3 August 2026 3	Sarmiento	2–1	Independiente Rivadavia

8 August 2026 4	Independiente Rivadavia	2–1	Estudiantes de Río Cuarto

=== Copa Argentina ===
18 January 2026 Round of 64	Independiente Rivadavia	2–0	Estudiantes de Buenos Aires

12 July 2026 Round of 32	Independiente Rivadavia	1–0	Tigre

=== Copa Libertadores ===
==== Group stage ====
Group C

Pos	Team	Pld	W	D	L	GF	GA	GD	Pts	Qualification
1	(Argentina) Independiente Rivadavia	6	5	1	0	15	6	+9	16	Advance to round of 16
2	(Brazil) Fluminense	6	2	2	2	7	7	0	8	Advance to round of 16
3	(Bolivia) Bolívar	6	1	2	3	6	8	−2	5	Transfer to Copa Sudamericana
4	(Venezuela) Deportivo La Guaira	6	0	3	3	6	13	−7	3	

Source: CONMEBOL
Rules for classification: 1) Points; 2) Head-to-head points; 3) Head-to-head goal difference; 4) Head-to-head goals scored; 5) Goal difference; 6) Goals scored; 7) Red cards; 8) Yellow cards; 9) Drawing of lots.

Round	1	2	3	4	5	6
Ground	H	A	H	H	A	A
Result	W	W	W	D	W	W
Position						

A = Away; H = Home; W = Win; D = Draw; L = Loss

8 April 2026 1	Independiente Rivadavia (Argentina)	1–0	(Bolivia) Bolívar

16 April 2026 2	Fluminense (Brazil)	1–2	(Argentina) Independiente Rivadavia

1 May 2026 3	Independiente Rivadavia (Argentina)	4–1	(Venezuela) Deportivo La Guaira

7 May 2026 4	Independiente Rivadavia (Argentina)	1–1	(Brazil) Fluminense

22 May 2026 5	Deportivo La Guaira (Venezuela)	2–4	(Argentina) Independiente Rivadavia

28 May 2026 6	Bolívar (Bolivia)	1–3	(Argentina) Independiente Rivadavia

==== Final stages ====
===== Round of 16 =====
11 August 2026 First leg	Fluminense (Brazil)	0–0	(Argentina) Independiente Rivadavia	Rio de Janeiro
19:00 UTC−3				Stadium: Maracanã; Referee: Cristián Garay (Chile)
