= Riep =

Riep is a surname. Notable people with the surname include:

- Alessandro Riep (born 2003), Chilean footballer
- Rodrigo Riep (born 1976), Argentine footballer

== See also ==
- Rieps, a municipality in Germany
- Regional Improvement and Efficiency Partnership
