= 2025 Copa Argentina =

Tournament details
- Country: Argentina
- Dates: 22 January – 5 November 2025
- Teams: 64

Final positions
- Champions: Independiente Rivadavia (1st title)
- Runners-up: Argentinos Juniors
- 2026 Copa Libertadores: Independiente Rivadavia

Tournament statistics
- Matches played: 63
- Goals scored: 146 (2.32 per match)
- Top goal scorer: Tomás Molina (5 goals)

Awards
- Best player: Lucas Zelarayán

The 2025 Copa Argentina (officially the Copa Argentina AXION energy 2025 for sponsorship reasons) was the fifteenth edition of the Copa Argentina, and the thirteenth since the relaunch of the tournament in 2011. The competition began on 22 January and ended on 5 November 2025. Central Córdoba (SdE) were the defending champions, but they were eliminated in the round of 64.

Independiente Rivadavia defeated Argentinos Juniors in the final on penalties to win their first tournament title. As winners, Independiente Rivadavia qualified for the group stage of the 2026 Copa Libertadores and earned the right to play the winners of the 2025 Trofeo de Campeones in the 2025 Supercopa Argentina.

== Teams ==
The 64 teams that took part in this competition included: all twenty-eight teams from the Primera División; fifteen teams of the Primera Nacional; six from the Primera B, five from the Primera C, and ten teams from Federal A.

=== First Level ===
==== Primera División ====
All twenty-eight teams of the 2024 tournament qualified.

- Argentinos Juniors
- Atlético Tucumán
- Banfield
- Barracas Central
- Belgrano
- Boca Juniors
- Central Córdoba (SdE)^{TH}
- Defensa y Justicia
- Deportivo Riestra
- Estudiantes (LP)
- Gimnasia y Esgrima (LP)
- Godoy Cruz
- Huracán
- Independiente
- Independiente Rivadavia
- Instituto
- Lanús
- Newell's Old Boys
- Platense
- Racing
- River Plate
- Rosario Central
- San Lorenzo
- Sarmiento (J)
- Talleres (C)
- Tigre
- Unión
- Vélez Sarsfield

=== Second Level ===
==== Primera Nacional ====
The top 7 teams in each group plus the best eighth-placed one of the 2024 tournament qualified.

- Aldosivi
- All Boys
- Colón
- Defensores de Belgrano
- Deportivo Madryn
- Estudiantes (BA)
- Gimnasia y Esgrima (J)
- Gimnasia y Esgrima (M)
- Gimnasia y Tiro
- Nueva Chicago
- Quilmes
- Racing (C)
- San Martín (SJ)
- San Martín (T)
- San Telmo

=== Third Level ===
==== Primera B Metropolitana ====
The champion and the top five teams of the 2024 tournament qualified.

- Argentino (Q)
- Colegiales
- Deportivo Armenio
- Excursionistas
- Los Andes
- Midland

==== Torneo Federal A ====
The top five teams of each zone from the Second Stage of the 2024 tournament qualified.

- Argentino (MM)
- Central Norte
- Ciudad de Bolivar
- Kimberley
- San Martín (F)
- Santamarina
- Sarmiento (LB)
- Sportivo Belgrano
- Sportivo Las Parejas
- Villa Mitre

=== Fourth Level ===
==== Primera C Metropolitana ====
The champion and the top four teams of the 2024 tournament qualified.

- Berazategui
- Central Córdoba (R)
- Deportivo Español
- General Lamadrid
- Real Pilar

== Round and draw dates ==
Phase	Round	Draw date	Dates
Final stage	Round of 64	20 December 2024	22 January–17 April 2025
Final stage	Round of 32	20 December 2024	11 May–2 August 2025
Final stage	Round of 16	20 December 2024	30 July–28 August 2025
Final stage	Quarterfinals	20 December 2024	5 September–2 October 2025
Final stage	Semifinals	20 December 2024	23–24 October 2025
Final stage	Final	20 December 2024	5 November 2025

== Final rounds ==
=== Draw ===
The draw for the finals rounds was held on 20 December 2024, 16:30 at the AFA Futsal Stadium in Ezeiza. The 64 qualified teams were divided into six groups. The Big Five and Huracán were paired and placed directly in Group 1. The other historical rivals that play in the Argentine First Division were paired and placed in Groups 2 and 3. The Torneo Federal and Primera Nacional teams were placed directly in Groups 4 and 6, respectively, while Primera B Metropolitana and Primera C Metropolitana were placed in Group 5. From Group 1 to Group 3, the first team drawn was placed in a predetermined bracket and its historical rival was placed in the other. The matches were drawn from the respective confronts: Group 1 vs. Group 4; Group 2 vs. Group 5 and Group 3 vs. Group 6. With this draw format, historical rivals could only play against each other in the final.

Group 1		Group 4	Group 6
Boca Juniors; Independiente; Huracán	River Plate; Racing; San Lorenzo	Argentino (MM); Central Norte; Ciudad de Bolivar; Kimberley; San Martín (F); Santamarina; Sarmiento (LB); Sportivo Belgrano; Sportivo Las Parejas; Villa Mitre	All Boys; Colón; Defensores de Belgrano; Deportivo Madryn; Estudiantes (BA); Gimnasia y Esgrima (J); Gimnasia y Tiro; Nueva Chicago; Quilmes; Racing (C); San Telmo
Group 2		Argentino (MM); Central Norte; Ciudad de Bolivar; Kimberley; San Martín (F); Santamarina; Sarmiento (LB); Sportivo Belgrano; Sportivo Las Parejas; Villa Mitre	All Boys; Colón; Defensores de Belgrano; Deportivo Madryn; Estudiantes (BA); Gimnasia y Esgrima (J); Gimnasia y Tiro; Nueva Chicago; Quilmes; Racing (C); San Telmo
Estudiantes (LP); Newell's Old Boys; Argentinos Juniors; Vélez Sarsfield; Banfield; Belgrano	Gimnasia y Esgrima (LP); Rosario Central; Platense; Tigre; Lanús; Talleres (C)	Argentino (MM); Central Norte; Ciudad de Bolivar; Kimberley; San Martín (F); Santamarina; Sarmiento (LB); Sportivo Belgrano; Sportivo Las Parejas; Villa Mitre	All Boys; Colón; Defensores de Belgrano; Deportivo Madryn; Estudiantes (BA); Gimnasia y Esgrima (J); Gimnasia y Tiro; Nueva Chicago; Quilmes; Racing (C); San Telmo
Group 3		Group 5	
Godoy Cruz; Barracas Central; Atlético Tucumán; Aldosivi; Instituto; Unión; San Martín (SJ)	Independiente Rivadavia; Deportivo Riestra; San Martín (T); Sarmiento (J); Central Córdoba (SdE); Defensa y Justicia; Gimnasia y Esgrima (M)	Argentino (Q); Colegiales; Deportivo Armenio; Excursionistas; Los Andes; Midland; Berazategui; Central Córdoba (R); Deportivo Español; General Lamadrid; Real Pilar	

=== Bracket ===
==== Upper bracket ====
Round of 64
San Lorenzo (p)	0 (6)
Sportivo Las Parejas	0 (5)
Central Córdoba (SdE)	0
Quilmes	1
Tigre	3
Berazategui	0
Banfield	1
Villa Mitre	0
Platense	2
Argentino (Q)	0
Independiente Rivadavia	1
Estudiantes (BA)	0
Sarmiento (J)	0
Central Córdoba (R)	1
Gimnasia y Esgrima (LP)	1
Deportivo Español	0
Racing	2
Santamarina	0
San Martín (SJ) (p)	0 (3)
Gimnasia y Esgrima (J)	0 (0)
Deportivo Riestra (p)	2 (3)
San Telmo	2 (1)
Talleres (C)	3 (4)
Deportivo Armenio (p)	3 (5)
Rosario Central	1
Los Andes	0
Unión	3
Colegiales	1
San Martín (T) (p)	0 (3)
Colón	0 (1)
River Plate	2
Ciudad de Bolivar	0

Round of 32
San Lorenzo (p)	0 (4)
Quilmes	0 (3)
Tigre	2
Banfield	0
Platense	2 (1)
Independiente Rivadavia (p)	2 (3)
Central Córdoba (R) (p)	1 (5)
Gimnasia y Esgrima (LP)	1 (4)
Racing	3
San Martín (SJ)	1
Deportivo Riestra (p)	2 (4)
Deportivo Armenio	2 (3)
Rosario Central	0 (1)
Unión (p)	0 (3)
San Martín (T)	0
River Plate	3

Round of 16
San Lorenzo	0
Tigre	1
Independiente Rivadavia	2
Central Córdoba (R)	1
Racing	3
Deportivo Riestra	0
Unión	0 (3)
River Plate (p)	0 (4)

Quarterfinals
Tigre	1
Independiente Rivadavia	3
Racing	0
River Plate	1

Semifinals
Independiente Rivadavia (p)	0 (4)
River Plate	0 (3)

==== Lower bracket ====
Round of 64
Boca Juniors	5
Argentino (MM)	0
Atlético Tucumán	2
All Boys	1
Defensa y Justicia	3
Racing (C)	1
Newell's Old Boys (p)	0 (5)
Kimberley	0 (4)
Belgrano	3
Real Pilar	1
Barracas Central	0
Defensores de Belgrano	2
Gimnasia y Esgrima (M)	2
Nueva Chicago	0
Independiente	2
Sportivo Belgrano	0
Estudiantes (LP)	2
Sarmiento (LB)	1
Aldosivi (p)	1 (6)
Gimnasia y Tiro	1 (5)
Godoy Cruz	0
Excursionistas	1
Argentinos Juniors	3
Central Norte	0
Lanús	4
General Lamadrid	0
Vélez Sarsfield	1
Midland	0
Instituto	3
Deportivo Madryn	0
Huracán	2
San Martín (F)	1

Round of 32
Boca Juniors	1
Atlético Tucumán	2
Defensa y Justicia	0
Newell's Old Boys	2
Belgrano	3
Defensores de Belgrano	2
Gimnasia y Esgrima (M)	1
Independiente	2
Estudiantes (LP)	1 (2)
Aldosivi (p)	1 (4)
Excursionistas	0
Argentinos Juniors	3
Lanús	2
Vélez Sarsfield	0
Instituto	0 (2)
Huracán (p)	0 (3)

Round of 16
Atlético Tucumán	2
Newell's Old Boys	3
Belgrano	2
Independiente	0
Aldosivi	1
Argentinos Juniors	2
Lanús	2
Huracán	0

Quarterfinals
Newell's Old Boys	1
Belgrano	3
Argentinos Juniors	1
Lanús	0

Semifinals
Belgrano	1
Argentinos Juniors	2

=== Round of 64 ===
The Round of 64 had 10 qualified teams from the Torneo Federal A, 11 qualified teams from the Metropolitan Zone (6 teams from Primera B Metropolitana and 5 teams from Primera C Metropolitana), 15 teams from Primera Nacional and 28 teams from Primera División. The round was played in a single knock-out match format between 22 January and 17 April 2025. The 32 winning teams advanced to the Round of 32.

23 March 2025	San Lorenzo	0–0 (6–5 p)	Sportivo Las Parejas	San Nicolás de los Arroyos, Pcia. de Buenos Aires
19:15		Report		Stadium: Único de San Nicolás; Referee: Daniel Zamora
	Penalties
	Braida (penalty missed); Muniain (penalty scored); Reali (penalty scored); Cecchini (penalty missed); Vombergar (penalty scored); E. Herrera (penalty scored); Báez (penalty scored); Romaña (penalty scored)		(penalty scored) Britos; (penalty missed) Blanco; (penalty missed) Albertinazzi; (penalty scored) Fernández; (penalty scored) Aa. Martínez; (penalty scored) Arcando; (penalty scored) Yocco; (penalty missed) Herranz

12 March 2025	Huracán	2–1	San Martín (F)	Sarandí, Pcia. de Buenos Aires
21:10	Gil 33'; Ramírez 69'	Report	Vicedo 43'	Stadium: Julio Humberto Grondona; Referee: Pablo Echavarría

22 January 2025	Boca Juniors	5–0	Argentino (MM)	Santa Fe, Pcia. de Santa Fe
21:10	Zeballos 45+1'; Merentiel 45+4'; Janson 88'; Giménez 90'; Zenón 90+3'	Report		Stadium: Brigadier General Estanislao López; Referee: Luis Lobo Medina

19 March 2025	River Plate	2–0	Ciudad de Bolivar	Santiago del Estero, Pcia. de Santiago del Estero
21:15	González Pírez 3'; Mastantuono 35'	Report		Stadium: Único Madre de Ciudades; Referee: Sebastián Martínez

23 March 2025	Racing	2–0	Santamarina	Lanús, Pcia. de Buenos Aires
17:00	Mura 44'; Salas 55'	Report		Stadium: Ciudad de Lanús – Néstor Díaz Pérez; Referee: Sebastián Zunino

26 February 2025	Independiente	2–0	Sportivo Belgrano	San Nicolás de los Arroyos, Pcia. de Buenos Aires
21:30	Tarzia 30'; Mancuello 81' (pen.)	Report		Stadium: Único de San Nicolás; Referee: Andrés Gariano

25 February 2025	Estudiantes (LP)	2–1	Sarmiento (LB)	Santa Fe, Pcia. de Santa Fe
18:10	Tobio Burgos 18'; Pérez 89'	Report	Ochoa 73'	Stadium: 15 de Abril; Referee: Luis Lobo Medina

5 February 2025	Gimnasia y Esgrima (LP)	1–0	Deportivo Español	Quilmes, Pcia. de Buenos Aires
21:30	Castillo 51'	Report		Stadium: Centenario Ciudad de Quilmes; Referee: Franco Acita

12 March 2025	Platense	2–0	Argentino (Q)	Caseros, Pcia. de Buenos Aires
17:00	Lotti 46'; Taborda 80'	Report		Stadium: Ciudad de Caseros; Referee: Fernando Echenique

16 April 2025	Argentinos Juniors	3–0	Central Norte	Caseros, Pcia. de Buenos Aires
18:35	Rodríguez 38' (o.g.); Molina 48'; Herrera 67'	Report		Stadium: Ciudad de Caseros; Referee: Andrés Gariano

16 April 2025	Belgrano	3–1	Real Pilar	Rafaela, Pcia. de Santa Fe
21:10	Compagnucci 14'; Fernández 24', 34'	Report	Quignon 48' (o.g.)	Stadium: Nuevo Monumental; Referee: Nazareno Arasa

19 March 2025	Talleres (C)	3–3 (4–5 p)	Deportivo Armenio	Santa Fe, Pcia. de Santa Fe
18:00	Tarragona 16'; Botta 18'; Reynoso 75'	Report	Herrera 49', 52', 54'	Stadium: Brigadier General Estanislao López; Referee: Nicolás Lamolina
	Penalties
	Girotti (penalty scored); Ortegoza (penalty scored); Reynoso (penalty missed); Mosqueira (penalty scored); Bustos (penalty scored); J. Portillo (penalty missed)		(penalty scored) Pérez; (penalty scored) Troxler; (penalty missed) López; (penalty scored) Montero; (penalty scored) Ávalos; (penalty scored) Motta

9 April 2025	Rosario Central	1–0	Los Andes	San Nicolás de los Arroyos, Pcia. de Buenos Aires
16:00	Giaccone 70'	Report		Stadium: Único de San Nicolás; Referee: Pablo Dóvalo

3 April 2025	Newell's Old Boys	0–0 (5–4 p)	Kimberley	Florida, Pcia. de Buenos Aires
21:10		Report		Stadium: Ciudad de Vicente López; Referee: Pablo Echavarría
	Penalties
	Banega (penalty scored); González (penalty missed); Sotelo (penalty scored); Cuesta (penalty scored); García (penalty scored); Cardozo (penalty scored)		(penalty scored) Bacigalupe; (penalty scored) Loscalzo; (penalty scored) Mantia; (penalty missed) Pereyra; (penalty scored) Rinaldi; (penalty missed) S. Vázquez

5 February 2025	Lanús	4–0	General Lamadrid	Sarandí, Pcia. de Buenos Aires
19:15	Moreno 37', 58'; Aquino 45'; Orozco 51'	Report		Stadium: Julio Humberto Grondona; Referee: Bruno Amiconi

1 April 2025^{[a]}	Banfield	1–0	Villa Mitre	Florencio Varela, Pcia. de Buenos Aires
19:00	Alaniz 30'	Report		Stadium: Norberto "Tito" Tomaghello; Referee: Pablo Dóvalo

22 March 2025	Tigre	3–0	Berazategui	Morón, Pcia. de Buenos Aires
19:15	Oviedo 49', 62'; Russo 66'	Report		Stadium: Nuevo Francisco Urbano; Referee: Lucas Comesaña

26 February 2025	Vélez Sarsfield	1–0	Midland	Florida, Pcia. de Buenos Aires
19:15	Romero 77' (pen.)	Report		Stadium: Ciudad de Vicente López; Referee: Hernán Mastrángelo

19 February 2025	Defensa y Justicia	3–1	Racing (C)	San Nicolás de los Arroyos, Pcia. de Buenos Aires
21:10	Balanta 17'; F. González 38'; C. Pérez 52'	Report	Perales 74'	Stadium: Único de San Nicolás; Referee: Pablo Giménez

5 March 2025	Unión	3–1	Colegiales	San Nicolás de los Arroyos, Pcia. de Buenos Aires
19:15	Dómina 37'; Estigarribia 52'; Verde 90+3'	Report	Cardozo 13' (o.g.)	Stadium: Único de San Nicolás; Referee: Bryan Ferreyra

5 March 2025	Deportivo Riestra	2–2 (3–1 p)	San Telmo	Caseros, Pcia. de Buenos Aires
17:00	Guille 18'; Sánchez 45+2'	Report	Cocimano 57', 62'	Stadium: Ciudad de Caseros; Referee: Juan Pafundi
	Penalties
	Bracamonte (penalty scored); Murillo (penalty scored); Guille (penalty scored)		(penalty missed) Cocimano; (penalty missed) Yangali; (penalty scored) Pusula; (penalty missed) Morro

17 April 2025	Barracas Central	0–2	Defensores de Belgrano	Sarandí, Pcia. de Buenos Aires
17:00		Report	Bruera 46' (o.g.); González 84'	Stadium: Julio Humberto Grondona; Referee: Nicolás Lamolina

27 February 2025	Godoy Cruz	0–1	Excursionistas	Córdoba, Pcia. de Córdoba
19:10		Report	Vera 50'	Stadium: El Gigante de Alberdi; Referee: Felipe Viola

16 April 2025	Independiente Rivadavia	1–0	Estudiantes (BA)	La Punta, Pcia. de San Luis
16:10	Osella 16'	Report		Stadium: Provincial Juan Gilberto Funes; Referee: Fernando Echenique

9 April 2025	Sarmiento (J)	0–1	Central Córdoba (R)	Caseros, Pcia. de Buenos Aires
21:10		Report	Marín 31'	Stadium: Ciudad de Caseros; Referee: Bruno Amiconi

19 March 2025	Aldosivi	1–1 (6–5 p)	Gimnasia y Tiro	Sarandí, Pcia. de Buenos Aires
15:45	Chávez 45+2'	Report	Galetto 31'	Stadium: Julio Humberto Grondona; Referee: Bruno Amiconi
	Penalties
	Torres (penalty scored); Guerrico (penalty scored); Serrago (penalty scored); Guzmán (penalty scored); Giani (penalty scored); Cerato (penalty scored)		(penalty scored) Díaz; (penalty scored) Monti; (penalty scored) Villalva; (penalty scored) Busse; (penalty scored) Galetto; (penalty missed) Morello

12 February 2025	Gimnasia y Esgrima (M)	2–0	Nueva Chicago	San Nicolás de los Arroyos, Pcia. de Buenos Aires
19:15	Muñoz 21'; González 65'	Report		Stadium: Único de San Nicolás; Referee: Jorge Baliño

26 March 2025	San Martín (SJ)	0–0 (3–0 p)	Gimnasia y Esgrima (J)	Córdoba, Pcia. de Córdoba
17:00		Report		Stadium: El Gigante de Alberdi; Referee: Bryan Ferreyra
	Penalties
	Anselmo (penalty scored); Iacobellis (penalty scored); F. González (penalty scored)		(penalty missed) Dematei; (penalty missed) Duré; (penalty missed) Noble

12 February 2025	San Martín (T)	0–0 (3–1 p)	Colón	Rafaela, Pcia. de Santa Fe
17:00		Report		Stadium: Nuevo Monumental; Referee: Daniel Zamora
	Penalties
	Pino (penalty missed); Prokop (penalty scored); M. García (penalty missed); Zuliani (penalty scored); Peñalba (penalty scored)		(penalty missed) Gigliotti; (penalty scored) Barreto; (penalty missed) Talpone; (penalty missed) Negro

2 April 2025	Atlético Tucumán	2–1	All Boys	Rafaela, Pcia. de Santa Fe
16:00	Cabrera 61'; Díaz 90+3'	Report	Campostrini 90+5'	Stadium: Nuevo Monumental; Referee: Andrés Merlos

3 April 2025	Instituto	3–0	Deportivo Madryn	Caseros, Pcia. de Buenos Aires
18:45	Lázaro 8'; L. Klimowicz 45', 52'	Report		Stadium: Ciudad de Caseros; Referee: Ariel Penel

22 March 2025	Central Córdoba (SdE)	0–1	Quilmes	Córdoba, Pcia. de Córdoba
21:30		Report	Machado 77'	Stadium: El Gigante de Alberdi; Referee: Pablo Echavarría

Notes

[a]. The match was originally scheduled for 11 March 2025, 17:00. It was postponed due to flooding in Bahia Blanca caused by heavy rainfall.

=== Round of 32 ===
This round had 32 qualified teams from the Round of 64. It was played between 11 May and 2 August 2025 in a single knock-out match format. The 16 winning teams advanced to the Round of 16.

5 July 2025	San Lorenzo	0–0 (4–3 p)	Quilmes	Lanús, Pcia. de Buenos Aires
16:45		Report		Stadium: Ciudad de Lanús – Néstor Díaz Pérez; Referee: Luis Lobo Medina
	Penalties
	Vombergar (penalty scored); Cuello (penalty scored); E. Herrera (penalty scored); Báez (penalty scored)		(penalty scored) Allende; (penalty scored) Belinetz; (penalty missed) Aranda; (penalty scored) Ramírez; (penalty missed) Flores

26 June 2025	Tigre	2–0	Banfield	Morón, Pcia. de Buenos Aires
19:30	Scipioni 29'; Armoa 75'	Report		Stadium: Nuevo Francisco Urbano; Referee: Andrés Gariano

2 July 2025	Platense	2–2 (1–3 p)	Independiente Rivadavia	Rosario, Pcia. de Santa Fe
21:15	Picco 44'; Mainero 77' (pen.)	Report	Villa 11' (pen.); Retamar 55'	Stadium: Marcelo Bielsa; Referee: Pablo Dóvalo
	Penalties
	Vázquez (penalty missed); Mainero (penalty missed); Schor (penalty scored); Saborido (penalty missed)		(penalty missed) Studer; (penalty scored) Fernández; (penalty scored) Barbieri; (penalty scored) Cardillo

11 May 2025	Central Córdoba (R)	1–1 (5–4 p)	Gimnasia y Esgrima (LP)	San Nicolás de los Arroyos, Pcia. de Buenos Aires
15:30	Marín 90'	Report	Merlini 70'	Stadium: Único de San Nicolás; Referee: Luis Lobo Medina
	Penalties
	Killer (penalty scored); Sierra (penalty scored); T. Ramírez (penalty scored); Marín (penalty missed); Di Vanni (penalty scored); Vranjicán (penalty scored)		(penalty missed) Castillo; (penalty scored) Suso; (penalty scored) Mammini; (penalty scored) Di Biasi; (penalty scored) Mamut; (penalty missed) Piedrahita

2 July 2025	Racing	3–1	San Martín (SJ)	La Punta, Pcia. de San Luis
18:45	Martínez 28', 78'; Balboa 73'	Report	Tijanovich 19'	Stadium: Provincial Juan Gilberto Funes; Referee: Fernando Echenique

24 May 2025	Deportivo Riestra	2–2 (4–3 p)	Deportivo Armenio	Caseros, Pcia. de Buenos Aires
12:30	Sánchez 21'; P. Ramírez 76'	Report	Sica 6'; Maldonado 60'	Stadium: Ciudad de Caseros; Referee: Ariel Penel
	Penalties
	Benegas (penalty scored); Bracamonte (penalty scored); Fagúndez (penalty scored); P. Ramírez (penalty scored)		(penalty missed) Almanza; (penalty scored) Pérez; (penalty scored) Cardozo; (penalty scored) Medina; (penalty missed) Motta

28 June 2025	Rosario Central	0–0 (1–3 p)	Unión	San Nicolás de los Arroyos, Pcia. de Buenos Aires
13:00		Report		Stadium: Único de San Nicolás; Referee: Darío Herrera
	Penalties
	Malcorra (penalty scored); Módica (penalty missed); Duarte (penalty missed); Sández (penalty missed)		(penalty scored) Martínez; (penalty scored) Pittón; (penalty missed) Estigarribia; (penalty scored) Verde

2 August 2025	San Martín (T)	0–3	River Plate	Santiago del Estero, Pcia. de Santiago del Estero
21:10		Report	Montiel 33', 83'; Galoppo 71'	Stadium: Único Madre de Ciudades; Referee: Facundo Tello

23 July 2025	Boca Juniors	1–2	Atlético Tucumán	Santiago del Estero, Pcia. de Santiago del Estero
21:10	Cavani 90+7'	Report	Ferreira 65'; Bajamich 75'	Stadium: Único Madre de Ciudades; Referee: Hernán Mastrángelo

22 May 2025	Defensa y Justicia	0–2	Newell's Old Boys	San Nicolás de los Arroyos, Pcia. de Buenos Aires
21:10		Report	Herrera 38'; Maroni 47'	Stadium: Único de San Nicolás; Referee: Pablo Dóvalo

27 June 2025	Belgrano	3–2	Defensores de Belgrano	Villa Mercedes, Pcia. de San Luis
21:10	Passerini 37' (pen.); Compagnucci 68'; Ostchega 80'	Report	Aguirre 7', 58'	Stadium: Único de Villa Mercedes; Referee: Sebastián Martínez

29 June 2025	Gimnasia y Esgrima (M)	1–2	Independiente	La Punta, Pcia. de San Luis
17:00	Mondino 29'	Report	Montiel 52' (pen.); Angulo 88'	Stadium: Provincial Juan Gilberto Funes; Referee: Sebastián Zunino

1 June 2025	Estudiantes (LP)	1–1 (2–4 p)	Aldosivi	Florencio Varela, Pcia. de Buenos Aires
13:10	Castro 15'	Report	Giani 25'	Stadium: Norberto "Tito" Tomaghello; Referee: Bryan Ferreyra
	Penalties
	Castro (penalty missed); Benedetti (penalty scored); Arzamendia (penalty missed); Ascacíbar (penalty scored)		(penalty scored) Torres; (penalty scored) Preciado; (penalty scored) Breitenbruch; (penalty scored) Guerrico

28 May 2025	Excursionistas	0–3	Argentinos Juniors	Bajo Flores. Buenos Aires
17:00		Report	Molina 47'; Sosa 53'; Lozano 58'	Stadium: Pedro Bidegain; Referee: Juan Pafundi

21 May 2025	Lanús	2–0	Vélez Sarsfield	Morón, Pcia. de Buenos Aires
21:10	Carrera 21'; Salvio 36'	Report		Stadium: Nuevo Francisco Urbano; Referee: Andrés Gariano

3 July 2025	Instituto	0–0 (2–3 p)	Huracán	Rosario, Pcia. de Santa Fe
19:45		Report		Stadium: Marcelo Bielsa; Referee: Andrés Gariano
	Penalties
	Alarcón (penalty missed); Lodico (penalty missed); Rodríguez (penalty scored); Puebla (penalty scored); Luna (penalty missed)		(penalty missed) Gil; (penalty scored) Sequeira; (penalty scored) Guidara; (penalty scored) Pereyra

=== Round of 16 ===
This round had 16 qualified teams from the Round of 32. It was played between 30 July and 28 August 2025 in a single knock-out match format. The 8 winning teams advanced to the quarterfinals.

2 August 2025	San Lorenzo	0–1	Tigre	Morón, Pcia. de Buenos Aires
16:15		Report	Fértoli 25'	Stadium: Nuevo Francisco Urbano; Referee: Yael Falcón Pérez

30 July 2025	Independiente Rivadavia	2–1	Central Córdoba (R)	La Punta, Pcia. de San Luis
15:30	Villalba 44'; Cardillo 90+9'	Report	Marín 29'	Stadium: Provincial Juan Gilberto Funes; Referee: Pablo Echavarría

3 August 2025	Racing	3–0	Deportivo Riestra	Lanús, Pcia. de Buenos Aires
16:00	Vergara 10' (pen.); Barbieri 26' (o.g.); Mura 32'	Report		Stadium: Ciudad de Lanús – Néstor Díaz Pérez; Referee: Nazareno Arasa

28 August 2025	Unión	0–0 (3–4 p)	River Plate	Mendoza, Pcia. de Mendoza
21:15		Report		Stadium: Malvinas Argentinas; Referee: Andrés Gariano
	Penalties
	Martínez (penalty scored); Pittón (penalty scored); Gamba (penalty missed); Fascendini (penalty missed); Colazo (penalty scored)		(penalty scored) Quintero; (penalty scored) Borja; (penalty scored) Colidio; (penalty missed) Martínez Quarta; (penalty scored) Montiel

13 August 2025	Atlético Tucumán	2–3	Newell's Old Boys	Salta, Pcia. de Salta
19:30	Brizuela 31'; Coronel 36'	Report	Lollo 11'; Maroni 39'; González 60'	Stadium: Padre Ernesto Martearena; Referee: Ariel Penel

1 August 2025	Belgrano	2–0	Independiente	Rosario, Pcia. de Santa Fe
18:15	Jara 45+1'; L. Zelarayán 71'	Report		Stadium: Gigante de Arroyito; Referee: Fernando Echenique

31 July 2025	Aldosivi	1–2	Argentinos Juniors	Florencio Varela, Pcia. de Buenos Aires
21:10	Cerato 45'	Report	Lescano 77'; Molina 84' (pen.)	Stadium: Norberto "Tito" Tomaghello; Referee: Fernando Espinoza

1 August 2025	Lanús	2–0	Huracán	Quilmes, Pcia. de Buenos Aires
20:45	Marcich 51'; Aquino 69'	Report		Stadium: Centenario Ciudad de Quilmes; Referee: Sebastián Zunino

=== Quarterfinals ===
This round had 8 qualified teams from the Round of 16. The round was played between 5 September and 2 October 2025, in a single knock-out match format. The 4 winning teams advanced to the semifinals.

5 September 2025	Tigre	1–3	Independiente Rivadavia	Rosario, Pcia. de Santa Fe
21:10	Saralegui 20'	Report	Fernández 14'; Sartori 73'; Bonifacio 88'	Stadium: Marcelo Bielsa; Referee: Pablo Dóvalo

2 October 2025	Racing	0–1	River Plate	Rosario, Pcia. de Santa Fe
18:00		Report	Salas 5'	Stadium: Gigante de Arroyito; Referee: Hernán Mastrángelo

17 September 2025	Newell's Old Boys	1–3	Belgrano	Villa Mercedes, Pcia. de San Luis
18:00	González 8'	Report	Jara 23', 77'; L. López 50'	Stadium: Único de Villa Mercedes; Referee: Leandro Rey Hilfer

8 September 2025	Argentinos Juniors	1–0	Lanús	Avellaneda, Pcia. de Buenos Aires
21:10	Molina 35'	Report		Stadium: El Cilindro; Referee: Darío Herrera

=== Semifinals ===
This round had 4 qualified teams from the quarterfinals. The round was played on 23 and 24 October 2025, in a single knock-out match format. The 2 winning teams advanced to the final.

24 October 2025	Independiente Rivadavia	0–0 (4–3 p)	River Plate	Córdoba, Pcia. de Córdoba
22:10		Report		Stadium: Mario Alberto Kempes; Referee: Andrés Gariano
	Penalties
	Gómez (penalty scored); Costa (penalty missed); Sartori (penalty scored); Studer (penalty scored); Villa (penalty scored)		(penalty missed) Borja; (penalty missed) Galoppo; (penalty scored) Colidio; (penalty scored) Meza; (penalty scored) Montiel

23 October 2025	Belgrano	1–2	Argentinos Juniors	Rosario, Pcia. de Santa Fe
21:10	L. Zelarayán 35'	Report	López Muñoz 58'; Molina 80' (pen.)	Stadium: Gigante de Arroyito; Referee: Yael Falcón Pérez

=== Final ===
As winners, Independiente Rivadavia qualified for the group stage of the 2026 Copa Libertadores and earned the right to play the winners of the 2025 Trofeo de Campeones in the 2025 Supercopa Argentina.

5 November 2025
21:10

Independiente Rivadavia	2–2	Argentinos Juniors
Arce 8'; Fernández 62'	Report	Lescano 63'; Godoy 90+7'
Penalties
Gómez (penalty scored); Villalba (penalty scored); Retamar (penalty scored); Studer (penalty scored); Villa (penalty scored)	5–3	(penalty scored) Lescano; (penalty scored) López Muñoz; (penalty scored) Giaccone; (penalty missed) Molina

Estadio Monumental Presidente Perón, Córdoba
Referee: Nicolás Ramírez

== Top goalscorers ==
Rank	Player	Club	Goals
1	(Argentina) Tomás Molina	Argentinos Juniors	5
2	(Argentina) Jonathan Herrera	Deportivo Armenio	3
2	(Argentina) Franco Jara	Belgrano	3
2	(Argentina) Facundo Marín	Central Córdoba (R)	3
5	(Argentina) Ezequiel Aguirre	Defensores de Belgrano	2
5	(Argentina) Dylan Aquino	Lanús	2
5	(Argentina) Sebastián Cocimano	San Telmo	2
5	(Argentina) Gabriel Compagnucci	Belgrano	2
5	(Argentina) Matías Fernández	Independiente Rivadavia	2
5	(Argentina) Nicolás Fernández	Belgrano	2
5	(Paraguay) Carlos González	Newell's Old Boys	2
5	(Argentina) Luca Klimowicz	Instituto	2
5	(Argentina) Alan Lescano	Argentinos Juniors	2
5	(Argentina) Gonzalo Maroni	Newell's Old Boys	2
5	(Argentina) Adrián Martínez	Racing	2
5	(Argentina) Gonzalo Montiel	River Plate	2
5	(Argentina) Marcelino Moreno	Lanús	2
5	(Argentina) Facundo Mura	Racing	2
5	(Paraguay) Alfio Oviedo	Tigre	2
5	(Argentina) Maximiliano Salas	Racing/River Plate	2
5	(Argentina) Braian Sánchez	Deportivo Riestra	2
5	(Armenia) Lucas Zelarayán	Belgrano	2

Source: Copa Argentina

== Team of the tournament ==
Team
Goalkeeper	Defenders	Midfielders	Forwards
Franco Armani (River Plate)	Gabriel Compagnucci (Belgrano); Sheyko Studer (Independiente Rivadavia); Érik Godoy (Argentinos Juniors)	Lucas Zelarayán (Belgrano); Tomás Bottari (Independiente Rivadavia); Alan Lescano (Argentinos Juniors); Matías Fernández (Independiente Rivadavia)	Facundo Marín (Central Córdoba (R)); Tomás Molina (Argentinos Juniors); Sebastián Villa (Independiente Rivadavia)
Substitutes
Ezequiel Centurión (Independiente Rivadavia); Jorge Carranza (Aldosivi)	Facundo Mura (Racing); Iván Villalba (Independiente Rivadavia); Gonzalo Montiel (River Plate)	Federico Fattori (Argentinos Juniors); Marcelino Moreno (Lanús)	Maximiliano Salas (Racing/River Plate); Dylan Aquino (Lanús); Franco Jara (Belgrano); Jonathan Herrera (Deportivo Armenio); Carlos González (Newell's Old Boys)
Coach
Alfredo Berti (Independiente Rivadavia)

Source: Copa Argentina

== See also ==
- 2025 AFA Liga Profesional de Fútbol
