= Bautista Dadín =

Argentine footballer (born 2006)

Personal information
- Full name: Juan Bautista Dadín
- Date of birth: 20 May 2006 (age 20)
- Place of birth: Balcarce, Buenos Aires
- Height: 1.79 m (5 ft 10 1/2 in)
- Position: Forward

Team information
- Current team: Aldosivi (on loan from River Plate)
- Number: 16

Youth career
- Club Los Patos
- 2017–2026: River Plate

Senior career*
Years	Team	Apps	(Gls)
2025–	River Plate	4	(0)
2026	→ Independiente Rivadavia (loan)	6	(0)
2026–	→ Aldosivi (loan)	11	(0)
- * Club domestic league appearances and goals as of 17:45, 6 November 2026 (UTC)

Juan Bautista Dadín (born 20 May 2006) is an Argentine professional association football player who plays as a forward for Argentine Primera División club Aldosivi, on loan from River Plate.

== Club career ==
=== River Plate ===
Dadín arrived at River Plate in 2017 after passing a trial, following his impressive performances at Los Patos, a club from the Mar del Plata League. During his time in the youth divisions, he show his goal-scoring prowess, being top scorer of the Fifth Division. He made his reserve debut in the 2024 Torneo Proyección. In July 2025 he signed his first professional contract with River until December 2028 and with a release clause of 100 million euros.

Dadín made his official debut in the Primera División was the August 2025, coming on as a substitute in the match against Godoy Cruz in 2025 Torneo Clausura.

==== Loan to Independiente Rivadavia ====
After a standout year in the reserves, and 4 decent matches in the first team, he went on loan to Club Sportivo Independiente Rivadavia.

==== Loan to Aldosivi ====
After terminating his loan at Independiente Rivadavia, on July 4th he was loaned to Aldosivi for 18 months.
