= Fabrizio Sartori =

Argentine footballer

Personal information
- Full name: Fabrizio Sartori
- Date of birth: 15 July 2002 (age 24)
- Place of birth: Río Gallegos, Santa Cruz, Argentina
- Height: 1.78 m (5 ft 10 in)
- Position: Forward

Team information
- Current team: Independiente Rivadavia
- Number: 43

Youth career
- Newell's Old Boys

Senior career*
Years	Team	Apps	(Gls)
2023–2024	Newell's Old Boys	1	(0)
2024–	Independiente Rivadavia	62	(14)
- * Club domestic league appearances and goals as of 17:48, 6 October 2026 (UTC)

Fabrizio Sartori (born 15 July 2002) is an Argentine professional footballer who plays as a forward for Independiente Rivadavia.

== Club career ==
=== Newell's Old Boys ===
Sartori came through the youth setup at Newell's Old Boys, where he signed his first professional contract on 28 November 2022, running until the end of 2024. He made his debut on 12 April 2023, coming on as a substitute for Ramiro Sordo in a 1–0 win against Racing Club.

=== Independiente Rivadavia ===
In January 2024, he permanently joined Independiente Rivadavia. On 16 March, he scored his first professional goal in a 2–2 draw against Atlético Tucumán in the Copa de la Liga Profesional. After initially featuring between both the reserves and the first team, he began to establish himself in the first team in 2025. On 5 September 2025, he scored in a 3–1 win over Tigre in the quarter-final of the Copa Argentina. Rivadavia subsequently won the tournament, with Sartori an unused substitute in the final. He was in good scoring form during the 2026 Apertura, including scoring twice in a 3–2 win against Independiente on 21 February. As a result of the Copa Argentina win, his side qualified for the Copa Libertadores and he scored in a 2–1 away win against Campeonato Brasileiro Série A club Fluminenseon 16 April. After Rivadavia qualified for the knockout phase of the Apertura, he scored in a 2–1 defeat to Unión Santa Fe as his club was eliminated.

== Career statistics ==
As of 6 October 2026

Appearances and goals by club, season and competition
Club	Season	League			Cup (Note: Includes Copa Argentina)		Continental		Other		Total	
Club	Season	Division	Goals	Apps	Apps	Goals	Apps	Goals	Apps	Goals	Apps	Goals
Newell's Old Boys	2023	Liga Profesional	1	0	—		—		—		1	0
Independiente Rivadavia	2024	Liga Profesional	8	1	—		—		—		8	1
Independiente Rivadavia	2025	Liga Profesional	29	5	3	1	—		—		32	6
Independiente Rivadavia	2026	Liga Profesional	25	8	4	0	6 (Note: Appearances in Copa Libertadores)	1	—		35	9
Independiente Rivadavia	Total		62	14	7	1	6	1	0	0	75	16
Career total			63	14	7	1	6	1	0	0	76	16

== Honours ==
Independiente Rivadavia

- Copa Argentina: 2025
