= Facundo Marín =

Argentine footballer

Personal information
- Full name: Facundo Marín
- Date of birth: 20 October 2000 (age 26)
- Place of birth: Rosario, Argentina
- Height: 1.71 m (5 ft 7 in)
- Position: Winger

Team information
- Current team: Ferrocarril Midland

Youth career
- Juan XXIII
- AA Jorge Griffa
- Newell's Old Boys
- 2015–2018: Provincial Rosario
- 2019–2021: Patronato

Senior career*
Years	Team	Apps	(Gls)
2017–2018	Provincial Rosario	–	(–)
2018–2019	Newell's Old Boys (futsal)	–	(–)
2020–2021	Patronato	0	(0)
2022	Georgian football	–	(–)
2023	Paz	–	(–)
2023–2024	Studebaker	10	(0)
2024–2025	Central Córdoba	48	(15)
2026	Deportes Limache	7	(0)
2026–	Ferrocarril Midland	0	(0)
- * Club domestic league appearances and goals as of 27 June 2026

Facundo Marín (born 20 October 2000) is an Argentine professional footballer who plays as a winger for Ferrocarril Midland.

== Club career ==
Born in Rosario, Argentina, Marín was with Juan XXIII, AA Jorge Griffa, Newell's Old Boys and Provincial de Rosario until 2018 when he switched to futsal with Newell's Old Boys. With Provincial de Rosario, he played in the Liga Rosarina de Fútbol. In 2019, he joined Patronato and moved to Georgian football in 2022.

Back to Argentina, Marín played for Club Atlético Paz in the Liga Deportiva del Sur and Studebaker in the Liga Venadense de Fútbol.

In 2024, Marín joined Central Córdoba de Rosario and left them at the end of the 2025 season.

In December 2025, Marín moved to Chile and signed with Deportes Limache in the Liga de Primera. He left them in June 2026.

Back to Argentina, Marín joined Ferrocarril Midland.
