= Rodrigo Riep =

Argentine footballer

Personal information
- Full name: Rodrigo Sebastián Riep
- Date of birth: 20 February 1976 (age 50)
- Place of birth: Buenos Aires, Argentina
- Height: 1.70 m (5 ft 7 in)
- Position: Midfielder

Senior career*
Years	Team	Apps	(Gls)
1995	River Plate	3	(0)
1996–1997	Everton		
1997	Avispa Fukuoka	11	(0)
1998	Cobreloa	32	(8)
1999–2000	Olympiacos Volos		
2000–2002	Caracas	59	(3)
2002	Cobresal	12	(1)
2003	Deportes La Serena	14	(8)
2003	Coquimbo Unido	9	(1)
2003–2004	UA Maracaibo	27	(5)
2004	Barcelona SC	20	(1)
2005	Carabobo	16	(3)
2005–2007	Independiente Medellín	62	(5)
2007	Junior	17	(3)
- * Club domestic league appearances and goals

Rodrigo Sebastián Riep (born 20 February 1976) is an Argentine former professional footballer who played as a midfielder.

== Personal life ==
He is the father of the professional footballers Gianluca and Alessandro Riep.

== Post-retirement ==
He works as a football agent.

== Career statistics ==
Club performance			League		Cup		League Cup		Total	
Season	Club	League	Apps	Goals	Apps	Goals	Apps	Goals	Apps	Goals
Japan			League		Emperor's Cup		J.League Cup		Total	
1997	Avispa Fukuoka	J1 League	11	0	0	0	5	1	16	1
Total			11	0	0	0	5	1	16	1
