= Luis Díaz (footballer, born 2004) =

Colombian footballer

Personal information
- Full name: Luis Ángel Díaz Cuesta
- Date of birth: 24 April 2004 (age 22)
- Place of birth: Turbo, Colombia
- Height: 1.79 m (5 ft 10 in)
- Position: Forward

Team information
- Current team: Independiente Rivadavia
- Number: 23

Youth career
- 2013–2015: Urabá Estelar
- 2016: Inder Apartadó
- 2016: → Caribe (youth loan)
- 2017–2021: Envigado

Senior career*
Years	Team	Apps	(Gls)
2021–2026	Envigado	112	(13)
2026–	Independiente Rivadavia	0	(0)

International career^{‡}
2023	Colombia U20	1	(0)
- * Club domestic league appearances and goals as of 17:30, 8 August 2026 (UTC) ‡ National team caps and goals as of 16:53, 29 March 2023 (UTC)

Luis Ángel Díaz Cuesta (born 24 April 2004) is a Colombian footballer who currently plays as a forward for Argentine club Independiente Rivadavia.

== Early life ==
Born in Turbo, Díaz initially took an interest in track and field as a child, competing in 100m sprint, hurdling and long jump. His mother preferred him to participate in athletics rather than play football, so he would run away from home to go and play.

== Club career ==
=== Early career ===
At the age of nine, Díaz joined his first football club, the Urabá Estelar Fútbol Club. Following impressive performances, including scoring 57 goals in the 2015 season, he was called up to the Inder Apartadó team to play in the Torneo de Pony Fútbol. Despite his team being knocked out, he finished as top scorer, and was recruited on a youth loan by Caribe FC.

=== Envigado ===
Having received offers from a number of clubs, including his childhood team, Atlético Nacional, he joined the academy of Envigado on his father's advice, as he believed the opportunities would be better at Envigado. He progressed through the academy, and made his debut in the Copa Colombia on 29 July 2021, in a 1–1 away draw with Atlético Bucaramanga.

He scored his first goal for the club on 6 February 2023, the opener in a 1–1 Categoría Primera A draw with Unión Magdalena.

== International career ==
Díaz was called up to the Colombia under-20 side for friendlies against Wales and Sweden in March 2023. He went on to make his debut in the 0–0 draw with Sweden. During the same trip, he also scored two goals in a resounding 18–0 win over the under-21 side of Spanish team Real Murcia.

== Career statistics ==
=== Club ===
As of 29 March 2023.

Appearances and goals by club, season and competition
Club	Season	League			Cup		Other		Total	
Club	Season	Division	Apps	Goals	Apps	Goals	Apps	Goals	Apps	Goals
Envigado	2021	Categoría Primera A	0	0	1 (Note: Appearances in the Copa Colombia)	0	0	0	1	0
Envigado	2022	Categoría Primera A	5	0	0	0	0	0	5	0
Envigado	2023	Categoría Primera A	6	2	2	0	0	0	8	2
Career total			11	2	3	0	0	0	14	2
