= Sebastián Cocimano =

Argentine footballer

Personal information
- Date of birth: 19 May 2000 (age 26)
- Place of birth: La Plata, Argentina
- Height: 1.86 m (6 ft 1 in)
- Position: Forward

Team information
- Current team: Nueva Chicago

Youth career
- Gimnasia LP

Senior career*
Years	Team	Apps	(Gls)
2020–2024	Gimnasia LP	17	(0)
2022	→ Almagro (loan)	4	(0)
2022	→ Güemes (loan)	12	(1)
2024–2025	Chacarita Juniors	24	(3)
2025–2026	San Telmo	29	(9)
2026–	Nueva Chicago	7	(4)
- * Club domestic league appearances and goals as of 17:23, 13 April 2026 (UTC)

Sebastián Cocimano (born 19 May 2000) is an Argentine professional footballer who plays as a forward for Nueva Chicago.

== Club career ==
On 26 June 2016, Cocimano signed his first professional contract with Gimnasia y Esgrima. Cocimano made his professional debut Gimnasia y Esgrima with in a 1-0 Argentine Primera División loss to on 15 February 2020. In January 2022, Cocimano joined Primera Nacional club Club Almagro on loan for the rest of the year. However, the spell was cut short and on 1 June 2022, Cocimano signed a new loan deal, this time with Güemes until June 2023.
