= Brian Negro =

Argentine footballer (born 1997)

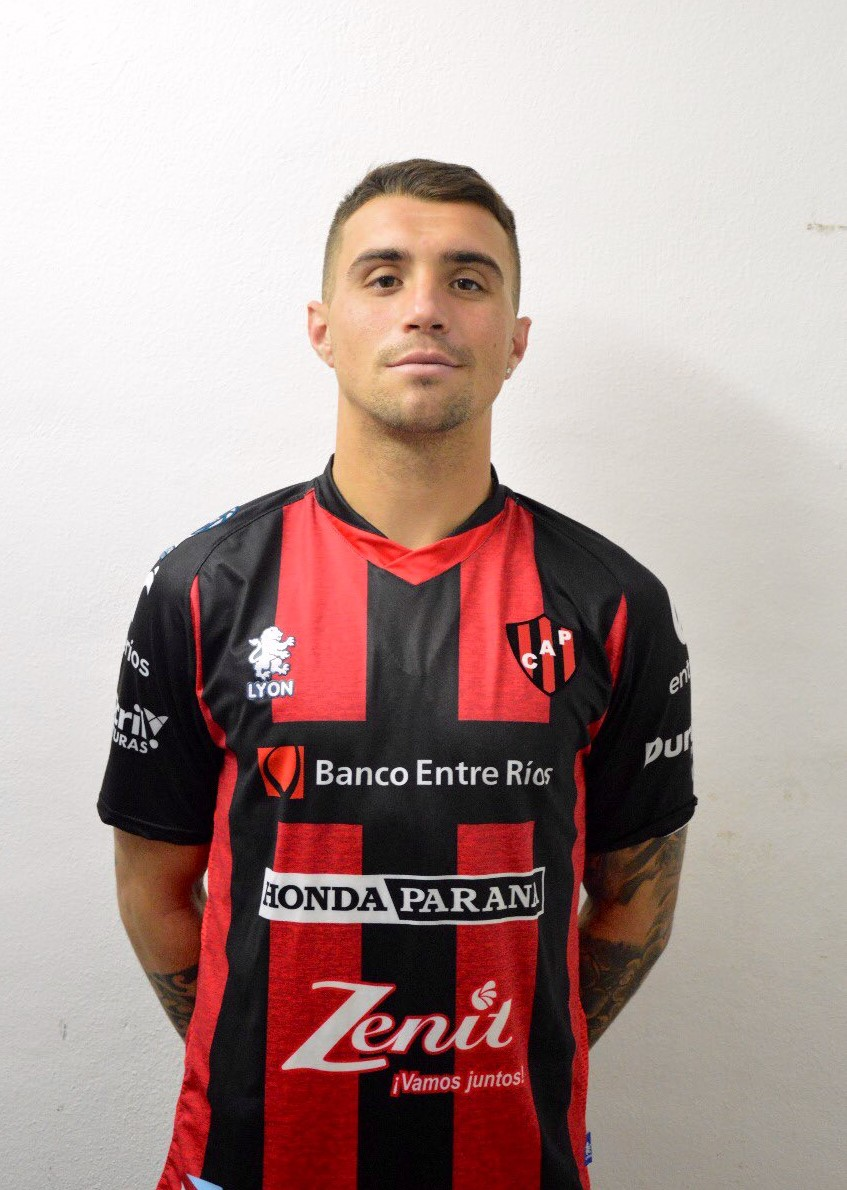
- Picture of Brian Negro

Personal information
- Full name: Brian Negro
- Date of birth: 8 September 1997 (age 29)
- Place of birth: Bovril, Argentina
- Height: 1.82 m (6 ft 0 in)
- Position: Left-back

Team information
- Current team: Colón
- Number: 6

Youth career
- Patronato

Senior career*
Years	Team	Apps	(Gls)
2018–2021	Patronato	6	(0)
2018–2019	→ Atlético Paraná (loan)	19	(1)
2021	→ Sarmiento Res. (loan)	21	(0)
2022–2023	Acassuso	34	(0)
2024	Tristán Suárez	32	(1)
2025–	Colón	14	(1)
- * Club domestic league appearances and goals as of 17:27, 14 June 2025 (UTC)

Brian Negro (born 8 September 1997) is an Argentine professional footballer who plays as a central defender for Colón.

== Club career ==
He began his career at Club Social y Deportivo Talleres, where he was playing until the age of 15. In January 2014, he was transferred to Club Atlético Patronato where he was playing for 3 years in the youth league and became a part of the first team squad in August 2017 until the present.

Negro made his professional debut with Patronato in a 1-0 Argentine Primera División loss to Vélez Sarsfield on 9 December 2019.

== Personal life ==
Brian Lionel Negro was born on 8 September 1997 in Bovril, province of Entre Rios, the first of the four children of Nestor Negro, a steel transport fleet manager, and his wife Edith Maricel Schaffer, who works in a clothing workshop. On his father's side, he is Argentinian descent, and on his mother's side, he has primarily German ancestry. Growing up in a tight-knit, football-environment, Brian developed a passion for the sport from an early age, playing at home with his older cousins and neighbours in a small village called Federal. At the age of eight he joined local club, Club Social y Deportivo Talleres where he played until the age of 15.

Moving from his home town to the bigger city of Parana, Entre Rios, Negro enrolled at Patronato's youth academy at age of 15.

After two years at Patronato's youth academy, he was promoted to the reserve team and a year after to the first team, where he signed his first professional contract on 1 August 2017.

== Career statistics ==
SEASON	CLUB	POSITION	TEAM	DIVISION	TABLE	TRAINER	PLAYED MATCHES	GOALS
2014-2017	CLUB ATLETICO PATRONATO	DEFENDER CENTRE BACK	YOUTH TEAM	YOUTH		MARCELO CANDIA		
2017-2018	CLUB ATLETICO PATRONATO	DEFENDER CENTRE BACK	RESERVE TEAM	SUPERLIGA RESERVE	12	DE LEON	46 (46)	4
2018-2019	CLUB ATLETICO PARANA (ON LOAN)	DEFENDER CENTRE BACK	FIRST TEAM	3rd DIVISION	1	TONY FONTANA	22 (24)	1
2019-2020	CLUB ATLETICO PATRONATO	DEFENDER CENTRE BACK	FIRST TEAM AND RESERVE TEAM	SUPERLIGA AND RESERVE	20	GUSTAVO ALVAREZ	1 20 (24)	1

== Gallery ==
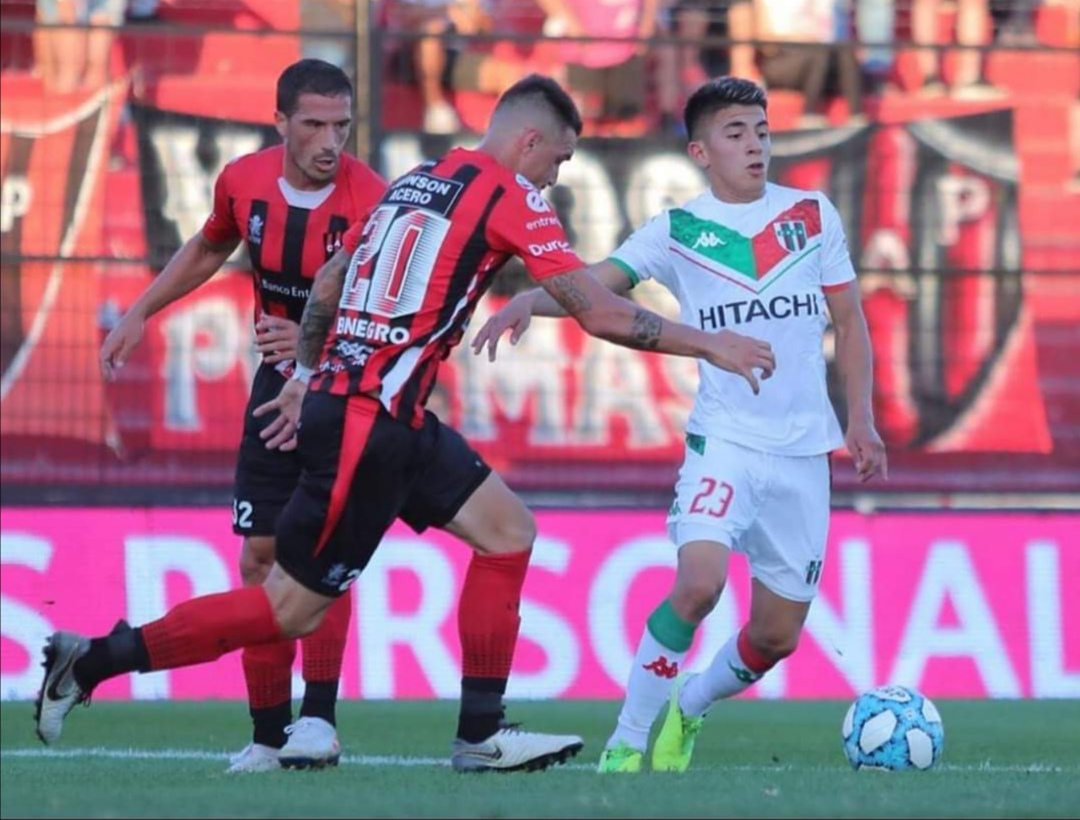
vs Velez debut

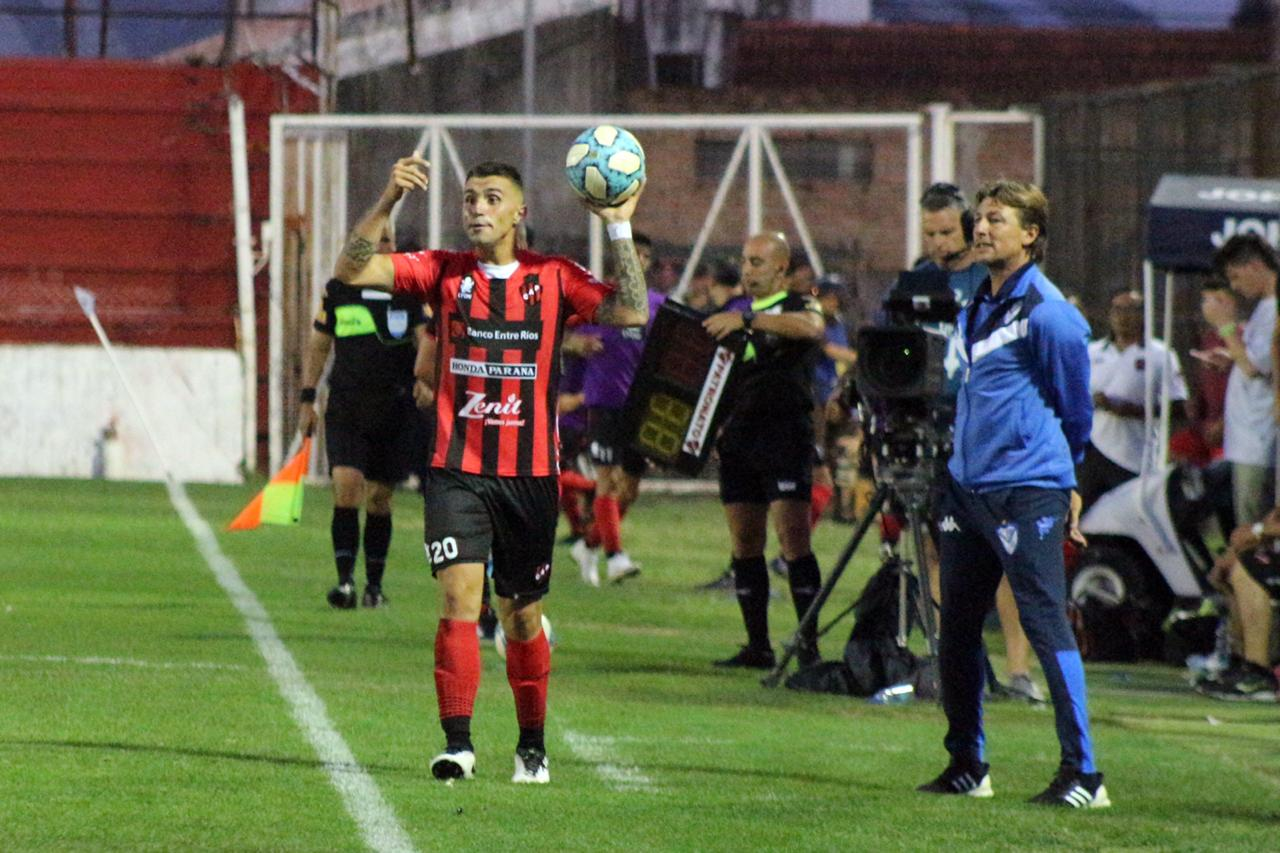
vs Velez
