= Sheyko Studer =

Argentine footballer

Personal information
- Full name: Sheyko Darko Studer
- Date of birth: 12 November 2002 (age 23)
- Place of birth: Santa Fe, Argentina
- Height: 1.91 m (6 ft 3 in)
- Position: Centre-back

Team information
- Current team: Independiente Rivadavia
- Number: 42

Youth career
- Talleres
- 2023: → Everton (loan)

Senior career*
Years	Team	Apps	(Gls)
2024–2026	Talleres	0	(0)
2024–2026	→ Independiente Rivadavia (loan)	44	(4)
2026–	Independiente Rivadavia	17	(2)
- * Club domestic league appearances and goals as of 17:47, 21 August 2026 (UTC)

Sheyko Darko Studer (born 12 November 2002) is an Argentine professional footballer who plays as a centre-back for Independiente Rivadavia.

== Club career ==
=== Early career ===
Studer came through the youth setup at Talleres, signing his first professional contract in 2021, before being loaned to Chilean club Everton in 2023.

=== Independiente Rivadavia ===
In August 2024, he was loaned to Independiente Rivadavia. He made his debut on 17 September 2024 in a 1–0 win against Defensa y Justicia, where he came on as a substitute after Esteban Burgos was injured and quickly established himself as a starter over the next few months. He scored his first professional goals in a 2–0 win against Tigre on 9 December 2024.

In 2025, he started the Copa Argentina final against Argentinos Juniors, which his side won 5–3 on penalties after a 2–2 draw. He took and scored Rivadavia's fourth penalty of the shootout. He was named in the team of the tournament, having started every game en route to victory.

After qualifying through their Copa Argentina win, he made his debut in the Copa Libertadores on 7 April 2026 in a 1–0 win against Bolívar.

== Career statistics ==
As of 21 August 2026

Appearances and goals by club, season and competition
Club	Season	League			Cup (Note: Includes Copa Argentina)		Continental		Other		Total	
Club	Season	Division	Goals	Apps	Apps	Goals	Apps	Goals	Apps	Goals	Apps	Goals
Independiente Rivadavia (loan)	2024	Liga Profesional	14	2	—		—		—		14	2
Independiente Rivadavia (loan)	2025	Liga Profesional	30	2	5	0	—		—		35	2
Independiente Rivadavia	2026	Liga Profesional	17	2	2	0	8 (Note: Appearances in Copa Libertadores)	0	—		27	2
Independiente Rivadavia	Independiente Rivadavia total		61	6	7	0	8	0	0	0	76	6
Career total			61	6	7	0	8	0	0	0	76	6

== Honours ==
Independiente Rivadavia

- Copa Argentina: 2025
