= Stefano Moreyra =

Argentine footballer (born 2001)

Personal information
- Full name: Stefano Nahuel Moreyra
- Date of birth: 19 September 2001 (age 25)
- Place of birth: Reconquista, Santa Fe, Argentina
- Height: 1.82 m (6 ft 0 in)
- Position: Midfielder

Team information
- Current team: Independiente Rivadavia (on loan from Instituto)
- Number: 34

Youth career
- Colón

Senior career*
Years	Team	Apps	(Gls)
2022–2026	Colón	29	(0)
2024–2025	→ Instituto (loan)	42	(1)
2026–	Instituto	0	(0)
2026–	→ Independiente Rivadavia (loan)	6	(0)
- * Club domestic league appearances and goals as of 16:33, 11 July 2026 (UTC)

Stefano Nahuel Moreyra is an Argentine professional footballer who plays as a midfielder for Independiente Rivadavia, on loan from Instituto.

== Career ==
Moreyra came through the youth setup at Colón and made his debut on 30 April 2022 in a 2–0 defeat to Arsenal Sarandí in the Copa de la Liga Profesional. In December, he signed his first professional contract with the club. In March 2023, he suffered a torn muscle in his foot in a match against Independiente, but was expected to recover quickly.

Following Colón's relegation to the Primera Nacional, he was loaned to Instituto on 2 January 2024. He became a key member in the team under Daniel Oldrá towards the end of 2025, and, on 9 November 2025, he scored the first goal of his career in a 2–1 defeat to Sarmiento.

On 2 January 2026, he was loaned to Independiente Rivadavia.

== Career statistics ==
As of 23 February 2026

Appearances and goals by club, season and competition
Club	Season	League			Cup (Note: Includes Copa Argentina)		Continental		Other		Total	
Club	Season	Division	Goals	Apps	Apps	Goals	Apps	Goals	Apps	Goals	Apps	Goals
Colón	2022	Liga Profesional	6	0	—		—		—		6	0
Colón	2023	Liga Profesional	23	0	3	0	—		—		26	0
Colón	Total		29	0	3	0	0	0	0	0	32	0
Instituto (loan)	2024	Liga Profesional	16	0	—		—		—		16	0
Instituto (loan)	2025	Liga Profesional	26	1	2	0	—		—		28	1
Instituto (loan)	Total		42	1	2	0	0	0	0	0	44	1
Independiente Rivadavia (loan)	2026	Liga Profesional	2	0	—		—		—		2	0
Career total			73	1	5	0	0	0	0	0	78	1
