= Luciano Gómez =

Argentine footballer

Personal information
- Full name: Luciano Luis Gómez
- Date of birth: 22 March 1996 (age 30)
- Place of birth: Corrientes, Argentina
- Height: 1.63 m (5 ft 4 in)
- Positions: Right-back; winger

Team information
- Current team: Independiente Rivadavia (on loan from Argentinos Juniors)
- Number: 14

Youth career
- Banfield

Senior career*
| Years | Team | Apps | (Gls) |
| 2016–2021 | Banfield | 79 | (0) |
| 2021 | → Argentinos Juniors (loan) | 14 | (0) |
| 2022– | Argentinos Juniors | 17 | (1) |
| 2023 | → Independiente (loan) | 13 | (0) |
| 2023–2024 | → Gimnasia LP (loan) | 7 | (0) |
| 2024– | → Independiente Rivadavia (loan) | 48 | (3) |
- * Club domestic league appearances and goals as of 16:27, 11 July 2026 (UTC)

Luciano Luis Gómez (born 22 March 1996) is an Argentine professional footballer who plays as a right-back or winger for Argentine Primera División team Independiente Rivadavia, on loan from Argentinos Juniors.

== Career ==
Gómez began with Banfield, with his debut coming in the Argentine Primera División against Arsenal de Sarandí on 12 February 2016.

In July 2021, Gómez joined Argentinos Juniors on loan for the rest of 2021 with a purchase option. In January 2022, the club triggered the option to sign him on a permanent deal.

== Career statistics ==
As of 18 May 2018.

Club statistics
| Club | Season | League | | | Cup (Note: Includes the Copa Argentina) | | League Cup | | Continental (Note: Includes the Copa Libertadores and Copa Sudamericana) | | Other | | Total | |
| Club | Season | Division | Apps | Goals | Apps | Goals | Apps | Goals | Apps | Goals | Apps | Goals | Apps | Goals |
|---|---|---|---|---|---|---|---|---|---|---|---|---|---|---|
| Banfield | 2016 | Primera División | 5 | 0 | 0 | 0 | — | | — | | 0 | 0 | 5 | 0 |
| Banfield | 2016–17 | Primera División | 10 | 0 | 1 | 0 | — | | 0 | 0 | 0 | 0 | 11 | 0 |
| Banfield | 2017–18 | Primera División | 9 | 0 | 0 | 0 | — | | 0 | 0 | 0 | 0 | 9 | 0 |
| Career total | | | 24 | 0 | 1 | 0 | — | | 0 | 0 | 0 | 0 | 25 | 0 |

== Honours ==
Independiente Rivadavia

- Copa Argentina: 2025
