= Alessandro Riep =

Chilean footballer

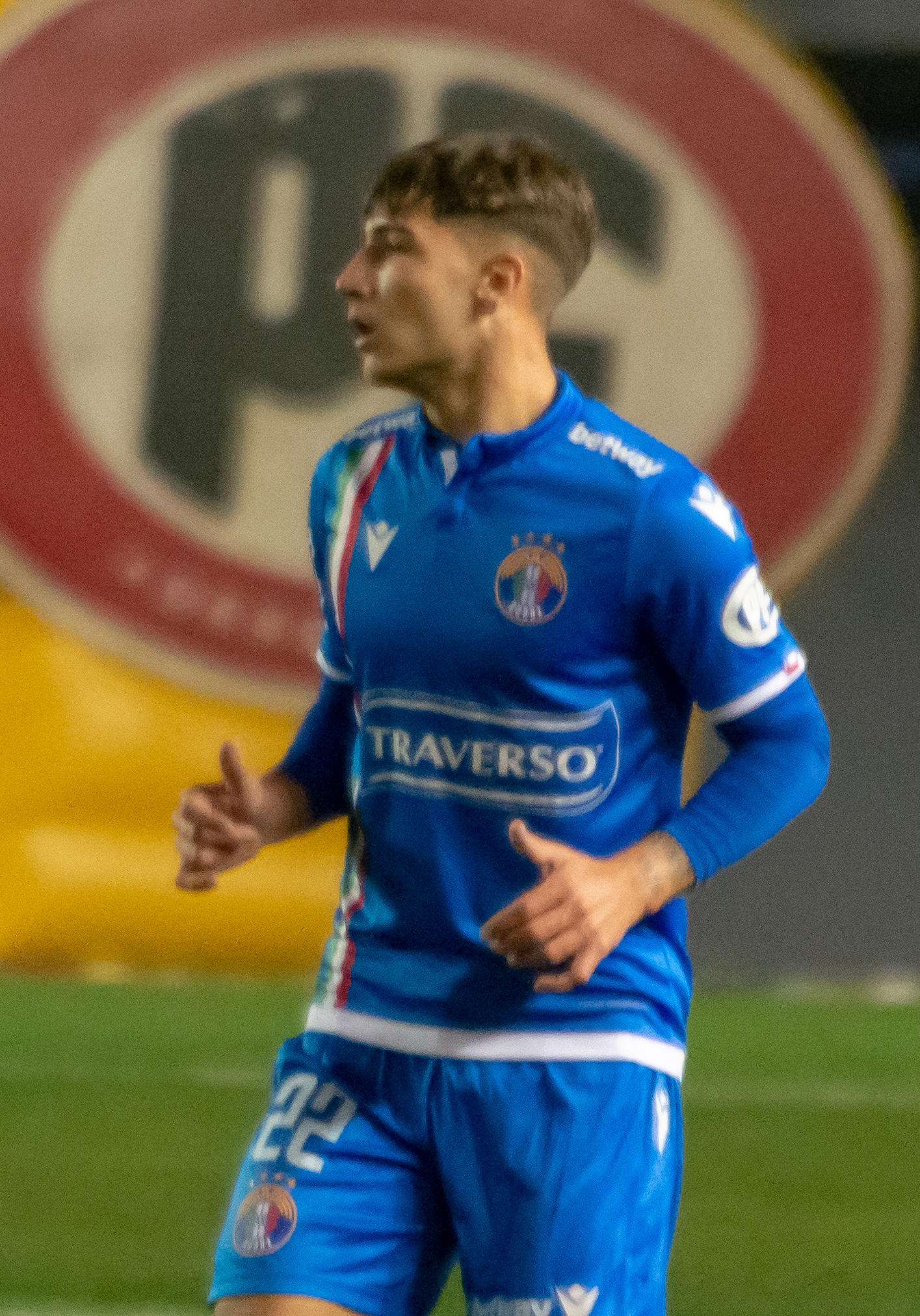
- Riep with Audax Italiano in 2023

Personal information
- Full name: Alessandro Riep Klekoc
- Date of birth: 3 July 2003 (age 23)
- Place of birth: Valparaíso, Chile
- Height: 1.74 m (5 ft 9 in)
- Position: Midfielder

Team information
- Current team: Independiente Rivadavia (on loan from Audax Italiano)
- Number: 20

Youth career
- Godoy Cruz
- Academia Chacras
- 2019–2021: Gimnasia de Mendoza

Senior career*
Years	Team	Apps	(Gls)
2021–2024	Gimnasia de Mendoza	5	(0)
2023–2024	→ Audax Italiano (loan)	37	(4)
2025–	Audax Italiano	14	(0)
2026–	→ Independiente Rivadavia (loan)	1	(0)
- * Club domestic league appearances and goals as of 16:31, 11 July 2026 (UTC)

Alessandro Riep Klekoc (born 3 July 2003) is a Chilean-Argentine professional footballer who plays as a midfielder for Independiente Rivadavia, on loan from Audax Italiano.

== Career ==
Born in Valparaíso, Chile, Riep moved to Argentina at early age and was with both Godoy Cruz and Academia Chacras before joining the Gimnasia de Mendoza youth system in 2019. He made his professional debut in a Primera Nacional match against Estudiantes de Río Cuarto on 5 July 2021.

In 2023, Riep returned to his country of birth by signing on loan with Audax Italiano in the top division. At the end of 2024, he renewed with them. In January 2026, he was loaned out to Argentine club Independiente Rivadavia on a deal for a year with an option to buy.

== Personal life ==
Riep is the son of the former Argentine football midfielder Rodrigo Riep, who also played in Chile. His older brother, Gianluca, is also a former footballer who played for clubs in Venezuela and Chile.
