= Luis Sequeira (footballer) =

Argentine footballer

Personal information
- Full name: Luis Alberto Sequeira
- Date of birth: 8 January 2003 (age 23)
- Place of birth: Maquinista Savio, Argentina
- Height: 1.72 m (5 ft 8 in)
- Position: Midfielder

Team information
- Current team: Independiente Rivadavia (on loan from Talleres)
- Number: 77

Youth career
- San Lorenzo

Senior career*
Years	Team	Apps	(Gls)
2019–2023	San Lorenzo	4	(0)
2023–	Talleres	24	(1)
2024–2025	→ Independiente Rivadavia (loan)	36	(3)
2026–	→ Independiente Rivadavia (loan)	2	(0)

International career
2018	Argentina U17	1	(0)
- * Club domestic league appearances and goals as of 16:34, 11 July 2026 (UTC)

Luis Alberto Sequeira (born 8 January 2003) is an Argentine professional footballer who plays as a midfielder for Independiente Rivadavia, on loan from Talleres.

== Professional career ==
Sequeira made his professional debut with San Lorenzo in a 3-0 Argentine Primera División win over Argentinos Juniors on 9 November 2019.
