= Bajo Flores =

Neighborhood in Buenos Aires, Argentina

Bajo Flores is the south zone of the Flores neighborhood of Buenos Aires City, Argentina.

It is separated from the rest of the neighborhood by the Moreno, Balbastro, Varela and Castañares avenues. Due to the Law 2329, signed on the 10 May, 2007, its limits have been established within the Nueva Pompeya neighborhood boundaries.

The neighborhood is characterized by its low houses and its low population density, where the Barrio Municipal Presidente Rivadavia (President Rivadavia Municipal Neighborhood), the Barrio Presidente Illia (President Illia Neighborhood) and the populous villa 1-11-14 (village 1–11–14), inhabited mainly by immigrants from Bolivia, Peru and Paraguay, meet.

Bajo Flores is home to Club Atlético San Lorenzo de Almagro Sports City and its stadium, the Estadio Pedro Bidegain (popularly known as "Nuevo Gasómetro").

There are also the headquarters and sports fields of several clubs such as DAOM and Piñero, and the sports field of the Club Italiano (where its rugby union and field hockey teams play their home games); other facilities in Bajo Flores are the Argentinos Juniors training fields and the club Deportivo Español stadium, which was the first built, giving a strong social push to the whole Bajo Flores neighborhood.

Bajo Flores is also the site of the Depósito de Agua Flores (Flores water deposit) and the San José de Flores Cemetery, the third cemetery to open in the City of Buenos Aires.

== In popular culture ==
The 2001 novel Shantytown (Spanish: La Villa) by Cesár Aira is set in Bajo Flores.
