= Estadio Bautista Gargantini =

Football stadium in Mendoza, Argentina

Bautista Gargantini Stadium
- Estadio Bautista Gargantini
- La Catedral

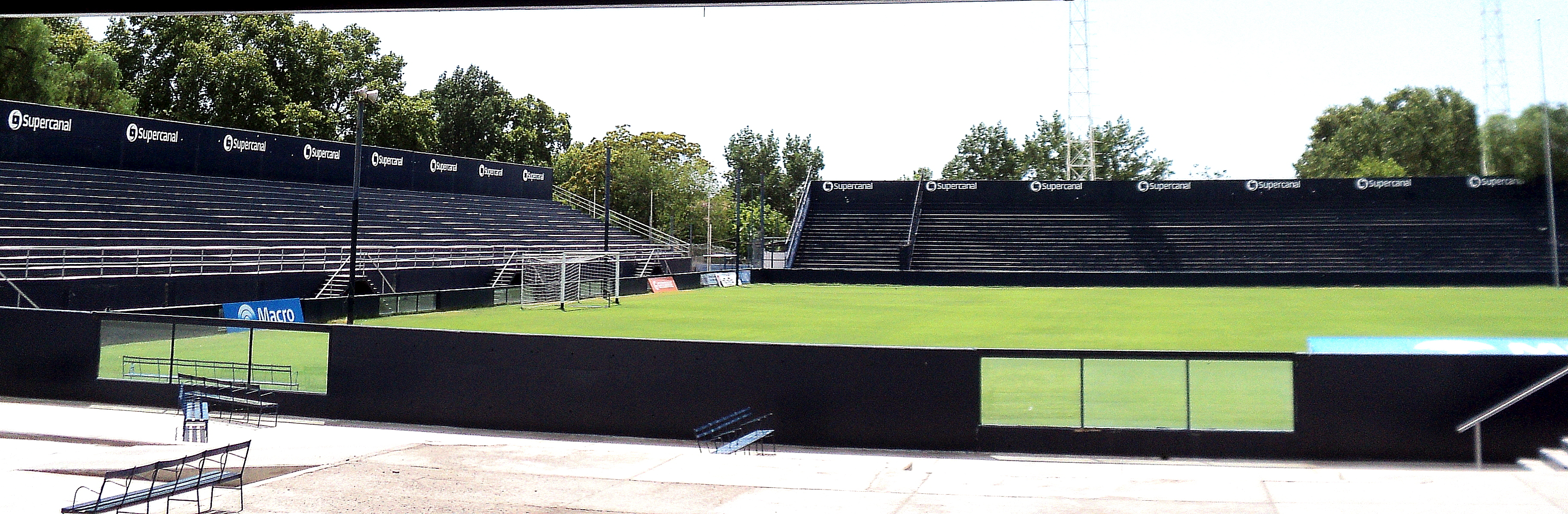
- The stadium as seen in 2010
- Interactive map of Bautista Gargantini Stadium
- Address: Av. Boulogne Sur Mer and Av. Villanueva, Mendoza; Argentina
- Owner: Club Independiente Rivadavia
- Capacity: 24,000
- Surface: Grass
- Field size: 100 x 70 m

Construction
- Opened: 5 April 1925; 101 years ago

Tenants
- Independiente Rivadavia; Argentina national rugby team (2002)

Estadio Bautista Gargantini is a stadium located on General San Martín Park in the city of Mendoza, Argentina. It is owned and operated by Club Independiente Rivadavia. The stadium holds 16,000 people, being the 2nd. largest stadium in the province after Estadio Malvinas Argentinas.

The stadium is named after Bautista Gargantini, one of the founding members of Independiente Rivadavia and five-times president of the institution. Gargantini was one of the initiators of the merger of Club Atlético Independiente and Club Sportivo Rivadavia, which resulted in the creation of "Independiente Rivadavia".

In 2024, Independiente Rivadavia drew an average home attendance of 23,488 in the Argentine top-flight football league.

== History ==
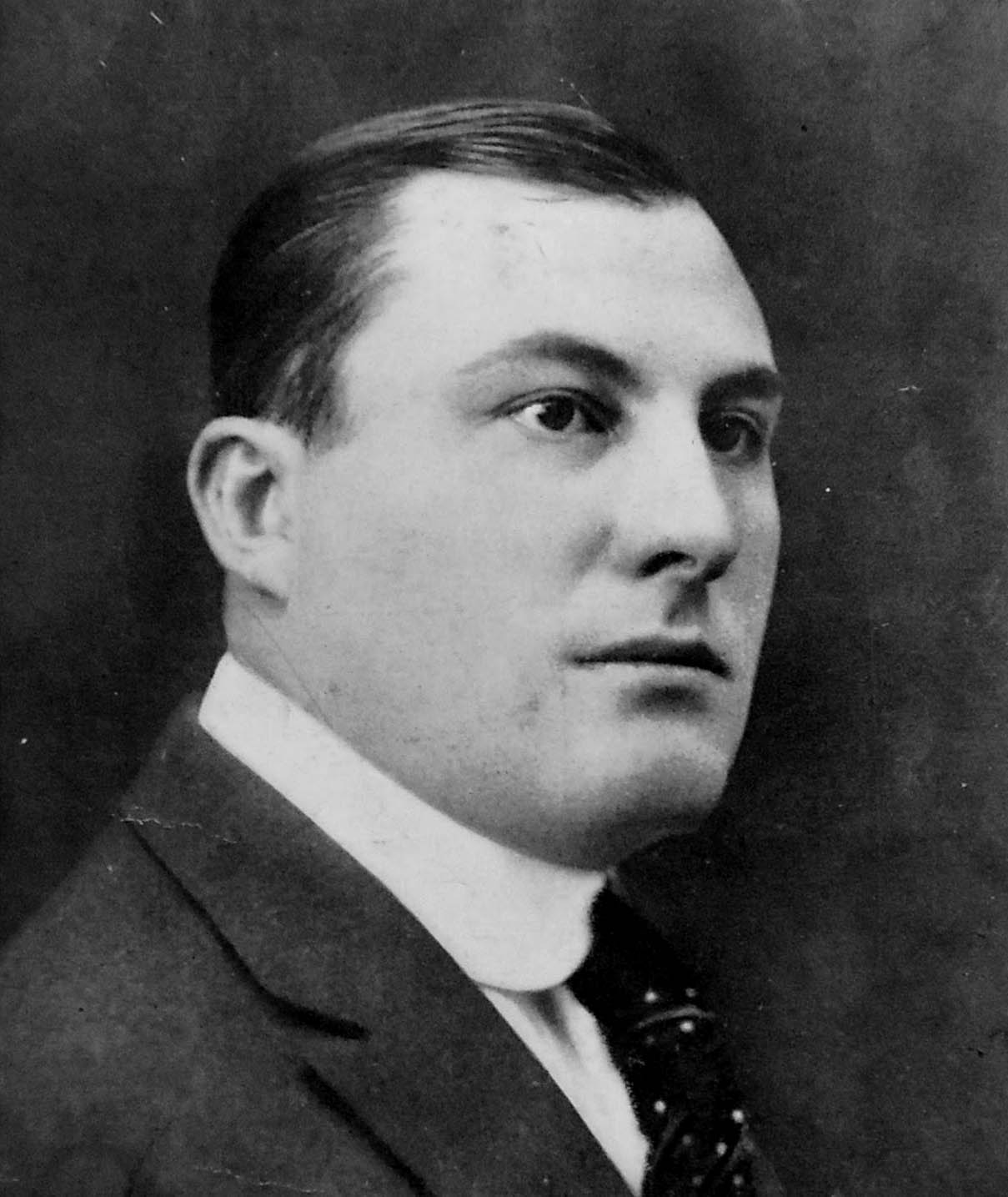
Bautista Gargantini, founding member of Independiente Rivadavia and president of the club on five occasions

The stadium is located on a land granted by Governor of Mendoza, José Néstor Lencinas, to Club Independiente Rivadavia in 1923. The stadium was inaugurated on 5 April 1925 in a match vs Uruguayan club Peñarol, won by the visitor team 2–0.

The grandstand known as tribuna oeste was the first concrete-built grandstand in Argentina.

During successive years, the stadium was refurbished several times. Remodelations included the construction of a new grandstand in 1965, and then other two grandstands on the east and north sides. The stadium was reinaugurated in October 2008 after a new refurbishment that included the removal of the fences surrounding the pitch, new locker rooms and substitutes benches, entrances, and the construction of a pit to keep the distance between spectators and players. Refurbishments were completed in 2011.

In rugby union, the stadium was the host of all matches played by Argentina at the 2002 South American Rugby Championship.
