= Iván Villalba =

Paraguayan footballer (born 1995)

Personal information
- Full name: Iván Emilio Villalba Chamorro
- Date of birth: January 19, 1995 (age 31)
- Place of birth: Asunción, Paraguay
- Height: 1.82 m (6 ft 0 in)
- Position: Defender

Team information
- Current team: Independiente Rivadavia
- Number: 40

Senior career*
Years	Team	Apps	(Gls)
2015	Libertad	0	(0)
2015	→ Imbabura (loan)		(3)
2016	Manta		(1)
2016–2017	Rubio Ñu	19	(1)
2017	→ Peñarol (loan)	11	(0)
2018–2021	Sol de América	79	(4)
2021	Santa Fe	5	(0)
2022	Cobresal	22	(1)
2023	Guaireña	13	(0)
2023–2024	Sportivo Luqueño	25	(2)
2024–	Independiente Rivadavia	63	(3)
- * Club domestic league appearances and goals as of 16:30, 11 July 2026 (UTC)

Iván Emilio Villalba Chamorro (born 19 January 1995 in Paraguay) is a Paraguayan footballer who plays as a centre-back for Argentine club Independiente Rivadavia.

== Career ==
Villalba started his senior career with Club Libertad. After that, he played for Imbabura S.C., Manta, Club Rubio Ñú, Rubio Ñu and Peñarol. In 2018, he signed for Club Sol de América in the Paraguayan Primera División, where he has made eighty-nine appearances and scored four goals.

In 2022, Villalba moved to Chile and joined Cobresal in the top division.

In the second half of 2024, Villalba signed with Argentine Primera División club Independiente Rivadavia from Sportivo Luqueño.

== Honours ==
Independiente Rivadavia

- Copa Argentina: 2025
