= Alfredo Berti =

Argentine footballer and manager

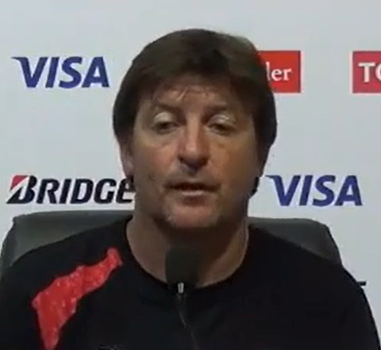
- Berti in 2014

Personal information
- Full name: Alfredo Jesús Berti
- Date of birth: 5 October 1971 (age 55)
- Place of birth: Empalme Villa Constitución, Argentina
- Position: Midfielder

Team information
- Current team: Independiente Rivadavia (manager)

Senior career*
Years	Team	Apps	(Gls)
1992–1995	Newell's Old Boys	144	(5)
1995	Atlas	11	(0)
1996	América de Cali	0	(0)
1997–2000	Boca Juniors	20	(0)

Managerial career
- 2007–2010: Chile (assistant)
- 2010–2013: Newell's Old Boys (reserves)
- 2013–2014: Newell's Old Boys
- 2014: Aldosivi
- 2017: Independiente Rivadavia
- 2017–2018: Argentinos Juniors
- 2019: Belgrano
- 2020: Central Córdoba (SdE)
- 2021: Sportivo Luqueño
- 2022: Barracas Central
- 2023: Independiente Rivadavia
- 2024–: Independiente Rivadavia
- * Club domestic league appearances and goals

Alfredo Jesús Berti (born 5 October 1971) is an Argentine football manager and former player who played as a midfielder. He is the current manager of Independiente Rivadavia.

== Career ==
Berti managed Newell's Old Boys from 24 July 2013 to 11 April 2014, replacing Gerardo Martino. He was also the successor of Gabriel Heinze at Argentinos Juniors in 2017.

== Managerial statistics ==
As of 27 October 2026

Managerial record by team and tenure
Team	Nat	From	To	Record							
Team	Nat	From	To	G	W	D	L	GF	GA	GD	Win %
Newell's Old Boys	(Argentina)	24 July 2013	11 April 2014	37	13	14	10	49	38	+11	35.14
Aldosivi	(Argentina)	19 June 2014	28 October 2014	15	4	6	5	10	12	−2	26.67
Independiente Rivadavia	(Argentina)	25 April 2017	3 August 2017	16	7	5	4	20	13	+7	43.75
Argentinos Juniors	(Argentina)	4 August 2017	17 September 2018	35	14	8	13	40	35	+5	40.00
Belgrano	(Argentina)	1 July 2019	6 October 2019	14	2	7	5	17	20	−3	14.29
Central Córdoba	(Argentina)	1 June 2020	5 December 2020	6	1	2	3	17	20	−3	16.67
Sportivo Luqueño	(Paraguay)	19 May 2021	13 September 2021	11	4	1	6	12	21	−9	36.36
Barracas Central	(Argentina)	1 March 2022	21 July 2022	21	9	4	8	30	34	−4	42.86
Independiente Rivadavia	(Argentina)	3 April 2023	16 November 2023	28	19	5	4	39	19	+20	67.86
Independiente Rivadavia	(Argentina)	27 August 2024	present	97	42	33	22	129	105	+24	43.30
Total				280	115	85	80	351	306	+45	41.07
