= Independiente Rivadavia =

Argentine football club

- Full name: Club Sportivo Independiente Rivadavia
- Nicknames: Azul; Azul del Parque; Caudillos del Parque; Lepra
- Founded: 24 January 1913; 113 years ago
- Ground: Estadio Bautista Gargantini
- Capacity: 24,000
- Chairman: Daniel Vila
- Manager: Alfredo Berti
- League: Primera División
- 2024: 11th
- Website: independienterivadavia.com.ar
Home colours	Away colours	Third colours

Club Sportivo Independiente Rivadavia (CSIR), mostly known simply as Independiente Rivadavia, is a football club from Mendoza, Argentina. The team currently plays in the Argentine Primera División, the first major league in the Argentine Football league system.

Independiente Rivadavia played in the Argentine Primera in 1968, 1973, 1977, 1979–80 and 1982, when the team reached the quarter-finals of the National Championship. That year Independiente was eliminated in the play-offs by the team that would later reach the Championship, Ferro Carril Oeste.

== History ==
The origins of the club can be traced to 1902, when predecessor "Club Belgrano" was established in a bakery owned by Luis Burotto and his sons. In 1911 the club was severely punished by Federación Mendocina de Football (which ruled football in Mendoza Province at that time). After two years of hiatus so the banned was still into force, a group of members decided to break with the federation to form a new club. Therefore on 24 January 1913 they established "Club Atlético Independiente", with Pedro Castro elected as the first president of the club. The institution also changed to original Belgrano colors (dark green), adopting a shirt with red, white, and green vertical stripes so they earned the tricolores nickname.

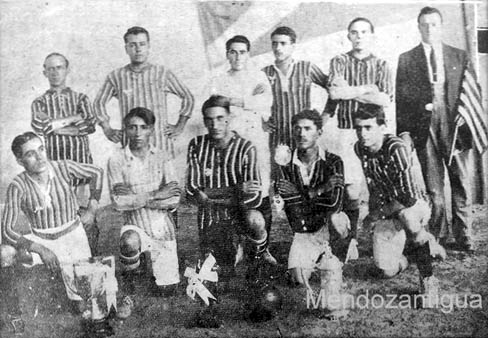
Team of Independiente Rivadavia with the original red, green, and white striped shirt, c. 1913–1919

Independiente Rivadavia won eight consecutive regional championships between 1913 and 1920. The club was one of the founding members of "Liga Mendocina de Fútbol", established 1921. Independiente would become the most winning team in Mendoza, with a total of 25 titles won.

On January 4, 1919 and following an idea by entrepreneur and politician Bautista Gargantini (1891–1985), the club merged with "Club Sportivo Rivadavia" so the new entity adopted the name "Club Sportivo Independiente Rivadavia". Gargantini was also the first president after the merger and the person who proposed blue as the shirt color, which has remained until present days.

In 1920, the club organized a benefit match for the Carlos Washington Lencinas Infectious Diseases Hospital, which was also attended by leprosy patients. Because of that match, the club earned the nickname leprosos (lepper), although there are other versions about the nickname.

Independiente Rivadavia took part in six Nacional championship, the regionalised competition of Primera División. The team competed in the 1968, 1973, 1977, 1979, 1980, and 1982 editions, being 1982 the only time Independiente Rivadavia qualified to quarterfinals, when they were eliminated by then champions Ferro Carril Oeste.

In 2023, Independiente Rivadavia promoted to the top division of Argentina, Liga Profesional, for the first time in their history after winning the 2023 Primera Nacional championship when they defeated Almirante Brown 2–0 in the final.

On November 5, 2025, Independiente Rivadavia won their first title in Primera División, the 2025 Copa Argentina, after defeating Argentinos Juniors 5–3 on penalties (the match had ended 2–2 on regular time). The title earned the squad qualification for the 2026 Copa Libertadores. The championship was widely celebrated in Mendoza, where the Independiente Rivadavia players were welcomed by a huge crowd of club supporters.

== Players ==
=== Current squad ===
As of 23 September 2026

Note: Flags indicate national team as defined under FIFA eligibility rules; some limited exceptions apply. Players may hold more than one non-FIFA nationality.

No.	Pos.	Nation	Player
2	DF	URU	Leonard Costa
3	DF	ARG	Juan Elordi (on loan from Racing Club)
5	MF	ARG	Tomás Bottari
6	DF	ARG	Santiago Cena
7	FW	ARG	Victorio Ramis
8	MF	ARG	Leonel Bucca
9	FW	PAR	Álex Arce
10	MF	ARG	Matías Fernández
11	MF	ARG	Gonzalo Ríos
12	GK	ARG	Ramiro Macagno (on loan from Levadiakos)
13	DF	ARG	Alejo Osella
14	DF	ARG	Luciano Gómez (on loan from Argentinos Juniors)
17	FW	ARG	Maximiliano Salas (on loan from River Plate)
19	FW	ARG	Rodrigo Atencio (on loan from Sport Recife])

No.	Pos.	Nation	Player
20	FW	ARG	Alessandro Riep (on loan from Audax Italiano)
21	GK	ARG	Emmanuel Gómez Riga (on loan from Alvarado)
23	MF	COL	Luis Díaz
25	MF	PAR	José Florentín
27	MF	ARG	Diego Crego
28	DF	ARG	Alex Vigo
30	GK	ARG	Nicolás Bolcato
32	MF	ARG	Kevin Vázquez (on loan from Vélez Sarsfield)
34	MF	ARG	Stefano Moreyra
36	DF	ARG	Ezequiel Bonifacio
40	DF	PAR	Iván Villalba
42	DF	ARG	Sheyko Studer
43	FW	ARG	Fabrizio Sartori
77	MF	ARG	Luis Sequeira (on loan from Talleres)

=== Reserve squad ===
Note: Flags indicate national team as defined under FIFA eligibility rules; some limited exceptions apply. Players may hold more than one non-FIFA nationality.

No.	Pos.	Nation	Player
41	GK	ARG	Fernando Bravo
45	FW	ARG	Luciano Sábato
47	MF	ARG	Facundo Ortiz
49	DF	ARG	Luciano Suárez
51	DF	ARG	Amaro Maya
52	MF	ARG	Sebastian Muñoz
53	FW	ARG	Joaquin Ibañez
54	MF	ARG	Tomas Arias
55	DF	ARG	Matías Salvo
56	FW	ARG	Tobías Ganduglia
57	DF	ARG	Agustín Domínguez

No.	Pos.	Nation	Player
58	MF	ARG	Benjamín Olivarez
59	GK	ARG	Kevin Pagliaroli
60	MF	ARG	Lautaro Torres
62	MF	ARG	Alex Aguado
63	FW	ARG	Axel Leiva
64	DF	ARG	Román Ruiz
65	FW	ARG	Agustín Rognoni
66	MF	ARG	Julian Reyna
67	DF	ARG	Alexander Lucero
68	MF	ARG	Thiago Sosa

=== Out on loan ===
Note: Flags indicate national team as defined under FIFA eligibility rules; some limited exceptions apply. Players may hold more than one non-FIFA nationality.

No.	Pos.	Nation	Player
4	DF	ARG	Mauro Peinipil (at Colón until 31 December 2026)
17	FW	PAR	Iván Valdez (at Nacional until 31 December 2026)

=== Current coaching staff ===
Position	Staff
Head coach	(Argentina) Alfredo Berti
Assistant coach	(Argentina) Martín Spuch
Assistant coach	(Argentina) Santiago Flores
Fitness coach	(Argentina) Leandro Retamoza
Fitness coach	(Argentina) Ramiro Luguercio
Goalkeeping coach	(Argentina) Diego Próspero
Physiotherapist	(Argentina) Javier López
Doctor	(Argentina) Federico Carmona

Last updated: 5 May 2025
Source: Cuerpo Técnico 2025

=== Former managers ===
- (Argentina) Juan Carlos Murúa (1983–1985)
- (Argentina) Claudio "Turco" García
- (Argentina) Darío Felman (2003–2004)
- (Argentina) Roque Alfaro (2006)
- (Argentina) Roberto Trotta (2006–2007), (2007–2008)
- (Argentina) Fernando Quiroz (2009–2010)
- (Argentina) Jorge Luis Ghiso (2010)
- (Argentina) Roberto Trotta (2013–2014)
- (Argentina) Ricardo Rodriguez (2014)
- (Argentina) Daniel Garnero (2014–2015)
- (Argentina) Pablo Quinteros (2015–2016)
- (Argentina) Felipe Canedo (2016)
- (Argentina) Daniel Cordoba (2016)
- (Argentina) Martín Astudillo (2016–2017)
- (Argentina) Alfredo Berti (2017)
- (Argentina) José Romero (2017)
- (Argentina) Pablo De Muner (2017)
- (Argentina) Gabriel Gómez (2017–2019)
- (Argentina) Luciano Theiler (2019)
- (Argentina) Matías Minich (2019–2020)
- (Argentina) Marcelo Straccia (2020–2021)
- (Argentina) Gabriel Gómez (2021–2022)
- (Argentina) Ever Demalde (2022–2023)
- (Argentina) Alfredo Berti (2023)
- (Argentina) Rodolfo De Paoli (2023–2024)
- (Argentina) Martín Cicotello (2024)
- (Argentina) Alfredo Berti (2024–)

== Team image ==
=== Uniform evolution ===
The first uniform adopted by Independiente Rivadavia was a shirt with red, white, and green vertical strips. When the club merged with Club Sportivo Rivadavia and after an initiative by Bautista Gargantini, it switched to a dark blue shirt, which would become the definitive colors of the institution.

1913–19	1920–present

== Titles ==
=== National ===
- Copa Argentina (1): 2025
- Primera Nacional (1): 2023
- Torneo Argentino A (2): 1998–99, 2006–07

=== Regional ===
- Federación Mendocina de Football (4): 1913, 1914, 1915, 1916
- Unión Mendocina de Football (4): 1917, 1918, 1919, 1920
- Copa Competencia 1917–1921 (4): 1917, 1918, 1919 1920
- Primera A de Liga Mendocina (25): 1924, 1925, 1926, 1927, 1928, 1929, 1932, 1935, 1936, 1938, 1940, 1945, 1960, 1961, 1962, 1965, 1967, 1970, 1972, 1976, 1978, 1992–93, 1993–94, 2007 (formativa), 2010
- Primera B de Liga Mendocina (1):: 1998
- Copa Competencia (5): 1924, 1925, 1926, 1929, 1932
