= History of Club de Gimnasia y Esgrima La Plata (football) =

Club de Gimnasia y Esgrima La Plata was founded on June 3, 1887, as "Club de Gimnasia y Esgrima", initially with fencing as its main activity, as its name in Spanish indicated. Association football (the sport for which the club is mostly known) was added at the beginning of the 20th century.

In 1915, Gimnasia y Esgrima was promoted to the first division after becoming champions of the División Intermedia, the second division of Argentine football league system by then. That same year the club also won the Copa Bullrich.

Later, in 1929, the club would become champions of Primera División, its first title in the top division. Once in the professional era, Gimnasia became champions of the Segunda División in 1944, 1947 and 1952 and won the Copa Centenario de la AFA in 1994. Additionally, the squad has been a runner-up in the Primera División on five occasions and runner-up of 2017-18 Copa Argentina. The club has remained at the top level of Argentine football for 96 seasons, giving it with Huracán the eighth longest participation at this level.

== Beginning ==
At the beginning of the 20th century Gimnasia was taking part, among with other institutions as Facultad de Medicina, Porteño, Belgrano AC and River Plate, in the third division of Argentina. The club also had a team competing in the junior category (under 17-year-old).

In 1905, Gimnasia had to left the field located in 13 and 71 street, so the club decided to suspend all football activities, focusing on social activities. This caused that many members left the club to form their own institution, which was named "Estudiantes de La Plata". In 1912, a group of football players who were in conflict with Estudiantes de La Plata joined Club Independencia. This club merged with Gimnasia y Esgrima in 1914, restarting the practise of football.

== Promotion and debut in Primera ==
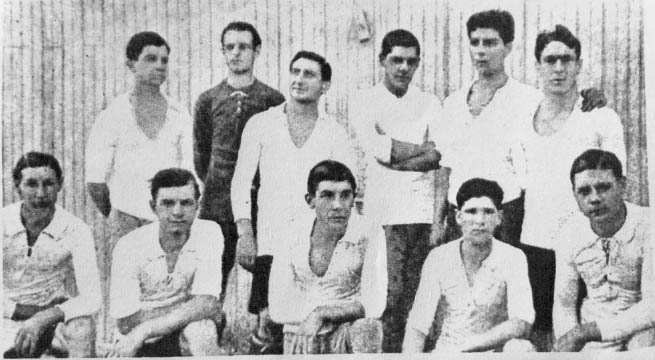
The team that promoted to Primera División in 1915.

After leaving football for a few years, the club restarted the practise of the sport in 1912. Three years later the squad promoted to the first division after defeating Honor y Patria by 3–1, on December 15, 1915.

Some of the players that achieved promotion were Emilio Fernández, Diómedes Bernasconi, Luis Basérico, Ricardo Naón, Roberto Felices, Edmundo Ferreiroa, H. Negri, Angelo Bottaro, Ricardo Gazcón, José Torres Amaral, Manuel Alvarez, Horacio Sancet, José Iglesias, Ernesto Guruciaga, Ignacio Bulla, Pedro Schiaffino, Sebastián Galesio, Clemente Lastra, Sebastián Mansilla, Delfín Derves, Antonio Gismano, Jorge Garbarino, Laureano Spósito Arrieta and Oreste Rutta.

The same year Gimnasia also won the Copa de Competencia Adolfo J. Bullrich and the División Intermedia league championship.

On April 27, 1916, Gimnasia faced Estudiantes for the first time. The match was played at Estudiantes field, the Estadio Jorge Luis Hirschi, being won by Gimnasia y Esgrima by 1–0.

On April 27, 1924, the club inaugurated the stadium located in the intersection of the 60th avenue and 118th street, later named Estadio Juan Carmelo Zerillo. Gimnasia y Esgrima remained a record-15 months unbeaten there (from its first official meeting until July, 1925). This year achieves the second place, behind San Lorenzo, with 15 victories, 7 ties and 1 defeat.

== First title in Primera and European tour ==
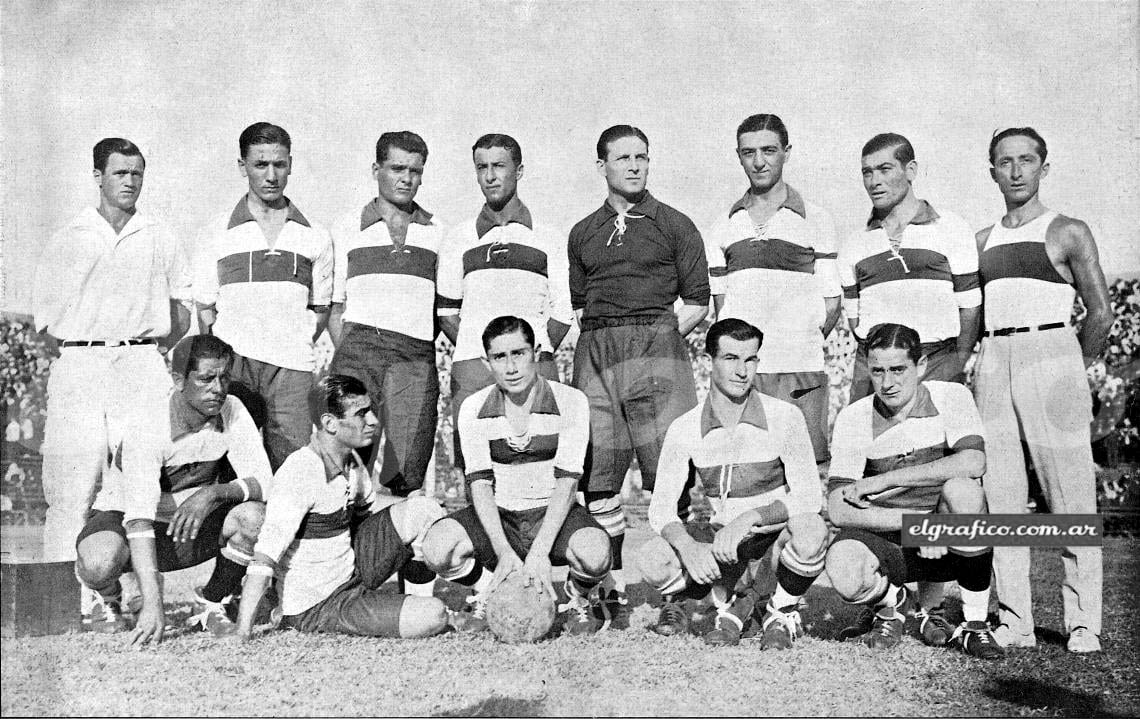
The 1929 team that won its only Primera División title to date. Francisco Varallo is seated second, from left to right

In 1929 Gimnasia y Esgrima won its first Primera División title, after a campaign that finished with 14 victories and 3 defeats. The squad got 28 points in 17 matches played, with some highlights victories over Estudiantes (4–1) and River Plate (1–0). The championship final was played on 9 February 1930 at old River Plate stadium (located on Alvear and Tagle), where Gimnasia defeated Boca Juniors 2–1, winning the title. The line-up was: Scarpone; Di Giano, Delovo; Ruscitti, Santillán, Belli; Curell, Varallo, Maleanni, Díaz, Morgada.

Between December 1930 and April 1931, Gimnasia, which later would be known as "El Expreso" (in English, "The Express"), toured Europe and Brazil. Gimnasia became the first Argentine club outside Greater Buenos Aires to compete in Europe, and the first ever to play in Portugal, Czechoslovakia, Austria and Italy.

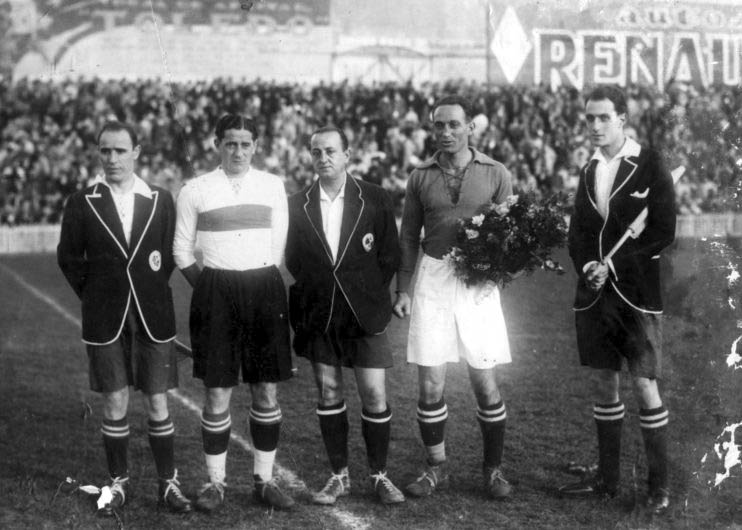
Gimnasia and Real Madrid captains posing with the referees before the match at Estadio Chamartín, January 1931

The tour began on December 8, 1930, and the team disputed a total of 27 matches in four months, something unusual for that time.

Gimnasia played two matches in Brazil, the first of them against the Vasco da Gama, which ended tied at one goal. Four days later Gimnasia was defeated by a "Carioca" combined team by 4–0. Another important fact about those matches was that Gimnasia played in stadiums with night lights, service not yet implemented on Argentina by that time.

After the games in Brazilian lands, the team went to Spain on board a ship "Asturias". Gimnasia y Esgrima played its first match in Spain facing Real Madrid, winning by 3-2 and becoming the first team in the country to beat Real Madrid as visitor. The next day, Spanish press entitled: "The Argentine players seem to have been born to play football". The line-up vs Real Madrid was Pottazo, Barrio, De Lobo, Conti, Chalu, Belli, Sandoval, Arrillaga, Díaz, De Mario, Morgada.

On January 6, Gimnasia played FC Barcelona at its stadium, achieving another notable victory by 2-1 over the "Azulgrana".

Tour match details
Date	Rival	Country toured	Score
December 13, 1930	Vasco da Gama	Brazil	1-1
December 17, 1930	Carioca Combined	Brazil	0-4
January 1, 1931	Real Madrid	Spain	3-2
January 6, 1931	Barcelona	Spain	2-1
January 11, 1931	Marino FC	Spain	3-1
January 15, 1931	Real Victoria (Note: This team merged with the clubs Marino FC, CD Gran Canaria, Unión Atlético and Arenas founding the UD Las Palmas in 1949.)	Spain	2-1
January 18, 1931	Real Victoria	Spain	1-1
January 23, 1931	Marino FC	Spain	4-0
January 25, 1931	Real Victoria	Spain	0-2
January 31, 1931	Red Star (Note: Red Star, club founded in 1897 currently playing at the fourth category of French football.)	France	0-2
February 2, 1931	Bermen	Germany	3-6
February 8, 1931	Sportverein 1860	Germany	1-1
February 15, 1931	Sportverein 1860	Germany	4-0
February 21, 1931	Polizer Sport	Germany	4-2
February 22, 1931	Vereim Fur Fortuna	Germany	0-0
February 28, 1931	Düsseldorf Combined	Germany	2-1
March 1, 1931	Tennis Borussia Berlin	Germany	1-2
March 4, 1931	Vereim Fur Fortuna	Germany	3-1
March 8, 1931	AC Sparta Praha	Czech Republic	3-1
March 12, 1931	WAC Rapid (Viena)	Austria	1-2
March 15, 1931	Ambrosiana	Italy	3-3
March 19, 1931	Napoli	Italy	2-2
March 25, 1931	Barcelona	Spain	0-3
March 29, 1931	Benfica	Portugal	1-0
April 14, 1931	Vasco Da Gama	Brazil	2-2
April 16, 1931	Corinthians	Brazil	0-0
April 23, 1931	Palestra (San Pablo)	Brazil	1-2

== "El Expreso" ==
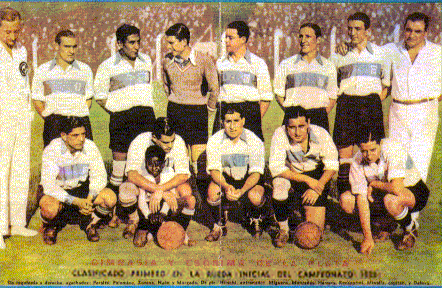
The team of 1933, nicknamed El Expreso.

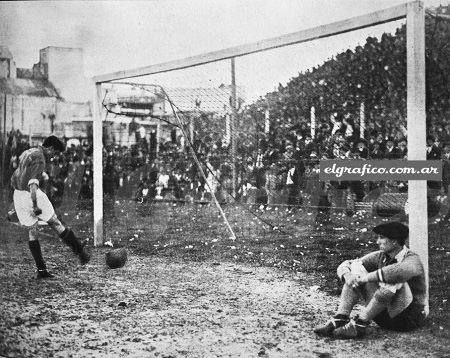
Goalkeeper Herrera let San Lorenzo players to score goals without opposing, as a protest against the referee performance. The match, played in 1933, ended 7–1.

During the 1933 Argentine championship, Gimnasia y Esgrima made a great campaign with a team that achieved large victories at the beginning of the tournament. Gimnasia thrashed Vélez Sarsfield (4–0), Boca Juniors (5–2), Talleres (BA) (5–2), Tigre (7–1) and Chacarita Juniors (5–1) amongst other rivals. The newspaper Crítica nicknamed the team "El Expreso" (The Express) comparing it with a locomotive that "Can't be stopped by neither anything nor anyone". Gimnasia finished the first round placed 1st. During the second round, with 9 fixtures remaining, Gimnasia played Boca Juniors at La Bombonera. With a partial advantage of Gimnasia by 2-1, the referee awarded a penalty kick to Boca Juniors after a nonexistent foul. Short later, Boca scored another goal in evident offside position, finally winning the match by 3–2.

Two fixtures later Gimnasia had to play San Lorenzo de Almagro. During the match, referee Alberto Rojo Miró favoured so blatantly San Lorenzo that the Gimnasia players refused to continue playing, starting a "went on strike." They sat on the field, while San Lorenzo scored unopposedly, before the referee ended the game with a 7–1 outcome. The 1933 team ended in the fourth place (San Lorenzo was the champion) with a record of 21 victories, 4 draws and 9 defeats.

The Expreso is still regarded by the media and fans as one of the finest Gimnasia teams ever. The top scorer was Arturo "El Torito" Naón with 33 goals.

== Irregular performances (1934-1960) ==
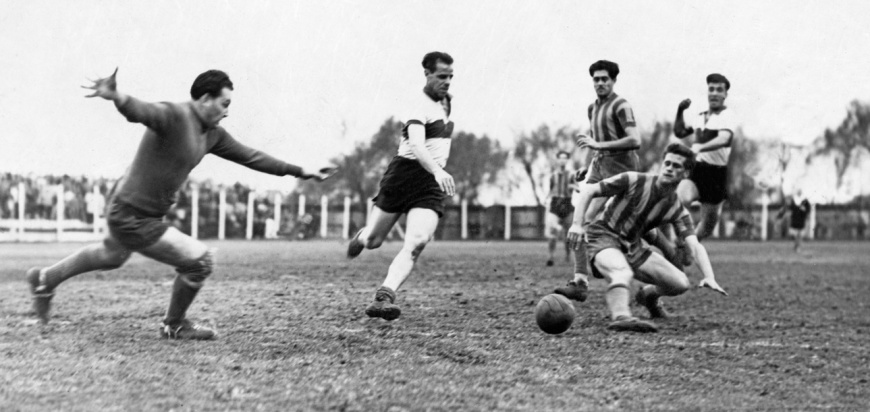
Antonio Sastre carrying the ball in a match v. Defensores de Belgrano in 1947, the year Gimnasia y Esgrima won the Segunda División championship.

In 1934, Gimnasia finished in ninth place after securing 14 wins, 10 draws and 15 defeats, with Arturo Naón as top scorer with his 25 goals. The following year, the team finished in the number 13 position, where the highlights were the victories River Plate (6–4), Platense (8–2) and champion Boca Juniors (1–0).

During the decade of the 40s, Gimnasia had erratic performances, which cost the team to be relegated to the Segunda División several times. In 1943 Gimnasia made a bad campaign, finishing last and therefore being relegated. The following year, Gimnasia had 31 victories, 4 draws and 5 defeats, achieving its first title in Segunda and promoting to the top division. Nevertheless, the newly promoted squad finished the 1945 Primera championship in the last place being relegated for the second time within three seasons.

Gimnasia remained in the Primera B during the first two seasons (1946 and 1947). In 1947, the team was crowned champion after 25 wins, 7 draws and 6 defeats and returned to the first division, with playmaker Antonio Sastre (who had returned from Sao Paulo as the most renowned player of the team. In 1948 Gimnasia y Esgrima made a bad campaign again, which comes last in the table of positions, but the team remained in Primera so there were no relegation that season. The following two years, Gimnasia made modest campaigns.

In 1951, the Gimnasia's first team finished last in Leaderboard and fell off category again. In 1952 it was crowned champion of the second division and returned to first division. During the remaining years of the decade (1953–1960), Gimnasia disputed all the championships of first division finishing most of the times by the middle of the table of positions.

== Minor titles ==
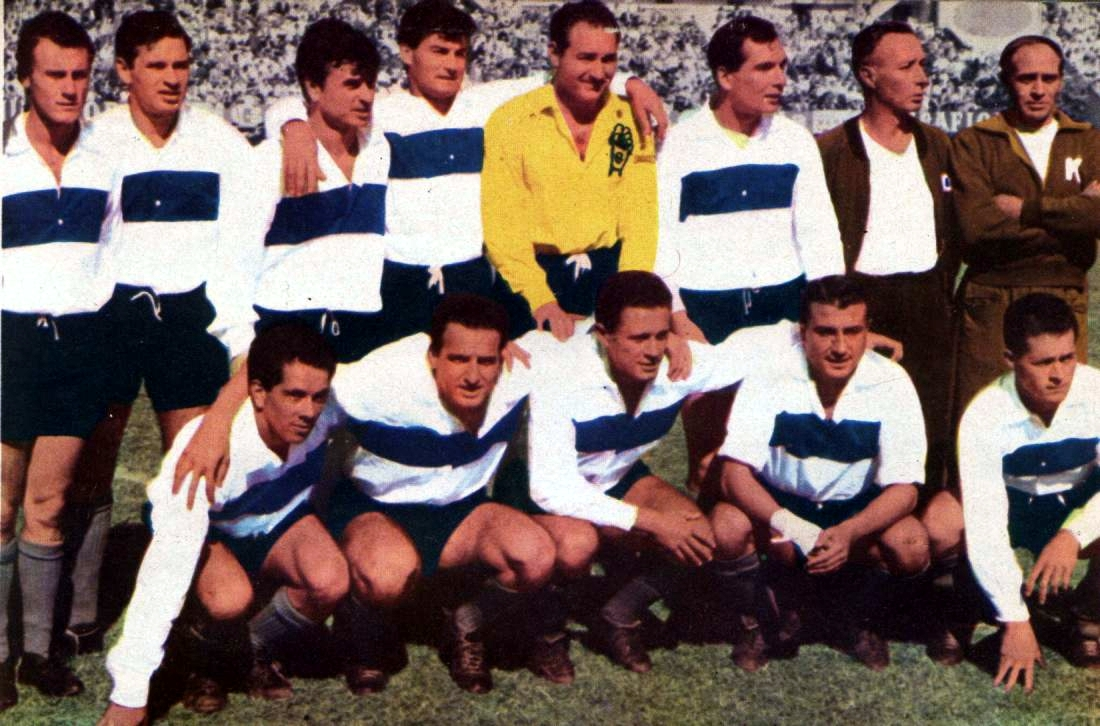
The team of 1960.

In 1960 Gimnasia y Esgrima contested the "Copa Gobernador de la Provincia de Buenos Aires Dr. Oscar Alende", a friendly competition organized by arch-rival Estudiantes. Cups' name honored Governor of Buenos Aires Province, Oscar Alende. Apart from both teams from La Plata, the cup was contested by Uruguayan Peñarol and Nacional.

Gimnasia won both matches against the Uruguayan teams: 5–2 to Nacional and 1–0 to Peñarol, while Estudiantes lost its respective games for 0–1 and 2–5.

In the last fixture Gimnasia faced Estudiantes, with the match finished 2–2. This way on February 13 of 1960 Gimnasia were crowned champion of the Gobernador Alende Cup, in the stadium of its classic rival located on 57 and 1 streets.

=== The Wolf of 1962 ===
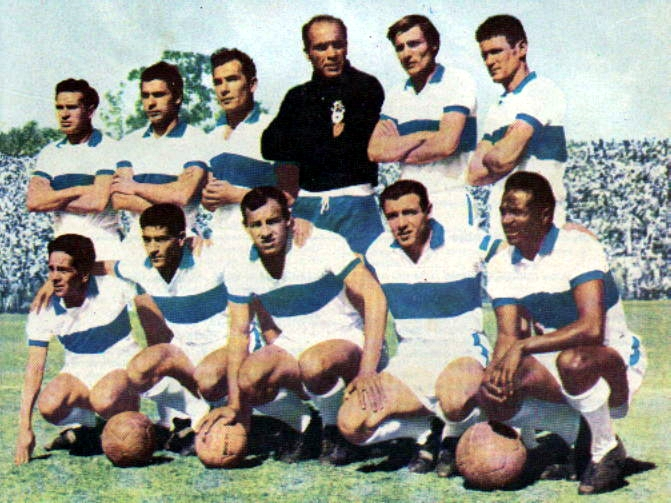
The team of 1962.

In 1962, Gimnasia finished third in the Primera División tournament with 16 wins, 6 draws and 6 defeats. This was a good campaign team platense that after a patchy start, managed to remain unbeaten for 15 dates (between the 9th day of the first round and 10th in the second round) with 9 consecutive wins (including the 15th day of the first and the 9th round of the second), to lead the championship dates to before its completion.

The team was led by Uruguayan Enrique Fernández Viola until the match with Estudiantes, who lost by 0:1 in a local, so he left his charge. Eliseo Prado assumed the interim leadership until Adolfo Pedernera took over the team. Pedernera lasted in charge until three dates before the end of the tournament and the post was occupied by an interim Infante.

The scorer of the team was Alfredo "Tanque" Rojas with 17 goals, followed by Bayo Diego with 10 goals. Gimnasia managed to score 47 goals, and received 28 goals, leaving a positive balance of 19 goals.

The starting eleven for the team were: Carlos Minoian; Pedro Galeano and José Marinovich; Walter Davoine, Daniel Carlos Bayo and Domingo Lejona; Luis Ciaccia, Héctor Antonio or Eliseo Prado, Alfredo "Tanque" Rojas, Diego Francisco Bayo and "Huaqui" Gómez Sánchez. Also played in the first team: Francisco Gerónimo (goalkeeper), Antonio López, Héctor Trinidad, José Perillo, Natalio Sivo, Jorge Mallo, Antonio Arena and Hugo Carro.

=== 1963-1969 ===
In 1963, Gimnasia finished the championship in 13th position, at just three points from the last position. The highlight of that season was the victory of the derby by 5:2, with goals from Ciaccia, Gómez Sánchez, Diego Bayo and 2 from "Tanque" Rojas. The following year Gimnasia ended in the same position.

In 1965, Gimnasia finished the penultimate Leaderboard, above Chacarita Juniors by just one point. In 1966, Gimnasia improved its performance and finished the championship in 8th position with 13 wins, 13 draws and 12 losses.

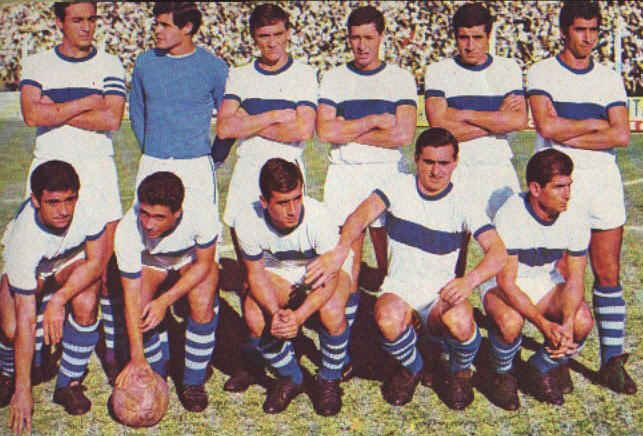
The team of 1967.

After almost a decade alternating good and bad performances, there were realized restructurations in the accomplishment of the championships organized by the Asociación del Fútbol Argentino (AFA). These were the "Metropolitano", with the teams affiliated directly to the AFA divided in two zones, and the "Nacional", in whom some teams affiliated to the AFA were taking part and whom they classified under the first positions of the Metropolitano. The rest of the teams was taking part in the "Promocional" and in the "Reclasificatorio", together with other teams that were representing other leagues of the country.

In the first year, 1967, Gimnasia y Esgrima devoted itself champion of the "Promocional" tournament.

== La Barredora (1970) ==
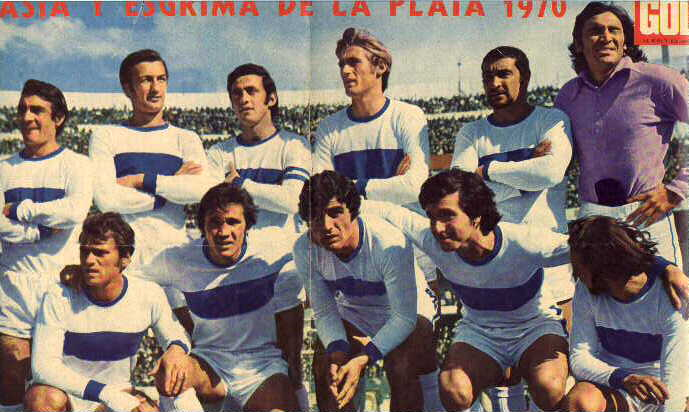
The team of 1970.

One of the teams most remembered by the group of football fans is "La Barredora".

In 1970, Gimnasia y Esgrima managed to qualify to dispute the semi-final of the "Campeonato Nacional" against Rosario Central, who had occupied the first position of the zone "A". Gimnasia y Esgrima for its part had classified second in the zone "B", behind Chacarita Juniors. At the same time happened a conflict between the football players and the leaders of the club for economic motives, which led the President Oscar Venturino to presenting the third division. The final result was 3:0 for the team rosarino.

The team was shaped for: Hugo Orlando Gatti; Ricardo Rezza, José Bernabé Leonardi, José Masnik, Roberto Zywica, Roberto Gonzalo; Héctor Pignani, José Santiago, Delio Onnis, José Néstor Meija, Jorge Castiglia. José Varacka was the coach.

=== Relegation ===
After a forgetful performance in the Campeonato Metropolitano, the wolf must play the quadrangular to determine three decreases of that year against Platense, Chacarita Juniors and Atlanta. With 3 won games, 1 drawn and 2 lost, 7 goals to favor and 8 in against, Gimnasia descends to the Second category.

In that tournament Carlos Dantón Seppaquercia scored the fastest goal into the Argentine league of football. Against Club Atlético Huracán after 5 seconds on March 18, 1979.

The base team was: Vidallé; Magallán, Pellegrini, Sergio Castro and Alí; Tutino, Avelino Verón and García Amaijenda; Cerqueiro, Montagnoli and Forgués. DT: Antonio Ubaldo Rattín. Also played: Carlos Dantón Seppaquercia, Oscar Perez, Restelli, Labaroni, Cragno, Villarreal, Gutiérrez, Solari and Esquivel.

== Primera B (1980-1984) ==
Gimnasia remained in the Primera "B" from 1980 up to 1984. The first year obtained the fourth place in the table of positions after obtained 19 victories, 8 ties and losing the remaining 11 games. The team was directed by Roberto Iturrieta during the first dates and then his position was occupied by Jose Santiango.

In 1981 it obtained the seventh place with 14 victories, 17 ties and 11 defeats, what it left the team without possibilities of achieving the ascent. In this tournament the scorer of the team was Jorge "Potro" Domínguez with 17 goals.

In 1982 it worked out first from the group A with 17 victories, 15 ties and 10 defeats. This way it classified to play the octagonal for the ascent, but it was eliminated after losing by penalties in the semi-final against Temperley. Gimnasia was the most scorer team of the tournament with 73 goals, and its main scorer was again Jorge "Potro" Domínguez with 21 goals.

And in 1983, Gimnasia had a very weak campaign that positioned it in the last position with 8 victories, 15 ties and 19 defeats.

== Return to Primera División ==
In 1984, Gimnasia achieve the longed return to the First Division after obtaining the third place in the table of positions with 18 victories, 10 ties and 14 defeats, qualifying this way to dispute the Octagonal for the second ascent to First "A". In the octagonal formed part Racing Club, Argentino de Rosario, Club Atlético Tigre, Defensores de Belgrano, Club Atlético Lanús, Nueva Chicago and Deportivo Morón.

Gimnasia eliminated of the octagonal in quarters of final Argentino de Rosario after tying 1:1 as visit, and to win 2:1 at home. Then, in the semi-final it faced Defensores de Belgrano achieving a tie 2:2 as visitor and a victory 1:0 at home. By this way, it reached the final instance where it managed to conquer in two opportunities Racing Club (3:1 as visitor and 4:2 at home). After these victories, Gimnasia returned to First Division in 1985 and has been playing there ever since.

The team was conformed by football players as Ricardo "el pulpo" Kuzemka, Carlos Carrió and Osvaldo Ingrao, whereas its trainer was Nito Veiga. The scorers of the team were Carlos Carrió and Osvaldo Ingrao with 12 goals each one and Gabriel Pedrazzi with 10 goals.

== Copa Conmebol 1992 ==
In 1992, Gimnasia y Esgrima La Plata qualified for the first time to an international cup, as it was the Conmebol, organized by the Confederación Sudamericana de Fútbol.

In the first phase traveled to Chile to face O'Higgins which tied 0–0, then in the rematch in the city of La Plata, Gimnasia won by 2-0 and classified for the quarterfinals; and in this instance had to deal with Peñarol of Uruguay, which tied with 0-0 as a visitor and a 3–1 victory in the stadium of the forest.

In the semifinal he had to dispute the classification to the final against Club Olimpia of Paraguay. Both matches (home and away) finished tied at zero and the classification was decided by a penalty kicks. The Paraguayan team made the difference in the penalty kicks and classified to the final with a score 0–3, leaving out the "platense" team.

== Another title after 65 years ==
The AFA organized in 1993 a cup-style (elimination) tournament named "Copa Centenario de la AFA" (AFA Centennial Cup), to celebrate its hundredth anniversary. Each first division team played its derby rival in two rounds in a double elimination system. Gimnasia y Esgrima eliminated its classic rival Estudiantes 1–0 with a goal by Guillermo Barros Schelotto, and qualified for the next round after a 0–0 tie in the return match. Then, Gimnasia successively eliminated Newell's Old Boys, Argentinos Juniors and Belgrano de Córdoba to win the "round of winners".

River Plate won the "round of losers" and qualified for the final, with Gimnasia having home court advantage.

Gimnasia won the final 3–1 with goals by Hugo Guerra, Pablo Fernández and Guillermo Barros Schelotto. River's goal was scored by Facundo Villalba. Gimnasia's line-up was Lavallén; Sanguinetti, Morant, Ortiz, Dopazo; P. Fernández, Bianco, Talarico, Gustavo Barros Schelotto; Guillermo Barros Schelotto, Guerra.

== Sanwa Bank Cup (1994) ==
In 1994, Gimnasia traveled to Japan to play the Sanwa Bank Cup, which was invited by the J-League to be the champion of the Centennial of the AFA Cup. The cup will be played in one game and had to play against the champion of the J-League, the Verdy Kawasaki (now known as Tokyo Verdy).

The match was played in the National Stadium in Shinjuku, Tokyo, and ended regular time with a 2–2 tie, and was decided with penalties, where Verdy Kawasaki won 4–2.

== From Griguol to Troglio (1994-2006) ==
With veteran coach Carlos Timoteo Griguol at the helm, Gimnasia took second place in the 1995 Clausura tournament, repeating the performance in 1996 and 1998. At the reinauguration of Boca Juniors' stadium (La Bombonera) on May 5, 1996, Gimnasia defeated the home team by 6–0. Also took second place in 2002 (coached by Ramaciotti).

Gimnasia also obtained second place in 2005 under Pedro Troglio's management, after an excellent campaign that had them fighting neck to neck with Boca Juniors until the very end of the championship. These strong showings allowed Gimnasia to take part in the top club-level competitions in South America: the Copa Sudamericana during the 2006 and 2007 editions of the Copa Libertadores.

== 2006–07 crisis ==
On September 10, 2006, during the halftime of a match against Boca Juniors, club president Juan José Muñoz confronted (and allegedly threatened) referee Daniel Giménez, who called off the match immediately, with Gimnasia leading 1–0. Muñoz was suspended for six months by the football association but was confirmed in his post by the club's board.

On October 15, 2006, Gimnasia suffered their worst derby defeat ever, a 7-0 Estudiantes victory. It was the first derby played in the new La Plata city stadium with Estudiantes as home team. A few days later, Gimnasia was eliminated from the Copa Sudamericana by the Chilean Colo Colo, in a match so marred by Gimnasia's violence that Argentine Football Association's president Julio Grondona wrote a letter of apology to the president of the ANFP (the Chilean football federation).

The pending second half against Boca Juniors was played on 8 November 2006. Boca Juniors scored four goals and won the match. After the match, Troglio and some of the players hinted that the team had received death threats from a fraction of their own supporters, who wanted to benefit Boca in its championship bid against Gimnasia's archrivals Estudiantes. Nevertheless, Estudiantes obtained the title in the end.

La Plata District Attorney Marcelo Romero opened a criminal case and cited some club players and officers to testify. Player Marcelo Goux refused to play the next match and quit the team; he was soon followed by fellow players Martín Cardetti and Ariel Franco. Many articles condemned Muñoz's handling of the situation, accusing him of lying to the press, and of treating violent fans as his protégés.

After a string of losses in the local championship and the Copa Libertadores, there were renewed calls for Muñoz to resign. Coach Troglio felt the burden of responsibility and quit his post on April 2, 2007. Gimnasia hired first famed Colombian trainer Francisco Maturana, and then Julio César Falcioni, both with limited success.

== 2007–08: New management ==
In the December 2007 election, Muñoz did not run, and the candidate he supported lost to the opposition. New club president Walter Gisande hired former player Guillermo Sanguinetti as team coach and tried to convince former players, notably Diego Alonso and Guillermo Barros Schelotto, to return to Gimnasia. Only Alonso, who was playing in China, made the leap.

Sanguinetti quit after a string of bad results that left Gimnasia in serious danger of relegation. Under new coach Leonardo Madelón, team results improved markedly, and as of the beginning of the 2009 Clausura tournament, Gimnasia is better positioned to stay in the Primera level.

The new management also campaigned for a return to its traditional ground at El Bosque. Starting April 2008, the stadium underwent a structural engineering evaluation after all security measures requested by authorities were put in place. In June 2008, Gimnasia was allowed to play again at El Bosque; the return took place in a match against Lanús, the last game of the Clausura 2008 championship. Mayor Pablo Bruera has indicated that the city will let Gimnasia buy or lease some city-owned lands for erecting a sports complex.

Gimnasia y Esgrima secured promotion to Primera División in May, 2013, after defeating Instituto de Córdoba by 2–0 with three fixtures remaining for the end of the championship.

== 2013, 2014 and 2015: Renaissance ==
After ascending to the First Division, Gimnasia played the Initial Tournament 2013 in which, together with its coach, Pedro Troglio, managed to stay at the top of the table, highlighting its great 1-0 victory over River Plate at home in the first However, his level dropped during the course of the championship and he finished in 11th position.

In the 2014 Final Tournament, Gimnasia remained in the middle of the table for a large part of the championship, but at the end of this it improved its level considerably, reaching a streak of 6 consecutive victories. Gimnasia finished fifth in that tournament, a position that led to his qualification for the Copa Sudamericana 2014, which was eliminated in the first phase against his classic rival Estudiantes de La Plata.

== 2016, 2017 and 2018: Freefall ==
With Gabriel Pellegrino as club president, Mariano Soso would be chosen as the new coach. His time at the club was very bad and criticized. Facundo Sava would take his place but he would leave shortly after due to the terrible results obtained. Pedro Troglio would return to the Club. His time at the club was not as expected, but he still managed to reach the final of the 2017-18 Copa Argentina where he would lose the final on penalties to Rosario Central. After this, Troglio would resign and Hernán Ortiz would take his place, who would lose the classic to Estudiantes.

== 2019-2020: Diego Maradona ==
Ortiz resigned shortly after. Nothing more and nothing less than Diego Maradona would take his place. Gimnasia was very close to relegation. But the COVID-19 pandemic caused the declines to be suspended. Therefore Gimnasia would be saved. Already in late 2020, Maradona would be found lifeless in his home. Mariano Messera and Leandro Martini would take his place as coach.

== 2021-present: Up hill ==
By 2021, Gimnasia would get good results and it would take him away from relegation a bit. But due to the results obtained in the Professional League Cup 2021, Gimnasia re-entered the hot zone of averages, which were suspended by the AFA, since 2020.

== Records and curiosities ==
- Gimnasia was the first South American team to defeat Real Madrid CF on Spanish soil. The match was played on January 1, 1931 and ended with a score of 3–2 for Gimnasia.
- Gimnasia was the first Argentine club to hire a foreign manager in the professional era, Emérico Hirschl from Hungary.
- Between August 12, 1932 and September 9, 1934 Gimnasia won five consecutive La Plata derbies, the longest run of victories in that derby to date.
- Gimnasia best score ever was an 8–1 victory against Racing Club on November 22, 1961. Curiously, Racing Club was the champion on that year.

== Chronology of the home stadium ==
The club have not always had its own stadium, before 1924 the team played in different courts. Also, at present, due to problems with the Juan Carmelo Zerillo Stadium, the team is forced to play matches of high concurrence at the Ciudad de La Plata Stadium.

Here are the places where locally made (without regard to temporary situations):

- 1901-1905 Plaza de Juegos Atléticos, 1 Avenue & 47 Street, La Plata, Province of Buenos Aires.
- 1905 51 & 20 streets, La Plata, Province of Buenos Aires. (Belgrano's field - played a few matches to complete 1905 season)
- 1906-1911 Practice of football is suspended.
- 1912-1914 Plaza de Juegos Atléticos de los Bomberos, 60 Avenue (near present stadium)
- 1915 Club Independientes field (near present stadium)
- 1916-1923 12 & 71 streets (Meridiano V), La Plata, Province of Buenos Aires.
- 1924-2005 Estadio Juan Carmelo Zerillo (named on December 21, 1974), 60 Avenue & 118 Street, La Plata, Province of Buenos Aires.
- 2005-2008 Estadio Ciudad de La Plata, 32 & 25 streets, La Plata, Province of Buenos Aires.
- 2008–present Estadio Juan Carmelo Zerillo, 60 Avenue & 118 Street, La Plata, Province of Buenos Aires.

The stadium's club remains the Juan Carmelo Zerillo Stadium, which is owned by the club. At present, after the steering committee headed by Gisande arrangements made at the security agency Co.Pro.Se.De enabled the stadium for matches of minor visitor attendance. However, Gimnasia y Esgrima can play home games at the Estadio Ciudad de La Plata if they so decide.
