= 1993 Copa Centenario Final =

1993 Copa Centenario de la AFA Final
- Event: Copa Centenario de la AFA
| Gimnasia y Esgrima LP | River Plate |
| 3 | 1 |
- Date: 30 January 1994
- Venue: Juan C. Zerillo, La Plata
- Referee: Javier Castrilli
- Attendance: 25,000

The 1993 Copa Centenario de la AFA Final was a football match played on January 30, 1994, between Gimnasia y Esgrima La Plata and River Plate to determine the Copa Centenario de la AFA champion.

The match was played at Gimnasia y Esgrima's venue, Estadio Juan Carmelo Zerillo in La Plata. Gimnasia y Esgrima was managed by Roberto Perfumo after the coach team composed by Carlos Ramaciotti and Edgardo Sbrissa resigned after five rounds played.

Gimnasia y Esgrima reached the final after eliminating arch-rival Estudiantes de La Plata, Newell's Old Boys, Argentinos Juniors and Belgrano de Córdoba.

The Copa Centenario was the second title achieved by Gimnasia y Esgrima, the first after the Primera División championship won in 1929. Guillermo Barros Schelotto was the topscorer with 2 goals.

== Match details ==
1993 Copa Centenario de la AFA Final
30 January 1994
Rinal

| Gimnasia y Esgrima (LP) | 3–1 | River Plate |
|---|---|---|
| Guerra 44'; P. Fernández 76'; Guillermo B.S. 89' | Report | Villalba 49' |

Juan C. Zerillo, La Plata
Attendance: 25,000
Referee: Javier Castrilli

| Gimnasia y Esgrima LP | River Plate |

| GK | 1 | (Argentina) Javier Lavallén |
| DF | 4 | (Uruguay) Guillermo Sanguinetti |
| DF | 2 | (Argentina) Pablo Morant |
| DF | 6 | (Argentina) Hernán Ortiz |
| DF | 3 | (Argentina) Sergio Dopazo |
| MF | 8 | (Argentina) Pablo Fernández |
| MF | 5 | (Argentina) José María Bianco |
| MF | 7 | (Argentina) Pablo Tallarico |
| MF | 10 | (Argentina) Gustavo B. Schelotto |
| FW | 9 | (Uruguay) Hugo Guerra |
| FW | 11 | (Argentina) Guillermo B. Schelotto |
Manager:
(Argentina) Roberto Perfumo

| GK | 1 | (Argentina) Sergio Goycochea |
| DF | 4 | (Argentina) Hernán Díaz |
| DF | 2 | (Argentina) Guillermo Rivarola |
| DF | 6 | (Argentina) Ernesto Corti |
| DF | 3 | (Argentina) Pablo Lavallén |
| MF | 8 | (Argentina) Julio Toresani |
| MF | 5 | (Argentina) Leonardo Astrada |
| MF | 9 | (Argentina) Sergio Berti |
| MF | 10 | (Argentina) Ariel Ortega |
| FW | 7 | (Argentina) Facundo Villalba |
| FW | 11 | (Argentina) Walter Silvani |
Manager:
(Argentina) Daniel Passarella
