= List of presidents of Club de Gimnasia y Esgrima La Plata =

Throughout its more than 120 years of history, the Club de Gimnasia y Esgrima La Plata has had 55 presidents who took on the responsibility of steering the institution. Many of them contributed to the growth of the Club over the years.

The president who had the longest term was Oscar Emir Venturino, who served for 11 years. Héctor Atilio Delmar was the only president to serve three terms: 1983–1989, 1992–1998, and 2010–2012. Miguel Gutiérrez and Edelmiro Palacios had two terms each.

The current president of Gimnasia y Esgrima La Plata is Gabriel Pellegrino. On 15 December 2019, after declining to seek re-election, Pellegrino was re-elected to a three-year term

== First president ==
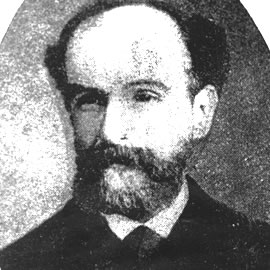
Saturnino Perdriel 1887.

Saturnino Perdriel was the founder and first president of Gimnasia y Esgrima La Plata. Perdriel was an outstanding neighbour and merchant during the first few years of the city of La Plata, in addition to being a civil servant at the Treasury Department of the Province of Buenos Aires. He died prematurely in 1888, after one year as club president. Following his death the vice-president of the club Domingo Etcheverry became the club president

== Electoral system ==
Nowadays, the president of Club de Gimnasia y Esgrima La Plata is chosen by its associates, by means of general elections that take place every three years. Any club member over 18 years of age, and with at least three years seniority in the club, have a right to vote. Members with over seven years seniority have a right to be elected to the club governmental body, the Management Commission or "Directory".

== List of presidents ==
Below are listed all the presidents elected since the foundation of the Club de Gimnasia y Esgrima La Plata:

Order	Image	President	Beginning	End	Notes
1st		Saturnino Perdriel	1887	1888	First President. He died in 1888. The charge relied on to vice-president Etcheverry, until by the new assembly was elected president of the club, José Antonio Lagos.
2nd		Domingo Etcheverry		3 April 1888	
3rd		José Antonio Lagos	3 April 1888	8 February 1889	
4th		Osvaldo Botet	9 February 1889	15 December 1889	During its presidency, the Corporate Headquarters of the intersection of 5 and 54 street, was moved to 53 Avenue between 4 and 5 streets of the city.
5th		Dr. Adolfo Montier	1889	1891	
6th		Dr. Ricardo C. Aldao	1891	1891	
7th		Dr. Alejandro Korn	1891	1894	
8th		Dr. Mariano Paunero	1894	1896	
9th		Dr. Teodoro Granel	1896	1896	
10th		Norberto Casco	1896	1897	
11th		Cap. Miguel Gutiérrez	1897	1897	
12th		Dr. Julio Julianez Islas	1897	1898	
13th		Juan M. González	1898	1900	
14th		Dr. Edelmiro Palacios	1900	1903	
15th		Cap. Miguel Gutiérrez	1903	1904	
16th		Dr. César Ameghino	1904	1905	
17th		Ricardo Guido Lavalle	1905	1906	
18th		Ing. Benjamín Sal	1906	1907	
19th		Dr. Horacio J. Araúz	1907	1909	
20th		Diego Arana	1909	1910	
21st		Dr. Edelmiro Palacios	1910	1913	
22nd		Julio J. Paz	1913	1913	
23rd		Dr. Emiliano de La Puente	1913	1913	
24th		Juan José Atenció	1913	1913	Elected but he resigned before assuming the presidency.
25th		Dr. Emiliano de La Puente	1913	1914	
26th		Telésforo B. Ubios	1914	1914	
27th		Dr. Emiliano de La Puente	1914	1915	
28th		Jacinto Augusto Castellanos	1915	1915	Elected but he resigned before assuming the presidency.
29th		Dr. Emiliano de La Puente	1915	1917	
30th		Guillermo O'Reilly	1917	1919	
31st		Dr. Alejandro Oyuela	1919	1920	
32nd		Dr. Horacio Casco	1920	1925	
33rd		Dr. Augusto Lidiedal	1925	1927	
34th		Dr. Alberto González	1927	1928	
35th		Dr. Adolfo Rivarola	1928	1929	
36th		Juan Carmelo Zerillo	1929	1931	Torneo Argentino Amateur Champion in 1929.
37th		Juan T. Erbiti	1931	1932	
38th		Ing. Juan Ángel Marmonti	1932	1932	
39th		Dr. Plácido Seara	1932	1934	
40th		Juan T. Erbiti	1934	1936	
41st		Osvaldo Cortelezzi	1936	1937	
42nd		José Julián Saiñas	1937	1938	
43rd		Ing. José Montalvo	1938	1942	
44th		Dr. Carlos C. Tejo	1942	1945	
45th		Dr. Plácido Seara	1945	1945	
46th		Cap. Horacio Barandiarán	1945	1947	
47th		Dr. Gabriel Rodríguez	1947	1948	
48th		Dr. Carlos Insúa	1948	1955	
49th		Genaro Rucci	1955	1957	
50th		Dr. Laureano Durán	1957	1967	
51st		Dr. Pedro Osvaldo Enrique Soria	1967	1968	On 13 December 1967 assumes the presidency, but because of his differences with the Board his resignation to it, assuming Venturino 2 April 1968.
52nd		Oscar Emir Venturino	1968	1979	
53rd		Cdr. Jorge Tittarelli	1979	1980	
54th		Tomás Sessa	1980	1980	
55th		Norberto Coco Sánchez	1980	1983	
56th		Alejandro Breccia	1983	1983	
57th		Mario Milazzo	1983	1983	
58th		Dr. Hugo Barros Schelotto	1983	1983	
59th		Héctor Atilio Delmar	1983	1989	In 1984, with Delmar, Gimnasia was promoted to Primera división.
60th		Cdr. Roberto Vicente	1989	1992	
61st		Héctor Atilio Delmar	1992	1998	In 1992 Gimnasia qualified to Copa Conmebol; in 1993 it won the Copa Centenario; and in 1995, 1996 y 1998 was Primera División runner-up.
62nd		Cdr. Héctor Domínguez	1998	2004	Domínguez won the 28 November 1998 with 1847 votes (49.89 percent) against 1450 of Delmar (the 39.16 percent) and 405 votes (the 10.94 percent) of Marcelo Ferrari.
63rd		Ing. Francisco Gliemmo	2004	2004	
64th		Juan José Muñoz	2004	2007	
65th		Hugo Capdebarthe	2007	1 December 2007	
66th		Walter Gisande	1 December 2007		
59th		Héctor Atilio Delmar	December 2010	July 2012	
60th		Daniel Onofri	July 2012		(acting, following Delmar's resignation)

== Largest periods ==
President	Years
Oscar Emir Venturino	11
Laureano Durán	10
Carlos Insúa	7

== See also ==
- Club de Gimnasia y Esgrima La Plata
- History of Club de Gimnasia y Esgrima La Plata
