= Altos Hornos Zapla =

Argentine football club

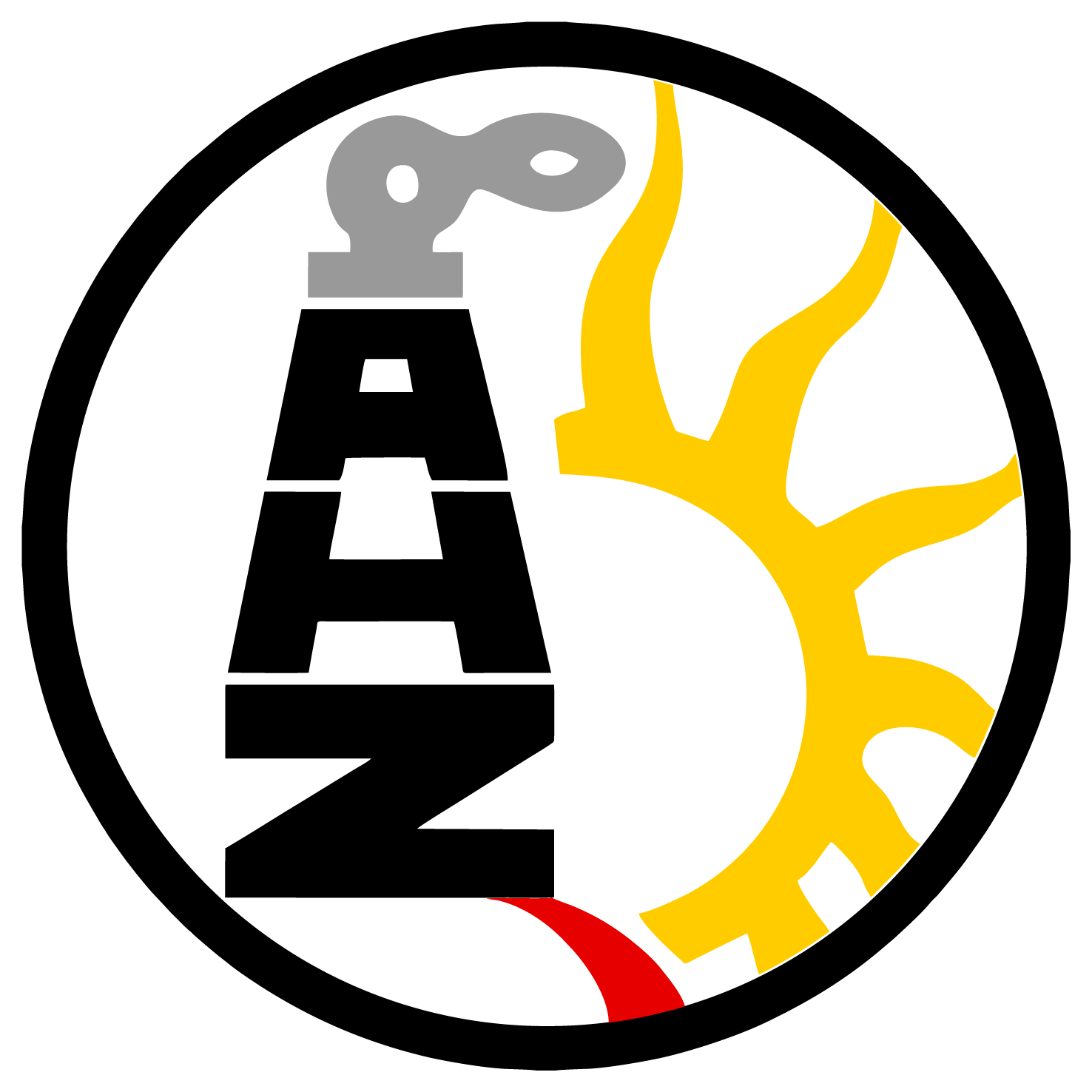
- Full name: Asociación Cultural y Deportiva Altos Hornos Zapla
- Nickname(s): Merengues
- Founded: 4 January 1947; 78 years ago
- Ground: Estadio Emilio Fabrizzi, Palpalá, Jujuy Province, Argentina
- Capacity: 20,000
- Chairman: Marcelo Lizarraga
- Manager: Héctor Daniel López
- League: Torneo Regional Federal
Home colours	Away colours

Asociación Cultural y Deportiva Altos Hornos Zapla is an Argentine football club from Palpalá, in the Jujuy Province of Argentina. The team currently plays in the regionalised 4th level of Argentinian football, the Torneo Argentino B.

== Primera Division Argentina ==
The club has played at the highest level of Argentine football on six occasions, when it qualified to play in the National tournaments of 1974, 1978, 1979, 1983, 1984 and 1985, but Altos Hornos never made it past the first group stage. Some of the highlights of its time in the top flight include 3 wins over Gimnasia y Esgrima (LP) in 1974 and 1978, a win over Newell's Old Boys and Colón de Santa Fe (both in 1974), another victory over Argentinos Juniors in 1979 and a 1–0 victory over Boca Juniors in 1985, being coached by Juan Carlos Murúa.

== Titles ==
- La Liga Jujeña: 15

== See also ==
- List of football clubs in Argentina
- Argentine football league system
