= Ariel Pereyra =

Ariel Pereyra may refer to:

- Ariel Pereyra (defender) (born 1973), Argentine football centre-back
- Ariel Pereyra (forward) (born 1973), Argentine football manager and former striker
