= Bullrich =

Bullrich is a surname. Notable people with the surname include:

- Adolfo Bullrich (1833–1904), Argentine politician and entrepreneur
- Esteban Bullrich (born 1969), Argentine politician
- Patricia Bullrich (born 1956), Argentine politician
- Silvina Bullrich (1915–1990), Argentine novelist, translator, screenwriter, critic, and academic
