= Jorge San Esteban =

Argentine footballer

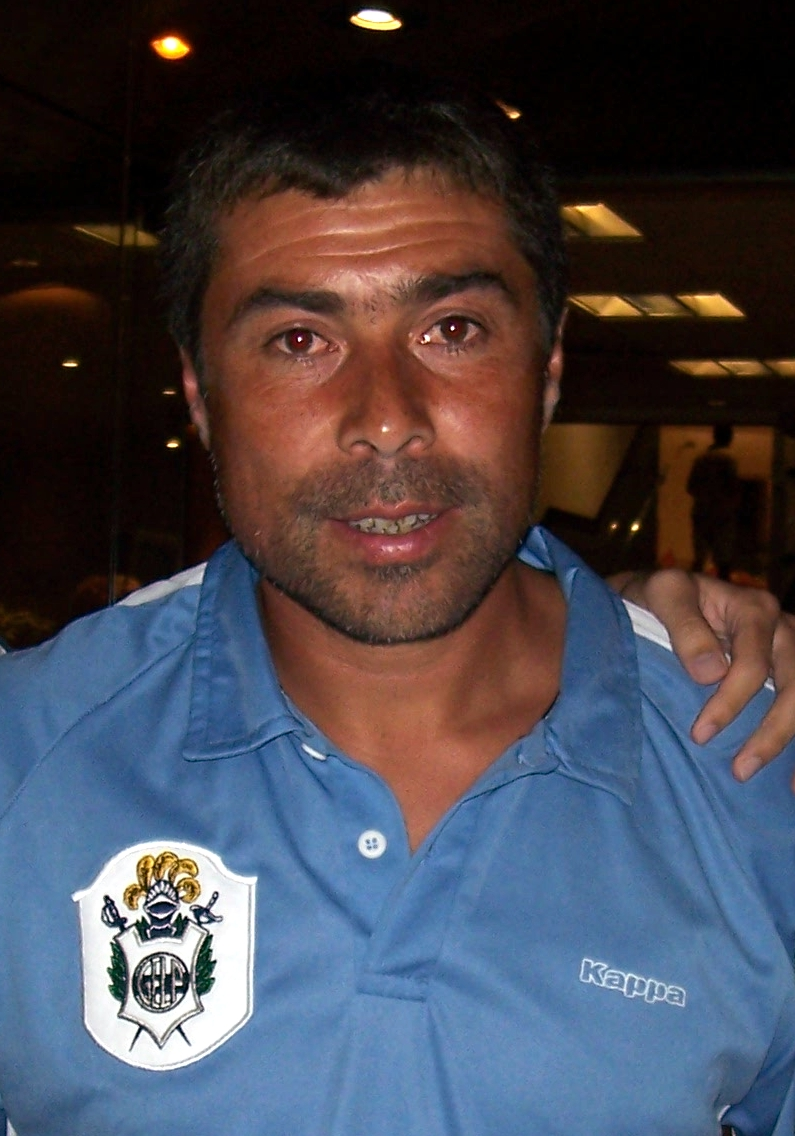

Personal information
- Full name: Jorge Héctor San Esteban
- Date of birth: June 28, 1972 (age 54)
- Place of birth: La Plata, Argentina
- Height: 1.77 m (5 ft 10 in)
- Position: Centre back

Senior career*
Years	Team	Apps	(Gls)
1992–2003	Gimnasia LP	306	(26)
2003–2004	Nueva Chicago	32	(2)
2004–2009	Gimnasia LP	128	(2)
2009–2012	Villa San Carlos		

International career
1999	Argentina	1	(0)

Managerial career
- 2013–2014: Villa San Carlos
- * Club domestic league appearances and goals

Jorge San Esteban (born 28 June 1972 in La Plata) is a former Argentine football defender.

== Club career ==
San Esteban began his professional playing career in 1992 with Club de Gimnasia y Esgrima La Plata, he made his league debut on 23 February 1992 in a 2–1 away defeat against Deportivo Español. He went on to make over 300 appearances for the club during his first spell. He joined Nueva Chicago for the 2003–04 season but returned to Gimnasia for a second spell between 2004 and 2009.

In the 2006–07 season, San Esteban was criticized by the press as Gimnasia went through a string of defeats to local teams (7–0 to Estudiantes de La Plata, 5–1 to Boca Juniors) and in international competition (three goals or more per match against Colo Colo, Defensor Sporting Club, and Santos).

In the 2009 winter transfer window he joined Villa San Carlos of Primera B Metropolitana.

== International career ==
He played for the Argentina national football team in a friendly against Mexico in 1999.
