= Juan Carlos Murúa =

Argentine footballer (1935–2023)

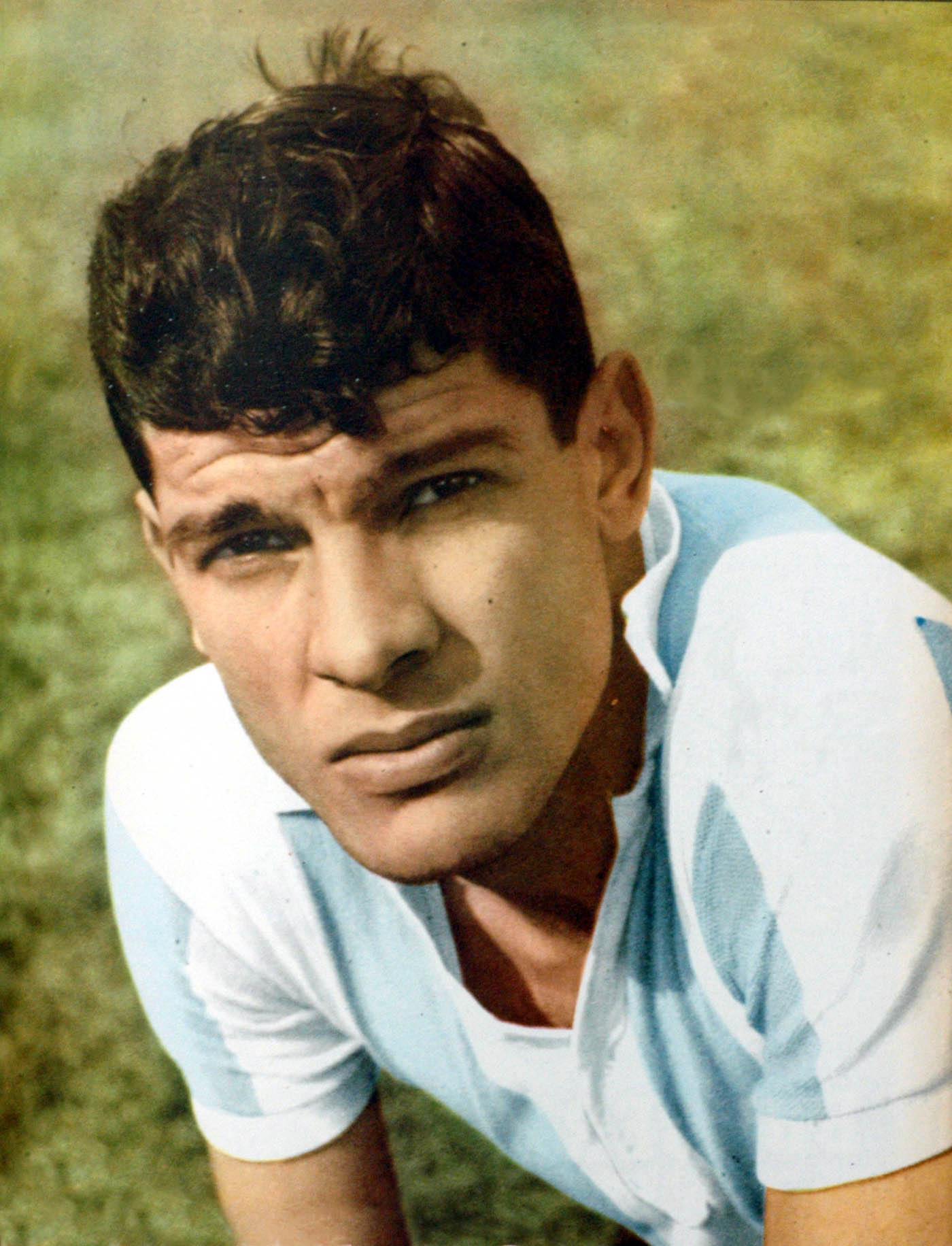
- Murúa at Racing Club

Personal information
- Date of birth: 17 July 1935
- Place of birth: Misiones Province, Argentina
- Date of death: 26 March 2023 (aged 87)
- Position: Defender

Senior career*
Years	Team	Apps	(Gls)
1956–?	Racing Club	114	(0)
	Argentinos Juniors	3	(0)
–1968	Platense	122	(1)

International career
–1959–	Argentina		

Managerial career
- 1968–1969: Gimnasia La Plata
- 1970: Talleres (RE)
- 1971: Gimnasia La Plata
- Platense
- Los Andes
- Huracán Las Heras
- 1983–1985: Independiente Rivadavia
- Altos Hornos Zapla
- * Club domestic league appearances and goals

Juan Carlos Murúa (17 July 1935 – 26 March 2023) was an Argentine football player and manager who played in the Copa América 1959.

Murúa was primarily associated with the Greater Buenos Aires team Racing Club de Avellaneda, where he was part of the championship-winning team of 1958. He went on to play for Argentinos Juniors and Platense.

== Coaching career ==
After retiring as a player Murúa took up coaching, he had spells in charge of several Buenos Aires based teams, such as Gimnasia La Plata, Platense and Talleres de Remedios de Escalada where he led the team to a third tier championship and gave José Yudica his first break in management.

Later in his career, he coached several teams in the interior including Altos Hornos Zapla during the 1983 and 1985 Nacional championships.

Following his professional career, Murúa has remained one of the best-remembered stars of his era, with his 1958 image appearing, for example, on a 2005 El Grafico trading card, and was a representative of Argentine soccer at national events. As of 2007, he was affiliated with the college team U. Veronés.
