= Copa Bullrich =

- Organising body: AFA
- Founded: 1903
- Abolished: 1934; 91 years ago
- Region: Argentina
- Most successful club(s): Independiente; Ferro Carril Oeste; Boca Juniors; Central Argentino (2 titles each)

The Copa de Competencia Adolfo Bullrich, or simply Copa Bullrich, was an official football tournament held from 1903 to 1934 in Argentina. From 1905 to 1915 the championship was contested by clubs playing in the second division of Argentine league system, that were Segunda División (1903-1910) and División Intermedia (1911-1915).

== Overview ==
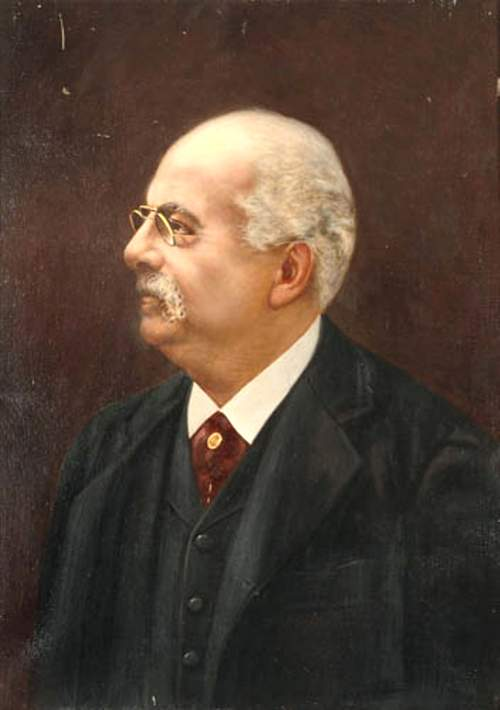
Adolfo Bullrich donated the trophy

The trophy was donated by former mayor of Buenos Aires, Adolfo Bullrich, and named after him. It was contested by teams playing in the second division of Argentine football (Primera B Metropolitana, 1903–10, and División Intermedia, 1911–15). During the first years of existence, Copa Bullrich was contested by senior teams, except in cases where the participating clubs were already playing in Primera División so they registered reserve or youth teams to play the competition.

From 1916, the tournament was renamed "Copa Competencia de División Intermedia", while it progressively lost interest. The last edition was held in 1934 as "Copa Competencia de Segunda División", after several years without being organised.

The Copa Bullrich was relevant for having been the first official title won by several clubs, such as Independiente (1909) or Gimnasia y Esgrima (LP) in 1915.

Clubs that had won the cup playing at second division and were playing in Primera División sent youth or reserve teams to play the tournament, as Belgrano Athletic did in 1905 or Boca Juniors in 1934, among other cases.

== List of champions ==
=== Second level ===
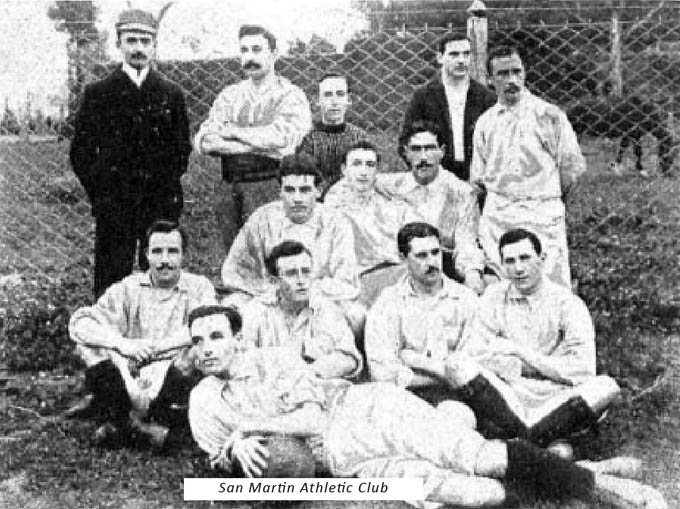
San Martín A.C., first winner of Copa Bullrich in 1903

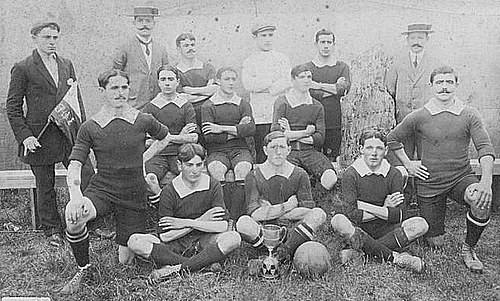
Independiente team that won the 1909 title

Ed.	Year	Winner
1	1903	San Martín A.C.
2	1904	Barracas A.C. (Note: Reserve team so the senior squad was playing in Primera División.)
3	1905	Belgrano A.C.
4	1906	Porteño
5	1907	Gimnasia y Esgrima (BA)
6	1908	Atlanta
7	1909	Independiente
8	1910	Racing
9	1911	Nacional (Floresta)
10	1912	Ferro Carril Oeste
11	1913	Ferro Carril Oeste
12	1915	Gimnasia y Esgrima (LP)
13	1916	Liberal Argentino
14	1917	Independiente
15	1918	Boca Juniors
16	1919	Estudiantes (LP)
17	1920	Alvear
18	1922	Central Argentino
19	1923	Central Argentino
20	1926	Unión (Caseros)
21	1934	Boca Juniors

=== Third level ===
Ed.	Year	Winner
1	1927	Acassuso
2	1929	La Paternal

== Titles by club ==
Team	Titles	Years won
Independiente	2	1909, 1917
Ferro Carril Oeste	2	1912, 1913
Boca Juniors	2	1918, 1934
Central Argentino	2	1922, 1923
San Martín Athletic	1	1903
Barracas A.C.	1	1904
Belgrano A.C.	1	1905
Porteño	1	1906
Gimnasia y Esgrima (BA)	1	1907
Atlanta	1	1908
Racing	1	1910
Nacional (Floresta)	1	1911
Gimnasia y Esgrima (LP)	1	1915
Liberal Argentino	1	1916
Estudiantes (LP)	1	1919
Alvear	1	1920
Unión (Caseros)	1	1926

== See also ==
- Primera B Metropolitana
- Argentine División Intermedia
- Adolfo Bullrich
