= Palpalá =

Coordinates: 24°15′S 65°07′W

- Interactive map of Palpalá
- Country: Argentina
- Province: Jujuy

Population (2010 census)
  - Total: 50,183
- Time zone: UTC−3 (ART)

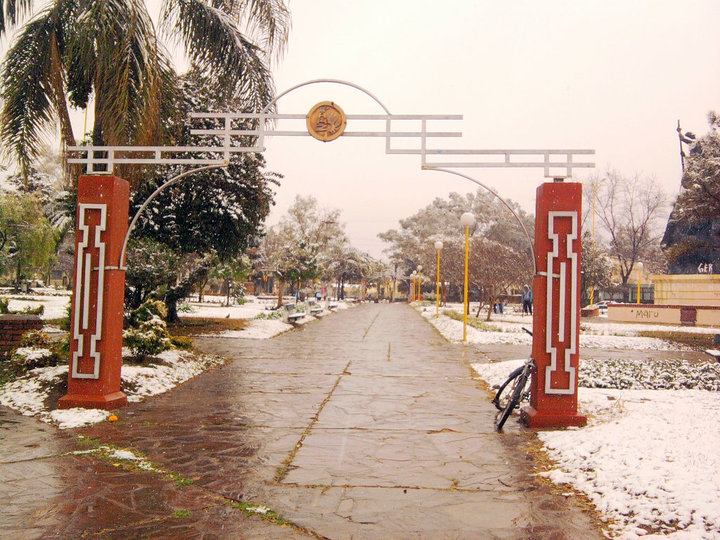

Palpalá is a municipality in Jujuy Province in Argentina.

The football team Altos Hornos Zapla are from Palpalá.
