= Leandro Martini =

Argentine football manager

Personal information
- Full name: Leandro Damián Martini
- Date of birth: 19 February 1974 (age 52)
- Place of birth: La Plata, Argentina
- Height: 1.81 m (5 ft 11 in)
- Position: Midfielder

Youth career
- Villa San Carlos

Senior career*
| Years | Team | Apps | (Gls) |
| 1991–1998 | Villa San Carlos | | |
| 1998 | Sacachispas | 9 | (4) |
| 1999 | San Martín Burzaco | 18 | (3) |
| 1999–2010 | Villa San Carlos | 229 | (29) |

Managerial career
- 2013–2020: Gimnasia La Plata (youth)
- 2017: Gimnasia La Plata (interim)
- 2020–2021: Gimnasia La Plata
- 2023: Villa San Carlos
- * Club domestic league appearances and goals

Leandro Damián Martini (born 19 February 1974) is an Argentine football manager and former player who played as a midfielder.

Martini is the top goalscorer of Villa San Carlos' history, with 80 goals in 18 seasons for the club.

== Playing career ==
Born in La Plata, Martini made his senior debut with Villa San Carlos in 1991, aged 17. His career was mainly associated with the club, as he only spent one year away from the club (in the 1998–99 season) where he represented Sacachispas and San Martín de Burzaco.

Martini retired with Villa San Carlos in December 2010, after a combined total of 18 seasons, more than 400 matches and 80 goals while representing the club.

== Managerial career ==
After retiring, Martini started working at Gimnasia La Plata as a youth manager. On 18 May 2017, he and Mariano Messera were named interim managers of the first team for the remainder of the 2016–17 season. The duo returned to their previous roles after the appointment of Mariano Soso.

In November 2020, following the death of manager Diego Maradona and the resignation of his assistant Sebastián Méndez, Martini and Messera were again named interim managers. The following 15 January, the duo were made permanent managers of the main squad.
