= Nelson Insfrán =

Argentine footballer

Personal information
- Full name: Nelson Federico Insfrán
- Date of birth: 24 May 1995 (age 31)
- Place of birth: Clorinda, Argentina
- Height: 1.79 m (5 ft 10 in)
- Position: Goalkeeper

Team information
- Current team: Gimnasia LP
- Number: 23

Youth career
- Gimnasia LP

Senior career*
Years	Team	Apps	(Gls)
2019–	Gimnasia LP	76	(0)
2022	→ Central Córdoba SdE (loan)	0	(0)
2022	→ San Martín T. (loan)	0	(0)
- * Club domestic league appearances and goals as of 17:23, 9 July 2026 (UTC)

Nelson Federico Insfrán (born 24 May 1995) is an Argentine professional footballer who plays as a goalkeeper for Gimnasia y Esgrima.

== Club career ==
Insfrán made his professional debut with Gimnasia y Esgrima in a 1-1 Argentine Primera División tie with Banfield on 29 November 2019. Insfrán received a yellow card for timewasting, and a red card for a penalty given without contact; the cards were overturned by tribunal in December 2019.

In January 2022, Insfrán joined Central Córdoba SdE on a one-year loan. However, the spell was terminated on 3 August 2022 and Insfrán was instead loaned out to Primera Nacional side San Martín de Tucumán until the end of 2022.
