= Juan José Muñoz =

Juan José Muñoz (3 June 1950 – 8 May 2013) was an Argentine businessman. He was an advisor to the current Minister of Interior, Mr. Aníbal Fernández, during the period when the latter was a federal senator. Afterwards, he worked for the trade union that represents State Workers (the “Asociación Mutual de Trabajadores del Estado”, or AMTE).

Muñoz was born in La Plata, Argentina. He was a self-made man, who rose from humble beginnings to become the owner of various agencies specializing in finances, tourism, and insurance, as well as a building company and a hotel chain. In November 2004, he was elected President of the football club Gimnasia y Esgrima La Plata, the oldest club currently affiliated to the Argentine Football Association (AFA). He occupied this position until the end of 2007, when a new management committee was chosen.

== Club management at Gimnasia y Esgrima La Plata ==
During his mandate as president, the football club from La Plata, better known by its nickname of "El Lobo" (Spanish for “The Wolf”), exhibited two very contradictory faces.

== Positive aspects ==
At the beginning of Muñoz's tenure, the team was at the edge of relegation to second division. He spearheaded the decision to hire Pedro Troglio as coach, who was instrumental in turning around the performance by mid-2005. During the second half of that year, the team gelled in the Torneo Apertura 2005 and pulled off an excellent campaign which had it fighting neck-to-neck with Boca Juniors for the championship. Finally, Gimnasia crowned the effort by becoming a close runner-up, the fifth time the team obtained such honours in the ten years spanning 1995–2005. In June 2006, Muñoz decided to withdraw the Nº 21 jersey, which was the number used by Pedro Troglio while playing in Gimnasia during the 1990s. This was the first time such a recognition was bestowed upon a club player in the Argentine football league.

== Negative aspects ==
Despite the above successes, the club was also mired in controversy during Muñoz's tenure. Soon after becoming a president, he decided unilaterally to separate several team players from the main roster, including some iconic ones who had been part of the runner-up campaigns of the mid-1990s (e.g., Gustavo Barros Schelotto, Enzo Noce and Andrés Yllana). In 2005, the old Gimnasia stadium (known as El Bosque, the Forest) became suspended after incidents that took place during a decisive game against Newell's Old Boys. As president, he made the decision to play temporarily in the much-debated "Estadio Ciudad de La Plata" venue. However, that temporary move soon became de facto permanent, after he refused to comply with the various reforms requested for the old stadium by the CoProSeDe, the provincial organization in charge of security at sporting venues. Muñoz argued that the cost of making these reforms was “unsurmountable” (approximately 2 million Argentine pesos). This decision was resisted by many who demanded a return to El Bosque. After the end of Muñoz's mandate in 2007, the new management began finally the renovations; it is believed that Gimnasia y Esgrima La Plata should be able to use the old field some time during 2008.

Other controversial events took place in 2006–2007. In October 2006, at half-time during a match against Boca Juniors in La Plata, Muñoz appeared in the dressing rooms, requesting to be able to talk to the referee and voice a number of complaints. The result was the suspension of the game by the referee, and a six-month reproof by the Asociación del Fútbol Argentino to the President of Gimnasia. Prior to the continuation of this game, several weeks later, some Gimnasia players complained that they had been pressed by nondescript visitors who wished that Gimnasia would allow a victory by Boca, so as not to benefit archrivals Estudiantes. In the outcry that followed, Muñoz was widely considered responsible for these events. Gimnasia went on to lose the game 1–4, after leading 1–0 at the time of suspension.

Muñoz's tenure was also marked by the worst-ever defeat at a La Plata derby (a 0-7 fall against Estudiantes), as well as by the relegation of the once-powerful basketball team, following the withdrawal of strong financial support for this sport in the club.

Juan José Muñoz died on 8 May 2013 after a long illness. He was 62 years old.
