= Ariel Pereyra (defender) =

Argentine footballer

Personal information
- Full name: Ariel Gustavo Pereyra
- Date of birth: 2 October 1973 (age 53)
- Place of birth: Berazategui, Argentina
- Height: 1.87 m (6 ft 2 in)
- Positions: Left-back; centre-back

Team information
- Current team: Gimnasia La Plata (manager)

Youth career
- 1984–1991: Gimnasia La Plata

Senior career*
Years	Team	Apps	(Gls)
1992–2001	Gimnasia La Plata	168	(26)
2002–2004	Colón	102	(5)
2004–2006	San Lorenzo	37	(4)
2007	Huachipato	18	(0)
2008	Unión La Calera	15	(0)

Managerial career
- 2009–2012: Gimnasia La Plata (reserves)
- 2012–2015: Lanús (assistant)
- 2016: Palermo (assistant)
- 2016–2018: Boca Juniors (assistant)
- 2019–2020: LA Galaxy (assistant)
- 2021–2023: Paraguay (assistant)
- 2025: Colón
- 2026: Gimnasia La Plata (reserves)
- 2026: Gimnasia La Plata (interim)
- 2026–: Gimnasia La Plata
- * Club domestic league appearances and goals

Ariel Gustavo Pereyra (born 2 October 1973) is an Argentine football manager and former player who played as left-back and centre-back. He is the current manager of Gimnasia La Plata.

Pereyra played more than of 200 games at the Argentine Primera División, and his last club was Unión La Calera.

== Career ==
Pereyra began his football career at Gimnasia de La Plata youth ranks at a very young age, being after promoted to the first adult team in the 1992–93 season, making his official debut against Belgrano in a 1–1 draw. After nine years in that club, in 2002, he joined to Colón de Santa Fe and then to Argentine powerhouse San Lorenzo de Almagro, two years later.

In January 2007, Pereyra moved to Chilean Primera División club Huachipato, playing the Apertura Tournament, in where his team qualified to the Copa Sudamericana of that year, being immediately eliminated by Colo-Colo. After of fail to play the Clausura Tournament, he joined to Primera B side of the same country, Unión La Calera, in where he finished his football career, after of play just 15 games in the second tier tournament.

After of his retirement, Pereyra accepted the work of be the coach of the youth ranks of his former club Gimnasia de La Plata, declaring also that he wants direct the first adult team of Primera División.
