= Copa Centenario de la AFA =

- The trophy awarded to champions
- Organiser(s): AFA
- Founded: 1993
- Abolished: 1994; 31 years ago
- Region: Argentina
- Teams: 18
- Last champions: Gimnasia y Esg. LP
- Broadcaster: TyC Sports

The Copa Centenario de la AFA was an official Argentine football cup competition contested by teams playing in Primera División. The championship was organized by the Argentine Football Association in 1993 in order to celebrate its 100th anniversary. The winner of this tournament was the Gimnasia y Esgrima (LP), who defeated River Plate in the final match.

== History ==
Its model being based on the Coppa Italia, or the Spanish Copa del Rey, all the squads of Primera División who participated in the 1992–93 season (except for Talleres de Córdoba and San Martín de Tucumán), played home and away matches with their classic rivals ('derby matches') during the first phase. Afterwards, teams played two other rounds (winners' and losers' bracket), following a system of "double elimination".

Gimnasia y Esgrima was the winner on the winners' bracket, while River Plate won the losers' bracket. The final match was played in January 1994 at Gimnasia's venue, Carmelo Zerillo Stadium. Gimnasia needed to win the match to become the champion, while River Plate had to defeat El Lobo in two opportunities, as River Plate had accessed to the final by winning the losers' round. However, an additional match became unnecessary, as Gimnasia defeated River by 3–1, thereby winning the only edition of the Copa Centenario. This Cup constitutes until today one of the two official titles that Gimnasia y Esgrima (LP) has won in the Argentine top-division competitions, the other one being the 1929 Primera División championship. These conquests are celebrated with the "two stars" often displayed on the team's jerseys.

As winners of the Copa Centenario, Gimnasia y Esgrima had the privilege to play the friendly Sanwa Bank Cup against the champion of 1994 Japanese League, the Verdy Kawasaki. That game finished in a 2–2 draw, and it was decided on penalties, Verdy Kawasaki being the winners.

== First round ==
First Leg: between June 3 and July 3, 1993. Second leg: between July 2 and July 11, 1993.

Team 1	Agg.	Team 2	1st leg	2nd leg
Vélez Sársfield	2–1	Ferro Carril Oeste	1–1	1–0
Racing	5–3	Independiente	2–1	3–2
Platense	3–0	Lanús	0–0	3–0
Belgrano	2–2 (5-3p)	Deportivo Mandiyú	1–1	1–1
San Lorenzo	2–0	Huracán	2–0	0–0
Argentinos Juniors	1–0	Deportivo Español	1–0	0–0
Newell's Old Boys	3–0	Rosario Central	2–0	1–0
Gimnasia y Esgrima (LP)	1–0	Estudiantes (LP)	1–0	0–0
River Plate	1–0	Boca Juniors	0–0	1–0

- Winners qualified to First winners Round, losers advanced to First losers Round

== Winners round ==
=== First winners round ===
Played on July 11, 1993.

Team 1	Score	Team 2
Racing	3–2	Vélez Sársfield
Belgrano	2–0	Platense
Argentinos Juniors	1–0	San Lorenzo
Gimnasia y Esgrima (LP)	1–0	Newell's Old Boys

Bye: River Plate

- Winners qualified to Second winners Round, losers advanced to Second losers Round

=== Second winners round ===
Played on July 18 & 25, 1993.

Team 1	Score	Team 2
Argentinos Juniors	1–2	Gimnasia y Esgrima (LP)
Racing	1–0	River Plate

Bye: Belgrano

- Winners qualified to Third winners Round, losers advanced to Third losers Round

=== Third winners round ===
Played on August 1, 1993.

Team 1	Score	Team 2
Belgrano	3–2	Racing

Bye: Gimnasia y Esgrima (LP)

- Winners qualified to Winners round Final, loser advanced to Third losers round

=== Winners round Final ===
Played on August 7, 1993.

Team 1	Score	Team 2
Belgrano	2–2 (3-4p)	Gimnasia y Esgrima (LP)

- Winner qualified to the Final, loser advanced to Losers Round Final

== Losers round ==
=== First losers round ===
Played on July 11, 1993.

Team 1	Score	Team 2
Independiente	3–0	Ferro Carril Oeste
Deportivo Mandiyú	1–0	Lanús
Deportivo Español	2–1	Huracán
Estudiantes (LP)	0–1	Rosario Central

Bye: Boca Juniors

=== Second losers round ===
Played on July 18 & 25, 1993.

Team 1	Score	Team 2
Independiente	1–0	Platense
Deportivo Español	2–1	Newell's Old Boys
San Lorenzo	0–0 (6-5p)	Rosario Central
Boca Juniors	1–0	Vélez Sársfield

Bye: Deportivo Mandiyú

=== Third losers round ===
Played between July 25 & August 8, 1993.

Team 1	Score	Team 2
Deportivo Español	1–0	Deportivo Mandiyú
Argentinos Juniors	1–0	Boca Juniors
River Plate	3–0	Independiente

Bye: San Lorenzo

=== Fourth losers round ===
Played on August 14 & 16, 1993.

Team 1	Score	Team 2
River Plate	3–2	Deportivo Español
San Lorenzo	2–1	Racing

Bye: Argentinos Juniors

=== Fifth losers round ===
Played on August 27, 1993.

Team 1	Score	Team 2
River Plate	2–1	Argentinos Juniors

Bye: San Lorenzo

=== Sixth losers round ===
Played on December 21, 1993.

Team 1	Score	Team 2
River Plate	3–2	San Lorenzo

=== Losers round Final ===
Played on January 21, 1994.

Team 1	Score	Team 2
River Plate	2–1	Belgrano

== Final ==
30 January 1994

Gimnasia y Esgrima (LP)	3–1	River Plate
Guerra 44'; P. Fernández 76'; Guillermo B.S. 89'	Report	Villalba 49'

Juan C. Zerillo, La Plata
Attendance: 25,000
Referee: Javier Castrilli

== Top goalscorer ==
Player	Goals	Team
(Argentina) Claudio López	5	Racing
