= Saturnino Perdriel =

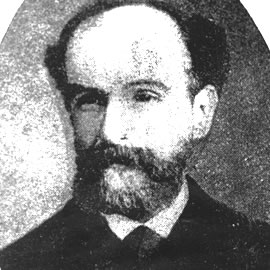
Saturnino Perdriel 1887

Saturnino Perdriel (died 1888) was the Argentine founder and first president of Gimnasia y Esgrima La Plata. He was a civil functionary in the Treasury Department of the Province of Buenos Aires.

Upon the death of Perdriel, Etcheverry would take up office as president.
