= Arturo Naón =

Argentine footballer

Arturo "Torito" Naón
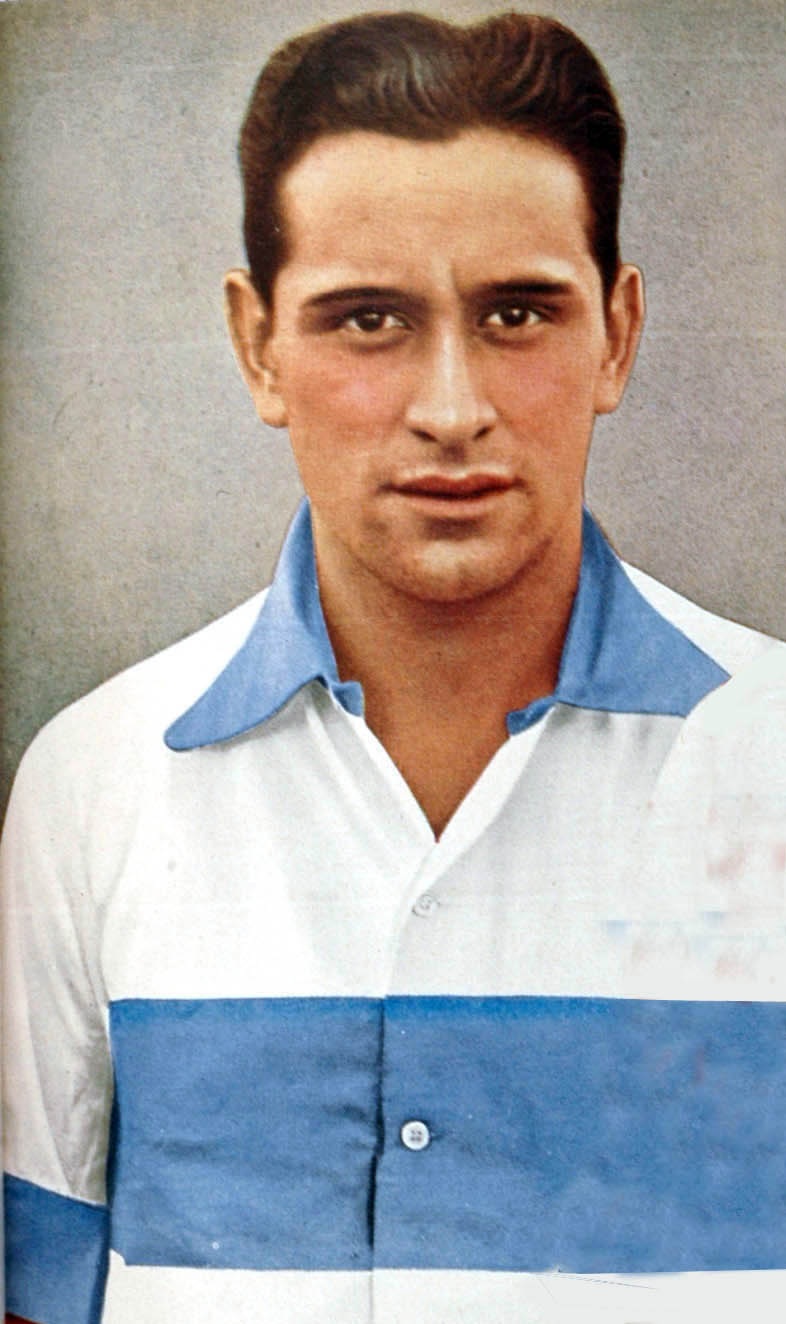

Personal information
- Full name: Arturo "Torito" Naón
- Date of birth: 31 December 1912
- Place of birth: La Plata, Argentina
- Date of death: 5 May 1999
- Place of death: Mar del Plata, Argentina
- Position: Striker

Senior career*
Years	Team	Apps	(Gls)
1927–1933	Gimnasia LP		
1934–1937	San Lorenzo	51	(24)
1938	Racing Club	7	(1)
1939	Flamengo	11	(3)
1940–1943	Gimnasia LP		

International career
- Argentina
- * Club domestic league appearances and goals

Arturo "Torito" Naón (31 December 1912 in La Plata, Buenos Aires, Argentina – 5 May 1999) was an Argentine football striker. Naón played a total of 126 matches and scored 177 goals in the Argentina League, including his amateur-era seasons (pre-1931) and his professional-era seasons (post-1931) with the Primera División Argentina where he played 150 matches and scored a total of 120 goals.

He is the top goal scorer of Gimnasia y Esgrima La Plata with 106 goals in 64 matches.
