= Adolfo Bullrich =

Argentinian politician and entrepreneur (1833–1904)

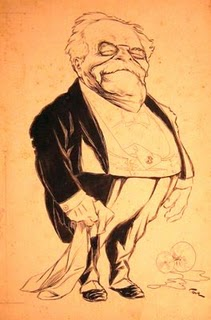
Adolfo Jorge Bullrich

Adolfo Jorge Bullrich (30 December 1833 – 8 March 1904) was an Argentine military and merchant who became Mayor of the City of Buenos Aires between 1898 and 1902, during the first part of the second presidency of Julio Argentino Roca.

Adolfo Jorge Bullrich was born in 1833, son of Augusto Bullrich, a German who had arrived in Buenos Aires as a prisoner of war, caught as an enemy soldier during the War of Brazil, and after his release had settled in the city.

Adolfo Bullrich is a paternal ancestor of politician Patricia Bullrich.
