= Pablo Morant =

Argentine footballer and manager

Personal information
- Full name: Pablo Javier Morant
- Date of birth: 30 June 1970 (age 56)
- Place of birth: Esquel, Argentina
- Height: 1.89 m (6 ft 2 in)
- Position: Defender

Team information
- Current team: Toluca (Assistant)

Senior career*
Years	Team	Apps	(Gls)
1990–1996	Gimnasia (LP)	140	(16)
1996–1997	Hércules	9	(0)
1997–2003	Colón	141	(9)

Managerial career
- 2003: Colón
- 2004–2005: Huracán de Tres Arroyos
- 2010: Gimnasia (LP)
- 2013: Colón
- 2014–2015: Sportivo Estudiantes
- 2016: Villa San Carlos
- 2018–2019: Toluca (Assistant)
- 2020: Mitre
- 2021: Toluca (Assistant)
- 2022: Querétaro (Assistant)
- 2022–2023: Juárez (Assistant)
- 2025–: Toluca (Assistant)
- * Club domestic league appearances and goals

Pablo Javier Morant (born June 30, 1970, in Esquel) is a retired Argentine footballer. He played for a number of clubs both in Argentina and Spain, including Club de Gimnasia y Esgrima La Plata, Colón de Santa Fe and Hércules CF.

After he retired from playing, Morant became a football coach. He worked with Gimnasia y Esgrima La Plata's youth team before managing the senior club on an interim basis in 2010. Morant coaches the youth side of Colón de Santa Fe.
