= Mariano Messera =

Argentine footballer (born 1978)

Personal information
- Full name: Mariano Messera
- Date of birth: 23 February 1978 (age 48)
- Place of birth: Posadas, Argentina
- Height: 1.72 m (5 ft 8 in)
- Position: Attacking midfielder

Youth career
- Gimnasia La Plata

Senior career*
Years	Team	Apps	(Gls)
1997–2002	Gimnasia La Plata	160	(36)
2002	Cruz Azul	16	(1)
2003–2004	Rosario Central	49	(5)
2004	Catania	5	(0)
2005	San Lorenzo	13	(0)
2006	O'Higgins	14	(3)
2006–2007	Skoda Xanthi	22	(3)
2007–2008	Rosario Central	20	(0)
2008–2010	Gimnasia La Plata	45	(3)
2010–2011	San Martín SJ	23	(2)
2012–2014	Deportivo Morón	25	(0)
2015	Barrio Traut	–	(–)
Total		392	(53)

Managerial career
- Gimnasia La Plata (reserves)
- 2017: Gimnasia La Plata (caretaker)
- 2020–2021: Gimnasia La Plata
- * Club domestic league appearances and goals

Mariano Messera (born 23 February 1978) is an Argentine football manager and former player who played as a midfielder.

== Club career ==
Born in Posadas, Messera started his playing career in 1997 for Gimnasia La Plata, where he played 160 league games and scored 36 goals.

In 2002, he played for Cruz Azul in Mexico before returning to Argentina to play for Rosario Central until 2004 when he had a short spell with Calcio Catania.

In 2005, Messera played for San Lorenzo, O'Higgins in Chile, and Skoda Xanthi of Greece before returning to Rosario Central in 2007.

== Coaching career ==
Messera has served as coach of the Gimnasia La Plata reserves.

After Gustavo Alfaro was fired in May 2017, Messera and Leandro Martini was appointed joint caretaker manager. In November 2019, the duo was appointed caretaker managers once again after Diego Maradona left. However, two days later, Maradona rejoined the club.
