= Hugo Guerra =

Uruguayan footballer (1966-2018)

- Guerra while playing for Boca Juniors

Personal information
- Full name: Hugo Romeo Guerra Cabrera
- Date of birth: 25 February 1966
- Place of birth: Canelones, Uruguay
- Date of death: 11 May 2018 (aged 52)
- Place of death: Arrecifes, Argentina
- Height: 1.86 m (6 ft 1 in)
- Position: Forward

Senior career*
Years	Team	Apps	(Gls)
1982–1983	Peñarol		
1984	Colón		
1985	El Tanque Sisley		
1986–1989	Nacional		
1990–1994	Gimnasia y Esgrima (LP)	97	(28)
1994	Toluca	7	(0)
1995–1996	Huracán	37	(15)
1996	Boca Juniors	12	(5)
1997–1998	Huracán	43	(9)
1998	Ferro Carril Oeste	29	(6)
1999–2001	Almirante Brown	29	(18)
2001	Atlético Tucumán		
2002–2004	Tiro Federal		
2004	Juventud de Pergamino		

International career
1992–1993	Uruguay	8	(1)
- * Club domestic league appearances and goals

Hugo Romeo Guerra Cabrera (25 February 1966 – 11 May 2018) was a Uruguayan footballer.

== Club career ==
Guerra played for Gimnasia y Esgrima La Plata, Huracán, Boca Juniors and Ferro Carril Oeste in the Primera División de Argentina. He also had a spell with Toluca in the Primera División de Mexico.

== International career ==
Guerra made eight appearances for the senior Uruguay national football team from 1992 to 1993. He played for Uruguay at the Copa América 1993. Guerra made his debut in a friendly match against Brazil (1-0 win) on April 30, 1992 in the Estadio Centenario in Montevideo under coach Luis Alberto Cubilla.

He died on 11 May 2018 at the age of 52 from cardiac arrest.
