= Club de Gimnasia y Esgrima La Plata =

Argentine sports club

Gimnasia y Esgrima La Plata
- Full name: Club de Gimnasia y Esgrima La Plata
- Nicknames: El Lobo (The Wolf); Los Triperos (The gut-handlers)
- Short name: CGE
- Founded: 3 June 1887; 139 years ago
- Ground: Estadio Juan Carmelo Zerillo
- Capacity: 30,973
- President: Carlos Anacleto
- Manager: Ariel Pereyra
- League: Primera División
- 2025: 19th of 30
- Website: gimnasia.org.ar
Home colours	Away colours	Third colours

Club de Gimnasia y Esgrima La Plata (Spanish pronunciation: [ˈkluβ ðe ximˈnasjaj esˈɣɾima la ˈplata]; La Plata Gymnastics and Fencing Club), also known simply as Gimnasia, is an Argentine professional sports club based in the city of La Plata, Buenos Aires Province. Founded in 1887 as "Club de Gimnasia y Esgrima", the club is mostly known for its football team, which currently plays in Primera División, the first division of the Argentine football league system. The club was most famously managed by footballing legend Diego Maradona, from September 2019 until his death in November 2020.

Apart from football, CGE also hosts a large number of sports such as athletics, basketball, boxing, chess, fencing, futsal, artistic gymnastics, field hockey, martial arts (aikido, karate, kendo, taekwondo), swimming, roller skating, tennis, volleyball, and weightlifting.

== History ==
The "Club de Gimnasia y Esgrima La Plata" was founded on 3 June 1887 as a civil association, and thus is the oldest surviving football club still participating in the Argentine league. The club also claims to be the oldest football club in the Americas, despite other football clubs, such as Peruvian Lima Cricket F.C., having older foundation dates. Its foundation came barely five years after the creation of the City of La Plata in 1882.

The first sports offered to its members were, as its Spanish name indicates, gymnastics and fencing. Clubs supporting these sports were common among the upper classes at the end of the 19th century (cf. the prior foundation of Gimnasia y Esgrima de Buenos Aires in 1880). Later on, other disciplines were added, including track and field, football, basketball and rugby.

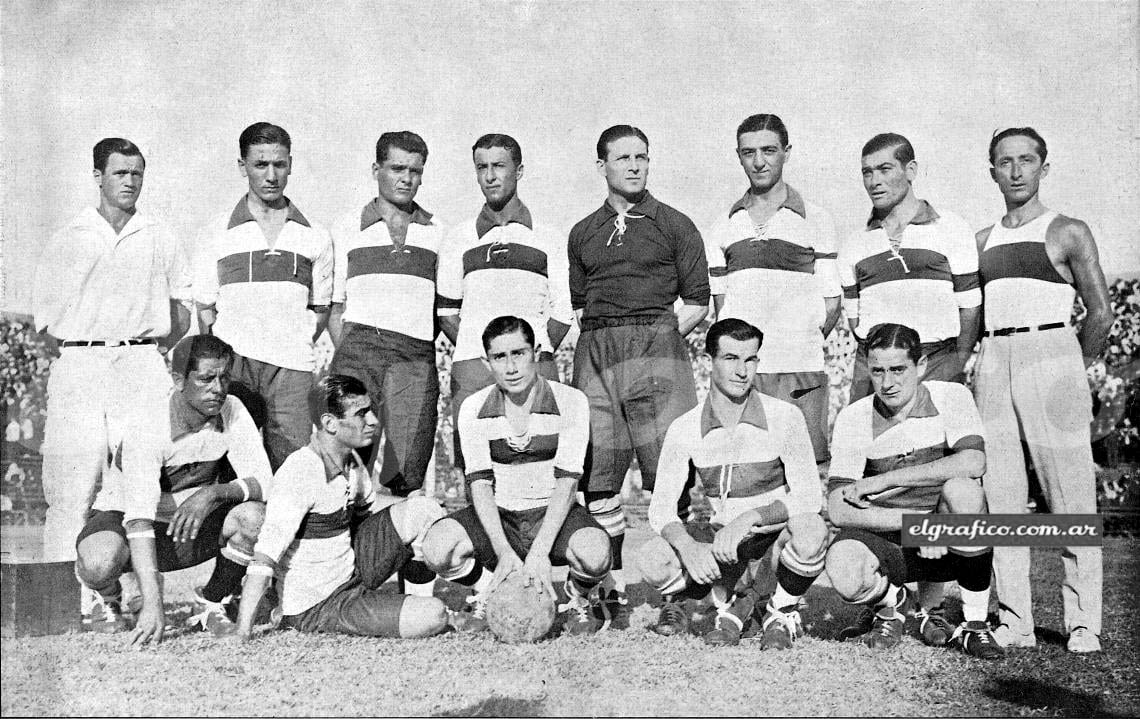
The 1929 team that won its only Primera División title to date. Francisco Varallo is seated second, from left to right

The institution changed name a few times: from April to December 1897 it was called a "Club de Esgrima" (in English, "Fencing Club") because fencing was the only activity practised at that moment. On 17 December 1897 it returned to its original name: "Club de Gimnasia y Esgrima" ("Gymnastics and Fencing Club"). From July 1952 to 30 September 1955, the club was named "Club de Gimnasia y Esgrima de Eva Perón" ("Gymnastics and Fencing Club of Eva Perón"), because the city of La Plata itself had been renamed "Eva Perón" in 1952, after Eva Perón's death. The city returned to its previous name during the government of the "Liberating Revolution", and so did the club. However, it remained unduly identified legally as "Club de Gimnasia y Esgrima de La Plata" ("Gymnastics and Fencing Club of La Plata"), a mistake that was corrected on 7 August 1964 after the new statute was approved.

Gimnasia y Esgrima was promoted to the first division after becoming champions of the División Intermedia of Argentine football in 1915. Later, in 1929, the club won its first Primera División championship. During successive years, Gimnasia became champion of Primera B in 1944, 1947 and 1952 and won the Copa Centenario de la AFA in 1994. Additionally, the squad has been a runner-up in the Primera División on five occasions. The club has remained at the top level of Argentine football for 73 seasons, tying it with Newell's Old Boys for the eighth longest participation at this level.

== Clásico Platense ==
The Clásico Platense (La Plata derby) is the nickname given to the match between La Plata's two main football teams: Gimnasia y Esgrima La Plata and Estudiantes de La Plata. The first official derby took place as part of the Primera División season on 27 August 1916. On that occasion, Gimnasia won 1–0 over Estudiantes, with an own goal by Ludovico Pastor.

The first derby of the professional era took place on 14 June 1931. Between 12 August 1932 and 9 September 1934 Gimnasia won five consecutive La Plata derbies, the longest run of victories in that derby until Estudiantes emulated that feat in 2006–08. On 25 June 1963 Gimnasia obtained a 5–2 victory, this being the best result so far against Estudiantes. On the other hand, Gimnasia's worst result was a 7–0 defeat on 15 October 2006.

A curiosity among the derbies occurred on 5 April 1992, when Gimnasia won over Estudiantes 1–0 at the latter's stadium. On that date, as the stands erupted and Gimnasia's fans shouted in celebration at the goal being scored, the seismograph of the local Astronomical Observatory registered a low-intensity seismic event. That goal was scored by the Uruguayan José Perdomo on a freekick, and it has been known ever since as "El gol del terremoto" ("The earthquake goal").

== Presidents ==
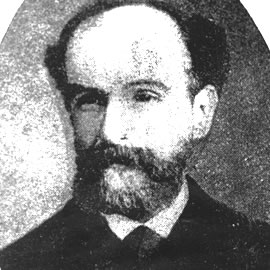
Saturnino Perdriel was the first president of the club

Through more than 120 years of history, the Club de Gimnasia y Esgrima La Plata has had 56 presidents, who are elected individuals who took on the responsibility of steering the Institution. Many of them contributed to the growth of the club over the years. Some of them have remained more vivid in the fans' memory for their achievements or outstanding works.

Saturnino Perdriel was the founder and first president of Gimnasia y Esgrima La Plata. Perdriel was a merchant during the first few years of the city of La Plata, in addition to being a civil servant at the Treasury Department of the Province of Buenos Aires. He died prematurely in 1888, after one year as Club president.

Currently, the President of Club de Gimnasia y Esgrima La Plata is chosen by its associates, by means of general elections that take place every three years. Any club member over 18 years of age, and with at least three years membership of the club, have a right to vote. Members with over seven years membership have a right to be elected to the Club governmental body, the Management Commission or "Directory".

The most recent President of Gimnasia y Esgrima La Plata is Gabriel Pellegrino, who refused to run for re-election in 2019. On 15 December 2019, however, Pellegrino, who was encouraged to seek re-election from club manager Diego Maradona, was re-elected to a three-year term.

== Facilities ==
Gimnasia's facilities include, besides its football stadium, a campus of 160 hectares, a campus for children's football, a sports center, a kindergarten, a primary school and one high school. There are also dozens of subsidiaries located in the country and the world.

- Estadio Juan Carmelo Zerillo: also known as El Bosque (Spanish for "the forest", because it is located in the La Plata park of the same name), has the capacity to accommodate approximately 24,544 spectators.
- Estancia Chica: It is a property of 160 hectares, where the professional football team trains before each match.
- El Bosquecito: It is a campus of 11 hectares where children's categories practice and play.
- Other: The club has opened a kindergarten in 1999 (works on Calle 62 No. 474), a Primary School called "Dr. René Favaloro" opened in 2001 (on streets 123 and 58) and a High School opened in early 2008.
- Polideportivo Gimnasia y Esgrima La Plata: Opened in 1978, Gimnasia y Esgrima has a sports complex, where it competes in the first division of basketball and volleyball with a capacity for 2,600 people, which rises to 3,500 spectators when performing musicals.
- Headquarters: In addition to the administration of the club and the attention of the members, it is possible to play sports like basketball and volleyball, among others. It also has a gym.

== Anthem ==
The official anthem of Gimnasia was written in 1915 by the popular poet born in Magdalena, Délfor B. Méndez and the music was composed by the master Juan Serpentini, who composed versions of the Argentine National Anthem and "El tambor de Tacuarí", with Rafael Obligado's letter.

The official anthem of Gimnasia was intoned by the first time on 9 July 1915 on the occasion of the reception that was given to the delegation of the club River Plate of Uruguay. In 1967 the official anthem was recorded by the musical ensemble of the Buenos Aires Police.

== Emblems and colors ==
=== Badge ===
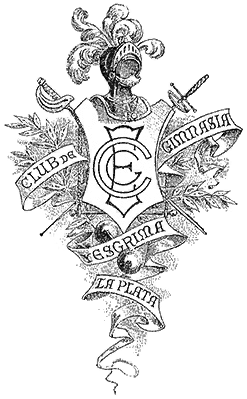
The first heraldic emblem of the club by artist Emilio Coutaret (1901)

The current shield of Gimnasia y Esgrima is a wreath in which, in the top part, a helmet is outlined with a heraldic crest. At the center, on enamel and with the colors of the club (white and navy blue), is the club monogram appears. In the top cantons, like a guard, there appears the hilts of a saber and a foil, with their sharp points emerging in lower part of the shield. To the sides of the center laurels spread around the helmet.

Since its inception, the club shield has undergone some modifications. The first symbol of the club appeared on a document dated 30 April 1888. This emblem consisted in the coat of arms of La Plata with the legend "Club de Gimnasia y Esgrima La Plata – Mens Sana in Corpore Sano" surrounding it. The second seal appeared between 1894 and 1897, with the legend "Club de Esgrima" (fencing was the only activity of the club by then).

But the first heraldic emblem was indeed devised in 1901 by artist Emilio Coutauret, who was also a member of GELP board. That emblem was characterized by a handcrafted and adorned design. Because this symbol could not be reproduced easily at small sizes, the club commissioned technical draftsman Raúl Felices to design a more synthetic emblem. As a result, a new symbol was released in 1928. It has remained until present days.

During Héctor Domínguez's presidency, the abbreviation CGE (Club de Gimnasia y Esgrima) at the center of the shield was replaced by GELP (Gimnasia y Esgrima La Plata). Since the beginning of Walter Gisande's presidency, it was decided to return to the original abbreviation of 'CGE'.

=== Uniform ===
The official historical uniform of Gimnasia y Esgrima is based on the colours displayed in the club shield, as established in the institutional statute, a white jersey with a single horizontal navy-blue stripe over the chest.

In the first years of the institution, the colors adopted were white and light blue, seeking to highlight the fact that it was an Argentine club. The first vest used by the team had vertical white and light blue stripes.

In 1905, it was decided to change the colors to make it distinct from Racing Club. This resulted in a vest with vertical stripes of white and navy-blue color.

Finally, in 1910, the design was modified, changing the vertical stripes into the horizontal band of navy-blue color over a white jersey, which has been used ever since.

==== Uniform evolution ====
1903	1905	1910–present

==== Apparel and sponsors ====
The table below details the companies that provided the team's apparel, and have been sponsoring the club since 1980 to date:

Period	Manufacturer
1978–81	Adidas
1982–84	Topper
1985–93	Adidas
1993–98	Hummel
1999–00	New Balance
2001–08	Puma
2009–10	Kappa
2011–17	Penalty
2017–21	Le Coq Sportif
2021–22	Hummel
2023–25	Givova
2026–	Joma

Period	Sponsor
1990–92	Pegamax
1992	Diario El Día
1993–01	Banco Municipal de La Plata
2001–02	Fideos Manera
2002	Ticket Vip
2003–04	Suin
2004	Liderar Seguros
2005	Medical Hair
2006	Crown Mustang
2007–08	Motomel
2008–10	La Nueva Seguros
2010–	Rapicuotas

== Supporters ==
=== Fan base ===
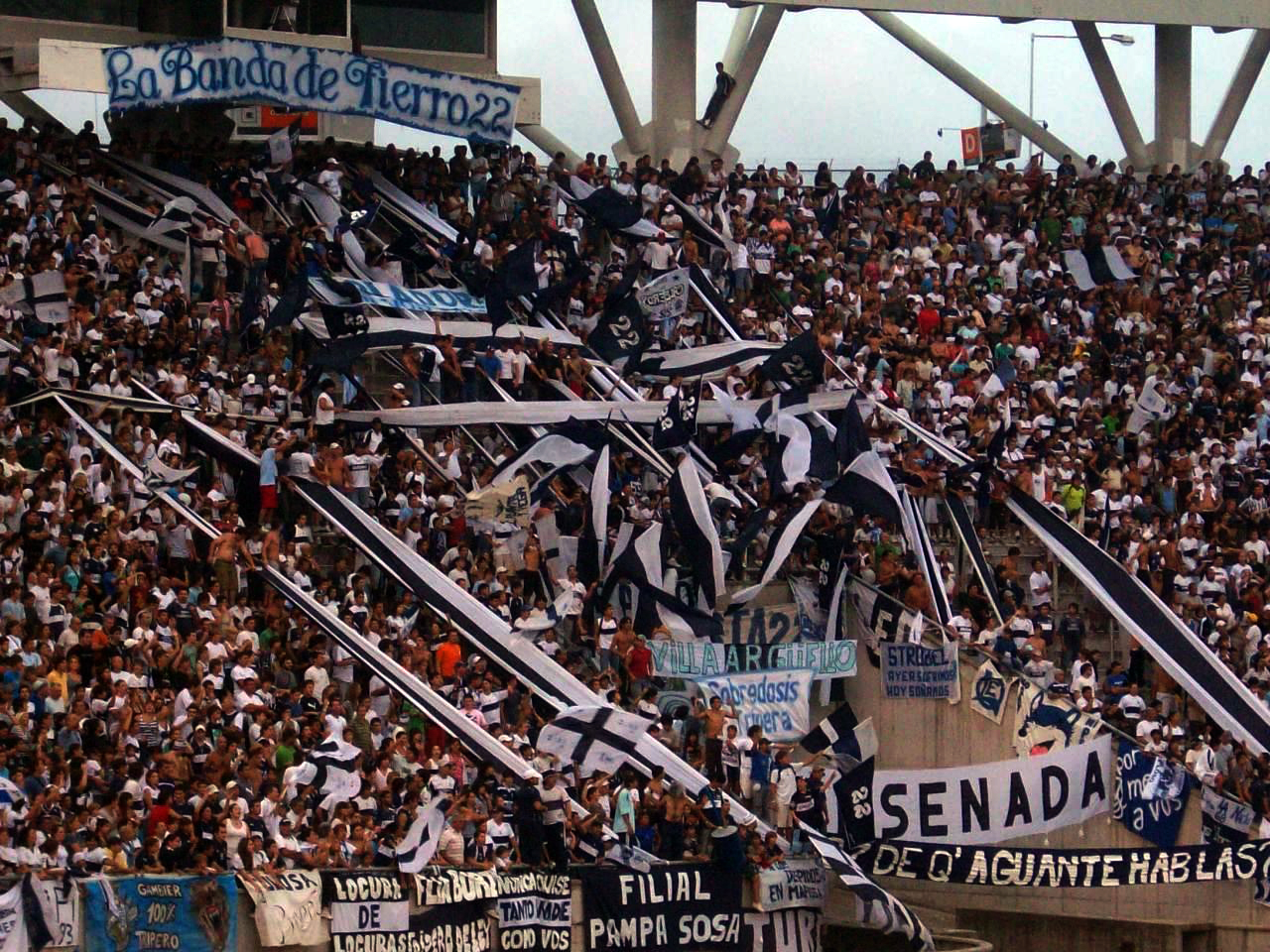
La 22 (club's barra brava) at Estadio Ciudad de La Plata during the match against Boca Juniors in the 2008 Torneo Clausura

Within the city of La Plata and its environs, Gimnasia's fan base used to be identified with the working class, in contrast with the mostly middle class Estudiantes' constituency. Most of Gimnasia y Esgrima fans are from the Greater La Plata area. The club currently has 35,000 members. It is one of the 10 clubs with the most members in Argentina.

The barra brava section named itself "La 22", after 22nd street in La Plata where many famous violent fans lived, notably Marcelo Amuchástegui. Known as Loco Fierro, Amuchástegui was famous for his exploits, such as hanging a 100-meter Gimnasia flag in the Bombonera stadium. He was shot to death by Rosarian police in a murky episode on 28 May 1991, allegedly during an armed robbery.

Several surveys carried out over the years in Argentina, place Gimnasia in the eighth place in the ranking with the most fans in Argentina.

As is the case with other clubs in the Argentine First Division, the fans celebrate the "Worldwide Day of Gimnasia's Fans" on 10 December with a large party and outside gathering.

=== Nicknames ===
Since the 1960s, Gimnasia has been known as El Lobo (short for "El Lobo del Bosque", Spanish for "the wolf in the Forest") after the story of "Red Riding Hood", since its historical football field is located in the middle of La Plata's main park, known as El Bosque ("the forest"). Another nickname, mensanas, derives from the Latin motto used in the shield: Mens sana in corpore sano (a healthy mind in a healthy body).

An original nickname was (and still is) triperos ("tripe" or "gut-handlers"). This name has its origin in the fact that many of Gimnasia's original supporters worked in the meat-processing plants of nearby Berisso. In newspaper caricatures from the early 1900s, Gimnasia was accordingly depicted as a "butcher", instead of the current "wolf". However, Gimnasia is still often greeted by its fans with a resounding "Tripa corazón!" (Spanish for "Heart of tripe!"). Curiously, the same nickname is applied when referring to the population of Porto in Portugal, although the meaning of the nickname in Portuguese is closer to "tripe-eaters".

Another nickname is basureros ("garbage or waste collectors"), acquired during the presidency of Mr. Venturino in the 1970s, who also managed the private company dealing with trash pickup in La Plata.

== Stadium ==
The Juan Carmelo Zerillo stadium, known as El Bosque (Spanish for "the forest", because it is located in the La Plata park of the same name) had a capacity of 31,460 and was used continuously until 2005.

When a new city stadium was built for La Plata, both Gimnasia and Estudiantes initially chose to stay at their respective fields, but this arrangement collapsed when both fields were closed down due to new security regulations. In the 2006 Clausura tournament, Gimnasia began to use the city stadium for home games. During the Copa Sudamericana 2006, in a match against Fluminense, Gimnasia obtained the current stadium capacity record exceeding 50,000 spectators. The match ended 2–0 for the Wolves.

Beginning in March 2008, Gimnasia made various reforms to its old stadium, seeking to secure the permit for its use at selected games. Finally in June 2008, the "El Bosque" grounds were reapproved for First Division competitions. On Saturday 21 June 2008, in the last game of the Clausure 2008 championship, Gimnasia returned to its old home in a match against Lanús. Now the Juan Carmelo Zerillo stadium has a capacity of 24,544.

== Team records ==
- Best position in First Division: 1st – First Division 1929
- Historic position in Argentine First Division: 8th with 3461 points achieved in First Division, behind River Plate (5425), Boca Juniors (5242), San Lorenzo (4798), Club Atlético Independiente (4765), Racing Club (4609), Vélez Sarsfield (4276) and Estudiantes de La Plata (4229).
- Largest victories: 10–1 to River Plate (in 1905 playing in the División III)

8–1 to Racing Club (22 November 1961)
In international tournaments: 5–1 to Alianza Lima (at the Copa Libertadores 2003)

- Most consecutive victories:

8 (Apertura 2005) The 6th-best in the history of Argentina football. (in small tournaments)
9 (1962)

- Worst defeats:

In national championships: 0–8 to Huracán in First Division 1968.
In international tournaments: 0–4 to IA Sud América (at the Copa Conmebol 1995)

- Participation in international competitions:

Copa Conmebol (3): 1992 (being a Semi-finalist), 1995 and 1998.
Copa Sudamericana (4): 2002, 2006, 2014 and 2017.
Copa Libertadores (2): 2003 and 2007.

== Players ==
Since its founding 133 years ago, more than 800 players have appeared for the club's first team. The youth academy has produced numerous players who went on to achieve national and international prominence, including Guillermo and Gustavo Barros Schelotto, Mariano Messera, Lucas Lobos, Roberto "Pampa" Sosa, Andrés Guglielminpietro, Sebastián Romero, Lucas Licht, Hernán Cristante and Leandro Cufré.

=== Current squad ===
As of 4 March 2026

Note: Flags indicate national team as defined under FIFA eligibility rules; some limited exceptions apply. Players may hold more than one non-FIFA nationality.

No.	Pos.	Nation	Player
1	GK	ARG	Máximo Cabrera
2	DF	ARG	Gonzalo González
4	DF	ARG	Renzo Giampaoli (on loan from Boca Juniors)
5	MF	ARG	Ignacio Miramón (on loan from Lille)
6	DF	ARG	Diego Mastrángelo
7	FW	ARG	Manuel Panaro
8	MF	ARG	Nacho Fernández (captain)
9	FW	ARG	Ivo Mammini
10	MF	ARG	Nicolás Barros Schelotto
11	FW	ARG	Jeremías Merlo
12	GK	IRL	Patricio Schroeder
13	DF	ARG	Germán Conti (on loan from Racing Club)
14	DF	ARG	Gonzalo Errecalde
15	DF	ARG	Alejo Gelsomino
16	MF	ARG	Augusto Max
18	MF	ARG	Mateo Seoane
19	MF	ARG	Lucas Castro
20	FW	COL	Juan Pérez (on loan from Deportivo Pereira)

No.	Pos.	Nation	Player
21	DF	URU	Enzo Martínez
22	DF	ARG	Matías Melluso
23	GK	ARG	Nelson Insfrán
24	DF	ARG	Pedro Silva Torrejón
25	DF	ARG	Alexis Steimbach
26	FW	ARG	Franco Torres
27	GK	ARG	Julián Kadijević
28	FW	ARG	Cayetano Bolzán
29	FW	ARG	Agustín Auzmendi (on loan from Godoy Cruz)
30	FW	ARG	Jorge de Asís
31	DF	ARG	Bautista Barros Schelotto
32	FW	ARG	Marcelo Torres
33	MF	PAR	Pablo Aguiar
34	MF	ARG	Leandro Mamut
35	DF	ARG	Juan Cortazzo
39	MF	ARG	Facundo Di Biasi
42	MF	ARG	Santiago Villarreal
43	FW	ARG	Maximiliano Zalazar (on loan from Boca Juniors)

==== Other players under contract ====
Note: Flags indicate national team as defined under FIFA eligibility rules; some limited exceptions apply. Players may hold more than one non-FIFA nationality.

No.	Pos.	Nation	Player
28	DF	ARG	Fabricio Corbalán

=== Reserve squad ===
Note: Flags indicate national team as defined under FIFA eligibility rules; some limited exceptions apply. Players may hold more than one non-FIFA nationality.

No.	Pos.	Nation	Player

==== Out on loan ====
Note: Flags indicate national team as defined under FIFA eligibility rules; some limited exceptions apply. Players may hold more than one non-FIFA nationality.

No.	Pos.	Nation	Player
10	FW	ARG	Alan Sosa (at Aldosivi until 31 December 2026)
15	DF	URU	Juan Pintado (at Nacional until 31 December 2026)

=== Individual records ===
==== Most appearances ====
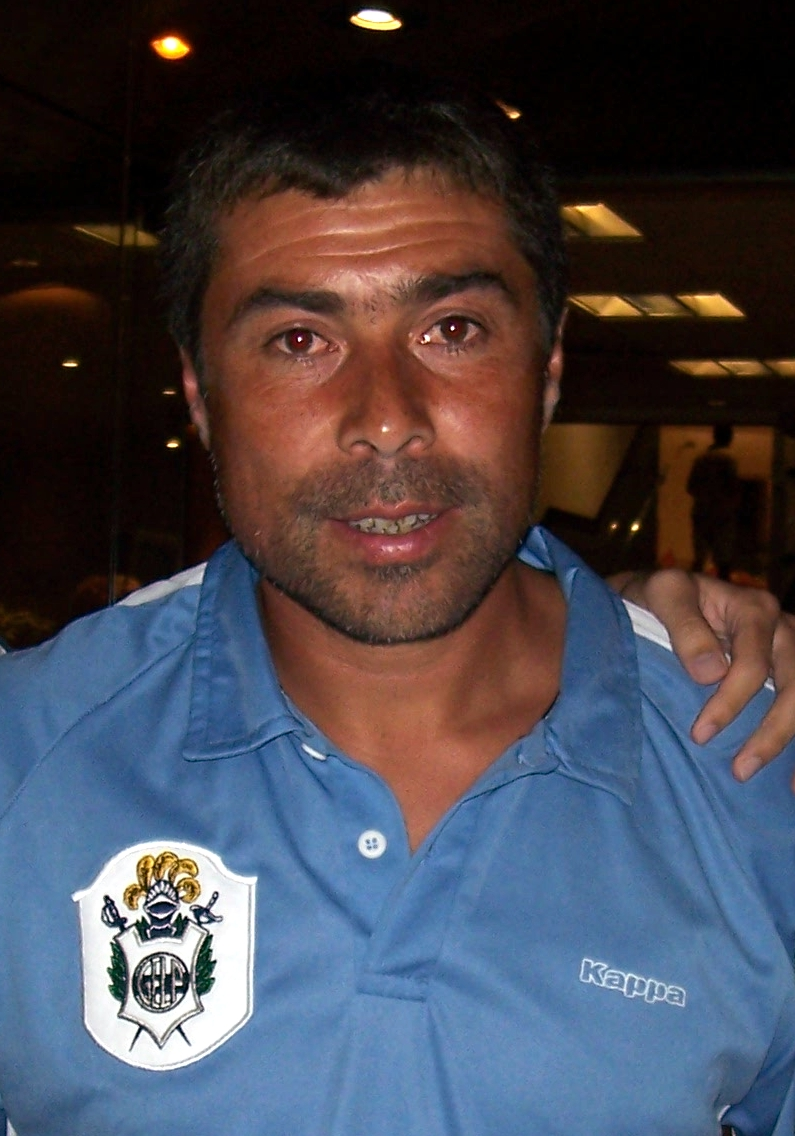
Jorge San Esteban has the record of matches played

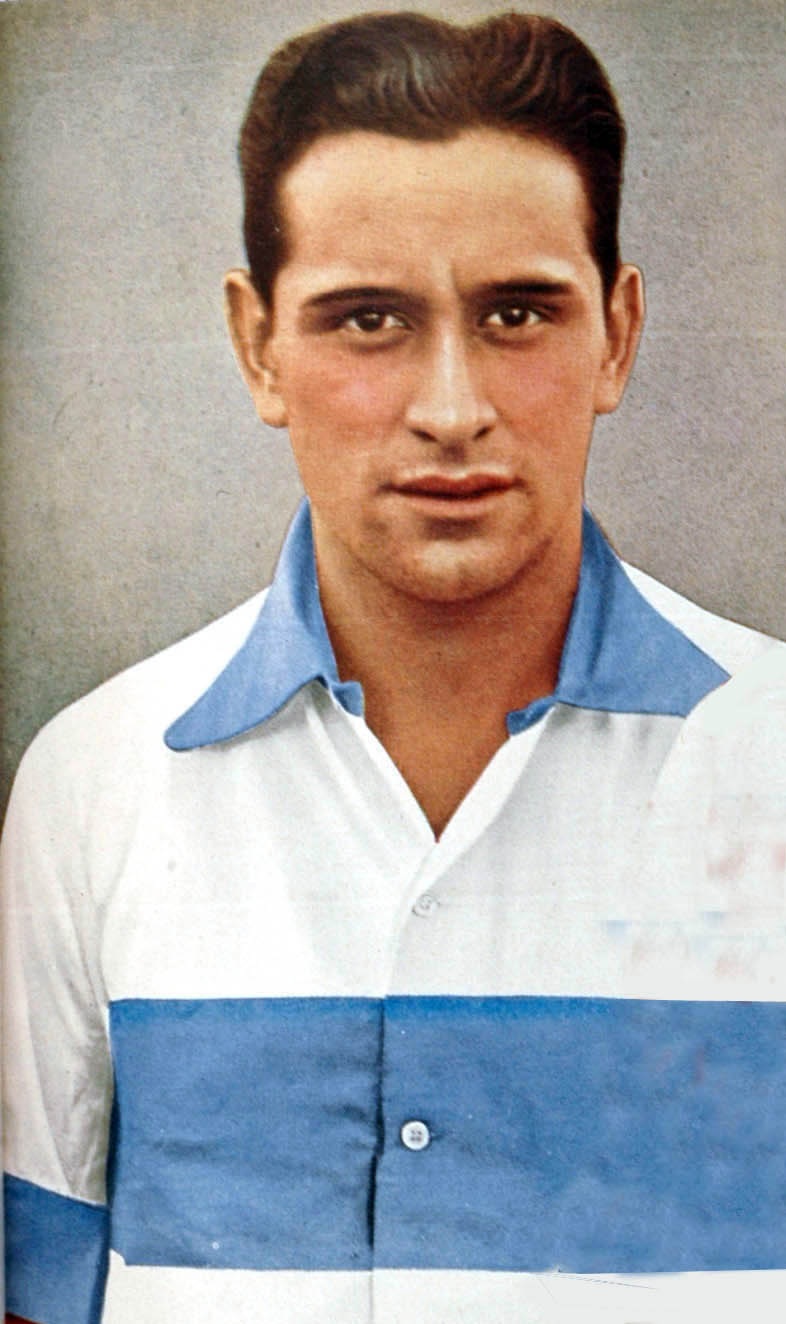
Arturo Naón, all-time top scorer

No.	Player	Pos.	Tenure	Match.
1	(Argentina) Jorge San Esteban	DF	1992–2003, 2004–09	462
2	(Uruguay) Guillermo Sanguinetti	DF	1991–2003	393
3	(Argentina) Oscar Montañez	MF	1932–45	343
4	(Argentina) Rodolfo Smargiassi	DF	1947–58	333
5	(Argentina) Enzo Noce	GK	1990–2004	321

==== Top scorers ====
No.	Player	Pos.	Tenure	Goals
1	(Argentina) Arturo Naón	FW	1927–43	95
2	(Argentina) Manuel Fidel	FW	1933–42	80
3	(Argentina) Gabino Arregui	LW	1934–46	75
4	(Argentina) Diego Bayo	FW	1955–58, 1961–66	71
5	(Argentina) Facundo Sava	FW	1997–2002	64

=== Current coaching staff ===
Position	Staff
Head coach	(Argentina) Ariel Pereyra
Assistant coach	(Argentina) Diego Herner
Assistant coach	(Argentina) Sergio Capitanio
Fitness coach	(Argentina) Juan Cruz Lhomy
Fitness coach	(Argentina) Lucas Gonzalo
Goalkeeping coach	(Argentina) Alejandro Andrada
Video analyst	(Argentina) Facundo Juárez
Video analyst	(Argentina) Ignacio Giusti
Doctor	(Argentina) Pablo Del Compare
Doctor	(Argentina) Flavio Tunessi
Nutritionist	(Argentina) Lucía Márquez
Kinesiologist	(Argentina) Jorge Murúa
Kit man	(Argentina) Leandro Ladogana
Kit man	(Argentina) Emiliano Silva
Kit man	(Argentina) Omar Valenzuela
Masseur	(Argentina) Cristian Ordoñez
Administrative assistant	(Argentina) Cristián Jorgensen

Last updated: 4 March 2026
Source: Liga Profesional de Fútbol

== Managers ==
As there are no records for the 1891–1930 period, since 1931 Gimnasia y Esgrima La Plata has had a total of 64 managers (coaches). The first one was Emérico Hirschl, a Hungarian who trained the team between 1932 and 1934. He was also the first non-Argentine coach in the history of Argentine football.

Several prominent coaches for the team have been Nito Veiga (who led the team to promotion in 1984), Roberto Perfumo (who win the Copa Centenario de la AFA with the team), Carlos Griguol (who coached Gimnasia for ten years) and former footballer Pedro Troglio

- (Argentina) José Ripullone (1929–1930)
- (Argentina) Rafael Lafuente (1931)
- (Hungary) Imre Hirschl (1932–1934)
- (Argentina) Manuel Álvarez (1935)
- (Hungary) Máximo Garay (1937)
- (Uruguay) Roberto Scarone (1948–51)
- (Argentina) Adolfo Pedernera (1955)
- (Hungary) Jorge Ormos (1959)
- (Argentina) Carlos Aldabe (1960–61)
- (Uruguay) Enrique Fernández Viola (1962)
- (Argentina) Adolfo Pedernera (1962)
- (Uruguay) Enrique Fernández Viola (1966), (1967)
- (Argentina) Juan Carlos Murúa (1968–69)
- (Argentina) José Varacka (1968–71)
- (Argentina) Juan Carlos Murúa (1971)
- (Argentina) José Varacka (1973–74)
- (Argentina) Juan Urriolabeitía (1974–75)
- (Argentina) Antonio Rattín (1977–1978)
- (Argentina) José Varacka (1978–79)
- (Argentina) Antonio Rattín (1979)
- (Argentina) José Ramos Delgado (1989–90)
- (Argentina) Alberto Fanesi (1990–91)
- (Argentina) Roberto Perfumo (1993–94)
- (Uruguay) Gregorio Pérez (1 Jan 1999 – 30 June 2000)
- (Argentina) Carlos Griguol (2000–01)
- (Argentina) Carlos Ramacciotti (1 Jan 2002 – 31 December 2003)
- (Argentina) Carlos Griguol (2003–04)
- (Argentina) Mario Gómez (2004)
- (Argentina) Carlos Ischia (1 July 2004 – 30 June 2005)
- (Argentina) Pedro Troglio (2005–07)
- (Colombia) Francisco Maturana (1 April 2007 – 25 August 2007)
- (Argentina) Julio César Falcioni (1 July 2007 – 31 December 2007)
- (Uruguay) Guillermo Sanguinetti (31 Dec 2007–29 Sep 2008)
- (Argentina) Leonardo Madelón (30 Sep 2008–2 Dec 2009)
- (Argentina) Pablo Fernández (interim) (1 Dec 2009 – 16 December 2009)
- (Argentina) Diego Cocca (1 Jan 2010–30 Sep 2010)
- (Argentina) Pablo Morant (30 Sep 2010–31 Dec 2010)
- (Argentina) Ángel Cappa (1 Jan 2011 – 28 April 2011)
- (Argentina) Darío Ortiz (29 April 2011 – 4 October 2011)
- (Argentina) Osvaldo Ingrao (1 July 2011 – 5 October 2011)
- (Argentina) Pedro Troglio (6 Oct 2011 – 14 Mar 2016)
- (Argentina) Gustavo Alfaro (20 Mar 2016 – 13 May 2017)
- (Argentina) Leandro Martini (interim) (13 May 2017 – 24 Jun 2017)
- (Argentina) Mariano Sosa (26 Jun 2017 – 28 Dec 2017)
- (Argentina) Facundo Sava (5 Jan 2018 – 21 Apr 2018)
- (Argentina) Darío Ortiz (interim) (22 Apr 2018 – 14 May 2018)
- (Argentina) Pedro Troglio (15 May 2018 – 17 Feb 2019)
- (Argentina) Darío Ortiz (18 Feb 2019 – 31 Aug 2019)
- (Argentina) Diego Maradona (Note: Maradona's assistant Sebastián Méndez acted as head coach in several matches he did not attend.) (5 Sep 2019 – 25 Nov 2020)
- (Argentina) Mariano Messera and (Argentina) Leandro Martini (26 Nov 2020 – 29 Aug 2021)
- (Argentina) Néstor Gorosito (31 Aug 2021 – 30 Dec 2022)
- (Argentina) Sebastián Romero (30 Dec 2022 – 2 Sep 2023)
- (Argentina) Leonardo Madelón (5 Sep 2023 – 14 Apr 2024)
- (Uruguay) Marcelo Méndez (19 Apr 2024 – 30 Jan 2025)
- (Argentina) Fernando Zaniratto (interim) (30 Jan 2025 – 10 Feb 2025)
- (Argentina) Diego Flores (10 Feb 2025 – 12 May 2025)
- (Uruguay) Alejandro Orfila (28 May 2025 – 13 Oct 2025)
- (Argentina) Fernando Zaniratto (interim) (14 Oct 2025 – 14 Dec 2025)
- (Argentina) Fernando Zaniratto (1 Jan 2026 – 6 Apr 2026)
- (Argentina) Ariel Pereyra (interim) (7 Apr 2026 –)

== Other sports ==
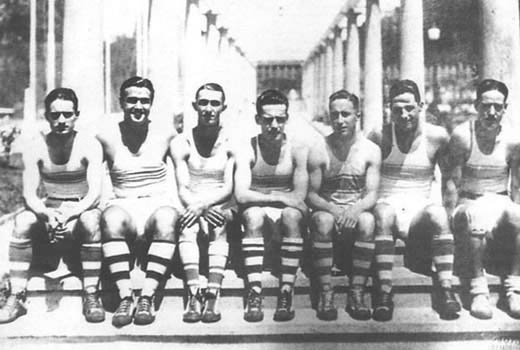
First basketball team of 1924

Basketball was practiced for the first time at the club in the 1920s. In 1924 the institution built a stadium on the corner of 60 and 118 streets. Since that time, it would become one of the major sports in the club.

The basketball team peaked during the 1978 and 1979 campaigns, when it won two Metropolitano championships. In both cases, team prevailed over favorite Obras Sanitarias, Argentina's powerhouse at the time. The team included players such as "Gallego" González, "Finito" Gehrmann, Peinado, as well as some Americans: Michael Jackson, Lawrence Jackson Jr., and the team leader and star, point-guard Clarence Edgar Metcalfe, chosen as the league MVP in 1979. The twice-champions were coached by Rolando Sfeir.

Gimnasia was also runner-up in the 2003–04 Liga Nacional de Básquetbol's Primera División tournament, when it was defeated by Boca Juniors by 4–2 in the final series.

In the following season, the team was relegated to the TNA (Second Division) after president Juan José Muñoz decreased substantially the basketball budget, thereby causing the loss of its principal players.

Some of Gimnasia's notable basketball players were Carlos "Gallego" González, Ernesto "Finito" Gehrmann, Roberto López, Carlos Bejarano and Mariano Cerutti among others. Likewise, club's notable coaches include José Ripullone, Miguel Ángel Ripullone and Gonzalo García.

Gimnasia y Esgrima also has a female volleyball team, who are the only one of the nine founder clubs from the Federación de Voleibol y Pelota al Cesto, still playing volleyball and in the highest division. The federation is current Federación Metropolitana de Voleibol (FMV).

=== Former sports ===
In addition to the aforementioned sport activities, Gimnasia y Esgrima La Plata participated in other disciplines throughout its history. The following sports are no longer practiced in the club:

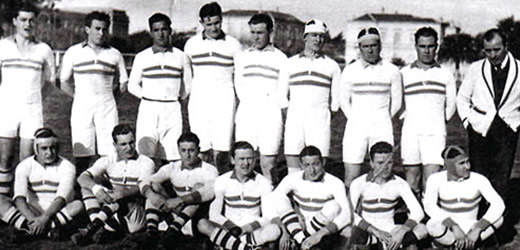
Rugby team of Club Gimnasia y Esgrima LP, predecessor to La Plata RC, posing in 1924

- Rugby union: In 1933, the "Unión de Rugby del Río de la Plata" (current Unión Argentina de Rugby) decided not to allow the affiliation of clubs that participated professionally in other sports (e.g., association football). As a result, the GELP rugby team was forced to rename itself distinctly as "Gimnasia y Esgrima La Plata Rugby Club". Four years later, however, it was decided to channel rugby activities through an independent institution, thereby creating "La Plata Rugby Club", which currently competes in the Torneo de la URBA, first division of the Unión de Rugby de Buenos Aires.
- Table tennis: The "Asociación Platense de Tenis de Mesa" ("La Plata Association for Table-tennis", part of the Argentine Federation of the sport) existed between 1945 and 1951. Gimnasia was a founding member of the Association, and it obtained the majority of the tournaments organized during these six years.
- Greco-Roman wrestling: Between 1924 and 1928 the club had a team of Greco-Roman wrestling.
- Gymnastics: During the 1930s, the practice of gymnastics played a central role in the club's activities. Members of the Gimnasia team were part of the Argentine delegation that competed in the 1936 Berlin Olympic Games. This discipline was discontinued after 1976.

Other activities were available at the club at various periods, namely: water polo, boxing, cycling, pétanque, auto racing and judo, among others.

== Honours ==
=== Senior titles ===
- Primera División (1): 1929
- Copa Centenario de la AFA (1): 1993
- Primera B (3): 1944, 1947, 1952
- División Intermedia (1): 1915
- Copa Bullrich (1): 1915 (Note: The Copa Bullrich was an official football competition contested by clubs playing in the Second Division. The AFA has not included this competition into the list of national cups because only teams in Primera División participated in those competitions.)

=== Friendly ===
- Trofeo Eva Perón (1): 1953
- Copa Gobernador Alende (1): 1960
- Copa Diario El Día (1): 1974
- Copa Diario La Gaceta (2): 1975, 1977
- Copa Amistad (1): 1977, 2006
- Copa Provincia de Buenos Aires (1): 1998
- Copa Municipalidad de La Plata (2): 1999, 2001
- Copa Malvinas Argentinas (1): 2003
- Copa Ciudad de Mar del Plata (1): 2009
- Copa Ciudad de Necochea (1): 2012
- Copa Amistad Ciudad de La Plata (1): 2014
- Copa Ciudad de Ensenada (1): 2016
- Copa Banco Provincia (1): 2017
- Copa de Verano Schneider (2): 2018, 2019

== Basketball honours ==
- Torneo Nacional de Ascenso (1): 2000–01
- Campeonato Argentino de Clubes (2): 1979, 1980
- Federación de Capital Federal's League (3): 1937, 1978, 1979, 1984, 1985
- Asociación Platense de Básquet (13): 1958, 1961, 1962, 1963, 1965, 1966, 1967, 1968, 1969, 1970, 1971, 1972, 1973
- Copa "Ismael Genaro Cerisola" (1): 1996

== Women's Volleyball honours ==
=== Official ===
- Argentine National League (3): 1999–00, 2000–01, 2002–03
- Federación Metropolitana (1): 2000
- Liga Metropolitana (1): 2004

=== Friendly ===
- Copa Morgan (1): 1951
- Torneos Evita (1): 1954
- Torneo Lola Berta (1): 1955
- Torneo Cuadrangular Chile (1): 1972, 1975
- Torneo Cuadrangular Náutico de Uruguay (1): 1976
- Torneo Norma Rimoldi (1): 2005

== See also ==
- History of Club de Gimnasia y Esgrima La Plata (Football)
- Gimnasia y Esgrima (basketball)
- Presidents of Club de Gimnasia y Esgrima La Plata
- Estadio Juan Carlos Zerillo
- La Plata derby

== Bibliography ==
- Gimnasia y Esgrima La Plata, 100 Años, by Carlos Asnaghi. Publisher: Editorial Ceyne (1988) – ISBN 978-950-9871-04-5
- Gimnasia: Historia de una Pasión, by Héctor Collivadino. Publisher: Editorial Deportiva Bonaerense y Diario El Día (2005) – ISBN 987-43-0446-4
- Asociación del Futbol Argentino: Cien Años con el Fútbol, by Beto Devoto. Publisher: Manrique Zago Ediciones (1993) – ISBN 978-950-9517-40-0
- 140 Años de Fútbol Argentino, by Diego Estévez. Publisher: Edición del Autor (2009) – ISBN 978-987-05-5872-9
- Yo, el Basurero, by Aníbal Guidi & Oscar Venturino. Publisher: Editorial Universitaria de La Plata (2005) – ISBN 978-987-595-012-2
- La Barrabrava: Fútbol y Política, by Gustavo Veiga. Publisher: Grupo Editorial Agora (1998) – ISBN 978-987-96235-3-4
