= 2021 Copa Libertadores final =

- Match programme cover
- Event: 2021 Copa Libertadores
Palmeiras	Flamengo
(Brazil)	(Brazil)
2	1
- After extra time
- Date: 27 November 2021
- Venue: Estadio Centenario, Montevideo
- Man of the Match: Deyverson (Palmeiras)
- Referee: Néstor Pitana (Argentina)
- Attendance: 55,023

The 2021 Copa Libertadores final was the final match which decided the winner of the 2021 Copa Libertadores. This was the 62nd edition of the Copa Libertadores, the top-tier South American continental club football tournament organized by CONMEBOL. The match was played on 27 November 2021 at the Estadio Centenario in Montevideo, Uruguay, between Brazilian sides Palmeiras and Flamengo.

Palmeiras defeated Flamengo by a 2–1 score after extra time in the final to win their third title in the tournament, and second in a row. As winners of the 2021 Copa Libertadores, they qualified for the 2021 FIFA Club World Cup and earned the right to play against the winners of the 2021 Copa Sudamericana in the 2022 Recopa Sudamericana. They also automatically qualified for the 2022 Copa Libertadores group stage.

== Venue ==
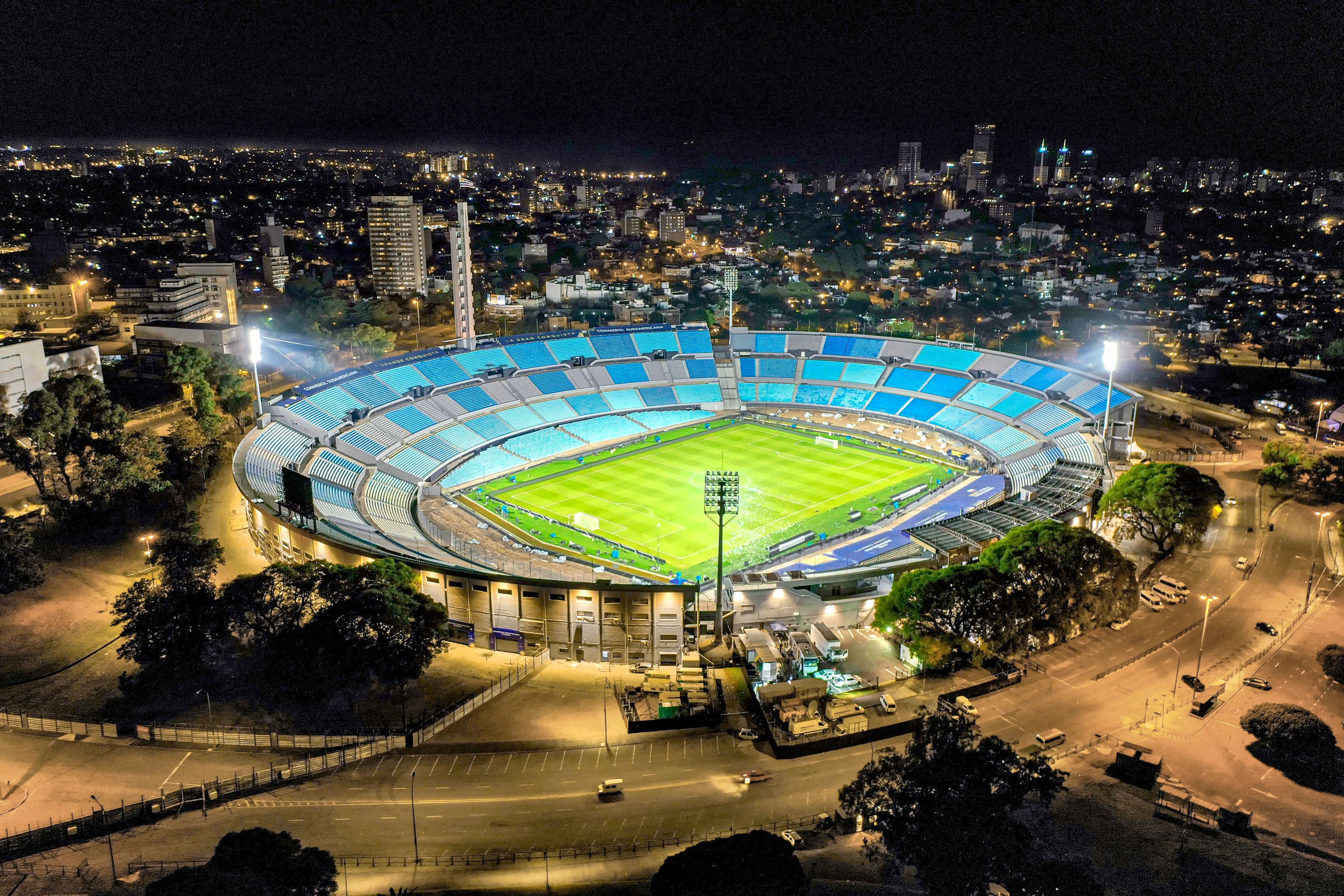
Estadio Centenario in Montevideo hosted the final

Bidding venues for the 2021 Copa Libertadores final
Association	Stadium	City	Capacity
Argentina	El Cilindro	Avellaneda	61,000
Argentina	Estadio Libertadores de América	Avellaneda	48,069
Argentina	Estadio Monumental Antonio Vespucio Liberti	Buenos Aires	70,074
Argentina	La Bombonera	Buenos Aires	54,000
Argentina	Estadio Mario Alberto Kempes	Córdoba	57,000
Brazil	Arena da Baixada	Curitiba	42,372
Brazil	Estádio Beira-Rio	Porto Alegre	50,128
Brazil	Estádio do Morumbi	São Paulo	67,052
Brazil	Arena Corinthians	São Paulo	49,205
Chile	Estadio Nacional Julio Martínez Prádanos	Santiago	58,665
Ecuador	Estadio Monumental Isidro Romero Carbo	Guayaquil	59,283
Uruguay	Estadio Centenario	Montevideo	60,235

On 13 May 2021, CONMEBOL announced that Estadio Centenario in Montevideo had been chosen as the venue for the 2021 final.

== Teams ==
Team	Previous finals appearances (bold indicates winners)
(Brazil) Palmeiras	5 (1961, 1968, **1999**, 2000, **2020**)
(Brazil) Flamengo	2 (**1981**, **2019**)

== Road to the final ==
Note: In all scores below, the score of the home team is given first.

(Brazil) Palmeiras			Round	(Brazil) Flamengo		
Opponent	Venue	Score		Opponent	Venue	Score
Bye			Qualifying stages	Bye		
**Group A**			Group stage	**Group G**		
(Peru) Universitario	Away	2–3	Group stage	(Argentina) Vélez Sarsfield	Away	2–3
(Ecuador) Independiente del Valle	Home	5–0	Group stage	(Chile) Unión La Calera	Home	4–1
(Argentina) Defensa y Justicia	Away	1–2	Group stage	(Ecuador) LDU Quito	Away	2–3
(Ecuador) Independiente del Valle	Away	0–1	Group stage	(Chile) Unión La Calera	Away	2–2
(Argentina) Defensa y Justicia	Home	3–4	Group stage	(Ecuador) LDU Quito	Home	2–2
(Peru) Universitario	Home	6–0	Group stage	(Argentina) Vélez Sarsfield	Home	0–0
Pos / Team / Pld / Pts; **1** / (Brazil) Palmeiras / **6** / **15**; 2 / (Argentina) Defensa y Justicia / 6 / **9**; 3 / (Ecuador) Independiente del Valle / 6 / **5**; 4 / (Peru) Universitario / 6 / **4**; Source: CONMEBOL			Group stage	Pos / Team / Pld / Pts; **1** / (Brazil) Flamengo / **6** / **12**; 2 / (Argentina) Vélez Sarsfield / 6 / **10**; 3 / (Ecuador) LDU Quito / 6 / **8**; 4 / (Chile) Unión La Calera / 6 / **2**; Source: CONMEBOL		
**Seed 2**			final stages	**Seed 5**		
(Chile) Universidad Católica (won 2–0 on aggregate)	Away	0–1	Round of 16	(Argentina) Defensa y Justicia (won 5–1 on aggregate)	Away	0–1
(Chile) Universidad Católica (won 2–0 on aggregate)	Home	1–0	Round of 16	(Argentina) Defensa y Justicia (won 5–1 on aggregate)	Home	4–1
(Brazil) São Paulo (won 4–1 on aggregate)	Away	1–1	Quarter-finals	(Paraguay) Olimpia (won 9–2 on aggregate)	Away	1–4
(Brazil) São Paulo (won 4–1 on aggregate)	Home	3–0	Quarter-finals	(Paraguay) Olimpia (won 9–2 on aggregate)	Home	5–1
(Brazil) Atlético Mineiro (tied 1–1 on aggregate, won on away goals)	Home	0–0	Semi-finals	(Ecuador) Barcelona (won 4–0 on aggregate)	Home	2–0
(Brazil) Atlético Mineiro (tied 1–1 on aggregate, won on away goals)	Away	1–1	Semi-finals	(Ecuador) Barcelona (won 4–0 on aggregate)	Away	0–2

== Match ==
Marcos Rocha (Palmeiras) and Léo Pereira (Flamengo) were ruled out of the final due to suspensions.

=== Details ===
27 November 2021
17:00 UTC−3

Palmeiras (Brazil)	2–1 (a.e.t.)	(Brazil) Flamengo
Veiga 5'; Deyverson 95'	Report	Gabriel Barbosa 72'

Estadio Centenario, Montevideo
Attendance: 55,023
Referee: Néstor Pitana (Argentina)

**Palmeiras**	**Flamengo**

GK	21	(Brazil) Weverton
RB	12	(Brazil) Mayke		(substituted off) 106'
CB	15	(Paraguay) Gustavo Gómez (c)	(yellow card) 74'
CB	13	(Brazil) Luan
LB	22	(Uruguay) Joaquín Piquerez	(yellow card) 67'	(substituted off) 113'
CM	28	(Brazil) Danilo		(substituted off) 70'
CM	8	(Brazil) Zé Rafael		(substituted off) 82'
RW	43	(Brazil) Dudu		(substituted off) 77'
AM	23	(Brazil) Raphael Veiga		(substituted off) 91'
LW	14	(Brazil) Gustavo Scarpa
CF	7	(Brazil) Rony
Substitutes:
GK	42	(Brazil) Jailson
DF	4	(Chile) Benjamín Kuscevic
DF	6	(Brazil) Jorge
MF	5	(Brazil) Patrick		(substituted on) 70'
MF	18	(Brazil) Danilo Barbosa		(substituted on) 82'
MF	25	(Brazil) Gabriel Menino		(substituted on) 106'
MF	30	(Brazil) Felipe Melo	(yellow card) 120+1'	(substituted on) 113'
FW	9	(Brazil) Deyverson		(substituted on) 91'
FW	10	(Brazil) Luiz Adriano
FW	11	(Brazil) Wesley		(substituted on) 77'
FW	19	(Brazil) Breno Lopes
FW	27	(Brazil) Gabriel Veron
Manager:
(Portugal) Abel Ferreira

GK	1	(Brazil) Diego Alves
RB	44	(Chile) Mauricio Isla		(substituted off) 79'
CB	3	(Brazil) Rodrigo Caio	(yellow card) 65'
CB	23	(Brazil) David Luiz
LB	16	(Brazil) Filipe Luís		(substituted off) 32'
CM	5	(Brazil) Willian Arão
CM	18	(Brazil) Andreas Pereira		(substituted off) 111'
RW	7	(Brazil) Éverton Ribeiro (c)		(substituted off) 63'
AM	14	(Uruguay) Giorgian de Arrascaeta	(yellow card) 78'	(substituted off) 111'
LW	27	(Brazil) Bruno Henrique		(substituted off) 91'
CF	9	(Brazil) Gabriel Barbosa	(yellow card) 74'
Substitutes:
GK	45	(Brazil) Hugo Souza
DF	2	(Brazil) Gustavo Henrique
DF	6	(Brazil) Renê		(substituted on) 32'
DF	29	(Brazil) Rodinei
DF	30	(Brazil) Bruno Viana
DF	34	(Brazil) Matheuzinho		(substituted on) 79'
MF	10	(Brazil) Diego
MF	33	(Brazil) Thiago Maia
FW	11	(Brazil) Vitinho		(substituted on) 111'
FW	19	(Brazil) Michael		(substituted on) 63'
FW	21	(Brazil) Pedro		(substituted on) 111'
FW	43	(Brazil) Kenedy		(substituted on) 91'
Manager:
(Brazil) Renato Gaúcho

Man of the Match:
Deyverson (Palmeiras)

Assistant referees:
Juan Belatti (Argentina)
Gabriel Chade (Argentina)
Fourth official:
Jesús Valenzuela (Venezuela)
Fifth official:
Maximiliano del Yesso (Argentina)
Video assistant referee:
Julio Bascuñán (Chile)
Assistant video assistant referees:
Germán Delfino (Argentina)
Alexander Guzmán (Colombia)
Jhon Alexander Ospina (Colombia)

**Match rules**

- 90 minutes.
- 30 minutes of extra time if necessary.
- Penalty shoot-out if scores still level.
- Twelve named substitutes.
- Maximum of five substitutions, with a sixth allowed in extra time.

== See also ==
- 2021 Copa Sudamericana final
- 2022 Recopa Sudamericana
