= 2021 Copa Libertadores =

62nd season of Copa Libertadores

Copa CONMEBOL Libertadores 2021
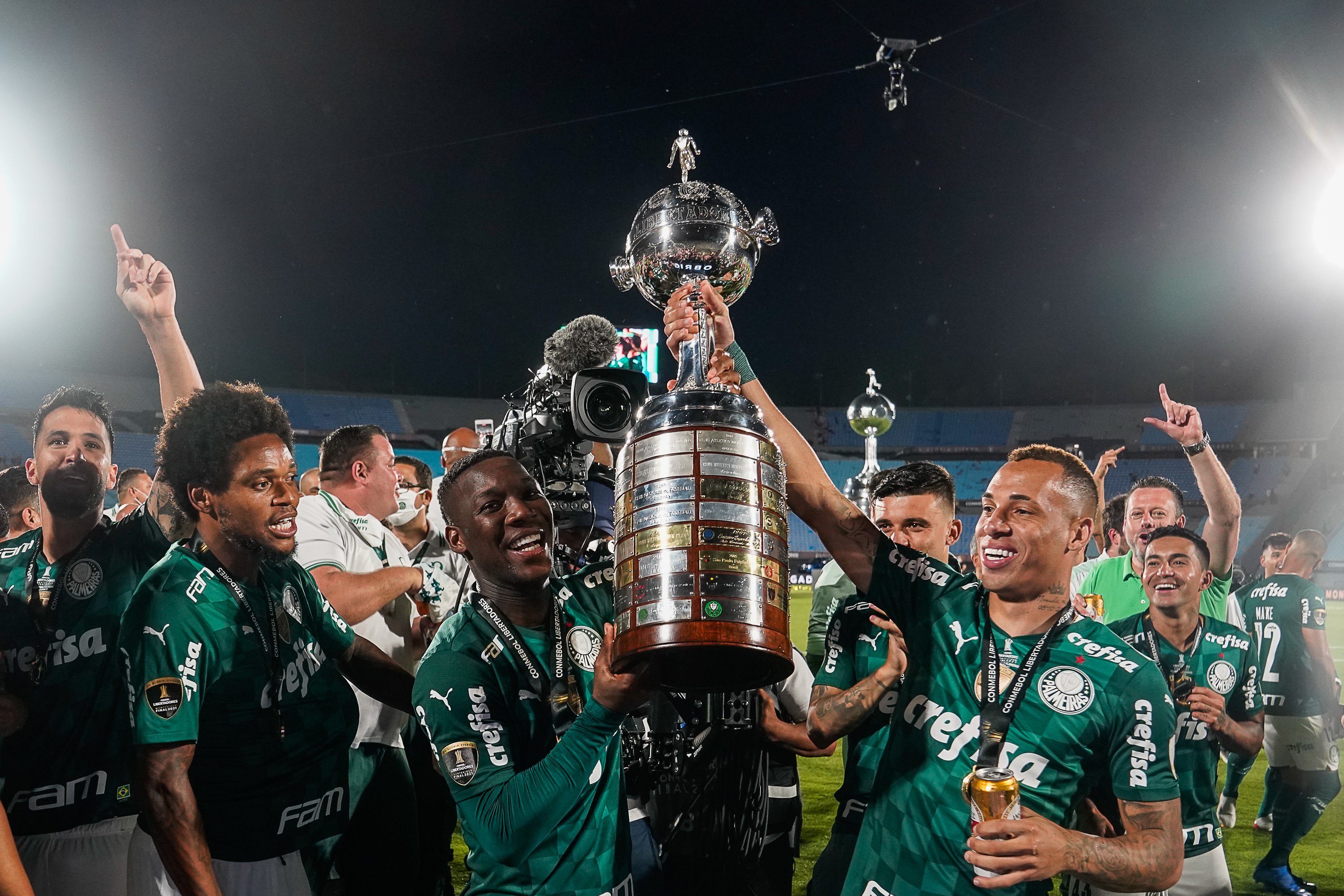
- Palmeiras, champions.

Tournament details
- Dates: 23 February – 27 November 2021
- Teams: 47 (from 10 associations)

Final positions
- Champions: (Brazil) Palmeiras (3rd title)
- Runners-up: (Brazil) Flamengo

Tournament statistics
- Matches played: 155
- Goals scored: 423 (2.73 per match)
- Top scorer: (Brazil) Gabriel Barbosa (11 goals)
- Best player: (Brazil) Gabriel Barbosa

The 2021 Copa CONMEBOL Libertadores was the 62nd edition of the CONMEBOL Libertadores (also referred to as the Copa Libertadores), South America's premier club football tournament organized by CONMEBOL.

Starting from this season, teams must be in the top division of their member association to play in South American club competitions, except for teams which are champions of the qualifying tournaments or cups.

On 14 May 2020, CONMEBOL announced the candidate venues for the 2021, 2022 and 2023 club competition finals. On 13 May 2021, CONMEBOL announced that the final would be played at the Estadio Centenario in Montevideo, Uruguay on 20 November 2021, but on 27 July 2021 the final was eventually confirmed to have been rescheduled to 27 November 2021.

Defending champions Palmeiras won their third Copa Libertadores title after beating fellow Brazilian club Flamengo by a 2–1 score after extra time in the final match. As winners of the 2021 Copa Libertadores, Palmeiras qualified for the 2021 FIFA Club World Cup, and earned the right to play against the winners of the 2021 Copa Sudamericana in the 2022 Recopa Sudamericana. They also automatically qualified for the 2022 Copa Libertadores group stage.

== Teams ==
The following 47 teams from the 10 CONMEBOL member associations qualified for the tournament:

- Copa Libertadores champions
- Copa Sudamericana champions
- Brazil: 7 berths
- Argentina: 6 berths
- All other associations: 4 berths each

The entry stage was determined as follows:

- Group stage: 28 teams
  - Copa Libertadores champions
  - Copa Sudamericana champions
  - Teams which qualified for berths 1–5 from Argentina and Brazil
  - Teams which qualified for berths 1–2 from all other associations
- Second stage: 13 teams
  - Teams which qualified for berths 6–7 from Brazil
  - Team which qualified for berth 6 from Argentina
  - Teams which qualified for berths 3–4 from Chile and Colombia
  - Teams which qualified for berth 3 from all other associations
- First stage: 6 teams
  - Teams which qualified for berth 4 from Bolivia, Ecuador, Paraguay, Peru, Uruguay and Venezuela

Association	Team (Berth)	Entry stage	Qualification method
Argentina (6 + 1 berths)	Defensa y Justicia (Argentina 1, Copa Sudamericana)	Group stage	2020 Copa Sudamericana champions
Argentina (6 + 1 berths)	Boca Juniors (Argentina 2)	Group stage	2019–20 Superliga Argentina and 2020 Copa de la Liga Profesional champions
Argentina (6 + 1 berths)	River Plate (Argentina 3)	Group stage	2019–20 Superliga Argentina and 2020 Copa de la Superliga aggregate table best team not yet qualified
Argentina (6 + 1 berths)	Racing (Argentina 4)	Group stage	2019–20 Superliga Argentina and 2020 Copa de la Superliga aggregate table 2nd best team not yet qualified
Argentina (6 + 1 berths)	Argentinos Juniors (Argentina 5)	Group stage	2019–20 Superliga Argentina and 2020 Copa de la Superliga aggregate table 3rd best team not yet qualified
Argentina (6 + 1 berths)	Vélez Sarsfield (Argentina 6)	Group stage	2019–20 Superliga Argentina and 2020 Copa de la Superliga aggregate table 4th best team not yet qualified
Argentina (6 + 1 berths)	San Lorenzo (Argentina 7)	Second stage	2019–20 Superliga Argentina and 2020 Copa de la Superliga aggregate table 5th best team not yet qualified
Bolivia (4 berths)	Always Ready (Bolivia 1)	Group stage	2020 Apertura champions
Bolivia (4 berths)	The Strongest (Bolivia 2)	Group stage	2020 Apertura runners-up
Bolivia (4 berths)	Bolívar (Bolivia 3)	Second stage	2020 Apertura 3rd place
Bolivia (4 berths)	Royal Pari (Bolivia 4)	First stage	2020 Apertura 4th place
Brazil (7 + 1 berths)	Palmeiras (Brazil 1, Title holders)	Group stage	2020 Copa Libertadores champions
Brazil (7 + 1 berths)	Flamengo (Brazil 2)	Group stage	2020 Campeonato Brasileiro Série A champions
Brazil (7 + 1 berths)	Internacional (Brazil 3)	Group stage	2020 Campeonato Brasileiro Série A runners-up
Brazil (7 + 1 berths)	Atlético Mineiro (Brazil 4)	Group stage	2020 Campeonato Brasileiro Série A 3rd place
Brazil (7 + 1 berths)	São Paulo (Brazil 5)	Group stage	2020 Campeonato Brasileiro Série A 4th place
Brazil (7 + 1 berths)	Fluminense (Brazil 6)	Group stage	2020 Campeonato Brasileiro Série A 5th place
Brazil (7 + 1 berths)	Grêmio (Brazil 7)	Second stage	2020 Campeonato Brasileiro Série A 6th place
Brazil (7 + 1 berths)	Santos (Brazil 8)	Second stage	2020 Campeonato Brasileiro Série A 8th place
Chile (4 berths)	Universidad Católica (Chile 1)	Group stage	2020 Primera División champions
Chile (4 berths)	Unión La Calera (Chile 2)	Group stage	2020 Primera División runners-up
Chile (4 berths)	Universidad de Chile (Chile 3)	Second stage	2020 Primera División 3rd place
Chile (4 berths)	Unión Española (Chile 4)	Second stage	2020 Primera División 4th place
Colombia (4 berths)	América de Cali (Colombia 1)	Group stage	2020 Primera A champions
Colombia (4 berths)	Santa Fe (Colombia 2)	Group stage	2020 Primera A runners-up
Colombia (4 berths)	Junior (Colombia 3)	Second stage	2020 Primera A aggregate table best team not yet qualified
Colombia (4 berths)	Atlético Nacional (Colombia 4)	Second stage	2020 Primera A aggregate table 2nd best team not yet qualified
Ecuador (4 berths)	Barcelona (Ecuador 1)	Group stage	2020 Serie A champions
Ecuador (4 berths)	LDU Quito (Ecuador 2)	Group stage	2020 Serie A runners-up
Ecuador (4 berths)	Independiente del Valle (Ecuador 3)	Second stage	2020 Serie A aggregate table best team not yet qualified
Ecuador (4 berths)	Universidad Católica (Ecuador 4)	First stage	2020 Serie A aggregate table 2nd best team not yet qualified
Paraguay (4 berths)	Cerro Porteño (Paraguay 1)	Group stage	2020 Primera División tournament (Apertura or Clausura) champions with better record in aggregate table
Paraguay (4 berths)	Olimpia (Paraguay 2)	Group stage	2020 Primera División tournament (Apertura or Clausura) champions with worse record in aggregate table
Paraguay (4 berths)	Libertad (Paraguay 3)	Second stage	2020 Primera División aggregate table best team not yet qualified
Paraguay (4 berths)	Guaraní (Paraguay 4)	First stage	2020 Primera División aggregate table 2nd best team not yet qualified
Peru (4 berths)	Sporting Cristal (Peru 1)	Group stage	2020 Liga 1 champions
Peru (4 berths)	Universitario (Peru 2)	Group stage	2020 Liga 1 runners-up
Peru (4 berths)	Ayacucho (Peru 3)	Second stage	2020 Liga 1 3rd place
Peru (4 berths)	Universidad César Vallejo (Peru 4)	First stage	2020 Liga 1 aggregate table best team not yet qualified
Uruguay (4 berths)	Nacional (Uruguay 1)	Group stage	2020 Primera División champions
Uruguay (4 berths)	Rentistas (Uruguay 2)	Group stage	2020 Primera División runners-up
Uruguay (4 berths)	Montevideo Wanderers (Uruguay 3)	Second stage	2020 Primera División aggregate table 5th place as of 21 February 2021
Uruguay (4 berths)	Liverpool (Uruguay 4)	First stage	2020 Primera División aggregate table 5th place as of 7 February 2021
Venezuela (4 berths)	Deportivo La Guaira (Venezuela 1)	Group stage	2020 Primera División champions
Venezuela (4 berths)	Deportivo Táchira (Venezuela 2)	Group stage	2020 Primera División runners-up
Venezuela (4 berths)	Deportivo Lara (Venezuela 3)	Second stage	2020 Primera División 3rd place
Venezuela (4 berths)	Caracas (Venezuela 4)	First stage	2020 Primera División 4th place

Notes

1. Argentina (ARG):
  - On 28 April 2020, the Argentine Football Association announced the abandonment of the 2020 Copa de la Superliga and the culmination of the 2019–20 season due to the COVID-19 pandemic in Argentina. The six Argentina berths of the 2021 Copa Libertadores were awarded to the following:
    - The Argentina 1 berth was awarded to the 2019–20 Superliga Argentina champions.
    - The Argentina 2 berth, originally awarded to the 2020 Copa de la Superliga champions, was awarded to the winner of a tournament to be played in the second semester of 2020, later confirmed to be the 2020 Copa de la Liga Profesional.
    - The Argentina 3 berth was awarded to the 2019–20 Copa Argentina champions, provided that government directives allowed for it to be concluded.
    - The Argentina 4, Argentina 5, and Argentina 6 berths were awarded to the three best teams of the 2019–20 Superliga Argentina and 2020 Copa de la Superliga aggregate table at the time of the suspension of the latter competition not yet qualified.
  - On 11 December 2020 it was confirmed that the 2019–20 Copa Argentina would not be completed in time to award its winner a berth into the 2021 Copa Libertadores, therefore the Argentina 3 berth was reallocated to the best team of the 2019–20 Superliga Argentina and 2020 Copa de la Superliga aggregate table not yet qualified.
2. Bolivia (BOL): The 2020 Clausura tournament was not held due to the COVID-19 pandemic in Bolivia, therefore the Bolivia 2, Bolivia 3, and Bolivia 4 berths of the 2021 Copa Libertadores were reallocated to the 2020 Apertura runners-up, third and fourth-placed teams, respectively.
3. Chile (CHI): On 30 December 2020, the Council of Presidents of the ANFP decided that the Chile 4 berth, originally awarded to the 2020 Copa Chile champions, would be awarded to the fourth-placed team of the 2020 Chilean Primera División, given that the 2020 Copa Chile would not be held before the start of the 2021 Copa Libertadores.
4. Colombia (COL):
  - On 25 July 2020, DIMAYOR decided that the 2020 Categoría Primera A season, suspended from 13 March due to the COVID-19 pandemic in Colombia, would only have a single tournament played for the remainder of the season. Therefore, the Colombia 1 berth of the 2021 Copa Libertadores, originally awarded to the 2020 Apertura champions, and the Colombia 2 berth, originally awarded to the 2020 Finalización champions, would instead be awarded to the champions and runners-up of that single tournament, respectively.
  - On 9 September 2020, DIMAYOR confirmed the reallocation of the four Colombia berths of the 2021 Copa Libertadores as follows:
    - The Colombia 1 berth was awarded to the 2020 Primera A champions.
    - The Colombia 2 berth was awarded to the 2020 Primera A runners-up.
    - The Colombia 3 berth was awarded to the 2020 Primera A aggregate table best team not yet qualified.
    - The Colombia 4 berth, originally awarded to the 2020 Copa Colombia champions, was awarded to the 2020 Primera A aggregate table 2nd best team not yet qualified.
5. Uruguay (URU): Given that the 2020 Primera División was not concluded before the start of the 2021 Copa Libertadores qualifying stages due to the COVID-19 pandemic in Uruguay, on 14 January 2021 the League Council of the Uruguayan Football Association approved a temporary modification to the qualification method of Uruguayan teams. Since associations had to formally inform CONMEBOL of the teams that would take part in international competition ahead of the start of competition, some international berths were decided based on deadlines set according to the dates the respective Copa Libertadores rounds were scheduled for as well as the placements of teams in the 2020 Primera División aggregate table at the time of those deadlines:
  - The Uruguay 4 berth was awarded to the best eligible team of the 2020 Primera División aggregate table as of 7 February 2021, considering that the Copa Libertadores first stage was scheduled to begin on 23 February 2021. Liverpool (2020 Primera División aggregate table fifth place as of 7 February 2021) accepted the berth after the top four of the aggregate table at that moment (Nacional, Montevideo City Torque, Peñarol, and Rentistas) all declined to take the berth.
  - The Uruguay 3 berth was awarded to the best eligible team of the 2020 Primera División aggregate table as of 21 February 2021, considering that the Copa Libertadores second stage was scheduled to begin on 9 March 2021. Montevideo Wanderers (2020 Primera División aggregate table fifth place as of 21 February 2021) accepted the berth after the top three of the aggregate table at that moment (Nacional, Montevideo City Torque, and Peñarol) all declined to take the berth, and fourth-placed Liverpool was already qualified as Uruguay 4.
  - Teams were offered the chance to accept or decline the berths they were eligible for at the time of the respective deadlines.
6. Venezuela (VEN): On 15 May 2020, the Venezuelan Football Federation decided the permanent suspension of the 2020 Venezuelan Primera División season and the voiding of the standings and results recorded due to the COVID-19 pandemic in Venezuela. The allocation of the four Venezuela berths of the 2021 Copa Libertadores would be announced at a later time, with the FVF confirming a will to organize a new tournament in which sporting merit, club licensing requirements, and medical protocols were applied. The definitive berth allocations were confirmed by the FVF on 18 September 2020.

== Schedule ==
The schedule of the competition was as follows:

On 4 February 2021, CONMEBOL announced a rescheduling for the qualifying stages.

Stage	Draw date	First leg	Second leg
First stage	5 February 2021	23–24 February 2021 (originally 16–18 February 2021)	2–3 March 2021 (originally 23–25 February 2021)
Second stage	5 February 2021	9–11 March 2021 (originally 2–4 March 2021)	16–18 March 2021 (originally 9–11 March 2021)
Third stage	5 February 2021	6–9 April 2021 (originally 16–18 March 2021)	13–15 April 2021 (originally 6–8 April 2021)
Group stage	9 April 2021	Matchday 1: 20–22 April 2021; Matchday 2: 27–29 April 2021; Matchday 3: 4–6 May 2021; Matchday 4: 11–13 May 2021; Matchday 5: 18–20 May 2021; Matchday 6: 25–27 May 2021	
Round of 16	1 June 2021	13–15 July 2021	20–22 July and 3 August 2021 (originally 20–22 July 2021)
Quarter-finals	1 June 2021	10–12 August 2021	17–19 August 2021
Semi-finals	1 June 2021	21–22 September 2021	28–29 September 2021
Final	1 June 2021	27 November 2021 at Estadio Centenario, Montevideo	

== Draws ==
Location of teams of the 2021 Copa Libertadores.
Brown: Group A; Red: Group B; Orange: Group C;
Yellow: Group D; Green: Group E; Blue: Group F;
Purple: Group G; Pink: Group H; White: Play-off rounds.

The draw for the qualifying stages was held on 5 February 2021, 12:00 PYST (UTC−3), at the CONMEBOL Convention Centre in Luque, Paraguay.

Teams were seeded by their CONMEBOL Clubs ranking as of 1 February 2021 (shown in parentheses), taking into account the following three factors:

1. Performance in the last 10 years, taking into account Copa Libertadores and Copa Sudamericana results in the period 2011–2020.
2. Historical coefficient, taking into account Copa Libertadores and Copa Sudamericana results in the period 1960–2010 and 2002-2010 respectively.
3. Local tournament champion, with bonus points awarded to domestic league champions of the last 10 years

For the first stage, the six teams were drawn into three ties (E1–E3), with the teams from Pot 1 hosting the second leg.

First stage draw
Pot 1	Pot 2
(Paraguay) Guaraní (34); (Venezuela) Caracas (58); (Ecuador) Universidad Católica (112)	(Peru) Universidad César Vallejo (130); (Bolivia) Royal Pari (164); (Uruguay) Liverpool (165)

Notes

1. ^{URU} The identity of the team Uruguay 4 was not known at the time of the draw, and was seeded in Pot 2.

For the second stage, the 16 teams were drawn into eight ties (C1–C8), with the teams from Pot 1 hosting the second leg. Teams from the same association could not be drawn into the same tie, excluding the three winners of the first stage, which were seeded in Pot 2 and whose identity was not known at the time of the draw, and could be drawn into the same tie with another team from the same association.

Second stage draw
Pot 1	Pot 2
(Colombia) Atlético Nacional (7); (Paraguay) Libertad (14); (Argentina) San Lorenzo (15); (Ecuador) Independiente del Valle (20); (Colombia) Junior (27); (Bolivia) Bolívar (29); (Venezuela) Deportivo Lara (75); (Peru) Ayacucho (222)	(Brazil) Grêmio (3); (Brazil) Santos (9); Universidad de Chile (41); (Chile) Unión Española (61); (Uruguay) Montevideo Wanderers (76); First stage winner E1; First stage winner E2; First stage winner E3

Notes

1. ^{BRA} The identity of the teams Brazil 7 and Brazil 8 was not known at the time of the draw, and were seeded in Pot 2.
2. ^{CHI} The identity of the teams Chile 3 and Chile 4 was not known at the time of the draw, and were seeded in Pot 2.
3. ^{URU} The identity of the team Uruguay 3 was not known at the time of the draw, and was seeded in Pot 2.

For the third stage, the eight winners of the second stage were allocated without any draw into the following four ties (G1–G4), with the team in each tie with the higher CONMEBOL ranking hosting the second leg. As their identity was not known at the time of the draw, they could be drawn into the same tie with another team from the same association.

- Second stage winner C1 vs. Second stage winner C8
- Second stage winner C2 vs. Second stage winner C7
- Second stage winner C3 vs. Second stage winner C6
- Second stage winner C4 vs. Second stage winner C5

The draw for the group stage was held on 9 April 2021, 12:00 PYT (UTC−4), at the CONMEBOL Convention Centre in Luque, Paraguay. For the group stage, the 32 teams were drawn into eight groups (Groups A–H) of four containing a team from each of the four pots. Teams from the same association could not be drawn into the same group, excluding the four winners of the third stage, which were seeded in Pot 4 and whose identity was not known at the time of the draw, and could be drawn into the same group with another team from the same association.

Group stage draw
Pot 1	Pot 2	Pot 3	Pot 4
(Brazil) Palmeiras (4); (Argentina) River Plate (1); (Argentina) Boca Juniors (2); (Uruguay) Nacional (5); (Brazil) Flamengo (6); (Paraguay) Cerro Porteño (11); (Paraguay) Olimpia (12); (Brazil) São Paulo (13)	(Argentina) Defensa y Justicia (37); (Brazil) Internacional (18); (Brazil) Atlético Mineiro (19); (Colombia) Santa Fe (21); (Argentina) Racing (22); (Ecuador) LDU Quito (26); (Chile) Universidad Católica (30); (Ecuador) Barcelona (31)	(Argentina) Vélez Sarsfield (33); (Peru) Sporting Cristal (35); (Colombia) América de Cali (36); (Brazil) Fluminense (39); (Bolivia) The Strongest (40); (Peru) Universitario (46); (Venezuela) Deportivo Táchira (60); (Argentina) Argentinos Juniors (81)	(Venezuela) Deportivo La Guaira (127); (Chile) Unión La Calera (128); (Bolivia) Always Ready (145); (Uruguay) Rentistas (250); Third stage winner G1; Third stage winner G2; Third stage winner G3; Third stage winner G4

Notes

1. ^{TH} The defending Copa Libertadores champions were seeded in Pot 1 and automatically allocated to Group A.
2. ^{CS} The defending Copa Sudamericana champions were seeded in Pot 2.

The draw for the round of 16 was held on 1 June 2021, 12:00 PYT (UTC−4), at the CONMEBOL Convention Center in Luque, Paraguay. For the round of 16, the 16 teams were drawn into eight ties (A–H) between a group winner (Pot 1) and a group runner-up (Pot 2), with the group winners hosting the second leg. Teams from the same association or the same group could be drawn into the same tie (Regulations Article 2.2.3.2).

== Qualifying stages ==
In the qualifying stages, each tie was played on a home-and-away two-legged basis. If tied on aggregate, the away goals rule was used. If still tied, extra time was not played, and a penalty shoot-out was used to determine the winner (Regulations Article 2.4.3). The qualifying stages were structured as follows:

- First stage (6 teams): The three winners of the first stage advanced to the second stage to join the 13 teams which were given byes to the second stage.
- Second stage (16 teams): The eight winners of the second stage advanced to the third stage.
- Third stage (8 teams): The four winners of the third stage advanced to the group stage to join the 28 direct entrants. The four teams eliminated in the third stage entered the Copa Sudamericana group stage.

=== First stage ===
Team 1	Agg.	Team 2	1st leg	2nd leg
Liverpool (Uruguay)	2–4	(Ecuador) Universidad Católica	2–1	0–3
Universidad César Vallejo (Peru)	0–2	(Venezuela) Caracas	0–0	0–2
Royal Pari (Bolivia)	2–5	(Paraguay) Guaraní	1–4	1–1

=== Second stage ===
Team 1	Agg.	Team 2	1st leg	2nd leg
Universidad Católica (Ecuador)	2–3	(Paraguay) Libertad	0–1	2–2
Grêmio (Brazil)	8–2	(Peru) Ayacucho	6–1	2–1
Montevideo Wanderers (Uruguay)	1–5	(Bolivia) Bolívar	1–0	0–5
Universidad de Chile	1–3	(Argentina) San Lorenzo	1–1	0–2
Santos (Brazil)	3–2	(Venezuela) Deportivo Lara	2–1	1–1
Caracas (Venezuela)	2–5	(Colombia) Junior	1–2	1–3
Unión Española (Chile)	3–6	(Ecuador) Independiente del Valle	1–0	2–6
Guaraní (Paraguay)	0–5	(Colombia) Atlético Nacional	0–2	0–3

=== Third stage ===
Team 1	Agg.	Team 2	1st leg	2nd leg
Libertad (Paraguay)	2–4	(Colombia) Atlético Nacional	1–0	1–4
Independiente del Valle (Ecuador)	4–2	(Brazil) Grêmio	2–1	2–1
Bolívar (Bolivia)	2–4	(Colombia) Junior	2–1	0–3
San Lorenzo (Argentina)	3–5	(Brazil) Santos	1–3	2–2

== Group stage ==
In the group stage, each group is played on a home-and-away round-robin basis. The teams are ranked according to the following criteria: 1. Points (3 points for a win, 1 point for a draw, and 0 points for a loss); 2. Goal difference; 3. Goals scored; 4. Away goals scored; 5. CONMEBOL ranking (Regulations Article 2.4.2).

The winners and runners-up of each group advanced to the round of 16 of the final stages. The third-placed teams of each group entered the round of 16 of the 2021 Copa Sudamericana.

=== Group A ===
Pos	Team	Pld	W	D	L	GF	GA	GD	Pts	Qualification	PAL	DYJ	IDV	UNI
1	(Brazil) Palmeiras	6	5	0	1	20	7	+13	15	Round of 16	—	3–4	5–0	6–0
2	(Argentina) Defensa y Justicia	6	2	3	1	11	8	+3	9	Round of 16	1–2	—	1–1	3–0
3	(Ecuador) Independiente del Valle	6	1	2	3	8	11	−3	5	Copa Sudamericana	0–1	1–1	—	4–0
4	(Peru) Universitario	6	1	1	4	6	19	−13	4		2–3	1–1	3–2	—

Source: CONMEBOL

=== Group B ===
Pos	Team	Pld	W	D	L	GF	GA	GD	Pts	Qualification	INT	OLI	TAC	CAR
1	(Brazil) Internacional	6	3	1	2	12	5	+7	10	Round of 16	—	6–1	4–0	0–0
2	(Paraguay) Olimpia	6	3	0	3	13	14	−1	9	Round of 16	0–1	—	6–2	2–1
3	(Venezuela) Deportivo Táchira	6	3	0	3	14	17	−3	9	Copa Sudamericana	2–1	3–2	—	7–2
4	(Bolivia) Always Ready	6	2	1	3	8	11	−3	7		2–0	1–2	2–0	—

Source: CONMEBOL

=== Group C ===
Pos	Team	Pld	W	D	L	GF	GA	GD	Pts	Qualification	BSC	BOC	SAN	STR
1	(Ecuador) Barcelona	6	4	1	1	10	3	+7	13	Round of 16	—	1–0	3–1	4–0
2	(Argentina) Boca Juniors	6	3	1	2	6	2	+4	10	Round of 16	0–0	—	2–0	3–0
3	(Brazil) Santos	6	2	0	4	8	9	−1	6	Copa Sudamericana	0–2	1–0	—	5–0
4	(Bolivia) The Strongest	6	2	0	4	4	14	−10	6		2–0	0–1	2–1	—

Source: CONMEBOL

=== Group D ===
Pos	Team	Pld	W	D	L	GF	GA	GD	Pts	Qualification	FLU	RIV	JUN	SFE
1	(Brazil) Fluminense	6	3	2	1	10	7	+3	11	Round of 16	—	1–1	1–2	2–1
2	(Argentina) River Plate	6	2	3	1	7	7	0	9	Round of 16	1–3	—	2–1	2–1
3	(Colombia) Junior	6	1	4	1	6	6	0	7	Copa Sudamericana	1–1	1–1	—	1–1
4	(Colombia) Santa Fe	6	0	3	3	4	7	−3	3		1–2	0–0	0–0	—

Source: CONMEBOL

=== Group E ===
Pos	Team	Pld	W	D	L	GF	GA	GD	Pts	Qualification	RAC	SPA	CRI	REN
1	(Argentina) Racing	6	4	2	0	9	2	+7	14	Round of 16	—	0–0	2–1	3–0
2	(Brazil) São Paulo	6	3	2	1	9	2	+7	11	Round of 16	0–1	—	3–0	2–0
3	(Peru) Sporting Cristal	6	1	1	4	3	10	−7	4	Copa Sudamericana	0–2	0–3	—	2–0
4	(Uruguay) Rentistas	6	0	3	3	2	9	−7	3		1–1	1–1	0–0	—

Source: CONMEBOL

=== Group F ===
Pos	Team	Pld	W	D	L	GF	GA	GD	Pts	Qualification	ARG	UCA	NAC	ATN
1	(Argentina) Argentinos Juniors	6	4	0	2	7	3	+4	12	Round of 16	—	0–1	2–0	1–0
2	(Chile) Universidad Católica	6	3	0	3	6	6	0	9	Round of 16	0–2	—	3–1	2–0
3	(Uruguay) Nacional	6	2	2	2	8	9	−1	8	Copa Sudamericana	2–0	1–0	—	4–4
4	(Colombia) Atlético Nacional	6	1	2	3	6	9	−3	5		0–2	2–0	0–0	—

Source: CONMEBOL

=== Group G ===
Pos	Team	Pld	W	D	L	GF	GA	GD	Pts	Qualification	FLA	VEL	LDQ	ULC
1	(Brazil) Flamengo	6	3	3	0	14	9	+5	12	Round of 16	—	0–0	2–2	4–1
2	(Argentina) Vélez Sarsfield	6	3	1	2	10	8	+2	10	Round of 16	2–3	—	3–1	2–1
3	(Ecuador) LDU Quito	6	2	2	2	15	13	+2	8	Copa Sudamericana	2–3	3–1	—	5–2
4	(Chile) Unión La Calera	6	0	2	4	8	17	−9	2		2–2	0–2	2–2	—

Source: CONMEBOL

=== Group H ===
Pos	Team	Pld	W	D	L	GF	GA	GD	Pts	Qualification	CAM	CCP	AME	DLG
1	(Brazil) Atlético Mineiro	6	5	1	0	15	3	+12	16	Round of 16	—	4–0	2–1	4–0
2	(Paraguay) Cerro Porteño	6	3	1	2	4	5	−1	10	Round of 16	0–1	—	1–0	0–0
3	(Colombia) América de Cali	6	1	1	4	5	9	−4	4	Copa Sudamericana	1–3	0–2	—	3–1
4	(Venezuela) Deportivo La Guaira	6	0	3	3	2	9	−7	3		1–1	0–1	0–0	—

Source: CONMEBOL

== Final stages ==
Starting from the round of 16, the teams played a single-elimination tournament with the following rules:

- In the round of 16, quarter-finals and semi-finals, each tie was played on a home-and-away two-legged basis, with the higher-seeded team hosting the second leg (Regulations Article 2.2.3.2). If tied on aggregate, the away goals rule was used. If still tied, extra time was not played, and a penalty shoot-out was used to determine the winners (Regulations Article 2.4.3).
- The final was played as a single match at a venue pre-selected by CONMEBOL, with the higher-seeded team designated as the "home" team for administrative purposes (Regulations Article 2.2.3.5). If tied after regulation, 30 minutes of extra time were played. If still tied after extra time, a penalty shoot-out was used to determine the winners (Regulations Article 2.4.4).

=== Qualified teams ===
The winners and runners-up of each of the eight groups in the group stage advanced to the round of 16.

Group	Winners	Runners-up
A	(Brazilian Football Confederation) Palmeiras	(Argentine Football Association) Defensa y Justicia
B	(Brazilian Football Confederation) Internacional	(Paraguayan Football Association) Olimpia
C	(Ecuadorian Football Federation) Barcelona	(Argentine Football Association) Boca Juniors
D	(Brazilian Football Confederation) Fluminense	(Argentine Football Association) River Plate
E	(Argentine Football Association) Racing	(Brazilian Football Confederation) São Paulo
F	(Argentine Football Association) Argentinos Juniors	(Football Federation of Chile) Universidad Católica
G	(Brazilian Football Confederation) Flamengo	(Argentine Football Association) Vélez Sarsfield
H	(Brazilian Football Confederation) Atlético Mineiro	(Paraguayan Football Association) Cerro Porteño

=== Seeding ===
Starting from the round of 16, the teams are seeded according to their results in the group stage, with the group winners (Pot 1) seeded 1–8, and the group runners-up (Pot 2) seeded 9–16.

Seed	Grp	Team	Pld	W	D	L	GF	GA	GD	Pts	Round of 16 draw
1	H	(Brazilian Football Confederation) Atlético Mineiro	6	5	1	0	15	3	+12	16	Pot 1
2	A	(Brazilian Football Confederation) Palmeiras	6	5	0	1	20	7	+13	15	Pot 1
3	E	(Argentine Football Association) Racing	6	4	2	0	9	2	+7	14	Pot 1
4	C	(Ecuadorian Football Federation) Barcelona	6	4	1	1	10	3	+7	13	Pot 1
5	G	(Brazilian Football Confederation) Flamengo	6	3	3	0	14	9	+5	12	Pot 1
6	F	(Argentine Football Association) Argentinos Juniors	6	4	0	2	7	3	+4	12	Pot 1
7	D	(Brazilian Football Confederation) Fluminense	6	3	2	1	10	7	+3	11	Pot 1
8	B	(Brazilian Football Confederation) Internacional	6	3	1	2	12	5	+7	10	Pot 1
9	E	(Brazilian Football Confederation) São Paulo	6	3	2	1	9	2	+7	11	Pot 2
10	C	(Argentine Football Association) Boca Juniors	6	3	1	2	6	2	+4	10	Pot 2
11	G	(Argentine Football Association) Vélez Sarsfield	6	3	1	2	10	8	+2	10	Pot 2
12	H	(Paraguayan Football Association) Cerro Porteño	6	3	1	2	4	5	−1	10	Pot 2
13	A	(Argentine Football Association) Defensa y Justicia	6	2	3	1	11	8	+3	9	Pot 2
14	D	(Argentine Football Association) River Plate	6	2	3	1	7	7	0	9	Pot 2
15	F	(Football Federation of Chile) Universidad Católica	6	3	0	3	6	6	0	9	Pot 2
16	B	(Paraguayan Football Association) Olimpia	6	3	0	3	13	14	−1	9	Pot 2

Source: CONMEBOL
Rules for classification: 1) Higher position in group; 2) Points; 3) Goal difference; 4) Goals scored; 5) Away goals scored; 6) CONMEBOL ranking (Regulations Article 22.i).

=== Bracket ===
The bracket was decided based on the round of 16 draw, which was held on 1 June 2021.

Round of 16
9	(Brazilian Football Confederation) São Paulo	1	3	4
3	(Argentine Football Association) Racing	1	1	2
15	(Football Federation of Chile) Universidad Católica	0	0	0
2	(Brazilian Football Confederation) Palmeiras	1	1	2
14	(Argentine Football Association) River Plate	1	2	3
6	(Argentine Football Association) Argentinos Juniors	1	0	1
10	(Argentine Football Association) Boca Juniors	0	0	0 (1)
1	(Brazilian Football Confederation) Atlético Mineiro (p)	0	0	0 (3)
16	(Paraguayan Football Association) Olimpia (p)	0	0	0 (5)
8	(Brazilian Football Confederation) Internacional	0	0	0 (4)
13	(Argentine Football Association) Defensa y Justicia	0	1	1
5	(Brazilian Football Confederation) Flamengo	1	4	5
12	(Paraguayan Football Association) Cerro Porteño	0	0	0
7	(Brazilian Football Confederation) Fluminense	2	1	3
11	(Argentine Football Association) Vélez Sarsfield	1	1	2
4	(Ecuadorian Football Federation) Barcelona	0	3	3

Quarter-finals
9	(Brazilian Football Confederation) São Paulo	1	0	1
2	(Brazilian Football Confederation) Palmeiras	1	3	4
14	(Argentine Football Association) River Plate	0	0	0
1	(Brazilian Football Confederation) Atlético Mineiro	1	3	4
16	(Paraguayan Football Association) Olimpia	1	1	2
5	(Brazilian Football Confederation) Flamengo	4	5	9
7	(Brazilian Football Confederation) Fluminense	2	1	3
4	(Ecuadorian Football Federation) Barcelona (a)	2	1	3

Semi-finals
2	(Brazilian Football Confederation) Palmeiras (a)	0	1	1
1	(Brazilian Football Confederation) Atlético Mineiro	0	1	1
5	(Brazilian Football Confederation) Flamengo	2	2	4
4	(Ecuadorian Football Federation) Barcelona	0	0	0

Final
27 November – Montevideo
2	(Brazilian Football Confederation) Palmeiras (a.e.t.)	2
5	(Brazilian Football Confederation) Flamengo	1

=== Round of 16 ===
Team 1	Agg.	Team 2	1st leg	2nd leg
Defensa y Justicia (Argentina)	1–5	(Brazil) Flamengo	0–1	1–4
Boca Juniors (Argentina)	0–0 (1–3 p)	(Brazil) Atlético Mineiro	0–0	0–0
Universidad Católica (Chile)	0–2	(Brazil) Palmeiras	0–1	0–1
Cerro Porteño (Paraguay)	0–3	(Brazil) Fluminense	0–2	0–1
Vélez Sarsfield (Argentina)	2–3	(Ecuador) Barcelona	1–0	1–3
São Paulo (Brazil)	4–2	(Argentina) Racing	1–1	3–1
River Plate (Argentina)	3–1	(Argentina) Argentinos Juniors	1–1	2–0
Olimpia (Paraguay)	0–0 (5–4 p)	(Brazil) Internacional	0–0	0–0

=== Quarter-finals ===
Team 1	Agg.	Team 2	1st leg	2nd leg
Olimpia (Paraguay)	2–9	(Brazil) Flamengo	1–4	1–5
River Plate (Argentina)	0–4	(Brazil) Atlético Mineiro	0–1	0–3
São Paulo (Brazil)	1–4	(Brazil) Palmeiras	1–1	0–3
Fluminense (Brazil)	3–3 (a)	(Ecuador) Barcelona	2–2	1–1

=== Semi-finals ===
Team 1	Agg.	Team 2	1st leg	2nd leg
Flamengo (Brazil)	4–0	(Ecuador) Barcelona	2–0	2–0
Palmeiras (Brazil)	1–1 (a)	(Brazil) Atlético Mineiro	0–0	1–1

=== Final ===
27 November 2021
17:00 UTC−3

Palmeiras (Brazil)	2–1 (a.e.t.)	(Brazil) Flamengo
Veiga 5'; Deyverson 95'	Report	Gabriel Barbosa 72'

Estadio Centenario, Montevideo
Attendance: 55,023
Referee: Néstor Pitana (Argentina)

== Statistics ==
=== Top scorers ===
Rank	Player	Team	1Q1	1Q2	2Q1	2Q2	3Q1	3Q2	GS1	GS2	GS3	GS4	GS5	GS6	⅛F1	⅛F2	QF1	QF2	SF1	SF2	F	Total
1	(Brazil) Gabriel Barbosa	(Brazil) Flamengo							1	2	2	1					2	2			1	11
2	(Brazil) Fred	(Brazil) Fluminense							1	2		1				1	1	1				7
2	(Brazil) Hulk	(Brazil) Atlético Mineiro								2	2	1		1				1				7
4	(Colombia) Miguel Borja	(Colombia) Junior			1	1		1		1	1	1										6
4	(Brazil) Bruno Henrique	(Brazil) Flamengo									1							1	2	2		6
4	(Brazil) Rony	(Brazil) Palmeiras								2	2			2								6
7	(Colombia) Jarlan Barrera	(Colombia) Atlético Nacional			1	1		1		2												5
7	(Argentina) Tomás Chancalay	(Argentina) Racing								1		1		3								5
7	(Argentina) Christian Ortiz	(Ecuador) Independiente del Valle						2	1		1		1									5
7	(Argentina) Braian Romero	(Argentina) Defensa y Justicia (Argentina) River Plate										1	1	1		2						5
7	(Brazil) Raphael Veiga	(Brazil) Palmeiras							1			1			1			1			1	5

Source: CONMEBOL.com

=== Team of the tournament ===
The CONMEBOL technical study group selected the following 11 players as the team of the tournament.

Position	Player	Team
Goalkeeper	(Brazil) Weverton	(Brazil) Palmeiras
Defenders	(Ecuador) Byron Castillo	(Ecuador) Barcelona
Defenders	(Paraguay) Gustavo Gómez	(Brazil) Palmeiras
Defenders	(Brazil) Guilherme Arana	(Brazil) Atlético Mineiro
Midfielders	(Brazil) Raphael Veiga	(Brazil) Palmeiras
Midfielders	(Brazil) Willian Arão	(Brazil) Flamengo
Midfielders	(Uruguay) Giorgian de Arrascaeta	(Brazil) Flamengo
Midfielders	(Brazil) Dudu	(Brazil) Palmeiras
Forwards	(Brazil) Hulk	(Brazil) Atlético Mineiro
Forwards	(Brazil) Gabriel Barbosa	(Brazil) Flamengo
Forwards	(Brazil) Roni	(Brazil) Palmeiras
Manager	(Portugal) Abel Ferreira	(Brazil) Palmeiras

== See also ==
- 2021 Copa Sudamericana
