= 2021 Copa Libertadores group stage =

The 2021 Copa Libertadores group stage was played from 20 April to 27 May 2021. A total of 32 teams competed in the group stage to decide the 16 places in the final stages of the 2021 Copa Libertadores.

== Draw ==
The draw for the group stage was held on 9 April 2021, 12:00 PYT (UTC−4), at the CONMEBOL Convention Centre in Luque, Paraguay.

Teams were seeded by their CONMEBOL Clubs ranking as of 1 February 2021 (shown in parentheses), taking into account the following three factors:

1. Performance in the last 10 years, taking into account Copa Libertadores and Copa Sudamericana results in the period 2011–2020.
2. Historical coefficient, taking into account Copa Libertadores and Copa Sudamericana results in the period 1960–2010 and 2002–2010 respectively.
3. Local tournament champion, with bonus points awarded to domestic league champions of the last 10 years.

For the group stage, the 32 teams were drawn into eight groups (Groups A–H) of four containing a team from each of the four pots. Teams from the same association could not be drawn into the same group, excluding the four winners of the third stage, which were seeded in Pot 4 and whose identity was not known at the time of the draw, and could be drawn into the same group with another team from the same association.

Group stage draw
Pot 1	Pot 2	Pot 3	Pot 4
(Brazil) Palmeiras (4); (Argentina) River Plate (1); (Argentina) Boca Juniors (2); (Uruguay) Nacional (5); (Brazil) Flamengo (6); (Paraguay) Cerro Porteño (11); (Paraguay) Olimpia (12); (Brazil) São Paulo (13)	(Argentina) Defensa y Justicia (37); (Brazil) Internacional (18); (Brazil) Atlético Mineiro (19); (Colombia) Santa Fe (21); (Argentina) Racing (22); (Ecuador) LDU Quito (26); (Chile) Universidad Católica (30); (Ecuador) Barcelona (31)	(Argentina) Vélez Sarsfield (33); (Peru) Sporting Cristal (35); (Colombia) América de Cali (36); (Brazil) Fluminense (39); (Bolivia) The Strongest (40); (Peru) Universitario (46); (Venezuela) Deportivo Táchira (60); (Argentina) Argentinos Juniors (81)	(Venezuela) Deportivo La Guaira (127); (Chile) Unión La Calera (128); (Bolivia) Always Ready (145); (Uruguay) Rentistas (250); Third stage winner G1; Third stage winner G2; Third stage winner G3; Third stage winner G4

Notes

1. ^{TH} The defending Copa Libertadores champions were seeded in Pot 1 and automatically allocated to Group A.
2. ^{CS} The defending Copa Sudamericana champions were seeded in Pot 2.

The following were the four winners of the third stage of qualifying which joined the 28 direct entrants in the group stage.

Match	Third stage winners
G1	(Colombia) Atlético Nacional (7)
G2	(Ecuador) Independiente del Valle (20)
G3	(Colombia) Junior (27)
G4	(Brazil) Santos (9)

== Format ==
In the group stage, each group is played on a home-and-away round-robin basis. The teams are ranked according to the following criteria: 1. Points (3 points for a win, 1 point for a draw, and 0 points for a loss); 2. Goal difference; 3. Goals scored; 4. Away goals scored; 5. CONMEBOL ranking (Regulations Article 2.4.2).

The winners and runners-up of each group advanced to the round of 16 of the final stages. The third-placed teams of each group entered the round of 16 of the 2021 Copa Sudamericana.

== Schedule ==
The schedule of each matchday was as follows (Regulations Article 2.2.2).

Matchday	Dates	Matches
Matchday 1	20–22 April 2021	Team 4 vs. Team 2, Team 3 vs. Team 1
Matchday 2	27–29 April 2021	Team 2 vs. Team 3, Team 1 vs. Team 4
Matchday 3	4–6 May 2021	Team 2 vs. Team 1, Team 4 vs. Team 3
Matchday 4	11–13 May 2021	Team 3 vs. Team 2, Team 4 vs. Team 1
Matchday 5	18–20 May 2021	Team 1 vs. Team 2, Team 3 vs. Team 4
Matchday 6	25–27 May 2021	Team 1 vs. Team 3, Team 2 vs. Team 4

== Groups ==
=== Group A ===
Pos	Team	Pld	W	D	L	GF	GA	GD	Pts	Qualification	PAL	DYJ	IDV	UNI
1	(Brazil) Palmeiras	6	5	0	1	20	7	+13	15	Round of 16	—	3–4	5–0	6–0
2	(Argentina) Defensa y Justicia	6	2	3	1	11	8	+3	9	Round of 16	1–2	—	1–1	3–0
3	(Ecuador) Independiente del Valle	6	1	2	3	8	11	−3	5	Copa Sudamericana	0–1	1–1	—	4–0
4	(Peru) Universitario	6	1	1	4	6	19	−13	4		2–3	1–1	3–2	—

Source: CONMEBOL
21 April 2021
19:00 UTC−5

Independiente del Valle (Ecuador)	1–1	(Argentina) Defensa y Justicia
Ortiz 28'	Report	Rotondi 7'

Estadio Rodrigo Paz Delgado, Quito (Note: Independiente del Valle played their home matches at Estadio Rodrigo Paz Delgado, Quito (originally scheduled at Estadio Olímpico Atahualpa, Quito) instead of their regular stadium Estadio Banco Guayaquil, Quito.)
Attendance: 0
Referee: Mario Díaz de Vivar (Paraguay)
21 April 2021
19:00 UTC−5

Universitario (Peru)	2–3	(Brazil) Palmeiras
Gutiérrez 65', 68' (pen.)	Report	Danilo 20'; Veiga 52'; Renan 90+5'

Estadio Monumental, Lima
Attendance: 0
Referee: Christian Ferreyra (Uruguay)

27 April 2021
21:30 UTC−3

Palmeiras (Brazil)	5–0	(Ecuador) Independiente del Valle
Rony 11', 74'; Luiz Adriano 20'; Patrick 65'; Danilo 81'	Report

Allianz Parque, São Paulo
Attendance: 0
Referee: Roberto Tobar (Chile)
28 April 2021
19:00 UTC−3

Defensa y Justicia (Argentina)	3–0	(Peru) Universitario
Pizzini 33'; Bou 71', 80' (pen.)	Report

Estadio Norberto Tomaghello, Gobernador Costa
Attendance: 0
Referee: Ángelo Hermosilla (Chile)

4 May 2021
21:30 UTC−3

Defensa y Justicia (Argentina)	1–2	(Brazil) Palmeiras
Tripichio 68'	Report	Rony 47', 56'

Estadio Norberto Tomaghello, Gobernador Costa
Attendance: 0
Referee: Wilmar Roldán (Colombia)
5 May 2021
17:00 UTC−5

Independiente del Valle (Ecuador)	4–0	(Peru) Universitario
Sánchez 45+3', 73'; Murillo 61'; Ortiz 85'	Report

Estadio Rodrigo Paz Delgado, Quito
Attendance: 0
Referee: Andrés Cunha (Uruguay)

11 May 2021
19:30 UTC−5

Independiente del Valle (Ecuador)	0–1	(Brazil) Palmeiras
	Report	Veiga 43' (pen.)

Estadio Rodrigo Paz Delgado, Quito
Attendance: 0
Referee: Jesús Valenzuela (Venezuela)
12 May 2021
21:00 UTC−5

Universitario (Peru)	1–1	(Argentina) Defensa y Justicia
Quintero 45+5'	Report	Romero 53'

Estadio Monumental, Lima
Attendance: 0
Referee: Nicolás Gallo (Colombia)

18 May 2021
19:15 UTC−3

Palmeiras (Brazil)	3–4	(Argentina) Defensa y Justicia
Zé Rafael 11'; Willian 35'; Scarpa 75'	Report	Bou 9', 27'; M. Rodríguez 52'; Romero 90+4'

Allianz Parque, São Paulo
Attendance: 0
Referee: Andrés Cunha (Uruguay)
18 May 2021
19:30 UTC−5

Universitario (Peru)	3–2	(Ecuador) Independiente del Valle
Valera 20', 48'; Quina 72'	Report	Sánchez 8'; Ortiz 59'

Estadio Monumental, Lima
Attendance: 0
Referee: Piero Maza (Chile)

27 May 2021
19:00 UTC−3

Palmeiras (Brazil)	6–0	(Peru) Universitario
Viña 42'; Zé Rafael 45+2'; Gómez 55'; Willian 60'; Rony 77', 90'	Report

Allianz Parque, São Paulo
Attendance: 0
Referee: Cristian Garay (Chile)
27 May 2021
19:00 UTC−3

Defensa y Justicia (Argentina)	1–1	(Ecuador) Independiente del Valle
Romero 36'	Report	Escobar 11'

Estadio Norberto Tomaghello, Gobernador Costa
Attendance: 0
Referee: Edina Alves (Brazil)

=== Group B ===
Pos	Team	Pld	W	D	L	GF	GA	GD	Pts	Qualification	INT	OLI	TAC	CAR
1	(Brazil) Internacional	6	3	1	2	12	5	+7	10	Round of 16	—	6–1	4–0	0–0
2	(Paraguay) Olimpia	6	3	0	3	13	14	−1	9	Round of 16	0–1	—	6–2	2–1
3	(Venezuela) Deportivo Táchira	6	3	0	3	14	17	−3	9	Copa Sudamericana	2–1	3–2	—	7–2
4	(Bolivia) Always Ready	6	2	1	3	8	11	−3	7		2–0	1–2	2–0	—

Source: CONMEBOL
20 April 2021
18:15 UTC−4

Always Ready (Bolivia)	2–0	(Brazil) Internacional
Saucedo 53'; Algarañaz 90+5'	Report

Estadio Hernando Siles, La Paz (Note: Always Ready played their home matches at Estadio Hernando Siles, La Paz instead of their regular stadium Estadio Municipal de Villa Ingenio, El Alto which did not meet CONMEBOL requirements.)
Attendance: 0
Referee: Nicolás Gallo (Colombia)
20 April 2021
18:15 UTC−4

Deportivo Táchira (Venezuela)	3–2	(Paraguay) Olimpia
Gómez 16'; Góndola 57'; Trejo 80'	Report	Sosa 14'; Torres 76'

Estadio Polideportivo de Pueblo Nuevo, San Cristóbal
Attendance: 0
Referee: Esteban Ostojich (Uruguay)

27 April 2021
21:30 UTC−3 (Note: The Internacional v Deportivo Táchira match, originally scheduled for 27 April 2021, 19:15 local time, was rescheduled to 21:30 local time.)

Internacional (Brazil)	4–0	(Venezuela) Deportivo Táchira
Cuesta 20'; Patrick 24'; Thiago Galhardo 43'; Yuri Alberto 75'	Report

Estádio Beira-Rio, Porto Alegre
Attendance: 0
Referee: Andrés Matonte (Uruguay)
28 April 2021 (Note: The Olimpia v Always Ready match, originally scheduled on 29 April 2021, 22:00 local time, was rescheduled to 28 April 2021, 22:00 local time.)
22:00 UTC−4

Olimpia (Paraguay)	2–1	(Bolivia) Always Ready
Santa Cruz 71'; Ortiz 80'	Report	Polenta 64' (o.g.)

Estadio Manuel Ferreira, Asunción
Attendance: 0
Referee: Nicolás Lamolina (Argentina)

5 May 2021
21:00 UTC−3

Internacional (Brazil)	6–1	(Paraguay) Olimpia
Cuesta 29'; Edenílson 52' (pen.); Thiago Galhardo 64', 71'; Yuri Alberto 77'; Caio 80'	Report	D. González 86' (pen.)

Estádio Beira-Rio, Porto Alegre
Attendance: 0
Referee: Facundo Tello (Argentina)
6 May 2021 (Note: The Always Ready v Deportivo Táchira match, originally scheduled for 5 May 2021, 22:00 local time, was rescheduled to 6 May 2021, 18:00 local time.)
18:00 UTC−4

Always Ready (Bolivia)	2–0	(Venezuela) Deportivo Táchira
Ovejero 24'; Mosquera 82' (pen.)	Report

Estadio Hernando Siles, La Paz
Attendance: 0
Referee: Andrés Matonte (Uruguay)

11 May 2021
18:15 UTC−4

Deportivo Táchira (Venezuela)	2–1	(Brazil) Internacional
Hernández 77'; Cova 86' (pen.)	Report	Thiago Galhardo 52' (pen.)

Estadio Polideportivo de Pueblo Nuevo, San Cristóbal
Attendance: 0
Referee: Wilmar Roldán (Colombia)
13 May 2021
20:00 UTC−4

Always Ready (Bolivia)	1–2	(Paraguay) Olimpia
Ramallo 42'	Report	W. González 23'; Silva 90+3'

Estadio Hernando Siles, La Paz
Attendance: 0
Referee: Darío Herrera (Argentina)

19 May 2021
22:00 UTC−4

Deportivo Táchira (Venezuela)	7–2	(Bolivia) Always Ready
Góndola 12', 46'; Cova 24' (pen.); Chacón 37'; Gómez 44'; Covea 61'; Angarita 74'	Report	Vieira 55'; Mosquera 68' (pen.)

Estadio Polideportivo de Pueblo Nuevo, San Cristóbal
Attendance: 0
Referee: Jhon Ospina (Colombia)
20 May 2021
20:00 UTC−4

Olimpia (Paraguay)	0–1	(Brazil) Internacional
	Report	Yuri Alberto 83'

Estadio Manuel Ferreira, Asunción
Attendance: 0
Referee: Néstor Pitana (Argentina)

26 May 2021
18:00 UTC−4

Olimpia (Paraguay)	6–2	(Venezuela) Deportivo Táchira
Ortiz 25', 82'; Quintana 31'; D. González 56' (pen.); Pitta 69'; Varela 71' (o.g.)	Report	Trejo 61'; Angarita 76'

Estadio Manuel Ferreira, Asunción
Attendance: 0
Referee: Diego Haro (Peru)
26 May 2021
19:00 UTC−3

Internacional (Brazil)	0–0	(Bolivia) Always Ready
	Report

Estádio Beira-Rio, Porto Alegre
Attendance: 0
Referee: Patricio Loustau (Argentina)

=== Group C ===
Pos	Team	Pld	W	D	L	GF	GA	GD	Pts	Qualification	BSC	BOC	SAN	STR
1	(Ecuador) Barcelona	6	4	1	1	10	3	+7	13	Round of 16	—	1–0	3–1	4–0
2	(Argentina) Boca Juniors	6	3	1	2	6	2	+4	10	Round of 16	0–0	—	2–0	3–0
3	(Brazil) Santos	6	2	0	4	8	9	−1	6	Copa Sudamericana	0–2	1–0	—	5–0
4	(Bolivia) The Strongest	6	2	0	4	4	14	−10	6		2–0	0–1	2–1	—

Source: CONMEBOL
20 April 2021
19:15 UTC−3

Santos (Brazil)	0–2	(Ecuador) Barcelona
	Report	Garcés 53'; Pará 69' (o.g.)

Estádio Urbano Caldeira, Santos
Attendance: 0
Referee: Andrés Matonte (Uruguay)
21 April 2021
18:00 UTC−4

The Strongest (Bolivia)	0–1	(Argentina) Boca Juniors
	Report	Villa 7'

Estadio Hernando Siles, La Paz
Attendance: 0
Referee: Jhon Ospina (Colombia)

27 April 2021
21:30 UTC−3

Boca Juniors (Argentina)	2–0	(Brazil) Santos
Tevez 47'; Villa 69'	Report

Estadio Alberto J. Armando, Buenos Aires
Attendance: 0
Referee: Jesús Valenzuela (Venezuela)
28 April 2021
21:00 UTC−5

Barcelona (Ecuador)	4–0	(Bolivia) The Strongest
Garcés 46'; Pineida 67'; Martínez 73'; Valverde 86' (o.g.)	Report

Estadio Monumental Isidro Romero Carbo, Guayaquil
Attendance: 0
Referee: Derlis López (Paraguay)

4 May 2021
19:15 UTC−3

Santos (Brazil)	5–0	(Bolivia) The Strongest
Marinho 1'; Pirani 26'; Vinicius 43'; Lucas Braga 59'; Kevin Malthus 83'	Report

Estádio Urbano Caldeira, Santos
Attendance: 0
Referee: Cristian Garay (Chile)
4 May 2021
19:30 UTC−5

Barcelona (Ecuador)	1–0	(Argentina) Boca Juniors
Garcés 62'	Report

Estadio Monumental Isidro Romero Carbo, Guayaquil
Attendance: 0
Referee: Andrés Rojas (Colombia)

11 May 2021
18:15 UTC−4

The Strongest (Bolivia)	2–0	(Ecuador) Barcelona
Reinoso 45+1', 65'	Report

Estadio Hernando Siles, La Paz
Attendance: 0
Referee: Ángel Arteaga (Venezuela) (Note: Referee Yender Herrera from Venezuela, who was originally assigned to the match between The Strongest and Barcelona, was replaced by Ángel Artega from Venezuela.)
11 May 2021
19:15 UTC−3

Santos (Brazil)	1–0	(Argentina) Boca Juniors
Felipe Jonatan 41'	Report

Estádio Urbano Caldeira, Santos
Attendance: 0
Referee: Christian Ferreyra (Uruguay)

18 May 2021
18:15 UTC−4

The Strongest (Bolivia)	2–1	(Brazil) Santos
Reinoso 16'; Willie 23'	Report	Felipe Jonatan 64'

Estadio Hernando Siles, La Paz
Attendance: 0
Referee: Diego Haro (Peru)
20 May 2021
21:00 UTC−3

Boca Juniors (Argentina)	0–0	(Ecuador) Barcelona
	Report

Estadio Alberto J. Armando, Buenos Aires
Attendance: 0
Referee: Wilmar Roldán (Colombia)

26 May 2021
21:00 UTC−3

Boca Juniors (Argentina)	3–0	(Bolivia) The Strongest
Almendra 3'; Villa 44'; Valverde 56' (o.g.)	Report

Estadio Alberto J. Armando, Buenos Aires
Attendance: 0
Referee: Roberto Tobar (Chile)
26 May 2021
19:00 UTC−5

Barcelona (Ecuador)	3–1	(Brazil) Santos
Díaz 15', 54'; Montaño 77'	Report	Kaio Jorge 45+2'

Estadio Monumental Isidro Romero Carbo, Guayaquil
Attendance: 0
Referee: Andrés Rojas (Colombia)

=== Group D ===
Pos	Team	Pld	W	D	L	GF	GA	GD	Pts	Qualification	FLU	RIV	JUN	SFE
1	(Brazil) Fluminense	6	3	2	1	10	7	+3	11	Round of 16	—	1–1	1–2	2–1
2	(Argentina) River Plate	6	2	3	1	7	7	0	9	Round of 16	1–3	—	2–1	2–1
3	(Colombia) Junior	6	1	4	1	6	6	0	7	Copa Sudamericana	1–1	1–1	—	1–1
4	(Colombia) Santa Fe	6	0	3	3	4	7	−3	3		1–2	0–0	0–0	—

Source: CONMEBOL
22 April 2021
19:00 UTC−3

Fluminense (Brazil)	1–1	(Argentina) River Plate
Fred 66'	Report	Montiel 13' (pen.)

Estádio do Maracanã, Rio de Janeiro
Attendance: 0
Referee: Roberto Tobar (Chile)
22 April 2021
21:00 UTC−5

Junior (Colombia)	1–1	(Colombia) Santa Fe
Hinestroza 31'	Report	Osorio 35' (pen.)

Estadio Metropolitano Roberto Meléndez, Barranquilla
Attendance: 0
Referee: Jesús Valenzuela (Venezuela)

28 April 2021
19:00 UTC−5

Santa Fe (Colombia)	1–2	(Brazil) Fluminense
Giraldo 51'	Report	Fred 5', 46'

Estadio Centenario, Armenia (Note: Santa Fe played their home match against Fluminense at Estadio Centenario, Armenia instead of the originally scheduled Estadio Metropolitano de Techo, Bogotá due to measures issued by the local government of Bogotá to contain the COVID-19 pandemic.)
Attendance: 0
Referee: Andrés Cunha (Uruguay)
28 April 2021
21:00 UTC−3

River Plate (Argentina)	2–1	(Colombia) Junior
Martínez 29'; Álvarez 55'	Report	Borja 90+4'

Estadio Monumental Antonio Vespucio Liberti, Buenos Aires
Attendance: 0
Referee: Juan Benítez (Paraguay)

6 May 2021 (Note: The Santa Fe v River Plate match, originally scheduled for 5 May 2021, 19:00 local time at Estadio Centenario, Armenia was rescheduled to 6 May 2021, 20:00 local time at Estadio General Pablo Rojas, Asunción (Paraguay) due to civil unrest in Colombia.)
20:00 UTC−4

Santa Fe (Colombia)	0–0	(Argentina) River Plate
	Report

Estadio General Pablo Rojas, Asunción (Paraguay)
Attendance: 0
Referee: Alexis Herrera (Venezuela)
6 May 2021
19:00 UTC−5 (Note: The Junior v Fluminense match, originally scheduled for 6 May 2021, 17:00 local time at Estadio Romelio Martínez, Barranquilla was rescheduled to 6 May 2021, 19:00 local time at Estadio Monumental Isidro Romero Carbo, Guayaquil (Ecuador) due to civil unrest in Colombia.)

Junior (Colombia)	1–1	(Brazil) Fluminense
Borja 11' (pen.)	Report	Kayky 20'

Estadio Monumental Isidro Romero Carbo, Guayaquil (Ecuador)
Attendance: 0
Referee: Julio Bascuñán (Chile)

12 May 2021
21:00 UTC−3

Fluminense (Brazil)	2–1	(Colombia) Santa Fe
Fred 60'; Caio 77'	Report	González 58'

Estádio do Maracanã, Rio de Janeiro
Attendance: 0
Referee: Eber Aquino (Paraguay)
12 May 2021
19:00 UTC−5

Junior (Colombia)	1–1	(Argentina) River Plate
Borja 20'	Report	Díaz 90+2'

Estadio Romelio Martínez, Barranquilla (Note: Junior played their home match against River Plate at Estadio Romelio Martínez, Barranquilla instead of their regular stadium Estadio Metropolitano Roberto Meléndez, Barranquilla.)
Attendance: 0
Referee: Esteban Ostojich (Uruguay)

18 May 2021
21:30 UTC−3

Fluminense (Brazil)	1–2	(Colombia) Junior
Hernández 75'	Report	Valencia 35'; Cetré 50'

Estádio do Maracanã, Rio de Janeiro
Attendance: 0
Referee: Roberto Tobar (Chile)
19 May 2021
21:00 UTC−3

River Plate (Argentina)	2–1	(Colombia) Santa Fe
Angileri 3'; Álvarez 6'	Report	Osorio 73'

Estadio Monumental Antonio Vespucio Liberti, Buenos Aires
Attendance: 0
Referee: Víctor Carrillo (Peru)

25 May 2021
19:15 UTC−3

River Plate (Argentina)	1–3	(Brazil) Fluminense
Girotti 85'	Report	Caio 22'; Nenê 29'; Yago Felipe 90+2'

Estadio Monumental Antonio Vespucio Liberti, Buenos Aires
Attendance: 0
Referee: Esteban Ostojich (Uruguay)
25 May 2021
17:15 UTC−5

Santa Fe (Colombia)	0–0	(Colombia) Junior
	Report

Estadio Bellavista, Ambato (Ecuador) (Note: Santa Fe played their home match against Junior at Estadio Bellavista, Ambato (Ecuador) instead of the originally scheduled Estadio Metropolitano de Techo, Bogotá due to civil unrest in Colombia.)
Attendance: 0
Referee: Andrés Cunha (Uruguay)

=== Group E ===
Pos	Team	Pld	W	D	L	GF	GA	GD	Pts	Qualification	RAC	SPA	CRI	REN
1	(Argentina) Racing	6	4	2	0	9	2	+7	14	Round of 16	—	0–0	2–1	3–0
2	(Brazil) São Paulo	6	3	2	1	9	2	+7	11	Round of 16	0–1	—	3–0	2–0
3	(Peru) Sporting Cristal	6	1	1	4	3	10	−7	4	Copa Sudamericana	0–2	0–3	—	2–0
4	(Uruguay) Rentistas	6	0	3	3	2	9	−7	3		1–1	1–1	0–0	—

Source: CONMEBOL
20 April 2021
19:30 UTC−5

Sporting Cristal (Peru)	0–3	(Brazil) São Paulo
	Report	Luan 17'; Benítez 60'; Éder 81'

Estadio Nacional, Lima (Note: Sporting Cristal played their home matches at Estadio Nacional, Lima instead of their regular stadium Estadio Alberto Gallardo, Lima which did not meet CONMEBOL requirements.)
Attendance: 0
Referee: Andrés Cunha (Uruguay)
21 April 2021
21:00 UTC−3

Rentistas (Uruguay)	1–1	(Argentina) Racing
Rodríguez 42'	Report	Cáceres 89'

Estadio Centenario, Montevideo (Note: Rentistas played their home matches at Estadio Centenario, Montevideo instead of their regular stadium Estadio Complejo Rentistas, Montevideo which did not meet CONMEBOL requirements.)
Attendance: 0
Referee: Carlos Benítez (Paraguay)

29 April 2021
19:00 UTC−3

Racing (Argentina)	2–1	(Peru) Sporting Cristal
Cáceres 13'; Chancalay 83'	Report	Gonzáles 52'

Estadio Presidente Juan Domingo Perón, Avellaneda
Attendance: 0
Referee: Ángel Arteaga (Venezuela)
29 April 2021
21:00 UTC−3

São Paulo (Brazil)	2–0	(Uruguay) Rentistas
Pablo 38'; Reinaldo 90' (pen.)	Report

Estádio do Morumbi, São Paulo
Attendance: 0
Referee: Nicolás Gamboa (Chile)

5 May 2021
19:00 UTC−3

Racing (Argentina)	0–0	(Brazil) São Paulo
	Report

Estadio Presidente Juan Domingo Perón, Avellaneda
Attendance: 0
Referee: Piero Maza (Chile)
5 May 2021
21:00 UTC−3

Rentistas (Uruguay)	0–0	(Peru) Sporting Cristal
	Report

Estadio Centenario, Montevideo
Attendance: 0
Referee: Carlos Herrera (Colombia)

11 May 2021
19:30 UTC−5

Sporting Cristal (Peru)	0–2	(Argentina) Racing
	Report	Chancalay 74'; Piatti 76'

Estadio Nacional, Lima
Attendance: 0
Referee: Jhon Ospina (Colombia)
12 May 2021
19:00 UTC−3

Rentistas (Uruguay)	1–1	(Brazil) São Paulo
R. González 13'	Report	Orejuela 4'

Estadio Centenario, Montevideo
Attendance: 0
Referee: José Argote (Venezuela)

18 May 2021
21:30 UTC−3

São Paulo (Brazil)	0–1	(Argentina) Racing
	Report	Novillo 28'

Estádio do Morumbi, São Paulo
Attendance: 0
Referee: Jesús Valenzuela (Venezuela)
19 May 2021
17:00 UTC−5

Sporting Cristal (Peru)	2–0	(Uruguay) Rentistas
Hohberg 41'; Távara 67'	Report

Estadio Nacional, Lima
Attendance: 0
Referee: Franklin Congo (Ecuador)

25 May 2021
21:30 UTC−3

São Paulo (Brazil)	3–0	(Peru) Sporting Cristal
B. Alves 25'; Rojas 68'; Bueno 70'	Report

Estádio do Morumbi, São Paulo
Attendance: 0
Referee: Wilmar Roldán (Colombia)
25 May 2021
21:30 UTC−3

Racing (Argentina)	3–0	(Uruguay) Rentistas
Chancalay 14', 50', 69'	Report

Estadio Presidente Juan Domingo Perón, Avellaneda
Attendance: 0
Referee: Nicolás Gamboa (Chile)

=== Group F ===
Pos	Team	Pld	W	D	L	GF	GA	GD	Pts	Qualification	ARG	UCA	NAC	ATN
1	(Argentina) Argentinos Juniors	6	4	0	2	7	3	+4	12	Round of 16	—	0–1	2–0	1–0
2	(Chile) Universidad Católica	6	3	0	3	6	6	0	9	Round of 16	0–2	—	3–1	2–0
3	(Uruguay) Nacional	6	2	2	2	8	9	−1	8	Copa Sudamericana	2–0	1–0	—	4–4
4	(Colombia) Atlético Nacional	6	1	2	3	6	9	−3	5		0–2	2–0	0–0	—

Source: CONMEBOL
20 April 2021
19:15 UTC−3

Argentinos Juniors (Argentina)	2–0	(Uruguay) Nacional
Ávalos 25'; Herrera 88'	Report

Estadio Diego Armando Maradona, Buenos Aires
Attendance: 0
Referee: Víctor Carrillo (Peru)
22 April 2021
19:00 UTC−5

Atlético Nacional (Colombia)	2–0	(Chile) Universidad Católica
Andrade 39'; Duque 45'	Report

Estadio Hernán Ramírez Villegas, Pereira (Note: Atlético Nacional played their home matches at Estadio Hernán Ramírez Villegas, Pereira instead of their regular stadium Estadio Atanasio Girardot, Medellín which temporarily underwent maintenance works ahead of the 2021 Copa América.)
Attendance: 0
Referee: Alexis Herrera (Venezuela)

28 April 2021
19:00 UTC−3

Nacional (Uruguay)	4–4	(Colombia) Atlético Nacional
Bergessio 12', 51', 64'; Fernández 45+4'	Report	Barrera 8', 85'; Andrade 45+2'; Orihuela 74' (o.g.)

Estadio Gran Parque Central, Montevideo
Attendance: 0
Referee: Augusto Aragón (Ecuador)
29 April 2021 (Note: The Universidad Católica v Argentinos Juniors match, originally scheduled for 28 April 2021, 22:00 local time, was rescheduled to 29 April 2021, 18:00 local time.)
18:00 UTC−4

Universidad Católica (Chile)	0–2	(Argentina) Argentinos Juniors
	Report	Florentín 23'; Hauche 51'

Estadio San Carlos de Apoquindo, Santiago
Attendance: 0
Referee: Gery Vargas (Bolivia)

5 May 2021
22:00 UTC−4

Universidad Católica (Chile)	3–1	(Uruguay) Nacional
Zampedri 30' (pen.); Valencia 59'; Montes 90+3'	Report	Fernández 45+1'

Estadio San Carlos de Apoquindo, Santiago
Attendance: 0
Referee: Anderson Daronco (Brazil)
6 May 2021
18:00 UTC−4 (Note: The Atlético Nacional v Argentinos Juniors match, originally scheduled for 6 May 2021, 19:00 local time at Estadio Hernán Ramírez Villegas, Pereira was rescheduled to 6 May 2021, 18:00 local time at Estadio Manuel Ferreira, Asunción (Paraguay) due to civil unrest in Colombia.)

Atlético Nacional (Colombia)	0–2	(Argentina) Argentinos Juniors
	Report	Ávalos 18', 80'

Estadio Manuel Ferreira, Asunción (Paraguay)
Attendance: 0
Referee: Jesús Valenzuela (Venezuela)

12 May 2021
19:00 UTC−3

Argentinos Juniors (Argentina)	0–1	(Chile) Universidad Católica
	Report	Zampedri 74'

Estadio Diego Armando Maradona, Buenos Aires
Attendance: 0
Referee: Wilton Sampaio (Brazil)
12 May 2021
22:00 UTC−5 (Note: The kickoff of the Atlético Nacional v Nacional match, originally scheduled for 21:00 local time, was delayed to 22:00 local time.)

Atlético Nacional (Colombia)	0–0	(Uruguay) Nacional
	Report

Estadio Hernán Ramírez Villegas, Pereira
Attendance: 0
Referee: Diego Haro (Peru)

18 May 2021
19:15 UTC−3

Nacional (Uruguay)	1–0	(Chile) Universidad Católica
Ocampo 29'	Report

Estadio Gran Parque Central, Montevideo
Attendance: 0
Referee: Raphael Claus (Brazil)
20 May 2021
19:00 UTC−3

Argentinos Juniors (Argentina)	1–0	(Colombia) Atlético Nacional
Herrera 90'	Report

Estadio Diego Armando Maradona, Buenos Aires
Attendance: 0
Referee: Bruno Arleu (Brazil) (Note: Referee Anderson Daronco from Brazil, who was originally assigned to the Argentinos Juniors v Atlético Nacional match, was replaced by Bruno Arleu from Brazil.)

26 May 2021
23:00 UTC−3

Nacional (Uruguay)	2–0	(Argentina) Argentinos Juniors
Bergessio 73'; Ocampo 84'	Report

Estadio Gran Parque Central, Montevideo
Attendance: 0
Referee: Eber Aquino (Paraguay)
26 May 2021
22:00 UTC−4

Universidad Católica (Chile)	2–0	(Colombia) Atlético Nacional
Aued 9'; Valencia 79'	Report

Estadio San Carlos de Apoquindo, Santiago
Attendance: 0
Referee: Wilton Sampaio (Brazil)

=== Group G ===
Pos	Team	Pld	W	D	L	GF	GA	GD	Pts	Qualification	FLA	VEL	LDQ	ULC
1	(Brazil) Flamengo	6	3	3	0	14	9	+5	12	Round of 16	—	0–0	2–2	4–1
2	(Argentina) Vélez Sarsfield	6	3	1	2	10	8	+2	10	Round of 16	2–3	—	3–1	2–1
3	(Ecuador) LDU Quito	6	2	2	2	15	13	+2	8	Copa Sudamericana	2–3	3–1	—	5–2
4	(Chile) Unión La Calera	6	0	2	4	8	17	−9	2		2–2	0–2	2–2	—

Source: CONMEBOL
20 April 2021
21:30 UTC−3

Vélez Sarsfield (Argentina)	2–3	(Brazil) Flamengo
Janson 21', 54'	Report	Arão 43'; Gabriel Barbosa 62' (pen.); De Arrascaeta 80'

Estadio José Amalfitani, Buenos Aires
Attendance: 0
Referee: Wilmar Roldán (Colombia)
21 April 2021
22:00 UTC−4

Unión La Calera (Chile)	2–2	(Ecuador) LDU Quito
A. Vilches 18', 70'	Report	Arce 51', 83'

Estadio Municipal Nicolás Chahuán Nazar, La Calera
Attendance: 0
Referee: Gery Vargas (Bolivia)

27 April 2021
17:15 UTC−5

LDU Quito (Ecuador)	3–1	(Argentina) Vélez Sarsfield
Martínez Borja 28', 53'; Zunino 64'	Report	Galdames 42'

Estadio Rodrigo Paz Delgado, Quito
Attendance: 0
Referee: Diego Haro (Peru)
27 April 2021
19:15 UTC−3

Flamengo (Brazil)	4–1	(Chile) Unión La Calera
Gabriel Barbosa 31', 79'; De Arrascaeta 34'; Pedro 85'	Report	Sáez 57'

Estádio do Maracanã, Rio de Janeiro
Attendance: 0
Referee: José Argote (Venezuela) (Note: Referee Eber Aquino from Paraguay, who was originally assigned to the Flamengo v Unión La Calera match was replaced by José Argote from Venezuela.)

4 May 2021
18:15 UTC−4

Unión La Calera (Chile)	0–2	(Argentina) Vélez Sarsfield
	Report	Bouzat 38'; Orellano 90+5'

Estadio Municipal Nicolás Chahuán Nazar, La Calera
Attendance: 0
Referee: Kevin Ortega (Peru)
4 May 2021
19:30 UTC−5

LDU Quito (Ecuador)	2–3	(Brazil) Flamengo
Martínez Borja 50'; Amarilla 61'	Report	Gabriel Barbosa 3', 85' (pen.); Bruno Henrique 30'

Estadio Rodrigo Paz Delgado, Quito
Attendance: 0
Referee: Esteban Ostojich (Uruguay)

11 May 2021
20:30 UTC−4

Unión La Calera (Chile)	2–2	(Brazil) Flamengo
Martínez 8'; Arão 27' (o.g.)	Report	Gabriel Barbosa 31' (pen.); Arão 77'

Estadio Municipal Nicolás Chahuán Nazar, La Calera
Attendance: 0
Referee: Andrés Rojas (Colombia)
13 May 2021
19:00 UTC−3

Vélez Sarsfield (Argentina)	3–1	(Ecuador) LDU Quito
Almada 45'; Janson 69'; Mancuello 90+3'	Report	Zunino 78'

Estadio José Amalfitani, Buenos Aires
Attendance: 0
Referee: Andrés Matonte (Uruguay) (Note: Referee Víctor Carrillo from Peru, who was originally assigned to the Vélez Sarsfield v LDU Quito match, was replaced by Andrés Matonte from Uruguay.)

19 May 2021
19:00 UTC−3

Vélez Sarsfield (Argentina)	2–1	(Chile) Unión La Calera
Tarragona 2'; Almada 39'	Report	J. Vargas 5'

Estadio José Amalfitani, Buenos Aires
Attendance: 0
Referee: Derlis López (Paraguay)
19 May 2021
21:00 UTC−3

Flamengo (Brazil)	2–2	(Ecuador) LDU Quito
Pedro 32'; Gustavo Henrique 88'	Report	Guerra 35'; Julio 60'

Estádio do Maracanã, Rio de Janeiro
Attendance: 0
Referee: Alexis Herrera (Venezuela)

27 May 2021
21:00 UTC−3

Flamengo (Brazil)	0–0	(Argentina) Vélez Sarsfield
	Report

Estádio do Maracanã, Rio de Janeiro
Attendance: 0
Referee: Leodán González (Uruguay)
27 May 2021
19:00 UTC−5

LDU Quito (Ecuador)	5–2	(Chile) Unión La Calera
Fernández 15' (o.g.); Amarilla 28', 33'; Arce 58', 60'	Report	Sáez 54', 90+2'

Estadio Rodrigo Paz Delgado, Quito
Attendance: 0
Referee: Carlos Betancur (Colombia)

=== Group H ===
Pos	Team	Pld	W	D	L	GF	GA	GD	Pts	Qualification	CAM	CCP	AME	DLG
1	(Brazil) Atlético Mineiro	6	5	1	0	15	3	+12	16	Round of 16	—	4–0	2–1	4–0
2	(Paraguay) Cerro Porteño	6	3	1	2	4	5	−1	10	Round of 16	0–1	—	1–0	0–0
3	(Colombia) América de Cali	6	1	1	4	5	9	−4	4	Copa Sudamericana	1–3	0–2	—	3–1
4	(Venezuela) Deportivo La Guaira	6	0	3	3	2	9	−7	3		1–1	0–1	0–0	—

Source: CONMEBOL
21 April 2021
18:00 UTC−4

Deportivo La Guaira (Venezuela)	1–1	(Brazil) Atlético Mineiro
Martínez 20'	Report	Zaracho 65'

Estadio Olímpico de la UCV, Caracas
Attendance: 0
Referee: Facundo Tello (Argentina)
21 April 2021
21:00 UTC−5

América de Cali (Colombia)	0–2	(Paraguay) Cerro Porteño
	Report	Morales 29'; Cardozo 90'

Estadio Alfonso López, Bucaramanga (Note: América de Cali played their home match against Cerro Porteño at Estadio Alfonso López, Bucaramanga and played their home match against Atlético Mineiro at Estadio Romelio Martínez, Barranquilla instead of their regular stadium Estadio Pascual Guerrero, Cali which underwent maintenance works ahead of the 2021 Copa América.)
Attendance: 0
Referee: Fernando Echenique (Argentina)

27 April 2021
19:15 UTC−3 (Note: The Atlético Mineiro v América de Cali match, originally scheduled for 27 April 2021, 21:30 local time, was rescheduled to 19:15 local time.)

Atlético Mineiro (Brazil)	2–1	(Colombia) América de Cali
Hulk 59' (pen.), 63'	Report	Sánchez 77'

Estádio Mineirão, Belo Horizonte
Attendance: 0
Referee: Daniel Fedorczuk (Uruguay)
28 April 2021
18:00 UTC−4 (Note: The Cerro Porteño v Deportivo La Guaira match, originally scheduled for 28 April 2021, 20:00 local time, was rescheduled to 18:00 local time.)

Cerro Porteño (Paraguay)	0–0	(Venezuela) Deportivo La Guaira
	Report

Estadio General Pablo Rojas, Asunción
Attendance: 0
Referee: Darío Herrera (Argentina)

4 May 2021
19:15 UTC−3

Atlético Mineiro (Brazil)	4–0	(Paraguay) Cerro Porteño
Hulk 9', 45+1'; Savarino 73'; Vargas 90+2'	Report

Estádio Mineirão, Belo Horizonte
Attendance: 0
Referee: Néstor Pitana (Argentina)
6 May 2021
22:00 UTC−4

Deportivo La Guaira (Venezuela)	0–0	(Colombia) América de Cali
	Report

Estadio Olímpico de la UCV, Caracas
Attendance: 0
Referee: Andrés Merlos (Argentina)

12 May 2021
20:00 UTC−4

Deportivo La Guaira (Venezuela)	0–1	(Paraguay) Cerro Porteño
	Report	Aquino 28' (pen.)

Estadio Olímpico de la UCV, Caracas
Attendance: 0
Referee: Facundo Tello (Argentina)
13 May 2021
19:00 UTC−5

América de Cali (Colombia)	1–3	(Brazil) Atlético Mineiro
Moreno 24'	Report	Hulk 21'; Arana 54'; Vargas 90+7'

Estadio Romelio Martínez, Barranquilla
Attendance: 0
Referee: Andrés Cunha (Uruguay)

19 May 2021
20:00 UTC−4

Cerro Porteño (Paraguay)	0–1	(Brazil) Atlético Mineiro
	Report	Keno 90+2'

Estadio General Pablo Rojas, Asunción
Attendance: 0
Referee: Esteban Ostojich (Uruguay)
19 May 2021
22:00 UTC−4

América de Cali (Colombia)	3–1	(Venezuela) Deportivo La Guaira
Ramos 21' (pen.), 72'; Moreno 55'	Report	Ortiz 30'

Estadio Ramón Tahuichi Aguilera, Santa Cruz de la Sierra (Bolivia) (Note: The América de Cali v Deportivo La Guaira match, originally scheduled on 19 May 2021, 21:00 local time at Estadio Pascual Guerrero, Cali, was first rescheduled at Estadio Alfonso López, Bucaramanga and later for 19 May 2021, 22:00 local time at Estadio Ramón Tahuichi Aguilera, Santa Cruz de la Sierra (Bolivia) due to civil unrest in Colombia.)
Attendance: 0
Referee: Darío Herrera (Argentina)

25 May 2021
20:30 UTC−4

Cerro Porteño (Paraguay)	1–0	(Colombia) América de Cali
Giménez 5'	Report

Estadio General Pablo Rojas, Asunción
Attendance: 0
Referee: Néstor Pitana (Argentina)
25 May 2021
21:30 UTC−3

Atlético Mineiro (Brazil)	4–0	(Venezuela) Deportivo La Guaira
Savarino 28'; Marrony 44'; Hulk 50'; Nathan 90+4'	Report

Estádio Mineirão, Belo Horizonte
Attendance: 0
Referee: Nicolás Lamolina (Argentina)
