= 2021 Copa Libertadores qualifying stages =

The 2021 Copa Libertadores qualifying stages were played from 23 February to 15 April 2021. A total of 19 teams competed in the qualifying stages to decide four of the 32 places in the group stage of the 2021 Copa Libertadores.

The qualifying stages had been originally scheduled to be played from 16 February to 8 April 2021.

== Draw ==
The draw for the qualifying stages was held on 5 February 2021, 12:00 PYST (UTC−3), at the CONMEBOL Convention Centre in Luque, Paraguay.

Teams were seeded by their CONMEBOL Clubs ranking as of 1 February 2021 (shown in parentheses), taking into account the following three factors:

1. Performance in the last 10 years, taking into account Copa Libertadores and Copa Sudamericana results in the period 2011–2020.
2. Historical coefficient, taking into account Copa Libertadores and Copa Sudamericana results in the period 1960–2010 and 2002-2010 respectively.
3. Local tournament champion, with bonus points awarded to domestic league champions of the last 10 years

For the first stage, the six teams were drawn into three ties (E1–E3), with the teams from Pot 1 hosting the second leg.

First stage draw
Pot 1	Pot 2
(Paraguay) Guaraní (34); (Venezuela) Caracas (58); (Ecuador) Universidad Católica (112)	(Peru) Universidad César Vallejo (130); (Bolivia) Royal Pari (164); (Uruguay) Liverpool (165)

Notes

1. ^{URU} The identity of the team Uruguay 4 was not known at the time of the draw, and was seeded in Pot 2.

For the second stage, the 16 teams were drawn into eight ties (C1–C8), with the teams from Pot 1 hosting the second leg. Teams from the same association could not be drawn into the same tie, excluding the three winners of the first stage, which were seeded in Pot 2 and whose identity was not known at the time of the draw, and could be drawn into the same tie with another team from the same association.

Second stage draw
Pot 1	Pot 2
(Colombia) Atlético Nacional (7); (Paraguay) Libertad (14); (Argentina) San Lorenzo (15); (Ecuador) Independiente del Valle (20); (Colombia) Junior (27); (Bolivia) Bolívar (29); (Venezuela) Deportivo Lara (75); (Peru) Ayacucho (222)	(Brazil) Grêmio (3); (Brazil) Santos (9); Universidad de Chile (41); (Chile) Unión Española (61); (Uruguay) Montevideo Wanderers (76); First stage winner E1; First stage winner E2; First stage winner E3

Notes

1. ^{BRA} The identity of the teams Brazil 7 and Brazil 8 was not known at the time of the draw, and were seeded in Pot 2.
2. ^{CHI} The identity of the teams Chile 3 and Chile 4 was not known at the time of the draw, and were seeded in Pot 2.
3. ^{URU} The identity of the team Uruguay 3 was not known at the time of the draw, and was seeded in Pot 2.

For the third stage, the eight winners of the second stage were allocated without any draw into the following four ties (G1–G4), with the team in each tie with the higher CONMEBOL ranking hosting the second leg. As their identity was not known at the time of the draw, they could be drawn into the same tie with another team from the same association.

- Second stage winner C1 vs. Second stage winner C8
- Second stage winner C2 vs. Second stage winner C7
- Second stage winner C3 vs. Second stage winner C6
- Second stage winner C4 vs. Second stage winner C5

== Format ==
In the qualifying stages, each tie was played on a home-and-away two-legged basis. If tied on aggregate, the away goals rule was used. If still tied, extra time was not played, and a penalty shoot-out was used to determine the winner (Regulations Article 2.4.3).

== Bracket ==
The qualifying stages were structured as follows:

- First stage (6 teams): The three winners of the first stage advanced to the second stage to join the 13 teams which were given byes to the second stage.
- Second stage (16 teams): The eight winners of the second stage advanced to the third stage.
- Third stage (8 teams): The four winners of the third stage advanced to the group stage to join the 28 direct entrants. The four teams eliminated in the third stage entered the Copa Sudamericana group stage.

The bracket was decided based on the first stage draw and second stage draw, which was held on 5 February 2021.

=== Winner G1 ===
First stage
(Uruguay) Liverpool	2	0	2
(Ecuador) Universidad Católica	1	3	4
(Paraguay) Libertad	Bye
(Bolivia) Royal Pari	1	1	2
(Paraguay) Guaraní	4	1	5
(Colombia) Atlético Nacional	Bye

Second stage
(Ecuador) Universidad Católica	0	2	2
(Paraguay) Libertad	1	2	3
(Paraguay) Guaraní	0	0	0
(Colombia) Atlético Nacional	2	3	5

Third stage
(Paraguay) Libertad	1	1	2
(Colombia) Atlético Nacional	0	4	4

=== Winner G2 ===
First stage
(Chile) Unión Española	Bye
(Ecuador) Independiente del Valle	Bye
(Brazil) Grêmio	Bye
(Peru) Ayacucho	Bye

Second stage
(Chile) Unión Española	1	2	3
(Ecuador) Independiente del Valle	0	6	6
(Brazil) Grêmio	6	2	8
(Peru) Ayacucho	1	1	2

Third stage
(Ecuador) Independiente del Valle	2	2	4
(Brazil) Grêmio	1	1	2

=== Winner G3 ===
First stage
(Uruguay) Montevideo Wanderers	Bye
(Bolivia) Bolívar	Bye
(Peru) Universidad César Vallejo	0	0	0
(Venezuela) Caracas	0	2	2
(Colombia) Junior	Bye

Second stage
(Uruguay) Montevideo Wanderers	1	0	1
(Bolivia) Bolívar	0	5	5
(Venezuela) Caracas	1	1	2
(Colombia) Junior	2	3	5

Third stage
(Bolivia) Bolívar	2	0	2
(Colombia) Junior	1	3	4

=== Winner G4 ===
First stage
Universidad de Chile	Bye
(Argentina) San Lorenzo	Bye
(Brazil) Santos	Bye
(Venezuela) Deportivo Lara	Bye

Second stage
Universidad de Chile	1	0	1
(Argentina) San Lorenzo	1	2	3
(Brazil) Santos	2	1	3
(Venezuela) Deportivo Lara	1	1	2

Third stage
(Argentina) San Lorenzo	1	2	3
(Brazil) Santos	3	2	5

== First stage ==
The first legs were played on 23 and 24 February, and the second legs were played on 2 and 3 March 2021.

Team 1	Agg.	Team 2	1st leg	2nd leg
Liverpool (Uruguay)	2–4	(Ecuador) Universidad Católica	2–1	0–3
Universidad César Vallejo (Peru)	0–2	(Venezuela) Caracas	0–0	0–2
Royal Pari (Bolivia)	2–5	(Paraguay) Guaraní	1–4	1–1

=== Match E1 ===
23 February 2021
21:30 UTC−3

Liverpool (Uruguay)	2–1	(Ecuador) Universidad Católica
Dávila 68'; Correa 90+1'	Report	Tévez 27'

Parque Alfredo Víctor Viera, Montevideo (Note: Liverpool played their first stage home match at Parque Alfredo Víctor Viera, Montevideo instead of their regular stadium Estadio Belvedere, Montevideo, which did not meet CONMEBOL requirements.)
Attendance: 0
Referee: Nicolás Lamolina (Argentina)

2 March 2021
19:30 UTC−5

Universidad Católica (Ecuador)	3–0	(Uruguay) Liverpool
Tévez 37'; Chalá 44'; De los Santos 74'	Report

Estadio Olímpico Atahualpa, Quito
Attendance: 0
Referee: Alexis Herrera (Venezuela)

Universidad Católica won 4–2 on aggregate and advanced to the second stage (Match C1).

=== Match E2 ===
24 February 2021
17:15 UTC−5

Universidad César Vallejo (Peru)	0–0	(Venezuela) Caracas
	Report

Estadio Monumental, Lima (Note: Universidad César Vallejo played their first stage home match at Estadio Monumental, Lima instead of their regular stadium Estadio Mansiche, Trujillo, which did not meet CONMEBOL requirements.)
Attendance: 0
Referee: Marlon Vera (Ecuador)

3 March 2021
18:15 UTC−4

Caracas (Venezuela)	2–0	(Peru) Universidad César Vallejo
Echeverría 20' (pen.); R. Celis 90+5'	Report

Estadio Olímpico de la UCV, Caracas
Attendance: 0
Referee: Gery Vargas (Bolivia)

Caracas won 2–0 on aggregate and advanced to the second stage (Match C6).

=== Match E3 ===
24 February 2021
20:30 UTC−4

Royal Pari (Bolivia)	1–4	(Paraguay) Guaraní
Castillo 72'	Report	Marín 3', 45'; Florentín 19'; F. Fernández 74'

Estadio Ramón Tahuichi Aguilera, Santa Cruz de la Sierra
Attendance: 0
Referee: Kevin Ortega (Peru)

3 March 2021
21:30 UTC−3

Guaraní (Paraguay)	1–1	(Bolivia) Royal Pari
Benítez 58'	Report	Florentín 74' (o.g.)

Estadio Luis Alfonso Giagni, Villa Elisa (Note: Guaraní played their first stage home match at Estadio Luis Alfonso Giagni, Villa Elisa, and played their second stage home match at Estadio Defensores del Chaco, Asunción instead of their regular stadium Estadio Rogelio Livieres, Asunción, which did not meet CONMEBOL requirements.)
Attendance: 0
Referee: Rafael Traci (Brazil) (Note: Referee Rodolpho Toski from Brazil, who was originally assigned to the Guarani v Royal Pari match, was replaced by his countryman Rafael Traci.)

Guaraní won 5–2 on aggregate and advanced to the second stage (Match C8).

== Second stage ==
The first legs were played on 9–11 March, and the second legs were played on 16–18 March 2021.

Team 1	Agg.	Team 2	1st leg	2nd leg
Universidad Católica (Ecuador)	2–3	(Paraguay) Libertad	0–1	2–2
Grêmio (Brazil)	8–2	(Peru) Ayacucho	6–1	2–1
Montevideo Wanderers (Uruguay)	1–5	(Bolivia) Bolívar	1–0	0–5
Universidad de Chile	1–3	(Argentina) San Lorenzo	1–1	0–2
Santos (Brazil)	3–2	(Venezuela) Deportivo Lara	2–1	1–1
Caracas (Venezuela)	2–5	(Colombia) Junior	1–2	1–3
Unión Española (Chile)	3–6	(Ecuador) Independiente del Valle	1–0	2–6
Guaraní (Paraguay)	0–5	(Colombia) Atlético Nacional	0–2	0–3

=== Match C1 ===
10 March 2021
17:15 UTC−5

Universidad Católica (Ecuador)	0–1	(Paraguay) Libertad
	Report	Bogarín 38'

Estadio Olímpico Atahualpa, Quito
Attendance: 0
Referee: Bruno Arleu (Brazil)

17 March 2021
19:15 UTC−3

Libertad (Paraguay)	2–2	(Ecuador) Universidad Católica
Ferreira 32', 64'	Report	Chalá 61'; Tévez 82' (pen.)

Estadio Defensores del Chaco, Asunción (Note: Libertad played their home matches at Estadio Defensores del Chaco, Asunción instead of their regular stadium Estadio Dr. Nicolás Leoz, Asunción.)
Attendance: 0
Referee: Fernando Rapallini (Argentina)

Libertad won 3–2 on aggregate and advanced to the third stage (Match G1).

=== Match C2 ===
10 March 2021 (Note: The Grêmio v Ayacucho match was originally scheduled on 9 March 2021, 21:30 local time, but was re-scheduled to 10 March 2021, 21:30 local time.)
21:30 UTC−3

Grêmio (Brazil)	6–1	(Peru) Ayacucho
Braz 4'; Ferreira 28'; Diego Souza 33' (pen.), 41', 86'; Azevedo 79'	Report	Quina 73'

Arena do Grêmio, Porto Alegre
Attendance: 0
Referee: Augusto Aragón (Ecuador)

16 March 2021
19:30 UTC−5

Ayacucho (Peru)	1–2	(Brazil) Grêmio
Sosa 40'	Report	Ferreira 41'; Ricardinho 87'

Estadio Olímpico Atahualpa, Quito (Ecuador) (Note: The Ayacucho v Grêmio second stage match, originally scheduled to be played at Estadio Garcilaso, Cusco, was played at Estadio Olímpico Atahualpa, Quito (Ecuador) due to travel restrictions related to the COVID-19 pandemic between Peru and Brazil.)
Attendance: 0
Referee: Esteban Ostojich (Uruguay)

Grêmio won 8–2 on aggregate and advanced to the third stage (Match G2).

=== Match C3 ===
9 March 2021
19:15 UTC−3

Montevideo Wanderers (Uruguay)	1–0	(Bolivia) Bolívar
Rolón 55'	Report

Parque Alfredo Víctor Viera, Montevideo
Attendance: 0
Referee: Cristian Garay (Chile)

16 March 2021
18:15 UTC−4

Bolívar (Bolivia)	5–0	(Uruguay) Montevideo Wanderers
Ramos 4', 52'; Miranda 40'; Macaluso 57' (o.g.); Ábrego 90+4'	Report

Estadio Hernando Siles, La Paz
Attendance: 0
Referee: Guillermo Guerrero (Ecuador)

Bolívar won 5–1 on aggregate and advanced to the third stage (Match G3).

=== Match C4 ===
10 March 2021
21:30 UTC−3

Universidad de Chile	1–1	(Argentina) San Lorenzo
Henríquez 76'	Report	Di Santo 78'

Estadio Nacional Julio Martínez Prádanos, Santiago
Attendance: 0
Referee: Raphael Claus (Brazil)

17 March 2021
21:30 UTC−3

San Lorenzo (Argentina)	2–0	Universidad de Chile
Di Santo 13'; Á. Romero 59'	Report

Estadio Pedro Bidegain, Buenos Aires
Attendance: 0
Referee: Leodán González (Uruguay)

San Lorenzo won 3–1 on aggregate and advanced to the third stage (Match G4).

=== Match C5 ===
9 March 2021
19:15 UTC−3

Santos (Brazil)	2–1	(Venezuela) Deportivo Lara
Vinicius 50'; Kaiky 70'	Report	Anzola 52'

Estádio Urbano Caldeira, Santos
Attendance: 0
Referee: Andrés Matonte (Uruguay)

16 March 2021
18:15 UTC−4

Deportivo Lara (Venezuela)	1–1	(Brazil) Santos
Anzola 62'	Report	Soteldo 37'

Estadio Olímpico de la UCV, Caracas (Note: Deportivo Lara played their second stage home match at Estadio Olímpico de la UCV, Caracas instead of their regular stadium Estadio Metropolitano de Cabudare, Cabudare.)
Attendance: 0
Referee: Víctor Carrillo (Peru)

Santos won 3–2 on aggregate and advanced to the third stage (Match G4).

=== Match C6 ===
10 March 2021
20:30 UTC−4

Caracas (Venezuela)	1–2	(Colombia) Junior
Akinyoola 35'	Report	Borja 69'; Ditta 90+1'

Estadio Olímpico de la UCV, Caracas
Attendance: 0
Referee: Roberto Tobar (Chile)

17 March 2021
19:30 UTC−5

Junior (Colombia)	3–1	(Venezuela) Caracas
Borja 41'; Gutiérrez 75'; Pajoy 90+1'	Report	Akinyoola 86' (pen.)

Estadio Metropolitano Roberto Meléndez, Barranquilla
Attendance: 0
Referee: Mauro Vigliano (Argentina)

Junior won 5–2 on aggregate and advanced to the third stage (Match G3).

=== Match C7 ===
9 March 2021
21:30 UTC−3

Unión Española (Chile)	1–0	(Ecuador) Independiente del Valle
Caicedo 56' (o.g.)	Report

Estadio Santa Laura, Santiago
Attendance: 0
Referee: Wilton Sampaio (Brazil)

16 March 2021
19:30 UTC−5

Independiente del Valle (Ecuador)	6–2	(Chile) Unión Española
Vite 3'; Montenegro 15', 39', 90+9'; Faravelli 30' (pen.), 57'	Report	Méndez 56'; Rubio 61'

Estadio Rodrigo Paz Delgado, Quito (Note: Independiente del Valle played their second stage home match at Estadio Rodrigo Paz Delgado, Quito instead of their regular stadium Estadio Olímpico Atahualpa, Quito.)
Attendance: 0
Referee: Wilmar Roldán (Colombia)

Independiente del Valle won 6–3 on aggregate and advanced to the third stage (Match G2).

=== Match C8 ===
11 March 2021
21:30 UTC−3

Guaraní (Paraguay)	0–2	(Colombia) Atlético Nacional
	Report	Barrera 22'; Rovira 90+8'

Estadio Defensores del Chaco, Asunción
Attendance: 0
Referee: Jesús Valenzuela (Venezuela)

18 March 2021
19:30 UTC−5

Atlético Nacional (Colombia)	3–0	(Paraguay) Guaraní
Andrade 24', 52'; Barrera 39'	Report

Estadio Atanasio Girardot, Medellín
Attendance: 0
Referee: Néstor Pitana (Argentina)

Atlético Nacional won 5–0 on aggregate and advanced to the third stage (Match G1).

== Third stage ==
The first legs were played on 6–9 April, and the second legs were played on 13–15 April 2021.

Team 1	Agg.	Team 2	1st leg	2nd leg
Libertad (Paraguay)	2–4	(Colombia) Atlético Nacional	1–0	1–4
Independiente del Valle (Ecuador)	4–2	(Brazil) Grêmio	2–1	2–1
Bolívar (Bolivia)	2–4	(Colombia) Junior	2–1	0–3
San Lorenzo (Argentina)	3–5	(Brazil) Santos	1–3	2–2

=== Match G1 ===
7 April 2021
20:30 UTC−4

Libertad (Paraguay)	1–0	(Colombia) Atlético Nacional
Báez 78'	Report

Estadio Defensores del Chaco, Asunción
Attendance: 0
Referee: Facundo Tello (Argentina)

14 April 2021
19:30 UTC−5

Atlético Nacional (Colombia)	4–1	(Paraguay) Libertad
Barrera 16'; Perlaza 51'; Álvez 58'; Duque 74'	Report	Enciso 2'

Estadio Atanasio Girardot, Medellín
Attendance: 0
Referee: Roberto Tobar (Chile)

Atlético Nacional won 4–2 on aggregate and advanced to the group stage (Group F).

=== Match G2 ===
9 April 2021 (Note: The Independiente del Valle v Grêmio match, originally scheduled on 7 April 2021, 17:15 local time at Estadio Rodrigo Paz Delgado, Quito, was suspended by the Ecuadorian authorities in light of the COVID-19 pandemic. It was eventually re-scheduled to 9 April 2021, 18:15 local time at Estadio Defensores del Chaco, Asunción (Paraguay).)
18:15 UTC−4

Independiente del Valle (Ecuador)	2–1	(Brazil) Grêmio
Faravelli 53', 61' (pen.)	Report	Diego Souza 9'

Estadio Defensores del Chaco, Asunción (Paraguay)
Attendance: 0
Referee: Néstor Pitana (Argentina)

14 April 2021
19:15 UTC−3

Grêmio (Brazil)	1–2	(Ecuador) Independiente del Valle
Jean Pyerre 22'	Report	Ortiz 45+3', 66'

Arena do Grêmio, Porto Alegre
Attendance: 0
Referee: Patricio Loustau (Argentina)

Independiente del Valle won 4–2 on aggregate and advanced to the group stage (Group A).

=== Match G3 ===
8 April 2021
20:30 UTC−4

Bolívar (Bolivia)	2–1	(Colombia) Junior
Ramos 4'; Bejarano 48'	Report	Mera 10'

Estadio Hernando Siles, La Paz
Attendance: 0
Referee: Wilton Sampaio (Brazil)

15 April 2021
19:30 UTC−5

Junior (Colombia)	3–0	(Bolivia) Bolívar
Borja 12'; Pajoy 81'; Hinestroza 90+6'	Report

Estadio Metropolitano Roberto Meléndez, Barranquilla
Attendance: 0
Referee: Eber Aquino (Paraguay)

Junior won 4–2 on aggregate and advanced to the group stage (Group D).

=== Match G4 ===
6 April 2021
21:30 UTC−3

San Lorenzo (Argentina)	1–3	(Brazil) Santos
Á. Romero 72'	Report	Lucas Braga 7'; Marinho 45+1' (pen.); Ângelo 90+4'

Estadio Pedro Bidegain, Buenos Aires
Attendance: 0
Referee: Wilmar Roldán (Colombia)

13 April 2021
21:30 UTC−3

Santos (Brazil)	2–2	(Argentina) San Lorenzo
Marcos Leonardo 22'; Pará 57'	Report	Di Santo 59'; Á. Romero 78'

Estádio Nacional Mané Garrincha, Brasília (Note: Santos played their third stage home match at Estádio Nacional Mané Garrincha, Brasília instead of their regular stadium Estádio Urbano Caldeira, Santos.)
Attendance: 0
Referee: Esteban Ostojich (Uruguay)

Santos won 5–3 on aggregate and advanced to the group stage (Group C).
