= 2021 Copa Libertadores final stages =

The 2021 Copa Libertadores final stages were played from 13 July to 27 November 2021. A total of 16 teams competed in the final stages to decide the champions of the 2021 Copa Libertadores, with the final played in Montevideo, Uruguay at Estadio Centenario.

== Qualified teams ==
The winners and runners-up of each of the eight groups in the group stage advanced to the round of 16.

Group	Winners	Runners-up
A	(Brazilian Football Confederation) Palmeiras	(Argentine Football Association) Defensa y Justicia
B	(Brazilian Football Confederation) Internacional	(Paraguayan Football Association) Olimpia
C	(Ecuadorian Football Federation) Barcelona	(Argentine Football Association) Boca Juniors
D	(Brazilian Football Confederation) Fluminense	(Argentine Football Association) River Plate
E	(Argentine Football Association) Racing	(Brazilian Football Confederation) São Paulo
F	(Argentine Football Association) Argentinos Juniors	(Football Federation of Chile) Universidad Católica
G	(Brazilian Football Confederation) Flamengo	(Argentine Football Association) Vélez Sarsfield
H	(Brazilian Football Confederation) Atlético Mineiro	(Paraguayan Football Association) Cerro Porteño

=== Seeding ===
Starting from the round of 16, the teams are seeded according to their results in the group stage, with the group winners (Pot 1) seeded 1–8, and the group runners-up (Pot 2) seeded 9–16.

Seed	Grp	Team	Pld	W	D	L	GF	GA	GD	Pts	Round of 16 draw
1	H	(Brazilian Football Confederation) Atlético Mineiro	6	5	1	0	15	3	+12	16	Pot 1
2	A	(Brazilian Football Confederation) Palmeiras	6	5	0	1	20	7	+13	15	Pot 1
3	E	(Argentine Football Association) Racing	6	4	2	0	9	2	+7	14	Pot 1
4	C	(Ecuadorian Football Federation) Barcelona	6	4	1	1	10	3	+7	13	Pot 1
5	G	(Brazilian Football Confederation) Flamengo	6	3	3	0	14	9	+5	12	Pot 1
6	F	(Argentine Football Association) Argentinos Juniors	6	4	0	2	7	3	+4	12	Pot 1
7	D	(Brazilian Football Confederation) Fluminense	6	3	2	1	10	7	+3	11	Pot 1
8	B	(Brazilian Football Confederation) Internacional	6	3	1	2	12	5	+7	10	Pot 1
9	E	(Brazilian Football Confederation) São Paulo	6	3	2	1	9	2	+7	11	Pot 2
10	C	(Argentine Football Association) Boca Juniors	6	3	1	2	6	2	+4	10	Pot 2
11	G	(Argentine Football Association) Vélez Sarsfield	6	3	1	2	10	8	+2	10	Pot 2
12	H	(Paraguayan Football Association) Cerro Porteño	6	3	1	2	4	5	−1	10	Pot 2
13	A	(Argentine Football Association) Defensa y Justicia	6	2	3	1	11	8	+3	9	Pot 2
14	D	(Argentine Football Association) River Plate	6	2	3	1	7	7	0	9	Pot 2
15	F	(Football Federation of Chile) Universidad Católica	6	3	0	3	6	6	0	9	Pot 2
16	B	(Paraguayan Football Association) Olimpia	6	3	0	3	13	14	−1	9	Pot 2

Source: CONMEBOL
Rules for classification: 1) Higher position in group; 2) Points; 3) Goal difference; 4) Goals scored; 5) Away goals scored; 6) CONMEBOL ranking (Regulations Article 22.i).

== Format ==
Starting from the round of 16, the teams played a single-elimination tournament with the following rules:

- In the round of 16, quarter-finals and semi-finals, each tie was played on a home-and-away two-legged basis, with the higher-seeded team hosting the second leg (Regulations Article 2.2.3.2). If tied on aggregate, the away goals rule was used. If still tied, extra time was not played, and a penalty shoot-out was used to determine the winners (Regulations Article 2.4.3).
- The final was played as a single match at a venue pre-selected by CONMEBOL, with the higher-seeded team designated as the "home" team for administrative purposes (Regulations Article 2.2.3.5). If tied after regulation, 30 minutes of extra time were played. If still tied after extra time, a penalty shoot-out was used to determine the winners (Regulations Article 2.4.4).

== Draw ==
The draw for the round of 16 was held on 1 June 2021, 12:00 PYT (UTC−4), at the CONMEBOL Convention Center in Luque, Paraguay. For the round of 16, the 16 teams were drawn into eight ties (A–H) between a group winner (Pot 1) and a group runner-up (Pot 2), with the group winners hosting the second leg. Teams from the same association or the same group could be drawn into the same tie (Regulations Article 2.2.3.2).

== Bracket ==
The bracket starting from the round of 16 was determined as follows:

Round	Matchups
Round of 16	(Group winners host second leg, matchups decided by draw): Match A; Match B; Match C; Match D; Match E; Match F; Match G; Match H
Quarter-finals	(Higher-seeded team host second leg): Match S1: Winner A vs. Winner H; Match S2: Winner B vs. Winner G; Match S3: Winner C vs. Winner F; Match S4: Winner D vs. Winner E
Semi-finals	(Higher-seeded team host second leg): Match F1: Winner S1 vs. Winner S4; Match F2: Winner S2 vs. Winner S3
Final	(Higher-seeded team designated as "home" team): Winner F1 vs. Winner F2

The bracket was decided based on the round of 16 draw, which was held on 1 June 2021.

Round of 16
9	(Brazilian Football Confederation) São Paulo	1	3	4
3	(Argentine Football Association) Racing	1	1	2
15	(Football Federation of Chile) Universidad Católica	0	0	0
2	(Brazilian Football Confederation) Palmeiras	1	1	2
14	(Argentine Football Association) River Plate	1	2	3
6	(Argentine Football Association) Argentinos Juniors	1	0	1
10	(Argentine Football Association) Boca Juniors	0	0	0 (1)
1	(Brazilian Football Confederation) Atlético Mineiro (p)	0	0	0 (3)
16	(Paraguayan Football Association) Olimpia (p)	0	0	0 (5)
8	(Brazilian Football Confederation) Internacional	0	0	0 (4)
13	(Argentine Football Association) Defensa y Justicia	0	1	1
5	(Brazilian Football Confederation) Flamengo	1	4	5
12	(Paraguayan Football Association) Cerro Porteño	0	0	0
7	(Brazilian Football Confederation) Fluminense	2	1	3
11	(Argentine Football Association) Vélez Sarsfield	1	1	2
4	(Ecuadorian Football Federation) Barcelona	0	3	3

Quarter-finals
9	(Brazilian Football Confederation) São Paulo	1	0	1
2	(Brazilian Football Confederation) Palmeiras	1	3	4
14	(Argentine Football Association) River Plate	0	0	0
1	(Brazilian Football Confederation) Atlético Mineiro	1	3	4
16	(Paraguayan Football Association) Olimpia	1	1	2
5	(Brazilian Football Confederation) Flamengo	4	5	9
7	(Brazilian Football Confederation) Fluminense	2	1	3
4	(Ecuadorian Football Federation) Barcelona (a)	2	1	3

Semi-finals
2	(Brazilian Football Confederation) Palmeiras (a)	0	1	1
1	(Brazilian Football Confederation) Atlético Mineiro	0	1	1
5	(Brazilian Football Confederation) Flamengo	2	2	4
4	(Ecuadorian Football Federation) Barcelona	0	0	0

Final
27 November – Montevideo
2	(Brazilian Football Confederation) Palmeiras (a.e.t.)	2
5	(Brazilian Football Confederation) Flamengo	1

== Round of 16 ==
The first legs were played on 13–15 July, and the second legs were played on 20–22 July and 3 August 2021.

Team 1	Agg.	Team 2	1st leg	2nd leg
Defensa y Justicia (Argentina)	1–5	(Brazil) Flamengo	0–1	1–4
Boca Juniors (Argentina)	0–0 (1–3 p)	(Brazil) Atlético Mineiro	0–0	0–0
Universidad Católica (Chile)	0–2	(Brazil) Palmeiras	0–1	0–1
Cerro Porteño (Paraguay)	0–3	(Brazil) Fluminense	0–2	0–1
Vélez Sarsfield (Argentina)	2–3	(Ecuador) Barcelona	1–0	1–3
São Paulo (Brazil)	4–2	(Argentina) Racing	1–1	3–1
River Plate (Argentina)	3–1	(Argentina) Argentinos Juniors	1–1	2–0
Olimpia (Paraguay)	0–0 (5–4 p)	(Brazil) Internacional	0–0	0–0

=== Match A ===
14 July 2021
21:30 UTC−3

Defensa y Justicia (Argentine Football Association)	0–1	(Brazilian Football Confederation) Flamengo
	Report	Michael 21'

Estadio Norberto Tomaghello, Gobernador Costa
Attendance: 0
Referee: Eber Aquino (Paraguay)

21 July 2021
21:30 UTC−3

Flamengo (Brazilian Football Confederation)	4–1	(Argentine Football Association) Defensa y Justicia
Rodrigo Caio 9'; De Arrascaeta 66'; Vitinho 83', 90+4'	Report	Loaiza 41'

Estádio Nacional Mané Garrincha, Brasília (Note: Flamengo played their round of 16 and quarter-final home matches at Estádio Nacional Mané Garrincha, Brasília, instead of their regular stadium Estádio do Maracanã, Rio de Janeiro.)
Attendance: 5,518
Referee: Roberto Tobar (Chile)

Flamengo won 5–1 on aggregate and advanced to the quarter-finals (Match S1).

=== Match B ===
13 July 2021
19:15 UTC−3

Boca Juniors (Argentine Football Association)	0–0	(Brazilian Football Confederation) Atlético Mineiro
	Report

Estadio Alberto J. Armando, Buenos Aires
Attendance: 0
Referee: Andrés Rojas (Colombia)

20 July 2021
19:15 UTC−3

Atlético Mineiro (Brazilian Football Confederation)	0–0	(Argentine Football Association) Boca Juniors
	Report
Penalties
Hulk (penalty missed); Fernández (penalty scored); Alonso (penalty scored); Hyoran (penalty missed); Everson (penalty scored)	3–1	(penalty scored) Rojo; (penalty missed) Villa; (penalty missed) Rolón; (penalty missed) Izquierdoz

Estádio Mineirão, Belo Horizonte
Attendance: 0
Referee: Esteban Ostojich (Uruguay)

Tied 0–0 on aggregate, Atlético Mineiro won on penalties and advanced to the quarter-finals (Match S2).

=== Match C ===
14 July 2021
18:15 UTC−4

Universidad Católica (Football Federation of Chile)	0–1	(Brazilian Football Confederation) Palmeiras
	Report	Veiga 42' (pen.)

Estadio San Carlos de Apoquindo, Santiago (Note: The Universidad Católica v Palmeiras match, originally scheduled at Estadio Nacional Julio Martínez Prádanos, Santiago, was re-scheduled at Universidad Católica's regular stadium Estadio San Carlos de Apoquindo, Santiago.)
Attendance: 0
Referee: Andrés Matonte (Uruguay)

21 July 2021
19:15 UTC−3

Palmeiras (Brazilian Football Confederation)	1–0	(Football Federation of Chile) Universidad Católica
Rocha 36'	Report

Allianz Parque, São Paulo
Attendance: 0
Referee: Alexis Herrera (Venezuela)

Palmeiras won 2–0 on aggregate and advanced to the quarter-finals (Match S3).

=== Match D ===
13 July 2021
18:15 UTC−4

Cerro Porteño (Paraguayan Football Association)	0–2	(Brazilian Football Confederation) Fluminense
	Report	Nenê 49'; Egídio 61'

Estadio General Pablo Rojas, Asunción
Attendance: 0
Referee: Facundo Tello (Argentina)

3 August 2021 (Note: The Fluminense v Cerro Porteño match, originally scheduled for 20 July 2021, was rescheduled for 3 August 2021 due to the passing of Alexandro Javier Arce, son of Cerro Porteño manager Francisco Arce.)
19:15 UTC−3

Fluminense (Brazilian Football Confederation)	1–0	(Paraguayan Football Association) Cerro Porteño
Fred 24' (pen.)	Report

Estádio do Maracanã, Rio de Janeiro
Attendance: 0
Referee: Wilmar Roldán (Colombia)

Fluminense won 3–0 on aggregate and advanced to the quarter-finals (Match S4).

=== Match E ===
14 July 2021
19:15 UTC−3

Vélez Sarsfield (Argentine Football Association)	1–0	(Ecuadorian Football Federation) Barcelona
Lucero 7'	Report

Estadio José Amalfitani, Buenos Aires
Attendance: 0
Referee: Raphael Claus (Brazil)

21 July 2021
17:15 UTC−5

Barcelona (Ecuadorian Football Federation)	3–1	(Argentine Football Association) Vélez Sarsfield
Preciado 24'; Cortez 69' (pen.); Perlaza 80'	Report	Lucero 48'

Estadio Monumental Isidro Romero Carbo, Guayaquil
Attendance: 0
Referee: Piero Maza (Chile)

Barcelona won 3–2 on aggregate and advanced to the quarter-finals (Match S4).

=== Match F ===
13 July 2021
21:30 UTC−3

São Paulo (Brazilian Football Confederation)	1–1	(Argentine Football Association) Racing
Bueno 35'	Report	Copetti 45+1'

Estádio do Morumbi, São Paulo
Attendance: 0
Referee: Jhon Ospina (Colombia)

20 July 2021
21:30 UTC−3

Racing (Argentine Football Association)	1–3	(Brazilian Football Confederation) São Paulo
Correa 63'	Report	Rigoni 44', 57'; Marquinhos 48'

Estadio Presidente Juan Domingo Perón, Avellaneda
Attendance: 0
Referee: Gustavo Tejera (Uruguay)

São Paulo won 4–2 on aggregate and advanced to the quarter-finals (Match S3).

=== Match G ===
14 July 2021
21:30 UTC−3

River Plate (Argentine Football Association)	1–1	(Argentine Football Association) Argentinos Juniors
Suárez 10'	Report	Hauche 40'

Estadio Monumental Antonio Vespucio Liberti, Buenos Aires
Attendance: 0
Referee: Bruno Arleu (Brazil)

21 July 2021
21:30 UTC−3

Argentinos Juniors (Argentine Football Association)	0–2	(Argentine Football Association) River Plate
	Report	Romero 35', 54'

Estadio Diego Armando Maradona, Buenos Aires
Attendance: 0
Referee: Eber Aquino (Paraguay)

River Plate won 3–1 on aggregate and advanced to the quarter-finals (Match S2).

=== Match H ===
15 July 2021
20:30 UTC−4

Olimpia (Paraguayan Football Association)	0–0	(Brazilian Football Confederation) Internacional
	Report

Estadio Manuel Ferreira, Asunción
Attendance: 0
Referee: Patricio Loustau (Argentina)

22 July 2021
21:30 UTC−3

Internacional (Brazilian Football Confederation)	0–0	(Paraguayan Football Association) Olimpia
	Report
Penalties
Edenílson (penalty scored); Boschilia (penalty scored); Moisés (penalty scored); Maurício (penalty scored); Thiago Galhardo (penalty missed)	4–5	(penalty scored) Silva; (penalty scored) Pitta; (penalty scored) Ojeda; (penalty scored) Ortiz; (penalty scored) D. González

Estádio Beira-Rio, Porto Alegre
Attendance: 0
Referee: Christian Ferreyra (Uruguay)

Tied 0–0 on aggregate, Olimpia won on penalties and advanced to the quarter-finals (Match S1).

== Quarter-finals ==
The first legs were played on 10–12 August, and the second legs were played on 17–19 August 2021.

Team 1	Agg.	Team 2	1st leg	2nd leg
Olimpia (Paraguay)	2–9	(Brazil) Flamengo	1–4	1–5
River Plate (Argentina)	0–4	(Brazil) Atlético Mineiro	0–1	0–3
São Paulo (Brazil)	1–4	(Brazil) Palmeiras	1–1	0–3
Fluminense (Brazil)	3–3 (a)	(Ecuador) Barcelona	2–2	1–1

=== Match S1 ===
11 August 2021
18:15 UTC−4

Olimpia (Paraguayan Football Association)	1–4	(Brazilian Football Confederation) Flamengo
Torres 45+14'	Report	De Arrascaeta 16'; Gabriel Barbosa 45+12' (pen.), 52'; Vitinho 90+1'

Estadio Manuel Ferreira, Asunción
Attendance: 1,200
Referee: Fernando Rapallini (Argentina)

18 August 2021
19:15 UTC−3

Flamengo (Brazilian Football Confederation)	5–1	(Paraguayan Football Association) Olimpia
Gabriel Barbosa 30', 77'; Bruno Henrique 36'; Arão 49'; Salcedo 55' (o.g.)	Report	Recalde 45'

Estádio Nacional Mané Garrincha, Brasília
Attendance: 11,211
Referee: Jesús Valenzuela (Venezuela)

Flamengo won 9–2 on aggregate and advanced to the semi-finals (Match F1).

=== Match S2 ===
11 August 2021
21:30 UTC−3

River Plate (Argentine Football Association)	0–1	(Brazilian Football Confederation) Atlético Mineiro
	Report	Fernández 58'

Estadio Monumental Antonio Vespucio Liberti, Buenos Aires
Attendance: 0
Referee: Jesús Valenzuela (Venezuela)

18 August 2021
21:30 UTC−3

Atlético Mineiro (Brazilian Football Confederation)	3–0	(Argentine Football Association) River Plate
Zaracho 22', 61'; Hulk 34'	Report

Estádio Mineirão, Belo Horizonte
Attendance: 17,030
Referee: Roberto Tobar (Chile)

Atlético Mineiro won 4–0 on aggregate and advanced to the semi-finals (Match F2).

=== Match S3 ===
10 August 2021
21:30 UTC−3

São Paulo (Brazilian Football Confederation)	1–1	(Brazilian Football Confederation) Palmeiras
Luan 54'	Report	Patrick 74'

Estádio do Morumbi, São Paulo
Attendance: 0
Referee: Néstor Pitana (Argentina)

17 August 2021
21:30 UTC−3

Palmeiras (Brazilian Football Confederation)	3–0	(Brazilian Football Confederation) São Paulo
Veiga 10'; Dudu 67'; Patrick 78'	Report

Allianz Parque, São Paulo
Attendance: 0
Referee: Wilmar Roldán (Colombia)

Palmeiras won 4–1 on aggregate and advanced to the semi-finals (Match F2).

=== Match S4 ===
12 August 2021
21:30 UTC−3

Fluminense (Brazilian Football Confederation)	2–2	(Ecuadorian Football Federation) Barcelona
Teixeira 26'; Fred 90+5' (pen.)	Report	Preciado 69'; Cortez 88' (pen.)

Estádio do Maracanã, Rio de Janeiro
Attendance: 0
Referee: Alexis Herrera (Venezuela)

19 August 2021
19:30 UTC−5

Barcelona (Ecuadorian Football Federation)	1–1	(Brazilian Football Confederation) Fluminense
Mastriani 73'	Report	Fred 90+8' (pen.)

Estadio Monumental Isidro Romero Carbo, Guayaquil
Attendance: 0
Referee: Esteban Ostojich (Uruguay)

Tied 3–3 on aggregate, Barcelona won on away goals and advanced to the semi-finals (Match F1).

== Semi-finals ==
The first legs were played on 21 and 22 September, and the second legs were played on 28 and 29 September 2021.

Team 1	Agg.	Team 2	1st leg	2nd leg
Flamengo (Brazil)	4–0	(Ecuador) Barcelona	2–0	2–0
Palmeiras (Brazil)	1–1 (a)	(Brazil) Atlético Mineiro	0–0	1–1

=== Match F1 ===
22 September 2021
21:30 UTC−3

Flamengo (Brazilian Football Confederation)	2–0	(Ecuadorian Football Federation) Barcelona
Bruno Henrique 21', 38'	Report

Estádio do Maracanã, Rio de Janeiro (Note: The Flamengo v Barcelona match, originally scheduled at Estádio Nacional Mané Garrincha, Brasília, was re-scheduled at Flamengo's regular stadium Estádio do Maracanã, Rio de Janeiro.)
Attendance: 22,193
Referee: Andrés Cunha (Uruguay)

29 September 2021
19:30 UTC−5

Barcelona (Ecuadorian Football Federation)	0–2	(Brazilian Football Confederation) Flamengo
	Report	Bruno Henrique 18', 50'

Estadio Monumental Isidro Romero Carbo, Guayaquil
Attendance: 11,642
Referee: Roberto Tobar (Chile)

Flamengo won 4–0 on aggregate and advanced to the final.

=== Match F2 ===
21 September 2021
21:30 UTC−3

Palmeiras (Brazilian Football Confederation)	0–0	(Brazilian Football Confederation) Atlético Mineiro
	Report

Allianz Parque, São Paulo
Attendance: 0
Referee: Patricio Loustau (Argentina)

28 September 2021
21:30 UTC−3

Atlético Mineiro (Brazilian Football Confederation)	1–1	(Brazilian Football Confederation) Palmeiras
Vargas 52'	Report	Dudu 68'

Estádio Mineirão, Belo Horizonte
Attendance: 18,350
Referee: Wilmar Roldán (Colombia)

Tied 1–1 on aggregate, Palmeiras won on away goals and advanced to the final.

== Final ==
The final was played on 27 November 2021 at Estadio Centenario in Montevideo.

27 November 2021
17:00 UTC−3

Palmeiras (Brazil)	2–1 (a.e.t.)	(Brazil) Flamengo
Veiga 5'; Deyverson 95'	Report	Gabriel Barbosa 72'

Estadio Centenario, Montevideo
Attendance: 55,023
Referee: Néstor Pitana (Argentina)
