= 2025 Atlético Tucumán season =

Atlético Tucumán
2025 season
- Manager: Lucas Pusineri (from 9 February)
- Stadium: Estadio Monumental José Fierro
- Primera División: Torneo Apertura: 10th
- Copa Argentina: Round of 32
- Top goalscorer: Mateo Coronel (4)
- Average home league attendance: 26,652
- Biggest win: Atlético Tucumán 5–0 Sarmiento

The 2025 season is the 123rd in the history of Atlético Tucumán and the club’s tenth consecutive in the Argentine top flight. They are also participating in the Copa Argentina, having begun their campaign with a first-round victory over All Boys.

== Transfers ==
=== In ===
Pos.	Player	Transferred from	Fee	Date	Source
MF	(Argentina) Kevin Ortiz	(Argentina) Rosario Central	Loan	25 June 2025	

== Competitions ==
=== Primera División ===
==== Torneo Apertura ====
Pos	Team	Pld	W	D	L	GF	GA	GD	Pts	Qualification
8	Instituto	16	5	3	8	16	20	−4	18	Advance to round of 16
9	Godoy Cruz	16	3	8	5	8	18	−10	17	
10	Atlético Tucumán	16	5	1	10	17	21	−4	16	
11	Gimnasia y Esgrima (LP)	16	4	4	8	9	18	−9	16	
12	Sarmiento (J)	16	2	9	5	11	19	−8	15	

Source: AFA

===== Results by round =====
Round	1	2	3	4	5	6
Ground	A	A	H	A	H	A
Result	W	L	L	L	W	D
Position						

A = Away; H = Home; W = Win; D = Draw; L = Loss

24 January 2025 1	San Martín	0–1	Atlético Tucumán

31 January 2025 2	Central Córdoba	2–0	Atlético Tucumán

5 February 2025 3	Atlético Tucumán	0–3	Deportivo Riestra

8 February 2025 4	Rosario Central	3–1	Atlético Tucumán

14 February 2025 5	Atlético Tucumán	5–0	Sarmiento

17 February 2025 6	Talleres	1–1	Atlético Tucumán

23 February 2025 7	Atlético Tucumán	0–1	Gimnasia y Esgrima

3 March 2025 8	Atlético Tucumán	1–2	Newell's Old Boys

9 March 2025 9	River Plate	1–0	Atlético Tucumán

17 March 2025 10	Atlético Tucumán	1–2	Vélez Sarsfield

28 March 2025 11	Platense	2–1	Atlético Tucumán

7 April 2025 12	Atlético Tucumán	3–2	Instituto

12 April 2025 13	San Lorenzo	1–0	Atlético Tucumán

28 April 2025 15	Godoy Cruz	1–0	Atlético Tucumán

30 April 2025 14	Atlético Tucumán	2–0	Independiente

3 May 2025 16	Atlético Tucumán	1–0	Lanús

==== Torneo Clausura ====
===== League table =====
Pos	Team	Pld	W	D	L	GF	GA	GD	Pts
10	San Martín (SJ)	16	4	7	5	13	16	−3	19
11	Independiente	16	4	6	6	14	13	+1	18
12	Atlético Tucumán	16	5	3	8	17	22	−5	18
13	Instituto	16	3	7	6	9	17	−8	16
14	Godoy Cruz	16	1	9	6	11	19	−8	12

Source: AFA

===== Results by round =====
Round	1
Ground	
Result	
Position	

A = Away; H = Home; W = Win; D = Draw; L = Loss

===== Matches =====
13 July 2025 1	Atlético Tucumán	2–1	San Martín	Tucumán
16:30 UTC−3	Nicola 4'; Laméndola 90+5'	Report	Ferreira 90+1' (o.g.)	Stadium: Estadio Monumental José Fierro

18 July 2025 2	Atlético Tucumán	1–1	Central Córdoba	Tucumán
21:30 UTC−3	Díaz 19'	Report	Perelló 61'	Stadium: Estadio Monumental José Fierro

28 July 2025 3	Deportivo Riestra	1–0	Atlético Tucumán	Buenos Aires
16:00 UTC−3	Herrera 78' (pen.)	Report		Stadium: Estadio Guillermo Laza

9 August 2025 4	Atlético Tucumán	0–0	Rosario Central	Tucumán
20:45 UTC−3		Report		Stadium: Estadio Monumental José Fierro

18 August 2025 5	Sarmiento	2–2	Atlético Tucumán	Junín
19:00 UTC−3	Ardaiz 6', 45'	Report	Coronel 87'; Auzuqui 90+3'	Stadium: Estadio Eva Perón; Referee: Jorge Ignacio Baliño

23 August 2025 6	Atlético Tucumán	3–0	Talleres	Tucumán
20:00 UTC−3	Díaz 15'; Brizuela 31'; Sánchez 47'	Report		Stadium: Estadio Monumental José Fierro

1 September 2025 7	Gimnasia y Esgrima	1–0	Atlético Tucumán	La Plata
14:00 UTC−3	Martínez 54' (o.g.)	Report		Stadium: Estadio Juan Carmelo Zerillo

=== Copa Argentina ===
2 April 2025 Round of 64	Atlético Tucumán	2–1	All Boys	Rafaela
16:00	Cabrera 61'; Díaz 90+3'	Report	Campostrini 90+5'	Stadium: Estadio Nuevo Monumental; Referee: Andrés Merlos

23 July 2025 Round of 32	Boca Juniors	1–2	Atlético Tucumán	Santiago del Estero
21:10	Cavani 90+7'	Report	Ferreira 65'; Bajamich 75'	Stadium: Único Madre de Ciudades; Referee: Hernán Mastrángelo

13 August 2025 Round of 16	Atlético Tucumán	2–3	Newell's Old Boys	Salta
19:30	Brizuela 31'; Coronel 36'	Report	Lollo 11'; Maroni 39'; González 60'	Stadium: Padre Martearena; Referee: Ariel Penel
