= El Paraíso, Buenos Aires =

El Paraíso
- Town
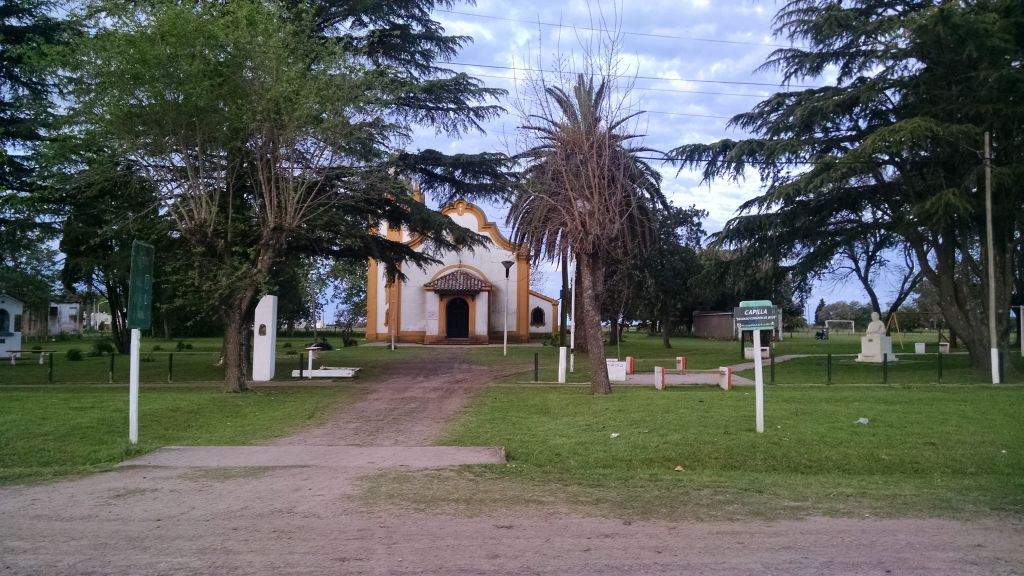

- Location within Buenos Aires Province
- Coordinates: 33°34′S 59°59′W
- Country: Argentina
- Province: Buenos Aires
- Partidos: Ramallo
- Established: 1883
- Elevation: 30 m (98 ft)

Population (2001 Census)
  - Total: 401
- Time zone: UTC−3 (ART)
- CPA Base: B 3407
- Climate: Dfc

El Paraíso is a town located in the Ramallo Partido in the province of Buenos Aires, Argentina. The town consists of 16 blocks.

== Geography ==
El Paraíso is located 11 km (6.8 mi) from the town of Ramallo and 260 km (160 mi) from the city and provincial capital of La Plata.

== History ==
The town was founded in 1883, and a railway station with rail service began three years later, in 1886. The area was previously known as "Del Medio". Service was operated by the Ferrocarril Central Argentina.

== Population ==
According to INDEC, which collects population data for the country, the town had a population of 401 people as of the 2001 census.
