= Villa General Savio =

- Town
- Location within Buenos Aires Province
- Coordinates: 33°26′S 60°08′W
- Country: Argentina
- Province: Buenos Aires
- Partidos: Ramallo
- Established: 1892
- Elevation: 20 m (66 ft)

Population (2001 Census)
  - Total: 1,073
- Time zone: UTC−3 (ART)
- CPA Base: B 2912
- Climate: Dfc

Villa General Savio is a town located in the Ramallo Partido in the province of Buenos Aires, Argentina.

== Geography ==
Villa General Savio is located 223 km (139 mi) from the city of Buenos Aires.

== History ==
The town was founded in 1892 following the construction of a rail station which provided regular service to the town until the 1990s.

== Economy ==
Many residents in Villa General Savio are employed in naval or agricultural industries due to the town's proximity to Ramallo and the Paraná River.

== Population ==
According to INDEC, which collects population data for the country, the town had a population of 1,073 people as of the 2001 census.
