= 2021 Copa Sudamericana =

Copa CONMEBOL Sudamericana 2021
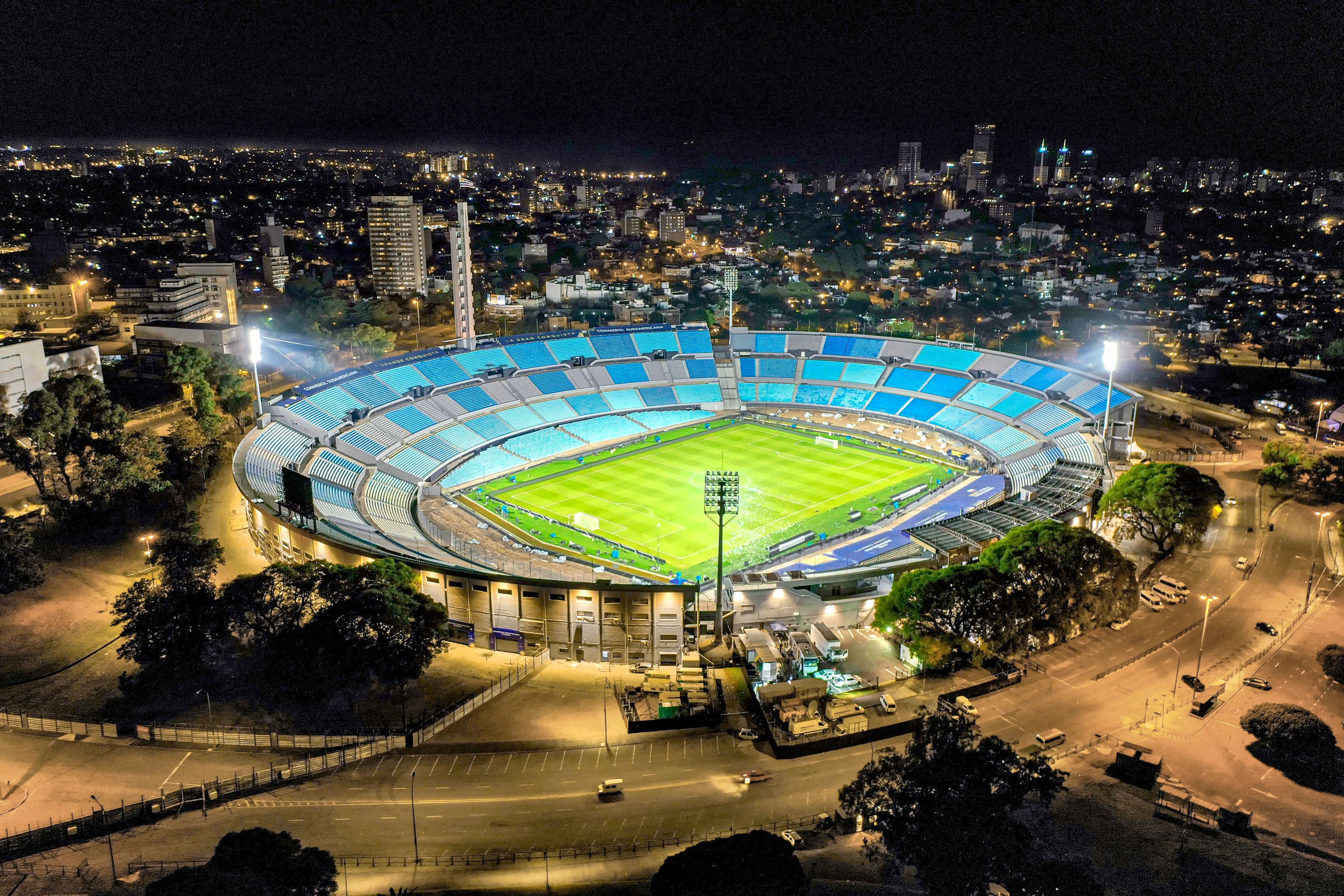
- The Estadio Centenario in Montevideo hosted the final

Tournament details
- Dates: 16 March – 20 November 2021
- Teams: 44+12 (from 10 associations)

Final positions
- Champions: (Brazil) Athletico Paranaense (2nd title)
- Runners-up: (Brazil) Red Bull Bragantino

Tournament statistics
- Matches played: 157
- Goals scored: 389 (2.48 per match)
- Top scorer: (Uruguay) Agustín Álvarez Martínez (10 goals)

The 2021 Copa CONMEBOL Sudamericana was the 20th edition of the CONMEBOL Sudamericana (also referred to as the Copa Sudamericana, or Portuguese: Copa Sul-Americana), South America's secondary club football tournament organized by CONMEBOL.

Starting from this season, teams had to be in the top division of their member association to play in South American club competitions, except for teams which were champions of the qualifying tournaments or cups.

On 14 May 2020, CONMEBOL announced the candidate venues for the 2021, 2022 and 2023 club competition finals. On 13 May 2021, CONMEBOL announced that the final would be played at the Estadio Centenario in Montevideo, Uruguay on 6 November 2021, but on 27 July 2021 the final was eventually confirmed to have been rescheduled to 20 November 2021.

Brazilian club Athletico Paranaense defeated fellow Brazilian club Red Bull Bragantino by a 1–0 score in the final to win their second tournament title. As winners of the 2021 Copa Sudamericana, Athletico Paranaense earned the right to play against the winners of the 2021 Copa Libertadores in the 2022 Recopa Sudamericana. They also automatically qualified for the 2022 Copa Libertadores group stage.

Defensa y Justicia were the defending champions, but did not play this edition since they qualified for the 2021 Copa Libertadores group stage as Copa Sudamericana champions and later advanced to the knockout stage.

== Format changes ==
On 2 October 2020, CONMEBOL's Council approved the implementation of format changes to the Copa Sudamericana starting from this edition, aimed at ensuring that each of the countries is better represented in the different stages of the competition. The following changes were implemented:

- The tournament was expanded from 54 to 56 teams, with all four Copa Libertadores third stage losers entering the competition instead of the two best teams eliminated.
- In the first stage, teams from all associations other than Argentina and Brazil played against a team from their same association in double-legged ties with the winners qualifying for a 32-team group stage, ensuring that at least two teams from each association will take part in the group stage.
- A group stage was included, with teams from Argentina and Brazil directly entering the Copa Sudamericana entering the competition at this stage, joining the 16 first stage winners and the four teams eliminated in the Copa Libertadores third stage. The winners of each group qualified for the round of 16.
- The eight third-placed teams of the Copa Libertadores group stage entered the competition at the round of 16.

== Teams ==
The following 44 teams from the 10 CONMEBOL associations qualified for the tournament:

- Argentina and Brazil: 6 berths each
- All other associations: 4 berths each

The entry stage was determined as follows:

- Group stage: 12 teams (teams from Argentina and Brazil)
- First stage: 32 teams (teams from all other associations)

| Association | Team (Berth) | Entry stage | Qualification method |
|---|---|---|---|
| Argentina (6 berths) | Newell's Old Boys (Argentina 1) | Group stage | 2019–20 Superliga Argentina and 2020 Copa de la Superliga aggregate table best team not qualified for 2021 Copa Libertadores |
| Argentina (6 berths) | Talleres (Argentina 2) | Group stage | 2019–20 Superliga Argentina and 2020 Copa de la Superliga aggregate table 2nd best team not qualified for 2021 Copa Libertadores |
| Argentina (6 berths) | Lanús (Argentina 3) | Group stage | 2019–20 Superliga Argentina and 2020 Copa de la Superliga aggregate table 3rd best team not qualified for 2021 Copa Libertadores |
| Argentina (6 berths) | Rosario Central (Argentina 4) | Group stage | 2019–20 Superliga Argentina and 2020 Copa de la Superliga aggregate table 4th best team not qualified for 2021 Copa Libertadores |
| Argentina (6 berths) | Arsenal (Argentina 5) | Group stage | 2019–20 Superliga Argentina and 2020 Copa de la Superliga aggregate table 5th best team not qualified for 2021 Copa Libertadores |
| Argentina (6 berths) | Independiente (Argentina 6) | Group stage | 2019–20 Superliga Argentina and 2020 Copa de la Superliga aggregate table 6th best team not qualified for 2021 Copa Libertadores |
| Bolivia (4 berths) | Jorge Wilstermann (Bolivia 1) | First stage | 2020 Apertura best team not qualified for 2021 Copa Libertadores |
| Bolivia (4 berths) | Guabirá (Bolivia 2) | First stage | 2020 Apertura 2nd best team not qualified for 2021 Copa Libertadores |
| Bolivia (4 berths) | Nacional Potosí (Bolivia 3) | First stage | 2020 Apertura 3rd best team not qualified for 2021 Copa Libertadores |
| Bolivia (4 berths) | Atlético Palmaflor (Bolivia 4) | First stage | 2020 Apertura 4th best team not qualified for 2021 Copa Libertadores |
| Brazil (6 berths) | Athletico Paranaense (Brazil 1) | Group stage | 2020 Campeonato Brasileiro Série A best team not qualified for 2021 Copa Libertadores |
| Brazil (6 berths) | Red Bull Bragantino (Brazil 2) | Group stage | 2020 Campeonato Brasileiro Série A 2nd best team not qualified for 2021 Copa Libertadores |
| Brazil (6 berths) | Ceará (Brazil 3) | Group stage | 2020 Campeonato Brasileiro Série A 3rd best team not qualified for 2021 Copa Libertadores |
| Brazil (6 berths) | Corinthians (Brazil 4) | Group stage | 2020 Campeonato Brasileiro Série A 4th best team not qualified for 2021 Copa Libertadores |
| Brazil (6 berths) | Atlético Goianiense (Brazil 5) | Group stage | 2020 Campeonato Brasileiro Série A 5th best team not qualified for 2021 Copa Libertadores |
| Brazil (6 berths) | Bahia (Brazil 6) | Group stage | 2020 Campeonato Brasileiro Série A 6th best team not qualified for 2021 Copa Libertadores |
| Chile (4 berths) | Palestino (Chile 1) | First stage | 2020 Primera División best team not qualified for 2021 Copa Libertadores |
| Chile (4 berths) | Deportes Antofagasta (Chile 2) | First stage | 2020 Primera División 2nd best team not qualified for 2021 Copa Libertadores |
| Chile (4 berths) | Cobresal (Chile 3) | First stage | 2020 Primera División 3rd best team not qualified for 2021 Copa Libertadores |
| Chile (4 berths) | Huachipato (Chile 4) | First stage | 2020 Primera División 4th best team not qualified for 2021 Copa Libertadores |
| Colombia (4 berths) | Deportes Tolima (Colombia 1) | First stage | 2020 Primera A aggregate table best team not qualified for 2021 Copa Libertadores |
| Colombia (4 berths) | La Equidad (Colombia 2) | First stage | 2020 Primera A aggregate table 2nd best team not qualified for 2021 Copa Libertadores |
| Colombia (4 berths) | Deportivo Pasto (Colombia 3) | First stage | 2020 Primera A aggregate table 3rd best team not qualified for 2021 Copa Libertadores |
| Colombia (4 berths) | Deportivo Cali (Colombia 4) | First stage | 2020 Primera A Copa Sudamericana play-off winners |
| Ecuador (4 berths) | Emelec (Ecuador 1) | First stage | 2020 Serie A aggregate table best team not qualified for 2021 Copa Libertadores |
| Ecuador (4 berths) | Guayaquil City (Ecuador 2) | First stage | 2020 Serie A aggregate table 2nd best team not qualified for 2021 Copa Libertadores |
| Ecuador (4 berths) | Macará (Ecuador 3) | First stage | 2020 Serie A aggregate table 3rd best team not qualified for 2021 Copa Libertadores |
| Ecuador (4 berths) | Aucas (Ecuador 4) | First stage | 2020 Serie A aggregate table 4th best team not qualified for 2021 Copa Libertadores |
| Paraguay (4 berths) | Nacional (Paraguay 1) | First stage | 2020 Primera División aggregate table best team not qualified for 2021 Copa Libertadores |
| Paraguay (4 berths) | Guaireña (Paraguay 2) | First stage | 2020 Primera División aggregate table 2nd best team not qualified for 2021 Copa Libertadores |
| Paraguay (4 berths) | 12 de Octubre (Paraguay 3) | First stage | 2020 Primera División aggregate table 3rd best team not qualified for 2021 Copa Libertadores |
| Paraguay (4 berths) | River Plate (Paraguay 4) | First stage | 2020 Primera División aggregate table 4th best team not qualified for 2021 Copa Libertadores |
| Peru (4 berths) | Carlos A. Mannucci (Peru 1) | First stage | 2020 Liga 1 aggregate table best team not qualified for 2021 Copa Libertadores |
| Peru (4 berths) | Sport Huancayo (Peru 2) | First stage | 2020 Liga 1 aggregate table 2nd best team not qualified for 2021 Copa Libertadores |
| Peru (4 berths) | UTC (Peru 3) | First stage | 2020 Liga 1 aggregate table 3rd best team not qualified for 2021 Copa Libertadores |
| Peru (4 berths) | Melgar (Peru 4) | First stage | 2020 Liga 1 aggregate table 4th best team not qualified for 2021 Copa Libertadores |
| Uruguay (4 berths) | Peñarol (Uruguay 1) | First stage | 2020 Primera División aggregate table best team not qualified for 2021 Copa Libertadores |
| Uruguay (4 berths) | Montevideo City Torque (Uruguay 2) | First stage | 2020 Primera División aggregate table 2nd best team not qualified for 2021 Copa Libertadores |
| Uruguay (4 berths) | Cerro Largo (Uruguay 3) | First stage | 2020 Primera División aggregate table 3rd best team not qualified for 2021 Copa Libertadores |
| Uruguay (4 berths) | Fénix (Uruguay 4) | First stage | 2020 Primera División aggregate table 4th best team not qualified for 2021 Copa Libertadores |
| Venezuela (4 berths) | Academia Puerto Cabello (Venezuela 1) | First stage | 2020 Primera División aggregate table best team not qualified for 2021 Copa Libertadores |
| Venezuela (4 berths) | Aragua (Venezuela 2) | First stage | 2020 Primera División aggregate table 2nd best team not qualified for 2021 Copa Libertadores |
| Venezuela (4 berths) | Metropolitanos (Venezuela 3) | First stage | 2020 Primera División aggregate table 3rd best team not qualified for 2021 Copa Libertadores |
| Venezuela (4 berths) | Mineros de Guayana (Venezuela 4) | First stage | 2020 Primera División aggregate table 4th best team not qualified for 2021 Copa Libertadores |

A further 12 teams eliminated from the 2021 Copa Libertadores were transferred to the Copa Sudamericana, entering the group stage (four teams) and the round of 16 (eight teams).

| Teams eliminated in third stage | Entry stage |
|---|---|
| (Paraguay) Libertad | Group stage |
| (Brazil) Grêmio | Group stage |
| (Bolivia) Bolívar | Group stage |
| (Argentina) San Lorenzo | Group stage |
| Third-placed teams in group stage | Entry stage |
| (Ecuador) Independiente del Valle | Round of 16 |
| (Venezuela) Deportivo Táchira | Round of 16 |
| (Brazil) Santos | Round of 16 |
| (Colombia) Junior | Round of 16 |
| (Peru) Sporting Cristal | Round of 16 |
| (Uruguay) Nacional | Round of 16 |
| (Ecuador) LDU Quito | Round of 16 |
| (Colombia) América de Cali | Round of 16 |

Notes

1. Argentina (ARG): On 28 April 2020, the Argentine Football Association announced the abandonment of the 2020 Copa de la Superliga and the culmination of the 2019–20 season due to the COVID-19 pandemic in Argentina. The six Argentina berths of the 2021 Copa Sudamericana were awarded to the six best teams of the 2019–20 Superliga Argentina and 2020 Copa de la Superliga aggregate table not qualified for the 2021 Copa Libertadores.
2. Bolivia (BOL): The 2020 Clausura tournament was not held due to the COVID-19 pandemic in Bolivia, therefore the four Bolivia berths of the 2021 Copa Sudamericana were reallocated to the four best teams of the 2020 Apertura not qualified for the 2021 Copa Libertadores.
3. Colombia (COL): On 25 July 2020, DIMAYOR decided that the Colombia 4 berth, which was originally allocated to the 2020 Primera A aggregate table 4th best team not qualified for the 2021 Copa Libertadores, would be awarded to the winners of a play-off tournament between said team and the 12 teams that failed to qualify for the 2020 Primera A knockout stage.
4. Ecuador (ECU): The 2020 Copa Ecuador was cancelled due to the COVID-19 pandemic in Ecuador, therefore the Ecuador 4 berth which was originally allocated to the winners of said competition passed over to the 2020 Serie A aggregate table 4th best team not qualified for the 2021 Copa Libertadores.
5. Paraguay (PAR): The 2020 Copa Paraguay was postponed to 2021 due to the COVID-19 pandemic in Paraguay, therefore the Paraguay 4 berth which was originally allocated to the winners of said competition passed over to the 2020 Primera División aggregate table 4th best team not qualified for the 2021 Copa Libertadores.
6. Peru (PER): The 2020 Copa Bicentenario was cancelled due to the COVID-19 pandemic in Peru, therefore the Peru 4 berth which was originally allocated to the winners of said competition passed over to the 2020 Liga 1 aggregate table 4th best team not qualified for the 2021 Copa Libertadores.
7. Venezuela (VEN): On 15 May 2020, the Venezuelan Football Federation decided the permanent suspension of the 2020 Venezuelan Primera División season and the voiding of the standings and results recorded due to the COVID-19 pandemic in Venezuela. The allocation of the four Venezuela berths of the 2021 Copa Sudamericana would be announced at a later time, with the FVF confirming a will to organize a new tournament in which sporting merit, club licensing requirements, and medical protocols were applied. The definitive berth allocations were confirmed by the FVF on 18 September 2020.

== Schedule ==
The schedule of the competition was as follows:

| Stage | Draw date | First leg | Second leg |
|---|---|---|---|
| First stage | 5 February 2021 | 16–18 March 2021; 6–7 April 2021 | 6–8 April 2021; 13–14 April 2021 |
| Group stage | 9 April 2021 | Matchday 1: 20–22 April 2021; Matchday 2: 27–29 April 2021; Matchday 3: 4–6 May 2021; Matchday 4: 11–13 May 2021; Matchday 5: 18–20 May 2021; Matchday 6: 25–27 May 2021 | |
| Round of 16 | 1 June 2021 | 13–15 July 2021 | 20–22 July 2021 |
| Quarter-finals | 1 June 2021 | 10–12 August 2021 | 17–19 August 2021 |
| Semi-finals | 1 June 2021 | 22–23 September 2021 | 29–30 September 2021 |
| Final | 1 June 2021 | 20 November 2021 at Estadio Centenario, Montevideo | |

== Draws ==
Location of teams of the 2021 Copa Sudamericana.
Brown: Group A; Red: Group B; Orange: Group C;
Yellow: Group D; Green: Group E; Blue: Group F;
Purple: Group G; Pink: Group H; White: First stage;
Turquoise: Round of 16 entrants.
(L) Teams transferred from the 2021 Copa Libertadores.

The draw for the first stage was held on 5 February 2021, 12:00 PYST (UTC−3), at the CONMEBOL Convention Centre in Luque, Paraguay. For the first stage, the 32 teams involved were divided into eight pots according to their national association.

The 32 teams were drawn into 16 ties, with the four teams from each national association drawn against each other into two ties per association (e.g., the four teams from Bolivia were drawn into ties BOL 1 and BOL 2), and the first team drawn in each tie hosting the second leg. The draw for the group stage was held on 9 April 2021, 12:00 PYT (UTC−4), at the CONMEBOL Convention Centre in Luque, Paraguay.

Teams were seeded by their CONMEBOL Clubs ranking as of 1 February 2021 (shown in parentheses), taking into account the following three factors:

1. Performance in the last 10 years, taking into account Copa Libertadores and Copa Sudamericana results in the period 2011–2020.
2. Historical coefficient, taking into account Copa Libertadores and Copa Sudamericana results in the period 1960–2010 and 2002–2010 respectively.
3. Local tournament champion, with bonus points awarded to domestic league champions of the last 10 years.

For the group stage, the 32 teams were drawn into eight groups (Groups A–H) of four containing a team from each of the four pots. Teams from the same association could not be drawn into the same group, excluding the four losers of the Copa Libertadores third stage, which were seeded in Pot 4 and whose identity was not known at the time of the draw, and could be drawn into the same group with another team from the same association.

Group stage draw
| Pot 1 | Pot 2 | Pot 3 | Pot 4 |
|---|---|---|---|
| (Argentina) Independiente (10); (Argentina) Lanús (17); (Brazil) Corinthians (23); (Brazil) Athletico Paranaense (24); (Ecuador) Emelec (25); (Bolivia) Jorge Wilstermann (38); (Argentina) Rosario Central (43); (Argentina) Newell's Old Boys (56) | (Chile) Palestino (62); (Colombia) Deportes Tolima (63); (Argentina) Arsenal (65); (Brazil) Bahia (67); (Peru) Melgar (71); (Colombia) La Equidad (99); (Chile) Huachipato (116); (Peru) Sport Huancayo (122) | (Bolivia) Guabirá (172); (Argentina) Talleres (178); (Paraguay) 12 de Octubre (180); (Ecuador) Aucas (195); (Brazil) Atlético Goianiense (199); (Venezuela) Aragua (217); (Paraguay) River Plate (217); (Brazil) Ceará (262) | (Brazil) Red Bull Bragantino (no rank); (Venezuela) Metropolitanos (no rank); (Uruguay) Montevideo City Torque (no rank); (Uruguay) Peñarol (8); Copa Libertadores Third stage loser G1; Copa Libertadores Third stage loser G2; Copa Libertadores Third stage loser G3; Copa Libertadores Third stage loser G4 |

Notes

1. ^{URU} The identity of the two first stage winners from Uruguay was not known at the time of the draw, and they were seeded in Pot 4.

The draw for the round of 16 was held on 1 June 2021, 12:00 PYT (UTC−4), at the CONMEBOL Convention Centre in Luque, Paraguay. For the round of 16, the 16 teams were drawn into eight ties (A–H) between a Copa Sudamericana group winner (Pot 1) and a Copa Libertadores group third-placed (Pot 2), with the Copa Sudamericana group winners hosting the second leg. Teams from the same association or the same group could be drawn into the same tie (Regulations Article 2.2.3.2).

== First stage ==
In the first stage, each tie was played on a home-and-away two-legged basis. If tied on aggregate, the away goals rule was used. If still tied, extra time will not be played, and a penalty shoot-out would be used to determine the winner (Regulations Article 2.4.2).

The 16 winners of the first stage advanced to the group stage to join the 12 teams directly qualified for that stage (six from Argentina and six from Brazil), and four teams transferred from the Copa Libertadores (the four teams eliminated in the third stage of qualifying).

| Team 1 | Agg. | Team 2 | 1st leg | 2nd leg |
|---|---|---|---|---|
| Guabirá (Bolivia) | 6–2 | (Bolivia) Nacional Potosí | 4–1 | 2–1 |
| Jorge Wilstermann (Bolivia) | 4–2 | (Bolivia) Atlético Palmaflor | 2–1 | 2–1 |
| Deportes Antofagasta (Chile) | 0–4 | (Chile) Huachipato | 0–1 | 0–3 |
| Cobresal (Chile) | 1–2 | (Chile) Palestino | 0–0 | 1–2 |
| Deportes Tolima (Colombia) | 3–0 | (Colombia) Deportivo Cali | 3–0 | 0–0 |
| La Equidad (Colombia) | 3–2 | (Colombia) Deportivo Pasto | 1–2 | 2–0 |
| Macará (Ecuador) | 2–4 | (Ecuador) Emelec | 2–2 | 0–2 |
| Aucas (Ecuador) | 5–1 | (Ecuador) Guayaquil City | 2–1 | 3–0 |
| 12 de Octubre (Paraguay) | 0–0 (5–4 p) | (Paraguay) Nacional | 0–0 | 0–0 |
| Guaireña (Paraguay) | 3–6 | (Paraguay) River Plate | 1–2 | 2–4 |
| UTC (Peru) | 0–5 | (Peru) Sport Huancayo | 0–1 | 0–4 |
| Carlos A. Mannucci (Peru) | 3–5 | (Peru) Melgar | 1–2 | 2–3 |
| Montevideo City Torque (Uruguay) | 2–0 | (Uruguay) Fénix | 0–0 | 2–0 |
| Cerro Largo (Uruguay) | 3–6 | (Uruguay) Peñarol | 2–2 | 1–4 |
| Metropolitanos (Venezuela) | 3–0 | (Venezuela) Academia Puerto Cabello | 2–0 | 1–0 |
| Aragua (Venezuela) | 2–2 (a) | (Venezuela) Mineros de Guayana | 0–1 | 2–1 |

== Group stage ==
In the group stage, each group was played on a home-and-away round-robin basis. The teams were ranked according to the following criteria: 1. Points (3 points for a win, 1 point for a draw, and 0 points for a loss); 2. Goal difference; 3. Goals scored; 4. Away goals scored; 5. CONMEBOL ranking (Regulations Article 2.4.3).

The winners of each group advanced to the round of 16 of the final stages.

=== Group A ===
| Pos | Team | Pld | W | D | L | GF | GA | GD | Pts | Qualification | ROS | HUA | SLO | 12O |
|---|---|---|---|---|---|---|---|---|---|---|---|---|---|---|
| 1 | (Argentina) Rosario Central | 6 | 3 | 2 | 1 | 10 | 3 | +7 | 11 | Round of 16 | — | 5–0 | 2–0 | 0–0 |
| 2 | (Chile) Huachipato | 6 | 2 | 2 | 2 | 4 | 10 | −6 | 8 | | 1–1 | — | 0–3 | 0–0 |
| 3 | (Argentina) San Lorenzo | 6 | 2 | 1 | 3 | 7 | 6 | +1 | 7 | | 1–2 | 0–1 | — | 1–1 |
| 4 | (Paraguay) 12 de Octubre | 6 | 1 | 3 | 2 | 3 | 5 | −2 | 6 | | 1–0 | 1–2 | 0–2 | — |

Source: CONMEBOL

=== Group B ===
| Pos | Team | Pld | W | D | L | GF | GA | GD | Pts | Qualification | IND | MCT | BAH | GUA |
|---|---|---|---|---|---|---|---|---|---|---|---|---|---|---|
| 1 | (Argentina) Independiente | 6 | 4 | 2 | 0 | 11 | 5 | +6 | 14 | Round of 16 | — | 3–1 | 1–0 | 1–0 |
| 2 | (Uruguay) Montevideo City Torque | 6 | 3 | 2 | 1 | 15 | 7 | +8 | 11 | | 1–1 | — | 1–1 | 4–0 |
| 3 | (Brazil) Bahia | 6 | 2 | 2 | 2 | 11 | 8 | +3 | 8 | | 2–2 | 2–4 | — | 5–0 |
| 4 | (Bolivia) Guabirá | 6 | 0 | 0 | 6 | 1 | 18 | −17 | 0 | | 1–3 | 0–4 | 0–1 | — |

Source: CONMEBOL

=== Group C ===
| Pos | Team | Pld | W | D | L | GF | GA | GD | Pts | Qualification | ARS | CEA | BOL | WIL |
|---|---|---|---|---|---|---|---|---|---|---|---|---|---|---|
| 1 | (Argentina) Arsenal | 6 | 3 | 2 | 1 | 9 | 4 | +5 | 11 | Round of 16 | — | 0–0 | 3–1 | 3–0 |
| 2 | (Brazil) Ceará | 6 | 2 | 3 | 1 | 5 | 2 | +3 | 9 | | 0–0 | — | 2–0 | 3–1 |
| 3 | (Bolivia) Bolívar | 6 | 1 | 3 | 2 | 5 | 8 | −3 | 6 | | 2–1 | 0–0 | — | 2–2 |
| 4 | (Bolivia) Jorge Wilstermann | 6 | 1 | 2 | 3 | 5 | 10 | −5 | 5 | | 1–2 | 1–0 | 0–0 | — |

Source: CONMEBOL

=== Group D ===
| Pos | Team | Pld | W | D | L | GF | GA | GD | Pts | Qualification | CAP | MEL | AUC | MET |
|---|---|---|---|---|---|---|---|---|---|---|---|---|---|---|
| 1 | (Brazil) Athletico Paranaense | 6 | 5 | 0 | 1 | 8 | 1 | +7 | 15 | Round of 16 | — | 1–0 | 4–0 | 1–0 |
| 2 | (Peru) Melgar | 6 | 3 | 1 | 2 | 7 | 5 | +2 | 10 | | 1–0 | — | 2–0 | 0–0 |
| 3 | (Ecuador) Aucas | 6 | 2 | 0 | 4 | 7 | 11 | −4 | 6 | | 0–1 | 2–1 | — | 3–0 |
| 4 | (Venezuela) Metropolitanos | 6 | 1 | 1 | 4 | 5 | 10 | −5 | 4 | | 0–1 | 2–3 | 3–2 | — |

Source: CONMEBOL

=== Group E ===
| Pos | Team | Pld | W | D | L | GF | GA | GD | Pts | Qualification | PEÑ | COR | RIV | SHU |
|---|---|---|---|---|---|---|---|---|---|---|---|---|---|---|
| 1 | (Uruguay) Peñarol | 6 | 4 | 1 | 1 | 15 | 3 | +12 | 13 | Round of 16 | — | 4–0 | 3–0 | 5–1 |
| 2 | (Brazil) Corinthians | 6 | 3 | 1 | 2 | 12 | 6 | +6 | 10 | | 0–2 | — | 4–0 | 5–0 |
| 3 | (Paraguay) River Plate | 6 | 3 | 1 | 2 | 6 | 10 | −4 | 10 | | 2–1 | 0–0 | — | 2–1 |
| 4 | (Peru) Sport Huancayo | 6 | 0 | 1 | 5 | 3 | 17 | −14 | 1 | | 0–0 | 0–3 | 1–2 | — |

Source: CONMEBOL

=== Group F ===
| Pos | Team | Pld | W | D | L | GF | GA | GD | Pts | Qualification | LIB | ACG | NOB | PAL |
|---|---|---|---|---|---|---|---|---|---|---|---|---|---|---|
| 1 | (Paraguay) Libertad | 6 | 4 | 1 | 1 | 9 | 4 | +5 | 13 | Round of 16 | — | 1–2 | 1–0 | 2–0 |
| 2 | (Brazil) Atlético Goianiense | 6 | 2 | 4 | 0 | 4 | 2 | +2 | 10 | | 0–0 | — | 0–0 | 0–0 |
| 3 | (Argentina) Newell's Old Boys | 6 | 2 | 2 | 2 | 6 | 6 | 0 | 8 | | 1–3 | 1–1 | — | 3–1 |
| 4 | (Chile) Palestino | 6 | 0 | 1 | 5 | 2 | 9 | −7 | 1 | | 1–2 | 0–1 | 0–1 | — |

Source: CONMEBOL

=== Group G ===
| Pos | Team | Pld | W | D | L | GF | GA | GD | Pts | Qualification | RBB | EME | TAL | TOL |
|---|---|---|---|---|---|---|---|---|---|---|---|---|---|---|
| 1 | (Brazil) Red Bull Bragantino | 6 | 4 | 0 | 2 | 7 | 6 | +1 | 12 | Round of 16 | — | 2–0 | 0–1 | 2–1 |
| 2 | (Ecuador) Emelec | 6 | 3 | 1 | 2 | 9 | 8 | +1 | 10 | | 3–0 | — | 1–4 | 2–0 |
| 3 | (Argentina) Talleres | 6 | 2 | 2 | 2 | 7 | 5 | +2 | 8 | | 0–1 | 1–2 | — | 0–0 |
| 4 | (Colombia) Deportes Tolima | 6 | 0 | 3 | 3 | 4 | 8 | −4 | 3 | | 1–2 | 1–1 | 1–1 | — |

Source: CONMEBOL

=== Group H ===
| Pos | Team | Pld | W | D | L | GF | GA | GD | Pts | Qualification | GRE | LAN | EQU | ARA |
|---|---|---|---|---|---|---|---|---|---|---|---|---|---|---|
| 1 | (Brazil) Grêmio | 6 | 5 | 1 | 0 | 21 | 5 | +16 | 16 | Round of 16 | — | 3–1 | 2–1 | 8–0 |
| 2 | (Argentina) Lanús | 6 | 3 | 1 | 2 | 8 | 6 | +2 | 10 | | 1–2 | — | 4–1 | 0–0 |
| 3 | (Colombia) La Equidad | 6 | 2 | 1 | 3 | 6 | 9 | −3 | 7 | | 0–0 | 0–1 | — | 2–1 |
| 4 | (Venezuela) Aragua | 6 | 0 | 1 | 5 | 4 | 19 | −15 | 1 | | 2–6 | 0–1 | 1–2 | — |

Source: CONMEBOL

== Final stages ==
Starting from the round of 16, the teams played a single-elimination tournament with the following rules:

- In the round of 16, quarter-finals and semi-finals, each tie was played on a home-and-away two-legged basis, with the higher-seeded team hosting the second leg (Regulations Article 2.2.3). If tied on aggregate, the away goals rule was used. If still tied, extra time was not played, and a penalty shoot-out was used to determine the winners (Regulations Article 2.4.4).
- The final was played as a single match at a venue pre-selected by CONMEBOL, with the higher-seeded team designated as the "home" team for administrative purposes (Regulations Article 2.2.6). If tied after regulation, 30 minutes of extra time was played. If still tied after extra time, a penalty shoot-out was used to determine the winners (Regulations Article 2.4.5).

=== Seeding ===
Starting from the round of 16, the teams are seeded according to their results in the group stage, with the Copa Sudamericana group winners (Pot 1) seeded 1–8, and the Copa Libertadores group third-placed teams (Pot 2) seeded 9–16.

| Seed | Grp | Team | Pld | W | D | L | GF | GA | GD | Pts | Round of 16 draw |
|---|---|---|---|---|---|---|---|---|---|---|---|
| 1 | SH | (Brazil) Grêmio | 6 | 5 | 1 | 0 | 21 | 5 | +16 | 16 | Pot 1 |
| 2 | SD | (Brazil) Athletico Paranaense | 6 | 5 | 0 | 1 | 8 | 1 | +7 | 15 | Pot 1 |
| 3 | SB | (Argentina) Independiente | 6 | 4 | 2 | 0 | 11 | 5 | +6 | 14 | Pot 1 |
| 4 | SE | (Uruguay) Peñarol | 6 | 4 | 1 | 1 | 15 | 3 | +12 | 13 | Pot 1 |
| 5 | SF | (Paraguay) Libertad | 6 | 4 | 1 | 1 | 9 | 4 | +5 | 13 | Pot 1 |
| 6 | SG | (Brazil) Red Bull Bragantino | 6 | 4 | 0 | 2 | 7 | 6 | +1 | 12 | Pot 1 |
| 7 | SA | (Argentina) Rosario Central | 6 | 3 | 2 | 1 | 10 | 3 | +7 | 11 | Pot 1 |
| 8 | SC | (Argentina) Arsenal | 6 | 3 | 2 | 1 | 9 | 4 | +5 | 11 | Pot 1 |
| 9 | LB | (Venezuela) Deportivo Táchira | 6 | 3 | 0 | 3 | 14 | 17 | −3 | 9 | Pot 2 |
| 10 | LG | (Ecuador) LDU Quito | 6 | 2 | 2 | 2 | 15 | 13 | +2 | 8 | Pot 2 |
| 11 | LF | (Uruguay) Nacional | 6 | 2 | 2 | 2 | 8 | 9 | −1 | 8 | Pot 2 |
| 12 | LD | (Colombia) Junior | 6 | 1 | 4 | 1 | 6 | 6 | 0 | 7 | Pot 2 |
| 13 | LC | (Brazil) Santos | 6 | 2 | 0 | 4 | 8 | 9 | −1 | 6 | Pot 2 |
| 14 | LA | (Ecuador) Independiente del Valle | 6 | 1 | 2 | 3 | 8 | 11 | −3 | 5 | Pot 2 |
| 15 | LH | (Colombia) América de Cali | 6 | 1 | 1 | 4 | 5 | 9 | −4 | 4 | Pot 2 |
| 16 | LE | (Peru) Sporting Cristal | 6 | 1 | 1 | 4 | 3 | 10 | −7 | 4 | Pot 2 |

Source: CONMEBOL
Rules for classification: 1) Higher position in group; 2) Points; 3) Goal difference; 4) Goals scored; 5) Away goals scored; 6) CONMEBOL ranking (Regulations Article 2.4.3).

=== Bracket ===
The bracket was decided based on the round of 16 draw, which was held on 1 June 2021.

Round of 16
16 | (Peru) Sporting Cristal | 2 | 1 | 3
8 | (Argentina) Arsenal | 1 | 1 | 2
11 | (Uruguay) Nacional | 1 | 1 | 2
4 | (Uruguay) Peñarol (a) | 2 | 0 | 2
10 | (Ecuador) LDU Quito (a) | 0 | 2 | 2
1 | (Brazil) Grêmio | 1 | 1 | 2
15 | (Colombia) América de Cali | 0 | 1 | 1
2 | (Brazil) Athletico Paranaense | 1 | 4 | 5
9 | (Venezuela) Deportivo Táchira | 2 | 0 | 2
7 | (Argentina) Rosario Central | 2 | 1 | 3
14 | (Ecuador) Independiente del Valle | 0 | 1 | 1
6 | (Brazil) Red Bull Bragantino | 2 | 1 | 3
13 | (Brazil) Santos | 1 | 1 | 2
3 | (Argentina) Independiente | 0 | 1 | 1
12 | (Colombia) Junior | 3 | 1 | 4
5 | (Paraguay) Libertad (a) | 4 | 0 | 4

Quarter-finals
16 | (Peru) Sporting Cristal | 1 | 0 | 1
4 | (Uruguay) Peñarol | 3 | 1 | 4
10 | (Ecuador) LDU Quito | 1 | 2 | 3
2 | (Brazil) Athletico Paranaense | 0 | 4 | 4
7 | (Argentina) Rosario Central | 3 | 0 | 3
6 | (Brazil) Red Bull Bragantino | 4 | 1 | 5
13 | (Brazil) Santos | 2 | 0 | 2
5 | (Paraguay) Libertad (a) | 1 | 1 | 2

Semi-finals
4 | (Uruguay) Peñarol | 1 | 0 | 1
2 | (Brazil) Athletico Paranaense | 2 | 2 | 4
6 | (Brazil) Red Bull Bragantino | 2 | 3 | 5
5 | (Paraguay) Libertad | 0 | 1 | 1

Final
20 November – Montevideo
2 | (Brazil) Athletico Paranaense | 1
6 | (Brazil) Red Bull Bragantino | 0

=== Round of 16 ===
| Team 1 | Agg. | Team 2 | 1st leg | 2nd leg |
|---|---|---|---|---|
| Nacional (Uruguay) | 2–2 (a) | (Uruguay) Peñarol | 1–2 | 1–0 |
| Independiente del Valle (Ecuador) | 1–3 | (Brazil) Red Bull Bragantino | 0–2 | 1–1 |
| Santos (Brazil) | 2–1 | (Argentina) Independiente | 1–0 | 1–1 |
| América de Cali (Colombia) | 1–5 | (Brazil) Athletico Paranaense | 0–1 | 1–4 |
| LDU Quito (Ecuador) | 2–2 (a) | (Brazil) Grêmio | 0–1 | 2–1 |
| Junior (Colombia) | 4–4 (a) | (Paraguay) Libertad | 3–4 | 1–0 |
| Deportivo Táchira (Venezuela) | 2–3 | (Argentina) Rosario Central | 2–2 | 0–1 |
| Sporting Cristal (Peru) | 3–2 | (Argentina) Arsenal | 2–1 | 1–1 |

=== Quarter-finals ===
| Team 1 | Agg. | Team 2 | 1st leg | 2nd leg |
|---|---|---|---|---|
| Sporting Cristal (Peru) | 1–4 | (Uruguay) Peñarol | 1–3 | 0–1 |
| Rosario Central (Argentina) | 3–5 | (Brazil) Red Bull Bragantino | 3–4 | 0–1 |
| Santos (Brazil) | 2–2 (a) | (Paraguay) Libertad | 2–1 | 0–1 |
| LDU Quito (Ecuador) | 3–4 | (Brazil) Athletico Paranaense | 1–0 | 2–4 |

=== Semi-finals ===
| Team 1 | Agg. | Team 2 | 1st leg | 2nd leg |
|---|---|---|---|---|
| Peñarol (Uruguay) | 1–4 | (Brazil) Athletico Paranaense | 1–2 | 0–2 |
| Red Bull Bragantino (Brazil) | 5–1 | (Paraguay) Libertad | 2–0 | 3–1 |

=== Final ===
20 November 2021
17:00 UTC−3

| Athletico Paranaense (Brazil) | 1–0 | (Brazil) Red Bull Bragantino |
|---|---|---|
| Nikão 29' | Report |

Estadio Centenario, Montevideo
Attendance: 20,000
Referee: Andrés Matonte (Uruguay)

== Statistics ==
=== Top scorers ===
| Rank | Player | Team | 1S1 | 1S2 | GS1 | GS2 | GS3 | GS4 | GS5 | GS6 | ⅛F1 | ⅛F2 | QF1 | QF2 | SF1 | SF2 | F | Total |
|---|---|---|---|---|---|---|---|---|---|---|---|---|---|---|---|---|---|---|
| 1 | (Uruguay) Agustín Álvarez Martínez | (Uruguay) Peñarol | | 2 | 2 | | | 3 | 1 | | | | 1 | | 1 | | | 10 |
| 2 | (Brazil) Artur | (Brazil) Red Bull Bragantino | | | | | | 1 | | | | | 3 | 1 | 1 | 1 | | 7 |
| 3 | (Argentina) Gustavo Del Prete | (Uruguay) Montevideo City Torque | | 1 | | 1 | 2 | 1 | 1 | | | | | | | | | 6 |
| 3 | (Argentina) Jonathan Herrera | (Argentina) Independiente | | | 3 | 1 | 1 | 1 | | | | | | | | | | 6 |
| 5 | (Argentina) Lucas Albertengo | (Argentina) Arsenal | | | | | 1 | | 1 | 2 | | 1 | | | | | | 5 |
| 5 | (Argentina) Bernardo Cuesta | (Peru) Melgar | | 1 | 1 | 2 | | 1 | | | | | | | | | | 5 |
| 5 | (Brazil) Ferreira | (Brazil) Grêmio | | | | 1 | 2 | 2 | | | | | | | | | | 5 |
| 5 | (Colombia) Humberto Osorio | (Bolivia) Jorge Wilstermann | 1 | 1 | 1 | | | 1 | 1 | | | | | | | | | 5 |
| 9 | (Paraguay) Marcelo González | (Paraguay) River Plate | | 1 | | 2 | | 1 | | | | | | | | | | 4 |
| 9 | (Brazil) Nikão | (Brazil) Athletico Paranaense | | | | | | | | | 1 | 1 | | | | 1 | 1 | 4 |
| 9 | (Uruguay) David Terans | (Uruguay) Peñarol (Brazil) Athletico Paranaense | 1 | | 1 | 1 | | | | | | | | | 1 | | | 4 |
| 9 | (Uruguay) Facundo Torres | (Uruguay) Peñarol | | 1 | 1 | | 1 | | | | | | 1 | | | | | 4 |
| 9 | (Brazil) Vitinho | (Brazil) Athletico Paranaense | | | | | | 1 | | 1 | | 2 | | | | | | 4 |

Source: CONMEBOL.com

== See also ==
- 2021 Copa Libertadores
