= Los Grutynos =

Argentine comic strip

Los Grutynos is an Argentine comic strip about a fictional family which come from the bottom of the sea of the City of Grutópolys, located in the Bahía sin Fondo (Bottomless Bay), San Matías Gulf, in Patagonia Argentina, created by Beto Noy, a business man born in the Río Negro province.

They are creatures with special powers, and long-lived (by each human century they age only a year). They have the mission to take care of and to protect the nature, to help the human beings and to guard by the Sacred Chalice, the Holy Grail. They are sweet, they live with joy and they help the others. At the present time the Grutynos inhabit in some place of Las Grutas, in the San Antonio department, of the Río Negro province, in the north of Patagonia. They relate with human characters like Graiel, Santino, Salvador and others of the real life like the basketball player Manu Ginóbili.

Up to now, nobody knows about their participation, throughout history, in the events that happened in this region, such as the arrival of the famous Templars.

Their adventures, in form of comic strip, are daily published from 2006 in the Noticias de la Costa (News of the Coast) newspaper, of Viedma, Río Negro province. The comic writer is José Massaroli, who based his work on the ideas of Beto Noy. The comic artist is Ramón Ángel Gil, who has also created the visual aspect of the characters, and the inker is Raúl Barbero.

In addition, usually the Grutynos appear in fairs of tourism and festivals for children.

== Characters ==
=== Grucyque ===
Wise Grandfather. Lord of the Bahía sin Fondo, King of Grutópolys. Higher conscience. Powerful (it has the power of one of the four elements, the water) Capacity to read the soul. Gift of telepathic communication across the Universe. He is deeply respected and admired by all the Gods of the Universe. Great nobility. Patriarch. Pacific, its weapon is Peace. It has the wisdom gathered during his lived centuries. He has a great love by the moon, place where his beloved wife rests. From this union, his only son Gruto was born. His mission is to expand harmony and union between all the beings that inhabit the planet. This being, like all those of his family, is longeval. For each human century they only grow one year old. Physical appearance: Amphibian. Of great stature. Thin. Healthful.

=== Gruto ===
Son of Grucyque: prince of Grutópolys. Poet, with his verses he won the heart of Grutyna. Invincible force. Courage, soldier. Nobleman like his father. Simple. At some moments, rather melancholic, specially when there is Full Moon (he tries to communicate with his beloved mother). Of pure heart, and transparent look. He loves children. He has the power of one of the four elements, the Earth. He is loved and protected by all the Gods of the Universe. His mission is to safeguard Man of itself, to protectNature, and to guard the Sacred Chalice, the Holy Grail, and other secrets. Physical appearance: Almost two meters. Elegant, with great force and health.

=== Grutyna ===
Grutyna is beautiful, sensual and sensitive. It has friends of all times, due to the special power of his privileged song, that includes poems written by his beloved Gruto. Her VOICE dominates all the sea She is sweet, magical, heavenly, it captives the sirens who wish to imitate it. Her beauty is unique and incomparable and it fascinateschildren and adults. Besides she is an exemplary mother.

=== Pulpyno ===
Restless, jocose, very curious, he adores music, and has a collection of strange musical instruments invented by himself, which he jealously guards on a secret island. He is sweet-toothed, and he loves alfajores. With his frog feet, he can also dance the tango, and above all he plays soccer exceptionally well. Friendship is for him a sacred bond. That is why his friends adore it. Among the four elements, he has the power in the wind, from which he deciphers melodies to play with his instruments, which he plays at sunrise, and specially at full moon.

=== Pulpyta ===
She was born in the blessed waters of Las Grutas, in the mid-13th century. Among the four elements, her power is FIRE, which she dominates to protect her race and to warm the famous waters of the Gulf of San Matías. Her sincerity and intelligence are unlimited. In frozen winters, she transmits warmness to all homes. She is specially protected by the Solar God protects her specially. When she was born the Solar God handed her the keys of the Rainbow colours which hide an invaluable treasure: by means of these, the Solar God communicates with her. She loves dancing because when she dances the sun laughs and the waves clap her. She only eats dulce de leche (milk candy); she herself is the whole sweetness.

=== Yno, the Sea Elf ===
Loved by the forces of the Good, and very feared for the dark forces of Evil. Admired and respected by all the elfs, and by all the kingdoms of space, the Earth and the cosmos. The Guardian of Grutopolys; his power is ancient and eternal. During Peace he is invisible, but during war he is invincible. He adapts to any situation to fulfill his mission. He was present at the birth of his friend, the Great King Grucyque. He is permanently fighting against Evil, and his weapons are the four elements that Grucyque gave him . He loves and protects everybody, specially the children. Pears and apples are his favorite food. He guards the warm and blessed waters of Las Grutas.
