= Sebastián Beccacece =

Argentine football manager (born 1980)

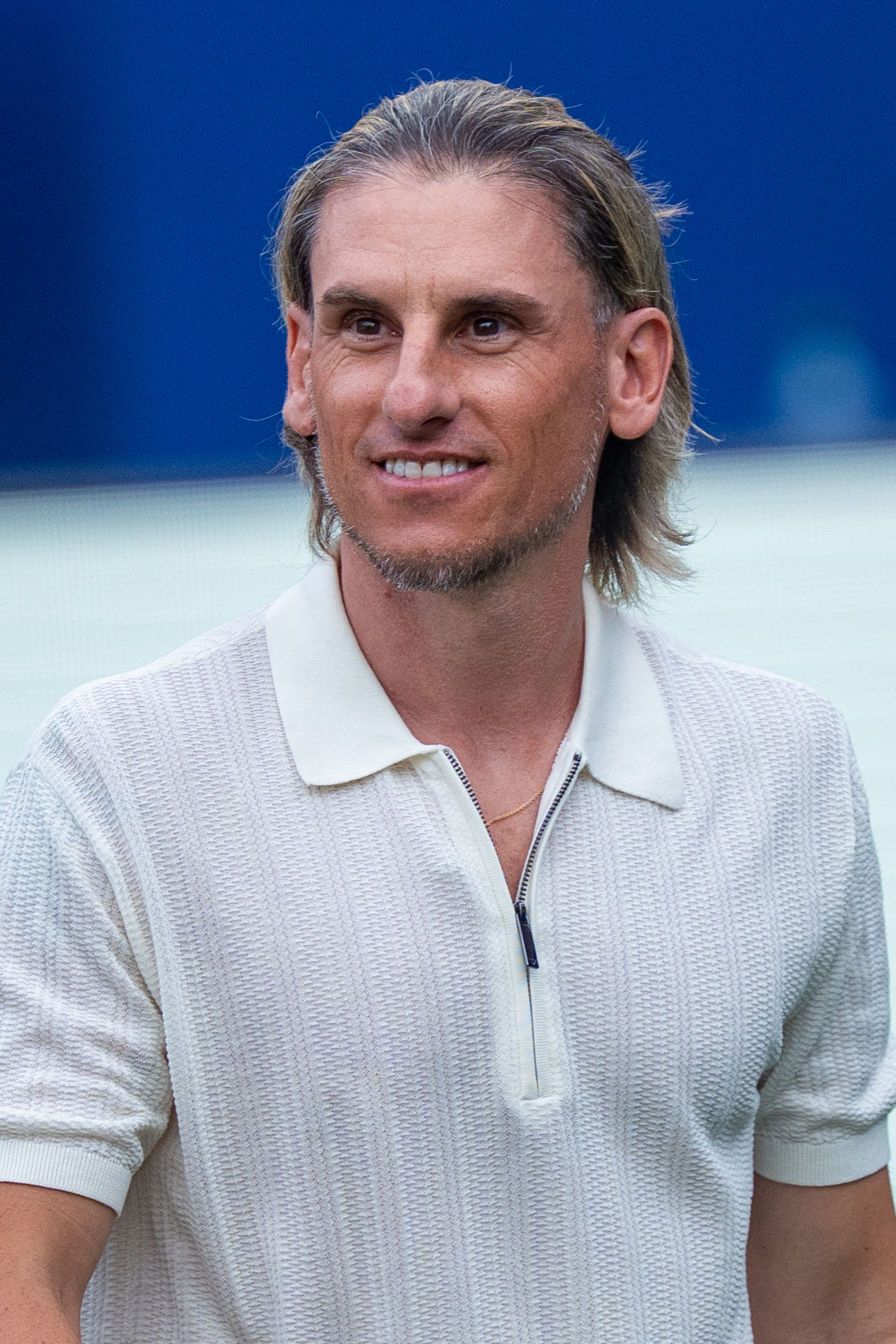
- Beccacece with Ecuador at the 2026 FIFA World Cup

Personal information
- Full name: Sebastián Andrés Beccacece
- Date of birth: 17 December 1980 (age 45)
- Place of birth: Rosario, Santa Fe, Argentina
- Height: 1.79 m (5 ft 10 in)
- Position: Right-back

Youth career
- Years: Team
- Lavalle
- 1995–2001: Juan XXIII

Managerial career
- 2016: Universidad de Chile
- 2016–2017: Defensa y Justicia
- 2017–2018: Argentina U20
- 2018–2019: Defensa y Justicia
- 2019: Independiente
- 2020–2021: Racing Club
- 2021–2022: Defensa y Justicia
- 2023–2024: Elche
- 2024–2026: Ecuador

Sebastián Andrés Beccacece (born 17 December 1980) is an Argentine professional football manager. He last served as the head coach of the Ecuador national team.

== Early life ==
Sebastián Andrés Beccacece was born in Rosario, Beccacece lived in the La República neighborhood with his parents Julio and Mónica, and his two brothers. His twin brother Aníbal played football for their hometown side Central Córdoba.

== Career ==
=== Early career ===
Beccacece played for Argentine amateur clubs Lavalle and Juan XXIII as a right back when he was a teenager, but after realising he would not become a top-tier footballer, he stopped playing. He then started working at Newell's Old Boys' youth setup, initially managing kids between the age of four and 12. He also worked at Club Renato Cesarini's youth setup, managing the 1989/1990 age groups.

=== Working with Sampaoli ===
After meeting Jorge Sampaoli in his hometown in 2002, Beccacece was named his assistant coach at Peruvian side Sport Boys in 2003. He remained his assistant at Coronel Bolognesi (2004–2005 and 2006), Sporting Cristal (2007), O'Higgins (2008–2009) and Emelec (2010).

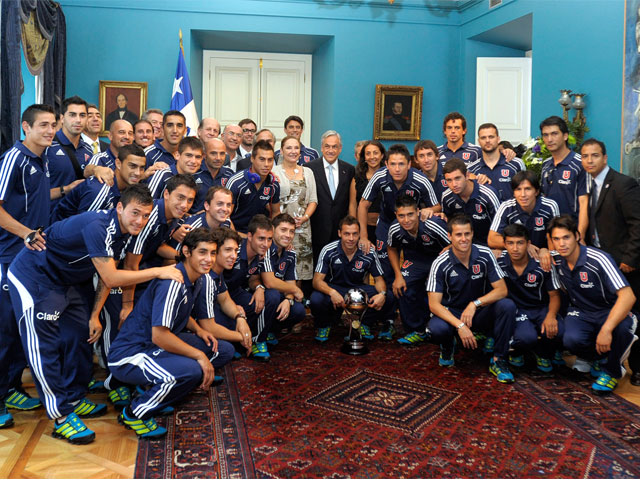
Beccacece (first row, fifth from left) with Universidad de Chile's 2011 Copa Sudamericana champion team at Moneda Palace with the then president Sebastián Piñera.

In 2010, following the 2010 FIFA World Cup, Beccacece reportedly rejected an invitation of Marcelo Bielsa to work as his assistant in the Chile national team, and continued to work with Sampaoli. The duo subsequently joined Universidad de Chile for the 2011 season, where they won the 2011 Apertura, the 2011 Clausura, the 2012 Apertura and the 2011 Copa Sudamericana.

Following their success at Universidad de Chile, in 2013, Beccacece and Sampaoli were signed by the ANFP to lead the Chile national team, finally arriving there after rejecting Bielsa's offer. At Chile they achieved the qualification to the 2014 FIFA World Cup and lifted the first ever Copa América title in the country's history. In 2015, they resigned from the Chile national team amidst the FIFA corruption case where they were involved alongside the federation's president Sergio Jadue.

=== Universidad de Chile ===
On 11 January 2016, Beccacece ended his spell as Sampaoli's assistant to take over Universidad de Chile, replacing Martín Lasarte. During his first days at the club, the team received as signings the Argentine playmaker Luis Fariña on 12 January, and a week later, the Chilean international Gonzalo Jara and also the Argentine Fabián Monzón from Catania.

On 24 January, in his second league game since his debut for this competition at the bench (a 1–1 away draw with Deportes Antofagasta), Beccacece impressed following the team's 8–1 home thrash over O'Higgins at the Estadio Nacional. After of that great victory nevertheless the team reaped three draws and one loss against Palestino (2–1). During February's first days, the team was eliminated of the Copa Libertadores first stage by Uruguay's River Plate, which was his first failure and it meant being the target of criticism from the press and the team's supporters. On 28 February, the 4–1 away victory over Cobresal would be a balm of the team's moment. Following a 0–0 draw with Unión Española and two losses (3–1 with Universidad de Concepción as local and 5–4 against Santiago Wanderers as visitors), he back to draw, now in the Chilean football derby with Colo-Colo, which was again a goalless where both teams were criticized for its game level. Finally, Beccacece would end in the tenth place with three wins, seven draws and five losses and his continuity was heavily questioned during the Copa América Centenario break.

For the purpose of the 2016 Torneo Apertura, the club hired to Luis María Bonini as fitness coach and were appointed ten players which joined the club, between the most important figured Jean Beausejour from archi-rivals Colo-Colo, Christian Vilches from Atlético Paranaense (former Colo-Colo too) and the Argentine playmaker Gastón Fernández from Estudiantes. He began the tournament losing 1–0 with Wanderers at Valparaíso, and drawing 1–1 as locals with Deportes Antofagasta on 7 August, date where again his continuity was questioned. Nevertheless, he would return to victory, reaching two consecutive triumphs with San Luis de Quillota (4–2) and Universidad de Concepción (3–1), that this time saw their end on 27 August after being defeated 3–0 by Universidad Católica. Highlighting, that game he kicked a freezer next to the bench during the moment that the referee Roberto Tobar took penalty which finally was Católica's third goal.

Beccacece left la U on 17 September 2016, after agreeing to cut short his contract with the club.

=== Defensa y Justicia ===
On 15 November 2016, Beccacece replaced Ariel Holan at the helm of Argentine Primera División side Defensa y Justicia. His first match in charge of the club occurred thirteen days later, a 1–2 loss against Patronato.

Beccacece was also in charge of Defensa during their 2017 Copa Sudamericana run, the club's first continental competition in their history, where they notably knocked out Brazilian side São Paulo at the Morumbi Stadium. His last match in charge occurred on 28 June, a 1–0 win against Chapecoense, as he left the club to join Sampaoli's staff again.

=== Argentina (assistant) ===
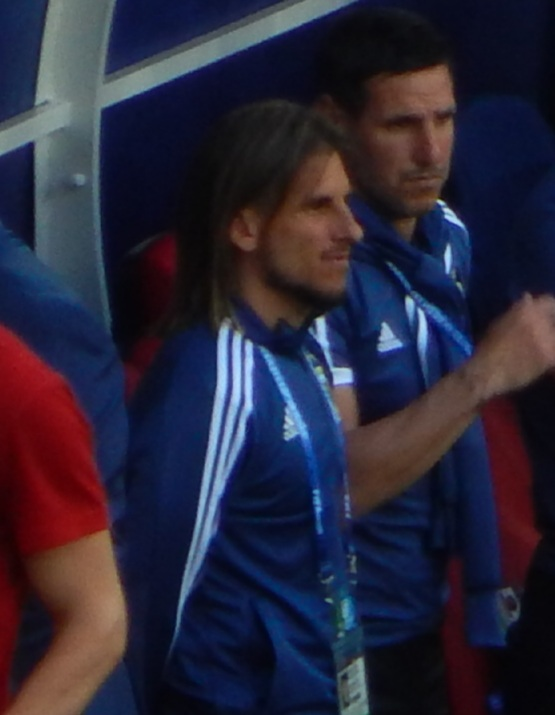
Beccacece with Argentina at the 2018 FIFA World Cup

After admitting contacts made by Sampaoli in April 2017, Beccacece accepted the role as his assistant manager at the Argentina football team in May, and joined the staff in June. Despite struggling in the qualifiers, they achieved the qualification to the 2018 FIFA World Cup in the last round.

After Argentina's elimination from the World Cup, Beccacece rescinded his contract with the Argentine Football Association on 6 July 2018.

=== Defensa y Justicia return ===
On 7 July 2018, Beccacece returned to Defensa y Justicia, again being named their manager. He achieved an impressive 2018–19 season with the club, finishing second and qualifying the team to the Copa Libertadores for the first time in their history.

=== Independiente ===
On 7 June 2019, Beccacece was presented as manager of fellow top-tier side Independiente. He left the club on 26 October, by mutual agreement.

=== Racing Club ===
On 16 December 2019, Beccacece signed an 18-month contract with Racing Club, still in the Argentine top tier. He led the club to a fourth position in the league before its abandonment due to the COVID-19 pandemic, and reached the quarterfinals of the 2020 Copa Libertadores before being knocked out by Boca Juniors.

On 26 December 2020, Beccacece resigned.

=== Defensa y Justicia (3rd spell) ===
On 15 February 2021, Beccacece returned to Defensa for a third spell. He resigned on 11 September of the following year.

=== Elche ===
On 21 March 2023, Beccacece took charge of La Liga side Elche, becoming their fourth manager of the season. Despite suffering relegation, he remained in charge of the club in the following campaign, before announcing his departure on 26 May 2024, after the club's chances to qualify for the play-offs were extinguished.

=== Ecuador ===
On 1 August 2024, he was announced as head coach of the Ecuador national team.

At the 2026 FIFA World Cup, Ecuador achieved a 2–1 victory over Germany in their third group-stage match, qualifying as one of the eight best third-place teams. However, Ecuador were defeated 2–0 by hosts Mexico in the Round of 32 and eliminated from the competition, leading to Beccacece stepping down as manager.

== Managerial statistics ==
As of 1 July 2026

Managerial record by team and tenure
Team	Nat.	From	To	Record								Ref.
Team	Nat.	From	To	G	W	D	L	GF	GA	GD	Win %	Ref.
Universidad de Chile	(Chile)	11 January 2016	17 September 2016	25	5	10	10	39	40	−1	20.00	
Defensa y Justicia	(Argentina)	15 November 2016	28 June 2017	24	15	4	5	30	13	+17	62.50	
Defensa y Justicia	(Argentina)	7 July 2018	7 June 2019	37	19	10	8	41	29	+12	51.35	
Independiente	(Argentina)	7 June 2019	26 October 2019	16	8	1	7	16	18	−2	50.00	
Racing Club	(Argentina)	16 December 2019	26 December 2020	29	13	8	8	39	34	+5	44.83	
Defensa y Justicia	(Argentina)	15 February 2021	11 September 2022	92	34	27	31	126	115	+11	36.96	
Elche	(Spain)	21 March 2023	2 June 2024	57	21	14	22	59	65	−6	36.84	
Ecuador	(Ecuador)	1 August 2024	1 July 2026	24	9	12	3	22	11	+11	37.50	
Career Total				304	124	86	94	372	325	+47	40.79	

== Honours ==
Defensa y Justicia

- Recopa Sudamericana: 2021
