= Mateo Coronel =

Argentine footballer

Personal information
- Full name: Mateo Agustín Coronel
- Date of birth: 24 October 1998 (age 28)
- Place of birth: Ramallo, Argentina
- Height: 1.72 m (5 ft 8 in)
- Position: Attacking midfielder

Team information
- Current team: Querétaro (on loan from Atlético Tucumán)
- Number: 11

Youth career
- Social Ramallo
- 2014–2016: Newell's Old Boys

Senior career*
Years	Team	Apps	(Gls)
2016–2019	Defensores de Belgrano	37	(3)
2019–2023	Argentinos Juniors	44	(6)
2022–2023	→ Atlético Tucumán (loan)	57	(15)
2023–	Atlético Tucumán	36	(6)
2025–	→ Querétaro (loan)	36	(9)
- * Club domestic league appearances and goals as of 05:31, 26 October 2026 (UTC)

Mateo Agustín Coronel (born 24 October 1998) is an Argentine professional footballer who plays as an attacking midfielder for Liga MX club Querétaro, on loan from Argentine Primera División club Atlético Tucumán.

== Career ==
Coronel spent the majority of his youth career with Social Ramallo, prior to moving to Newell's Old Boys' system at the age of sixteen. Coronel left the latter in 2016, subsequently joining Defensores de Belgrano; a squad he shared with his brother. He made his Torneo Federal A debut on 4 September 2016 against Rivadavia, but would leave the game early after receiving a red card in stoppage time; despite only coming on with fourteen minutes left. Coronel scored his first senior goal on 24 September 2017 away to Unión Sunchales, before netting a brace in an eventual 5–0 win a week later against Douglas Haig.

After forty total appearances for Defensores de Belgrano, Coronel departed to Primera División outfit Argentinos Juniors in July 2019; having not featured in the preceding seven months due to contractual disagreements between him and Defensores. Coronel didn't appear at first-team level for Argentinos in 2019–20, though was on the substitutes' bench once for a defeat to Vélez Sarsfield in March 2020. His debut for the club eventually arrived later that year on 31 October, with the forward playing for eighty-three minutes of a goalless draw with San Lorenzo in the Copa de la Liga Profesional. On 8 July 2022, Coronel joined fellow league club Atlético Tucumán on loan until December 2023, free of charge and with a purchase option.

== Personal life ==
Coronel has other footballers in his family. His brother, Franco, started his senior career with Defensores de Belgrano, while sister Emilia played for Social Ramallo. Their father, Lucho, also played football in the Ramallo area.

== Career statistics ==
As of 6 November 2020.

Appearances and goals by club, season and competition
Club	Season	League			Cup		League Cup		Continental		Other		Total	
Club	Season	Division	Apps	Goals	Apps	Goals	Apps	Goals	Apps	Goals	Apps	Goals	Apps	Goals
Defensores de Belgrano	2016–17	Torneo Federal A	10	0	0	0	—		—		0	0	10	0
Defensores de Belgrano	2017–18	Torneo Federal A	21	3	3	0	—		—		0	0	24	3
Defensores de Belgrano	2018–19	Torneo Federal A	6	0	0	0	—		—		0	0	6	0
Defensores de Belgrano	Total		37	3	3	0	—		—		0	0	40	3
Argentinos Juniors	2019–20	Primera División	0	0	0	0	0	0	0	0	0	0	0	0
Argentinos Juniors	2020–21 (Note: Soccerway counts Copa de la Liga Profesional appearances as league appearances.)	Primera División	1	0	0	0	0	0	0	0	0	0	1	0
Argentinos Juniors	Total		1	0	0	0	0	0	0	0	0	0	1	3
Career total			38	3	3	0	0	0	0	0	0	0	41	3
