= José Massaroli =

Argentine comic artist

- Born: José Maria Massaroli; September 30, 1952 (age 74) Ramallo Partido, Buenos Aires Province, Argentina
- Areas: Artist; Writer

José María Massaroli (born September 30, 1952) is an Argentine comics artist, born in Ramallo Partido.

== Career ==
He studied arts at the Instituto Ida with Angel Borisoff, Narciso Bayón and Pablo Pereyra. In 1973, he published his first comic book stories in the Manuel García Ferré's magazines: Hijitus and Larguirucho. He learned the finer points of the profession from Lito Fernández. In 1975, he commenced drawing realistic stories for the Columba Publishing house: Haakon and Tres X La Ley (by H. G. Oesterheld), and Dennis Martin (by Robin Wood). Then he worked for other publishing houses such as: Record Publishing, Universo Publishing (Italy) and D.C. Thomson (UK).

He switched to humour in 1981 and cooperated with Operación Ja Ja and Rico Tipo. In 1982, he created Orquídeo Maidana for the Caras y Caretas magazine. In 1983, he created a series of biographies for the daily newspaper La Voz (adapted for the comics medium) of Juan Moreira, Manuel Dorrego, Facundo Quiroga and Chacho Peñaloza.

In 1985, he joined the Jaime Díaz Studios as a layout man and participated in several TV series such as Aladdin, Timon & Pumbaa, Wildfire, Scooby-Doo, The Smurfs, The Jetsons, and The Pink Panther, while continuing to create terror stories for the German comic book series Gespenster Geschichten (Bastei-Verlag editions). He also published in magazines like Sex Humor, Fierro, Satiricón and Zona 84. Since 2006, he has been writing the scripts for the Los Grutynos comic strip, published in Argentine Patagonia.

In the early 1990s, Massaroli began drawing stories for Disney television and the American Disney Adventures periodical publication. He has additionally created stories with The Flintstones and illustrations for the Look and Find books. Under the guidance of Daniel Branca, he was introduced to the Danish publisher of Disney comics; Egmont. Massaroli has been drawing Duck stories for Egmont since 1997.
