= Ramallo Partido =

Ramallo Partido de Ramallo
- Department
- Flag

- location of Ramallo Partido in Buenos Aires Province
- Coordinates: 33°29′S 60°01′W
- Country: Argentina
- Established: October 25, 1864
- Founder: provincial law
- Seat: Ramallo

Government
  - Intendant: Mauro Poletti (UP)

Area
  - Total: 1,040 km^{2} (400 sq mi)

Population
  - Total: 29,179
  - Density: 28.1/km^{2} (72.7/sq mi)
- Demonym: ramallense
- Postal Code: B2915
- IFAM: BUE102
- Area Code: 03407
- Patron saint: ?
- Website: ramallo.gov.ar

Ramallo is a partido in the far north of Buenos Aires Province in Argentina.

The provincial subdivision has a population of about 29,000 inhabitants in an area of 1,040 km^{2} (400 sq mi), and its capital city is Ramallo, which is around 250 km (160 mi) from Buenos Aires.

== Ramallo massacre ==
On September 17, 1999, provincial police opened fire on a getaway car from a bank robbery, and two of the hostages in the car were killed. There are several theories to explain the police action, ranging from incompetence to a scandal involving former president Carlos Menem and the suspicious death of his son.

== Notable people ==
- Sergio Bizzio, writer and director
- Federico Luppi, actor
- José Massaroli, comics artist
- Juan María Traverso, racing driver
- La Mosca Tsé - Tsé, a rock fusion band, led by Guillermo Novellis

== Settlements ==
- Ramallo, cabecera municipal (district capital)
- Las Bahamas
- El Paraíso
- Pérez Millán
- Villa Ramallo
- Villa General Savio
