= 2019–20 Superliga Argentina =

130th season of top-tier football league in Argentina

Superliga Argentina
- Season: 2019–20
- Dates: 26 July 2019 – 9 March 2020
- Champions: Boca Juniors (34th title)
- Copa Libertadores: Boca Juniors; River Plate; Racing; Argentinos Juniors; Vélez Sarsfield; Defensa y Justicia (via Copa Sudamericana); San Lorenzo
- Copa Sudamericana: Newell's Old Boys; Talleres (C); Lanús; Rosario Central; Arsenal; Independiente
- Matches: 276
- Goals: 631 (2.29 per match)
- Top goalscorer: Rafael Santos Borré; Silvio Romero (12 goals each)
- Biggest home win: Independiente 5–0 Rosario Central (1 February 2020)
- Biggest away win: Racing 1–6 River Plate (17 August 2019); Godoy Cruz 0–5 Talleres (C) (1 December 2019)
- Highest scoring: Racing 1–6 River Plate (17 August 2019); Rosario Central 5–2 Godoy Cruz (2 November 2019); San Lorenzo 4–3 Lanús (8 March 2020)
- Longest winning run: Boca Juniors; 6 games
- Longest unbeaten run: Racing; 12 games
- Longest winless run: Patronato; 14 games
- Longest losing run: Gimnasia y Esgrima (LP); 7 games

The 2019–20 Superliga Argentina (officially the Superliga Quilmes Clásica for sponsorship reasons) was the 130th season of top-flight professional football in Argentina. The league season began on 26 July 2019 and ended on 9 March 2020.

Twenty-four teams competed in the league, twenty-two returning from the 2018–19 season and two promoted from the 2018–19 Primera B Nacional (Arsenal and Central Córdoba (SdE)). Racing were the defending champions.

On 7 March 2020, Boca Juniors won their 34th national league championship in the last round after they defeated Gimnasia y Esgrima (LP) 1–0 and, simultaneously, Atlético Tucumán and River Plate drew 1–1.

On 28 April 2020 AFA announced the abandonment of the Copa de la Superliga and the culmination of the 2019–20 season in all of its league competitions due to the COVID-19 pandemic. International berths (except for the ones allocated to the Copa de la Superliga and Copa Argentina winners) were awarded according to the aggregate table of both the Primera División and Copa de la Superliga first stage until 17 March, when the Copa de la Superliga was suspended, while no teams were relegated in this season. Relegation from Primera División was suspended until 2022.

== Competition format ==
The season was contested by 24 teams. The season began on 26 July 2019 and was scheduled to end on 31 May 2020, featuring two tournaments: the Superliga and the Copa de la Superliga. In the Superliga, which was played from 26 July 2019 to 9 March 2020, each team played the other 23 teams in a single round-robin tournament. At the conclusion of the league season, the Primera División teams took part in the Copa de la Superliga, in which they were sorted into two groups of 12 teams each. Unlike the previous season, in which only the league matches were considered for international tournament qualification and relegation, in this season, Copa de la Superliga first stage matches would also be taken into account, for a total of 34 games.

== Club information ==
=== Stadia and locations ===
Locations of the 2019–20 Argentine Primera División teams outside Greater Buenos Aires.
Locations of the 2019–20 Argentine Primera División teams within Greater Buenos Aires.

Club	City	Stadium	Capacity
Aldosivi	Mar del Plata	José María Minella	35,354
Argentinos Juniors	Buenos Aires	Diego Armando Maradona	25,000
Arsenal	Sarandí	Julio Humberto Grondona	16,300
Atlético Tucumán	Tucumán	Monumental José Fierro	32,700
Banfield	Banfield	Florencio Sola	34,901
Boca Juniors	Buenos Aires	Alberto J. Armando	49,000
Central Córdoba (SdE)	Santiago del Estero	Alfredo Terrera	16,000
Colón	Santa Fe	Brigadier General Estanislao López	40,000
Defensa y Justicia	Florencio Varela	Norberto "Tito" Tomaghello	12,000
Estudiantes (LP)	La Plata	Ciudad de La Plata	53,000
Estudiantes (LP)	La Plata	Jorge Luis Hirschi	30,000
Gimnasia y Esgrima (LP)	La Plata	Juan Carmelo Zerillo	24,544
Godoy Cruz	Godoy Cruz	Malvinas Argentinas	40,268
Huracán	Buenos Aires	Tomás Adolfo Ducó	48,314
Independiente	Avellaneda	Libertadores de América	52,853
Lanús	Lanús	Ciudad de Lanús - Néstor Díaz Pérez	46,619
Newell's Old Boys	Rosario	Marcelo Bielsa	38,095
Patronato	Paraná	Presbítero Bartolomé Grella	22,000
Racing	Avellaneda	Presidente Perón	55,389
River Plate	Buenos Aires	Monumental Antonio Vespucio Liberti	70,074
Rosario Central	Rosario	Gigante de Arroyito	41,654
San Lorenzo	Buenos Aires	Pedro Bidegain	39,494
Talleres (C)	Córdoba	Mario Alberto Kempes	57,000
Unión	Santa Fe	15 de Abril	22,852
Vélez Sarsfield	Buenos Aires	José Amalfitani	45,540

=== Personnel ===
Club	Manager	Kit manufacturer	Main sponsor
Aldosivi	(Argentina) Favio Fernández (caretaker)	Kappa	La Nueva Seguros
Argentinos Juniors	(Argentina) Diego Dabove	Umbro	Autocredito
Arsenal	(Argentina) Sergio Rondina	Sport Lyon	La Nueva Seguros
Atlético Tucumán	(Argentina) Ricardo Zielinski	Umbro	Secco
Banfield	(Argentina) Javier Sanguinetti	Givova	Seguros Orbis
Boca Juniors	(Argentina) Miguel Ángel Russo	Adidas	Qatar Airways
Central Córdoba (SdE)	(Argentina) Alexis Ferrero and (Argentina) Sebastián Scolari (caretakers)	Adhoc	Banco Santiago del Estero
Colón	(Argentina) Eduardo Domínguez	Kelme	Plus Art
Defensa y Justicia	(Argentina) Hernán Crespo	Sport Lyon	Planes ESCO
Estudiantes (LP)	(Argentina) Pablo Quatrocchi (caretaker)	Under Armour	None
Gimnasia y Esgrima (LP)	(Argentina) Mariano Messera and (Argentina) Leandro Martini	Le Coq Sportif	Escudo Seguros
Godoy Cruz	(Argentina) Daniel Oldrá (caretaker)	Kelme	CATA Internacional
Huracán	(Argentina) Israel Damonte	TBS	Banca Ciudad
Independiente	(Argentina) Fernando Berón (caretaker)	Puma	Escudo Seguros
Lanús	(Argentina) Luis Zubeldía	Peak	Yamaha
Newell's Old Boys	(Argentina) Frank Darío Kudelka	Umbro	Grupo Márquez
Patronato	(Argentina) Iván Delfino	Sport Lyon	Banco Entre Ríos
Racing	(Argentina) Sebastián Beccacece	Kappa	RCA
River Plate	(Argentina) Marcelo Gallardo	Adidas	Turkish Airlines
Rosario Central	(Argentina) Kily González	Under Armour	TCL
San Lorenzo	(Argentina) Mariano Soso	Nike	Banco Ciudad
Talleres (C)	(Uruguay) Alexander Medina	Givova	BBVA
Unión	(Argentina) Juan Manuel Azconzábal	Kappa	OSPAT
Vélez Sarsfield	(Argentina) Mauricio Pellegrino	Kappa	Hitachi

=== Managerial changes ===
Team	Outgoing manager	Manner of departure	Date of vacancy	Position in table	Replaced by	Date of appointment
Newell's Old Boys	(Venezuela) Héctor Bidoglio	Resigned	22 April 2019	Pre-season	(Argentina) Frank Darío Kudelka	24 May 2019
Huracán	(Argentina) Antonio Mohamed	Resigned	23 April 2019	Pre-season	(Argentina) Juan Pablo Vojvoda ^{1}	31 May 2019
San Lorenzo	(Argentina) Jorge Almirón	Sacked	11 May 2019	Pre-season	(Spain) Juan Antonio Pizzi ^{2}	31 May 2019
Talleres (C)	(Argentina) Juan Pablo Vojvoda	End of contract	23 May 2019	Pre-season	(Uruguay) Alexander Medina	6 June 2019
Defensa y Justicia	(Argentina) Sebastián Beccacece	End of contract	29 May 2019	Pre-season	(Argentina) Mariano Soso	5 June 2019
Independiente	(Argentina) Ariel Holan	Sacked	30 May 2019	Pre-season	(Argentina) Sebastián Beccacece	31 May 2019
Superliga changes
Godoy Cruz	(Argentina) Lucas Bernardi	Sacked	19 August 2019	23rd	(Argentina) Javier Patalano	19 August 2019
Gimnasia y Esgrima (LP)	(Argentina) Darío Ortiz	Resigned	31 August 2019	24th	(Argentina) Diego Maradona	5 September 2019
Banfield	(Argentina) Hernán Crespo	Sacked	31 August 2019	18th	(Argentina) Julio César Falcioni	3 September 2019
Huracán	(Argentina) Juan Pablo Vojvoda	Sacked	15 September 2019	19th	(Argentina) Israel Damonte ^{3}	2 January 2020
Godoy Cruz	(Argentina) Javier Patalano	Replaced	24 September 2019	23rd	(Argentina) Daniel Oldrá	24 September 2019
Aldosivi	(Argentina) Gustavo Álvarez	Resigned	27 September 2019	21st	(Argentina) Guillermo Hoyos ^{4}	10 October 2019
Independiente	(Argentina) Sebastián Beccacece	Resigned	26 October 2019	14th	(Argentina) Lucas Pusineri ^{5}	23 December 2019
San Lorenzo	(Spain) Juan Antonio Pizzi	Resigned	31 October 2019	12th	(Argentina) Diego Monarriz ^{6}	1 November 2019
Patronato	(Argentina) Mario Sciacqua	Resigned	26 November 2019	21st	(Argentina) Gustavo Álvarez ^{7}	1 December 2019
Colón	(Argentina) Pablo Lavallén	Mutual agreement	6 December 2019	19th	(Argentina) Diego Osella ^{8}	18 December 2019
Boca Juniors	(Argentina) Gustavo Alfaro	End of contract	8 December 2019	1st	(Argentina) Miguel Ángel Russo	27 December 2019
Godoy Cruz	(Argentina) Daniel Oldrá	Replaced	9 December 2019	24th	(Argentina) Mario Sciacqua	9 December 2019
Racing	(Argentina) Eduardo Coudet	Signed by Internacional	14 December 2019	8th	(Argentina) Sebastián Beccacece	16 December 2019
Defensa y Justicia	(Argentina) Mariano Soso	Resigned	21 January 2020	14th	(Argentina) Hernán Crespo ^{9}	27 January 2020
San Lorenzo	(Argentina) Diego Monarriz	Mutual agreement	22 February 2020	10th	(Argentina) Mariano Soso ^{10}	16 March 2020
Estudiantes (LP)	(Argentina) Gabriel Milito	Resigned	4 March 2020	13th	(Argentina) Leandro Desábato	5 March 2020
Inter-tournament changes
Colón	(Argentina) Diego Osella	Resigned	8 March 2020	N/A	(Argentina) Eduardo Domínguez	9 March 2020
Vélez Sarsfield	(Argentina) Gabriel Heinze	Resigned	9 March 2020	N/A	(Argentina) Mauricio Pellegrino ^{11}	16 April 2020
Unión	(Argentina) Leonardo Madelón	Resigned	12 March 2020	N/A	(Argentina) Juan Manuel Azconzábal ^{12}	1 July 2020
Copa de la Superliga changes
Central Córdoba (SdE)	(Argentina) Gustavo Coleoni	Resigned	17 March 2020	9th Zone A	(Argentina) Alfredo Berti	1 June 2020
Inter-tournament changes
Godoy Cruz	(Argentina) Mario Sciacqua	Sacked	15 May 2020	N/A	(Argentina) Diego Martínez	26 May 2020
Banfield	(Argentina) Julio César Falcioni	End of contract	29 May 2020	N/A	(Argentina) Javier Sanguinetti	1 June 2020
Rosario Central	(Argentina) Diego Cocca	End of contract	16 June 2020	N/A	(Argentina) Kily González	23 June 2020
Copa Diego Armando Maradona changes
Gimnasia y Esgrima (LP)	(Argentina) Diego Maradona	Deceased	25 November 2020	3rd Zone 6	(Argentina) Mariano Messera and (Argentina) Leandro Martini ^{13}	26 November 2020
Central Córdoba (SdE)	(Argentina) Alfredo Berti	Sacked	4 December 2020	3rd Zone 2	(Argentina) Alexis Ferrero and (Argentina) Sebastián Scolari ^{14}	6 December 2020
Patronato	(Argentina) Gustavo Álvarez	Sacked	15 December 2020	6th Grupo A	(Argentina) Iván Delfino ^{15}	28 December 2020
Estudiantes (LP)	(Argentina) Leandro Desábato	Resigned	23 December 2020	4th Group B	(Argentina) Pablo Quatrocchi ^{16}	24 December 2020
Godoy Cruz	(Argentina) Diego Martínez	Resigned	28 December 2020	6th Group B	(Argentina) Daniel Oldrá ^{17}	29 December 2020
Independiente	(Argentina) Lucas Pusineri	End of contract	7 January 2021	5th Group A	(Argentina) Fernando Berón ^{18}	8 January 2021
Aldosivi	(Argentina) Guillermo Hoyos	Sacked	9 January 2021	6th Group A	(Argentina) Favio Fernández ^{19}	11 January 2021

Interim managers

1. Néstor Apuzzo was interim manager in the 2019 Copa Libertadores group B 6th round and the 2018–19 Copa Argentina round of 64.
2. Diego Monarriz was interim manager in the 2018–19 Copa Argentina round of 64.
3. (Argentina) Néstor Apuzzo was interim manager in the 7th–16th rounds.
4. (Argentina) Fabio Radaelli was interim manager in the 9th round.
5. (Argentina) Fernando Berón was interim manager in the 11th–13th, 15th–16th and the postponed 2nd rounds.
6. Interim manager, but later promoted to manager.
7. (Argentina) Martín De León was interim manager in the 15th round.
8. (Argentina) Pablo Bonaveri was interim manager in the postponed 13th round.
9. (Argentina) Pablo De Muner was interim manager in the 17th round.
10. (Argentina) Leandro Romagnoli and (Argentina) Hugo Tocalli were interim managers in the 22nd–23rd rounds and the 2020 Copa de la Superliga 1st round.
11. (Argentina) Guillermo Morigi was interim manager in the 2020 Copa de la Superliga 1st round.
12. (Argentina) Marcelo Mosset was interim manager in the 2020 Copa de la Superliga 1st round.
13. Interim managers, but later promoted to managers.
14. Interim managers in the Copa Diego Armando Maradona until the end of the tournament.
15. (Argentina) Gabriel Graciani was interim manager in the Copa Diego Armando Maradona Fase Complementación 2nd–3rd rounds.
16. Interim manager in the Copa Diego Armando Maradona until the end of the tournament.
17. Interim manager in the 2019–20 Copa Argentina round of 64 and the Copa Diego Armando Maradona until the end of the tournament.
18. Interim manager in the Copa Diego Armando Maradona until the end of the tournament.
19. Interim manager in the Copa Diego Armando Maradona until the end of the tournament.

=== Foreign players ===
Club	Player 1	Player 2	Player 3	Player 4	Player 5	Player 6
Aldosivi	(Uruguay) Federico Gino	(Paraguay) Mario López Quintana	(Paraguay) Marcos Miers	(Colombia) Sebastián Rincón		
Argentinos Juniors	(Colombia) Edwar López	(Uruguay) Jonathan Sandoval	(Uruguay) Santiago Silva			
Arsenal	(Uruguay) Jhonatan Candia					
Atlético Tucumán						
Banfield	(Colombia) Iván Arboleda	(Uruguay) Junior Arias	(Nigeria) Feyiseitan Asagidigbi	(Uruguay) Esteban Conde	(Colombia) Reinaldo Lenis	(Paraguay) Pablo Velázquez
Boca Juniors	(Paraguay) Júnior Alonso	(Colombia) Jorman Campuzano	(Venezuela) Jan Carlos Hurtado	(Colombia) Sebastián Villa	(Peru) Carlos Zambrano	
Central Córdoba (SdE)	(Venezuela) Dany Cure	(Colombia) Joao Rodríguez	(Paraguay) Hugo Vera Oviedo			
Colón	(Uruguay) Leonardo Burián	(Colombia) Guillermo Celis	(Uruguay) Mauro Da Luz	(Paraguay) Marcelo Estigarribia	(Uruguay) Rafael García	(Colombia) Wilson Morelo
Defensa y Justicia	(Uruguay) Washington Camacho	(Colombia) Mauricio Duarte	(Colombia) Raúl Loaiza	(Paraguay) Aldo Maiz	(Paraguay) Braian Ojeda	
Estudiantes (LP)	(Uruguay) Martín Cauteruccio	(Chile) Juan Fuentes	(Uruguay) Diego García			
Gimnasia y Esgrima (LP)	(Colombia) Jonathan Agudelo	(Uruguay) Brahian Alemán	(Paraguay) Víctor Ayala	(Colombia) Harrinson Mancilla	(Venezuela) Jesús Vargas	
Godoy Cruz	(Uruguay) Christian Almeida	(Ecuador) Jaime Ayoví	(Peru) Wilder Cartagena	(Uruguay) Miguel Merentiel	(Paraguay) Danilo Ortiz	(Paraguay) Richard Prieto
Huracán	(Paraguay) Saúl Salcedo	(Paraguay) Antony Silva				
Independiente	(Uruguay) Renzo Bacchia	(Uruguay) Carlos Benavídez	(Uruguay) Martín Campaña	(Paraguay) Cecilio Domínguez	(Colombia) Andrés Felipe Roa	(Uruguay) Gastón Silva
Lanús	(Paraguay) Pablo Martínez					
Newell's Old Boys	(Uruguay) Ángelo Gabrielli	(São Tomé and Príncipe) Luís Leal				
Patronato	(Uruguay) Mathías Abero	(Paraguay) Gabriel Ávalos	(Uruguay) Hugo Silveira			
Racing	(Chile) Marcelo Díaz	(Chile) Eugenio Mena	(Paraguay) Matías Rojas			
River Plate	(Colombia) Rafael Santos Borré	(Colombia) Jorge Carrascal	(Uruguay) Nicolás de la Cruz	(Chile) Paulo Díaz	(Colombia) Juan Fernando Quintero	(Paraguay) Robert Rojas
Rosario Central	(Uruguay) Cristian González	(Uruguay) Federico Martínez	(Uruguay) Sebastián Ribas	(Uruguay) Diego Zabala		
San Lorenzo	(Uruguay) Ramón Arias	(Paraguay) Adam Bareiro	(Uruguay) Diego Rodríguez	(Paraguay) Ángel Romero	(Paraguay) Óscar Romero	
Talleres (C)	(Brazil) Guilherme Parede	(Colombia) Dayro Moreno	(Colombia) Rafa Pérez	(Colombia) Diego Valoyes		
Unión	(Uruguay) Sebastián Assis	(Uruguay) Javier Cabrera	(Uruguay) Javier Méndez	(Colombia) Jorge Zules Caicedo		
Vélez Sarsfield	(Peru) Luis Abram	(Uruguay) Matías de los Santos	(Ecuador) Alexander Domínguez	(Chile) Pablo Galdames	(Paraguay) Cristian Núñez	

==== Players with 30 months in a row on the same team ====
- (Uruguay) Santiago García (Godoy Cruz) has played 30 months in a row on the same team, therefore, he does not take foreign slot and Godoy Cruz were allowed to sign a seventh foreign player.

==== Players holding Argentinian dual nationality ====
They do not take foreign slot.

- (United States) Matko Miljevic (Argentinos Juniors)
- (United States) Joel Soñora (Arsenal)
- (Switzerland) Dylan Gissi (Atlético Tucumán)
- (Italy) Dani Osvaldo (Banfield)
- (Colombia) Frank Fabra (Boca Juniors)
- (Paraguay) Lucas Barrios (Gimnasia y Esgrima (LP))
- (Armenia) Norberto Briasco-Balekian (Huracán)
- (Chile) Pablo Hernández (Independiente)
- (United States) Alan Soñora (Independiente)
- (Chile) Gabriel Arias (Racing)
- (Venezuela) Carlos Olses (Racing)
- (Paraguay) Andrés Cubas (Talleres (C))
- (Italy) José Mauri (Talleres (C))

Source: AFA

== League table ==
Pos	Team	Pld	W	D	L	GF	GA	GD	Pts	Qualification
1	Boca Juniors (C)	23	14	6	3	35	8	+27	48	Qualification for Copa Libertadores group stage
2	River Plate	23	14	5	4	41	18	+23	47	
3	Vélez Sarsfield	23	11	6	6	27	14	+13	39	
4	Racing	23	9	12	2	28	23	+5	39	
5	Argentinos Juniors	23	10	9	4	22	17	+5	39	
6	Defensa y Justicia	23	10	6	7	26	18	+8	36	
7	Lanús	23	9	9	5	32	29	+3	36	
8	San Lorenzo	23	11	3	9	32	30	+2	36	
9	Rosario Central	23	9	9	5	31	29	+2	36	
10	Newell's Old Boys	23	9	8	6	33	25	+8	35	
11	Arsenal	23	9	7	7	37	32	+5	34	
12	Talleres (C)	23	10	4	9	34	30	+4	34	
13	Estudiantes (LP)	23	8	6	9	23	22	+1	30	
14	Independiente	23	8	5	10	27	25	+2	29	
15	Atlético Tucumán	23	7	8	8	22	25	−3	29	
16	Unión	23	7	6	10	21	30	−9	27	
17	Banfield	23	6	8	9	19	23	−4	26	
18	Central Córdoba (SdE)	23	6	8	9	21	29	−8	26	
19	Gimnasia y Esgrima (LP)	23	6	5	12	22	23	−1	23	
20	Patronato	23	5	8	10	22	34	−12	23	
21	Huracán	23	5	7	11	17	27	−10	22	
22	Aldosivi	23	6	4	13	20	35	−15	22	
23	Colón	23	5	3	15	17	39	−22	18	
24	Godoy Cruz	23	6	0	17	22	46	−24	18	

Source: AFA
Rules for classification: 1) points; 2) play-off (only if needed to decide championship); 3) goal difference; 4) goals scored; 5) head-to-head points; 6) head-to-head goal difference; 7) head-to-head goals scored.
(C) Champions

2019–20 Argentine Primera División champions

34th title

== Results ==
Teams played every other team once (either at home or away) completing a total of 23 rounds.

Home \ Away	ALD	ARG	ARS	ATU	BAN	BOC	CCO	COL	DYJ	EST	GLP	GOD	HUR	IND	LAN	NOB	PAT	RAC	RIV	ROS	SLO	TAL	UNI	VEL
Aldosivi	—	0–0	—	3–0	—	—	0–2	—	1–0	—	0–3	—	—	0–0	2–0	—	1–1	—	1–2	—	1–3	—	1–2	—
Argentinos Juniors	—	—	2–1	—	3–2	—	3–1	—	—	1–1	1–0	—	—	—	0–0	1–0	1–1	1–1	1–1	2–1	—	1–0	—	—
Arsenal	4–0	—	—	—	1–0	—	2–2	2–1	—	3–0	—	—	—	—	1–1	1–1	—	—	3–3	—	0–2	1–1	4–1	0–4
Atlético Tucumán	—	0–2	1–0	—	—	—	—	—	1–1	—	—	1–0	—	0–1	2–2	2–2	2–0	—	1–1	1–2	2–2	2–1	—	—
Banfield	0–1	—	—	1–2	—	0–1	—	—	—	1–0	1–1	—	0–3	—	—	—	3–3	—	—	1–1	0–1	0–1	3–3	1–0
Boca Juniors	2–0	1–1	5–1	2–0	—	—	—	—	—	1–0	1–0	3–0	0–0	0–0	—	1–1	—	0–1	—	—	—	—	2–0	—
Central Córdoba (SdE)	—	—	—	1–0	1–1	0–4	—	1–0	1–2	0–1	—	1–0	—	—	—	—	3–2	0–0	—	1–1	—	—	—	0–0
Colón	0–2	1–0	—	0–2	0–1	0–4	—	—	—	3–2	2–1	2–1	—	—	—	—	0–1	1–1	—	1–1	2–1	—	—	—
Defensa y Justicia	—	0–0	0–3	—	0–0	0–1	—	0–0	—	—	—	2–0	0–1	0–1	2–0	—	2–0	—	—	3–0	—	4–1	—	—
Estudiantes (LP)	1–0	—	—	1–1	—	—	—	—	1–2	—	—	—	0–0	3–0	—	—	1–0	1–2	0–2	3–0	—	1–0	3–1	0–1
Gimnasia y Esgrima (LP)	—	—	0–1	1–0	—	—	2–1	—	0–1	0–1	—	—	—	—	—	—	1–1	1–2	0–2	—	0–1	—	0–1	0–0
Godoy Cruz	3–2	0–1	0–2	—	0–2	—	—	—	—	2–1	2–4	—	2–1	1–2	—	—	—	—	0–1	—	—	0–5	1–3	—
Huracán	0–2	0–0	0–2	0–0	—	—	1–1	2–0	—	—	1–1	—	—	1–0	0–1	—	—	—	0–4	—	2–0	—	—	—
Independiente	—	0–1	1–1	—	0–1	—	3–0	2–0	—	—	0–1	—	—	—	2–2	2–3	—	—	1–2	5–0	2–1	3–2	—	—
Lanús	—	—	—	—	0–1	2–1	1–0	3–2	—	1–1	1–1	2–0	—	—	—	1–1	—	1–0	—	1–1	—	—	—	3–1
Newell's Old Boys	2–0	—	—	—	0–0	—	2–0	4–0	2–0	0–0	0–4	0–2	4–1	—	—	—	—	—	2–3	—	1–0	—	2–0	—
Patronato	—	—	2–2	—	—	0–2	—	—	—	—	—	0–2	2–1	1–0	1–1	1–3	—	1–1	—	—	—	3–2	1–0	0–1
Racing	2–0	—	2–1	1–1	0–0	—	—	—	1–1	—	—	3–1	1–0	1–0	—	1–1	—	—	1–6	—	—	—	0–0	—
River Plate	—	—	—	—	1–0	0–0	2–0	2–1	1–1	—	—	—	—	—	3–0	—	2–0	—	—	0–1	0–1	0–1	—	1–2
Rosario Central	5–1	—	3–1	—	—	1–0	—	—	—	—	1–0	5–2	2–1	—	—	1–1	1–1	1–1	—	—	—	1–0	—	0–1
San Lorenzo	—	3–0	—	—	—	0–2	1–4	—	1–3	1–1	—	3–2	—	—	4–3	—	2–0	0–1	—	2–2	—	—	2–1	1–0
Talleres (C)	2–1	—	—	—	—	1–2	1–1	2–0	—	—	2–1	—	4–2	—	2–4	1–0	—	3–3	—	—	1–0	—	0–0	1–0
Unión	—	1–0	—	0–1	—	—	0–0	1–0	2–1	—	—	—	1–0	2–2	1–2	—	—	—	1–2	0–0	—	—	—	0–3
Vélez Sarsfield	1–1	2–0	—	1–0	—	0–0	—	3–1	0–1	—	—	0–1	0–0	2–0	—	3–1	—	2–2	—	—	—	—	—	—

Source: AFA
Legend: Blue = home team win; Yellow = draw; Red = away team win.

== Season statistics ==
=== Top goalscorers ===
Rank	Player	Club	Goals
1	(Argentina) Silvio Romero	Independiente	12
1	(Colombia) Rafael Santos Borré	River Plate	12
3	(Argentina) José Sand	Lanús	10
4	(Argentina) Carlos Tevez	Boca Juniors	9
4	(Argentina) Cristian Tarragona	Patronato	9
4	(Argentina) Nahuel Bustos	Talleres (C)	9
7	(Argentina) Gabriel Hauche	Argentinos Juniors	7
7	(Argentina) Nicolás Giménez	Arsenal	7
7	(Argentina) Matías Suárez	River Plate	7
7	(Argentina) Bruno Pittón	San Lorenzo	7
7	(Argentina) Maximiliano Romero	Vélez Sarsfield	7

Source: AFA

=== Top assists ===
Rank	Player	Club	Assists
1	(Argentina) Mariano Bíttolo	Newell's Old Boys	7
1	(Argentina) Matías Suárez	River Plate	7
3	(Argentina) Luis Miguel Rodríguez	Colón	6
4	(Uruguay) Nicolás de la Cruz	River Plate	5
4	(Paraguay) Ángel Romero	San Lorenzo	5
4	(Colombia) Dayro Moreno	Talleres (C)	5

Source: AFA

== International qualification ==
International qualification for the 2021 season presented a change from previous ones. The 2019–20 Superliga champions, 2020 Copa de la Superliga champions and 2019–20 Copa Argentina champions would earn a berth to the 2021 Copa Libertadores, however, with the decision by AFA to end the season on 28 April, only the Superliga champions were awarded a berth. The berth originally allocated to the Copa de la Superliga champions went instead to the winners of the 2020 Copa de la Liga Profesional to be played from October 2020 to January 2021, while the berth for the Copa Argentina champions remained in place, provided that government directives allow for the realization of that competition.

The remaining berths to the 2021 Copa Libertadores as well as the ones to the 2021 Copa Sudamericana were determined by an aggregate table of the 2019–20 Superliga and 2020 Copa de la Superliga first stage tournaments. The top three teams in the aggregate table not already qualified for any international tournament qualified for the Copa Libertadores, while the next six teams qualified for the Copa Sudamericana. On 11 December 2020, with the confirmation that the Copa Argentina would not be completed in time to award its winner the Argentina 3 berth into the 2021 Copa Libertadores, AFA decided to transfer the berth to the best team of the aggregate table of the season not yet qualified, and all other lower berths were moved down as a result.

=== Aggregate table ===
Pos	Team	Pld	W	D	L	GF	GA	GD	Pts	Qualification
1	Boca Juniors	24	15	6	3	39	9	+30	51	Qualification for Copa Libertadores group stage (Note: Boca Juniors qualified for the Copa Libertadores group stage by winning the 2019–20 Superliga and the 2020 Copa de la Liga Profesional. Thus, the Copa Libertadores group stage awarded to the Copa de la Liga Profesional champions was passed down the table.)
2	River Plate	24	14	5	5	41	19	+22	47	Qualification for Copa Libertadores group stage (Note: Defensa y Justicia qualified for the Copa Libertadores group stage by winning the 2020 Copa Sudamericana.)
3	Racing	24	10	12	2	32	26	+6	42	Qualification for Copa Libertadores group stage
4	Argentinos Juniors	24	11	9	4	23	17	+6	42	Qualification for Copa Libertadores group stage
5	Vélez Sarsfield	24	11	6	7	27	15	+12	39	Qualification for Copa Libertadores group stage
6	Defensa y Justicia	24	11	6	7	28	19	+9	39	Qualification for Copa Libertadores group stage
7	San Lorenzo	24	12	3	9	35	31	+4	39	Qualification for Copa Libertadores second stage
8	Newell's Old Boys	24	10	8	6	35	26	+9	38	Qualification for Copa Sudamericana group stage
9	Talleres (C)	24	11	4	9	37	30	+7	37	Qualification for Copa Sudamericana group stage
10	Lanús	24	9	9	6	32	30	+2	36	Qualification for Copa Sudamericana group stage
11	Rosario Central	24	9	9	6	32	32	0	36	Qualification for Copa Sudamericana group stage
12	Arsenal	24	9	8	7	38	33	+5	35	Qualification for Copa Sudamericana group stage
13	Independiente	24	9	5	10	28	25	+3	32	Qualification for Copa Sudamericana group stage
14	Atlético Tucumán	24	8	8	8	23	25	−2	32	
15	Estudiantes (LP)	24	8	6	10	24	24	0	30	
16	Unión	24	7	7	10	22	31	−9	28	
17	Banfield	24	6	9	9	19	23	−4	27	
18	Central Córdoba (SdE)	24	6	8	10	22	31	−9	26	
19	Gimnasia y Esgrima (LP)	24	6	6	12	22	23	−1	24	
20	Patronato	24	5	8	11	23	37	−14	23	
21	Huracán	24	5	7	12	17	30	−13	22	
22	Aldosivi	24	6	4	14	23	39	−16	22	
23	Colón	24	6	3	15	20	40	−20	21	
24	Godoy Cruz	24	6	0	18	23	50	−27	18	

Source: AFA
Rules for classification: 1) points; 2) goal difference; 3) goals scored; 4) head-to-head points; 5) head-to-head goal difference; 6) head-to-head goals scored.

== Relegation ==
Relegation at the end of the season would be based on coefficients, which take into consideration the points obtained by the clubs during the present season (aggregate table points) and the two previous seasons (only seasons at the top flight are counted). The total tally is then divided by the number of games played in the top flight over those three seasons, and the average is calculated. The three teams with the worst average at the end of the season would have been relegated to Primera B Nacional, however, with the decision by AFA to declare the culmination of the season it was also decided that no teams would be relegated.

Pos	Team	2017–18 Pts	2018–19 Pts	2019–20 Pts	Total Pts	Total Pld	Avg
1	Boca Juniors	58	51	51	160	76	2.105
2	Racing	45	57	42	144	76	1.895
3	River Plate	45	45	47	137	76	1.803
4	Defensa y Justicia	44	53	39	136	76	1.789
5	Vélez Sarsfield	38	40	39	117	76	1.539
6	Independiente	46	38	32	116	76	1.526
7	Talleres (C)	46	33	37	116	76	1.526
8	San Lorenzo	50	23	39	112	76	1.474
9	Arsenal	—	—	35	35	24	1.458
10	Atlético Tucumán	36	42	32	110	76	1.447
11	Unión	43	36	28	107	76	1.408
12	Godoy Cruz	56	32	18	106	76	1.395
13	Argentinos Juniors	41	22	42	105	76	1.382
14	Huracán	48	35	22	105	76	1.382
15	Lanús	29	34	36	99	76	1.303
16	Newell's Old Boys	29	29	38	96	76	1.263
17	Estudiantes (LP)	36	29	30	95	76	1.25
18	Rosario Central	32	26	36	94	76	1.237
19	Banfield	35	29	27	91	76	1.197
20	Aldosivi	—	33	22	55	49	1.122
21	Colón	41	23	21	85	76	1.118
22	Central Córdoba (SdE)	—	—	26	26	24	1.083
23	Patronato	33	26	23	82	76	1.079
24	Gimnasia y Esgrima (LP)	27	29	24	80	76	1.053

Source: AFA

== See also ==
- 2020 Copa de la Superliga
- 2019–20 Primera B Nacional
- 2019–20 Torneo Federal A
- 2019–20 Copa Argentina
