= 2020 Copa de la Superliga =

2020 Copa de la Superliga Argentina
Tournament details
- Country: Argentina
- Dates: 13 March – 28 April 2020 (1 match played on 23 December 2020)
- Teams: 24

Final positions
- Champions: None; abandoned

Tournament statistics
- Matches played: 11
- Goals scored: 33 (3 per match)
- Top goal scorer(s): Matías Rojas; Óscar Romero (2 goals each)

The 2020 Copa de la Superliga Argentina (named Copa de la Superliga Quilmes Clásica 2020 for sponsoring purposes) was the second edition of the Copa de la Superliga Argentina, Argentina's football league cup competition open to all 24 participants in the Superliga Argentina for the 2019–20 season. The competition began on 13 March 2020 and was originally scheduled to end on 31 May 2020, with the champions qualifying for the 2021 Copa Libertadores and 2020 Trofeo de Campeones.

On 12 March 2020, AFA announced that all the matches of Copa de la Superliga had to be played behind closed doors to prevent the spread of COVID-19. One day later, River Plate announced the suspension of all sports activities in the club, the closure of all their facilities, and refused to play the Atlético Tucumán match scheduled for 14 March 2020 (first round) at Estadio Monumental Antonio Vespucio Liberti. As River Plate announced, the stadium was locked up and the match could not be played after referee Germán Delfino and Atlético Tucumán officials were unable to enter. On 6 October 2021, Atlético Tucumán was awarded a 0–1 win by forfeit.

On 17 March 2020, AFA suspended the tournament and on 28 April 2020 they announced the abandonment of the Copa de la Superliga and the culmination of the 2019–20 season in all of its competitions due to the coronavirus pandemic. However, on 11 December 2020, with the confirmation that the 2019–20 Copa Argentina would not be completed in time to award its winner the Argentina 3 berth into the 2021 Copa Libertadores and AFA's subsequent decision to transfer the berth to the aggregate table of the 2019–20 season, it was also confirmed that the Copa de la Superliga first round match between Defensa y Justicia and Estudiantes (LP) needed to be played in order to determine the aggregate table of the 2019–20 season as well as the qualifiers for the 2021 Copa Libertadores and 2021 Copa Sudamericana. The match, which was not played at the time due to Defensa y Justicia's involvement in the 2020 Copa Libertadores, was eventually scheduled for 23 December 2020.

== Format ==
The 24 teams were sorted into two zones of 12 teams each. They would play every other team once (either at home or away) completing a total of 11 rounds. The top two teams would advance to the semi-finals. The semi-finals and the final would be played as single-leg ties at a neutral ground.

In the semi-finals, if teams were tied, a penalty shoot-out would be used to decide the winners. In the final, 30 minutes of extra time would be played if both teams are tied, and if still tied at the end of extra time, the champions would be decided in a penalty shoot-out.

Unlike the previous season, in which only the league matches were considered for international tournaments qualification and relegation, in this season Copa de la Superliga first stage matches were also taken into account.

== Schedule ==
Round	Dates
First Stage	13 March–17 May 2020
Semi-finals	24 May 2020
Final	31 May 2020

== First stage ==
The 24 teams were sorted into two zones of 12 teams each. Teams in each zone would play one another in a round-robin basis, with the top two teams of each zone advancing to the semi-finals.

=== Zone A ===
==== Standings ====
Pos	Team	Pld	W	D	L	GF	GA	GD	Pts
1	Boca Juniors	1	1	0	0	4	1	+3	3
2	San Lorenzo	1	1	0	0	3	1	+2	3
3	Newell's Old Boys	1	1	0	0	2	1	+1	3
4	Independiente	1	1	0	0	1	0	+1	3
5	Arsenal	1	0	1	0	1	1	0	1
6	Unión	1	0	1	0	1	1	0	1
7	Banfield	1	0	1	0	0	0	0	1
8	Gimnasia y Esgrima (LP)	1	0	1	0	0	0	0	1
9	Central Córdoba (SdE)	1	0	0	1	1	2	−1	0
10	Vélez Sarsfield	1	0	0	1	0	1	−1	0
11	Patronato	1	0	0	1	1	3	−2	0
12	Godoy Cruz	1	0	0	1	1	4	−3	0

Source: AFA
Rules for classification: 1) points; 2) goal difference; 3) goals scored; 4) head-to-head points; 5) head-to-head goal difference; 6) head-to-head goals scored.

==== Results ====
Home \ Away	ARS	BAN	BOC	CCO	GLP	GOD	IND	NOB	PAT	SLO	UNI	VEL
Arsenal	—	—	—	—	—	—	—	—	—	—	—	—
Banfield	—	—	—	—	—	—	—	—	—	—	—	—
Boca Juniors	—	—	—	—	—	—	—	—	—	—	—	—
Central Córdoba (SdE)	—	—	—	—	—	—	—	1–2	—	—	—	—
Gimnasia y Esgrima (LP)	—	0–0	—	—	—	—	—	—	—	—	—	—
Godoy Cruz	—	—	1–4	—	—	—	—	—	—	—	—	—
Independiente	—	—	—	—	—	—	—	—	—	—	—	1–0
Newell's Old Boys	—	—	—	—	—	—	—	—	—	—	—	—
Patronato	—	—	—	—	—	—	—	—	—	1–3	—	—
San Lorenzo	—	—	—	—	—	—	—	—	—	—	—	—
Unión	1–1	—	—	—	—	—	—	—	—	—	—	—
Vélez Sarsfield	—	—	—	—	—	—	—	—	—	—	—	—

Source: AFA
Legend: Blue = home team win; Yellow = draw; Red = away team win.

=== Zone B ===
==== Standings ====
Pos	Team	Pld	W	D	L	GF	GA	GD	Pts
1	Talleres (C)	1	1	0	0	3	0	+3	3
2	Colón	1	1	0	0	3	1	+2	3
3	Racing	1	1	0	0	4	3	+1	3
4	Defensa y Justicia	1	1	0	0	2	1	+1	3
5	Argentinos Juniors	1	1	0	0	1	0	+1	3
6	Atlético Tucumán	1	1	0	0	1	0	+1	3
7	Aldosivi	1	0	0	1	3	4	−1	0
8	Estudiantes (LP)	1	0	0	1	1	2	−1	0
9	Lanús	1	0	0	1	0	1	−1	0
10	River Plate	1	0	0	1	0	1	−1	0
11	Rosario Central	1	0	0	1	1	3	−2	0
12	Huracán	1	0	0	1	0	3	−3	0

Source: AFA
Rules for classification: 1) points; 2) goal difference; 3) goals scored; 4) head-to-head points; 5) head-to-head goal difference; 6) head-to-head goals scored.

==== Results ====
Home \ Away	ALD	ARG	ATU	COL	DYJ	EST	HUR	LAN	RAC	RIV	ROS	TAL
Aldosivi	—	—	—	—	—	—	—	—	3–4	—	—	—
Argentinos Juniors	—	—	—	—	—	—	—	—	—	—	—	—
Atlético Tucumán	—	—	—	—	—	—	—	—	—	—	—	—
Colón	—	—	—	—	—	—	—	—	—	—	—	—
Defensa y Justicia	—	—	—	—	—	2–1	—	—	—	—	—	—
Estudiantes (LP)	—	—	—	—	—	—	—	—	—	—	—	—
Huracán	—	—	—	—	—	—	—	—	—	—	—	0–3
Lanús	—	0–1	—	—	—	—	—	—	—	—	—	—
Racing	—	—	—	—	—	—	—	—	—	—	—	—
River Plate	—	—	0–1^{[1]}	—	—	—	—	—	—	—	—	—
Rosario Central	—	—	—	1–3	—	—	—	—	—	—	—	—
Talleres (C)	—	—	—	—	—	—	—	—	—	—	—	—

Source: AFA
Legend: Blue = home team win; Yellow = draw; Red = away team win.

^{1} Atlético Tucumán awarded 0–1 win by forfeit.

== Semi-finals ==
=== Match F1 ===
24 May 2020

Winners Zone A	Cancelled	Runners-up Zone B

=== Match F2 ===
24 May 2020

Winners Zone B	Cancelled	Runners-up Zone A

== Final ==
31 May 2020

Winners Match F1	Cancelled	Winners Match F2

== Statistics ==
=== Top goalscorers ===
Rank	Player	Club	Goals
1	(Paraguay) Matías Rojas	Racing	2
1	(Paraguay) Óscar Romero	San Lorenzo	2

Source: AFA

== See also ==
- 2019–20 Argentine Primera División
