= Pérez Millán =

- Town
- Location within Buenos Aires Province
- Coordinates: 33°46′S 60°05′W
- Country: Argentina
- Province: Buenos Aires
- Partidos: Ramallo
- Established: July 27, 1908
- Elevation: 50 m (160 ft)

Population (2001 Census)
  - Total: 3,633
- Time zone: UTC−3 (ART)
- CPA Base: B 2933
- Area code: +291 457-XXXX
- Climate: Dfc

Pérez Millán is a town located in the Ramallo Partido in the province of Buenos Aires, Argentina.

== History ==
Pérez Millán was founded on July 27, 1908. The town was named after its founder, Narcisa Pérez Millán, whose children would cede the land to create the town. The community had been previously platted in April of the same year. The town was founded as a result of the construction of a railway connecting Buenos Aires and Rosario.

== Economy ==
The town's economy is primarily based around agriculture, as well as the refrigeration industry.

== Population ==
The town had a population of 3,633 as of the 2001 census.
