= Favio Fernández =

Argentine footballer

Personal information
- Full name: Favio Damián Fernández
- Date of birth: 25 July 1972 (age 54)
- Place of birth: Quilmes, Argentina
- Height: 1.84 m (6 ft 0 in)
- Position: Midfielder

Youth career
- Gimnasia La Plata

Senior career*
| Years | Team | Apps | (Gls) |
| 1992–1996 | Gimnasia La Plata | 114 | (11) |
| 1996 | Espanyol | 2 | (0) |
| 1996–1998 | Independiente | 46 | (2) |
| 1998–2001 | Gimnasia La Plata | 88 | (7) |
| 2002 | Unión de Santa Fe | 5 | (0) |
| 2002 | Deportivo Táchira | 7 | (0) |
| 2003–2004 | Huracán | 24 | (2) |

Managerial career
- 2011–2015: Gimnasia La Plata (reserves)
- 2016: Temperley (reserves)
- 2016–2017: Temperley (assistant)
- 2017–2019: Aldosivi (assistant)
- 2020–2022: Aldosivi (reserves)
- 2021: Aldosivi (interim)
- 2022: Aldosivi (interim)
- * Club domestic league appearances and goals

Favio Damián Fernández (born 25 July 1972, in Quilmes) is a retired Argentine football coach and former player.

A midfielder, Fernández played for a number of clubs in Argentina, RCD Espanyol in Spain, and Deportivo Táchira in Venezuela.
