= Ramallo, Buenos Aires =

Ramallo
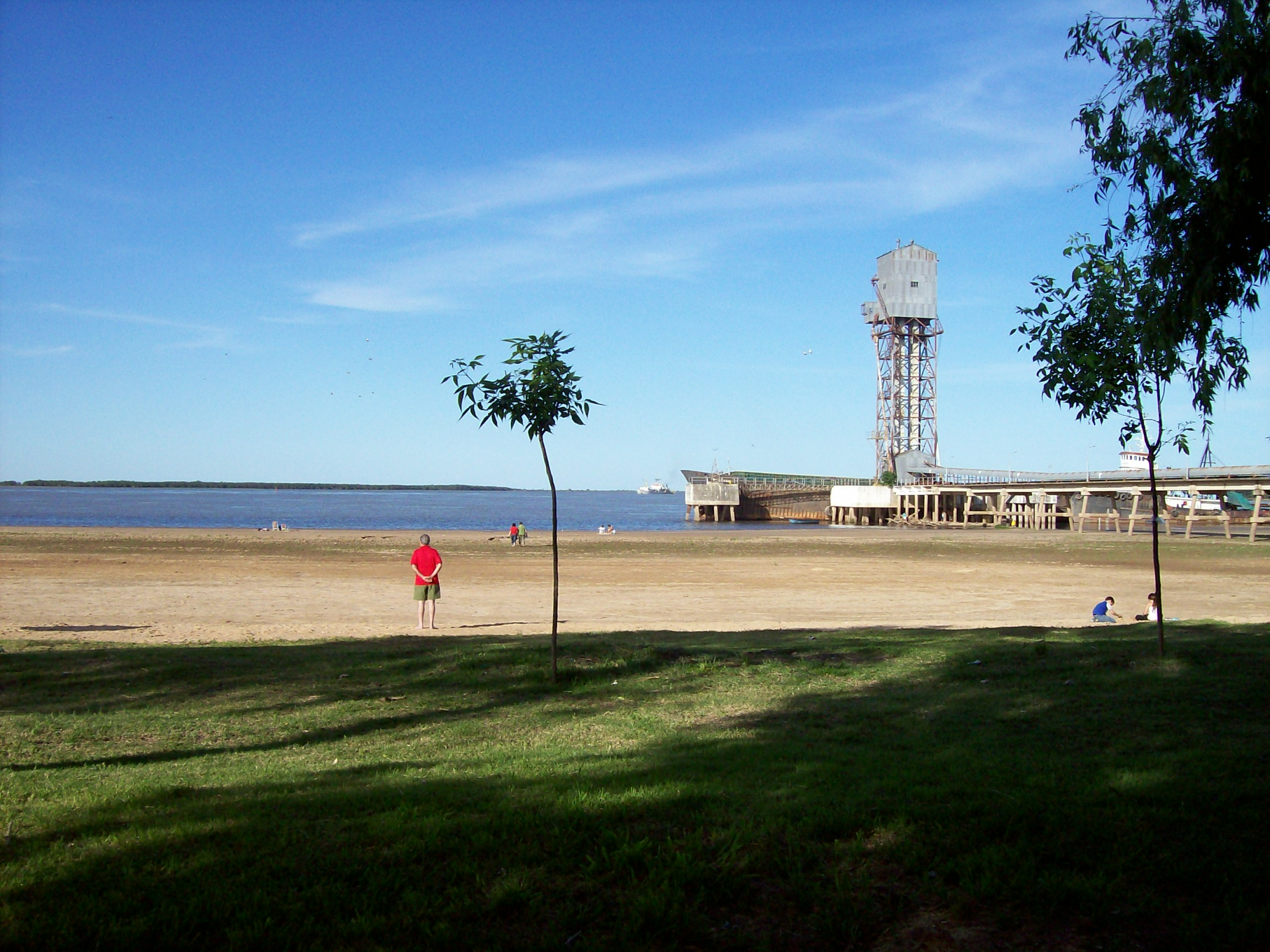
- Ramallo beach

- Location in Argentina Ramallo (Argentina)
- Coordinates: 33°19′S 60°12′W
- Country: Argentina
- Province: Buenos Aires
- Partido: Ramallo
- Founded: October 24, 1864
- Elevation: 37 m (121 ft)

Population (2001 census [INDEC])
  - Total: 11,428
- CPA Base: B 2915
- Area code: +54 3407

Ramallo is a town in Buenos Aires Province, Argentina. It is the administrative centre for Ramallo Partido. It is located on the Río Paraná.

== Economy ==
The city has an important port on the Paraná River. The main products of the region are agricultural goods, cattle feed and industrial crops. They include potato, citrus, soy, grains and vegetables. There is also a large stock breeding, pigs, sheep and horses community.

== Notable people ==
- Mateo Coronel, footballer
- Juan María Traverso, racing driver

== Gallery ==
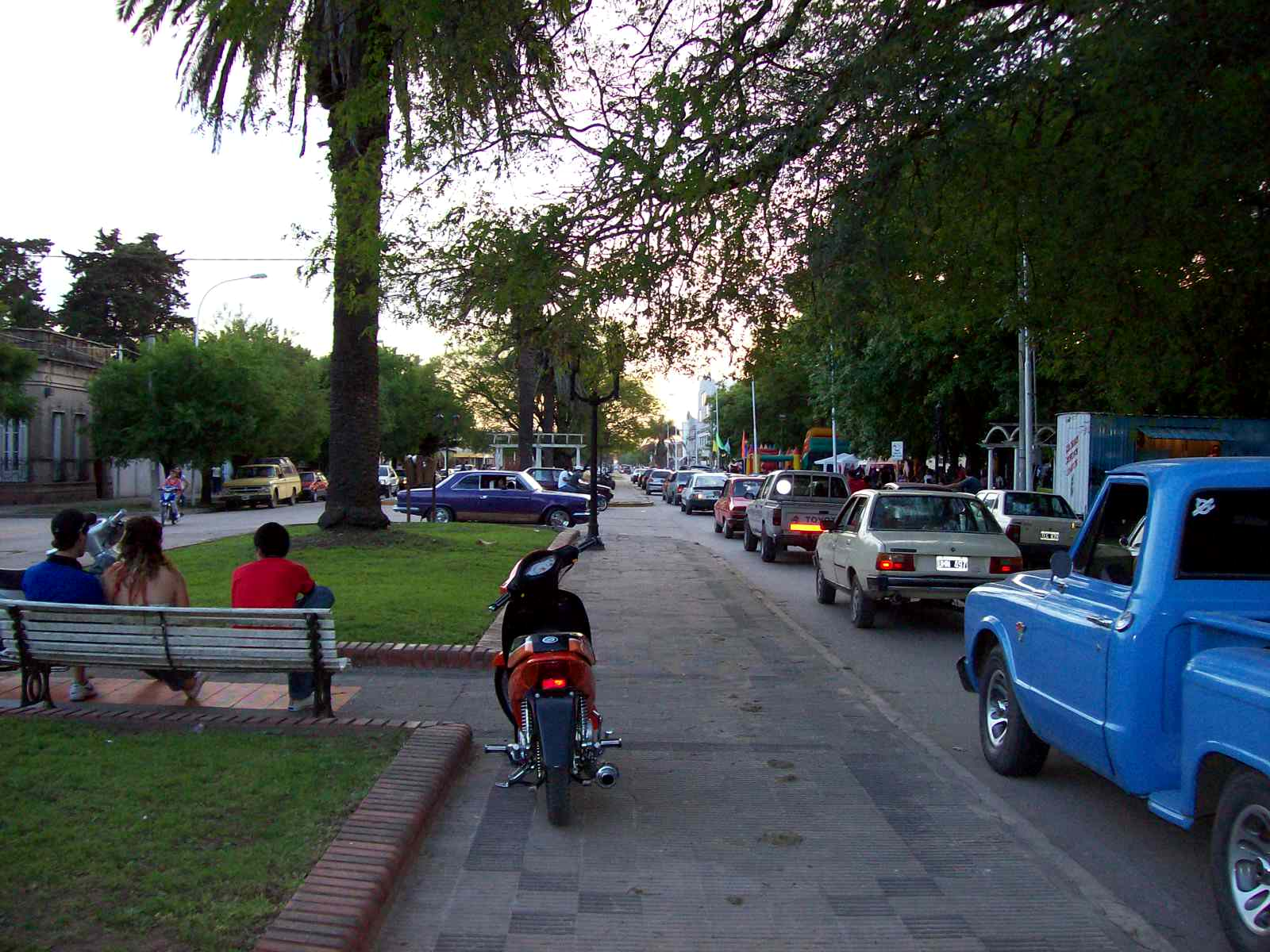
Ramallo centre]

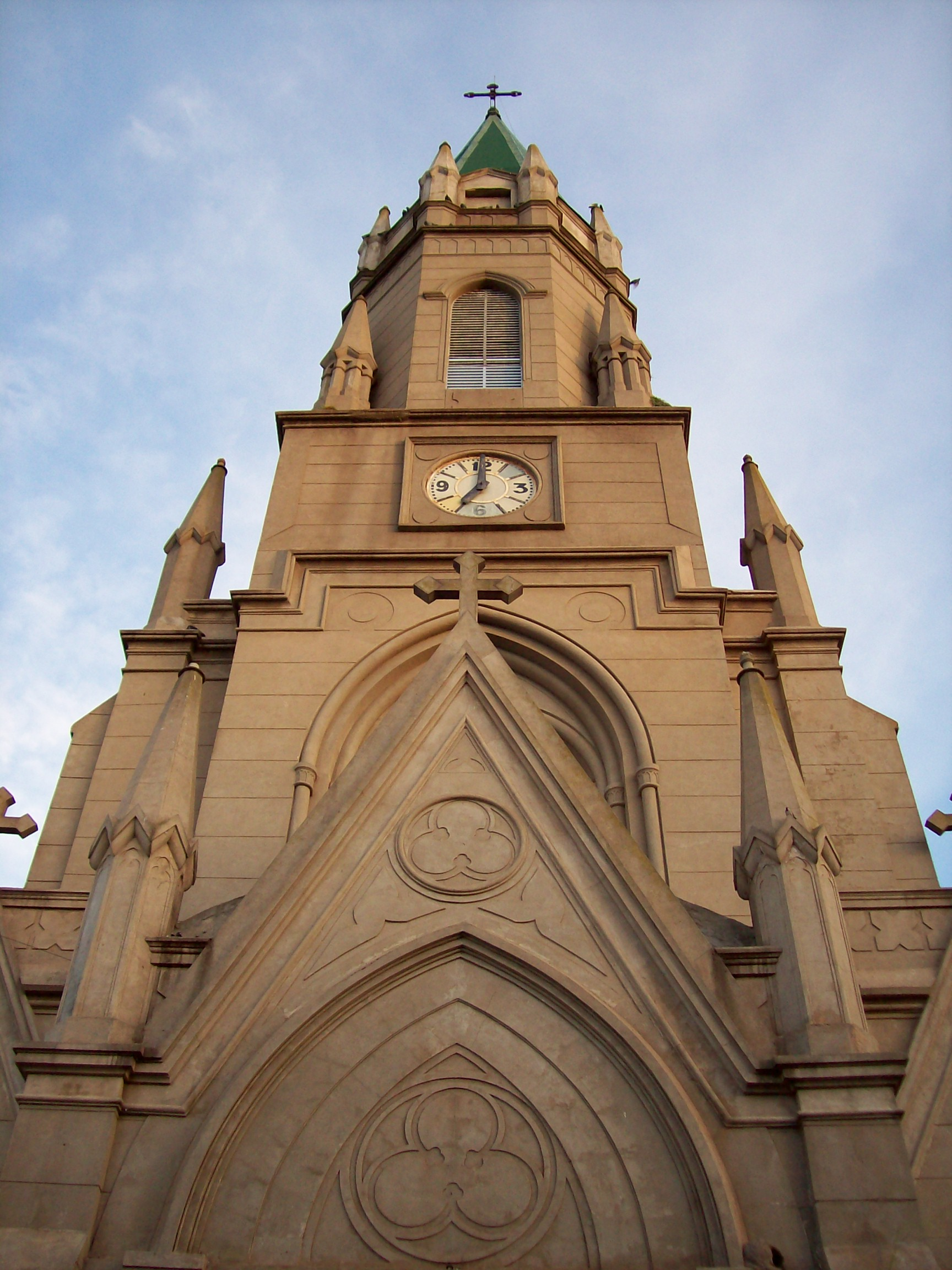
Parroquia San Francisco Javier

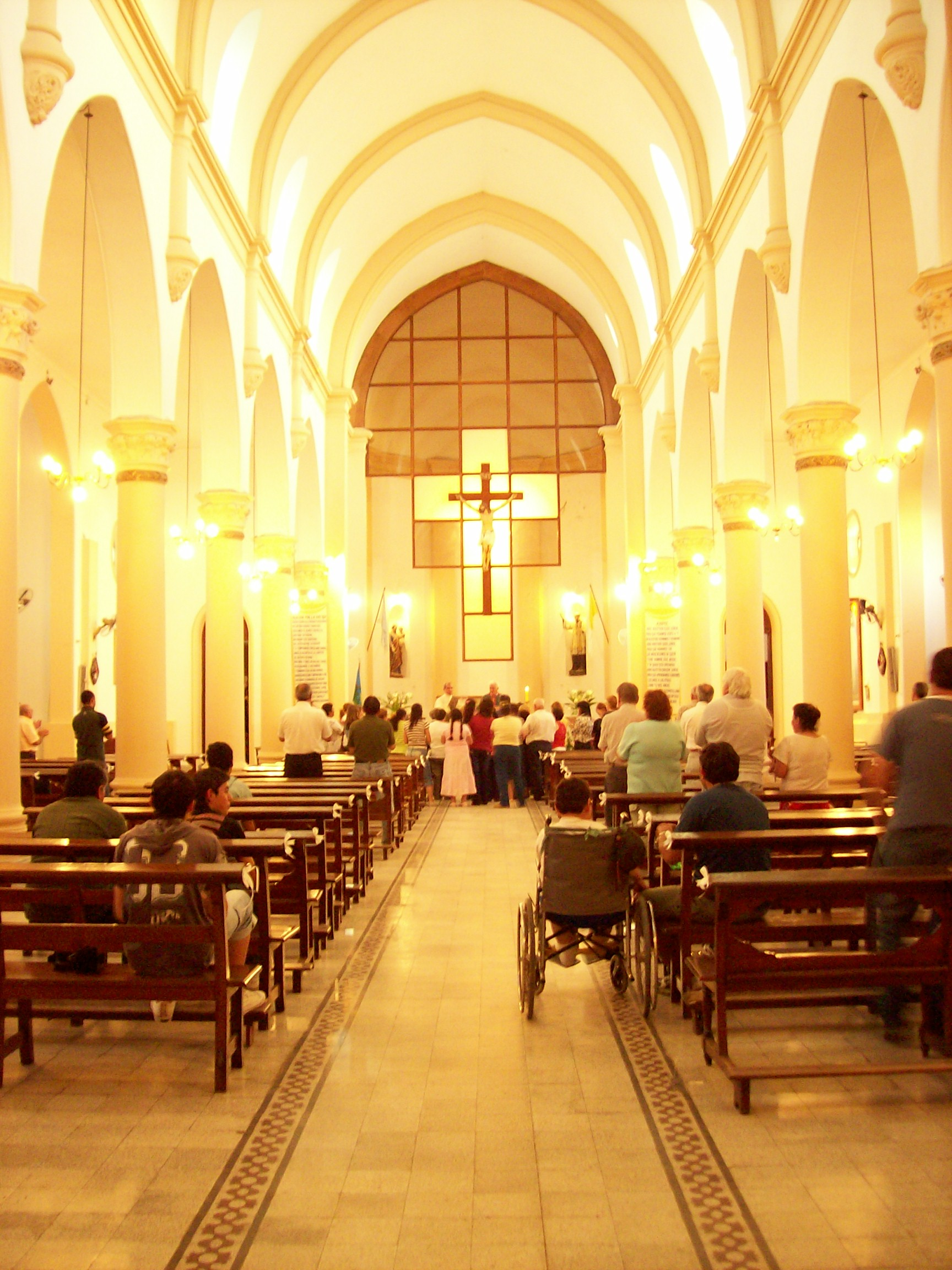
Interior of Parroquia
