= 2021 Copa Sudamericana first stage =

The 2021 Copa Sudamericana first stage was played from 16 March to 14 April 2021. A total of 32 teams competed in the first stage to decide 16 of the 32 places in the group stage of the 2021 Copa Sudamericana.

== Draw ==
The draw for the first stage was held on 5 February 2021, 12:00 PYST (UTC−3), at the CONMEBOL Convention Centre in Luque, Paraguay. For the first stage, the 32 teams involved were divided into eight pots according to their national association.

The 32 teams were drawn into 16 ties, with the four teams from each national association drawn against each other into two ties per association (e.g., the four teams from Bolivia were drawn into ties BOL 1 and BOL 2), and the first team drawn in each tie hosting the second leg.

First stage draw
| Bolivia (BOL) | Chile (CHI) | Colombia (COL) | Ecuador (ECU) |
|---|---|---|---|
| (Bolivia) Jorge Wilstermann; (Bolivia) Guabirá; (Bolivia) Nacional Potosí; (Bolivia) Atlético Palmaflor | (Chile) Palestino; (Chile) Deportes Antofagasta; (Chile) Cobresal; (Chile) Huachipato | (Colombia) Deportes Tolima; (Colombia) La Equidad; (Colombia) Deportivo Pasto; (Colombia) Deportivo Cali | (Ecuador) Emelec; (Ecuador) Guayaquil City; (Ecuador) Macará; (Ecuador) Aucas |
| Paraguay (PAR) | Peru (PER) | Uruguay (URU) | Venezuela (VEN) |
| (Paraguay) Nacional; (Paraguay) Guaireña; (Paraguay) 12 de Octubre; (Paraguay) River Plate | (Peru) Carlos A. Mannucci; (Peru) Sport Huancayo; (Peru) UTC; (Peru) Melgar | (Uruguay) Peñarol; (Uruguay) Montevideo City Torque; (Uruguay) Cerro Largo; (Uruguay) Fénix | (Venezuela) Academia Puerto Cabello; (Venezuela) Aragua; (Venezuela) Metropolitanos; (Venezuela) Mineros de Guayana |

Notes

1. ^{CHI} The identity of the teams Chile 1, Chile 2, Chile 3 and Chile 4 was not known at the time of the draw.
2. ^{URU} The identity of the teams Uruguay 1, Uruguay 2, Uruguay 3 and Uruguay 4 was not known at the time of the draw.

== Format ==
In the first stage, each tie was played on a home-and-away two-legged basis. If tied on aggregate, the away goals rule was used. If still tied, extra time will not be played, and a penalty shoot-out would be used to determine the winner (Regulations Article 2.4.2).

The 16 winners of the first stage advanced to the group stage to join the 12 teams directly qualified for that stage (six from Argentina and six from Brazil), and four teams transferred from the Copa Libertadores (the four teams eliminated in the third stage of qualifying).

== Matches ==
The first legs were played on 16–18 March, 6 and 7 April while the second legs were played on 6–8, 13 and 14 April 2021.

| Team 1 | Agg. | Team 2 | 1st leg | 2nd leg |
|---|---|---|---|---|
| Guabirá (Bolivia) | 6–2 | (Bolivia) Nacional Potosí | 4–1 | 2–1 |
| Jorge Wilstermann (Bolivia) | 4–2 | (Bolivia) Atlético Palmaflor | 2–1 | 2–1 |
| Deportes Antofagasta (Chile) | 0–4 | (Chile) Huachipato | 0–1 | 0–3 |
| Cobresal (Chile) | 1–2 | (Chile) Palestino | 0–0 | 1–2 |
| Deportes Tolima (Colombia) | 3–0 | (Colombia) Deportivo Cali | 3–0 | 0–0 |
| La Equidad (Colombia) | 3–2 | (Colombia) Deportivo Pasto | 1–2 | 2–0 |
| Macará (Ecuador) | 2–4 | (Ecuador) Emelec | 2–2 | 0–2 |
| Aucas (Ecuador) | 5–1 | (Ecuador) Guayaquil City | 2–1 | 3–0 |
| 12 de Octubre (Paraguay) | 0–0 (5–4 p) | (Paraguay) Nacional | 0–0 | 0–0 |
| Guaireña (Paraguay) | 3–6 | (Paraguay) River Plate | 1–2 | 2–4 |
| UTC (Peru) | 0–5 | (Peru) Sport Huancayo | 0–1 | 0–4 |
| Carlos A. Mannucci (Peru) | 3–5 | (Peru) Melgar | 1–2 | 2–3 |
| Montevideo City Torque (Uruguay) | 2–0 | (Uruguay) Fénix | 0–0 | 2–0 |
| Cerro Largo (Uruguay) | 3–6 | (Uruguay) Peñarol | 2–2 | 1–4 |
| Metropolitanos (Venezuela) | 3–0 | (Venezuela) Academia Puerto Cabello | 2–0 | 1–0 |
| Aragua (Venezuela) | 2–2 (a) | (Venezuela) Mineros de Guayana | 0–1 | 2–1 |

=== Match BOL 1 ===
17 March 2021
18:15 UTC−4

| Guabirá (Bolivia) | 4–1 | (Bolivia) Nacional Potosí |
|---|---|---|
| Hurtado 37'; Hoyos 74'; Peredo 76'; Vogliotti 90+3' | Report | Gularte 26' (pen.) |

Estadio Gilberto Parada, Montero
Attendance: 0
Referee: Luis Yrusta (Bolivia)

7 April 2021
18:15 UTC−4

| Nacional Potosí (Bolivia) | 1–2 | (Bolivia) Guabirá |
|---|---|---|
| R. Cuéllar 69' | Report | Mina 14'; Álvarez 82' |

Estadio Víctor Agustín Ugarte, Potosí
Attendance: 0
Referee: Gery Vargas (Bolivia)

Guabirá won 6–2 on aggregate and advanced to the group stage (BOL 1).

=== Match BOL 2 ===
17 March 2021
20:30 UTC−4

| Jorge Wilstermann (Bolivia) | 2–1 | (Bolivia) Atlético Palmaflor |
|---|---|---|
| Villarroel 7'; Osorio 38' | Report | Saldías 76' |

Estadio Félix Capriles, Cochabamba
Attendance: 0
Referee: Dilio Rodríguez (Bolivia) (Note: Referee Jordy Alemán from Bolivia, who was originally assigned to the Jorge Wilstermann v Atlético Palmaflor match, was replaced by his countryman Dilio Rodríguez.)

7 April 2021
20:30 UTC−4

| Atlético Palmaflor (Bolivia) | 1–2 | (Bolivia) Jorge Wilstermann |
|---|---|---|
| Blanco 4' | Report | Meleán 28'; Osorio 88' |

Estadio Félix Capriles, Cochabamba (Note: Atlético Palmaflor played their home match at Estadio Félix Capriles, Cochabamba instead of their regular stadium Estadio Municipal, Quillacollo, which did not meet CONMEBOL requirements.)
Attendance: 0
Referee: Juan Nelio García (Bolivia)

Jorge Wilstermann won 4–2 on aggregate and advanced to the group stage (BOL 2).

=== Match CHI 1 ===
16 March 2021
21:30 UTC−3

| Deportes Antofagasta (Chile) | 0–1 | (Chile) Huachipato |
|---|---|---|
| | Report | Sepúlveda 90+6' (pen.) |

Estadio Regional Calvo y Bascuñán, Antofagasta
Attendance: 0
Referee: Nicolás Gamboa (Chile)

6 April 2021
20:30 UTC−4

| Huachipato (Chile) | 3–0 | (Chile) Deportes Antofagasta |
|---|---|---|
| C. Martínez 9'; Mazzantti 67'; Silva 86' | Report |

Estadio CAP, Talcahuano
Attendance: 0
Referee: Piero Maza (Chile)

Huachipato won 4–0 on aggregate and advanced to the group stage (CHI 1).

=== Match CHI 2 ===
18 March 2021
21:30 UTC−3

| Cobresal (Chile) | 0–0 | (Chile) Palestino |
|---|---|---|
| | Report |

Estadio El Cobre, El Salvador
Attendance: 0
Referee: Felipe González (Chile)

8 April 2021
20:30 UTC−4

| Palestino (Chile) | 2–1 | (Chile) Cobresal |
|---|---|---|
| Carrasco 5'; Benítez 53' | Report | Pol 34' |

Estadio San Carlos de Apoquindo, Santiago (Note: Palestino played their home match at Estadio San Carlos de Apoquindo, Santiago instead of their regular stadium Estadio Municipal de La Cisterna, Santiago, which did not meet CONMEBOL requirements.)
Attendance: 0
Referee: Ángelo Hermosilla (Chile)

Palestino won 2–1 on aggregate and advanced to the group stage (CHI 2).

=== Match COL 1 ===
16 March 2021
19:30 UTC−5

| Deportes Tolima (Colombia) | 3–0 | (Colombia) Deportivo Cali |
|---|---|---|
| Miranda 9'; Mosquera 12' (pen.); Campaz 67' | Report |

Estadio Manuel Murillo Toro, Ibagué
Attendance: 0
Referee: Carlos Herrera (Colombia)

6 April 2021
19:30 UTC−5

| Deportivo Cali (Colombia) | 0–0 | (Colombia) Deportes Tolima |
|---|---|---|
| | Report |

Estadio Deportivo Cali, Palmira
Attendance: 0
Referee: Carlos Ortega (Colombia)

Deportes Tolima won 3–0 on aggregate and advanced to the group stage (COL 1).

=== Match COL 2 ===
18 March 2021
19:30 UTC−5

| La Equidad (Colombia) | 1–2 | (Colombia) Deportivo Pasto |
|---|---|---|
| Fuentes 10' | Report | García 36' (o.g.); Medina 66' |

Estadio El Campín, Bogotá (Note: La Equidad played their home match at Estadio El Campín, Bogotá instead of their regular stadium Estadio Metropolitano de Techo, Bogotá.)
Attendance: 0
Referee: Carlos Ortega (Colombia)

8 April 2021
19:30 UTC−5

| Deportivo Pasto (Colombia) | 0–2 | (Colombia) La Equidad |
|---|---|---|
| | Report | García 30'; Mena 37' |

Estadio Departamental Libertad, Pasto
Attendance: 0
Referee: Carlos Betancur (Colombia)

La Equidad won 3–2 on aggregate and advanced to the group stage (COL 2).

=== Match ECU 1 ===
16 March 2021
17:15 UTC−5

| Macará (Ecuador) | 2–2 | (Ecuador) Emelec |
|---|---|---|
| Orlando 26'; Santacruz 89' | Report | Barceló 20'; Zapata 34' |

Estadio Bellavista, Ambato
Attendance: 0
Referee: Augusto Aragón (Ecuador) (Note: Referee Roberto Sánchez from Ecuador, who was originally assigned to the Macará v Emelec match, was replaced by his countryman Augusto Aragón.)

6 April 2021
17:15 UTC−5

| Emelec (Ecuador) | 2–0 | (Ecuador) Macará |
|---|---|---|
| Barceló 5'; Cevallos 76' | Report |

Estadio George Capwell, Guayaquil
Attendance: 0
Referee: Franklin Congo (Ecuador)

Emelec won 4–2 on aggregate and advanced to the group stage (ECU 1).

=== Match ECU 2 ===
18 March 2021
17:15 UTC−5

| Aucas (Ecuador) | 2–1 | (Ecuador) Guayaquil City |
|---|---|---|
| Fydriszewski 37' (pen.), 90+3' | Report | Parrales 27' |

Estadio Gonzalo Pozo Ripalda, Quito
Attendance: 0
Referee: Alex Cajas (Ecuador)

8 April 2021
17:15 UTC−5

| Guayaquil City (Ecuador) | 0–3 | (Ecuador) Aucas |
|---|---|---|
| | Report | Fydriszewski 20'; Cano 22', 25' |

Estadio Christian Benítez Betancourt, Guayaquil
Attendance: 0
Referee: Luis Quiroz (Ecuador)

Aucas won 5–1 on aggregate and advanced to the group stage (ECU 2).

=== Match PAR 1 ===
16 March 2021
19:15 UTC−3

| 12 de Octubre (Paraguay) | 0–0 | (Paraguay) Nacional |
|---|---|---|
| | Report |

Estadio Luis Alfonso Giagni, Villa Elisa (Note: 12 de Octubre played their home match at Estadio Luis Alfonso Giagni, Villa Elisa instead of their regular stadium Estadio Luis Alberto Salinas, Itauguá.)
Attendance: 0
Referee: Mario Díaz de Vivar (Paraguay)

6 April 2021
18:15 UTC−4

| Nacional (Paraguay) | 0–0 | (Paraguay) 12 de Octubre |
|---|---|---|
| | Report |
Penalties
| Ayala (penalty scored); Clar (penalty missed); Riveros (penalty scored); Arrua (penalty scored); Rojas (penalty scored) | 4–5 | (penalty scored) Velázquez; (penalty scored) Aguilar; (penalty scored) Benítez; (penalty scored) Marabel; (penalty scored) Mendieta |

Estadio Defensores del Chaco, Asunción (Note: Nacional played their home match at Estadio Defensores del Chaco, Asunción (originally scheduled at Estadio General Pablo Rojas, Asunción) instead of their regular stadium Estadio Arsenio Erico, Asunción.)
Attendance: 0
Referee: Derlis López (Paraguay)

Tied 0–0 on aggregate, 12 de Octubre won on penalties and advanced to the group stage (PAR 1).

=== Match PAR 2 ===
18 March 2021
19:15 UTC−3

| Guaireña (Paraguay) | 1–2 | (Paraguay) River Plate |
|---|---|---|
| González 51' | Report | Zeballos 61'; Otazú 90' |

Estadio Defensores del Chaco, Asunción (Note: Guaireña played their home match at Estadio Defensores del Chaco, Asunción instead of their regular stadium Estadio Parque del Guairá, Villarrica.)
Attendance: 0
Referee: Éber Aquino (Paraguay)

8 April 2021
18:15 UTC−4

| River Plate (Paraguay) | 4–2 | (Paraguay) Guaireña |
|---|---|---|
| Zeballos 15' (pen.); González 19'; Godoy 36'; Caballero 85' | Report | Brizuela 41'; Verdún 87' |

Estadio Defensores del Chaco, Asunción (Note: River Plate played their home match at Estadio Defensores del Chaco, Asunción instead of their regular stadium Estadio River Plate, Asunción which did not meet CONMEBOL requirements.)
Attendance: 0
Referee: Mario Díaz de Vivar (Paraguay)

River Plate won 6–3 on aggregate and advanced to the group stage (PAR 2).

=== Match PER 1 ===
17 March 2021
19:30 UTC−5

| UTC (Peru) | 0–1 | (Peru) Sport Huancayo |
|---|---|---|
| | Report | Balta 74' |

Estadio Monumental, Lima (Note: UTC played their home match at Estadio Monumental, Lima (originally scheduled at Estadio Garcilaso, Cusco) instead of their regular stadium Estadio Héroes de San Ramón, Cajamarca which did not meet CONMEBOL requirements.)
Attendance: 0
Referee: Augusto Menéndez (Peru)

7 April 2021
19:30 UTC−5

| Sport Huancayo (Peru) | 4–0 | (Peru) UTC |
|---|---|---|
| Liliu 4'; Barreto 30'; Quintero 84'; Valverde 90+4' (pen.) | Report |

Estadio Nacional, Lima (Note: Sport Huancayo played their home match at Estadio Nacional, Lima instead of their regular stadium Estadio Huancayo, Huancayo.)
Attendance: 0
Referee: Diego Haro (Peru)

Sport Huancayo won 5–0 on aggregate and advanced to the group stage (PER 1).

=== Match PER 2 ===
18 March 2021
19:30 UTC−5

| Carlos A. Mannucci (Peru) | 1–2 | (Peru) Melgar |
|---|---|---|
| J. Fernández 90+3' | Report | Bordacahar 11', 40' |

Estadio Monumental, Lima (Note: Carlos A. Mannucci played their home match at Estadio Monumental, Lima instead of their regular stadium Estadio Mansiche, Trujillo.)
Attendance: 0
Referee: Edwin Ordóñez (Peru)

8 April 2021
19:30 UTC−5

| Melgar (Peru) | 3–2 | (Peru) Carlos A. Mannucci |
|---|---|---|
| Arias 8'; Iberico 35'; Cuesta 61' (pen.) | Report | Mifflin 15' (o.g.); J. Fernández 76' |

Estadio Nacional, Lima (Note: Melgar played their home match at Estadio Nacional, Lima instead of their regular stadium Estadio Monumental de la UNSA, Arequipa.)
Attendance: 0
Referee: Michael Espinoza (Peru)

Melgar won 5–3 on aggregate and advanced to the group stage (PER 2).

=== Match URU 1 ===
7 April 2021
19:15 UTC−3

| Montevideo City Torque (Uruguay) | 0–0 | (Uruguay) Fénix |
|---|---|---|
| | Report |

Estadio Centenario, Montevideo
Attendance: 0
Referee: Daniel Fedorczuk (Uruguay)

14 April 2021
19:15 UTC−3

| Fénix (Uruguay) | 0–2 | (Uruguay) Montevideo City Torque |
|---|---|---|
| | Report | Del Prete 19'; Catarozzi 86' |

Parque Alfredo Víctor Viera, Montevideo (Note: Fénix played their home match at Parque Alfredo Víctor Viera, Montevideo instead of their regular stadium Estadio Parque Capurro, Montevideo which did not meet CONMEBOL requirements.)
Attendance: 0
Referee: Christian Ferreyra (Uruguay)

Montevideo City Torque won 2–0 on aggregate and advanced to the group stage (URU 1).

=== Match URU 2 ===
6 April 2021
21:30 UTC−3

| Cerro Largo (Uruguay) | 2–2 | (Uruguay) Peñarol |
|---|---|---|
| Estol 72' (pen.); Borges 90+5' | Report | Formiliano 21'; Terans 50' |

Parque Alfredo Víctor Viera, Montevideo (Note: Cerro Largo played their home match at Parque Alfredo Víctor Viera, Montevideo instead of their regular stadium Estadio Arquitecto Antonio Eleuterio Ubilla, Melo which did not meet CONMEBOL requirements.)
Attendance: 0
Referee: Diego Riveiro (Uruguay)

13 April 2021
21:30 UTC−3

| Peñarol (Uruguay) | 4–1 | (Uruguay) Cerro Largo |
|---|---|---|
| Álvarez Martínez 4', 43'; Torres 30'; Ferreira 60' (o.g.) | Report | Estol 20' |

Estadio Campeón del Siglo, Montevideo
Attendance: 0
Referee: Andrés Cunha (Uruguay)

Peñarol won 6–3 on aggregate and advanced to the group stage (URU 2).

=== Match VEN 1 ===
18 March 2021
18:15 UTC−4

| Metropolitanos (Venezuela) | 2–0 | (Venezuela) Academia Puerto Cabello |
|---|---|---|
| Larotonda 39'; Flores 56' | Report |

Estadio Olímpico de la UCV, Caracas
Attendance: 0
Referee: Yender Herrera (Venezuela)

8 April 2021
18:15 UTC−4

| Academia Puerto Cabello (Venezuela) | 0–1 | (Venezuela) Metropolitanos |
|---|---|---|
| | Report | Bustillo 28' |

Estadio Misael Delgado, Valencia (Note: Academia Puerto Cabello played their home match at Estadio Misael Delgado, Valencia instead of their regular stadium Complejo Deportivo Socialista, Puerto Cabello.)
Attendance: 0
Referee: José Argote (Venezuela)

Metropolitanos won 3–0 on aggregate and advanced to the group stage (VEN 1).

=== Match VEN 2 ===
17 March 2021
20:30 UTC−4

| Aragua (Venezuela) | 0–1 | (Venezuela) Mineros |
|---|---|---|
| | Report | Alcócer 81' |

Estadio Olímpico de la UCV, Caracas (Note: Aragua played their home match at Estadio Olímpico de la UCV, Caracas instead of their regular stadium Estadio Olímpico Hermanos Ghersi Páez, Maracay.)
Attendance: 0
Referee: Orlando Bracamonte (Venezuela)

7 April 2021
18:15 UTC−4

| Mineros (Venezuela) | 1–2 | (Venezuela) Aragua |
|---|---|---|
| Valderrey 8' | Report | Rivillo 36'; Stephens 45' |

Estadio Olímpico de la UCV, Caracas (Note: Mineros played their home match at Estadio Olímpico de la UCV, Caracas instead of their regular stadium Polideportivo Cachamay, Ciudad Guayana.)
Attendance: 0
Referee: Andrés Pernía (Venezuela)

Tied 2–2 on aggregate, Aragua won on away goals and advanced to the group stage (VEN 2).
