= 2021 Copa Sudamericana final =

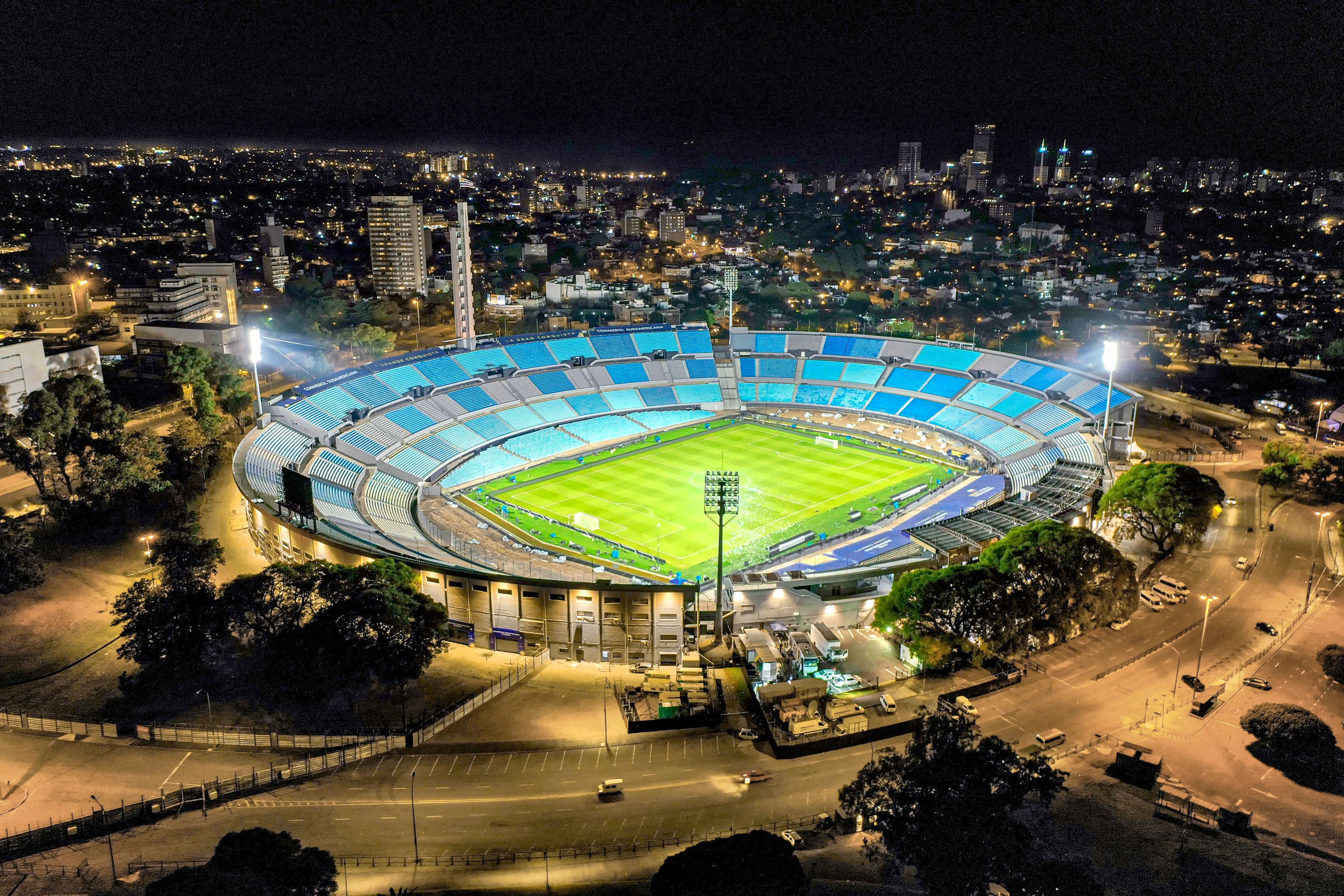
- The Estadio Centenario in Montevideo hosted the final.
- Event: 2021 Copa Sudamericana
Athletico Paranaense	Red Bull Bragantino
(Brazil)	(Brazil)
1	0
- Date: 20 November 2021
- Venue: Estadio Centenario, Montevideo
- Man of the Match: Nikão (Athletico Paranaense)
- Referee: Andrés Matonte (Uruguay)
- Attendance: 20,000

The 2021 Copa Sudamericana final was the final match which decided the winner of the 2021 Copa Sudamericana. This was the 20th edition of the Copa Sudamericana, the second-tier South American continental club football tournament organized by CONMEBOL.

The match was played on 20 November 2021 at the Estadio Centenario in Montevideo, Uruguay, between Brazilian sides Athletico Paranaense and Red Bull Bragantino.

On 13 May 2021, CONMEBOL announced that the final would be played at the Estadio Centenario in Montevideo, Uruguay on 6 November 2021.

Athletico Paranaense defeated Red Bull Bragantino by a 1–0 score in the final to win their second title in the tournament. As winners of the 2021 Copa Sudamericana, they earned the right to play against the winners of the 2021 Copa Libertadores in the 2022 Recopa Sudamericana. They also automatically qualified for the 2022 Copa Libertadores group stage.

As of 2025, this is the only Copa Sudamericana final where both teams represented Brazil.

== Venue ==
Candidate Venues for the 2021 Copa Sudamericana final
Association	Stadium	City	Capacity
Argentina	Estadio Presidente Juan Domingo Perón	Avellaneda	61,000
Argentina	Estadio Libertadores de América	Avellaneda	48,069
Argentina	Estadio Monumental Antonio V. Liberti	Buenos Aires	70,074
Argentina	La Bombonera	Buenos Aires	54,000
Argentina	Estadio Pedro Bidegain	Buenos Aires	47,964
Argentina	Estadio Único	Santiago del Estero	57,000
Brazil	Estádio Nacional Mané Garrincha	Brasília	69,432
Brazil	Arena da Baixada	Curitiba	42,372
Brazil	Castelão	Fortaleza	60,348
Brazil	Estádio Beira-Rio	Porto Alegre	50,128
Brazil	Arena Pernambuco	Recife	42,583
Brazil	Maracanã	Rio de Janeiro	74,738
Brazil	Arena Fonte Nova	Salvador	51,708
Chile	Estadio Nacional Julio Martínez Prádanos	Santiago	58,665
Ecuador	Estadio Rodrigo Paz Delgado	Quito	41,575
Uruguay	Estadio Centenario	Montevideo	60,235

On 13 May 2021, CONMEBOL announced that Estadio Centenario, Montevideo was chosen as the 2021 final venue.

== Road to the final ==
Note: In all scores below, the score of the home team is given first.

(Brazil) Athletico Paranaense			Round	(Brazil) Red Bull Bragantino		
Opponent	Venue	Score		Opponent	Venue	Score
Bye			First stage	Bye		
Group D			Group stage	Group G		
(Ecuador) Aucas	Away	0–1	Group stage	(Colombia) Deportes Tolima	Home	2–1
(Venezuela) Metropolitanos	Home	1–0	Group stage	(Ecuador) Emelec	Away	3–0
(Peru) Melgar	Away	1–0	Group stage	(Argentina) Talleres	Home	0–1
(Ecuador) Metropolitanos	Away	0–1	Group stage	(Ecuador) Emelec	Home	2–0
(Peru) Melgar	Home	1–0	Group stage	(Argentina) Talleres	Away	0–1
(Ecuador) Aucas	Home	4–0	Group stage	(Colombia) Deportes Tolima	Away	1–2
Pos / Team / Pld / Pts; 1 / (Brazil) Athletico Paranaense / 6 / 15; 2 / (Peru) Melgar / 6 / 10; 3 / (Ecuador) Aucas / 6 / 6; 4 / (Venezuela) Metropolitanos / 6 / 4; Source: CONMEBOL			Group stage	Pos / Team / Pld / Pts; 1 / (Brazil) Red Bull Bragantino / 6 / 12; 2 / (Ecuador) Emelec / 6 / 10; 3 / (Argentina) Talleres / 6 / 8; 4 / (Colombia) Deportes Tolima / 6 / 3; Source: CONMEBOL		
Seed 2			Final stages	Seed 6		
(Colombia) América de Cali (won 5–1 on aggregate)	Away	0–1	Round of 16	(Ecuador) Independiente del Valle (won 3–1 on aggregate)	Away	0–2
(Colombia) América de Cali (won 5–1 on aggregate)	Home	4–1	Round of 16	(Ecuador) Independiente del Valle (won 3–1 on aggregate)	Home	1–1
(Ecuador) LDU Quito (won 4–3 on aggregate)	Away	1–0	Quarter-finals	(Argentina) Rosario Central (won 5–3 on aggregate)	Away	3–4
(Ecuador) LDU Quito (won 4–3 on aggregate)	Home	4–2	Quarter-finals	(Argentina) Rosario Central (won 5–3 on aggregate)	Home	1–0
(Uruguay) Peñarol (won 4–1 on aggregate)	Away	1–2	Semi-finals	(Paraguay) Libertad (won 5–1 on aggregate)	Home	2–0
(Uruguay) Peñarol (won 4–1 on aggregate)	Home	2–0	Semi-finals	(Paraguay) Libertad (won 5–1 on aggregate)	Away	1–3

== Match ==
=== Details ===
20 November 2021
17:00 UTC−3

Athletico Paranaense (Brazil)	1–0	(Brazil) Red Bull Bragantino
Nikão 29'	Report

Estadio Centenario, Montevideo
Attendance: 20,000
Referee: Andrés Matonte (Uruguay)

Athletico Paranaense	Red Bull Bragantino

GK	1	(Brazil) Santos
RCB	34	(Brazil) Pedro Henrique
CB	44	(Brazil) Thiago Heleno (c)
LCB	22	(Colombia) Nicolás Hernández		(substituted off) 75'
RM	5	(Brazil) Marcinho
RDM	26	(Brazil) Erick	(yellow card) 64'	(substituted off) 82'
LDM	18	(Brazil) Léo Cittadini	(yellow card) 38'	(substituted off) 90+5'
LM	16	(Brazil) Abner Vinícius	(yellow card) 45'
RW	11	(Brazil) Nikão
LW	20	(Uruguay) David Terans		(substituted off) 75'
CF	9	(Brazil) Renato Kayzer		(substituted off) 75'
Substitutes:
GK	24	(Brazil) Bento
DF	6	(Brazil) Márcio Azevedo
DF	13	(Brazil) Khellven
DF	27	(Brazil) Zé Ivaldo		(substituted on) 75'
DF	30	(Brazil) Nicolas		(substituted on) 90+5'
DF	38	(Brazil) Lucas Fasson
DF	48	(Brazil) Pedrinho
MF	8	(Brazil) Fernando Canesin		(substituted on) 82'
MF	39	(Brazil) Christian		(substituted on) 75'
FW	15	(Brazil) Jader
FW	28	(Brazil) Pedro Rocha		(substituted on) 75'
FW	37	(Brazil) Bissoli
Manager:
(Brazil) Alberto Valentim

GK	18	(Brazil) Cleiton
RB	13	(Brazil) Aderlan	(yellow card) 73'
RCB	14	(Brazil) Fabrício Bruno	(yellow card) 16'
LCB	3	(Brazil) Léo Ortiz (c)
LB	6	(Brazil) Edimar		(substituted off) 77'
CDM	5	(Brazil) Jadsom
RCM	25	(Brazil) Bruno Praxedes		(substituted off) 82'
LCM	28	(Argentina) Tomás Cuello		(substituted off) 82'
RW	7	(Brazil) Artur		(substituted off) 88'
LW	11	(Brazil) Helinho
CF	15	(Brazil) Ytalo		(substituted off) 88'
Substitutes:
GK	1	(Brazil) Júlio César
DF	17	(Brazil) Weverton
DF	21	(Brazil) Natan
DF	29	(Brazil) Luan Cândido		(substituted on) 77'
DF	31	(Brazil) Guilherme Lopes
MF	23	(Brazil) Cristiano
FW	9	(Brazil) Alerrandro		(substituted on) 82'
FW	19	(Brazil) Bruno Gonçalves
FW	22	(Brazil) Leandrinho		(substituted on) 88'
FW	27	(Venezuela) Jan Carlos Hurtado		(substituted on) 88'
FW	33	(Brazil) Pedrinho
FW	34	(Brazil) Gabriel Novaes		(substituted on) 82'
Manager:
(Brazil) Maurício Barbieri

Man of the Match:
Nikão (Athletico Paranaense)

Assistant referees:
Martín Soppi (Uruguay)
Carlos Barreiro (Uruguay)
Fourth official:
Christian Ferreyra (Uruguay)
Fifth official:
Andrés Nievas (Uruguay)
Video assistant referee:
Leodán González (Uruguay)
Assistant video assistant referees:
Víctor Carrillo (Peru)
Nicolás Tarán (Uruguay)
Juan Soto (Venezuela)

Match rules

- 90 minutes.
- 30 minutes of extra time if necessary.
- Penalty shoot-out if scores still level.
- Twelve named substitutes.
- Maximum of five substitutions.

== See also ==
- 2021 Copa Libertadores final
- 2022 Recopa Sudamericana
