= 2021 in Ecuadorian football =

Football in Ecuador
- Season: 2021

The 2021 season in Ecuadorian football includes all the matches of the different national male and female teams, as well as the local club tournaments, and the participation of these in international competitions in which representatives of the country's teams will participate.

== National teams ==
=== Ecuador national football team ===
==== Kits ====
Home

==== Friendly matches ====
29 March Friendly	Ecuador	2 – 1	Bolivia	Guayaquil, Ecuador
16:00 UTC−5	Martínez 37'; Estrada 59'	Report	Ramallo 90+4'	Stadium: Estadio Monumental Banco Pichincha; Referee: John Alexander Ospina (Colombia)

==== 2022 FIFA World Cup qualification ====
TBD 2022 FIFA World Cup qualification	Venezuela	v	Ecuador	Caracas, Venezuela
		Report		Stadium: Estadio Olímpico de la UCV

TBD 2022 FIFA World Cup qualification	Ecuador	v	Chile	Quito, Ecuador
		Report		Stadium: Estadio Rodrigo Paz Delgado

4 June 2022 FIFA World Cup qualification	Brazil	2 – 0	Ecuador	Porto Alegre, Brazil
21:30 UTC−3	Richarlison 65'; Neymar 90+4' (pen.)	Report		Stadium: Estádio Beira-Rio; Attendance: 0 Referee: Alexis Herrera (Venezuela)

8 June 2022 FIFA World Cup qualification	Ecuador	1 – 2	Peru	Quito, Ecuador
17:00 UTC−5	Plata 90+3'	Report	Cueva 63'; Advíncula 89'	Stadium: Estadio Rodrigo Paz Delgado; Attendance: 0 Referee: Esteban Ostojich (Uruguay)

2 September 2022 FIFA World Cup qualification	Ecuador	v	Paraguay	Ecuador

7 September 2022 FIFA World Cup qualification	Uruguay	v	Ecuador	Montevideo, Uruguay
				Stadium: Estadio Centenario

7 October 2022 FIFA World Cup qualification	Ecuador	v	Bolivia	Ecuador

12 October 2022 FIFA World Cup qualification	Colombia	v	Ecuador	Colombia

11 November 2022 FIFA World Cup qualification	Ecuador	v	Venezuela	Ecuador

16 November 2022 FIFA World Cup qualification	Chile	v	Ecuador	Santiago, Chile
				Stadium: Estadio Nacional

==== 2021 Copa América ====
===== Group B =====
Pos	Team	Pld	W	D	L	GF	GA	GD	Pts	Qualification
1	Brazil (H)	4	3	1	0	10	2	+8	10	Advance to knockout stage
2	Peru	4	2	1	1	5	7	−2	7	Advance to knockout stage
3	Colombia	4	1	1	2	3	4	−1	4	Advance to knockout stage
4	Ecuador	4	0	3	1	5	6	−1	3	Advance to knockout stage
5	Venezuela	4	0	2	2	2	6	−4	2	

Source: CONMEBOL
(H) Hosts

13 June 2021 Copa América	Colombia	1 – 0	Ecuador	Cuiabá
20:00 UTC−4	Cardona 42'	Report		Stadium: Arena Pantanal; Attendance: 0 Referee: Néstor Pitana (Argentina)

20 June 2021 2021 Copa América	Venezuela	2 – 2	Ecuador	Rio de Janeiro
18:00 UTC−3	Castillo 51'; Hernández 90+1'	Report	Ay. Preciado 39'; Plata 71'	Stadium: Estádio Olímpico Nilton Santos; Attendance: 0 Referee: Roberto Tobar (Chile)

23 June 2021 Copa América	Ecuador	2 – 2	Peru	Goiânia
18:00 UTC−3	Tapia 23' (o.g.); Ay. Preciado 45+3'	Report	Lapadula 49'; Carrillo 54'	Stadium: Estádio Olímpico Pedro Ludovico; Attendance: 0 Referee: Jesús Gil Manzano (Spain)

27 June 2021 2021 Copa América	Brazil	1 – 1	Ecuador	Goiânia
18:00	Militão 37'	Report	Mena 53'	Stadium: Estádio Olímpico Pedro Ludovico; Attendance: 0 Referee: Roberto Tobar (Chile)

===== Knockout stage =====
3 July 2021 Quarter-finals	Argentina	Match 24	Ecuador	Estádio Olímpico Pedro Ludovico, Goiânia
22:00

== CONMEBOL competitions ==
=== CONMEBOL Copa Libertadores ===
==== Qualifying stages ====
===== First qualifying stage =====
Team 1	Agg.	Team 2	1st leg	2nd leg
Liverpool (Uruguay)	2–4	(Ecuador) Universidad Católica	2–1	0–3

===== Second qualifying stage =====
Team 1	Agg.	Team 2	1st leg	2nd leg
Universidad Católica (Ecuador)	2–3	(Paraguay) Libertad	0–1	2–2
Unión Española (Chile)	3–6	(Ecuador) Independiente del Valle	1–0	2–6

===== Third qualifying stage =====
Team 1	Agg.	Team 2	1st leg	2nd leg
Independiente del Valle (Ecuador)	4–2	(Brazil) Grêmio	2–1	2–1

==== Group stage ====
===== Group A =====
Pos	Team	Pld	W	D	L	GF	GA	GD	Pts	Qualification	PAL	DYJ	IDV	UNI
1	(Brazil) Palmeiras	6	5	0	1	20	7	+13	15	Round of 16	—	3–4	5–0	6–0
2	(Argentina) Defensa y Justicia	6	2	3	1	11	8	+3	9	Round of 16	1–2	—	1–1	3–0
3	(Ecuador) Independiente del Valle	6	1	2	3	8	11	−3	5	Copa Sudamericana	0–1	1–1	—	4–0
4	(Peru) Universitario	6	1	1	4	6	19	−13	4		2–3	1–1	3–2	—

Source: CONMEBOL

===== Group C =====
Pos	Team	Pld	W	D	L	GF	GA	GD	Pts	Qualification	BSC	BOC	SAN	STR
1	(Ecuador) Barcelona	6	4	1	1	10	3	+7	13	Round of 16	—	1–0	3–1	4–0
2	(Argentina) Boca Juniors	6	3	1	2	6	2	+4	10	Round of 16	0–0	—	2–0	3–0
3	(Brazil) Santos	6	2	0	4	8	9	−1	6	Copa Sudamericana	0–2	1–0	—	5–0
4	(Bolivia) The Strongest	6	2	0	4	4	14	−10	6		2–0	0–1	2–1	—

Source: CONMEBOL

===== Group G =====
Pos	Team	Pld	W	D	L	GF	GA	GD	Pts	Qualification	FLA	VEL	LDQ	ULC
1	(Brazil) Flamengo	6	3	3	0	14	9	+5	12	Round of 16	—	0–0	2–2	4–1
2	(Argentina) Vélez Sarsfield	6	3	1	2	10	8	+2	10	Round of 16	2–3	—	3–1	2–1
3	(Ecuador) LDU Quito	6	2	2	2	15	13	+2	8	Copa Sudamericana	2–3	3–1	—	5–2
4	(Chile) Unión La Calera	6	0	2	4	8	17	−9	2		2–2	0–2	2–2	—

Source: CONMEBOL

==== Knockout phase ====
===== Round of 16 =====
Team 1	Agg.	Team 2	1st leg	2nd leg
Vélez Sarsfield (Argentina)	2–3	(Ecuador) Barcelona	1–0	1–3

===== Quarter-finals =====
Team 1	Agg.	Team 2	1st leg	2nd leg
Winner D	S4	(Ecuador) Barcelona	10–12 Aug	17–19 Aug

=== CONMEBOL Copa Sudamericana ===
==== First stage ====
Team 1	Agg.	Team 2	1st leg	2nd leg
Macará (Ecuador)	2–4	(Ecuador) Emelec	2–2	0–2
Aucas (Ecuador)	5–1	(Ecuador) Guayaquil City	2–1	3–0

==== Group stage ====
===== Group D =====
Pos	Team	Pld	W	D	L	GF	GA	GD	Pts	Qualification	CAP	MEL	AUC	MET
1	(Brazil) Athletico Paranaense	6	5	0	1	8	1	+7	15	Round of 16	—	1–0	4–0	1–0
2	(Peru) Melgar	6	3	1	2	7	5	+2	10		1–0	—	2–0	0–0
3	(Ecuador) Aucas	6	2	0	4	7	11	−4	6		0–1	2–1	—	3–0
4	(Venezuela) Metropolitanos	6	1	1	4	5	10	−5	4		0–1	2–3	3–2	—

Source: CONMEBOL

===== Group G =====
Pos	Team	Pld	W	D	L	GF	GA	GD	Pts	Qualification	RBB	EME	TAL	TOL
1	(Brazil) Red Bull Bragantino	6	4	0	2	7	6	+1	12	Round of 16	—	2–0	0–1	2–1
2	(Ecuador) Emelec	6	3	1	2	9	8	+1	10		3–0	—	1–4	2–0
3	(Argentina) Talleres	6	2	2	2	7	5	+2	8		0–1	1–2	—	0–0
4	(Colombia) Deportes Tolima	6	0	3	3	4	8	−4	3		1–2	1–1	1–1	—

Source: CONMEBOL

==== Final phase ====
===== Round of 16 =====
Team 1	Agg.	Team 2	1st leg	2nd leg
Independiente del Valle (Ecuador)	B	(Brazil) Red Bull Bragantino	14 Jul	21 Jul
LDU Quito (Ecuador)	E	(Brazil) Grêmio	13 Jul	20 Jul

== Men's football ==
=== League season ===
League	Promoted to league	Relegated from league
Serie A	9 de Octubre; Manta	LDU Portoviejo; El Nacional
Serie B	Guayaquil Sport; Cumbayá	Fuerza Amarilla; Santa Rita
Segunda Categoría	—N/a	—N/a

==== Serie A ====
First stage

Pos	Team	Pld	W	D	L	GF	GA	GD	Pts	Qualification
1	Emelec	15	10	4	1	29	14	+15	34	Advance to Finals and qualification for Copa Libertadores group stage
2	Barcelona	15	9	4	2	31	13	+18	31	
3	Independiente del Valle	15	8	3	4	27	18	+9	27	
4	Universidad Católica	15	7	4	4	29	18	+11	25	
5	Mushuc Runa	15	7	4	4	29	21	+8	25	
6	LDU Quito	15	6	7	2	22	19	+3	25	
7	Macará	15	6	5	4	17	17	0	23	
8	9 de Octubre	15	6	2	7	22	21	+1	20	
9	Aucas	15	5	4	6	27	26	+1	19	
10	Delfín	15	4	6	5	19	25	−6	18	
11	Deportivo Cuenca	15	4	4	7	14	18	−4	16	
12	Manta	15	4	4	7	18	25	−7	16	
13	Técnico Universitario	15	3	4	8	11	17	−6	13	
14	Orense	15	3	3	9	14	24	−10	12	
15	Guayaquil City	15	2	4	9	11	30	−19	10	
16	Olmedo (Note: Olmedo were deducted three points as punishment for failing to pay their creditors.)	15	2	6	7	13	27	−14	9	

Source: LigaPro, Soccerway
Rules for classification: 1) Points, 2) Goal difference, 3) Goals for, 4) Away goals for, 5) Head-to-head record, 6) Drawing of lots.
Notes:

Second stage

Pos	Team	Pld	W	D	L	GF	GA	GD	Pts	Qualification
1	Independiente del Valle	15	10	4	1	29	9	+20	34	Advance to Finals and qualification for Copa Libertadores group stage
2	Emelec	15	9	3	3	30	15	+15	30	
3	9 de Octubre	15	9	3	3	25	17	+8	30	
4	Universidad Católica	15	8	5	2	25	15	+10	29	
5	LDU Quito	15	6	5	4	27	22	+5	23	
6	Delfín	15	6	4	5	25	20	+5	22	
7	Técnico Universitario	15	5	7	3	13	9	+4	22	
8	Aucas	15	5	5	5	20	17	+3	20	
9	Barcelona	15	6	2	7	20	20	0	20	
10	Guayaquil City	15	6	2	7	16	18	−2	20	
11	Orense	15	4	7	4	14	13	+1	19	
12	Deportivo Cuenca	15	4	4	7	25	24	+1	16	
13	Mushuc Runa	15	4	4	7	12	21	−9	16	
14	Macará	15	3	4	8	18	29	−11	13	
15	Manta	15	2	6	7	11	21	−10	12	
16	Olmedo	15	0	1	14	9	49	−40	1	

Source: LigaPro, Soccerway
Rules for classification: 1) Points, 2) Goal difference, 3) Goals for, 4) Away goals for, 5) Head-to-head record, 6) Drawing of lots.

Aggregate table

Pos	Team	Pld	W	D	L	GF	GA	GD	Pts	Qualification or relegation
1	Emelec	30	19	7	4	59	29	+30	64	Qualification for Copa Libertadores group stage
2	Independiente del Valle (C)	30	18	7	5	56	27	+29	61	Qualification for Copa Libertadores group stage
3	Universidad Católica	30	15	9	6	54	33	+21	54	Qualification for Copa Libertadores second stage
4	Barcelona	30	15	6	9	51	33	+18	51	Qualification for Copa Libertadores first stage
5	9 de Octubre	30	15	5	10	47	38	+9	50	Qualification for Copa Sudamericana first stage (Note: Since the 2021 Copa Ecuador was cancelled due to the effects of the COVID-19 pandemic in Ecuador, the spot awarded to its champions (Copa Sudamericana first stage) was passed over to the aggregate table fourth best-placed team not qualified for the Copa Libertadores.)
6	LDU Quito	30	12	12	6	49	41	+8	48	Qualification for Copa Sudamericana first stage
7	Mushuc Runa	30	11	8	11	41	42	−1	41	Qualification for Copa Sudamericana first stage
8	Delfín	30	10	10	10	44	45	−1	40	Qualification for Copa Sudamericana first stage
9	Aucas	30	10	9	11	47	43	+4	39	
10	Macará	30	9	9	12	35	46	−11	36	
11	Técnico Universitario	30	8	11	11	24	26	−2	35	
12	Deportivo Cuenca	30	8	8	14	39	42	−3	32	
13	Orense	30	7	10	13	28	37	−9	31	
14	Guayaquil City	30	8	6	16	27	48	−21	30	
15	Manta (R)	30	6	10	14	29	46	−17	28	Relegation to Serie B
16	Olmedo (Note: Olmedo were deducted three points as punishment for failing to pay their creditors.) (R)	30	2	7	21	22	76	−54	10	Relegation to Serie B

Source: LigaPro
Rules for classification: 1) Points, 2) Goal difference, 3) Goals for, 4) Away goals for, 5) Head-to-head record, 6) Drawing of lots.
(C) Champions; (R) Relegated

==== Serie B ====
Pos	Team	Pld	W	D	L	GF	GA	GD	Pts	
1	Cumbayá (C, P)	36	20	7	9	47	36	+11	67	Champions, promoted to the 2022 Serie A
2	Gualaceo (P)	36	17	9	10	46	31	+15	60	Promoted to the 2022 Serie A
3	El Nacional	36	16	11	9	49	36	+13	59	
4	Chacaritas	36	12	13	11	35	34	+1	49	
5	América de Quito	36	10	17	9	41	33	+8	47	
6	Guayaquil Sport	36	14	5	17	41	53	−12	47	
7	Independiente Juniors	36	11	10	15	45	46	−1	43	
8	Atlético Santo Domingo	36	10	12	14	37	44	−7	42	
9	Atlético Porteño (R)	36	11	6	19	46	64	−18	39	Relegated to the 2022 Segunda Categoría
10	LDU Portoviejo (R)	36	9	10	17	42	52	−10	37	Relegated to the 2022 Segunda Categoría

Source: LigaPro
(C) Champions; (P) Promoted; (R) Relegated

==== Segunda Categoría ====
1st Round
Libertad	1	3	4
Fijalán	0	2	2
Unibolívar	2	2	4
Carlos Borbor Reyes	0	0	0
Universitario	0	0	0
Mineros	1	0	1
Santa Rita	0	0	0
Insutec	2	0	2
La Unión	2	3	5
Deportivo Bolívar	0	0	0
Espoli	1	0	1
Juventud	1	1	2
Portoviejo	0	2	2
Pastaza	0	0	0
Loja Federal	2	0	2
Miguel Iturralde	2	1	3
Dep. Santa Elena	1	2	3
Leones del Norte	3	1	4
Huancavilca	0	1	1
Aampetra	3	0	3
Vargas Torres	0	0	0 (3)
Dep. Santo Domingo (p)	0	0	0 (4)
UTC	0	0	0
Deportivo Colón	1	0	1
Atacames	0	1	1
Pelileo (a)	0	1	1
Santa Fe	0	1	1
Emanuel	1	1	2
Imbabura	2	3	5
Deportivo Guano	1	0	1
3 de Julio	0	0	0 (4)
Filanbanco (p)	0	0	0 (5)

2nd Round
Libertad	2	0	2
Unibolívar	0	1	1
Mineros	0	3	3
Insutec	1	3	4
La Unión	0	3	3
Juventud	0	1	1
Portoviejo	1	1	2
Miguel Iturralde	2	1	3
Leones del Norte	2	0	2
Aampetra	0	1	1
Dep. Santo Domingo	0	4	4
Deportivo Colón	1	1	2
Pelileo	0	2	2
Emanuel	1	0	1
Imbabura	2	3	5
Filanbanco	2	1	3

Quarterfinals
Libertad	4	2	6
Insutec	2	2	4
La Unión	4	1	5
Miguel Iturralde	0	0	0
Leones del Norte (p)	1	2	3 (4)
Dep. Santo Domingo	2	1	3 (3)
Pelileo	1	2	3
Imbabura	1	4	5

Semifinals
Libertad	0	1	1
La Unión	0	0	0
Leones del Norte	1	0	1
Imbabura	1	2	3

Finals
Libertad (p)	0 (6)
Imbabura	0 (5)

=== Copa Ecuador ===
The 2021 Copa Ecuador would have been held from the third week of August, but the tournament was cancelled after the company which held the broadcasting rights alleged problems.

=== Supercopa Ecuador ===
Preliminary round
Independiente del Valle	3
Delfín	5
9 de Octubre	2
Emelec	0

Semi-finals
LDU Quito	4
Delfín	2
Barcelona	1
9 de Octubre	0

Final
LDU Quito	1
Barcelona	0

==== Final ====
26 June 2021
15:00

Barcelona	0–1	LDU Quito
	Report	Br. Caicedo 4' (o.g.)

Estadio Banco Guayaquil, Sangolquí
Attendance: 0 (Note: All matches of the competition were played behind closed doors due to the COVID-19 pandemic in Ecuador.)
Referee: Roberto Sánchez
