= 2021 Copa Sudamericana group stage =

Football competition in South America

The 2021 Copa Sudamericana group stage was played from 20 April to 27 May 2021. A total of 32 teams competed in the group stage to decide eight of the 16 places in the final stages of the 2021 Copa Sudamericana.

== Draw ==
The draw for the group stage was held on 9 April 2021, 12:00 PYT (UTC−4), at the CONMEBOL Convention Centre in Luque, Paraguay.

Teams were seeded by their CONMEBOL Clubs ranking as of 1 February 2021 (shown in parentheses), taking into account the following three factors:

1. Performance in the last 10 years, taking into account Copa Libertadores and Copa Sudamericana results in the period 2011–2020.
2. Historical coefficient, taking into account Copa Libertadores and Copa Sudamericana results in the period 1960–2010 and 2002–2010 respectively.
3. Local tournament champion, with bonus points awarded to domestic league champions of the last 10 years.

For the group stage, the 32 teams were drawn into eight groups (Groups A–H) of four containing a team from each of the four pots. Teams from the same association could not be drawn into the same group, excluding the four losers of the Copa Libertadores third stage, which were seeded in Pot 4 and whose identity was not known at the time of the draw, and could be drawn into the same group with another team from the same association.

Group stage draw
Pot 1	Pot 2	Pot 3	Pot 4
(Argentina) Independiente (10); (Argentina) Lanús (17); (Brazil) Corinthians (23); (Brazil) Athletico Paranaense (24); (Ecuador) Emelec (25); (Bolivia) Jorge Wilstermann (38); (Argentina) Rosario Central (43); (Argentina) Newell's Old Boys (56)	(Chile) Palestino (62); (Colombia) Deportes Tolima (63); (Argentina) Arsenal (65); (Brazil) Bahia (67); (Peru) Melgar (71); (Colombia) La Equidad (99); (Chile) Huachipato (116); (Peru) Sport Huancayo (122)	(Bolivia) Guabirá (172); (Argentina) Talleres (178); (Paraguay) 12 de Octubre (180); (Ecuador) Aucas (195); (Brazil) Atlético Goianiense (199); (Venezuela) Aragua (217); (Paraguay) River Plate (217); (Brazil) Ceará (262)	(Brazil) Red Bull Bragantino (no rank); (Venezuela) Metropolitanos (no rank); (Uruguay) Montevideo City Torque (no rank); (Uruguay) Peñarol (8); Copa Libertadores Third stage loser G1; Copa Libertadores Third stage loser G2; Copa Libertadores Third stage loser G3; Copa Libertadores Third stage loser G4

Notes

1. ^{URU} The identity of the two first stage winners from Uruguay was not known at the time of the draw, and they were seeded in Pot 4.

The following were the four losers of the third stage of the 2021 Copa Libertadores qualifying stages which joined the 12 direct entrants and the 16 Copa Sudamericana first stage winners in the group stage.

Match	Third stage losers
G1	(Paraguay) Libertad (14)
G2	(Brazil) Grêmio (3)
G3	(Bolivia) Bolívar (29)
G4	(Argentina) San Lorenzo (15)

== Format ==
In the group stage, each group was played on a home-and-away round-robin basis. The teams were ranked according to the following criteria: 1. Points (3 points for a win, 1 point for a draw, and 0 points for a loss); 2. Goal difference; 3. Goals scored; 4. Away goals scored; 5. CONMEBOL ranking (Regulations Article 2.4.3).

The winners of each group advanced to the round of 16 of the final stages.

== Schedule ==
The schedule of each matchday was as follows (Regulations Article 2.2.2).

Matchday	Dates	Matches
Matchday 1	20–22 April 2021	Team 4 vs. Team 2, Team 3 vs. Team 1
Matchday 2	27–29 April 2021	Team 2 vs. Team 3, Team 1 vs. Team 4
Matchday 3	4–6 May 2021	Team 2 vs. Team 1, Team 4 vs. Team 3
Matchday 4	11–13 May 2021	Team 3 vs. Team 2, Team 4 vs. Team 1
Matchday 5	18–20 May 2021	Team 1 vs. Team 2, Team 3 vs. Team 4
Matchday 6	25–27 May 2021	Team 1 vs. Team 3, Team 2 vs. Team 4

== Groups ==
=== Group A ===
Pos	Team	Pld	W	D	L	GF	GA	GD	Pts	Qualification	ROS	HUA	SLO	12O
1	(Argentina) Rosario Central	6	3	2	1	10	3	+7	11	Round of 16	—	5–0	2–0	0–0
2	(Chile) Huachipato	6	2	2	2	4	10	−6	8		1–1	—	0–3	0–0
3	(Argentina) San Lorenzo	6	2	1	3	7	6	+1	7		1–2	0–1	—	1–1
4	(Paraguay) 12 de Octubre	6	1	3	2	3	5	−2	6		1–0	1–2	0–2	—

Source: CONMEBOL
20 April 2021
20:30 UTC−4

12 de Octubre (Paraguay)	1–0	(Argentina) Rosario Central
Velázquez 69'	Report

Estadio Luis Alfonso Giagni, Villa Elisa (Note: 12 de Octubre played their home matches at Estadio Luis Alfonso Giagni, Villa Elisa instead of their regular stadium Estadio Luis Alberto Salinas, Itauguá.)
Attendance: 0
Referee: Juan Soto (Venezuela)
21 April 2021
19:15 UTC−3

San Lorenzo (Argentina)	0–1	(Chile) Huachipato
	Report	C. Martínez 5'

Estadio Pedro Bidegain, Buenos Aires
Attendance: 0
Referee: Andrés Rojas (Colombia) (Note: Referee Carlos Betancur from Colombia, who was originally assigned to the San Lorenzo v Huachipato match was replaced by Andrés Rojas from Colombia.)

27 April 2021
20:30 UTC−4

Huachipato (Chile)	0–0	(Paraguay) 12 de Octubre
	Report

Estadio Sausalito, Viña del Mar (Note: Huachipato played their home matches at Estadio Sausalito, Viña del Mar instead of their regular stadium Estadio CAP, Talcahuano.)
Attendance: 0
Referee: Raúl Orosco (Bolivia)
28 April 2021
21:30 UTC−3

Rosario Central (Argentina)	2–0	(Argentina) San Lorenzo
Almada 11'; Gamba 81'	Report

Estadio Gigante de Arroyito, Rosario
Attendance: 0
Referee: Christian Ferreyra (Uruguay)

5 May 2021
18:15 UTC−4

Huachipato (Chile)	1–1	(Argentina) Rosario Central
Altamirano 33'	Report	Zabala 67'

Estadio Sausalito, Viña del Mar
Attendance: 0
Referee: Raphael Claus (Brazil)
6 May 2021
21:30 UTC−3

San Lorenzo (Argentina)	1–1	(Paraguay) 12 de Octubre
Troyansky 31'	Report	Núñez 45'

Estadio Pedro Bidegain, Buenos Aires
Attendance: 0
Referee: Wilton Sampaio (Brazil)

12 May 2021
18:15 UTC−4

12 de Octubre (Paraguay)	1–2	(Chile) Huachipato
Núñez 55'	Report	Mazzantti 25', 57'

Estadio Luis Alfonso Giagni, Villa Elisa
Attendance: 0
Referee: Flavio Rodrigues de Souza (Brazil)
12 May 2021
21:30 UTC−3

San Lorenzo (Argentina)	1–2	(Argentina) Rosario Central
Ávila 25' (o.g.)	Report	Gattoni 66' (o.g.); Vecchio 72'

Estadio Pedro Bidegain, Buenos Aires
Attendance: 0
Referee: Bruno Arleu (Brazil)

19 May 2021
21:30 UTC−3

Rosario Central (Argentina)	5–0	(Chile) Huachipato
Gamba 27'; Vecchio 36' (pen.); Gutiérrez 44' (o.g.); D. Martínez 45+1'; L. Martínez 78'	Report

Estadio Florencio Sola, Banfield (Note: Rosario Central played their home match against Huachipato at Estadio Florencio Sola, Banfield (first rescheduled at Estadio Pedro Bidegain, Buenos Aires) instead of their regular stadium Estadio Gigante de Arroyito, Rosario.)
Attendance: 0
Referee: Christian Ferreyra (Uruguay)
20 May 2021
18:15 UTC−4

12 de Octubre (Paraguay)	0–2	(Argentina) San Lorenzo
	Report	Díaz 45'; Ó. Romero 59'

Estadio Luis Alfonso Giagni, Villa Elisa
Attendance: 0
Referee: Rodolpho Toski (Brazil)

26 May 2021
21:30 UTC−3

Rosario Central (Argentina)	0–0	(Paraguay) 12 de Octubre
	Report

Estadio Florencio Sola, Banfield (Note: Rosario Central played their home match against 12 de Octubre at Estadio Florencio Sola, Banfield instead of their regular stadium Estadio Gigante de Arroyito, Rosario.)
Attendance: 0
Referee: Andrés Matonte (Uruguay)
26 May 2021
20:30 UTC−4

Huachipato (Chile)	0–3	(Argentina) San Lorenzo
	Report	Fernández 10', 32'; Sequeira 54'

Estadio Sausalito, Viña del Mar
Attendance: 0
Referee: Flavio Rodrigues de Souza (Brazil)

=== Group B ===
Pos	Team	Pld	W	D	L	GF	GA	GD	Pts	Qualification	IND	MCT	BAH	GUA
1	(Argentina) Independiente	6	4	2	0	11	5	+6	14	Round of 16	—	3–1	1–0	1–0
2	(Uruguay) Montevideo City Torque	6	3	2	1	15	7	+8	11		1–1	—	1–1	4–0
3	(Brazil) Bahia	6	2	2	2	11	8	+3	8		2–2	2–4	—	5–0
4	(Bolivia) Guabirá	6	0	0	6	1	18	−17	0		1–3	0–4	0–1	—

Source: CONMEBOL
21 April 2021
21:30 UTC−3

Montevideo City Torque (Uruguay)	1–1	(Brazil) Bahia
Pizzichillo 51'	Report	Rodriguinho 9'

Parque Alfredo Víctor Viera, Montevideo (Note: Montevideo City Torque played their home matches at Parque Alfredo Víctor Viera, Montevideo instead of their regular stadium Estadio Centenario, Montevideo.)
Attendance: 0
Referee: Luis Quiroz (Ecuador)
21 April 2021
20:30 UTC−4

Guabirá (Bolivia)	1–3	(Argentina) Independiente
Pascua 89'	Report	Herrera 8', 35', 52'

Estadio Gilberto Parada, Montero
Attendance: 0
Referee: Diego Haro (Peru)

27 April 2021
19:15 UTC−3

Bahia (Brazil)	5–0	(Bolivia) Guabirá
Alesson 8', 79'; Juninho 40'; Marcelo Ryan 65', 71'	Report

Estádio de Pituaçu, Salvador (Note: Bahia played their home matches at Estádio de Pituaçu, Salvador instead of their regular stadium Itaipava Arena Fonte Nova, Salvador.)
Attendance: 0
Referee: Cristian Garay (Chile)
28 April 2021
19:15 UTC−3

Independiente (Argentina)	3–1	(Uruguay) Montevideo City Torque
S. Romero 63'; Herrera 71'; Cóccaro 90+1' (o.g.)	Report	Del Prete 49'

Estadio Libertadores de América, Avellaneda
Attendance: 0
Referee: Kevin Ortega (Peru)

4 May 2021
19:15 UTC−3

Bahia (Brazil)	2–2	(Argentina) Independiente
Thaciano 57'; Luiz Otávio 82'	Report	Herrera 43' (pen.); Velasco 51' (pen.)

Estádio de Pituaçu, Salvador
Attendance: 0
Referee: Roberto Tobar (Chile) (Note: Referee Augusto Aragón from Ecuador, who was originally assigned to the Bahia v Independiente match, was replaced by Roberto Tobar from Chile.)
5 May 2021
19:15 UTC−3

Montevideo City Torque (Uruguay)	4–0	(Bolivia) Guabirá
Scotto 34'; Del Prete 71', 90+3'; Guerrero 90+1'	Report

Parque Alfredo Víctor Viera, Montevideo
Attendance: 0
Referee: Marlon Vera (Ecuador)

11 May 2021
21:30 UTC−3

Montevideo City Torque (Uruguay)	1–1	(Argentina) Independiente
Del Prete 44' (pen.)	Report	Herrera 90+1' (pen.)

Parque Alfredo Víctor Viera, Montevideo
Attendance: 0
Referee: José Méndez (Paraguay)
13 May 2021
18:15 UTC−4

Guabirá (Bolivia)	0–1	(Brazil) Bahia
	Report	Gilberto 57'

Estadio Gilberto Parada, Montero
Attendance: 0
Referee: Juan Soto (Venezuela)

18 May 2021
19:15 UTC−3

Independiente (Argentina)	1–0	(Brazil) Bahia
Thonny Anderson 83' (o.g.)	Report

Estadio Libertadores de América, Avellaneda
Attendance: 0
Referee: Andrés Rojas (Colombia)
20 May 2021
20:30 UTC−4

Guabirá (Bolivia)	0–4	(Uruguay) Montevideo City Torque
	Report	Del Prete 2'; Pizzichillo 24'; Teuten 48'; Álvarez 52'

Estadio Gilberto Parada, Montero
Attendance: 0
Referee: Augusto Menéndez (Peru)

26 May 2021
19:15 UTC−3

Independiente (Argentina)	1–0	(Bolivia) Guabirá
S. Romero 83'	Report

Estadio Libertadores de América, Avellaneda
Attendance: 0
Referee: Derlis López (Paraguay)
26 May 2021
19:15 UTC−3

Bahia (Brazil)	2–4	(Uruguay) Montevideo City Torque
Thonny Anderson 2'; Nino Paraíba 47'	Report	Pizzichillo 25'; Scotto 39'; Allende 77'; Guzmán 90+2'

Estádio de Pituaçu, Salvador
Attendance: 0
Referee: Mario Díaz de Vivar (Paraguay)

=== Group C ===
Pos	Team	Pld	W	D	L	GF	GA	GD	Pts	Qualification	ARS	CEA	BOL	WIL
1	(Argentina) Arsenal	6	3	2	1	9	4	+5	11	Round of 16	—	0–0	3–1	3–0
2	(Brazil) Ceará	6	2	3	1	5	2	+3	9		0–0	—	2–0	3–1
3	(Bolivia) Bolívar	6	1	3	2	5	8	−3	6		2–1	0–0	—	2–2
4	(Bolivia) Jorge Wilstermann	6	1	2	3	5	10	−5	5		1–2	1–0	0–0	—

Source: CONMEBOL
21 April 2021
19:15 UTC−3

Ceará (Brazil)	3–1	(Bolivia) Jorge Wilstermann
Pedrinho 29'; Mendoza 37' (pen.); Vinícius 82'	Report	Osorio 54' (pen.)

Estádio Castelão, Fortaleza
Attendance: 0
Referee: Nicolás Gamboa (Chile)
22 April 2021 (Note: The Bolívar v Arsenal match was originally scheduled for 21 April 2021, 21:30 UTC–3, but was rescheduled to 22 April 2021, 19:15 UTC–3.)
18:15 UTC−4

Bolívar (Bolivia)	2–1	(Argentina) Arsenal
Fernández 42'; Saavedra 61'	Report	Bottinelli 90+2'

Estadio Hernando Siles, La Paz
Attendance: 0
Referee: Franklin Congo (Ecuador)

27 April 2021
21:30 UTC−3

Arsenal (Argentina)	0–0	(Brazil) Ceará
	Report

Estadio Julio Humberto Grondona, Sarandí
Attendance: 0
Referee: José Méndez (Paraguay)
29 April 2021
18:15 UTC−4

Jorge Wilstermann (Bolivia)	0–0	(Bolivia) Bolívar
	Report

Estadio Félix Capriles, Cochabamba
Attendance: 0
Referee: Andrés Rojas (Colombia)

5 May 2021
18:15 UTC−4

Bolívar (Bolivia)	0–0	(Brazil) Ceará
	Report

Estadio Hernando Siles, La Paz
Attendance: 0
Referee: Daniel Fedorczuk (Uruguay)
6 May 2021
19:15 UTC−3

Arsenal (Argentina)	3–0	(Bolivia) Jorge Wilstermann
Albertengo 1'; Candia 84', 87'	Report

Estadio Julio Humberto Grondona, Sarandí
Attendance: 0
Referee: Ángelo Hermosilla (Chile)

12 May 2021
19:15 UTC−3

Ceará (Brazil)	0–0	(Argentina) Arsenal
	Report

Estádio Castelão, Fortaleza
Attendance: 0
Referee: Roberto Tobar (Chile)
12 May 2021
20:30 UTC−4

Bolívar (Bolivia)	2–2	(Bolivia) Jorge Wilstermann
Saavedra 23' (pen.), 42' (pen.)	Report	Osorio 6' (pen.); Arano 86'

Estadio Hernando Siles, La Paz
Attendance: 0
Referee: Kevin Ortega (Peru)

19 May 2021
18:15 UTC−4

Jorge Wilstermann (Bolivia)	1–2	(Argentina) Arsenal
Osorio 38' (pen.)	Report	Albertengo 61'; Farioli 67'

Estadio Félix Capriles, Cochabamba
Attendance: 0
Referee: Carlos Betancur (Colombia)
20 May 2021
19:15 UTC−3

Ceará (Brazil)	2–0	(Bolivia) Bolívar
Lima 45'; Vinícius 84' (pen.)	Report

Estádio Castelão, Fortaleza
Attendance: 0
Referee: José Argote (Venezuela)

27 May 2021
18:15 UTC−4

Jorge Wilstermann (Bolivia)	1–0	(Brazil) Ceará
Rodríguez 74'	Report

Estadio Félix Capriles, Cochabamba
Attendance: 0
Referee: Guillermo Guerrero (Ecuador)
27 May 2021
19:15 UTC−3

Arsenal (Argentina)	3–1	(Bolivia) Bolívar
Albertengo 14', 47'; Sepúlveda 45+3'	Report	Quinteros 64'

Estadio Julio Humberto Grondona, Sarandí
Attendance: 0
Referee: Jhon Ospina (Colombia)

=== Group D ===
Pos	Team	Pld	W	D	L	GF	GA	GD	Pts	Qualification	CAP	MEL	AUC	MET
1	(Brazil) Athletico Paranaense	6	5	0	1	8	1	+7	15	Round of 16	—	1–0	4–0	1–0
2	(Peru) Melgar	6	3	1	2	7	5	+2	10		1–0	—	2–0	0–0
3	(Ecuador) Aucas	6	2	0	4	7	11	−4	6		0–1	2–1	—	3–0
4	(Venezuela) Metropolitanos	6	1	1	4	5	10	−5	4		0–1	2–3	3–2	—

Source: CONMEBOL
20 April 2021
18:15 UTC−4

Metropolitanos (Venezuela)	2–3	(Peru) Melgar
Bahachille 9'; Bustillo 20'	Report	Cuesta 45+5'; Iberico 53'; Vidales 88'

Estadio Olímpico de la UCV, Caracas
Attendance: 0
Referee: Carlos Herrera (Colombia) (Note: Referee Christian Alemán from Bolivia, who was originally assigned to the Metropolitanos v Melgar match was replaced by Carlos Herrera from Colombia.)
20 April 2021
19:30 UTC−5

Aucas (Ecuador)	0–1	(Brazil) Athletico Paranaense
	Report	Erick 38'

Estadio Gonzalo Pozo Ripalda, Quito
Attendance: 0
Referee: Piero Maza (Chile)

28 April 2021
19:15 UTC−3

Athletico Paranaense (Brazil)	1–0	(Venezuela) Metropolitanos
Kayzer 54'	Report

Arena da Baixada, Curitiba
Attendance: 0
Referee: Gustavo Tejera (Uruguay)
28 April 2021
19:30 UTC−5

Melgar (Peru)	2–0	(Ecuador) Aucas
Cuesta 21' (pen.), 53'	Report

Estadio Nacional, Lima (Note: Melgar played their home matches against Aucas and Athletico Paranaense at Estadio Nacional, Lima and played their home match against Metropolitanos at Estadio Monumental, Lima instead of their regular stadium Estadio Monumental de la UNSA, Arequipa.)
Attendance: 0
Referee: Carlos Ortega (Colombia)

4 May 2021
18:15 UTC−4

Metropolitanos (Venezuela)	3–2	(Ecuador) Aucas
Flores 14'; Moreno 51'; Pavone 65' (pen.)	Report	Ordóñez 67' (pen.); Carrera 69'

Estadio Olímpico de la UCV, Caracas
Attendance: 0
Referee: Fernando Espinoza (Argentina)
4 May 2021
19:30 UTC−5

Melgar (Peru)	1–0	(Brazil) Athletico Paranaense
Bordacahar 50'	Report

Estadio Nacional, Lima
Attendance: 0
Referee: Carlos Betancur (Colombia)

11 May 2021
18:15 UTC−4

Metropolitanos (Venezuela)	0–1	(Brazil) Athletico Paranaense
	Report	Vitinho 61'

Estadio Olímpico de la UCV, Caracas
Attendance: 0
Referee: Derlis López (Paraguay)
13 May 2021
19:30 UTC−5

Aucas (Ecuador)	2–1	(Peru) Melgar
Vega 56'; Carrera 78'	Report	Cuesta 7'

Estadio Gonzalo Pozo Ripalda, Quito
Attendance: 0
Referee: Fernando Echenique (Argentina)

19 May 2021
21:30 UTC−3

Athletico Paranaense (Brazil)	1–0	(Peru) Melgar
Kayzer 43'	Report

Arena da Baixada, Curitiba
Attendance: 0
Referee: Andrés Matonte (Uruguay)
19 May 2021
19:30 UTC−5

Aucas (Ecuador)	3–0	(Venezuela) Metropolitanos
Ordóñez 39', 76'; Pizzorno 68'	Report

Estadio Gonzalo Pozo Ripalda, Quito
Attendance: 0
Referee: Christian Alemán (Bolivia)

27 May 2021
21:30 UTC−3

Athletico Paranaense (Brazil)	4–0	(Ecuador) Aucas
Christian 26'; Abner 36'; Vitinho 67'; Carlos Eduardo 90+2'	Report

Arena da Baixada, Curitiba
Attendance: 0
Referee: Andrés Merlos (Argentina)
27 May 2021
19:30 UTC−5

Melgar (Peru)	0–0	(Venezuela) Metropolitanos
	Report

Estadio Monumental, Lima
Attendance: 0
Referee: Gery Vargas (Bolivia)

=== Group E ===
Pos	Team	Pld	W	D	L	GF	GA	GD	Pts	Qualification	PEÑ	COR	RIV	SHU
1	(Uruguay) Peñarol	6	4	1	1	15	3	+12	13	Round of 16	—	4–0	3–0	5–1
2	(Brazil) Corinthians	6	3	1	2	12	6	+6	10		0–2	—	4–0	5–0
3	(Paraguay) River Plate	6	3	1	2	6	10	−4	10		2–1	0–0	—	2–1
4	(Peru) Sport Huancayo	6	0	1	5	3	17	−14	1		0–0	0–3	1–2	—

Source: CONMEBOL
22 April 2021
21:30 UTC−3

Peñarol (Uruguay)	5–1	(Peru) Sport Huancayo
Álvarez Martínez 16', 80'; Torres 33'; Kagelmacher 45'; Terans 69' (pen.)	Report	Liliu 17'

Estadio Campeón del Siglo, Montevideo
Attendance: 0
Referee: Alex Cajas (Ecuador)
22 April 2021
20:30 UTC−4

River Plate (Paraguay)	0–0	(Brazil) Corinthians
	Report

Estadio Defensores del Chaco, Asunción (Note: River Plate played their home matches at Estadio Defensores del Chaco, Asunción instead of their regular stadium Estadio River Plate, Asunción which did not meet CONMEBOL requirements.)
Attendance: 0
Referee: Darío Herrera (Argentina)

29 April 2021
17:15 UTC−5

Sport Huancayo (Peru)	1–2	(Paraguay) River Plate
Liliu 38'	Report	González 5', 43'

Estadio Nacional, Lima (Note: Sport Huancayo played their home matches against River Plate and Corinthians at Estadio Nacional, Lima and played their home match against Peñarol at Estadio Monumental, Lima instead of their regular stadium Estadio Huancayo, Huancayo.)
Attendance: 0
Referee: Nicolás Gallo (Colombia)
29 April 2021
19:15 UTC−3

Corinthians (Brazil)	0–2	(Uruguay) Peñarol
	Report	González 13'; Terans 56'

Arena Corinthians, São Paulo
Attendance: 0
Referee: Facundo Tello (Argentina) (Note: Referee Wilmar Roldán from Colombia, who was originally assigned to the Corinthians v Peñarol match was replaced by Facundo Tello from Argentina.)

6 May 2021
19:30 UTC−5

Sport Huancayo (Peru)	0–3	(Brazil) Corinthians
	Report	Luan 5', 76'; Cauê 31'

Estadio Nacional, Lima
Attendance: 0
Referee: Jhon Ospina (Colombia)
6 May 2021
21:30 UTC−3

Peñarol (Uruguay)	3–0	(Paraguay) River Plate
Kagelmacher 22'; Torres 80' (pen.); Canobbio 89'	Report

Estadio Campeón del Siglo, Montevideo
Attendance: 0
Referee: Carlos Orbe (Ecuador)

13 May 2021
20:30 UTC−4

River Plate (Paraguay)	2–1	(Peru) Sport Huancayo
Pérez 38'; González 62'	Report	Arroé 19'

Estadio Defensores del Chaco, Asunción
Attendance: 0
Referee: Ángelo Hermosilla (Chile)
13 May 2021
21:30 UTC−3

Peñarol (Uruguay)	4–0	(Brazil) Corinthians
Álvarez Martínez 5', 14', 69'; Canobbio 53'	Report

Estadio Campeón del Siglo, Montevideo
Attendance: 0
Referee: Néstor Pitana (Argentina)

18 May 2021
18:15 UTC−4

River Plate (Paraguay)	2–1	(Uruguay) Peñarol
Garcete 10'; Caballero 90+3'	Report	Álvarez Martínez 54'

Estadio Defensores del Chaco, Asunción
Attendance: 0
Referee: Fernando Echenique (Argentina)
20 May 2021
21:30 UTC−3

Corinthians (Brazil)	5–0	(Peru) Sport Huancayo
Gustavo Mosquito 11', 69'; Vital 35'; Gil 57'; Luan 82'	Report

Arena Corinthians, São Paulo
Attendance: 0
Referee: Ángelo Hermosilla (Chile)

26 May 2021
21:30 UTC−3

Corinthians (Brazil)	4–0	(Paraguay) River Plate
Ramiro 22', 59'; Jô 29'; Vital 34'	Report

Arena Corinthians, São Paulo
Attendance: 0
Referee: José Argote (Venezuela)
26 May 2021
19:30 UTC−5

Sport Huancayo (Peru)	0–0	(Uruguay) Peñarol
	Report

Estadio Monumental, Lima
Attendance: 0
Referee: Facundo Tello (Argentina)

=== Group F ===
Pos	Team	Pld	W	D	L	GF	GA	GD	Pts	Qualification	LIB	ACG	NOB	PAL
1	(Paraguay) Libertad	6	4	1	1	9	4	+5	13	Round of 16	—	1–2	1–0	2–0
2	(Brazil) Atlético Goianiense	6	2	4	0	4	2	+2	10		0–0	—	0–0	0–0
3	(Argentina) Newell's Old Boys	6	2	2	2	6	6	0	8		1–3	1–1	—	3–1
4	(Chile) Palestino	6	0	1	5	2	9	−7	1		1–2	0–1	0–1	—

Source: CONMEBOL
20 April 2021
19:15 UTC−3

Atlético Goianiense (Brazil)	0–0	(Argentina) Newell's Old Boys
	Report

Estádio Antônio Accioly, Goiânia
Attendance: 0
Referee: Gustavo Tejera (Uruguay)
22 April 2021
20:30 UTC−4

Libertad (Paraguay)	2–0	(Chile) Palestino
Bogarín 71'; Oviedo 73'	Report

Estadio Dr. Nicolás Leoz, Asunción
Attendance: 0
Referee: Orlando Bracamonte (Venezuela)

29 April 2021
20:30 UTC−4

Palestino (Chile)	0–1	(Brazil) Atlético Goianiense
	Report	Zé Roberto 11'

Estadio El Teniente, Rancagua (Note: Palestino played their home matches at Estadio El Teniente, Rancagua instead of their regular stadium Estadio Municipal de La Cisterna, Santiago, which did not meet CONMEBOL requirements.)
Attendance: 0
Referee: Augusto Menéndez (Peru)
29 April 2021
21:30 UTC−3

Newell's Old Boys (Argentina)	1–3	(Paraguay) Libertad
M. Rodríguez 90' (pen.)	Report	Bocanegra 36'; A. Martínez 55'; Bareiro 86'

Estadio Marcelo Bielsa, Rosario
Attendance: 0
Referee: Esteban Ostojich (Uruguay)

4 May 2021
22:00 UTC−4 (Note: The Palestino v Newell's Old Boys match, originally scheduled for 4 May 2021, 20:30 local time, was rescheduled to 22:00 local time.)

Palestino (Chile)	0–1	(Argentina) Newell's Old Boys
	Report	A. Rodríguez 90+2'

Estadio El Teniente, Rancagua
Attendance: 0
Referee: Víctor Carrillo (Peru)
6 May 2021
18:15 UTC−4

Libertad (Paraguay)	1–2	(Brazil) Atlético Goianiense
Bareiro 90+2'	Report	Zé Roberto 40'; Arnaldo 86'

Estadio Defensores del Chaco, Asunción (Note: Libertad played their home match against Atlético Goianiense at Estadio Defensores del Chaco, Asunción instead of their regular stadium Estadio Dr. Nicolás Leoz, Asunción.)
Attendance: 0
Referee: Gery Vargas (Bolivia)

12 May 2021
21:30 UTC−3

Atlético Goianiense (Brazil)	0–0	(Chile) Palestino
	Report

Estádio Antônio Accioly, Goiânia
Attendance: 0
Referee: Carlos Orbe (Ecuador)
13 May 2021
20:30 UTC−4

Libertad (Paraguay)	1–0	(Argentina) Newell's Old Boys
Ferreira 9'	Report

Estadio Dr. Nicolás Leoz, Asunción
Attendance: 0
Referee: Gustavo Tejera (Uruguay)

19 May 2021
19:15 UTC−3

Atlético Goianiense (Brazil)	0–0	(Paraguay) Libertad
	Report

Estádio Antônio Accioly, Goiânia
Attendance: 0
Referee: Guillermo Guerrero (Ecuador)
20 May 2021
19:15 UTC−3

Newell's Old Boys (Argentina)	3–1	(Chile) Palestino
Castro 5'; Sordo 70'; Suárez 85' (o.g.)	Report	Sánchez Sotelo 47'

Estadio Marcelo Bielsa, Rosario
Attendance: 0
Referee: Daniel Fedorczuk (Uruguay)

25 May 2021
19:15 UTC−3

Newell's Old Boys (Argentina)	1–1	(Brazil) Atlético Goianiense
Giani 54'	Report	Danilo 73'

Estadio Marcelo Bielsa, Rosario
Attendance: 0
Referee: Nicolás Gallo (Colombia)
25 May 2021
18:15 UTC−4

Palestino (Chile)	1–2	(Paraguay) Libertad
Benítez 44'	Report	Báez 54' (pen.); H. Martínez 73'

Estadio El Teniente, Rancagua
Attendance: 0
Referee: Christian Ferreyra (Uruguay)

=== Group G ===
Pos	Team	Pld	W	D	L	GF	GA	GD	Pts	Qualification	RBB	EME	TAL	TOL
1	(Brazil) Red Bull Bragantino	6	4	0	2	7	6	+1	12	Round of 16	—	2–0	0–1	2–1
2	(Ecuador) Emelec	6	3	1	2	9	8	+1	10		3–0	—	1–4	2–0
3	(Argentina) Talleres	6	2	2	2	7	5	+2	8		0–1	1–2	—	0–0
4	(Colombia) Deportes Tolima	6	0	3	3	4	8	−4	3		1–2	1–1	1–1	—

Source: CONMEBOL
22 April 2021
16:00 UTC−3 (Note: The Talleres v Emelec match was originally scheduled for 22 April 2021, 21:30 local time, but was rescheduled to 16:00 local time.)

Talleres (Argentina)	1–2	(Ecuador) Emelec
Fragapane 39'	Report	S. Rodríguez 73' (pen.); Barceló 78'

Estadio Mario Alberto Kempes, Córdoba
Attendance: 0
Referee: Kevin Ortega (Peru)
22 April 2021
19:15 UTC−3

Red Bull Bragantino (Brazil)	2–1	(Colombia) Deportes Tolima
Castrillón 10' (o.g.); Ytalo 45'	Report	Mosquera 90+4' (pen.)

Estádio Nabi Abi Chedid, Bragança Paulista
Attendance: 0
Referee: Daniel Fedorczuk (Uruguay)

28 April 2021
19:30 UTC−5

Deportes Tolima (Colombia)	1–1	(Argentina) Talleres
Campaz 56'	Report	Tenaglia 43'

Estadio Manuel Murillo Toro, Ibagué
Attendance: 0
Referee: Alexis Herrera (Venezuela)
28 April 2021
19:30 UTC−5

Emelec (Ecuador)	3–0	(Brazil) Red Bull Bragantino
Aderlan 49' (o.g.); Zapata 64'; Cabeza 86'	Report

Estadio George Capwell, Guayaquil
Attendance: 0
Referee: Yender Herrera (Venezuela)

5 May 2021
21:30 UTC−3

Red Bull Bragantino (Brazil)	0–1	(Argentina) Talleres
	Report	Valoyes 90+3'

Estádio Nabi Abi Chedid, Bragança Paulista
Attendance: 0
Referee: Nicolás Gamboa (Chile)
7 May 2021 (Note: The Deportes Tolima v Emelec match, originally scheduled for 5 May 2021, 19:30 local time at Estadio Manuel Murillo Toro, Ibagué was rescheduled for 7 May 2021, 19:00 local time at Estadio Monumental, Lima (Peru) due to civil unrest in Colombia.)
19:00 UTC−5

Deportes Tolima (Colombia)	1–1	(Ecuador) Emelec
Mosquera 22' (pen.)	Report	Zapata 41'

Estadio Monumental, Lima (Peru)
Attendance: 0
Referee: Diego Haro (Peru) (Note: Referee Eber Aquino from Paraguay, who was originally assigned to the Deportes Tolima v Emelec match, was replaced by Diego Haro from Peru.)

11 May 2021
19:15 UTC−3 (Note: The Red Bull Bragantino v Emelec match, originally scheduled for 11 May 2021, 21:30 local time, was rescheduled to 19:15 local time.)

Red Bull Bragantino (Brazil)	2–0	(Ecuador) Emelec
Fabrício Bruno 29'; Artur 82'	Report

Estádio Nabi Abi Chedid, Bragança Paulista
Attendance: 0
Referee: Alexis Herrera (Venezuela)
11 May 2021
21:30 UTC−3 (Note: The Talleres v Deportes Tolima match, originally scheduled for 11 May 2021, 19:15 local time, was rescheduled to 21:30 local time.)

Talleres (Argentina)	0–0	(Colombia) Deportes Tolima
	Report

Estadio Mario Alberto Kempes, Córdoba
Attendance: 0
Referee: Víctor Carrillo (Peru) (Note: Referee Andrés Matonte from Uruguay, who was originally assigned to the Talleres v Deportes Tolima match, was replaced by Víctor Carrillo from Peru.)

18 May 2021
21:30 UTC−3

Talleres (Argentina)	0–1	(Brazil) Red Bull Bragantino
	Report	Helinho 28'

Estadio Mario Alberto Kempes, Córdoba
Attendance: 0
Referee: Leodán González (Uruguay)
19 May 2021 (Note: The Emelec v Deportes Tolima match, originally scheduled on 18 May 2021, 19:30 local time, was rescheduled to 19 May 2021, 17:15 local time.)
17:15 UTC−5

Emelec (Ecuador)	2–0	(Colombia) Deportes Tolima
Angulo 71' (o.g.); Rojas 72'	Report

Estadio George Capwell, Guayaquil
Attendance: 0
Referee: Gery Vargas (Bolivia)

25 May 2021
19:30 UTC−5

Emelec (Ecuador)	1–4	(Argentina) Talleres
S. Rodríguez 73'	Report	E. Díaz 13'; Auzqui 24'; Martino 38'; Komar 82'

Estadio George Capwell, Guayaquil
Attendance: 0
Referee: Yender Herrera (Venezuela)
25 May 2021
19:30 UTC−5

Deportes Tolima (Colombia)	1–2	(Brazil) Red Bull Bragantino
Caicedo 37'	Report	Ytalo 41'; Lucas Evangelista 80'

Estadio Polideportivo de Pueblo Nuevo, San Cristóbal (Venezuela) (Note: Deportes Tolima played their home match against Red Bull Bragantino at Estadio Polideportivo de Pueblo Nuevo, San Cristóbal (Venezuela) instead of their regular home stadium Estadio Manuel Murillo Toro, Ibagué due to civil unrest in Colombia.)
Attendance: 0
Referee: Jesús Valenzuela (Venezuela)

=== Group H ===
Pos	Team	Pld	W	D	L	GF	GA	GD	Pts	Qualification	GRE	LAN	EQU	ARA
1	(Brazil) Grêmio	6	5	1	0	21	5	+16	16	Round of 16	—	3–1	2–1	8–0
2	(Argentina) Lanús	6	3	1	2	8	6	+2	10		1–2	—	4–1	0–0
3	(Colombia) La Equidad	6	2	1	3	6	9	−3	7		0–0	0–1	—	2–1
4	(Venezuela) Aragua	6	0	1	5	4	19	−15	1		2–6	0–1	1–2	—

Source: CONMEBOL
22 April 2021
19:15 UTC−3

Grêmio (Brazil)	2–1	(Colombia) La Equidad
Diego Souza 37'; Miranda 77'	Report	Duarte 90'

Arena do Grêmio, Porto Alegre
Attendance: 0
Referee: Eber Aquino (Paraguay)
22 April 2021
18:15 UTC−4

Aragua (Venezuela)	0–1	(Argentina) Lanús
	Report	López 90'

Estadio Olímpico de la UCV, Caracas (Note: Aragua played their home matches at Estadio Olímpico de la UCV, Caracas instead of their regular stadium Estadio Olímpico Hermanos Ghersi Páez, Maracay.)
Attendance: 0
Referee: Raúl Orosco (Bolivia)

29 April 2021
19:30 UTC−5

La Equidad (Colombia)	2–1	(Venezuela) Aragua
Colina 17'; Rodríguez 54'	Report	Manrique 72'

Estadio Hernán Ramírez Villegas, Pereira (Note: La Equidad played their home match against Aragua at Estadio Hernán Ramírez Villegas, Pereira instead of their regular stadium Estadio Metropolitano de Techo, Bogotá due to measures issued by the local government of Bogotá to contain the COVID-19 pandemic.)
Attendance: 0
Referee: Michael Espinoza (Peru)
29 April 2021
21:30 UTC−3

Lanús (Argentina)	1–2	(Brazil) Grêmio
Belmonte 69'	Report	Pereira 34'; Ferreira 86'

Estadio Ciudad de Lanús, Lanús
Attendance: 0
Referee: Piero Maza (Chile)

6 May 2021
19:15 UTC−3

Grêmio (Brazil)	8–0	(Venezuela) Aragua
Luiz Fernando 3', 18'; Diego Souza 21' (pen.); Ferreira 22', 24'; Hernández 28' (o.g.); Maicon 64' (pen.); Churín 77'	Report

Arena do Grêmio, Porto Alegre
Attendance: 0
Referee: Guillermo Guerrero (Ecuador)
6 May 2021
22:00 UTC−4 (Note: The La Equidad v Lanús match, originally scheduled for 6 May 2021, 19:30 local time at Estadio Centenario, Armenia was rescheduled to 6 May 2021, 22:00 local time at Estadio Defensores del Chaco, Asunción (Paraguay) due to civil unrest in Colombia.)

La Equidad (Colombia)	0–1	(Argentina) Lanús
	Report	Vera 27'

Estadio Defensores del Chaco, Asunción (Paraguay)
Attendance: 0
Referee: Derlis López (Paraguay) (Note: Referee Juan López from Paraguay, who was originally assigned to the La Equidad v Lanús match, was replaced by Derlis López from Paraguay.)

13 May 2021
18:15 UTC−4

Aragua (Venezuela)	1–2	(Colombia) La Equidad
Rivillo 44'	Report	Duarte 15'; Herazo 90+3' (pen.)

Estadio Olímpico de la UCV, Caracas
Attendance: 0
Referee: Gery Vargas (Bolivia)
13 May 2021
19:15 UTC−3

Grêmio (Brazil)	3–1	(Argentina) Lanús
Matheus Henrique 3'; Ferreira 22', 78'	Report	Burdisso 6'

Arena do Grêmio, Porto Alegre
Attendance: 0
Referee: Daniel Fedorczuk (Uruguay)

20 May 2021
21:30 UTC−3

Lanús (Argentina)	4–1	(Colombia) La Equidad
Sand 45', 64'; Acosta 51'; De la Vega 79'	Report	Herazo 77'

Estadio Ciudad de Lanús, Lanús
Attendance: 0
Referee: Gustavo Tejera (Uruguay)
20 May 2021
20:30 UTC−4

Aragua (Venezuela)	2–6	(Brazil) Grêmio
Stephens 48'; García 89'	Report	Léo Chú 20'; Ricardinho 31'; Darlan 53'; Pepê 69'; Elias 90+2', 90+3'

Estadio Olímpico de la UCV, Caracas
Attendance: 0
Referee: Mario Díaz de Vivar (Paraguay)

27 May 2021
21:30 UTC−3

Lanús (Argentina)	0–0	(Venezuela) Aragua
	Report

Estadio Ciudad de Lanús, Lanús
Attendance: 0
Referee: Michael Espinoza (Peru)
27 May 2021
19:30 UTC−5

La Equidad (Colombia)	0–0	(Brazil) Grêmio
	Report

Estadio Bellavista, Ambato (Ecuador) (Note: La Equidad played their home match against Grêmio at Estadio Bellavista, Ambato (Ecuador) instead of their regular stadium Estadio Metropolitano de Techo, Bogotá due to civil unrest in Colombia.)
Attendance: 0
Referee: Marlon Vera (Ecuador)
