= 2021 Copa Sudamericana final stages =

The 2021 Copa Sudamericana final stages was played from 13 July to 20 November 2021. A total of 16 teams competed in the final stages to decide the champions of the 2021 Copa Sudamericana, with the final played in Montevideo, Uruguay at Estadio Centenario.

== Qualified teams ==
The winners of each of the eight groups in the Copa Sudamericana group stage as well as the third-placed teams of each of the eight groups in the Copa Libertadores group stage advanced to the round of 16.

=== Copa Sudamericana group stage winners ===
Group	Winners
A	(Argentina) Rosario Central
B	(Argentina) Independiente
C	(Argentina) Arsenal
D	(Brazil) Athletico Paranaense
E	(Uruguay) Peñarol
F	(Paraguay) Libertad
G	(Brazil) Red Bull Bragantino
H	(Brazil) Grêmio

=== Copa Libertadores group stage third-placed teams ===
Group	Third-placed teams
A	(Ecuador) Independiente del Valle
B	(Venezuela) Deportivo Táchira
C	(Brazil) Santos
D	(Colombia) Junior
E	(Peru) Sporting Cristal
F	(Uruguay) Nacional
G	(Ecuador) LDU Quito
H	(Colombia) América de Cali

=== Seeding ===
Starting from the round of 16, the teams are seeded according to their results in the group stage, with the Copa Sudamericana group winners (Pot 1) seeded 1–8, and the Copa Libertadores group third-placed teams (Pot 2) seeded 9–16.

Seed	Grp	Team	Pld	W	D	L	GF	GA	GD	Pts	Round of 16 draw
1	SH	(Brazil) Grêmio	6	5	1	0	21	5	+16	16	Pot 1
2	SD	(Brazil) Athletico Paranaense	6	5	0	1	8	1	+7	15	Pot 1
3	SB	(Argentina) Independiente	6	4	2	0	11	5	+6	14	Pot 1
4	SE	(Uruguay) Peñarol	6	4	1	1	15	3	+12	13	Pot 1
5	SF	(Paraguay) Libertad	6	4	1	1	9	4	+5	13	Pot 1
6	SG	(Brazil) Red Bull Bragantino	6	4	0	2	7	6	+1	12	Pot 1
7	SA	(Argentina) Rosario Central	6	3	2	1	10	3	+7	11	Pot 1
8	SC	(Argentina) Arsenal	6	3	2	1	9	4	+5	11	Pot 1
9	LB	(Venezuela) Deportivo Táchira	6	3	0	3	14	17	−3	9	Pot 2
10	LG	(Ecuador) LDU Quito	6	2	2	2	15	13	+2	8	Pot 2
11	LF	(Uruguay) Nacional	6	2	2	2	8	9	−1	8	Pot 2
12	LD	(Colombia) Junior	6	1	4	1	6	6	0	7	Pot 2
13	LC	(Brazil) Santos	6	2	0	4	8	9	−1	6	Pot 2
14	LA	(Ecuador) Independiente del Valle	6	1	2	3	8	11	−3	5	Pot 2
15	LH	(Colombia) América de Cali	6	1	1	4	5	9	−4	4	Pot 2
16	LE	(Peru) Sporting Cristal	6	1	1	4	3	10	−7	4	Pot 2

Source: CONMEBOL
Rules for classification: 1) Higher position in group; 2) Points; 3) Goal difference; 4) Goals scored; 5) Away goals scored; 6) CONMEBOL ranking (Regulations Article 2.4.3).

== Format ==
Starting from the round of 16, the teams played a single-elimination tournament with the following rules:

- In the round of 16, quarter-finals and semi-finals, each tie was played on a home-and-away two-legged basis, with the higher-seeded team hosting the second leg (Regulations Article 2.2.3). If tied on aggregate, the away goals rule was used. If still tied, extra time was not played, and a penalty shoot-out was used to determine the winners (Regulations Article 2.4.4).
- The final was played as a single match at a venue pre-selected by CONMEBOL, with the higher-seeded team designated as the "home" team for administrative purposes (Regulations Article 2.2.6). If tied after regulation, 30 minutes of extra time were played. If still tied after extra time, a penalty shoot-out was used to determine the winners (Regulations Article 2.4.5).

== Draw ==
The draw for the round of 16 was held on 1 June 2021, 12:00 PYT (UTC−4), at the CONMEBOL Convention Centre in Luque, Paraguay. For the round of 16, the 16 teams were drawn into eight ties (A–H) between a Copa Sudamericana group winner (Pot 1) and a Copa Libertadores group third-placed (Pot 2), with the Copa Sudamericana group winners hosting the second leg. Teams from the same association or the same group could be drawn into the same tie (Regulations Article 2.2.3.2).

== Bracket ==
The bracket starting from the round of 16 was determined as follows:

Round	Matchups
Round of 16	(Group winners host second leg, matchups decided by draw): Match A; Match B; Match C; Match D; Match E; Match F; Match G; Match H
Quarter-finals	(Higher-seeded team host second leg): Match S1: Winner A vs. Winner H; Match S2: Winner B vs. Winner G; Match S3: Winner C vs. Winner F; Match S4: Winner D vs. Winner E
Semi-finals	(Higher-seeded team host second leg): Match F1: Winner S1 vs. Winner S4; Match F2: Winner S2 vs. Winner S3
Final	(Higher-seeded team designated as "home" team): Winner F1 vs. Winner F2

The bracket was decided based on the round of 16 draw, which was held on 1 June 2021.

Round of 16
16	(Peru) Sporting Cristal	2	1	3
8	(Argentina) Arsenal	1	1	2
11	(Uruguay) Nacional	1	1	2
4	(Uruguay) Peñarol (a)	2	0	2
10	(Ecuador) LDU Quito (a)	0	2	2
1	(Brazil) Grêmio	1	1	2
15	(Colombia) América de Cali	0	1	1
2	(Brazil) Athletico Paranaense	1	4	5
9	(Venezuela) Deportivo Táchira	2	0	2
7	(Argentina) Rosario Central	2	1	3
14	(Ecuador) Independiente del Valle	0	1	1
6	(Brazil) Red Bull Bragantino	2	1	3
13	(Brazil) Santos	1	1	2
3	(Argentina) Independiente	0	1	1
12	(Colombia) Junior	3	1	4
5	(Paraguay) Libertad (a)	4	0	4

Quarter-finals
16	(Peru) Sporting Cristal	1	0	1
4	(Uruguay) Peñarol	3	1	4
10	(Ecuador) LDU Quito	1	2	3
2	(Brazil) Athletico Paranaense	0	4	4
7	(Argentina) Rosario Central	3	0	3
6	(Brazil) Red Bull Bragantino	4	1	5
13	(Brazil) Santos	2	0	2
5	(Paraguay) Libertad (a)	1	1	2

Semi-finals
4	(Uruguay) Peñarol	1	0	1
2	(Brazil) Athletico Paranaense	2	2	4
6	(Brazil) Red Bull Bragantino	2	3	5
5	(Paraguay) Libertad	0	1	1

Final
20 November – Montevideo
2	(Brazil) Athletico Paranaense	1
6	(Brazil) Red Bull Bragantino	0

== Round of 16 ==
The first legs were played on 13–15 July, and the second legs were played on 20–22 July 2021.

Team 1	Agg.	Team 2	1st leg	2nd leg
Nacional (Uruguay)	2–2 (a)	(Uruguay) Peñarol	1–2	1–0
Independiente del Valle (Ecuador)	1–3	(Brazil) Red Bull Bragantino	0–2	1–1
Santos (Brazil)	2–1	(Argentina) Independiente	1–0	1–1
América de Cali (Colombia)	1–5	(Brazil) Athletico Paranaense	0–1	1–4
LDU Quito (Ecuador)	2–2 (a)	(Brazil) Grêmio	0–1	2–1
Junior (Colombia)	4–4 (a)	(Paraguay) Libertad	3–4	1–0
Deportivo Táchira (Venezuela)	2–3	(Argentina) Rosario Central	2–2	0–1
Sporting Cristal (Peru)	3–2	(Argentina) Arsenal	2–1	1–1

=== Match A ===
15 July 2021
21:30 UTC−3

Nacional (Uruguay)	1–2	(Uruguay) Peñarol
Bergessio 90+5'	Report	Canobbio 45+2'; Rodríguez 90+2'

Estadio Gran Parque Central, Montevideo
Attendance: 0
Referee: Néstor Pitana (Argentina)

22 July 2021
21:30 UTC−3

Peñarol (Uruguay)	0–1	(Uruguay) Nacional
	Report	Corujo 90+11'

Estadio Campeón del Siglo, Montevideo
Attendance: 0
Referee: Anderson Daronco (Brazil)

Tied 2–2 on aggregate, Peñarol won on away goals and advanced to the quarter-finals (Match S1).

=== Match B ===
14 July 2021
19:30 UTC−5

Independiente del Valle (Ecuador)	0–2	(Brazil) Red Bull Bragantino
	Report	Fabrício Bruno 19'; Ramires 66'

Estadio Banco Guayaquil, Sangolquí (Note: The Independiente del Valle v Red Bull Bragantino match, originally scheduled at Estadio Rodrigo Paz Delgado, Quito, was re-scheduled at Independiente del Valle's regular stadium Estadio Banco Guayaquil, Sangolquí.)
Attendance: 0
Referee: Roberto Tobar (Chile)

21 July 2021
21:30 UTC−3

Red Bull Bragantino (Brazil)	1–1	(Ecuador) Independiente del Valle
Cuello 52'	Report	Guerrero 4'

Estádio Nabi Abi Chedid, Bragança Paulista
Attendance: 0
Referee: Carlos Betancur (Colombia)

Red Bull Bragantino won 3–1 on aggregate and advanced to the quarter-finals (Match S2).

=== Match C ===
15 July 2021
19:15 UTC−3

Santos (Brazil)	1–0	(Argentina) Independiente
Kaio Jorge 69'	Report

Estádio Urbano Caldeira, Santos
Attendance: 0
Referee: Wilmar Roldán (Colombia)

22 July 2021
19:15 UTC−3

Independiente (Argentina)	1–1	(Brazil) Santos
González 68'	Report	Kaio Jorge 38'

Estadio Libertadores de América, Avellaneda
Attendance: 0
Referee: Diego Haro (Peru)

Santos won 2–1 on aggregate and advanced to the quarter-finals (Match S3).

=== Match D ===
13 July 2021
19:30 UTC−5

América de Cali (Colombia)	0–1	(Brazil) Athletico Paranaense
	Report	Nikão 73' (pen.)

Estadio Hernán Ramírez Villegas, Pereira (Note: América de Cali played their home match against Athletico Paranaense at Estadio Hernán Ramírez Villegas, Pereira due to works in the lighting system of their regular stadium Estadio Pascual Guerrero, Cali.)
Attendance: 0
Referee: José Argote (Venezuela)

20 July 2021
21:30 UTC−3

Athletico Paranaense (Brazil)	4–1	(Colombia) América de Cali
Vitinho 26', 71'; Nikão 79' (pen.); Canesin 90+7'	Report	Ramos 70' (pen.)

Arena da Baixada, Curitiba
Attendance: 0
Referee: Darío Herrera (Argentina)

Athletico Paranaense won 5–1 on aggregate and advanced to the quarter-finals (Match S4).

=== Match E ===
13 July 2021
17:15 UTC−5

LDU Quito (Ecuador)	0–1	(Brazil) Grêmio
	Report	Léo Pereira 19'

Estadio Rodrigo Paz Delgado, Quito
Attendance: 0
Referee: Cristian Garay (Chile)

20 July 2021
19:15 UTC−3

Grêmio (Brazil)	1–2	(Ecuador) LDU Quito
Diego Souza 23'	Report	Alcívar 44', 56' (pen.)

Arena do Grêmio, Porto Alegre
Attendance: 0
Referee: José Argote (Venezuela)

Tied 2–2 on aggregate, LDU Quito won on away goals and advanced to the quarter-finals (Match S4).

=== Match F ===
14 July 2021
19:30 UTC−5

Junior (Colombia)	3–4	(Paraguay) Libertad
Valencia 4'; Piedrahita 36'; Hinestroza 39'	Report	Villalba 12', 14'; Enciso 48'; H. Martínez 70'

Estadio Metropolitano Roberto Meléndez, Barranquilla
Attendance: 0
Referee: Wilton Sampaio (Brazil)

21 July 2021
20:30 UTC−4

Libertad (Paraguay)	0–1	(Colombia) Junior
	Report	González 87'

Estadio Defensores del Chaco, Asunción (Note: Libertad played their home matches at Estadio Defensores del Chaco, Asunción instead of their regular stadium Estadio Dr. Nicolás Leoz, Asunción.)
Attendance: 0
Referee: Andrés Matonte (Uruguay)

Tied 4–4 on aggregate, Libertad won on away goals and advanced to the quarter-finals (Match S3).

=== Match G ===
15 July 2021
20:30 UTC−4

Deportivo Táchira (Venezuela)	2–2	(Argentina) Rosario Central
Granados 59'; Angarita 90+4'	Report	Ferreyra 26'; Marinelli 90'

Estadio Polideportivo de Pueblo Nuevo, San Cristóbal
Attendance: 0
Referee: Flavio Rodrigues de Souza (Brazil)

22 July 2021
21:30 UTC−3

Rosario Central (Argentina)	1–0	(Venezuela) Deportivo Táchira
Vecchio 42'	Report

Estadio Gigante de Arroyito, Rosario
Attendance: 0
Referee: Daniel Fedorczuk (Uruguay)

Rosario Central won 3–2 on aggregate and advanced to the quarter-finals (Match S2).

=== Match H ===
14 July 2021
17:15 UTC−5

Sporting Cristal (Peru)	2–1	(Argentina) Arsenal
Hohberg 90' (pen.), 90+8'	Report	Mazzola 70'

Estadio Nacional, Lima (Note: Sporting Cristal played their home matches at Estadio Nacional, Lima instead of their regular stadium Estadio Alberto Gallardo, Lima which did not meet CONMEBOL requirements.)
Attendance: 0
Referee: Guillermo Guerrero (Ecuador)

21 July 2021
19:15 UTC−3

Arsenal (Argentina)	1–1	(Peru) Sporting Cristal
Albertengo 52'	Report	Gonzáles 85'

Estadio Julio Humberto Grondona, Sarandí
Attendance: 0
Referee: Raphael Claus (Brazil)

Sporting Cristal won 3–2 on aggregate and advanced to the quarter-finals (Match S1).

== Quarter-finals ==
The first legs were played on 10–12 August, and the second legs were played on 17–19 August 2021.

Team 1	Agg.	Team 2	1st leg	2nd leg
Sporting Cristal (Peru)	1–4	(Uruguay) Peñarol	1–3	0–1
Rosario Central (Argentina)	3–5	(Brazil) Red Bull Bragantino	3–4	0–1
Santos (Brazil)	2–2 (a)	(Paraguay) Libertad	2–1	0–1
LDU Quito (Ecuador)	3–4	(Brazil) Athletico Paranaense	1–0	2–4

=== Match S1 ===
11 August 2021
17:15 UTC−5

Sporting Cristal (Peru)	1–3	(Uruguay) Peñarol
Merlo 90'	Report	Álvarez Martínez 8'; Torres 19'; Gargano 90+5'

Estadio Nacional, Lima
Attendance: 0
Referee: Wilton Sampaio (Brazil)

18 August 2021
19:15 UTC−3

Peñarol (Uruguay)	1–0	(Peru) Sporting Cristal
Trindade 40'	Report

Estadio Campeón del Siglo, Montevideo
Attendance: 5,000
Referee: Facundo Tello (Argentina)

Peñarol won 4–1 on aggregate and advanced to the semi-finals (Match F1).

=== Match S2 ===
10 August 2021
19:15 UTC−3

Rosario Central (Argentina)	3–4	(Brazil) Red Bull Bragantino
Ruben 23', 55'; Caraglio 62'	Report	Bruno Praxedes 16'; Artur 20' (pen.), 43', 73'

Estadio Gigante de Arroyito, Rosario
Attendance: 0
Referee: Diego Haro (Peru)

17 August 2021
19:15 UTC−3

Red Bull Bragantino (Brazil)	1–0	(Argentina) Rosario Central
Artur 90+4'	Report

Estádio Nabi Abi Chedid, Bragança Paulista
Attendance: 0
Referee: Christian Ferreyra (Uruguay)

Red Bull Bragantino won 5–3 on aggregate and advanced to the semi-finals (Match F2).

=== Match S3 ===
12 August 2021
21:30 UTC−3

Santos (Brazil)	2–1	(Paraguay) Libertad
Sánchez 43' (pen.); Barboza 90+3' (o.g.)	Report	Bocanegra 59'

Estádio Urbano Caldeira, Santos
Attendance: 0
Referee: Leodán González (Uruguay)

19 August 2021
20:30 UTC−4

Libertad (Paraguay)	1–0	(Brazil) Santos
Ferreira 14'	Report

Estadio Defensores del Chaco, Asunción
Referee: Alexis Herrera (Venezuela)

Tied 2–2 on aggregate, Libertad won on away goals and advanced to the semi-finals (Match F2).

=== Match S4 ===
12 August 2021
17:15 UTC−5

LDU Quito (Ecuador)	1–0	(Brazil) Athletico Paranaense
Reasco 87'	Report

Estadio Rodrigo Paz Delgado, Quito
Attendance: 0
Referee: Andrés Matonte (Uruguay)

19 August 2021
19:15 UTC−3

Athletico Paranaense (Brazil)	4–2	(Ecuador) LDU Quito
Christian 26', 29'; Bissoli 62', 69' (pen.)	Report	Amarilla 11'; Julio 43'

Arena da Baixada, Curitiba
Attendance: 0
Referee: Eber Aquino (Paraguay)

Athletico Paranaense won 4–3 on aggregate and advanced to the semi-finals (Match F1).

== Semi-finals ==
The first legs were played on 22 and 23 September, and the second legs were played on 29 and 30 September 2021.

Team 1	Agg.	Team 2	1st leg	2nd leg
Peñarol (Uruguay)	1–4	(Brazil) Athletico Paranaense	1–2	0–2
Red Bull Bragantino (Brazil)	5–1	(Paraguay) Libertad	2–0	3–1

=== Match F1 ===
23 September 2021
21:30 UTC−3

Peñarol (Uruguay)	1–2	(Brazil) Athletico Paranaense
Álvarez Martínez 22'	Report	Terans 2'; Rocha 75'

Estadio Campeón del Siglo, Montevideo
Referee: Diego Haro (Peru)

30 September 2021
21:30 UTC−3

Athletico Paranaense (Brazil)	2–0	(Uruguay) Peñarol
Nikão 24' (pen.); Rocha 80'	Report

Arena da Baixada, Curitiba
Attendance: 0
Referee: Jesús Valenzuela (Venezuela)

Athletico Paranaense won 4–1 on aggregate and advanced to the final.

=== Match F2 ===
22 September 2021
19:15 UTC−3

Red Bull Bragantino (Brazil)	2–0	(Paraguay) Libertad
Ytalo 29'; Artur 50' (pen.)	Report

Estádio Nabi Abi Chedid, Bragança Paulista
Attendance: 1,203
Referee: Facundo Tello (Argentina)

29 September 2021
18:15 UTC−4

Libertad (Paraguay)	1–3	(Brazil) Red Bull Bragantino
Melgarejo 52'	Report	Cuello 9', 57'; Artur 82'

Estadio Defensores del Chaco, Asunción
Referee: Néstor Pitana (Argentina)

Red Bull Bragantino won 5–1 on aggregate and advanced to the final.

== Final ==
The final was played on 20 November 2021 at Estadio Centenario in Montevideo.

20 November 2021
17:00 UTC−3

Athletico Paranaense (Brazil)	1–0	(Brazil) Red Bull Bragantino
Nikão 29'	Report

Estadio Centenario, Montevideo
Attendance: 20,000
Referee: Andrés Matonte (Uruguay)
