= Valentín Rodríguez =

Uruguayan footballer (born 2001)

Personal information
- Full name: Diego Valentín Rodríguez Alonso
- Date of birth: 13 June 2001 (age 25)
- Place of birth: Montevideo, Uruguay
- Height: 1.73 m (5 ft 8 in)
- Position: Left-back

Youth career
- Peñarol

Senior career*
Years	Team	Apps	(Gls)
2021–2025	Peñarol	54	(0)
2024	→ Pachuca (loan)	5	(0)
2024	→ Gimnasia LP (loan)	12	(0)
2025	Al Wasl	0	(0)
2026	Defensor Sporting	7	(0)

International career
2024	Uruguay U23	6	(0)
- * Club domestic league appearances and goals as of 1 August 2026

Diego Valentín Rodríguez Alonso (born 13 June 2001) is a Uruguayan professional footballer who plays as a left-back.

== Club career ==
Rodríguez is a youth academy graduate of Peñarol. He made his professional debut for the club on 16 January 2021 in 1–1 draw against Cerro. He scored his first goal on 15 July 2021 in a 2–1 Copa Sudamericana win against Nacional.

On 5 February 2024, Rodríguez joined Mexican club Pachuca on a loan deal until the end of the year. In July 2024, he joined Argentine side Gimnasia LP on a one-year loan deal.

In February 2025, Rodríguez joined Emirati club Al Wasl on a contract until June 2028. In January 2026, he joined Defensor Sporting.

== International career ==
In January 2024, Rodríguez was named in Uruguay's squad for the 2024 CONMEBOL Pre-Olympic Tournament.

== Career statistics ==
As of 9 December 2023

Appearances and goals by club, season and competition
Club	Season	League			Cup		Continental		Other		Other	
Club	Season	Division	Apps	Goals	Apps	Goals	Apps	Goals	Apps	Goals	Apps	Goals
Peñarol	2020	UPD	6	0	—		0	0	—		6	0
Peñarol	2021	UPD	21	0	—		9 (Note: Appearances in Copa Sudamericana)	1	0	0	30	1
Peñarol	2022	UPD	3	0	1	0	0	0	0	0	4	0
Peñarol	2023	UPD	24	0	0	0	3	0	1 (Note: Appearance in play-offs)	0	28	0
Career total			54	0	1	0	12	1	1	0	68	1

== Honours ==
Peñarol

- Uruguayan Primera División: 2021

Pachuca

- CONCACAF Champions Cup: 2024
