= Mauro Estol =

Uruguayan footballer (born 1995)

Personal information
- Full name: Mauro Nahuel Estol Rodríguez
- Date of birth: 27 January 1995 (age 31)
- Place of birth: Montevideo, Uruguay
- Height: 1.76 m (5 ft 9 in)
- Position: Midfielder

Team information
- Current team: Cerro Largo
- Number: 7

Youth career
- –2009: Cerromar Club
- 2009–2014: Racing Club

Senior career*
Years	Team	Apps	(Gls)
2014–2019	Racing Club	76	(3)
2019–2020	Bisceglie	2	(0)
2020–2021	Juventud	23	(0)
2021–2022	Cerro Largo	29	(1)
2022	Montevideo Wanderers	18	(0)
2023–	Cerro Largo	11	(0)
- * Club domestic league appearances and goals as of 21:08, 28 February 2023 (UTC)

Mauro Nahuel Estol Rodríguez (born 27 January 1995), known as Mauro Estol, is a Uruguayan footballer who plays as a midfielder for Cerro Largo.

== Club career ==
=== Bisceglie ===
On 28 August 2019, he signed with the Italian club Bisceglie.
