= Bruno Gonçalves (footballer, born 2003) =

Brazilian footballer

Personal information
- Full name: Bruno Gonçalves de Jesus
- Date of birth: 14 March 2003 (age 23)
- Place of birth: São Paulo, Brazil
- Height: 1.74 m (5 ft 9 in)
- Position: Forward

Team information
- Current team: Red Bull Bragantino

Youth career
- 2017–2020: Red Bull Bragantino

Senior career*
| Years | Team | Apps | (Gls) |
| 2020–2021 | Red Bull Brasil | 23 | (0) |
| 2021– | Red Bull Bragantino | 44 | (7) |
| 2024–2025 | → Cercle Brugge (loan) | 14 | (1) |

International career^{‡}
| 2019 | Brazil U16 | 3 | (0) |
- * Club domestic league appearances and goals as of 11 May 2025 ‡ National team caps and goals as of 16:14, 19 August 2021 (UTC)

Bruno Gonçalves de Jesus (born 14 March 2003), known as Bruno Gonçalves or Bruninho, is a Brazilian footballer who plays as a forward for Red Bull Bragantino. He was included in The Guardian's "Next Generation 2020".

== Club career ==
On 10 July 2024, Bruninho joined Cercle Brugge in Belgium on a season-long loan with an option to buy.

== Career statistics ==
As of 13 March 2023.

| Club | Season | League | | | State League | | Cup | | Continental | | Other | | Total | |
| Club | Season | Division | Apps | Goals | Apps | Goals | Apps | Goals | Apps | Goals | Apps | Goals | Apps | Goals |
|---|---|---|---|---|---|---|---|---|---|---|---|---|---|---|
| Red Bull Brasil | 2020 | Paulista A2 | — | | 6 (Note: Appearances in the Campeonato Paulista Série A2) | 0 | — | | — | | — | | 6 | 0 |
| Red Bull Brasil | 2021 | Paulista A2 | — | | 17 | 0 | — | | — | | — | | 17 | 0 |
| Red Bull Brasil | Total | | — | | 23 | 0 | — | | — | | — | | 23 | 0 |
| Red Bull Bragantino | 2021 | Série A | 5 | 1 | 0 | 0 | 0 | 0 | 0 | 0 | — | | 5 | 1 |
| Red Bull Bragantino | 2022 | Série A | 2 | 0 | 2 (Note: Appearances in the Campeonato Paulista) | 0 | 1 | 0 | 0 | 0 | — | | 5 | 0 |
| Red Bull Bragantino | 2023 | Série A | 0 | 0 | 10 | 3 | 1 | 1 | 0 | 0 | — | | 11 | 4 |
| Red Bull Bragantino | Total | | 7 | 1 | 12 | 3 | 2 | 1 | 0 | 0 | — | | 21 | 5 |
| Career total | | | 7 | 1 | 35 | 3 | 2 | 1 | 0 | 0 | 0 | 0 | 44 | 5 |
