= Robinson Ferreira =

Uruguayan footballer (born 1992)

Personal information
- Full name: Robinson Martín Ferreira García
- Date of birth: 7 March 1992 (age 34)
- Place of birth: Melo, Uruguay
- Height: 1.80 m (5 ft 11 in)
- Position: Left back

Team information
- Current team: Racing de Montevideo
- Number: 17

Senior career*
Years	Team	Apps	(Gls)
2010–2021	Cerro Largo	138	(4)
2013–2014	→ San Felipe (loan)	29	(0)
2015–2016	→ Torque (loan)	3	(0)
2017–2019	→ Potros UAEM (loan)	29	(0)
2022–2023	Deportivo Maldonado	65	(0)
2024–	Racing de Montevideo	63	(3)
- * Club domestic league appearances and goals as of 1 October 2025

Robinson Martín Ferreira García (born 7 March 1992) is a Uruguayan footballer who plays for Racing de Montevideo.

He has played for clubs in Chile and Mexico, specifically Unión San Felipe and Torque.
