= Jonathan Benítez =

Argentine footballer (born 1991)

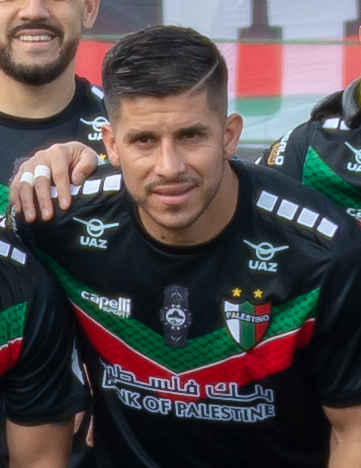
- Benítez with Palestino in 2023

Personal information
- Full name: Jonathan Óscar Benítez
- Date of birth: 4 September 1991 (age 35)
- Place of birth: Corrientes, Argentina
- Height: 1.78 m (5 ft 10 in)
- Position: Left winger

Team information
- Current team: Palestino
- Number: 11

Youth career
- Boca Unidos

Senior career*
Years	Team	Apps	(Gls)
2011–2016	Boca Unidos	33	(2)
2012–2013	→ Racing de Córdoba (loan)	24	(2)
2014–2015	→ Magallanes (loan)	33	(2)
2015–2016	→ Cobresal (loan)	19	(3)
2016–2018	Universidad de Concepción	51	(4)
2019	Coquimbo Unido	21	(2)
2020–	Palestino	117+	(14+)
- * Club domestic league appearances and goals as of 30 August 2021

Jonathan Óscar Benítez (born 4 September 1991) is an Argentine naturalized Chilean footballer who plays as a left winger for Primera División de Chile side Palestino.

== Personal life ==
Benítez naturalized Chilean by residence in 2024.
