= Humberto Osorio =

Colombian footballer (born 1988)

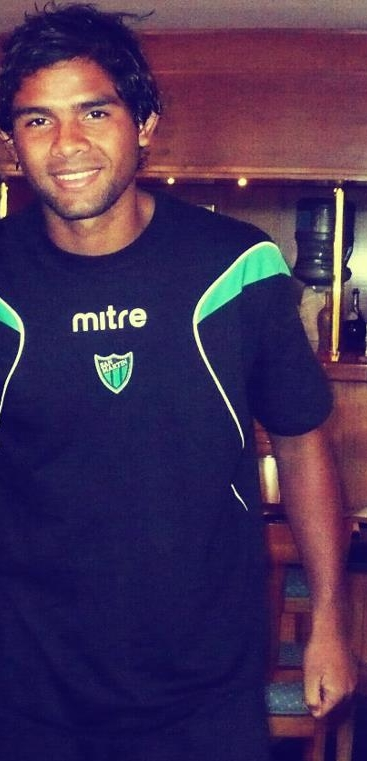
- Osorio in 2013

Personal information
- Full name: Humberto Segundo Osorio Botello
- Date of birth: 24 June 1988 (age 38)
- Place of birth: Valledupar, Colombia
- Height: 1.78 m (5 ft 10 in)
- Position: Forward

Team information
- Current team: Independiente Petrolero

Senior career*
Years	Team	Apps	(Gls)
2006–2008	América de Cali	17	(5)
2008	→ Estudiantes de Mérida (loan)	11	(3)
2009	Atlético Bucaramanga	16	(11)
2009–2010	Cúcuta Deportivo	15	(2)
2011	Inti Gas	24	(15)
2012	Millonarios	17	(12)
2012–2013	San Martín	28	(11)
2013–2014	Valladolid	16	(4)
2014–2017	Tijuana	5	(0)
2014	→ Dorados de Sinaloa (loan)	6	(2)
2016	→ Defensa y Justicia (loan)	7	(0)
2016–2017	→ Santa Fe (loan)	29	(6)
2018	Rionegro Águilas	33	(13)
2019–2020	San Martín SJ	17	(3)
2020–2022	Wilstermann	27	(10)
2023–	Independiente Petrolero	0	(0)
- * Club domestic league appearances and goals as of 19:58, 7 August 2021 (UTC)

Humberto Segundo Osorio Botello (born 24 June 1988) is a Colombian professional footballer who plays for Club Jorge Wilstermann as a forward.

== Career ==
Osorio joined Valladolid on 16 July 2013, in a three-year deal which saw him earn €350,000 per season. He made his debut on 17 August, as a substitute in a 2–1 home defeat to Athletic Bilbao. On 27 September he scored his first goal, in a 2–2 home draw with Málaga CF, and scored both of the team's goals on 9 February as they ended with the same result against Elche CF. He scored the equaliser against Real Madrid in a 1–1 home draw on 7 May. At the end of the season, Valladolid were relegated to the Second Division.

== Honours ==
América de Cali

- Categoría Primera A: 2008–II

Santa Fe

- Categoría Primera A: 2016–II
- Superliga Colombiana: 2017
- Suruga Bank Championship: 2016
