= Daniel Rivillo =

Venezuelan footballer (born 1996)

Personal information
- Full name: Daniel Alejandro Rivillo Godoy
- Date of birth: 21 December 1996 (age 29)
- Place of birth: Caracas, Venezuela
- Height: 1.78 m (5 ft 10 in)
- Position: Right-back

Team information
- Current team: Deportivo Rayo Zuliano
- Number: 3

Youth career
- Atlético Venezuela

Senior career*
Years	Team	Apps	(Gls)
2014–2016	Atlético Venezuela		
2016–2020	Zulia	89	(0)
2021	Aragua	21	(1)
2022—2025	Caracas	70	(2)
2026—	Deportivo Rayo Zuliano	2	(0)
- * Club domestic league appearances and goals as of 11 March 2026

Daniel Alejandro Rivillo Godoy (born 21 December 1996) is a Venezuelan footballer who plays as a defender for Deportivo Rayo Zuliano in the Venezuelan Primera División.

== Honors ==
=== Club ===
Zulia

- Copa Venezuela: 2016, 2018
