= Agustín Álvarez (footballer, born May 2001) =

Uruguayan footballer (born 2001)

Personal information
- Full name: Agustín Álvarez Martínez
- Date of birth: 19 May 2001 (age 25)
- Place of birth: San Bautista, Uruguay
- Height: 1.77 m (5 ft 10 in)
- Position: Forward

Team information
- Current team: Talleres (on loan from Sassuolo)
- Number: 9

Youth career
- 2012–2020: Peñarol

Senior career*
Years	Team	Apps	(Gls)
2020–2022	Peñarol	63	(24)
2022–	Sassuolo	22	(1)
2024	→ Sampdoria (loan)	14	(1)
2024–2025	→ Elche (loan)	37	(8)
2025–2026	→ Monza (loan)	24	(4)
2026–	→ Talleres (loan)	9	(4)

International career^{‡}
2021–	Uruguay	6	(1)
- * Club domestic league appearances and goals as of 17:38, 15 November 2026 (UTC) ‡ National team caps and goals as of 10 October 2025

Agustín Álvarez Martínez (born 19 May 2001) is a Uruguayan professional footballer who plays as a forward for Primera División club Talleres, on loan from Serie A club Sassuolo, and the Uruguay national team.

== Club career ==
=== Peñarol ===
A youth academy graduate of Peñarol, Álvarez made his professional debut on 13 September 2020 in goalless draw against Montevideo City Torque. He scored his first goal on 19 September 2020 in a 3–1 league win against Plaza Colonia.

=== Sassuolo ===
On 17 June 2022, Álvarez joined Serie A club Sassuolo on a five-year deal. In May 2023, he suffered an ACL tear and missed the first half of the 2023–24 season recovering.

==== Loan to Sampdoria ====
On 18 January 2024, Álvarez moved to Sampdoria in Serie B on loan until the end of the season.

==== Loan to Elche ====
On 17 August 2024, Álvarez moved to Spanish Segunda División side Elche also on loan.

==== Loan to Monza ====
On 27 August 2025, Álvarez joined Serie B club Monza on a one-year loan, with an option for purchase.

==== Loan to Talleres ====
On 14 August 2026, Álvarez joined Argentine Primera División club Talleres on a season-long loan with an option to buy 80% of his transfer rights.

== International career ==
Álvarez is a former Uruguay youth international. On 29 August 2021, he received his first call-up to senior team for FIFA World Cup qualifiers. He made his debut on 5 September 2021 by scoring a goal in a 4–2 win against Bolivia. On 21 October 2022, he was named in Uruguay's 55-man preliminary squad for the 2022 FIFA World Cup.

== Career statistics ==
=== Club ===
As of match played 10 May 2024

Appearances and goals by club, season and competition
Club	Season	League			National cup		Continental		Other		Total	
Club	Season	Division	Apps	Goals	Apps	Goals	Apps	Goals	Apps	Goals	Apps	Goals
Peñarol	2020	Uruguayan Primera División	24	10	—		5 (Note: Four appearances in Copa Libertadores and one appearance in Copa Sudamericana.)	0	—		29	10
Peñarol	2021	Uruguayan Primera División	25	13	—		14 (Note: Appearances in Copa Sudamericana.)	10	1 (Note: Appearance in Championship playoff.)	0	40	23
Peñarol	2022	Uruguayan Primera División	14	1	0	0	6 (Note: Appearances in Copa Libertadores.)	0	1 (Note: Appearance in Supercopa Uruguaya.)	0	21	1
Peñarol	Total		63	24	0	0	25	10	2	0	90	34
Sassuolo	2022–23	Serie A	22	1	1	0	—		—		23	1
Sassuolo	2023–24	Serie A	0	0	0	0	—		—		0	0
Sassuolo	Total		22	1	1	0	0	0	0	0	23	1
Sampdoria (loan)	2023–24	Serie B	14	1	—		—		0	0	14	1
Career total			99	26	1	0	25	10	2	0	127	36

=== International ===
As of match played 10 October 2025

Appearances and goals by national team and year
National team	Year	Apps	Goals
Uruguay	2021	4	1
Uruguay	2025	2	0
Uruguay	2026	0	0
Total		6	1

Scores and results list Uruguay's goal tally first, score column indicates score after each Álvarez goal.

List of international goals scored by Agustín Álvarez
No.	Date	Venue	Opponent	Score	Result	Competition
1	5 September 2021	Estadio Campeón del Siglo, Montevideo, Uruguay	Bolivia	3–0	4–2	2022 FIFA World Cup qualification

== Honours ==
Peñarol

- Uruguayan Primera División: 2021
- Supercopa Uruguaya: 2022

Individual

- Uruguayan Primera División Young Player of the Year: 2021
- Uruguayan Primera División Team of the Year: 2021
- Copa Sudamericana top scorer: 2021
